= Huracán–San Lorenzo derby =

Argentine football rivalry

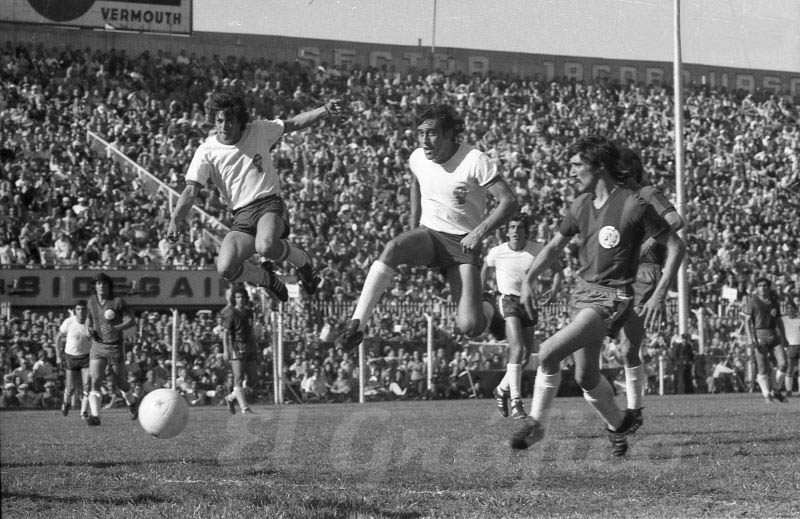
- Huracán vs. San Lorenzo in 1973

- Huracán San Lorenzo
- Other names: El clásico porteño El clásico de barrio más grande del mundo
- Sport: Football
- Location: Buenos Aires, Argentina
- First meeting: 24 October 1915; Primera División; San Lorenzo 3–1 Huracán
- Latest meeting: 8 February 2026; Primera División; Huracán 1–0 San Lorenzo
- Stadiums: Estadio Tomás Adolfo Ducó (Huracán); Estadio Pedro Bidegain (San Lorenzo)

Statistics
- Total meetings: 193 (Note: One match was awarded as lost to both teams in the 1997 Apertura tournament.)
- Most wins: San Lorenzo (87)
- Top scorer: José Sanfilippo (16 goals)
- All-time series: Huracán: 49; Draw: 56; San Lorenzo: 87
- Largest victory: Huracán: 5–1 (1944); San Lorenzo: 5–0 (1995)

The Huracán–San Lorenzo derby, also known as Porteño derby, is one of the traditional football matches in Argentina and the city of Buenos Aires. It is contested by Club Atlético Huracán and Club Atlético San Lorenzo de Almagro, and is one of the oldest and most followed in the country. Is also named the world's greatest neighborhood derby.

Today it transcends local boundaries, becoming a match followed both nationally and internationally, while maintaining the essence that gave it origin.

It is the third most important derby in the country in terms of total official titles (national and international) won by the two clubs, with a total of 35 titles (13 from Huracán and 22 from San Lorenzo), only behind the Superclásico and the Avellaneda derby. Additionally, both clubs rank in the top six positions in number of tickets sold throughout history (San Lorenzo third and Huracán sixth) and in most measurements of supporter numbers in the country.

San Lorenzo and Huracán are two of the oldest, most decorated and most supported clubs in Argentine football. Both are part of FIFA's gallery of classic clubs for Argentina, along with nine other teams.

== History ==
=== Origins and background ===
The traditional rivalry arose from the geographical proximity of both clubs, which during their founding years had their respective stadiums very close to each other. Huracán, after having previously passed through two other locations, positioned its field at Avenida Chiclana and Alagón in 1914, and remained there until 1924, just five blocks from where, between 1916 and 1981, El Gasómetro stood, the emblematic venue of San Lorenzo.

The rivalry, which already existed in the 1920s, is a healthy characteristic of the neighborhood environment, which enriches the cultural and sporting history of Parque Patricios, Boedo, and the rest of the City; both clubs being related to the Buenos Aires essence.

According to the neighborhood limits drawn in recent decades by the Buenos Aires city government, San Lorenzo was born in the current neighborhood of Boedo—although previously the area was considered part of Almagro, hence its name—a place where some of its social headquarters remain and where its historic stadium known as El Gasómetro was erected, where it played until 1979, when it disputed its last match there. After fourteen years, in 1993, it inaugurated its second and current stadium, the Pedro Bidegain—popularly known as Nuevo Gasómetro (New Gasometer)—in Bajo Flores.

Huracán, for its part, was born in the neighborhood of Nueva Pompeya and a few years later moved its social headquarters and positioned its stadium in what is now Parque Patricios.

To fuel the rivalry, both were born in the same year: San Lorenzo in April and Huracán in November 1908.

=== Early encounters ===
The first encounter between the two teams was a friendly match played on 1 April 1915, at Huracán's field at Chiclana and Alagón. It was won by the home team 3–1. The goals were scored by Eduardo Acevedo, Martín Salvarredi, and José Durand Laguna for the home side, and Luis Gianella for the visitors.

For its part, the first official encounter occurred on 24 October 1915, within the framework of the Primera División Championship, at the later-called Estadio Arquitecto Ricardo Etcheverri, of Club Ferro Carril Oeste, where San Lorenzo played as the home team. The match ended 3–1 in favor of the latter. The first goal was scored at 31 minutes by José Durand Laguna of Huracán, which suffered the expulsions of Luis Caldera and Agustín Palacios. From there, San Lorenzo's comeback occurred: at 51 minutes, Mariano Perazzo equalized, Francisco Xarau put them ahead, and then, again, Perazzo sealed the victory.

The first official victory for Huracán occurred three years later, in 1918, for the Copa de Honor, the first encounter in national cups. For the regular tournament, Huracán's first victory was on matchday 19 of the 1932 championship.

San Lorenzo, for its part, achieved the first victory in national cups in the 1932 Copa Beccar Varela.

The teams never faced each other in lower divisions or in international competitions; they always did so in the Primera División and national cups, within the local sphere.

=== Tributes ===
Roberto Guidotti, co-author of the official book for Huracán's centenary, said: It is the most Buenos Aires of all matches that Argentine football can offer. Because, beyond the fact that there are so many "Huracanes" and "San Lorenzos" in the country, the neighborhood reference is unavoidable. And also respect, always present beyond the despicable violence of hooligans. Journalist Eduardo Bejuk expressed in 2007: (...) this derby you won't find in tourist packages. It is of a multitudinous intimacy, anti-globalization bastion, Buenos Aires, convict, mysterious like a Homeric tango, streetwise like a Borgesian story, mine, yours, ours, eternal....

For his part, Fabián Casas—poet, narrator, journalist and visceral San Lorenzo supporter—in an exchange of letters with Hollywood star Viggo Mortensen, also a fanatical San Lorenzo supporter, through the club's official website, wrote: I confess something: when I saw how Huracán was going down to the B [Segunda División] because of the succulent thrashing that Independiente was applying to them, when I saw the scenes in which "Turco" Mohamed grabbed his head on the bench, my eyes filled with tears. I have great respect for the adversary. I wanted Cappa's Huracán to win the championship and never, under any point of view, for Globo to descend to the B. Why? It seems to me that in our country, there is no positive cult of the Adversary, something that even the Catholic Church has with the devil. Without the Adversary we are nothing. The very adversity is what empowers us.

== Statistics ==
=== Head-to-head summary ===
As of 8 February 2026 Only official matches are included.

Official head-to-head record
Competition	Matches	Results			Goals	
Competition	Matches	Huracán wins	Draws	San Lorenzo wins	Huracán goals	San Lorenzo goals
**National Leagues**
Primera División	177	46	47	83	217	312
**National Cups**
Copa de la Liga Profesional	4	0	4	0	2	2
Copa de la Superliga	2	0	2	0	0	0
Copa Centenario	2	0	1	1	0	2
Copa de la República	2	0	1	1	3	4
Copa de Competencia Británica	2	1	0	1	4	5
Copa Adrián Escobar	1	1	0	0	1	0
Copa Beccar Varela	2	0	1	1	3	4
Copa de Honor	1	1	0	0	2	0
Total	193	49	56	87	232	329

=== Summary by decades ===
Decades	Played	Won by Huracán	Draws	Won by San Lorenzo
1910–1919	5	1	2	2
1920–1929	2	0	0	2
1930–1939	22	7	2	13
1940–1949	25	7	7	11
1950–1959	20	4	4	12
1960–1969	22	3	6	13
1970–1979	29	11	7	11
1980–1989	12	3	5	4
1990–1999	20	4	7	8
2000–2009	11	3	4	4
2010–2019	14	3	5	6
2020–2029	11	3	7	1
Total	193	49	56	87

* All matches played in official competitions are included.

=== Primera División matches ===
Includes only matches in the Primera División since their first official game in 1915.

#	Season	Venue	Winner	Score	Goals (home team)	Goals (away team)
1	1915	Ferro (Note: San Lorenzo was the home team.)	**San Lorenzo**	3–1	Mariano Perazzo (2), Francisco Xarau	José Durand Laguna
2	1916	Huracán (Note: Huracán's old stadium, located at Av. Chiclana and Alagón)	**San Lorenzo**	1–0		Cayetano Urio
3	1917	El Gasómetro (Note: San Lorenzo's old stadium, located at Av. La Plata)	(Draw)	0–0		
4	1918	Huracán	(Draw)	0–0		
5	1927	Jorge Newbery (Note: Huracán's old stadium, located where the current one would later be built)	**San Lorenzo**	2–1	Cesáreo Onzari	Enrique Monti, Alfredo Carricaberry
6	1928	Jorge Newbery	**San Lorenzo**	2–1	Pablo Bartolucci	Juan Maglio, Alberto de la Peña
7	1930	El Gasómetro	**San Lorenzo**	3–1	José Blas Cortecci (2), Alfredo Carricaberry	César Concheiro
8	1931	El Gasómetro	**San Lorenzo**	3–0	Emilio Moyano (o.g.), José Blas Cortecci, Arturo Arrieta	
9	1931	Jorge Newbery	(Draw)	1–1	Cesáreo Onzari	Ernesto Closas
10	1932	El Gasómetro	**San Lorenzo**	2–1	José Fossa, Diego García	Alejandro de los Santos
11	1932	Jorge Newbery	**Huracán**	2–0	José Cordero, Herminio Masantonio	
12	1933	Jorge Newbery	**San Lorenzo**	2–1	Herminio Masantonio	Gabriel Magán, Diego García
13	1933	El Gasómetro	**Huracán**	4–1	Jacinto Villalba	Herminio Masantonio (2), Ricardo Gil, José Cordero
14	1934	Jorge Newbery	**San Lorenzo**	3–0		Arturo Arrieta, Ricardo Alarcón, Diego García
15	1934	El Gasómetro	**San Lorenzo**	5–1	Diego García, Petronilho de Brito, Alberto Chividini (2), Rubén Cavadini	Lamas
16	1934	Chacarita Jrs. (Note: Huracán was the home team.) (Note: Chacarita Juniors' old stadium in Villa Crespo)	**Huracán**	2–1	Domingo Fernández, Ricardo Gil	Petronilho de Brito
17	1935	Jorge Newbery	**Huracán**	2–1	Alberto Galateo (2)	Luis Rojas
18	1935	Ferro	**San Lorenzo**	3–0	Ismael Arrese, Rubén Cavadini, Genaro Cantelli	
19	1936	Jorge Newbery	**Huracán**	1–0	Adolfo Hermo	
20	1936	El Gasómetro	**San Lorenzo**	2–1	Arturo Naón (2)	Daniel Balsamo
21	1937	El Gasómetro	**San Lorenzo**	1–0	Rubén Cavadini	
22	1937	Jorge Newbery	**San Lorenzo**	1–0		Genaro Cantelli
23	1938	El Gasómetro	**San Lorenzo**	4–2	Agustín Cosso (3), Ricardo Alarcón	Carlos Belfiore, Herminio Masantonio
24	1938	Jorge Newbery	**San Lorenzo**	2–1	Daniel Balsamo	Ricardo Alarcón, Arturo Arrieta
25	1939	Jorge Newbery	**Huracán**	3–2	Emilio Baldonedo, Ramón Guerra, Herminio Masantonio	Rubén Cavadini, Ricardo Alarcón
26	1939	El Gasómetro	**Huracán**	5–2	Isidro Lángara (2)	Emilio Baldonedo (2), Rubén Perdomo, Herminio Masantonio, Plácido Rodríguez
27	1940	Jorge Newbery	**San Lorenzo**	4–2	Plácido Rodríguez (2)	Isidro Lángara (2), Waldemar de Brito, Antonio Nuñez
28	1940	El Gasómetro	(Draw)	3–3	Isidro Lángara (2), Juan Fattoni	Herminio Masantonio (3)
29	1941	El Gasómetro	**San Lorenzo**	5–2	Isidro Lángara (2), Rinaldo Martino, Carlos Marinelli (o.g.), Mateo Nicolau	Emilio Baldonedo (2)
30	1941	Jorge Newbery	**San Lorenzo**	3–0		Rinaldo Martino (2), Alfredo Borgnia
31	1942	El Gasómetro	**San Lorenzo**	2–1	Alfredo Borgnia, Rinaldo Martino	Alberto Crotti
32	1942	Jorge Newbery	**San Lorenzo**	3–1	Delfín Unzué	Carlos Rodríguez de Lara, Isidro Lángara, Ángel Zubieta
33	1943	Ferro	(Draw)	1–1	Emilio Baldonedo	Francisco de la Mata
34	1943	El Gasómetro	**San Lorenzo**	2–0	Tomás Etchepare, Rinaldo Martino	
35	1944	Ferro	**Huracán**	5–1	Juan Salvini (3), Emilio Baldonedo, Rubén Banchero	Francisco de la Mata
36	1944	El Gasómetro	(Draw)	2–2	Roberto Alarcón (2)	Atilio Mellone, Emilio Baldonedo
37	1945	El Gasómetro	**San Lorenzo**	4–2	Francisco Antuña, René Pontoni (2), Armando Farro	Llamil Simes, Norberto Méndez
38	1945	Monumental	**Huracán**	3–1	Delfín Unzué, Llamil Simes (2)	Juan Gosende
39	1946	El Gasómetro	**Huracán**	3–2	Armando Farro, Ángel Zubieta	Norberto Méndez, Alfredo Di Stéfano (2)
40	1946	Ferro	**San Lorenzo**	2–0		Armando Farro, Ángel Zubieta
41	1947	Vélez	(Draw)	1–1	Pedro Gallina	Ángel Zubieta
42	1947	El Gasómetro	(Draw)	3–3	Oscar Silva, René Pontoni, Rinaldo Martino	Llamil Simes (2), Norberto Méndez
43	1948	El Gasómetro	**Huracán**	1–0		Waldino Aguirre
44	1948	Tomás A. Ducó	**San Lorenzo**	2–1	Waldino Aguirre	Eduardo Reggi, Armando Farro
45	1949	Tomás A. Ducó	(Draw)	1–1	José Lanza	Gabriel Uñate
46	1949	El Gasómetro	**Huracán**	1–0		Modesto Salina
47	1950	Tomás A. Ducó	**San Lorenzo**	3–1	Héctor López	Mario Papa (2), Adolfo Seoane
48	1950	El Gasómetro	**Huracán**	3–2	Gabriel Uñate, Orlando Nappe (o.g.)	José Vigo (3)
49	1951	Tomás A. Ducó	(Draw)	4–4	Enrique Cerioni, Adolfo Trejo (2), Juan Filgueiras	Eduardo Reggi (2), Juan Benavídez, Ángel Zubieta
50	1951	El Gasómetro	(Draw)	2–2	José Giarrizzo, Juan Benavídez	Oscar Villafañe, Juan Romo
51	1952	El Gasómetro	**Huracán**	1–0		Antonio Martínez (o.g.)
52	1952	Tomás A. Ducó	**San Lorenzo**	3–2	Eduardo Ricagni, Valeriano López	Juan Benavídez (2), Héctor Cortiñas
53	1953	Tomás A. Ducó	**Huracán**	1–0	Antonio Giosa	
54	1953	El Gasómetro	**San Lorenzo**	3–1	José Florio, Doroteo Civico, Juan Benavidez	Manuel Pelegrina
55	1954	El Gasómetro	**San Lorenzo**	2–1	Ángel Berni (2)	Ricardo Infante
56	1954	La Bombonera	(Draw)	1–1	Elio Montaño	Rubén Pizarro
57	1955	El Gasómetro	(Draw)	0–0		
58	1955	La Bombonera	**San Lorenzo**	3–2	Ricardo Infante, Félix Respuela	José López, José Sanfilippo, Juan Benavidez
59	1956	Vélez	**San Lorenzo**	4–2	Horacio Onzari (2)	Ángel Berni, Juan Portaluppi, Raúl Martínez, Darío D'Alessandro
60	1956	El Gasómetro	**Huracán**	1–0		Horacio Onzari
61	1957	Tomás A. Ducó	**San Lorenzo**	5–3	R. Bellomo (2), N. Méndez	José Herrera (2), Norberto Boggio (2), José Sanfilippo
62	1957	El Gasómetro	**San Lorenzo**	1–0	Norberto Boggio	
63	1958	El Gasómetro	**San Lorenzo**	3–1	José Sanfilippo, Ángel Cigna, Norberto Boggio	Orlando Peloso
64	1958	Ferro	**San Lorenzo**	4–2	Oscar Rossi, Norberto Méndez	José Sanfilippo (2), José Herrera, Miguel Ruíz
65	1959	Tomás A. Ducó	**San Lorenzo**	4–1	Humberto Cancino (o.g.)	Norberto Boggio, José Sanfilippo , Miguel Ruíz
66	1959	El Gasómetro	**San Lorenzo**	6–3	Norberto Boggio (3), José Sanfilippo (3)	Jorge Diz (2), Juan Carlos Soria
67	1960	El Gasómetro	**San Lorenzo**	2–0	José Sanfilippo, Luis Leeb	
68	1960	Tomás A. Ducó	**San Lorenzo**	4–2	Carlos Arredondo, Oscar Villano	José Sanfilippo (3), Oscar Rossi
69	1961	El Gasómetro	**San Lorenzo**	5–2	José Sanfilippo (2), Héctor Facundo (2), Miguel Ruíz	Jorge Diz, Norberto Menéndez
70	1961	Tomás A. Ducó	(Draw)	0–0		
71	1962	Tomás A. Ducó	**Huracán**	1–0	Ernesto Juárez	
72	1962	El Gasómetro	(Draw)	2–2	Oscar Rossi (2)	Adalberto Marchesi (2)
73	1963	El Gasómetro	**San Lorenzo**	3–1	Oscar Rossi (2), Eladio Zárate	Agapito Brítez Sánchez
74	1963	Tomás A. Ducó	(Draw)	0–0		
75	1964	Tomás A. Ducó	(Draw)	0–0		
76	1964	El Gasómetro	**San Lorenzo**	3–0	Héctor Veira, Juan Carlos Carotti, Roberto Telch	
77	1965	Tomás A. Ducó	**San Lorenzo**	1–0		Ignacio Santamaría
78	1965	El Gasómetro	**San Lorenzo**	4–2	Rodolfo Fischer (2), Narciso Doval, Victorio Casa	Alberto Cabaleiro, "Tito" Gómez
79	1966	Tomás A. Ducó	**San Lorenzo**	2–1	Alfredo Obberti	Juan Facio, Héctor Veira
80	1966	El Gasómetro	**San Lorenzo**	4–1	Héctor Veira (2), Alberto Rendo, Rodolfo Fischer	Eladio Zárate
81	1967	Tomás A. Ducó	**San Lorenzo**	2–0		Rodolfo Fischer, Narciso Doval
82	1967	El Gasómetro	**San Lorenzo**	2–1	Héctor Veira, Rodolfo Fischer	Alejo Medina
83	1968	Tomás A. Ducó	(Draw)	0–0		
84	1968	El Gasómetro	(Draw)	2–2	Carlos Veglio, Pedro Alexis González	Hugo Tedesco, Jorge Olmedo
85	1968	El Gasómetro	**San Lorenzo**	3–1	Oscar Calics, Roberto Telch, Carlos Veglio	Miguel Ángel Loayza
86	1969	La Bombonera	**Huracán**	3–1	Miguel Ángel Brindisi, Rodolfo Vilanova	Roberto Telch
87	1969	La Bombonera	**Huracán**	3–1	Miguel Ángel Brindisi, Hugo Tedesco, Luis Alberto Giribet	Miguel Ángel Tojo
88	1969	El Gasómetro	**San Lorenzo**	2–1	Roberto Telch, Alberto Rendo	Luis Alberto Giribet
89	1970	Tomás A. Ducó	**Huracán**	3–2	Roque Avallay, Alberto Rendo, Hugo Tedesco	Luciano Figueroa, Rodolfo Fischer
90	1971	La Bombonera	**San Lorenzo**	5–1	Luis Alberto Giribert	Rodolfo Fischer, Carlos Veglio, Rubén Ayala (2), Pedro Alexis González
91	1971	El Gasómetro	**San Lorenzo**	2–0	Antonio García Ameijenda, Pedro Alexis González	
92	1971	Atlanta	**San Lorenzo**	3–0		Daniel Buglione (o.g.), Antonio García Ameijenda, Héctor Scotta
93	1972	El Gasómetro	(Draw)	2–2	Rubén Ayala (2)	Miguel Ángel Brindisi, Carlos Babington
94	1972	Tomás A. Ducó	**Huracán**	3–0	Miguel Ángel Brindisi, Roque Avallay (2)	
95	1972	La Bombonera	**San Lorenzo**	3–0		Ramón Heredia (2), Enrique Chazarreta
96	1973	Tomás A. Ducó	(Draw)	2–2	Roque Avallay, Carlos Babington	Héctor Scotta, Rubén Ayala
97	1973	Vélez	**San Lorenzo**	1–0	Sergio Villar	
98	1973	La Bombonera	(Draw)	2–2	Roberto Telch, Héctor Scotta	Roque Avallay, Carlos Babington
99	1974	Tomás A. Ducó	**San Lorenzo**	2–0		Héctor Scotta, Juan Carlos Piris
100	1974	El Gasómetro	**Huracán**	2–0		Carlos Babington, Carlos Leone
101	1974	Tomás A. Ducó	**Huracán**	2–0	Carlos Babington, Miguel Ángel Brindisi	
102	1974	El Gasómetro	(Draw)	2–2	Alberto Beltrán, Enrique Chazarreta	Carlos Leone, Carlos Babington
103	1975	El Gasómetro	**San Lorenzo**	1–0	Héctor Scotta	
104	1975	Tomás A. Ducó	(Draw)	1–1	José Sanabria	Héctor Scotta
105	1975	Tomás A. Ducó	**San Lorenzo**	1–0		Claudio Premici
106	1975	El Gasómetro	(Draw)	2–2	Mario Mendoza, Oscar Ortiz	Omar Larrosa, Miguel Ángel Brindisi
107	1976	Tomás A. Ducó	**Huracán**	3–1	Omar Larrosa, Osvaldo Ardiles, Miguel Ángel Candedo	Héctor Scotta
108	1976	El Gasómetro	**Huracán**	3–1	Mario Alberto Rizzi	Augusto Sánchez, Omar Larrosa, René Houseman
109	1976	La Bombonera	**Huracán**	4–2	Héctor Scotta, Juan Manuel Sanz	Miguel Ángel Brindisi (2), René Houseman, Carlos Leone
110	1976	El Gasómetro	**Huracán**	2–1	Jorge Olguin	Carlos Leone, René Houseman
111	1976	Tomás A. Ducó	**Huracán**	2–1	Luis Cabrera, Daniel Cano	Eduardo Daniel Uzin
112	1977	El Gasómetro	(Draw)	2–2	Daniel Olivares (2)	Luis Cabrera, Oscar Avilés
113	1977	Tomás A. Ducó	**Huracán**	1–0	Jorge Armando Sanabria	
114	1978	Tomás A. Ducó	**San Lorenzo**	3–2	Rodolfo Vilanova, Rubén Romano	Juan Raúl Meglio (2), Rircardo Collavini
115	1978	El Gasómetro	**San Lorenzo**	2–1	Miguel Ángel Torres, Horacio Simaldone	René Houseman
116	1979	El Gasómetro	**Huracán**	2–1	Víctor Marchetti	Roque Avallay, Jorge Armando Sanabria
117	1979	Tomás A. Ducó	**San Lorenzo**	3–1	Carlos Babington	Mario Rizzi, Miguel Ángel Torres
118	1980	Vélez	**San Lorenzo**	2–1	Oscar Rinaldi, Mario Rizzi	Miguel Ángel Brindisi
119	1980	Tomás A. Ducó	**Huracán**	1–0	Carlos Babington	
120	1980	Tomás A. Ducó	**Huracán**	2–1	Claudio Morandini	René Houseman, Jorge Armando Sanabria
121	1980	Tomás A. Ducó	**San Lorenzo**	3–2	Jorge Gutiérrez, Roque Avallay	Jaime Corro (2), Mario Rizzi
122	1981	Tomás A. Ducó	**San Lorenzo**	3–1	Omar Larrosa (2), Ernesto Juárez (e/c)	Claudio Marangoni
123	1981	La Bombonera	**Huracán**	1–0		Carlos Centurión
124	1983	Tomás A. Ducó	(Draw)	2–2	Claudio Morresi, Osvaldo Biain (e/c)	Osvaldo Biain, José Raúl Iglesias
125	1983	Vélez	**San Lorenzo**	2–1	Walter Perazzo, Mario Husillos	Ángel Converti
126	1984	Tomás A. Ducó	(Draw)	2–2	José Luis Lanao, Christian Angeletti	José Raúl Iglesias, Juan Crespín
127	1984	San Lorenzo	(Draw)	1–1	Pedro Coudannes	Christian Angeletti
128	1985–86	La Bombonera	(Draw)	0–0		
129	1985–86	Tomás A. Ducó	(Draw)	1–1	José Raúl Iglesias	Blas Giunta
130	1990–91	Tomás A. Ducó	(Draw)	0–0		
131	1990–91	Ferro	**Huracán**	1–0		Hector Herrero
132	1991	Tomás A. Ducó	(Draw)	2–2	Sergio Saturno, Hugo Morales	Flavio Zandoná, Alberto Acosta
133	1992	Vélez	(Draw)	2–2	Mario Ballarino, Jorge Rinaldi	Walter Pelletti (2)
134	1992	Tomás A. Ducó	**Huracán**	1–0	Jorge Cruz-Cruz	
135	1993	Vélez	**San Lorenzo**	1–0		Sergio Céliz
136	1993	Vélez	**San Lorenzo**	1–0		Marcelo Maydana
137	1994	Tomás A. Ducó	**Huracán**	2–1	Rodolfo Flores, Pedro Barrios	Carlos Netto
138	1994	Tomás A. Ducó	**San Lorenzo**	2–1	Rodolfo Flores	Roberto Monserrat, Fernando Galetto
139	1995	Nuevo Gasómetro	**San Lorenzo**	3–0	Claudio Biaggio (2), Hugo Corbalán (o/g)	
140	1995	Nuevo Gasómetro	**San Lorenzo**	5–0	Claudio Biaggio, Esteban González (2), Paulo Silas, Roberto Monserrat	
141	1996	Tomás A. Ducó	(Draw)	1–1	Hugo Guerra	Luis Carranza
142	1996	Tomás A. Ducó	(Draw)	1–1	Rodolfo Flores	Paulo Silas
143	1997	Nuevo Gasómetro	**San Lorenzo**	5–1	Néstor Gorosito, Paulo Silas, Sebastián Abreu, Luis Fernando, Claudio Rivadero	Antonio Barijho
144	1997	Nuevo Gasómetro	PP-PP			
145	1998	Vélez	**Huracán**	2–1	Antonio Barijho, Daniel Montenegro	Alberto Acosta
146	1998	Vélez	**San Lorenzo**	2–0	Federico Lussenhoff, Néstor Gorosito	
147	1999	Vélez	(Draw)	1–1	Marcos Barlatay	Bernardo Romeo
148	2000	Tomás A. Ducó	**Huracán**	2–1	Sebastián Morquio, Iván Gabrich	Bernardo Romeo
149	2001	Nuevo Gasómetro	(Draw)	1–1	Raúl Estévez	Sergio Berti
150	2001	Nuevo Gasómetro	**Huracán**	1–0		Tito Villa
151	2002	Tomás A. Ducó	(Draw)	1–1	Tito Villa	Leo Rodríguez
152	2002	Tomás A. Ducó	**San Lorenzo**	4–0		Rodrigo Astudillo (3), Pablo Michelini
153	2003	Nuevo Gasómetro	**San Lorenzo**	4–0	José Chatruc, Alberto Acosta (2), Damián Luna	
154	2007	Nuevo Gasómetro	(Draw)	1–1	Jonathan Bottinelli	Paolo Goltz
155	2008	Diego A. Maradona	(Draw)	0–0		
156	2008	La Bombonera	**San Lorenzo**	4–1	Paolo Goltz	Aureliano Torres, Cristian Chávez, Andrés Silvera (2)
157	2009	La Bombonera	**Huracán**	1–0		Paolo Goltz
158	2009	Tomás A. Ducó	**San Lorenzo**	2–0		Renato Civelli, Juan Manuel Torres
159	2010	Nuevo Gasómetro	**San Lorenzo**	3–0	Alejandro Gómez, Fabián Bordagaray, Cristian Leiva	
160	2010	Tomás A. Ducó	**Huracán**	3–0	Carlos Quintana, Facundo Quiroga, Diego Rodríguez	
161	2011	Nuevo Gasómetro	**San Lorenzo**	3–0	Néstor Ortigoza, Juan Manuel Salgueiro, Pablo Velázquez	
162	2015	Nuevo Gasómetro	**San Lorenzo**	3–1	Leandro Romagnoli, Matías Caruzzo, Mauro Matos	Patricio Toranzo
163	2015	Tomás A. Ducó	**Huracán**	1–0	Patricio Toranzo	
164	2016	Tomás A. Ducó	(Draw)	1–1	Ramón Ábila	Fernando Belluschi
165	2016	Nuevo Gasómetro	**San Lorenzo**	1–0	Nicolás Blandi	
166	2016–17	Nuevo Gasómetro	**San Lorenzo**	2–0	Martín Cauteruccio, Sebastián Blanco	
167	2016–17	Tomás A. Ducó	**San Lorenzo**	1–0		Marcos Angeleri
168	2017–18	Tomás A. Ducó	(Draw)	1–1	Andrés Chávez	Nicolás Reniero
169	2018–19	Nuevo Gasómetro	(Draw)	0–0		
170	2019–20	Tomás A. Ducó	**Huracán**	2–0	Lucas Barrios, Fernando Coniglio	
171	2021	Tomás A. Ducó	**Huracán**	2–1	Franco Cristaldo, Jhonatan Candia	Franco Di Santo
172	2022	Nuevo Gasómetro	**San Lorenzo**	1–0	Ezequiel Cerutti	
173	2023	Tomás A. Ducó	(Draw)	1–1	Matías Cóccaro	Jalil Elías
174	2024	Nuevo Gasómetro	(Draw)	1–1	Gastón Campi	Williams Alarcón
175	2025	Tomás A. Ducó	**Huracán**	2–0	Fabio Pereyra, Rodrigo Cabral	
176	2025	Nuevo Gasómetro	(Draw)	0–0		
177	2026	Tomás A. Ducó	**Huracán**	1–0	Jordy Caicedo	

==== Head-to-head statistics in Primera División ====
**San Lorenzo wins**	**83**
**Draws**	**47**
**Huracán wins**	**46**
**Matches played**	**177**

=== National cups matches ===
The list below includes matches in national cup competitions. The club name in bold indicates a win.

#	Cup	Year	Venue	Winner	Score	Goals (H)	Goals (A)
1	Copa de Honor	1918	El Gasómetro	**Huracán**	2–0		Miguel Ginevra, José Durand Laguna
2	Copa Beccar Varela	1932	El Gasómetro	**San Lorenzo**	2–1	Francisco Volpi (2)	Herminio Masantonio
3	Copa Beccar Varela	1933	Jorge Newbery	(Draw)	2–2	Herminio Masantonio (2)	Tomás Loyarte, Jacinto Villalba
4	Copa Adrián Escobar	1942	Monumental	**Huracán**	1–0		Ramón Guerra
5	Copa de la República	1943	Chacarita	(Draw)	2–2	Juan Salvini (2)	Tomás Etchepare, Héctor Tablada
6	Copa de la República	1943	Chacarita	**San Lorenzo**	2–1	Rinaldo Martino (2)	Ramón Guerra
7	Copa de Competencia Británica	1944	Atlanta	**Huracán**	4–3	Jorge Enrico, Juan Carlos Heredia, Roberto Alarcón	Plácido Rodríguez, Llamil Simes, Norberto Méndez, Adolfo Crotti
8	Copa de Competencia Británica	1946	Ferro	**San Lorenzo**	2–0		Rinaldo Martino (2)
9	Copa Centenario	1993	Tomás A. Ducó	**San Lorenzo**	2–0		Ángel Bernuncio (2)
10	Copa Centenario	1993	Monumental	(Draw)	0–0		
11	Copa de la Superliga	2019	Nuevo Gasómetro	(Draw)	0–0		
12	Copa de la Superliga	2019	Tomás A. Ducó	(Draw)	0–0 (4–3 p.)		
13	Copa de la Liga Profesional	2021	Nuevo Gasómetro	(Draw)	1–1	Franco Di Santo	Franco Cristaldo
14	Copa de la Liga Profesional	2022	Nuevo Gasómetro	(Draw)	0–0		
15	Copa de la Liga Profesional	2023	Nuevo Gasómetro	(Draw)	1–1	Adam Bareiro	Ignacio Pussetto
16	Copa de la Liga Profesional	2024	Tomás A. Ducó	(Draw)	0–0		

==== Head-to-head statistics in national cups ====
**San Lorenzo wins**	**4**
**Draws**	**9**
**Huracán wins**	**3**
**Matches played**	**16**

== Records ==
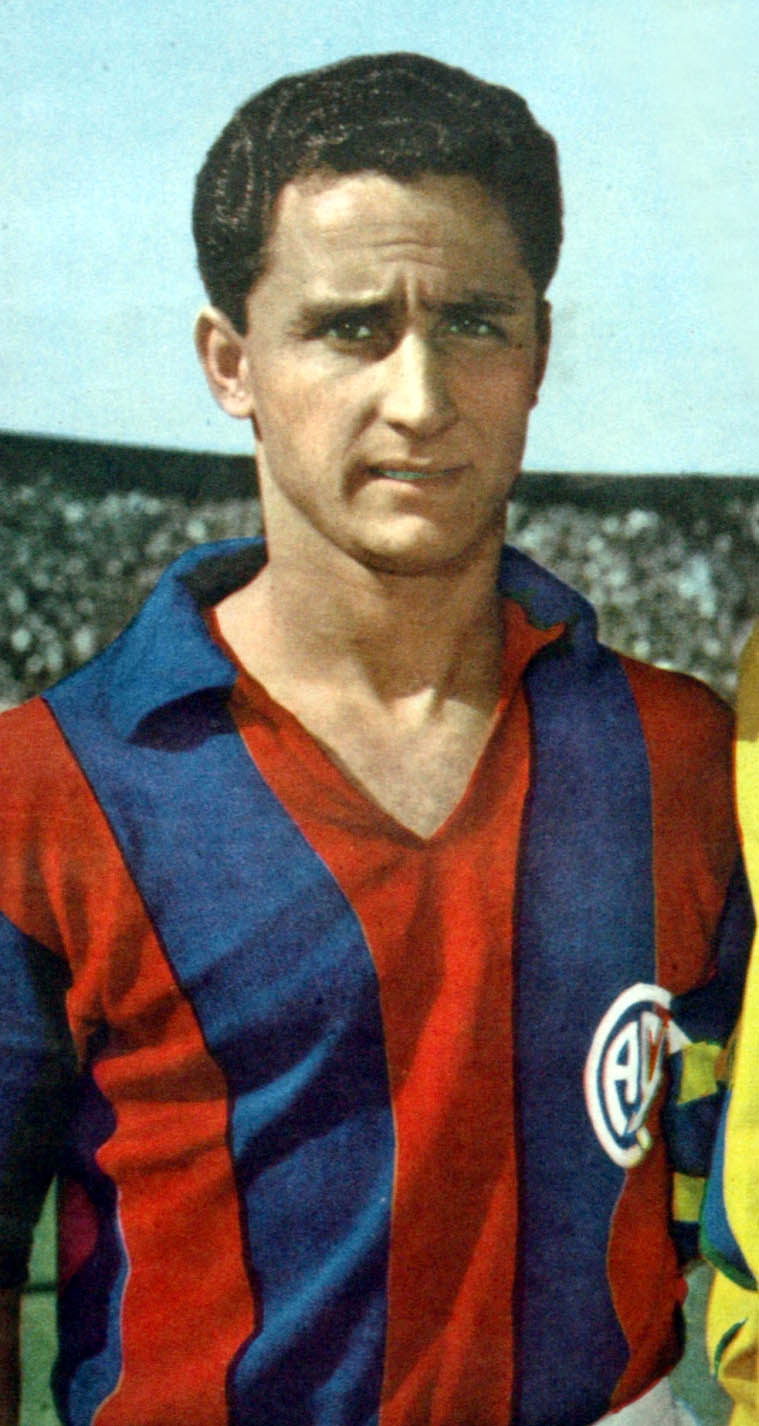
José Sanfilippo, with 16 goals, is the all-time top scorer of the derby.

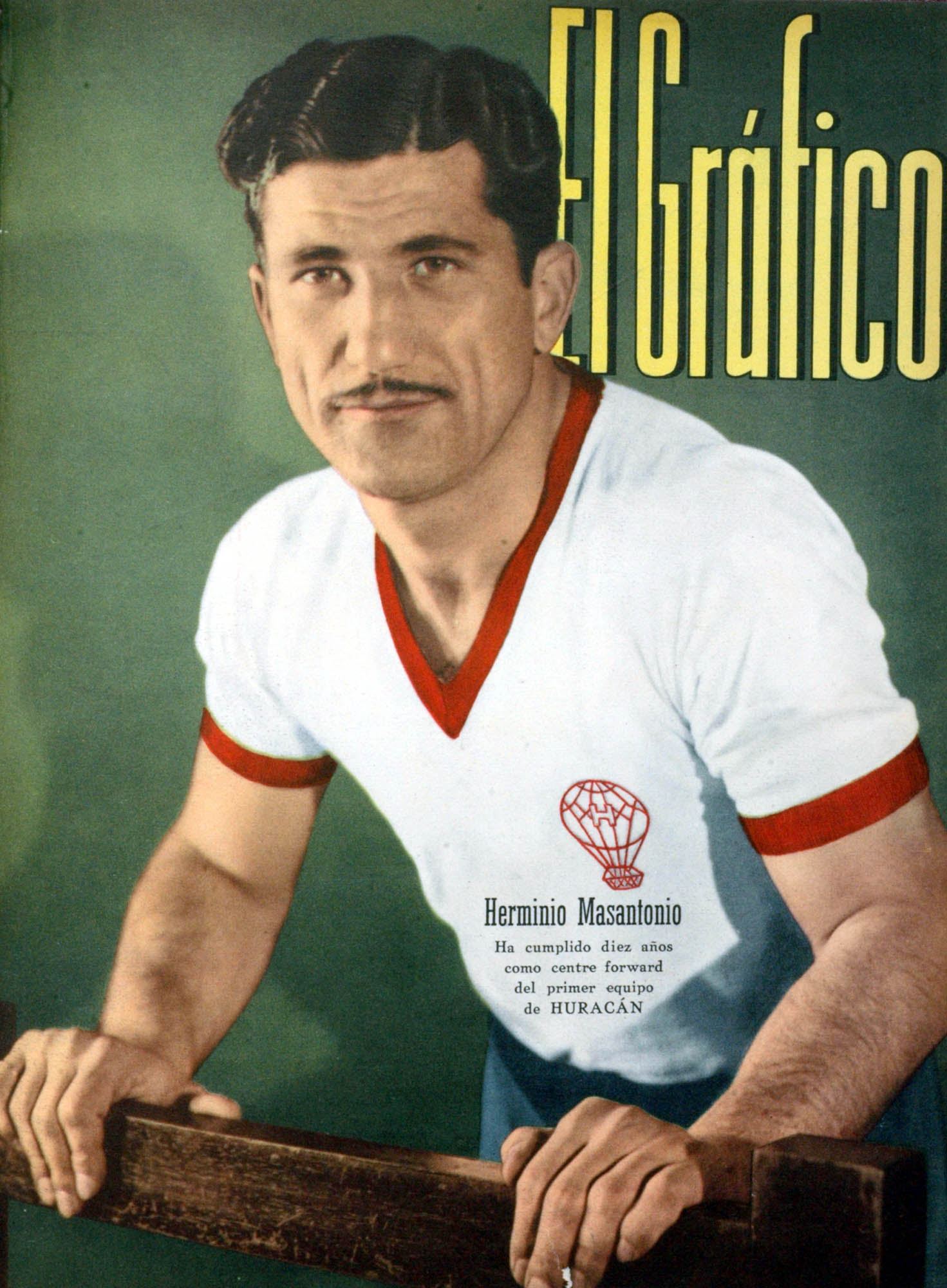
Herminio Masantonio, with 10 goals, is Huracán's all-time top scorer in the derby.

- The maximum number of years unbeaten in the Primera División Championship belongs to San Lorenzo, with 17, between 1915 and 1932. There were 7 victories and 3 draws.
- The maximum number of consecutive victories belongs to San Lorenzo, with 9, between the second round of the 1957 championship and the first round of 1961, inclusive.
- The maximum number of unbeaten matches belongs to San Lorenzo, with 13, between 1957 and 1968. There were 11 victories and 2 draws.
- The most consecutive home victories belong to San Lorenzo, with 5 victories on 4 occasions: 1934 to 1938, 1957 to 1961, 1963 to 1967, and 1993 to 1997.
- The most consecutive away victories again belong to San Lorenzo, with 6 consecutive victories between 1955 and 1960.
- The most victories in a single year belong to Huracán, with 5 consecutive victories during 1976, something unique in the history of Argentine football derbies.
- The match with the most goals was in the second round of the 1959 Primera División Championship, when San Lorenzo defeated Huracán 6–3.
- The all-time top scorer is José Sanfilippo of San Lorenzo, with 16 goals.
- The biggest home victory belongs to San Lorenzo de Almagro, which won 5–0 in the 1995 Torneo Apertura. For its part, Huracán won 5–1 in 1944.
- The biggest away victory belongs to San Lorenzo de Almagro. They won 4–0 in the 2002 Torneo Apertura, at the Palacio Tomás Adolfo Ducó.

=== Top scorers ===
Player	Team	Goals
José Sanfilippo	San Lorenzo	16
Herminio Masantonio	Huracán	10
Miguel Ángel Brindisi	Huracán	9
Isidro Lángara	San Lorenzo	9
Carlos Babington	Huracán	8
Emilio Baldonedo	Huracán	8
Norberto Boggio	San Lorenzo	8
Rodolfo Fischer	San Lorenzo	8

== Club comparison ==
Comparative overview
Category	Huracán	San Lorenzo
Date of foundation	1 November 1908	1 April 1908
Nickname	El Globo / Quemeros	El Ciclón / Cuervos
Stadium	Estadio Tomás Adolfo Ducó	Estadio Pedro Bidegain
Capacity	48,314	47,964
Members	51,302	89,717
Current category	Primera División	Primera División
All-time ranking (Primera División)	8th position (3,653 points)	3rd position (4,994 points)
Primera División titles	5	15
National Cups	8	2
International titles	0	5
Second Division titles	3 (1913, 1989–90, 1999–00)	1 (1982)
Third Division titles	0	1 (1914)
International tournaments played	12	38

== Honours ==
With 35 combined official titles, the Huracán–San Lorenzo derby is the third most decorated rivalry in Argentine football.

Official titles comparison
Competition	Huracán	San Lorenzo
National Leagues
Primera División	5	15
National Cups
Copa Argentina	1	0
Supercopa Argentina	1	1
Copa Adrián Escobar	2	0
Copa Dr. Carlos Ibarguren	2	0
Copa de Competencia Británica	1	0
Copa de la República	0	1
Copa Estímulo	1	0
International Titles
Copa Libertadores	0	1
Copa Sudamericana	0	1
Copa Mercosur	0	1
Copa Aldao (AFA/AUF)	0	1
Copa Campeonato del Río de la Plata (AFA/AUF)	0	1
Total	13	22

=== Titles by decade ===
Decades	Huracán	San Lorenzo
1910–1919	1	0
1920–1929	6	5
1930–1939	0	2
1940–1949	3	2
1950–1959	0	1
1960–1969	0	1
1970–1979	1	3
1980–1989	0	0
1990–1999	0	1
2000–2009	0	4
2010–2019	2	3
2020–2029	0	0
Total	13	22

* Official titles are included, both local and international, in the top category.

== Players who have played for both teams ==
List of players who have defended the shirts of both San Lorenzo and Huracán.

- Jonás Acevedo
- Juan Santos Argañaraz
- Carlos Auzqui
- Héctor Blanco
- Carlos Bustos
- Carlos Buttice
- Fabián Carrizo
- José Cortecci
- Narciso Doval
- Gustavo Echaniz
- Héctor Facundo
- Héctor Fértoli
- Juan Ramón Fleita
- Antonio García Ameijenda
- Carlos Gay
- Ariel Graña
- Gabriel Gudiño
- Ibrahim Hallar
- Diego Herner
- Santiago Hirsig
- José Raúl "Toti" Iglesias
- Juan José Irigoyen
- Omar Larrosa
- Cristian Leiva
- Héctor López
- Claudio Marangoni
- Pablo Migliore
- Rubén Milone
- Fernando Moner
- Luis Monti
- Carlos Alberto Moreno
- Lucas Nanía
- Oscar Ortiz
- Óscar Romero
- Esteban Pogany
- Juan Portaluppi
- Ángel Puertas
- Ricardo Quiñones
- Alberto Rendo
- Osvaldo Rinaldi
- Juan Rizzi
- Rubén Omar Romano
- Oscar Rossi
- Eduardo Isidro Sánchez
- José San Román
- Oscar Silva
- Andrés Silvera
- Rubén "Chapa" Suñé
- Héctor Veira
- Eladio Zárate

== Anthems ==
The anthems of both institutions were composed in the 1940s, with music by Alfredo Zappettini and lyrics by Agustín Bernárdez.

== Violence ==
The antagonism between both institutions goes beyond sporting competition. Unfortunately, acts of violence became strong in the 1990s, when barras bravas (organized supporter groups) confronted each other many times. In these episodes, the death of Ulises Fernández, a Huracán supporter, occurred in a shooting outside the Nuevo Gasómetro.

Later, in 2002, hooligans from Huracán secretly entered San Lorenzo's Sports City during the night and produced the theft of a giant flag (known in Argentina as a telón), which they later burned.

More recently, in 2008, during the celebration of Huracán's centenary, a group from this club's barra brava diverted the bus in which they were traveling to go confront San Lorenzo's barra brava. This confrontation again ended with the death of a member of a sector of Huracán's barra brava, surnamed Silvera, known as Cafú. All these episodes, added to other confrontations of lesser relevance, have rarefied the atmosphere of the derby, even leading to it being played without flags or banners, in neutral stadiums, limiting the number of spectators and with a large police operation mounted at each event.

Despite this, there are campaigns that seek to reverse the situation, promoting harmony and understanding, beyond sporting rivalry.

== See also ==
- Club Atlético San Lorenzo de Almagro
- Club Atlético Huracán

== Bibliography ==
- Poggi, Carlos; Glucksmann, Roberto (March 2008). "8". 100 años de pasión azulgrana (in Spanish) (18 ed.). Buenos Aires, Argentina: El Gráfico. p. 97. ISBN 978-987-1298-11-2. "El de San Lorenzo y Huracán tal vez sea el clásico de barrio de mayor linaje no solo en la Argentina sino en buena parte del planeta Fútbol."
- Redacción La Nación (January 1995). "52". Historia del Fútbol Argentino (in Spanish). 3 volumes. Issues released with the newspaper La Nación in 1995. Buenos Aires: Diario La Nación. p. 830. "San Lorenzo ganaba 5-0 en el Apertura 1995."
