= Corvalán =

Corvalán is a surname. Notable people with the surname include:

- Arturo Corvalán (born 1978), Chilean road racing cyclist
- Carmen Silva-Corvalan, American linguist
- Claudio Corvalán (born 1989), Argentine footballer
- Cristóbal Saavedra Corvalán (born 1990), Chilean tennis player
- Diego Corvalan (born 2002), Swiss-Argentine footballer
- Juan Rege Corvalán (1787–1830), Argentine politician and military man
- Luis Corvalán (1916–2010), Chilean politician
- Silvia Corvalán (born 1973), Argentine field hockey player
- Virginia Corvalán (1900-?), Paraguayan lawyer and feminist

== See also ==
- Corbalán (surname)
