= Corbalán (surname) =

Corbalán is a surname. Notable people with the surname include:

- Gonzalo Corbalán (born 2002), Argentine basketball player
- Hugo Corbalán (born 1970), Argentine retired footballer
- Juan Carlos Corbalan (born 1997), Argentine-born footballer
- Joaquín Corbalán (1870–1933), Argentine physician and politician
- Juan Pablo Corbalán (born 1998), Argentine basketball player
- Lautaro Jiménez Corbalán (born 1962), Argentine veteran of war
- Macky Corbalán (1963–2014), Argentine poet and journalist
- Pascual Corbalán (born 1937), Argentine retired football player

== See also ==
- Corvalán, a similar surname
