= Orlando Gill =

Paraguayan goalkeeper (born 2000)

- Orlando Gill with Paraguay in 2026

Personal information
- Full name: Orlando Daniel Gill Noldin
- Date of birth: 11 June 2000 (age 26)
- Place of birth: San Lorenzo, Paraguay
- Height: 1.98 m (6 ft 6 in) (Note: This is Gill's height as claimed by the Paraguayan Football Association, BBC Sport, and the Associated Press. FIFA has written that Gill is 1.90 meters tall (6ft 3in) on their Squad Lists (see FIFA 2026, p. 36) while other Argentine sources have stated that he is about 1.95 or 1.96 meters tall (6ft 4in or 6ft 5in) (see Tossi 2025, Infobae 2025, Arena 2025))
- Position: Goalkeeper

Team information
- Current team: Lille
- Number: 12

Youth career
- ?–2012: Sportivo Tayazuapé
- 2012–2013: Club 13 de Junio
- 2013–2019: CS San Lorenzo

Senior career*
Years	Team	Apps	(Gls)
2019–2023	CS San Lorenzo	2	(0)
2024	→ San Lorenzo II (loan)	12	(0)
2024–2026	San Lorenzo	54	(0)
2026–	Lille	1	(0)

International career^{‡}
2019	Paraguay U20	1	(0)
2025–	Paraguay	13	(0)
- * Club domestic league appearances and goals as of 17 October 2026 (UTC) ‡ National team caps and goals as of 15 November 2026

Orlando Daniel Gill Noldin (born 11 June 2000; Spanish pronunciation: [oɾˈlando daˈnjel ˈxiʝ ˈnoldin]) is a Paraguayan professional association football player who plays as a goalkeeper for Ligue 1 club Lille and the Paraguay national team.

Born in San Lorenzo, Paraguay, Gill began his youth career as a midfielder with local Club 13 de Junio, having also played as a forward at an earlier age. At age thirteen, he transitioned to playing as a goalkeeper and was subsequently scouted by then third-division side CS San Lorenzo. Gill began his senior career with CS San Lorenzo, making his professional debut in 2020 before moving to Argentine side San Lorenzo de Almagro on loan in 2024. After earning a spot in the first team, he set a club record for clean sheets at the start of a season. In August 2026, following standout domestic performances and an impressive run with Paraguay at the 2026 FIFA World Cup, where he helped to eliminate the Germany national team in the Round of 32, Gill signed a five-year contract with French club Lille.

== Club career ==
=== Youth career ===
Orlando Daniel Gill Noldin was born in the Paraguayan city of San Lorenzo on 11 June 2000 as the son of Orlando Gill Miers and Delcy Carolina Noldin and one of the brothers of Eduardo and Yanina Magalí. The young Paraguayan started youth career as a midfielder and forward with local club Sportivo Tayazuapé. At age twelve, he became part of local youth team Club 13 de Junio, where he transitioned to the goalkeeper position before being scouted the following year by the then third-division side CS San Lorenzo. Around this age, Gill was encouraged to practice basketball due to his tall height and large physique; nevertheless, he wanted to continue playing football and ignored the idea.

=== Senior career ===
==== Club Sportivo San Lorenzo ====
Following his year at CS San Lorenzo's youth system, the club opted to sign a ninteen year-old Gill in 2019. Here he made his professional debut as a footballer in a 3–0 defeat against Club Libertad during the Torneo Apertura of the 2020 APF División de Honor, Paraguay's top tier. He played in the starting eleven again in the following versus Cerro Porteño before making a four year long absence and being loaned out to San Lorenzo de Almagro in 2024.

==== San Lorenzo de Almagro ====
Gill arrived at San Lorenzo to form part of its reserve team. In his first season, San Lorenzo finished as the reserve league's runners-up. Some sport journalists have come to argue that due his performances during the campaign, Gill began to be considered as a candidate for the first-team. Following the reserve league team's campaign, San Lorenzo's last game in the 2024 AFA Liga Profesional de Fútbol, a 1–0 home loss against CA Tigre, cemented the goalkeeper's first appearance in the club's first team.

Gill playing versus Racing Club with San Lorenzo de Almagro in 2025

In the following campaign's pre-season, starting goalkeeper Facundo Altamirano suffered an injury in a match versus Uruguay's Club Nacional de Football. This fact, along with the lack of goalkeepers, led Gill to start in the following three matches, keeping a clean sheet in all three. San Lorenzo opted to acquire 50 percent of Gill's contract for $500,000 following his performances in the pre-season, as he was playing without one, and sign him until December 2027. The rest was paid to his former team, CS San Lorenzo.

Gill made great statistical displays during the first matches of San Lorenzo's campaign in the 2025 AFA Liga Profesional de Fútbol, beating the club record of most consecutive clean sheets since the start of the season. Across the fifteen matches of the group stage, he recorded nine clean sheets and conceded six goals, helping San Lorenzo finish fourth in Group B with 27 points and qualify for the play-offs of the Torneo Apertura. (Note: The Argentine Football Association expanded the league to a 30-team format that featured two 15-team groups with the top eight qualifying for the play-offs to determine the league champion.) Following qualification, San Lorenzo beat Tigre in the round of 16 to play against AA Argentinos Juniors in the Quarter-finals. In the match against El Bicho, the score was levelled 1–1 at 90 minutes between the two teams, meaning that it had to be decided in penalty shootout. Here, Gill managed to save Maximiliano Romero's penalty to lead San Lorenzo to the semi-finals in a 8–7 score. Nonetheless, his team was ultimately eliminated in the semi-finals by the future champions CA Platense in a 0–1 score. Gill ended the Torneo Apertura with a total twelve goals conceded and nine clean sheets across nineteen matches. In the Torneo Clausura, San Lorenzo was eliminated early on by Central Cordoba (SdE) in the round of 16 after qualifying for the play-offs in fifth place inside Group B. He ended this half of the season with eight clean sheets with twelve goals conceded, accumulating a total of seventeen clean sheets and twenty-four goals conceded across the entire season.

In the Torneo Apertura of the 2026 AFA Liga Profesional de Fútbol, San Lorenzo qualified for the league's play-offs after finishing in the seventh place of Group A with twenty-two points. In this period, Gill accumulated eleven goals and became, contemporary, the tournament's goalkeeper with most clean sheets. His club was eliminated in the Round of 16 by CA River Plate in a 4–3 penalty shootout after the match had ended 2–2. Despite this, Gill saved a penalty from Kendry Páez during the shootout. In the derby game versus CA Huracán of the second half of the 2026 campaign, Gill headbutted Lucas Blondel after conceding a second goal and last goal of the match from Ecuadorian Jordy Caicedo. As a consequence, Gill was sent out and received a two fixture suspesion from the disciplinary court of the Argentine Football Association.

==== Lille OSC ====
Gill's match versus CA Huracán would prove to be his last in San Lorenzo, as on 26 August 2026, Gill joined Ligue 1 club Lille OSC, signing a five-year contract. The French club paid $4,650,000 to acquire half of his economical and sporting rights. On the other hand, San Lorenzo received $300,000 for his performances with Paraguay during the 2026 FIFA World Cup and repaid Gill a debt of $120,000. Gill made his debut with Lille on 17 October 2026 in a 1–1 draw against Brest, after starting in the bench for seven straight games.

== International career ==
Before debuting as professional, Gill was called up to the Paraguay U20 football teams to dispute 2019 South American U-20 Championship. During the tournament he only played in one game, a 3–0 loss to Ecuador. Later on, manager of the senior Paraguay national team, Gustavo Alfaro, was intrigued by Gill's playing in San Lorenzo. Subsequently, Gill was called up to debut in a 2026 FIFA World Cup qualification match over the Peru national team on 6 September 2025, where the Paraguayans won 1–0, keeping a clean sheet. In the remaining months of the year, he played four more games with the national team, all of them friendlies, where he conceded seven goals in total.

Gill at the 2026 FIFA World Cup's round of 16 match versus France. In this game he was named of the man of the match for his performances.

On 1 June 2026, Gill was announced as part of the Paraguay squad for the 2026 FIFA World Cup. Alfaro chose him as the first-choice goalkeeper following the friendlies he disputed. Paraguay's World Cup campaign started with a hammering 4–1 defeat versus the US national team. Gill faced criticism following the defeat, but Alfaro decided to continue trusting him. After this initial game, Paraguay bounced back and managed to qualify to the round of 32 as one of the eight best third-placed teams after defeating Turkey and drawing with Australia, with two clean sheets from Gill.

On 29 June 2026, Paraguay went up against Germany in a round of 32 clash. The match ended 1–1 after extra-time following goals from Matías Galarza Fonda for Paraguay and Kai Havertz for Germany; a second German goal was disallowed after Waldemar Anton was penalized for pushing Gill prior to the shot. In the ensuing penalty shootout, Gill was named man of the match after saving two key penalties from Kai Havertz and Nick Woltemade to help Paraguay advance to the round of 16. He was named man of the match again in the Round of 16 clash against France, which ended in a 1–0 defeat after a penalty by Kylian Mbappé. During the match, Gill saved four of out five shots on target coming from the French team, including a double save against Mbappé which was praised by The Guardian for its articulateness. Following the conclusion of the World Cup, Gill finished with the highest number of saves among all goalkeepers throughout the tournament, accumulating 23 in total.

== Style of play ==
A left-footed goalkeeper, Gill is, according to Opta Sports analysts, known for his shot-stopping ability, consistency, close range saves, and performances under pressure. Gill has cited Manuel Neuer and fellow retired Paraguayan goalkeeper José Luis Chilavert as primary inspirations, having incorporated free-kick taking into his own skill set in a similar fashion to Chilavert.

== Personal life ==
Gill married his wife in January 2021; she became pregnant the following year. Their son was born on 8 December 2022, after which both were hospitalized due to a troubling pregnancy and because she needed an emergency surgery. Because of this, Gill had to sell his Paraguay U-20 jersey from the 2019 South American U-20 Championship along with his other football equipment to support his wife and help cover medical expenses. Following Paraguay's triumph against Germany, the Municipal Council of San Lorenzo unanimously approved the proposal to award Gill the honour of Beloved Son (hijo dilecto) of San Lorenzo.

== Career statistics ==
=== Club ===
As of match played 17 October 2026

Club	Season	League			Cup (Note: Includes Copa Argentina)		Other		Total	
Club	Season	Division	Apps	Goals	Apps	Goals	Apps	Goals	Apps	Goals
Sportivo San Lorenzo	2020	Paraguayan Primera División	2	0	—		—		2	0
San Lorenzo	2024	Argentine Primera División	1	0	—		—		1	0
San Lorenzo	2025	Argentine Primera División	34	0	2	0	—		36	0
San Lorenzo	2026	Argentine Primera División	19	0	1	0	6 (Note: Appearances in Copa Sudamericana)	0	26	0
San Lorenzo	Total		54	0	3	0	6	0	63	0
Lille	2026–27	Ligue 1	1	0	0	0	0	0	1	0
Career total			57	0	3	0	6	0	66	0

=== International ===
As of match played 13 November 2026

Appearances and goals by national team and year
National team	Year	Apps	Goals
Paraguay	2025	4	0
Paraguay	2026	9	0
Total		13	0
