= Armando Farro =

Argentine footballer

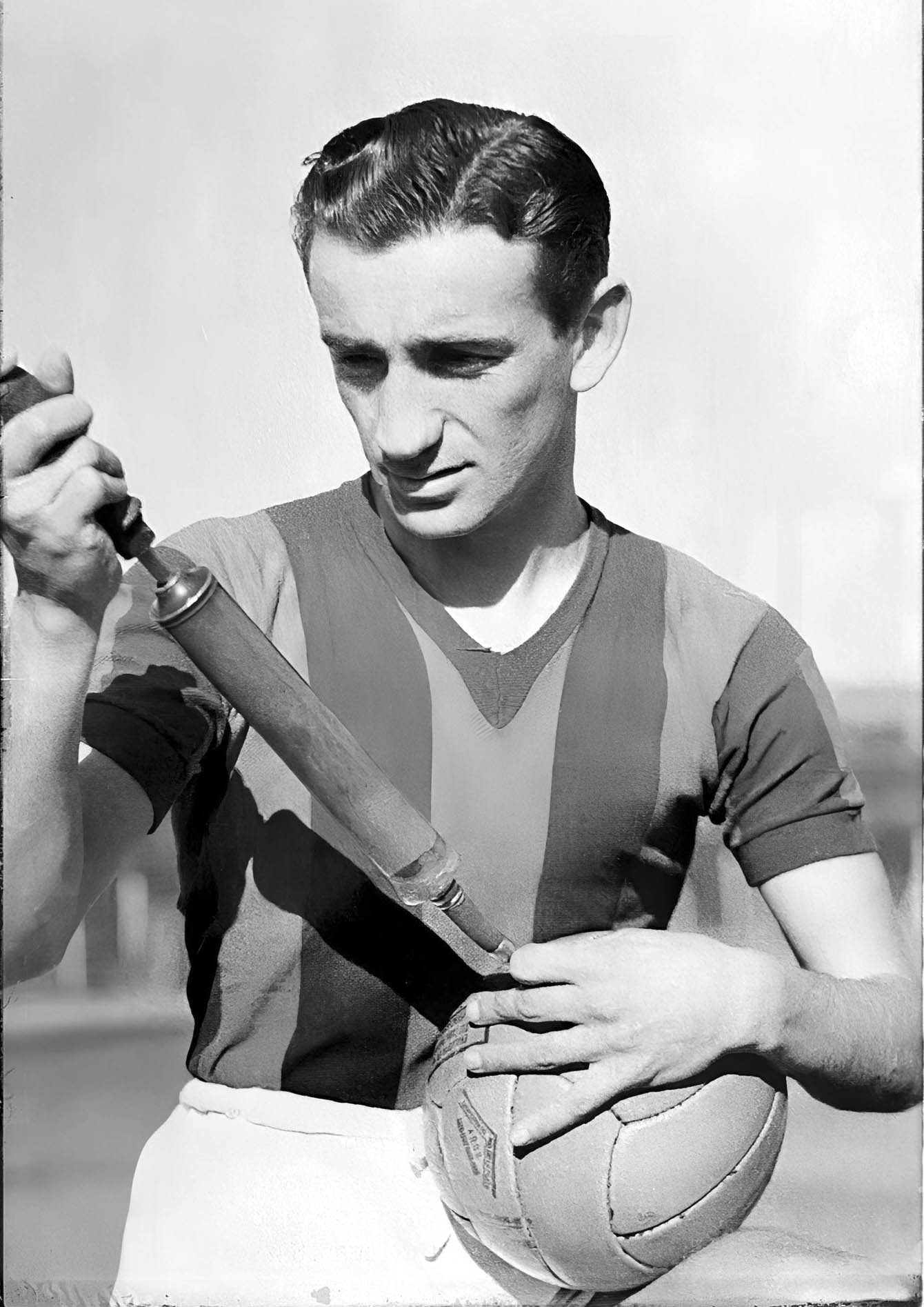
- Farro inflating a football during his tenure on San Lorenzo

Personal information
- Date of birth: 20 December 1922
- Date of death: 30 November 1982 (aged 59)
- Position: Forward

International career
Years	Team	Apps	(Gls)
1945	Argentina	2	(0)

Armando Farro (20 December 1922 – 30 November 1982) was an Argentine footballer. He played in two matches for the Argentina national football team in 1945. He was also part of Argentina's squad for the 1945 South American Championship.

== Honours ==
San Lorenzo

- Argentine Primera División: 1946

Argentina

- Copa América: 1945
