= 1978 Copa del Rey final =

Copa del Rey 1978 final
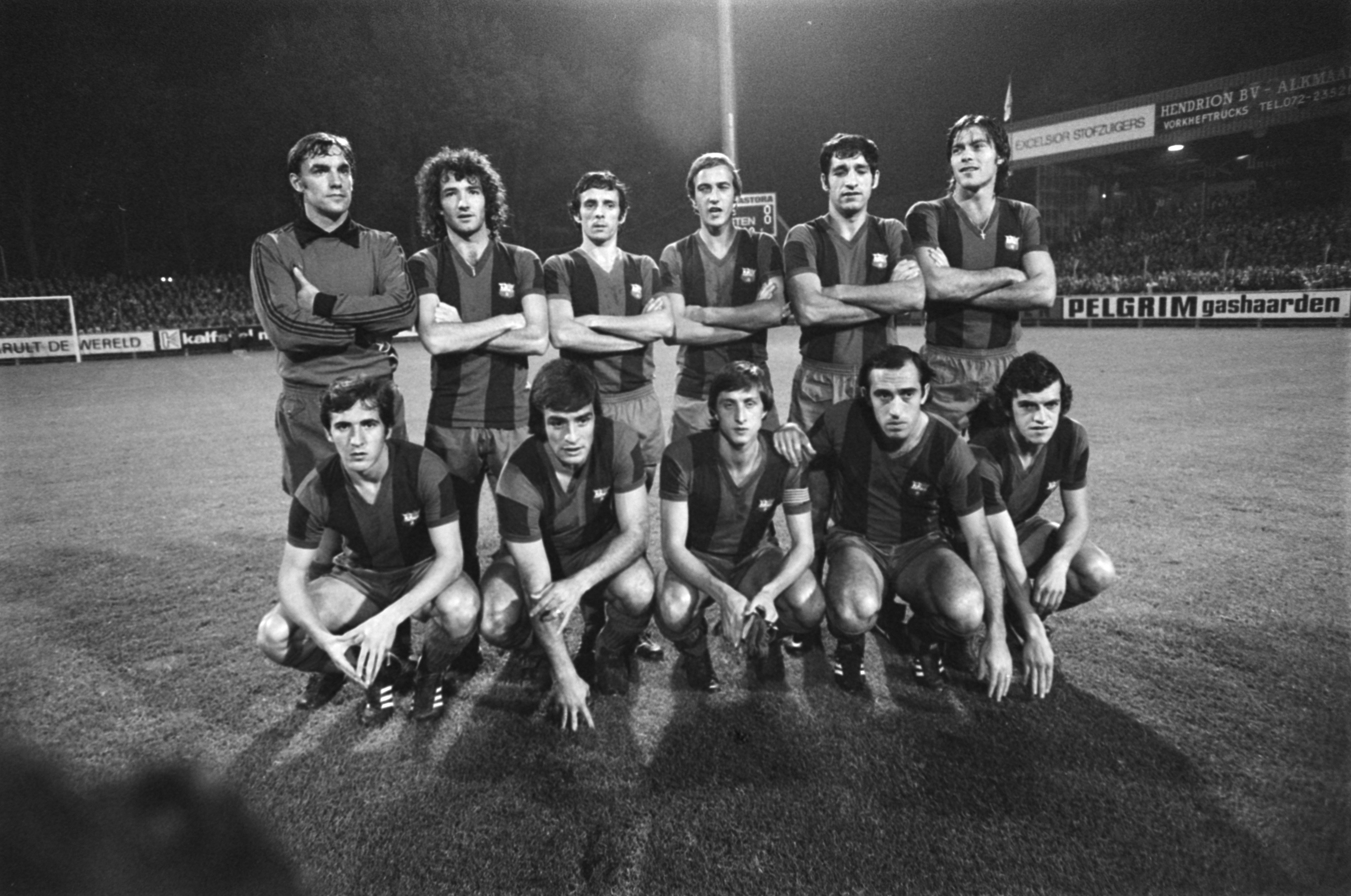
- Event: 1977–78 Copa del Rey
Barcelona	Las Palmas
3	1
- Date: 19 April 1978
- Venue: Santiago Bernabéu, Madrid
- Referee: Ángel Franco Martínez
- Attendance: 60,000

The 1978 Copa del Rey final was the 76th final of the King's Cup. The final was played at Santiago Bernabéu Stadium in Madrid, on 19 April 1978, being won by FC Barcelona, who beat Las Palmas 3–1.

== Match details ==
19 April 1978
21:00 CET

FC Barcelona	3–1	Las Palmas
Rexach 9' (pen.), 27'; Asensi 14'	Report	Brindisi 20'

Santiago Bernabéu Stadium, Madrid
Attendance: 60,000
Referee: Ángel Franco Martínez

Barcelona	Las Palmas

GK	1	(Spain) Pedro Valentín Mora
DF	4	(Spain) Antonio Olmo		(substituted off) 53'
DF	3	(Spain) Migueli
DF	6	(Netherlands) Johan Neeskens	(yellow card) 29'	(substituted off) 39'
DF	2	(Spain) Antonio de la Cruz
MF	8	(Spain) Carles Rexach
MF	5	(Argentina) Rafael Zuviría
MF	10	(Spain) Juan Manuel Asensi
FW	7	(Spain) Paco Fortes
FW	9	(Netherlands) Johan Cruyff (c)
FW	11	(Spain) Esteban
Substitutes:
MF	12	(Spain) José Macizo	(yellow card) 41'	(substituted on) 39'
DF	14	(Spain) Tente Sánchez		(substituted on) 53'
Manager:
(Netherlands) Rinus Michels

GK	1	(Argentina) Daniel Carnevali
DF	2	(Spain) Gerardo
DF	5	(Spain) Felipe
DF	4	(Spain) Roque
DF	3	(Spain) Guillermo Hernández (c)
MF	6	(Spain) Félix	(yellow card) 55'	(substituted off) 63'
MF	8	(Argentina) Miguel Ángel Brindisi
MF	10	(Spain) Jorge	(yellow card) 38'
MF	11	(Spain) Noly	(yellow card) 37'
FW	7	(Paraguay) Crispín Maciel
FW	9	(Argentina) Carlos Morete
Substitutes:
FW	15	(Spain) José Ángel Rivero		(substituted on) 63'
Manager:
(Spain) Miguel Muñoz

MATCH RULES

- 90 minutes.
- 30 minutes of extra-time if necessary.
- Penalty shoot-out if scores still level.
- Four named substitutes.
- Maximum of two substitutions.
