= René Houseman =

Argentine footballer

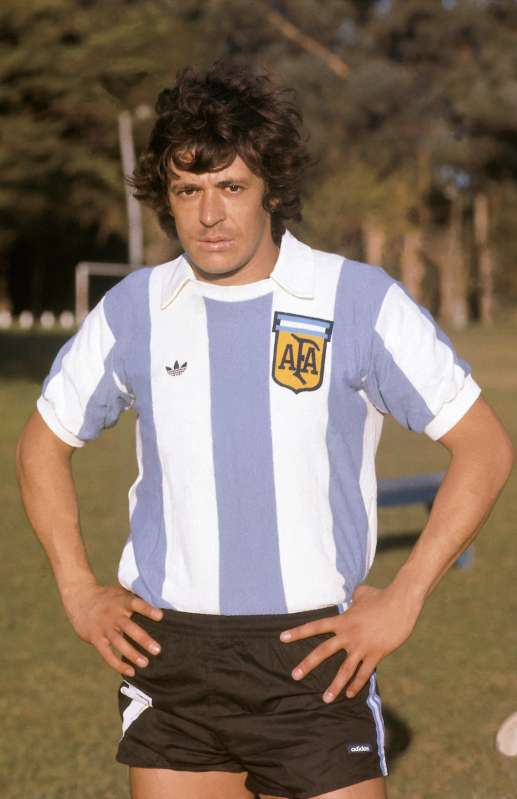
- Houseman with Argentina in 1978

Personal information
- Full name: René Orlando Houseman
- Date of birth: 19 July 1953
- Place of birth: La Banda, Argentina
- Date of death: 22 March 2018 (aged 64)
- Place of death: Buenos Aires, Argentina
- Height: 1.65 m (5 ft 5 in)
- Position: Winger

Senior career*
Years	Team	Apps	(Gls)
1971–1973	Defensores de Belgrano	38	(16)
1973–1980	Huracán	267	(110)
1981	River Plate	12	(1)
1982	Colo-Colo	18	(3)
1983	AmaZulu	12	(7)
1984	Independiente	3	(0)
1985	Excursionistas	1	(0)
Total		351	(137)

International career
1973–1979	Argentina	55	(13)
Medal record
Men's football
Representing Argentina
FIFA World Cup
Winner	1978 Argentina
- * Club domestic league appearances and goals

René Orlando Houseman (19 July 1953 – 22 March 2018), nicknamed Loco, was an Argentine footballer, who played as a right winger. At the beginning of his career, Houseman was considered a successor to well-known winger Omar Corbatta, being still regarded by many sports journalists as one of the best wingers ever.

Houseman was characterised by his notable dribbling ability speed, and mischief in the field.

== Club career ==
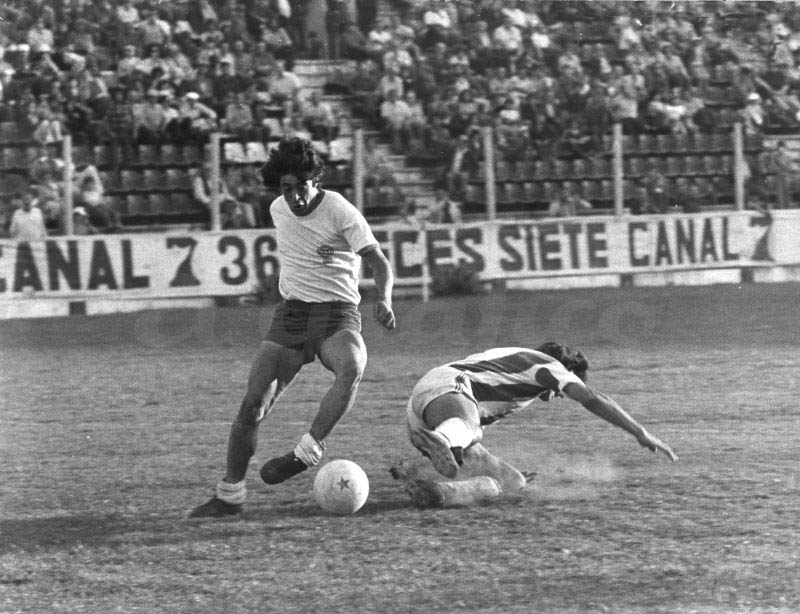
Houseman dribbling while playing for Huracán, 1973

Houseman was born in La Banda, Santiago del Estero Province. Despite having started his career at Club Atlético Excursionistas youth divisions, Houseman debuted professionally playing for Excursionistas's arch-rival Defensores de Belgrano, where he won its first title, the Primera C championship in 1971. At the beginning of 1973, as a recommendation by manager César Menotti, he was hired by Huracán.

Mother, don't worry because these legs will save you

— Houseman to his mother at the beginning of his career

Houseman was a key player of the Huracán team that won the 1973 Metropolitano championship. Managed by Menotti, that squad is where Houseman played along with various notable players such as Miguel Brindisi, Carlos Babington and Omar Larrosa.

Houseman is a mixture of Maradona and Garrincha

— César Menotti

After leaving Huracán in 1980, Houseman spent a short time in River Plate (one season, 1981), then moving to Chile to play for Colo Colo and then to South Africa when he joined AmaZulu.

In 1984, he returned to Argentina to play for Independiente, but he only played three matches in total. Nevertheless, Houseman was part of the roster that won the Libertadores and Intercontinental Cups that year.

Houseman retired from football in 1985, playing for his first club, Excursionistas, in a match versus Boca Juniors.

== International career ==
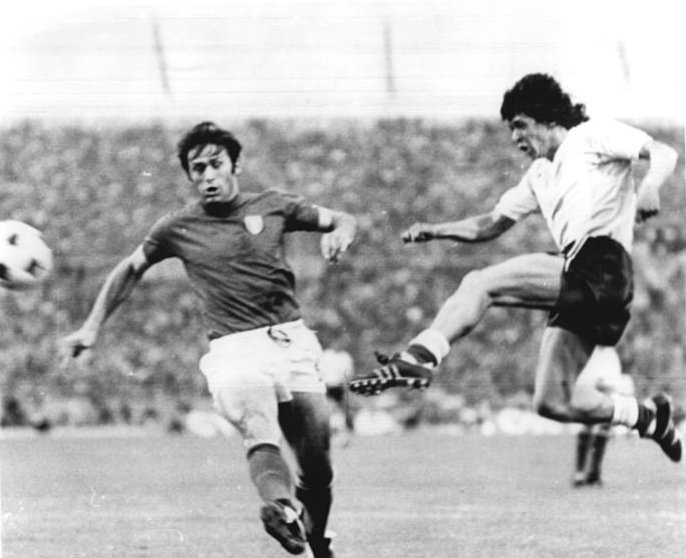
Houseman (right) and Italy's Tarcisio Burgnich at the 1974 FIFA World Cup

During his international career, Houseman also played for the Argentina national team and participated at the 1974 FIFA World Cup, where he scored three goals. His greatest achievement in football was being a member of the 1978 FIFA World Cup winning team and scoring in the 6–0 win over Peru.

== Post-retirement ==
Houseman was part of the coaching staff led by Ángel Cappa that managed Huracán between 2008 and 2009. He said he was never paid for his services.

== Personal life ==
Houseman's career was cut short due to problems with alcoholism, with which he struggled for most of his life. Houseman scored a goal versus River Plate which he later claimed not to remember as he was drunk throughout that game. In 2017, it was revealed that Houseman had tongue cancer. The Argentine Football Association announced that it would help him to afford medical treatment.

Houseman died on 22 March 2018 after a long battle with cancer, eight days after the death of his 1978 teammate, Rubén Galván.

== Honours ==
=== Club ===
Defensores de Belgrano

- Primera C: 1972

Huracán

- Primera División: 1973 Metropolitano; runner-up: 1975 Metropolitano, 1976 Metropolitano

Colo-Colo

- Copa Chile: 1982

Independiente

- Copa Libertadores: 1984
- Intercontinental Cup: 1984

=== International ===
Argentina

- FIFA World Cup: 1978
- Copa Newton: 1975, 1976
- Copa Lipton: 1976
- Copa Félix Bogado: 1976
- Copa Ramón Castilla: 1976, 1978
