= Ángel Zubieta =

Spanish footballer (1918–1985)

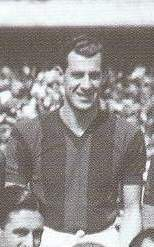

Personal information
- Full name: Ángel Zubieta Redondo
- Date of birth: 17 July 1918
- Place of birth: Galdakao, Spain
- Date of death: 28 October 1985 (aged 67)
- Place of death: Buenos Aires, Argentina
- Position: Inside right

Senior career*
Years	Team	Apps	(Gls)
1935–1936	Athletic Bilbao	22	(2)
1938–1939	Club Deportivo Euzkadi	9	(0)
1939–1952	San Lorenzo	352	(29)
1952–1956	Deportivo La Coruña	56	(2)

International career
1936	Spain	2	(0)
1937–1938	Basque Country	34	(0)

Managerial career
- 1956–1957: Deportivo La Coruña
- 1962–1963: Athletic Bilbao
- 1963: Real Valladolid
- 1964: Belenenses
- 1968–1969: Belenenses
- 1969–1970: Real Jaén
- 1970–1974: Pumas UNAM
- * Club domestic league appearances and goals

Ángel Zubieta Redondo (17 July 1918 – 28 October 1985) was a Spanish football player and manager.

== Playing career ==
Zubieta was born in Galdakao, Biscay, Basque Country. He started his playing career in the 1935–36 season for Athletic Bilbao at the age of 17. His impressive performances earned him a call-up to the Spain national team in 1936, making him the youngest player ever to play for Spain at the time, with an age of only 17 years and 9 months.

Later in 1936 the Spanish Civil War disrupted his playing career. During the conflict he played for the Basque Country national team. The team undertook a tour of South America and in 1939 Zubieta was signed by Argentine side San Lorenzo de Almagro. Zubieta stayed with the club for 13 seasons, playing 352 games for the club, scoring 29 goals. He occupies 3rd place on the list of San Lorenzo players with most games for the club During his time at the club, they won the Argentine Primera in 1946 and the Copa Río de La Plata in the same year.

In 1952 Zubieta returned to Spain, joining Deportivo de La Coruña where he played until his retirement in 1956 at the age of 38.

== Managerial career ==
After retiring as a player Zubieta took up management. He had spells in charge of Athletic Bilbao (1962–1963) Real Valladolid (1963–1964) as well as managing in Portugal Belenenses and in Mexico Real Jaén (1969–1970) and Pumas UNAM (1970–1974).

Zubieta also returned to Argentina working as manager of Club Atlético Atlanta amongst other teams. He died in Buenos Aires on 28 October 1985 of amyotrophic lateral sclerosis.

== Honours ==
Athletic Bilbao

- La Liga: 1935–36

San Lorenzo

- Copa de la República: 1943
- Primera División Argentina: 1946
- Copa Río de La Plata: 1946

== Family ==
His brother Santi Zubieta played for Atletico Aviacion.
