= Daniel Carnevali =

Argentine footballer (born 1946)

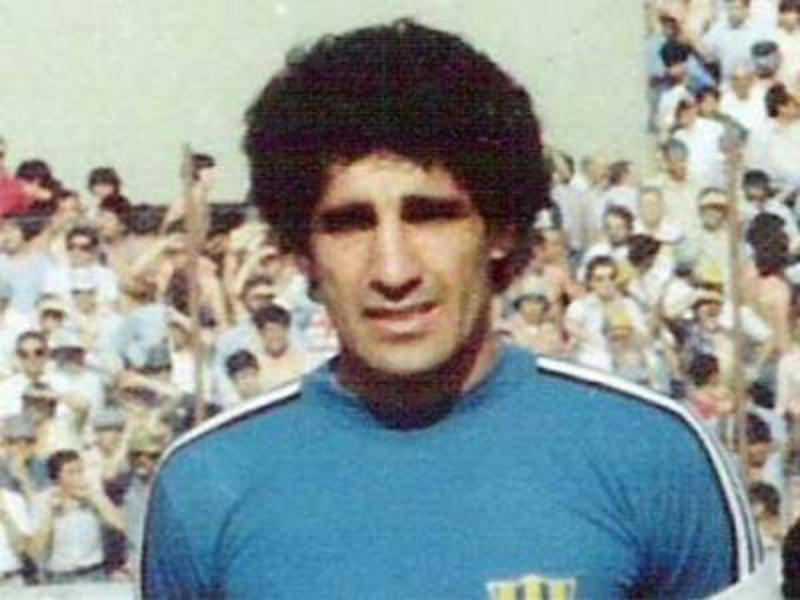
- Carnevali with Rosario Central

Personal information
- Full name: Daniel Alberto Carnevali Spurchesi
- Date of birth: 4 December 1946 (age 79)
- Place of birth: Rosario, Argentina
- Height: 1.77 m (5 ft 10 in)
- Position: Goalkeeper

Youth career
- Rosario Central

Senior career*
Years	Team	Apps	(Gls)
1967–1969	Rosario Central	4	(0)
1969	Atlanta	38	(0)
1970–1973	Chacarita Juniors	136	(0)
1973–1979	Las Palmas	194	(0)
1979–1982	Rosario Central	121	(0)
1983	Atlético Junior		
1984	Atlanta	38	(0)
1985–1988	Colón	105	(0)
1988–91	Central Córdoba	30	(0)

International career
1972–1974	Argentina	26	(0)
- * Club domestic league appearances and goals

Daniel Alberto Carnevali (born 4 December 1946) is an Argentine retired football goalkeeper who played for the Argentina national team in the 1970s.

== Club career ==
During his club career, he played for several clubs, most notably Rosario Central, where he won the Nacional 1980 and Las Palmas in Spain. His other clubs included Atlanta, Chacarita Juniors, Atlético Junior of Colombia and Colón, where he eventually finished his career at the age of 43.

Carnevali played 425 games in the Argentine leagues and over 600 games in all competitions.

== International career ==
Carnevali was the starting goalkeeper for the Argentina national team in the 1974 FIFA World Cup in the first 5 matches, until taken over by Ubaldo Fillol in the last match.

== Honours ==
Las Palmas

- Copa del Rey runner-up: 1978

Rosario Central

- Primera División Argentina: Nacional 1980
