= Oscar Rossi =

Argentine footballer

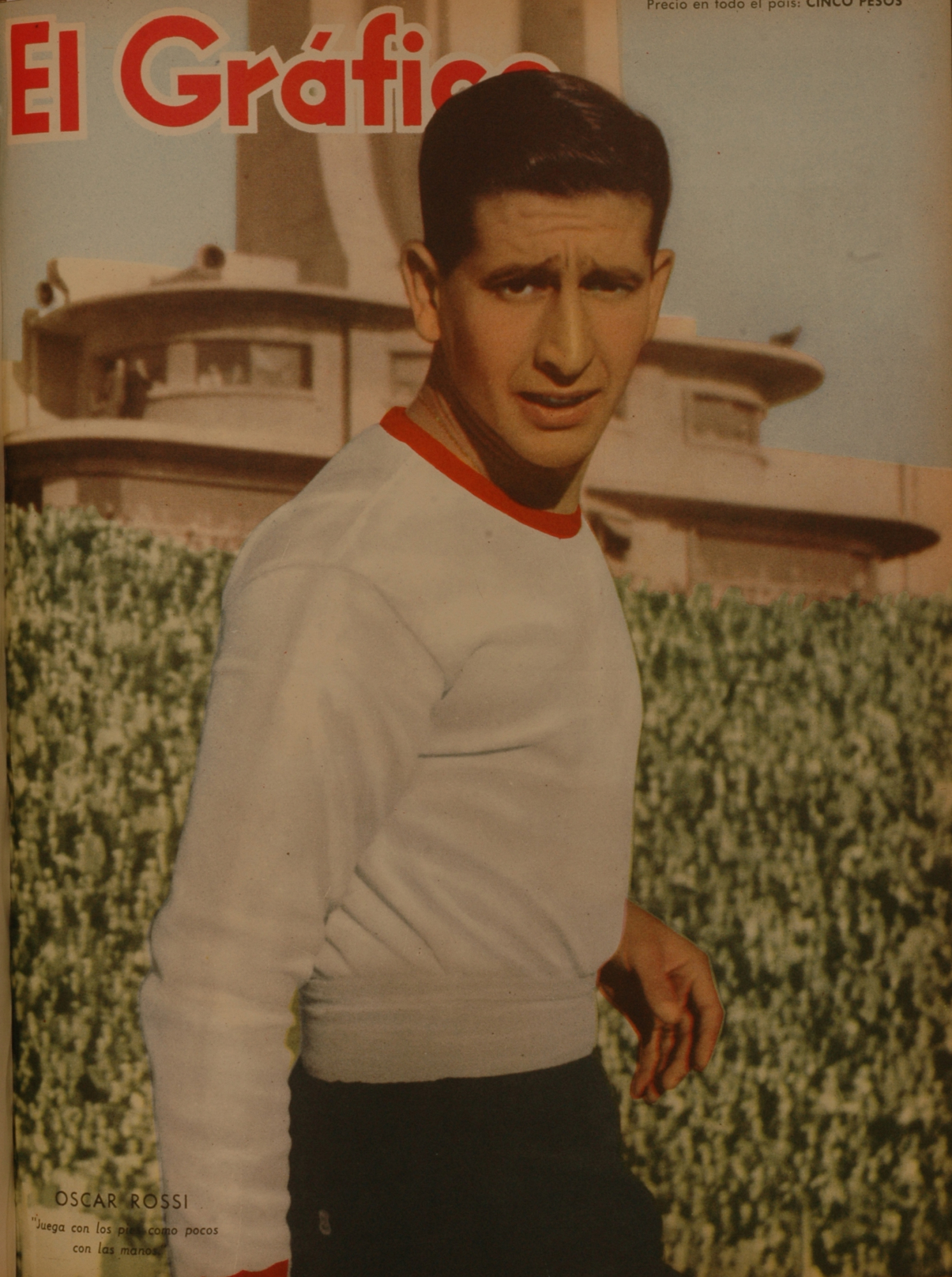

Personal information
- Full name: Oscar Pablo Rossi
- Date of birth: 27 July 1930
- Place of birth: Buenos Aires, Argentina
- Date of death: 6 September 2012 (aged 82)
- Place of death: Buenos Aires, Argentina
- Height: 1.71 m (5 ft 7 in)
- Position: Midfielder

Senior career*
Years	Team	Apps	(Gls)
1950–1953	Huracán		
1954	Racing	9	(2)
1955–1959	Huracán		
1960–1964	San Lorenzo	104	(23)
1965	Atletico Nacional		
1966	Sporting Cristal		
1967	Almagro	9	(1)
- Huracán
Total		287	(69)

International career
1956–1963	Argentina	20	(0)

Managerial career
- 1978-1980: San Miguel
- * Club domestic league appearances and goals

Oscar Pablo Rossi (27 July 1930 – 6 September 2012), nicknamed Coco, was an Argentine association football player. During his career in the 1950s and 1960s, Rossi played for several clubs from Buenos Aires and was a member of the Argentine squad in the 1962 FIFA World Cup.

== Club career ==
Born in the Parque Patricios district of Buenos Aires, Rossi began his career in 1950 at the local side Club Atlético Huracán, where he played until 1953 before spending a year in 1954 with Racing Club de Avellaneda. After the brief spell with Racing, he returned to Huracán and played for them between 1955 and 1959. In 1960, he moved to another Buenos Aires side, San Lorenzo de Almagro. While at San Lorenzo, he formed a successful partnership with José Sanfilippo and competed in the 1960 Copa Libertadores, the competition's inaugural edition, where they were knocked out in the semi-final by Uruguayan side C.A. Peñarol.

Rossi stayed with San Lorenzo until 1964. In 1967, he briefly played for Club Almagro, and his playing career ended in 1969 at Huracán. He played a total of 287 matches and scored 69 goals in the Argentine Primera División.

== International career ==
Manager Juan Carlos Lorenzo, who coached San Lorenzo from 1961 to 1962 before taking over the Argentina national football team, called up Rossi and four other San Lorenzo players for the 1962 FIFA World Cup in Chile. In the tournament, Rossi played only in their opening 1–0 win against Bulgaria. After suffering a 3–1 defeat against England and a goalless draw against Hungary, the team failed to progress further.

A year later, Rossi was a member of the Argentina squad that won third place in the 1963 South American Championship behind Bolivia and Paraguay, with Rossi appearing in four out of six games in the tournament.

After retiring from playing, Rossi briefly worked as a coach and had a managing spell in 1978 at Club Atlético San Miguel, who were at the time in Primera D Metropolitana.
