= Carlos Babington =

Argentine footballer (1949–2026)

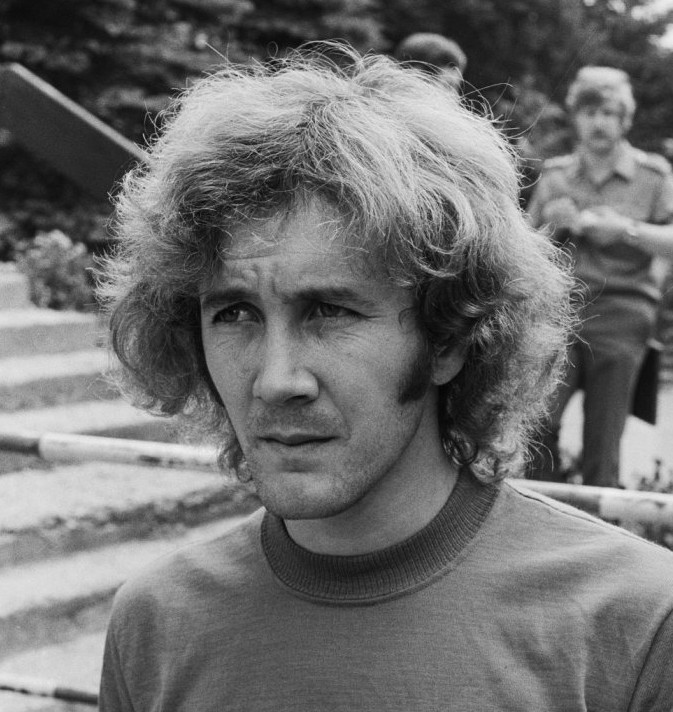
- Babington in 1974

Personal information
- Full name: Carlos Alberto Babington
- Date of birth: 20 September 1949
- Place of birth: Buenos Aires, Argentina
- Date of death: 11 November 2026 (aged 77)
- Height: 1.75 m (5 ft 9 in)
- Position: Attacking midfielder

Senior career*
Years	Team	Apps	(Gls)
1969–1974	Huracán	190	(81)
1974–1978	SG Wattenscheid 09	120	(46)
1978–1982	Huracán	115	(45)
1982	Tampa Bay Rowdies	20	(3)
1983	Atlético Junior	34	(26)

International career
1973–1974	Argentina	13	(2)
- * Club domestic league appearances and goals

Carlos Alberto Babington (20 September 1949 – 11 November 2026) was an Argentine professional footballer who played as an attacking midfielder. He represented the Argentina national team at the 1974 World Cup.

== Early life ==
Babington (nicknamed "El Inglés" – The Englishman) was born in Buenos Aires. His grandfather was Colville Burroughs Babington, who moved to Argentina and married Laureana Carro in 1889. His great-grandfather, Benjamin, was the son of Benjamin Guy Babington and grandson of William Babington who has a statue in St. Paul's Cathedral.

== Playing career ==
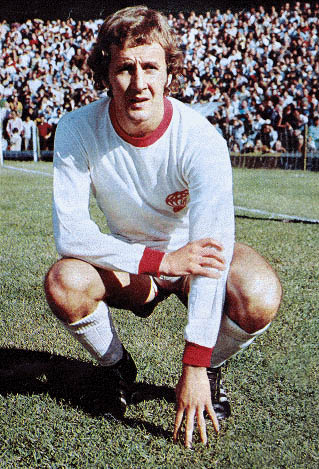
Babington in Huracán, where he won the only title of his career

Babington started his career as a footballer at Club Atlético Huracán in 1969. With Huracán, Babington was part of the team that won the 1973 Metropolitano. Managed by César Menotti, that squad is widely regarded as one of the best Argentine teams ever, with Babington being a key player along with René Houseman, Miguel Brindisi and Omar Larrosa.

In 1974, he was transferred to the German team SG Wattenscheid 09, though he had also considered an offer from Stoke City due to his English ancestry.

He returned to Huracán in 1979 and played for the club until 1982, when he moved to Florida, United States, to play for the Tampa Bay Rowdies. In 1983, he played for Atlético Junior of Barranquilla, Colombia where he ended his career due to personal matters. He retired from football later that year.

Babington scored 126 goals for Huracán in his eight years with the club.

== Managerial career ==
As a manager, Babington coached Platense, Banfield, Racing, River Plate, León Fútbol Club (Mexico), Chacarita Juniors and Huracán. As Huracán manager, he won two Second Division championships in 1990 and 2000, helping Huracán to return to Primera División.

In 2006 Babington was elected as Huracán's president. Under his administration, the team achieved another promotion to Primera División, remaining in the top division until the 2010–11 season when Huracán would be relegated again.

Babington and Daniel Passarella (of River Plate) are the only people to have been player, manager and president of a single football club in Argentina.

== Death ==
Babington died on 11 November 2026, at the age of 77.

== Honours ==
=== Player ===
Huracán

- Primera División: 1973 Metropolitano

=== Manager ===
Huracán

- Primera B Nacional: 1989–90, 1999–2000
