= Miguel Ángel Brindisi =

Argentine football player and manager (born 1950)

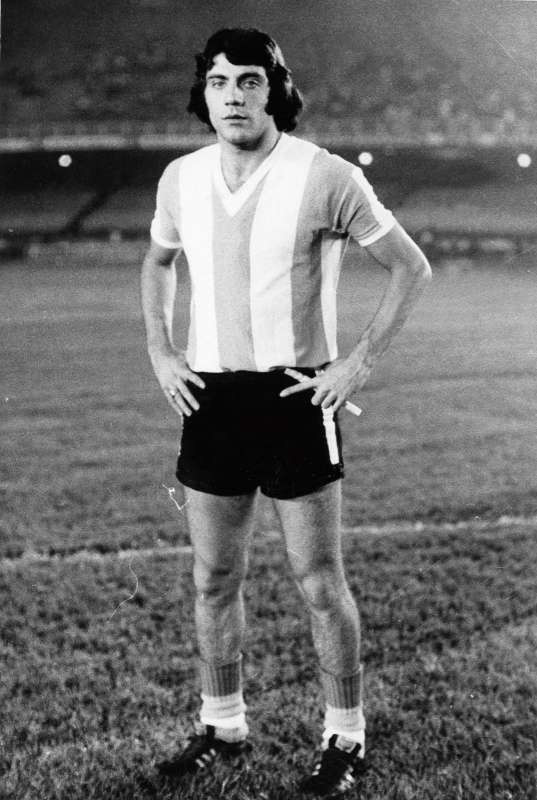
- Brindisi with the Argentina national team, 1974

Personal information
- Date of birth: 8 October 1950 (age 76)
- Place of birth: Buenos Aires, Argentina
- Positions: Attacking midfielder; striker

Senior career*
Years	Team	Apps	(Gls)
1967–1976	Huracán	320	(155)
1976–1978	Las Palmas	92	(29)
1978–1981	Huracán	29	(11)
1981–1983	Boca Juniors	78	(27)
1983	Nacional	19	(3)
1984	Racing Club	38	(9)
1985	Municipal		(2)
Total		576	(236)

International career
1969–1974	Argentina	46	(17)

Managerial career
- 1986: Alumni de Villa María
- 1987–1988: Municipal
- 1989–1991: Barcelona SC
- 1991–1992: Las Palmas
- 1994–1997: Guatemala
- 1994–1995: Independiente
- 1998–1999: Espanyol
- 2001–2003: Huracán
- 2003: Racing Club
- 2003–2004: Lanús
- 2004–2005: Boca Juniors
- 2005–2007: Comunicaciones
- 2008: Atlas
- 2008–2009: Jaguares
- 2010–2011: Huracán
- 2013: Independiente
- * Club domestic league appearances and goals

Miguel Ángel Brindisi de Marco (born 8 October 1950) is an Argentine football coach and former player. An attacking midfielder, he played for the Argentina national team at the 1974 FIFA World Cup.

== Playing career ==
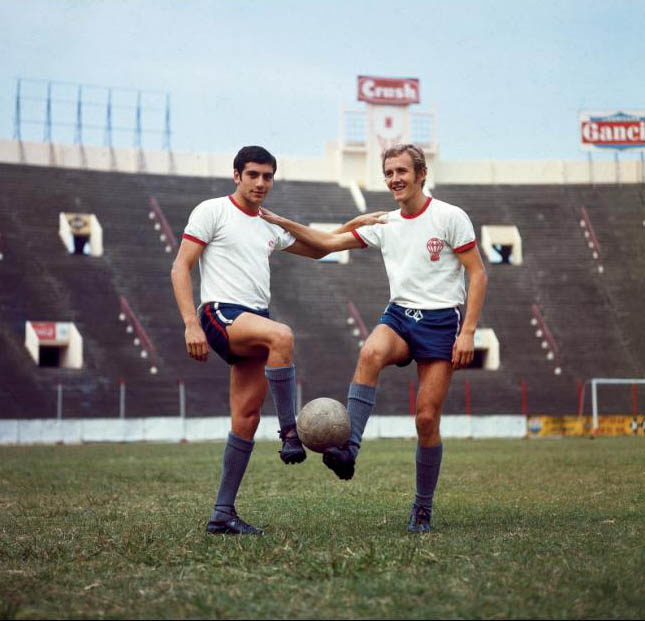
Brindisi (left) and Carlos Babington, key players of Huracán in 1973

Born in the Almagro neighborhood of Buenos Aires, Brindisi played most of his career in two spells at Club Atlético Huracán, but he also had spells with Spanish side UD Las Palmas, Uruguayan side Nacional and Argentine teams Boca Juniors and with Racing Club during their spell in the Second Division. Whilst at Las Palmas he helped them to the 1978 Copa del Rey Final where his goal was unable to prevent them losing 3–1 to FC Barcelona.

Brindisi was part of two Argentine championship winning sides, his first title was the 1973 Metropolitano with Club Atlético Huracán. Managed by César Menotti, that squad is widely regarded as one of the best Argentine teams ever, with Brindisi being a key player along with René Houseman, Carlos Babington and Omar Larrosa.

After some seasons playing abroad Argentina, Brindisi was traded to Boca Juniors, where he won his second title, the 1981 Metropolitano. Coached by Silvio Marzolini, Brindisi made a memorable duo with Diego Maradona, also scoring many goals for the team.

Brindisi was also the Argentine Primera's top scorer in the Metropolitano championship of 1972 with 21 goals.

Brindisi played for the Argentina national team making 46 appearances and scoring 17 goals.

== Managerial career ==
Brindisi made his debut as a head coach with Club Alumni de Villa María in 1986 his next club was CSD Municipal of Guatemala, which he led to the Liga Nacional de Guatemala title in 1987 and 1988. The next club team Brindisi took charge of was Barcelona Sporting Club in Ecuador where he lad the team to the national championship in 1989 and 1991 and to the Libertadores Cup finals in 1990. He then had spells in charge of RCD Espanyol and UD Las Palmas in Spain. After managing in Guatemala several years he went on to become coach of the Guatemala national team, of which he was in charge during the 1994 World Cup qualification process and on a second tenure in 1997. Brindisi took over at Club Atlético Independiente in the Primera division, he helped the club to win three titles; Clausura 1994, Supercopa Sudamericana 1994 and Recopa Sudamericana 1995. Brindisi then had a spell in charge of his former club and Independiente's fiercest rivals; Racing Club, and a period in charge of Huracán. Brindisi took over at Club Atlético Lanús in 2003, then became manager of Boca Juniors in July 2004, but resigned after only 22 games following a defeat to River Plate. He then became manager of Comunicaciones in 2005.

Brindisi was the head coach of Chiapas of Mexico and was fired on 5 May 2009.

He was appointed as the manager for Huracán in September 2009 and was resigned due to serious danger of relegation on the 2010/11 seasons.

In November 2014, it was reported that he is one of the coaches who applied for vacant India job.

== Honours ==
=== Player ===
Huracán

- Primera División: 1973 Metropolitano

Las Palmas

- Copa del Rey runner-up: 1977–78

Boca Juniors

- Primera División: 1981 Metropolitano

Nacional

- Primera División: 1983

Individual

- Argentine Primera División top scorer: 1972 Metropolitano (21 goals)
- Footballer of the Year of Argentina: 1973
- South American Footballer of the Year Silver Award: 1973
- La Liga Team of The Year: 1979
- AFA Team of All Time (published 2015)

=== Manager ===
CSD Municipal

- Liga Nacional: 1987, 1988

Barcelona S.C.

- Campeonato Ecuatoriano de Fútbol: 1989, 1991
- Copa Libertadores runner-up: 1990

Independiente

- Primera División: 1994 Clausura
- Supercopa Sudamericana: 1994
- Recopa Sudamericana: 1995
