= 1942 Argentine Primera División =

51st season of top-tier football league in Argentina

Primera División
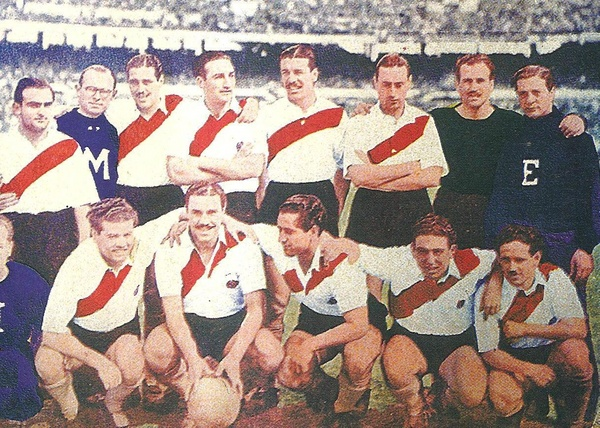
- River Plate, champions
- Season: 1942
- Champions: River Plate (7th title)
- Promoted: Chacarita Juniors
- Relegated: Tigre
- 1942 Copa Aldao: River Plate
- Top goalscorer: (Argentina) Rinaldo Martino (San Lorenzo) (25 goals)

The 1942 Argentine Primera División was the 51st season of top-flight football in Argentina. The season began on April 3 and ended on November 22.

There were 16 teams in the tournament, with the addition of Chacarita Juniors as promoted last year. River Plate won the championship while Tigre was relegated to Segunda División.

== League standings ==
Pos	Team	Pld	W	D	L	GF	GA	GD	Pts
1	River Plate	30	20	6	4	79	37	+42	46
2	San Lorenzo	30	16	8	6	70	50	+20	40
3	Huracán	30	14	9	7	62	49	+13	37
4	Newell's Old Boys	30	15	6	9	70	43	+27	36
5	Boca Juniors	30	14	7	9	65	41	+24	35
6	Estudiantes (LP)	30	13	7	10	61	59	+2	33
7	Banfield	30	11	7	12	58	62	−4	29
8	Racing	30	9	10	11	56	58	−2	28
8	Independiente	30	10	8	12	45	57	−12	28
10	Ferro Carril Oeste	30	9	9	12	45	52	−7	27
11	Platense	30	9	8	13	51	55	−4	26
12	Chacarita Juniors	30	7	11	12	40	59	−19	25
13	Gimnasia y Esgrima (LP)	30	7	10	13	45	65	−20	24
13	Lanús	30	8	8	14	37	58	−21	24
15	Atlanta	30	10	3	17	65	67	−2	23
16	Tigre	30	6	7	17	46	83	−37	19
