= Antonio Ameijenda =

Spanish/Argentine footballer and coach

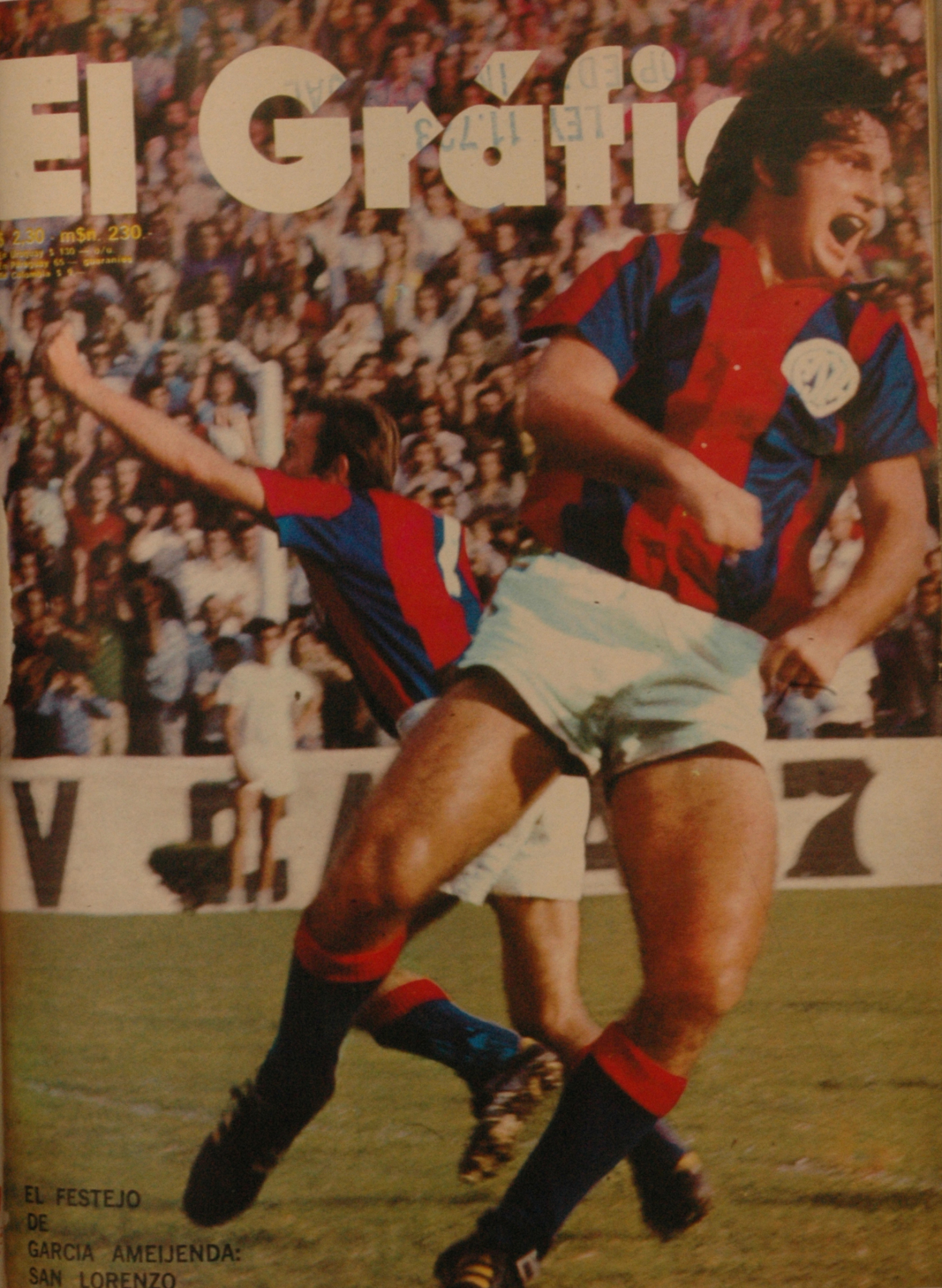
- García Ameijenda on El Gráfico in 1972

Personal information
- Full name: Antonio García Ameijenda
- Date of birth: 11 February 1948 (age 78)
- Place of birth: Cabanas, Galicia, Spain
- Position: Midfielder

Senior career*
Years	Team	Apps	(Gls)
1967–1974	San Lorenzo	137	(24)
1975	Estudiantes	28	(0)
1975–1978	UD Salamanca	62	(7)
1978	Huracán	5	(0)
1979	Gimnasia	14	(0)
1980	Deportivo Armenio		
1981	Club Almagro		
- * Club domestic league appearances and goals

Antonio García Ameijenda (born 11 February 1948 in Cabanas, Spain) is a Spanish former footballer and coach. He was an offensive playmaker. As a coach, he was a longtime member of the coaching staff of Hector Veira.
