= Roque Avallay =

Argentine footballer (1945–2026)

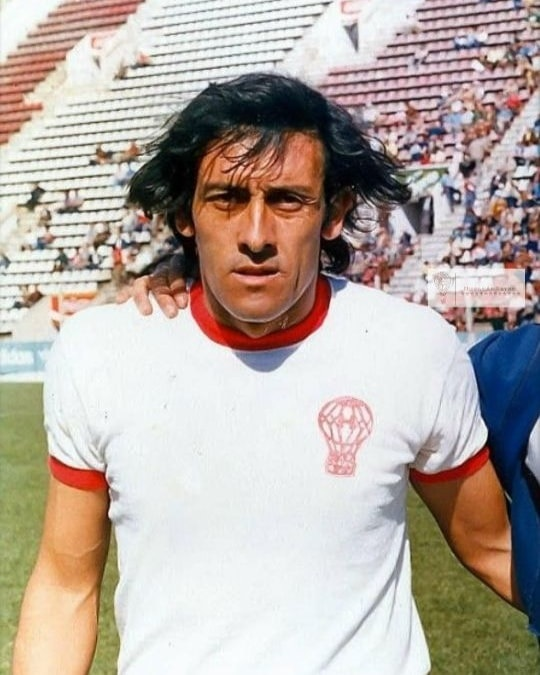
- Avallay in Huracán c. 1975

Personal information
- Full name: Roque Alberto Avallay
- Date of birth: 14 December 1945
- Place of birth: San Rafael, Mendoza Province, Argentina
- Date of death: 2 May 2026 (aged 80)
- Position: Forward

Youth career
- 1964: Deportivo Maipú

Senior career*
| Years | Team | Apps | (Gls) |
| 1965–1966 | Independiente | 20 | (5) |
| 1966–1969 | Newell's Old Boys | 145 | (51) |
| 1970–1976 | Huracán | 217 (total) | (70) |
| 1976 | Atlanta | 36 | (6) |
| 1977 | Chacarita Juniors | 44 | (22) |
| 1977–1979 | Racing Club | 60 | (30) |
| 1979–1980 | Huracán | (see above) | |

International career
| 1968–1974 | Argentina | 15 | (1) |
- * Club domestic league appearances and goals

Roque Alberto Avallay (14 December 1945 – 2 May 2026) was an Argentine footballer who played as a forward for a number of clubs in Argentina and represented the Argentina national team.

== Career ==
Avallay started his career with Deportivo Maipú in 1964 and was soon signed by Independiente of the Primera División Argentina. In his first year with the club, they won the Copa Libertadores 1965.

In 1966 Avallay moved to Rosario to play for Newell's Old Boys, it was in 1968 that he received his first call-up to play for the Argentina national team.

In 1970 Avallay joined Huracán of Buenos Aires. He was part of the team that won the Metropolitano 1973 championship.

In later years Avallay played for Atlanta, Chacarita Juniors and Racing Club before returning to Huracán in 1979.

Avallay retired from playing at the end of 1980 with a total of 184 goals in 522 games in the Argentine Primera, leaving him in 14th place on the all-time list of top scorers. He later went into coaching and youth development work, and worked with the Huracán youth team.

== Death ==
Avallay died on 2 May 2026, at the age of 80.

== Honours ==
Independiente

- Copa Libertadores: 1965

Huracán

- Argentine Primera División: Metropolitano 1973
