= 1959 Argentine Primera División =

68th season of top-tier football league in Argentina

Primera División
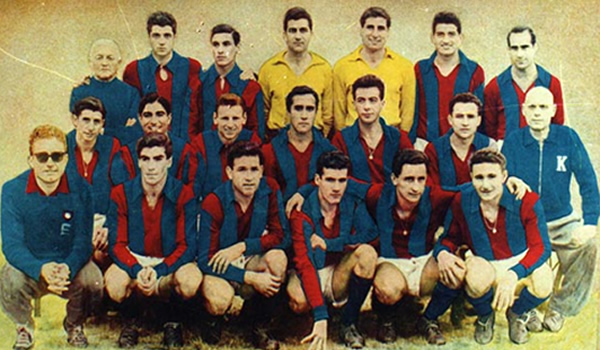
- San Lorenzo, champions
- Season: 1959
- Champions: San Lorenzo (7th title)
- Promoted: Ferro Carril Oeste
- Relegated: Central Córdoba (R)
- 1960 Copa Libertadores: San Lorenzo
- Top goalscorer: (Argentina) José Sanfilippo (31 goals)

The 1959 Argentine Primera División was the 68th season of top-flight football in Argentina. The season began on May 3 and ended on November 20. From this season, the AFA allowed substitutions for the first time, but only for an injured goalkeeper. It was the referee who had to check out the injury before allowing the substitution.

San Lorenzo de Almagro achieved its 7th title, also qualifying for the first edition of Copa Libertadores, the international competition organised by CONMEBOL after Copa Aldao has been discontinued since 1955. Central Córdoba (R) was relegated to Primera B.

== League standings ==
Pos	Team	Pld	W	D	L	GF	GA	GD	Pts
1	San Lorenzo	30	21	3	6	75	42	+33	45
2	Racing	30	17	4	9	80	48	+32	38
3	Independiente	30	11	11	8	44	37	+7	33
4	Ferro Carril Oeste	30	10	13	7	47	41	+6	33
5	River Plate	30	14	4	12	49	45	+4	32
6	Newell's Old Boys	30	12	8	10	35	36	−1	32
7	Atlanta	30	9	14	7	34	35	−1	32
8	Boca Juniors	30	12	6	12	51	44	+7	30
9	Huracán	30	9	12	9	46	57	−11	30
10	Estudiantes (LP)	30	10	8	12	52	62	−10	28
11	Lanús	30	10	7	13	54	59	−5	27
12	Vélez Sarsfield	30	6	14	10	43	46	−3	26
13	Argentinos Juniors	30	7	11	12	46	45	+1	25
14	Gimnasia y Esgrima (LP)	30	9	7	14	49	62	−13	25
15	Rosario Central	30	8	7	15	38	50	−12	23
16	Central Córdoba (R)	30	7	7	16	32	66	−34	21

== Relegation table ==
Pos	Team	1957	1958	1959	Total	Average
1º	San Lorenzo	38	38	45	121	40,33
2º	Racing	36	41	38	115	38,33
3º	River Plate	46	35	32	113	37,67
4º	Boca Juniors	34	38	30	102	34,00
5º	Ferro Carril Oeste	-	-	33	33	33,00
6º	Independiente	31	33	33	97	32,33
7º	Vélez Sarsfield	34	34	26	94	31,33
8º	Atlanta	24	36	32	92	30,67
9º	Estudiantes (LP)	33	31	28	92	30,67
10º	Huracán	33	27	30	90	30,00
11º	Rosario Central	27	35	23	85	28,33
12º	Newell's Old Boys	31	17	32	80	26,67
13º	Argentinos Juniors	28	25	25	78	26,00
14º	Lanús	22	25	27	74	24,67
15º	Gimnasia y Esgrima (LP)	23	24	25	72	24,00
16º	Central Córdoba (R)	-	27	21	48	24,00
