= Norberto Boggio =

Argentine footballer (1931–2021)

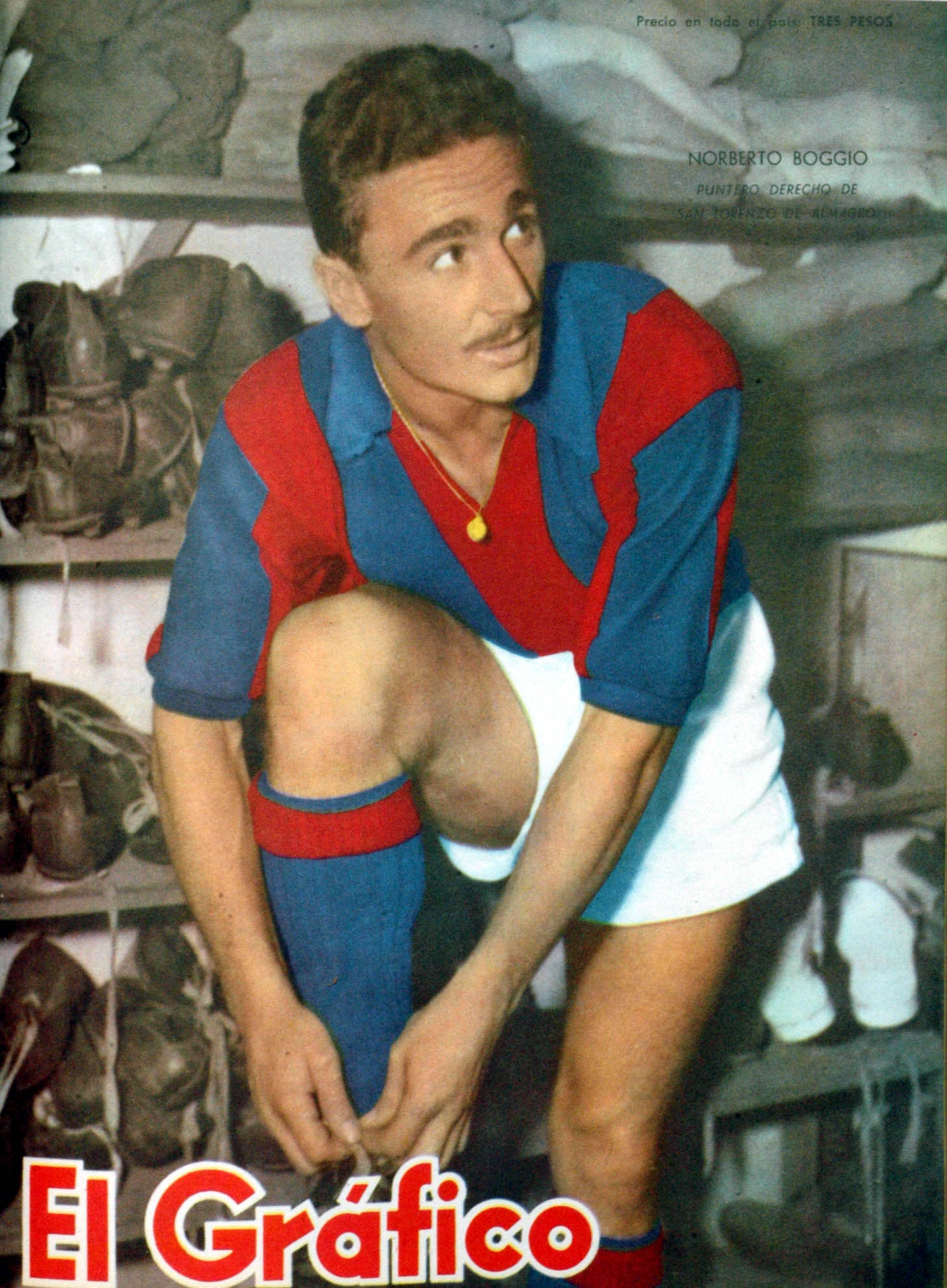

Personal information
- Full name: Norberto Constante Boggio
- Date of birth: 11 August 1931
- Place of birth: Carreras, Argentina
- Date of death: 20 December 2021 (aged 90)
- Height: 1.71 m (5 ft 7 in)
- Position: Forward

Senior career*
Years	Team	Apps	(Gls)
1949–1956	Banfield		
1957–1962	San Lorenzo de Almagro		
1963–1971	Atlante		

International career
- Argentina
- * Club domestic league appearances and goals

Norberto Constante Boggio (11 August 1931 – 20 December 2021) was an Argentine footballer who played as a forward for Argentina in the 1958 FIFA World Cup. At club level, he played for Banfield, San Lorenzo de Almagro and Mexican club Atlante. Boggio died on 20 December 2021, at the age of 90.
