= Llamil Simes =

Argentine footballer

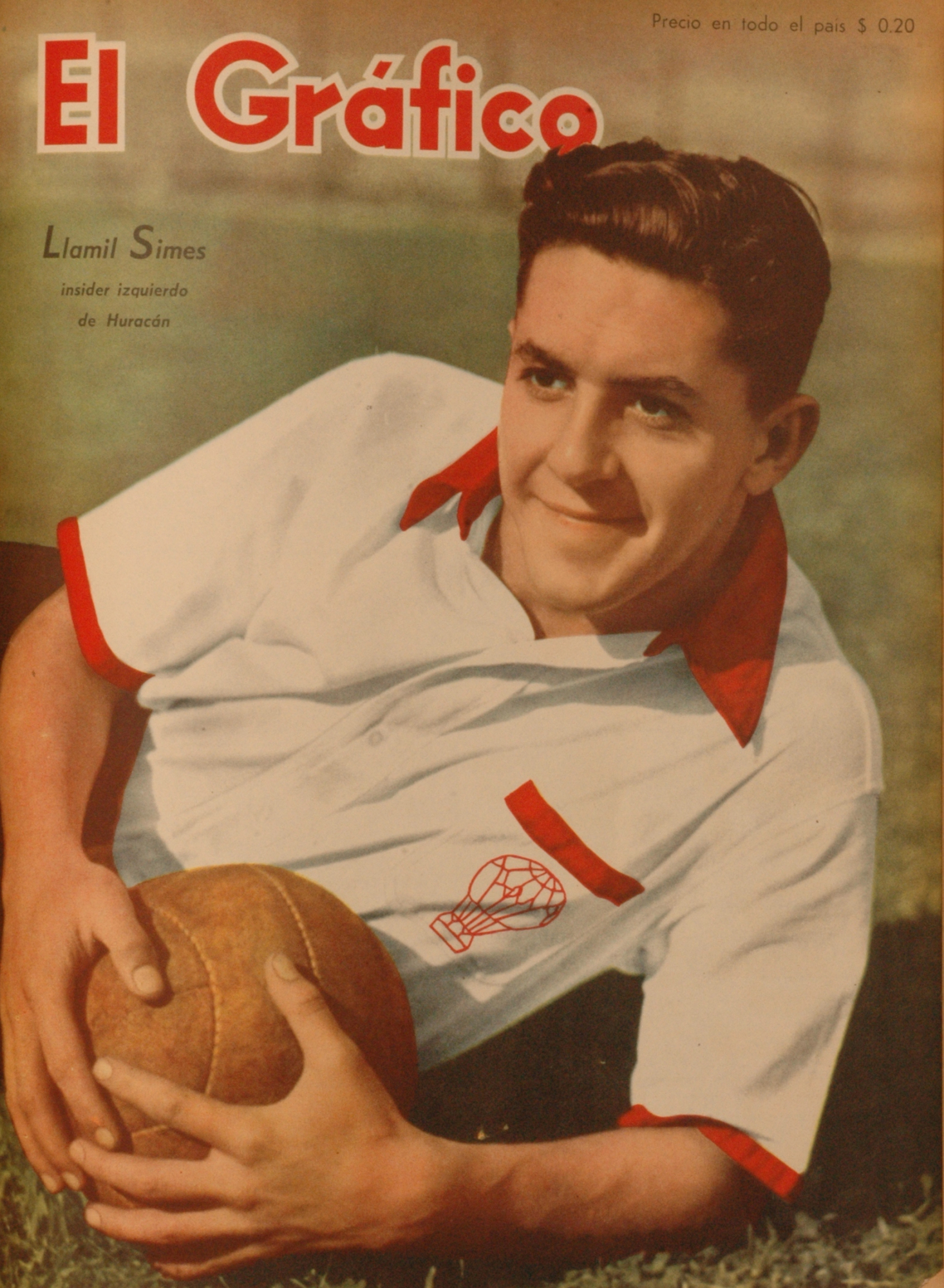
- Llamil Simes in 1945

Personal information
- Full name: Llamil Simes
- Date of birth: 20 January 1923
- Place of birth: Cordoba Province, Argentina
- Date of death: 20 February 1980
- Position: Striker

Senior career*
Years	Team	Apps	(Gls)
1943–1947	Huracán	93	(40)
1948–1955	Racing	179	(106)
1956	Tigre	8	(0)
- * Club domestic league appearances and goals

Llamil Simes (died 20 February 1980) was an Argentine football striker. Simes began his career with Club Atlético Huracán in 1943. He played for the club through 1947, then he joined Racing Club de Avellaneda from 1948 to 1955, before finishing his career with Club Atlético Tigre in 1956. He led the Primera Division in scoring during the 1949 season, tallying 26 goals for Racing, and is one of the league's all-time leading scorers.
