= Emilio Baldonedo =

Argentine footballer and manager

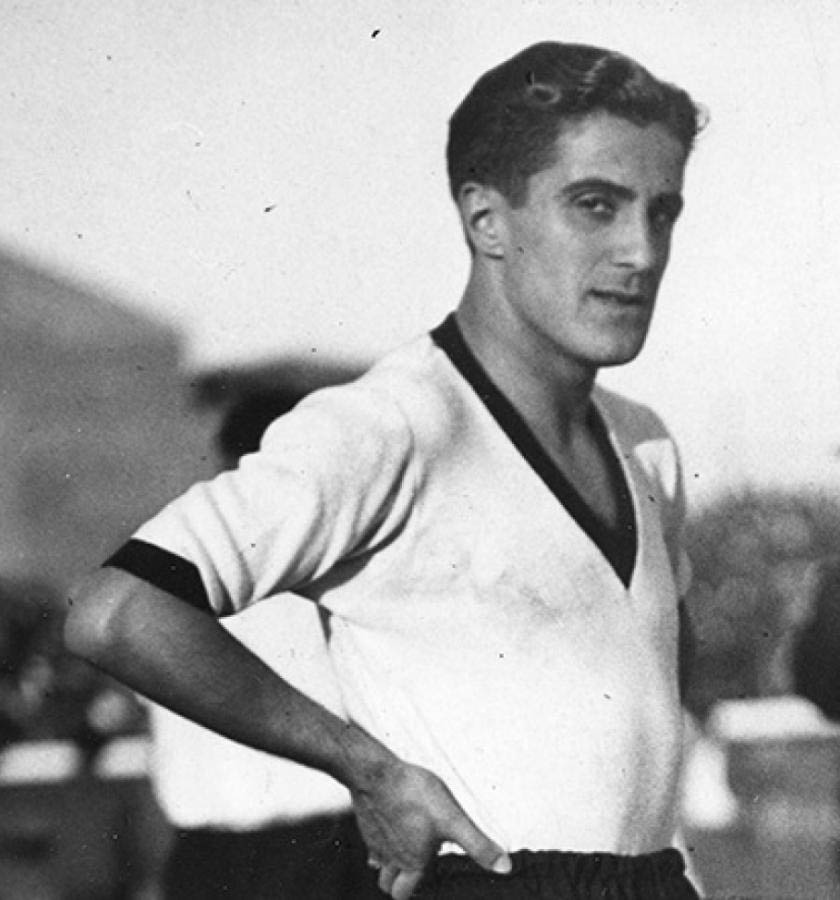

Personal information
- Date of birth: 23 June 1916
- Place of birth: Boedo, Buenos Aires, Argentina
- Date of death: 31 May 1999 (Aged 82)
- Position: Striker

Youth career
- Club Atlético Huracán

Senior career*
Years	Team	Apps	(Gls)
1935–1944	Huracán	257	(165)
1945	Newell's Old Boys	5	(0)
1945–1946	Monterrey	?	(?)
1946–1947	Puebla	?	(?)

International career
1940	Argentina	6	(7)

Managerial career
- Banfield
- Boca Juniors
- Chacarita Juniors
- Independiente
- Dock Sud
- Barracas Central
- * Club domestic league appearances and goals as of 29 October 2007

Emilio Baldonedo (23 June 1916 – 31 May 1999) was an Argentine footballer and football manager. He played the best part of his career for Club Atlético Huracán in Argentina and went on to become the manager of a number of teams in the Argentine Primera.

== Playing career ==
Baldonedo started his professional playing career with Huracán in 1935, he played for the club until 1944 scoring 165 goals in 257 league games. He is remembered as one of the most important strikers in the history of the club.

In 1940 he played six games for the Argentina national football team scoring seven goals.

Baldonedo joined Newell's Old Boys in 1945, but he only played 5 games for the club before moving to Mexico where he played for Monterrey and Puebla before retiring in 1947.

== Managerial career ==
After his retirement as a player Baldonedo became a football manager, directing several teams in the Primera, including; Club Atlético Banfield, Boca Juniors, Chacarita Juniors and Independiente. He also managed a number of lower league teams such as Dock Sud and Barracas Central.
