= Arturo Arrieta =

Argentine footballer (1911–??)

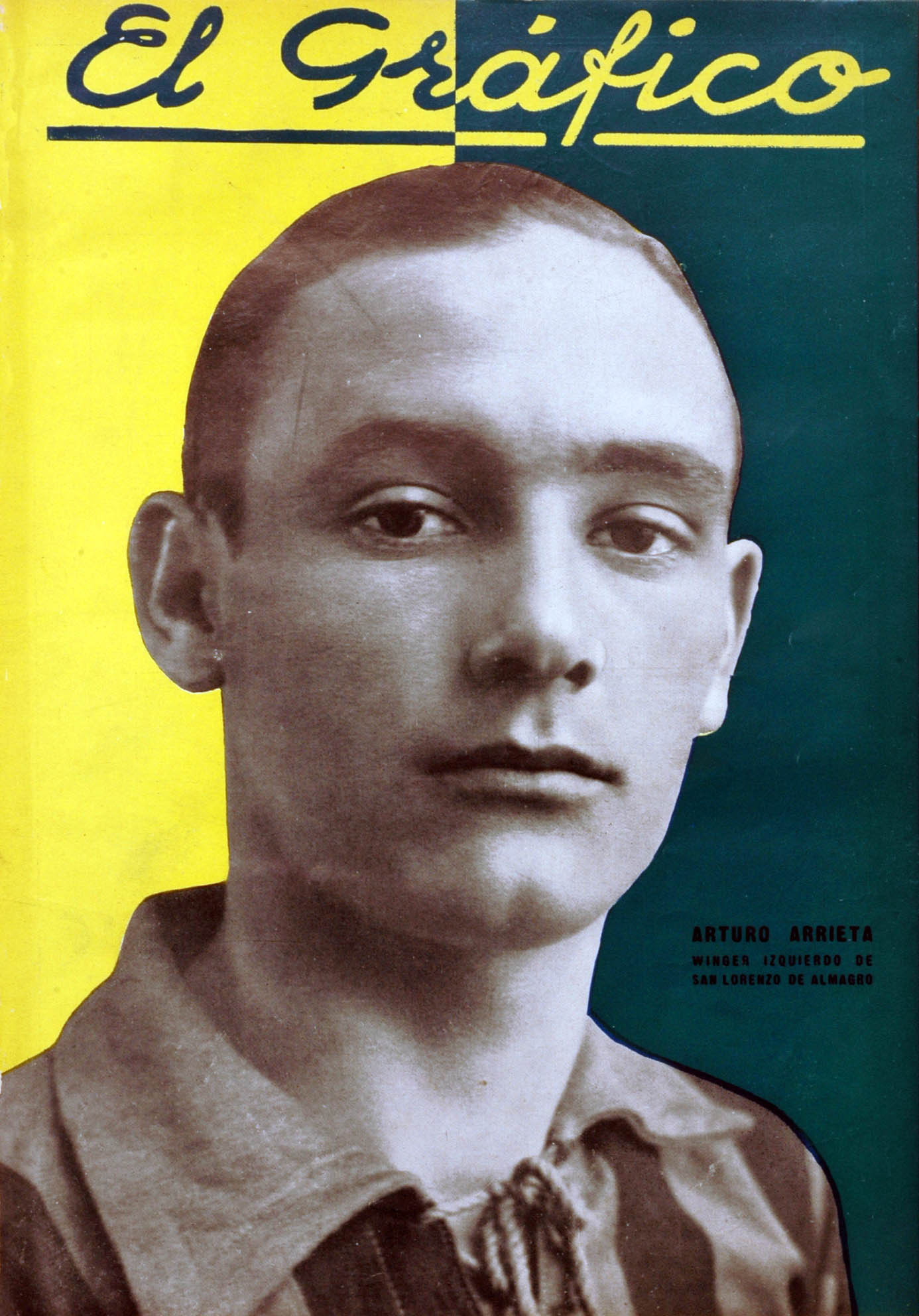
- Arturo Arrieta on the cover of El Grafico in 1931

Personal information
- Date of birth: 12 July 1911
- Position: Forward

International career
Years	Team	Apps	(Gls)
1933–1935	Argentina	5	(0)

Arturo Arrieta (born 12 July 1911, date of death unknown) was an Argentine footballer. He played in five matches for the Argentina national football team from 1933 to 1935. He was also part of Argentina's squad for the 1935 South American Championship.
