= Diego Corvalan =

Swiss footballer (born 2002)

Personal information
- Full name: Diego Miguel Corvalan Couceiro
- Date of birth: 17 February 2002 (age 24)
- Place of birth: Zürich, Switzerland
- Height: 1.78 m (5 ft 10 in)
- Position: Defender

Team information
- Current team: YF Juventus
- Number: 17

Youth career
- –2020: Zürich

Senior career*
Years	Team	Apps	(Gls)
2020	Zürich	1	(0)
2020–2022	Zürich U21	22	(0)
2022	YF Juventus	16	(0)
2022	Baden	2	(0)
2022–	YF Juventus	6	(0)

International career^{‡}
2016–2017	Switzerland U15	5	(0)
- * Club domestic league appearances and goals as of 1 October 2022 ‡ National team caps and goals as of 08:24, 20 July 2020 (UTC)

Diego Miguel Corvalan Couceiro (born 17 February 2002) is a Swiss professional footballer who plays as a right-back for YF Juventus.

== Career statistics ==
=== Club ===
As of 20 July 2020.

Club	Season	League			Cup		Continental		Other		Total	
Club	Season	Division	Apps	Goals	Apps	Goals	Apps	Goals	Apps	Goals	Apps	Goals
Zürich	2019–20	Swiss Super League	1	0	0	0	–		0	0	1	0
Career total			1	0	0	0	0	0	0	0	1	0
