= 1961 Argentine Primera División =

70th season of top-tier football league in Argentina

Primera División
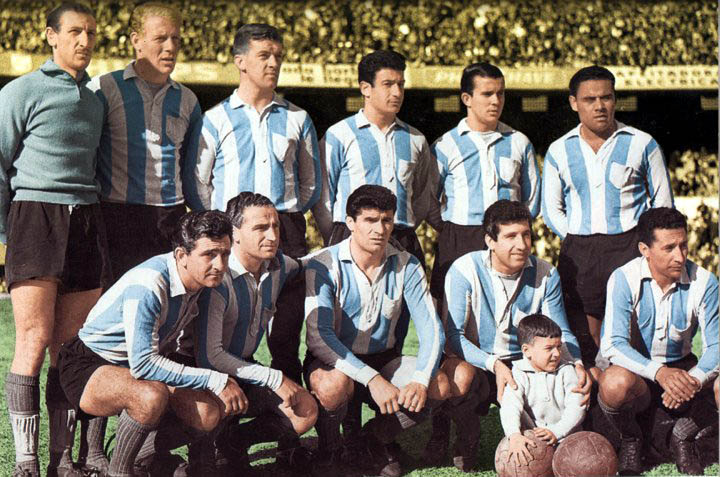
- Racing Club, champion
- Season: 1961
- Champions: Racing (14th title)
- Relegated: Lanús; Los Andes
- 1962 Copa Libertadores: Racing
- Top goalscorer: (Argentina) José Sanfilippo (26 goals)

The 1961 Argentine Primera División was the 70th season of top-flight football in Argentina. The season began on April 16 and ended on December 3.

Racing Club won its 14th championship while two teams were relegated to Primera B, Lanús and Los Andes.

== League standings ==
| Pos | Team | Pld | W | D | L | GF | GA | GD | Pts |
|---|---|---|---|---|---|---|---|---|---|
| 1 | Racing | 30 | 19 | 9 | 2 | 68 | 39 | +29 | 47 |
| 2 | San Lorenzo | 30 | 16 | 8 | 6 | 56 | 35 | +21 | 40 |
| 3 | River Plate | 30 | 15 | 8 | 7 | 53 | 30 | +23 | 38 |
| 4 | Atlanta | 30 | 13 | 11 | 6 | 49 | 34 | +15 | 37 |
| 5 | Boca Juniors | 30 | 14 | 7 | 9 | 57 | 33 | +24 | 35 |
| 6 | Independiente | 30 | 12 | 9 | 9 | 46 | 40 | +6 | 33 |
| 7 | Vélez Sársfield | 30 | 10 | 11 | 9 | 43 | 38 | +5 | 31 |
| 7 | Chacarita Juniors | 30 | 12 | 7 | 11 | 49 | 53 | −4 | 31 |
| 9 | Gimnasia y Esgrima (LP) | 30 | 12 | 4 | 14 | 56 | 53 | +3 | 28 |
| 10 | Huracán | 30 | 7 | 11 | 12 | 43 | 51 | −8 | 25 |
| 11 | Argentinos Juniors | 30 | 10 | 4 | 16 | 42 | 56 | −14 | 24 |
| 12 | Lanús | 30 | 7 | 10 | 13 | 36 | 59 | −23 | 24 |
| 13 | Rosario Central | 30 | 7 | 9 | 14 | 54 | 69 | −15 | 23 |
| 14 | Estudiantes (LP) | 30 | 4 | 14 | 12 | 29 | 47 | −18 | 22 |
| 15 | Ferro Carril Oeste | 30 | 8 | 5 | 17 | 38 | 55 | −17 | 21 |
| 15 | Los Andes | 30 | 10 | 1 | 19 | 38 | 65 | −27 | 21 |
