= José Sanfilippo =

Argentine footballer (1935–2026)

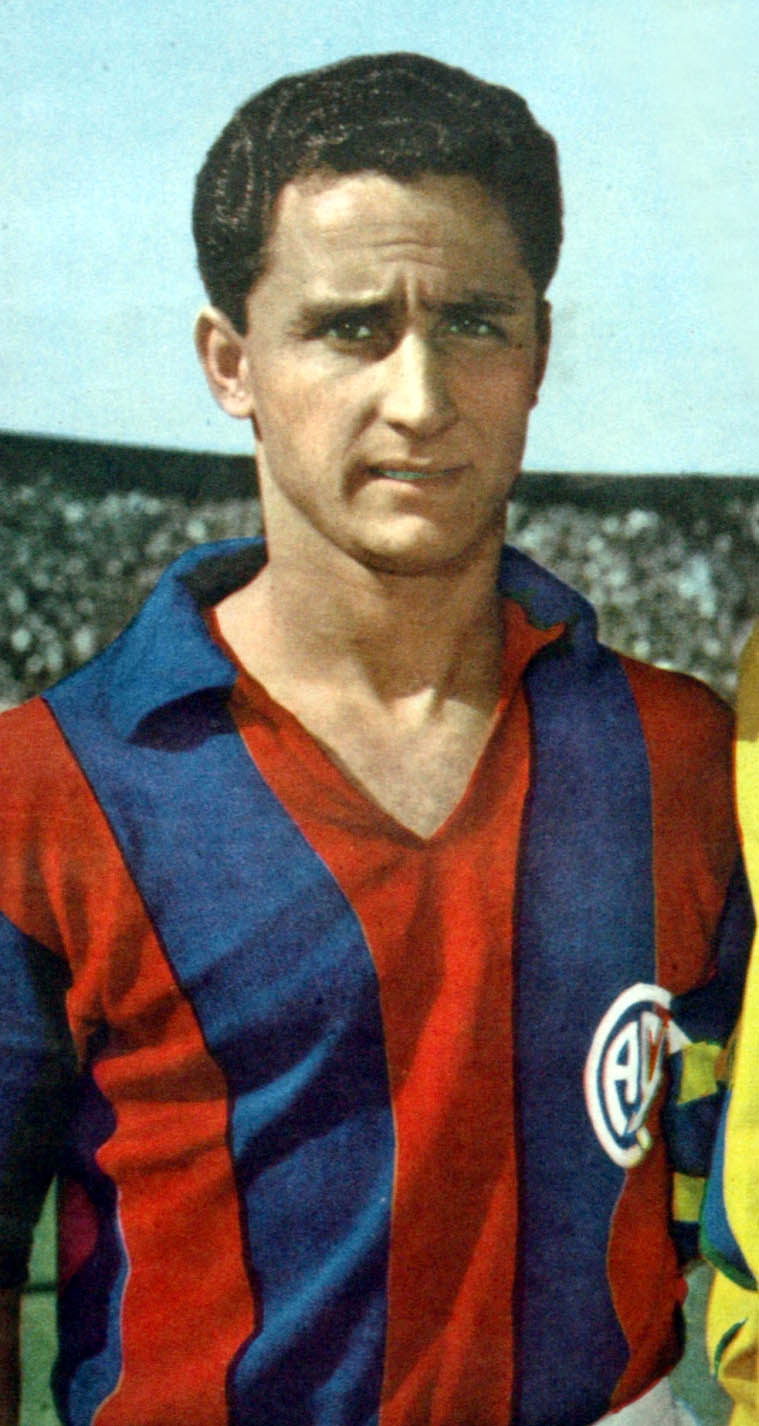
- Sanfilippo in 1962

Personal information
- Full name: José Francisco Sanfilippo
- Date of birth: 4 May 1935
- Place of birth: Buenos Aires, Argentina
- Date of death: 4 June 2026 (aged 91)
- Place of death: Buenos Aires, Argentina
- Position: Forward

Senior career*
Years	Team	Apps	(Gls)
1953–1962	San Lorenzo	(total) 260	(200)
1963–1964	Boca Juniors	20	(7)
1964–1965	Nacional	21	(25)
1966–1967	Banfield	50	(19)
1968	Bangu	14	(7)
1968–1971	Bahia	71	(48)
1972	San Lorenzo	(see above)	
1977	Banfield de San Pedro	3	
1978	San Miguel		

International career
1957–1962	Argentina	30	(21)

Managerial career
- 1971: Bahia
- 1973: Deportivo Español
- 1976: Vélez Sarsfield
- * Club domestic league appearances and goals

José Francisco "El Nene" Sanfilippo (4 May 1935 – 4 June 2026) was an Argentine footballer who played as a forward for San Lorenzo, Boca Juniors and Banfield in Argentina, Nacional in Uruguay, and Bangu and SC Bahia in Brazil.

== Club career ==
Sanfilippo was born in Buenos Aires on 4 May 1935.

Sanfilippo scored his first league goal for San Lorenzo on 21 November 1953 against Banfield, and went on to score 192 league goals for them up to 1962.

In 1963, Sanfilippo moved to Boca Juniors, although in 1964 he was dismissed from the club following a disciplinary incident in a match against his former club, San Lorenzo.

Sanfilippo joined Uruguayan side Nacional in 1964, after the first round of the Copa Libertadores. He scored against Colo Colo in the only Copa match he played for the club, before getting injured in a friendly match.

As of 2026, Sanfilippo was the ninth-highest-scoring player in Argentine football.

== International career ==
At international level, Sanfilippo played for the Argentina national team in the 1958 FIFA World Cup and the 1962 FIFA World Cup.

== Death ==
Sanfilippo died on 4 June 2026, at the age of 91.

== Honours ==
San Lorenzo

- Primera División: 1959, 1972 Metropolitano, 1972 Nacional

Boca Juniors

- Copa Libertadores runner-up: 1963

Nacional

- Torneo Cuadrangular: 1964

Bahia

- Campeonato Baiano: 1970, 1971

Argentina

- Pan American Games: 1955
- Copa América: 1957

Individual

- Argentine Primera División top scorer: 1958 (28 goals), 1959 (31 goals), 1960 (34 goals), 1961 (26 goals)
- Copa América top scorer: 1959
- Copa Libertadores top scorer: 1963 (7 goals)
