= Hugo Corbalán =

Argentine footballer

Personal information
- Full name: Hugo Rolando Corbalán
- Date of birth: November 8, 1970 (age 55)
- Place of birth: San Miguel de Tucumán, Argentina
- Height: 1.79 m (5 ft 10 1/2 in)
- Position: Defender

Senior career*
Years	Team	Apps	(Gls)
1989–1991	Atlético Tucumán		
1991–1998	Huracán	165	(7)
1998–1999	Racing Club	1	(0)
1999–2000	Independiente Rivadavia		
2000–2001	San Martín de Tucumán		
2002–2003	Atlético Tucumán		
2004	Sportivo Villa Dolores		
- * Club domestic league appearances and goals as of 23:22, 20 April 2009 (UTC)

Hugo Rolando Corbalán (born 8 November 1970 in San Miguel de Tucumán) is a retired Argentine football defender who played 165 league games for Huracán in the Primera División Argentina.

Corbalán started his playing career in 1989, playing in the Argentine 2nd division with local club Atlético Tucumán. In 1991, he signed with Huracán, where he went on to become a regular feature of the Racing team.

In 1998, Corbalán joined Racing Club de Avellaneda, but he only made one league appearance for the club before returning to the lower divisions of Argentine football.

In 1999, he joined Independiente Rivadavia of the Argentine 2nd division, he then played for two of his home town clubs, San Martín de Tucumán and then a second stint with Atlético Tucumán. His final club was Sportivo Villa Dolores of Catamarca in 2004.
