= 1946 Argentine Primera División =

55th season of top-tier football league in Argentina

Primera División
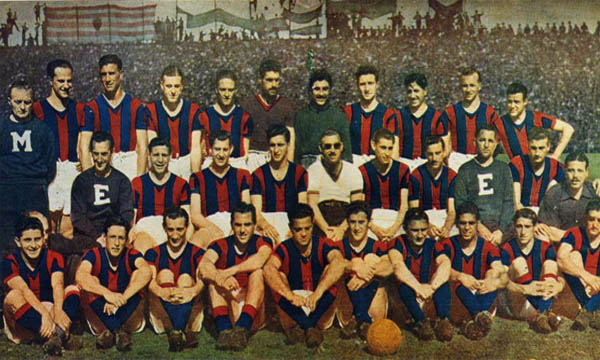
- San Lorenzo, champions
- Season: 1946
- Champions: San Lorenzo (6th title)
- Promoted: Tigre
- Relegated: Ferro Carril Oeste
- Top goalscorer: (Argentina) Mario Boyé (24 goals)

The 1946 Argentine Primera División was the 55th season of top-flight football in Argentina. The season began on April 21 and ended on December 8. Tigre returned to Primera while Ferro Carril Oeste was relegated.

San Lorenzo won its 6th league title.

== League standings ==
Pos	Team	Pld	W	D	L	GF	GA	GD	Pts
1	San Lorenzo	30	20	6	4	90	37	+53	46
2	Boca Juniors	30	19	4	7	68	38	+30	42
3	River Plate	30	17	7	6	59	34	+25	41
4	Racing	30	18	3	9	69	48	+21	39
5	Estudiantes (LP)	30	16	2	12	61	51	+10	34
5	Independiente	30	13	8	9	56	53	+3	34
7	Rosario Central	30	13	3	14	69	72	−3	29
8	Platense	30	10	8	12	48	47	+1	28
8	Huracán	30	12	4	14	57	68	−11	28
10	Newell's Old Boys	30	10	7	13	51	44	+7	27
11	Vélez Sársfield	30	11	4	15	52	62	−10	26
11	Lanús	30	8	10	12	55	70	−15	26
13	Chacarita Juniors	30	11	2	17	52	62	−10	24
14	Tigre	30	8	5	17	55	81	−26	21
15	Atlanta	30	7	6	17	51	82	−31	20
16	Ferro Carril Oeste	30	6	3	21	29	73	−44	15
