= Omar Larrosa =

Argentine footballer and coach

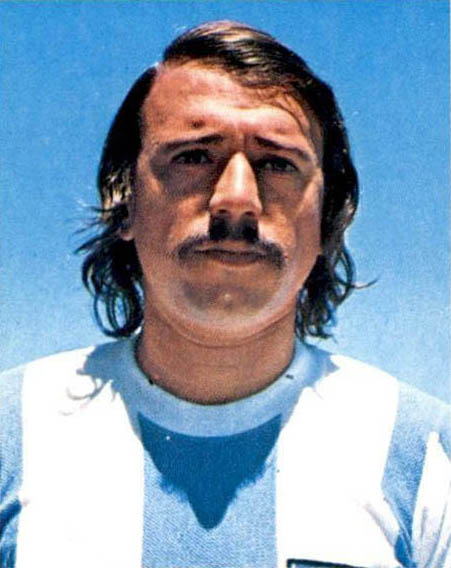
- Larrosa with Argentina in 1978

Personal information
- Full name: Omar Rubén Larrosa
- Date of birth: 18 November 1947 (age 78)
- Place of birth: Lanús, Argentina
- Height: 1.75 m (5 ft 9 in)
- Position: Midfielder

Senior career*
Years	Team	Apps	(Gls)
1967–1969	Boca Juniors	9	(1)
1969	Argentinos Juniors	31	(7)
1970-1971	Club Pachuca	6	(0)
1971-1972	CSD Comunicaciones	?	(?)
1972–1976	Huracán	228	(42)
1977–1980	Independiente	156	(23)
1980	Vélez Sársfield	13	(4)
1981	San Lorenzo	27	(4)

International career
1977–1978	Argentina	11	(0)

Managerial career
- 2004: Selangor
- 2010–: Boca Juniors (assistant coach)
Medal record
Representing Argentina
FIFA World Cup
Winner	1978 Argentina	Team
- * Club domestic league appearances and goals

Omar Ruben Larrosa (born 18 November 1947 in Lanús, Buenos Aires) is a retired Argentine footballer, who played as a midfielder, and the current assistant coach at Boca Juniors. He played for Argentina when the team won 1978 World Cup.

== Club career ==
Larrosa started his career at Boca Juniors in 1967, but he was soon allowed to leave by the club. He played for Argentinos Juniors for the 1969 season and although the team struggled, Larrosa played well and was invited to return to Boca. In the 1970 season Larrosa won his first trophy although he didn't actually play in the final of the Nacional against Rosario Central.

In the 1971 season, he traveled to Central America to join Guatemalan champions CSD Comunicaciones.

He played for Huracán between 1972 and 1976, this was a relatively successful era for the club, as well as winning the Metropolitano in 1973, the club finished as runners up in Metropolitano's 1975 and 1976 and reached the semi-finals of the Nacional in 1976.

In 1977 Larrosa was signed by Independiente for whom he played for between 1977 and 1980. These were his golden years as a player, he helped his team to win back to back Nacionals.

After Larrosa left Independiente in 1980 he had a short spell with Vélez Sársfield before joining San Lorenzo. The 1981 season progressed disastrously for San Lorenzo, ending with the club relegated from the Primera for the first time in their history, this catastrophe prompted Larrosa's retirement from football at the age of 34.

== International career ==
Larossa was included in the Argentina squad that won the 1978 FIFA World Cup on home soil.

In the World Cup final he came on as a 65th-minute substitute with Argentina 1–0 up against the Netherlands, but Argentina couldn't hold onto their lead and the Dutch equalised in the 82nd minute. The game went into extra time and Argentina scored twice to win the game 3–1.

== Player statistics ==
- Argentina national team (1977–1978): 11 matches, 0 goals
- Argentine Primera (1967–1981): 509 matches, 85 goals

== Honours ==
=== Club ===
Boca Juniors

- Nacional: 1970

Comunicaciones F.C.

- Liga Nacional de Fútbol de Guatemala: 1971

Huracán

- Metropolitano: 1973

Independiente

- Nacional: 1977, 1978

=== International ===
Argentina

- FIFA World Cup: 1978
