= 1970 Copa Argentina final =

- Event: 1970 Copa Argentina
| San Lorenzo | Vélez Sársfield |
| – | – |
- (no champion crowned)

First leg
| San Lorenzo | Vélez Sársfield |
| 2 | 2 |
- Date: 3 March 1971
- Venue: Estadio de Atlanta, Buenos Aires
- Referee: Juan F. Álvarez

Second leg
| Vélez Sársfield | San Lorenzo |
| – | – |
- Date: (Not played)

The 1970 Copa Argentina final was the final two-legged tie that decided the champion of the 1970 Copa Argentina. The finals were contested in two-legged home-and-away format between San Lorenzo and Vélez Sársfield. The first leg was played in Estadio de Atlanta in Buenos Aires, ending in a 2–2 tie.

The second leg was never played so the tournament was unfinished and neither San Lorenzo nor Velez Sarsfield were declared champion. The champion was supposed to qualify to Copa Ganadores de Copa but this never happened.

== Qualified teams ==
| Team | Previous finals app. |
|---|---|
| San Lorenzo | None |
| Vélez Sársfield | None |

== Venue ==
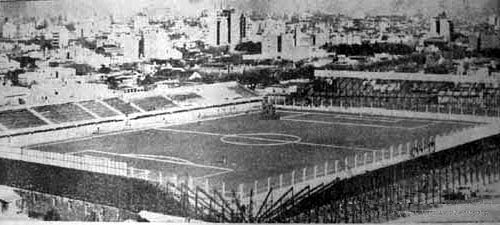
Estadio de Atlanta, venue of the series

The series here held in Estadio Don León Kolbowski, home venue of Club Atlético Atlanta. Inaugurated on June 5, 1960, it had a capacity of 34,000 spectators In 1963, a lighting system was placed, then replaced by a more modern one, of six towers.

The stadium was re-opened after 3 years of both an AFA suspension and renovations, on 29 March 2009, after the Buenos Aires Justice department had ordered the stadium to close, due to an altercation between Atlanta and All Boys supporters in a match during 2006. A condition was made that saw the club replace the old wooden terracing before being allowed back. Atlanta had played their home games at various stadiums, including Estadio Ciudad de Vicente López (home of Club Atlético Platense) and Ferro Carril Oeste Stadium, during this lapse.

== Road to the final ==
| San Lorenzo | | | | | Vélez Sársfield | | | |
|---|---|---|---|---|---|---|---|---|
| Opponent | Agg. | 1st leg | 2nd leg | Round | Opponent | Agg. | 1st leg | 2nd leg |
| Unión (SF) | 3–2 | 2–2 (A) | 1–0 (H) | First round | Argentinos del Norte | 2–2 (4–3 p) (Note: Both matches were played in Tucumán Province.) | 0–1 (A) | 2–1 (A) |
| Colón | 4–1 | 0–0 (A) | 4–1 (H) | Second round | Instituto (C) | 2–0 (Note: Both matches were played in Córdoba Province.) | 0–0 (A) | 2–0 (A) |
| Rosario Central | 4–2 | 1–2 (A) | 3–0 (H) | Quarterfinals | Chacarita Juniors | 3–1 | 1–0 (A) | 2–1 (H) |
| All Boys (SR) [es] | 4–2 | 1–1 (A) | 3–1 (H) | Semifinals | Racing | 6–4 (Note: Both matches were played at Estadio de Atlanta.) | 3–2 (N) | 3–2 (N) |

== Match details ==
=== First leg ===
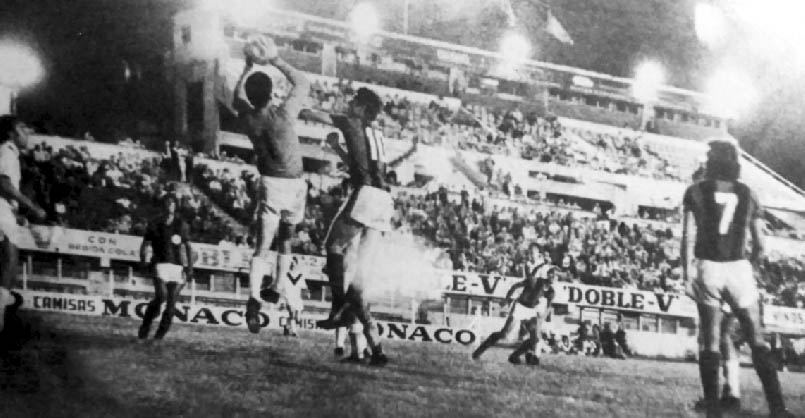
Some moments of the match held in Estadio de Atlanta
1970 Copa Argentina final
3 March 1971
First leg

| San Lorenzo | 2–2 | Vélez Sársfield |
|---|---|---|
| Ayala 1'; Gónzalez 6' | Report | Benitto 50'; Mecca 52' |

Estadio de Atlanta, Buenos Aires
Referee: Juan Álvarez

| San Lorenzo | Vélez Sarsfield |

| GK | (Argentina) Luis Kadijevich |
| DF | (Uruguay) Sergio Villar |
| DF | (Argentina) Ricardo Rezza |
| DF | (Argentina) Ramon Heredia |
| DF | (Argentina) Antonio Rosl |
| MF | (Argentina) Roberto Telch |
| MF | (Argentina) Miguel Ángel Tojo |
| MF | (Argentina) Carlos Veglio |
| FW | (Argentina) Pedro Alexis Gónzalez |
| FW | (Argentina) Rubén Ayala |
| FW | (Argentina) Rodolfo Fischer |
Manager:
(Argentina) Rogelio Domínguez

| GK | (Argentina) Carlos Caballero |
| DF | (Argentina) Heriberto Correa |
| DF | (Argentina) Miguel Ferrari |
| DF | (Argentina) Eduardo Zóttola |
| DF | (Argentina) Roberto Avanzi |
| MF | (Argentina) Jorge Rodríguez |
| MF | (Argentina) Miguel Reguera |
| MF | (Argentina) Héctor Lamberti |
| FW | (Argentina) Miguel Ángel Cotton |
| FW | (Argentina) Miguel Ángel Benitto |
| FW | (Argentina) Adolfo Mecca |
Manager:
(Argentina) Alfredo Bermúdez

=== Second leg ===
Second leg

| San Lorenzo | (cancelled) | Vélez Sársfield |

As the second leg was never played, no team was awarded the title.
