= 1968 Argentine Primera División =

77th season of top-tier football league in Argentina

Primera División
- Season: 1968
- Dates: 1 March – 29 December
- Champions: San Lorenzo (Metropolitano); Vélez Sársfield (Nacional)
- 1969 Copa Libertadores: Vélez Sarsfield; River Plate

The 1968 Primera División season was the 77th season of top-flight football in Argentina, continuing with the Metropolitano and Nacional championships format. Tigre and Los Andes (1st and 2nd of "Torneo Reclasificatorio") promoted from Primera B.

San Lorenzo (8th league title) and Vélez Sársfield (1st title) won the Metropolitano and Nacional respectively. On the other hand, Ferro Carril Oeste and Tigre were relegated after playing a "Reclasificatorio" tournament.

== Campeonato Metropolitano ==
Metropolitano
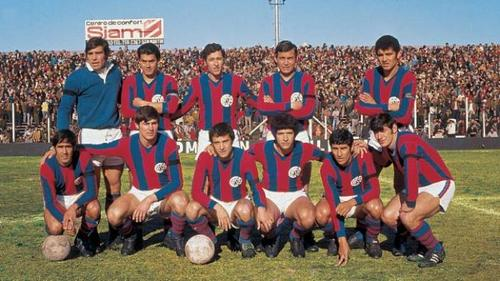
- San Lorenzo, Metropolitano champions
- Season: 1968
- Dates: 1 March – 7 December
- Champions: San Lorenzo (8th title)
- Promoted: Los Andes; Tigre
- Relegated: Ferro Carril Oeste; Tigre
- Top goalscorer: (Argentina) Alfredo Oberti (13)

=== Group A ===
Pos	Team	Pld	W	D	L	GF	GA	GD	Pts	Qualification or relegation
1	San Lorenzo	22	14	8	0	44	10	+34	36	to Semifinals
2	Estudiantes (LP)	22	9	6	7	39	27	+12	24	to Semifinals
2	Lanús	22	9	6	7	20	23	−3	24	
4	Racing	22	5	13	4	28	29	−1	23	
4	Boca Juniors	22	5	13	4	15	17	−2	23	
6	Colón	22	7	7	8	26	25	+1	21	
7	Newell's Old Boys	22	6	8	8	26	22	+4	20	
7	Banfield	22	6	8	8	23	27	−4	20	
9	Atlanta	22	5	8	9	20	25	−5	18	to Torneo Reclasificatorio
10	Ferro Carril Oeste	22	4	9	9	20	38	−18	17	to Torneo Reclasificatorio
11	Platense	22	2	11	9	15	27	−12	15	to Torneo Reclasificatorio

=== Group B ===
Pos	Team	Pld	W	D	L	GF	GA	GD	Pts	Qualification or relegation
1	Vélez Sársfield	22	12	8	2	40	20	+20	32	to Semifinals
2	River Plate	22	12	7	3	31	16	+15	31	to Semifinals
3	Rosario Central	22	10	7	5	29	17	+12	27	
4	Huracán	22	10	6	6	29	18	+11	26	
5	Independiente	22	10	5	7	34	19	+15	25	
6	Los Andes	22	8	7	7	30	28	+2	23	
6	Chacarita Juniors	22	10	3	9	28	29	−1	23	
8	Argentinos Juniors	22	6	7	9	23	29	−6	19	
9	Quilmes	22	6	6	10	27	34	−7	18	to Torneo Reclasificatorio
10	Gimnasia y Esgrima (LP)	22	3	5	14	20	52	−32	11	to Torneo Reclasificatorio
11	Tigre	22	2	4	16	12	47	−35	8	to Torneo Reclasificatorio

=== Semifinals ===
Played under a single-match format in neutral venue:

* Winner of the series

Date	Team 1	Team 2	Res.	Venue	City
31 Jul	San Lorenzo	River Plate	3–1	Racing Stadium	Avellaneda
1 Aug	Estudiantes LP	Vélez Sársfield	1–0	Racing Stadium	Avellaneda

=== Final ===
Date	Team 1	Team 2	Res.	Venue	City
6 July	San Lorenzo	Estudiantes (LP)	2–1	River Plate Stadium	Buenos Aires

==== Match details ====
1968 Campeonato Metropolitano Final
4 August 1968

San Lorenzo	2–1 (a.e.t.)	Estudiantes (LP)
Veglio 67'; Fischer 100'	Report	Verón 47'

River Plate Stadium, Buenos Aires
Attendance: 47,300
Referee: Miguel Comesaña

San Lorenzo	Estudiantes (LP)

GK	1	(Argentina) Carlos Buttice
RB	2	(Argentina) Oscar Calics
LB	3	(Argentina) Antonio Rosl
RH	4	(Argentina) Sergio Villar
CH	5	(Argentina) Victorio Cocco
LH	6	(Argentina) Rafael Albrecht
RW	7	(Argentina) Pedro A. González
IF	8	(Argentina) Alberto Rendo
CF	9	(Argentina) Rodolfo Fischer
IF	10	(Argentina) Roberto Telch
LW	11	(Argentina) Carlos Veglio
Manager:
(Brazil) Elba de Pádua Lima (Tim)

GK	1	(Argentina) Alberto Poletti
LB	2	(Argentina) Néstor Togneri
RB	3	(Argentina) José H. Medina
RH	4	(Argentina) Oscar Malbernat
CH	5	(Argentina) Raúl Madero
LH	6	(Argentina) Carlos Pachamé
RW	7	(Argentina) Juan Echecopar
IF	8	(Argentina) Carlos Bilardo
CF	9	(Argentina) Marcos Conigliaro
IF	10	(Argentina) Eduardo Flores
LW	11	(Argentina) Juan Ramón Verón
Manager:
(Argentina) Osvaldo Zubeldía

=== Reclasificatorio Tournament ===
Teams that finished 9th, 10th and 11th in both zones of Metropolitano qualified to "Torneo Reclasificación", also contested by four teams from Primera B. The ten clubs played in a double round-robin system. The first 6 teams would remain/promote to Primera División while the last four would remain/be relegated to Primera B.

The tournament ran from August 2 to December 7, and was won (not awarded as an official title) by Quilmes, with Ferro Carril Oeste and Tigre being relegated to the second division.

Pos	Team	Pld	W	D	L	GF	GA	GD	Pts
1	Quilmes	18	7	9	2	25	11	+14	23
2	Atlanta	18	7	8	3	18	12	+6	22
3	Gimnasia y Esgrima (LP)	18	8	5	5	23	16	+7	21
4	Platense	18	6	8	4	24	21	+3	20
4	Unión	18	5	10	3	19	21	−2	20
6	Deportivo Morón	18	5	9	4	18	14	+4	19
7	Ferro Carril Oeste	18	4	9	5	17	18	−1	17
8	Nueva Chicago	18	4	6	8	15	23	−8	14
9	Almagro	18	3	6	9	22	33	−11	12
9	Tigre	18	1	10	7	13	25	−12	12

=== Promocional Tournament ===
Teams placed 7th and 8th in each zone of Campeonato Metropolitano, plus the four teams that had lost finals of Torneo Regional contested the "Torneo Promocional". It ran from 26 August to 30 November and was won by Banfield, with no official title awarded.

Pos	Team	Pld	W	D	L	GF	GA	GD	Pts
1	Banfield	14	10	3	1	33	10	+23	23
2	Newell's Old Boys	14	10	1	3	31	8	+23	21
3	San Martín (SJ)	14	8	3	3	24	20	+4	19
4	Chacarita Juniors	14	7	3	4	26	14	+12	17
5	Argentinos Juniors	14	4	6	4	14	18	−4	14
6	Central Córdoba (SdE)	14	3	3	8	13	26	−13	9
7	Huracán	14	1	3	10	8	30	−22	5
8	San Lorenzo (MdP)	14	1	2	11	10	33	−23	4

=== Top scorers ===
Rank.	Player	Team	Goals
1	(Argentina) Alfredo Obberti	Los Andes	13
2	(Argentina) Rodolfo Fischer	San Lorenzo	12
3	(Argentina) Eduardo Flores	Estudiantes LP	11
3	(Argentina) Jorge O. Pérez	Vélez Sarsfield	11
3	(Argentina) Héctor Yazalde	Independiente	11

== Campeonato Nacional ==
=== Standings ===
Nacional
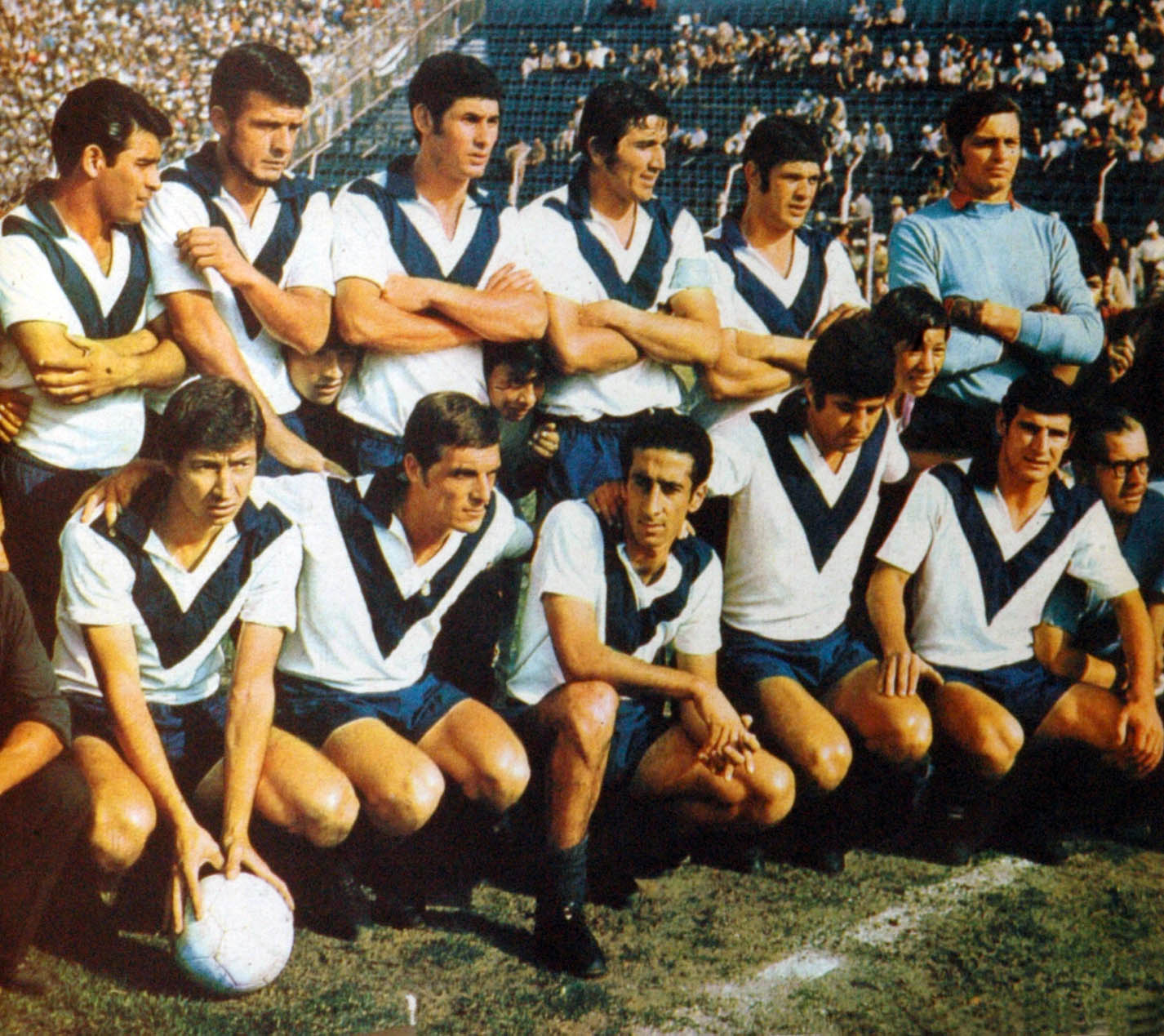
- Vélez Sársfield, Nacional champions
- Season: 1968
- Dates: 6 September – 29 December
- Champions: Vélez Sársfield (1st title)
- 1969 Copa Libertadores: Vélez Sársfield; River Plate
- Top goalscorer: (Argentina) Omar Wehbe (13)

Pos	Team	Pld	W	D	L	GF	GA	GD	Pts	Qualification
1	Vélez Sársfield	15	10	2	3	39	14	+25	22	Playoffs to define a champion
1	River Plate	15	9	4	2	35	15	+20	22	Playoffs to define a champion
1	Racing	15	8	6	1	29	15	+14	22	Playoffs to define a champion
4	Rosario Central	15	9	3	3	28	11	+17	21	
4	Boca Juniors	15	8	5	2	25	7	+18	21	
6	Colón	15	8	3	4	26	19	+7	19	
7	San Lorenzo	15	6	6	3	24	20	+4	18	
8	Los Andes	15	6	5	4	22	15	+7	17	
9	Huracán	15	5	3	7	23	22	+1	13	
9	Belgrano	15	3	7	5	20	27	−7	13	
11	Independiente	15	4	4	7	26	25	+1	12	
12	Lanús	15	2	7	6	15	22	−7	11	
13	Independiente Rivadavia	15	1	7	7	8	25	−17	9	
14	Estudiantes (LP)	15	3	1	11	12	26	−14	7	
14	San Martín (T)	15	2	3	10	11	34	−23	7	
16	Huracán (IW)	15	2	2	11	11	57	−46	6	

=== First place playoffs ===
As Vélez Sársfield, River Plate, and Racing finished equaled on points, they played a round-robin tournament to define a champion. All the matches were held in San Lorenzo Stadium. Teams finished 1st and 2nd qualified for the 1969 Copa Libertadores.

==== Results ====
- 1st. Match [Dec 19]: River Plate 2–0 Racing
- 2nd. Match [Dec 22]: River Plate 1–1 Vélez Sarsfield
- 3rd. Match [Dec 29]: Racing 2–4 Vélez Sarsfield

==== Final table ====
Pos	Team	Pld	W	D	L	GF	GA	GD	Pts	Qualification
1	Vélez Sársfield	2	1	1	0	5	3	+2	3	Qualified to 1969 Copa Libertadores
2	River Plate	2	1	1	0	3	1	+2	3	Qualified to 1969 Copa Libertadores
3	Racing	2	0	0	2	2	6	−4	0	

=== Top scorers ===
Rank.	Player	Team	Goals
1	(Argentina) Omar Wehbe	Vélez Sarsfield	13
2	(Brazil) Araquem de Melo	Huracán	10
2	(Argentina) Alfredo Obberti	Los Andes	10
3	(Argentina) Roberto Salomone	Racing	9
