= Rubén Glaria =

Argentine footballer, football manager, and politician

Rubén Glaría
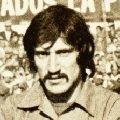

Personal information
- Full name: Rubén Oscar Glaría
- Date of birth: 10 March 1948 (age 78)
- Place of birth: Argentina
- Height: 1.69 m (5 ft 7 in)
- Position: Left back

Senior career*
Years	Team	Apps	(Gls)
1968–1975	San Lorenzo		
1975–1979	Racing Club		

International career
1974	Argentina		
- * Club domestic league appearances and goals

Rubén Oscar Glaría (born 10 March 1948) is a former Argentine football player and manager, and a current politician. He played as a defender for San Lorenzo and Racing Club and represented the Argentina national football team at the 1974 World Cup.

Glaria made his professional debut for San Lorenzo in 1968, during his time with the club he participated in four championship winning campaigns.

In 1974, Glaria was part of the Argentina squad for the World Cup and in 1975 he joined Racing Club.

After his retirement as a player Glaria became a football manager, he worked at a number of clubs in Argentina, including San Miguel, Sportivo Italiano, Chaco For Ever, Villa Dálmine and Atlanta.

Glaria became particularly involved in politics in the 1980s, serving on the campaign to elect Carlos Menem as President of Argentina. He was provincial sports minister for Buenos Aires Province From 1995 he served as the Justicialist Party mayor of José Clemente Paz, until 1999 when he was displaced by a rival group of Justicialists. Glaria lost the internal selection of the PJ and launched his own faction, the Peronist Front. The subsequent election spilled over into a notable violent episode between the factions, which saw gunshots and stabbings, with eight wounded. In 2005, he was a candidate for national senator for the Buenos Aires New Party.

== Honours ==
San Lorenzo

- Argentine Primera División: 1968 Metropolitano, 1972 Metropolitano, 1972 Nacional, 1974 Nacional
