= Héctor Scotta =

Argentine footballer

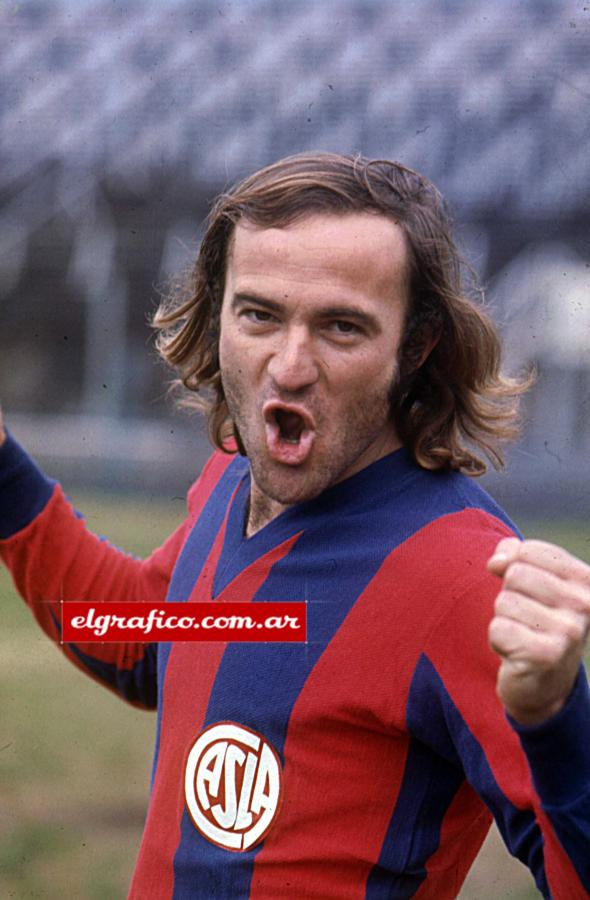
- Scotta in San Lorenzo colors in 1974

Personal information
- Full name: Héctor Horacio Leonel Scotta Guigo
- Date of birth: 27 September 1950 (age 76)
- Place of birth: San Justo, Santa Fe, Argentina
- Position: Striker

Senior career*
Years	Team	Apps	(Gls)
1970	Unión de Santa Fe	23	(9)
1971–1976	San Lorenzo		(129)
1976	Grêmio		(8)
1976–1980	Sevilla	101	(53)
1980	Ferro Carril Oeste	10	(1)
1981	San Lorenzo		
1982	Boca Juniors	12	(2)
1983	Nueva Chicago		
1984–1985	All Boys		
1986	Deportivo Armenio		

International career
	Argentina	6	(4)
- * Club domestic league appearances and goals as of January 2007

Héctor Horacio Leonel Scotta Guigo (born 27 September 1950) is an Argentine retired football striker. He was born in the city of San Justo in the Santa Fe Province of Argentina. Scotta is most famous for his feat of scoring 60 goals in 1975.

== Career ==
Scotta started his career in 1970 with Unión de Santa Fe but after only one season he moved to Club Atlético San Lorenzo de Almagro where he was part of the Nacional winning team of 1974. In 1975 Scotta was the topscorer of the Nacional championship with 28 goals and Metropolitano champion with 32 goals, this made him the topscorer in South America and in world football for 1975. Scotta was awarded the Olimpia de Plata as the Argentine sports writer's footballer of the year. During 1975, Scotta broke Arsenio Erico's single-season Argentine Primera División goal-scoring record with 48 goals.

Scotta's goalscoring achievements of 1975 attracted the attention of a number of foreign clubs, the team that managed to sign him was Grêmio in Brazil, where he helped them to win the Campeonato Gaúcho in 1977.

In 1979 Scotta returned to San Lorenzo, he then had a season with Ferro Carril Oeste in 1980, another with San Lorenzo in 1981 and a final season at the top level of Argentine football with Boca Juniors. He also played for Sevilla FC.

Scotta later had spells with 2nd division outfits Nueva Chicago, All Boys and Deportivo Armenio.

== Personal life ==
Scotta's grandson Valentino Fattore is also a professional footballer who has played for Sevilla and Aris.

== Honours ==
San Lorenzo

- Argentine Primera División: 1972 Metropolitano, 1972 Nacional, 1974 Nacional

Individual

- Argentine Primera División Top scorer: Metropolitano 1975 (32 goals), Nacional 1975 (28 goals)
- Seasonwise World Top Scorer: 1975
- Top scorer in South America: 1975 (60 goals)
- Argentine Footballer of the Year: 1975
