= Carlos Veglio =

Argentine footballer

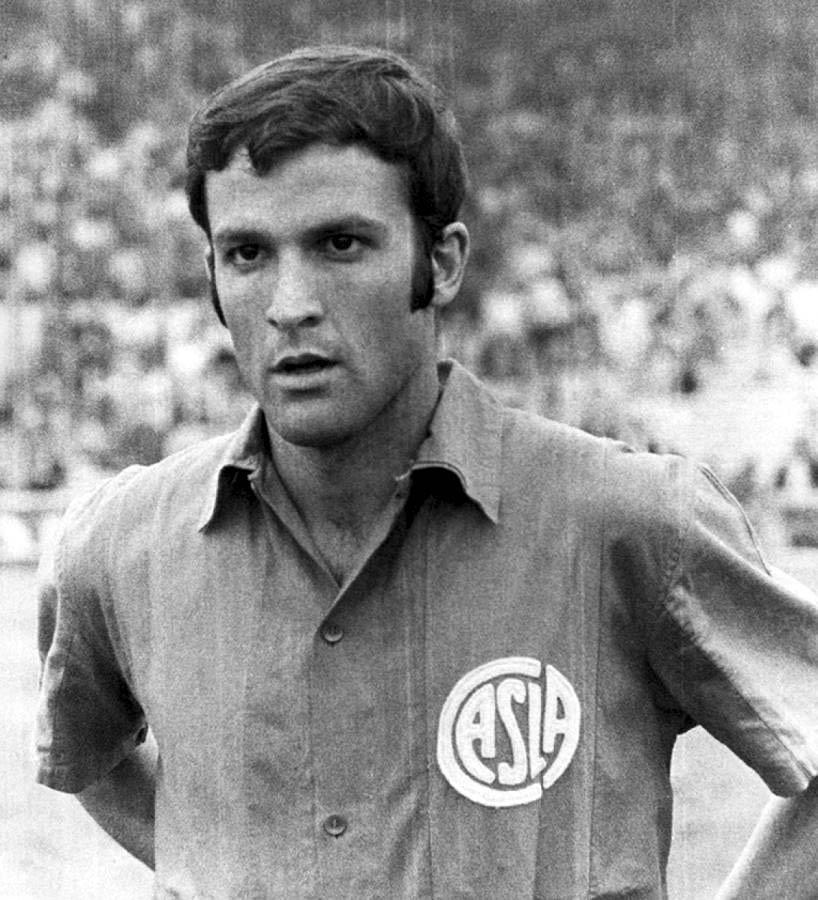
- Veglio in the beginning of his career at San Lorenzo de Almagro

Personal information
- Full name: Carlos José Veglio
- Date of birth: August 27, 1946 (age 80)
- Place of birth: Buenos Aires, Argentina
- Position: Striker

Senior career*
Years	Team	Apps	(Gls)
1964–1967	Deportivo Español	32	(4)
1968–1975	San Lorenzo	202	(59)
1976–1978	Boca Juniors	68	(12)
1979	Universidad	29	(11)
1980	Boca Juniors	27	(2)
1981	León	?	(?)
1981	Cerro Porteño	?	(?)
1982	Gimnasia de Jujuy	8	(1)

International career
1968–1970	Argentina	9	(0)
- * Club domestic league appearances and goals as of 22 October 2007

Carlos José Veglio (born 27 August 1946, in Buenos Aires) is a former Argentine football striker. He won a number of major titles with San Lorenzo and Boca Juniors and represented the Argentina national football team.

== Playing career ==
=== Early years ===
Veglio started his professional career in 1964 in the Argentine 2nd division with Deportivo Español. In 1966, the club won promotion to the Primera División Argentina he played in the Primera during the 1967 season.

=== San Lorenzo ===
In 1968, Veglio won his first title with San Lorenzo in his first year on the team. He helped the club to win the Metropolitano without losing a single game, making them the first unbeaten champions in the professional era of Argentine football.

In 1972 Veglio was part of the San Lorenzo team that won both of the Argentine league titles, this time they completed the Nacional championship without losing a game.

Veglio won his fourth title with San Lorenzo in 1974, the club won the Nacional championship. Veglio is one of only five players to have won four league championships with San Lorenzo, the others being Sergio Villar, Victorio Cocco, Roberto Telch and Agustín Irusta.

=== Boca Juniors ===
In 1976, Veglio joined Boca Juniors where he went on to win five titles in his time at the club. Boca won the 1976 Metropolitano and the 1976 Nacional, they won the Copa Libertadores in 1977 and 1978, and the Copa Intercontinental in 1977. In 1979, Veglio was loaned to Universidad in Venezuela but he returned to Boca in 1980.

=== Later years ===
In 1981, Veglio had a spell in Mexico with Club León and then played in Paraguay with Cerro Porteño. In 1982, he returned to Argentina and finished his career with Gimnasia y Esgrima de Jujuy.

== Titles as player ==
San Lorenzo

- Primera División (4): 1968 Metropolitano, 1972 Metropolitano, 1972 Nacional, 1974 Nacional

Boca Juniors

- Primera División (2): 1976 Metropolitano, 1976 Nacional
- Copa Libertadores (2): 1977, 1978
- Intercontinental Cup (1): 1977

== Coaching career ==
After retiring as a player, Veglio turned his hand to coaching, he has worked on the backroom staff at Boca Juniors and at Atlético Madrid, and was the field assistant to Carlos Bianchi.
