= Oscar Ortiz (footballer) =

Argentine footballer

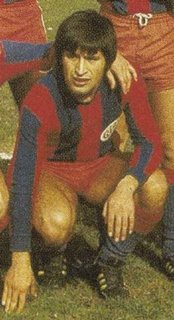
- Ortiz at San Lorenzo de Almagro

Personal information
- Full name: Oscar Alberto Ortiz
- Date of birth: 8 April 1953 (age 73)
- Place of birth: Chacabuco, Argentina
- Height: 1.70 m (5 ft 7 in)
- Position: Winger

Senior career*
Years	Team	Apps	(Gls)
1971–1976	San Lorenzo	128	(20)
1976	Grêmio	40	(1)
1977–1981	River Plate	101	(10)
1981–1982	Huracán	25	(3)
1982–1983	Independiente	30	(0)

International career
1975–1979	Argentina	23	(3)
Medal record
Representing Argentina
FIFA World Cup
Winner	1978 Argentina	Team
- * Club domestic league appearances and goals

Oscar Alberto Ortiz (born 8 April 1953 in Chacabuco, Buenos Aires) is a former Argentine professional footballer who played as a winger. He was part of the team who won the 1978 FIFA World Cup.

== Career ==
The most notable achievement of his footballing career was being part of the Argentina team that won the World Cup 1978.

Ortiz began his career at San Lorenzo and made his debut in 1971 against Newell's Old Boys in a 2–1 victory. as a young player he was part of the squad that won 3 league titles (M1972, N1972 and N1974).

In 1976 San Lorenzo sold him to Brazilian club Grêmio. He said he was injured during most of his run there and he returned to Argentina to play for River Plate.

His time at River Plate was his most successful, in terms of trophies. his first trophy at the club was the Metropolitano championship in 1977.

His fine form saw him called up to play for Argentina in World Cup 1978; he was a member of the team that defeated the Netherlands, 3–1, in the final (held in River's home stadium Estadio Monumental) to claim Argentina's first World Cup.

Back at River Ortiz helped River to win three league titles in a row (M1979, N1979 and M1980), the second time in their history that they had achieved this feat.

In 1981 River sold Ortiz to Club Atlético Huracán; his time there was unremarkable and he was soon sold on to Independiente.

The last title he won came at Independiente as part of the triumphant 1983 Motropolitano team; he retired from football shortly afterwards.

== Playing style ==
He said his style was not to score goals but to unbalance defenses, get to the bottom and send the center to the best receiver.

== Player statistics ==
- Argentina (1975–1979): Games 23 Goals 3
- Argentine Primera (1971–1976 / 1977–1983): Games 317 Goals 32

== Honours ==
=== Club ===
San Lorenzo

- Metropolitano: 1972
- Nacional: 1972, 1974

River Plate

- Metropolitano: 1977, 1979, 1980
- Nacional: 1979

Independiente

- Metropolitano: 1983

=== International ===
Argentina

- FIFA World Cup: 1978
