= Alberto Fanesi =

Argentine footballer and manager (born 1948)

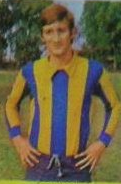
- Fanesi in 1970

Personal information
- Full name: Alberto José Fanesi
- Date of birth: 16 February 1948 (age 78)
- Place of birth: Casilda, Argentina
- Position: Defender

Senior career*
Years	Team	Apps	(Gls)
–1968	Deportivo Armenio		
1968–1972	Rosario Central	115	(0)
1973–1977	Huracán	170	(2)
1978–1980	Quilmes	109	(1)

Managerial career
- 1990–1991: Gimnasia de La Plata
- 1991–1992: Huracán
- 1997–1999: Quilmes
- 2001–2002: Vélez Sársfield
- 2004: Vélez Sársfield
- 2006: Club Guaraní
- 2007–2008: Quilmes
- * Club domestic league appearances and goals

Alberto José Fanesi (born 16 February 1948) is an Argentine football manager and former player. As a player, he won the Argentine championship with three teams.

== Coaching career ==
Fanesi has coached at Gimnasia La Plata, Huracan, Vélez Sársfield, Quilmes and Unión de Mar del Plata.

== Honours ==
Season	Team	Title
1971 Nacional	Rosario Central	Primera División Argentina
1973 Metropolitano	Huracán	Primera División Argentina
1978 Metropolitano	Quilmes	Primera División Argentina
