= 1972 Argentine Primera División =

Primera División
- Season: 1972
- Dates: 25 February – 17 December
- Champions: Metropolitano: San Lorenzo (9th. title); Nacional: San Lorenzo (10th. title)
- 1973 Copa Libertadores: San Lorenzo; River Plate

The 1972 Primera División season was the 81st season of top-flight football in Argentina. Banfield was penalised with a 4-month suspension and the subsequent points deduction after a proved bribe. The case referred back to the 1971 Metropolitano when Banfield was about to be relegated along with Los Andes. A Banfield executive offered Ferro Carril Oeste players (their rivals in the last fixture of the tournament) a high amount of money to fix the match. Nevertheless, the meeting was reported to the police who arrested the executive. Banfield would be then penalised by the AFA.

With Lanús (1970 Primera B Metropolitana champions) as the only team promoted from the lower division, San Lorenzo won both tournaments, Metropolitano and Nacional (9th and 10th league titles). San Lorenzo and River Plate (Torneo Nacional champion and runner-up) qualified for the 1973 Copa Libertadores. On the other hand, Banfield and Lanús were relegated via Torneo Reclasificatorio.

== Metropolitano Championship ==
Metropolitano
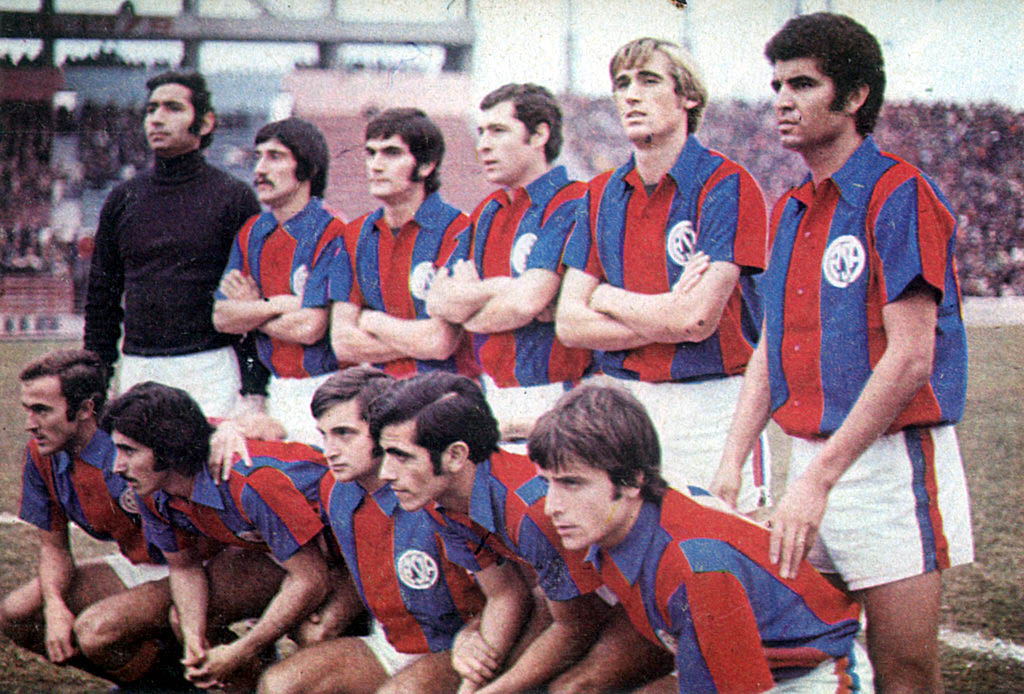
- San Lorenzo, Metropolitano champions
- Season: 1972
- Dates: 25 February – 1 October
- Champions: San Lorenzo (9th title)
- Promoted: Lanús
- Relegated: Banfield; Lanús
- Top goalscorer: (Argentina) Miguel Brindisi (21)
- Biggest home win: R. Central 6–0 Independiente (16 Apr)
- Biggest away win: Estudiantes LP 1–7 Boca Jrs (17 Mar)

=== Final standings ===
Pos	Team	Pld	W	D	L	GF	GA	GD	Pts	Qualification or relegation
1	San Lorenzo	34	18	13	3	59	33	+26	49	Champion
2	Racing	34	14	15	5	56	44	+12	43	
3	Huracán	34	14	12	8	66	49	+17	40	
3	River Plate	34	15	10	9	64	52	+12	40	
5	Vélez Sársfield	34	14	11	9	59	50	+9	39	
6	Rosario Central	34	14	10	10	51	39	+12	38	
7	Newell's Old Boys	34	13	12	9	49	49	0	38	
8	Chacarita Juniors	34	13	11	10	46	41	+5	37	
9	Boca Juniors	34	12	12	10	56	44	+12	36	
10	Colón	34	14	8	12	51	52	−1	36	
11	Independiente	34	12	11	11	47	48	−1	35	
12	Argentinos Juniors	34	10	14	10	52	37	+15	34	
13	Estudiantes (LP)	34	14	5	15	40	52	−12	33	Reclasificatorio
14	Atlanta	34	12	7	15	43	54	−11	31	Reclasificatorio
15	Gimnasia y Esgrima (LP)	34	8	10	16	40	55	−15	26	Reclasificatorio
16	Ferro Carril Oeste	34	6	12	16	39	55	−16	24	Reclasificatorio
17	Lanús	34	3	6	25	35	71	−36	12	Reclasificatorio
18	Banfield	34	7	7	20	25	53	−28	0 (Note: 21 points were deducted after the team was suspended for four months, starting on March 16.)	Reclasificatorio

=== Reclasificatorio Tournament ===
Pos	Team	Pld	W	D	L	GF	GA	GD	Pts
1	Ferro Carril Oeste	5	3	2	0	16	10	+6	8
2	Atlanta	5	2	1	2	14	12	+2	5
3	Gimnasia y Esgrima (LP)	5	1	2	2	9	12	−3	4
4	Estudiantes (LP)	5	1	2	2	4	11	−7	4
5	Lanús	5	0	2	3	4	8	−4	2
6	Banfield	5	2	3	0	15	9	+6	0 (Note: 7 points were deducted after the team was suspended for four months, starting on March 16.)

=== Relegation table ===
To determine relegations of teams playing the Reclasificatorio, points earned in Metropolitano and Reclasificatorio were taken into account. The two clubs with the lowest points earned were relegated.

Rank.	Team	Points Metrop.	Points Reclas.	Total points
1	Estudiantes (LP)	33	4	37
2	Atlanta	31	5	36
3	Ferro Carril Oeste	24	8	32
4	Gimnasia y Esgrima (LP)	26	4	30
5	Lanús	12	2	14
6	Banfield	0	7	7

=== Top scorers ===
Rank.	Player	Team	Goals
1	(Argentina) Miguel Brindisi	Huracán	21
2	(Argentina) Roque Avallay	Huracán	17
3	(Argentina) Carlos Bianchi	Vélez Sarsfield	16
3	(Argentina) Hugo Curioni	Boca Juniors	16
4	(Argentina) Rubén Ayala	San Lorenzo	15

== Nacional Championship ==
Nacional
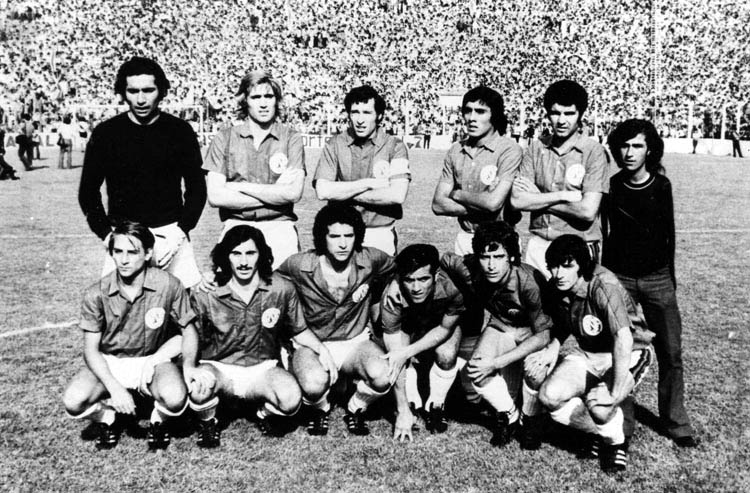
- San Lorenzo, Nacional champions
- Season: 1972
- Dates: 13 October – 17 December
- Champions: San Lorenzo (10th title)
- 1973 Copa Libertadores: San Lorenzo; River Plate
- Top goalscorer: (Argentina) Carlos Morete (14)
- Biggest home win: Argentinos 7–0 Sp. Desamparados (6 Dec)
- Biggest away win: B. Mitre 1–7 River Plate (23 Oct)
- Highest scoring: Newell's 7–2 Banfield (25 Nov); River Plate 7–2 Independiente (1 Dec)

=== Group A ===
Pos	Team	Pld	W	D	L	GF	GA	GD	Pts	Qualification
1	San Lorenzo	13	10	3	0	29	6	+23	23	Final
2	River Plate	13	10	2	1	50	23	+27	22	Semifinal
3	Vélez Sársfield	13	8	2	3	31	19	+12	18	
4	San Martín (M)	13	7	3	3	27	21	+6	17	
5	Atlanta	13	6	4	3	31	15	+16	16	
6	Rosario Central	13	5	4	4	28	18	+10	14	
7	Independiente	13	4	5	4	24	20	+4	13	
8	San Lorenzo (MdP)	13	5	2	6	24	28	−4	12	
9	Lanús	13	3	5	5	17	23	−6	11	
10	Gimnasia y Esgrima (LP)	13	3	3	7	13	24	−11	9	
11	San Martín (T)	13	2	2	9	10	25	−15	6	
12	Bartolomé Mitre	13	1	2	10	11	36	−25	4	
13	Independiente (T)	13	0	3	10	10	46	−36	3	

=== Group B ===
Pos	Team	Pld	W	D	L	GF	GA	GD	Pts	Qualification
1	Boca Juniors	13	10	2	1	31	15	+16	22	Semifinal
2	Colón	13	8	2	3	21	16	+5	18	
3	Argentinos Juniors	13	7	3	3	26	16	+10	17	
4	Huracán	13	6	4	3	26	20	+6	16	
5	Racing	13	6	1	6	20	18	+2	13	
6	Belgrano	13	4	5	4	19	18	+1	13	
7	Banfield	13	5	3	5	23	27	−4	13	
8	Ferro Carril Oeste	13	4	4	5	20	20	0	12	
9	Desamparados	13	4	4	5	15	25	−10	12	
10	Chacarita Juniors	13	3	5	5	19	18	+1	11	
11	Gimnasia y Esgrima (M)	13	2	6	5	18	23	−5	10	
12	Estudiantes (LP)	13	2	4	7	12	25	−13	8	
13	Newell's Old Boys	13	2	1	10	18	28	−10	5	

=== Semifinal ===
Team 1	Res.	Team 2	Venue	City
River Plate	3–2	Boca Juniors	Vélez Sarsfield	Buenos Aires

=== Final ===
Team 1	Res.	Team 2	Venue	City
San Lorenzo	1–0 (a.e.t.)	River Plate	Vélez Sarsfield	Buenos Aires

==== Match details ====
1972 Campeonato Nacional Final
17 December 1972

San Lorenzo	1–0 (a.e.t.)	River Plate
Figueroa 102'	Report

Vélez Sársfield
Attendance: 53,000
Referee: (Argentina) Roberto Goicochea

San Lorenzo	River Plate

GK	1	(Argentina) Agustín Irusta
DF	4	(Argentina) Sergio Villar
DF	2	(Argentina) Ricardo Rezza
DF	6	(Argentina) Ramón Heredia
DF	3	(Argentina) Antonio Rosl (c)
MF	8	(Argentina) Roberto Telch
MF	5	(Argentina) Roberto Espósito
MF	10	(Argentina) Victorio Cocco
FW	7	(Argentina) Luciano Figueroa	(substituted off) 115'
FW	9	(Argentina) Rubén Ayala	(substituted off) 115'
FW	11	(Argentina) Enrique Chazarreta
Substitutes:
FW		(Argentina) Oscar Ortiz	(substituted on) 115'
FW		(Argentina) José Sanfilippo	(substituted on) 115'
Manager:
(Argentina) Juan Carlos Lorenzo

GK	1	(Argentina) José A. Pérez
DF	4	(Argentina) Osvaldo Pérez
DF	2	(Argentina) Jorge Dominichi
MF	6	(Argentina) René Daulte
DF	3	(Argentina) Raúl Giustozzi
MF	8	(Argentina) Juan José López
DF	5	(Argentina) Jorge Vázquez	Red card
FW	10	(Argentina) Norberto Alonso
MF	7	(Argentina) Ernesto Mastrángelo	(substituted off) 72'
FW	9	(Argentina) Carlos Morete
FW	11	(Argentina) Oscar Más
Substitutes:
FW		(Argentina) Néstor Scotta	(substituted on) 72'
Manager:
(Argentina) Juan E. Urriolabeitía

=== Top scorers ===
Rank.	Player	Team	Goals
1	(Argentina) Carlos Morete	River Plate	14
2	(Argentina) Oscar Más	River Plate	13
3	(Argentina) Hugo Curioni	Boca Juniors	12
3	(Argentina) Carlos Guerini	Belgrano (C)	12
4	(Argentina) Juan Barroso	San Martín (M)	11
4	(Argentina) Carlos Bianchi	Vélez Sarsfield	11
4	(Argentina) Juan Taverna	Banfield	11
