= Diego Monarriz =

Argentine footballer and manager

Personal information
- Full name: Diego Oscar Monarriz
- Date of birth: 2 March 1968 (age 58)
- Place of birth: Buenos Aires, Argentina
- Position: Midfielder

Youth career
- San Lorenzo

Senior career*
Years	Team	Apps	(Gls)
1987–1992	San Lorenzo	36	(1)
1993	Orlando Pirates		
1994	All Boys		
1995	Belgrano	4	(0)
1997–1998	El Porvenir	16	(2)
Total		56	(3)

Managerial career
- 2002–2005: San Lorenzo (youth)
- 2005–2009: River Plate (youth)
- 2011–2013: Vélez Sarsfield (youth)
- 2014–2016: Rosario Central (assistant)
- 2017: Tijuana (assistant)
- 2018–2019: San Lorenzo (reserves)
- 2018: San Lorenzo (interim)
- 2019: San Lorenzo (interim)
- 2019–2020: San Lorenzo
- 2020–2021: San Lorenzo (reserves)
- 2021–2022: San Lorenzo (assistant)
- 2021: San Lorenzo (interim)
- 2022: Rosario Central (assistant)
- 2022: Aldosivi (assistant)
- 2023: Atlético Mineiro (assistant)
- 2024–2025: Juventud de Las Piedras
- 2026: Danubio
- * Club domestic league appearances and goals

Diego Oscar Monarriz (born 2 March 1968) is an Argentine football manager and former player who played as a midfielder.

== Career ==
Monarriz played for San Lorenzo, All Boys, Belgrano and El Porvenir in his home country, aside from a short period at South African side Orlando Pirates. After retiring, he worked as a youth coach before taking over San Lorenzo in an interim manner in 2018, after Claudio Biaggio resigned.

Monarriz returned to his previous role after the appointment of Jorge Almirón, but on 1 November 2019, he replaced Juan Antonio Pizzi as manager; initially an interim, he was later promoted to manager. He resigned on 22 February 2020, and subsequently returned to the reserve squad.

In 2022, Monarriz was Leandro Somoza's assistant at Rosario Central and Aldosivi, before joining Eduardo Coudet's staff at Brazilian club Atlético Mineiro ahead of the 2023 season. In January 2024, he was appointed manager of Uruguayan Segunda División side Juventud de Las Piedras, and achieved promotion at the end of the season.

On 13 October 2025, despite qualifying the club to the 2026 Copa Sudamericana, Monarriz was sacked by Juventud. On 12 December, he took over Danubio also in the top tier, but was dismissed on 5 April 2026.
