= Jorge Castelli =

Argentine football manager

Jorge Hugo Castelli (12 May 1946 – 16 July 2007) was an Argentine football strength and conditioning coach and manager.

== Early life ==
Castelli was born in 1946 in Buenos Aires, Argentina.

== Career ==
Castelli began his career as strength and conditioning coach of the team of Boca Juniors trained by Juan Carlos Lorenzo from 1976 to 1979. He managed Argentine side Atlanta in the 1989/90 season, leading the club to achieve promotion. In the subsequent years, Castelli worked as manager of Union de Santa Fe, San Lorenzo de Almagro and Newell's Old Boys. After that, he managed the Haiti national football team.

== Personal life ==
Castelli was married and had two children.
