= San Lorenzo de Almagro =

Argentine sports club

San Lorenzo
- Full name: Club Atlético San Lorenzo de Almagro
- Nicknames: Los Santos (Saints); Los Cuervos (Crows); El Ciclón (Cyclone); Azulgrana (Blue and Red); Los Matadores (Killers); Gauchos de Boedo (Gauchos of Boedo); El Gigante de Boedo (Giant of Boedo)
- Founded: 1 April 1908; 118 years ago
- Ground: Estadio Pedro Bidegain
- Capacity: 47,964
- Chairman: Marcelo Culotta
- Manager: Rubén Darío Insúa
- League: Primera División
- 2025: 7th of 30
- Website: sanlorenzo.com.ar
Home colours	Away colours	Third colours

Club Atlético San Lorenzo de Almagro (CASLA) is an Argentine professional sports club based in the Boedo neighborhood of Buenos Aires. It is best known for its football team, which plays in the Primera División, the first tier of the Argentine football league system. San Lorenzo is also considered one of the Big Five of Argentine football, along with Independiente, River Plate, Boca Juniors, and Racing Club.

San Lorenzo plays its home games at Estadio Pedro Bidegain, popularly known as Nuevo Gasómetro. The stadium and sports facilities are located in the Bajo Flores neighborhood of Buenos Aires. The club's previous stadium was the Viejo Gasómetro, located in Boedo. In 1979, the Gasómetro was expropriated by the de facto Government of Argentina and then sold to supermarket chain Carrefour. The club currently has six locations: three in Boedo, one in Monserrat, one at Bajo Flores, and one in Villa Gesell. San Lorenzo also plans to expand its main seat on La Plata Avenue, while a 15-hectare campus in Ezeiza is projected to develop an Olympic football program.

San Lorenzo's historical rival is Huracán, located in Parque Patricios. The two clubs play one of the older derbies in Argentina. Some supporters consider this derby as the third-most important after Superclásico and Clásico de Avellaneda, in addition to being one of the most uneven derbies of Argentine Football.

Other sports practised at the club are artistic roller skating, basketball, field hockey, futsal, handball, martial arts, roller hockey, swimming, tennis, and volleyball. Some years ago, San Lorenzo had also opened a rugby union section, but it is no longer active. San Lorenzo gained international recognition in March 2013 with the election of Pope Francis, a supporter and socio (member) of the club. The players played with the Pope's photo on their shirts during a league match against Colón on 16 March 2013.

== History ==
=== Origins of the club ===
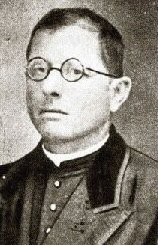
Father Lorenzo Massa, honoured by the founders giving his first name to the institution

The roots of the institution are a team formed by a group of children that played football in the corner of México and Treinta y Tres Orientales streets of Buenos Aires. Due to increasing traffic in the city, playing football in the streets became a risky activity for the boys. Lorenzo Massa, the Catholic priest of the neighbourhood's church, saw how a tram almost knocked down one of the boys while they were playing in the streets. As a way to prevent more accidents, he offered the boys to play in the church's backyard, under the condition they go to mass on Sundays.

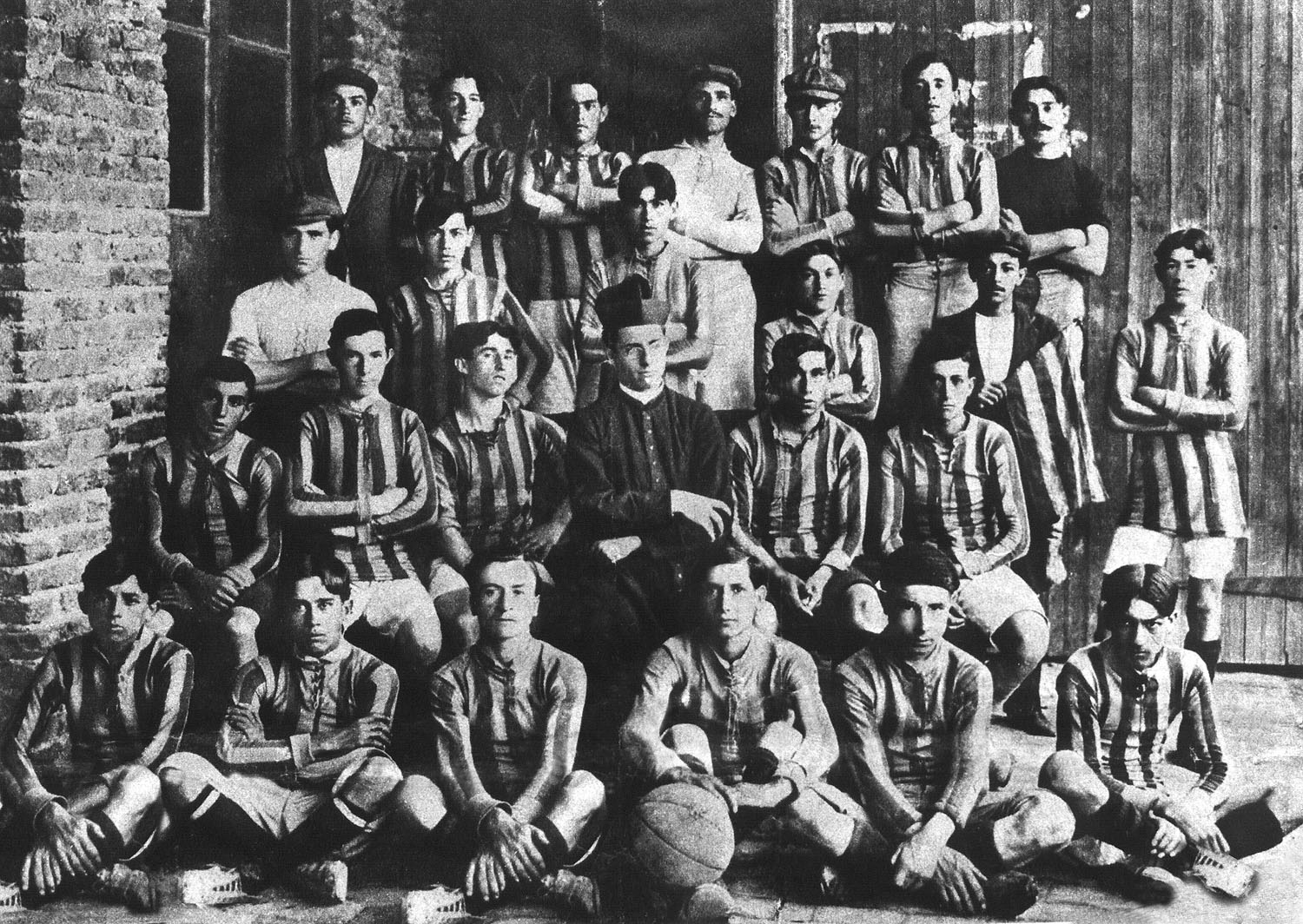
An early San Lorenzo team posing with father Lorenzo Massa, c. 1908

On 1 April 1908, an assembly was held in the Almagro district of Buenos Aires with the purpose of establishing a club. During the meeting, several names were proposed. The first option was "Los Forzosos de Almagro" ("The Strongmen of Almagro", the name used by the boys for their street football squad), which did not sound good to Father Massa (who was present). The other proposal was to name the club "San Lorenzo" as an homage to Massa, but he declined to be so honoured.

Nevertheless, the name was finally accepted by the priest, explaining that the name would not honour himself but both Lawrence of Rome ("San Lorenzo" in Spanish) and the Battle of San Lorenzo, one of the most significant combats for the Independence of Argentina. Another founding member, Federico Monti, suggested to add the name of the neighbourhood, Almagro where most of the members lived, which was accepted by the assembly.

Due to the team not having its own a stadium, San Lorenzo began to play its home games in a field of the Club Martínez, placed in the nearby town of the same name. The squad played its first match on 26 April 1914. At the end of the season, San Lorenzo had to play a final match against Excursionistas to declare a champion. San Lorenzo won the series (the results were 0–0 and 5–0). This title allowed San Lorenzo to enter the playoffs in for promotion to the Argentine Primera División, which was finally obtained after beating Club Honor y Patria by 3–0.

=== First years in Primera ===
San Lorenzo began to play in the Argentine Football Association tournaments on 26 April 1914 in the second division, where the team finished sharing first place with Excursionistas. As a result, both teams played a two-match series to determine which team would proceed to the playoffs. San Lorenzo won the series after thrashing Excursionistas 5–0 in the second game. In playoffs, San Lorenzo eliminated other teams before playing the final against Honor y Patria, winning 3–0 and being promoted to Primera División.´

San Lorenzo made its debut in Primera on 4 April 1915, losing to Platense by 5–1. The first match won in the top division was the 7th fixture, when the team defeated Floresta by 3–1. San Lorenzo finished 12th at the end of the season, tied with Gimnasia y Esgrima de Buenos Aires. On 7 May 1916, the club inaugurated its first stadium (popularly known as "Viejo Gasómetro" during a match against Estudiantes de La Plata, which San Lorenzo won by 2–1. That same year, the team finished 7th in the Primera División championship. In subsequent tournaments the team did not wage good campaigns, finishing 12th and 13th. In 1919 the Argentine league split into two leagues, the official Asociación Argentina and dissident Asociación Amateur (AAm), in which San Lorenzo took part, along with Racing Club, River Plate and Independiente, among other teams. San Lorenzo finished 9th.

=== The success begins ===
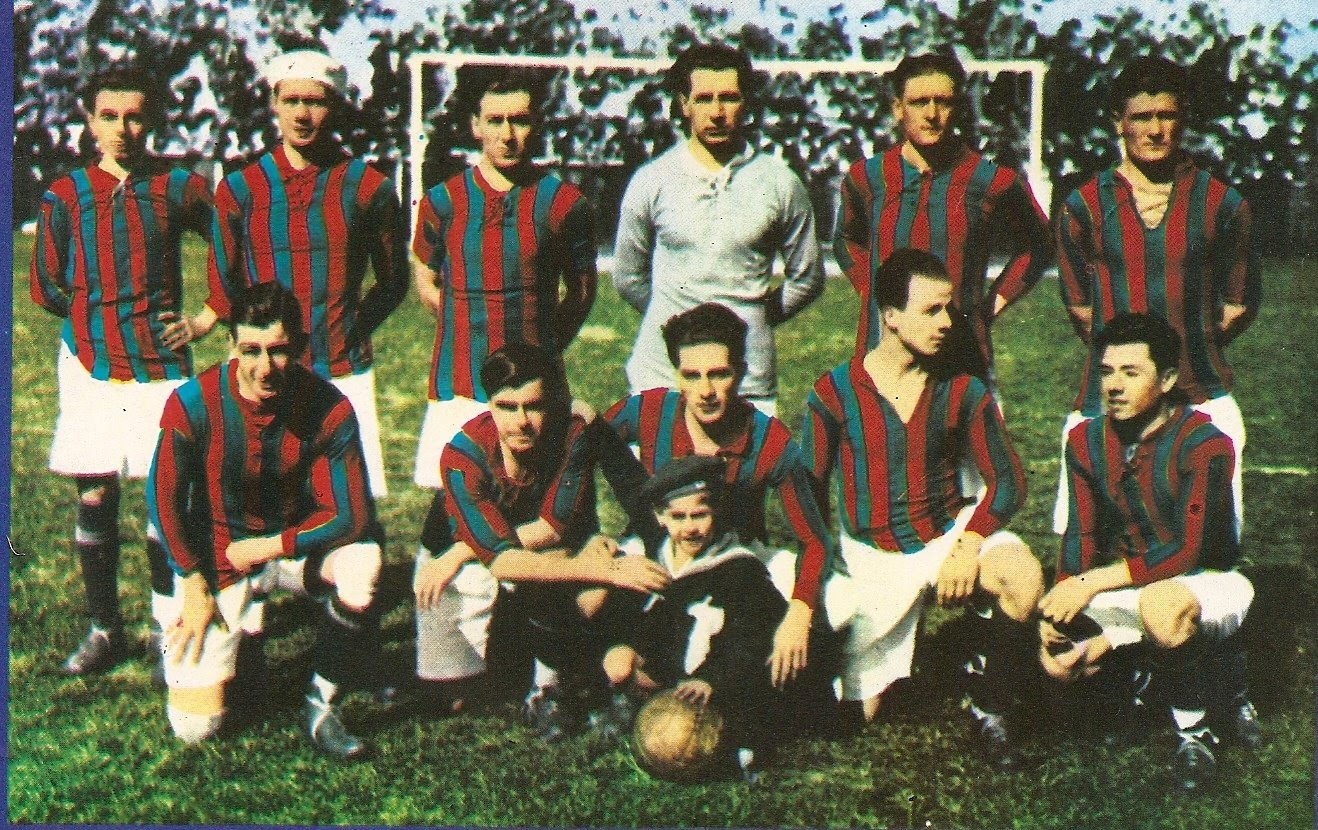
The San Lorenzo team that won its first Primera División title in 1923

In 1920 and 1922, San Lorenzo finished third, finally winning its first title in 1923. The squad won 17 of 20 games, only losing 2. San Lorenzo scored 34 goals in 20 fixtures, conceding 13. That same year the squad also won its first international title, The Copa Campeonato del Río de la Plata after beating Montevideo Wanderers 1–0 in the final.

San Lorenzo won its second consecutive Primera División title one year later. The team played 23 matches winning 18 with 2 losses, with a total of 48 goals scored and 15 conceded. In the following two seasons (1925 and 1926) San Lorenzo would make great performances finishing 2nd to Racing Club and Independiente respectively finally achieving its 3rd title in 1927, when both leagues AAF and AAm had joined again. The squad totaled 57 points in 33 matches played with an outstanding mark of 86 goals scored (2,60 per game) and conceding only 26.

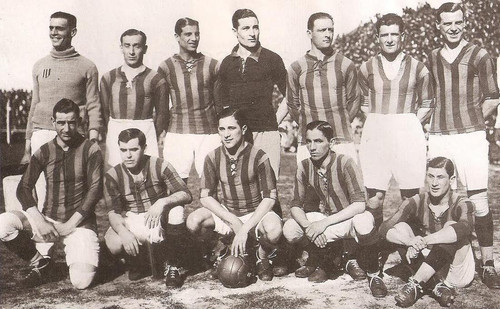
The 1927 team won both the Primera División and Copa Aldao championships

Apart from winning the domestic league, in 1927 San Lorenzo won its first and only Copa Aldao, after defeating Uruguayan team (Rampla Juniors) by 1–0. The club soon became one of the most popular institutions in Argentina, increasing its number of followers and being counted in the top five (cinco grandes) together with Boca Juniors, Independiente, River Plate and Racing Club.

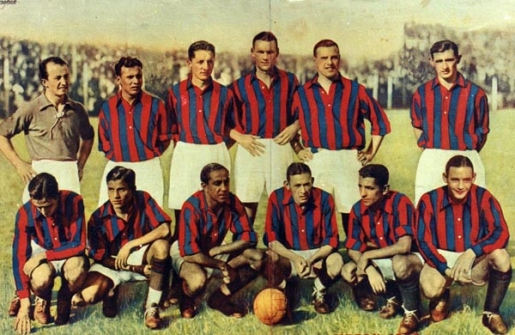
The team that won its third league championship in 1933

In the 1930s, Isidro Lángara and other players of Basque descent endeared San Lorenzo to the Basque community. The team also relied on players from the provinces, known as los gauchos. San Lorenzo returned to success in 1933, when the team won its 4th league championship. The squad totaled 50 points with 22 wins, 6 losses and 6 draws. San Lorenzo scored 81 goals and conceded 48. Boca Juniors was the runner-up while Racing Club finished 3rd.

In 1936, there were two championships within the year, in a format of single-robin tournaments. San Lorenzo won the first round (named "Copa de Honor" for the occasion) while River Plate won the second round ("Copa Campeonato"). Although titles were recognised as official by the Association, both champions, San Lorenzo and River Plate, had to play a match (named "Copa de Oro") in order to define which team would play the Copa Aldao match v. the Uruguayan Primera División champion. Finally, River Plate won the game by 4–2 and qualified to play Peñarol.

=== The 1940s: "The best team in the world" ===
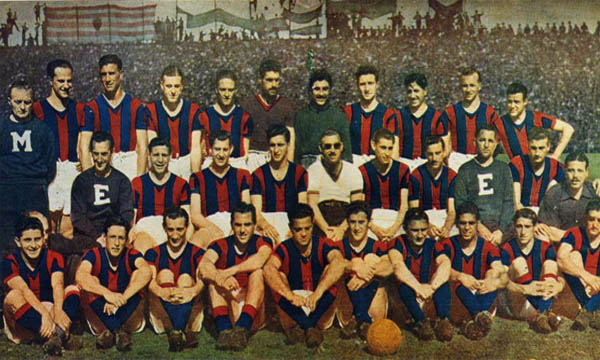
San Lorenzo league champion team in 1946

In 1943, San Lorenzo won the national cup, the Copa General Pedro Ramírez, named in honor of Pedro Pablo Ramírez, the de facto president of Argentina by then. San Lorenzo won the trophy by defeating General Paz Juniors 8–3.

After the 1936 success, San Lorenzo would not win a league title for ten years, when in 1946 proclaimed champion with a total of 46 points (the runner-up, Boca Juniors, finished 2nd. with 42). San Lorenzo also scored a record of 90 goals in 30 games played, only conceding 37.

That same year (1946), the team went on to a tour of Spain and Portugal that was one of the highlights of the club's history. The team debuted playing Atlético Aviación winning 4–1. San Lorenzo played a total of 10 matches in Europe, with some extraordinary victories over the Spanish national team (7–5 and 6–1). The Spanish crowd at the stadium acclaimed San Lorenzo as "Son els millor del mon" ("You are the best in the world" in Catalan). San Lorenzo then moved to Portugal where the squad showed its skilled play, thrashing Porto (9–4) and the Portugal national team by 10–4. The only team that defeated San Lorenzo was Real Madrid by 4–1.

As a result of the successful tour, player René Pontoni was offered a contract with Barcelona, but declined to leave Argentina (Barcelona then drafted River Plate's Alfredo Di Stéfano). Fellow player Rinaldo Martino did stay in European football and would later become a star with Juventus.

==== European tour details ====
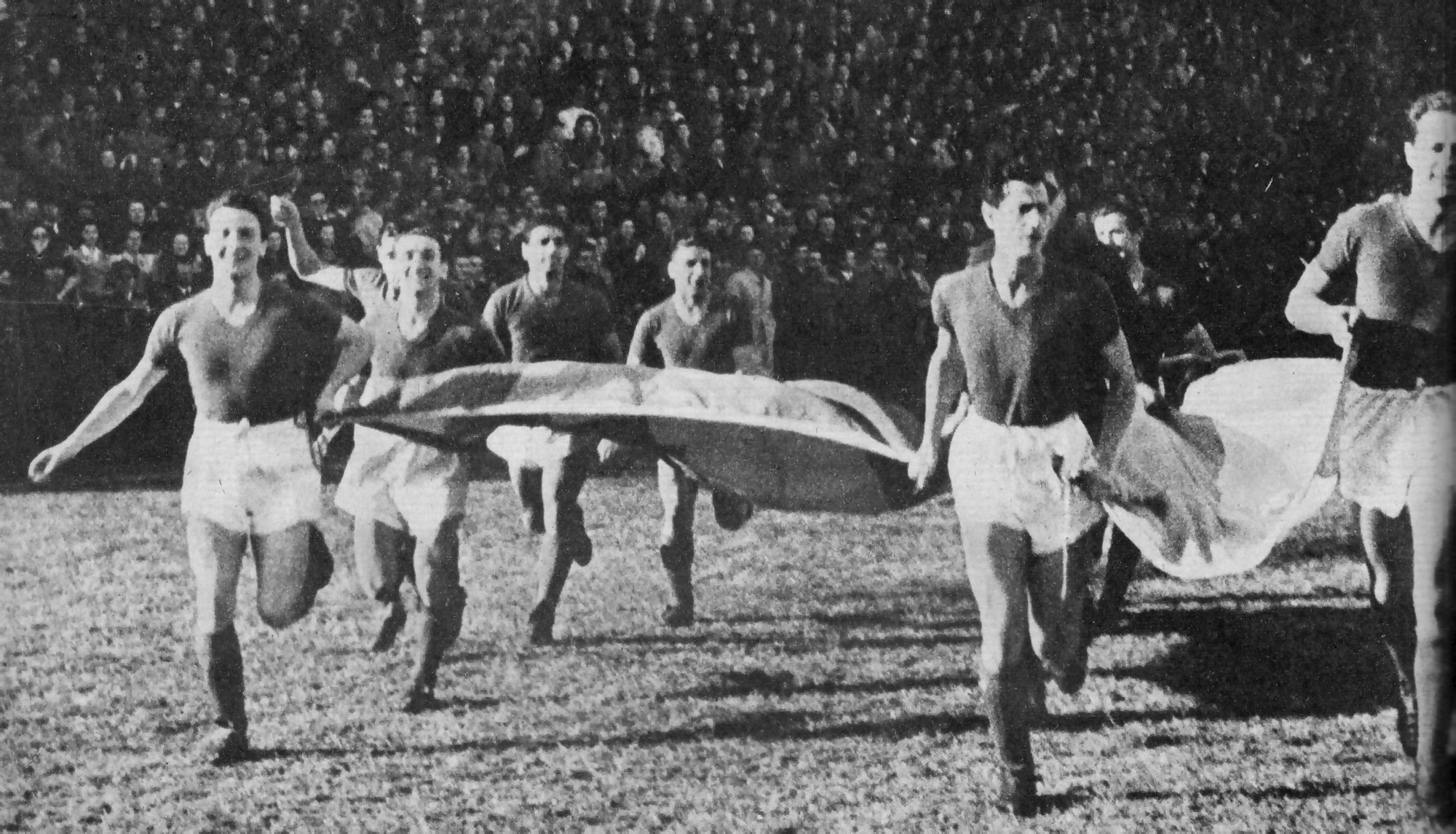
San Lorenzo players taking the pitch before playing a friendly match v. Spain on 16 January 1947

1946–47 tour on Spain and Portugal
Date	Rival	Result
1946-12-23	Atlético Aviación	4–1
1946-12-25	Real Madrid	1–4
1947-01-01	Spain national team	7–5
1947-01-05	Athletic de Bilbao	3–3
1947-01-16	Spain national team	6–1
1947-01-22	Valencia	1–1
1947-01-26	Dep. La Coruña	0–0
1947-01-31	Porto	9–4
1947-02-02	Portugal national team	10–4
1947-01-26	Sevilla	5–5

=== The 1960s, 1970s, and 1980s ===
In the 1960s, a generation of players known as carasucias (literally: dirty faces) were the darling of Argentine fans because of their offensive, careless playing and their bad-boy antics off the pitch. The 1968 team was nicknamed los matadores as it won the championship without losing a single game. This team was recognized as the best team in the world by many journalists. In the years 1968–1974 San Lorenzo won four league titles, its best harvest ever. In 1972, the club became the first Argentine team to win two league titles in one year.

Poor administrations, however, led San Lorenzo to a huge economic crisis. Argentina's military government coerced the club into selling the historic stadium located in Boedo. The team was relegated in 1981, only to return to the top division with great fanfare in the 1982 season, which set all-time attendance records for the club.

=== The 1990s ===
By that time, the club had no stadium and was plagued by debt and irregularities. Controversial president Fernando Miele (1986–2001) delivered both the new stadium and two league titles: the Clausura 1995 (after 21 years without winning a first division title) and the Clausura 2001 (in which the team achieved 11 consecutive victories). San Lorenzo finished the Clausura 2001 with 47 points in a tournament of 19 matches, setting the record for the highest points haul since the inception of the Apertura and Clausura system in 1990.

=== The New Millennium ===
In late 2001, San Lorenzo won their first international title: the Copa Mercosur 2001, becoming the only Argentine team to win that international cup, because the others champions were all from Brazil.

San Lorenzo also won the first edition of the Copa Sudamericana, the 2002 edition, beating Colombian club Atlético Nacional in the finals. This was their second international title, which gave them the opportunity to play the Recopa against the Copa Libertadores champion, Paraguayan club Olimpia. In the 2003 Recopa played in Los Angeles, United States, San Lorenzo lost to Olimpia 2–0 and finished runner-up.

In June 2007, San Lorenzo won the Clausura 2007 league title, beating Boca Juniors in the race for the title by 6 points, even though Boca had beaten them 7–1 in the Apertura 2006. Led by manager Ramón Díaz, San Lorenzo secured the title after the 17th round of fixtures, with two games still left. They finished the tournament with 45 points.

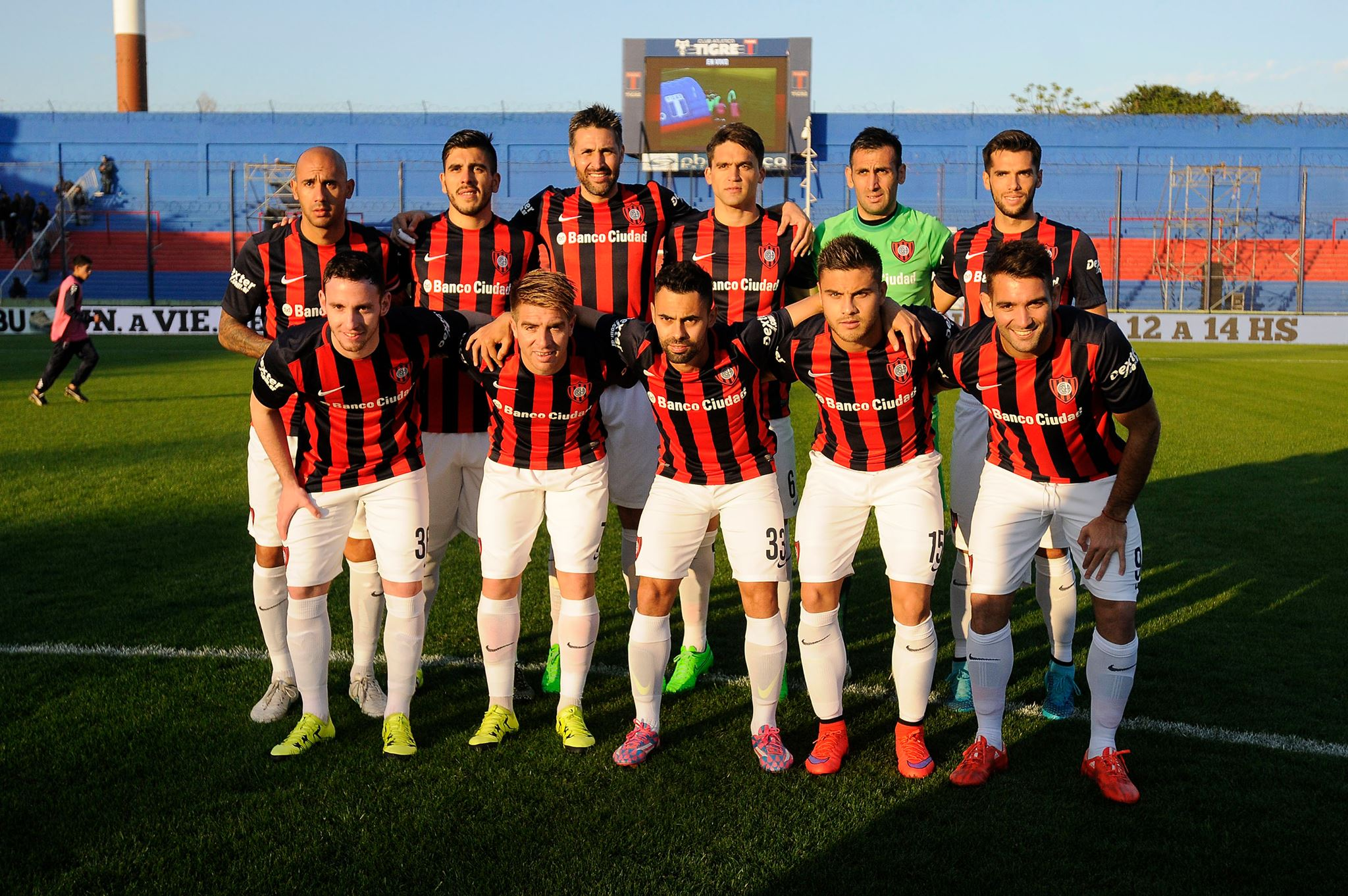
A San Lorenzo team of 2015

Six years later, and only one year after being relegation-threatened, the club managed to win their 15th league title, Torneo Inicial 2013.

In 2014, San Lorenzo won their first Copa Libertadores. They began their campaign by finishing second in its group. In the knockout stage, they beat Gremio on penalties, Cruzeiro, and Bolivar with a very one sided 5–1 aggregate victory in the semi-finals. In the finals, they defeated Nacional of Paraguay 2–1 on aggregate, concluding their championship run with a 1–0 victory in the second leg at Estadio Pedro Bidegain. This earned the club a berth in the 2014 FIFA Club World Cup in Morocco, their first trip to FIFA's premier club tournament. They would ultimately lose in the finals to Real Madrid, and finish as runners-up.

== Stadium ==
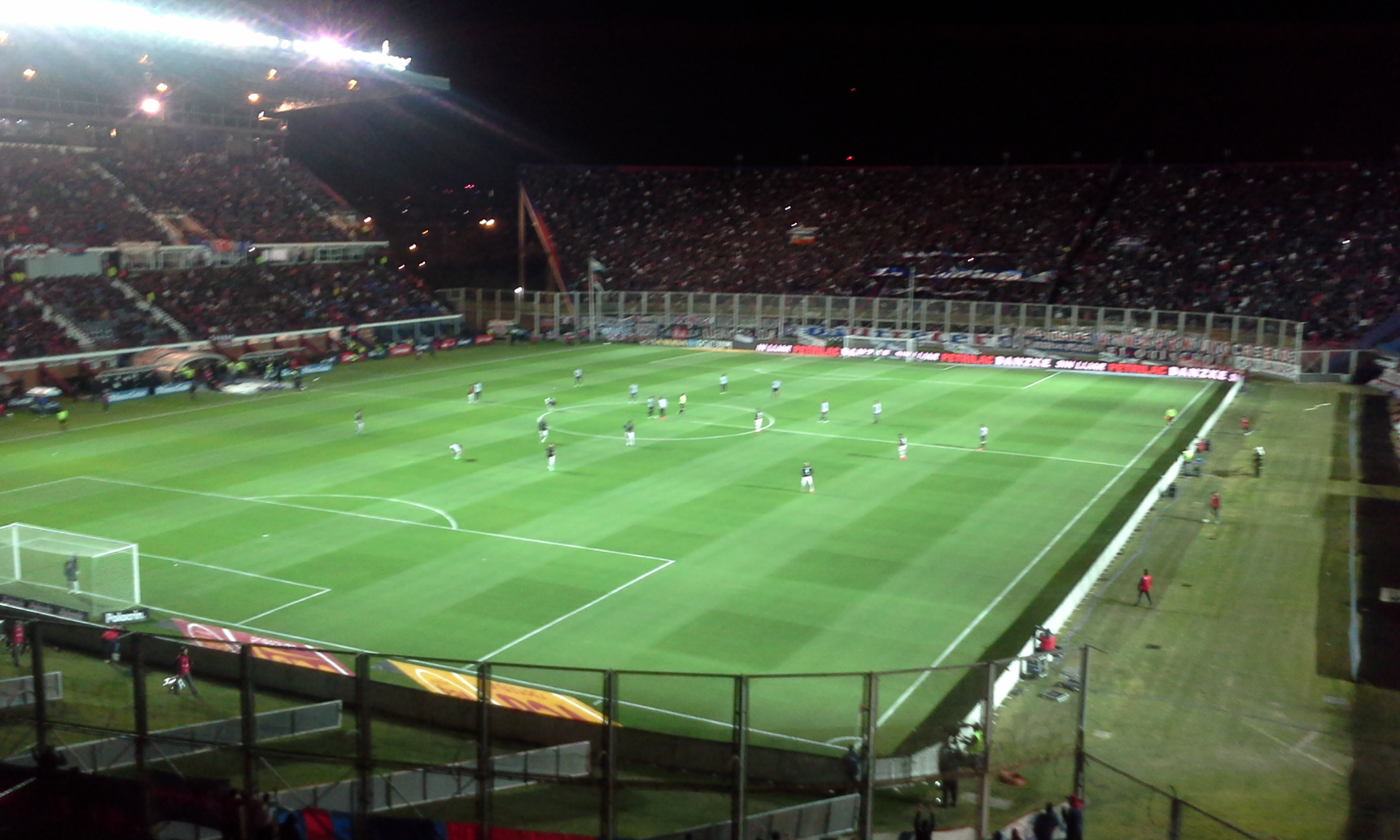
View of the Estadio Pedro Bidegain

The Viejo Gasómetro stadium in what nowadays is known as Boedo was a venue of great renown, where many international games were held. During the military government in 1979 San Lorenzo was forced to sell the stadium for a small amount of money, and a few years later the supermarket chain Carrefour bought it. The price had mysteriously surged eightfold, but the Club did not get any extra money.

After 14 years of renting the stadium, San Lorenzo, with the help of fans, inaugurated the new stadium, Estadio Pedro Bidegain (nicknamed Nuevo Gasómetro), which opened in December 1993 at the intersection of the Perito Moreno and Varela avenues in the Bajo Flores neighborhood. The fans, however, never forgot the old stadium, and its former lot is claimed by San Lorenzo and its fans to this day. On 8 March 2012, there was a demonstration attended by over 100,000 people in favour of reclaiming the place for the club, and on 15 November the Buenos Aires City Legislature passed a bill stipulating that, in the course of six months, Carrefour should negotiate a deal with San Lorenzo in order to share the land lot, and if no accommodation was reached then the city would expropriate it with San Lorenzo's funds. First, an extension was agreed to and one-and-a-half years later, it signed an agreement establishing that the multinational retailer will build a smaller new store on a corner of its current property, financed by funds provided by San Lorenzo. The rest of the lot will be handed over to the club, and there are plans to build another new stadium there.

The current stadium has a capacity of 47,964 and the pitch size is 110 x 70 m, among the biggest in Argentina.

== Nicknames ==
- Los Gauchos de Boedo (Boedo's Gauchos): In 1932, San Lorenzo brought players from different provinces from Argentina (principally from Santa Fe Province). Among them are, Alberto Chividini, Gabriel Magán y Genaro Cantelli.
- Los Santos (The Saints): The nickname emerged because the club used The San Antonio's Oratory for soccer activities.
- Los Cuervos (The Crows): Was called so, because of the attire of the priests (black)
- El Ciclón (The Cyclone): San Lorenzo's historical rival is Club Atlético Huracán, which means "hurricane". The nickname is adopted since cyclones are stronger than hurricanes.
- Los Azulgrana (The Blue and Red): The color of the club (Blue and Red).
- Los Matadores (The Killers), originally used for the unbeaten 1968 champions.
- The fans' collective calls itself La Gloriosa (The Glorious).

== Players ==
=== Current squad ===
As of 14 September 2026

Note: Flags indicate national team as defined under FIFA eligibility rules; some limited exceptions apply. Players may hold more than one non-FIFA nationality.

No.	Pos.	Nation	Player
1	GK	ARG	Mateo Clemente
2	DF	COL	Danilo Arboleda
3	DF	ARG	Teo Rodríguez Pagano
5	MF	ARG	Ignacio Perruzzi
6	DF	URU	Mathías De Ritis
7	FW	ARG	Ezequiel Cerutti
8	MF	ARG	Manuel Insaurralde
9	FW	ARG	Alexis Cuello
10	MF	ARG	Facundo Gulli
11	FW	ARG	Matías Reali
13	MF	ARG	Juan Rattalino
14	FW	ARG	Agustín Ladstatter
15	MF	ARG	Mauricio Cardillo
16	DF	URU	Guzmán Corujo
18	FW	COL	Diego Herazo
19	DF	SYR	Emiliano Amor

No.	Pos.	Nation	Player
20	GK	ARG	Facundo Altamirano
21	FW	ARG	Gustavo Del Prete
22	FW	ARG	Juan Pablo Álvarez
23	DF	ARG	Gastón Hernández (captain)
24	MF	ARG	Nicolás Tripichio
25	GK	ARG	José Devecchi
26	MF	ARG	Gonzalo Abrego (on loan from Godoy Cruz)
27	MF	ARG	Martín Río (on loan from Talleres)
28	FW	ARG	Nahuel Barrios
29	FW	ARG	Rodrigo Auzmendi (on loan from Querétaro)
30	DF	ARG	Nahuel Arias
32	DF	ARG	Ezequiel Herrera
35	DF	ARG	Alejo Córdoba
36	DF	ARG	Daniel Herrera
38	MF	ARG	Facundo Farías (on loan from Estudiantes-LP)
42	DF	ARG	Franco Lorenzón

=== Reserve squad ===
Note: Flags indicate national team as defined under FIFA eligibility rules; some limited exceptions apply. Players may hold more than one non-FIFA nationality.

No.	Pos.	Nation	Player
37	FW	ARG	Thiago Perugini
39	MF	ARG	Uriel Ojeda
41	MF	ARG	Alejo Rivas
43	FW	ARG	Valentín Escalante
46	GK	ARG	Demian Talavera
52	MF	ARG	Cristian Gallardo
53	DF	ARG	Ramiro Pedroza
54	DF	ARG	Nicolás Blanco

No.	Pos.	Nation	Player
57	MF	ARG	Valentino Bossio
58	MF	ARG	Tomás Yaciuk
60	DF	ARG	Juan Cruz Crisafulli
61	FW	ARG	Nahuel Romero
62	MF	ARG	Gonzalo Alassia
—	MF	ARG	Ignacio Zaballa
—	FW	ARG	Branco Salinardi

==== Out on loan ====
Note: Flags indicate national team as defined under FIFA eligibility rules; some limited exceptions apply. Players may hold more than one non-FIFA nationality.

No.	Pos.	Nation	Player
16	GK	ARG	Lautaro López Kaleniuk (at Atlanta until 31 December 2026)
24	DF	ARG	Jeremías James (at Magallanes until 31 December 2026)
30	DF	ARG	Francisco Flores (at Deportivo Morón until 31 December 2026)
32	FW	ARG	Facundo Bruera (at Barracas Central until 31 December 2027)

No.	Pos.	Nation	Player
44	DF	ARG	Agustín Lamosa (at Central Norte until 31 December 2026)
46	FW	ARG	Mauro Pérez (at Nueva Chicago until 31 December 2026)
47	FW	ARG	Matías Hernández (at Banfield until 31 December 2027)

=== Individual records ===
==== Most appearances ====
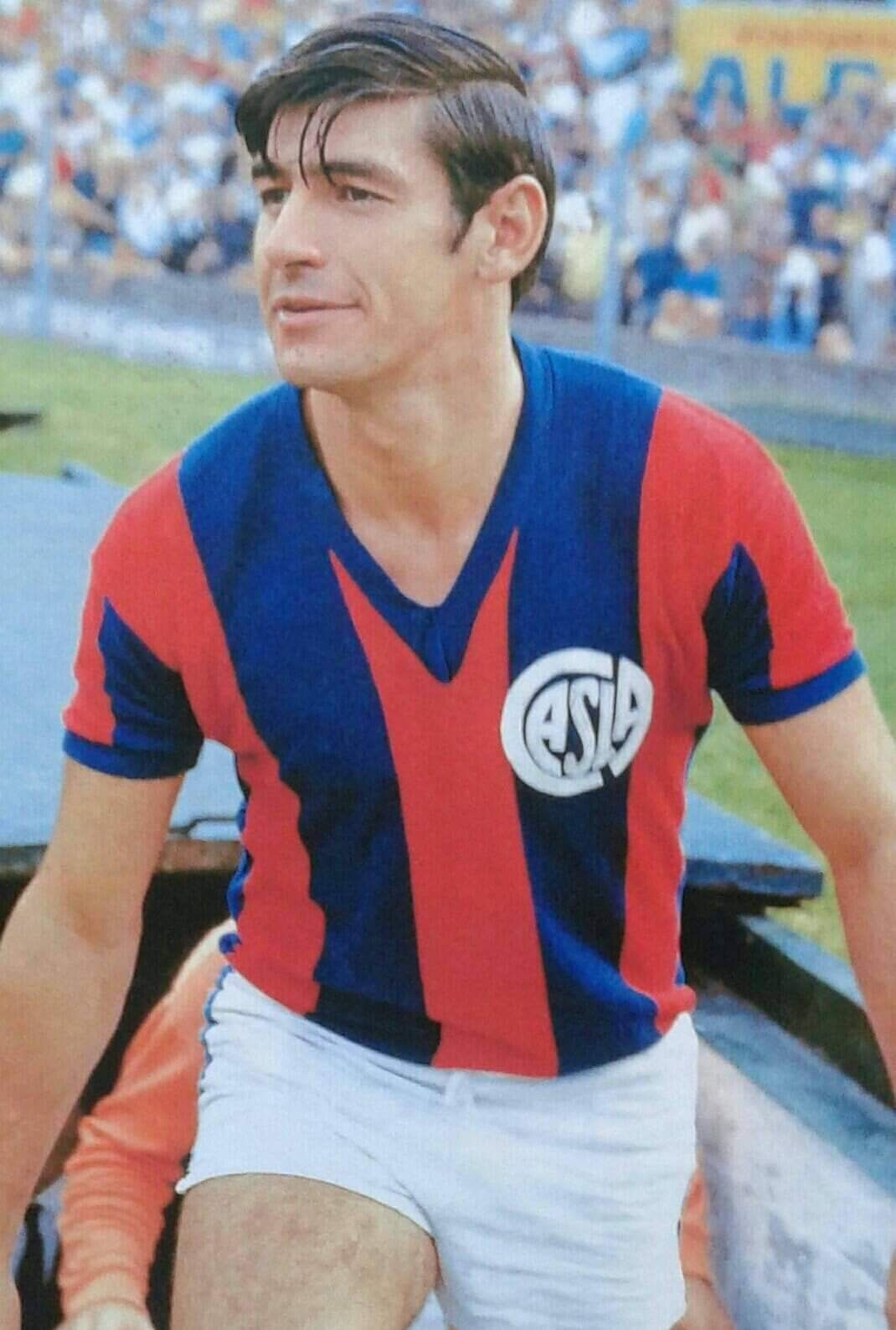
Sergio Villar has the record of matches played.

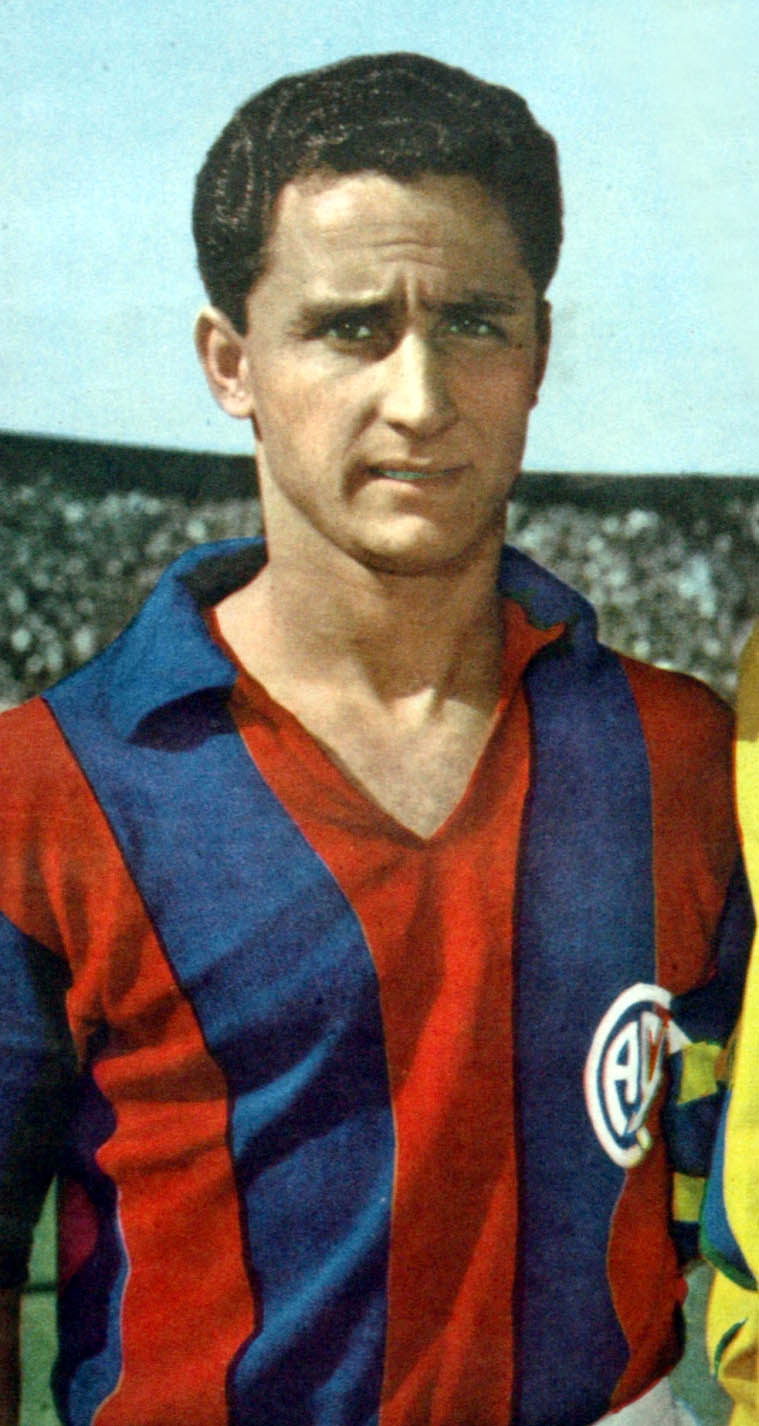
José Sanfilippo is the club's all-time top scorer.

No.	Player	Pos.	Tenure	Match.
1	(Uruguay) Sergio Villar	DF	1968–81	446
2	(Argentina) Roberto Telch	MF	1962–75	415
3	(Argentina) Leandro Romagnoli	MF	1998–2004, 2009–18	383
4	(Spain) Ángel Zubieta	MF	1939–52	353
5	(Argentina) Josè Fossa	DF	1919–34	

==== Top scorers ====
No.	Player	Pos.	Tenure	Goals
1	(Argentina) José Sanfilippo	FW	1953–1963, 1972	217
2	(Argentina) Diego García	FW	1925–40	169
3	(Argentina) Rinaldo Martino	FW	1941–48	165
4	(Argentina) Rodolfo Fischer	FW	1965–72, 1977–78	143
5	(Argentina) Héctor Scotta	RW	1971–81	140

=== Current coaching staff ===
Position	Staff
Head coach	(Argentina) Néstor Gorosito
Assistant coach	(Argentina) Jorge Borelli
Assistant coach	(Argentina) Gustavo Zapata
Assistant coach	(Argentina) Marcelo Villasanti
Fitness coach	(Argentina) Mauricio Rojas
Fitness coach	(Argentina) Sebastián Somoza
Fitness coach	(Argentina) Gastón Rojas
Goalkeeping coach	(Argentina) Juan Carlos Docabo
Doctor	(Argentina) Fernando De Alzáa
Doctor	(Argentina) Martin Bruzzese
Doctor	(Argentina) Pablo Ciavatta
Kinesiologist	(Argentina) Blas Tallarico
Kinesiologist	(Argentina) Fernando Crespo
Kinesiologist	(Argentina) Daniel Veggetti
Nutritionist	(Argentina) Joaquin Gonzalez Saucedo
Professional football staff	(Argentina) Ariel Graña
Kit man	(Argentina) Alejandro Ordax
Kit man	(Argentina) Tomás Lucero
Kit man	(Argentina) Diego Pereira

Last updated: 3 July 2026
Source: Cuerpo Técnico

=== Notable former players ===
- (Argentina) Jacobo Urso (1916–22)
- (Argentina) Alfredo Carricaberry (1920–30)
- (Argentina) Luis Monti (1922–30)
- (Argentina) Diego García (1925–40)
- (Paraguay) Clotardo Dendi (1931)
- (Brazil) Waldemar de Brito (1934–36)
- (Brazil) Alberto Zarzur (1935)
- (Spain) Isidro Lángara (1939–43)
- (Spain) Ángel Zubieta (1939–52)
- (Argentina) Rinaldo Martino (1941–48)
- (Argentina) René Pontoni (1945–48), (1954)
- (Argentina) José Sanfilippo (1953–62), (1972)
- (Paraguay) Ángel Berni (1953–59)
- (Argentina) Norberto Boggio (1957–62)
- (Argentina) Raúl Páez (1958–67)
- (Argentina) Héctor Facundo (1959–63)
- (Argentina) Oscar Rossi (1960–64)
- (Argentina) Alberto Mariotti (1962–64)
- (Argentina) Narciso Doval (1962–68), (1979)
- (Argentina) Roberto Telch (1962–75)
- (Argentina) Rafael Albrecht (1963–70)
- (Argentina) Agustín Irusta (1963–76)
- (Argentina) Héctor Veira (1963–69), (1973)
- (Argentina) Alberto Rendo (1965–69)
- (Argentina) Rodolfo Fischer (1965–72), (1977–78)
- (Argentina) Mario Chaldú (1966–67)
- (Argentina) José Varacka (1966–67)
- (Argentina) Oscar Calics (1966–70)
- (Spain) Antonio García Ameijenda (1967–74)
- (Argentina) Rubén Ayala (1968–73)
- (Argentina) Antonio Rosl (1968–73)
- (Argentina) Victorio Cocco (1968–74)
- (Argentina) Rubén Glaria (1968–74)
- (Argentina) Carlos Veglio (1968–75)
- (Argentina) Rubén Glaria (1968–75)
- (Uruguay) Sergio Villar (1968–81)
- (Argentina) Enrique Chazarreta (1970–75)
- (Argentina) Héctor Scotta (1971–75), (1979), (1981)
- (Argentina) Oscar Ortiz (1971–76)
- (Argentina) Jorge Olguín (1971–79)
- (Argentina) Ricardo Lavolpe (1975–79)
- (Argentina) José Luis Ceballos (1975), (1981)
- (Argentina) Claudio Marangoni (1976–79)
- (Argentina) Rubén Darío Insúa (1978–86)
- (Argentina) Walter Perazzo (1979–88)
- (Argentina) Jorge Higuaín (1982–86)
- (Argentina) Jorge Rinaldi (1983–85), (1991–92)
- (Argentina) Blas Giunta (1983–88)
- (Paraguay) José Luis Chilavert (1985–88)
- (Argentina) Norberto Ortega Sánchez (1985–88), (1994–96)
- (Argentina) Néstor Gorosito (1988–89), (1992–93), (1996–99)
- (Argentina) Alberto Acosta (1988–90), (1992), (1998), (2001–03)
- (Argentina) Leonardo Rodríguez (1990–91), (2001–02)
- (Argentina) Jorge Borelli (1992–96)
- (Argentina) Oscar Passet (1992–99)
- (Honduras) Eduardo Bennet (1993–95)
- (Brazil) Paulo Silas (1993–97)
- (Argentina) Esteban González (1994–95)
- (Argentina) Oscar Ruggeri (1994–97)
- (Venezuela) Gilberto Angelucci (1994–98)
- (Argentina) Fernando Galetto (1994–99)
- (Argentina) Claudio Biaggio (1994–99)
- (Uruguay) Sebastián Abreu (1996–97), (2000–01)
- (Mexico) Guillermo Franco (1996–02)
- (Colombia) Iván Córdoba (1998–00)
- (Argentina) Walter Erviti (1998–02)
- (Paraguay) Claudio Morel (1998–04)
- (Argentina) Bernardo Romeo (1998–01), (2007–10), (2012)
- (Argentina) Leandro Romagnoli (1999–05), (2009–18)
- (Argentina) Sebastián Saja (2000–03), (2005–06)
- (Argentina) Fabricio Coloccini (2000–01), (2016–present)
- (Argentina) Agustín Orion (2001–09)
- (Argentina) Gonzalo Rodríguez (2002–04), (2017–20)
- (Argentina) Pablo Zabaleta (2002–05)
- (Argentina) Pablo Barrientos (2003–06), (2008–09), (2014–16)
- (Argentina) Ezequiel Lavezzi (2004–07)
- (Uruguay) Paolo Montero (2005–06)
- (Paraguay) José Cardozo (2005–06)
- (Argentina) Claudio Husaín (2006)
- (Argentina) Andrés D'Alessandro (2008)
- (Argentina) Diego Placente (2008), (2010–11)
- (Argentina) Gonzalo Bergessio (2008–09), (2016–17)
- (Paraguay) Néstor Ortigoza (2011–12), (2013–17), (2021–22)
- (Uruguay) Carlos Bueno (2012)
- (Argentina) Julio Buffarini (2012–16)
- (Argentina) Juan Mercier (2012–18)
- (Argentina) Ignacio Piatti (2012–14), (2020–present)
- (Argentina) Ángel Correa (2013–14)
- (Argentina) Emmanuel Más (2013–16)
- (Argentina) Sebastian Torrico (2013–present)
- (Colombia) Mario Yepes (2014–15)
- (Argentina) Fernando Belluschi (2016–20)
- (Chile) Paulo Díaz (2016–18)
- (Argentina) Tino Costa (2016–17)
- (Spain) Iker Muniain (2024-25)

== Managers ==
- (Hungary) Máximo Garay (1938)
- (Argentina) Guillermo Stábile (1939–40)
- (Hungary) György Orth (1944)
- (Peru) Victor Cuadros (1954)
- (Spain) Isidro Lángara (1955)
- (Argentina) Juan Carlos Lorenzo (1961–62)
- (Argentina) René Pontoni (1962)
- (Argentina) Juan Carlos Lorenzo (1965)
- (Brazil) Tim (1967–68)
- (Argentina) Pedro Dellacha (1969–70)
- (Argentina) Rogelio Domínguez (1971)
- (Argentina) Juan Carlos Lorenzo (1972)
- (Argentina) Luis Carniglia (1973)
- (Argentina) Osvaldo Zubeldía (1974)
- (Uruguay) Roberto Scarone (1975)
- (Argentina) Rogelio Domínguez (1977)
- (Argentina) Carlos Bilardo (1979)
- (Brazil) Delém (1980)
- (Argentina) Héctor Veira (1980)
- (Argentina) Victorio Cocco (1981)
- (Argentina) Juan Carlos Lorenzo (1981–82)
- (Argentina) José Yudica (1982)
- (Argentina) Héctor Veira (1983–84)
- (Argentina) Oscar López (1985)
- (Argentina) Juan Carlos Lorenzo (1985)
- (Socialist Federal Republic of Yugoslavia) Bora Milutinović (1987)
- (Argentina) Héctor Veira (1987–90)
- (Argentina) Roberto Saporiti (1989–90)
- (Argentina) Ricardo Rezza (1990–91)
- (Argentina) Fernando Areán (1991–92)
- (Argentina) Jorge Castelli (1992)
- (Argentina) Héctor Veira (1992–96)
- (Argentina) Carlos Aimar (1996)
- (Argentina) Jorge Castelli (1997–98)
- (Argentina) Alfio Basile (1998)
- (Argentina) Oscar Ruggeri (1998–01)
- (Chile) Manuel Pellegrini (1 January 2001 – 18 May 2002)
- (Argentina) Rubén Insúa (1 June 2002 – 5 July 2003)
- (Bolivia) Gustavo Quinteros (6 July 2003 – 29 July 2003)
- (Argentina) Néstor Gorosito (30 July 2003 – 25 August 2004)
- (Argentina) Gabriel Rodríguez (26 August 2004 – 2 September 2004)
- (Argentina) Héctor Veira (3 September 2004 – 22 April 2005)
- (Argentina) Gabriel Rodríguez (23 April 2005 – 30 June 2005)
- (Argentina) Gustavo Alfaro (1 July 2005 – 5 February 2006)
- (Argentina) Fernando Berón (interim) (6 February 2006 – 14 February 2006)
- (Argentina) Oscar Ruggeri (15 February 2006 – 20 December 2006)
- (Argentina) Ramón Díaz (1 January 2007 – 12 June 2008)
- (Argentina) Norberto Batista (7 June 2008 – 30 June 2008)
- (Argentina) Miguel Ángel Russo (1 July 2008 – 9 April 2009)
- (Argentina) Alberto Fanesi (interim) (9 April 2009 – 13 April 2009)
- (Argentina) Diego Simeone (20 April 2009 – 3 April 2010)
- (Argentina) Sebastián Méndez (interim) (7 April 2010 – 30 June 2010)
- (Argentina) Ramón Díaz (1 July 2010 – 24 April 2011)
- (Argentina) Omar Asad (12 May 2011 – 21 November 2011)
- (Argentina) Leonardo Carol Madelón (22 November 2011 – 1 April 2012)
- (Argentina) Ricardo Caruso Lombardi (4 April 2012 – 8 October 2012)
- (Argentina) (Spain) Juan Antonio Pizzi (9 October 2012 – 20 December 2013)
- (Argentina) Edgardo Bauza (26 December 2013 – 30 November 2015)
- (Argentina) Pablo Guede (4 January 2016 – 15 June 2016)
- (Uruguay) Diego Aguirre (22 June 2016 – 22 September 2017)
- (Argentina) Claudio Biaggio (22 September 2017 – 31 October 2018)
- (Argentina) Jorge Almirón (5 November 2018 – 13 May 2019)
- (Argentina) Diego Monarriz (interim) (13 May 2019 – 23 May 2019)
- (Argentina) (Spain) Juan Antonio Pizzi (1 July 2019 – 31 October 2019)
- (Argentina) Diego Monarriz (1 November 2019 – 23 February 2020)
- (Argentina) Hugo Tocalli (interim) (24 February 2020 – 15 March 2020)
- (Argentina) Mariano Soso (16 March 2020 – 11 January 2021)
- (Argentina) Diego Dabove (19 January 2021 – 9 May 2021)
- (Argentina) Leandro Romagnoli (interim) (10 May 2021 – 16 June 2021)
- (Uruguay) Paolo Montero (17 June 2021 – 21 October 2021)
- (Argentina) Diego Monarriz – (Argentina) José Di Leo (interim) (22 October 2021 – 29 October 2021)
- (Argentina) Diego Monarriz – (Argentina) José Di Leo (30 October 2021 – 29 December 2021)
- (Argentina) Pedro Troglio (6 January 2022 – 13 April 2022)
- (Argentina) Fernando Berón (interim) (14 April 2022 – 18 May 2022)
- (Argentina) Rubén Insúa (19 May 2022 – 11 April 2024)
- (Argentina) Leandro Romagnoli – (Argentina) Gonzalo Prósperi (interim) (12 April 2024 – 13 October 2024)
- (Argentina) Miguel Ángel Russo (17 October 2024 – 27 May 2025)
- (Argentina) Damián Ayude (4 June 2025 – present)

== Records ==
- The first Argentine football club to win two league titles in the same year, picking up the Metropolitano and Nacional championships in 1972.
- The first Argentine club to participate in the Copa Libertadores in 1960
- The only Argentine club to win the Copa Mercosur, in 2001.
- The first club to win the Copa Sudamericana in 2002.
- San Lorenzo is also considered one of the FIFA Classic Clubs.
- Largest victory (Primera División): 7–0 v Argentino de Banfield, on 9 Nov 1930.

== Honours ==
=== Senior titles ===
Keys

- Record
- ^{(s)} Shared record

Type	Competition	Titles	Winning years
National (League)	Primera División	15	1923 AAm, (Note: The Asociación Amateurs de Football (AAmF) was a rival association which organized its own championships from 1919 to 1926.) 1924 AAm, 1927, 1933 LAF, (Note: The Liga Argentina de Football was a dissident professional league that organised its own championships from 1931 to 1934, then merging with the official Association.) 1936 (Copa de Honor) (Note: In July 2013, The Argentine Football Association recognized the 1936 Copa de Honor won by San Lorenzo as a Primera División honour. The information was also added to AFA's website.) 1946, 1959, 1968 Metropolitano, 1972 Metropolitano, 1972 Nacional, 1974 Nacional, 1995 Clausura, 2001 Clausura, 2007 Clausura, 2013 Inicial
National (Cups)	Copa de la República	1^{(s)}	1943
National (Cups)	Supercopa Argentina	1	2015
International	Copa Libertadores (Note: CONMEBOL competition)	1	2014
International	Copa Sudamericana	1	2002
International	Copa Mercosur	1^{(s)}	2001
International	Copa Aldao (Note: Organised by AFA and AUF together)	1	1927
International	Copa Campeonato del Río de la Plata	1	1923

=== Other titles ===
Titles won in lower divisions:

- Primera División B (2): 1914 (Note: In 1914, the Primera B (named "Segunda División" by then) was actually the third level of Argentine football league system after División Intermedia, established in 1911.), 1982

=== Friendly ===
Not recognized as official titles by the Argentine Football Association.

- Copa San Martín de Tours (Note: The matches of this Cup belonged to the league or National championship. From 1986 to 1996 it was played in the most important match between two Buenos Aireans teams.) (1): 1994
- Copa Jorge Newbery (1): 1964
- Copa Independencia: 1991

== Women ==
The women's team has won the national championship, Campeonato de Fútbol Femenino in 2008/09 and 2015. They finished fourth of five in the group stage of the 2009 Copa Libertadores Femenina.

== Basketball ==
San Lorenzo has played basketball since 1930 when the club affiliated to the association. On 26 April 1985, San Lorenzo played the opening game of the recently created Liga Nacional de Básquetbol (LNB), facing Argentino de Firmat at Obras Sanitarias venue.

The team returned to LNB in 2015.
