= Rodolfo Fischer =

Argentine footballer (1944–2020)

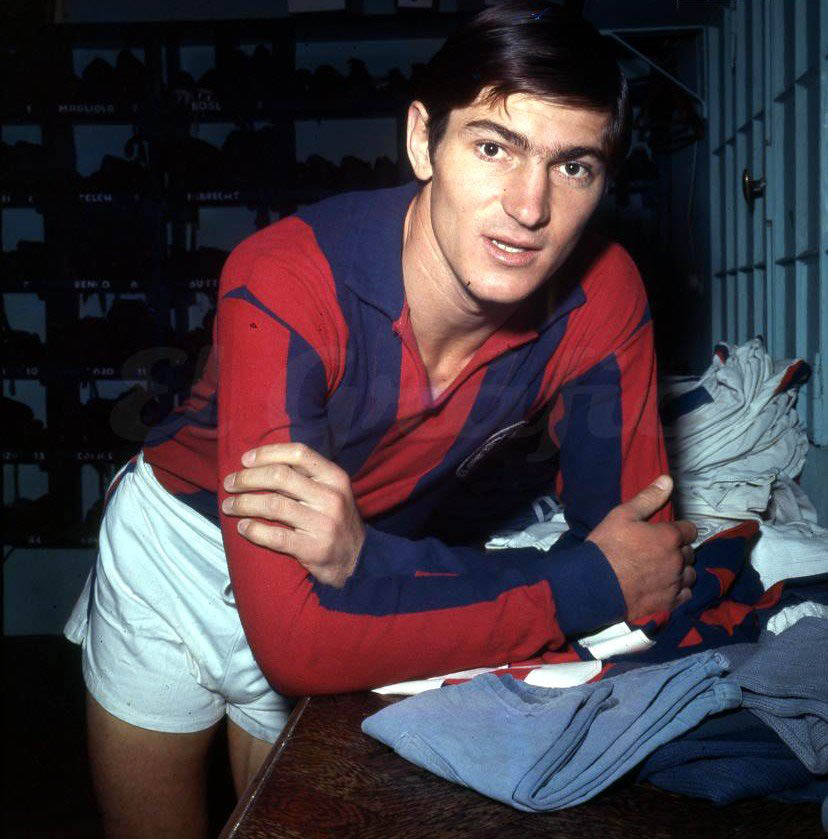
- Fischer while playing for San Lorenzo

Personal information
- Full name: Rodolfo José Fischer Eichler
- Date of birth: 2 April 1944
- Place of birth: Oberá, Argentina
- Date of death: 16 October 2020 (aged 76)
- Position: Striker

Senior career*
Years	Team	Apps	(Gls)
1965–1972	San Lorenzo	271 (total)	(141)
1972–1976	Botafogo FR		
1976	EC Vitória		
1977–1978	San Lorenzo	(s. above)	
1979	Once Caldas	40	(10)
1980	Sarmiento (J)		
1981	Sportivo Belgrano		

International career
1967–1972	Argentina	35	(12)
- * Club domestic league appearances and goals

Rodolfo José Fischer Eichler, nicknamed Lobo (2 April 1944 – 16 October 2020) was an Argentine international association football player of German-Brazilian descent. His tenacity awarded the tall attacker with the nickname El Lobo, the "Wolf". With CA San Lorenzo de Almagro in Buenos Aires he won three championships and he remained one of the foremost strikers in the club's history. Among others, he also played for Botafogo FR in Brazil and CD Once Caldas in Colombia.

== Biography ==
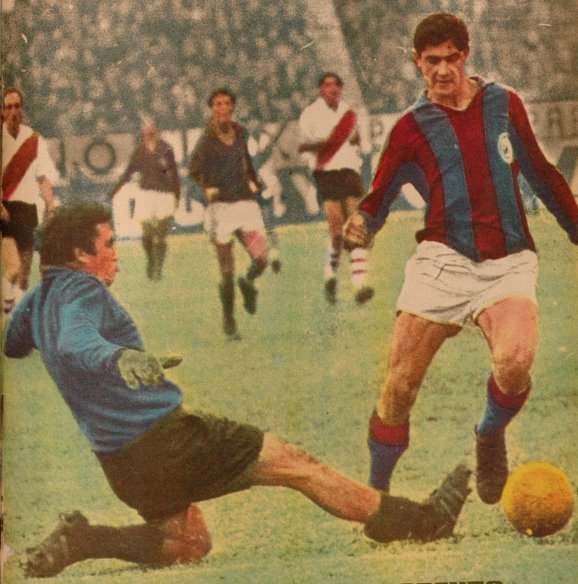
Fischer scoring against River Plate in 1967

Fischer was born on 2 April 1944 (in Oberá, Province Misiones). He joined in 1963 the youth of the top club CA San Lorenzo de Almagro in the Argentine capital Buenos Aires. From 1965 he played in the first team of the club with which he won in 1968 under the Brazilian manager Elba de Pádua Lima "Tim" undefeated the Campeonato Metropolitano, the Metropolitan Championship – the first undefeated championship of any club in the history of professional football in Argentina. In 1969, he was top scorer of the National championship. In 1972, he won both, Metropolitan and National championships with San Lorenzo. One of his personal highlights was his three goals he contributed to a 4–0 win over River Plate in April 1972.

From 1967 onward he also played 35 matches for the Argentina national team for which he scored 12 goals. His last match for Argentina was in July 1972 in the Maracanã in Rio de Janeiro at the Taça Independência, the Brazilian Independence Cup, where Argentina finished fourth. At this tournament he was, together with the Portuguese Joaquim Dinis number two in the scorer list.

After this tournament he stayed in Rio de Janeiro and played for four years for Botafogo FR, which paid one million Brazilian cruzeiros for him. Most prominent team member there was the World Cup 1970 winning player Jairzinho, and also Mário Zagallo coach of Brazil 1970 worked in Botafogo for some time in that period. In 1976 Rodolfo Fischer moved to north-eastern Brazil, where he joined EC Vitória in Salvador da Bahia, playing under coach Tim once more.

From 1977 to 1978 he returned to Argentina and played again for San Lorenzo, for which he scored altogether 141 goals in 271 league matches, which makes him fourth best scorer in the club's history.

In 1979 he went abroad once more to play for CD Once Caldas in Manizales, Colombia, for which he scored 11 goals in 40 league matches. In the years 1980 and 1981 he saw out his career back in Argentina with club Sarmiento of Junín in the Buenos Aires Province and Sportivo Belgrano in Córdoba Province, both teams in the lower leagues.

Rodolfo Fisher lived on a farm in the interior of Argentina. On 16 October 2020, Fischer died, aged 76.

== Titles ==
San Lorenzo

- Primera División: 1968 Metropolitano, 1972 Metropolitano, 1972 Nacional
- Primera División Top Scorer: 1969 Nacional (14 goals)

Sarmiento

- Primera B: 1980
