= Enrique Chazarreta =

Argentine footballer (1947–2021)

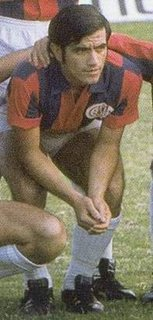
- Chazarreta at San Lorenzo

Personal information
- Full name: Enrique Salvador Chazarreta
- Date of birth: July 29, 1947
- Place of birth: Coronel Du Graty, Chaco, Argentina
- Date of death: March 24, 2021 (aged 73)
- Height: 1.72 m (5 ft 8 in)
- Position: Attacking midfielder

Senior career*
Years	Team	Apps	(Gls)
1969	→ Argentinos Juniors (loan)	37	(2)
1970–1975	San Lorenzo	184	(30)
1975–1977	Avignon	66	(9)
1978–1979	Olympique Alès	59	(11)
1980–1981	Gimnasia La Plata	62	(2)
1982	Deportivo Morón		

International career
1973–1974	Argentina	11	(0)
- * Club domestic league appearances and goals as of March 2008

Enrique Salvador Chazarreta (29 July 1947 in Coronel Du Graty, Chaco – 24 March 2021) was an Argentine football midfielder who played for the Argentina national team.

Chazarreta was signed by San Lorenzo in the late 1960s. He was loaned to Argentinos Juniors in 1969 before returning to San Lorenzo in 1970. He was part of three championship winning squads in the 1970s.

Chazarreta made his Argentina debut on 6 February 1973 in a game against Mexico. He was selected to play in the 1974 FIFA World Cup, where he made one appearance before Argentina were eliminated.

In 1975 Chazarreta moved to France, where he played for Avignon and then Olympique Alès.

In 1980, he returned to Argentina, where he played in the Argentine 2nd division for Gimnasia y Esgrima de La Plata and finally Deportivo Morón.

== Honours ==
San Lorenzo

- Argentine Primera: Metropolitano 1972, Nacional 1972, Nacional 1974
