= Agustín Irusta =

Argentine footballer

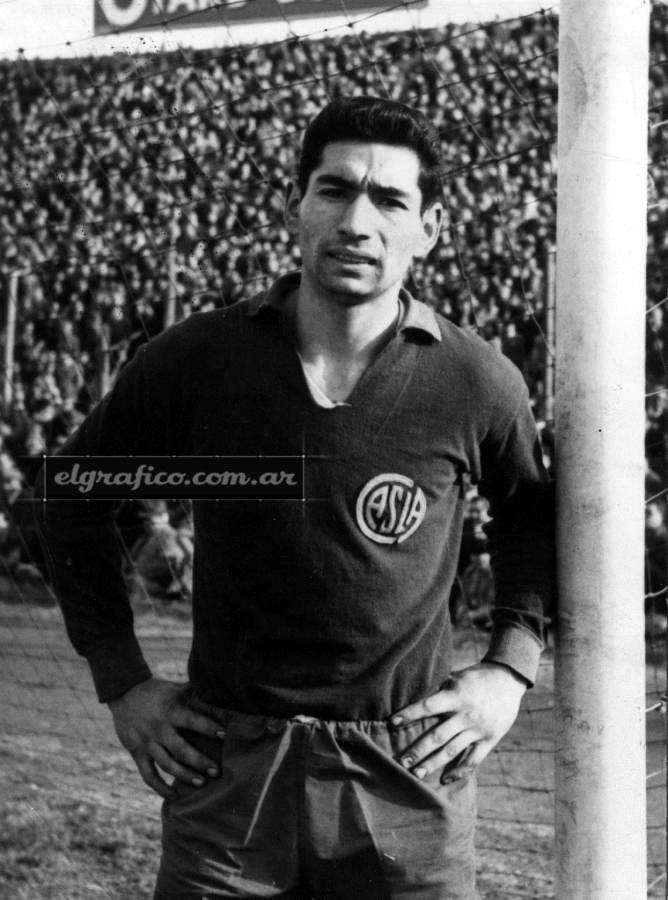
- Irusta in 1964

Personal information
- Full name: Agustín Ernesto Irusta
- Date of birth: July 19, 1942 (age 84)
- Place of birth: Villa María, Cordoba, Argentina
- Position: Goalkeeper

Senior career*
Years	Team	Apps	(Gls)
1963–1976	San Lorenzo	257	(0)
1977–1978	Unión de Santa Fe	13	(0)

International career
	Argentina	?	(0)
- * Club domestic league appearances and goals as of 20:43, 20 April 2009 (UTC)

Agustín Ernesto Irusta (born 19 July 1942) is a former Argentine football goalkeeper who played most of his career for San Lorenzo de Almagro.

Irusta was born in Villa María, Cordoba. He made his professional debut for San Lorenzo on 23 June 1963 against Atlanta. He went on to make 257 league appearances for the club, which is the club record for a goalkeeper, and the fifth-highest tally of appearances in any position.

Irusta also played for the Argentina national team.

Irusta was one of five players to win four league titles with San Lorenzo between 1968 and 1974, the others being Sergio Villar, Carlos Veglio, Victorio Cocco and Roberto Telch.

In 1977 Irusta joined Unión de Santa Fe where he made a further 13 appearances before his retirement in 1978.

== Titles ==
Season	Team	Title
1968 Metropolitano	San Lorenzo	Primera División Argentina
1972 Metropolitano	San Lorenzo	Primera División Argentina
1972 Nacional	San Lorenzo	Primera División Argentina
1974 Nacional	San Lorenzo	Primera División Argentina
