= Carlos Morete =

Argentine footballer

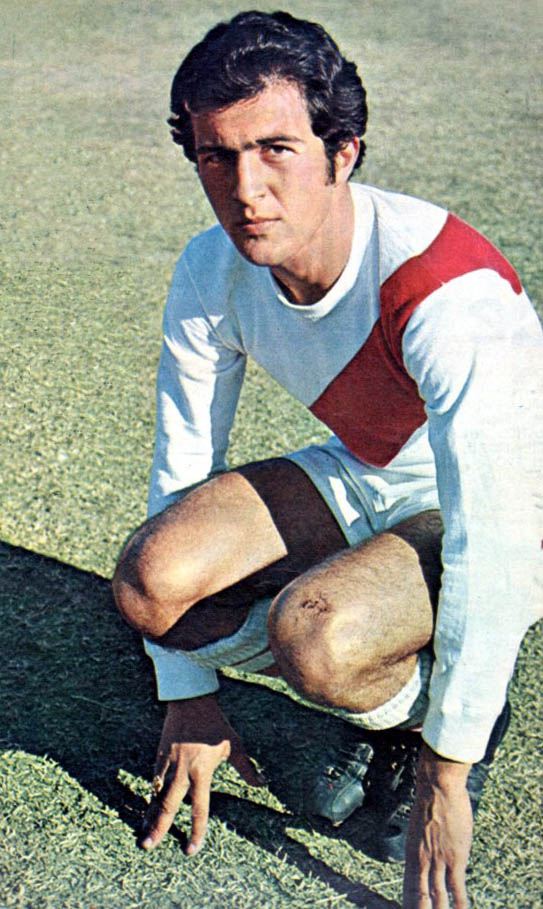
- Morete with River Plate, 1970

Personal information
- Full name: Carlos Manuel Morete Markov
- Date of birth: 14 January 1952 (age 74)
- Place of birth: Munro, Argentina
- Position: Striker

Youth career
- River Plate

Senior career*
Years	Team	Apps	(Gls)
1970–1975	River Plate	195	(103)
1975–1980	UD Las Palmas	171	(86)
1980–1981	Sevilla FC	19	(6)
1981	Boca Juniors	18	(3)
1982	Talleres	20	(20)
1982–1983	Independiente	59	(26)
1984–1986	Argentinos Juniors	32	(5)

International career
?	Argentina	2	(1)
- * Club domestic league appearances and goals as of May 2007

Carlos Manuel Morete Markov (born 14 January 1952), commonly known as Carlos Morete, is an Argentine former professional football striker He is one of the few players to have played for and won titles with Argentina's three biggest clubs: River Plate, Boca Juniors and Independiente. He was part of 5 championship winning teams in Argentina as well as being the topscorer in three Argentine championships. He scored 245 top goals in the Argentine Primera División and La Liga in Spain making him one of the top marksmen in the history of football.

== Career ==
Morete was born in the city of Munro in Greater Buenos Aires, starting his career at the age of 18 with River Plate, he was twice topscorer in Nacional 1972 and in Metropolitano 1974 and won his first league title with River in Metropolitano 1975.

After winning the title with River, Morete was sold to Spanish side UD Las Palmas where he played 147 games in 5 seasons, scoring 79 league goals.

After a short spell with Sevilla FC Morete returned to Argentina to play for River's hated rivals; Boca Juniors where he won his second league title, the Metropolitano 1981. After a short spell in Talleres, he went to Independiente, where he hit a remarkable 20 goals in 20 games during Metropolitano 1982 to become topscorer in the Argentine Primera for the third time. After two back-to-back defeats at the hands of Estudiantes de La Plata, Morete's Independiente won Metropolitano 1983. The scorer was transferred to Argentinos Juniors where he helped this previously unsuccessful team to win two league championships; Met 1984 and Nacional 1985 and to further success in the Copa Libertadores 1985.

Morete only ever made 2 appearances for Argentina scoring one goal.

== Honours ==
=== Club ===
River Plate

- Primera Division Argentina: 1975 Metropolitano

Boca Juniors

- Primera Division Argentina: 1981 Metropolitano

Independiente

- Primera Division Argentina: 1983 Metropolitano

Argentinos Juniors

- Primera Division Argentina: 1984 Metropolitano, 1985 Nacional
- Copa Libertadores: 1985

=== Individual ===
- Primera División Argentina top scorer: 1972 Nactional, 1974 Metropolitano, 1982 Metropolitano
