= Sergio Villar =

Uruguayan footballer (born 1944)

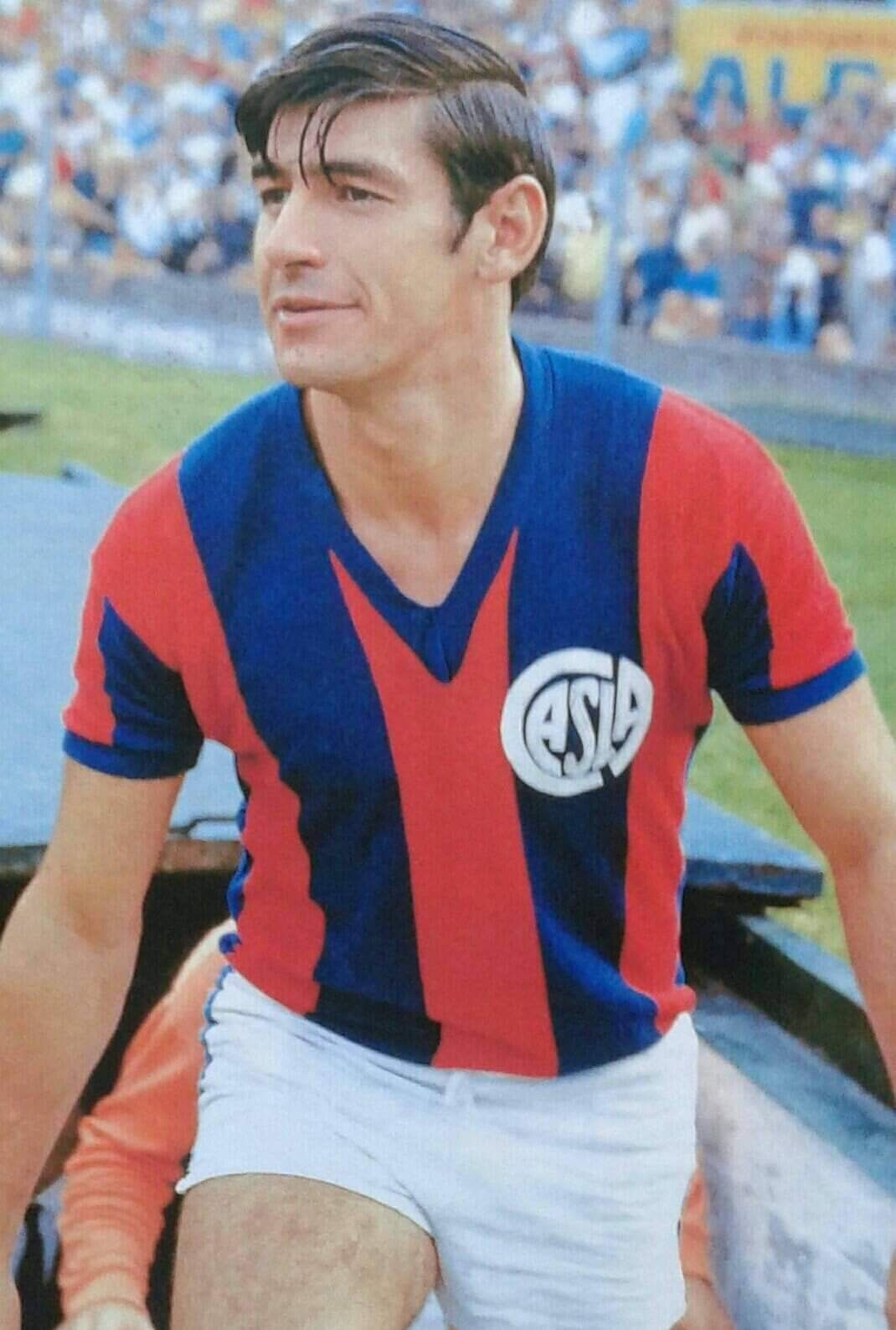

Personal information
- Full name: Sergio Bismarck Villar
- Date of birth: January 5, 1944 (age 82)
- Place of birth: Montevideo, Uruguay
- Position: Left-back

Senior career*
| Years | Team | Apps | (Gls) |
| ? | Sp. Cerrito | ? | (?) |
| ? | C.A. Canillitas | ? | (?) |
| ? | Defensor | ? | (?) |
| 1968–1981 | San Lorenzo | 446 | (6) |
| 1982 | All Boys | 36 | (0) |
- * Club domestic league appearances and goals as of 21 October 2007

Sergio Bismarck Villar (born 5 January 1944) is a Uruguayan former footballer who played as a left back. He played most of his career for San Lorenzo de Almagro in Argentina.

Villar started his career in Uruguay where he played for Club Sportivo Cerrito, C.A. Canillitas and Defensor S.C.

In 1968 Villar joined San Lorenzo and in his first year with the club they won the Metropolitano championship, and became the first team in the professional era of Argentine football to complete a season without losing a game.

In 1972 Villar was part of the San Lorenzo team that won both of the Argentine league titles, this time they completed the Nacional championship without losing a single game.

Villar won his fourth title with San Lorenzo in 1974 when the club won the Nacional championship. Villar is one of only five players to have won four league championships with San Lorenzo, the others being Roberto Telch, Victorio Cocco, Carlos Veglio and Agustín Irusta.

Villar played his last game for San Lorenzo in 1981, by the end of his time with the club he had played 446 games, scoring 6 goals. Villar is top of the San Lorenzo all-time appearances list.

Villar had a short spell with All Boys in 1982, after which he retired.

== Titles ==
| Season | Team | Title |
|---|---|---|
| 1968 Metropolitano | San Lorenzo | Primera División Argentina |
| 1972 Metropolitano | San Lorenzo | Primera División Argentina |
| 1972 Nacional | San Lorenzo | Primera División Argentina |
| 1974 Nacional | San Lorenzo | Primera División Argentina |
