= Victorio Cocco =

Argentine footballer and manager

Personal information
- Full name: Victorio Nicolás Cocco
- Date of birth: March 23, 1946 (age 80)
- Place of birth: Santa Fe, Argentina
- Position: Central midfielder

Senior career*
Years	Team	Apps	(Gls)
1964–1967	Unión de Santa Fe	136	(11)
1968–1974	San Lorenzo	194	(49)
1975	Deportivo La Coruña	21	(7)
1976	River Plate	14	(1)
1977	Atlanta	23	(4)
1978	Boca Juniors	12	(2)
1979	Cúcuta	?	(?)

International career
1968–1974	Argentina	6	(1)

Managerial career
- 1977: Atlanta
- 1981: San Lorenzo
- 1982: Atlanta
- 1983: Racing (C)
- 1984–1985: Belgrano (C)
- 1985–1986: Atlanta
- 1987: Colón
- 1989: Tigre
- 1992–1993: Belgrano (C)
- 1994: Gimnasia y Tiro
- * Club domestic league appearances and goals as of 01 September 2024

Victorio Nicolás Cocco (born 23 March 1946 in Santa Fe, Argentina) is a former Argentine footballer. He played for several clubs in Argentina, Spain, and Colombia and represented the Argentina national football team.

== Personal life ==
Three marriages. Four children. Two from their first marriage: Victorio Jr and Verónica, one from his second marriage: Victoria, and another from his third marriage, Aaron.

== Playing career ==
Cocco made his professional debut playing for Unión de Santa Fe in the Argentine 2nd division in 1964. He was part of the team that won the championship and promotion to the Primera in 1966. Cocco played one season with Unión in the Primera in 1967.

Cocco was signed by San Lorenzo in 1968 and later that year he won his first Primera Division title with the club. San Lorenzo won the Metropolitano without losing a single game, making them the first unbeaten champions in the professional era of Argentine football.

In 1972 Cocco was part of the San Lorenzo team that won both of the Argentine league titles, this time they completed the Nacional championship without losing a game.

Cocco won his fourth title with San Lorenzo in 1974, the club won the Nacional championship. Cocco is one of only five players to have won four league championships with San Lorenzo, the others being Sergio Villar, Carlos Veglio, Roberto Telch and Agustín Irusta.

By the time Cocco left San Lorenzo in 1974 he had played 202 games for the club, scoring 49 goals.

In 1975 Cocco played for Deportivo La Coruña in Spain, but he returned to Argentina in 1976 to play for River Plate. In 1977, he joined Club Atlético Atlanta where he got his first taste of management as a player manager in the last few games of the Metropolitano 1977.

Cocco had a short spell with Boca Juniors in 1978 alongside former San Lorenzo team-mate Carlos Veglio. He made 12 appearances for the club, and joined the select band of players to have played for Boca Juniors and River Plate.

Cocco played out his career in Colombia with Cúcuta Deportivo in 1979.

== Titles as a player ==
Season	Team	Title
1966	Unión de Santa Fe	Argentine 2nd division
1968 Metropolitano	San Lorenzo	Primera División Argentina
1972 Metropolitano	San Lorenzo	Primera División Argentina
1972 Nacional	San Lorenzo	Primera División Argentina
1974 Nacional	San Lorenzo	Primera División Argentina

== Managerial career ==
Cocco has held a number of managerial positions including San Lorenzo (twice), Atlanta (3 times), Belgrano de Córdoba (twice), Racing de Córdoba, Colón de Santa Fe, Club Atlético Tigre and Gimnasia y Tiro de Salta. He has also held a number of other official positions in Argentine football.
