= Oscar Calics =

Argentine footballer (1939–2025)

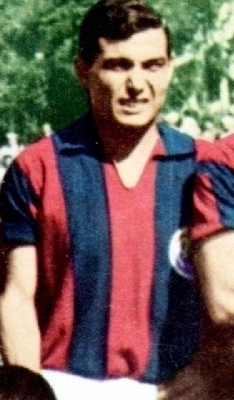

Personal information
- Full name: Oscar Osvaldo Calics
- Date of birth: 18 November 1939
- Place of birth: Buenos Aires, Argentina
- Date of death: 16 September 2025 (aged 85)
- Position: Midfielder

Senior career*
Years	Team	Apps	(Gls)
1958–1965	Banfield		
1966–1970	San Lorenzo	113	(2)
1971–1973	Atlético Nacional	120	(0)

International career
1966–1967	Argentina	6	(0)
- * Club domestic league appearances and goals

Oscar Osvaldo Calics (18 November 1939 – 16 September 2025) was an Argentine football midfielder who played for Argentina in the 1966 FIFA World Cup. He also played for Banfield and San Lorenzo. He was manager in San Lorenzo and in Talleres de Remedios de Escalada. Calics died on 16 September 2025, at the age of 85.
