= Antonio Rosl =

Argentine footballer

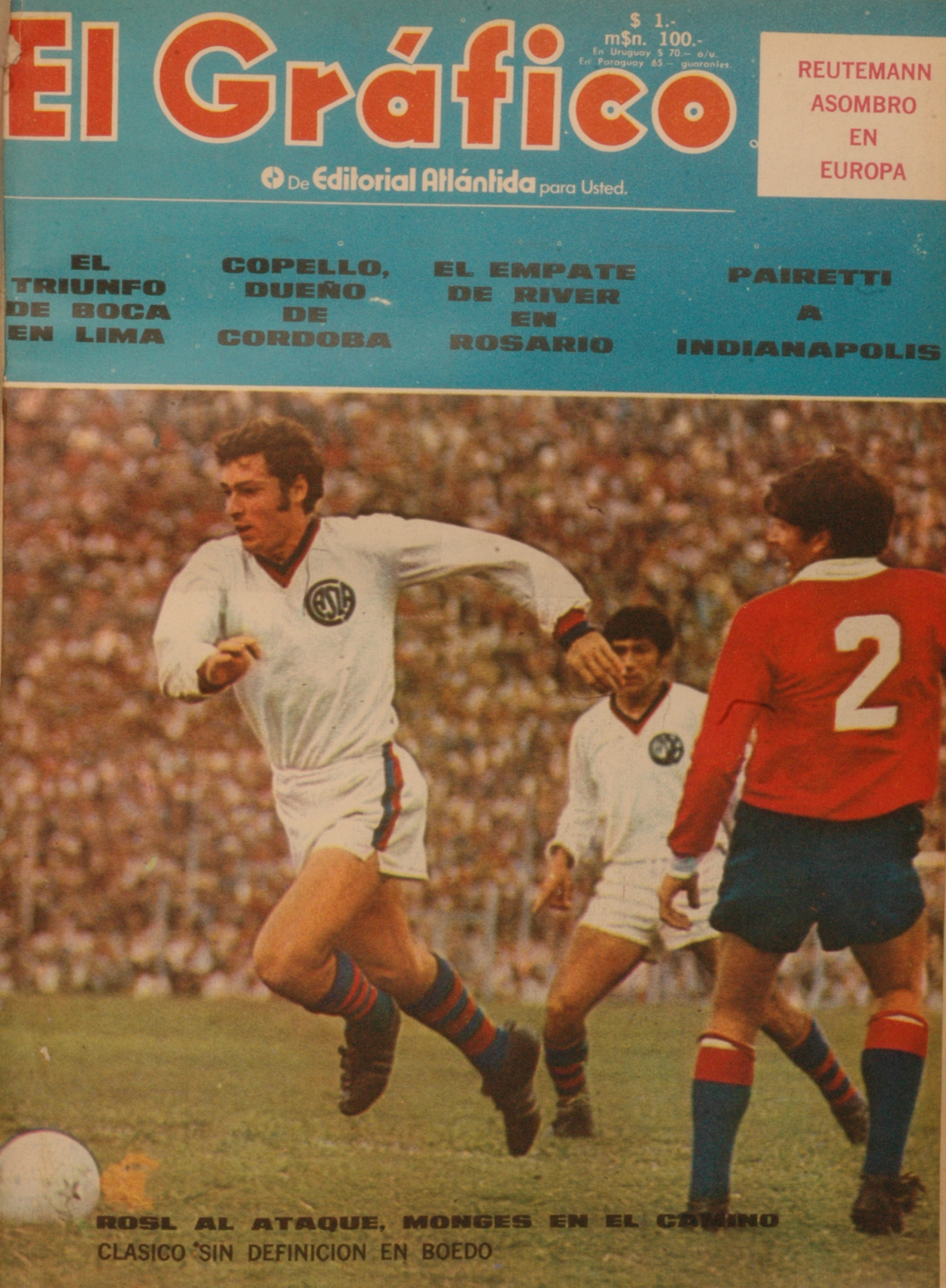

Personal information
- Full name: Antonio Rosl
- Date of birth: 20 March 1944 (age 82)
- Place of birth: La Plata, Buenos Aires, Argentina
- Position: Midfielder

Senior career*
Years	Team	Apps	(Gls)
1963–1967	Gimnasia y Esgrima La Plata	136	(4)
1968–1973	San Lorenzo	201	(7)
1974–1976	Gimnasia y Esgrima La Plata	119	(5)

International career
1967–1973	Argentina	13	(0)
- * Club domestic league appearances and goals as of January 2016

Antonio Rosl (born 21 March 1944) is a former Argentine footballer.

== Playing career ==
Born in La Plata, Rosl played club football for Club Atlético San Lorenzo de Almagro in Argentina where he was part of the team that famously went unbeaten for the whole of the 1972 Nacional championship.

In 1976, he retires in Gimnasia y Esgrima La Plata.

== Titles ==
Season	Club	Title
1968 Metropolitano	San Lorenzo	Primera Division Argentina
1972 Metropolitano	San Lorenzo	Primera Division Argentina
1972 Nacional	San Lorenzo	Primera Division Argentina
