= Roberto Telch =

Argentine footballer

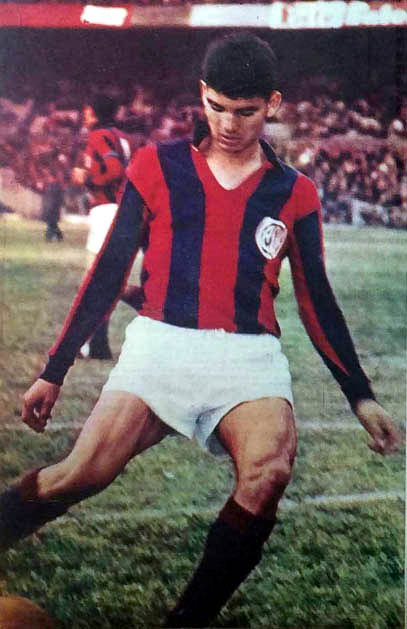
- Telch in 1964

Personal information
- Full name: Roberto Marcelo Telch
- Date of birth: 6 November 1943
- Place of birth: San Vicente, Córdoba, Argentina
- Date of death: 12 October 2014 (aged 70)
- Place of death: Buenos Aires
- Height: 1.78 m (5 ft 10 in)
- Position: Central midfielder

Senior career*
| Years | Team | Apps | (Gls) |
| 1962–1975 | San Lorenzo | 413 | (25) |
| 1976–1979 | Unión SF | 189 | (2) |
| 1980 | Colón | 29 | (0) |
| Total | | 631 | (27) |

International career
| 1964–1974 | Argentina | 24 | (2) |
- * Club domestic league appearances and goals as of 19 October 2007

Roberto "Oveja" Telch (6 November 1943 – 12 October 2014) was an Argentine footballer who played as a midfielder. He was born in San Vicente, Córdoba, and won four league championships with San Lorenzo in Argentina and represented the Argentina national football team at the 1974 FIFA World Cup. He died in Buenos Aires of a heart attack.

== Playing career ==
Telch started his professional career in a 3–2 win against Ferro Carril Oeste on 9 September 1962. He was first selected to play for the Argentina national team in 1964 when he played in the 1964 Cup of Nations.

In 1968 Telch won his first title with San Lorenzo, winning the Metropolitano, and becoming the first team in the professional era of Argentine football to complete a season without losing a game.

In 1972 Telch was part of the San Lorenzo team that won both of the Argentine league titles, this time they completed the Nacional championship without losing a game.

Telch won his fourth title with San Lorenzo in 1974, the club won the Nacional championship. Telch is one of only five players to have won four league championships with San Lorenzo, the others being Sergio Villar, Victorio Cocco, Carlos Veglio and Agustín Irusta.

In 1974 Telch played for the Argentina national team at the 1974 World Cup.

At the end of the 1975 season, Telch left San Lorenzo, by that time he had played 413 games for the club, scoring 25 goals. He has the second most appearances for the club behind Sergio Villar (446).

Telch played for Unión de Santa Fe between 1976 and 1979, he played 129 games for the club scoring 2 goals. In 1978 Unión reached the final of the Nacional but lost on aggregate to River Plate.

In 1980 Telch joined Colón de Santa Fe where he played one last season, he retired at the end of the 1980 season with a total of 630 appearances in the Argentine Primera, a record only surpassed by Hugo Gatti and Ricardo Bochini.

== Coaching career ==
Telch managed several teams in the lower leagues of Argentine football. He also worked for many years with the youth teams at San Lorenzo.

== Honours ==
San Lorenzo

- Primera División Argentina: 1968 Metropolitano, 1972 Metropolitano, 1972 Nacional, 1974 Nacional
- Copa Argentina Final Canceled: 1970

Argentina

- Taça das Nações: 1964
