= Metropolitano championship =

Football tournament in Argentina

Campeonato Metropolitano
- Organiser(s): AFA
- Founded: 1967
- Abolished: 1984; 42 years ago
- Region: Argentina
- Teams: 19 (1984)
- Qualifier for: Copa Libertadores
- Related competitions: Nacional
- Most championships: River Plate (4 titles)

The Metropolitano championship ("Campeonato Metropolitano") was an Argentine football tournament which existed between 1967 and 1984. The Metropolitano formed one half of the Primera División, taking place in the first half of the year, while the Nacional championship ("Campeonato Nacional") took place in the 2nd half of the year. This arrangement lasted until 1982 when they were reversed. The Metropolitano and Nacional were abandoned to make way for European style seasons beginning in 1985–1986.

The Metropolitano utilized a number of different formats, including the basic league table, 2 groups qualifying to semi-finals. The number of participants varied between a low of 18 (1972, 1973 and 1981) to a high of 23 (1977)

== Format ==
Initially, the tournament was held in the first half of the year. Until 1969, it was played in 2 zones, followed by the direct elimination format to define the champion. The best clubs qualified for the Campeonato Nacional, a complementary first division tournament held in the second semester. The following clubs qualified for the Torneo Promocional. While the worst clubs competed in a reclassification tournament with the best teams in the Primera División B.

Starting in 1971, the tournament was played at least in the first 8 months of the year. In most editions, all-against-all system was used in two rounds. Starting in 1973, the champion qualified for the Copa Libertadores.

Starting in 1980, the tournament was held after the Campeonato Nacional.

== List of Champions ==
Notes

- – single match in neutral venue
- – final score on goal difference

Ed.	PD season	Champion	Runner-up	First leg / single match		Second leg		Aggr.
Ed.	PD season	Champion	Runner-up	Res.	Venue	Res.	Venue	Aggr.
1	1967	Estudiantes (LP) (1)	Racing	3–0	Estadio Gasómetro	–		
2	1968	San Lorenzo (1)	Estudiantes (LP)	2–1 (a.e.t.)	Monumental	–		
3	1969	Chacarita Juniors (1)	River Plate	4–1	Estadio Racing	–		
4	1970	Independiente (1)	River Plate	– (Note: Defined on points.)				
5	1971	Independiente (2)	Vélez Sársfield	–				
6	1972	San Lorenzo (2)	Racing	–				
7	1973	Huracán (1)	Boca Juniors	–				
8	1974	Newell's Old Boys (1)	Rosario Central	–				
9	1975	River Plate (1)	Huracán	–				
10	1976	Boca Juniors (1)	Huracán	–				
11	1977	River Plate (2)	Independiente	–				
12	1978	Quilmes (1)	Boca Juniors	–				
13	1979	River Plate (3)	Vélez Sársfield	2–0	Estadio Vélez	5–1	Monumental	7–1
14	1980	River Plate (4)	Argentinos Juniors	–				
15	1981	Boca Juniors (2)	Ferro Carril Oeste	–				
16	1982	Estudiantes (LP) (2)	Independiente	–				
17	1983	Independiente (3)	San Lorenzo	–				
18	1984	Argentinos Juniors (1)	Ferro Carril Oeste	–				

== Titles by club ==
Club	Titles	Years won
River Plate	4	1975, 1977, 1979, 1980
Independiente	3	1970, 1971, 1983
Estudiantes (LP)	2	1967, 1982
San Lorenzo	2	1968, 1972
Boca Juniors	2	1976, 1981
Chacarita Juniors	1	1969
Huracán	1	1973
Newell's Old Boys	1	1974
Quilmes	1	1978
Argentinos Juniors	1	1984

== Records ==
- River Plate hold the most titles with four, and are the only team to have won two consecutive Metropolitano championships in 1979 and 1980.
- Vélez Sársfield are the most successful team never to win the Metropolitano, with 2 second places, a third place and a semi-final place.
- Diego Maradona was topscorer in the Metropolitano three times (1978, 1979, 1980)
- The only other player to be topscorer on more than one occasion was Carlos Manuel Morete (1974, 1982)

== See also ==
- Argentine Primera División
- Nacional championship
- Apertura and Clausura
- Football in Argentina
