= 1944 Copa Adrián Escobar final =

1944 Copa Adrián C. Escobar Final
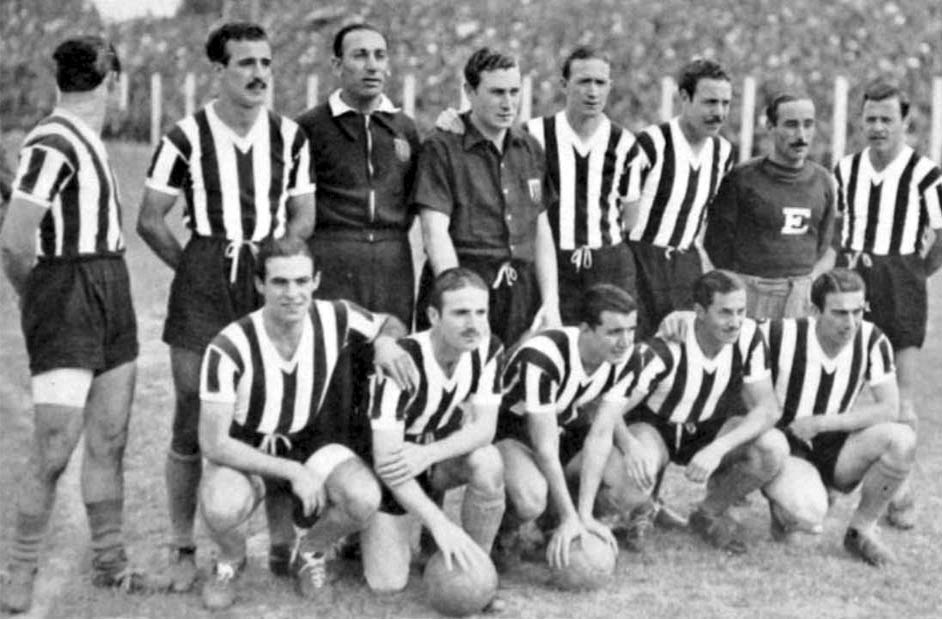
- A team of Estudiantes LP in 1944
- Event: Copa Adrián C. Escobar
Estudiantes (LP)	San Lorenzo
1	0
- Date: 2 December 1944
- Venue: San Lorenzo Stadium
- Referee: J.J. Alvarez

The 1944 Copa Adrián C. Escober Final was the final that decided the winner of the 5th. edition of Copa Adrián C. Escobar, an Argentine domestic cup organised by the Argentine Football Association. The match was contested by Estudiantes de La Plata and San Lorenzo.

The final was held in San Lorenzo Stadium on 2 December 1944. Estudiantes defeat San Lorenzo 1–0, winning their first Copa Escobar trophy.

== Qualified teams ==
Team	Previous finals app.
Estudiantes (LP)	(none)
San Lorenzo	1939

== Overview ==
This edition was contested by the seven best placed teams of the 1944 Primera División season. Boca Juniors, as current champion, advanced directly to semifinals where they lost to San Lorenzo. The matches lasted 40 minutes, with all of them being held in San Lorenzo Stadium.

In quarter finals, Huracán beat Racing 2–1, while San Lorenzo eliminated Independiente 2–0 and then Boca Juniors in semifinals. On the other hand, Estudiantes LP eliminated River Plate (4–3 on corner kicks awarded), then beating Huracán in semifinals.

== Road to the final ==
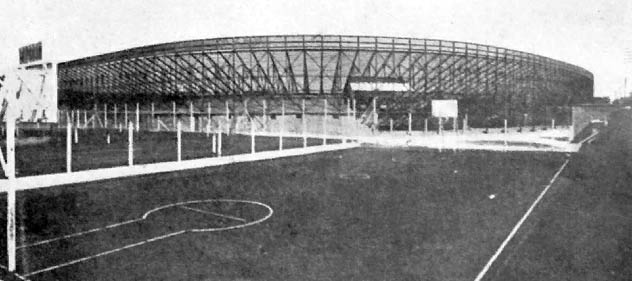
San Lorenzo Stadium was the venue for the final

Note: all the matches were played at San Lorenzo Stadium

Estudiantes (LP)		Round	San Lorenzo	
Opponent	Result	Group stage	Opponent	Result
River Plate	0–0 (4–3, c)	Quarter final	Independiente	1–0
Huracán	2–1	Semifinal	Boca Juniors	2–0

== Match details ==
1944 Copa Adrián C. Escobar Final
2 December 1944
Final

Estudiantes (LP)	1–0	San Lorenzo
Infante 4'	Report 1 Report 2 (players)

San Lorenzo Stadium, Buenos Aires
Referee: J.J. Alvarez

Estudiantes (LP)	San Lorenzo

GK	(Argentina) Gabriel Ogando
DF	(Argentina) Eduardo Rodríguez
DF	(Argentina) Nicolás Palma
MF	(Argentina) Luis Villa
MF	(Argentina) Saúl Ongaro
MF	(Argentina) Walter Garcerón
FW	(Argentina) Roberto Martín
FW	(Argentina) Juan J. Negri
FW	(Argentina) Ricardo Infante
FW	(Argentina) Fortunato Desagastizábal
FW	(Argentina) Manuel Pellegrina
Manager:
(Argentina) Alberto Viola

GK	(Argentina) Mierko Blazina
DF	(Spain) Ángel Zubieta
DF	(Argentina) Eduardo Crespi
MF	(Argentina) Isidro D'Adario
MF	(Argentina) Héctor Barchielli
MF	(Argentina) Bartolomé Colombo
FW	(Argentina) Francisco Antuña
FW	(Argentina) Mario Fernández
FW	(Argentina) Tomás Etchepare
FW	(Argentina) Rinaldo Martino
FW	(Argentina) Jorge Enrico
Manager:
(Argentina) Jorge Orth
