= Herminio Masantonio =

Argentine footballer (1910–1956)

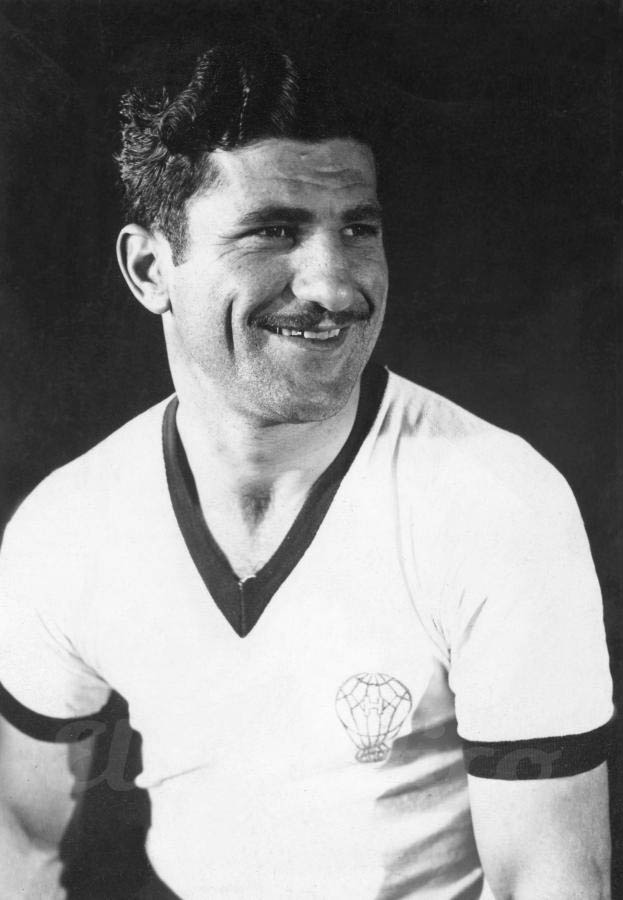
- Masantonio during his time in Huracán

Personal information
- Date of birth: 5 August 1910
- Place of birth: Ensenada, Argentina
- Date of death: 11 September 1956 (aged 46)
- Position: Striker

Youth career
- Sportivo Villa Albino

Senior career*
Years	Team	Apps	(Gls)
1931–1943, 1945	Huracán	349	(254)
1943	Defensor	11	(3)
1944	Banfield	9	(2)

International career
1935–1942	Argentina	19	(21)
- * Club domestic league appearances and goals as of October 2007

Herminio Masantonio (5 August 1910 – 11 September 1956) was an Argentine football centre-forward. He played most of his career for Huracán and represented Argentina at international level.

Masantonio is one of Huracán's legends, being the all-time top scorer of the club. He is ranked third in the list of Argentine Primera División top scorers with 253 goals in 358 matches. Despite these marks, Masantonio was never the top scorer of an individual season and did not win any official title with Huracán.

== Biography ==
Born in Ensenada in 1910, Masantonio started his career in Villa Albino Sportivo, that was affiliated to La Plata football league, where he debuted in the fourth division in 1926. Three years later, Masantonio moved to Club Platense of the same league, where he began achieving greater scores.

Apart from football, Masantonio was a boxing enthusiast and wished to make a career in the sport. However, Lieutenant Tomás Ducó, member of C.A. Huracán (he would be later president of club) had been informed about Masantonio's potential for football so he convinced him to play for the club. Masantonio signed his first contract for Huracán, starting his career at the very dawn of the professional era of Argentine football in 1931. He scored two goals to Quilmes in his debut for Huracán, which helped to defeat the Cervecero 5–1.

That evening (his debut with Huracán) I scored the most formidable goal of my life. I took the ball in the center of the field, dribbled the left half, then the centrehalf, and even the two backs, shooting so strong that not only the goalkeeper could not see the trajectory of the ball but many people only heard a huge strike on one of the goal posts, and nothing else.

— Masantonio about one of the goals he scored in his professional debut

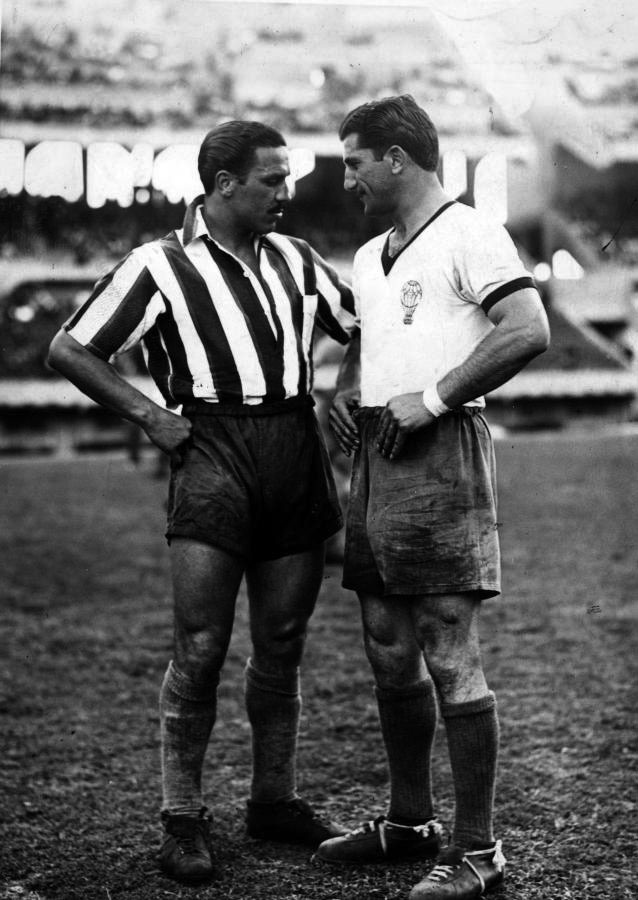
Masantonio (right) with José Manuel Moreno in a Huracán v River Plate match

In his inaugural season in Primera División, Masantonio scored 23 goals. He was a skilled centreforward but was accused of misusing dribbling. A journalist stated that Masantonio "was a centroforward that is Bernabé Ferreyra when he is 40 metres to the goal, and Nolo Ferreira when he is three metres", making a word name with both stars' surnames and comparing their different styles of playing.

By 1939, Masantonio would switch positions on the field, sometimes occupying defensive positions or placing as centrehalf. This resulted in punishment by Huracán executives, alleging that "they have hired him to score goals". In 1941, Masantonio was seconded by prominent players such as Norberto Méndez, Llamil Simes, and Delfín Unzué. Masantonio scored most goals in 1937, 1939, and 1940 (28 each).

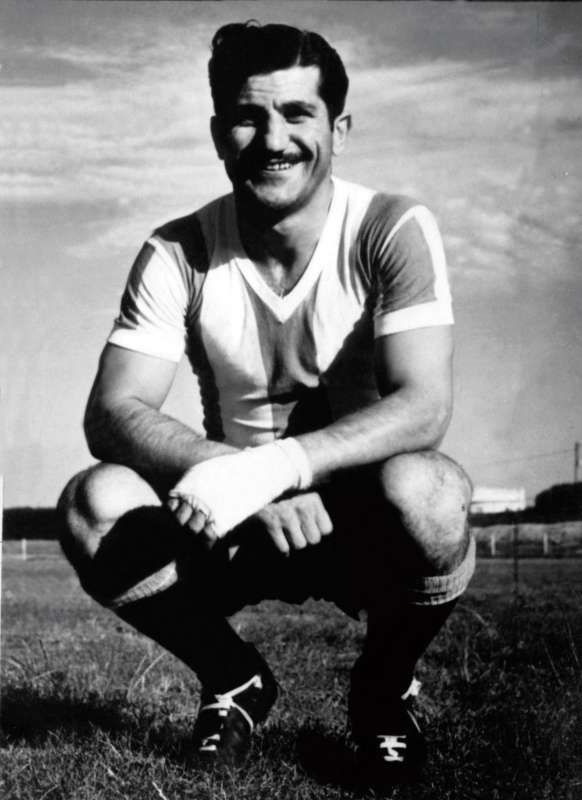
Masantonio with Argentina in the 1930s. He was the top scorer in the 1935 and 1942 South American Championships

Masantonio stayed with Huracán until 1943 when he left the club as a free agent, joining Uruguayan club Defensor at 34 years old. He soon returned to Argentina to play for Banfield in 1944 (only one match in Primera División, where he scored two goals) before retiring after one last season with Huracán (having played 5 matches, with 5 goals scored).

Masantonio scored 246 goals for Huracán, making him the club's highest scoring player. He scored a total of 259 goals in 369 games for all of his club teams.

Masantonio represented Argentina at the 1935 and 1942 South American Championships. He was topscorer in both competitions as Argentina finished second in both tournaments; his 11 goals in the competition leave him in 13th place in the list of Copa América topscorers.

Masantonio scored a total of 21 goals for Argentina in only 19 games, putting him in 11th place in the table of Argentina's top goalscorers.

At only 46 years old, Masantonio died of cancer on September 11, 1956, at the Hospital Rawson. The funeral was held in Club Huracán. Since then, Masantonio has received several tributes, including a monument (inaugurated in March 1996 in front of the club headquarters on Avenida Caseros) and a street with his name in Parque Patricios. Masantonio was the inspiration for an Argentine tango titled "El Mortero del Globito", written by Miguel Padula and Francisco García Jiménez; the song was recorded on 9 May 1933 by the Orquesta Típica Victor, featuring Alberto Gómez on vocals. The song "El Pampero de Patricios" was also dedicated to Masantonio.

== Titles ==
Huracán

- Copa Adrián C. Escobar: 1942

Argentina

- Copa Lipton: 1937

=== Individual ===
- Copa América Top-scorer: 1935, 1942
