= 1943 Copa Adrián Escobar final =

Argentine football match

1943 Copa Adrián C. Escobar Final
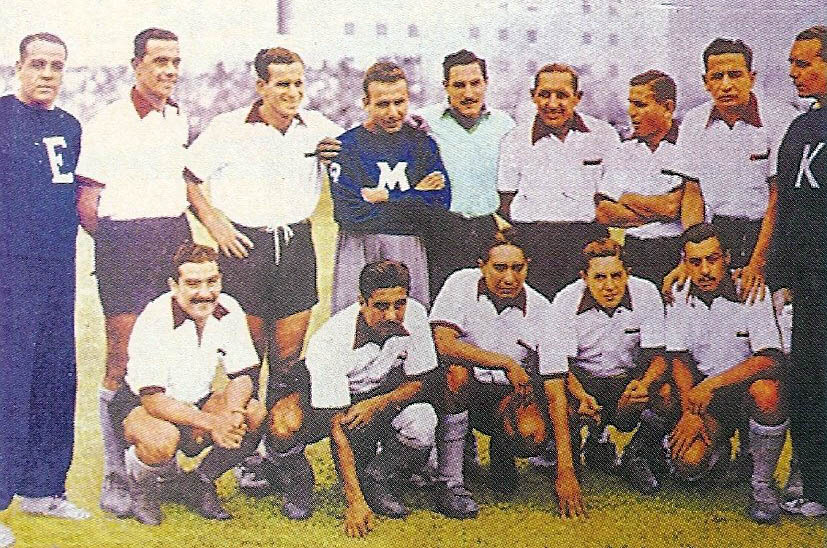
- Huracán, champions
- Event: Copa Adrián C. Escobar
Huracán	Platense
0	0
- Huracán won 4–1 on corner kicks awarded
- Date: December 11, 1943
- Venue: San Lorenzo

The 1943 Copa Adrián C. Escober Final was the match that decided the winner of the fourth edition of the Copa Adrián C. Escobar, an Argentine domestic cup organised by the Argentine Football Association. The match was contested by Club Atlético Huracán, which played its third consecutive final, and Club Atlético Platense.

The final was held in San Lorenzo Stadium on December 11, 1943. After the match ended tied 0–0, Huracán was declared winner 4–1 based on a penalty shootout. Huracán won its second Copa Escobar trophy.

== Qualified teams ==
Team	Previous finals app.
Huracán	1941, **1942**
Platense	(none)

Bold indicates winning years

== Overview ==
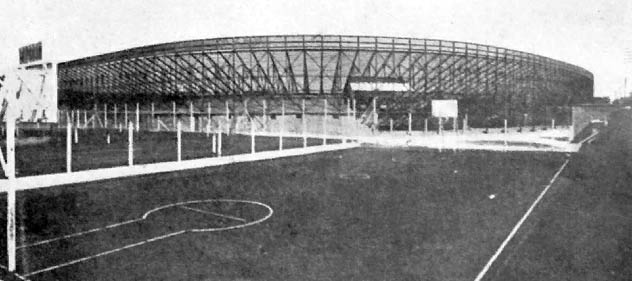
San Lorenzo Stadium, venue of the final

This edition of the Cup was contested by the seven best placed teams of the 1943 Primera División season. Boca Juniors, as champions, advanced directly to semifinals. The matches only lasted 40 minutes (two halves of 20' each), with some teams playing two games a day. River Plate and San Lorenzo stadiums were the venues of the competition.

In the tournament, Huracán beat River Plate 1–0 and Independiente (on corner kicks awarded) at Estadio Monumental. Platense beat Estudiantes de La Plata 1–0 (at Estadio Monumental) and Boca Juniors in semifinals (7–3 on corner kicks after a 1–1 draw) at San Lorenzo Stadium.

== Road to the final ==
Note: all the matches were played at River Plate Stadium

Huracán		Round	Platense	
Opponent	Result	Group stage	Opponent	Result
River Plate	1–0	Quarter final	Estudiantes (LP)	1–0
Independiente	0–0 (3–3, c) (Note: Huracán won by lot.)	Semifinal	Boca Juniors	1–1 (7–3, c)

== Match details ==
1943 Copa Adrián C. Escobar Final
December 11, 1943

Huracán	0–0 (a.e.t.)	Platense
	Report

San Lorenzo Stadium, Buenos Aires

**Huracán**	**Platense**

GK	(Argentina) Bruno Barrionuevo
DF	(Argentina) Carlos Marinelli
DF	(Argentina) Jorge Alberti
MF	(Argentina) Oscar Corzo
MF	(Argentina) Roberto Sbarra
MF	(Argentina) Jorge Titonell
FW	(Uruguay) Rubén Perdomo
FW	(Argentina) Norberto Méndez
FW	(Argentina) Juan Salvini
FW	(Argentina) Llamil Simes
FW	(Argentina) Delfín Unzué
Manager:
(Argentina) Pablo Bartolucci

GK	(Argentina) Julio Cozzi
DF	(Argentina) Carlos Aldabe
DF	(Argentina) Domingo Boero
MF	(Argentina) Juan C. Fonda
MF	(Argentina) Norberto Toledo
MF	(Argentina) Aarón Wergifker
FW	(Argentina) Alberto E. Salvado
FW	(Argentina) Raimundo Sandoval
FW	(Argentina) Raúl Frutos
FW	(Argentina) Juan S. Prado
FW	(Argentina) Roberto Torieli
Manager:
(Argentina) ?

Note: Huracán won 4–1 on corner kicks
