= 1949 Copa Adrián Escobar final =

1949 Copa Adrián C. Escobar Final
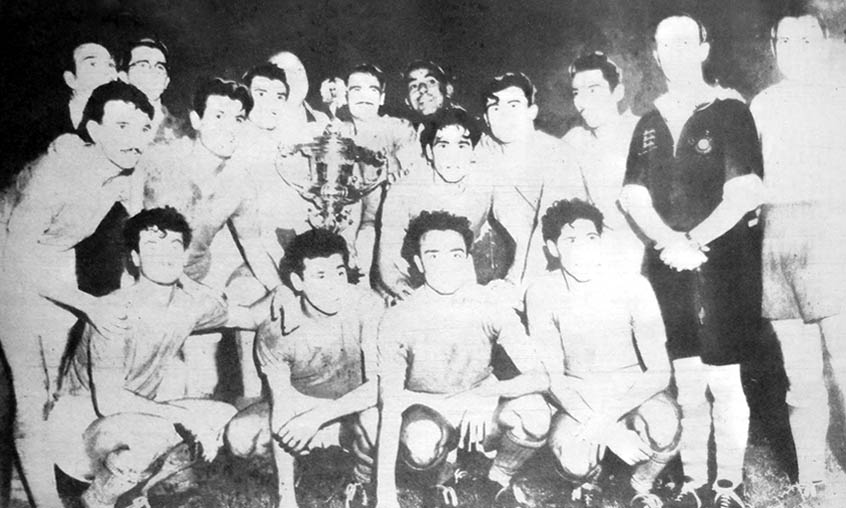
- Newell's Old Boys (with the Independiente shirts they had to wear in the extra time), champions
- Event: Copa Adrián C. Escobar
Newell's Old Boys	Racing
2	2
- (a.e.t.) (Newell's won 4–2 on corners)
- Date: 10 December 1949
- Venue: Independiente Stadium
- Referee: H. Hartles

The 1949 Copa Adrián C. Escobar Final was the final that decided the winner of the 7th. (and last) edition of Copa Adrián C. Escobar, an Argentine domestic cup organised by the Argentine Football Association. The match was contested by Newell's Old Boys and Racing Club.

The final was held in Independiente Stadium on 10 December 1949. After the match ended in a 2–2 draw, a 30' extra time was played. As the score persisted, Newell's was declared winner 4–2 on more corner kicks awarded, winning their first Copa Escobar trophy.

== Qualified teams ==
Team	Previous finals app.
Newell's Old Boys	(none)
Racing	(none)

== Overview ==
This edition was contested by the seven best placed teams of the 1949 Primera División season. Racing Club, as current champion, advanced directly to semifinals where they beat River Plate 3–1. The matches lasted 40 minutes, with the quarterfinals being held in Estadio Tomás Adolfo Ducó (home of Club Atlético Huracán) and the semifinals in Independiente Stadium.

On the other hand, Newell's beat San Lorenzo de Almagro 2–1 in quarterfinals, then eliminating Vélez Sarsfield 1–0 in semifinals.

== Road to the final ==
Note: quarterfinals were played at Huracán Stadium while the semifinals were held in Independiente Stadium.

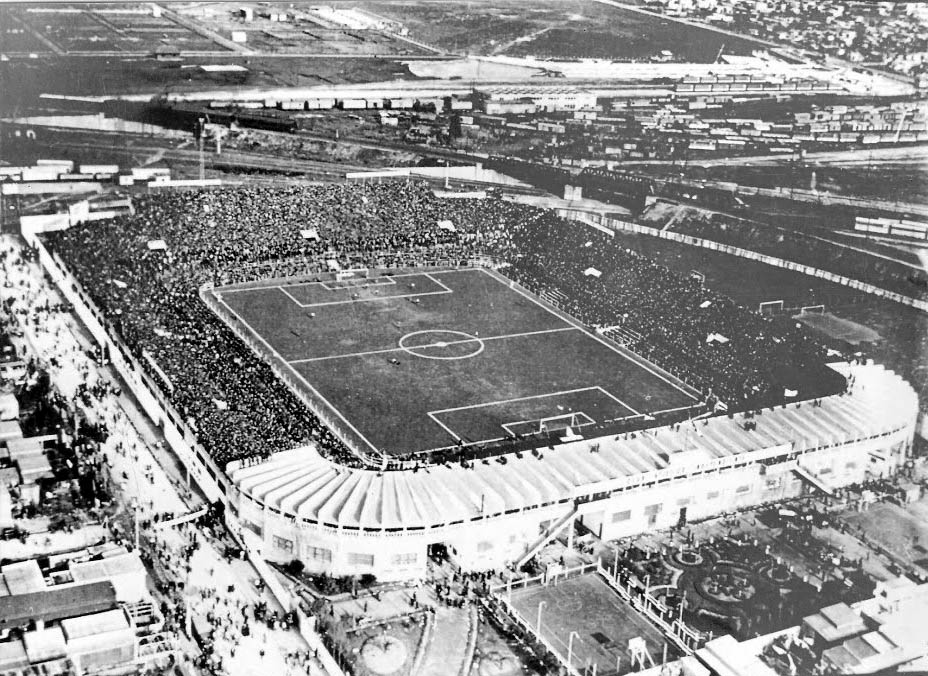
Independiente Stadium hosted the final

Newell's Old Boys		Round	Racing	
Opponent	Result	Group stage	Opponent	Result
San Lorenzo	2–1	Quarter final	– (Note: As Primera División champion, Racing advenced directly to semifinals.)	
Vélez Sarsfield	1–0	Semifinal	River Plate	3–1

== Match details ==
1949 Copa Adrián C. Escobar Final
10 December 1949
Final

Newell's Old Boys	2–2 (a.e.t.)	Racing
Ortigüela 18'; Benavídez 29'	Report	Chamorro 2' (o.g.); Bravo 15'

Independiente Stadium, Avellaneda
Referee: H. Hartles

Newell's	Racing

GK	(Argentina) Eusebio Chamorro
DF	(Argentina) Atilio Miotti
DF	(Argentina) Héctor Pérez
MF	(Argentina) Orlando Peloso
MF	(Argentina) Jaun B. Romo
MF	(Argentina) Roberto Pulsegur
FW	(Argentina) Raúl Contini
FW	(Argentina) Juan A. Benavídez
FW	(Argentina) Heraldo Taveri
FW	(Argentina) Elio Montaño
FW	(Argentina) Marcelo Ortigüela
Manager:
(Argentina) Gerónimo Díaz

GK	(Argentina) Antonio O. Rodríguez
DF	(Argentina) Higinio García
DF	(Argentina) José García Pérez
MF	(Argentina) Juan C. Fonda
MF	(Argentina) Saúl Ongaro
MF	(Argentina) Ernesto Gutiérrez
FW	(Argentina) Juan C. Salvini
FW	(Argentina) Norberto Méndez
FW	(Argentina) Rubén Bravo
FW	(Argentina) Roque Olsen
FW	(Argentina) Ezra Sued
Manager:
(Argentina) Guillermo Stábile

- Note: Newell's won 4–2 on corner kicks
