= TNT Sports =

Sportscasting brand from Warner Bros. Discovery

- TNT Sports logo
- Product type: Trademark
- Current owner: Skydance
- Country: United States
- Related brands: TNT Sports US; TNT Sports Argentina; TNT Sports Brazil; TNT Sports Chile; TNT Sports Mexico; TNT Sports UK
- Markets: Worldwide
- Previous owners: Turner Broadcasting System (1980s–2019); WarnerMedia News & Sports (2019–2022); Warner Bros. Discovery (2022-2026)

TNT Sports is a sports broadcasting brand owned and operated by the Skydance Global Sports Group division of Skydance. Originating from American cable television channel TNT, the brand is used for television networks and channels broadcasting various sporting events globally.

The brand was first used in the 1980s when then-owner and originator Turner Broadcasting System initially created separate TNT Sports and TBS Sports brands for its American channels TNT and TBS, respectively, before introducing a unified Turner Sports brand in 1995. Turner Broadcasting merged with and folded into Time Warner in 1996, which in turn was acquired by AT&T in 2018 and renamed as WarnerMedia. Under AT&T, Turner Sports was transferred to a dedicated division known as WarnerMedia News & Sports. In 2017, the company launched the TNT Sports channel in Argentina, then standardized the rest of its existing Latin American sports channels into the TNT Sports brand in 2021.

AT&T spun-off its WarnerMedia subsidiary, having it merged with Discovery, Inc., to form Warner Bros. Discovery on 8 April 2022. The Warner Bros. Discovery brand was also used for Discovery's existing European and international sports assets such as Eurosport, Golf Digest and Global Cycling Network. In 2024, WBD officially rebranded the entirety of the sports division as TNT Sports in the US and UK while Eurosport still exists in Europe, although WBD Sports still exists as a website and in copyright bylines. Following the 2026 acquisition of WBD by Skydance (then Paramount Skydance), TNT Sports became a sister channel to CBS Sports; with both networks being placed under the Skydance Global Sports Group division.

== Channels and divisions ==
Alternative TNT Sports logo used in Argentina, Brazil, Chile and Mexico prior to 31 May 2024

- TNT Sports (Argentina), the sports channel in Argentina.
- TNT Sports (Brazil), the sports broadcast division for WBD's channels and networks in Brazil.
- TNT Sports (Chile), the sports channel in Chile.
  - TNT Sports HD
  - TNT Sports 2
  - TNT Sports 3
- TNT Sports (Mexico), the sports broadcast division for WBD's channels and networks in Mexico.
- TNT Sports (United Kingdom), 50% with BT Group
  - TNT Sports 1
  - TNT Sports 2
  - TNT Sports 3
  - TNT Sports 4
- TNT Sports (United States) - The sports broadcast division for WBD's channels and networks in the United States, including its original namesake, the cable channel TNT.

== See also ==
- beIN Sports
- ESPN International
- Fox Sports
- Setanta Sports Eurasia
- StarTimes Sports
- TUDN
