= TNT Sports (Mexico) =

Mexican pay television channel

TNT Sports Mexico
- Country: Mexico
- Broadcast area: National
- Headquarters: Mexico City, Mexico

Ownership
- Owner: TNT Sports (operated by Skydance Corporation)
- Sister channels: TNT; TNT Series; TNT Sports (Argentina); TNT Sports (Brazil); TNT Sports (United Kingdom); TNT Sports (Chile)

History
- Launched: June 10, 2021 (as TNT Sports)

Links
- Website: tntsports.com.mx

TNT Sports Mexico is a privately owned sports pay TV channel of Mexico. It is the brand used by Skydance Corporation in Mexico for sports broadcasts aired on the company's channels (mainly TNT and Cinemax) and its streaming platform, Max, primarily focused on soccer.

It was founded on June 10, 2021, and announced on its social media channels as the starting point for broadcasting the UEFA Champions League beginning with the 2021–2022 season.

== History ==
Weeks before the end of the 2020–2021 UEFA Champions League season, reports emerged that Fox Sports and ESPN had not renewed their broadcast agreement for an additional three years (2021–2024), and that WarnerMedia had secured the exclusive rights to air the competition through its new streaming platform, HBO Max.

It was during the HBO Max launch video on May 26, 2021, that the platform confirmed the exclusive rights to the tournament, though it would only be available in Mexico and Brazil. Later, in the afternoon of June 10, a video posted on social media announced the arrival of the TNT Sports brand in Mexico, confirming that it would broadcast the entire tournament exclusively through HBO Max, while also sublicensing select matches for television. This was reaffirmed in a press release, which revealed that TNT Sports' content distribution would begin on June 11 via social media, with its first full match broadcast being the UEFA Super Cup between Chelsea and Villarreal, held on August 11.

Initially, programming consisted of a TNT Sports block on Cinemax, as well as a stronger presence on TNT on match days. The brand is also used to stream content on Max, as well as for live-format programming on social media platforms.

In 2022, WarnerMedia acquired the broadcast rights to the 2021 FIFA Club World Cup, airing it on TNT Sports channels in Argentina and Chile, while the Mexican brand was used to exclusively broadcast the tournament on TNT not only in Mexico, but also across Central America and the Dominican Republic, marking TNT Sports’ debut in those regions with coverage of that event.

On August 2, 2024, TNT Sports confirmed the acquisition of broadcast rights to 50% of the Premier League matches per season, 40 FA Cup games each season, and the FA Community Shield, starting with the 2024–2025 season through 2027–2028 in Mexico, Central America, and the Dominican Republic — the latter representing the brand's first sports offering on Max for that region.

As of April 6, 2025, TNT Sports also secured TV and streaming rights to the top Sunday night match of Major League Soccer, as part of a broader agreement covering all of Latin America.

== Sports coverage ==
=== Football (On TNT Sports) ===
- UEFA Champions League
- UEFA Super Cup
- Premier League
- FA Cup
- FA Community Shield
- Liga de Primera

== Programs ==
- Todos Somos Técnicos
- El show de la Champions
- Lo mejor de la Champions
- Champions espectacular
- Combate Space
- Champions Retro
- MFM Debate

== Notable members ==
- (Mexico) Andrés Rodríguez
- (Mexico) Christian Elguea
- (Chile) Cristian Rivas
- (Mexico) Daniel Barba
- (Mexico) Edgar Rosado
- (Argentina) Eduardo Biscayart
- (Argentina) Emiliano Raggi
- (Brazil) Fred Caldeira
- (Mexico) Guillermo Navarro
- (Spain) Ignacio Miguélez
- (Mexico) María José González
- (Mexico) Miroslava Montemayor
- (Mexico) Pepe del Bosque
- (Mexico) Roberto González
- (Mexico) Rodrigo Lara
- (Uruguay) Enzo Olivera
- (Mexico) Natalia Briz

== See also ==
- Television in Mexico
