= Trofeo de Campeones de la Superliga Argentina =

- Organiser(s): Superliga Argentina
- Founded: 2019
- Abolished: 2019; 7 years ago
- Region: Argentina
- Teams: 2
- Related competitions: Copa Superliga; Primera División
- Last champions: Racing Club (1st title)
- Most championships: Racing Club (1 title)
- Broadcaster(s): Fox Sports; TNT Sports

The Trofeo de Campeones de la Superliga Argentina was an official national football cup of Argentina organized by the Superliga Argentina de Fútbol (SAF). The competition intended to be an annual contest nevertheless it was discontinued (along with Copa de la Superliga) after AFA dissolved the SAF in 2020.

The Trofeo de Campeones was succeeded by Trofeo de Campeones de la Liga Profesional, organised by the AFA through its body "Liga Profesional de Fútbol".

== History ==
The annual football match was played for the first time in 2019, being contested by the reigning champions of Primera División and Copa de la Superliga respectively.

In February 2020, President of AFA Claudio Tapia stated that the Superliga had been established to position Argentine football as a product, but it failed in that purpose. As a result, AFA would take over the organisation of Primera División championships, according with Tapia's statement. One month after those announcements, the president of the Superliga, Mariano Elizondo, resigned.

Nevertheless, only one year after of the first edition, The SAF was dissolved by the AFA and replaced by a similar body, "Liga Profesional de Fútbol". As a result, all competitions organised by the Superliga were cancelled. Beyond of that, the COVID-19 pandemic in Argentina caused the 2020 final was never played.

== List of champions ==
Keys

- CS: Winner of Copa de la Superliga.
- PD: Winner of Primera División.

Ed.	Year	Winner	Score	Runner-up	Venue	City
1	2019	Racing (PD)	2–0	Tigre (CS)	José María Minella	Mar del Plata
