= 1920 Copa de Competencia (AAmF) Final =

1920 Copa de Competencia (AAmF)
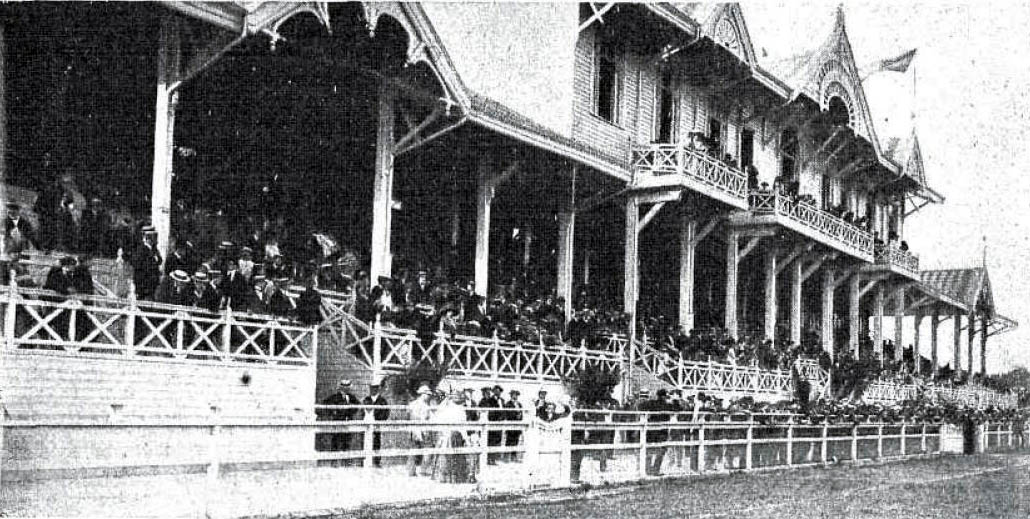
- Estadio GEBA, venue
- Event: 1920 Copa de Competencia (AAmF)
Sp. Almagro	Rosario Central
0	2
- Date: December 12, 1920; 105 years ago
- Venue: Gimnasia y Esgrima (BA)
- Referee: Antonio Suñé

The 1920 Copa de Competencia Final was the final that decided the champion of the first edition of this national cup of Argentina, organised by dissident body Asociación Amateurs de Football.

The match was held in Estadio GEBA (home venue of Club Gimnasia y Esgrima de Buenos Aires) on December 12, 1920, where Rosario Central defeated Sportivo Almagro 2–0.

== Qualified teams ==
Team	Previous final app.
Rosario Central	(none)
Sportivo Almagro	(none)

Note

- **Bold** indicates winning years

== Overview ==
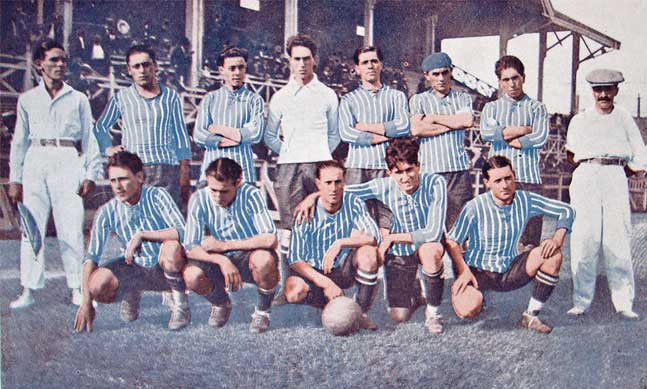
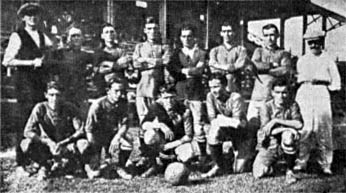
Starting lineups of Sportivo Almagro (left) and Rosario Central for the final

The "Asociación Amateurs de Football" was a dissident association that had split from the AFA in 1919. The AAmF organised in 1920 its own cup competition, named "Copa de Competencia" as it was a usual practise on those times.

This edition was contested by 21 teams, 19 within Buenos Aires Province and 2 from Liga Rosarina (Rosario Central and Nacional) that entered directly to the second round. The cup had a single-elimination tournament format.

Rosario Central reached the final after beating River Plate (2–0), counterpart Nacional (3–2) and San Isidro (2–0 in semifinal).

On the other side, Sportivo Almagro earned its right to play the final after beating Barracas Central (2–0), Lanús (3–2), and Racing (2-0 in semifinals).

In the final, played at Estadio G.E.B.A., Rosario Central beat Almagro 2-0 with goals by Harry Hayes and Antonio Macías to win their 5th. national cup.

== Match details ==
1920 Copa de Competencia (AAmF) Final
21 December 1920

Sp. Almagro	0–2	Rosario Central
	Report	E. Hayes 15'; Macías 73'

Estadio GEBA, Buenos Aires
Referee: Antonio Suñé

**Sportivo Almagro**	**Rosario Central**

GK	(Argentina) Guido Régoli
DF	(Argentina) Humberto Recanatini
DF	(Argentina) Ernesto Vieyro
MF	(Argentina) Eduardo Capelletti
MF	(Argentina) Eusebio Goicochea
MF	(Argentina) Pedro Pisa
FW	(Argentina) Francisco Pisa
FW	(Argentina) Juan Pisa
FW	(Argentina) Clemente Bonzi
FW	(Argentina) Antonio Rodríguez
FW	(Argentina) José Adet

GK	(Argentina) Vicente Pugliese
DF	(Argentina) Patricio Clarke
DF	(Argentina) Florencio Sarasíbar
MF	(Argentina) José Angel Pignani
MF	(Argentina) José Fioroni
MF	(Argentina) Jacinto Perazzo
FW	(Argentina) Antonio Macías
FW	(Argentina) Juan Francia
FW	(Argentina) Harry Hayes
FW	(Argentina) Ennis Hayes
FW	(Argentina) Enrique Tami
