= List of Argentine football national cups =

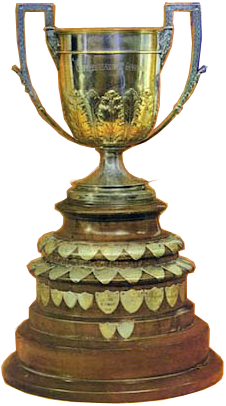
The "Copa Campeonato" trophy was awarded to Primera División champion from 1896 until 1926. From 2013 to 2015, it was given to the Superfinal winner.

Since the creation of the first league in 1891, several official cups have been played in Argentina apart from the main competition, the Primera División championship. The first cup held in the country was the Copa de Honor Municipalidad de Buenos Aires; launched in 1905, it was played until 1920.

The Copa Campeonato, originally awarded to Primera División champion, is the oldest trophy of Argentine football for a current competition, having been established in 1896, three year after the Association was created, and played without interruption until 1926. The Cup received several names, such as "Championship Cup", "Copa Campeonato", "Challenge Cup", and "Copa Alumni", due to the association offered legendary team Alumni to keep the Cup definitely for having won it three consecutive times (1900–02), but the club from Belgrano declined the honour to keep the trophy under dispute.

In June 2013, the association decided to put the trophy back into circulation with the creation of a new competition, named "Superfinal" that consisted in a single match between winners of Torneo Inicial and Torneo Final, played in a neutral venue.

Current cup competitions held in Argentina are Copa Argentina, Supercopa Argentina, Copa de la Liga Profesional, Trofeo de Campeones de la Liga Profesional, and the most recent Supercopa Internacional.

== List of cup competitions ==
The following is a list with all the national cups held in Argentina until present days. Only competitions where Primera División clubs took part are included.

Keys

- AFA = Argentine Football Association
- FAF = Federación Argentina de Football
- AAmF = Asociación Amateurs de Football
- LAF = Liga Argentina de Football
- SAF = Superliga Argentina de Fútbol

Cup	Org.	Status	Years held	Contested by clubs from division
Copa de Honor MBA	AFA	Defunct	1905–1920	Primera División and Liga Rosarina
Copa de Competencia Jockey Club	AFA	Defunct	1907–1933	Primera División and Liga Rosarina
Copa de Competencia La Nación	FAF	Defunct	1913–1914	Primera División, Segunda División and Federación Rosarina de Football
Copa Dr. Carlos Ibarguren	AFA	Defunct	1913–1952	Primera División and Regional leagues
Copa Estímulo	AFA	Defunct	1920–1926	Primera División
Copa de Competencia (AAmF)	AAmF	Defunct	1920–1926	Primera División and Asociación Amateurs Rosarina de Football
Copa de Competencia (LAF)	LAF	Defunct	1932–1933	Primera División
Copa Beccar Varela	LAF	Defunct	1932–1933	Primera División
Copa Adrián C. Escobar	AFA	Defunct	1939–1949	Primera División
Copa General Pedro Ramírez	AFA	Defunct	1943–1945	Primera División and Regional leagues
Copa de Competencia Británica	AFA	Defunct	1944–1946	Primera División
Copa Campeonato Juan Domingo Perón	AFA	Defunct	1955	Primera División
Copa Campeones de la República Argentina (Note: Competition organised by AFA's "Consejo Federal", held in 1959. It was contested by clubs from regional leagues outside Buenos Aires with no direct affiliation to the Association.)	AFA	Defunct	1959	Regional leagues
Copa Suecia (Note: Cup established to be played only once.)	AFA	Defunct	1958	Primera División
Copa Argentina	AFA	Active	1969–70, 2012–	All divisions of Argentine league system
Copa Centenario de la AFA	AFA	Defunct	1993	Primera División
Supercopa Argentina	AFA	Active	2012–	Primera División and Copa Argentina champions
Copa Campeonato	AFA	Defunct	2014 (Note: For this edition, the Copa Campeonato (also known as "Superfinal") was homologated as a national cup instead of a Primera División title. Nevertheless, the cup has not been held since.)	Torneo Inicial and Torneo Final champions (Note: Split seasons similar to Apertura and Clausura format.)
Copa Bicentenario	AFA	Defunct	2016	Primera División (2014 and 2016) champions
Copa de la Superliga	SAF	Defunct	2019	Primera División
Trofeo de Campeones (SAF)	SAF	Defunct	2019	Primera División and Copa de la Superliga champions
Copa de la Liga Profesional	AFA	Defunct	2020–2024	Primera División
Trofeo de Campeones (LPF) (Note: It took the name and format from the homonymous cup after the Superliga was dissolved.)	AFA	Active	2020–	Primera División and Copa de la Liga champions
Supercopa Internacional	AFA	Active	2022–	Primera División and Trofeo de Campeones (LPF) champions

== Titles by club ==
Rank	Club	Titles	Winning years
1	Boca Juniors	17	Copa de Competencia Jockey Club: 1919, 1925; Copa Ibarguren: 1919, 1923, 1924, 1940, 1944; Copa Estímulo: 1926; Copa de Competencia Británica: 1946; Copa Argentina: 1969, 2012, 2015, 2020; Supercopa Argentina: 2018, 2022; Copa de la Liga Profesional: 2020, 2022
2	River Plate	16	Copa de Competencia Jockey Club: 1914; Copa de Competencia (LAF): 1932; Copa Ibarguren: 1937, 1941, 1942, 1952; Copa Adrián C. Escobar: 1941; Copa Campeonato: 2014; Copa Argentina: 2016, 2017, 2019; Supercopa Argentina: 2017, 2019, 2023; Trofeo de Campeones (LPF): 2021, 2023
3	Racing	15	Copa de Honor MCBA: 1912, 1913, 1915, 1917; Copa Ibarguren: 1913, 1914, 1916, 1917, 1918; Copa Beccar Varela: 1932; Copa de Competencia (LAF): 1933; Copa de Competencia Británica: 1945; Trofeo de Campeones (SAF): 2019; Trofeo de Campeones (LPF): 2022; Supercopa Internacional: 2022
4	Independiente	9	Copa de Competencia La Nación: 1914; Copa de Competencia Jockey Club: 1917; Copa de Honor MCBA: 1918; Copa de Competencia (AAm): 1924, 1925, 1926; Copa Ibarguren: 1938, 1939; Copa Adrián C. Escobar: 1939
5	Huracán	8	Copa Estímulo: 1920; Copa Ibarguren: 1922, 1925; Copa Adrián C. Escobar: 1942, 1943; Copa de Competencia Británica: 1944; Copa Argentina: 2014; Supercopa Argentina: 2014
6	Rosario Central	7	Copa de Competencia La Nación: 1913; Copa Ibarguren: 1915; Copa de Honor MCBA: 1916; Copa de Competencia Jockey Club: 1916; Copa de Competencia (AAm): 1920; Copa Argentina: 2018; Copa de la Liga Profesional: 2023
7	Estudiantes (LP)	6	Copa Adrián C. Escobar: 1944; Copa General Pedro Ramírez: 1945; Copa Argentina: 2023; Copa de la Liga Profesional: 2024; Trofeo de Campeones (LPF): 2024, 2025
8	Alumni	5	Copa de Honor MCBA: 1905, 1906; Copa de Competencia Jockey Club: 1907, 1908, 1909
9	San Isidro	4	Copa de Honor MCBA: 1909; Copa de Competencia Jockey Club: 1911, 1912, 1913
10	Newell's Old Boys	3	Copa de Honor MCBA: 1911; Copa Ibarguren: 1921; Copa Adrián C. Escobar: 1949
10	Lanús	3	Copa Campeonato Juan Domingo Perón: 1955; Copa Bicentenario: 2016; Supercopa Argentina: 2016
10	Vélez Sarsfield	3	Supercopa Argentina: 2013, 2024; Supercopa Internacional: 2024
11	Porteño	2	Copa de Competencia Jockey Club: 1915, 1918
11	San Lorenzo	2	Copa General Pedro Ramírez: 1943; Supercopa Argentina: 2015
11	Arsenal	2	Supercopa Argentina: 2012; Copa Argentina: 2013
12	Belgrano A.C.	1	Copa de Honor MCBA: 1907
12	Quilmes	1	Copa de Honor MCBA: 1908
12	Estudiantes (BA)	1	Copa de Competencia Jockey Club: 1910
12	Banfield	1	Copa de Honor MCBA: 1920
12	Tiro Federal	1	Copa Ibarguren: 1920
12	Sportivo Barracas	1	Copa de Competencia Jockey Club: 1921
12	Sportivo Balcarce	1	Copa de Competencia Jockey Club: 1931
12	Central Córdoba (R)	1	Copa Beccar Varela: 1933
12	Nueva Chicago	1	Copa de Competencia Jockey Club: 1933
12	San Martín (T)	1	Copa General Pedro Ramírez: 1944
12	Atlanta	1	Copa Suecia: (Note: One-time competition.) 1958–1960
12	Atlético Tucumán	1	Copa de Campeones de la República Argentina: 1959–60
12	Gimnasia y Esgrima (LP)	1	Copa Centenario de la AFA: 1993
12	Tigre	1	Copa de la Superliga: 2019
12	Colón	1	Copa de la Liga Profesional: 2021
12	Patronato	1	Copa Argentina: 2022
12	Talleres (C)	1	Supercopa Internacional: 2023
12	Central Córdoba (SdE)	1	Copa Argentina: 2024
12	Independiente Rivadavia	1	Copa Argentina: 2025

== Trophies gallery ==
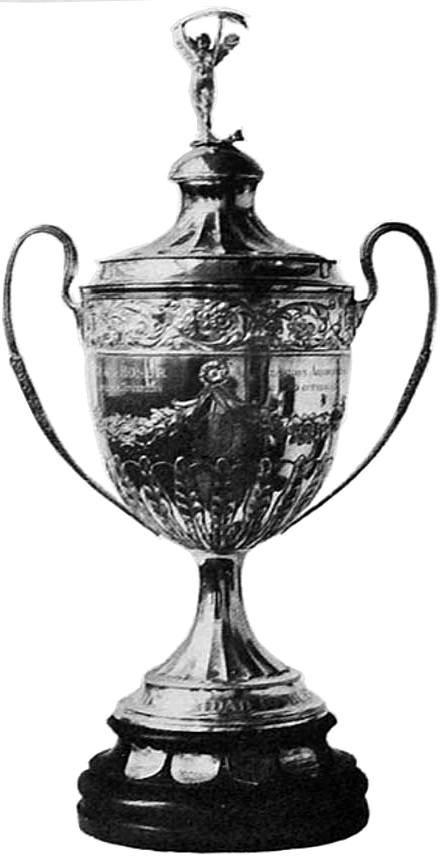
Copa de Honor MCBA

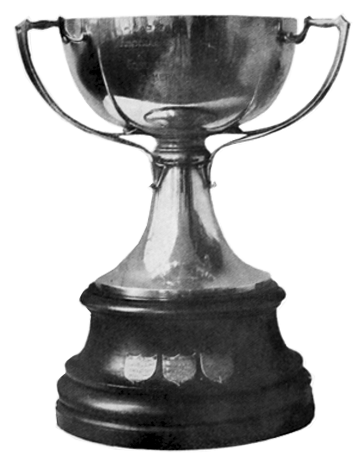
Copa Jockey Club

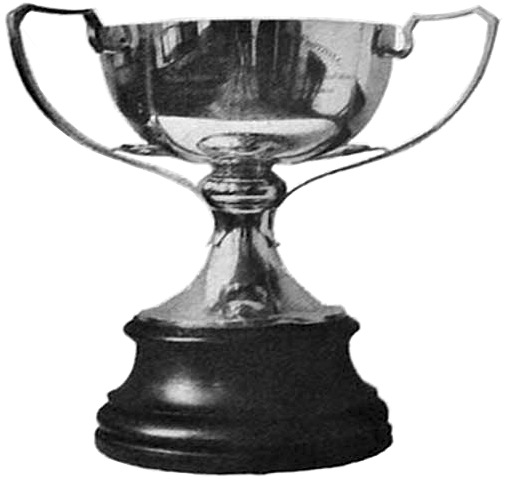
Copa Carlos Ibarguren

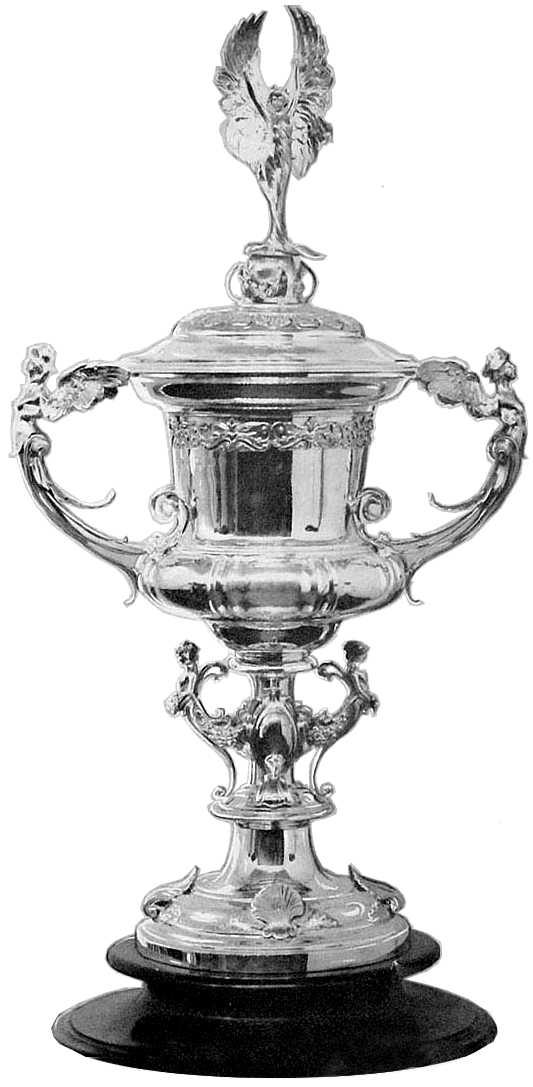
Copa Adrián Escobar

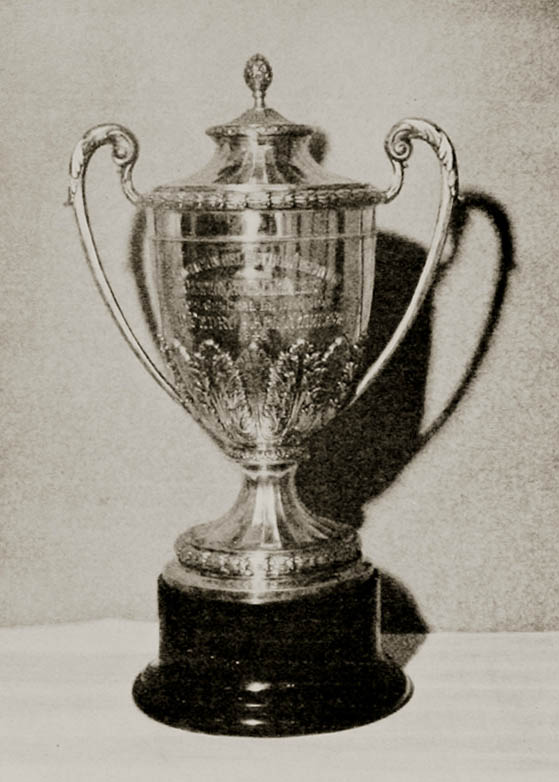
Copa General Pedro Ramírez

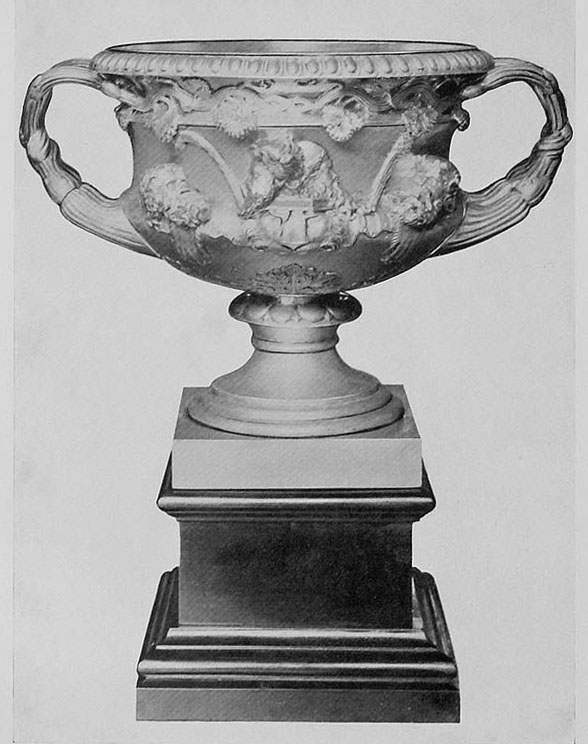
Copa de Competencia Británica "George VI"

== Other cups ==
Apart from the cups mentioned, there were other competitions such as Copa Bullrich (contested from 1903 to 1934 by teams of lower divisions) and Copa Presidente de la Nación (contested from representatives of regional leagues), originally organised by dissident Asociación Amateurs de Football (1920–26) and then continued by AFA from 1927 to 1989).

Because of not having been contested by Primera División clubs, these cups are not included in the list of national cups by the Argentine Association although they were official competitions.
