= Norberto Méndez =

Norberto Méndez may refer to:

- Norberto Méndez (footballer) (1923–1998), Argentine footballer
- Norberto Méndez (canoeist) (born 1971), Argentine sprint canoer
