= 1941 Copa Adrián Escobar final =

1941 Copa Adrián C. Escobar Final
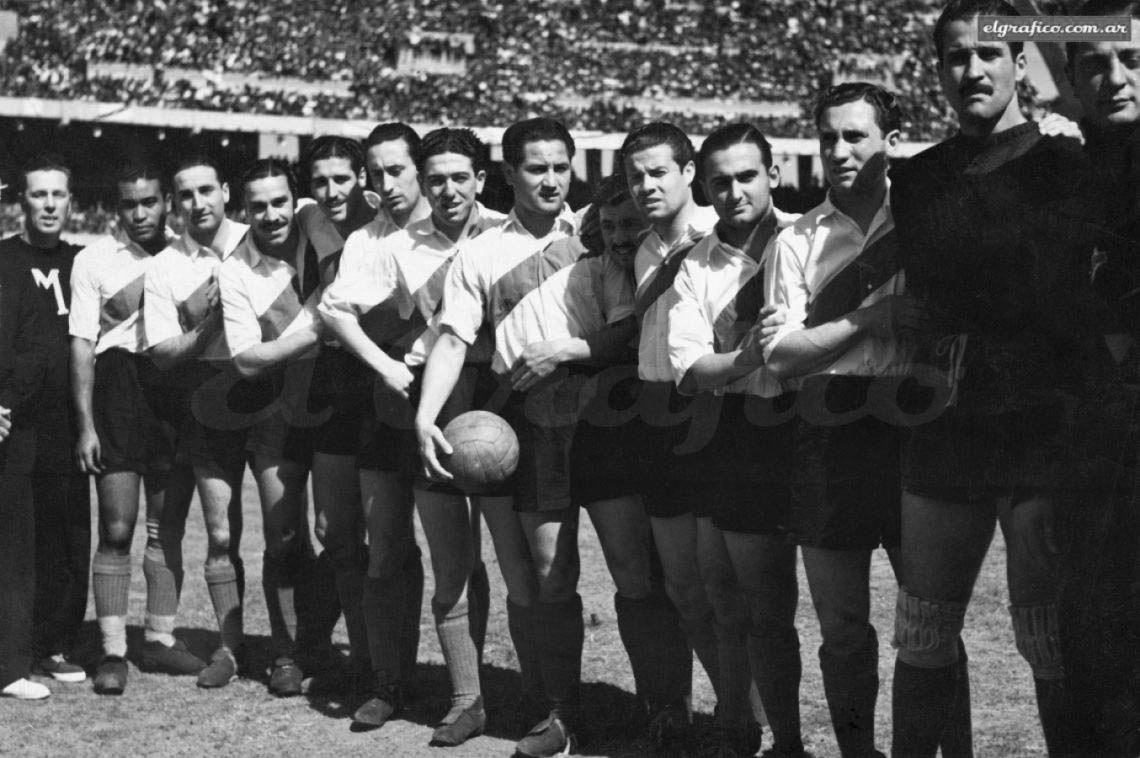
- A River Plate team of 1941
- Event: Copa Adrián C. Escobar
River Plate	Huracán
1	0
- Date: November 2, 1941
- Venue: River Plate
- Referee: Rafael Carou
- Attendance: 66,000

The 1941 Copa Adrián C. Escober Final was the final that decided the winner of the 2nd. edition of Copa Adrián C. Escobar, an Argentine domestic cup organised by the Argentine Football Association. The match was contested by River Plate and Huracán, both being finalists for the first time.

The final was held in River Plate Stadium on November 2, 1941. With an attendance of 66,000, River Plate beat Huracán 1–0 winning their first Copa Escobar trophy.

== Qualified teams ==
Team	Previous finals app.
River Plate	(none)
Huracán	(none)

== Overview ==
This edition was contested by the seven best placed teams of the 1942 Primera División season. River Plate, as champion, advanced directly to semifinals. The matches only lasted 40 minutes (two halves of 20' each), with some teams playing two games in a day. All the matches were held in River Plate Stadium.

In the tournament, Huracán beat Independiente 1–0 in quarterfinals, and Newell's Old Boys 2–1 in semifinals. River Plate beat San Lorenzo de Almagro in semifinals 2–1 to advance to the final, which they subsequently won.

== Road to the final ==
Note: all the matches were played at River Plate Stadium

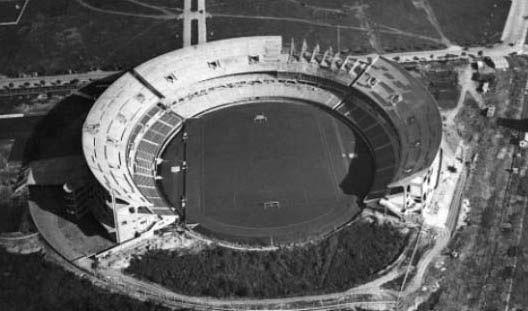
Estadio Monumental, venue

River Plate		Round	Huracán	
Opponent	Result	Group stage	Opponent	Result
– (Note: As Primera División current champion, River Plate entered directly to semifinal.)		Quarter final	Independiente	1–0
San Lorenzo	2–1	Semifinal	Newell's Old Boys	2–1

== Match details ==
1941 Copa Adrián C. Escobar Final
November 2, 1941
Final

River Plate	1–0	Huracán
D'Alessandro	Report

River Plate, Buenos Aires
Attendance: 66,000
Referee: Rafael Carou

River Plate	Huracán

GK	(Uruguay) Julio Barrios
DF	(Argentina) Ricardo Vaghi
DF	(Argentina) Avelino Cadilla
MF	(Argentina) Norberto Yácono
MF	(Argentina) Bruno Rodolfi
MF	(Argentina) José Ramos
FW	(Argentina) Juan Carlos Muñoz
FW	(Argentina) José María Moreno
FW	(Argentina) Roberto D'Alessandro
FW	(Argentina) Ángel Labruna
FW	(Argentina) Carlos Peucelle
Manager:
(Argentina) Renato Cesarini

GK	(Argentina) Ramón A. Ledesma
DF	(Argentina) Carlos Marinelli
DF	(Argentina) Jorge Alberti
MF	(Argentina) Carlos Martínez
MF	(Argentina) Manuel Giúdice
MF	(Argentina) Jorge Titonell
FW	(Argentina) Delfín Unzué
FW	(Argentina) Norberto Méndez
FW	(Argentina) Roberto Sbarra
FW	(Argentina) Juan Novo
FW	(Argentina) Oscar Corzo
Manager:
(Argentina) Pablo Bartolucci
