= 1908 Copa de Honor MCBA Final =

1908 Copa de Honor Final
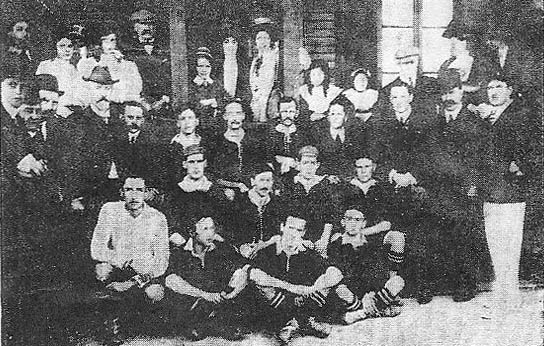
- A Quilmes team of 1908
- Event: 1908 Copa de Honor "Municipalidad de Buenos Aires"
Quilmes	Porteño
2	1
- Date: ?, 1908
- Venue: Quilmes Stadium, Quilmes

The 1908 Copa de Honor Municipalidad de Buenos Aires Final was the football match that decided the champion of the 4th. edition of this National cup of Argentina. In the match, held in the Quilmes A.C. Stadium (alson known as "Quilmes Old Ground") in the homonymous city, Quilmes defeated Porteño 2–1. to win their first Copa de Honor trophy.

== Qualified teams ==
Team	Previous final app.
Quilmes	1907
Porteño	(none)

Note

- **Bold** indicates winning years

== Overview ==
The 1908 edition was contested by 11 clubs, 8 within Buenos Aires Province, and 3 from Liga Rosarina de Football. Playing in a single-elimination tournament, Belgrano eliminated both Rosarino teams, first Argentino 4–1 and then Rosario Central in semifinals, 5–2.

On the other hand, Porteño eliminated San Isidroafter beating them 5–3 in playoff to break the 1–1 original draw. In semifinals, Porteño defeated Newell's Old Boys 3–2 at Club Argentino's venue in Rosario.

In the final, Quilmes defeated Porteño 2–1, at the Quilmes Old Ground to win their first Copa de Honor trophy after two consecutive finals played.

== Road to the final ==
- H: home
- A: away
- N: neutral

Quilmes		Round	Porteño	
Opponent	Result	Stage	Opponent	Result
–	–	Round of 8	–	–
Argentino (R)	4–1 (H)	Quarterfinal	San Isidro	1–1, 5–3 (A)
Rosario Central	5–2 (H)	Semifinal	Newell's Old Boys	3–2 (A) (Note: Played at Club Argentino's venue in Rosario.)

== Match details ==
1908 Copa de Honor MCBA Final
?, 1908

Quilmes	2–1	Porteño
? ?	Report	?

Quilmes A.C. Stadium, Quilmes

**Quilmes**	**Porteño**
