= Copa de la Superliga =

- Organiser(s): Superliga Argentina
- Founded: 2019
- Abolished: 2020; 6 years ago
- Region: Argentina
- Teams: 24
- Qualifier for: Copa Libertadores; Copa Sudamericana; Trofeo de Campeones
- Related competitions: Primera División
- Last champions: Tigre (1st title)
- Most championships: Tigre (1 title)
- Broadcaster(s): Fox Sports; TNT Sports

The Copa de la Superliga Argentina was an Argentine cup competition. It was contested by all the teams participating in the Primera División, and played after the conclusion of the regular season.

The 2019 edition was sponsored by YPF, with its brand "Infinia", while the 2020 edition was sponsored by Cerveza Quilmes, with its brand "Quilmes Clásica".

== History ==
In its first edition (held in 2019), the six best placed clubs in the league season qualified for the round of 16, while the 20 remaining ones played a preliminary round. Unlike the Copa Argentina, all rounds were played in a double-legged system except for the final, held at a neutral venue. The champions and runners-up were eligible to play the Copa Libertadores (group stage) and Copa Sudamericana, respectively.

For the 2020 edition, the 24 teams competing in Primera División were split into two zones of 12 teams each. The winners and runners-up of each zone would play the semifinals and the semifinal winners will play a single-match final. The tournament was scheduled to run from March to May 2020. The champions would qualify for the Copa Libertadores. For the first time in the competition, points earned would be added to the relegation table in order to determine which teams would be relegated to Primera B Nacional.

In February 2020, President of AFA Claudio Tapia stated that the Superliga had been established to position Argentine football as a product, but it failed in that purpose. As a result, AFA would take over the organisation of the top division championships, according with Tapia's statement. One month after those announcements, the president of the Superliga, Mariano Elizondo, resigned. As a result, all competitions organised by the Superliga were cancelled. Eventually, the 2020 edition was abandoned on 28 April 2020.

== List of champions ==
Ed.	Year	Winner	Score	Runner-up	Venue	City	Ref.
1	2019	Tigre	2–0	Boca Juniors	Mario Kempes	Córdoba	
2	2020	(abandoned because of the COVID-19 pandemic)					

== See also ==
- Argentine Primera División
- Superliga Argentina de Fútbol
