= 1939 Copa Adrián Escobar final =

1939 Copa Adrián C. Escobar Final
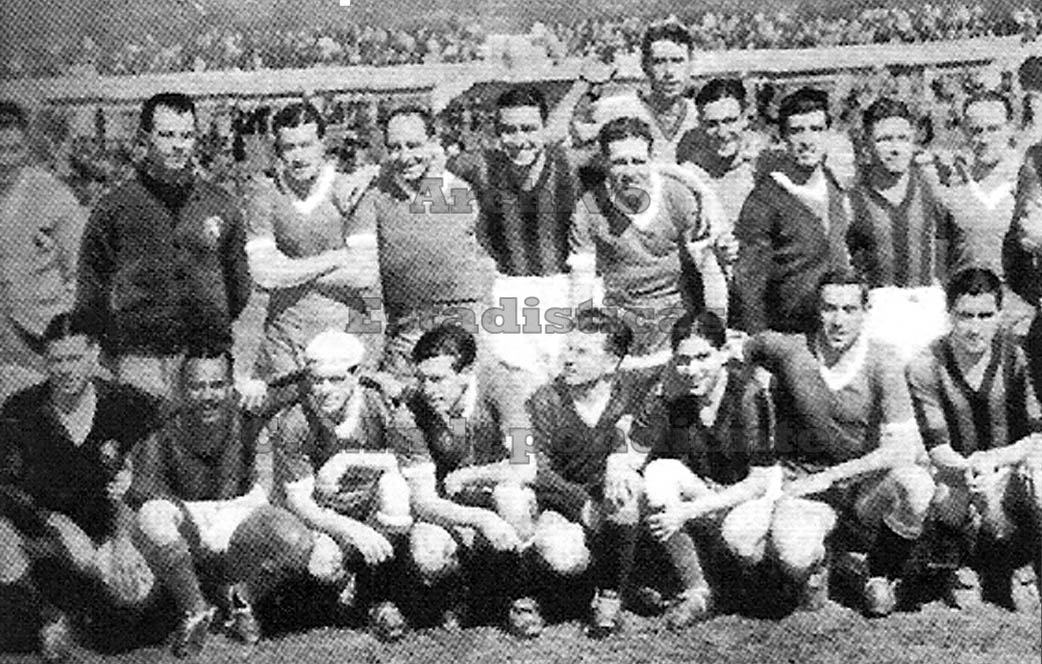
- Independiente and San Lorenzo teams posing together in the final
- Event: Copa Adrián C. Escobar
| Independiente | San Lorenzo |
| 0 | 0 |
- (1–1 on corner kicks)
- Date: 8 December 1939
- Venue: River Plate
- Referee: J.J. Alvarez

1939 Copa Adrián C. Escobar Playoff
- Event: Copa Adrián C. Escobar
| Independiente | San Lorenzo |
| 2 | 0 |
- Date: 8 December 1939
- Venue: River Plate
- Referee: H. Dottori

The 1941 Copa Adrián C. Escober Final was the final that decided the winner of the 1st. edition of Copa Adrián C. Escobar, an Argentine domestic cup organised by the Argentine Football Association. The match was contested by Independiente and San Lorenzo.

The final was held in River Plate Stadium on 8 December 1939. As the match ended 0–0 (and both teams also tied on corner kicks: 1–1), a play-off was carried out to define a champion. It was played on the same day, and Independiente won 2–0, winning their first Copa Escobar trophy.

== Qualified teams ==
| Team | Previous finals app. |
|---|---|
| Independiente | (none) |
| San Lorenzo | (none) |

== Overview ==
This edition was contested by the seven best placed teams of the 1939 Primera División season. Independiente, as current champion, advanced directly to semifinals. The matches only lasted 20 minutes in quarterfinals and semifinals, and 30' in the final. All the matches were held in River Plate Stadium.

In the tournament, Independiente beat Boca Juniors 1–0 in semifinals, while San Lorenzo eliminated Newell's Old Boys 1–0 and River Plate (by the same score) in semifinals.

=== Road to the final ===
Note: all the matches were played at River Plate Stadium

| River Plate | | Round | Huracán | |
|---|---|---|---|---|
| Opponent | Result | Group stage | Opponent | Result |
| – (Note: As Primera División current champion, River Plate entered directly to semifinal.) | | Quarter final | Independiente | 1–0 |
| San Lorenzo | 2–1 | Semifinal | Newell's Old Boys | 2–1 |

== Match details ==
1939 Copa Adrián C. Escobar Final
8 December 1939
Final

| Independiente | 0–0 | San Lorenzo |
|---|---|---|
| | Report |

River Plate, Buenos Aires
Referee: J.J. Alvarez

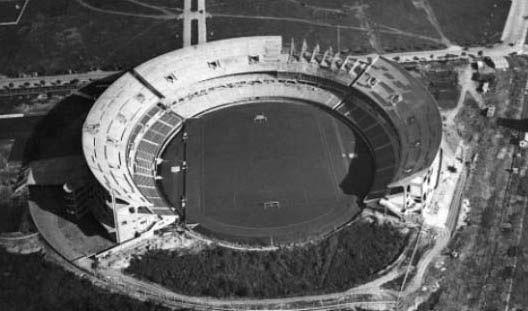
River Plate Stadium, venue

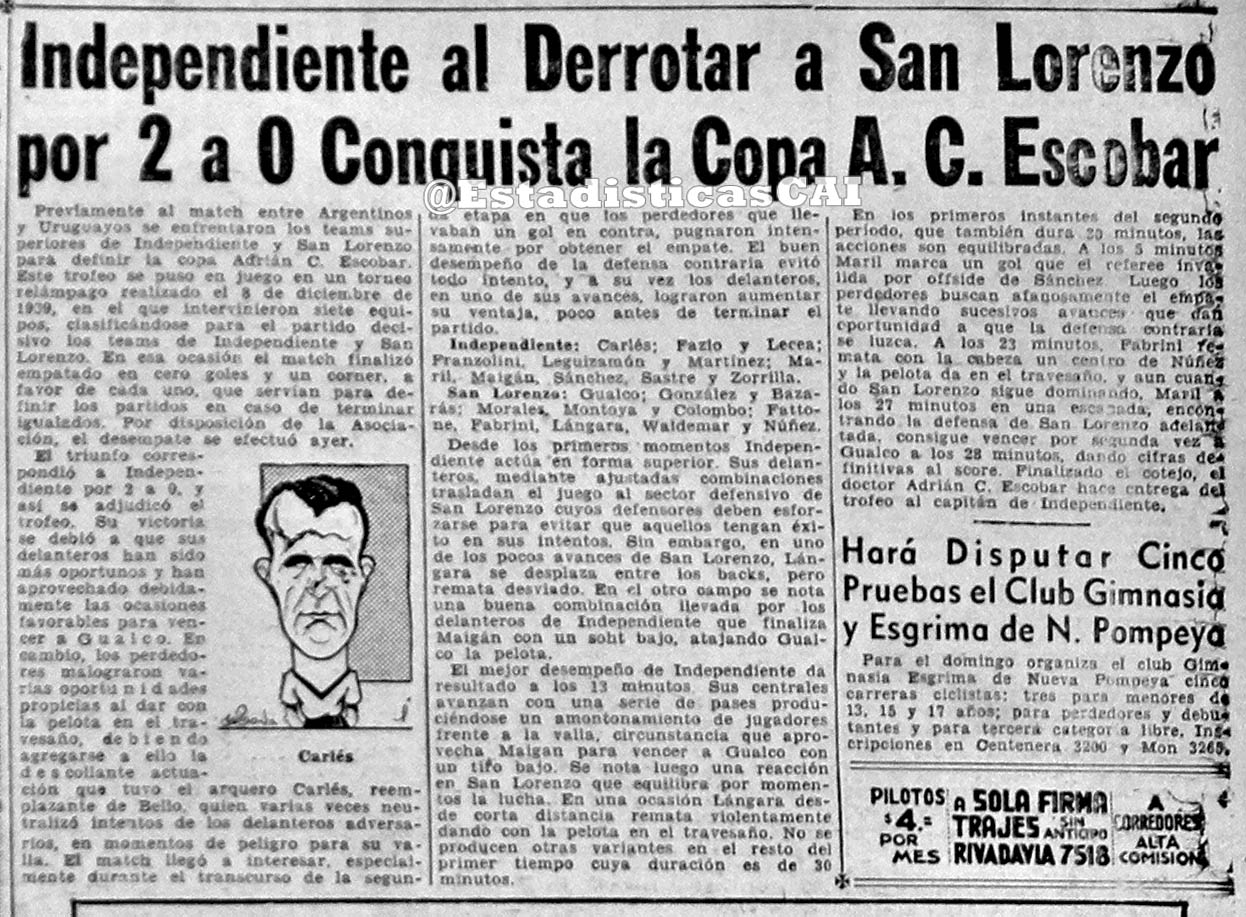
Chronicle of the final

1939 Copa Adrián C. Escobar Final
8 December 1939
Playoff

| Independiente | 2–0 | San Lorenzo |
|---|---|---|
| Maigán 13'; Maril 73' | Report 1 Report 2 (players) |

River Plate, Buenos Aires
Referee: H. Dottori

| Independiente | San Lorenzo |

| GK | (Argentina) José Carlés |
| DF | (Argentina) Luis Fazio |
| DF | (Spain) Fermín Lecea |
| MF | (Argentina) Luis Franzolini |
| MF | (Argentina) Raúl Leguizamón |
| MF | (Argentina) Celestino Martínez |
| FW | (Argentina) Juan J. Maril |
| FW | (Argentina) E. Maigán |
| FW | (Argentina) A. Sánchez |
| FW | (Argentina) Antonio Sastre |
| FW | (Argentina) José Zorrilla |
Manager:
(Argentina) Guillermo Ronzoni

| GK | (Argentina) Sebastián Gualco |
| DF | (Argentina) Ernesto González |
| DF | (Argentina) Pablo Bazarás |
| MF | (Argentina) David Morales |
| MF | (Argentina) Alfredo Montoya |
| MF | (Argentina) Bartolomé Colombo |
| FW | (Argentina) Juan Fattoni |
| FW | (Argentina) José Fabrini |
| FW | (Spain) Isidro Lángara |
| FW | (Brazil) Waldemar de Brito |
| FW | (Argentina) Antonio Núñez |
Manager:
(Argentina) Atilio Giuliano (Note: San Lorenzo had three different coaches in 1939, Adolfo Celli, Guillermo Stábile and Giuliano. The date of their tenures in unclear but it is believed that Giuliano was the coach by that time.)
