= Thaiel Peralta =

Argentine footballer (born 2008)

Personal information
- Full name: Thaiel Ezequiel Peralta Ortiz
- Date of birth: 21 September 2008 (age 18)
- Place of birth: Buenos Aires, Argentina
- Height: 1.72 m (5 ft 8 in)
- Position: Winger

Team information
- Current team: Huracán
- Number: 23

Youth career
- Huracán

Senior career*
Years	Team	Apps	(Gls)
2025–	Huracán	11	(2)
- * Club domestic league appearances and goals as of 18 April 2026

Thaiel Ezequiel Peralta Ortiz (born 21 September 2008) is an Argentine professional footballer who plays as a midfielder for Huracán.

== Club career ==
Born in Buenos Aires, Peralta is a youth product of Huracán.

He started training with the first team on the summer 2025.

Peralta made his professional debut with Huracán in a 1–0 Primera División win over Banfield on 5 October 2025.

He signed his first professional contract with the club from the Argentine Primera División in December 2025.

He scored his first goals on 3 March 2026, with a brace against Belgrano in a 3–1 home league win.
