= Eduardo Rodríguez (Argentine footballer) =

Argentine footballer

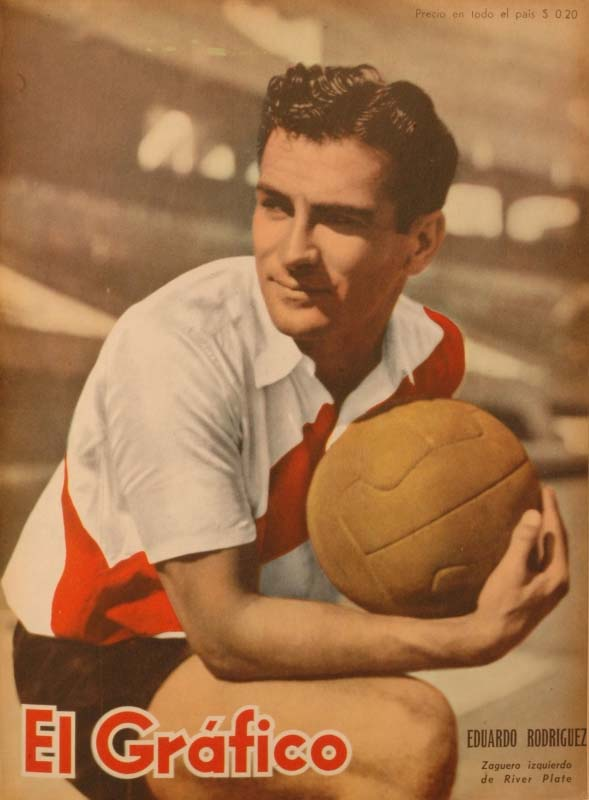

Personal information
- Full name: Eduardo Enrique Rodríguez
- Date of birth: 20 March 1918
- Place of birth: Reconquista, Argentina
- Date of death: 25 March 2000 (aged 82)
- Position: Defender

International career
Years	Team	Apps	(Gls)
1943–1945	Argentina	3	(0)

Eduardo Rodríguez (20 March 1918 – 25 March 2000) was an Argentine footballer. He played in three matches for the Argentina national football team from 1943 to 1945. He was also part of Argentina's squad for the 1946 South American Championship.

== Honours ==
Unión de Santa Fe

- Liga Santafesina de Fútbol: 1937 Preparacion, 1938, 1938 Honor

Estudiantes

- Copa Adrián C. Escobar: 1944

River Plate

- Argentine Primera División: 1945, 1947
- Copa Aldao: 1947
- South American Championship of Champions runner-up: 1948

Argentina

- Copa América: 1946
