= José María Moreno Carrascal =

Spanish poet, translator, and professor (born 1951)

José María Moreno Carrascal (Spanish pronunciation: [xoˈse maˈɾia moˈɾeno karasˈkal]; born 6 October 1951) is a Spanish poet, translator, and teacher.

== Biography and career ==
=== Early years ===
José María Moreno Carrascal was born in 1951 in Ayerbe (Aragón), [Spain] of Estramaduran parents. After living for three years in Cangas de Onís [Asturias], in 1956 his family relocated to Sanlúcar la Mayor [Andalucia, a region where his parents had lived for two decades]. He attended the local Catholic elementary schools in these two towns. In 1961 his family moved to Seville.

=== Education ===
During the 1960s he completed his secondary school education in the Instituto "San Isidoro" (I.E.S. San Isidoro), Sevilla. In the summer of 1967, he toured Morocco with a group of fellow students. The following year he lived and studied in East Aurora, New York, after being granted a scholarship by the international youth organization American Field Service. In 1970 he began his undergraduate studies at the Facultad de Filosofía y Letras in the University of Seville and started the first of a two-year study at the Seville Conservatory of Music and Drama (Conservatorio y Escuela de Arte Dramático). In 1972 he transferred to the University of Granada where he completed his degree in English Philology (Licenciado en Filología Inglesa).

=== Career ===
After living in New Orleans (USA) for two years, he returned to the Spanish Andalusian towns of Arcos de la Frontera (where, for a period of three years, he worked at the local public secondary school as a Spanish Literature and English teacher) and Rota (where he worked as an English teacher until October 2011). He also had a chance, during the last years of his active career as an educator in Spain, to teach and coordinate adult education language hybrid classes. He began to publish his literary translations and poems during the second half of the nineteen seventies and early eighties. In the academic year 1982-1983 he lived in London, England, teaching Spanish at The Prince Regent Comprehensive School. Back in Spain, during the school years 1984-1986, he took postgraduate courses in Spanish and English Literature and Literary Criticism at the University of Cádiz and, years later (1997–1999), at UNED (Universidad Nacional de Educación a Distancia), Madrid, where, in 2010, he defended his Doctoral Thesis entitled Self and Modernism: A study of the Poetry of D. H. Lawrence(Self y Modernidad.La poesía de David Herbert Lawrence) which obtained the qualification of summa cum laude and was awarded Premio Extraordinario de Doctorado. Moving back to the USA, he became an adjunct professor during the school year 2012-2013, teaching Spanish in the Department of Romance Languages and World Literature in the Augustine and Culture Seminar at Villanova University (Pennsylvania). In 2015 he, along with his wife and young son, moved south, to the state of Florida, where he taught English Composition and North-American and World Literature as an instructor for Southern State University, at CCA (Calvary Christian Academy), Ormond Beach, and Spanish language in the Department of World Languages and Cultures at Stetson University, DeLand. He has also worked as an on- call language instructor for L-3 Communications in San Antonio, Texas, and Miami, Florida. In 2017 he obtained a full time position as Associate Professor of English Literature, teaching undergraduate courses in English Literature, English Composition, Poetry, Linguistics and Spanish language in the department of English and World Languages at BCU (Bethune Cookman University) the Historical Black University located in Daytona Beach, Fl.

He has travelled extensively through many European countries (occasionally working for short periods of time, mostly during the summers, in countries like Denmark and Austria), Morocco, Turkey, North America and Central America. He retired in May 2023 and is now living most of the year in Ormond Beach, Florida, spending sometime in Jerez de la Frontera, Spain.

His translations and studies of mostly English and American poets have been published in book form by different Spanish publishers (Renacimiento, Edinexus, Visor, Pre-Textos) as well as in literary and academic periodicals and magazines (Estafeta Literaria, Fin de Siglo, Clarín, Condados de Niebla, Revista Atlántica de Poesía, Demófilo, Isla de Siltolá, Atlantis, etc.), some of which have also included his own poetical works. In the year 2010 his book of poems Los Jardines de Hielo received an accesit in the International Poetry Award given by the Ecoem Foundation in Seville, Spain, and in 2012 his collection of poems Los Reinos Diminutos won the 27th Unicaja International Poetry Award. His last poetry collection in Spanish, Océano en medio, was published in 2018 in Seville, Spain. Some of his poems have been published in Chile (in Spanish) and in English in the USA.

== Bibliography and awards ==
=== Book translations ===
- (1998) Poems,(David Herbert Lawrence ) Editorial Renacimiento, Bilingual edition with introduction and notes by Jose Maria Moreno Carrascal, 1998 Sevilla ISBN 978-84-89371-52-1
- (2002) Poems (John Updike) Editorial Pre-Textos, Bilingual edition with introduction and notes by Jose Maria Moreno Carrascal, Preface by Jonh Updike, Valencia - ISBN 978-84-8191-476-4
- (1999) Serranía de Ronda (Felipe Benítez Reyes). English text.Edinexus multimedia, Marbella, 1999 ISBN 978-84-605-9787-2
- (2001- 2002) The Roominghouse Madrigals: Early Selected Poems Editorial Visor, Madrid. ISBN 978-0-87685-733-5 (Charles Bukowski)
- (2015) En un tranvía español y otros poemas (David Herbert Lawrence ) Editorial Renacimiento, Bilingual edition with introduction and note by Jose Maria Moreno Carrascal, Sevilla ISBN 978-84-16246-55-7
- (2020)"Laughable Critters and Spooks",(María Antonia Carrascal) English version of "Poemas Terrorísticos.Poemas para niños, Sevilla

=== Doctoral Thesis ===
Self y modernidad: la poesía de David Herbert Lawrence. Reivindicación de una poética minusvalorada en el canon modernista en lengua inglesa. UNED, Madrid. Facultad de Filologías. 2009. Summa cum Laude. Premio extraordinario

=== Books of Poetry. Awards ===
- (2010) Los Jardines de Hielo. Accesit in the International Poetry Award by Ecoem Foundation.
- (2012) Los Reinos Diminutos. 27th Unicaja International Poetry Award.
- (2018) Océano en medio, Editorial Renacimiento, Sevilla

=== Own Poetry, Poetry Translations in Literay Magazines. Articles. Reviews ===
+ (2023) Jose María Moreno Carrascal, "Kindling Literary Review", Spring 2023 Edition, Bethune Cookman University. English versions of some of his Spanish poems pp 44–46. + José María M. Carrascal, “Space as a narrative constant in three Andalusian novels”, English version of “El espacio, una constante en la narrativa en tres novelas andaluzas” by Jose Juan Yborra Aznar, en Cauce, Revista Internacional de Filología V. 44, 2021 pp. 147 168 https://issuu.com/librosdelaherida/docs/narrativa_andaluza_jos_juan_yborra_versi_n_en_ing

+ Jose Maria Moreno Carrascal, Review of "Eras la Noche", novel by Ramón Pérez Montero, https://librosdelaherida.blogspot.com/2021/04/resena-de-eras-la-noche-writer-as.html

+ José María M. Carrascal, Selección de poemas de Jean Tooomer; “Sentado en mi habitación y otros poemas” . Versión y nota, Clarin. Revista de Literatura, Nº 155 • Julio-Agosto de 2021 •(pp. 46– 52). ISSN: 1136-1182.

+José M. Moreno Carrascal, “Eva Angelical” by Jean Toomer. Traducción y nota de (pp25–26) Anáfora. Creación y Crítica, Julio 2021, ISSN 2444-9504.

+ José María Moreno Carrascal Selecciómn de poemas de Alda Merini (Introduction and translation from the original Italian), "Poesía, dolor y fama", Clarín, Revista de Nueva Literatura, November–December, 2014, nº,114, pp. 14–20, Oviedo, Spain.

+ José María Moreno Carrascal, Review in English of "El Despertar" Kate Chopin, edited and translated by Eulalia Gil Piñero Cátedra, Madrid, 2012, ATLANTIS. Journal of the Spanish Association of Anglo-American Studies, 36.1 (June 2014):pp. 185–189.

+ José María Moreno Carrascal, Poemas, El Insular, Castro, Chile, 29 de enero, 2014

+ José María Moreno Carrascal (Introduction and translation), "Entre la celebración y lo elegíaco. Tres poetas norteamericanas de hoy: Kay Ryan, Sandra Gilbert y Joyce Carol Oates", Clarín, Revista de Nueva Literatura, September–October, 2012, nº 101, pp. 25–36, Oviedo, Spain, 2013

+ José María Moreno Carrascal, «Self» y Sociedad en la Secuencia Poética «Transformations» de D. H. Lawrence, EPOS, Revista de Filología, Facultad de Filología, Universidad Nacional a Distancia, nº xxvii, pp. 217–224, Madrid, 2012

+ José María Moreno Carrascal, “Poemas”, Isla de Siltolá, Revista de Poesía, nº 4, Sevilla, 2011

+ José María Moreno Carrascal, “Poemas”, Isla de Siltolá, Revista de Poesía, nº 2, Sevilla, 2010

+ "La LOGSE o el abandono de una pedagogía del esfuerzo" Escuela Española, June 1, 2000 and El Mundo, Madrid, June 16, 2000.

+ (John Updike), "Poemas" (Introduction and translation), Clarín, Revista de Nueva Literatura, nº 20, Oviedo, 1999.

+ (Vladimir Nabokov), "Poemas "(translation by José María Moreno Carrascal and Felipe Benítez Reyes, "El Cultural", Revista de Literatura y Arte del diario El Mundo, Madrid,4. 18. 1999.

+ Review of Flamenco, Passion, Politics and Popular Culture, Berg, Oxford– Washington D.C., 1996, in Demófilo, Revista de Cultura de Cultura de la Junta de Andalucía, nº 24, Seville, 1998.

+ Jason Weiss, "Cuatro Poemas".(Introduction and translation) Revista Atlántica de Poesía, nº 13, 1997, Cádiz.

+ William Stanley Merwin, "Poemas", (Introduction and translation), Revista Atlántica de Poesía, nº 11, 1996, Cádiz.

+ Clayton Eshleman, "Poemas", (Introduction and translation)Revista Atlántica de Poesía, nº 10, 1995, Cádiz.

+ (John Updike),"Poemas" (Introduction and translation), Revista Atlántica de Poesía, nº 9, 1995, Cádiz.

+ (Clayton Eshleman), "Poemas "(Introduction and translation), Revista Atlántica de Poesía, nº 10, 1995, Cádiz.

+ (William Carlos Williams), "Poemas "(Introduction and translation), Revista Atlántica de Poesía, nº 10, 1995, Cádiz.

+ Wallace Stevens, "Poemas".(Introduction and translation), Revista Atlántica de Poesía, nº 6, 1993, Cádiz.

+ (Charles Bukowski, "Poemas" (Translation), Condados de Niebla, Revista de Literatura, Diputación Provincial de Huelva, nº 9-10, Huelva 1990.

+ "Acting it out", in EDUCA, Revista de Educación de la Consejería de Educación y Ciencia de Cádiz, Cádiz, nº 19, 1989. + (Henry Miller, "Rimbaud (I, II) (from The Times of the Assassins), (Translation), Fin de siglo, Revista de Literatura, nº 0, 1, Jerez de la Frontera, 1982.

+ (David Herbert Lawrence),"Poemas" (Introduction and translation), Cuadernos de Cera, nº 5, Rota, 1981.

+ (David Herbert Lawrence ), "Tres Poemas" (Translation), Nueva Estafeta Literaria, nº 19, Madrid,1980.

+ "Siete Poemas de David Herbert Lawrence "(Introduction and translation) Pandero, Revista de Literatura, nº 6, Rota, 1980.
