= Superliga Argentina (association) =

Argentine sports association (2017-2020)

Superliga Argentina de Fútbol
- Formation: 27 July 2017
- Founded at: Buenos Aires
- Dissolved: 28 April 2020; 6 years ago
- Type: Sports association
- Headquarters: Buenos Aires
- Region served: Argentina
- Members: 24 clubs (Note: All clubs playing in Primera División)
- President: Marcelo Elizondo
- Parent organization: AFA
- Website: saf.com.ar

The Superliga Argentina de Fútbol, (officially "Superliga Profesional del Fútbol Argentino") was an Argentine sports association responsible for administering the main professional league of Argentine football, the Primera División, between 2017 and 2020. The Superliga was contractually bound to the Argentine Football Association, although it operated as an autonomous body and had its own statute.

As well as the Primera División championships, the body also created and organised two domestic cup competitions, the Copa de la Superliga and Trofeo de Campeones,

== History ==
In 2016, the Association approved the creation of a new entity, named "Superliga Argentina de Fútbol", which would take over the organisation of the two main leagues in Argentine football, Primera División and Primera B Nacional championships. The new entity was officially registered on 4 November 2016. Nevertheless, in February 2017, the AFA modified its statute, giving Superliga rights to organise only the Primera División tournaments and excluding Primera B Nacional, which remained organised by the main body.

The main football leagues of Europe (such as English Premier League or Spanish La Liga, organised by associations dedicated exclusively to that championships and operating as separate entities from their respective National Associations) served as inspiration for the creation of the Superliga.

The 2016–17 Primera División championship was the last tournament organised by the AFA. From the 2017–18 season, the "Superliga Argentina" took over the organisation of Primera División championships since then on. Therefore, the AFA focused on the lower divisions of Argentine league system (from Primera B Nacional to Torneo Regional Federal and Primera D), including domestic cups and all the Argentina national teams.

The Superliga, through the Board of Directors and with the advice of the Competencies Management, was the only competent entity to establish all the obligations, guidelines and instructions that must be met by the participating clubs of Primera División on all aspects of the tournament, including those relating to protocol, commercial rights, advertising, press, accreditations.

The SAF also awarded winning teams with trophies especially created for the occasion. For instance, the Primera División cup was designed by renowned goldsmith Adrián Pallarols. Apart from the trophy for the winning team, commemorative medals were also launched to award their players. The first club being awarded with the trophy was Boca Juniors as 2017–18 champion.

In February 2020, President of AFA Claudio Tapia stated that the Superliga had been established to position Argentine football as a product, but it failed in that purpose. As a result, AFA would take over the organisation of Primera División championships, according with Tapia's statement. One month after those announcements, the president of the Superliga, Mariano Elizondo, resigned.

The Superliga was replaced by a similar body, named "Liga Profesional de Fútbol", directly linked to AFA and presided by Marcelo Tinelli. It was expected that Superliga would be dissolved once the 2020 edition of Copa de la Superliga Argentina finished, but due to COVID-19 pandemic the cup was cancelled, accelerating times. In May 2020, the LPF was launched by the AFA.

== Additional competitions ==
In 2018, the creation of a new competition, the "Copa de la Superliga Argentina" (Superliga Argentina Cup) was announced. It will be an official competition similar to domestic cup, with a format similar to Copa Argentina in a knock-out system with all the matches being held in neutral locations.

The cup was contested by teams participating in Primera División. The six best placed teams directly qualified to the round of 16 while the 20 remaining played a preliminary round. All the matches were played in a two-legged series with the exception of the final. The winning team played the Copa Libertadores while the runner-up was eligible for the Copa Sudamericana.

The other competition created by the body was the Trofeo de Campeones de la Superliga Argentina. The annual football match was played for the first time in 2019, being contested by the reigning champions of Primera División and Copa de la Superliga respectively.

== Competitions ==
List of competitions organized by Superliga Argentina de Fútbol:

Name	Tenure
Primera División	2017–2020 (Note: In fact, the first official "Primera División" championship was held in 1891 and organized by a precedent association, "Argentine Association Football League", dissolved at the end of the season. Since the 2017–18, Primera División is organised by the Superliga Argentina de Fútbol.)
Copa de la Superliga	2019–2020
Trofeo de Campeones	2019

== See also ==
- Primera División
- Argentine Football Association
