= 1942 Copa Adrián Escobar final =

1942 Copa Adrián C. Escobar Final
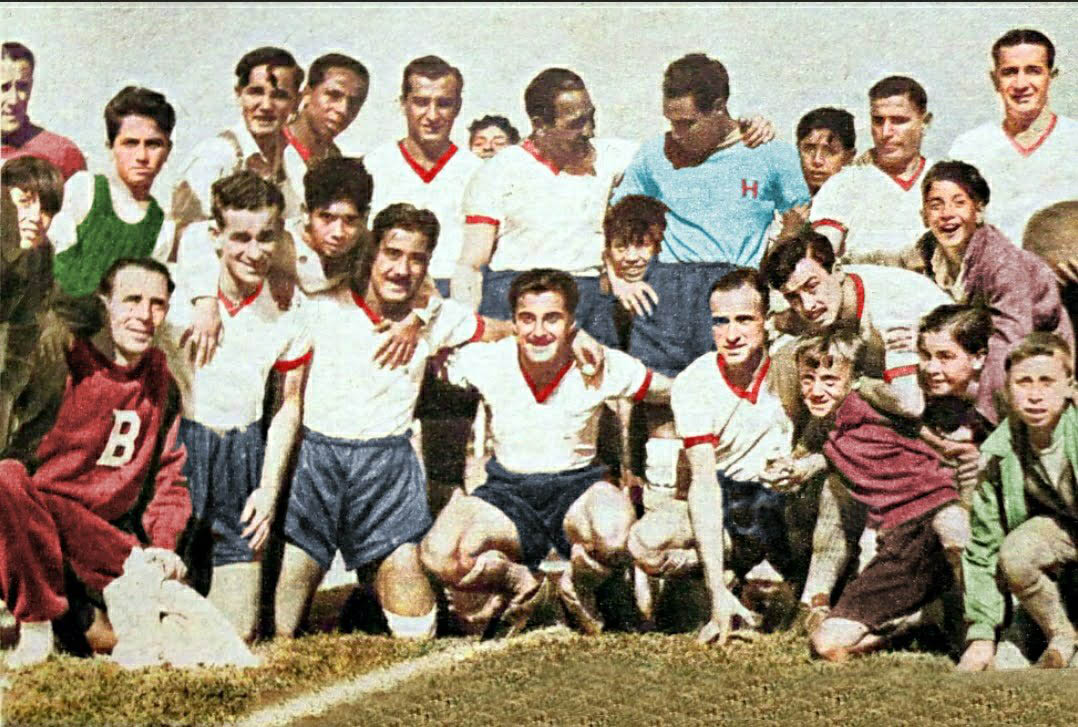
- Huracán, champions
- Event: Copa Adrián C. Escobar
River Plate	Huracán
0	2
- Date: December 1, 1942
- Venue: River Plate
- Referee: Bartolomé Macías

The 1942 Copa Adrián C. Escober Final was the final that decided the winner of the 3rd edition of the Copa Adrián C. Escobar, an Argentine domestic cup organised by the Argentine Football Association. The match was contested by the two teams that had played in the previous final, River Plate and Huracán.

The final was held in River Plate Stadium on December 1, 1942. Huracán defeating River Plate 2–0 and winning their first Copa Escobar trophy.

== Qualified teams ==
Team	Previous finals app.
River Plate	**1941**
Huracán	1941

Bold indicates winning years

== Overview ==
This edition was contested by the seven best placed teams of the 1942 Primera División season. River Plate, as champion, advanced directly to semifinals. The matches only lasted 40 minutes (two halves of 20' each), with some teams playing two games a day. All the matches were held in River Plate Stadium.

In the tournament, Huracán beat Newell's Old Boys (4–2 on corner kicks awarded after finishing 0–0) and then beat rival San Lorenzo de Almagro (1–0 in extra time).

== Road to the final ==
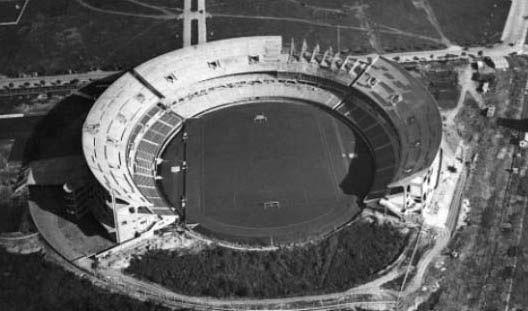
Estadio Monumental hosted the final

Note: all the quarterfinal matches were held in San Lorenzo Stadium, while the semifinals were held in River Plate Stadium

River Plate		Round	Huracán	
Opponent	Result	Group stage	Opponent	Result
– (Note: As Primera División champion, River advanced directly to semifinals.)		Quarter final	Newell's Old Boys	0–0 (4–2, c)
Boca Juniors	0–0 (3–2, c)	Semifinal	San Lorenzo	1–0 (a.e.t.)

== Match details ==
1942 Copa Adrián C. Escobar Final
December 1, 1942
Final

River Plate	0–2	Huracán
	Report	Giúdice 14'; Alberti 32'

River Plate, Buenos Aires
Referee: Bartolomé Macías

**River Plate**	**Huracán**

GK	(Argentina) Sebastián Sirni
DF	(Argentina) José Pérez
DF	(Argentina) Luis A. Ferreyra
MF	(Argentina) José Díaz
MF	(Argentina) Fernando Sánchez
MF	(Argentina) José Ramos
FW	(Argentina) Roberto D'Alessandro
FW	(Argentina) Alberto Gallo
FW	(Argentina) Roberto Aballay
FW	(Argentina) José Manuel Moreno
FW	(Argentina) Félix Loustau
Manager:
(Argentina) Renato Cesarini

GK	(Argentina) Bruno Barrionuevo
DF	(Argentina) Carlos Marinelli
DF	(Argentina) Jorge Alberti
MF	(Argentina) Victorio Ádamo
MF	(Argentina) Manuel Giúdice
MF	(Argentina) Jorge Titonell
FW	(Argentina) Juan Salvini
FW	(Argentina) Norberto Méndez
FW	(Argentina) Ramón F. Guerra
FW	(Argentina) Emilio Baldonedo
FW	(Argentina) Delfín Unzué
Manager:
(Argentina) Pablo Bartolucci
