= TNT Sports (Argentina) =

Sports channel

TNT Sports Argentina
- Country: Argentina
- Broadcast area: Argentina; Bolivia; Colombia; Paraguay; Uruguay; Venezuela; Dominican Republic; Central America
- Headquarters: Buenos Aires, Argentina

Programming
- Picture format: 1080i HDTV (downscaled to 16:9 576i for the SDTV feed)

Ownership
- Owner: TNT Sports International (Skydance Corporation)
- Sister channels: Golf Channel; TNT; TNT Series; TNT Sports (Chilean TV channel); TNT Sports (Brazil)

History
- Launched: 25 August 2017; 9 years ago

Links
- Website: tntsports.com.ar

Availability

Terrestrial
- Antina: Channel 201 (HD)

Streaming media
- Estadio TNT Sports: Watch live

TNT Sports Argentina is a subscription sports television channel by Skydance Corporation under their TNT Sports International division available in Argentina. It is mainly dedicated to the broadcast of the Argentine Primera División, along with ESPN Premium. The channel began broadcasting on Friday, August 25, 2017, from 6:00 p.m., after the alliance of Turner and Fox by the television rights of the Argentine First Division of Argentine soccer, being replacement of the governmental program Fútbol para Todos.

== History ==
The channel broadcasts half of the matches of each date of the Argentine Primera División and the rest of the deferred matches, which are produced by Tournaments. The channel's studios are located in La Corte, the audiovisual production company belonging to the Ceibo Group that was responsible for making the broadcasts of Fútbol para Todos since 2009 until 2017.

Journalists of TNT Sports interview Lourdes Perez to Las Leoncitas national team after the women's hockey final at the 2018 Youth Olympic Games in Buenos Aires. The channel has a similarity with the former TyC organization, since it costs a price per month to watch the games.

== Coverage ==
=== Current ===
==== Broadcasting rights ====
===== Football (including futsal and beach soccer) =====
- FIFA Club World Cup (all matches exclusively live in 2019 and 2020, also available for Chile viewers via TNT Sports Chile)
- L'Alcúdia International Football Tournament
- Futbol de Verano
- AFA
  - Primera División de Argentina
  - Copa de la Liga Profesional
  - Campeonato de Futsal
  - Supercopa de Futsal
  - Supercopa Argentina
- Primera División de Chile
  - Euro 2020

===== Basketball =====
- FIBA Intercontinental Cup

===== Padel =====
- World Padel Tour

==== Programs ====
- Futsal Libre TV
- Fútbol femenino
- Clásico BBVA
- La previa
- Lo mejor de la Fecha
- TNT al límite
- TNT Box (TRB Boxeo e Internacionales)
- TNT Data Sports
- TNT Play Sports
- TNT Gol
- Club Atlético TNT
- Halcones y palomas
- Tres Arriba
- Primera Tapa
- Pelota al Piso
- De memoria
- Último hombre
- Nos falta un jugador
- Generación E: Desafío eco YPF
- Sueño Dorado
- Tarde de campeones
- Lo mejor de la fecha
- Fútbol a la carta
- Estadio TNT Sports
- La fecha TNT
- Interior futbolero
- Mundo Padel
- Historias de El Gráfico
- La Pasión… según Sacheri
- Artistas del Knockout
- CNN Deportes Radio

=== Former ===
==== Broadcasting rights ====
===== Football (including futsal and beach soccer) =====
- Copa América Femenina (2018)
- Superliga Argentina de Fútbol
  - Copa de la Superliga

== Personnels ==
- (Argentina) Pablo Giralt
- (Argentina) Hernán Feler
- (Argentina) Alejandro Uriona
- (Argentina) Leandro Zapponi
- (Argentina) Fernando Lingiardi
- (Argentina) Ariel Helueni
- (Argentina) Arturo Bulián
- (Argentina) Leo Gentili
- (Argentina) Ignacio Fusco
- (Argentina) Matías Martin
- (Colombia) Carlos Fernando Navarro Montoya
- (Argentina) Fernando Pacini
- (Argentina) Juan Pablo Varsky
- (Argentina) Hernán Castillo
- (Argentina) Fabián Godoy
- (Argentina) Román Iucht
- (Argentina) Fernando Salceda
- (Argentina) Enrique Gastañaga
- (Argentina) Francisco Noriega
- (Argentina) Manuel Olivari
- (Argentina) Antonella Valderrey
- (Argentina) Ángela Lerena
- (Argentina) Emiliano Espinoza
- (Argentina) Gonzalo Rey
- (Argentina) Federico Rodas
- (Argentina) Nicolás Haase
- (Argentina) Ignacio Bezruk
- (Argentina) Maximiliano Grillo
- (Argentina) Nicolás Fazio
- (Argentina) Nicolás Latini
- (Argentina) Diego Olave
- (Argentina) Juan Pablo Vila
- (Argentina) Nicolás Distasio
- (Argentina) Diego Provenzano
- (Argentina) Sebastián Larroca
- (Argentina) Juani Majluf
- (Argentina) Diego Della Sala
- (Argentina) Martín Costa
- (Argentina) Veronica Brunati
- (Argentina) Paula Pallas
- (Argentina) Osvaldo Principi
- (Argentina) Guillermo Favale
- (Argentina) Daniel Guiñazú
- (Argentina) Leonardo Benatar
- (Argentina) Luis Rubio
- (Argentina) Rosario Cuenca
- (Argentina) Mariano Peluffo
- (Argentina) Magdalena Aicega
- (Argentina) Florencia Maignon
- (Argentina) María del Mar Onega
- (Argentina) Iván Núñez Pérez
- (Argentina) Augusto Sciutto
- (Argentina) Martín Smith
- (Argentina) Ivana Nadal
- (Argentina) Jorge Rinaldi
- (Argentina) Fernando Czyz
- (Argentina) Martín Castilla
- (Argentina) Santiago do Rego
- (Argentina) Micaela Vázquez
- (Argentina) Sebastián Di Nardo
- (Argentina) Kevin Aiello
- (Argentina) Eduardo Sacheri
- (Argentina) Matías Bustos Milla
- (Argentina) Chiche Almozny

== Logos ==
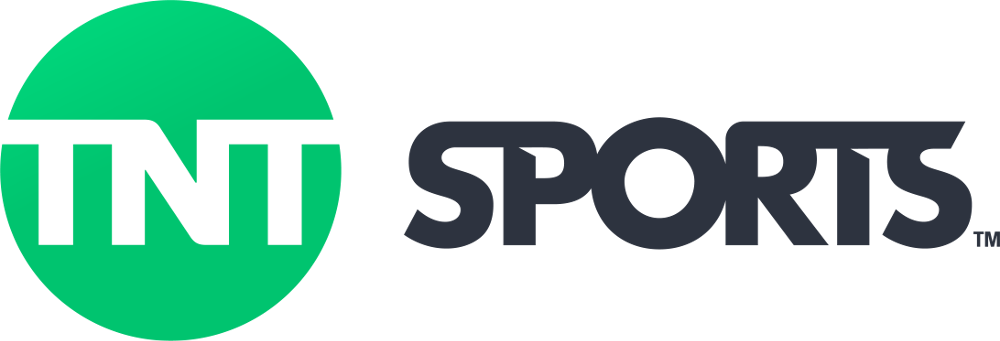
2017–2021

2021–2024

== See also ==
- ESPN (Latin America)
- Fox Sports (Latin America)
- TyC Sports
- Canal del Fútbol (Chile) (TNT Sports Chile)
- Esporte Interativo (TNT Sports Brazil)
