= Copa Adrián C. Escobar =

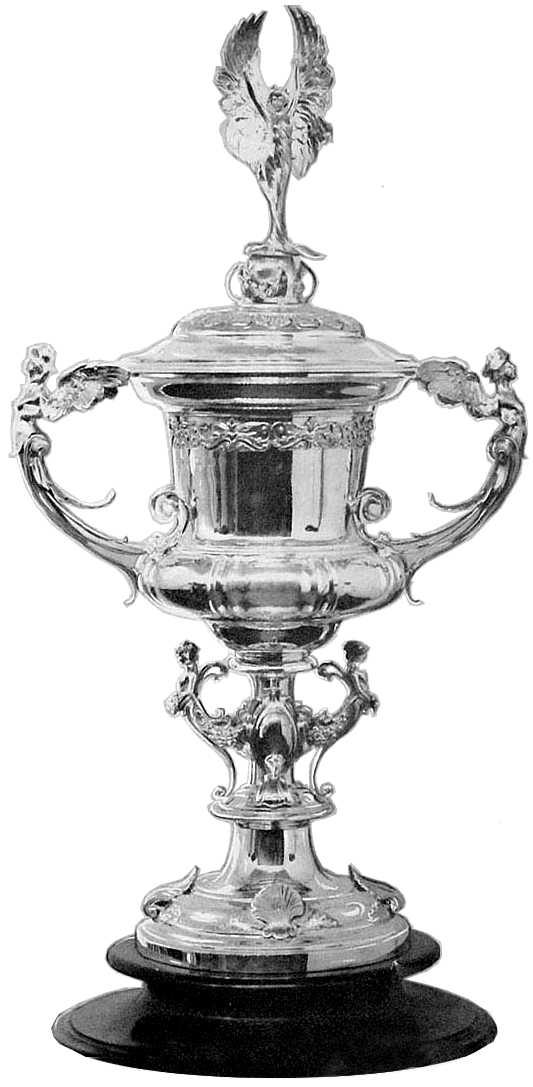
- The trophy awarded to champions
- Organiser(s): AFA
- Founded: 1939
- Abolished: 1949; 77 years ago
- Region: Argentina
- Teams: 7 (1949)
- Related competitions: Primera División
- Most championships: Huracán (2 titles)

The Copa Adrián C. Escobar was an official Argentine football cup competition contested by clubs of Argentina, organized by the Argentine Football Association (AFA) from 1939 to 1949.

The trophy of the tournament was donated by Adrián C. Escobar, president of the AFA in 1939, year in which the match was created. Therefore, the tournament was named after his donation.

Huracán is the most winning team of the competition, with 2 titles.

== Format ==
It was a heptagonal competition, competed by the seven best placed teams in the table of Primera División championship. A single knockout system was adopted. The second to seven competed in the quarter-finals, while the champions of the official league entered the semi-finals directly.

Matches in this tournament were not standard. In the 1939 edition, a match lasted for 20 minutes in the quarter-finals and semi-finals and 30 minutes for the final match. In the later editions, matches lasted for 40 minutes in every round. When matches were drawn, the team gaining the higher number of corner kicks would proceed to the next round. The matches in the same round were played in the same pitch on the same day.

== List of champions ==
The following list includes all the editions of the Copa Adrián C. Escobar:

Keys

- Final defined in a playoff match after both teams finished the group stage equaled on goals and corner kicks awarded.
- Winner defined by corner kicks awarded.

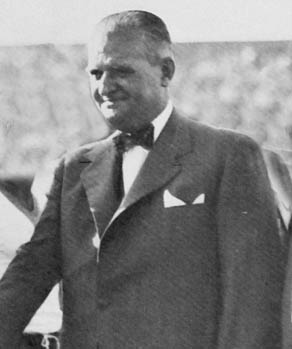
The trophy was named after Adrián C. Escobar, president of the Association by then

Ed.	Year	Champion	Score	Runner-up	Venue	City
1	1939	Independiente (1)	0–0 (1–1 c) (Note: After the regular time ended in a 0–0 draw and both teams also tied on corner kicks awarded, a playoff was scheduled.)	San Lorenzo	River Plate	Buenos Aires
1	1939	Independiente (1)	2–0	San Lorenzo	River Plate	Buenos Aires
2	1941	River Plate (1)	1–0	Huracán	River Plate	Buenos Aires
3	1942	Huracán (1)	2–0	River Plate	River Plate	Buenos Aires
4	1943	Huracán (2)	0–0 (4–1 c)	Platense	San Lorenzo	Buenos Aires
5	1944	Estudiantes (LP) (1)	1–0	San Lorenzo	San Lorenzo	Buenos Aires
6	1946	(abandoned on quarterfinals)				
7	1949	Newell's Old Boys (1)	2–2 (4–2 c)	Racing	Independiente	Avellaneda

=== Titles by team ===
Rank	Team	Titles	Years won
1	Huracán	2	1942, 1943
2	Independiente	1	1939
2	River Plate	1	1941
2	Estudiantes (LP)	1	1944
2	Newell's Old Boys	1	1949

=== Topscorers ===
Year	Player	Goals	Club
1941	(Argentina) Rinaldo Martino	2	San Lorenzo
1941	(Argentina) Ángel Labruna	2	River Plate
1942	(Argentina) Alfredo Borgnia	2	San Lorenzo
1944	(Argentina) Ricardo Infante	2	Estudiantes LP
1949	(Argentina) Elio Montaño	2	Newell's Old Boys
1949	(Argentina) Roque Olsen	2	Racing
