= Club Atlético Huracán =

Argentine sports club

Huracán
- Full name: Club Atlético Huracán
- Nicknames: Globo ("Balloon"); Quemeros ("Burners"); Los Albirrojos ("The red and whites")
- Founded: 1 November 1908; 118 years ago
- Ground: Estadio Tomás Adolfo Ducó
- Capacity: 48,340
- Chairman: Abel Poza
- Manager: Diego Martínez
- League: Primera División
- 2025: 12th of 30
- Website: cahuracan.com
Home colours	Away colours	Third colours

Club Atlético Huracán (Spanish pronunciation: [uɾaˈkan]) is an Argentine sports club from the Parque Patricios neighbourhood of Buenos Aires. The club is notable for its football team, that currently plays in the Primera División, the top level of the Argentine football league system. Its home stadium is the Estadio Tomás Adolfo Ducó.

Huracán was founded on 1 November 1908 in the Nueva Pompeya neighbourhood of Buenos Aires. The club's name and nickname (Globo, literally "Balloon") comes from the Huracán ("Hurricane") balloon flown by Jorge Newbery in 1909. Its supporters are called los Quemeros ("the Burners") because the stadium is located in a former garbage burning area.

Since its establishment, Huracán has won 13 domestic titles (including five Primera División championships, and most recently the 2014 Supercopa Argentina). Apart from those achievements, the team has finished as runner-up of the top division nine times (the last one in the 2025 Apertura). Huracán's historical rival is San Lorenzo de Almagro.

Other sports practised at the club are artistic gymnastics, boxing, field hockey, roller hockey, handball, martial arts and volleyball.

== History ==
=== First steps ===
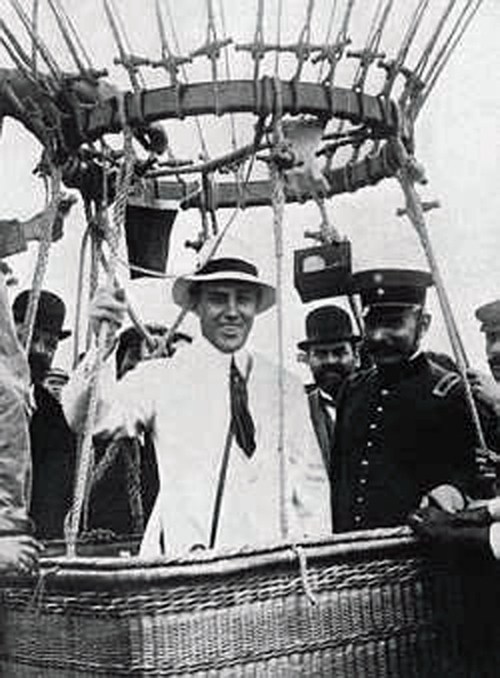
Jorge Newbery's balloon served as inspiration to the emblem.

On 25 May 1903, a group of boys from Nueva Pompeya, Buenos Aires, founded a football club under the name Los Chiquitos de Pompeya. In 1907 the name was changed to Verde esperanza y no pierde.

On 1 November 1908, a meeting was organised, and therefore the club was named "Club Atlético Huracán", according to club's certificates, signed by José Laguna as the first president of the institution. In that meeting the white color with a balloon emblem on the chest, was also established as club's jersey. This was established as the official foundation of Huracán. Likewise, the balloon emblem was a homage to Argentine aviation-pioneer Jorge Newbery's, which had been brought from France and first piloted by Newbery in 1909. The club asked Newbery for permission to use the balloon, which Newbery replied saying "I gave my most complete approval to the request, hoping that the team will honor the balloon that crossed three countries (Argentina, Uruguay and Brazil) in a unique trip". When Huracán reached the first division, the managers sent a letter to Jorge Newbery that said: "Huracán has kept its promise, promoting three divisions, as your balloon crossed three republiques before, so your wish was accomplished"

In 1910, Jorge Newbery was named "protector member" of the club. That same year Huracán played in the Liga 43, where 43 clubs from second and fourth divisions took part of the championship. Huracán played its first matches in a field located in Cachi and Traful streets. It was Jorge Newbery who got the lands on Arena street. Newbery also negotiated the affiliation of the club to Argentine Football Association. In 1912 Huracán debuted in the third division, which only allowed under-18 players to participate.

=== Primera División & golden age ===
Huracán reached the Argentine Primera División two years later, debuting in the top division on 29 March 1914, with a 4–2 over Ferro Carril Oeste. The team finished 6th of 13 with 4 games won, five lost and three drew. The following seasons, Huracán had good campaigns, even finishing third in 1917 and 1919. In 1920 the team had another great season, finishing runner-up to Boca Juniors but also winning its first title ever, the Copa Estímulo, awarded to the club after Banfield failed to turn up for the final game.

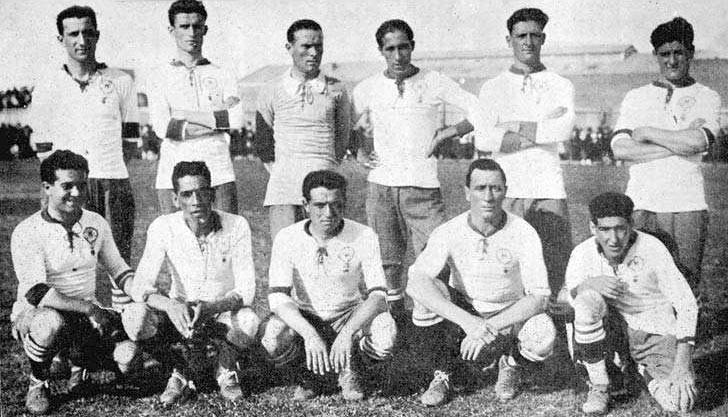
The 1921 team that won the first championship

The first league title (and the second in club's history) would be won a year later, when Huracán were crowned champions after a great campaign that included 14 victories and only one loss in 18 matches played. The team also scored 54 goals (an average of three per game). Huracán also had the topscorer of the tournament, Guillermo Dannaher with 23 goals.

Just one season after, Huracán won another championship, the 1922 Primera División, winning 13 of 16 matches played with only one loss. In 1923 the tournament was suspended with Huracán placed first and Boca Juniors in the second position. Therefore, both teams had to play a match in order to decide the championship, which was finally won by the Xeneize 2–0. That same year the club also won the Copa Dr. Carlos Ibarguren, defeating Newell's Old Boys by 1–0 after a 1–1 tie in the first match.

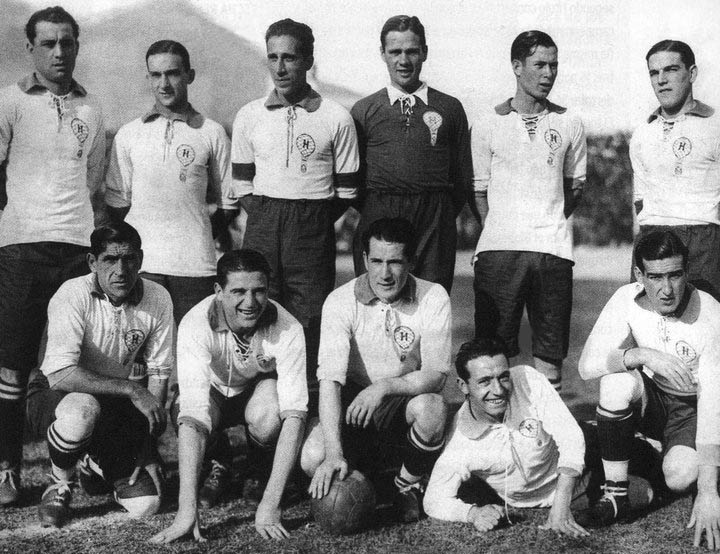
The 1925 Huracán team, champion that year.

The third Primera División title for the club came in 1925, after a playoff match where Huracán defeated Nueva Chicago due to both teams had finished in the first position at the end of the tournament. The playoff match was played at Sportivo Barracas stadium. Huracán had finished the regular season with 18 games won, two draws and one loss from 21 games played. The team scored 51 goals and conceded only 12. Huracán also won the Copa Dr. Ibarguren defeating Rosarino team Tiro Federal by 2–1 (goals by Stábile and Pratto).

The team had good campaigns during the successive years, and in 1928 Huracán won its fourth Primera División title, after a long season of 35 games played. Huracán won 28 games, with 2 drew and 5 lost, scoring 73 goals (far less than runners-up Boca Juniors who scored 100 goals with the same number of matches won). Some highlights for the team include vdictories over Boca Juniors (3–1), River Plate (2–0), Lanús (7–2). Guillermo Stábile was the team's topscorer with 24.

The team was one of the most successful teams during those years, winning four titles and always finishing in the top ten with the exception of 1930 when it was placed 14th. One of its most notable players was Guillermo Stábile, the club's top scorer before being traded to Genoa in 1930.

=== 1929–72 ===
Huracán did not achieve anything noteworthy during the first years of the professional era. In 1939, with Tomás Ducó as president, Huracán acquired the lands where the club would later built its facilities and stadium (later named "Tomás Ducó" honoring him). The works were completed in September 1947 with a celebration that included a friendly match against Boca Juniors.

In 1949 Huracán finished last along with Lanús so both teams had to play two matches in order to decide which team would be relegated to second division. After one victory each and a 3–3 draw, a fourth game had to be played, with Huracán winner with a score of 3–2, which relegated Lanús to Primera B.

Other important facts in club's history were the debuts of two notable players: Alfredo Di Stéfano in 1946 and Adolfo Pedernera in 1948.

During the decade of the 1950s Huracán came close to being relegated, but managed keep its place in the top division. Huracán defeated Tigre in 1950 and then beat Quilmes a year later. The most important achievement during those years was 3rd place in 1952, shared with Independiente.

In the decade of the 1960s Huracán did not have great campaigns, the club's best performance being 6th place in 1963. In 1967 a restructuring of the tournaments was carried out by the Football Association, creating the Metropolitano and Nacional championships. During the 1969 tournament, two historical players of the club, Miguel Brindisi and Carlos Babington played together for the first time.

=== The revolution of Menotti ===
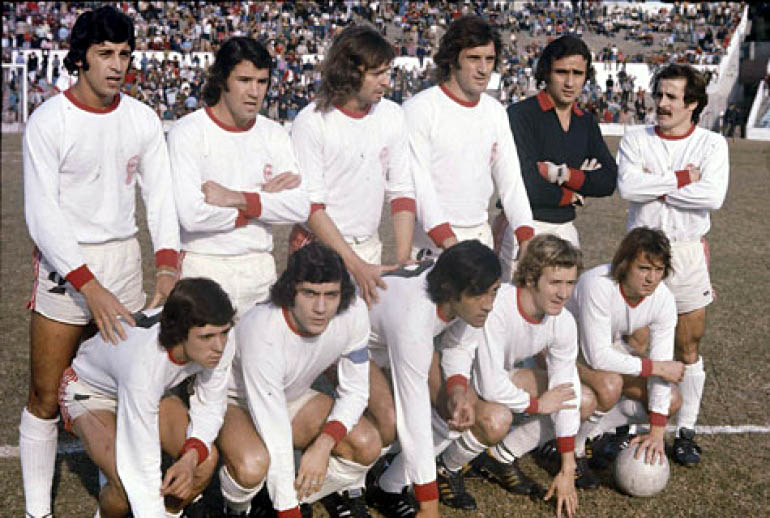
The Huracán squad that won its fifth league title in 1973

In 1971 César Menotti was hired as coach by then president Luis Seijo. Menotti started a process that ended successfully in 1973, when Huracán won its fifth league title in the club's history, nearly half a century after the last one, the 1973 Metropolitano championship. That squad is widely regarded as one of the best Argentine teams ever, with key players such as René Houseman, Carlos Babington, Miguel Brindisi, and Omar Larrosa.

I am convinced that all Argentine teams are capable of playing a style football that puts on a show; a joyful style of football, like the one Huracán plays

— César Menotti, 1973

The most frequent line-up of Huracán in 1973 was: Héctor Roganti, Nelson Chabay, Daniel Buglione, Alfio Basile, Jorge Carrascosa, Miguel Brindisi, Francisco Russo, Carlos Babington, René Houseman, Roque Avallay, and Omar Larrosa. The team finished with 46 points (four more than runners-up Boca Juniors) with 19 matches won and five losses.

With a team formed with most of the players that had won the title, Huracán reached the semifinals in the 1974 Copa Libertadores being later eliminated by Independiente (who would become champions) and Peñarol. In domestic competitions, Huracán was runner-up in the 1975 Metropolitano and 1976 Metropolitano. Some of the most notable players of that time were Osvaldo Ardiles and goalkeeper Héctor Baley, both of whom would win the 1978 World Cup playing for the Argentina national football team.

=== Relegations ===
The 1980s was not a good decade for the club. Huracán were relegated for the first time to the second division, Primera B Nacional in 1986. The team played four years there until it won promotion to Primera in 1990, being coached by former player and idol Carlos Babington. Some of its most notable players were Antonio Mohamed and Fernando Quiroz.

Coached by former player Héctor Cúper, Huracán was 1994 Torneo Clausura runner-up after a great campaign during that season, losing in the last fixture when the Parque Patricios' team was soundly defeated by Independiente (who became champions) 4–0, in a match played in Estadio Libertadores de América.

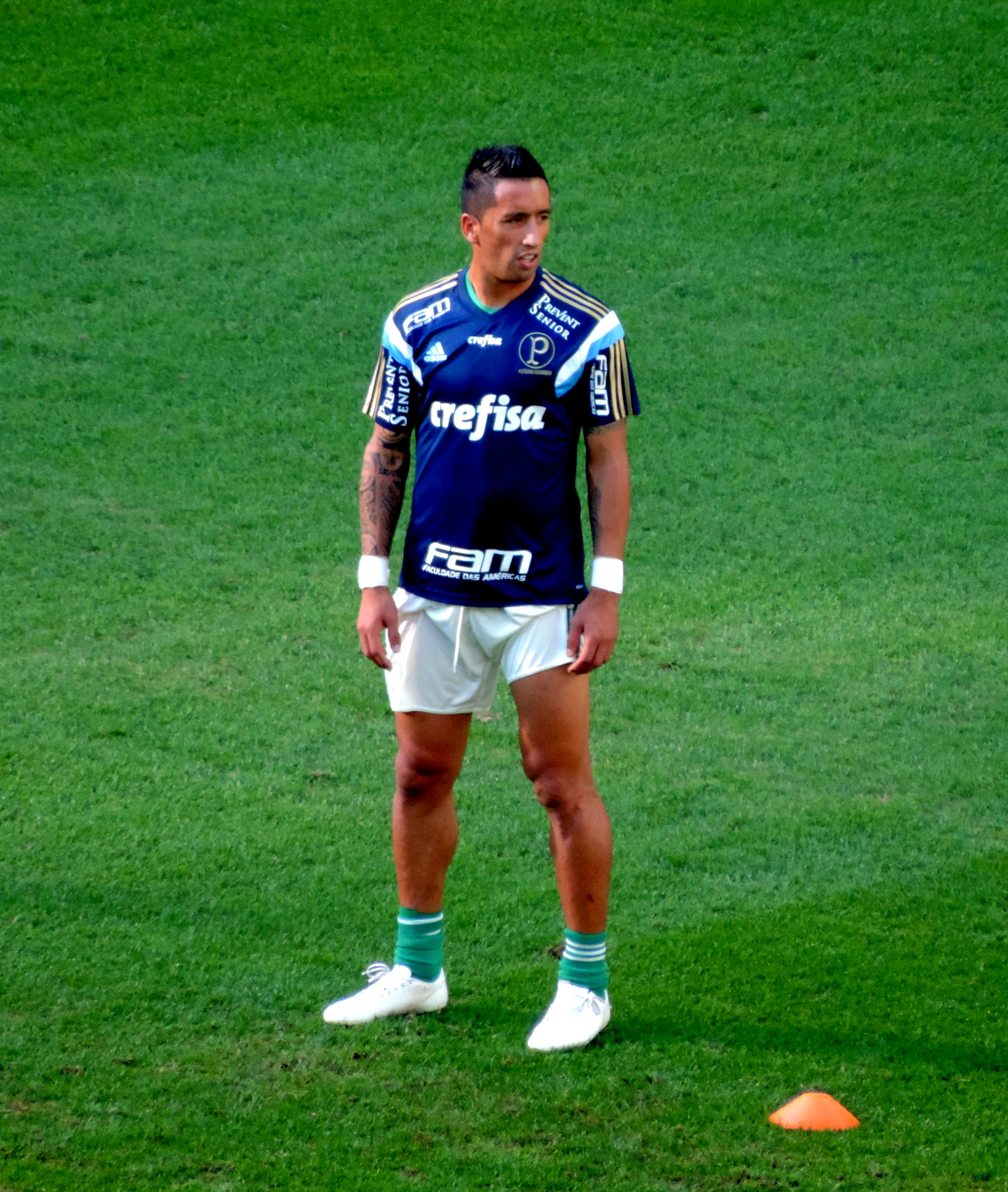
Lucas Barrios was formed at the club's youth academy

In 1999 Huracán was relegated to B Nacional again, although the club would be promoted one season later, coached by Babington again. A new crisis due to internal and financial problems led to relegation in 2003. The club spent four seasons in the B Nacional until 2007, when the club promoted to Primera after defeating Godoy Cruz in playoffs with scores of 2–0 in Parque Patricios and 3–2 in Mendoza. Huracán was coached by Antonio Mohamed, who had won a promotion as player some years earlier.

=== 2009 Clausura campaign ===
During the decade of the 2000s, Huracán was near to winning another title, more precisely in the 2009 Clausura, where the team, coached by Ángel Cappa, made a great campaign but lost the title at the hands of Vélez Sársfield in the last round of the tournament. Referee Gabriel Brazenas disallowed a goal scored by Eduardo Domínguez when the match was still 0–0.

Huracán finished the season placed 2nd with 38 points, the club's best position since the 1973 championship.

The second half of the 2009 season was a great disappointment for the club. Huracán finished near the bottom of the league in the following season and Cappa resigned as coach. After some poor campaigns, Miguel Brindisi was named coach by former player and manager Carlos Babington, who had become president. The results were not as good as expected and Brindisi was soon replaced by Roberto Pompei, who could not change the situation, and eventually Huracán were relegated to Nacional B in the 2010–11 season.

=== Return to success ===
In November 2014, after 41 years from its last official title, Huracán won the 2013–14 Copa Argentina when the team beat Rosario Central via a penalty shootout by 5–4 at the final, after regular time ended in a 0–0 draw. The squad had a great campaign finishing the tournament unbeaten with 6 games played, although most of its games were won via penalties. The line-up for the final was: Marcos Díaz; Erramuspe, Mancinelli, Domínguez, Arano, Villarruel; Vismara, Esponoza, Toranzo; G. Martínez, Abila.

The team returned to Argentina's Primera División league on 14 December 2014, after winning a one-game playoff against Atletico Tucuman, won 4–1. for the fifth place of Nacional's Group B.

On 25 April 2015, Huracan won the second domestic cup in just six months when they clinched the Supercopa Argentina after beating 2014 Torneo Final champions River Plate 1–0 at San Juan.

== Players ==
=== Current squad ===
As of 15 September 2026

Note: Flags indicate national team as defined under FIFA eligibility rules; some limited exceptions apply. Players may hold more than one non-FIFA nationality.

No.	Pos.	Nation	Player
1	GK	ECU	Hernán Galíndez (captain)
2	DF	SUI	Lucas Blondel (on loan from Boca Juniors)
3	DF	ARG	Lucas Carrizo
4	DF	ARG	Federico Vera (on loan from Independiente)
5	MF	URU	Rodrigo Fernández Cedrés (on loan from Independiente)
6	DF	ARG	Fabio Pereyra
7	FW	COL	Óscar Cortés (on loan from Rangers)
8	MF	CHI	Leonardo Gil
9	FW	ECU	Jordy Caicedo (on loan from Atlas)
10	MF	PAR	Óscar Romero
11	MF	ARG	Thaiel Peralta
15	MF	URU	Facundo Waller
17	FW	ARG	Juan Bisanz
19	DF	ARG	Leandro Lescano

No.	Pos.	Nation	Player
20	MF	ARG	Emmanuel Ojeda
21	DF	ARG	Hugo Nervo
22	DF	ARG	Daniel Zabala (on loan from River Plate)
23	FW	ARG	Ignacio Pussetto (on loan from Independiente)
25	DF	ARG	César Ibáñez
27	GK	ARG	Nazareno Durán
32	GK	ARG	Sebastián Meza
33	FW	CHI	Bruno Barticciotto (on loan from Talleres)
34	DF	ARG	Ignacio Campo
35	DF	ARG	Máximo Palazzo
41	MF	ARG	Lautaro Mora
49	FW	ARG	Tomás Uribe
52	MF	ARG	Facundo Kalinger

=== Other players under contract ===
Note: Flags indicate national team as defined under FIFA eligibility rules; some limited exceptions apply. Players may hold more than one non-FIFA nationality.

No.	Pos.	Nation	Player
34	MF	ARG	Santiago Luján
46	DF	ARG	Mauro Villar

=== Reserve squad ===
Note: Flags indicate national team as defined under FIFA eligibility rules; some limited exceptions apply. Players may hold more than one non-FIFA nationality.

No.	Pos.	Nation	Player
37	MF	ARG	Thiago Pérez

==== Out on loan ====
Note: Flags indicate national team as defined under FIFA eligibility rules; some limited exceptions apply. Players may hold more than one non-FIFA nationality.

No.	Pos.	Nation	Player
—	DF	ARG	Santiago Moya (at Aldosivi until 31 December 2026)
—	DF	ARG	Nehuén Paz (at Banfield until 31 December 2027)
—	MF	ARG	Luca Babino (at Fénix until 31 December 2027)
—	MF	ARG	Gabriel Alanís (at Estudiantes RC until 31 December 2026)
—	MF	ARG	Matías Gómez (at Los Andes until 31 December 2026)
—	MF	ARG	Milton Ríos (at San Martín de Tucumán until 31 December 2026)

No.	Pos.	Nation	Player
—	FW	ARG	Rodrigo Cabral (at Audax Italiano until 31 December 2026)
—	FW	ARG	Leandro Garate (at Colon until 31 December 2027)
—	FW	ARG	Sebastián Ramírez (at Chacarita Juniors until 31 December 2026)
—	FW	ARG	Leonardo Sequeira (at Central Córdoba until 31 December 2026)
—	FW	PAR	Marcelo Pérez (at Juventud until 31 December 2026)

=== Individual records ===
==== Most appearances ====
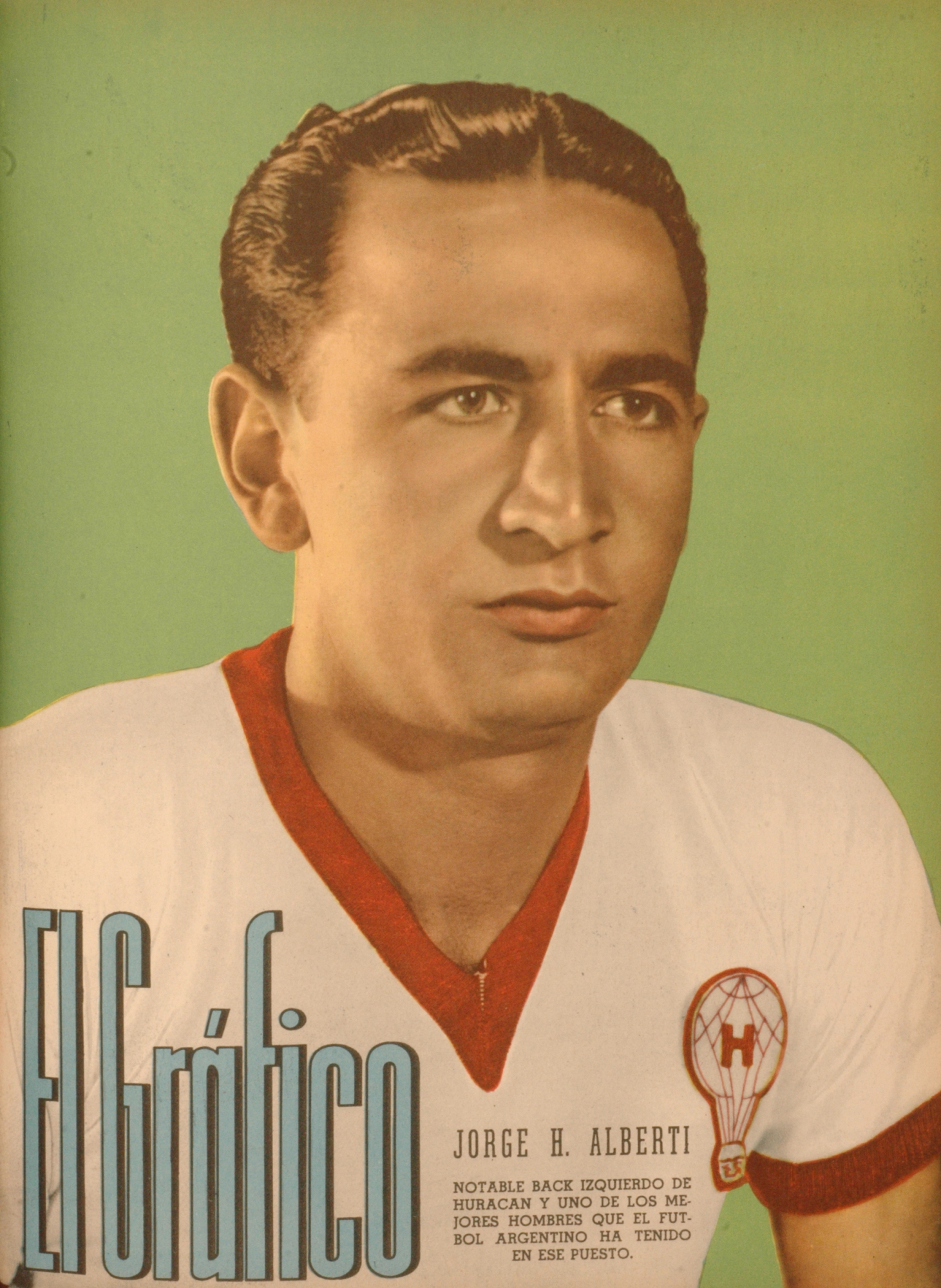
Jorge Alberti has the record of matches played

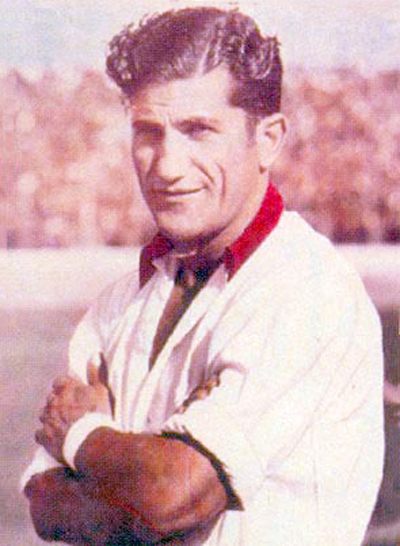
Herminio Masantonio, all-time top scorer for Huracán

No.	Player	Pos.	Tenure	Match.
1	(Argentina) Jorge Alberti	DF	1930–47	424
2	(Argentina) Herminio Masantonio	FW	1931–43	366
3	(Argentina) Miguel Brindisi	MF	1967–76, 1979–80	362
4	(Argentina) Carlos Babington	MF	1967–74, 1978–82	312
5	(Argentina) Jorge Carrascosa	DF	1973–79	298

==== Top scorers ====
No.	Player	Pos.	Tenure	Goals
1	(Argentina) Herminio Masantonio	FW	1931–43	265
2	(Argentina) Miguel Brindisi	MF	1967–76, 1979–80	172
3	(Argentina) Emilio Baldonedo	FW	1935–44	167
4	(Argentina) Carlos Babington	MF	1967–74, 1978–82	130
5	(Argentina) Ángel Chiesa	LW	1920–31	110

=== Current coaching staff ===
Position	Staff
Head coach	(Argentina) Diego Martínez
Assistant coach	(Argentina) Jorge Ribolzi
Assistant coach	(Argentina) Adrián González
Assistant coach	(Argentina) Gustavo Rodríguez
Goalkeeping coach	(Argentina) Pablo Campodónico
Fitness coach	(Argentina) Juan Manuel Conte
Doctor	(Argentina) Fernando Locaso
Doctor	(Argentina) Pedro Di Spagna
Kinesiologist	(Argentina) Daniel Arias
Kinesiologist	(Argentina) Pedro Alcibar
Kinesiologist	(Argentina) Sergio Meza
Masseur	(Argentina) Sebastián Tartarone
Nutritionist	(Argentina) Macarena Krasser
Performance analyst	(Argentina) Alejandro Foglia
Video analyst	(Argentina) Mariano Costas
Kit man	(Argentina) Jorge Bispe
Kit man	(Argentina) Javier Kop
Security	(Argentina) Sebastián Perazzo
Professional football manager	(Argentina) Fernando Salces

Last updated: 2 May 2025
Source: Cuerpo Técnico

== Managers ==
- (Argentina) José Durand Laguna (1931)
- (Argentina) Guillermo Stábile (1940–49)
- (Italy) Luis Monti (1947–48)
- (Argentina) Adolfo Pedernera (1954), (1955–56)
- (Argentina) José Manuel Moreno (1960)
- (Argentina) Ernesto Cucchiaroni (1964)
- (Argentina) José Manuel Moreno (1966)
- (Argentina) Renato Cesarini (1968)
- (Argentina) Adolfo Pedernera (1970)
- (Argentina) Alberto Rendo (1970)
- (Argentina) Osvaldo Zubeldía (1971)
- (Argentina) César Luis Menotti (1972–73)
- (Brazil) Delém (1975)
- (Argentina) Alberto Rendo (1978)
- (Argentina) Alfio Basile (1982)
- (Argentina) José Varacka (1982)
- (Argentina) Osvaldo Sosa (1983)
- (Argentina) José Varacka (1985)
- (Argentina) Héctor Yazalde (1986)
- (Argentina) Ángel Cappa (1988)
- (Argentina) Alberto Fanesi (1991–92)
- (Argentina) Enzo Trossero (1992–94)
- (Argentina) Héctor Cúper (1993–95)
- (Argentina) Claudio Morresi (1995)
- (Argentina) Omar Larrosa (1998)
- (Argentina) Osvaldo Piazza (2001)
- (Argentina) Claudio Morresi (2001)
- (Argentina) Miguel Ángel Brindisi (2001–03)
- (Argentina) Fernando Quiroz (2003)
- (Argentina) Omar Labruna (2005)
- (Argentina) Fernando Quiroz (2005)
- (Argentina) Osvaldo Sosa (2006)
- (Argentina) Osvaldo Ardiles (2007)
- (Argentina) Claudio Ubeda (2008)
- (Argentina) Ángel Cappa (2008–09)
- (Argentina) Héctor Rivoira (2009–10)
- (Argentina) Miguel Ángel Brindisi (2010–11)
- (Argentina) Roberto Pompei (2011)
- (Argentina) Diego Cocca (2011–12)
- (Argentina) Héctor Rivoira (2012)
- (Argentina) Juan Manuel Llop (2012–13)
- (Argentina) Antonio Mohamed (2013)
- (Argentina) Néstor Apuzzo (2014–15)
- (Argentina) Eduardo Domínguez (2015–16)
- (Argentina) Ricardo Caruso Lombardi (2016)
- (Argentina) Juan Manuel Azconzábal (2016–17)
- (Argentina) Néstor Apuzzo (2017) c
- (Argentina) Gustavo Alfaro (2017–18)
- (Argentina) Antonio Mohamed (2019)
- (Argentina) Juan Pablo Vojvoda (2019)
- (Argentina) Néstor Apuzzo (2019) c
- (Argentina) Israel Damonte (2020–2021)
- (Argentina) Frank Darío Kudelka (2021–2022)
- (Argentina) Diego Dabove (2022–2023)
- (Argentina) Sebastián Battaglia (2023)
- (Argentina) Diego Martínez (2023)
- (Argentina) Facundo Sava (2024)
- (Argentina) Walter Coyette (2024) c
- (Argentina) Frank Darío Kudelka (2024–)

== Honours ==
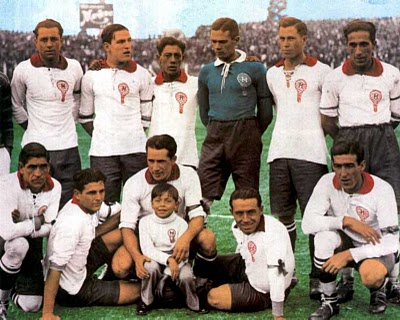
Huracán in 1928, when the team won its fourth Primera División title

=== Senior titles ===
Keys

- Record
- ^{(s)} Shared record

Type	Competition	Titles	Winning years
National (League)	Primera División	5	1921, 1922, 1925, 1928, 1973 Metropolitano
National (Cups)	Copa Estímulo	1^{(s)}	1920
National (Cups)	Copa Dr. Carlos Ibarguren	2	1922, 1925
National (Cups)	Copa Adrián C. Escobar	2	1942, 1943
National (Cups)	Copa de Competencia Británica George VI	1^{(s)}	1944
National (Cups)	Copa Argentina	1	2013–14
National (Cups)	Supercopa Argentina	1	2014

=== Other titles ===
Titles won in lower divisions:

- Primera B Nacional (2): 1989–90, 1999–00
- División Intermedia (1): 1913
