= Argentina national football team results (unofficial matches) =

National football team results (unofficial matches)

This is a list of results for all the unofficial matches played by the Argentina national football team.

== Results ==
Key Win Draw Loss

=== 1898–1949 ===
29 June 1898 Friendly	Albion (Uruguay)	?-?	Argentina	Montevideo, Uruguay
		Report

16 May 1901 Friendly	Albion (Uruguay)	2–3	Argentina	Montevideo, Uruguay
	Céspedes; Poole		Leslie; Dickinson; Anderson

1902 Friendly	Albion (Uruguay)	1–0	Argentina	Montevideo, Uruguay
	Goal

9 Jul 1904 Friendly	Argentina	0–8	(England) Southampton	Buenos Aires
			Bluff; Fraser; Hedley; Whiting	Stadium: Sociedad Sportiva Argentina

29 Jun 1905 Friendly	Argentina	0–5	(England) Nottingham Forest	Buenos Aires
			Spouncer; Lessons; Niblo; Holmes	Stadium: Sociedad Sportiva Argentina; Referee: M. A. Jordán

2 Jul 1908 Friendly	Foreigners of São Paulo (São Paulo (state))	2–2	Argentina	São Paulo, Brazil
	Charles Miller		Jorge Brown; Eliseo Brown	Stadium: Velódromo Paulistano; Referee: Mariano Reyna (ARG)

5 Jul 1908 Friendly	São Paulo (São Paulo (state))	0–6	Argentina	São Paulo, Brazil
			M. Susán; Ernesto Brown; Eliseo Brown; Alfredo Brown	Stadium: Velódromo Paulistano; Referee: Hermann Friese (BRA)

7 Jul 1908 Friendly	São Paulo (São Paulo (state))	0–4	Argentina	São Paulo, Brazil
			F. Dickinson; M. Susán; Alfredo Brown; Ernesto Brown	Stadium: Velódromo Paulistano; Referee: Mariano Reyna (ARG)

9 Jul 1908 Friendly	Rio de Janeiro	2–3	Argentina	Rio de Janeiro, Brazil
	Etchegaray 7' (o.g.); Raphael Sampaio 34'		F. Dickinson 17'; Burgos 55'; Etchegaray 79'	Stadium: Estádio das Laranjeiras; Referee: Mariano Reyna (ARG)

11 Jul 1908 Friendly	English of Rio	1–7	Argentina	Rio de Janeiro, Brazil
	H. Monk		Robinson; Eliseo Brown; Burgos; Ernesto Brown; M. Susán	Stadium: Estádio das Laranjeiras; Referee: Mariano Reyna (ARG)

12 Jul 1908 Friendly	Rio de Janeiro	0–3	Argentina	Rio de Janeiro
			Ernesto Brown 1', 55', 70'	Stadium: Estádio das Laranjeiras; Referee: Mariano Reyna (ARG)

14 Jul 1908 Friendly	CA Internacional (Brazil)	1–6	Argentina	Santos, Brazil
	Colston		Eliseo Brown; M.Susán; Ernesto Brown	Stadium: Avenida Ana Costa; Referee: Mariano Reyna (ARG)

13 Jul 1909 Friendly	Argentina	0–1	(England) Tottenham Hotspur	Buenos Aires
			P. McConnor	Stadium: Sociedad Sportiva Argentina; Referee: H. Torre (ARG)

28 May 1910 Friendly	Argentina	5–1	(Argentina) Resident British XI	Buenos Aires
	M. González 30', 75'; Eliseo Brown 37', 80'; Watson Hutton 73'		H. Whaley 40'	Stadium: Belgrano Athletic Club; Referee: H. Alfano (ARG)

13 Sep 1910 Friendly	British of Chile XI	1–5	Argentina	Viña del Mar, Chile
	Goal		Goodfellow; M. González; E. Fernández

18 Sep 1910 Friendly	Liga de Valparaíso (Chile)	0–3	Argentina	Viña del Mar, Chile
			J. H. Lawrie; E. Fernández; M. González

22 Sep 1910 Friendly	Liga de Valparaíso (Chile)	0–5	Argentina	Valparaíso, Chile
			J. Gil; M. González; J. Sheridan; E. Fernández

25 Sep 1910 Friendly	Liga de Valparaíso (Chile)	2–6	Argentina	Valparaíso, Chile
	Goal		Goal

9 Oct 1910 Friendly	Montevideo Wanderers (Uruguay)	2–1	Argentina	Montevideo, Uruguay
	A. Leal 76' (o.g.); Bertone 86'		A. Leal 23'	Stadium: Estadio Belvedere

20 Nov 1910 Friendly	Rosario XI	1–3	Argentina	Rosario
	Goal		Goal

30 Jun 1912 Friendly	CURCC / Nacional (Uruguay)	0–2	Argentina	Montevideo, Uruguay
			Goal

9 Jul 1912 Friendly	Argentina	0–1	(England) Swindon Town	Buenos Aires
			Jefferson 12'	Stadium: Estadio G.E.B.A.

4 Sep 1912 Friendly	Paulistano (Brazil)	4–3	Argentina	São Paulo, Brazil
	Mariano; Décio		Hayes	Stadium: Velódromo Paulistano; Referee: Mariano Reyna (ARG)

5 Sep 1912 Friendly	Americano (Brazil)	0–3	Argentina	São Paulo, Brazil
			Goal	Stadium: Velódromo Paulistano

7 Sep 1912 Friendly	Foreigners of São Paulo (São Paulo (state))	3–6	Argentina	São Paulo, Brazil
	Colston; Banks; Manne		M. Susán; Hayes; Viale; Ernesto Brown	Stadium: Velódromo Paulistano; Referee: Mariano Reyna (ARG)

8 Sep 1912 Friendly	São Paulo (São Paulo (state))	3–6	Argentina	São Paulo, Brazil
	Friedenreich 18'; Irineu 28'; Rubens Salles 30'		M. Susán 15', 25'; Ernesto Brown 32', 50', 81'; Hayes 60'	Stadium: Velódromo Paulistano; Referee: Mariano Reyna (ARG)

12 Sep 1912 Friendly	Rio de Janeiro	0–4	Argentina	Rio de Janeiro, Brazil
			Ernesto Brown 2'; Ohaco 60'; Hayes 72', 85'	Stadium: Estádio das Laranjeiras; Referee: H. Alfano (ARG)

14 Sep 1914 Friendly	English of Rio	1–9	Argentina	Rio de Janeiro, Brazil
	Goal		Goal	Stadium: Estádio das Laranjeiras

16 Sep 1912 Friendly	Rio de Janeiro	0–5	Argentina	Rio de Janeiro, Brazil
			Hayes 20', 37', 65', 80'; M. Susán 20'	Stadium: Estádio das Laranjeiras; Referee: Víctor Etchegaray (ARG)

10 Aug 1913 Friendly	Argentina	0–2	(São Paulo (state)) São Paulo	Avellaneda
			Décio 33'; Juvenal 35'	Stadium: Estadio Racing Club; Referee: A. Hutchinson (USA)

17 Aug 1913 Friendly	Argentina	2–0	(São Paulo (state)) São Paulo	Buenos Aires
	Viale 71'; M. Susán 84'			Stadium: Estadio G.E.B.A. Referee: O. Picudo (BRA)

16 Sep 1913 Friendly	Liga de Antofagasta (Chile)	0–3	Argentina	Viña del Mar, Chile
			Chiappe; Bownas; Ohaco

19 Sep 1913 Friendly	Liga de Santiago (Chile)	2–4	Argentina	Santiago, Chile
	Goal		Goal

21 Sep 1913 Friendly	Liga de Valparaíso (Chile)	1–2	Argentina	Valparaíso, Chile
	Goal		Goal

11 Jul 1914 Friendly	Argentina	0–0	(England) Exeter City	Buenos Aires
				Stadium: Estadio Ferro Carril Oeste

30 Aug 1914 Friendly	Argentina	2–1	(Italy) Torino	Buenos Aires
	Marcovecchio		Mosso	Stadium: Estadio Racing Club

24 May 1919 Friendly	Bangu (Brazil)	1–1	Argentina	Rio de Janeiro, Brazil
	Pastor		Goal	Stadium: Rua Ferrer

5 Jun 1919 Friendly	São Paulo (São Paulo (state))	2–1	Argentina	São Paulo, Brazil
	Ministro 36'; Heitor 44'		Brichetto 59'	Stadium: Chácara da Floresta; Referee: Juan Barbera (ARG)

18 Jul 1920 Friendly	Argentina	4–2	(Argentina) Liga Cordobesa	Buenos Aires
	Vivaldo 38', 40'; Clarke 44'; Faivre 65'		Salvatelli 49'; Pieri 71'	Stadium: Estadio Ministro Brin y Senguel

6 Oct 1920 Friendly	Argentina	3–1	Brazil	Buenos Aires
	Etcheverria; Lucarelli		Castelhano	Stadium: Estadio Sportivo Barracas; Referee: F. Diez (ARG)

4 Apr 1921 Friendly	Olimpia (Paraguay)	0–2	Argentina	Asunción, Paraguay
			Goal

10 Apr 1921 Friendly	Guaraní (Paraguay)	2–3	Argentina	Asunción, Paraguay
	Goal		Goal

15 Apr 1921 Friendly	Libertad (Paraguay)	2–2	Argentina	Asunción, Paraguay
	Goal		Goal

16 Jul 1922 Friendly	Argentina	4–0	Basque Country	Buenos Aires
	Gaslini 55', 81'; Chiessa 67'; Rofrano 83'			Stadium: Estadio Sportivo Barracas; Referee: P. MacCarthy (IRE)

6 Aug 1922 Friendly	Argentina	1–1	(Czechoslovakia) Teplitzer FK	Buenos Aires
	Gaslini 8'		Schroder 38'	Stadium: Estadio Sportivo Barracas

13 Aug 1922 Friendly	Argentina	1–1	(Czechoslovakia) Teplitzer FK	Buenos Aires
	Libonatti 24'		Banas 66'	Stadium: Estadio Sportivo Barracas

20 Aug 1922 Friendly	Argentina	3–3	(Czechoslovakia) Teplitzer FK	Buenos Aires
	De Césari 21'; Gaslini 43', 46'		Sedlacek 5', 63', 77'	Stadium: Estadio Sportivo Barracas

3 Sep 1922 Friendly	Argentina	3–6	(Czechoslovakia) Teplitzer FK	Buenos Aires
	Izaguirre 3'; Vivaldo 9'; Tarasconi 50'		Sedlacek 12', 39'; Schroder 20', 26', 56'; Koseluk 87'	Stadium: Estadio Sportivo Barracas

7 Sep 1922 Friendly	Argentina	3–1	(Czechoslovakia) Teplitzer FK	Buenos Aires
	Onzari 53'; Tarasconi 64'; Rosado 66'		Sedlacek 33'	Stadium: Estadio Sportivo Barracas

28 Oct 1922 Friendly	Paulistano (Brazil)	4–1	Argentina	São Paulo, Brazil
	Zecchi; Clodoaldo; Mário de Andrade		Gaslini 35'	Stadium: Estádio Jardim América; Referee: Servando Pérez (ARG)

10 Nov 1922 Friendly	Peñarol (Uruguay)	2–1	Argentina	Montevideo, Uruguay
	Goal		Goal

24 Jun 1923 Friendly	Argentina	1–1	(Scotland) Third Lanark	Buenos Aires
	Seoane 55'		Reid 89'	Stadium: Estadio Alvear y Tagle; Referee: Lorenzo Martinéz (ARG)

25 Aug 1923 Friendly	Nacional (Uruguay)	0–1	Argentina	Montevideo, Uruguay
			A. López 89'	Stadium: Parque Central

9 Sep 1923 Prince Humberto Cup	Argentina	1–1	(Italy) Genoa	Buenos Aires
	Goal		Goal

12 Oct 1923 Friendly	Argentina	0–2	Paraguay	Buenos Aires
			I. Lopéz 43'; E. Díaz 88'	Stadium: Estadio Sportivo Barracas

17 May 1924 Friendly	Olimpia (Paraguay)	3–2	Argentina	Asunción, Paraguay
	Goal		Goal

25 May 1924 Friendly	Paraná XI	0–3	Argentina	Paraná
			Goal

22 Jun 1924 Friendly	Argentina	0–1	(England) Plymouth Argyle	Buenos Aires
			Cherret 19'	Stadium: Estadio Sportivo Barracas; Referee: F. Reeves (ENG)

29 Jun 1924 Friendly	Argentina	3–0	(England) Plymouth Argyle	Buenos Aires
	Sosa 17', 27'; Seoane 61'			Stadium: Estadio Sportivo Barracas; Referee: F. Reeves (ENG)

13 Jul 1924 Friendly	Argentina	0–1	(England) Plymouth Argyle	Buenos Aires
			Rowe 52'	Stadium: Estadio Ministro Brin y Senguel

20 Jul 1924 Friendly	Argentina	1–0	(England) Plymouth Argyle	Buenos Aires
	Seoane 10'			Stadium: Estadio Sportivo Barracas

26 Nov 1924 Friendly	Argentina	1–1	(Argentina) Liga Santafesina	Santa Fe
	Echagüe 23' (o.g.)		Francia 79' (pen.)	Stadium: Gimnasia y Esgrima de Santa Fe; Referee: S. Tochi

8 Dec 1924 Friendly	Argentina	1–1	(Argentina) Asociación Amateurs de Football	Buenos Aires
	Seoane 27'		Ochoa 5'	Stadium: Estadio G.E.B.A. Referee: G. Guassoni / L. Celleri

2 Aug 1925 Friendly	Boca Juniors (Argentina)	1–1	Argentina	Buenos Aires
	Pertini 72'		Varela 44'	Stadium: Estadio Brandsen y Del Crucero

17 Jan 1926 Friendly	Argentina	6–0	(Argentina) Asociación Amateurs de Football	Buenos Aires
	Cerrotti 11'; Stábile 18', 48', 50'; Dighero 47'; Seoane 59'			Stadium: Estadio Alvear y Tagle; Referee: G. Guassoni / L. Celleri

9 Jul 1926 Friendly	Argentina	2–2	(Spain) Espanyol	Buenos Aires
	Perducca 39'; Cherro 51'		Tesoriere 67' (o.g.); Oramas 72'	Stadium: Estadio Sportivo Barracas; Referee: Jerónimo Repossi (ARG)

28 Aug 1926 Friendly	Argentina	5–1	(Argentina) Argentinos Juniors	Buenos Aires
	Goal		Goal

1 Oct 1926 Friendly	Argentina	3–1	(Argentina) Chacarita Juniors	Buenos Aires
	De Miguel 10'; Tarasconi 51'; Sosa 56'		Gaslini 30'	Stadium: Estadio Lacroze y Thomas

7 Nov 1926 Friendly	Argentina	5–1	(Peru) Association FC	Buenos Aires
	Monti 2'; Vitali 13'; Seoane 23', 75'; R. Bacchi 82'		Villavicencio 17'	Stadium: Estadio Sportivo Barracas

11 Nov 1926 Friendly	Argentina	4–1	(Peru) Association FC	Buenos Aires
	Irurieta 4', 30', 53'; L. Acosta 65'		Aranda 42'	Stadium: Estadio Sportivo Barracas

7 Jul 1927 Friendly	Argentina	0–0	(Spain) Real Madrid	Buenos Aires
				Stadium: Estadio Sportivo Barracas; Referee: Servando Pérez (ARG)

10 Jul 1927 Friendly	Argentina	3–2	(Spain) Real Madrid	Buenos Aires
	Carricaberry 18', 90'; Calandra 56'		Triana 15', 66'	Stadium: Estadio Sportivo Barracas; Referee: José Calli (ARG)

4 Apr 1928 Friendly	Atlético de Madrid (Spain)	0–2	Argentina	Madrid, Spain
			Perinetti 58'; Médici 69'	Stadium: Estadio Metropolitano de Madrid; Referee: Díaz

22 Apr 1928 Friendly	Barcelona (Spain)	4–1	Argentina	Barcelona, Spain
	Arocha 31', 38', 40', 52'		Orsi 10'	Stadium: Camp de Les Corts; Referee: Martínez

2 Jun 1928 Friendly	Argentina	0–3	(Scotland) Motherwell	Buenos Aires
			MacFadyen 4', 71'; Recantini 77' (o.g.)	Stadium: Estadio Brandsen y Del Crucero; Referee: Luís Celleri

8 Jul 1928 Friendly	Argentina	0–1	(Spain) Celta de Vigo	Buenos Aires
			Gestoso 41'	Stadium: Estadio Brandsen y Del Crucero

9 Jul 1928 Friendly	Argentina	8–0	(Spain) Celta de Vigo	Buenos Aires
	Sandoval 27', 56'; Penella 32', 48', 71'; Marassi 52', 57', 77'			Stadium: Estadio Alvear y Tagle

14 Jul 1928 Friendly	Argentina	3–0	(Spain) Celta de Vigo	Avellaneda
	Evaristo 60'; Cherro 75' (pen.); Baragnano 86'			Stadium: Estadio Independiente; Referee: C. Carigliano

4 Aug 1928 Friendly	Argentina	3–1	(Spain) Barcelona	Buenos Aires
	Orsi 43', 75'; Tarasconi 86'		Samitier 25'	Stadium: Estadio Sportivo Barracas; Referee: Agustín Vilalta (ESP)

5 Aug 1928 Friendly	Argentina	0–0	(Spain) Barcelona	Buenos Aires
				Stadium: Estadio Alvear y Tagle; Referee: L. Martínez (ARG)

15 Aug 1928 Friendly	Argentina	1–0	(Spain) Barcelona	Buenos Aires
	Perducca 41'			Stadium: Estadio Alvear y Tagle; Referee: Jerónimo Repossi (ARG)

15 Nov 1928 Friendly	Boca Juniors (Argentina)	1–1	Argentina	Buenos Aires
	Cherro 73'		Seoane 79'	Stadium: Estadio Brandsen y Del Crucero

26 Feb 1929 Friendly	Argentina	6–1	(Brazil) America-RJ	Avellaneda
	Onzari 8'; Cherro 14', 33'; Peucelle 40'; Ferreira 72', 81'		Siriri 66'	Stadium: Estadio Independiente; Referee: S. Gómez (ARG)

16 Mar 1929 Friendly	Argentina	2–0	(Brazil) America-RJ	Buenos Aires
	Onzari 30'; Peucelle 63'			Stadium: Estadio Gasómetro; Referee: S. Gómez (ARG)

30 May 1929 Friendly	Argentina	0–1	(England) Chelsea	Buenos Aires
			Wilson 5'	Stadium: Estadio Alvear y Tagle; Referee: José Bartolomé Macías (ARG)

3 Aug 1929 Friendly	Argentina	1–1	(Italy) Torino	Buenos Aires
	Maglio 25'		R. Wolk 17'	Stadium: Estadio Alvear y Tagle; Referee: L. Martínez (ARG)

4 Aug 1929 Friendly	Argentina	4–1	(Italy) Torino	Buenos Aires
	Tarasconi 16', 35', 82'; Scopelli 75'		R. Wolk 7'	Stadium: Estadio Brandsen y Del Crucero; Referee: C. Nay Foino (ARG)

10 Aug 1929 Friendly	Argentina	2–0	(Hungary) Ferencváros	Buenos Aires
	Maglio 80', 81'			Stadium: Estadio Alvear y Tagle; Referee: R. L. Todd (ENG)

15 Aug 1929 Friendly	Argentina	3–1	(Italy) Bologna	Buenos Aires
	Evaristo 13', 25'; Cherro 62'		Magnozzi 87'	Stadium: Estadio Jorge Newbery; Referee: J. Cúneo (ARG)

18 Aug 1929 Friendly	Argentina	0–0	(Italy) Bologna	Avellaneda
				Stadium: Estadio Independiente; Referee: J. Galli (ARG)

13 Jul 1930 Friendly	Argentina	3–1	(United States) New York Hakoah	Buenos Aires
	Locaso 57', 80'; Viola 79'		Scheneider 60'	Stadium: Estadio Brandsen y Del Crucero

23 Apr 1931 Friendly	Olimpia (Paraguay)	1–5	Argentina	Asunción, Paraguay
	Etcheverry		Devincenzi; Castro; Peucelle	Referee: M. Barba

25 May 1932 Friendly	Atlético Tucumán (Argentina)	0–1	Argentina	San Miguel de Tucumán
			F. Pérez	Stadium: Estadio José Fierro

15 Apr 1933 Friendly	Argentina	2–1	(Brazil) Flamengo	Buenos Aires
	Luppo		Nelson	Stadium: Estadio Sportivo Barracas; Referee: J. Galli (ARG)

18 Jun 1933 Friendly	Colo-Colo (Chile)	2–3	Argentina	Santiago, Chile
	Goal		Pedevilla; F. Pérez

22 Jun 1933 Friendly	Green Cross (Chile)	5–6	Argentina	Santiago, Chile
	Goal		F. Vargas; Pedevilla; Mattas

25 Jun 1933 Friendly	Audax Italiano (Chile)	1–3	Argentina	Santiago, Chile
	Goal		Lorenzo; Mattas

29 Jun 1933 Friendly	Unión Española (Chile)	0–1	Argentina	Santiago, Chile
			A. Etcheverry

2 Jul 1933 Friendly	Magallanes (Chile)	4–6	Argentina	Santiago, Chile
	Goal		F. Vargas; Lorenzo; F. Pérez; Mattas; Arnaiz

9 Jul 1933 Friendly	Colo-Colo (Chile)	2–3	Argentina	Santiago, Chile
	Goal		F. Vargas; Mattas

16 Jul 1933 Friendly	Unión Española (Chile)	1–3	Argentina	Santiago, Chile
	Goal		Lorenzo

1 Nov 1933 Friendly	Argentina	3–0	(Argentina) Liga Rosarina	Buenos Aires
	O. Correa 62'; Lorenzo 82'; A. Etcheverry 85'			Stadium: Estadio Sportivo Barracas

9 Mar 1934 Friendly	Newell's Old Boys (Argentina)	2–2	Argentina	Rosario
	Giménez 1', 7'		F. Pérez 22'; F. Vargas 65'	Stadium: El Coloso del Parque; Referee: J. Rota (ARG)

11 Mar 1934 Friendly	Unión de Santa Fe (Argentina)	3–5	Argentina	Santa Fe
	Goal		Goal	Stadium: Estadio 15 de Abril

18 Mar 1934 Friendly	Talleres de Córdoba (Argentina)	0–0	Argentina	Córdoba

20 Mar 1934 Friendly	Argentino Peñarol (Argentina)	3–3	Argentina	Córdoba

30 Mar 1934 Friendly	Argentina	4–1	(Argentina) Nacional de Rosario	Buenos Aires
	Lorenzo 16'; Wilde 40'; Galateo 62', 79'		Pereyra 67'	Stadium: Estadio Alvear y Tagle

14 Jun 1934 Friendly	Italy B	0–2	Argentina	Milan, Italy
			Devincenzi 64', 89' (pen.)	Stadium: San Siro; Referee: René Mercet (SWI)

20 Jun 1935 Friendly	Argentina	2–2	Rosario XI	Avellaneda
	Ferreyra; E. Pereyra		Fabrini	Stadium: Estadio Independiente; Referee: J. Galli (ARG)

7 Jul 1935 Friendly	Argentina	2–2	(Spain) Atlético de Madrid / Espanyol	Avellaneda
	Cherro 10'; Zozaya 43'		Elícegui 6', 82'	Stadium: Estadio Independiente; Referee: J. Galli (ARG)

9 Jul 1935 Friendly	Argentina	1–1	(Spain) Atlético de Madrid / Espanyol	Avellaneda
	E. Pereyra 17'		Elícegui 4'	Stadium: Estadio Independiente; Referee: E. Forte (ARG)

14 Jul 1935 Friendly	Argentina	1–0	(Spain) Atlético de Madrid / Espanyol	Buenos Aires
	Masantonio 67'			Stadium: Estadio Gasómetro; Referee: José Bartolomé Macías (ARG)

9 Jul 1936 Friendly	Rosario XI	6–1	Argentina	Rosario
	L. Amaya; V. de la Mata; E. Gómez		Zozaya	Stadium: Estadio Gigante de Arroyito; Referee: J. Podestá

2 Aug 1936 Friendly	Argentina	4–1	Rosario XI	Buenos Aires
	Sastre; Zozaya; Moreno; E. García		V. de la Mata	Stadium: Estadio Gasómetro; Referee: E. Forte (ARG)

18 Oct 1936 Friendly	Argentina	3–0	Rosario XI	Buenos Aires
	Varallo; Naón; Emeal			Stadium: Estadio Gasómetro; Referee: J. Galli (ARG)

25 May 1937 Friendly	Argentina	5–3	Rosario XI	Avellaneda
	Alarcón; Varallo; Pedernera		Ballesteros; Ligterman; Oviedo	Stadium: Estadio Independiente; Referee: J. J. Alvarez (ARG)

29 Jun 1937 Friendly	Rosario XI	1–2	Argentina	Rosario
	J. C. Fernández		Alarcón; Zozaya	Stadium: Estadio Gigante de Arroyito; Referee: E. Marconi

25 May 1938 Friendly	Rosario XI	2–2	Argentina	Rosario
	E. Gómez		Masantonio; Alarcón	Stadium: El Coloso del Parque; Referee: J. Podestá

28 Jun 1938 Friendly	Argentina	3–2	Rosario XI	Buenos Aires
	Masantonio; Baldonedo		E. Maigán; E. Gómez	Stadium: Estadio Gasómetro; Referee: I. Caswell

14 Dec 1938 Friendly	Argentina	1–1	(Argentina) Boca Juniors	Buenos Aires
	Masantonio 85'		Tossoni 63'	Stadium: Estadio Gasómetro; Referee: M. Iglesias

2 Jan 1939 Friendly	Estudiantes de La Plata (Argentina)	1–4	Argentina	La Plata
	Nuccitelli 82'		Cosso 7', 25', 28'; Moreno 63'	Stadium: Estadio Jorge Luis Hirschi; Referee: J. A. Doma

15 Aug 1940 Friendly	Rosario XI	5–1	Argentina	Rosario
	E. Gómez; L. Fiori		Cassán	Stadium: El Coloso del Parque; Referee: A. Podestá

30 Dec 1940 Friendly	Argentina	1–3	Rosario XI	Buenos Aires
	Marvezzi		L. Fiori; A. Monestés	Stadium: Estadio Gasómetro; Referee: J. J. Alvarez (ARG)

9 Jul 1941 Friendly	Argentina	3–2	Foreigners of Argentina	Buenos Aires
	Alcalde 2', 75'; Moreno 78'		Lángara 11', 53'	Stadium: Monumental de Nuñez; Referee: José Bartolomé Macías (ARG)

6 Jan 1943 Friendly	Argentina	1–0	Uruguay	Buenos Aires
	Martino 3'			Stadium: Estadio Gasómetro; Referee: Aníbal Tejada (URU)

9 Jan 1943 Friendly	Uruguay	6–2	Argentina	Montevideo, Uruguay
	A. García 3', 14'; Varela 11'; Zapirain 25', 80'; Porta 51'		Alberti 7'; S. González 87' (o.g.)	Stadium: Estadio Centenario; Referee: José Bartolomé Macías (ARG)

5 Jan 1944 Friendly	Uruguay	1–3	Argentina	Montevideo, Uruguay
	Goal		Goal	Stadium: Estadio Centenario

8 Jan 1944 Friendly	Argentina	3–3	Uruguay	Buenos Aires
	Goal		Goal	Stadium: Estadio Gasómetro

29 Jan 1944 Friendly	Uruguay	2–1	Argentina	Montevideo, Uruguay
	Medina; Zapirain		Labruna	Stadium: Estadio Centenario

29 Jan 1944 Friendly	Argentina	6–2	Uruguay	Buenos Aires
	Martino; Salvini; Pontoni; Loustau		Chirimini; Porta	Stadium: Estadio Gasómetro

29 Dec 1945 Friendly	Uruguay	1–1	Argentina	Montevideo, Uruguay
	Goal		Goal	Stadium: Estadio Centenario

5 Jan 1946 Friendly	Argentina	5–2	(Argentina) Argentinos Juniors	Buenos Aires
	Pontoni 21', 43'; Labruna 54'; Farro 57'; Sued 74'		O. Ayastuy 63'; M. Fernández 72'	Stadium: Estadio Gasómetro; Referee: J. Cángaro (ARG)

9 Jan 1946 Friendly	Argentina	4–1	(Argentina) Defensores de Belgrano	Buenos Aires
	Pontoni 1', 22'; Labruna 53', 75'		R. González 82'	Stadium: Monumental de Nuñez; Referee: R. Riestra (ARG)

2 Mar 1947 Friendly	Argentina	2–1	Uruguay	Buenos Aires
	Goal		Goal	Stadium: Monumental de Ñunez

9 Mar 1947 Friendly	Uruguay	4–4	Argentina	Montevideo, Uruguay
	Goal		Goal	Stadium: Estadio Centenario

18 May 1948 Friendly	Uruguay	0–1	Argentina	Montevideo, Uruguay
			Goal	Stadium: Estadio Centenario

25 May 1948 Friendly	Argentina	0–2	Uruguay	Buenos Aires
			Goal	Stadium: Estadio Jorge Newbery

=== 1950–1999 ===
24 Mar 1953 Friendly	Liga Mendocina (Argentina)	0–5	Argentina	Mendoza
			Lacasia 21'; Sánchez 25', 29' (pen.), 32'; Micheli 27'	Stadium: Víctor Legrotaglie; Referee: E. Wilbraham (ENG)

21 Nov 1954 Friendly	Argentina	7–2	(Argentina) Combinado del Interior	Buenos Aires
	O. Cruz 7'; Cecconato 10'; Grillo 22', 28'; Micheli 32'; Labruna 60'; Prado 89'		Fuenzalida 14'; Salinas 68'	Stadium: Estadio Gasómetro; Referee: L. Burfield (ENG)

20 Sep 1956 Friendly	Grêmio (Brazil)	0–0	Argentina	Porto Alegre, Brazil
				Stadium: Estádio Olímpico Monumental; Referee: B. Cross (ENG)

5 Dec 1956 Copa Raúl Colombo	Rio de Janeiro	1–2	Argentina	Rio de Janeiro, Brazil
	Índio 15'		Sanfilippo 69'; Garabal 70'	Stadium: Estádio do Maracanã; Referee: Estebán Marino (URU)

21 Feb 1957 Friendly	Argentina	12–1	(Argentina) Atlanta	Buenos Aires
	Sívori 6', 68'; Angelillo 8', 58'; Garabal 9', 51', 70'; Maschio 15', 61'; Corbatta 25', 31', 73'		Clariá 76'	Stadium: Monumental de Nuñez; Referee: Miguel Ángel Comesaña (ARG)

12 Jun 1957 Friendly	São Paulo (São Paulo (state))	3–1	Argentina	São Paulo, Brazil
	Maurinho 2'; Zezinho 14'; Bauer 80'		Héctor Antonio 58'	Stadium: Estádio do Pacaembu; Referee: Bertley Cross (ENG)

7 Nov 1957 Friendly	Argentina	2–2	Rio de Janeiro	Buenos Aires
	Corbatta 8'; Zárate 31'		Ubaldo 50'; Zizinho 63'	Stadium: Estadio Tomás Adolfo Ducó; Referee: Ronald Lynch (ING)

16 Mar 1958 Friendly	Liga Mendocina (Argentina)	1–4	Argentina	Mendoza
	Medina 86'		Corbatta 8', 29', 83'; L. Pereyra 73'	Stadium: Víctor Legrotaglie; Referee: Erwin Hiegger (NIR)

19 Mar 1958 Friendly	Liga Sanjuanina (Argentina)	0–4	Argentina	San Juan
			Juárez 17', 34', 76'; Callá 81'	Stadium: Estadio Ingeniero Hilario Sánchez; Referee: Erwin Hiegger (NIR)

12 Apr 1958 Friendly	Liga Paranaense (Argentina)	2–10	Argentina	Paraná
	González 40' (pen.); Hizi 55'		Juárez 7', 21'; Sanfilippo 9', 61', 80'; Rossi 14'; O. Cruz 35'; Corbatta 61', 68', 81'	Referee: Erwin Hiegger (NIR)

4 May 1958 Friendly	Colo-Colo (Chile)	2–2	Argentina	Santiago, Chile
	Hormazábal 53', 67'		Prado 20', 27'	Stadium: Estadio Nacional; Referee: Erwin Hiegger (NIR)

11 May 1958 Friendly	Liga del Sur (Argentina)	4–3	Argentina	Bahía Blanca
	López 1'; Gamero 30'; Gestoso 36', 54'		Boggio 12'; Infante 50', 78'	Stadium: Estadio Roberto Natalio Carminatti; Referee: R. Turner

21 May 1958 Friendly	Internazionale (Italy)	0–2	Argentina	Milan, Italy
			Rojas 2'; Prado 65'	Stadium: Giuseppe Meazza; Referee: L. Tarchetti (ITA)

29 May 1958 Friendly	Bologna (Italy)	0–1	Argentina	Bologna, Italy
			Menéndez 63'	Stadium: Stadio Littoriale

1 Mar 1959 Friendly	Argentina	2–2	(Argentina) Atlanta	Buenos Aires
	Rodríguez 40'; Sosa 62'		Desanzo 85' (pen.); Artime 87'	Stadium: Monumental de Nuñez; Referee: V. Spinetto (ARG)

12 Apr 1958 Friendly	Grêmio (Brazil)	0–2	Argentina	Porto Alegre, Brazil
			Pando 7', 50'	Stadium: Estádio Olímpico Monumental; Referee: F. Miranda (ARG)

14 Apr 1958 Friendly	Internacional (Brazil)	0–2	Argentina	Porto Alegre, Brazil
			Pedutto 75', 85'	Stadium: Estádio Olímpico Monumental; Referee: F. Miranda (ARG)

25 Feb 1960 Friendly	Argentina	2–2	(Argentina) Atlanta	Buenos Aires
	Dacquarty 53'; Callá 76'		I. Castillo 52'; Bosich 67' (o.g.)	Stadium: Estadio Tomás Adolfo Ducó; Referee: A. Bosolino (ARG)

7 Sep 1960 Friendly	Grêmio (Brazil)	1–0	Argentina	Porto Alegre, Brazil
	Marino 36'			Stadium: Estádio Olímpico Monumental

6 Dec 1960 Friendly	Pichincha XI (Ecuador)	2–0	Argentina	Quito, Ecuador
	E. Guerra 13'; M. Zambrano 16'			Stadium: Estadio Olímpico Atahualpa; Referee: C. Velázquez (COL)

8 Dec 1960 Friendly	América / Deportivo (Colombia)	1–5	Argentina	Cali, Colombia
	Marcolini 49'		Sanfilippo 16'; Sosa 32'; Corbatta 67', 87'; Posoco 84' (o.g.)	Stadium: Estadio Olímpico Pascual Guerrero; Referee: J. Lires López (COL)

2 Apr 1961 Friendly	Liga Tandilense (Argentina)	0–8	Argentina	Tandil
			Reynoso 6', 29', 89'; Mansilla 17', 41', 58'; Canseco 64' (pen.); Garabal 74'	Referee: J. Brozzi (ARG)

25 May 1961 Friendly	Argentina	2–0	Foreigners of Argentina	Buenos Aires
	Sanfilippo 27'; Corbatta 68'			Stadium: Monumental de Nuñez; Referee: Carlos Nay Foino (ARG)

28 Jun 1961 Friendly	Internazionale (Italy)	1–1	Argentina	Milan, Italy
	Morbello 48'		Griguol 33'	Stadium: Giuseppe Meazza; Referee: Ortiz (ESP)

22 Apr 1962 Friendly	Argentina	2–1	(Germany) SC Preußen Münster	Buenos Aires
	Sanfilippo 50'; Oleniak 63'		Geerken 37'	Stadium: Monumental de Nuñez; Referee: J. L. Praddaude (ARG)

25 Apr 1962 Friendly	Argentina	4–2	(Brazil) Internacional	Buenos Aires
	Pagani 36', 49', 85'; Pando 45'		Alfeu 28'; Osvaldinho 65'	Stadium: Monumental de Nuñez; Referee: M. Velarde (ARG)

29 Apr 1962 Friendly	Argentina	1–0	(Spain) Real Zaragoza	Buenos Aires
	Marzolini 66'			Stadium: Monumental de Nuñez; Referee: J. Brozzi (ARG)

3 Mar 1962 Friendly	Argentina	2–0	(Spain) Real Zaragoza	Buenos Aires
	Facundo 9', 71'			Stadium: La Bombonera; Referee: Carlos Nay Foino (ARG)

6 May 1962 Friendly	Argentina	0–0	(Argentina) Boca Juniors / Independiente	Buenos Aires
				Stadium: Estadio Tomás Adolfo Ducó; Referee: J. L. Praddaude (ARG)

18 Dec 1962 Friendly	Argentina	0–1	(Argentina) Boca Juniors	Buenos Aires
			Aimonetti 58'	Stadium: Estadio Tomás Adolfo Ducó; Referee: J. L. Praddaude (ARG)

5 Aug 1964 Friendly	Argentina	3–0	(Argentina) Deportivo Morón	Buenos Aires
	E. Onega 34'; Rojas 38'; E. Fernández 50'			Stadium: Estadio Ferro Carril Oeste; Referee: M. A. Coerezza (ARG)

8 Sep 1964 Friendly	Colón (Argentina)	2–0	Argentina	Santa Fe
	Ríos 10'; Broggi 35'			Stadium: Estadio Brigadier General Estanislao López; Referee: R. Goicoechea (ARG)

30 Mar 1966 Friendly	Argentina	3–1	(Brazil) Botafogo	Buenos Aires
	E. Onega 26'; Más 68'; Rattín 78'		Gérson 8'	Stadium: Monumental de Nuñez; Referee: A. Bossolino (ARG)

6 Apr 1966 Friendly	Argentina	4–2	(Germany) Eintracht Frankfurt	Buenos Aires
	Más 1', 57'; Chaldú 31'; Lallana 47'		W. Solz 48'; W. Huberts 78'	Stadium: Monumental de Nuñez; Referee: Miguel Ángel Comesaña (ARG)

13 Apr 1966 Friendly	Argentina	1–3	(Germany) Eintracht Frankfurt	Buenos Aires
	Lallana 80'		P. Blusch 25'; G. Lechner 59'; H. Trimhold 60'	Stadium: Monumental de Nuñez; Referee: J. L. Praddaude (ARG)

5 May 1966 Friendly	Argentina	1–0	(Italy) Fiorentina	Buenos Aires
	Rojas 49'			Stadium: Monumental de Nuñez; Referee: R. Goicoechea (ARG)

1 Jun 1966 Friendly	Argentina	2–0	(Italy) Cagliari	Buenos Aires
	Tarabini 40'; Sarnari 78'			Stadium: Estadio Gasómetro; Referee: R. Goicoechea (ARG)

17 Jun 1966 Friendly	Stævnet / Alliancen (Denmark)	0–2	Argentina	Copenhagen, Denmark
			Solari 24'; E. Onega 82'	Stadium: Københavns Idrætspark; Referee: C. Hansen (DNK)

25 Jun 1966 Friendly	FK Austria Wien	1–0	Argentina	Vienna, Austria
	Kodat 4'			Stadium: Praterstadion; Referee: J. Lindemayer (AUT)

29 Jun 1966 Friendly	Kremser SC (Austria)	1–3	Argentina	Krems an der Donau, Austria
	Windaver 35' (pen.)		Stewer 44' (o.g.); Sarnari 73'; Artime 75'	Stadium: Sepp-Doll-Stadion

1 Nov 1966 Friendly	Argentina	1–1	(Brazil) Flamengo	Avellaneda
	Bernao 40'		Silva 53'	Stadium: La Doble Visera; Referee: L. Pestarino (ARG)

29 Dec 1966 Friendly	Nacional (Uruguay)	2–0	Argentina	Montevideo, Uruguay
	Oyarbide 50'; Espárrago 64'			Stadium: Estadio Centenario; Referee: Estebán Marino (URU)

6 Jan 1967 Friendly	Liga Mendocina (Argentina)	1–2	Argentina	Mendoza
	Camargo 85'		Veira 52'; Sarnari 72'	Stadium: Víctor Legrotaglie; Referee: L. Pestarino (ARG)

8 Jan 1967 Friendly	Sportivo Desamparados (Argentina)	0–1	Argentina	San Juan
			Artime 11'	Stadium: Estadio El Serpentario; Referee: L. Pestarino (ARG)

30 May 1967 Friendly	Argentina	1–1	(England) Sheffield United	Buenos Aires
	Gennoni		Goal	Stadium: Monumental de Nuñez; Referee: G. Nimo (ARG)

20 Aug 1967 Friendly	LDU Quito (Ecuador)	1–3	Argentina	Quito, Ecuador
	Carrera 2'		D. Onega 30'; Fischer 63'; Gennoni 70'	Stadium: Estadio Olímpico Atahualpa

27 Aug 1967 Trofeo Costa del Sol	Málaga (Spain)	2–2 (a.e.t.) (3–4 p)	Argentina	Málaga, Spain
	Cabral 35' (pen.); Bernal 58'		Wehbe 44'; Zywica 49'	Stadium: La Rosaleda; Referee: F. Rigo (ESP)
	Penalties
			Rogel (penalty scored); Manera (penalty scored); Gennoni (penalty scored); Carone (penalty scored)

29 Aug 1967 Trofeo Costa del Sol	Espanyol (Spain)	2–1 (a.e.t.)	Argentina	Málaga, Spain
	Marcial 40', 115'		D. Onega 49'	Stadium: La Rosaleda; Referee: S. García (POR)

31 Aug 1967 Friendly	Fiorentina (Italy)	1–1	Argentina	Florence, Italy
	Magli 73'		Doval 20'	Stadium: Stadio Artemio Franchi; Referee: Monti (ITA)

3 Sep 1967 Friendly	Lecce (Italy)	0–0	Argentina	Lecce, Italy
				Stadium: Stadio Via del Mare; Referee: Panzino (ITA)

2 Nov 1967 Friendly	Liga Posadeña (Argentina)	1–6	Argentina	Posadas
	Chamorro 57'		Fischer 4', 10', 62', 70'; Savoy 32', 80'	Referee: R. Florindo (ARG)

2 Nov 1967 Friendly	Liga de Comodoro Rivadavia (Argentina)	0–4	Argentina	Comodoro Rivadavia
			Tedesco 22'; E. Onega 33', 88'; Giribet 80'	Stadium: Estadio César Muñoz; Referee: R. Florindo (ARG)

7 Aug 1968 Friendly	Rio de Janeiro	4–1	Argentina	Rio de Janeiro, Brazil
	Valdecir 41; Roberto 47, 75; Jairzinho 87		A.Basile 89	Stadium: Estadio Maracana; Referee: A. Márques (BRA)

11 Aug 1968 Friendly	Minas Gerais	3–2	Argentina	Belo Horizonte, Brazil
	Evaldo 6 Rodrígues 19; Dirceu Lópes 55		A.Rendo 32; A.Silva 77	Stadium: Estadio Mineirao; Referee: A. Martina (BRA)

14 Aug 1968 Friendly	Millonarios (Colombia)	0–1	Argentina	Bogotá, Colombia
			Obberti 82'	Stadium: Estadio El Campín; Referee: J. Lires López (COL)

18 Aug 1968 Friendly	Colombia Olympic	0–1	Argentina	Bogotá, Colombia
			Savoy 90'	Stadium: Estadio El Campín; Referee: J. Varrone (VEN)

24 Aug 1968 Friendly	Botafogo (Brazil)	1–0	Argentina	Caracas, Venezuela
	Jairzinho 54'			Stadium: Estadio Olímpico de la UCV; Referee: I. Barrios (VEN)

25 Sep 1968 Friendly	Liga Salteña (Argentina)	2–4	Argentina	Salta
	Rodríguez 23'; Perfumo 79' (o.g.)		Savoy 40'; Fischer 55'; Yazalde 61'; A. Silva 82'

9 Oct 1968 Friendly	Liga Sanjuanina (Argentina)	1–5	Argentina	San Juan
	Narváez 35'		Rendo 15'; Salomone 23'; P. González 42'; Fischer 75'; Yazalde 85'	Stadium: Estadio Ingeniero Hilario Sánchez; Referee: Alberto Ducatelli (ARG)

15 Feb 1969 Friendly	Bolívar (Bolivia)	0–4	Argentina	La Paz, Bolivia
			Salomone 18'; Aguirre 32'; Perfumo 40' (pen.); Fischer 62'	Stadium: Estadio Hernando Siles; Referee: A. Ortube (BOL)

14 May 1969 Friendly	Rio Grande do Sul	1–1	Argentina	Porto Alegre, Brazil
	Sergio 2'		Perfumo 5'	Stadium: Estádio Beira-Rio; Referee: L. Pestarino (ARG)

25 Jun 1969 Friendly	Argentina	1–1	Rio Grande do Sul	Avellaneda
	Lamelza 7'		Alcindo 75'	Stadium: Estadio Presidente Juan Domingo Perón; Referee: A. Martín (BRA)

25 Feb 1970 Friendly	Liga Cordobesa (Argentina)	1–3	Argentina	Córdoba
	Patire		R. Díaz; P. González; Más	Stadium: Estadio Presidente Perón; Referee: A. Oviedo (ARG)

28 Feb 1970 Friendly	Godoy Cruz (Argentina)	3–2	Argentina	Godoy Cruz
	C. Gómez 7'; O. Garro 29'; A. Castro 32'		Veglio 2'; D. Onega 65'	Stadium: Estadio Feliciano Gambarte; Referee: A. Oviedo (ARG)

30 Dec 1970 Friendly	Argentina	4–3	(Germany) Bayern Munich	Buenos Aires
	Yazalde 39', 47'; Verón 60'; Gramajo 77'		Roth 34'; Müller 49', 56'	Stadium: La Bombonera; Referee: O. Veiró (ARG)

4 Jan 1971 Friendly	Argentina	1–1	(Germany) 1. FC Köln	Buenos Aires
	M. Nicolau 28'		Rupp 61'	Stadium: La Bombonera

19 May 1971 Friendly	Rio Grande do Sul	1–1	Argentina	Porto Alegre, Brazil
	Bráulio 56'		Fischer 68'	Stadium: Estádio Beira-Rio; Referee: Miguel Ángel Comesaña (ARG)

8 Mar 1972 Friendly	Liga Salteña (Argentina)	1–4	Argentina	Salta
	Ávila		Biachi; Brindisi; Más

11 Jun 1972 Taça Independência	Argentina	2–0	(African Union) Africa XI	Aracaju, Brazil
	Fischer 40'; Mastrángelo 42'	Report		Stadium: Batistão; Attendance: 12.826; Referee: José Faville Neto (BRA)

18 Jun 1972 Taça Independência	Argentina	7–0	CONCACAF XI	Maceió, Brazil
	Fischer 26', 68', 81', 86'; Más 12', 65'; Bianchi 70'	Report		Stadium: Estádio Rei Pelé; Attendance: 8.587; Referee: Paul Schiller (AUT)

18 Oct 1972 Friendly	Liga Tucumana (Argentina)	0–3	Argentina	San Miguel de Tucumán
			Brindisi 32', 49'; Ayala 65'	Stadium: Estadio Monumental José Fierro; Referee: A. Ithurralde (ARG)

31 Jan 1973 Friendly	Liga Tandilense (Argentina)	0–6	Argentina	Tandil
			Brindisi; Ayala; Heredia; Alonso; Ghiso	Referee: L. Pestarino (ARG)

15 Apr 1973 Friendly	Argentina	1–1	(Brazil) Palmeiras	Avellaneda
	Brindisi 65'		César Maluco 44'	Stadium: Estadio Presidente Juan Domingo Perón; Referee: O. Veiró (ARG)

9 Jul 1973 Friendly	Argentina	3–0	(Argentina) Olimpia 73	Buenos Aires
	Brindisi 69' (pen.); Alonso 79'; Houseman 85'			Stadium: Estadio José Amalfitani; Referee: A. Coerezza (ARG)

29 Jul 1973 Friendly	Sarmiento de Junín (Argentina)	1–5	Argentina	Junín
	Passarella 87' (pen.)		Brindisi 11', 37'; Ayala 22'; Avallay 49'; Ponce 62'	Referee: J. Romero (ARG)

8 Aug 1973 Friendly	Instituto de Córdoba (Argentina)	1–2	Argentina	Córdoba
	Pellascini 83' (pen.)		Avallay 24'; Guerini 77'	Stadium: Estadio Presidente Perón; Referee: Alberto Ducatelli (ARG)

14 Aug 1973 Friendly	Atlético de Madrid (Spain)	1–1	Argentina	Madrid, Spain
	Becerra 8'		Ayala 75'	Stadium: Estadio Vicente Calderón; Referee: Soto Montesinos

18 Aug 1973 Friendly	Málaga (Spain)	3–4	Argentina	Málaga, Spain
	Orozco 15'; Bustillo 17', 40'		Ayala 35'; Guerini 60'; Brindisi 77', 84'	Stadium: La Rosaleda; Referee: Navarrete

25 Aug 1973 Friendly	Las Palmas (Spain)	2–1	Argentina	Las Palmas, Spain
	Germán 42' (pen.); Paez 74'		Chazarreta 60'	Stadium: Estadio Insular; Referee: Hernández Quintana (ESP)

27 Aug 1973 Friendly	Újpest (Hungary)	0–2	Argentina	Las Palmas, Spain
			Brindisi 65'; Balbuena 80'	Stadium: Estadio Insular; Referee: Merino González (ESP)

13 Sep 1973 Friendly	Huracán Corrientes (Argentina)	2–1	Argentina	Corrientes
	Segovia 48'; Arriola 54'		Heredia 72' (pen.)	Stadium: Estadio José Antonio Romero Feris

13 Sep 1973 Friendly	Deportivo Mandiyú (Argentina)	1–4	Argentina	Corrientes
	Romero 77'		Chazarreta 9'; Guerini 21'; Ayala 53'; Balbuena 74'	Stadium: Estadio José Antonio Romero Feris

21 Nov 1973 Friendly	Liga Santafesina (Argentina)	1–1	Argentina	Santa Fe
	Di Meola 56'		Aricó 41'	Stadium: Estadio Brigadier General Estanislao López; Referee: Alberto Ducatelli (ARG)

13 Mar 1974 Friendly	Sportivo Pedal (Argentina)	1–2	Argentina	San Rafael
	Cepeda 14'		Chazarreta 45'; Balbuena 65'	Referee: T. Nitti (ARG)

20 Mar 1974 Friendly	Liga Ríocuartense (Argentina)	0–4	Argentina	Río Cuarto
			Santamaría 32'; Potente 34'; Avallay 42'; Cocco 60'	Referee: R. Goicoechea (ARG)

27 Mar 1974 Friendly	Colegiales de Villa Mercedes (Argentina)	1–4	Argentina	San Luis
	Barroso 21'		Bertoni 15'; Brindisi 70'; Potente 75', 87'	Referee: A. Ithurralde (ARG)

3 Apr 1974 Friendly	Atlético Tucumán (Argentina)	0–2	Argentina	San Miguel de Tucumán
			Bertoni 62'; Chazarreta 70'	Stadium: Estadio Monumental José Fierro; Referee: A. Coerezza (ARG)

11 Apr 1974 Friendly	Aldosivi (Argentina)	0–1	Argentina	Tandil
			Potente 7'	Referee: S. García (ARG)

17 Apr 1974 Friendly	Liga Rosarina (Argentina)	3–1	Argentina	Rosario
	J.J. González 7'; Obberti 38'; Kempes 52'		Poy 71'	Stadium: El Coloso del Parque; Referee: A. Ithurralde (ARG)

26 Apr 1974 Friendly	Belgrano de Córdoba (Argentina)	1–1	Argentina	Córdoba
	Ardiles 62'		Balbuena 73'	Stadium: El Gigante de Alberdi; Referee: A. Ithurralde (ARG)

14 May 1974 Friendly	Granada (Spain)	0–0	Argentina	Granada, Spain
				Stadium: Estadio de Los Cármenes; Referee: Urrestarazu

30 May 1974 Friendly	Fiorentina (Italy)	2–0	Argentina	Florence, Italy
	Speggiorin 39'; Desolati 87'			Stadium: Stadio Artemio Franchi; Referee: A. Ithurralde (ARG)

3 Jun 1974 Friendly	1860 Munich (Germany)	0–1	Argentina	Munich, West Germany
			Balbuena 65'	Stadium: Olympiastadion; Referee: Beth

29 Aug 1974 Friendly	Argentina	2–2	(Argentina) Boca Juniors / River Plate	Buenos Aires
	Tarantini (o.g.); Rocchia		García Cambón; Morete	Stadium: Estadio José Amalfitani

29 Aug 1974 Friendly	Argentina	4–2	(Argentina) Lanús	Buenos Aires
	Saccardi; Bochini; J.J. López; Ferrero		Ferreyra; Rojas	Stadium: Estadio José Amalfitani

16 Mar 1975 Friendly	Goiás	0–1	Argentina	Goiânia, Brazil
			Arroyo 43'	Stadium: Estádio Serra Dourada; Referee: O. Scolfaro

19 Jun 1975 Friendly	Talleres de Córdoba (Argentina)	1–1	Argentina	Córdoba
	Bocanelli 65'		Valencia 26'	Stadium: Estadio Chateau Carreras

30 Jun 1975 Friendly	Talleres de Córdoba (Argentina)	0–2	Argentina	Córdoba
			Ocaño 6' (o.g.); Luque 19'	Stadium: Estadio Chateau Carreras

7 Feb 1976 Friendly	Kimberley (Argentina)	0–3	Argentina	Mar del Plata
			J.J. López 6'; Houseman 73'; Luque 81'	Stadium: Gral. San Martín; Referee: A. Ithurralde (ARG)

9 Feb 1976 Friendly	Excursionistas (Argentina)	1–3	Argentina	Mar del Plata
	Méndez 86'		Ortiz 2'; Luque 4'; Scotta 22'	Stadium: Gral. San Martín; Referee: A. Ithurralde (ARG)

30 Mar 1976 Friendly	Hertha BSC (Germany)	2–1	Argentina	Berlin, West Germany
	Diefenbach 34'; Hermandung 53'		Luque 4'	Stadium: Olympiastadion; Referee: K. Ohmsen

1 Apr 1976 Friendly	Sevilla (Spain)	0–0	Argentina	Seville, Spain
				Stadium: Estadio Ramón Sánchez Pizjuán; Referee: Sánchez del Río (ESP)

5 May 1976 Friendly	Talleres de Córdoba (Argentina)	1–1	Argentina	Córdoba
	Fachetti 59'		Binello 6' (o.g.)	Stadium: Estadio Chateau Carreras; Referee: J. Fasetta (ARG)

8 Jul 1976 Friendly	Argentina	4–0	Rest of Argentina	Buenos Aires
	Ardiles 19'; Luque 20'; Houseman 77'; Villa 87'			Stadium: Estadio José Amalfitani; Referee: H. Dellacasa (ARG)

22 Sep 1976 Friendly	Aldosivi (Argentina)	0–6	Argentina	Mar del Plata
			Beltrán; Saldaño; Bertoni; Luque	Stadium: Gral. San Martín

30 Jan 1977 Friendly	Newell's Old Boys (Argentina)	2–2	Argentina	Mar del Plata
	Moyano 32'; Irigoyen 61'		Villa 60'; Bertoni 89'	Stadium: Gral. San Martín; Referee: Alberto Ducatelli (ARG)

7 Feb 1977 Friendly	Aldosivi (Argentina)	0–1	Argentina	Mar del Plata
			Felman 29' (pen.)	Stadium: Gral. San Martín; Referee: L. Pestarino (ARG)

9 Feb 1977 Friendly	River Plate (Argentina)	2–2	Argentina	Mar del Plata
	Marchetti 52'; Ártico 72'		Bertoni 31'; Ardiles 37'	Stadium: Gral. San Martín; Referee: R. Barreiro (ARG)

16 Feb 1977 Friendly	Boca Juniors (Argentina)	0–1	Argentina	Mar del Plata
			Bertoni 25'	Stadium: Gral. San Martín; Referee: J. Romero (ARG)

2 Mar 1977 Friendly	Deportivo Roca (Argentina)	1–2	Argentina	General Roca
	Travesino 36'		Villa 49'; Bertoni 55'	Stadium: Luis Maiolino

24 Mar 1977 75th Anniv. Real Madrid	Real Madrid (Spain)	1–0	Argentina	Madrid, Spain
	Bosque 82'			Stadium: Estadio Santiago Bernabeu; Referee: E. Guruceta

4 Mar 1978 Friendly	Argentina	0–0	(Uruguay) MUFP	Mar del Plata
				Stadium: Estadio General San Martín

22 Apr 1978 Friendly	Liga Tandilense (Argentina)	0–1	Argentina	Tandil
			Bertoni 5' (pen.)

30 Apr 1978 Friendly	Cipolletti (Argentina)	0–2	Argentina	Cipolletti
			Bertoni 51' (pen.); Gallego 66'	Stadium: La Visera de Cemento

7 May 1978 Friendly	Liga Correntina (Argentina)	1–2	Argentina	Corrientes
	Taboada 7'		Alonso 26'; Chávez 56' (o.g.)	Referee: Alberto Ducatelli (ARG)

13 May 1978 Friendly	Liga del Sur (Argentina)	0–7	Argentina	Bahía Blanca
			H. Bravo 23', 63'; Kempes 31', 32'; Larrosa 38', 79'; Oviedo 60'	Stadium: Estadio Roberto Natalio Carminatti; Referee: A. Correazza (ARG)

16 May 1978 Friendly	Liga Cordobesa (Argentina)	1–3	Argentina	Córdoba
	Moreschini 54'		Kempes 52'; Houseman 86'; Luque 89'	Stadium: Estadio Chateau Carreras; Referee: R. Barreiro (ARG)

18 Apr 1979 Friendly	Gutiérrez SC (Argentina)	2–5	Argentina	Mendoza
	P. Fernández 43'; E. Brandán 65'		J. García 1'; Houseman 15'; Reinaldi 28'; Maradona 40'; Perotti 78'	Stadium: Estadio Malvinas Argentinas; Referee: G. D'Ippolito

9 May 1979 Friendly	Liga Cordobesa (Argentina)	2–5	Argentina	Córdoba
	Beltrán 14'; Astegiano 76'		Reinaldi 39'; Maradona 50', 60'; Passarella 83' (pen.); Gallego 90'	Stadium: Estadio Chateau Carreras; Referee: J. Romero (ARG)

6 Jun 1979 Friendly	New York Cosmos (United States)	0–1	Argentina	East Rutherford, United States
			Passarella 89'	Stadium: Giants Stadium; Referee: G. D'Ippolito

25 Jun 1979 1st Anniv. of World Cup title	Argentina	1–2	(United Nations) Rest of the World	Buenos Aires
	Maradona 28'	Report	Galván 68' (o.g.); Zico 73'	Stadium: Monumental de Nuñez; Attendance: 82,000; Referee: Abraham Klein (ISR)

10 Apr 1980 Friendly	Gutiérrez SC (Argentina)	0–8	Argentina	Mendoza
			Maradona 14'; Passarella 30' (pen.), 49' (pen.); Valencia 55'; R. Díaz 36', 84'; Calderón 81'; Fren 87'	Stadium: Estadio Malvinas Argentinas; Referee: G. D'Ippolito

30 Apr 1980 Friendly	Argentina	1–0	Republic of Ireland	Buenos Aires
	Maradona 57'			Stadium: Monumental de Nuñez; Referee: R. Cerullo (URU)

26 Nov 1980 Friendly	Liga Mendocina (Argentina)	0–4	Argentina	Mendoza
			Débole 11'; Barbas 38'; R. Díaz 41'; Passarella 84' (pen.)	Stadium: Estadio Malvinas Argentinas; Referee: J. Romero (ARG)

12 Dec 1980 Friendly	Liga de Comodoro Rivadavia (Argentina)	0–5	Argentina	Comodoro Rivadavia
			Gallego 7'; R. Díaz 24', 66'; Maradona 57'; Luque 60'	Stadium: Estadio César Muñoz; Referee: R. Florindo (ARG)

16 Jul 1981 Friendly	Liga Formoseña (Argentina)	2–4	Argentina	Formosa
	Chamorro 84'; Chaparro 87' (pen.)		Maradona 12', 60'; R. Díaz 39'; Valencia 78'	Stadium: Estadio Antonio Romero; Referee: T. Nitti (ARG)

22 Jul 1981 Friendly	Argentina	3–2	(Paraguay) Libertad	Buenos Aires
	Ferrero 7', 29'; R. Díaz 71'		Gómez 22'; Rioja 52'	Stadium: Monumental de Nuñez

5 Aug 1981 Friendly	Godoy Cruz (Argentina)	0–4	Argentina	Mendoza
			R. Díaz 41', 86'; Passarella 60'; Maradona 79'	Stadium: Estadio Malvinas Argentinas; Referee: Abel Gnecco (ARG)

22 Aug 1981 Friendly	Valencia (Spain)	0–1	Argentina	Valencia, Spain
			R. Díaz 56'	Stadium: Estadio Luis Casanova; Referee: Sánchez Arminio (ESP)

25 Aug 1981 Friendly	Hércules (Spain)	0–2	Argentina	Alicante, Spain
			R. Díaz 32', 48'	Stadium: Estadio José Rico Pérez; Referee: Andújar Oliver (ESP)

29 Aug 1981 Friendly	Fiorentina (Italy)	3–5	Argentina	Florence, Italy
	Casagrande 24'; Massaro 29'; Bertoni 51'		Passarella 48', 57' (pen.); Barbas 66'; Maradona 68', 70'	Stadium: Stadio Artemio Franchi; Referee: Menicucci (ITA)

1 Sep 1981 Friendly	Barcelona (Spain)	1–0	Argentina	Barcelona, Spain
	Simonsen 76'			Stadium: Camp Nou; Referee: E. Negreira (ESP)

26 May 1982 Friendly	Argentina	1–0	(Portugal) Benfica	Buenos Aires
	Kempes 48'			Stadium: Monumental de Nuñez; Referee: Abel Gnecco (ARG)

6 Jun 1982 Friendly	Villajoyosa CF (Spain)	0–15	Argentina	Villajoyosa, Spain
			Kempes 12', 64', 67'; Bertoni 14'; R. Díaz 23', 34'; Ardiles 25', 57'; P. Hernández 62', 71', 87'; Barbas 77', 79'; Valdano 81'; Passarella 83'	Stadium: Estadio Nou Pla; Referee: Torres Giménez (ESP)

28 Feb 1985 Friendly	Liga Mendocina (Argentina)	1–2	Argentina	Mendoza
	C. Rodríguez 17'		Pasculli 35'; Burruchaga 59'	Stadium: Estadio Malvinas Argentinas; Referee: T. Nitti (ARG)

29 Mar 1986 Friendly	Napoli (Italy)	1–2	Argentina	Naples, Italy
	Pecci 40'		Pasculli 6'; Garré 11'	Stadium: Stadio San Paolo; Referee: Pietro D'Elía (ITA)

1 Apr 1986 Friendly	Grasshopper (Switzerland)	0–1	Argentina	Zürich, Switzerland
			Almirón 78'	Stadium: Hardturm; Referee: Kurt Roethlissbert (SWI)

15 May 1986 Friendly	Junior de Barranquilla (Colombia)	0–0	Argentina	Barranquilla, Colombia
				Stadium: Estadio Metropolitano Roberto Meléndez; Referee: R. Palacio (COL)

19 Mar 1987 Friendly	Roma (Italy)	2–1	Argentina	Rome, Italy
	Boniek 31', 61'		C. Tapia 15'	Stadium: Stadio Olimpico; Referee: Marco Longhi (ITA)

22 May 1989 Friendly	Ternana (Italy)	2–7	Argentina	Termi, Italy
	Eritreo 15', 73'		Pasculli 8'; Caniggia 12', 28', 67'; Maradona 20', 38'; Ruggeri 24'	Stadium: Stadio Libero Liberati; Referee: Agnolin (ITA)

10 Jan 1990 Friendly	AS Monaco (France)	2–0	Argentina	Monaco
	Touré 25'; Fofana 55'			Stadium: Stade Louis II; Referee: Claude Bouillet (FRA)

14 Jan 1990 Friendly	Guatemala	0–0	Argentina	Guatemala City, Guatemala
				Stadium: Estadio Mateo Flores

3 Apr 1990 Friendly	Linfield (Northern Ireland)	0–1	Argentina	Belfast, Northern Ireland
			Lorenzo 4'	Stadium: Windsor Park

25 May 1990 Friendly	Valencia (Spain)	1–1	Argentina	Valencia, Spain
	Cuxart 38'		Dezotti 49'	Stadium: Estadio Luis Casanova; Referee: Ansuategui Roca

25 Sep 1991 75th Ann. CSF Cup	Argentina	2–1	Americas XI	Buenos Aires
	Ruggeri 9'; C. García 34' (pen.)		R. Cabañas 7'	Stadium: Monumental de Nuñez; Referee: Ernesto Filippi (URU)

29 Oct 1991 Friendly	Argentina	3–0	(United Nations) Rest of the World	Buenos Aires
	Latorre 33', 69'; L. Rodríguez 40'			Stadium: Monumental de Nuñez; Referee: Abel Gnecco (ARG)

14 Nov 1999 RCD Espanyol Centenary	Espanyol (Spain)	2–0	Argentina	Barcelona, Spain
	Posse 18'; Roger 59'			Stadium: Estadi Olímpic de Montjuïc; Referee: A. Llonch Andreu (ESP)

=== 2000–present ===
29 December 2004 Friendly	Catalonia	0–3	Argentina	Barcelona, Spain
21:30		Report	Scaloni 1'; Rodríguez 52'; Galletti 75'	Stadium: Camp Nou; Attendance: 65.320; Referee: Xavier Moreno (ESP)

22 December 2009 Friendly	Catalonia	4–2	Argentina	Barcelona, Spain
20:30	S. García 44'; Bojan 56'; Sergio 70' (pen.); Hurtado 76'	Report	Pastore 63'; Di María 72'	Stadium: Camp Nou; Attendance: 53,000; Referee: Alfonso Álvarez (ESP)

== Specific matches ==
The Copa Raúl Colombo (English: Raúl Colombo Cup), was a friendly tournament realized between Argentina and Rio de Janeiro state team, on December 5, 1956. The competition was held to salute Raúl H. Colombo, newly elected president of the AFA. Colombo remained as president of the association until 1964.

== Notes ==
1. Protesting against an Argentine newspaper that published a picture of the Brazilian team drawn as monkeys, some players refused to play and the Brazilian team started the match with only seven Brazilian players and completed by four Argentine players (Baigorri, Antonio Rosado, Emilio Solari and Castro). The crowd protested against the Argentine reinforces in Brazilian team and the match was finally realized with only seven players in each team.
2. Playing as Federación Guipuzcoana de Fútbol.
3. Matches organized by the Sports Writers Circles of Uruguay and Argentina. Considered official by AUF and don't recognized by AFA.
4. Two simultaneous games were played to benefit the victims of the 1944 San Juan earthquake. Considered official by AUF and don't recognized by AFA.
5. The Football Association of Ireland does not recognize this game as official, because Ireland only used players who played in their local league.
