= 1999–2000 Primera B Nacional =

14th season of the second-tier football league in Argentina

Primera B Nacional
- Season: 1999–00
- Champions: Huracán (2nd divisional title)
- Promoted: Huracán; Los Andes; Almagro
- Relegated: Deportivo Español; Gimnasia y Tiro; Argentino (R); Deportivo Morón; Aldosivi; Temperley
- Top goalscorer: Gastón Casas 30 goals

The 1999–00 Argentine Primera B Nacional was the 14th season of second division professional of football in Argentina. 34 teams competed; the champion and runner-up were promoted to Argentine Primera División.

== Club information ==
=== Interior Zone ===
Club	City	Stadium
Aldosivi	Mar del Plata	José María Minella
Almirante Brown	Arrecifes	Estadio Municipal
Atlético de Rafaela	Rafaela	Nuevo Monumental
Atlético Tucumán	San Miguel de Tucumán	Monumental Presidente Jose Fierro
Cipolletti	Cipolletti	La Visera de Cemento
Gimnasia y Esgrima	Concepción del Uruguay	Manuel y Ramón Núñez
Gimnasia y Tiro	Salta	Gigante del Norte
Godoy Cruz	Mendoza	Malvinas Argentinas
Independiente Rivadavia	Mendoza	Bautista Gargantini
Juventud Antoniana	Salta	Fray Honorato Pistoia
Olimpo	Bahía Blanca	Roberto Natalio Carminatti
Racing	Córdoba	Miguel Sancho
San Martín	Mendoza	San Martín
San Martín	San Juan	Ing. Hilario Sánchez
San Martín	San Miguel de Tucumán	La Ciudadela
Villa Mitre	Bahía Blanca	El Fortín

=== Metropolitana Zone ===
Club	City	Stadium
All Boys	Floresta	Islas Malvinas
Almagro	José Ingenieros	Tres de Febrero
Argentino	Rosario	José María Olaeta
Arsenal	Sarandí	Julio H. Grondona
Banfield	Banfield	Florencio Solá
Central Córdoba	Rosario	Gabino Sosa
Defensa y Justicia	Florencio Varela	Norberto "Tito" Tomaghello
Deportivo Español	Parque Avellaneda	Nueva España
Deportivo Morón	Morón	Francisco Urbano
El Porvenir	Gerli	Gildo Francisco Ghersinich
Huracán	Parque Patricios	Tomás Adolfo Ducó
Los Andes	Lomas de Zamora	Eduardo Gallardón
Nueva Chicago	Mataderos	Nueva Chicago
Platense	Florida	Ciudad de Vicente López
Quilmes	Quilmes	Centenario
San Miguel	Los Polvorines	Malvinas Argentinas
Temperley	Temperley	Alfredo Beranger
Tigre	Victoria	José Dellagiovanna

== Interior Zone Standings ==
Pos	Team	Pld	W	D	L	GF	GA	GD	Pts	Qualification
1	Atlético de Rafaela	30	16	3	11	42	35	+7	51	Promotion Playoff
2	San Martín (M)	30	14	8	8	45	31	+14	50	Promotion Playoff
3	San Martín (SJ)	30	13	10	7	41	32	+9	49	Second Promotion Playoff
4	Gimnasia y Esgrima (CdU)	30	13	8	9	40	32	+8	47	Second Promotion Playoff
5	Juventud Antoniana	30	14	4	12	44	43	+1	46	Second Promotion Playoff
6	Independiente Rivadavia	30	13	6	11	52	53	−1	45	Second Promotion Playoff
7	Godoy Cruz	30	12	7	11	42	37	+5	43	
8	Villa Mitre	30	11	8	11	39	34	+5	41	
9	Olimpo	30	10	11	9	42	43	−1	41	
10	Gimnasia y Tiro	30	11	7	12	41	42	−1	40	
11	Almirante Brown (A)	30	10	10	10	40	42	−2	40	
12	Racing (C)	30	9	11	10	44	44	0	38	
13	Aldosivi	30	7	10	13	38	47	−9	31	
14	Atlético Tucumán	30	10	8	12	39	34	+5	29 (Note: 9 points deducted due to incidents)	
15	San Martín (T)	30	6	10	14	25	46	−21	28	
16	Cipolletti	30	5	11	14	26	45	−19	23 (Note: 3 points deducted due to incidents)	

== Metropolitana Zone Standings ==
Pos	Team	Pld	W	D	L	GF	GA	GD	Pts	Qualification
1	Huracán	34	18	10	6	71	38	+33	64	Promotion Playoff
2	Quilmes	34	17	12	5	62	42	+20	63	Promotion Playoff
3	Los Andes	34	16	15	3	47	31	+16	63	Second Promotion Playoff
4	Almagro	34	17	11	6	72	42	+30	62	Second Promotion Playoff
5	Banfield	34	18	8	8	48	28	+20	59 (Note: 3 points deducted due to incidents)	Second Promotion Playoff
6	Arsenal	34	14	13	7	47	32	+15	55	Second Promotion Playoff
7	Defensa y Justicia	34	13	13	8	47	34	+13	52	
8	El Porvenir	34	13	11	10	44	31	+13	50	
9	Tigre	34	12	9	13	40	37	+3	45	
10	Platense	34	11	12	11	47	51	−4	45	
11	Central Córdoba (R)	34	9	11	14	36	53	−17	38	
12	Deportivo Español	34	9	10	15	38	57	−19	37	
13	San Miguel	34	6	17	11	33	37	−4	35	
14	Nueva Chicago	34	5	18	11	25	41	−16	33	
15	Argentino (R)	34	7	9	18	37	55	−18	30	
16	All Boys	34	6	11	17	32	59	−27	29	
17	Temperley	34	4	13	17	27	55	−28	25	
18	Deportivo Morón	34	3	13	18	28	58	−30	22	

== Promotion Playoff ==
The Promotion Playoff was played by the teams placed 1st and 2nd of each zone. The winning team was declared champion and was automatically promoted to Primera División. The teams that lost in semifinal joined into the Quarterfinals of the Second Promotion Playoff, and the team that lost in the final joined in the semifinal of the Second Promotion Playoff.

=== Semifinals ===
Team 1	Agg.	Team 2	1st leg	2nd leg
Semifinals
Atlético de Rafaela	0-2	Quilmes	0–2	0–0
Semifinals
Huracán^{1}	2–2	San Martín (M)	2-1	0-1

1: Qualified because of sport advantage.

=== Final ===
Championship playoff
17 June 2000
First leg

Quilmes	0–1	Huracán
Casas

Estadio Centenario, Quilmes

25 June 2000
Second leg

Huracán	1–1	Quilmes
Di Carlo 89'	Report	Domínguez 46'

Estadio Tomás Ducó, Buenos Aires

Team details

Huracán
Quilmes

GK	1	(Argentina) Martín Ríos
DF	4	(Argentina) Rodolfo Graieb
DF	2	(Uruguay) Sebastián Morquio
DF	6	(Paraguay) Dani Cáceres
DF	3	(Argentina) Fernando Moner
MF	8	(Argentina) Lucho González
MF	5	(Argentina) Fabián Carrizo
MF	10	(Argentina) Cristian Saboredo
FW	7	(Argentina) Alberto Godoy
FW	9	(Argentina) Gastón Casas
FW	11	(Paraguay) Derlis Soto
Substitutes:
FW		Fernando Di Carlo	(substituted on) a'
Manager:
(Argentina) Carlos Babington

GK	1	(Argentina) Gustavo Lema
DF	4	(Argentina) Humberto Váttimos
DF	2	(Argentina) Alejandro Baigorria
DF	6	(Argentina) Hernán Biasotto
DF	3	(Argentina) Martín Morello
MF	8	(Argentina) Marcos Bartalay
MF	5	(Argentina) Ceferino Díaz
MF	10	(Argentina) Adrián Giampietri
MF	7	(Argentina) Fabio Lenguita	Red card
FW	9	(Argentina) Adrián Czornomaz
FW	11	(Argentina) Alejandro Domínguez	Red card
Manager:
(Argentina) Ricardo Rezza

Note: Huracán won 2–1 on aggregate, promoting to Primera División

== Second Promotion Playoff ==
The Second Promotion Playoff or Torneo Reducido was played by the teams placed 3rd to 6th of each zone. Atlético de Rafaela and San Martín (M) joined in the Quarterfinals, and Quilmes joined in the Semifinals. The winner was promoted to Primera División.

=== Bracket ===
Round of 16
4I	Gimnasia y Esgrima (CdU)	0	1	1
5M	Banfield	1	1	2
3M	Los Andes	0	2	2
6I	Independiente Rivadavia	0	0	0
4M	Almagro	3	4	7
5I	Juventud Antoniana	4	0	4
3I	San Martín (SJ)	1	1	2
6M	Arsenal	1	2	3

Quarterfinals
2I	San Martín (M)	2	1	3
5M	Banfield	5	1	6
3M	Los Andes	0	1	1
4M	Almagro	0	0	0
1I	Atlético de Rafaela	1	2	3
6M	Arsenal	1	0	1

Semifinals
3M	Los Andes	0	2	2
5M	Banfield	0	0	0
2M	Quilmes ^{1}	1	0	1
1I	Atlético de Rafaela	1	0	1

Finals
2M	Quilmes	0	1	1
3M	Los Andes	2	1	3

1: Qualified because of sport advantage.

- Note: The team in the first line plays at home the second leg.

=== Match details ===
1999–2000 Second Promotion Playoff
8 July 2000
First leg

Los Andes	2–0	Quilmes
Ferrer; Arce

Estadio Eduardo Gallardón, Lomas de Zamora

16 July 2000
Second leg

Quilmes	1–1	Los Andes
Czornomaz 17'	Report	Pieters 82'

Estadio Centenario Ciudad de Quilmes, Quilmes
Referee: Horacio Elizondo

Team details

Quilmes
Los Andes

GK	1	Gustavo Lema
DF	2	Alejandro Baigorria
DF	3	Jorge Balanda (substituted off) 79'
DF	6	Hernán Biasotto (substituted off) 45'
MF	4	Humberto Váttimos
MF	5	Ceferino Díaz
MF	7	Fabio Lenguita
MF	8	Rodrigo Braña
FW	10	Adrián Giampietri
FW	9	Adrián Czornomaz
FW	11	Alejandro Domínguez (substituted off) 86'
Substitutes:
MF		Marcos Barlatay	(substituted on) 45'
MF		Cristian Quiñonez	(substituted on) 79'
DF		Leonardo Lemos	(substituted on) 86'
Manager:
(Argentina) Ricardo Rezza

GK	1	Darío Sala
DF	4	Andrés Bressán
DF	6	Gabriel Lobos
DF	3	Marcelo Moya
MF	2	Germán Noce
MF	5	Mauricio Levato
MF	8	Sebastián Salomón
MF	7	Juan Raúl Arce (substituted off) 38'
FW	10	Enrique Romero
FW	11	Felipe Desagastizabal (substituted off) 79'
FW	9	Rubén Ferrer
Substitutes:
MF		Fabio Pieters	(substituted on) 38'
FW		Gabriel Caiafa	(substituted on) 79'
Manager:
(Argentina) Jorge Ginarte

Note: Los Andes won 3–1 on aggregate, promoting to Primera División.

== Promotion Playoff Primera División-Primera B Nacional ==
The best two teams of the overall standings that were not promoted (Quilmes and Almagro) played against the 18th and the 17th placed of the Relegation Table of 1999–2000 Primera División.

Team 1	Agg.	Team 2	1st leg	2nd leg
Relegation/promotion playoff 1
Almagro	2-1	Instituto	1-0	1–1
Relegation/promotion playoff 2
Quilmes	4-4	Belgrano	3-1	1-3

- Almagro was promoted to 2000–01 Primera División by winning the playoff and Instituto was relegated to the 2000–01 Primera B Nacional.
- Belgrano remains in Primera División after a 4-4 aggregate tie by virtue of a "sports advantage". In case of a tie in goals, the team from the Primera División gets to stay in it.

== Relegation ==
Note: Clubs with indirect affiliation with AFA are relegated to the Torneo Argentino A, while clubs directly affiliated face relegation to Primera B Metropolitana. Clubs with direct affiliation are all from Greater Buenos Aires, with the exception of Newell's, Rosario Central, Central Córdoba and Argentino de Rosario, all from Rosario, and Unión and Colón from Santa Fe.

=== Interior Zone ===
Pos	Team	1997–98 Pts	1998–99 Pts	1999–00 Pts	Total Pts	Total Pld	Avg	Situation	Affiliation
1	Atlético de Rafaela	45	44	51	140	90	1.556		Indirect
2	Juventud Antoniana	—	46	46	92	60	1.533		Indirect
3	Independiente Rivadavia	—	—	45	45	30	1.5		Indirect
4	San Martín (SJ)	48	36	49	133	90	1.478		Indirect
5	Atlético Tucumán	43	57	29	129	90	1.433		Indirect
6	Almirante Brown (A)	45	42	40	127	90	1.411		Indirect
7	Gimnasia y Esgrima (CdU)	—	37	47	84	60	1.4		Indirect
8	Villa Mitre	—	—	41	41	30	1.367		Indirect
9	San Martín (T)	43	51	52	121	90	1.344		Indirect
10	San Martín (M)	50	57	36	116	90	1.289		Indirect
11	Godoy Cruz	50	57	36	115	90	1.278		Indirect
12	Racing (C)	—	—	38	38	30	1.267		Indirect
13	Olimpo	29	43	41	113	90	1.256		Indirect
14	Cipolletti	34	53	23	110	90	1.222		Indirect
15	Gimnasia y Tiro	—	33	40	73	60	1.217	Torneo Argentino A	Indirect
16	Aldosivi	36	42	31	109	90	1.211	Torneo Argentino A	Indirect

=== Metropolitana Zone ===
Pos	Team	1997–98 Pts	1998–99 Pts	1999–00 Pts	Total Pts	Total Pld	Avg	Situation	Affiliation
1	Huracán	—	—	64	64	34	1.882		Direct
2	Banfield	62	43	59	164	96	1.708		Direct
3	Arsenal	46	57	55	158	96	1.646		Direct
4	Quilmes	48	47	63	158	96	1.646		Direct
5	El Porvenir	—	45	50	95	66	1.439		Direct
6	Defensa y Justicia	42	44	52	138	96	1.438		Direct
7	Los Andes	48	28	63	138	96	1.438		Direct
8	Central Córdoba (R)	48	43	38	129	96	1.344		Direct
9	Tigre	—	43	45	88	66	1.333		Direct
10	Platense	—	—	45	45	34	1.324		Direct
11	All Boys	46	51	29	126	96	1.313		Direct
12	San Miguel	45	43	35	123	96	1.281		Direct
13	Almagro	22	36	62	120	96	1.25		Direct
14	Nueva Chicago	40	44	33	117	96	1.219		Direct
15	Deportivo Español	—	43	37	80	66	1.212	Primera B Metropolitana	Direct
16	Argentino (R)	—	—	30	30	34	0.882	Primera B Metropolitana	Direct
17	Deportivo Morón	30	28	22	80	96	0.833	Primera B Metropolitana	Direct
18	Temperley	—	—	25	25	34	0.735	Primera B Metropolitana	Direct

== See also ==
- 1999–2000 in Argentine football
