= 1997–98 Primera B Nacional =

12th season of the second-tier football league in Argentina

Primera B Nacional
- Season: 1997–98
- Champions: Talleres (C) (1st divisional title)
- Promoted: Talleres (C); Belgrano
- Relegated: Almirante Brown; Sportivo Italiano; Chaco For Ever
- Top goalscorer: Alejandro Glaría 30 goals

The 1997–98 Argentine Primera B Nacional was the 12th season of second division professional of football in Argentina. A total of 32 teams competed; the champion and runner-up were promoted to Argentine Primera División.

== Club information ==
=== Interior Zone ===
Club	City	Stadium
Aldosivi	Mar del Plata	José María Minella
Almirante Brown	Arrecifes	Estadio Municipal
Atlético de Rafaela	Rafaela	Nuevo Monumental
Atlético Tucumán	San Miguel de Tucumán	Monumental Presidente Jose Fierro
Belgrano	Córdoba	El Gigante de Alberdi
Chaco For Ever	Resistencia	Juan Alberto García
Cipolletti	Cipolletti	La Visera de Cemento
Douglas Haig	Pergamino	Miguel Morales
Godoy Cruz	Mendoza	Malvinas Argentinas
Huracán Corrientes	Corrientes	José Antonio Romero Feris
Instituto	Córdoba	Presidente Perón
Olimpo	Bahía Blanca	Roberto Natalio Carminatti
San Martín	Mendoza	San Martín
San Martín	San Juan	Ing. Hilario Sánchez
San Martín	San Miguel de Tucumán	La Ciudadela
Talleres	Córdoba	Estadio La Boutique

=== Metropolitana Zone ===
Club	City	Stadium
All Boys	Floresta	Islas Malvinas
Almagro	José Ingenieros	Tres de Febrero
Almirante Brown	Isidro Casanova	Fragata Presidente Sarmiento
Arsenal	Sarandí	Julio H. Grondona
Atlanta	Villa Crespo	León Kolbovski
Banfield	Banfield	Florencio Solá
Central Córdoba	Rosario	Gabino Sosa
Chacarita Juniors	Villa Maipú	Chacarita Juniors
Defensa y Justicia	Florencio Varela	Norberto "Tito" Tomaghello
Deportivo Morón	Morón	Francisco Urbano
Estudiantes	Caseros	Ciudad de Caseros
Los Andes	Lomas de Zamora	Eduardo Gallardón
Nueva Chicago	Mataderos	Nueva Chicago
Quilmes	Quilmes	Centenario
San Miguel	Los Polvorines	Malvinas Argentinas
Sportivo Italiano	Ciudad Evita	Republica de Italia

== Interior Zone standings ==
Pos	Team	Pld	W	D	L	GF	GA	GD	Pts	Qualification
1	Instituto	30	17	7	6	38	22	+16	58	Championship Group
2	Belgrano	30	15	9	6	52	32	+20	54	Championship Group
3	Talleres (C)	30	13	12	5	38	22	+16	51	Championship Group
4	San Martín (SJ)	30	13	9	8	51	33	+18	48	Championship Group
5	San Martín (T)	30	13	8	9	49	43	+6	47	Championship Group
6	Almirante Brown (A)	30	12	9	9	44	34	+10	45	Championship Group
7	Atlético de Rafaela	30	12	9	9	45	38	+7	45	Championship Group
8	Atlético Tucumán	30	13	4	13	47	43	+4	43	Championship Group
9	Godoy Cruz	30	12	6	12	47	50	−3	42	Relegation Group
10	Aldosivi	30	8	12	10	45	50	−5	36	Relegation Group
11	Huracán Corrientes	30	9	8	13	41	57	−16	35	Relegation Group
12	Cipolletti	30	9	7	14	34	45	−11	34	Relegation Group
13	Chaco For Ever	30	6	12	12	39	52	−13	30	Relegation Group
14	Olimpo	30	6	11	13	32	46	−14	29	Relegation Group
15	San Martín (M)	30	7	7	16	29	44	−15	28	Relegation Group
16	Douglas Haig	30	5	10	15	32	52	−20	25	Relegation Group

== Metropolitana Zone standings ==
Pos	Team	Pld	W	D	L	GF	GA	GD	Pts	Qualification
1	Banfield	30	18	8	4	69	28	+41	62	Championship Group
2	Chacarita Juniors	30	13	10	7	44	32	+12	49	Championship Group
3	Los Andes	30	13	9	8	51	42	+9	48	Championship Group
4	Quilmes	30	13	9	8	41	32	+9	48	Championship Group
5	Central Córdoba (R)	30	14	6	10	38	30	+8	48	Championship Group
6	Arsenal	30	12	10	8	41	36	+5	46	Championship Group
7	All Boys	30	11	13	6	47	43	+4	46	Championship Group
8	Estudiantes (BA)	30	12	9	9	43	37	+6	45	Championship Group
9	San Miguel	30	12	9	9	33	27	+6	45	Relegation Group
10	Defensa y Justicia	30	12	6	12	46	35	+11	42	Relegation Group
11	Nueva Chicago	30	11	7	12	37	36	+1	40	Relegation Group
12	Sportivo Italiano	30	7	10	13	33	52	−19	31	Relegation Group
13	Deportivo Morón	30	7	9	14	36	56	−20	30	Relegation Group
14	Atlanta	30	5	12	13	33	46	−13	27	Relegation Group
15	Almagro	30	3	13	14	19	42	−23	22	Relegation Group
16	Almirante Brown	30	4	6	20	23	60	−37	18	Relegation Group

== Championship Group ==
It was divided in 2 groups with the 16 teams that qualified from Interior and Metropolitana Zone placed 1st to 8th and were mixed. The team placed 1st of each group qualified for the Promotion Playoff, and the teams placed 2nd and 3rd qualified for the Second Promotion Playoff.

=== Group A ===
Pos	Team	Pld	W	D	L	GF	GA	GD	Pts	Qualification
1	Talleres (C)	14	8	3	3	25	11	+14	27	Promotion Playoff
2	Quilmes	14	7	5	2	26	19	+7	26	Second Promotion; Playoff
3	Chacarita Juniors	14	6	4	4	20	16	+4	22	Second Promotion; Playoff
4	Instituto	14	6	3	5	19	18	+1	21	
5	Estudiantes (BA)	14	5	4	5	18	22	−4	19	
6	Los Andes	14	4	3	7	23	27	−4	15	
7	Atlético Tucumán	14	4	3	7	15	24	−9	15	
8	Almirante Brown (A)	14	2	3	9	13	22	−9	9	

=== Group B ===
Pos	Team	Pld	W	D	L	GF	GA	GD	Pts	Qualification
1	Belgrano	14	7	6	1	29	17	+12	27	Promotion Playoff
2	All Boys	14	8	3	3	24	16	+8	27	Second Promotion; Playoff
3	Banfield	14	7	5	2	24	14	+10	26	Second Promotion; Playoff
4	San Martín (SJ)	14	4	4	6	23	27	−4	16	
5	Central Córdoba (R)	14	5	1	8	12	16	−4	16	
6	San Martín (T)	14	3	6	5	20	23	−3	15	
7	Arsenal	14	2	6	6	27	36	−9	12	
8	Atlético de Rafaela	14	3	3	8	18	28	−10	12	

== Relegation Group ==
It was divided in 2 groups with the 16 teams that qualified from Interior and Metropolitana Zone placed 9th to 16th. The team placed 1st of each group qualified for the Second Promotion Playoff.

=== Interior Group ===
Pos	Team	Pld	W	D	L	GF	GA	GD	Pts	Qualification
1	Aldosivi	14	9	2	3	26	19	+7	29	Second Promotion Playoff
2	Cipolletti	14	7	4	3	24	14	+10	25	
3	San Martín (M)	14	6	6	2	23	13	+10	24	
4	Olimpo	14	7	3	4	26	18	+8	24	
5	Godoy Cruz	14	3	5	6	20	22	−2	14	
6	Chaco For Ever	14	4	2	8	20	28	−8	14	
7	Douglas Haig	14	3	4	7	14	27	−13	13	
8	Huracán Corrientes	14	3	2	9	18	30	−12	11	

=== Metropolitano Group ===
Pos	Team	Pld	W	D	L	GF	GA	GD	Pts	Qualification
1	Almagro	14	10	1	3	25	16	+9	31	Second Promotion Playoff
2	San Miguel	14	6	4	4	22	15	+7	22	
3	Sportivo Italiano	14	6	3	5	27	30	−3	21	
4	Deportivo Morón	14	6	2	6	21	18	+3	20	
5	Atlanta	14	6	2	6	17	16	+1	20	
6	Defensa y Justicia	14	6	1	7	22	20	+2	19	
7	Nueva Chicago	14	3	4	7	16	13	+3	13	
8	Almirante Brown	14	3	3	8	16	28	−12	12	

== Promotion playoff ==
The promotion playoff was played by the winner of Group A, Talleres (C) and the winner of Group B, Belgrano. The winning team was declared champion and was automatically promoted to Primera Division. The losing team joined in semifinals of the Second Promotion Playoff.

In the series, nicknamed the final of the century, Talleres 4–3 on penalties after both teams tied 2–2 on aggregate.

=== Match details ===
Championship playoff
1 Jul 1998
First leg

Talleres (C)	1–0	Belgrano (C)
Zelaya 84'

Estadio Olímpico, Córdoba
Attendance: 35,000
Referee: Daniel Giménez

5 Jul 1998
Second leg

Belgrano (C)	2–1 (a.e.t.) (3–4 p)	Talleres (C)
Carnero 79'; L. Sosa 90'	Report	Albornós 54'

Estadio Olímpico, Córdoba
Attendance: 35,000
Referee: Horacio Elizondo

Team details

Belgrano (C)
Talleres (C)

GK	1	Bernardo Ragg
DF	4	Cosme Zaccanti
DF	2	Diego Alarcón	Yellow card
DF	6	Hernán Medina		(substituted off) 58'
DF	3	Norberto Testa
MF	8	Horacio García		(substituted off) 58'
MF	5	Adrián Ávalos	Yellow card
MF	10	Hernán Manrique
MF	11	Guillermo Guendulain
FW	9	Luis E. Sosa (c)	Yellow card
FW	7	Cristian Carnero
Substitutes:
DF		Carlos Gómez		(substituted on) 58' (substituted off) 90'
FW	16	Luis F. Artime		(substituted on) 58'
DF		Cristian Binetti		(substituted on) 90'
Manager:
(Argentina) Ricardo Rezza

GK	1	Mario Cuenca
DF	4	David Díaz
DF	2	Horacio Humoller
DF	3	José M. Rozzi	Yellow card
MF	6	Andrés Cabrera
MF	5	Javier Villarreal	Yellow card
MF	11	Fernando Clementz
MF	8	Daniel Albornós		(substituted on) 82'
MF	10	Diego Garay		(substituted on) 74'
FW	9	José Zelaya		(substituted on) 86'
FW	7	Ramón Medina Bello
Substitutes:
FW	25	Rodrigo Astudillo		(substituted on) 74'
MF		Gustavo Lillo	Yellow card	(substituted on) 82'
FW		Roberto Oste		(substituted on) 86'
Manager:
(Argentina) Ricardo Gareca

Note: As the series had ended 2–2 on aggregate, Talleres won 4–3 on penalties, promoting to Primera División

== Second Promotion Playoff ==
The Second promotion playoff or Torneo Reducido was played by the teams placed 2nd and 3rd of each group of the Championship Group: Quilmes and Chacarita Juniors (Group A), All Boys and Banfield (Group B), and the teams placed 1st of each group of the Relegation Group: Aldosivi (Interior Group) and Almagro (Metropolitano Group). In the semifinals joined Belgrano, the losing team of the First Promotion Playoff. The winner was promoted to Primera Division.

=== First round ===
Team 1	Agg.	Team 2	1st leg	2nd leg
First Round
Quilmes	4-1	Almagro	2-1	2-0

Team 1	Agg.	Team 2	1st leg	2nd leg
First Round
All Boys	2-3	Aldosivi	0-1	2-2

Team 1	Agg.	Team 2	1st leg	2nd leg
First Round
Banfield	3-2	Chacarita Juniors	0-0	3-2

=== Semifinals ===
Team 1	Agg.	Team 2	1st leg	2nd leg
Semifinals
Quilmes	0-2	Aldosivi	0-0	0-2

Team 1	Agg.	Team 2	1st leg	2nd leg
Semifinals
Belgrano	3-2	Banfield	1-1	2-1

=== Final ===
Torneo Reducido Final
(2nd. promotion playoff)
15 Jul 1998
First leg

Aldosivi	1–1	Belgrano
Rizzo 11'		Zaccanti 16'

Estadio Mundialista, Mar del Plata
Referee: Daniel Giménez

19 Jul 1998
Second leg

Belgrano (C)	3–1	Aldosivi
Carnero 9'; Torres 85'; Sosa 90+2' (pen.)		Corti 87'

Estadio Olímpico, Córdoba
Referee: Oscar Sequeira

Team details

Belgrano (C)
Aldosivi

GK	Bernardo Ragg
DF	Cosme Zaccanti
DF	Diego Alarcón
DF	Jaime Garcete
DF	Norberto Testa
MF	Hernán Manrique
MF	Adrián Avalos
MF	Guillermo Guendulain
MF	Luis E. Sosa
FW	Luis F. Artime	(substituted off) 76'
FW	Cristian Carnero	(substituted off) 84'
Substitutions:
	Horacio García	(substituted on) 76'
	César L. Torres	(substituted on) 84'
Manager:
(Argentina) Ricardo Rezza

GK	Néstor Merlo
DF	Gustavo Garat
DF	Daniel Valdez
DF	Miguel A. Lizza	(substituted off) 71'
MF	Maximiliano Lucero	(substituted off) 64'
MF	Martín Ruiz
MF	Salvador Mónaco
MF	César G. Ortega	(substituted off) 52'
MF	César Serradell
FW	Pablo Corti
FW	Marcelo G. Ríos
Substitutions:
	Osvaldo Rizzo	(substituted on) 52'
	Adrián Hormaechea	(substituted on) 64'
	Juan R. Balmaceda	(substituted on) 71'
Manager:
(Argentina) Jorge Solari		Red card

Note: Belgrano won 4–1 on aggregate, promoting to Primera División.

== Relegation ==
Note: Clubs with indirect affiliation with AFA were relegated to the Torneo Argentino A, while clubs directly affiliated faced relegation to Primera B Metropolitana. Clubs with direct affiliation were all from Greater Buenos Aires, with the exception of Newell's, Rosario Central, Central Córdoba, and Argentino de Rosario, all from Rosario, and Unión and Colón from Santa Fe.

=== Interior Zone ===
Pos	Team	1995–96 Pts	1996–97 Pts	1997–98 Pts	Total Pts	Total Pld	Avg	Situation	Affiliation
1	Godoy Cruz	66	28	56	150	102	1.471		Indirect
2	Huracán Corrientes	75	—	46	121	86	1.407		Indirect
3	Aldosivi	—	17	65	82	60	1.367		Indirect
4	Olimpo	—	26	53	79	60	1.317		Indirect
5	Cipolletti	—	15	59	74	60	1.233		Indirect
6	San Martín (M)	—	—	52	52	44	1.182		Indirect
7	Douglas Haig	65	13	38	116	102	1.137	Relegation Playoff Matches	Indirect
8	Chaco For Ever	—	16	44	60	60	1	Relegation Playoff Matches	Indirect

=== Metropolitana Zone ===
Pos	Team	1995–96 Pts	1996–97 Pts	1997–98 Pts	Total Pts	Total Pld	Avg	Situation	Affiliation
1	San Miguel	—	—	67	67	44	1.523		Indirect
2	Defensa y Justicia	—	—	61	61	44	1.386		Indirect
3	Almagro	—	27	53	80	60	1.333		Indirect
4	Nueva Chicago	52	26	53	131	102	1.284		Indirect
5	Atlanta	55	22	47	124	102	1.216		Indirect
6	Deportivo Morón	43	27	50	120	102	1.176		Indirect
7	Sportivo Italiano	—	15	52	67	60	1.117	Relegated to Primera B Metropolitana	Indirect
8	Almirante Brown	—	14	30	44	60	0.733	Relegated to Primera B Metropolitana	Indirect

== Promotion/relegation playoff ==
Teams placed 7th and 8th of the Relegation Table Interior Zone (Douglas Haig and Chaco For Ever), played a promotion/relegation playoff or Torneo Reclasificatorio, with Huracán (SR) and Villa Mitre, teams from Torneo Argentino A. The winner was Douglas Haig and remained in the Primera B Nacional, while Huracán (SR) and Villa Mitre remained in Torneo Argentino A and Chaco For Ever was relegated to it.

=== Semifinals ===
Team 1	Score	Team 2
Douglas Haig	4-2	Villa Mitre

Team 1	Score	Team 2
Huracán (SR)	2-5	Chaco For Ever

=== Final ===
Team 1	Score	Team 2
Douglas Haig	4-3 (a.e.t.)	Chaco For Ever

Note: Chaco for Ever was relegated.

== See also ==
- 1997–98 in Argentine football
