= Nelson Cuevas =

Paraguayan footballer and singer (born 1980)

Personal information
- Full name: Nelson Rafael Cuevas Amarilla
- Date of birth: 10 January 1980 (age 46)
- Place of birth: Asunción, Paraguay
- Height: 1.72 m (5 ft 8 in)
- Position: Striker

Senior career*
Years	Team	Apps	(Gls)
1997	Sport Colombia		
1997–1998	Tembetary		
1998–2004	River Plate	74	(10)
2003	→ Shanghai COSCO Sanlin (loan)	24	(6)
2005–2006	Pachuca	47	(16)
2006–2007	Club América	23	(0)
2008	Libertad	8	(0)
2008	Santos	17	(2)
2009	Universidad de Chile	12	(2)
2009–2010	Olimpia Asunción	41	(12)
2010	Albacete	11	(1)
2011	Puebla	9	(0)
2011	Cerro Porteño	2	(0)
2012	Sportivo Luqueño	1	(0)
2012	Sportivo Carapeguá	7	(1)
Total		276	(50)

International career
1999	Paraguay U20		
2000	Paraguay U23		
1999–2007	Paraguay	41	(6)
- * Club domestic league appearances and goals

Nelson Rafael Cuevas Amarilla (Spanish pronunciation: [ˈnelson rafaˈel ˈkweβas amaˈɾiʎa]; born 10 January 1980) is a Paraguayan former footballer and current singer.

He represented the Paraguay national football team at the 2002 and 2006 FIFA World Cups and the 1999 and 2007 Copa América tournaments.

In addition to playing club football in his native Paraguay, Cuevas played for Santos in Brazil, River Plate in Argentina, Universidad de Chile in Chile, Albacete in Spain, Inter Shanghai in China, and three clubs in Mexico.

== Career ==
Born in Asunción, Paraguay, Cuevas started his career at Tembetary, a lower division club from Paraguay, before moving to River Plate of Argentina in 1998. He will forever be remembered by River fans for his memorable goals against Racing and Boca, the first resulting in River's championship win. In the 2004–05 season, he was transferred to Club América of Mexico, who loaned him out to Pachuca, where he was champion in the year 2006. He then returned to Club América.

Cuevas was released by Club América, and trained for brief period with Premier League club Portsmouth. Portsmouth and Blackburn Rovers were strongly linked to him, with the player stating that a move to England was a possibility. However, Cuevas would end up playing the first half of 2008 for Libertad in his native country and was later signed by Brazilian club Santos in July 2008. On 15 January 2009, he was released from his contract with Santos.

On 9 February, Cuevas signed a six-month deal with Universidad de Chile, one of the most popular teams in that country. On 7 July, he won the 2009 Apertura tournament with Universidad de Chile ending with 18 match played and 3 goals. At the end of the tournament, he announced that he will not renew with the Chilean club.

During the 2009 off-season, Cuevas had trials at Twente (making his debut in a friendly match played in the Netherlands, which ended in victory against Borussia Mönchengladbach) and Hannover 96. Cuevas did not finalize his contract with the aforementioned European clubs and returned to Paraguay to play for Olimpia Asunción, where he tried to return to the top form he once had during his River Plate years. On 16 December 2010, he signed with Mexican football club Puebla.

On 14 July 2011, Cuevas signed a contract with Cerro Porteño.

=== Deportivo Carapeguá ===
Cuevas scored his first goal for Deportivo Carapeguá in a 2–0 home victory against Club Libertad on 28 August 2012, Cuevas was substituted onto the field in the 69th minute and scored Carapeguá's second goal in the 88th minute.

== International career ==
Cuevas represented Paraguay U23 at the 2000 CONMEBOL Men Pre-Olympic Tournament.

Cuevas represented Paraguay at the 2002 World Cup, scoring two goals in Paraguay's final group match, a 3–1 win over Slovenia. Without the two goals, South Africa would have progressed to the second round at Paraguay's expense on goal difference. Cuevas was also in the National team in the Germany 2006 World Cup, and scored the second goal in the 2–0 Paraguay victory over Trinidad & Tobago after an assist by teammate Roque Santa Cruz. Despite the win, Paraguay failed to advance to the second round.

== Personal life ==
His mother, Nidia Amarilla, is also his manager, which is a rarity in the football world. He currently is married to Alicia Ramirez and the couple have one son: Enzo Rafael born in 2008.

== Singing career ==
In 2013, Cuevas became a singer, after retiring from football with knee injuries. While making success with music, Cuevas dreams of a comeback to sport.

== Honours ==
River Plate

- Apertura: 1999–2000
- Clausura: 1999–2000, 2001–2002, 2002–2003, 2003–2004

Pachuca

- Clausura: 2006

Club Libertad

- Apertura: 2008

Universidad de Chile

- Primera División de Chile: 2009 Apertura

== See also ==
- Players and Records in Paraguayan Football
