= Osvaldinho =

Osvaldinho or Oswaldinho may refer to:

- Osvaldinho (footballer, born 1937), Oswaldo Castilho Trindade, Brazilian midfielder
- Osvaldinho (footballer, born 1945), Firmino Baleizão da Graça Sardinha, Portuguese defender
- Oswaldinho (footballer, born 1904), Oswaldo Mello, Brazilian midfielder and forward
- Oswaldinho (footballer, born 1924), Oswaldo Buzzoni, Brazilian forward
