= Antonio Garabal =

Argentine footballer (born 1934)

Personal information
- Full name: Antonio Héctor Garabal Bogni
- Date of birth: 17 October 1934 (age 92)
- Place of birth: Buenos Aires, Argentina
- Height: 1.60 m (5 ft 3 in)
- Position: Forward

Youth career
- Universo (Boedo)

Senior career*
Years	Team	Apps	(Gls)
1953–1956	Ferro Carril Oeste		
1955	→ Boca Juniors (loan)	6	(1)
1957–1958	Atlético Madrid	11	(1)
1958	Deportivo Español		
1959	Ferro Carril Oeste		
1960	Boca Juniors		
1961–1965	Ferro Carril Oeste		
1966	San Lorenzo		

International career
1956	Argentina	2	(3)
- * Club domestic league appearances and goals

Antonio Héctor Garabal Bogni (born 17 October 1934), is an Argentine former professional footballer, who played as a forward.

== Club career ==
Garabal began his career playing for the amateur club Universo in the neighborhood of Boedo, Buenos Aires. In 1953 he turned professional for Ferro Carril Oeste, quickly becoming one of the club's main scorers, being loaned to Boca Juniors in 1955. He was acquired in 1957 by Atlético Madrid for m$n 1.5 million, and also later played for Deportivo Español, a second spell at Boca Juniors, and San Lorenzo, where he ended his career in 1966.

For Ferro Carril Oeste he made 196 appearances and scored 68 goals.

== International career ==
Garabal played two official matches for Argentina in 1956, in two friendlies against Uruguay where he scored three goals. He also competed in an unofficial competition against the Rio de Janeiro state football team, the Copa Raúl Colombo, again scoring a goal.

== Honours ==
Deportivo Español

- Primera D: 1958

Ferro Carril Oeste

- Primeira B: 1963

Argentina

- Copa Raúl Colombo: 1956
