= Trinidad de San Juan =

Argentine football club

Trinidad
- Full name: Club Atlético Trinidad
- Nickname(s): Los Leones
- Founded: 10 March 1980; 45 years ago
- Ground: El Templo
- Capacity: 15,000
- Manager: Juan Pagés
- League: Torneo Argentino B
- 2011–12: 7th of Zona 7 (not qualified)
| Home colours | Away colours |

Club Atlético Trinidad is an Argentine Football club based in San Juan, in the San Juan Province of Argentina. They currently play in Zone 5 of the regionalised 4th level of Argentine football Torneo Argentino B.

The club was founded in 1980 as a merger between Club Atlético Independiente (San Juan) and Club Atlético Los Andes. Los Andes had won the Liga Sanjuanina de futbol on 4 occasions and in 1977 qualified for the Nacional championship, finishing 4th in their group.
