= Gustavo Lillo =

Argentine footballer

Personal information
- Full name: Gustavo Alejandro Lillo
- Date of birth: August 8, 1973 (age 53)
- Place of birth: Mendoza, Argentina
- Height: 1.78 m (5 ft 10 in)
- Position: Defender

Senior career*
| Years | Team | Apps | (Gls) |
| 1994–1997 | Godoy Cruz | | |
| 1997–2002 | Talleres de Córdoba | | |
| 2002–2003 | FC Krylia Sovetov Samara | 31 | (0) |
| 2004 | Los Andes | | |
| 2004–2005 | Godoy Cruz | 30 | (1) |
| 2005 | San Martín de Mendoza | 6 | (0) |
- * Club domestic league appearances and goals

Gustavo Alejandro Lillo (born August 8, 1973, in Mendoza) is a retired Argentine professional footballer. He played 1 game in the UEFA Intertoto Cup 2002 for FC Krylia Sovetov Samara.

== Career ==
Lillo retired in December 2008 after playing for Guaymallén in the Argentinean Torneo Argentino B, the fourth division.

== Honours ==
- Russian Cup finalist: 2004 (played in the early stages of the 2003/04 tournament for FC Krylia Sovetov Samara).
