= Juan Pedevilla =

Argentine footballer (1909–?)

Personal information
- Full name: Juan Carlos Pedevilla
- Date of birth: 6 June 1909
- Place of birth: Argentina
- Height: 1.73 m (5 ft 8 in)
- Position: Defender

Senior career*
Years	Team	Apps	(Gls)
- Estudiantil Porteño

International career
1934	Argentina	1	(0)
- * Club domestic league appearances and goals

Juan Carlos Pedevilla (6 June 1909 – ?) was an Argentine football defender who played for Argentina in the 1934 FIFA World Cup. He also played for Club Atlético Estudiantil Porteño. Pedevilla is deceased.
