= Fabio Pieters =

Argentine footballer

Personal information
- Full name: Fabio Ariel Pieters
- Date of birth: June 3, 1978 (age 48)
- Place of birth: Rojas, Argentina
- Height: 1.73 m (5 ft 8 in)
- Position: Midfielder

Senior career*
Years	Team	Apps	(Gls)
1998–1999	Lanús	16	(0)
1999–2001	Los Andes	?	(?)
2001–2002	Estudiantes	27	(0)
2003–2004	Los Andes	?	(?)
2004	Defensores de Belgrano	?	(?)
2005	Hapoel Petah Tikva	15	(0)
2005–2009	Gimnasia de Jujuy	91	(3)
2009–2010	San Martín de Tucumán		
2010–2012	Talleres de Córdoba		
- * Club domestic league appearances and goals

Fabio Pieters (born 3 June 1978 in Rojas, Buenos Aires) is a former Argentine football midfielder.

Pieters started his professional playing career in 1998 with Lanús, in 2000 he joined Los Andes, he was part of the squad that obtained promotion to the Argentine Primera later that year.

Pieters joined Estudiantes in 2001 after Los Andes' relegation, but after making only 6 appearances for the Estudiantes he returned to Los Andes in 2003. He then had spells with Defensores de Belgrano and Israeli side Hapoel Petah Tikva before joining Gimnasia de Jujuy in 2005.
