= Sebastián Morquio =

Uruguayan footballer (born 1976)

Personal information
- Full name: Sebastián Darío Morquio Flores
- Date of birth: 22 January 1976 (age 50)
- Place of birth: Montevideo, Uruguay
- Height: 1.92 m (6 ft 4 in)
- Position: Defender

Youth career
- Nacional

Senior career*
Years	Team	Apps	(Gls)
1997–1999	Nacional	7	(0)
1999–2002	Huracán	120	(20)
2002	Montevideo Wanderers	0	(0)
2003	Uralan Elista	10	(0)
2003	Atlético Rafaela	0	(0)
2003	Alianza Lima	4	(0)
2004–2005	El Porvenir	32	(5)
2005	Universidad Católica (ECU)	11	(2)
2006	Aldosivi	23	(2)
2007–2008	Progreso	21	(2)
2008	San Martín Mendoza	5	(0)
2009	Curicó Unido	21	(1)
2010–2011	Deportivo Español	45	(6)
2011–2012	Deportivo Maipú	13	(1)
- * Club domestic league appearances and goals

Sebastián Darío Morquio Flores (born 22 January 1976) is a Uruguayan former footballer who played as a defender.

== Teams ==
- (Uruguay) Nacional 1997–1999
- (Argentina) Huracán 1999–2002
- (Uruguay) Montevideo Wanderers 2002
- (Russia) Uralan Elista 2003
- (Argentina) Atlético Rafaela 2003
- (Peru) Alianza Lima 2003
- (Argentina) El Porvenir 2004–2005
- (Ecuador) Universidad Católica 2005
- (Argentina) Aldosivi 2006
- (Uruguay) Progreso 2007–2008
- (Argentina) San Martín de Mendoza 2008
- (Chile) Curicó Unido 2009
- (Argentina) Deportivo Español 2010–2011
- (Argentina) Deportivo Maipú 2011–2012

== Post-retirement ==
Morquio has served as agent for players like Leonardo Burián.
