= Hugo Tedesco =

Argentine footballer

Personal information
- Full name: Hugo Ángel Tedesco
- Date of birth: 20 February 1947 (age 79)
- Place of birth: Argentina
- Position: Midfielder

Senior career*
Years	Team	Apps	(Gls)
1965–1971	Huracán		
1971–1976	Atlante		
1976	Estudiantes de La Plata		
1976	Temperley		
1975–1976	All Boys		

International career
1967	Argentina	1	(0)
- * Club domestic league appearances and goals

Hugo Ángel Tedesco (born 20 February 1947) is a former Argentine football midfielder.

== Career ==
Tedesco began playing football with Club Atlético Huracán, helping the club reach the 1969 Copa Argentina quarter-finals. In 1971, Bailetti moved abroad to play for Atlante F.C. in the Primera División de México for five seasons.

Tedesco returned to Argentina in 1976, finishing his career with Estudiantes de La Plata, Club Atlético Temperley and All Boys.

Tedesco made one appearance for the Argentina national football team, a friendly against Mexico in August 1967.
