= Mario Griguol =

Argentine footballer and coach

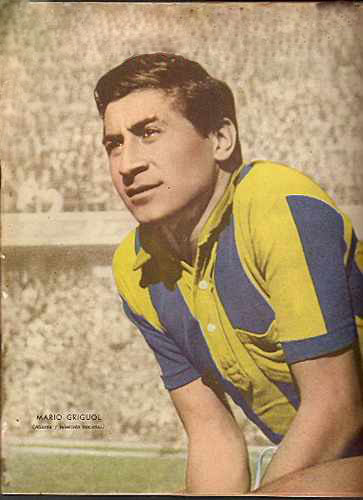
Griguol in 1961

Mario Griguol (born April 4, 1937, in Córdoba, Argentina) is an Argentine football coach and former player who played as a forward for clubs of Argentina and Chile.

== Teams ==
- Atlanta 1958–1961
- River Plate 1962–1963
- Ferro Carril Oeste 1964
- San Luis Quillota 1965–1967
- Santiago Wanderers 1968–1969

== Honours ==
Atlanta

- Sweden Cup: 1958

Santiago Wanderers

- Chilean Championship: 1968
