= Liga Sanjuanina de fútbol =

Liga Sanjuanina de futbol is a football league based in and around San Juan city in Argentina.

The most successful teams have traditionally been San Martin, Juventud Alianza and Desamparados, although none of these clubs have won the title since 1995.

As of August 2012 the league was headed by Alfredo Derito.

== Primera A teams ==
Trinidad de San Juan, Independiente de Villa Obrera, San Martín de San Juan, Del Bono de Rivadavia, Marquesado, Sportivo Desamparados, Union de Villa Krause, Juventud Alianza de San Juan, Arbol Verde de Concepción, Penarol de Chimbas, Colon Junior (San Juan), 9 de Julio.(Source:)

== Liga of champions ==
Season		Champion
1921		San Martín (SJ)
1922		Juventud Alianza
1923		Juventud Alianza
1924		San Martín (SJ)
1925		Juventud Alianza
1926		San Martín (SJ)
1927		Juan Graffigna
1928		Desamparados
1929		Juventud Alianza
1930		Juan Graffigna
1931		Juan Graffigna
1932		San Martín (SJ)
1933		Juan Graffigna
1934		Juventud Alianza
1935		Juventud Alianza
1936		Juventud Alianza
1937		San Martín (SJ)
1938		Juan Graffigna
1939		Los Andes
1940		San Martín (SJ)
1941		San Martín (SJ)
1942		Juan Graffigna
1943		San Martín (SJ)
1944		No tournament
1945		Juventud Alianza
1946		Juventud Alianza
1947		Sportivo Peñarol
1948		San Martín (SJ)
1949		Independiente
1950		Juventud Alianza
1951		San Martín (SJ)
1952		Juventud Alianza
1953		Juventud Alianza
1954		San Martín (SJ)
1955		San Martín (SJ)
1956		San Martín (SJ)
1957		San Martín (SJ)
1958		Los Andes
1959		Los Andes
1960		San Martín (SJ)
1961		Juventud Alianza
1962		Los Andes
1963		Desamparados
1964		San Martín (SJ)
1965		Sportivo Peñarol
1966		Desamparados
1967		San Martín (SJ)
1968		Desamparados
1969		San Martín (SJ)
1970		Desamparados
1971		Desamparados
1972		Desamparados
1973		Desamparados
1974		Juventud Alianza
1975		Desamparados
1976		Desamparados
1977		San Martín (SJ)
1978		Sportivo Peñarol
1979		Sportivo Peñarol
1980		San Martín (SJ)
1981		Juventud Alianza
1982		Juventud Alianza
1983		Desamparados
1984		Juventud Alianza
1985		Juventud Alianza
1986		Juventud Alianza
1987		Juventud Alianza
1988		Juventud Alianza
1989		San Martín (SJ)
1990		San Martín (SJ)
1991		Desamparados
1992		San Martín (SJ)
1993		Trinidad
1994		San Martín (SJ)
1995		San Martín (SJ)
1996		Unión (VK)
1997		Trinidad
1998		Unión (VK)
1999		Unión (VK)
2000		Trinidad
2001		Independiente de Villa Obrera
2002		Unión (VK)
2003		Unión (VK)
2004		Unión (VK)
2005		Del Bono
2006		Sportivo Peñarol
2007		Del Bono
2008		Independiente de Villa Obrera
2009		Trinidad
2010		Juventud Alianza
2011		9 de Julio
2012		San Martín (SJ)
2013		9 de Julio
2014		9 de Julio
2015		Independiente de Villa Obrera
2016	Invierno	Juventud Alianza
2016	Verano	Trinidad
2016	Anual	Juventud Alianza
2017	Invierno	Sportivo Peñarol
2017	Verano	Sportivo Peñarol
2017	Anual	Sportivo Peñarol
2018	Invierno	Desamparados
2018	Verano	Atenas
2018	Anual	Atenas
2019	Invierno	Atenas
2019	Verano	Colón Junior
2019	Anual	Atenas
2020		Canceled due to the COVID-19 pandemic
2021		Juventud Alianza
2022	Invierno	Unión (VK)
2022	Verano	San Lorenzo (U)
2022	Anual	San Lorenzo (U)
2023	Invierno	Colón Junior
2023	Verano	Juventud Alianza
2023	Anual	Colón Junior
2024	Invierno	Marquesado
2024	Verano	Atenas
2024	Anual	Atenas

== Total titles won by club ==
Club	Titles	Seasons won
San Martín (SJ)	26	1921, 1924, 1926, 1932, 1937, 1940, 1941, 1943, 1948, 1951, 1954, 1955, 1956, 1957, 1960, 1964, 1967, 1969, 1977, 1980, 1989, 1990, 1992, 1994, 1995, 2012
Juventud Alianza	24	1922, 1923, 1925, 1929, 1934, 1935, 1936, 1945, 1946, 1950, 1952, 1953, 1961, 1974, 1981, 1982, 1984, 1985, 1986, 1987, 1988, 2010, 2016 (A), 2021
Desamparados	12	1928, 1963, 1966, 1968, 1970, 1971, 1972, 1973, 1975, 1976, 1983, 1991
Colón Junior	7	1927, 1930, 1931, 1933, 1938, 1942, 2023 (A)
Unión (VK)	6	1996, 1998, 1999, 2002, 2003, 2004
Sportivo Peñarol	6	1947, 1965, 1978, 1979, 2006, 2017 (A)
Trinidad	4	1993, 1997, 2000, 2009
Los Andes	4	1939, 1958, 1959, 1962
Independiente de Villa Obrera	3	2001, 2008, 2015
9 de Julio	3	2011, 2013, 2014
Atenas	2	2018 (A), 2019 (A)
Del Bono	2	2005, 2007
Independiente	1	1949
San Lorenzo (U)	1	2022 (A)
