= Alfonso Lorenzo =

Argentine footballer

Personal information
- Full name: Alfonso Lorenzo
- Place of birth: Argentina
- Position: Midfielder

Senior career*
Years	Team	Apps	(Gls)
1925-1930	Barracas Central		
1931	Ferro Carril Oeste	3	(1)
1931	Quilmes		
1932-1938	Barracas Central	37	(27)

International career
1934	Argentina		
- * Club domestic league appearances and goals

Alfonso Lorenzo is an Argentinian football midfielder who played for Argentina in the 1934 FIFA World Cup. He also played for Barracas Central, Ferro Carril Oeste and Quilmes. Lorenzo is deceased.
