= Diego Garay =

Argentine footballer

Personal information
- Full name: Diego Héctor Garay
- Date of birth: 1 February 1975 (age 51)
- Place of birth: Argentina
- Position: Midfielder

Senior career*
Years	Team	Apps	(Gls)
-1995	Newell's Old Boys	37	(3)
1995-1999	Talleres de Córdoba		
1999-2000	RC Strasbourg Alsace	22	(4)
2001-2002	Talleres de Córdoba		
2002-2003	Querétaro F.C.		
2003	Barcelona S.C.		
2004	C.D. Irapuato		
2004-2006	Atlante F.C		
2006	Club León		
2007	Talleres de Córdoba		
2007-2008	Sportivo Belgrano	12	(2)
- * Club domestic league appearances and goals

Diego Garay (born 1 February 1975 in Argentina) is an Argentinean retired footballer.
