= 1999–2000 in Argentine football =

Football in Argentina
- Season: 1999–2000

The 1999–2000 season in Argentine football saw River Plate win both the league championships, while Boca Juniors won the Copa Libertadores 2000 and Talleres de Córdoba won the 1999 Copa CONMEBOL to become the first team from Córdoba Province to win a major international title.

== Torneo Apertura ("Opening" Tournament) ==
Position	Team	Points	Played	Won	Drawn	Lost	For	Against	Difference
1	River Plate	44	19	13	5	1	42	21	21
2	Rosario Central	43	19	14	1	4	34	18	16
3	Boca Juniors	41	19	12	5	2	36	15	21
4	San Lorenzo	33	19	10	6	3	30	15	15
5	Talleres de Córdoba	31	19	9	4	6	38	31	7
6	Racing Club	30	19	7	9	3	27	22	5
7	Vélez Sársfield	27	19	8	6	5	28	17	11
8	Chacarita Juniors	25	19	6	7	6	38	33	5
9	Independiente	25	19	6	7	6	19	21	-2
10	Estudiantes de La Plata	23	19	6	5	8	29	33	-4
11	Lanús	23	19	7	2	10	23	30	-7
12	Gimnasia de La Plata	21	19	4	9	6	28	28	0
13	Newell's Old Boys	21	19	5	6	8	27	27	0
14	Argentinos Juniors	21	19	4	9	6	20	22	-2
15	Unión de Santa Fe	21	19	5	6	8	24	30	-6
16	Instituto de Córdoba	19	19	5	7	7	23	30	-7
17	Colón de Santa Fe	19	19	5	4	10	20	28	-8
18	Belgrano de Córdoba	17	19	5	5	9	25	37	-12
19	Gimnasia de Jujuy	9	19	2	3	14	17	43	-26
20	Ferro Carril Oeste	9	19	1	6	12	14	44	-30

=== Top Scorers ===
Position	Player	Team	Goals
1	Javier Saviola	River Plate	15
2	Martín Palermo	Boca Juniors	14
3	Juan Antonio Pizzi	Rosario Central	12
4	Juan Pablo Ángel	River Plate	11

=== Relegation ===
There is no relegation after the Apertura. For the relegation results of this tournament see below

== Torneo Clausura ("Closing" Tournament) ==
Position	Team	Points	Played	Won	Drawn	Lost	For	Against	Difference
1	River Plate	42	19	12	6	1	44	17	27
2	Independiente	36	19	11	3	5	42	25	17
3	Colón de Santa Fe	36	19	11	3	5	27	15	12
4	San Lorenzo	36	19	11	3	5	27	15	12
5	Newell's Old Boys	34	19	10	4	5	32	21	11
6	Vélez Sársfield	34	19	9	7	3	28	18	10
7	Boca Juniors	33	19	10	6	3	38	17	21
8	Unión de Santa Fe	29	19	9	2	8	28	40	-12
9	Gimnasia de La Plata	28	19	8	4	7	28	33	-5
10	Talleres de Córdoba	27	19	7	6	6	21	22	-1
11	Club Atlético Lanús	25	19	8	4	7	32	22	10
12	Instituto de Córdoba	25	19	6	7	6	28	29	-1
13	Rosario Central	23	19	6	5	8	25	26	-1
14	Belgrano de Córdoba	22	19	6	4	9	28	31	-3
15	Chacarita Juniors	20	19	5	5	9	20	30	-10
16	Argentinos Juniors	18	19	4	6	9	21	36	-15
17	Estudiantes de La Plata	16	19	3	7	9	21	30	-9
18	Racing Club	15	19	3	6	10	22	29	-7
19	Gimnasia de Jujuy	10	19	2	4	13	15	34	-19
20	Ferro Carril Oeste	8	19	2	2	15	9	46	-37

=== Top Scorers ===
Position	Player	Team	Goals
1	Esteban Fuertes	Colón de Santa Fe	17
2	Bruno Marioni	Independiente	13
3	Daniel Jiménez	Instituto de Córdoba	12
4	Diego Klimowicz	Lanús	10

== Relegation ==
=== Relegation table ===
Team	Average	Points	Played	1997-98	1998-99	1999-2000
Boca Juniors	2.070	236	114	73	89	74
River Plate	1.921	219	114	74	58	86
San Lorenzo	1.684	192	114	62	61	69
Vélez Sársfield	1.623	185	114	78	46	61
Rosario Central	1.593	180	114	57	47	66
Gimnasia de La Plata	1.593	180	114	69	62	49
Independiente	1.474	168	114	56	51	61
Lanús	1.430	163	114	65	50	48
Talleres de Córdoba	1.342	102	76	N/A	44	58
Newell's Old Boys	1.307	149	114	42	52	55
Argentinos Juniors	1.272	145	114	57	49	39
Colón de Santa Fe	1.246	142	114	38	49	55
Racing Club	1.237	141	114	41	55	45
Unión de Santa Fe	1.202	137	114	33	54	50
Chacarita Juniors	1.184	45	38	N/A	N/A	45
Estudiantes La Plata	1.167	133	114	49	45	39
Instituto de Córdoba	1.158	44	38	N/A	N/A	44
Belgrano de Córdoba	1.092	83	76	N/A	44	39
Gimnasia de Jujuy	1.035	118	114	52	47	19
Ferro Carril Oeste	0.886	101	114	49	35	17

=== Relegation playoffs ===
Date	Home	Away	Result
July 20, 2000	Quilmes	Belgrano	3-1
July 23, 2000	Belgrano	Quilmes	3-1

The teams draw 4-4 therefore Belgrano stay in the Argentine First Division. Quilmes remains in Argentine Nacional B.

Date	Home	Away	Result
20 July 2000	Almagro	Instituto	1-0
23 July 2000	Instituto	Almagro	1-1

Almagro win 2–1 and are promoted to the Argentine First Division. Instituto are relegated to the Argentine Nacional B.

== Argentine clubs in international competitions ==
Team	CONMEBOL 1999	Copa Mercosur 1999	Copa Libertadores 2000
Boca Juniors	N/A	Group stage	Champions
Talleres de Córdoba	Champions	did not qualify	did not qualify
San Lorenzo	1st round	SF	Group stage
River Plate	N/A	Group stage	QF
Independiente	N/A	QF	did not qualify
Rosario Central	1st round	did not qualify	2nd round
Racing Club	N/A	Group stage	did not qualify
Vélez Sársfield	N/A	Group stage	did not qualify

== National team ==
This section covers the Argentina national team's matches from August 1, 1999, to July 31, 2000.

Win Draw Loss

=== Friendly matches ===
September 4, 1999	Argentina	2 – 0	Brazil	Buenos Aires, Argentina
	Verón 29'; Crespo 57'	(Report)		Stadium: Estadio Antonio V. Liberti; Attendance: 50,000; Referee: Gustavo Méndez (Uruguay)

September 7, 1999	Brazil	4 – 2	Argentina	Porto Alegre, Brazil
	Rivaldo 41', 42', 70'; Ronaldo 82'	(Report)	Ayala 45'; Ortega 88'	Stadium: Estádio Beira-Rio; Attendance: 49,500; Referee: Óscar Ruiz (Colombia)

October 13, 1999	Argentina	2 – 1	Colombia	Córdoba, Argentina
	Batistuta 7'; Ortega 70'	(Report)	Córdoba 47'	Stadium: Estadio Chateau Carreras; Attendance: 42,000

November 17, 1999	Spain	0 – 2	Argentina	Seville, Spain
		(Report)	González 63'; Pochettino 77'	Stadium: Ramón Sánchez Pizjuán Stadium; Attendance: 65,000; Referee: Georgios Psychomanis (Greece)

February 23, 2000	England	0 – 0	Argentina	London, England
		(Report)		Stadium: Wembley Stadium; Attendance: 74,008; Referee: Markus Merk (Germany)

=== 2002 World Cup qualifiers ===
March 29, 2000 Round 1	Argentina	4 – 1	Chile	Buenos Aires, Argentina
21:30	Batistuta 9'; Verón 33', 71' (pen.); C. López 87'	(Report)	Tello 29'	Stadium: Estadio Antonio V. Liberti; Attendance: 46,374; Referee: Byron Moreno (Ecuador)

April 26, 2000 Round 2	Venezuela	0 – 4	Argentina	Maracaibo, Venezuela
19:00		(Report)	Ayala 8'; Ortega 24', 77'; Crespo 89'	Stadium: Estadio José Pachencho Romero; Attendance: 19,355; Referee: Carlos Amarilla (Paraguay)

June 4, 2000 Round 3	Argentina	1 – 0	Bolivia	Buenos Aires, Argentina
15:00	G. López 83'	(Report)		Stadium: Estadio Antonio V. Liberti; Attendance: 50,669; Referee: Márcio Rezende de Freitas (Brazil)

June 29, 2000 Round 4	Colombia	1 – 3	Argentina	Bogotá, Colombia
20:30	Oviedo 26'	(Report)	Batistuta 23', 44'; Crespo 75'	Stadium: Estadio El Campín; Attendance: 43,246; Referee: Jorge Larrionda (Uruguay)

July 19, 2000 Round 5	Argentina	2 – 0	Ecuador	Buenos Aires, Argentina
21:00	Crespo 29'; C. López 49'	(Report)		Stadium: Estadio Antonio V. Liberti; Attendance: 44,199; Referee: Daniel Bello (Uruguay)

July 26, 2000 Round 6	Brazil	3 – 1	Argentina	São Paulo, Brazil
21:40	Alex 5'; Vampeta 45', 50'	(Report)	Almeyda 45+1'	Stadium: Estadio do Morumbi; Attendance: 80,000; Referee: Gustavo Méndez (Uruguay)
