= Estadio José Martín Olaeta =

Football stadium in Rosario, Argentina

José Martín Olaeta Stadium
- Estadio José Martín Olaeta
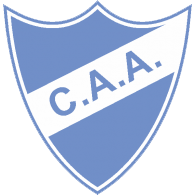
- Interactive map of José Martín Olaeta Stadium
- Address: Víctor Mercante 750; Rosario, Santa Fe; Argentina
- Coordinates: 32.9075°S 60.6837°W
- Owner: C.A. Argentino
- Capacity: 8,000
- Type: Stadium
- Surface: Grass

Construction
- Opened: April 15, 1944; 82 years ago

Tenant
- Argentino (1944–present)

Estadio José Martín Olaeta is a football stadium located in the city of Rosario of Santa Fe Province, Argentina. The stadium is owned and operated by C.A. Argentino. It has a capacity of 8,500 spectators and was inaugurated in 1944.

The stadium was named after José Martín Olaeta, president of the club what promoted Argentino's affiliation to Argentine Football Association (AFA) in 1944, as part of being behind the construction of the venue. It has two grandstands, one cement-built and another wooden-built. Olaeta is regarded as the most important executive in club's history.

It was declared "City of Rosario Heritage Site" in 2012. The statement said "the stadium's heritage value is not its architectural style but what this means for its neighbors and club members".

== History ==
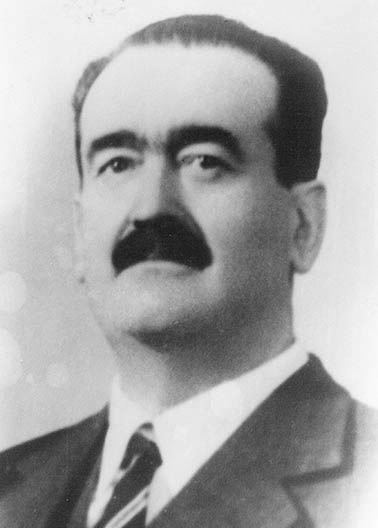
José Martín Olaeta, president of the club that promoted the affiliation to AFA

The first Club Argentino stadium was located on Boulevard Avellaneda and Gorriti streets, in Barrio Refinería, then moving to Gorriti and Iguazú street in Barrio Industrial. When the institution requested affiliation to AFA in 1943, the observers requested the club to build a grandstand to fulfil the AFA's regulations for official competitions. Club executives decided to buy one of the boundaries lands to make the refurbishments requested. As the land's owner refused to sell his property, Olaeta (then president of the club) decided to acquire a land in the north side of the city, on Víctor Mercante street, where the stadium was finally built, and affiliation was accepted by the AFA.

Club Atlético Argentino made their debut in tournaments organised by AFA in the 1944 Torneo de Ascenso (then the second division of Argentine football) playing its first match vs All Boys, on 15 April 1944, which was also the first match held in Estadio Olaeta.
