= 1997–98 in Argentine football =

Football in Argentina
- Season: 1997–98

In 1997–98 season in Argentine football River Plate won the Apertura 1997 and Vélez Sársfield won the Clausura 1998.

== Torneo Apertura ("Opening" Tournament) ==
Position	Team	Points	Played	Won	Drawn	Lost	For	Against	Difference
1	River Plate	45	19	14	3	2	43	17	26
2	Boca Juniors	44	19	13	5	1	35	12	23
3	Rosario Central	35	19	10	5	4	35	20	15
4	Vélez Sársfield	32	19	8	8	3	42	23	19
5	San Lorenzo	32	19	9	5	5	42	32	10
6	Gimnasia La Plata	32	19	9	5	5	33	27	6
7	Independiente	30	19	9	3	7	29	31	-2
8	Argentinos Juniors	29	19	9	2	8	24	25	-1
9	Platense	28	19	7	7	5	25	26	-1
10	Estudiantes de La Plata	26	19	7	5	7	25	24	1
11	Lanús	25	19	7	4	8	29	30	-1
12	Ferro Carril Oeste	24	19	6	6	7	33	32	1
13	Racing Club	21	19	5	6	8	24	28	-4
14	Gimnasia de Jujuy	20	19	5	5	9	25	28	-3
15	Colón de Santa Fe	20	19	5	5	9	23	33	-10
16	Unión de Santa Fe	20	19	5	5	9	25	43	-19
17	Deportivo Español	17	19	4	5	10	26	43	-17
18	Newell's Old Boys	14	19	3	5	11	22	38	-16
19	Huracán	12	19	3	3	13	20	32	-12
20	Gimnasia y Tiro	12	19	2	6	11	14	30	-16

=== Top scorers ===
Position	Player	Team	Goals
1	Rubén Da Silva	Rosario Central	15
2	Washington Abreu	San Lorenzo	13
3	Patricio Camps	Vélez Sársfield	12
3	Roberto Sosa	Gimnasia La Plata	12

== Torneo Clausura ("Closing" Tournament) ==
Position	Team	Points	Played	Won	Drawn	Lost	For	Against	Difference
1	Vélez Sársfield	46	19	14	4	1	39	14	25
2	Lanús	40	19	11	7	1	43	22	19
3	Gimnasia La Plata	37	19	11	4	4	42	24	18
4	Gimnasia de Jujuy	32	19	9	5	5	23	20	3
5	San Lorenzo	30	19	9	3	7	36	27	9
6	Boca Juniors	29	19	8	5	6	38	30	8
7	River Plate	29	19	7	8	4	32	24	8
8	Argentinos Juniors	28	19	7	7	5	26	17	9
9	Newell's Old Boys	28	19	7	7	5	26	22	4
10	Ferro Carril Oeste	25	19	6	7	6	32	34	-2
11	Independiente	23	19	6	5	8	26	28	-2
12	Estudiantes de La Plata	23	19	6	5	8	16	24	-8
13	Rosario Central	22	19	5	7	7	23	28	-5
14	Platense	21	19	4	9	6	26	27	-1
15	Racing Club	20	19	5	5	9	15	19	-4
16	Colón de Santa Fe	18	19	4	6	9	23	36	-13
17	Gimnasia y Tiro	16	19	4	4	11	17	34	-17
18	Huracán	15	19	3	6	10	18	34	-16
19	Unión de Santa Fe	13	19	2	7	10	19	33	-14
20	Deportivo Español	13	19	2	7	10	21	44	-23

=== Top scorers ===
Position	Player	Team	Goals
1	Roberto Sosa	Gimnasia La Plata	17
2	Gustavo Bartelt	Lanús	13
3	Martín Palermo	Boca Juniors	12
4	Patricio Camps	Vélez Sársfield	10
4	Martín Posse	Vélez Sársfield	10

== Relegation ==
Gimnasia y Tiro de Salta and Deportivo Español were relegated with the worst points averages.

== Argentine clubs in international competitions ==
Team	Recopa 1997	Supercopa 1997	CONMEBOL 1997	Copa Libertadores 1998
River Plate	Runner up	Champions	N/A	SF
Lanús	N/A	N/A	Runner up	did not qualify
Colón de Santa Fe	N/A	N/A	SF	QF
Boca Juniors	N/A	Group stage	did not qualify	did not qualify
Estudiantes	N/A	Group stage	did not qualify	did not qualify
Independiente	N/A	Group stage	did not qualify	did not qualify
Racing Club	N/A	Group stage	did not qualify	did not qualify
Vélez Sársfield	N/A	Group stage	did not qualify	did not qualify
