= Estadio Roberto Natalio Carminatti =

Football stadium in Bahía Blanca, Argentina

Roberto Carminatti Stadium
- Estadio Roberto Carminatti
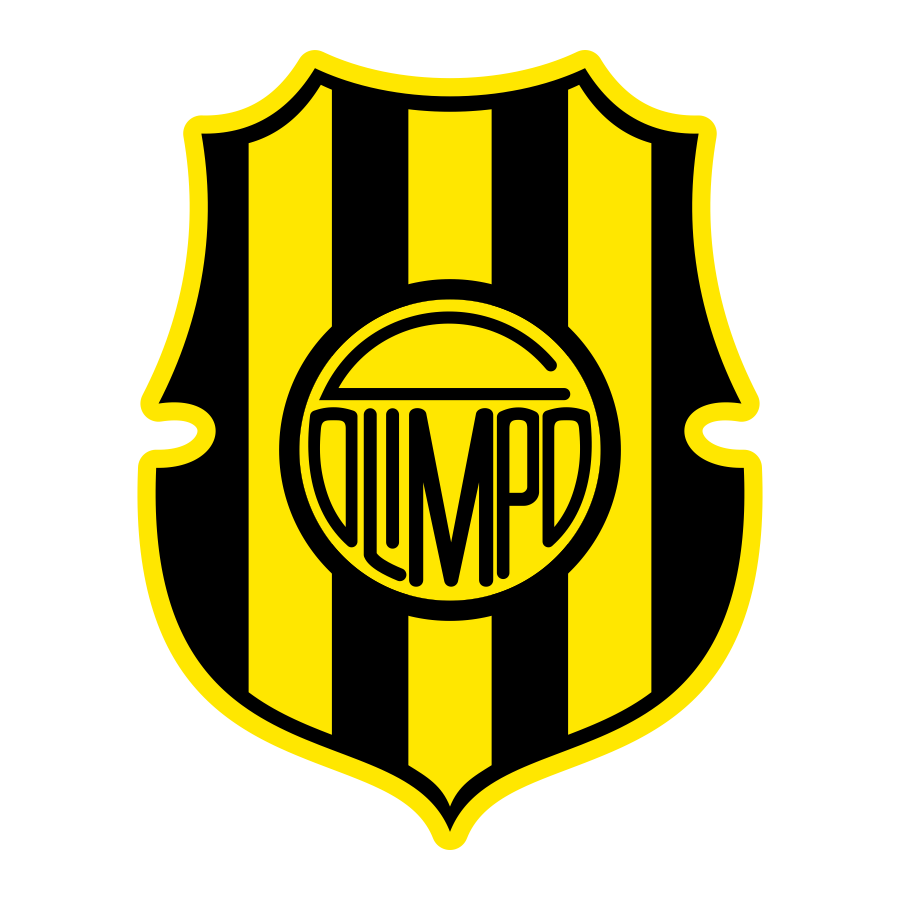

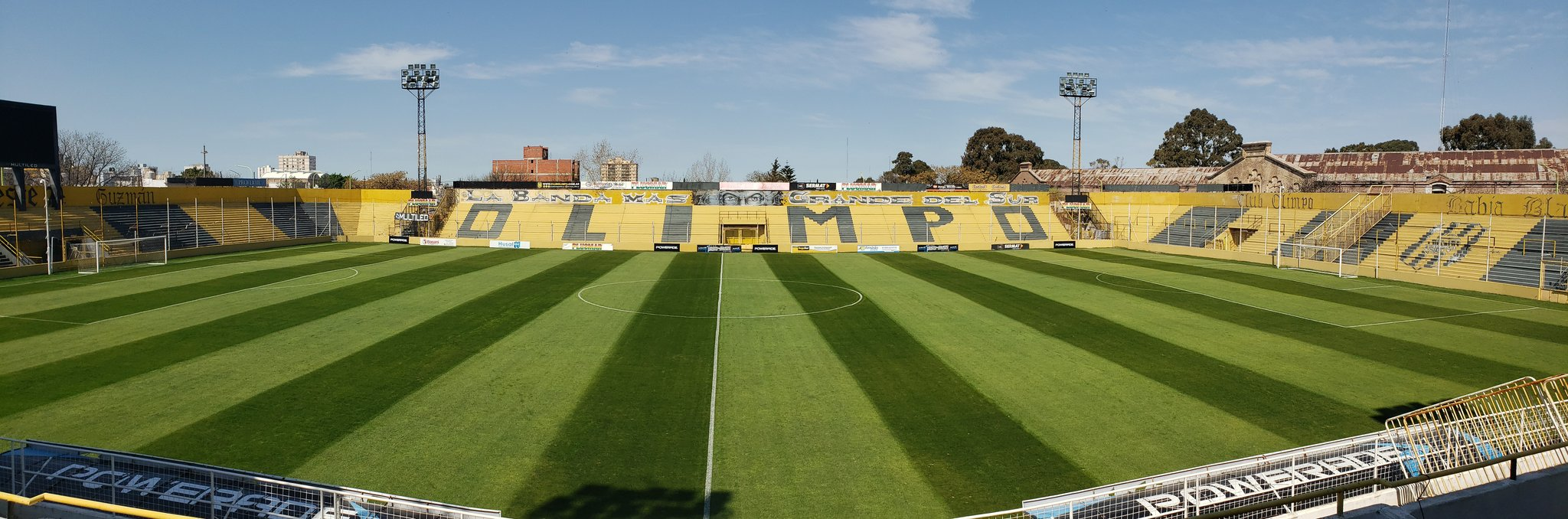
- The stadium in 2021
- Interactive map of Roberto Carminatti Stadium
- Full name: Estadio Roberto Natalio Carminatti
- Address: Ángel Brunel 11; Bahía Blanca; Argentina
- Owner: Club Olimpo
- Capacity: 18,000
- Type: Stadium
- Surface: Grass
- Scoreboard: LED
- Field size: 94,5 x 69 m

Construction
- Opened: January 22, 1942; 84 years ago
- Renovated: 1977, 2003

Tenant
- Club Olimpo (1942–present)

Estadio Roberto Natalio Carminatti is a football stadium located in the city of Bahía Blanca of Buenos Aires Province, Argentina. The stadium is owned and operated by Club Olimpo. The stadium has a capacity of 18,000 spectators and was inaugurated in 1942.

The venue was named after Roberto Carminatti (1884–1974), president of the club during the years the stadium was built and inaugurated. Carminatti had worked at the club from his early age, becoming president of the institution in 1923. His tenure on the club lasted until 1945. Although he was retired, Carminatti would be elected for a second presidency of Club Olimpo in 1963. The stadium was given the name in 1975.

== History ==
The stadium was inaugurated on 22 January 1942 in a friendly match between a regional "Liga del Sur" combined and Banfield, which won 6–4.

The stadium was completely refurbished in 1977, when the fencing surrounding the pitch was replaced by walls and concrete columns. In 1995 the first concrete grandstand was built on the Angel Brunel street side. Nevertheless the most modifications came when Olimpo promoted to Primera División after winning the 2001–02 Primera B Nacional championship. The club replaced all the wooden stands for concrete-made ones, adding seat stalls to increase the stadium's capacity to 12,000 spectators. Besides, the lighting system was modernised, as well as the press booths, ticket boxes, and toilettes. Works had a cost of AR$680,000. Those refurbishments were demanded by the Argentine Football Association. In 2013, a LED screen was added to the stadium. It was put into operation in a match vs Boca Juniors

Other improvements included the installation of a irrigation system. Works were carried out by a company that had previously worked on River Plate and San Lorenzo stadiums.

== Events ==
As part of their preparation for the 1978 FIFA World Cup, the Argentina national team coached by César Menotti played a friendly match at Estadio Roberto Carminatti vs the Liga del Sur combined team (the national team won 7–0).

Argentina's starting line up included prominent players such as Ubaldo Fillol, Norberto Alonso, Daniel Bertoni, and Mario Kempes. Diego Maradona (who was only 17 years old) replaced Kempes in the second half, playing 10 minutes. As it was the first time Maradona came to Bahía Blanca and Roberto Carminatti stadium, in May 2021 a group of supporters painted a mural on one of the stadium's walls to commemorate that historic moment.

== See also ==
- List of football stadiums in Argentina
- Lists of stadiums
