= Osvaldinho (footballer, born 1937) =

Brazilian footballer

Personal information
- Full name: Oswaldo Castilho Trindade
- Date of birth: 30 August 1937
- Place of birth: Uruguaiana, Brazil
- Date of death: 19 July 2012 (aged 74)
- Place of death: Uruguaiana, Brazil
- Position: Midfielder

Youth career
- –1953: Ferro Carril

Senior career*
Years	Team	Apps	(Gls)
1954–1957	Sá Viana		
1958–1962	Internacional		
1963–1964	São Paulo	16	(1)
1965–1966	XV de Piracicaba		
1966	America-RJ		
1967–1968	Flamengo-RS		
1969	Metropol-SC		
1970	Flamengo-RS		
- * Club domestic league appearances and goals as of 23 November 2023

Oswaldo Castilho Trindade (30 August 1937 – 19 July 2012), better known as Osvaldinho, was a Brazilian professional footballer who played as a midfielder.

== Career ==
Born in Uruguaiana, Osvaldinho played for the city's clubs until joining SC Internacional in 1958. He was considered the great hero of the 1961 Rio Grande do Sul title, the only state championship won by Internacional from 1955 to 1968. At São Paulo FC, he played for just two seasons, making 16 appearances and scoring one goal. He would still play for XV de Piracicaba, America-RJ, Metropol de Criciúma and Flamengo de Caxias do Sul (current SER Caxias).

== Honours ==
Internacional

- Campeonato Gaúcho: 1961

== Death ==
Osvaldinho died at the age of 74 in Uruguaiana, due to complications from a neurological disease.
