= 2024 Primera C Metropolitana =

Primera C Metropolitana
- Dates: 2 Feb – 14 Dec 2024
- Champions: Real Pilar (1st title)
- Promoted: Real Pilar
- Relegated: (none)
- 2025 Copa Argentina: Real Pilar; General Lamadrid; Berazategui; Deportivo Español; Central Córdoba (R)
- Matches: 602
- Goals: 1,040 (1.73 per match)

The 2024 Argentine Primera C Metropolitana was the 124th season of Primera C Metropolitana, the third division of football in Argentina. The season began on 2 February and scheduled to end in November 2024. Twenty-four teams competed in the league.

Real Pilar won their first title (and also promoted to the upper division) after defeating General Lamadrid in the finals, 4–0 on aggregate.

== Format ==
Primera C is currently organised into two league tournaments, the Apertura (opening) and the Clausura (closing). Each team plays every other team once in the Apertura, and then once again at the reverse venue in the Clausura.

The winners of the two league titles were recognised as champions. However, the overall championship was decided with an end of season playoff. The overall champion was promoted to Primera B Metropolitana.

The team that finished with the worst aggregate points total was disaffiliated for next season, with no relegated teams.

== Teams ==
Club	City	Area / region	Stadium
Argentino	Rosario	Santa Fe Province	José María Olaeta
Atlas	General Rodríguez	Buenos Aires	Ricardo Puga
Berazategui	Berazategui	Buenos Aires	Norman Lee
Central Ballester	José L. Suárez	Greater Buenos Aires	Predio Cacique
Central Córdoba	Rosario	Santa Fe	Gabino Sosa
Centro Español	Villa Sarmiento	Greater Buenos Aires	(none)
Claypole	Claypole	Buenos Aires	Rodolfo Capocasa
Defensores de Cambaceres	Ensenada	Buenos Aires Province	Defensores de Cambaceres
Deportivo Español	Buenos Aires City	Buenos Aires	Nueva España
Deportivo Paraguayo	Constitución	Buenos Aires City	(none)
El Porvenir	Gerli	Greater Buenos Aires	Estadio Gildo Francisco Ghersinich
General Lamadrid	Buenos Aires City	Buenos Aires	Enrique Sexto
Justo José de Urquiza	El Libertador	Buenos Aires	Ramón Roque Martín
Juventud Unida	Muñiz	Greater Buenos Aires	Ciudad de San Miguel
Leandro N. Alem	General Rodríguez	Buenos Aires	Leandro N. Alem
Lugano	Tapiales	Greater Buenos Aires	José María Moraños
Luján	Luján	Buenos Aires	Municipal de Luján
Mercedes	Mercedes	Buenos Aires Province	Liga Mercedina,
Muñiz	Muñiz	Greater Buenos Aires	(none)
Puerto Nuevo	Campana	Buenos Aires	Rubén Vallejos
Real Pilar	Pilar	Buenos Aires	Carlos Barraza
Sportivo Barracas	Barracas, Buenos Aires	Buenos Aires City	(none)
Victoriano Arenas	Valentin Alsina	Buenos Aires	Saturnino Moure
Yupanqui	Buenos Aires City	Buenos Aires	Ciudad Evita

== Regular season ==
=== Apertura ===
Pos	Team	Pld	W	D	L	GF	GA	GD	Pts	Promotion or Qualification
1	General Lamadrid	24	14	7	3	36	16	+20	49	Qualification to Championship Finals
2	Berazategui	24	14	7	3	43	25	+18	49	
3	Argentino de Rosario	24	11	9	4	39	22	+17	42	
4	Central Córdoba	24	11	9	4	31	20	+11	42	
5	JJ Urquiza	24	12	4	8	37	21	+16	40	
6	Claypole	24	11	6	7	31	28	+3	39	
7	Deportivo Español	24	8	13	3	26	17	+9	37	
8	Atlas	24	10	6	8	37	35	+2	36	
9	Luján	24	10	6	8	26	24	+2	36	
10	Real Pilar	24	7	12	5	37	28	+9	33	
11	Ituzaingó	24	8	9	7	21	16	+5	33	
12	Muñiz	24	10	3	11	35	38	−3	33	
13	Cambaceres	24	7	11	6	21	23	−2	32	
14	Leandro N. Alem	24	8	8	8	26	30	−4	32	
15	Yupanqui	24	8	7	9	21	22	−1	31	
16	Central Ballester	24	7	10	7	19	23	−4	31	
17	Centro Español	24	9	3	12	30	30	0	30	
18	El Porvenir	24	8	6	10	27	30	−3	30	
19	Mercedes	24	6	9	9	18	29	−11	27	
20	Victoriano Arenas	24	5	11	8	20	23	−3	26	
21	Puerto Nuevo	24	5	9	10	25	33	−8	24	
22	Sportivo Barracas	24	5	8	11	21	35	−14	23	
23	Deportivo Paraguayo	24	5	5	14	13	29	−16	20	
24	Lugano	24	3	6	15	15	37	−22	15	
25	Juventud Unida	24	2	8	14	11	32	−21	14	

Source: Soccerway
Rules for classification: 1) points; 2) goal difference; 3) goals scored; 4) head-to-head points; 5) head-to-head goal difference; 6) head-to-head goals scored.

=== Clausura ===
Pos	Team	Pld	W	D	L	GF	GA	GD	Pts	Promotion or Qualification
1	Real Pilar (Q)	24	16	8	0	35	6	+29	56	Qualification to Championship Finals
2	Deportivo Español	24	14	6	4	35	17	+18	48	
3	General Lamadrid	24	13	5	6	45	23	+22	44	Apertura winners, assured of Championship Finals
4	Berazategui	24	13	4	7	32	22	+10	43	
5	Ituzaingó	24	10	10	4	29	17	+12	40	
6	Leandro N. Alem	24	9	11	4	30	15	+15	38	
7	Central Córdoba	24	10	6	8	28	25	+3	36	
8	JJ Urquiza	24	10	6	8	21	19	+2	36	
9	Centro Español	24	10	4	10	26	23	+3	34	
10	Luján	24	10	4	10	28	31	−3	34	
11	Claypole	24	9	6	9	32	20	+12	33	
12	Victoriano Arenas	24	8	8	8	21	25	−4	32	
13	Juventud Unida	24	9	5	10	25	30	−5	32	
14	Muñiz	24	9	5	10	26	33	−7	32	
15	Sportivo Barracas	24	9	5	10	22	29	−7	32	
16	Puerto Nuevo	24	7	10	7	22	25	−3	31	
17	Central Ballester	24	8	6	10	23	32	−9	30	
18	El Porvenir	24	6	11	7	13	14	−1	29	
19	Atlas	24	7	6	11	22	29	−7	27	
20	Lugano	24	6	8	10	24	38	−14	26	
21	Cambaceres	24	4	11	9	11	20	−9	23	
22	Yupanqui	24	6	5	13	21	41	−20	23	
23	Argentino de Rosario	24	5	7	12	26	29	−3	22	
24	Mercedes	24	4	7	13	13	28	−15	19	
25	Deportivo Paraguayo	24	2	8	14	18	37	−19	14	

Updated to match(es) played on 21 November 2024. Source: Soccerway
Rules for classification: 1) points; 2) goal difference; 3) goals scored; 4) head-to-head points; 5) head-to-head goal difference; 6) head-to-head goals scored.
(Q) Qualified for the phase indicated

== Aggregate table ==
Pos	Team	Pld	W	D	L	GF	GA	GD	Pts	Promotion or Qualification
1	General Lamadrid	48	27	12	9	81	39	+42	93	Advance to Championship Finals and qualification for Copa Argentina
2	Berazategui	48	27	11	10	75	47	+28	92	Qualification for Copa Argentina
3	Real Pilar	48	23	20	5	72	34	+38	89	Advance to Championship Finals and qualification for Copa Argentina
4	Deportivo Español	48	22	19	7	61	34	+27	85	Qualification for Copa Argentina
5	Central Córdoba	48	21	15	12	59	45	+14	78	Qualification for Copa Argentina
6	JJ Urquiza	48	22	10	16	58	40	+18	76	
7	Ituzaingó	48	18	19	11	50	33	+17	73	
8	Claypole	48	20	12	16	63	48	+15	72	
9	Leandro N. Alem	48	17	19	12	56	45	+11	70	
10	Luján	48	20	10	18	54	55	−1	70	
11	Muñiz	48	19	8	21	61	71	−10	65	
12	Argentino de Rosario	48	16	16	16	65	51	+14	64	
13	Centro Español	48	19	7	22	56	53	+3	64	
14	Atlas	48	17	12	19	59	64	−5	63	
15	Central Ballester	48	15	16	17	42	55	−13	61	
16	El Porvenir	48	14	17	17	40	44	−4	59	
17	Victoriano Arenas	48	13	19	16	41	48	−7	58	
18	Puerto Nuevo	48	12	19	17	47	58	−11	55	
19	Cambaceres	48	11	22	15	32	43	−11	55	
20	Sportivo Barracas	48	14	13	21	43	64	−21	55	
21	Yupanqui	48	14	12	22	42	63	−21	54	
22	Juventud Unida	48	11	13	24	36	62	−26	46	
23	Mercedes	48	10	16	22	31	57	−26	46	
24	Lugano	48	9	14	25	39	75	−36	41	
25	Deportivo Paraguayo	48	7	13	28	31	66	−35	34	Disaffiliation for next season canceled

Updated to match(es) played on 21 November 2024. Source: Soccerway
Rules for classification: 1) points; 2) goal difference; 3) goals scored; 4) head-to-head points; 5) head-to-head goal difference; 6) head-to-head goals scored.

== Championship Finals ==
The winners of the Apertura (General Lamadrid) and Clausura (Real Pilar) play a two-legged series to decide the champions and the first team promoted to Primera B Metropolitana.

=== First leg ===
7 December 2024
15:45 UTC−3

Real Pilar	2–0	General Lamadrid
Crocco 61'; Rodríguez 75'	Report

Estadio Municipal Carlos Barraza, Pilar
Attendance: 1,500
Referee: Alejandro Porticella

=== Second leg ===
14 December 2024
19:00 UTC−3

General Lamadrid	0–2	Real Pilar
	Report	Rodríguez 2'; Leguiza 82'

Estadio Enrique Sexto, Villa Devoto
Attendance: 3,000
Referee: Guido Mascheroni

Team details

General Lamadrid
Real Pilar

GK	(Argentina) Néstor F. Acosta	Yellow card
DF	(Argentina) Juan Pablo López	Yellow card
DF	(Spain) Emir Ham	Yellow card	(substituted off) 46'
DF	(Argentina) Lautaro Guzmán
DF	(Argentina) Martin Sarandeses	Yellow card
MF	(Argentina) Antonio Paulides	Yellow card
MF	(Argentina) Santiago Apa		(substituted off) 68'
MF	(Argentina) Juan J. Puppi		(substituted off) 46'
MF	(Argentina) Claudio Campostrini	Yellow card
FW	(Argentina) Matías Ruiz		(substituted off) 46'
FW	(Argentina) Nahuel Paz		(substituted off) 46'
Substitutions:
MF	(Argentina) Juan Arana	Yellow card	(substituted on) 46'
MF	(Argentina) Lucas Cuevas		(substituted on) 46'
FW	(Argentina) Ian Lynch		(substituted on) 46'
FW	(Argentina) Matías Bilbao		(substituted on) 46'
FW	(Argentina) Rodrigo Monserrat		(substituted on) 68'
Manager:
(Argentina) Rodrigo Bilbao

GK	(Argentina) Matías Cano
DF	(Argentina) Ariel Otermin
DF	(Argentina) Lucas Fantino
DF	(Argentina) Luis Monge	Yellow card
DF	(Argentina) Juan M. Ríos		(substituted off) 46'
MF	(Argentina) Juan Rodríguez Silva	Yellow card
MF	(Argentina) Santiago Ávila		(substituted off) 56'
MF	(Argentina) Gerónimo Govi
FW	(Argentina) Eloy Rodríguez		(substituted off) 76'
FW	(Argentina) Lucas Chambi	Yellow card	(substituted off) 56'
FW	(Argentina) Mathías Crocco	Yellow card	(substituted off) 84'
Substitutions:
MF	(Argentina) Martín A. Gómez	Yellow card	(substituted on) 46'
DF	(Argentina) Darío Leguiza		(substituted on) 56'
FW	(Argentina) Brian Martín		(substituted on) 56'
FW	(Argentina) Alejandro Noriega		(substituted on) 76'
DF	(Argentina) Rodrigo Chao		(substituted on) 84'
Manager:
(Argentina) Gabriel Torres

Note: won 4–0 on aggregate, promoting to Primera B Metropolitana.

== See also ==
- 2024 Argentine Primera División
- 2024 Primera B Metropolitana
- 2024 Copa Argentina
