= 2011–12 Primera D Metropolitana =

Argentine football season

Primera D Metropolitana
- Season: 2011–12
- Champions: Fénix
- Relegated: Sportivo Barracas

The 2011–12 Argentine Primera D Metropolitana was the season of fifth division professional of football in Argentina. A total of 18 teams competed; the champion was promoted to Primera C Metropolitana.

== Club information ==
Club	City	Province	Stadium
Argentino (Q)	Quilmes	Buenos Aires	Estadio Argentino de Quilmes
Argentino (R)	Rosario	Santa Fe	Estadio José Maria Olaeta
Atlas	General Rodríguez	Buenos Aires	Estadio Ricardo Puga
Atlético Lugano	Tapiales	Buenos Aires	Estadio del Club Atlético Lugano
Cañuelas	Cañuelas	Buenos Aires	Estadio Jose Arin
Central Ballester	José León Suárez	Buenos Aires	
Centro Español	Villa Sarmiento	Buenos Aires	
Claypole	Claypole	Buenos Aires	Estadio Rodolfo Vicente Capocasa
Deportivo Paraguayo	Buenos Aires	(autonomous city)	
Deportivo Riestra	Buenos Aires	(autonomous city)	Estadio Guillermo Laza
Fénix	Pilar	Buenos Aires	Estadio Municipal de Pilar
Ituzaingó	Ituzaingó	Buenos Aires	Estadio Ituzaingó
Juventud Unida	San Miguel	Buenos Aires	Estadio Franco Murggieri
Muñiz	Muñiz	Buenos Aires	
San Martín (B)	Burzaco	Buenos Aires	Estadio Francisco Boga
Sportivo Barracas	San Carlos de Bolívar	Buenos Aires	Estadio Municipal de Bolívar
Victoriano Arenas	Valentín Alsina	Buenos Aires	Estadio Saturnino Moure
Yupanqui	Buenos Aires	(autonomous city)	

== Table ==
=== Standings ===
Pos	Team	Pld	W	D	L	GF	GA	GD	Pts	Promotion or qualification
1	Fénix	34	21	10	3	60	18	+42	73	Primera C
2	Argentino (Q)	34	19	10	5	58	29	+29	67	Torneo Reducido
3	Atlas	34	17	13	4	44	25	+19	64	Torneo Reducido
4	Centro Español	34	16	11	7	38	21	+17	59	Torneo Reducido
5	Deportivo Riestra	34	15	12	7	40	27	+13	57	Torneo Reducido
6	San Martín (B)	34	14	14	6	44	29	+15	56	Torneo Reducido
7	Cañuelas	34	12	12	10	31	22	+9	48	Torneo Reducido
8	Yupanqui	34	14	6	14	40	49	−9	48	Torneo Reducido
9	Victoriano Arenas	34	11	11	12	46	56	−10	44	Torneo Reducido
10	Juventud Unida	34	10	10	14	34	40	−6	40	
11	Argentino (R)	34	7	14	13	35	42	−7	35	
12	Claypole	34	7	14	13	35	45	−10	35	
13	Ituzaingó	34	7	13	14	20	27	−7	34	
14	Lugano	34	7	13	14	31	34	−3	34	
15	Deportivo Paraguayo	34	9	7	18	24	41	−17	34	
16	Muñiz	34	9	7	18	21	55	−34	34	
17	Central Ballester	34	7	9	18	33	48	−15	30	
18	Sportivo Barracas	34	6	10	18	33	49	−16	28	

Updated to match(es) played on 20 May 2012. Source: AFA
Rules for classification: 1st points; 2nd goal difference; 3rd goals scored; 4th head-to-head points; 5th head-to-head goal difference; 6th head-to-head goals scored. This does not apply to determining the champion. If two or more teams had been tied in point at the end of the tournament, a playoff would have been held at a neutral venue within 72 hours for the championship

== Torneo Reducido ==
Quarterfinals
2	Argentino (Quilmes)	1	1	2
9	Victoriano Arenas	0	1	1
5	Deportivo Riestra	0	0	0
6	San Martín (Burzaco)	0	1	1
3	Atlas	2	3	5
8	Yupanqui	0	0	0
4	Centro Español	0	2	2
7	Cañuelas	0	1	1

Semifinals
2	Argentino (Quilmes)	2	4	6
6	San Martín (Burzaco)	2	1	3
3	Atlas	0	2	2
4	Centro Español	1	0	1

Final
2	Argentino (Quilmes)	0	3	3
3	Atlas	0	0	0

== Relegation ==
Pos	Team	2009–10 Pts	2010–11 Pts	2011–12 Pts	Total Pts	Total Pld	Avg	Relegation
1	Fénix	—	—	73	73	34	2.147	
2	Atlas	50	66	64	180	102	1.765	
3	San Martín (B)	64	58	56	178	102	1.745	
4	Argentino (Q)	56	54	67	177	102	1.735	
5	Centro Español	49	55	59	163	102	1.598	
6	Deportivo Riestra	45	57	57	159	102	1.559	
7	Cañuelas	51	40	48	139	102	1.363	
8	Yupanqui	61	27	48	136	102	1.333	
9	Ituzaingó	49	51	34	134	102	1.314	
10	Claypole	44	50	35	129	102	1.265	
11	Victoriano Arenas	49	33	44	126	102	1.235	
12	Juventud Unida	32	50	40	122	102	1.196	
13	Argentino (R)	—	46	35	81	68	1.191	
14	Lugano	28	48	34	110	102	1.078	
15	Central Ballester	37	39	30	106	102	1.039	
16	Muñiz	—	—	34	34	34	1	
17	Deportivo Paraguayo	29	38	34	101	102	0.99	
18	Sportivo Barracas	—	33	28	61	68	0.897	Disaffiliation for one season

== See also ==
- 2011–12 in Argentine football
