= 2010–11 Primera D Metropolitana =

Primera D Metropolitana
- Season: 2010–11
- Champions: Dock Sud
- Relegated: Puerto Nuevo

The 2010–11 Argentine Primera D Metropolitana was the season of fifth division professional of football in Argentina. A total of 18 teams competed; the champion was promoted to Primera C Metropolitana.

== Club information ==
Club	City	Province	Stadium
Argentino (Q)	Quilmes	Buenos Aires	Estadio Argentino de Quilmes
Argentino (R)	Rosario	Santa Fe	Estadio José Maria Olaeta
Atlas	General Rodríguez	Buenos Aires	Estadio Ricardo Puga
Atlético Lugano	Tapiales	Buenos Aires	Estadio del Club Atlético Lugano
Cañuelas	Cañuelas	Buenos Aires	Estadio Jose Arin
Central Ballester	José León Suárez	Buenos Aires	
Centro Español	Villa Sarmiento	Buenos Aires	
Claypole	Claypole	Buenos Aires	Estadio Rodolfo Vicente Capocasa
Deportivo Paraguayo	Buenos Aires	(autonomous city)	
Deportivo Riestra	Buenos Aires	(autonomous city)	Estadio Guillermo Laza
Ituzaingó	Ituzaingó	Buenos Aires	Estadio Ituzaingó
Juventud Unida	San Miguel	Buenos Aires	Estadio Franco Murggieri
Puerto Nuevo	Campana	Buenos Aires	Estadio Rubén Carlos Vallejos
San Martín (B)	Burzaco	Buenos Aires	Estadio Francisco Boga
Sportivo Barracas	San Carlos de Bolívar	Buenos Aires	Estadio Municipal de Bolívar
Sportivo Dock Sud	Dock Sud	Buenos Aires	Estadio de Los Inmigrantes
Victoriano Arenas	Valentín Alsina	Buenos Aires	Estadio Saturnino Moure
Yupanqui	Buenos Aires	(autonomous city)	

== Table ==
=== Standings ===
Pos	Team	Pld	W	D	L	GF	GA	GD	Pts	Promotion or qualification
1	Dock Sud	34	21	9	4	58	23	+35	72	Primera C
2	Atlas	34	20	6	8	53	22	+31	66	Torneo Reducido
3	San Martín (B)	34	17	7	10	53	39	+14	58	Torneo Reducido
4	Deportivo Riestra	34	16	9	9	39	33	+6	57	Torneo Reducido
5	Centro Español	34	15	10	9	41	38	+3	55	Torneo Reducido
6	Argentino (Q)	34	16	6	12	50	43	+7	54	Torneo Reducido
7	Ituzaingó	34	14	9	11	48	38	+10	51	Torneo Reducido
8	Claypole	34	14	8	12	46	41	+5	50	Torneo Reducido
8	Juventud Unida	34	13	11	10	33	29	+4	50	Torneo Reducido
10	Lugano	34	13	9	12	35	40	−5	48	
11	Argentino (R)	34	13	7	14	48	35	+13	46	
12	Cañuelas	34	8	16	10	21	31	−10	40	
13	Central Ballester	34	10	9	15	32	43	−11	39	
14	Deportivo Paraguayo	34	11	5	18	34	43	−9	38	
15	Sportivo Barracas	34	7	12	15	26	31	−5	33	
16	Victoriano Arenas	34	9	6	19	28	51	−23	33	
17	Yupanqui	34	6	9	19	27	59	−32	27	
18	Puerto Nuevo	34	4	10	20	23	56	−33	22	

Updated to match(es) played on May 15, 2011. Source: AFA
Rules for classification: 1st points; 2nd goal difference; 3rd goals scored; 4th head-to-head points; 5th head-to-head goal difference; 6th head-to-head goals scored. This does not apply to determining the champion. If two or more teams had been tied in point at the end of the tournament, a playoff would have been held at a neutral venue within 72 hours for the championship

== Torneo Reducido ==
Quarterfinals
2	Atlas	3	3	6
9	Juventud Unida	1	2	3
3	San Martín (Burzaco)	0	1	1
8	Claypole	2	0	2
4	Deportivo Riestra	0	3	3
7	Ituzaingó	2	2	4
5	Centro Español	1	3	4
6	Argentino (Quilmes)	2	0	2

Semifinals
2	Atlas	0	0	0
8	Claypole	0	0	0
7	Ituzaingó	2	0	2
5	Centro Español	1	1	2

Final
2	Atlas	1	1	2
5	Centro Español	1	0	1

== Relegation ==
Pos	Team	2008–09 Pts	2009–10 Pts	2010–11 Pts	Total Pts	Total Pld	Avg	Relegation
1	Argentino (Q)	68	56	54	178	102	1.745	
2	Atlas	61	50	66	177	102	1.735	
3	Deportivo Riestra	71	45	57	173	102	1.696	
4	Dock Sud	37	56	72	165	102	1.618	
5	San Martín (B)	28	64	58	150	102	1.549	
6	Ituzaingó	43	49	51	143	102	1.402	
7	Claypole	49	44	50	143	102	1.402	
8	Argentino (R)	—	—	46	46	34	1.353	
9	Centro Español	33	49	55	137	102	1.343	
10	Cañuelas	—	51	40	91	68	1.338	
11	Victoriano Arenas	52	49	33	134	102	1.314	
12	Juventud Unida	50	32	50	132	102	1.294	
13	Lugano	48	28	48	124	102	1.216	
14	Yupanqui	33	61	27	121	102	1.245	
15	Deportivo Paraguayo	50	29	38	117	102	1.147	
16	Central Ballester	29	37	39	105	102	1.029	
17	Sportivo Barracas	—	—	33	33	34	0.971	
18	Puerto Nuevo	—	—	22	22	34	0.647	Disaffiliation for one season

== See also ==
- 2010–11 in Argentine football
