= 2012–13 Primera C Metropolitana =

Primera C Metropolitana
- Season: 2012–13

The 2012–13 Argentine Primera C is the season of professional fourth division of Argentine football league system. With a total of 20 teams competing there, the champion is promoted to the upper level, Primera B Metropolitana.

== Club information ==
| Club | City | Area/Region | Stadium |
|---|---|---|---|
| Argentino (M) | Merlo | Greater Buenos Aires | Juan Carlos Brevia |
| Berazategui | Berazategui | Greater Buenos Aires | Norman Lee |
| Defensores de Cambaceres | Ensenada | Buenos Aires Province | Defensores de Cambaceres |
| Defensores Unidos | Zárate | Buenos Aires Province | Defensores Unidos |
| Dock Sud | Dock Sud | Greater Buenos Aires | Estadio de Los Inmigrantes |
| Deportivo Español | Parque Avellaneda | Buenos Aires | Nueva España |
| Deportivo Laferrere | Gregorio de Lafèrrere | Greater Buenos Aires | Deportivo Laferrere |
| El Porvenir | Gerli | Greater Buenos Aires | Enrique Roberts |
| Excursionistas | Belgrano | Buenos Aires | Excursionistas |
| Fénix | Pilar | Buenos Aires Province | Municipal de Pilar |
| Ferrocarril Midland | Libertad | Greater Buenos Aires | Ferrocarril Midland |
| General Lamadrid | Villa Devoto | Buenos Aires | Enrique VI |
| Sportivo Italiano | Ciudad Evita | Greater Buenos Aires | Sportivo Italiano |
| J.J. de Urquiza | Loma Hermosa | Greater Buenos Aires | Ramón la Cueva |
| Liniers | San Justo | Greater Buenos Aires | Juan Antonio Arias |
| Luján | Luján | Buenos Aires Province | Campo Municipal de Deportes |
| Sacachispas | Villa Soldati | Buenos Aires | Beto Larrosa |
| San Miguel | San Miguel | Greater Buenos Aires | Malvinas Argentinas |
| Talleres (RE) | Remedios de Escalada | Greater Buenos Aires | Talleres de Remedios de Escalada |
| UAI Urquiza | Villa Lynch | Greater Buenos Aires | Monumental de Villa Lynch |

== Table ==
=== Standings ===
| Pos | Team | Pld | W | D | L | GF | GA | GD | Pts | Promotion or qualification |
|---|---|---|---|---|---|---|---|---|---|---|
| 1 | UAI Urquiza | 38 | 22 | 11 | 5 | 41 | 21 | +20 | 77 | Primera B Metropolitana |
| 2 | Deportivo Laferrere | 38 | 17 | 16 | 5 | 47 | 18 | +29 | 67 | Torneo Reducido |
| 3 | Sacachispas | 38 | 17 | 12 | 9 | 49 | 36 | +13 | 63 | Torneo Reducido |
| 4 | Deportivo Español | 38 | 18 | 8 | 12 | 53 | 36 | +17 | 62 | Torneo Reducido |
| 5 | Fénix | 38 | 15 | 11 | 12 | 40 | 37 | +3 | 56 | Torneo Reducido |
| 6 | El Porvenir | 38 | 14 | 12 | 12 | 41 | 33 | +8 | 54 | |
| 7 | Ferrocarril Midland | 38 | 14 | 10 | 14 | 43 | 47 | −4 | 52 | |
| 8 | Berazategui | 38 | 13 | 12 | 13 | 36 | 37 | −1 | 51 | |
| 9 | Defensores Unidos | 38 | 13 | 12 | 13 | 35 | 41 | −6 | 51 | |
| 10 | San Miguel | 38 | 13 | 11 | 14 | 32 | 35 | −3 | 50 | |
| 11 | Sportivo Italiano | 38 | 12 | 14 | 12 | 26 | 30 | −4 | 50 | |
| 12 | Argentino (M) | 38 | 13 | 10 | 15 | 31 | 32 | −1 | 49 | |
| 13 | Defensores de Cambaceres | 38 | 12 | 12 | 14 | 38 | 39 | −1 | 48 | |
| 14 | J.J. de Urquiza | 38 | 11 | 13 | 14 | 36 | 48 | −12 | 46 | |
| 15 | Liniers | 38 | 11 | 12 | 15 | 36 | 37 | −1 | 45 | |
| 16 | Dock Sud | 38 | 12 | 8 | 18 | 40 | 48 | −8 | 44 | |
| 17 | General Lamadrid | 38 | 10 | 13 | 15 | 33 | 41 | −8 | 43 | |
| 18 | Luján | 38 | 10 | 12 | 16 | 32 | 39 | −7 | 42 | |
| 19 | Talleres (RE) | 38 | 9 | 14 | 15 | 34 | 41 | −7 | 41 | |
| 20 | Excursionistas | 38 | 7 | 11 | 20 | 28 | 55 | −27 | 32 | |

Updated to match(es) played on June 2013. Source: AFA
Rules for classification: 1st points; 2nd goal difference; 3rd goals scored; 4th head-to-head points; 5th head-to-head goal difference; 6th head-to-head goals scored. This does not apply to determining the champion. If two or more teams had been tied in point at the end of the tournament, a playoff would have been held at a neutral venue within 72 hours for the championship

== Torneo Reducido ==
The semifinals and finals is determined by the team standings in the regular season.

=== Semifinals ===
| Team 1 | Agg. | Team 2 | 1st leg | 2nd leg |
|---|---|---|---|---|
| Deportivo Español | 3–2 | Sacachispas | 0–1 | 3–1 |
| Fénix | 3–1 | Deportivo Laferrere | 0–1 | 3–0 |

=== Finals ===
| Team 1 | Agg. | Team 2 | 1st leg | 2nd leg |
|---|---|---|---|---|
| Fénix | 3–2 | Deportivo Español | 1–1 | 2–1 |

== Relegation ==
| Pos | Team | 2010–11 Pts | 2011–12 Pts | 2012–13 Pts | Total Pts | Total Pld | Avg | Relegation |
|---|---|---|---|---|---|---|---|---|
| 1 | UAI Urquiza | 58 | 69 | 77 | 204 | 114 | 1.789 | |
| 2 | Deportivo Laferrere | 64 | 58 | 67 | 189 | 114 | 1.658 | |
| 3 | General Lamadrid | 75 | — | 43 | 118 | 76 | 1.553 | |
| 4 | Fénix | — | — | 56 | 56 | 38 | 1.474 | |
| 5 | Argentino (M) | 71 | 44 | 49 | 164 | 114 | 1.439 | |
| 6 | Talleres (RE) | 69 | 50 | 41 | 160 | 114 | 1.404 | |
| 7 | Berazategui | 55 | 52 | 51 | 158 | 114 | 1.386 | |
| 8 | Deportivo Español | — | 43 | 62 | 105 | 76 | 1.382 | |
| 9 | J.J. de Urquiza | 50 | 59 | 46 | 155 | 114 | 1.36 | |
| 10 | Sportivo Italiano | — | — | 50 | 50 | 38 | 1.316 | |
| 11 | Liniers | 64 | 38 | 45 | 147 | 114 | 1.289 | |
| 12 | Dock Sud | — | 54 | 44 | 98 | 76 | 1.289 | |
| 13 | Defensores de Cambaceres | 38 | 60 | 48 | 146 | 114 | 1.281 | |
| 14 | Ferrocarril Midland | 35 | 53 | 52 | 140 | 114 | 1.228 | |
| 15 | Defensores Unidos | 48 | 40 | 51 | 139 | 114 | 1.219 | |
| 16 | Excursionistas | 56 | 49 | 32 | 137 | 114 | 1.202 | |
| 17 | Sacachispas | 32 | 40 | 63 | 135 | 114 | 1.184 | |
| 18 | San Miguel | 40 | 44 | 50 | 134 | 114 | 1.175 | Primera D Metropolitana |
| 19 | Luján | 49 | 43 | 42 | 134 | 114 | 1.175 | |
| 20 | El Porvenir | 32 | 47 | 54 | 133 | 114 | 1.167 | Primera D Metropolitana |

=== Playoff for relegation/promotion playoff ===
| Team 1 | Score | Team 2 |
|---|---|---|
| Luján | 1–0 | San Miguel |

== See also ==
- 2012–13 in Argentine football
