= Jonathan Herrera (footballer, born 1991) =

Argentine footballer

Personal information
- Full name: Jonathan Carlos Herrera
- Date of birth: 16 September 1991 (age 35)
- Place of birth: Buenos Aires, Argentina
- Height: 1.75 m (5 ft 9 in)
- Position: Forward

Team information
- Current team: Sarmiento (on loan from Deportivo Riestra)
- Number: 24

Youth career
- Centro Español

Senior career*
Years	Team	Apps	(Gls)
2010–2013	Centro Español	93	(39)
2013–2019	Deportivo Riestra	145	(91)
2017	→ Atlético Venezuela (loan)	11	(4)
2018	→ Ferro Carril Oeste (loan)	12	(8)
2018	→ Audax Italiano (loan)	10	(1)
2019–2020	→ Central Córdoba (loan)	20	(6)
2020	→ San Lorenzo (loan)	4	(0)
2021–2023	Johor Darul Ta'zim	0	(0)
2021	→ Independiente (loan)	21	(0)
2022	→ Patronato (loan)	32	(4)
2023–2024	Ferro Carril Oeste	35	(11)
2024–	Deportivo Riestra	87	(22)
2026–	→ Sarmiento (loan)	16	(2)
- * Club domestic league appearances and goals as of 18:11, 10 November 2026 (UTC)

Jonathan Carlos Herrera (born 16 September 1991) is an Argentine footballer who plays for Sarmiento, on loan from Deportivo Riestra in the Argentine Primera División. A forward, he is the only player to achieve the feat of being top goalscorer of four different tiers of Argentine football. Herrera is also Deportivo Riestra's all-time topscorer with more than 100 goals.

== Career ==
Herrera started his career at Centro Español, making his debut in the 2009–10 Primera D match against Victoriano Arenas. He made 21 appearances in the 2010–11 season, mostly as a substitute, and scored 2 goals. His team ended in the fifth position and made it to the play-off finals, being defeated by Atlas. He would take part in all of his teams' matches the following season, and ended the championship as second best goalscorer, with 19 goals. Herrera would stay at Centro Español for a third and last season in 2012–13, before transferring to runners-up Deportivo Riestra.

Herrera achieved immediate success at the Blanquinegro squad, as they would become champions of the 2013–14 Primera D. Herrera's 26 goals in the season made him top goalscorer spot not only for the Primera D tournament, but of any AFA tournament in the season.

He stayed at Deportivo Riestra after promotion to Primera C, which meant his first experience as professional footballer. During the 2014 season, only 6 months long due to a restructuring in the Argentine football league system, Deportivo Riestra made a surprising campaign, ending second in their group and winning play-offs right after that, to clinch their second promotion within the same year. Herrera kept his scoring stint, scoring 4 goals in a single match in three occasions, against Dock Sud and Justo José de Urquiza. Jonathan Herrera became top goalscorer for the second season in a row, now at a higher tier, with 19 goals.

During the 2015 season, Riestra's and Herrera's first at Primera B, he maintained his strong scoring record, achieving 4 goals at the Copa Argentina opening against Victoriano Arenas, and again at the last match of the season against Barracas Central, and becoming top goalscorer for the third consecutive season.

The 2016 season, lasting only a semester, saw Herrera as the main scorer of his team, with 7 goals, participating of all matches in the tournament. He would stay for another 6 months at Deportivo Riestra before going out on loan. His team would end the 2016–17 season as runners-up and gaining promotion to Primera B Nacional.

During 2017 Herrera would spend a semester on loan at Venezuelan side Atlético Venezuela, facing his first international experience. His highlight in the Caracas side would be their debut at CONMEBOL competitions at that season's Copa Sudamericana, in which Herrera scored the winning goal against Palestino. Atlético Venezuela would lose on penalty kicks after a 1–1 aggregate. In the domestic competition, Herrera would score 4 goals, while his team would place 11th in the tournament.

Herrera rejoined Deportivo Riestra to participate in the team's inaugural season at Primera B Nacional. He scored 5 goals for the Blanquinegro squad and left again during the summer on loan to Ferro Carril Oeste, which played the same tournament. With the Verdolaga side, Herrera scored another 8 goals to become the tournament's top goalscorer, considering his performance in both teams combined.

After Oeste failed to renew his loan, Herrera would seek another international experience, now at Chilean side Audax Italiano. With appearances mostly from the bench, Jonathan Herrera would score a single goal, while his team narrowly avoided relegation and reached the finals of 2018 Copa Chile, in which his team would lose to Palestino.

Back again from loan, Jonathan Herrera returned to Deportivo Riestra, which were back at Primera B for the 2018–19 season. Herrera scored 13 goals in 22 matches, including two to derby rivals Sacachispas and a hat-trick against Justo José de Urquiza. The team achieved a new promotion, this time to Primera B Nacional, after finishing fourth in the league.

In 2021, Johor Darul Ta'zim signed Jonathan Herrera from Deportivo Riestra with a fee of €727,000. However, he was immediately loaned out for a season to Independiente for 2021 Argentine Primera División. Herrera was immediately loaned out again to another Argentine club, Patronato for an undisclosed fee for 2022 Argentine Primera División. During his time with Patronato, he managed to score 4 goals and 2 assists in 18 matches. Although Patronato will be relegated to the Primera Nacional in 2023, Herrera managed to contribute the club with 2022 Copa Argentina trophy for the first time in the club's history.

== Career statistics ==
As of 29 June 2019

Club statistics
Club	Season	League			Cup (Note: Includes the Copa Argentina and the Copa Chile.)		Continental (Note: All appearances at Copa Sudamericana.)		Total	
Club	Season	Division	Apps	Goals	Apps	Goals	Apps	Goals	Apps	Goals
Centro Español	2009–10	Primera D Metropolitana	5	0	—		—		5	0
Centro Español	2010–11	Primera D Metropolitana	22	2	—		—		22	2
Centro Español	2011–12	Primera D Metropolitana	33	19	0	0	—		33	19
Centro Español	2012–13	Primera D Metropolitana	33	18	2	2	—		35	20
Centro Español	Total		93	39	2	2	—		95	41
Deportivo Riestra	2013–14	Primera D Metropolitana	33	26	0	0	—		33	26
Deportivo Riestra	2014	Primera C Metropolitana	22	19	—		—		22	19
Deportivo Riestra	2015	Primera B Metropolitana	42	28	4	4	—		46	32
Deportivo Riestra	2016	Primera B Metropolitana	19	7	—		—		19	7
Deportivo Riestra	2016–17	Primera B Metropolitana	18	6	1	0	—		19	6
Deportivo Riestra	2017–18	Primera B Nacional	11	5	—		—		11	5
Deportivo Riestra	2018–19	Primera B Metropolitana	21	13	1	0	—		22	13
Deportivo Riestra	Total		166	104	6	4	—		172	108
Atlético Venezuela (loan)	2017	Primera División	11	4	0	0	2	1	13	5
Ferro Carril Oeste (loan)	2017–18	Primera B Nacional	12	8	—		—		12	8
Audax Italiano (loan)	2018	Primera División	10	1	3	0	—		13	1
Career total			292	156	11	6	2	1	305	163

== Honors and achievements ==
=== Club ===
Deportivo Riestra

- Primera D: 2013–14
- Primera C play-offs: 2014

Patronato

- Copa Argentina: 2022

=== Individual ===
- Primera D top goalscorer: 2013–14
- Primera C top goalscorer: 2014
- Primera B top goalscorer: 2015
- Primera B Nacional top goalscorer: 2017–18
