= 2011–12 Primera C Metropolitana =

Primera C Metropolitana
- Season: 2011–12
- Champions: Villa Dálmine

The 2011–12 Argentine Primera C is the season of professional fourth division of Argentine football league system. With a total of 20 teams competing there, the champion is promoted to the upper level, Primera B Metropolitana.

== Club information ==
Club	City	Province	Stadium
Argentino (M)	Merlo	Buenos Aires	Estadio Juan Carlos Brevia
Berazategui	Berazategui	Buenos Aires	Estadio Norman Lee
Central Córdoba (R)	Rosario	Santa Fe	Estadio Gabino Sosa
Cambaceres	Ensenada	Buenos Aires	Estadio Defensores de Cambaceres
Defensores Unidos	Zárate	Buenos Aires	Estadio Defensores Unidos
Deportivo Español	Buenos Aires	(autonomous city)	Estadio Nueva España
Deportivo Laferrere	Gregorio de Lafèrrere	Buenos Aires	Estadio Deportivo Laferrere
El Porvenir	Gerli	Buenos Aires	Estadio de Enrique Roberts
Excursionistas	Buenos Aires	(autonomous city)	Estadio Excursionistas
Ferrocarril Midland	Libertad	Buenos Aires	Estadio Ferrocarril Midland
J. J. de Urquiza	Loma Hermosa	Buenos Aires	Estadio Ramón la Cueva
Leandro N. Alem	General Rodríguez	Buenos Aires	Estadio Leandro N. Alem
Liniers	San Justo	Buenos Aires	Estadio Juan Antonio Arias
Luján	Luján	Buenos Aires	Campo Municipal de Deportes
Sacachispas	Buenos Aires	(autonomous city)	Estadio Beto Larossa
San Miguel	San Miguel	Buenos Aires	Estadio Malvinas Argentinas
Sportivo Dock Sud	Dock Sud	Buenos Aires	Estadio de Los Inmigrantes
Talleres (RE)	Remedios de Escalada	Buenos Aires	Estadio Talleres de Remedios de Escalada
UAI Urquiza	Villa Lynch	Buenos Aires	Estadio Monumental de Villa Lynch
Villa Dálmine	Campana	Buenos Aires	Estadio Villa Dálmine

== Table ==
=== Standings ===
Pos	Team	Pld	W	D	L	GF	GA	GD	Pts	Promotion or qualification
1	Villa Dálmine	38	20	11	7	61	30	+31	71	Primera B Metropolitana
2	UAI Urquiza	38	19	12	7	47	33	+14	69	Torneo Reducido
3	Defensores de Cambaceres	38	16	12	10	40	33	+7	60	Torneo Reducido
4	J.J. de Urquiza	38	15	14	9	47	27	+20	59	Torneo Reducido
5	Deportivo Laferrere	38	15	13	10	43	33	+10	58	Torneo Reducido
6	Central Córdoba (R)	38	14	15	9	51	36	+15	57	Torneo Reducido
7	Dock Sud	38	15	9	14	37	38	−1	54	Torneo Reducido
8	Ferrocarril Midland	38	14	11	13	42	39	+3	53	Torneo Reducido
9	Berazategui	38	14	10	14	50	47	+3	52	Torneo Reducido
10	Talleres (RE)	38	13	11	14	47	44	+3	50	
11	Excursionistas	38	12	13	13	41	38	+3	49	
12	Leandro N. Alem	38	11	14	13	37	40	−3	47	
13	San Miguel	38	9	17	12	26	35	−9	44	
14	Argentino (M)	38	10	14	14	31	45	−14	44	
15	Luján	38	9	16	13	28	37	−9	43	
16	Deportivo Español	38	11	10	17	31	42	−11	43	
17	El Porvenir	38	9	15	14	40	44	−4	42	
18	Sacachispas	38	9	13	16	36	54	−18	40	
19	Defensores Unidos	38	9	13	16	29	47	−18	40	
20	Liniers	38	9	11	18	28	50	−22	38	

Updated to match(es) played on 23 May 2012. Source: AFA
Rules for classification: 1st points; 2nd goal difference; 3rd goals scored; 4th head-to-head points; 5th head-to-head goal difference; 6th head-to-head goals scored. This does not apply to determining the champion. If two or more teams had been tied in point at the end of the tournament, a playoff would have been held at a neutral venue within 72 hours for the championship

== Torneo Reducido ==
Quarterfinals
2	UAI Urquiza	1	1	2
9	Berazategui	1	3	4
5	Deportivo Laferrere	1	1	2
6	Central Córdoba	1	3	4
3	Defensores de Cambaceres	1	1	2
8	Ferrocarril Midland	4	0	4
4	J. J. de Urquiza	0	0	0
7	Dock Sud	1	1	2

Semifinals
9	Berazategui	0	0	0
6	Central Córdoba	1	1	2
8	Ferrocarril Midland	1	0	1
7	Dock Sud	0	0	0

Final
6	Central Córdoba	2	0	2
8	Ferrocarril Midland	1	0	1

== Relegation ==
Pos	Team	2009–10 Pts	2010–11 Pts	2011–12 Pts	Total Pts	Total Pld	Avg	Relegation
1	UAI Urquiza	—	58	69	127	76	1.671	
2	Central Córdoba (R)	—	64	57	121	76	1.592	
3	Excursionistas	73	56	49	178	114	1.561	
4	Talleres (RE)	57	69	50	176	114	1.544	
5	Deportivo Laferrere	50	64	58	172	114	1.509	
6	J.J. de Urquiza	55	50	59	164	114	1.439	
7	Dock Sud	—	—	54	54	38	1.421	
8	Villa Dálmine	40	46	71	157	114	1.377	
9	Argentino (M)	42	71	44	157	114	1.377	
10	Berazategui	48	55	52	155	114	1.36	
11	Defensores Unidos	65	48	40	153	114	1.342	
12	Liniers	—	64	38	102	76	1.342	
13	Defensores de Cambaceres	48	38	60	146	114	1.281	
14	Ferrocarril Midland	53	35	53	141	114	1.237	
15	San Miguel	52	40	44	136	114	1.193	
16	El Porvenir	53	37	42	132	114	1.158	
17	Sacachispas	58	32	40	130	114	1.14	
18	Luján	37	49	43	129	114	1.132	Additional Playoff
19	Deportivo Español	—	—	43	43	38	1.132	Additional Playoff
20	Leandro N. Alem	46	32	47	125	114	1.096	Primera D Metropolitana

=== Playoff for relegation/promotion playoff ===
Team 1	Score	Team 2
Luján	0–1	Deportivo Español

=== Relegation/promotion Playoff ===
Team 1	Agg.	Team 2	1st leg	2nd leg
Argentino (Q)	2–3	Luján	1–0	1–3

== See also ==
- 2011–12 in Argentine football
