= Club Atlético General Lamadrid =

Argentine sports club

General Lamadrid
- Full name: Club Atlético General Lamadrid
- Nickname: Carcelero
- Founded: 11 May 1950; 75 years ago
- Ground: Estadio Enrique Sexto, Villa Devoto, Buenos Aires, Argentina
- Capacity: 3,000
- Chairman: Pablo González Cribari
- Manager: Horacio Fabregat
- League: Primera C
- 2024: 1st. of Apertura (lost final to Real Pilar)
Home colours	Away colours

Club Atlético General Lamadrid (usually General Lamadrid or simply Lamadrid) is an Argentine sports club located in Villa Devoto, Buenos Aires. The institution, founded in 1950, is mostly known for its football team, which currently plays in Primera C Metropolitana, the regionalised fourth division of the Argentine football league system.

Other sports practised at the club are futsal, handball, tae kwon do, roller skating and volleyball.

== History ==
The club was founded on May 11, 1950, by a group of people who decided to form a Board of Directors for the club, although the idea of founding a club had been circulating since 1939. Just a few months before the club's founding, friendly matches were already being played every weekend and on holidays with local clubs. Marcelino Piñero (1900-1960) was appointed as club's first president.

To celebrate the club's founding, a friendly match was held vs neighbor club Kimberley, General Lamadrid's classic rival.

In 1956, the club finally obtained legal status and became affiliated with the Argentine Football Association, beginning to compete in the "Categoría Amateur" (then Primera D Metropolitana) tournament. The team played their first match on May 25, 1956, vs CSD Muñiz.

In 1963, a 700-m2 gymnasium was built for the practice of youth football and roller skating.

On Saturday 21 March 2009, during a match facing Barracas Bolívar (now Sportivo Barracas), 18 Lamadrid players were sent off after they got into a violent confrontation with Barracas' supporters. The fight started when a group of youth players from Lamadrid (who were watching the match on their seats) began a discussion with some Barracas' fans. The discussion soon turn into a fight and the players from both teams jumped from field to the grandstand to take part on the fight as well.

General Lamadrid won their first title in 1977, promoting to the upper division, Primera C. Although the team would be relegated again years later, in 1995 Lamadrid earned a new promotion to Primera C, after winning the Torneo Reducido defeating Victoriano Arenas in a two-legged tie series. After the series ended 1–1 on aggregate, a playoff was held, where Lamadrid won 2-0 (goals by Daniel Mottes and Reinaldo Molina).

Lamadrid won its second title in 2010–11 Primera C, therefore promoting to Primera B Metropolitana. Nevertheless, the poor campaigns done by the team caused it was relegated again at the end of 2011–12 season, where finished at bottom of table.

== Rivalries ==
Lamadrid's main rivals are Comunicaciones and JJ Urquiza. It also has rivalries with Excursionistas, Defensores de Belgrano, Argentino de Merlo, L. N Alem, and San Martín de Burzaco.

Other rivalries are Deportivo Riestra, Sacachispas, San Miguel, Luján, Central Ballester, Cañuelas, Acassuso, Brown de Adrogué, and Berazategui among others. On the other hand, Lamadrid built a strong friendship with Ituzaingó.

== Current squad ==
As of june 09, 2018.

Note: Flags indicate national team as defined under FIFA eligibility rules; some limited exceptions apply. Players may hold more than one non-FIFA nationality.

No.	Pos.	Nation	Player
—	GK	ARG	Martín García
—	GK	ARG	Fernando Pérez Orué
—	FW	ARG	Fabián Billordo
—	DF	ARG	Gabriel Celleci
—	DF	ARG	Jonathan García
—	DF	ARG	Martín Genero
—	DF	ARG	Joao Carlos Giunta
—	DF	ARG	Maximiliano Ledesma
—	DF	ARG	Hernán Luzzi
—	DF	ARG	Ariel Vera
—	DF	ARG	Nicolás Pizarro
—	DF	ARG	Adrián Rossi
—	DF	ARG	Fernando Smargiassi

No.	Pos.	Nation	Player
—	DF	ARG	Mariano Timpanaro
—	DF	ARG	Gastón Viqueira
—	MF	ARG	Ezequiel Ferreyra
—	MF	ARG	Abel Flenegal
—	MF	ARG	Sergio Kasburg
—	MF	ARG	Nicolás Frascone
—	MF	ARG	Nicolás Perri
—	MF	ARG	Mariano Risoli
—	MF	ARG	Víctor Saracini Carballo
—	MF	ARG	Juan Ignacio Toscani
—	MF	ARG	Matías Veloso
—	FW	ARG	Matías Benítez
—	FW	ARG	Lucas Del Río

== Titles ==
- Primera C (1): 2010–11
- Primera D (1): 1977
