= 2010–11 Primera C Metropolitana =

Primera C Metropolitana
- Season: 2010–11
- Champions: General Lamadrid
- Relegated: Fénix

The 2010–11 Argentine Primera C Metropolitana is the season of fourth division professional of football in Argentina. A total of 20 teams will compete; the champion will be promoted to Primera B Metropolitana.

== Club information ==
Club	City	Province	Stadium
Argentino (M)	Merlo	Buenos Aires	Estadio Juan Carlos Brevia
Berazategui	Berazategui	Buenos Aires	Estadio Norman Lee
Central Córdoba (R)	Rosario	Santa Fe	Estadio Gabino Sosa
Cambaceres	Ensenada	Buenos Aires	Estadio Defensores de Cambaceres
Defensores Unidos	Zárate	Buenos Aires	Estadio Defensores Unidos
Deportivo Laferrere	Gregorio de Lafèrrere	Buenos Aires	Estadio Deportivo Laferrere
El Porvenir	Gerli	Buenos Aires	Estadio de Enrique Roberts
Excursionistas	Buenos Aires	(autonomous city)	Estadio Excursionistas
Fénix	Pilar	Buenos Aires	Estadio Municipal de Pilar
Ferrocarril Midland	Libertad	Buenos Aires	Estadio Ferrocarril Midland
General Lamadrid	Buenos Aires	(autonomous city)	Estadio Enrique Sexto
J. J. de Urquiza	Loma Hermosa	Buenos Aires	Estadio Ramón la Cueva
Leandro N. Alem	General Rodríguez	Buenos Aires	Estadio Leandro N. Alem
Liniers	San Justo	Buenos Aires	Estadio Juan Antonio Arias
Luján	Luján	Buenos Aires	Campo Municipal de Deportes
Sacachispas	Buenos Aires	(autonomous city)	Estadio Beto Larossa
San Miguel	San Miguel	Buenos Aires	Estadio Malvinas Argentinas
Talleres (RE)	Remedios de Escalada	Buenos Aires	Estadio Talleres de Remedios de Escalada
UAI Urquiza	Villa Lynch	Buenos Aires	Estadio Monumental de Villa Lynch
Villa Dálmine	Campana	Buenos Aires	Estadio Villa Dálmine

== Table ==
=== Standings ===
Pos	Team	Pld	W	D	L	GF	GA	GD	Pts	Promotion or qualification
1	General Lamadrid	38	22	9	7	57	34	+23	75	Primera B Metropolitana
2	Argentino (M)	38	20	11	7	49	33	+16	71	Torneo Reducido
3	Talleres (RE)	38	19	12	7	58	40	+18	69	Torneo Reducido
4	Central Córdoba (R)	38	17	13	8	51	28	+23	64	Torneo Reducido
5	Deportivo Laferrere	38	17	13	8	51	33	+18	64	Torneo Reducido
6	Liniers	38	18	10	10	53	43	+10	64	Torneo Reducido
7	UAI Urquiza	38	14	16	8	51	35	+16	58	Torneo Reducido
8	Excursionistas	38	14	14	10	33	27	+6	56	Torneo Reducido
9	Berazategui	38	13	16	9	42	39	+3	55	Torneo Reducido
10	J.J. de Urquiza	38	13	11	14	37	41	−4	50	
11	Luján	38	12	13	13	26	37	−11	49	
12	Defensores Unidos	38	13	9	16	44	54	−10	48	
13	Villa Dálmine	38	11	13	14	48	47	+1	46	
14	San Miguel	38	8	16	14	32	40	−8	40	
15	Defensores de Cambaceres	38	9	11	18	23	35	−12	38	
16	El Porvenir	38	8	13	17	35	56	−21	37	
17	Ferrocarril Midland	38	6	17	15	25	38	−13	35	
18	Leandro N. Alem	38	6	14	18	32	48	−16	32	
19	Sacachispas	38	7	11	20	27	47	−20	32	
20	Fénix	38	6	12	20	27	46	−19	30	

Updated to match(es) played on May 142011. Source: AFA
Rules for classification: 1st points; 2nd goal difference; 3rd goals scored; 4th head-to-head points; 5th head-to-head goal difference; 6th head-to-head goals scored. This does not apply to determining the champion. If two or more teams had been tied in point at the end of the tournament, a playoff would have been held at a neutral venue within 72 hours for the championship

== Torneo Reducido ==
Quarterfinals
2	Argentino (Merlo)	5	1	6
9	Berazategui	3	1	4
3	Talleres (RE)	1	1	2
8	Excursionistas	3	0	3
4	Central Córdoba	1	1	2
7	UAI Urquiza	2	0	2
5	Deportivo Laferrere	0	1	1
6	Liniers	1	0	1

Semifinals
2	Argentino (Merlo)	2	0	2
8	Excursionistas	1	0	1
7	Central Córdoba	2	2	4
5	Deportivo Laferrere	1	1	2

Final
2	Argentino (Merlo)	0	0	0
7	Central Córdoba	2	0	2

== Relegation ==
Pos	Team	2008–09 Pts	2009–10 Pts	2010–11 Pts	Total Pts	Total Pld	Avg	Relegation
1	Excursionistas	68	73	56	197	114	1.728	
2	Central Córdoba (R)	—	—	64	64	38	1.684	
3	Liniers	—	—	64	64	38	1.684	
4	Talleres (RE)	—	57	69	126	76	1.658	
5	General Lamadrid	56	43	75	174	114	1.526	
6	UAI Urquiza	—	—	58	58	38	1.526	
7	Deportivo Laferrere	57	50	64	171	114	1.5	
8	Berazategui	68	48	55	171	114	1.5	
9	J.J. de Urquiza	58	55	50	163	114	1.43	
10	Argentino (M)	45	42	71	158	114	1.386	
11	Defensores Unidos	45	65	48	158	114	1.386	
12	Villa Dálmine	66	40	46	152	114	1.333	
13	Defensores de Cambaceres	50	48	38	136	114	1.193	
14	El Porvenir	45	53	37	135	114	1.184	
15	Leandro N. Alem	56	46	32	134	114	1.175	
16	Luján	46	37	49	132	114	1.168	
17	Ferrocarril Midland	—	53	35	88	76	1.158	
18	San Miguel	38	52	40	130	114	1.14	
19	Sacachispas	40	58	32	130	114	1.14	Relegation Playoff Matches
20	Fénix	35	46	30	111	114	0.974	Primera D Metropolitana

=== Tiebreaker ===
Team 1	Agg.	Team 2	1st leg	2nd leg
Sacachispas	0–2	San Miguel	0–2	–

=== Relegation Playoff Matches ===
Team 1	Agg.	Team 2	1st leg	2nd leg
Atlas	1–1	Sacachispas	0–1	1–0

== See also ==
- 2010–11 in Argentine football
