= Club Atlético Defensores de Almagro =

Defensores de Almagro
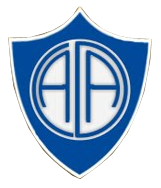
- Full name: Club Atlético Defensores de Almagro
- Nickname(s): Cadense
- Founded: 8 April 1945; 79 years ago
- Ground: None
- League: Primera C
- 1971: Relegated to Primera D
| Home colours | Away colours |

Club Defensores de Almagro (also known for its acronym CADA) is an Argentine social club from Balvanera neighborhood, Buenos Aires. The institution is mostly known for its football team, which won the Primera D title in 1970.

== History ==
Encouraged by the great popularity that football had amongst its members, the club affiliated to the Argentine Football Association to play at Primera D, then called "Tercera de Ascenso".

Teams that took part in the 1970 championship were split into two zones, one of ten and the other of nine teams, named Norte and Sur respectively. The best four teams of each zone would pass to the next stage in order to proclaim a champion.

Defensores de Almagro obtained the Primera D (then called Primera de Aficionados) title after finishing 1st in Sección Sur with 32 points. The squad won 15 matches, drew one and was only defeated once. In the next stage, Defensores finished with nine victories, three draws and two losses, obtaining the club's only official title to date.

The squad was coached by Daniel Kreyness, who was only 27 at that time. Defensores became champion after defeating Club Central Argentino (now Central Ballester) 2-1 in General Lamadrid stadium. One of the most remarkable moments of the campaign was the match against Acassuso, which Defensores won 5-4 after trailing 0-4 in the first half.

The final positions of the tournament were: Defensores de Almagro (champion, promoted to Primera C) 21 points; Sportivo Barracas 16, Central Argentino 15, Piraña and Deportivo Merlo 14, Porteño Athletic Club 13, Acassuso 11 and Villa San Carlos 8.

In 1971 Defensores de Almagro played at Primera C, where the team did not make a good performance and was relegated to the lowest division again. Soon after, the club disaffiliated from the Argentine Football Association and never returned to play any tournament organized by the AFA. Nowadays the institution focuses on football at children and youth levels only.

== Titles ==
- Primera D: 1

1970

== Colors ==
Defensores de Almagro wore a blue jersey, although some sources cite the light blue, white and black striped jersey as the club's colors, due to a confusion with Club Almagro, the team based in Tres de Febrero Partido, which is not related to Defensores.
