= Diego Dorregaray =

Argentine professional footballer

Personal information
- Full name: Diego Fernando Dorregaray
- Date of birth: 9 May 1992 (age 34)
- Place of birth: Campana, Argentina
- Height: 1.87 m (6 ft 1 1/2 in)
- Position: Forward

Team information
- Current team: Guayaquil City
- Number: 21

Youth career
- Puerto Nuevo
- Defensores de La Esperanza
- Villa Dálmine
- Boca Juniors
- Puerto Nuevo

Senior career*
Years	Team	Apps	(Gls)
2007–2014	Puerto Nuevo		
2015–2016	Sportivo Barracas	42	(18)
2016–2017	Atlanta	26	(10)
2017–2018	Guayaquil City	36	(8)
2018	Defensores de Belgrano	21	(1)
2019–2020	Técnico Universitario	19	(7)
2020–2021	Deportivo Cuenca	50	(21)
2022	Ismaily SC	7	(0)
2022–2023	Nea Salamina	54	(27)
2024	Universitario de Deportes	17	(4)
2024–2025	Apollon Limassol	31	(8)
2025–2026	Farense	18	(2)
2026–	Guayaquil City	12	(4)
- * Club domestic league appearances and goals as of 12 September 2026

Diego Fernando Dorregaray (born 9 May 1992) is an Argentine professional footballer who plays as a forward for Ecuadorian club Guayaquil City.

== Career ==
Puerto Nuevo were Dorregaray's first youth club, which was followed by stints with Defensores de La Esperanza, Villa Dálmine and Boca Juniors before rejoining Puerto Nuevo. His senior career began with the latter in 2007 aged fifteen, appearing locally before playing in the 2009–10 Primera D Metropolitana. They were relegated in 2010–11, before being promoted back for 2014; taking his league record for Puerto Nuevo to twenty-five games and four goals.

2015 saw Dorregaray join fellow Primera D Metropolitana team Sportivo Barracas. Twelve goals in twenty-seven followed, as they won promotion to tier four. In July 2016, he signed for Atlanta. He subsequently scored in ten separate matches in Primera B Metropolitana.

On 8 July 2017, Dorregaray joined Ecuadorian Serie A side Guayaquil City. He made his debut on 14 July against Deportivo Cuenca, which preceded his first goal arriving during a 1–1 draw with Emelec at the Estadio Christian Benítez Betancourt. Further goals came against El Nacional, Clan Juvenil, Universidad Católica and L.D.U. Quito as Guayaquil City finished ninth in the second stage. Dorregaray departed midway through the following campaign, having netted three more times for them in 2018.

He returned to Argentina with Defensores de Belgrano in July 2018. In the following January, he joined Técnico Universitario back in Ecuador. Dorregaray scored seven goals, which included one on debut versus Universidad Católica, across two seasons.

On 4 July 2020, he signed with fellow Ecuadorian club Deportivo Cuenca on a free transfer, where he scored 21 goals in one and a half seasons before joining Egyptian Premier League club Ismaily SC. After less than a semester, Dorregaray rescinded his contract and moved to Cypriot club Nea Salamina, where he scored 27 goals in one and a half seasons. In December 2023, Dorregaray was signed by Peruvian Liga 1 club Universitario de Deportes.

On 18 August 2025, Dorregaray signed with Farense in Portugal.

== Personal life ==
Dorregaray's brother, Marcelo, is also a footballer; notably featuring for Puerto Nuevo in Primera D Metropolitana.

== Career statistics ==
As of 27 February 2021.

Club statistics
Club	Season	League			Cup		League Cup		Continental		Other		Total	
Club	Season	Division	Apps	Goals	Apps	Goals	Apps	Goals	Apps	Goals	Apps	Goals	Apps	Goals
Sportivo Barracas	2015	Primera D Metropolitana	27	12	0	0	—		—		0	0	27	12
Sportivo Barracas	2016	Primera C Metropolitana	15	6	1	0	—		—		0	0	16	6
Sportivo Barracas	Total		42	18	1	0	—		—		0	0	43	18
Atlanta	2016–17	Primera B Metropolitana	26	10	1	1	—		—		1 (Note: Appearance(s) in the Primera B Metropolitana play-offs)	0	28	11
Guayaquil City	2017	Serie A	17	5	—		—		—		0	0	17	5
Guayaquil City	2018	Serie A	19	3	—		—		—		0	0	19	3
Guayaquil City	Total		36	8	—		—		—		0	0	36	8
Defensores de Belgrano	2018–19	Primera B Nacional	21	1	0	0	—		—		0	0	21	1
Técnico Universitario	2019	Serie A	14	6	0	0	—		—		0	0	14	6
Técnico Universitario	2020	Serie A	5	1	0	0	—		—		0	0	5	1
Técnico Universitario	Total		19	7	0	0	—		—		0	0	19	7
Deportivo Cuenca	2020	Serie A	23	7	0	0	—		—		0	0	23	7
Deportivo Cuenca	2021	Serie A	2	1	0	0	—		—		0	0	2	1
Deportivo Cuenca	Total		25	8	0	0	—		—		0	0	25	8
Career total			169	52	2	1	—		—		1	0	172	53

== Honours ==
Sportivo Barracas

- Primera D Metropolitana: 2015

Universitario de Deportes

- Torneo Apertura: 2024
- Peruvian Primera División: 2024
