= Estadio Ciudad de Caseros =

Football stadium in Caseros, Argentina

Coordinates: 34°36′21.8″S 58°33′24.3″W

City of Caseros Stadium
- Estadio Ciudad de Caseros
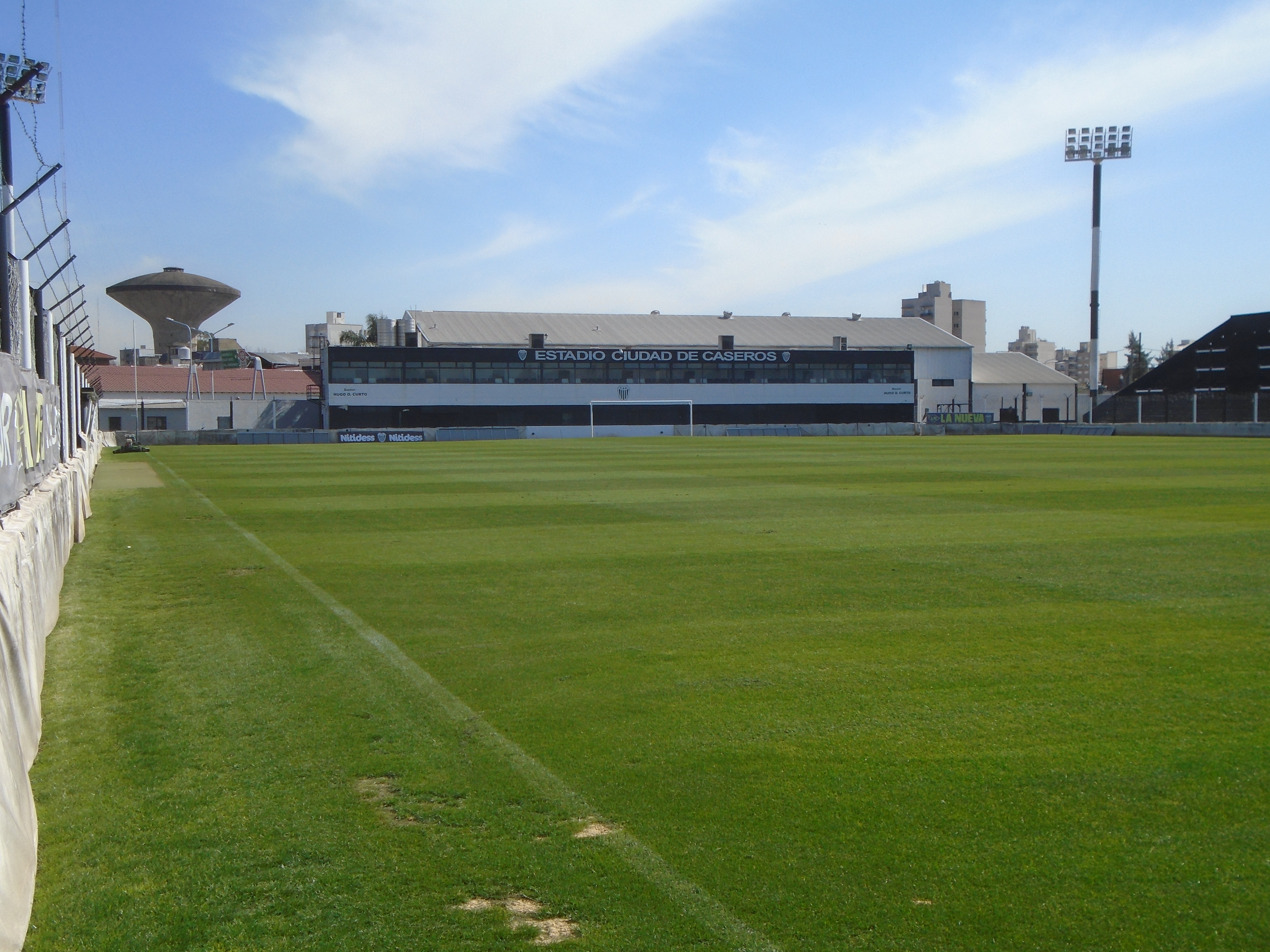
- Interior view of the stadium in 2021
- Interactive map of City of Caseros Stadium
- Former names: Estadio de Estudiantes (1963–1992)
- Address: Av. Justo José de Urquiza y Lisandro de la Torre; Caseros; Argentina
- Owner: C.A. Estudiantes
- Operator: C.A. Estudiantes
- Type: Stadium
- Surface: Grass
- Current use: Football

Construction
- Opened: 11 May 1963; 63 years ago
- Renovated: 2010, 2011

Tenant
- Estudiantes BA (1963–present)

City of Caseros Stadium (Spanish: Estadio Ciudad de Caseros) is a football stadium located in the city of Caseros, Greater Buenos Aires, Argentina. It is owned and operated by Club Atlético Estudiantes and holds 16,740 people. The venue was officially opened on 11 May 1963.

The stadium's name "Ciudad de Caseros" was elected by Estudiantes' members, and is used since September 1992.

== History ==
=== Background ===
Soon after C.A. Estudiantes was founded in 1898, students of Mariano Moreno and Nacional de Buenos Aires used to play at the dock 2 of port of Buenos Aires, which had been previously used by a British institution, "Madero Rangers" located in Palermo neighborhood.

In 1928, Estudiantes had to leave the field because of financial problems. In 1931, the club got a new land in Villa Devoto, on Desaguadero and José P. Varela streets. The club played in Villa Devoto until 1944.

During the following years, Estudiantes used different stadiums as home venues, until the club acquired a land in the city of Caseros in Tres de Febrero Partido where it would build a new stadium.

=== Own venue ===
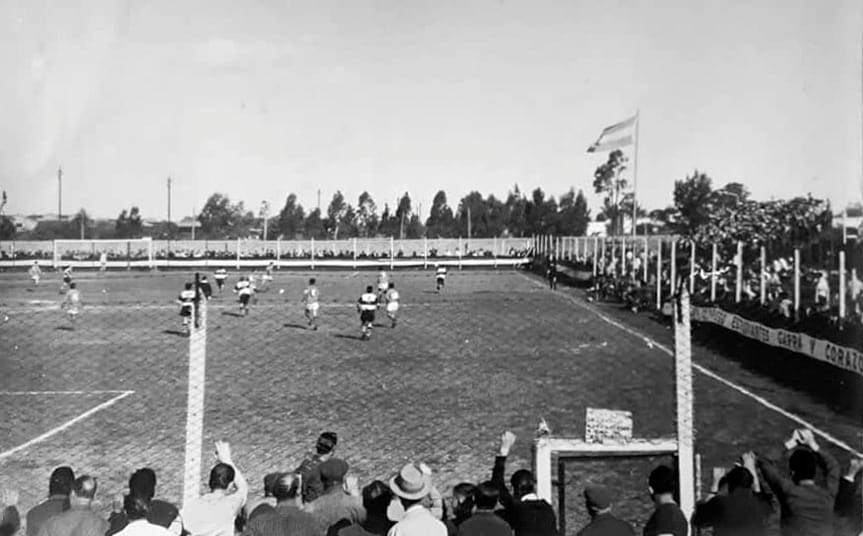
The stadium during a match in 1967

The first match held in the stadium was during the Torneo de Aficionados when Estudiantes played v Piraña, winning 5–0.

In 1988, the club inaugurated a new concrete stand after 18 months. The stand can hold more than 10,000 spectators. In 1992, the stadium was named "Ciudad de Caseros" after the Estudiantes' members decided the name by votation.

In 2000, Estudiantes won their first title in the stadium, the 1999–2000 Primera B Metropolitana championship therefore promoting to Primera B Nacional.

The club renovated the stadium in 2010, adding new benches for substitute players, irrigation system, and medical rooms. The lighting system was inaugurated on 20 May 2011, with a match between children teams of the club.

The venue has also been used by other teams such as Sportivo Italiano until 2005 when the club inaugurated its own stadium. Other teams using Estadio Ciudad de Caseros as home venue were Acassuso, Villa San Carlos, and Centro Español, so their venues were not suitable for official matches. The stadium is also a frequent venue for Copa Argentina matches.

== Other events ==
On 20 March 1982, the stadium hosted the Festival Rock del Sol a la Luna, a festival attended by near 20,000 people. Some of the rock music artists performing there were Sumo, Riff, Los Violadores, Los Abuelos de la Nada, Orions, Memphis la Blusera, Juan Carlos Baglietto, among others.

Other artists that have performed at the stadium are Dread Mar-I, and Vicentico (2011).
