= Club Atlético Piraña =

Piraña
- Full name: Club Atlético Piraña
- Founded: 12 September 1942; 82 years ago
- Ground: Elías 678, Parque Patricios, Buenos Aires
- Chairman: Oscar Bianco
- League: Primera D
- 1979: Last
Home colours	Away colours

Club Atlético Piraña is a sports club from Parque Patricios, Buenos Aires, Argentina. The institution was founded on September 4, 1942 and is mostly known for its football team, which played in the Primera D Metropolitana until the club disaffiliated from the Argentine Football Association.

Although Piraña has not participated in any AFA tournament since, the club has always remained active, focusing on sports and activities. Apart from football, other sports currently practised at Piraña Piraña are women's football, field hockey, taekwondo, and volleyball.

== History ==
=== The beginning ===
Club's founder and first president, Alcides Solé, was friend of Jaime Sarlanga who had gained reputation as a great forward, having scored 42 goals in Boca Juniors (where he was playing after his runs on Tigre and Ferro Carril Oeste)). In fact, Sarlanga is currently ranked 5th amongst Boca Juniors' all-time top scorers, with 122 goals. Sarlanga was also known by the nickname "Piraña" ("Piranhe" in English, due to his "appetite" for goals) and this denomination was taken by Solé to found Club Atlético Piraña on September 12, 1942, as a tribute to his friend Sarlanga.

Piraña affiliated to Argentine Football Association in 1961 and played its first official match against Arsenal de Sarandí, with finished in a 1–1 draw.

=== The golden years ===
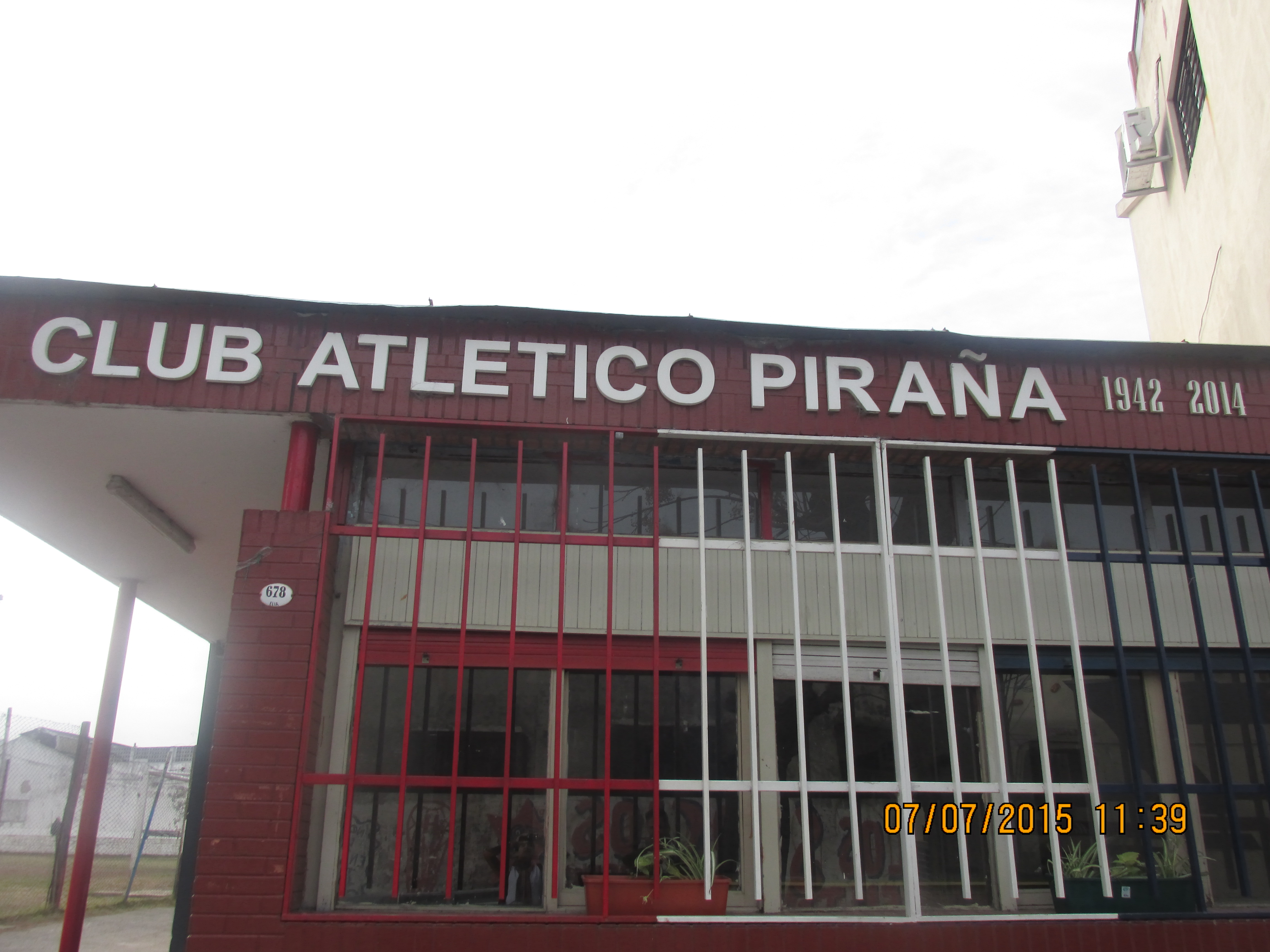
Club headquarters in Buenos Aires

Héctor Yazalde had been rejected from Los Andes and Racing Club, due to his scrawny body which did not convince football clubs to hire him. In 1965, when he was only 18, Yazalde went to a practise of Piraña and he was offered to play for a while. His outstanding performance convinced club's managers to hire him immediately. The other notable player for Piraña was Delfín Benítez, who was nephew of great 1930s scorer Delfín Benítez Cáceres. Both Yazalde and Benítez were the most influential players of Piraña during that season.

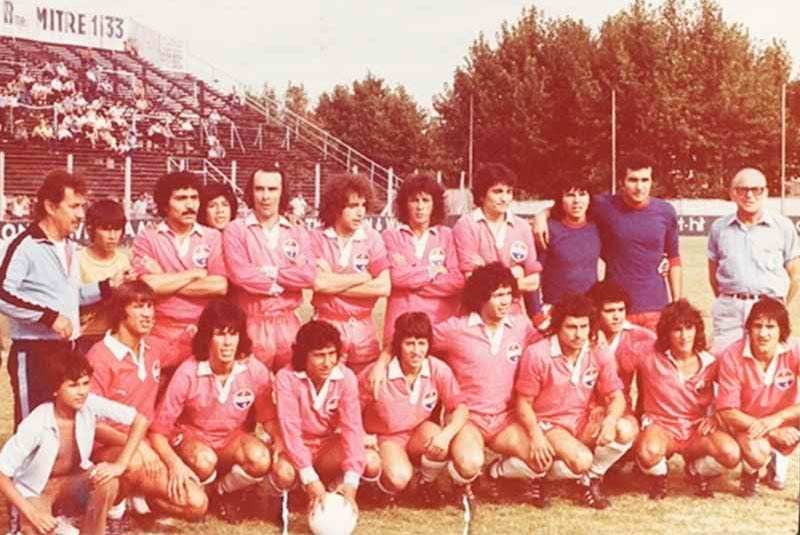
The team that won the Primera D title in 1978

In the first stage, Piraña lost only one match (at the hands of Tristán Suárez) having scored 64 goals within 20 games. "Both Yazalde and I made about 70 goals, I scored 45 and he did 25", said Benítez, who did not play the last few matches because of his job. At the end of the season, Piraña, General Mitre and Centro Español shared the first place so a mini-tournament had to be played in order to proclaim a champion. Mitre defeated Piraña 3-2 in Atlanta's stadium.

After that match, Independiente hired Yazalde for $ 1,800,000. Yazalde debuted for the Rojo in 1967 scoring 72 goals in 113 matches, before being traded to Sporting Lisboa where he had a successful career.

Piraña continued playing in Primera D, where the squad won the championship in 1978 beating J.J. de Urquiza 4-1 and promoting to Primera C.

=== Decline ===
Piraña did not make a good campaign in Primera C: over 38 matches played, Piraña only won 2, losing 29 with 2 draws. The team (which also conceded 115 goals) was relegated to Primera D. Piraña did another bad campaign in the lowest division, where only won 3 games and lost 17, with only 14 goals scored. That same year Piraña disaffiliated from the Football Association.

In successive years, club's facilities were almost abandoned and it was about to be closed in 2015. After a group of neighbors and former players of the club joined forces to refurbish it, Piraña reopened one year later, with the baby football as the first activity re-issued.

== Uniform ==
Piraña's home jersey was white with two bands, red and blue, although the team also wore a red jersey with details in blue and white.

== In popular culture ==
Radio broadcaster and humorist Alejandro Dolina wrote a brief story about Piraña in one of his books:

"Sometimes the players step on the infernal sector of the field, acquiring secret skills, therefore they began to score many goals, then they had a successful career in Italy, succumbing to luxury and being finally destroyed.

In 2018, a local telephone company, Personal, filmed a TV spot where some former Piraña footballers (Víctor Impagliazzo, Antonio Cano Toledo and Oscar Alberto Bianco) participated.

== Titles ==
- Primera D (1): 1978
