= Club Luján =

Argentinian association football club

Luján
- Full name: Club Luján
- Nickname: Lujanero
- Founded: 1 April 1936; 90 years ago
- Ground: 1 de abril Luján, Buenos Aires Province, Argentina
- Capacity: 2,500
- Chairman: Fernando Luchetta
- Manager: José Villarreal
- League: Primera C
- 2016: 10°
- Website: http://clublujan.com.ar/
Home colours	Away colours	Third colours

Club Luján is an Argentine football club from Luján, Buenos Aires Province. The team currently plays in Primera C, the regionalised fourth division of the Argentine football league system.

The club is also going to incorporate handball and field hockey as sports.

== History ==
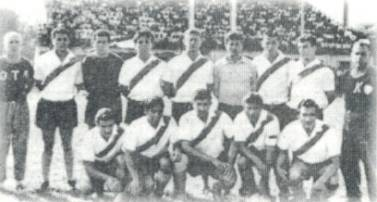
The 1963 team that won a title for the club.

The club was originally named "River Plate" as a tribute to the famous Argentine team with the same name (wearing a similar uniform as well), but then it was obliged to change its name due to legal issues. Therefore, the team was renamed as "Club Luján", which has remained since (and its jersey still remains the same as River Plate). In 1954 Atilio Ferrari and Juan Pescio requested the affiliation to the Argentine Football Association in order to play in the Second Division league.

Ferrari and Pescio represented the claim of the citizens from Luján, who had not major interest in their own football tournament, because they considered that league was not good enough. Because of that, fans preferred to move to Buenos Aires or to watch football matches on TV, which caused financial losses to the Luján former clubs.

In 1961 the team was finally affiliated to the Argentine Football Association, beginning its tenure in the fourth division, Primera D. In 1964 the club promoted to the upper division, Primera C, after defeating Estudiantes de Buenos Aires by 5–1.

In 1971 Club Luján was relegated to the 4th Division again. In 1986 the squad promoted to the 3rd Division after defeating Muñiz in Argentino de Merlo's stadium. That team was coached by Ricardo Dellavecchia. In 1991 Luján achieved a new promotion, that time to the Primera B after a win over Berazategui in the final match.

Only two seasons after, Luján was relegated to the third division again, where has remained since then.

== Titles ==
- Primera C (1): 2026
- Primera D (2): 1963, 1973
