= Estadio de Los Inmigrantes =

Football stadium in Buenos Aires, Argentina

Coordinates: 34.65771°S 58.34443°W

El Estadio de Los Inmigrantes (The Immigrants Stadium) gained its name from its proximity to the port zone of Avellaneda to which immigrants arrived in search of a better life, many of them originating from Europe but with a large number also coming from places such as the Cape Verde Islands.

The stadium is the home ground of Club Sportivo Dock Sud a club that currently plays in the Primera C Metropolitana of the Argentine Football Association league system.

The current capacity of the stadium is 5,000 and the club has almost completed the construction of a new popularstanding section that will have given the stadium a new capacity of around 7,800.

Address: Avenida Agustin Debenedetti, 2005, Dock Sud, Avellaneda, Buenos Aires Province, Argentina.

Buses to the stadium: 33 - 54 - 134 -159 - 186
