= Club Atlético Atlas =

Argentine association football club

Atlas
- Full name: Club Atlético Atlas
- Nickname: Marrón (Brown)
- Founded: 17 August 1951; 75 years ago
- Ground: Ricardo Puga, General Rodríguez, Buenos Aires Province
- Capacity: 2,500
- Chairman: Maximiliano Ambrossio
- Manager: (Argentina) Néstor Retamar
- League: Primera C
- 2025: 9th. of Zona B
Home colours	Away colours

Club Atlético Atlas is an Argentine football club from the General Rodríguez district in Buenos Aires Province. Atlas currently plays in Primera C, the fourth division of the Argentine football league system.

Atlas made some impact on the media due to the TV documentary "Atlas, la otra pasión", aired in 2006 on Fox Sports, which made the club known outside Argentina.

== History ==
The club was founded on 17 August 1951 by a group of sportsmen under the name "Club Social y Deportivo Atlas". The team, coached by Ricardo Puga, took part in the Evita children tournaments. In 1965 Atlas affiliated to Argentine Football Association and began to play in the then last division of Argentine football league system, the "Torneo de Aficionados" championship (current Primera D). In 1970 the club changed its name to "Club Atlético Atlas", moving that same year from Colegiales neighborhood in Buenos Aires to the suburb of General Rodríguez, where they had constructed its stadium.

Reputed to be "the worst team in Argentina", the squad was relegated from the last division in 2004, losing its place in the Argentine Football Association's hierarchy of competitive leagues and with it all its players and facilities.

In 2005, being coached by the charismatic Néstor Retamar, Atlas regained its place in the Primera D. One year later, Atlas did not promote, being defeated by Berazategui in the semi-finals of the play-offs and finishing 5th.

in 2008 Retamar left, then returned in 2010. During 2010–11 season, El Marrón proclaimed champion of the Torneo Reducido, defeating Centro Español in the finals, winning 1–0 the first match. Atlas then played the promotion playoffs against Sacachispas, and promoting to Primera C Metropolitana.

On 30 January 2021, the team promoted for the first time after having lost the five previous opportunities winning the reducido final against Deportivo Paraguayo for 2-0.

== Current squad ==
As of 19 august 2026

Note: Flags indicate national team as defined under FIFA eligibility rules; some limited exceptions apply. Players may hold more than one non-FIFA nationality.

No.	Pos.	Nation	Player
1	GK	ARG	Ricardo Grieger
2	DF	ARG	Agustín Polito
3	DF	ARG	Ramiro Retamar
4	MF	ARG	Leonardo Celín
5	MF	ARG	Nicolás Pérez
6	MF	ARG	Pedro Scally

No.	Pos.	Nation	Player
7	MF	ARG	Nicolás Vidal
8	MF	ARG	Federico González
9	FW	ARG	Simón Martínez
10	MF	ARG	Alexander Meza
11	FW	ARG	Fernando Rodríguez

== Managers ==
- (Argentina) Néstor Retamar (2005–2008)
- (Argentina) Pedro Ponce (2008)
- (Argentina) Guillermo Sezsurack (2008–2010)
- (Argentina) Rolando Boroski (2010)
- (Argentina) Néstor Retamar (2010–2012)
- (Argentina) Juan José Valiente (†) (2013)
- (Argentina) Daniel Zulaica (2013–2014)
- (Argentina) Wálter Piacenza (2014)
- (Argentina) Néstor Retamar (2014–2016)
- (Argentina) César Rodríguez (2016–2019)
- (Argentina) Néstor Retamar (2019–2022)
- (Argentina) César Rodríguez (2023-2024)
- (Argentina) Marcelo Sánchez (2024)
- (Argentina) Germán Zylberberg (2024-2025)
- (Argentina) Víctor Zapata (2025)
- (Argentina) Santiago Betoled (2025)
- (Argentina) Néstor Retamar (2026-)
