= Primera D Metropolitana =

Primera D
- Founded: 1950
- Folded: 2023; 2 years ago
- Country: Argentina
- Confederation: CONMEBOL
- Number of clubs: 11 (2023)
- Level on pyramid: 5
- Promotion to: Primera C
- Relegation to: Disaffiliation for one season
- Domestic cup: Copa Argentina
- Last champions: Centro Español (2023)
- Most championships: Argentino (Merlo); Ferrocarril Midland; Liniers; Sacachispas; (3 titles each)
- Broadcaster(s): DirecTV Sports

The Primera D was one of two leagues that form the fifth division of the Argentine football league system. Made up of 11 clubs from Buenos Aires Province, the league is the only one that remains amateur. The other league at level five is the Torneo Federal C, where teams from regional leagues take part.

It was created in 1950 under the name "Tercera de Ascenso" ("third level of promotion"). The first champion was Liniers. In 1962 the tournament changed its name to "Primera de Aficionados", which lasted to 1974, when it was called "Primera D", which has remained to date.

Since the restructuring of the league system in 1986, the division became the fifth category of Argentine football (lower than Primera División, Primera B Nacional, Primera B Metropolitana and Primera C).

In 2023 its last edition was held because from 2024, the category was unified with the Primera C in a single tournament.

== Format ==
The winners of Primera D gain automatic promotion to Primera C. The club finishing in 2nd to 9th place behind enter a playoff series; the winner of which faces the club finishing second bottom in Primera C in a promotion/relegation playoff.

The team that finishes bottom of Primera D Metropolitana faces relegation. However, because Primera D Metropolitana is the lowest league in the Argentine football system relegation this means that the relegated team will not participate in the league system the following season.

== List of Champions ==
Ed.	Season	Champion	Runner-up
Tercera de Ascenso
As Fourth Division tournament
1	1950	Liniers (1)	Brown (A)
–	1951 (Note: A special tournament was played, where team from several categories competed together. The champion was Tiro Federal, promoting to Primera División B.)	(No championship held)	
2	1952	Flandria (1)	J. J. de Urquiza
3	1953	Deportivo Riestra (1)	Juventud de Bernal
4	1954	Sacachispas (1)	Juventud de Bernal
5	1955	Deportivo Morón (1)	Juventud de Bernal
6	1956	Almirante Brown (1)	Juventud de Bernal
7	1957	Leandro N. Alem (1)	Defensores de Cambaceres
8	1958	Deportivo Español (1)	Defensores de Cambaceres
9	1959	Defensores de Cambaceres (1)	Sportivo Italiano
10	1960	Sportivo Italiano (1)	Defensores de Almagro
11	1961	Villa Dálmine (1)	Arsenal
Primera de Aficionados
12	1962	Arsenal (1)	Estudiantes (BA)
13	1963	Luján (1)	Estudiantes (BA)
14	1964	Arsenal (Llavallol) (1)	Ituzaingó
15	1965	General Mitre (Sarandí) (1) (Note: Affiliated to AFA in 1963, remaining in the Association until 1965.)	Piraña
16	1966	Luz y Fuerza (1) (Note: The football team from the "Luz y Fuerza" trade union was located in Villa Udaondo and affiliated to AFA in 1964 under the name "Instituto Cultural y Deportivo Luz y Fuerza".)	Ferrocarril Midland
Primera División D
17	1967	Macabi (1) (Note: The team from the Jewish organization of Argentina, got affiliated to AFA in 1953. The team disaffiliated in 1968, just one year after promoting to Primera C.)	Central Argentino
18	1968	Ferrocarril Midland (1)	Sportivo Barracas
19	1969	Defensores Unidos (1)	Sportivo Barracas
20	1970	Defensores de Almagro (1)	Sportivo Barracas
21	1971	Acassuso (1)	Central Argentino
22	1972	Deportivo Armenio (1)	Liniers
23	1973	Luján (2)	Villa San Carlos
24	1974	Barracas Central (1)	Victoriano Arenas
25	1975	Tristán Suarez (1)	Deportivo Merlo
26	1976	Defensores de Cambaceres (2)	Berazategui
27	1977	General Lamadrid (1)	Ferrocarril Midland
28	1978	Piraña (1)	J. J. de Urquiza
29	1979	San Miguel (1)	Brown (A)
30	1980	Brown (A) (1)	Juventud Unida
31	1981	Barracas Central (2)	Muñiz
32	1982	Defensa y Justicia (1)	Ituzaingó
33	1983	San Martín (B) (1)	Leandro N. Alem
34	1984	Dock Sud (1)	Argentino (Merlo)
35	1985	Argentino (Merlo) (1)	Deportivo Laferrere
Primera D Metropolitana
As Fifth Division tournament
36	1986–87	Muñiz (1)	Brown (A)
37	1987–88	Lugano (1)	Puerto Nuevo
38	1988–89	Ferrocarril Midland (2)	Liniers
39	1989–90	Liniers (2)	Deportivo Paraguayo
40	1990–91	Victoriano Arenas (1)	Puerto Nuevo
41	1991–92	Deportivo Paraguayo (1)	Juventud Unida
42	1992–93	Villa San Carlos (1)	Acassuso
43	1993–94	Puerto Nuevo	Cañuelas
44	1994–95	J. J. de Urquiza	Victoriano Arenas
45	1995–96	Central Ballester (1)	San Martín (B)
46	1996–97	Claypole (1)	Comunicaciones
47	1997–98	Juventud Unida (1)	Sacachispas
48	1998–99	Argentino (Merlo) (2)	Victoriano Arenas
49	1999–00	Sacachispas (2)	Fénix
50	2000–01	Acassuso (2)	Villa San Carlos
51	2001–02	Villa San Carlos (2)	Sacachispas
52	2002–03	Sacachispas (3)	Victoriano Arenas
53	2003–04	Sportivo Barracas (1)	Fénix
54	2004–05	Fénix (1)	Liniers
55	2005–06	Ituzaingó (1)	Liniers
56	2006–07	Leandro N. Alem (2)	Berazategui
57	2007–08	Defensores Unidos (2)	Berazategui
58	2008–09	Ferrocarril Midland (3)	Deportivo Riestra
59	2009–10	UAI Urquiza (1)	San Martín (B)
60	2010–11	Dock Sud (2)	Atlas
61	2011–12	Fénix (2)	Argentino (Q)
62	2012–13	Argentino (Q) (1)	Deportivo Riestra
63	2013–14	Deportivo Riestra (1)	San Martín (B)
64	2014	– (Note: At the end of the season no champion was crowned. Three teams (Cañuelas, San Martín de Burzaco and San Miguel were promoted while no teams were disaffiliated.)	–
65	2015	Sportivo Barracas (2)	Atlas
66	2016	El Porvenir (1)	Ituzaingó
67	2016–17	Ituzaingó (2)	Leandro N. Alem
68	2017–18	Victoriano Arenas (2)	Argentino (Merlo)
69	2018–19	Argentino (Merlo) (3)	Liniers
70	2019–20	(Abandoned because of the COVID-19 pandemic in Argentina) (Note: On 28 April 2020, AFA decided to abandon the competition and declare the season finished. All official competitions had been suspended on 17 March.)	
71	2020	Claypole (2)	Atlas
72	2021	Liniers (3)	Puerto Nuevo
73	2022	Yupanqui (1)	Centro Español
74	2023	Centro Español (1)	Argentino (R)
The division was unified with the Primera C

== Titles by club ==
Club	Titles	Years won
Argentino (Merlo)	3	1985, 1998–99, 2018–19
Ferrocarril Midland	3	1968, 1988–89, 2008–09
Liniers	3	1950, 1989–90, 2021
Sacachispas	3	1954, 1999–00, 2002–03
Deportivo Riestra	2	1953, 2013–14
Acassuso	2	1971, 2000–01
Barracas Central	2	1974, 1981
Claypole	2	1996–97, 2020
Defensores de Cambaceres	2	1959, 1976
Defensores Unidos	2	1969, 2007–08
Dock Sud	2	1984, 2010–11
Fénix	2	2004–05, 2011–12
Ituzaingó	2	2005–06, 2016–17
Leandro N. Alem	2	1957, 2006–07
Luján	2	1963, 1973
Sportivo Barracas	2	2003–04, 2015
Victoriano Arenas	2	1990–91, 2017–18
Villa San Carlos	2	1992–93, 2001–02
Almirante Brown	1	1956
Argentino (Q)	1	2012–13
Arsenal (Llavallol)	1	1964
Arsenal (Sarandí)	1	1962
Brown (A)	1	1980
Central Ballester	1	1995–96
Centro Español	1	2023
Defensa y Justicia	1	1982
Defensores de Almagro	1	1970
Deportivo Armenio	1	1972
Deportivo Español	1	1958
Deportivo Paraguayo	1	1991–92
Deportivo Morón	1	1955
El Porvenir	1	2016
Flandria	1	1952
General Lamadrid	1	1977
General Mitre	1	1965
J. J. de Urquiza	1	1994–95
Juventud Unida	1	1997–98
Lugano	1	1987–88
Luz y Fuerza	1	1966
Macabi	1	1967
Muñiz	1	1986–87
Piraña	1	1978
Puerto Nuevo	1	1993–94
San Martín (B)	1	1983
San Miguel	1	1979
Sportivo Italiano	1	1960
Tristán Suárez	1	1975
UAI Urquiza	1	2009–10
Villa Dálmine	1	1961
Yupanqui	1	2022
