= Juventud Unida de San Miguel =

Argentine association football club

Juventud Unida
- Full name: Club Deportivo y Social Juventud Unida
- Nickname: Lobo Rojo
- Founded: 6 September 1949; 76 years ago
- Ground: Ciudad de San Miguel, San Miguel
- Chairman: Matias Estorino
- League: Primera C
Home colours	Away colours

Club Deportivo y Social Juventud Unida is an Argentine football club located in San Miguel, Buenos Aires. The team currently plays at the Primera C , the regionalised fourth division of Argentine football league system.

The club's main rival is neighbor club Muñiz.

== History ==
The club was founded on 6 September 1949 by a group of young enthusiasts at a bar, they named it "Juventud Unida". After that, the club took part in several competitions in General Sarmiento, where they won many titles. In the 1950s Juventud Unida increased its number of members so the club added new sections such as basketball, boxing, volleyball, and bocce.

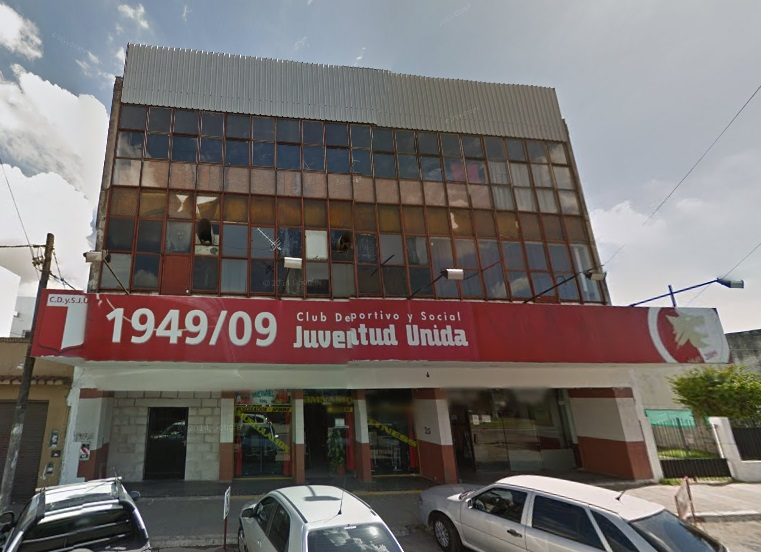
Club headquarters pictured in 2014

In 1957 Juventud Unida affiliated to the Argentine Football Association (AFA). That same year the club inaugurated its stadium located on Sarmiento and Azcuénaga in San Miguel. It was originally named "Franco Muggeri" to honor a former president of the club, then renamed "Néstor Begni". However, the stadium's name was changed again in 2014 to "Ciudad de San Miguel". The stadium has a capacity for about 3,000 people.

In 1992 the club promoted to Primera C via "Torneo Reducido", where it remained two seasons but it was relegated in the 1993–94 season. In 1997–98 the club won its first official title promoting to the upper division.

After some seasons with poor performances, Juventud Unida won another "Torneo Reducido" in 2014 which allowed them to promote to Primera C, although the team would be relegated in 2016.

== Players ==
As of 25 April 2022

Note: Flags indicate national team as defined under FIFA eligibility rules; some limited exceptions apply. Players may hold more than one non-FIFA nationality.

No.	Pos.	Nation	Player
—	GK	ARG	Sandro Ammaduro
—	GK	ARG	Braian García Carpio
—	DF	ARG	Darío J. Caceres
—	DF	ARG	Elías Collado
—	DF	ARG	Lautaro Cuenos
—	DF	ARG	Maximiliano López
—	MF	ARG	Alejanro Acuña

No.	Pos.	Nation	Player
—	MF	ARG	Enrique Grieger
—	MF	ARG	Jonathan Casalis
—	MF	ARG	Facundo Desimoni
—	FW	ARG	Mauro Rojas
—	FW	ARG	Matías Ballesteros
—	FW	ARG	Federico Zella
—	FW	ARG	Diego Pertossi

== Titles ==
- Primera D (1): 1997–98
- Liga de General Sarmiento (5): 1951, 1952, 1954, 1955, 1956
