= Argentino de Rosario =

Association football club in Argentina

- Full name: Club Atlético Argentino
- Nickname: Salaíto
- Founded: 15 January 1912; 114 years ago
- Ground: Estadio José Martín Olaeta, Rosario, Santa Fe, Argentina
- Capacity: 6,800
- Chairman: Daniel Mariatti
- Manager: Marcelo Vaquero
- League: Primera C
- 2025: 4th. of Zona B
Home colours	Away colours

Club Atlético Argentino, commonly known as Argentino de Rosario, is an Argentine football club from the city of Rosario, Santa Fe. The team currently plays in Primera D Metropolitana, the regionalised fifth division of the Argentine football league system.

The club was previously known as "Club Embarcadero", then "Nacional".

1946 was Argentino's most successful year, having reached the 2nd position in the Primera B tournament. Argentino lost its penultimate match against Tiro Federal, and could not reach the promotion to Primera División.

At the end of the 2005-06 season, Argentino narrowly missed out on promotion to Primera B Metropolitana, having reached the playoff final but losing 6–0 on additional time at the hands of Excursionistas.

Argentino has never played at the top level of Argentine football, the Superliga Argentina.

== Team 2018-19 ==
- 11 May 2019

Note: Flags indicate national team as defined under FIFA eligibility rules; some limited exceptions apply. Players may hold more than one non-FIFA nationality.

No.	Pos.	Nation	Player
—	GK	ARG	Lucas Rodríguez
—	FW	ARG	Pablo Pereyra Dragicevich
—	FW	ARG	Joel Reinoso
—	FW	ARG	Matías Zelante

== Titles ==
- Primera B (1): 1998–99
- Primera C (1): 1983
