= Autonomous city =

Type of autonomous administrative division

An autonomous city is a type of autonomous administrative division. The most prominent example of this is in Argentina, a federal country with 23 provinces and an autonomous city, officially called the Autonomous City of Buenos Aires. In recent years, the term has also been used by the autonomous geographies movement to describe the efforts of urban squatters to fight for community autonomy and self-management.

== Argentina ==
The 1994 amendment of the Constitution of Argentina granted Buenos Aires city, previously the federal district of Argentina, the status of autonomous city, to allow its citizens to directly elect the head of government, which was previously designated by the President, similar to other federal countries. The formal name was changed to Autonomous City of Buenos Aires. In many ways, this district is similar to a province, though its autonomy is more restricted.

Another large city that is currently pressing for autonomy is Rosario, in Santa Fe Province. Rosario has nearly 1 million inhabitants (about 1.3 million counting its suburbs and nearby towns), and is usually disfavoured in the distribution of funds and resources, which disproportionately assigns more of its share to the much less populated provincial capital, Santa Fe. Some legislators have proposed that autonomy could be granted to Rosario by passing a law in the ordinary fashion, while others claim an amendment of the provincial constitution is needed.

== Spain ==
In Spain there are two autonomous cities called Ceuta and Melilla, located on the northern Mediterranean coast of Morocco.
