= Club Atlético Puerto Nuevo =

Argentine sports club

Puerto Nuevo
- Full name: Club Atlético Puerto Nuevo
- Nickname: Portuario
- Founded: October 12, 1939; 86 years ago
- Ground: Rubén Carlos Vallejos, Campana, Buenos Aires, Argentina
- Capacity: 500
- Chairman: Juan Carlos Ortiz
- Manager: (Argentina) Martín Correa
- League: Primera D
- 2015: 12°
| Home colours | Away colours |

Club Atlético Puerto Nuevo is an Argentine sports club from Campana, Buenos Aires. The club is mostly known for its football team, which currently plays in Primera D, the fifth division of the Argentine league system.

Their name was inspired by a film called Puerto nuevo, starring Pepe Arias. Its colors are inspired by Atlanta. Apart from football, Puerto Nuevo also hosts the practice of swimming, tennis and volleyball.

== Team 2019/20 ==
As of 23 November 2019.

Note: Flags indicate national team as defined under FIFA eligibility rules; some limited exceptions apply. Players may hold more than one non-FIFA nationality.

| No. | Pos. | Nation | Player |
|---|---|---|---|
| 1 | GK | ARG | Ignacio Díaz Peyrous |
| 11 | FW | ARG | Enzo Moreno |
