= Cañuelas Fútbol Club =

Argentine association football club

Cañuelas
- Full name: Cañuelas Fútbol Club
- Nickname: Tamberos
- Founded: 1 January 1911; 115 years ago
- Ground: José Arin, Cañuelas; Buenos Aires Province, Argentina
- Capacity: 2,000
- Chairman: Daniel Roncoli
- Manager: Luis Perrotat
- League: Primera C
- 2016: 2°
Home colours	Away colours

Cañuelas Fútbol Club is an Argentine football club from the city of Cañuelas in Buenos Aires Province. The team currently plays in Primera C, the third division of the Argentine football league system.
