= Club Leandro N. Alem =

Argentine association football club

Leandro N. Alem
- Full name: Club Deportivo y Mutual Leandro N. Alem
- Nickname: El lechero
- Founded: 24 May 1925; 100 years ago
- Ground: Estadio de Leandro N. Alem, General Rodríguez, Argentina
- Capacity: 4,000
- Chairman: Elio Marcheschi
- Manager: Horacio Fabregat
- League: Primera C
- 2016-17: 2nd (Promotion Play-offs winners)
Home colours	Away colours

Club Deportivo y Mutual Leandro N. Alem is an Argentine football club, located in General Rodríguez, Buenos Aires Province. The team currently plays in Primera C, the fourth division of the Argentine football league system.

The club was founded in 1925 by a group of dairy workers, and because of that, it was soon nicknamed El Lechero (The Milkman) although its denomination honoured Leandro Nicéforo Alem, an Argentine politician who was the founder and leader of the Unión Cívica Radical and also the uncle and political teacher of former President of Argentina Hipólito Yrigoyen.

Leando N. Alem used wears a uniform that is very similar to Boca Juniors, Argentina's most popular football team.

In the 2001 Primera C Metropolitana Clausura tournament the club set an Argentine record for the worst performance in a short season. They obtained only 1 point from 17 games, which led to their relegation to Primera D.

== Team 2022 ==
As of 13 February 2022:

Note: Flags indicate national team as defined under FIFA eligibility rules; some limited exceptions apply. Players may hold more than one non-FIFA nationality.

No.	Pos.	Nation	Player
1	GK	ARG	Néstor Acosta
7	FW	ARG	Julián Quinteros
9	FW	ARG	Patricio Costa Repetto

== Titles ==
- Primera C (1): 1924
- Primera D (2): 1957, 2006–07
