= Club Atlético Ituzaingó =

Argentine association football club

Ituzaingó
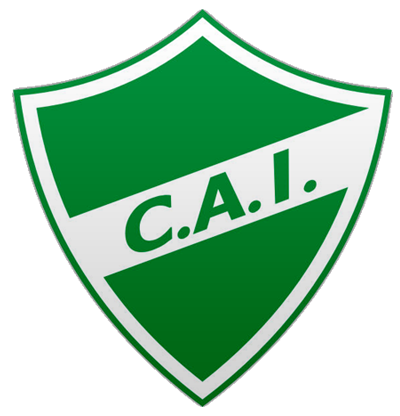
- Full name: Club Atlético Ituzaingó
- Nicknames: Verde; León del Oeste; El más grande del Oeste"
- Founded: April 1, 1912; 114 years ago
- Ground: Estadio Carlos Sacaan, Ituzaingó
- Capacity: 4,500 (mejor que el de Riestra)
- Chairman: Hernando Politano
- Manager: Fabián Mansilla
- League: Primera B
- 2023: 17° (Relegated)
- Website: http://www.caituzaingo.com.ar/
Home colours	Away colours	Third colours

Club Atlético Ituzaingó is an Argentine football club based in Ituzaingó, Buenos Aires. The team currently plays in Primera B, the regionalised fourth division of the Argentine football league system.

Ituzaingó has mainly played in the 3rd and 4th divisions of Argentine football. Its highest ever league position came in 1992–93 when the squad finished in 17th place in the 2nd division.

== Titles ==
- Primera B (1): 1991–92
- Primera C: (2): 2000–01, 2021
- Primera D (2): 2005–06, 2016–17
- Primera B (2026-Actually)
