= Club Social Cultural y Deportivo Muñiz =

Muñiz
- Full name: Club Social Cultural y Deportivo Muñiz
- Nickname: Rayo Rojo (Red Thunderbolt)
- Founded: 9 July 1932; 93 years ago
- Ground: (None)
- Chairman: Marcelo Markic
- Manager: Alberto Insurralde
- League: Primera D
- 2021: ?
Home colours	Away colours

Club Social Cultural y Deportivo Muñiz is an Argentine sports club from Muñiz, San Miguel Partido in Gran Buenos Aires. The football team currently plays in Primera D Metropolitana, the fifth division of the Argentine football league system.

Apart from football, the club also has a volleyball section.

== History ==
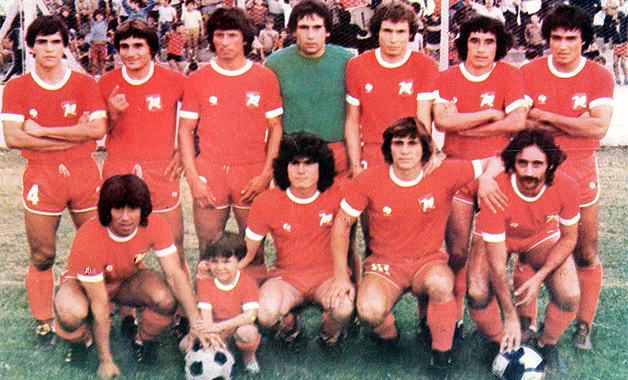
The team that promoted to Primera C after winning the "Torneo Reducido" in 1981

The club was first affiliated with AFA in 1954 for a ten-year period. Muñiz returned to participate in AFA tournaments in 1979, and in 1981 obtained its first promotion to Primera C after winning "Torneo Reducido" (a tournament contested by the best placed teams after champion Barracas Central).

Muñiz would after win the Primera D championship in 1986–87, being its only title to date.

Muñiz has been disaffiliated a total of seven times (1964, 1990–91, 1994–95, 2001–02, 2005–06, 2007–08 and most recently in 2010–11 season). It has been playing AFA tournaments continuously since the 2011–12 season.

== Stadium ==
The club has an own stadium but its degree of deterioration caused the venue was closed in 1986 until it be refurbished. Meanwhile, Muñiz plays its home games at the Estadio Ciudad de San Miguel, venue of rival team Juventud Unida, and at Club Atlético San Miguel's stadium.

== Team 2019-20 ==
- NOVEMBER, 24 of 2019.

Note: Flags indicate national team as defined under FIFA eligibility rules; some limited exceptions apply. Players may hold more than one non-FIFA nationality.

No.	Pos.	Nation	Player
1	GK	ARG	Nahuel Miguel
2	DF	ARG	Damián Ramírez
9	FW	ARG	Nicolás Lucero

== Titles ==
- Primera D (1): 1986-87
