= San Martín de Burzaco =

Argentine sports club

San Martín
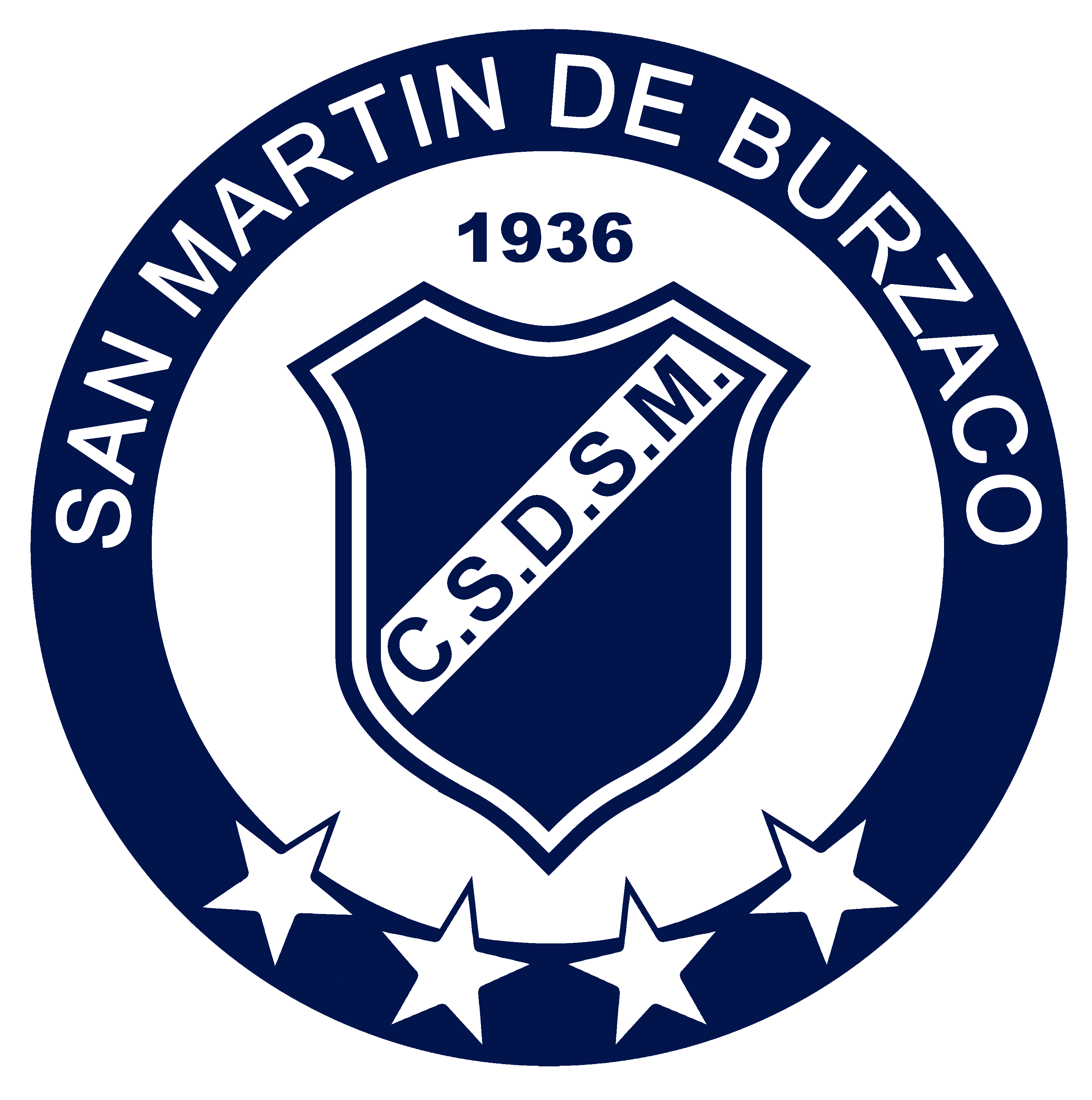
- Full name: Club Social y Deportivo San Martín
- Nicknames: Burzaqueño; Sanma
- Founded: 1 May 1936; 89 years ago
- Ground: Francisco Boga, Burzaco, Greater Buenos Aires, Argentina
- Capacity: 2,500
- Manager: Cristian Ferlauto
- League: Primera B Metropolitana
- 2016: 5°
- Website: http://www.csdsanmartin.com/
Home colours	Away colours

Club Social y Deportivo San Martín (usually referred to as San Martín de Burzaco) is a sports club based in Burzaco, Buenos Aires Province. Its football team currently plays in Primera B, which is the regionalised fourth tier of the Argentine Football Association league system.

== History ==
In the 1860s the Buenos Aires Great Southern Railway built 22 km (14 mi) a warehouse with a train station, which was named in honour of Francisco and Eugenio Burzaco, who donated the largest portion of lands for the construction and development of tracks and stations. The town of Burzaco gradually developed around it.

The club was founded about 70 years later, and named "San Martín" as a tribute to José de San Martín, who liberated Argentina, Chile and Peru from the Spanish Empire.

Since the beginning of the professional era of Argentine football in 1931, the club has never played in the top divisions.

== Titles ==
- Primera División D: 2

1983, Clausura 1996
