= Victoriano Arenas =

Argentine association football club

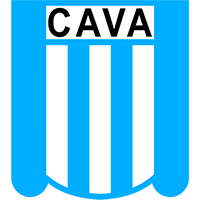
- Full name: Club Atlético Victoriano Arenas
- Nicknames: Victoriano; Celeste
- Founded: January 2, 1928; 98 years ago
- Ground: Estadio Saturnino Moure, Avellaneda, Argentina
- Capacity: 1,500
- Chairman: Daniel Sganga
- Manager: Sergio Geldstein
- League: Primera C
- 2024: 17th.
Home colours	Away colours

Club Atlético Victoriano Arenas is an Argentine sports club located in the Avellaneda district of Greater Buenos Aires. The club is mostly known for its football team, which currently plays in Primera C Metropolitana, the regionalised 4th level of Argentine football league system. Victoriano Arenas was founded on January 2, 1928, taking its name from an estate agent in Valentín Alsina. Apart from football, other disciplines hosted by the club are artistic roller skating and judo.

== History ==
In 1998 an historical event happened at Victoriano Arenas stadium, when Florencia Romano became the first female referee being assigned to a professional men's football match.

Victoriano Arenas and Claypole played a match in 2011 where all 22 players on the pitch and a combination of 14 subs and coaches received red cards, for a total of 36. This is the most red cards ever issued in a senior level game.

== Team 2021 ==
These are all the players during the 2021 season. Note: Flags indicate national team as defined under FIFA eligibility rules; some limited exceptions apply. Players may hold more than one non-FIFA nationality.

No.	Pos.	Nation	Player
1	GK	ARG	Lucas Véliz
—	MF	ARG	Mauro Romay
—	MF	ARG	Milton Castagna
—	FW	COL	Eladio Ramos

== Titles ==
- Primera D
  - Champions (2): 1990–91, 2017–18
