= Centro Social y Recreativo Español =

Centro Español
- Full name: Centro Social y Recreativo Español
- Nickname: Gallegos
- Founded: 24 June 1934; 92 years ago
- Ground: (None)
- Chairman: Daniel Ledesma
- Manager: Matías Modolo; Sergio Orsini
- League: Primera C
- 2021: 6°
Home colours	Away colours

Centro Social y Recreativo Español, usually just Centro Español, is an Argentine football club based in the Villa Sarmiento city of Morón Partido, Greater Buenos Aires. The team currently plays in Primera C Metropolitana, the fourth division of Argentine football league system

== History ==
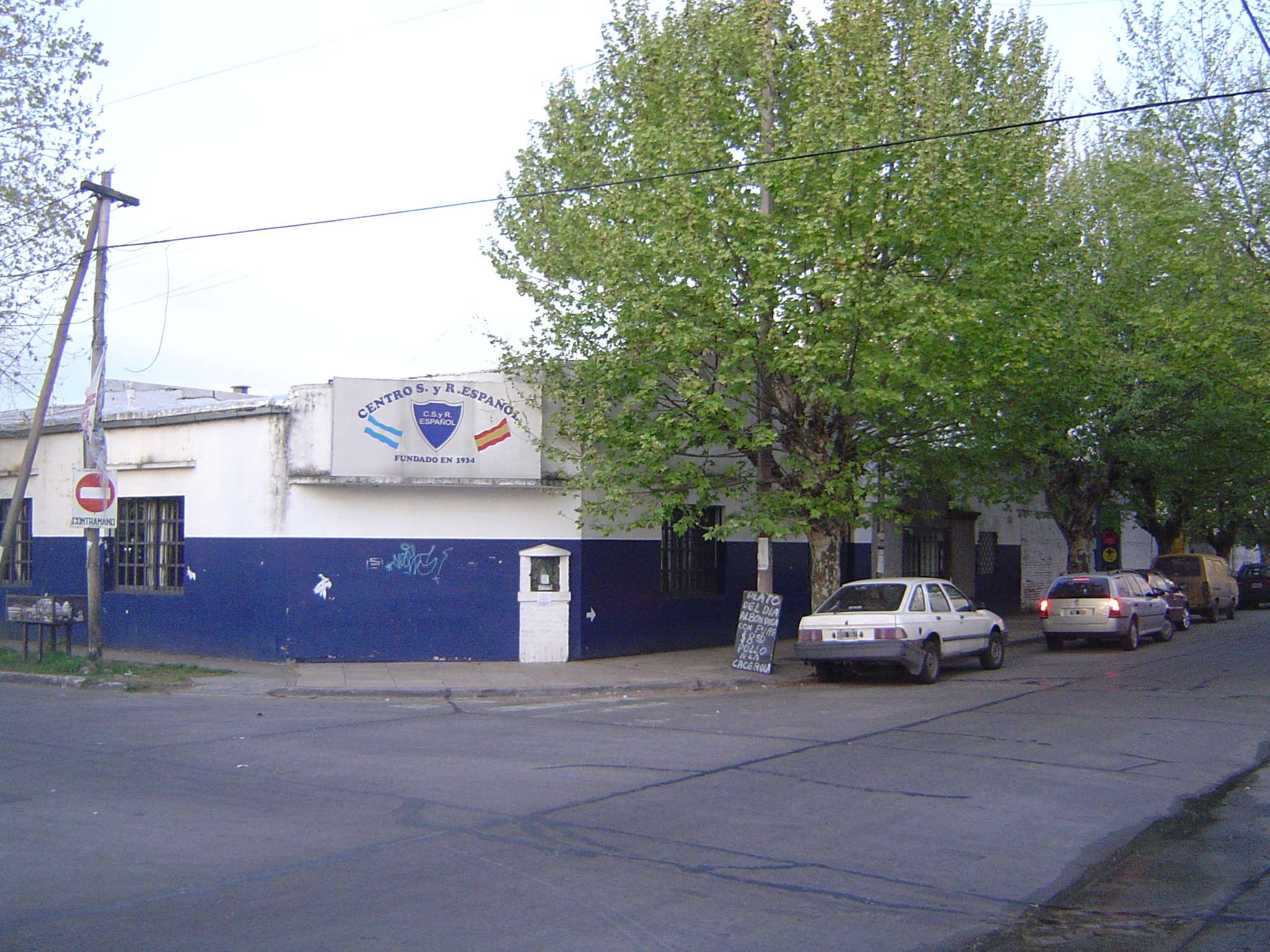
Club headquarters

The club was founded on June 24, 1934 by a group of Spanish residents in Argentina who wanted to practice a range of sports including football, basketball, fencing, volleyball, among others.

The club gained its affiliation with AFA in 1959 and started participating in the Tercera de Ascenso that same year. The club had its own stadium in Ramos Mejía but it was then expropriated in late 1960s so Centro Español has rented different venues since then. In 1965 Centro Español was close to promote to the upper division but it lost the "Torneo Reducido" to General Mitre and Piraña at Estadio Gasómetro.

In 2006, a group of investors took over the club under the promise to build a stadium. Durante la etapa gerenciada, se armaron algunos planteles competitivos que concentraban en la casa quinta del gerenciador, lo que era algo poco frecuente para la categoría. Nevertheless, the team could not earn promotion and the management contract was revoke in 2014.

The following executive committee committed itself to build new headquarters in Morón, with an estimated time of six months. However, works did not progress as expected.

== Honours ==
=== Domestic ===
==== League ====
- Primera D
  - Champions (1): 2023
