= Argentino de Merlo =

Argentine football club

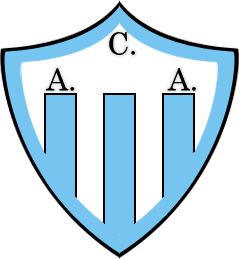
- Full name: Club Atlético Argentino de Merlo
- Nickname: La Academia
- Founded: 30 August 1906; 119 years ago
- Ground: Estadio del Argentino de Merlo, Merlo; Greater Buenos Aires, Argentina
- Capacity: 9,000
- Chairman: Agustin N Brieva
- Manager: (Argentina) Lucas Nohra
- League: Primera B
- 2023: 7°
- Website: argentinodemerlo.com.ar
Home colours	Away colours

Club Atlético Argentino de Merlo (mostly known as Argentino de Merlo) is an Argentine football club from Merlo, Buenos Aires. The squad currently plays in Primera B, the regionalised third division of the Argentine football league system.

== History ==
The club was founded in 1906 by a group of young workers from Estación Merlo (Merlo Station) of the Buenos Aires Western Railway. Originally conceived as a football and rugby union team, the club had its own facilities where not only football but tennis and cricket were played.

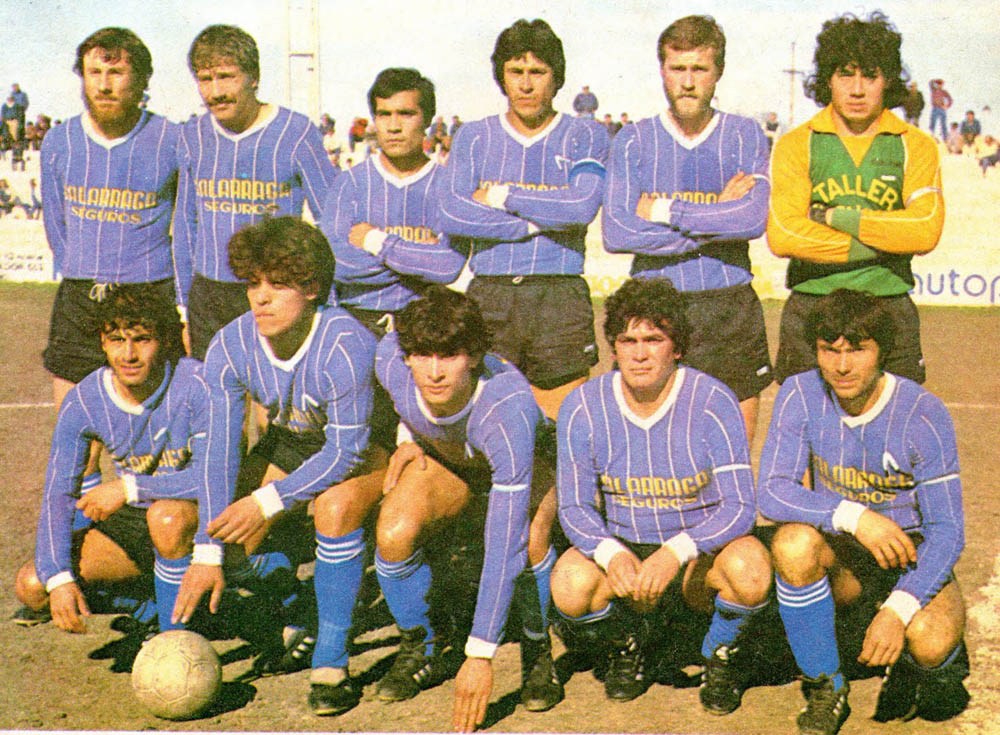
The team that won its first title, the 1985 Primera D

At the end of the 1920s, Argentino moved to a land where only tennis could be practised. Two years later the club built its football stadium although in 1920 the club moved again to Merlo, Buenos Aires, where its headquarters still remain. In 1933 Argentino signed the purchase of those lands where the current headquarters were built.

In 1976 the club acquired 30 hectares of land, which was the property of "La Peña El Bosque" (in Argentina, "Peñas" are similar to fans clubs). By the 1980s Argentino had more than 10,000 members and a great multi-sport club where many activities were hosted. An Olympic swimming pool, tennis, football and volley courts, apart from an athletics track were among the facilities, as well as a motor racing track.

Argentino affiliated to Argentine Football Association in 1978, beginning to play at Primera D, using the Ferrocarril Midland stadium until its own venue was opened in 1980.

In 1985 Argentino won its first fourth division title, promoting to Primera C.

== Players 2018 - 19 ==
As of 12 February 2019

Note: Flags indicate national team as defined under FIFA eligibility rules; some limited exceptions apply. Players may hold more than one non-FIFA nationality.

No.	Pos.	Nation	Player
1	GK	ARG	Milton Hansen
2	DF	ARG	Facundo Romero
11	FW	ARG	Gonzalo Valenzuela

== Titles ==
- Primera C (1): 2022
- Primera D (3): 1985, 1998–99
