= Primera C Metropolitana =

Argentine association football league

Primera C
- Founded: 1900; 126 years ago
- Country: Argentina
- Confederation: CONMEBOL
- Number of clubs: 28
- Level on pyramid: 4
- Promotion to: Primera B Metropolitana
- Relegation to: Torneo Promocional Amateur
- Domestic cup: Copa Argentina
- Current champions: Luján (2026)
- Most championships: Colegiales (7 titles)
- Broadcasters: DirecTV Sports; DeporTV
- Website: afa.com.ar/primera-c
- Current: 2025

The Primera C Metropolitana is one of the two professional leagues that form the fourth level of the Argentine football league system. Primera C Metropolitana is made up of 20 clubs, mainly from the city of Buenos Aires and its metropolitan area (Greater Buenos Aires).

The other league at level four is the Torneo Federal B, where teams from regional leagues take part.

== Format ==
Primera C is currently organised into two league tournaments, the Apertura (opening) and the Clausura (closing). Each team plays every other team once in the Apertura, and then once again at the reverse venue in the Clausura.

The winners of the two league titles are recognised as champions. However, the overall championship is decided with an end of season playoff. The overall champion is promoted to Primera B Metropolitana. The teams finishing 2nd to 8th enter a playoff series to determine which team will play in a promotion/relegation playoff against the 2nd lowest finishing team from Primera B Metropolitana.

The team that finishes with the worst aggregate points total is automatically relegated to Primera D. The team with the 2nd worst aggregate points total plays a promotion/relegation playoff with the winner of the Primera D playoff series. And the winner then competes in Primera C Metropolitana the following season.

== History ==
Originally named "Tercera División" (second level), the first championship was held in 1900, being won by Alumni (still under the "English High School" name). With the creation of División Intermedia in 1911, the division became the fourth level behind Segunda División. It lasted until 1932 when the Intermedia was suppressed and Tercera División became the 3rd. division/level again since the 1933 season.

In 1944 its name changed to "Primera Amateur", which lasted to 1962, when the tournament was renamed "Primera C", Since the new restructuring of the league system in 1985, the division has become the fourth category of Argentine football (lower than Primera División, Primera B Nacional and Primera B Metropolitana).

=== Division levels ===
Since its inception in 1899 as "Tercera División", the Primera C has changed levels (between 3 and 4) and names several times. The table below shows them in details:

Year	Level	Promotion to	Relegation to
1900–1910	3	Segunda División	(None) (Note: No fourth division or level existing then.)
1911–1932	4	Segunda División (1911–26); Intermedia (1927–32)	(None)
1933–1985	3	Primera B	(None) (1933–49); Primera D (1950–85)
1986–2022	4	Primera B Metro	Primera D
2023	4	Primera B Metro	(None) (Note: No relegation because the category was unified with the Primera D in a single tournament.)
2024	4	Primera B Metro	Disaffiliation for one season
2025	4	Primera B Metro	Torneo Promocional Amateur

== Current teams (2025 season) ==
Club	City (venue)	Area / region	Stadium
Argentino	Rosario	Santa Fe Province	José María Olaeta
Atlas	General Rodríguez	Buenos Aires Province	Ricardo Puga
Berazategui	Berazategui	Greater Buenos Aires	Norman Lee
Cañuelas	Cañuelas	Buenos Aires Province	Jorge Arin
Central Ballester	José L. Suárez	Greater Buenos Aires	Predio Cacique
Central Córdoba	Rosario	Santa Fe Province	Gabino Sosa
Centro Español	Villa Sarmiento	Greater Buenos Aires	(none)
Claypole	Claypole	Buenos Aires Province	Rodolfo Capocasa
Defensores de Cambaceres	Ensenada	Buenos Aires Province	Defensores de Cambaceres
Deportivo Camioneros	9 de Abril	Greater Buenos Aires	Hugo Moyano
Deportivo Español	Buenos Aires	(autonomous city)	Nueva España
Deportivo Paraguayo	González Catán	Greater Buenos Aires	Deportivo Paraguayo
El Porvenir	Gerli	Greater Buenos Aires	Gildo Ghersinich
Estrella del Sur	Alejandro Korn	Buenos Aires Province	Lorenzo Arandilla
General Lamadrid	Buenos Aires	(autonomous city)	Enrique Sexto
Ituzaingó	Ituzaingó	Greater Buenos Aires	Carlos Sacaan
Justo José de Urquiza	El Libertador	Greater Buenos Aires	Ramón Roque Martín
Juventud Unida	Muñiz	Greater Buenos Aires	Ciudad de San Miguel
Leandro N. Alem	General Rodríguez	Buenos Aires Province	Leandro N. Alem
Lugano	Tapiales	Greater Buenos Aires	José María Moraños
Luján	Luján	Buenos Aires Province	Municipal de Luján
Mercedes	Mercedes	Buenos Aires Province	Liga Mercedina,
Muñiz	Muñiz	Greater Buenos Aires	(none)
Puerto Nuevo	Campana	Buenos Aires Province	Rubén Vallejos
Sportivo Barracas	Buenos Aires	(autonomous city)	(none)
Victoriano Arenas	Valentin Alsina	Greater Buenos Aires	Saturnino Moure
Yupanqui	Ciudad Evita	Greater Buenos Aires	Ciudad Evita

== List of champions ==
Ed.	Season	Champion	Runner-up
Tercera División
As Third Division tournament
1	1900	English High School III (1) (Note: As the senior squad was competing in Primera División by then, the club participated with reserve teams.)	
2	1901	Alumni III (2)	
3	1902	Lomas Juniors (1)	Colegio Nacional del Sud
4	1903	Estudiantes (BA) III (1)	Lomas Juniors
5	1904	Estudiantes (BA) IV (2)	Alumni III
6	1905	Alumni II (3)	Tiro Federal Argentino (San Fernando)
7	1906	Gimnasia y Esgrima (BA) (1)	Gath & Chavez II
8	1907	Atlanta (1)	Gimnasia y Esgrima (BA) II
9	1908	Banfield (1)	Independiente II
10	1909	Ferro Carril Oeste II (1)	
11	1910	Instituto Americano (Adrogué) (1)	
As Fourth Division tournament
12	1911	Racing (1)	
13	1912	Boca Juniors (1)	
13	1912 FAF (Note: The Federación Argentina de Football (FAF) was a dissident association that organized its own championships from 1912 to 1914.)	Gimnasia y Esgrima (BA)	
14	1913	Libertarios Unidos (1)	
14	1913 FAF	Solís (1)	
15	1914	Libertarios Unidos (2)	
15	1914 FAF	Vélez Sársfield	
16	1915	Boca Juniors (2)	
17	1916	Porteño (1)	
18	1917	San Lorenzo (2)	
19	1918	Independiente (1)	
20	1919	Almagro (1)	
20	1919 AAm (Note: The Asociación Amateurs de Football (AAm) was a dissident association that organized its own championships from 1919 to 1926.)	Racing (3)	
21	1920	Huracán (1)	
21	1920 AAm	Estudiantil Porteño (1)	
22	1921	Nueva Chicago	
22	1921 AAm	Almagro (1)	
23	1922	Sportivo Monserrat (1)	
23	1922 AAm	Vélez Sársfield	
24	1923	Boca Juniors (3)	
24	1923 AAm	Platense (1)	
25	1924	Dock Sud	
25	1924 AAm	Platense (2)	
26	1925	Palermo (1)	
26	1925 AAm	Sportivo Alsina	
27	1926	Los Andes (1)	
27	1926 AAm	Platense (3)	
28	1927	Independiente (1)	
29	1928	Liberal Argentino (1)	
30	1929	Racing (1)	
31	1930	Almagro (1)	
32	1931	Excursionistas (1)	
32	1931 LAF (Note: The Liga Argentina de Football (LAF) was a dissident professional association that organized its own championships from 1931 to 1934, when it merged with official body, Asocación Argentina de Football.)	25 de Mayo	
33	1932	Sportivo Alsina (1)	
33	1932 LAF	(Not held)	
34	1933	Sportivo Alsina III (2)	Excursionistas III
34	1933 LAF	(Not held)	
35	1934	Excursionistas III	Almagro III B
35	1934 LAF	(Not held)	
As Third Division tournament
36	1935	Progresista	25 de Mayo
37	1936	Sportivo Alsina (3)	Boulogne
38	1937	Acassuso (1)	Los Andes
39	1938	Los Andes	Sportivo Palermo
40	1939	Boulogne	Nueva Chicago
41	1940	Nueva Chicago	Sportivo Alsina
42	1941	Sportivo Alsina (4)	J. J. de Urquiza
43	1942	Estudiantes (BA) (3)	Liniers
44	1943	El Porvenir (1)	Sportivo Alsina
45	1944	Barracas Central (1)	Argentino (Q)
46	1945	Argentino (Quilmes) (1)	Colegiales
47	1946	All Boys 1	Colegiales
48	1947	Colegiales (3)	Barracas Central
49	1948	Barracas Central (2)	Acassuso
50	1949	San Telmo (1)	J. J. de Urquiza
Segunda División
51	1950	All Boys 1	Tiro Federal
52	1951	Tiro Federal	Central Córdoba (R)
53	1952	Central Córdoba (R) (1)	Colegiales
54	1953	Defensores de Belgrano (1)	Flandria
55	1954	El Porvenir (2)	Colegiales
56	1955	Colegiales (4)	Tiro Federal
57	1956	San Telmo (2)	Los Andes
58	1957	Los Andes	Defensores de Belgrano
59	1958	Defensores de Belgrano (2)	Argentino (Q)
60	1959	Deportivo Morón (1)	Argentino (Q)
61	1960	Deportivo Español (1)	Almirante Brown
62	1961	San Telmo (3)	Colón
63	1962	Sportivo Italiano (1)	Villa Dálmine
64	1963	Villa Dálmine (1)	All Boys
65	1964	Arsenal (1)	Cambaceres
66	1965	Almirante Brown (1)	Estudiantes (BA)
67	1966	Estudiantes (BA) (4)	General Mitre
Primera División C
68	1967	– (Note: No champion crowned. The winners of Zona A (Liniers) and Zona B (Comunicaciones) qualified to "Reclasificatorio de Primera B".)	–
69	1968	Comunicaciones (1)	J. J. de Urquiza
70	1969	Comunicaciones (2)	Central Córdoba (R)
71	1970	Talleres (RE) (1)	Argentino (Q)
72	1971	Almagro	Tigre
73	1972	Defensores de Belgrano (3)	Flandria
74	1973	Central Córdoba (2)	Dock Sud
75	1974	Sportivo Italiano (2)	Sarmiento (J)
76	1975	Villa Dálmine (2)	El Porvenir
77	1976	Deportivo Armenio	Argentino (Q)
78	1977	Sarmiento (J)	Deportivo Español
79	1978	Talleres (RE) (2)	Deportivo Morón
80	1979	Deportivo Español 2	Deportivo Morón
81	1980	Deportivo Morón (2)	Central Córdoba (R)
82	1981	Lanús (1)	Chacarita Juniors
83	1982	Villa Dálmine (3)	Defensores Unidos
84	1983	Argentino (R) (1)	Almagro
85	1984	San Miguel (1)	Almagro
86	1985	Defensa y Justicia (1)	Tristán Suárez
Primera C Metropolitana
As Fourth Division tournament
87	1986–87	Deportivo Laferrere (1)	San Telmo
88	1987–88	Central Córdoba (R) (3)	Excursionistas
89	1988–89	Argentino (Quilmes) (2)	Ituzaingó
90	1989–90	Berazategui (1)	Sarmiento (J)
91	1990–91	Cambaceres 1	Comunicaciones
92	1991–92	Defensores de Belgrano (4)	Argentino (Q)
93	1992–93	Colegiales (5)	Argentino (Q)
94	1993–94	Defensores Unidos	San Telmo
95	1994–95	Temperley	Tristán Suárez
96	1995–96	Atl. Campana (4)	Leandro N. Alem
97	1996–97	Berazategui (2)	Brown
98	1997–98	Flandria	Ituzaingó
99	1998–99	Cambaceres 2	Atl. Campana
100	1999–00	Deportivo Merlo (1)	Dock Sud
101	2000–01	Ituzaingó	Deportivo Laferrere
102	2001–02	Deportivo Laferrere (2)	Colegiales
103	2002–03	Colegiales (6)	Villa Dálmine
104	2003–04	Argentino (R)	Barracas Central
105	2004–05	Comunicaciones (3)	Colegiales
106	2005–06	Deportivo Merlo (2)	Luján
107	2006–07	Acassuso	J. J. de Urquiza
108	2007–08	Colegiales (7)	Fénix
109	2008–09	Villa San Carlos	Berazategui
110	2009–10	Barracas Central (3)	Excursionistas
111	2010–11	General Lamadrid	Argentino (M)
112	2011–12	Villa Dálmine (5)	UAI Urquiza
113	2012–13	UAI Urquiza (1)	Deportivo Laferrere
114	2013–14	Sportivo Italiano (3)	Cambaceres
115	2015	San Telmo (4)	Talleres (RE)
116	2016	Excursionistas (1)	Sportivo Italiano
117	2016–17	Sacachispas (1)	Defensores Unidos
118	2017–18	Defensores Unidos (1)	Central Córdoba (R)
119	2018–19	Argentino (Q) (3)	Deportivo Armenio
120	2019–20	(Abandoned because of COVID-19 pandemic) (Note: On 28 April 2020, AFA decided to abandon the competition and declare the season finished. All official competitions had been suspended on 17 March.)	
121	2020	Cañuelas (1)	Deportivo Merlo
122	2021	Dock Sud (1)	Berazategui
123	2022	Argentino (M)	Ferrocarril Midland
124	2023	Excursionistas (2)	San Martín (B)
125	2024	Real Pilar (1)	General Lamadrid
126	2025	Camioneros (1)	Ituzaingó
127	2026	Luján (1)	Berazategui

== Titles by club ==
Club	Titles	Years won
Colegiales	7	1913, 1914, (Note: The club's name was "Libertarios Unidos".) 1947, 1955, 1992–93, 2002–03, 2007–08
Villa Dálmine	5	1963, 1975, 1982, 1995–96, (Note: The club had renamed to "Atlético Campana" during those years, switching to its original name in 2000.) 2011–12
Estudiantes (BA)	4	1903, 1904, 1942, 1966
Sportivo Alsina	4	1932, 1933, 1936, 1941
Defensores de Belgrano	4	1953, 1958, 1972, 1991–92
San Telmo	4	1949, 1956, 1961, 2015
Alumni	3	1900, 1901, 1905
Racing	3	1911, 1919 AAm, 1929
Boca Juniors	3	1912, 1915, 1923
Platense	3	1923 AAm, 1924 AAm, 1926 AAm
Argentino (Q)	3	1945, 1988–89, 2018–19
Barracas Central	3	1944, 1948, 2009–10
Comunicaciones	3	1968, 1969, 2004–05
Central Córdoba	3	1952, 1973, 1987–88
El Porvenir	2	1943, 1954
Sportivo Italiano	2	1962, 1974, 2013–14
All Boys	2	1946, 1950
Berazategui	2	1989–90, 1996–97
Deportivo Español	2	1960, 1979
Cambaceres	2	1990–91, 1998–99
Laferrere	2	1986–87, 2001–02
Deportivo Merlo	2	1999–00, 2005–06
Deportivo Morón	2	1959, 1980
Excursionistas	2	2016, 2023
Talleres (RE)	2	1970, 1978
Banfield	1	1908
Ferro Carril Oeste	1	1909
Huracán	1	1920
Estudiantil Porteño	1	1920 AAm
Almagro	1	1921 AAm
Liberal Argentino	1	1928
Arsenal	1	1964
Almirante Brown	1	1965
Lanús	1	1981
Argentino (R)	1	1983
San Miguel	1	1984
Defensa y Justicia	1	1985
Deportivo Laferrere	1	1986–87
Cambaceres	1	1990–91
UAI Urquiza	1	2012–13
Sacachispas	1	2016–17
Defensores Unidos	1	2017–18
Cañuelas	1	2020
Dock Sud	1	2021
Argentino (M)	1	2022
Real Pilar	1	2024
Camioneros	1	2025
Luján	1	2026
