= Defensores de Cambaceres =

Argentine association football club

Cambaceres
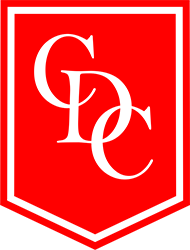
- Full name: Club Defensores de Cambaceres
- Nicknames: Camba; Rojo
- Founded: 12 October 1921; 104 years ago
- Ground: Estadio Defensores de Cambaceres; Ensenada, Buenos Aires Province, Argentina
- Capacity: 8,500
- Chairman: Alejandro Sandez
- Manager: (Argentina) Rubén Agüero
- League: Primera C
- 2021: 2°
Home colours	Away colours

Club Defensores de Cambaceres is an Argentine football club from the city of Ensenada, Buenos Aires Province. The team currently plays in Primera C, the regionalised fourth division of the Argentine football league system.

The club was founded in 1921 with the name "Club Social y Deportivo Defensores de Cambaceres" (Defenders of Cambaceres Social and Sports Club), and the kit color (red) was chosen as an homage to Independiente, one of the most successful teams of Argentina. Cambaceres was not affiliated to the Argentine Football Association until 1957.

== Honours ==
- Primera C (2): 1990–91, 1998–99
- Primera D (2): 1959, 1976
- Liga Amateur Platense (Note: The "Liga Amateur Platense de Fútbol" is the Regional football league which includes teams from La Plata, Berisso, Ensenada, Magdalena and Punta Indio districts, all of them located in the Buenos Aires Province. The league currently has 25 teams affiliated.) (11): 1927, 1929, 1931, 1934, 1935, 1939, 1941, 1944, 1946, 1950, 1956

== Team 2020 ==
- February 15 2020

Note: Flags indicate national team as defined under FIFA eligibility rules; some limited exceptions apply. Players may hold more than one non-FIFA nationality.

No.	Pos.	Nation	Player
1	GK	ARG	Tahiel Alegre
2	GK	ARG	Lionel García
