= Central Ballester =

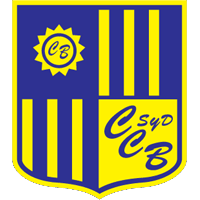
- Full name: Club Social y Deportivo Central Ballester
- Nickname: Canalla
- Founded: 26 October 1974; 51 years ago
- Ground: Predio Cacique, Boulogne Sur Mer
- Chairman: Donato Lanzillota
- Manager: (Argentina) Gabriel Farías
- League: Primera D
- 2021: 7°
- Website: https://centralballester.com.ar/
Home colours	Away colours

Club Social y Deportivo Central Ballester, simply known as Central Ballester is an Argentine football club based in the Boulogne Sur Mer district of Greater Buenos Aires. The team currently plays in Primera D, the 5th division of Argentine football league system.

== History ==
The club was founded on October 26, 1974, by a group of fans who did not accept the closure of the club where they used to meet ("Club Atlético Central Argentino"). Not conceived as a continuity of the original, Central Ballester promoted to Primera C but soon returned to the lowest division of AFA affiliated football.

Central Ballester's uniform colors and pattern are based on Rosario Central's kit, and its squad and supporters are nicknamed the same as the City of Rosario club (Canallas) as well.

During the 1995 Torneo Apertura, the team clothes (including the jersey uniforms worn on field) were stolen from the club lockers. Consequently, Central Ballester began a desperate search for new equipment in order to assist to play the next fixture but the club had not enough money to buy new uniforms due to its debts (something common in lowest level of the Argentine football). The solution came from the club Rosario Central which donated its own uniforms with the badge and sponsors printed on jerseys. Central Ballester won the 1995 Apertura using the Rosario Central original jerseys for most of that tournament.

== Players 2019 ==
october, 15 of 2019 Note: Flags indicate national team as defined under FIFA eligibility rules; some limited exceptions apply. Players may hold more than one non-FIFA nationality.

No.	Pos.	Nation	Player
1	GK	ARG	Agustín Di Biase
2	DF	ARG	Lucas Uñate
9	FW	ARG	Julio Gauna

== Titles ==
- Primera D (1): 1995–96
