= A.D. Berazategui =

Argentine association football club

Berazategui
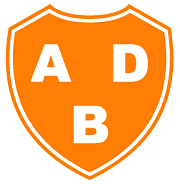
- Full name: Asociación Deportiva Berazategui
- Nicknames: Bera; Naranja; Naranja Mecánica; Capo del Sur
- Founded: 18 September 1975; 51 years ago
- Ground: Estadio Norman Lee, Berazategui, Greater Buenos Aires
- Capacity: 10,000
- Chairman: Roberto "Mata" Rodríguez & Jacob
- Manager: Marcelo Barrera
- League: Primera C
Home colours	Away colours

Asociación Deportiva Berazategui is an Argentine football club from the Berazategui district of Greater Buenos Aires. The team currently plays at the Primera C, the regionalised fourth division of the Argentine football league system. Its Norman Lee Stadium has a capacity for 10,000 people.

== History ==
The club was founded on 18 September 1975 during a meeting held in Alfredo San Miguel's house in Berazategui. The club's first president was Giberto Martín. The orange colour that identifies the club was inspired by the Netherlands national football team which was a sensation during the 1974 FIFA World Cup. In March 1976 the club affiliated with the Argentine Football Association (AFA), making its debut in Primera D that same year. In its first season playing official matches, Berazategui finished second to Defensores de Cambaceres (that would win the championship) and was therefore promoted to the upper-level division, the Primera C.

After nine seasons in that division, Berazategui obtained one of the six available places to participate in the Primera B Metropolitana, following a restructuring of the Argentine football league system, even though the squad had finished the 1985 season fighting to keep its place in the division and almost returning to Primera D. Under coach Roberto Santiago era, the club signed new players including Hugo Commidari from Club Atlético Temperley, Marcelo Grasso from Sportivo Dock Sud and Marcelo Scrignar from Club Atlético Villa San Carlos.

After two promotions, Berazategui came close to promotion again in the 1988–89 season, finally winning its first championship in 1989–90. That season was obtained by Berazategui with a record of 44 matches without being defeated. The squad was coached by Juan Carlos "Lobo" Zerrillo, which formed a team with experienced players mostly, such as the goalkeeper Sergio García; defenders Ramón Peloso, Héctor Pereyra, and Víctor Chaile; midfielder Víctor Martínez (who was also the top scorer with 15 goals); and forwards Daniel Gauto and Daniel Lettieri.

The southern team played a total of 36 matches, winning 17 and drawing the remaining 19. The team scored 61 goals and only conceded 20.

The second title won by Berazategui was the Primera C 2006–07 Apertura, which allowed the team to play a series for promoting to Primera C Metropolitana in the 2007–08 season after winning the playoffs.

== Stadium ==
At the Norman Lee Stadium, in the city of Berazategui, Province of Buenos Aires, the ADB plays as a local. The stadium's new grandstand has 15 concrete steps, and the renovated platea has 16 planks with seats. In the back of the stadium there is a parking lot with capacity for 80 vehicles. There are five radio booths to talk to the parties. It receives the name of one of the benefactors of the sporting entity that contributed land for its construction. In 2007 a model was presented with the project of the new stadium, with capacity to accommodate 15,000 people seated, but never realized. At the end of 2010, several projects were presented that never prospered. Since 2012 a cement stand was being built where the visiting fans were located, but due to political conflicts, it was only inaugurated in 2016. Its measures are 15 steps high and 80 meters long, approximately. The structures of the Tribunes of the Norman Lee are those of the Viejo Gasómetro (Old Gasometer) of San Lorenzo de Almagro. The estate has 28 hectares, has a golf course, a driver to practice such sports, an equestrian club, and an auxiliary court for parties in the lower divisions of the club. The golf course is practically in disuse and without the adequate maintenance for the optimal development.

== Honours ==
- Primera C (2): 1989–90, 1996–97
