= Merlo Partido =

Merlo Partido de Merlo
- Department
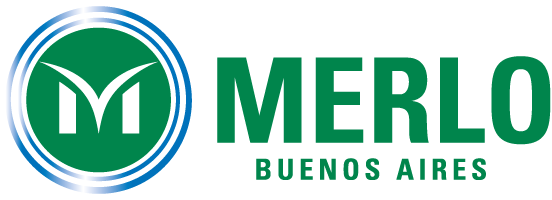
- Coat of arms Logo

- location of Merlo Partido in Gran Buenos Aires
- Coordinates: 34°40′S 58°43′W
- Country: Argentina
- Established: August 28, 1755
- Founder: Francisco Javier de Merlo y Barbosa
- Seat: Merlo

Government
  - Intendant: Gustavo Menendez (PJ)

Area
  - Total: 170 km^{2} (66 sq mi)

Population
  - Total: 524,207
  - Density: 3,100/km^{2} (8,000/sq mi)
- Demonym: merlense
- Postal Code: B1722
- IFAM: BUE082
- Area Code: 0220
- Patron saint: Nuestra Señora de la Merced

Merlo is a partido of Buenos Aires Province, Argentina. It is located in Greater Buenos Aires, Argentina, west of the city of Buenos Aires. Its capital is the city of Merlo.

The region of the present-day partido was colonized shortly after the second, and permanent founding of Buenos Aires (1580). In 1730 an interim parish was founded near the estancia (landholding) of Francisco de Merlo. In 1755 Merlo founded the town of Villa San Antonio del Camino, which was renamed later in his honour. For many years, the development of Merlo lagged behind the growth of nearby Morón. In 1865 the region was officially declared a partido.

== Geography ==
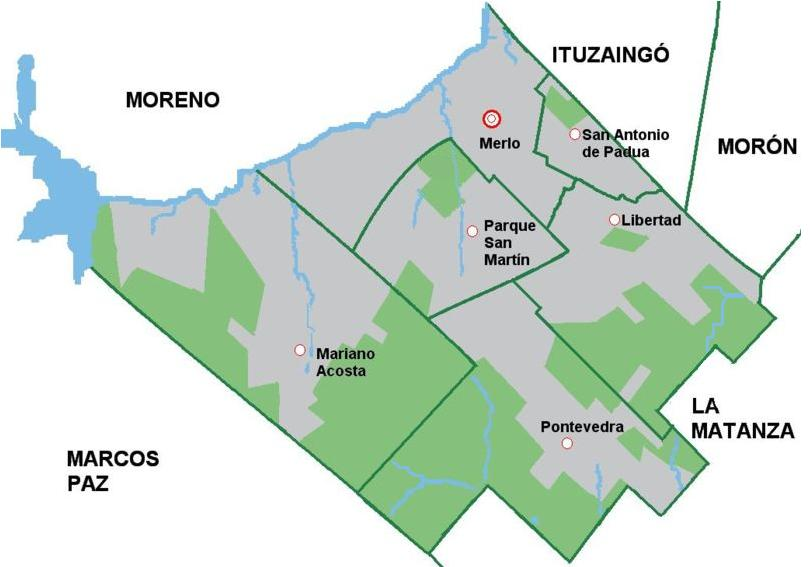
Cities: Merlo, San Antonio de Padua, Parque San Martín, Mariano Acosta, Libertad and Pontevedra

Merlo covers 170 km^{2} (66 sq mi) and is bordered by the partidos of Morón and Ituzaingó (northeast), La Matanza (southeast), Marcos Paz (southwest), and Moreno and the Reconquista River (northwest). Besides the city of Merlo, the significant localities are San Antonio de Padua, Parque San Martín, Libertad, Pontevedra and Mariano Acosta. The city of Merlo was formerly important solely as a railroad junction and trade centre for the surrounding agricultural and pastoral lands.

About half of the partido now lies within the Greater Buenos Aires urban area, and the population density is less than that of most of the metropolitan partidos of Buenos Aires Province.

== History ==
=== 1755: Francisco de Merlo and Villa San Antonio del Camino ===
In the early 17th century the present-day partido was part of the Pago (from the Latin pagus, country district) of Las Conchas; the territory was traversed by the Reconquista River, known in those days as Río de las Conchas (literally River of Shells) from where the region took its name. The region was largely inhabited by the taluhet people, part of the het nation, a hunter-gatherer society better known by the exonym querandi.

In 1636 the territory of today's Merlo was divided into a few haciendas, given as land grants by Governor Pedro Esteban Dávila to a few and influential Buenos Aires neighbors.

Inside the haciendas the main economical activities were the agriculture and cattle-raising. The fertile land —drained by Las Conchas/Reconquista River— was covered with wheat fields and orchards. The bigger hacienda was granted to the Company of Jesus and the resulting production provided the Jesuits the financial resources to maintain the schools they had in Buenos Aires.

The Jesuit priests Thomas Falkner and Florian Paucke visited the region in the mid 18th century and described the area plenty of herds of feral cattle and horses roaming free on the plains and numerous packs of dogs that feed on them and sometimes attacked the unwarned and helpless travelers.

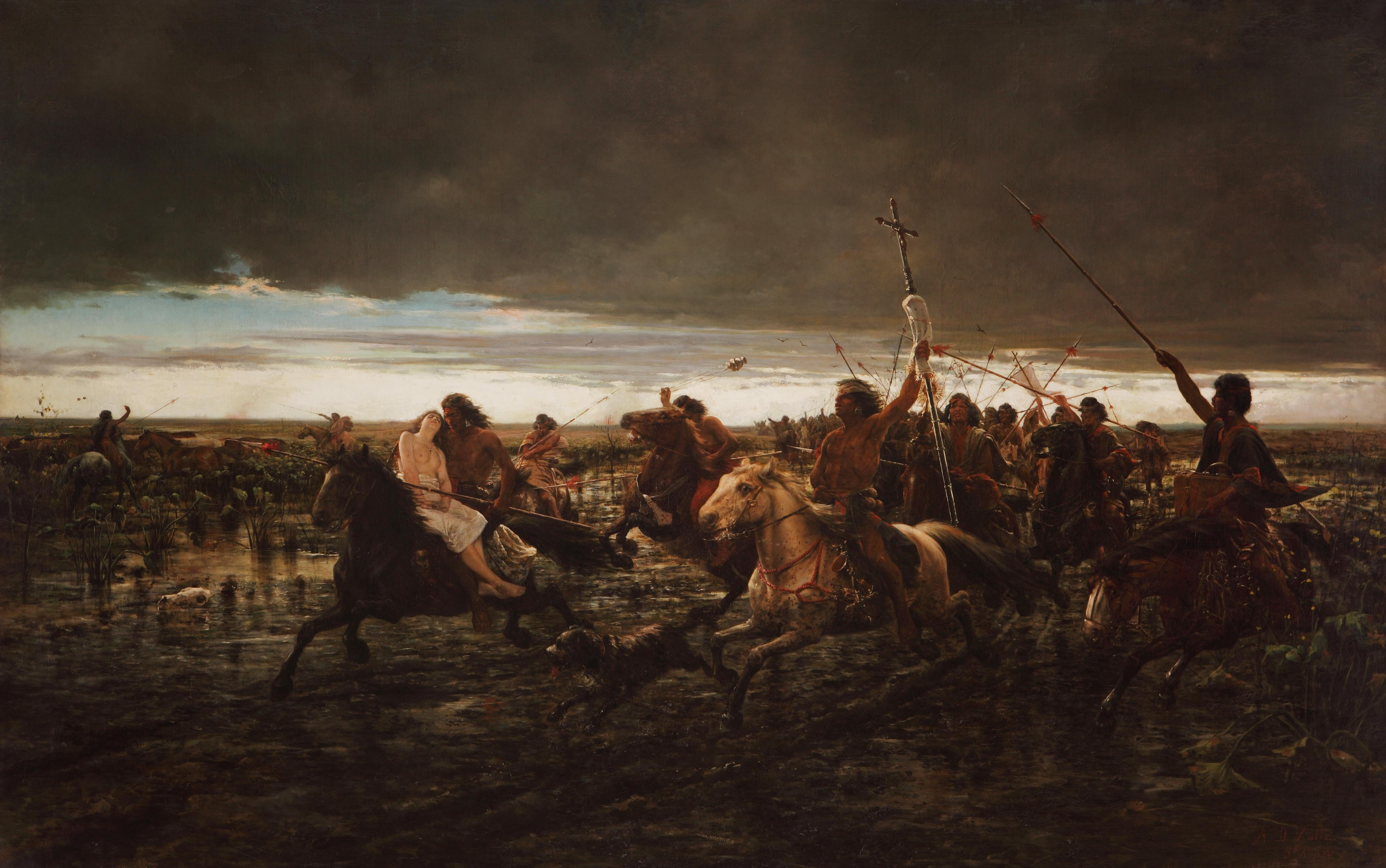
La vuelta del malón (The return of the raiders) by Ángel Della Valle (1892), Museo Nacional de Bellas Artes.

By the 18th century the Araucanian people were moving from the lap of the Andes Mountains to the Pampas, attracted by the numerous cattle and horses herds. The Araucanians looted and sacked the Spanish settlements around Buenos Aires, performing unexpected horse mounted attacks known in the Southern Cone as malones (s. malón, from Mapudungun malocán: “to make war”).

By those days the Spanish businessman Francisco de Merlo bought many lands in the region, establishing a big estancia.

The settlers scattered throughout the region took refuge around the fortified Merlo's ranch-house, starting a little hamlet in his properties. It made Merlo petitioned King Philip V of Spain authorization to found a town in his states. On October 28, 1755 Francisco de Merlo founds the town of Villa San Antonio del Camino.

After Merlo's death the town became into an out-back town, isolated from the main commercial routes, remaining within the boundaries of the estancia belonged to the Mercedarian Order, expropriated in 1821 by the State of Buenos Aires and bought in 1852 by the English businessman Thomas Gibson Pearson. After his death the estancia was managed by his stepson Juan Dillon, key figure in the history of Merlo.

=== Juan Dillon ===
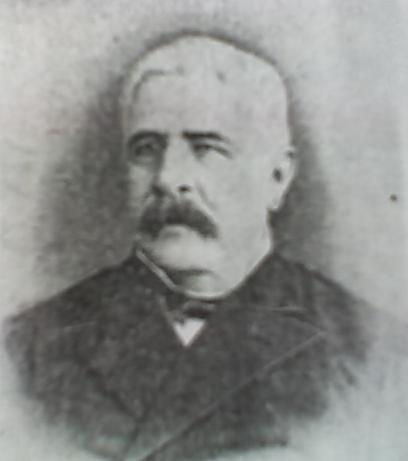
Juan Dillon, Merlo's first Mayor.

Juan Dillon y Calderón was born in Buenos Aires in 1819 and died in 1887. He was son of John Dillon, an Irish immigrant and his second wife, Manuela Calderón. Juan Dillon was a businessman, absentee landlord and public official, member of the prosperous Irish community in Buenos Aires. He married Josefa Ballesteros (b. 1824) and they had eight children. He was a prominent member of Adolfo Alsina's Autonomist Party.

John Dillon, left Ireland and emigrated to Spain. In 1807 he settled in the River Plate as a merchant and owner of a meat-curing plant. He loaned his flotilla of boats to Argentina in the war for independence with Spain. He also started the first brewery in the country. John Dillon dies in 1826 and Manuela Calderón married Thomas Gibson Pearson.

After Rosas’ fall in 1852, Juan Dillon was appointed Juez de Paz (Justice of Peace) in Morón (1855–1856) and military commander for the region. He also was elected Presidente de Municipalidad (Municipal President or Mayor) of the same district (1857; 1864–1865).

By those days Dillon took charge of his family's estate in Merlo, rebuilt the town and was appointed Juez de Paz of the newly created Partido of Merlo.

After his public life in Merlo, President Avellaneda appointed Dillon as Chief Commissioner of Immigration in 1875. During his administration Argentina experienced the first massive European immigration to the country and Dillon received the first Welsh immigrants, Volga Germans and Italians from Friuli. After that, Dillon and his family moves to La Plata when he was elected senator and served during three terms in the Buenos Aires legislature, in which he chaired the budget commission.

=== 1864: Merlo obtains its autonomy ===
In 1857 the Argentine railway company Camino de Hierro de Buenos Aires al Oeste opens the first steam locomotive public railway in Argentina and few years later the company was planning to extend the line westward to Moreno. The construction of the railway made land speculation a highly profitable activity. In order to reach Merlo the line had to pass through the land owned by the Pearson Family and Dillon saw the opportunity to make huge profits by selling out parts of the family's estate.

Dillon established in Merlo and in 1859 he commissioned the famous architect and engineer Pedro Benoit to design the layout of the town, organizing it on a rectangular grid of streets and blocks. The town was enlarged and endowed with a municipal palace, avenue, train station, school and church.

The rail station was opened on August 11, 1859.

Dillon and others businessmen and prominent neighbors such as Manuel Rodríguez, Enrique Smith and Fernando Pearson (Juan Dillon's step brother), petitioned to the Governor the erection of a new partido from the old Partido of Morón.

On October 11, 1864 the legislature of Buenos Aires sanctions the law 422 creating the Partido of Merlo. Until 1878 the new district included the today's Partido of Marcos Paz and comprehended 400 km² approx.

The election of the authorities took place in the same year and only sixty-four citizens voted; the first municipal government was integrated by Juan Dillon as Juez de Paz and Antonio Suárez, Francisco Sullivan, Fernando Pearson and Tomás Gahan as Municipales or Councilors.

Thousands of neighbors fled Buenos Aires to the countryside when a cholera epidemic first, and a yellow fever outbreak later, afflicted the city in 1867 and 1871 respectively. These events brought many Spaniard, Basque, Italian and French immigrants to Merlo, contributing with a highly qualified working force.

There was also a small British community constituted mainly by white collar workers, employed in the British railway companies. By the late 19th century many rural settlements were dispersed throughout the countryside, thriving along the rail tracks. The railway prompted the accelerated development of Merlo in the late 19th and early 20th centuries; San Antonio de Padua, Mariano Acosta, Libertad and even Merlo city grew as railway towns.

Merlo was a countryside district until the late 1940s. People from Buenos Aires spent their weekend and summer getaways in cottages, picnicking at the Reconquista riverside, playing golf at the Ituzaingó Golf Club and gliding at the Club Albatros and Club Cóndor gliding clubs. The landscape was spattered with estancias and farms.

During the first half of the 20th century the two mayor political forces in the district were the Radical Civic Union and the Conservative Party of Buenos Aires.

=== Merlo becomes part of Greater Buenos Aires ===
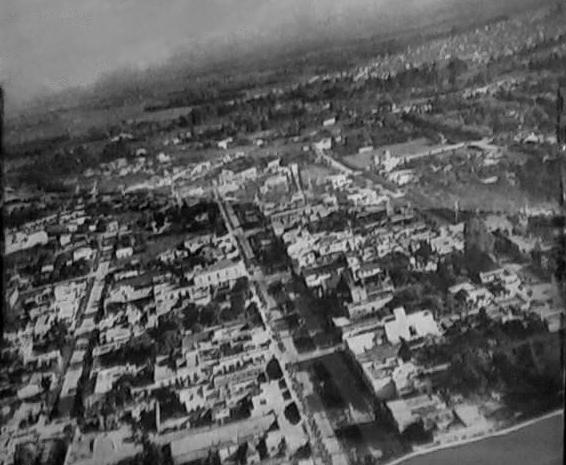
Aerial sight of Avenida Ituzaingó (present days Avenida del Libertador San Martín), Merlo city's main street, around 1950. In upper-right corner, Parque San Martín.

In the second half of the 20th century Merlo experienced an important influx of immigrants from the provinces. Between 1947 and 1960 the district quintuplicates its population, initiating a rapid process of urbanization and incorporating Merlo into the Greater Buenos Aires.

This period coincided with the rise of the Peronism in Argentina and since then the district becomes a Peronist stronghold.

== Cities ==
According to the legislation of Buenos Aires, the status of city should be declared by law. The town must have a minimal population and a determined infrastructure.

The partido has six cities.

City	Province law	Promulgated on
Merlo	5830	August 19, 1955
San Antonio de Padua	8212	September 11, 1974
Parque San Martín	8558	December 4, 1975
Libertad	10052	October 14, 1983
Mariano Acosta	10208	October 18, 1984
Pontevedra	11135	October 9, 1991

== Government ==
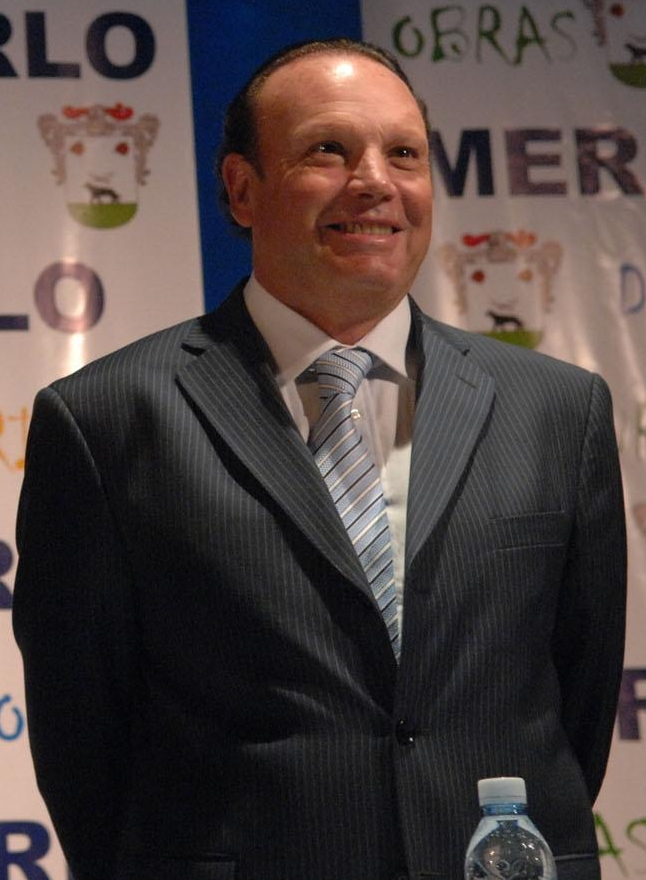
Raúl Othacehé, then-Intendant of Merlo

The Intendant until 2015 was Raúl Alfredo Othacehé, a lawyer and local peronist politician. He was elected mayor in 1991 and reelected in 1995, 1999, 2003, 2007 and 2011. In María O'Donnell's non-fiction book El Aparato (The Political Machine) an entire chapter is dedicated to Othacehé, portraying him as a corrupt politician.

The Council is controlled by the peronist party and its allies.

== Economy ==
According to the 1993 National Economic Census the manufacture industry represented 50.2% of the local economy. The transnational groups Philip Morris and Pirelli have a cigarette plant and a tire plant —respectively— in the industrial park, at the surroundings of Merlo railway station.

Wholesale and retail trade, repair of motor vehicles 10.32%; transport, storage and communication 5%; financial intermediation, real estate and renting 13.72%.

The agriculture and livestock industry only represented 0.15% of the economy. The main activities are dairy farming, market gardening (flower farming and organic vegetable farming), poultry and beekeeping, organized in small and medium enterprises (SMEs).

== Demographics ==
Partido of Merlo Population by year
1866	1,904
1869	2,469
1895	3,595
1914	6,990
1947	19,865
1960	100,146
1970	188,868
1980	292,587
1991	390,858
2001	469,985
2007	520,391

Villa San Antonio del Camino started with 101 inhabitants grouped into twelve families, most of them Spaniard and Criollo people.

At the dawn of 19th century more than fifty black African people lived in Merlo as slaves of the mercedarian friars. After his death Francisco de Merlo left five African slaves to the hospice.

Many Irish and Basque immigrants settled in Merlo around the mid 19th century, the first ones after left Ireland because of the Great Irish Famine and British oppression, and the second ones fleeing from Spain's Carlist Wars. Both communities lived basically in the surrounding estancias; the Irish-Argentine community integrated Merlo's ruling class and four of the five members of the first municipal government belonged to this national affiliation. The Basques worked basically as dairy farmers.

More than half of the population can trace its origins from the Italian and Spaniard immigrants that arrived to Merlo from the late 19th century and continued well into the 20th century.

By the mid 20th century many market gardens were run by members of the Japanese and Portuguese communities.

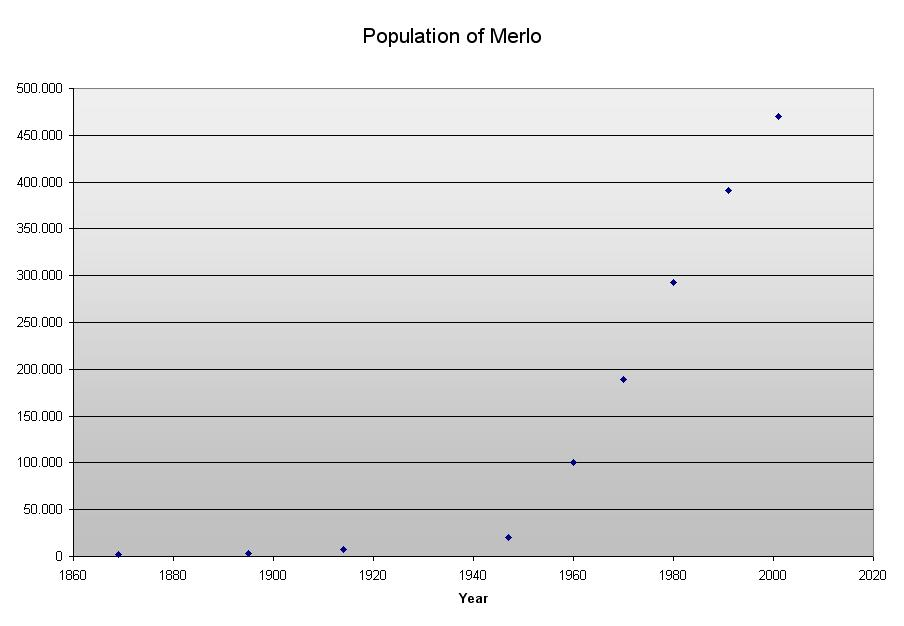
Population growth since 1869.

Looking for better jobs and well-paid salaries, people from the provinces and neighbor countries started to settle in Merlo in the late 1940s and 1950s. These people are from mestizo ascendancy and constitute - at the present days- the principal ethnic group in Merlo.

By the same time many Polish families arrived to Merlo at the end of World War II.

In the present days −and as a curious note− many supermarkets in the district are run by Chinese people.

=== Demographic data ===
Population: 469,985 (2001 census)
Median age:
total: 29.6 years
male: 28.7 years
female: 30.4 years

Urbanized Population: 99.7% (2001)

Population by origin: (2001)
born in Buenos Aires Province: 60.2%
born in the rest of Argentina: 34.6%
foreign-born population: 5.74%

Total fertility rate: 2.1 children born/woman (2001)

Literacy:
definition: age 10 and over can read and write (2001)
total population: 98.19%
male: 98.27%
female: 98.11%

Educational level: (population 15 years and more, 2001)
Population that never attended school: 3.97%

Education Level	Incomplete	Complete
Primary Education	14.07%	36.23%
Secondary Education	24.27%	13.24%
Higher non-university	1.89%	2.48%
University	2.71%	1.13%

Basic needs poverty rate: 23.4% (2001)

Dependency ratio: (2001)
total: 60.1%
population under 15 years: 48.9%
population over 65 years: 11.1%

Crime rate: 188 per 10,000 inhabitants (2005)

== Public services ==
According 2001 National Census 95.22% of the population had access to the electric grid and only 55.2% had access to pipeline-supplied gas. The water supply and sanitation conditions were appalling: 49.54% of the population was supplied with potable water and only 21.85% was connected to the public sewerage system.

== Internet connection ==
In 2001 only 4.14% of the homes were connected to Internet.

== Transport ==
The principal arterial road is the Rivadavia Avenue which was known in the colonial times as the Camino Real del Oeste or the Western Royal Road. Throughout the partido its name changes to Presidente Perón Avenue. The journey to Buenos Aires downtown takes one and a half hours by bus. The head town connects with the Acceso Oeste Highway by an alternate route, such as the Camino de la ribera which crosses along the Reconquista River.

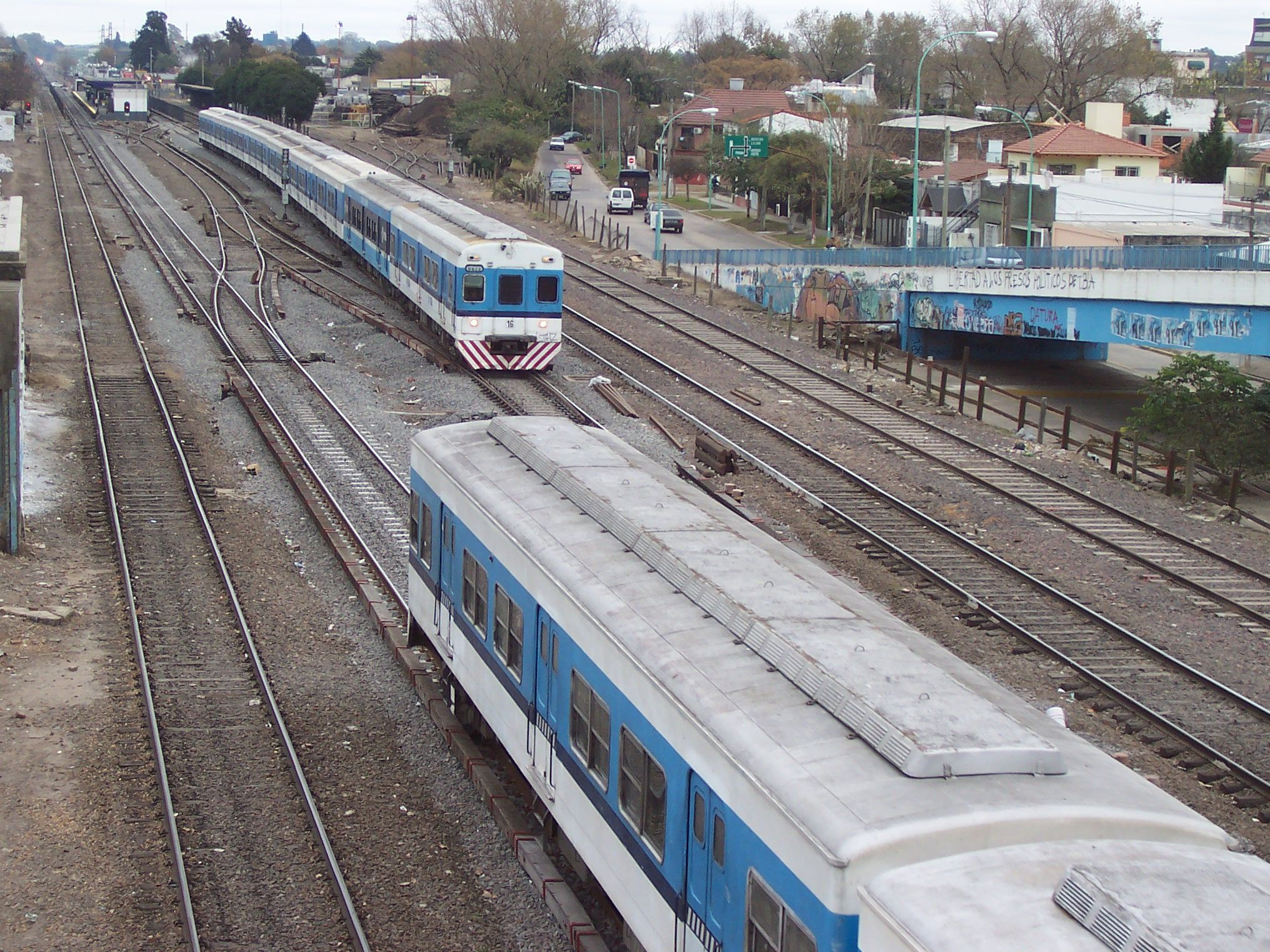
Estación Merlo, Merlo Railway Station, Merlo city.

The Sarmiento Railway Line runs alongside the Rivadavia Avenue and transports the vast majority of commuters to and from Buenos Aires.

The Sarmiento line is managed by Trenes de Buenos Aires (TBA). The mainline has two railway stations in the partido: Merlo and San Antonio de Padua. The journey takes 45 minutes to Estación Once in Buenos Aires. The line uses electric locomotives which are powered by electricity picked up from third rails. Merlo is the railway terminal station of a branch line that ends at Lobos city. Its trains are powered by diesel engines, known as diesel locomotives.

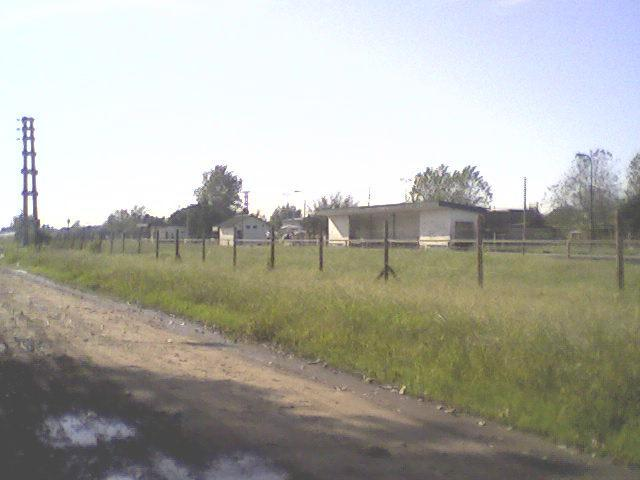
Estación Marinos del Crucero Belgrano, Belgrano Sur line, Pontevedra, Merlo.

The Belgrano Sur line, formerly the Buenos Aires Midland Railway, is used by a reduced number of people. It is commonly known as the “death’s train” and it stretches from Buenos Aires to the outskirts of the partido. The line is managed by Transportes Metropolitanos it had not received investments in the past years and its trains and stations are practically abandoned. The petty robberies, rapes and assassinations are very commonly in this line. Its trains are powered by diesel engines.

== Sports ==
=== Sport Clubs ===
- Club Atlético San Antonio de Padua
- Club Atlético Ferrocarril Midland
- Club Atlético Argentino de Merlo
- Club Social y Deportivo Merlo
- Club Ferrocarril Oeste de Merlo

=== Golf Clubs ===
- Ituzaingó Golf Club
- Libertad Golf Club

=== Auto Racing Tracks ===
- Circuito Ciudad de Merlo

== Hydrography ==
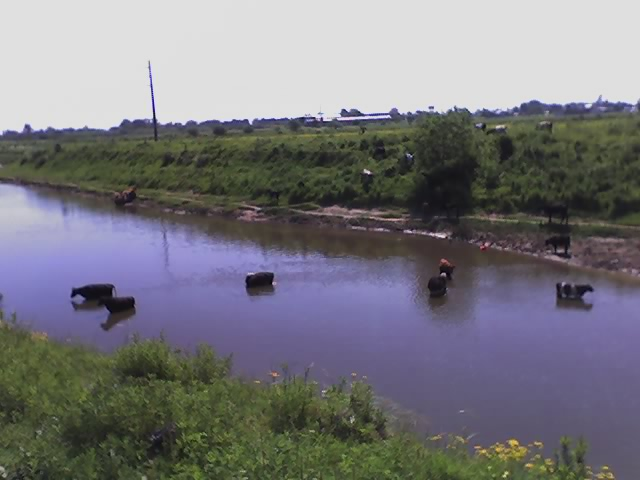
Upper Reconquista River.

Merlo's creeks are both tributaries Reconquista and Matanza Rivers. The 54% of the territory belongs to the Reconquista drainage basin and the following creeks or arroyos drain in the Reconquista River: Arroyo Gómez, Cañada de Smith, Arroyo Torres and Arroyo de La Cañada del Molino; the following creeks drain in the Matanza River: Arroyo Saladero, Aroyo de Las Víboras, Arroyo del Pantano Grande, Cañada del Bajo Hondo and Cañada 11 de Octubre. Most of those water courses are highly contaminated. The Reconquista floods were recurrent in the past, the biggest in recent years were in 1985 and 2000; these ones affected to the poorest population, established at its riverside.

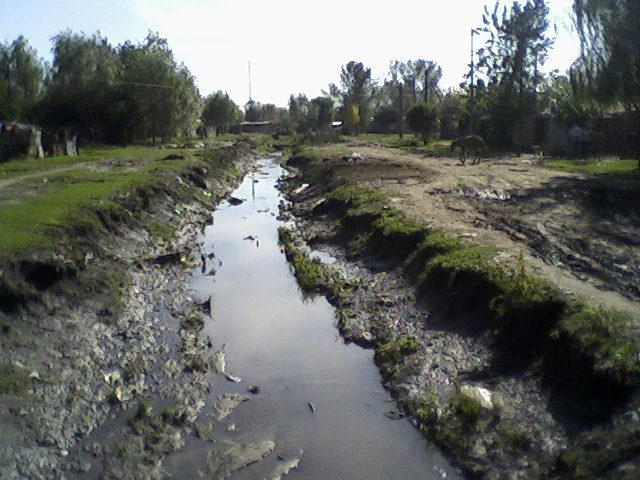
Arroyo Torres, (Torres Creek), Parque San Martín, Merlo. It is a highly contaminated water course, tributary of the Reconquista River.
