= Pontevedra, Buenos Aires =

City in Buenos Aires Province, Argentina

Pontevedra
- City
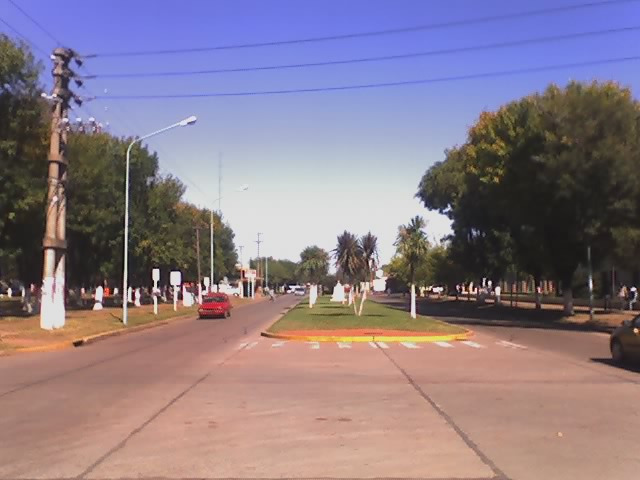

- Coat of arms

- Location in Greater Buenos Aires
- Coordinates: 34°45′S 58°42′W
- Country: Argentina
- Province: Buenos Aires
- Partido: Merlo
- Founded: 1871
- Elevation: 17 m (56 ft)

Population (2001 census [INDEC])
  - Total: 33,515
- CPA Base: B 1761
- Area code: +54 220

Pontevedra is a city located in Merlo Partido, Buenos Aires Province, Argentina. The town was named after the homonymous city of Pontevedra, Spain.

Pontevedra was founded in 1871 by real estate promoters, in the estates belonging to the Irish landlord Thomas Gahan, member of Merlo's first municipal government in 1865.

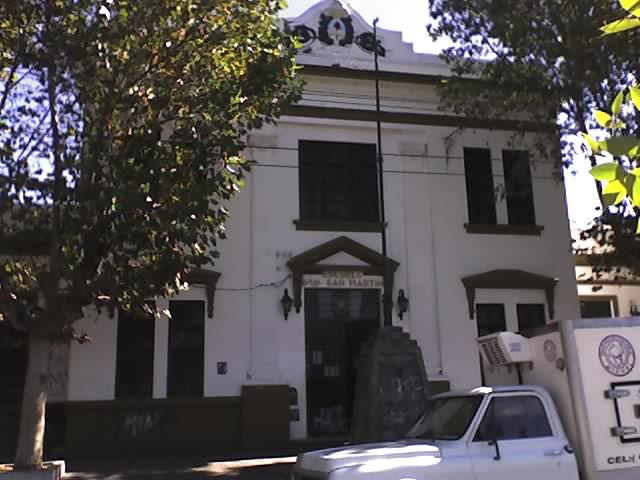
First school in Pontevedra, opened in the last decade of 19th century.

Pontevedra is a small town surrounded by small truck farms, connected to Merlo, Libertad and González Catán .

The city is bordered by Parque San Martín and Libertad (north), Mariano Acosta (west), González Catán (east) and Veinte de Junio (south), both in La Matanza Partido, and Marcos Paz (south).

According to the 2001 census [INDEC], the population was 33,515.

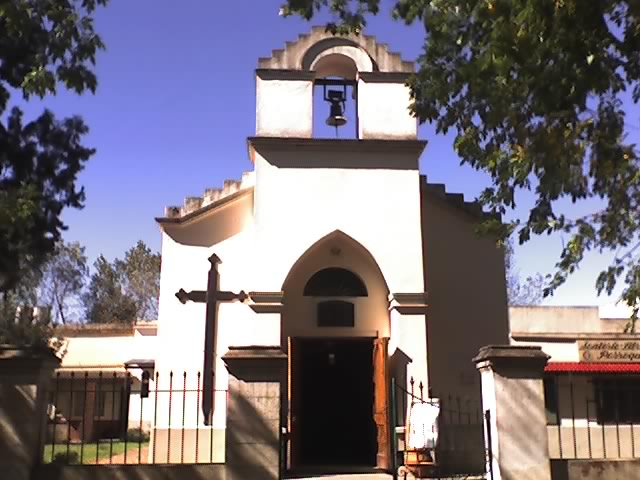
Church dedicated to the Immaculate Conception, city of Pontevedra.
