= Mariano Acosta, Buenos Aires =

Mariano Acosta
- City
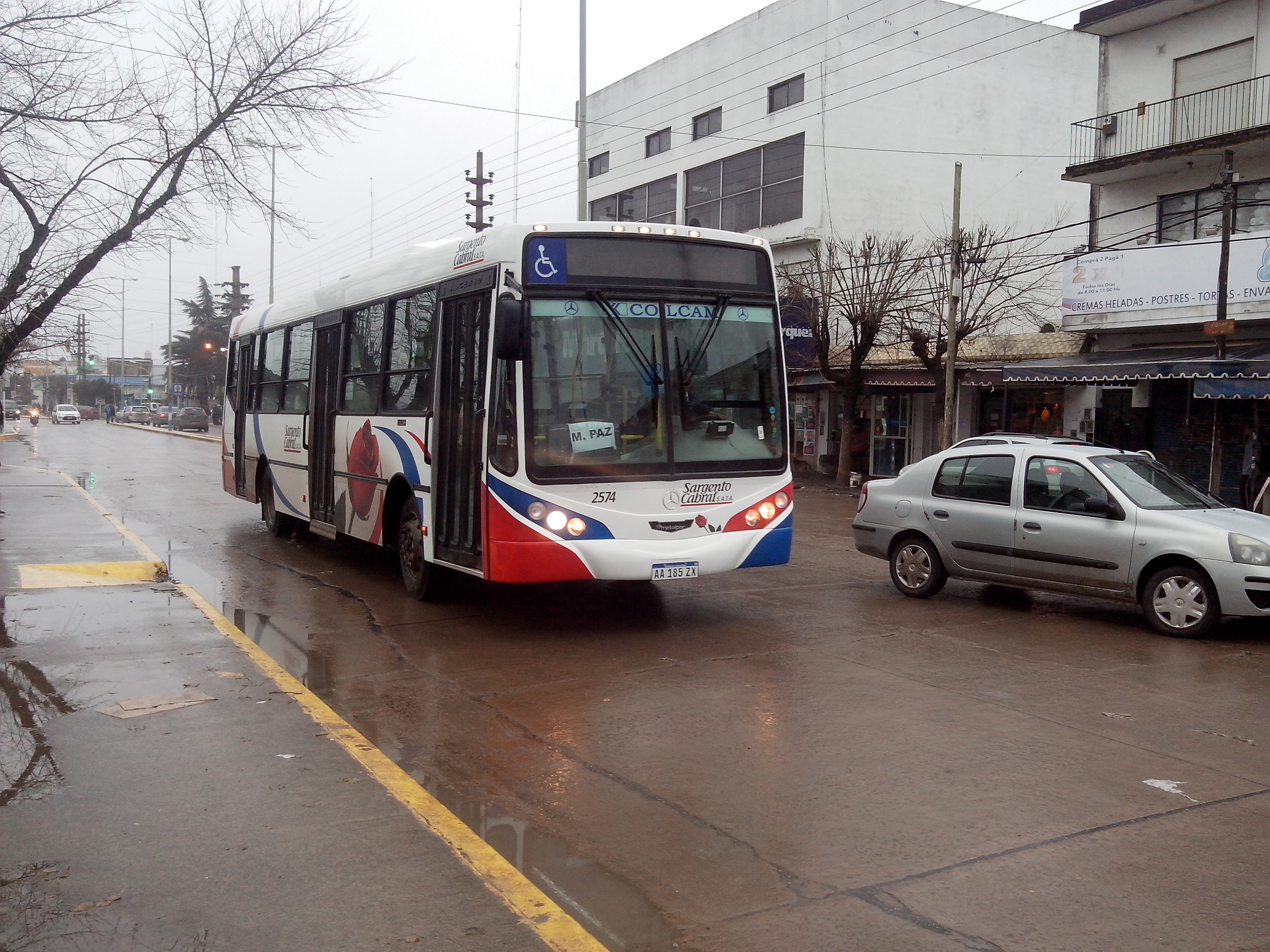

- Location in Greater Buenos Aires
- Coordinates: 34°43′S 58°47′W
- Country: Argentina
- Province: Buenos Aires
- Partido: Merlo
- Elevation: 22 m (72 ft)

Population (2001 census [INDEC])
  - Total: 54,081
- CPA Base: B 1722
- Area code: +54 220

Mariano Acosta is a city located in Merlo Partido, Buenos Aires Province, Argentina. Mariano Acosta was founded by the landholder and businessman Juan Posse in the earliest 20th century, and for years the town was known as Villa (village) Posse. Villa Posse changed its name to Mariano Acosta when the British-owned railway company Buenos Aires Western Railway Co. opens a railway station at its surroundings in 1910. The station was named after Mariano Acosta (1825-1893), Argentine lawyer and politician, former Vice-President of Argentina and governor of Buenos Aires.

Mariano Acosta is bordered by Moreno and the Reconquista River (west), Parque San Martín and other localidades of Merlo (north), Pontevedra (northeast) and Marcos Paz (south).

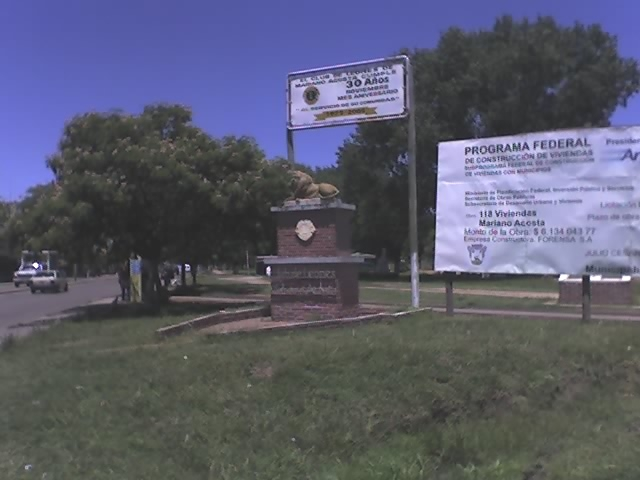
Lions' Club monument in Merlo

According to the 2001 census [INDEC], the population was 54,081.
