= Ioshua =

Argentinian punk poet

- Born: 1977 Haedo, Buenos Aires, Argentina
- Died: 25 June 2015 (aged 37–38) Mariano Acosta, Buenos Aires, Argentina
- Language: Spanish
- Genre: punk poetry comics
- Notable works: Pija, birra, faso

Josué Marcos Belmonte (1977 – 25 June 2015), better known by the stage name Ioshua, was an Argentine punk poet, cartoonist and LGBT activist. He was known for being a non-conformist and irreverent character and he defined representation in literature for marginalized classes of Greater Buenos Aires. Besides writing, he ventured in musical composition and comics.

One of the principal themes of his work is the representation of the homosexual desire in the marginalized neighborhoods of Greater Buenos Aires.

== Biography ==
Born in 1977 in Haedo, Buenos Aires province, although at a young age he moved with his family to Libertad, Merlo. He suffered domestic violence at the hands of his father, who hit him at the age of 6 and broke his spine. Years later, during another attack, his father broke his glottis. A little later, Ioshua's mother died and he ran way from home at 14 years old.

He started his artistic career at the start of the 2000s, by writing fanzines and as a member and composer of the band Corazondeniñx. In 2005 he had his first publication in a publishing house, the plaquette Para los pibes, that was released by the publishing house Belleza y Felicidad, by the artists Fernanda Laguna and Cecilia Pavón, who also had an art gallery in which Ioshua had performed.

His first book of poetry, Pija, birra, faso, was published in 2009 by the publishing house Nulú Bonsai. According to the author, he chose this name for the work because of his desire to renew the contemporary literature in Argentina and feel the reality of gay and mestizo men represented in the literature, as a reference to the movie Pizza, birra, faso (1998) and to have his character as a representative film of New Argentine Cinema.

Pija, birra, faso was followed by works like Loma hermosa (2009), En la noche (2010), Malincho (2012) and Campeón (2013). His other works featured the cartoon Cumbia Gei, about a group of antisocial, gay youths.

At the beginning of 2014, Ioshua announced to his editors at Nulú Bonsai his intention to abandon writing and dedicate himself to only drawing. His editors proposed publishing a book with his completed works, for which Ioshua wrote a prologue and asked that the cover will show a golden penis. The book was in preparation at the time of his death, so it ended being a posthumous publication with title Todas las obras acabadas (All the finished works).

Ioshua died on 25 June 2015 in his home, located in the city of Mariano Acosta. At the time of his death, he had blood cancer and continued irregular treatment for the HIV with which he had been diagnosed. His body was recognized by his friends and the autopsy revealed that his death was caused by respiratory failure, pneumonia and anemia.

== Works ==
Among his works are:

- Para los pibe (2008). Ediciones Belleza y Felicidad
- Pija, birra, faso (2009)
- Loma hermosa (2009)
- Cumbia Gay (2009). Editorial Colección Chapita.
- Clasismo Homo. Política de géneros, identidad y revolución (2010)
- En la noche (2010)
- Una señal blanca (2010)
- Malincho (2012)
- Las penas del maricón (2012)
- Campeón (2013)
- El violeta es el color del odio (2013)
- Para vos wachín, ya no va a doler (2024)
