= Paso del Rey =

- City
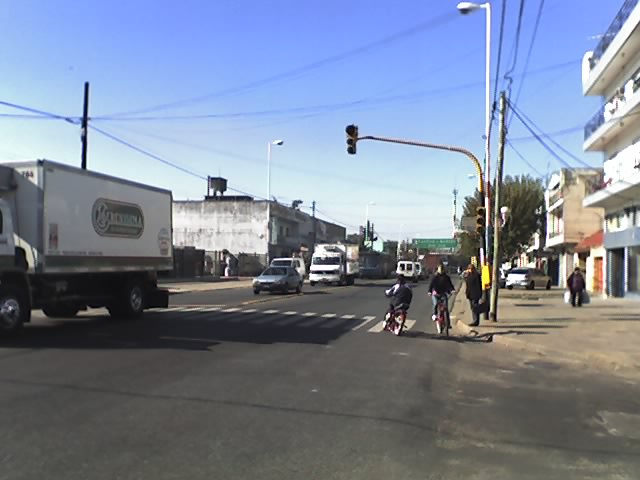
- Mitre Avenue

- Location in Greater Buenos Aires
- Coordinates: 34°39′S 58°45′W
- Country: Argentina
- Province: Buenos Aires
- Partido: Moreno
- Elevation: 12 m (39 ft)

Population (2001 census [INDEC])
  - Total: 41,775
- CPA Base: B 1742
- Area code: 54 0237

Paso del Rey is a city located 35.5 km west of Buenos Aires, in Moreno, Buenos Aires Province, Argentina.

Paso del Rey (King's Ford) takes its name from the estancia (ranch) owned by Senator Amancio Jacinto Alcorta: Estancia Paso del Rey.

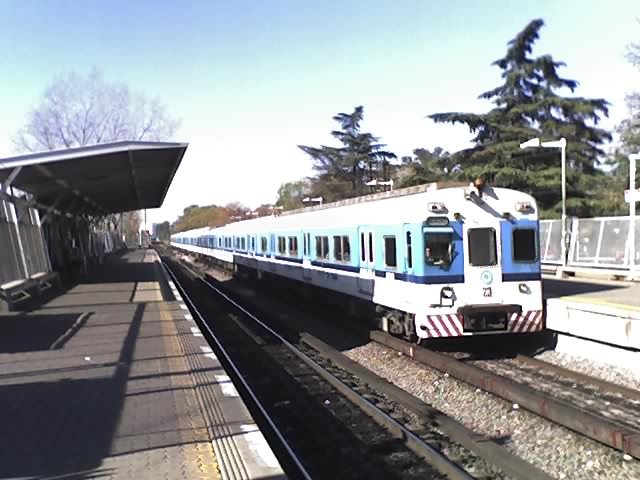
Railway Station, opened in 1938.

The surrounding area was well-known since colonial times because there was a ford which provided a useful crossing place to get the west bank of the Reconquista River. In fact, Charles Darwin could have crossed the ford in his journey from Buenos Aires to Luján on 27 September 1833 (the only alternative crossing was a wooden bridge known as Puente de Márquez, 4.5 km north).

According to the 2001 census [INDEC], the population was 41,775.

Paso del Rey is bordered by Moreno City (west), Trujui (north) and Merlo and Reconquista River (south).

== History ==
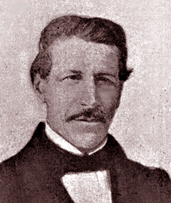
Amancio Jacinto Alcorta (1805–62), Argentine politician, composer and owner of Estancia Paso del Rey.

The origin of the city goes back to 1938 when the British-owned railway company Buenos Aires Western Railway Co. opens a railway stop between the railway stations of Moreno and Merlo; it was thanks to the efforts of the textile businessman Amadeo Regules.
