= Veinte de Junio =

- Coat of arms

- Location in Greater Buenos Aires
- Coordinates: 34°46′S 58°43′W
- Country: Argentina
- Province: Buenos Aires
- Partido: La Matanza
- Elevation: 23 m (75 ft)

Population (2001 census [INDEC])
  - Total: 828
  - Density: 57/km^{2} (150/sq mi)
- CPA Base: B 1761
- Area code: +54 0220

Veinte de Junio is a town located 35 km from Buenos Aires, in La Matanza, Buenos Aires Province, Argentina.

Veinte de Junio is an outback sleepy rural town, relatively isolated from the rest of the Greater Buenos Aires.

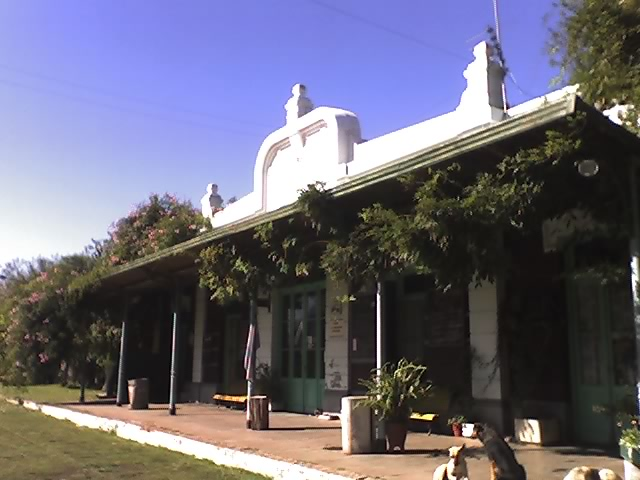
Estación 20 de Junio, Veinte de Junio's railway station, closed since 1993.

The town and railway station, Estación 20 de Junio, were named after Argentina’s National Flag Day: June 20.

According to the 2001 census [INDEC], the population was 828.

The town is bordered by Pontevedra (north), González Catán (east), Marcos Paz (southwest) and Virrey del Pino (southeast).

Alejo Castex is the only paved street and it is lined with tall trees and weekend-houses; It is home to many bird species, such us: rufous-bellied thrushes, chalk-browed mockingbirds, rufous horneros and the far-away roar of tractors working on the farms.

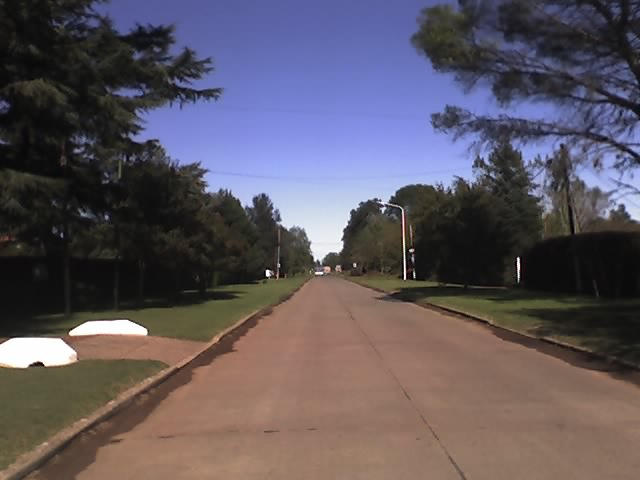
Alejo Castex street.

Veinte de Junio only has a general store, a kindergarten, and a primary and secondary public school; for almost everything the town depends from the nearby city of Pontevedra, in Merlo Partido. For many residents the isolation is the cause of the lack of development of the town; for many others it’s a blessing because the remoteness makes Veinte de Junio a safe place to live, a place where crime and delinquency are very rare.

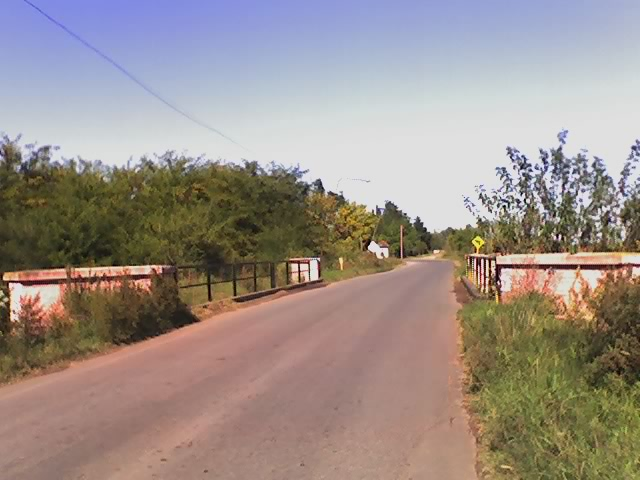
Bridge at the entrance of Veinte de Junio.

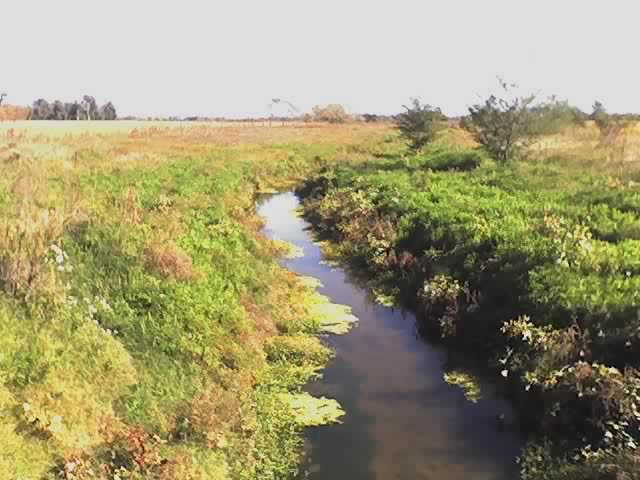
Arroyo de la Cañada Pantanosa.

The town grew around a railway station built in the first decade of the 20th century by the French–owned company Compagnie Générale de Chemins de Fer dans la Province de Buenos Aires, 4 km from Pontevedra. In fact, by those days the station was known as Estación Pontevedra. The land around the station was urbanized forty years later, in 1947, and it was known as Parque Ibáñez–Estación Pontevedra, but its name changed in 1949 when the partidos boundaries of Merlo and La Matanza were established. The railway station was left within the jurisdiction of La Matanza, while Pontevedra then came within the jurisdiction of Merlo.

During Carlos Menem’s administration, the state-run railway system was privatized and thousands of kilometers of tracks were closed; Estación 20 de Junio was closed on March 13, 1993.

The train station seems to be frozen in time; during the weekends, groups of bikers spend leisure time in bicycle touring, following the dead rail tracks, and it is very common to see them stopping by Estación 20 de Junio.

The residents, organized in a non-government association, had been working in order to reestablished the train service between González Catán and Veinte de Junio.

At the entrance of the town a narrow creek flows slowly meandering through the farms; the creek is called Arroyo de la Cañada Pantanosa. The creek drains to La Matanza River and during springtime the countryside blooms with wild flowers alongside the creek, evoking bucolic scenes.

== Population ==
In 1991 the population of Veinte de Junio was 102 and ten years later it grew to 828.

According to the Provincial Office of Statistics, the figures for 2001 are as follow:

- The percentage of households with unsatisfied basic needs was 13.83%.
- The literacy rate was 97.61%.
- People in Veinte de Junio obtain water from wells, pumps and rainwater tanks and the percentage of households with water supplied by pipe was 1.19%; there is no sewerage system.

== Images of Estación 20 de Junio ==
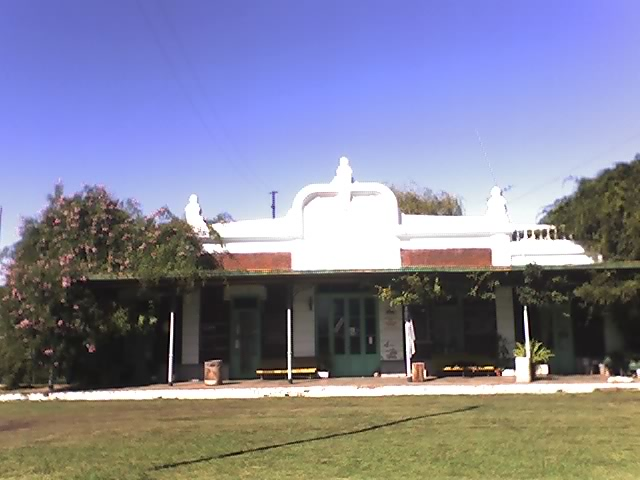

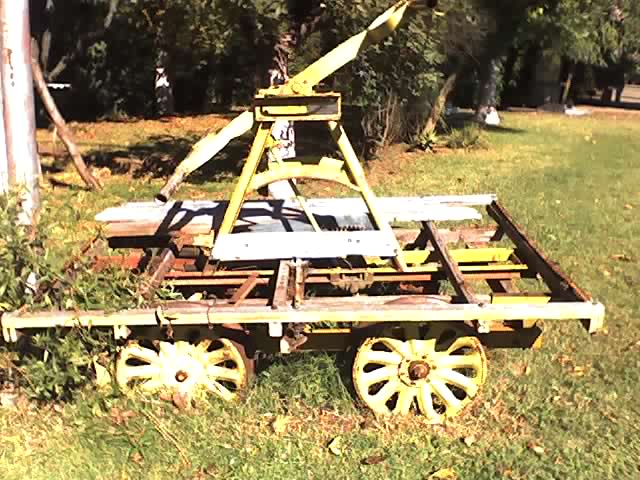

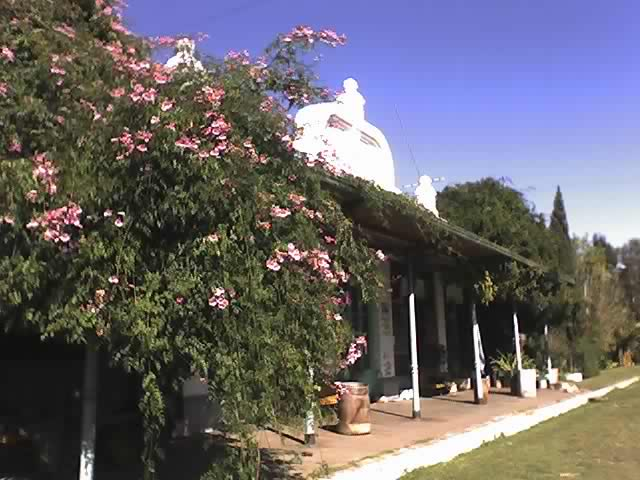

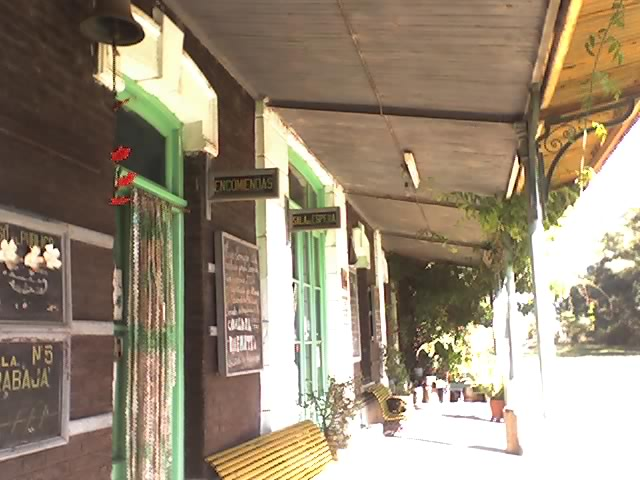

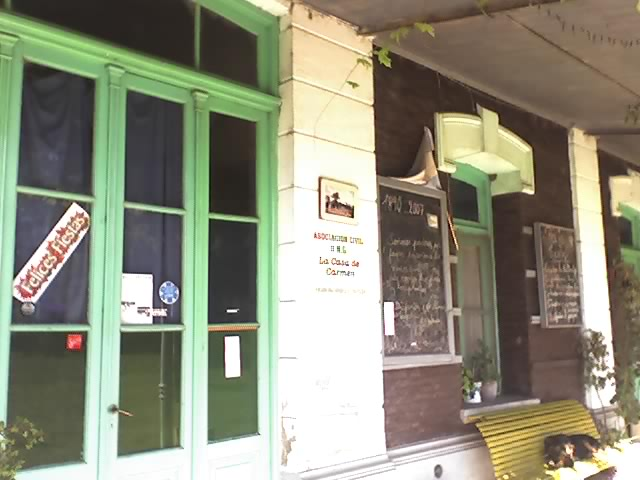

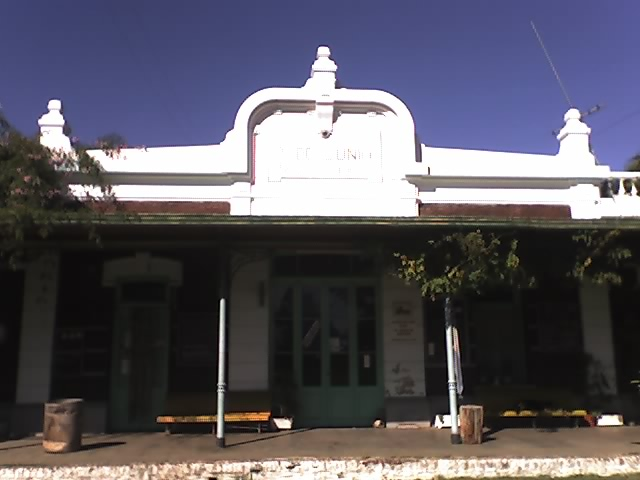

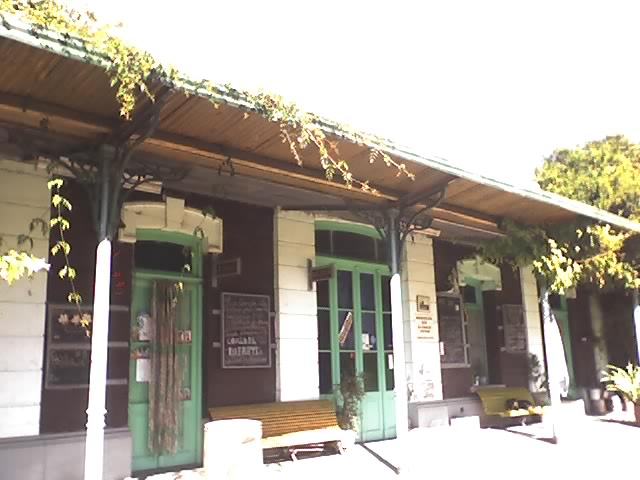

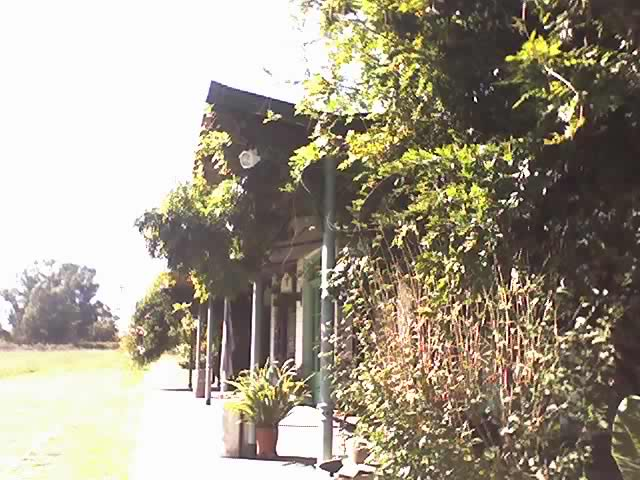
