= Alcorta (surname) =

Alcorta is a surname of Basque origin. Notable people with the surname include:

- Amancio Alcorta (1842–1902), Argentine legal theorist, politician and diplomat
- Amancio Jacinto Alcorta (1805–1862), Argentine composer, policy maker and politician
- Casimiro Alcorta (1840–1913), Argentine musician
- Gloria Alcorta (1918–2012), Argentine writer, poet and sculptor
- Ignacio Alcorta (born 1937), Spanish rower
- José Figueroa Alcorta (1860–1931), Argentine politician
- Lourdes Alcorta (born 1951), Peruvian author, social communicator and politician

== See also ==
- Alkorta (surname)
