= Raúl Othacehé =

Argentine politician (born 1946)

Raúl Alfredo Othacehé
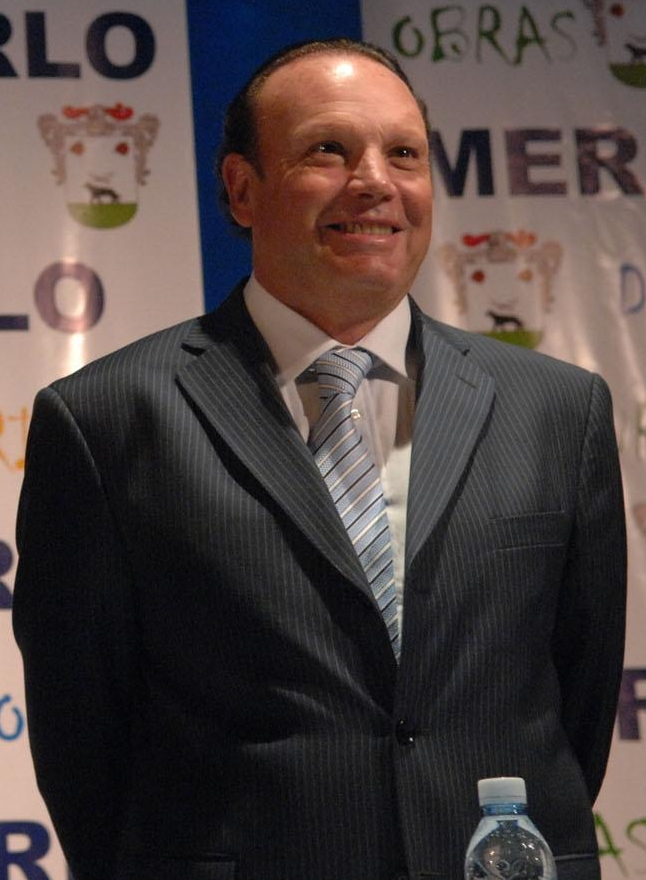

Mayor of Merlo, Buenos Aires
- In office 1995–1999; 1999–2003; 2003–2007; 2007–2010

Minister of Government (Home Affairs)
- In office December 1999 – January 2002

Personal details
- Born: February 9, 1946 (age 80) Buenos Aires
- Spouse: Mónica Susana Arnaldi
- Children: Four
- Education: University of Buenos Aires
- Profession: Lawyer

Raúl Alfredo Othacehé (born February 9, 1946) is an Argentine politician, lawyer, and former Mayor of Merlo, Province of Buenos Aires. He is known by his nickname "el Vasco" (Spanish: "the Basque") because of his Basque ancestry.

== Life ==
Othacehé was born in Buenos Aires. When he was four, his family moved to San Antonio de Padua, Merlo. His father and grandfather were railway workers. He was raised as devout Catholic and fervent Peronist.

In 1975 he married Mónica Susana Arnaldi; they have four sons.

== Political career ==
Othacehé attended the University of Buenos Aires, and graduated as a criminal defense lawyer in 1973.

In 1984, Othacehé was offered an appointment as a judge, but he declined. In 1987 he was elected to the Chamber of Deputies of Buenos Aires Province.

Othacehé was first elected mayor of Merlo in 1991, winning more than 50 percent of the vote. He has been re-elected four times: in 1995, 1999, 2003, and 2007.

In 1999 Othacehé ran for Governor, but Eduardo Duhalde persuaded him to renounce his candidacy in favor of Carlos Ruckauf.

In December 1999, Othacehé was appointed as Minister of Government (Home Affairs) by Governor Ruckauf. In January 2002, he resigned and resumed his role as mayor of Merlo.

In 2008, Othacehé was named among a list of long-term Argentine politicians referred to as "barons of the conurbation" (barones del conurbano), who have been compared to the Sicilian Mafia.

In 2016, Pope Francis, in a dialogue with the current mayor of Merlo, Gustavo Menéndez, said he himself had suffered from attacks by Othacehé when he was Archbishop of Buenos Aires.
