= Estadio del Argentino de Merlo =

Football stadium in Merlo, Argentina

Coordinates: 34.646087°S 58.730976°W

- Interactive map of Estadio del Argentino de Merlo
- Location: Merlo, Greater Buenos Aires
- Capacity: 11000

Construction
- Opened: October 1980

Tenant
- Argentino de Merlo

Estadio del Argentino de Merlo is a stadium in Merlo, Buenos Aires. It is used for football matches and is the home stadium of Argentino de Merlo.
