= Moreno, Buenos Aires =

City in Buenos Aires Province, Argentina

Moreno
- City
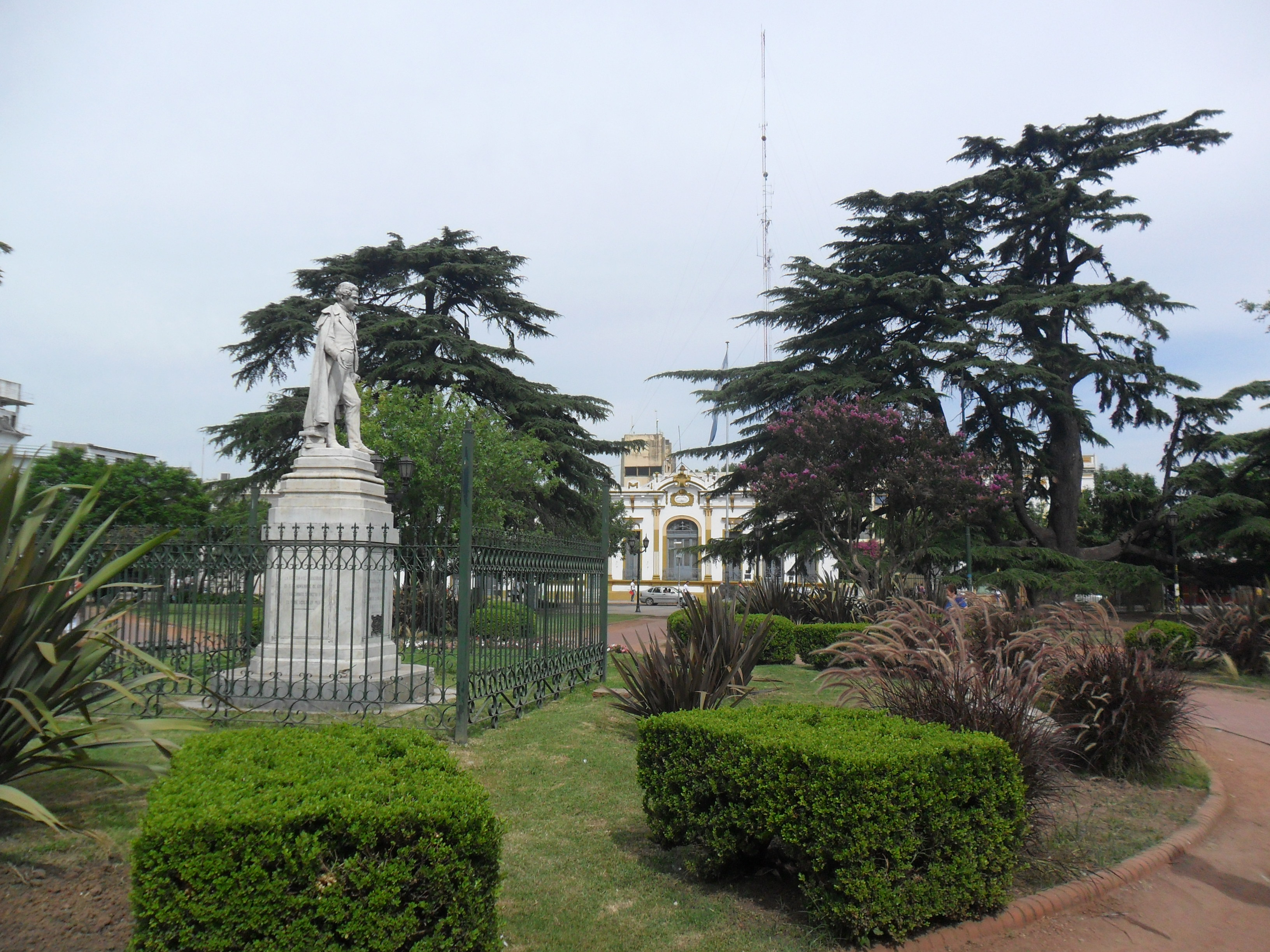

- Location in Greater Buenos Aires
- Coordinates: 34°39′S 58°47′W
- Country: Argentina
- Province: Buenos Aires
- Partido: Moreno
- Founded: October 25, 1864
- Elevation: 14 m (46 ft)

Population (2001 census [INDEC])
  - Total: 148,290
- CPA Base: B 1744
- Area code: +54 237

Moreno is a city in Buenos Aires Province, Argentina. It is the head town of Moreno Partido. It forms part of the Greater Buenos Aires urban conurbation and is located around 36 km (22 mi) to the west of the autonomous city of Buenos Aires.

According to the 2001 census [INDEC], the population was 148,290.

Moreno is bordered by Paso del Rey (east), Trujui and Cuartel V (north), Francisco Álvarez (west) and Merlo and Reconquista River (south).

== History ==
The origin of the city goes back to 1860 when the Argentine railway company Camino de Hierro de Buenos Aires al Oeste opened a railway station on land donated by politician and composer, Amancio Jacinto Alcorta.

== Education ==
The area has a German school, Deutsche Schule Moreno, as well as other private schools such as Colegio Juan XXIII, and Instituto Corazón de Jesús.

For higher education, there is the Universidad Nacional de Moreno, where students can enroll in careers related to Applied Sciences and Technology, Economic Sciences and Law, and Humanities and Social Sciences.

== Notable residents ==
- Hebe Uhart (born 1936), writer and professor

== Gallery ==
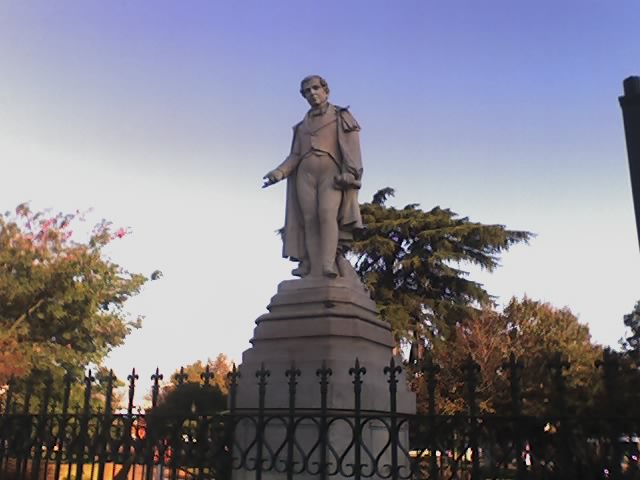
Statue of Mariano Moreno (1778-1811), Argentine politician from whom the city takes its name

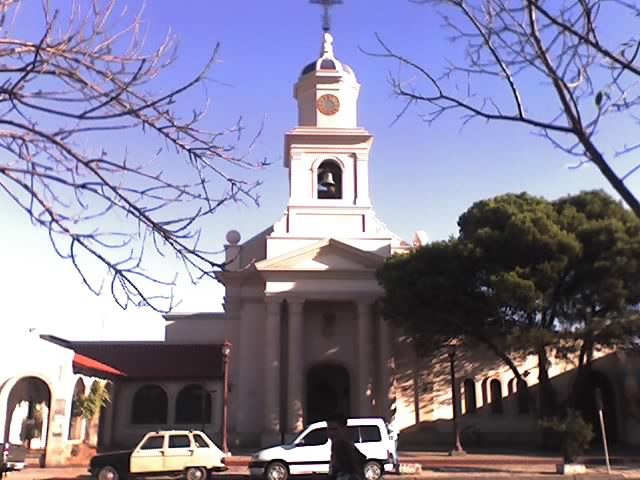
Catedral Nuestra Señora del Rosario (Our Lady of the Rosary Cathedral), seat of the Diocese of Merlo-Moreno

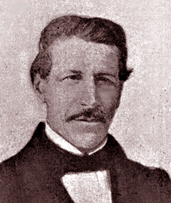
Amancio Jacinto Alcorta (1805-1862), owner of Estancia Paso del Rey
