= Marcos Paz, Buenos Aires =

Marcos Paz
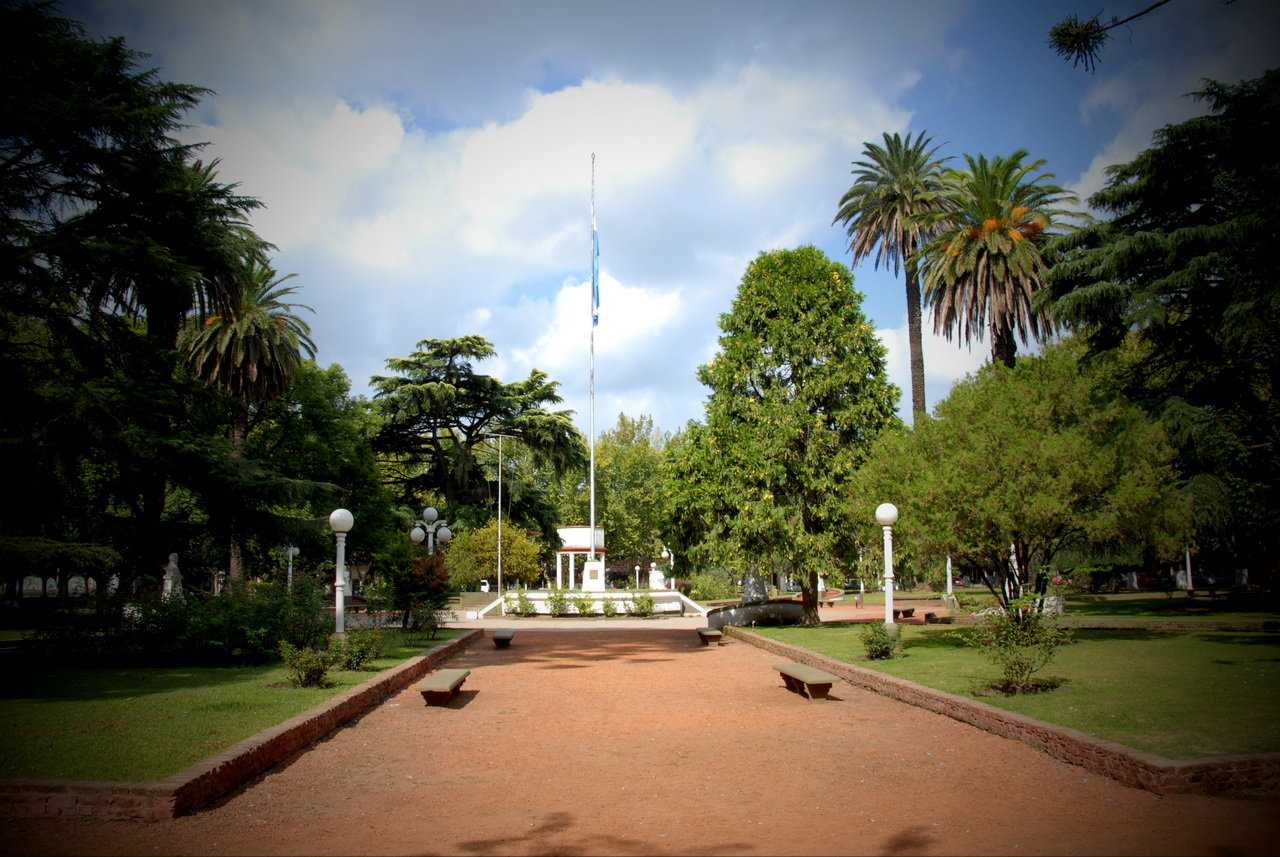

- Location in Greater Buenos Aires
- Coordinates: 34°46′S 58°50′W
- Country: Argentina
- Province: Buenos Aires
- Partido: Marcos Paz
- Founded: 1878
- Elevation: 26 m (85 ft)

Population (2001 census [INDEC])
  - Total: 39,151
- CPA Base: B 1727
- Area code: +54 220

Marcos Paz is the capital of Marcos Paz Partido, in the Greater Buenos Aires urban agglomeration in the Argentine province of Buenos Aires, located 48 kilometres west of Buenos Aires.

Although the city of Marcos Paz was officially founded in 1878, the city was first established in 1870, near the Estación Coronel Doctor Marcos Paz railway station. With a population of 39.529 (INDEC 2001), it is the county's largest (and only) city.

== Notable residents ==
- Juan Carlos Onganía Carballo (1914–1995), military dictator and President of Argentina from 29 June 1966 to 8 June 1970.
- Jorge Rafael Videla (1925–2013), military dictator and President of Argentina from 29 March 1976 to 29 March 1981.
- Rodolfo Arruabarrena, football player, coach
- Braian Toledo, Olympic javelinist
