= Merlo, Buenos Aires =

Merlo
- City
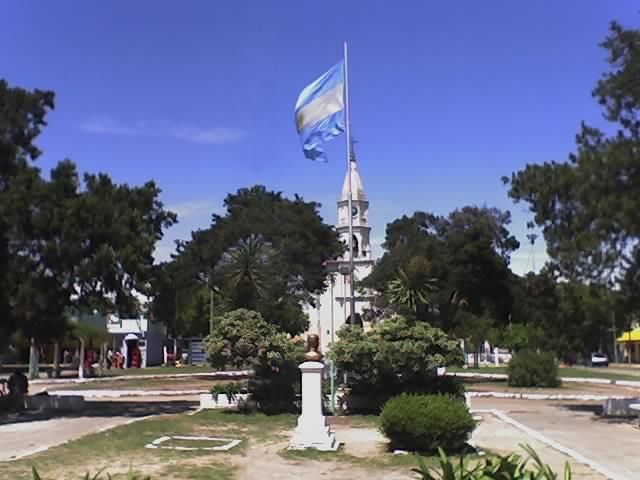

- Location in Greater Buenos Aires
- Coordinates: 34°39′S 58°43′W
- Country: Argentina
- Province: Buenos Aires
- Partido: Merlo
- Founded: August 28, 1755
- Elevation: 16 m (52 ft)

Population (2001 census [INDEC])
  - Total: 244,168
- CPA Base: B 1722
- Area code: +54 220

Merlo is the head city of the eponymous partido of Merlo and seat of the municipal government, located in the Greater Buenos Aires urban area of Buenos Aires Province, Argentina.

The city was founded by Francisco de Merlo in 1755 and rebuilt by Juan Dillon in 1859.

Merlo is divided in two distinctive regions: Merlo Centro, a middle class district clustered around the train station; and the working class barrios, most of them along the Reconquista River.

The administrative and commercial center is around the main avenue, Avenida del Libertador General San Martín. This tree-covered avenue stretches seven blocks from the railway station to the historic district and has few buildings reaching over two storeys in height.

Merlo is bordered by Moreno and Paso del Rey—both cities in Moreno Partido—and the Reconquista River (northwest), San Antonio de Padua (north), Libertad and Parque San Martín (east) and Mariano Acosta (south).

== History ==
The origin of Merlo goes back to the town of Villa San Antonio del Camino, a hamlet clustered around a ranch-house belonged to the Spanish landlord Francisco de Merlo and which had been founded as a result of the recurrent Araucanian raids throughout the 18th century.

=== Francisco de Merlo ===
Coat of Arms of Francisco de Merlo's.

Francisco Javier de Merlo y Barbosa was born in Seville, Spain, on August 11, 1693, and died in Buenos Aires on April 4, 1758. Merlo arrived in Buenos Aires in the early 18th century and made a fortune and became part of the Buenos Aires upper class; Merlo served as notary public in the municipal government or cabildo of Buenos Aires. He also was a laity member of the Third Order of Our Lady of Mercy. He married Francisca del Toro in 1713 and they had eleven children. After widowed he married María Teresa Gamiz de las Cuevas in 1748, with whom he had a son.

In 1729, the notary public Francisco Sánchez Botija died in Buenos Aires and his last will was his fortune be given to his compatriot, friend and compadre Francisco de Merlo with the condition that a sanctuary be built to his memory and fifty masses celebrated every year for the absolution of his soul.

With that fortune Merlo bought many haciendas in the western countryside and by the middle of the 18th century he established a large estate between the upper Reconquista and upper Matanza rivers, seven leagues (35 km.) from Buenos Aires.

Merlo built his ranch-house on high ground overlooking the nearby Camino Real del Oeste, a road that linked Buenos Aires with Lima, the capital of the Viceroyalty of Peru. At its side Merlo erected a private oratory, fulfilling the last will of his compadre and it was consecrated to Saint Anthony of Padua and the Immaculate Conception. For many years the oratory served as parish church of the huge and almost unpopulated Parish of La Matanza.

He also established one of the first schools outside Buenos Aires in where the locals could learn to read and write; the school was entrusted to the mercedarian friars.

=== San Antonio del Camino ===
In 1742, Francisco de Merlo petitioned king Philip V of Spain authorization to found a village on his estates and it was granted in 1755.

On August 28, 1755, Francisco de Merlo founds the town of Villa San Antonio del Camino, offering free land to anyone willing to settle in the new town.

Villa San Antonio del Camino was named after the before mentioned Portuguese saint and it started with 111 inhabitants grouped in 24 families.

Merlo died on April 4, 1758, and the land was divided between his heirs and sold to different private investors.

The town remained within the bounds of the estancia donated by Merlo to the Mercedarian Order. In 1776 the mercedarian friars build a hospice in order to take care of the poorer people of the rural area.

The town was isolated from the main transportation and communication routes when the nearby road Camino de los Gaona bypassed Merlo three kilometers north after the landlord Juan Marquez built a wooden bridge in his estates over the Reconquista River in 1773. Few years later the parish-seat was moved to the neighboring town of Morón which was already the district seat of the homonymous Partido of Morón, created in 1784.

By 1810, Merlo was an insignificant hamlet, forgotten in middle of the Pampas and where the criollos illegally traded with the Indians.

=== The railway ===
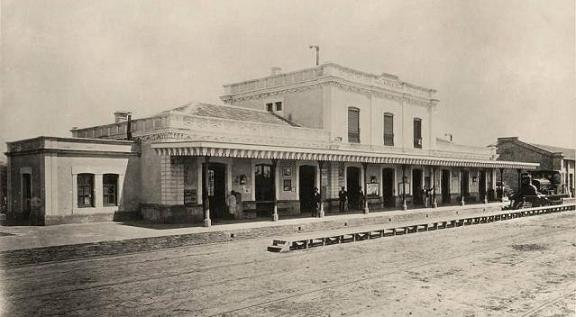
Merlo Railway Station, 1880

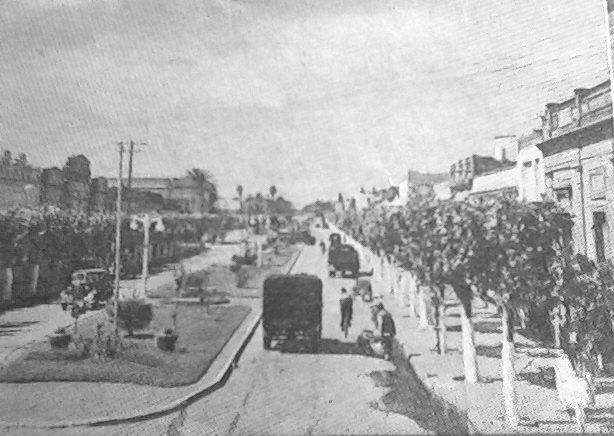
Avenida Ituzaingó (today the Avenida del Libertador San Martín), Merlo's main street, around 1950.

In 1857 the Argentine railway company Camino de Hierro de Buenos Aires al Oeste opens the first steam locomotive public railway in Argentina and few years later the company was planning to extend the line westward to Moreno making land speculation a highly profitable activity. In order to reach Merlo the line would pass through the estancia belonged to Manuela Calderón de Pearson and which was managed by her son Juan Dillon, who saw the opportunity to make huge profits by selling out parts of the family's estate .

In 1859 Juan Dillon commissioned the famous architect and engineer Pedro Benoit to design the layout of the new town, organizing it on a rectangular grid of streets and blocks. The town was enlarged and complemented by Benoit's designs for a town hall, avenue, train station, school and the Church of Our Lady of Mercy.

The train station was opened on August 11, 1859.

=== Merlo in the second half of the 20th century ===
In the second half of the 20th century, Merlo experienced an important influx of immigrants from the provinces and the old town sprawled over the countryside and the farms were replaced by housing for residents with a lower range of incomes.

== Neighbourhoods ==
=== Merlo Centro ===
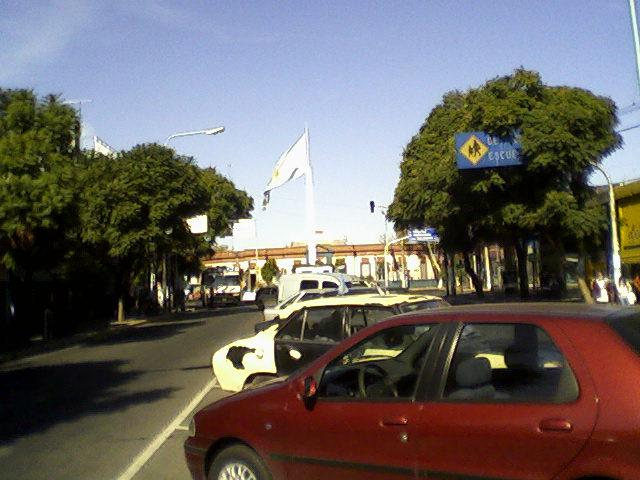
Avenida del Libertador General San Martín.

Merlo Centro is a middle class district clustered around the train station and comprehends the 1859 Juan Dillon's town.

The administrative and commercial center is around the main avenue, Avenida del Libertador General San Martín. This tree-covered avenue stretches seven blocks from the railway station to the historic district and has few buildings reaching over two storeys in height.

==== Historic buildings ====
Nothing remains from Francisco de Merlo's town and hospice.

The oldest building still standing in Merlo is the railway station, opened in 1859 in land donated by Juan Dillon's mother, Manuela Calderón.

The Church of Nuestra Señora de la Merced (Our Lady of Mercy) was consecrated in 1864 and it was built in the same spot where the old Merlo's chapel stood. The building was also designed by Pedro Benoit —prominent neighbor of Merlo and recognized member of the Argentine freemasonry— and built by the Spanish master builder Antonio Ayerbe. The first parish priest was the Irish catholic priest Patrick Joseph Dillon, Juan Dillon's first cousin. He was appointed as chaplain for the Irish community in Merlo and years later he was elected senator in the legislature of Buenos Aires and founder of the newspaper The Southern Cross, which continues in print to this day.

=== Barrios ===
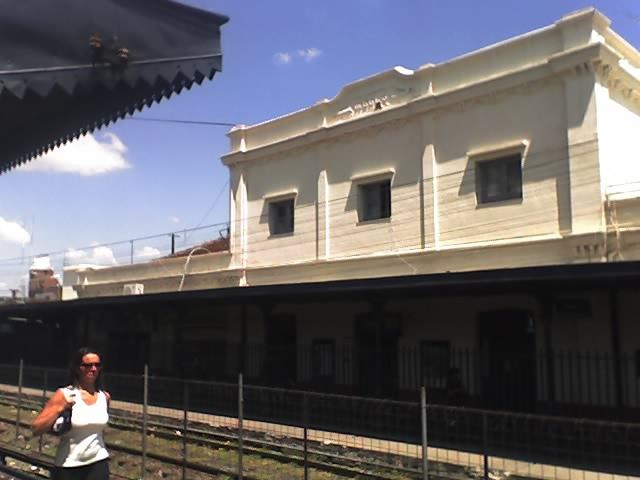
Merlo Railway Station.

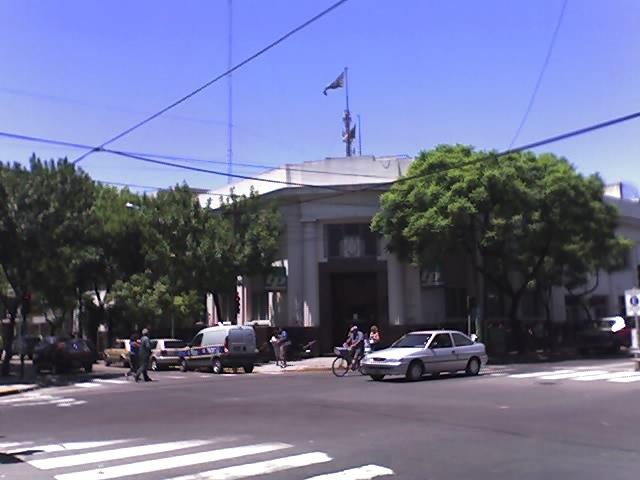
Bank of the Province of Buenos Aires, Merlo branch.

- Merlo Norte
- Pompeya
- Argentino
- Lago del Bosque
- Las Violetas
- Amandi
- Reconquista
- Loma Florida
- San Eduardo
- Arco Iris
- Albatros
- Parque El Sol
- El Mirador
- 2da loma grande

== Notable people ==
- Gabriela Celeste Alaniz (born 1996) - world champion female boxer

== Gallery ==
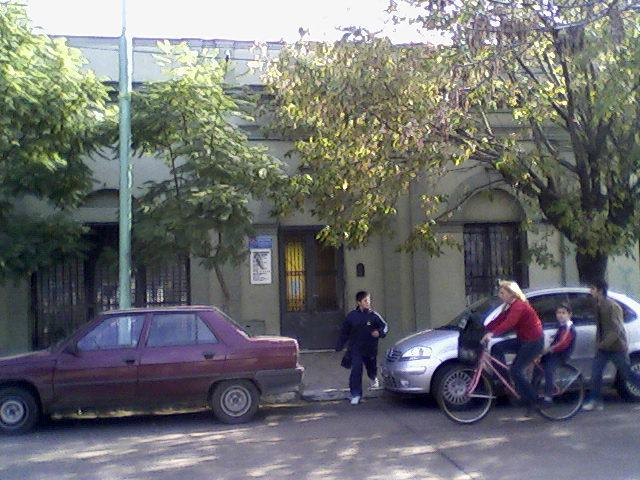
Sullivan House, a residential house dating from the 19th century

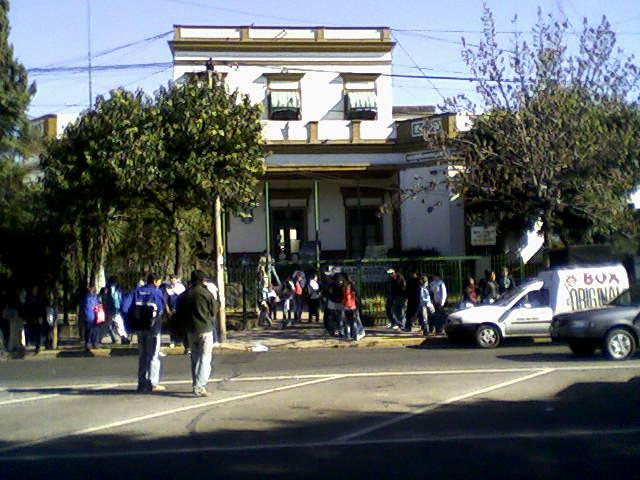
Landaburu House, a historic residence

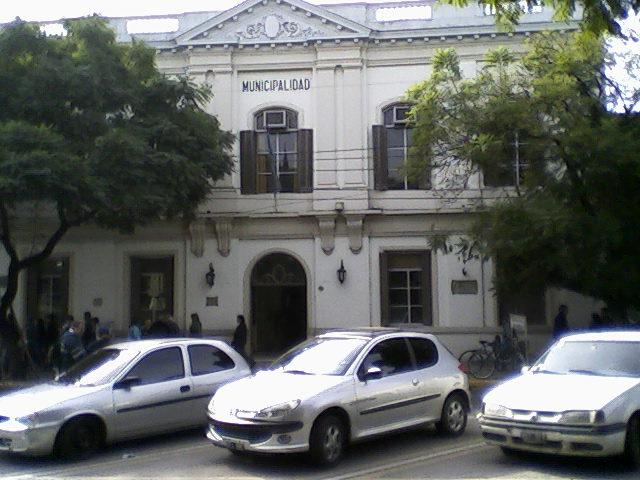
Merlo Municipal Palace

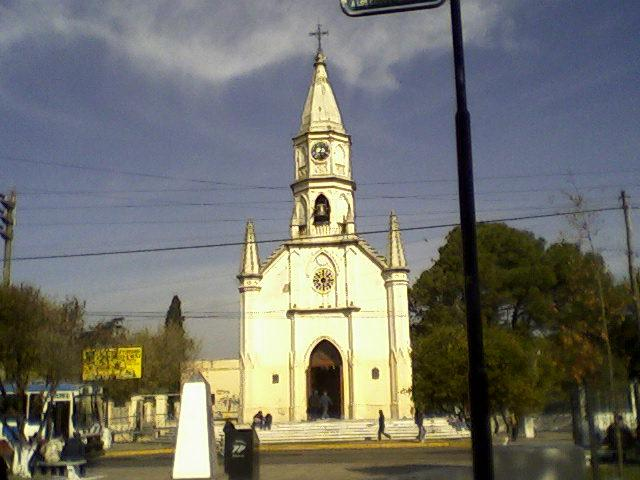
The Church of Our Lady of Mercy (Benoit)

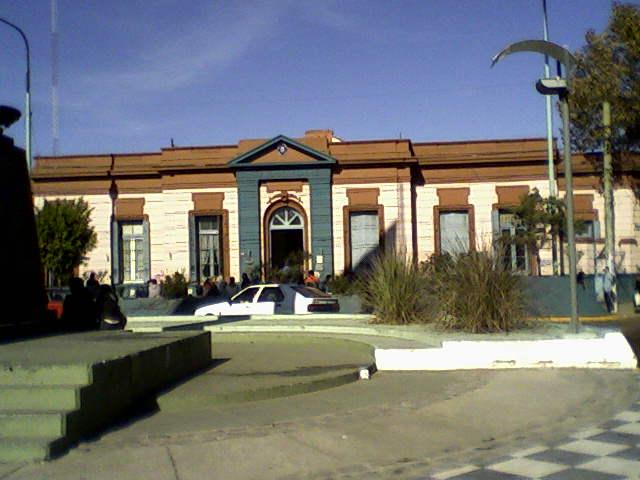
Domingo Faustino Sarmiento school (Benoit)

== See also ==
- Merlo Partido
