= San Antonio de Padua =

- City
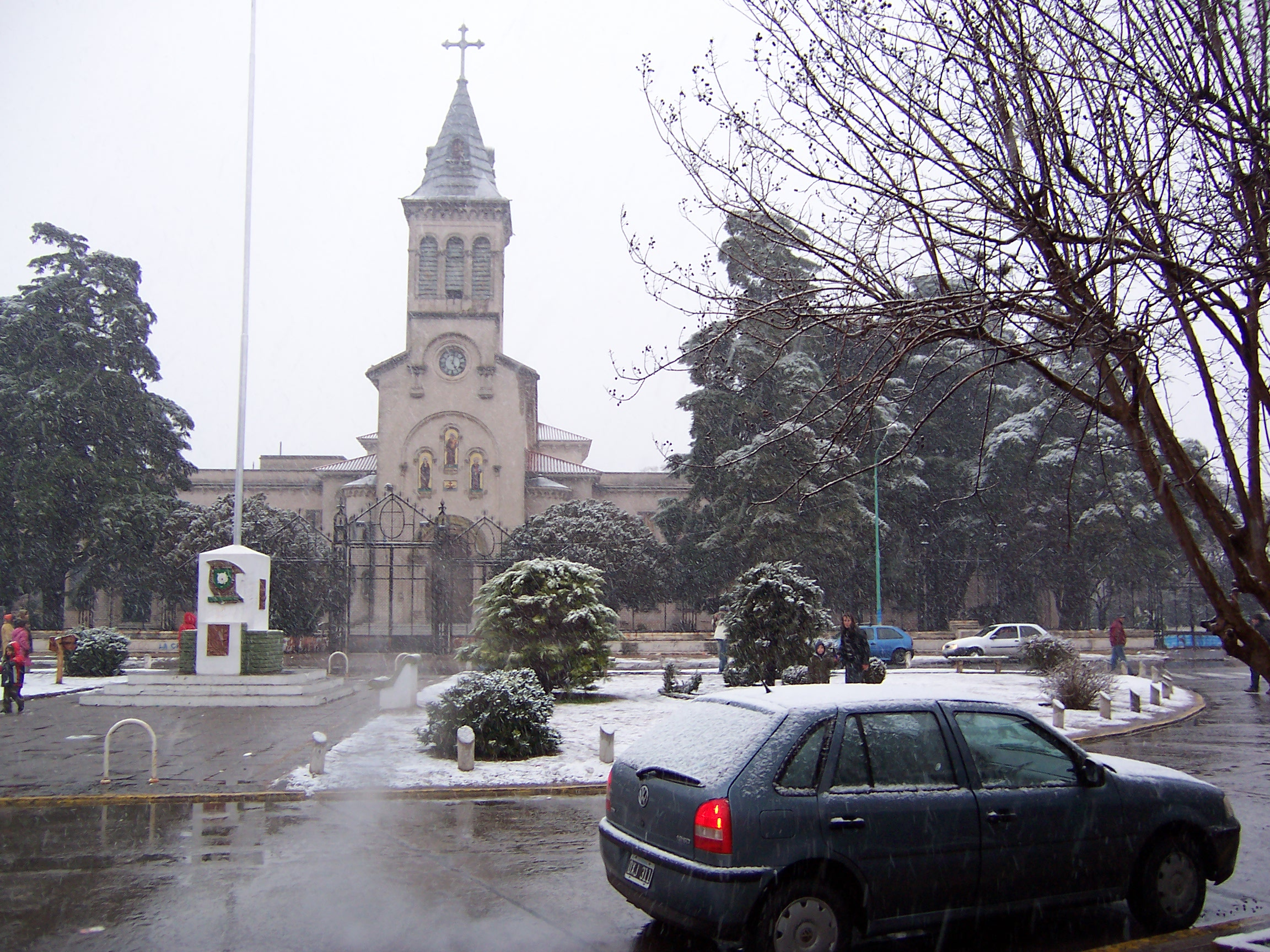
- The Church of San Antonio de Padua during the July 9, 2007 snowstorm, the first in the Buenos Aires area since 1918.

- Coat of arms

- Location in Greater Buenos Aires
- Coordinates: 34°40′S 58°42′W
- Country: Argentina
- Province: Buenos Aires
- Partido: Merlo
- Elevation: 20 m (66 ft)

Population (2001 census [INDEC])
  - Total: 37,775
  - Density: 6,039.2/km^{2} (15,641/sq mi)
- CPA Base: B 1718
- Area code: +54 220

San Antonio de Padua, or plainly Padua, is a city in the Greater Buenos Aires, in Argentina. It is located in Merlo Partido. The city has an area of 6.25 km^{2} (2 sq mi) and a population of around 38,000.

The name commemorates the village founded by Francisco de Merlo, Villa San Antonio del Camino in 1755, named for the Portuguese Saint Anthony of Padua. Buenos Aires is on one of the major rail and road arteries and is well-connected to the most important cities of the western Greater Buenos Aires.

Padua is bordered by the partido of Ituzaingó (north and east), other localidades of Merlo (west and southwest) and Libertad (south).

Padua is basically a flat, low-rise city, with few buildings over two stories, so the skyline is still dominated by the spire of the Church of San Antonio de Padua. The building emerges in the center of a peaceful middle-class neighborhood of white-painted and red-barrel-tiles-roofed houses. The church was inaugurated in 1931 and few years later a Franciscan monastery and a catholic school were erected at its side. The church was built in a Romanesque style and is one of the Padua's landmark buildings.

The commercial center is around the main avenue, Avenida Noguera, stretching six blocks from the railroad station, Estación San Antonio de Padua to the east.

The city status was conferred on September 11, 1974, by the Legislature of Buenos Aires Province.

== History ==
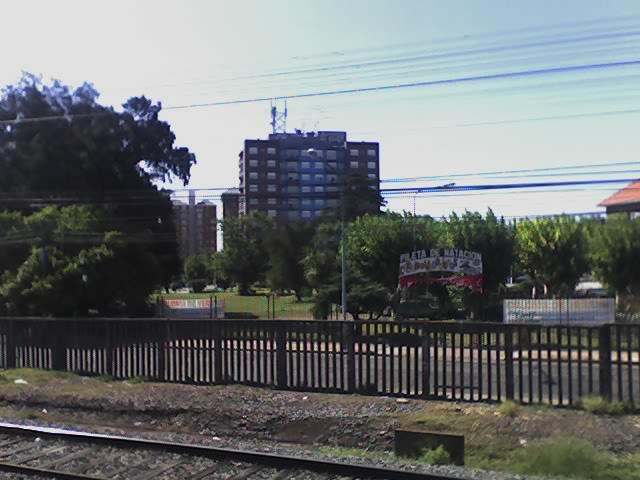
Near the railway station.

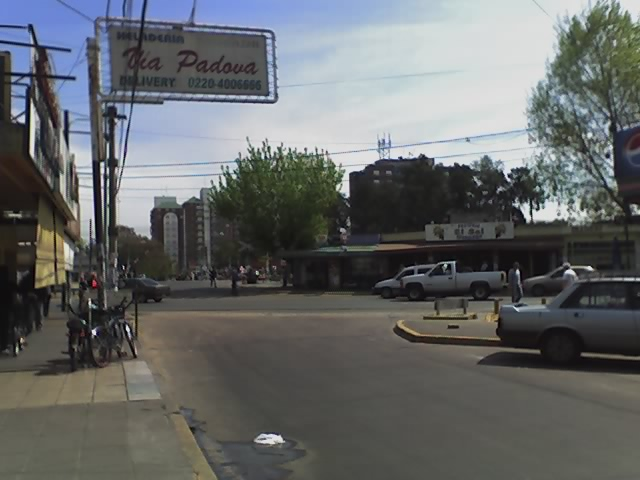
Commercial area.

The present-day territory of Padua was pasture until the 1920s. This area —between the towns of Ituzaingó and Merlo— was filled with many farms when members of the British community founded the Ituzaingó Golf Club in 1919.

The golf club took its name from the nearby town of Ituzaingó and almost all of its first members were white-collar workers of the British-owned railway company Buenos Aires Western Railway Co. that operated the Once-Moreno railway line from 1890 to 1946.

In order to reach the golf course the company opened a railway stop in 1923, just 10 meters from the clubhouse. In the opening ceremony participated members of the catholic clergy and the railway stop was consecrated to Saint Anthony of Padua. Through the next years the railway stop and the surrounding town were known as San Antonio de Padua.

The town started in the 1930s with the first houses built around the railway station and the opening of the parish church in 1931; San Antonio de Padua grew steadily over the decades, and it bloomed in the 1950s.

In the 1970s, the commercial district of San Antonio de Padua —built around the main street Avenida Noguera and next to the railway station— became the most important commercial district in the entire partido of Merlo.

== Sports ==
Club San Antonio de Padua (CASA de Padua), founded on 12 December 1926, is the city's sport club. In its facilities the locals can play a large range of sports such as basketball, hockey, tennis, and rugby. In 1995 the rugby team competed in the first division of the Buenos Aires Rugby Union (URBA) championship.

=== Sport Clubs ===
- (in Spanish) Club Atlético San Antonio de Padua
- (in Spanish) CASA de Padua Rugby Club
- (in Spanish) Ituzaingó Golf Club
