= Mariel Fernández =

Argentine politician

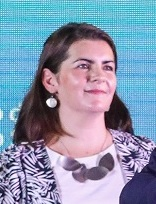

Mayor of Moreno
- Incumbent
- Assumed office 10 December 2019
- Preceded by: Walter Festa

Personal details
- Born: 12 June 1977 (age 49) Cuartel V, Argentina
- Party: Evita Movement
- Other political affiliations: Union for the Homeland (2023–present); Frente de Todos (2019–2023); Front for Victory (2011–2017)

Mariel Fernández (born 12 June 1977) is an Argentine politician who has served as mayor of Moreno Partido, in Buenos Aires Province, since 2019. A member of the Evita Movement, she previously served as a municipal councillor from 2011 to 2015.

Fernández was the first woman elected mayor of Moreno and the first politician formed within Argentina's social movements to become a mayor in the Greater Buenos Aires metropolitan area.

== Early life and career ==
Fernández was born on 12 June 1977 and grew up in the San Norberto neighbourhood of Cuartel V, a neighborhood in the periphery of the Moreno city center. She was the second of three siblings.

During her childhood, Fernández participated in community activities associated with the Catholic Church and local Peronist priests. At the age of 15, she and her sister began teaching catechism. Her father was shot during an attempted robbery in 1996 and died from his injuries three weeks later, when Fernández was 18. Following her father's death, a neighbour introduced her to El Colmenar, a community-run transport mutual established in response to the limited bus service connecting Cuartel V with central Moreno. Fernández initially provided educational support for children and later worked in its reception office, sold tickets and coordinated youth groups and summer programmes.

She founded La Chicharra Cultural Centre in Cuartel V, which hosted educational, recreational and vocational workshops, a community dining hall and activities promoting local culture. The organisation later developed a community radio station and a tertiary-level teacher-training institute. In 2005, Fernández and the organisations with which she worked joined the Evita Movement

== Political career ==
Fernández became the Evita Movement's main representative in Moreno and joined its provincial women's and leadership organisations. In 2011, she was elected to the Moreno Deliberative Council as a member of the Front for Victory, serving until 2015.

Following the 2015 municipal election, newly elected mayor Walter Festa appointed Fernández as head of the Municipal Institute for Local Economic Development (Instituto Municipal de Desarrollo Económico Local, IMDEL). The institute oversaw policies related to local production, the popular economy, food production and tourism. During her approximately one year in the position, it organised regional producers' markets, employment and training programmes and the rehabilitation of the Los Robles municipal park.

In 2017, Fernández was a candidate for municipal councillor for the Justicialist Front's Cumplir alliance, led nationally by Florencio Randazzo. She did not obtain a seat after the alliance finished fourth in the municipal election.

=== Mayor of Moreno ===
Fernández ran for mayor in 2019 as one of seven candidates contesting the Frente de Todos primary. She defeated the six other candidates, including incumbent mayor Walter Festa. In the general election, she received approximately 60 per cent of the vote, defeating Juntos por el Cambio candidate Aníbal Asseff by a margin of more than 30 percentage points. She took office in December 2019, becoming the first woman to govern Moreno.

Fernández began her administration amid an economic recession, a housing shortage, financial and administrative problems within the municipality and, several months later, the COVID-19 pandemic in Argentina. Her government transferred several previously contracted services to municipal or mixed public-cooperative administration. These included municipal tax collection, paid parking and rubbish collection, the latter operated through an arrangement between the municipality and a cooperative associated with the truck drivers' union.

Her administration also modified local land-use regulations and promoted agreements under which owners of unused rural land could make it available to agroecological cooperatives. Fernández argued that such policies could discourage informal land occupations while using vacant land for food production, housing and employment-generating projects.

During her first term, Fernández reorganised the municipal administration and consolidated a local political structure centred on the Movement Evita. In 2021, she replaced several officials associated with former mayor Mariano West and strengthened relations with political and trade-union sectors linked to national deputy Walter Correa. These changes ended an earlier governing alliance with West's Pueblo Libre organisation and generated tensions among factions of the local Peronist movement.

Fernández supported retaining Argentina's system of open primary elections, attributing her own emergence as a mayoral candidate to the system. She also opposed the indefinite re-election of mayors, although she stated that she would not oppose allowing one additional term if a political consensus supported it.

In the 2023 municipal election, Fernández ran for re-election as the candidate of Union for the Homeland. She won a second term with 57.54 per cent of the vote, defeating La Libertad Avanza candidate Andrea Vera, who received approximately 24.5 per cent. Fernández began her second term in December 2023.

== Personal life ==
Fernández is married to Esteban Castro, a social-movement and trade-union leader who formerly served as a Moreno municipal councillor and as secretary-general of the Confederation of Workers of the Popular Economy (Confederación de Trabajadores de la Economía Popular, CTEP).

She has two sons, Jonathan, also known as Joni, and León. Fernández met Jonathan while working at Asociación El Arca and later adopted him when he was a young child. León is her son with Castro.

Political offices
Preceded by Walter Festa	Mayor of Moreno; 2019–present	Incumbent
