= Parque San Martín, Buenos Aires =

City in Buenos Aires Province, Argentina

Parque San Martín
- City
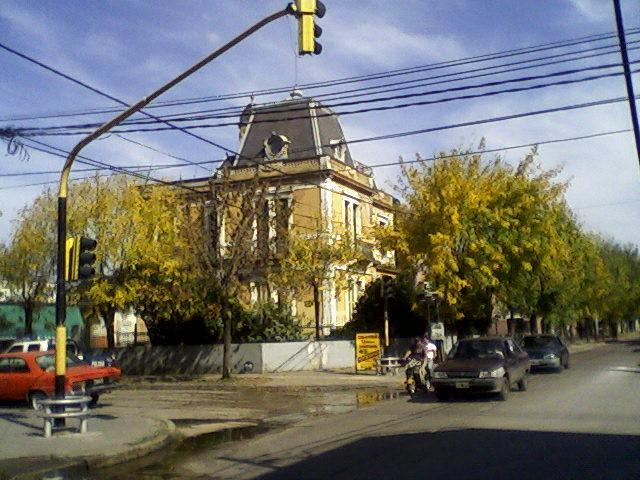
- Colegio Nuestra Señora de la Gruta, private Catholic school.

- Location in Greater Buenos Aires
- Coordinates: 34°41′00″S 58°43′45″W
- Country: Argentina
- Province: Buenos Aires
- Partido: Merlo
- Elevation: 16 m (52 ft)

Population (1991 census [INDEC])
  - Total: 89,073
- CPA Base: B 1722
- Area code: +54 220

Parque San Martín is a city located in Merlo Partido, Buenos Aires Province, Argentina. Parque San Martín was founded around 1948 by real estate promoters, in the estates belonging to the Etcheverry family. Like many others places in Argentina, the city was named after the Argentine independence hero General José de San Martín.

The city status was conferred by the provincial legislature of Buenos Aires on 17 November 1975, in the administration of Francisco Tomeo, last Radical Intendente (Mayor) of Merlo Partido.

Parque San Martín is bordered by the cities of Merlo (north and west), Libertad (east) and Pontevedra and Mariano Acosta (south).

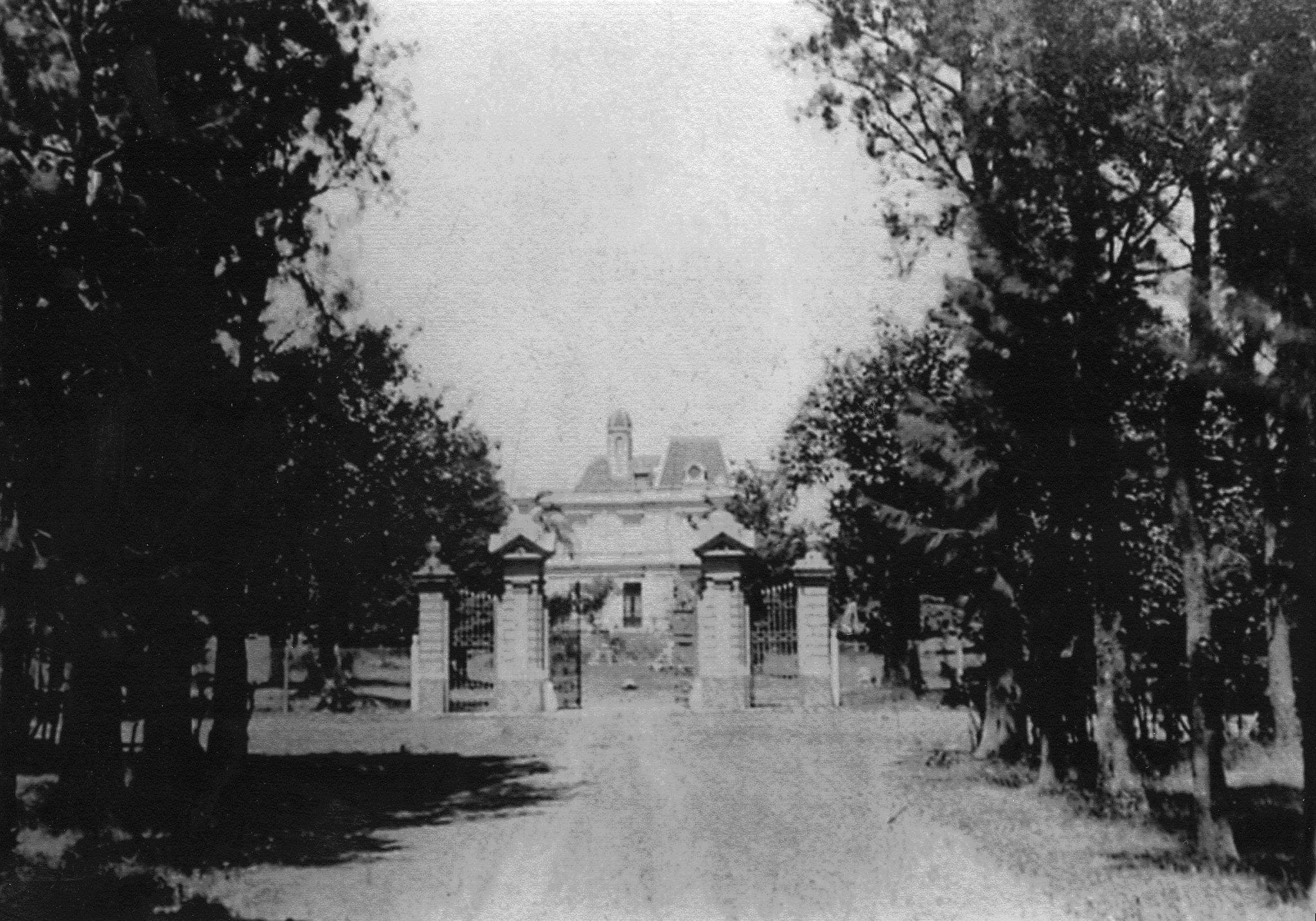
Estancia Echeverry (early 20th century): gate and manor house.

== History ==
The present-day territory of Parque San Martín was pasture until the 1950s. In the 17th and 18th centuries the land was part of a Jesuit Estancia and after the suppression of the Order it was confiscated as public land. The land was leased to different private investors and by the mid 19th century it was bought by John Wyatt Smith who established one of the finest farms in Buenos Aires. By the turn of the century the estancia was sold to Roberto Cano who built a petit French-like mansion in his estate, still stood as a neighborhood landmark. The building is known as Palacio Cano (Cano House) as well as the Casco de Estancia de los Etcheverry (the Etcheverry Family Ranch House) after the last owners of the estancia.

== Demographics ==
According to the 1991 census [INDEC], the population was 89,073 people, and although the 2001 census results are not available, it could be around 100,000. The majority of the population belong to the lower middle and working classes and the district suffers from high rates of poverty and unemployment.

== Sports ==
The city is the home of the football club entitled Deportivo Merlo.

== See also ==
- Merlo Partido
