= Alkorta (surname) =

Alkorta is a Basque surname. Notable people with the surname include:

- Agustín Aranzábal Alkorta (born 1973), Spanish footballer
- David Etxebarria Alkorta (born 1973), Spanish road racing cyclist
- Rafael Alkorta (born 1968), Spanish footballer, sporting director of Athletic Bilbao

== See also ==
- Alcorta, its Castilianized version
