= Libertad, Buenos Aires =

City in Buenos Aires Province, Argentina

Libertad
- City
- Coat of arms

- Location in Greater Buenos Aires
- Coordinates: 34°41′S 58°41′W
- Country: Argentina
- Province: Buenos Aires
- Partido: Merlo
- Elevation: 26 m (85 ft)

Population (2001 census [INDEC])
  - Total: 100,324
- CPA Base: B 1716
- Area code: +54 220

Libertad is a city located in Merlo Partido, Buenos Aires Province, Argentina. It forms part of the Greater Buenos Aires urban conurbation.

Its origin goes back to the 1870s when, by that time, a rural settlement was thriving around a pulpería (public house) called La Libertad (Freedom), from where the town took its name.

During the last decades a group of prominent neighbors had been working to obtain the autonomy of the city and make Libertad a new partido in the province.

According to the 2001 census [INDEC], the population was 100,476.

Libertad is bordered by Parque San Martín (west), Pontevedra (south), Merlo (northwest), San Antonio de Padua and Morón (north) and La Matanza Partido (east).
