= Casimiro Alcorta =

Argentine musician

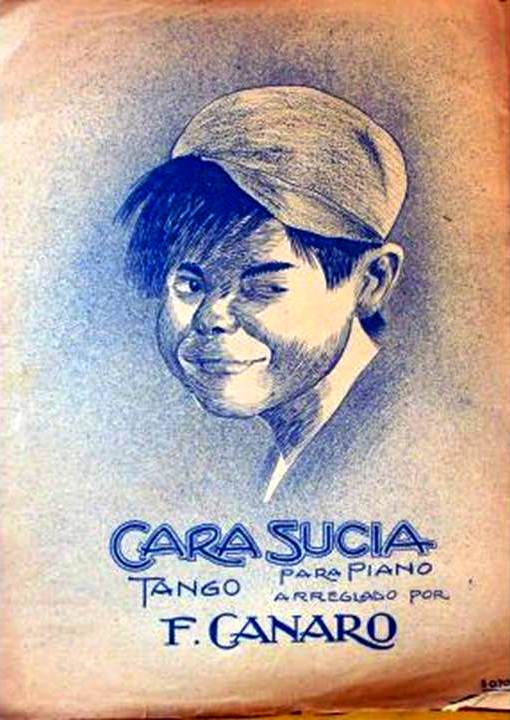
Sheet music cover dated 1916. "Cara sucia" was performed in 1919 by Orquestra Francisco Canaro and singer Lola Membrives. Audio.

Casimiro Alcorta (1840–1913) was a musician of Argentina, considered one of the fathers of tango music. An Afro-Argentine son of slaves, Alcorta was born in Santiago del Estero, Argentina. He became free as a child, and took the name of his owner, as was typical. His mother, Casimira, was a slave of the landowner and musician Amancio Jacinto Alcorta (1805-1862), one of the first classical composers of Argentina.

Casimiro excelled as a violinist, dancer and songwriter. His musical career spanned the years from 1855 to 1913, i.e., from the first time when the tango began to form, until it took final shape and identity. The first tango "group" was composed of Alcorta (violin) and Sinforoso (clarinet). As a dancer, he formed a legendary duo with his partner La Paulina, of Italian origin, with whom he remained until his death in 1913.

As a composer, in 1884 he authored the music to famous tango "Concha Sucia" ("Dirty Cunt" in Argentine slang), which decades later would be renamed "Cara Sucia" ("Dirty Face"), with music rearranged by Francisco Canaro. Alcorta is also known to have composed the tango "La yapa", later renamed "Entrada prohibida" ("Forbidden entry") and credited to brothers Teisseire. Alcorta died in Buenos Aires in 1913, in the arms of Paulina.

== Bibliography ==
- Duque Castillo, Elvia (April 2013). iUniverse (ed.). Aportes del Pueblo Afrodescendiente: La Historia Oculta de America Latina. iUniverse. ISBN 978-1-4759-6583-4.
- Viejo Tanguero (atrib. José Antonio Saldías) (22 September 1913). El tango: su evolución y su historia. Buenos Aires: Crítica.
- Selles, Roberto. LP Tango (ed.). "Los negros del tango: de Casimiro a Rosendo". Archived from the original on 2015-12-08.
- Marcelo Solis. "History of Tango-Part 2: The origins of Tango".
