= Trujui =

City in Buenos Aires Province, Argentina

- City
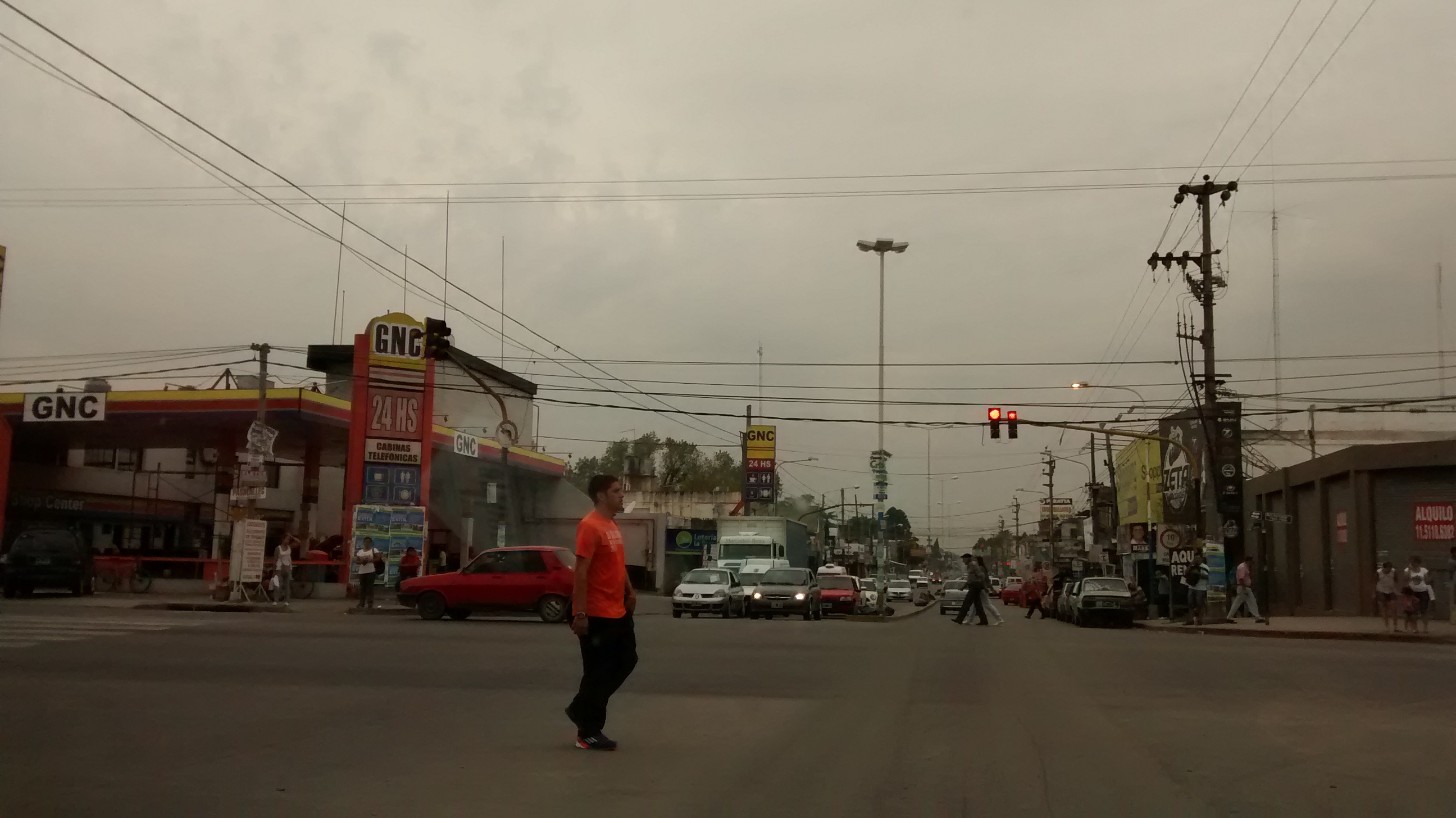

- Location in Greater Buenos Aires
- Coordinates: 34°35′S 58°42′W
- Country: Argentina
- Province: Buenos Aires
- Partido: Moreno
- Founded: 1942
- Elevation: 26 m (85 ft)

Population (2015)
  - Total: 98,649
- CPA Base: B 1664
- Area code: +54 237

Trujui is a city in Buenos Aires Province, Argentina. It is the second largest city in Moreno Partido. It forms part of the Greater Buenos Aires urban conurbation and is located around 48 km (30 mi) to the west of the autonomous city of Buenos Aires.

As of 2015, the population was 98,649.
