= Moreno Partido =

Moreno Partido de Moreno
- Department
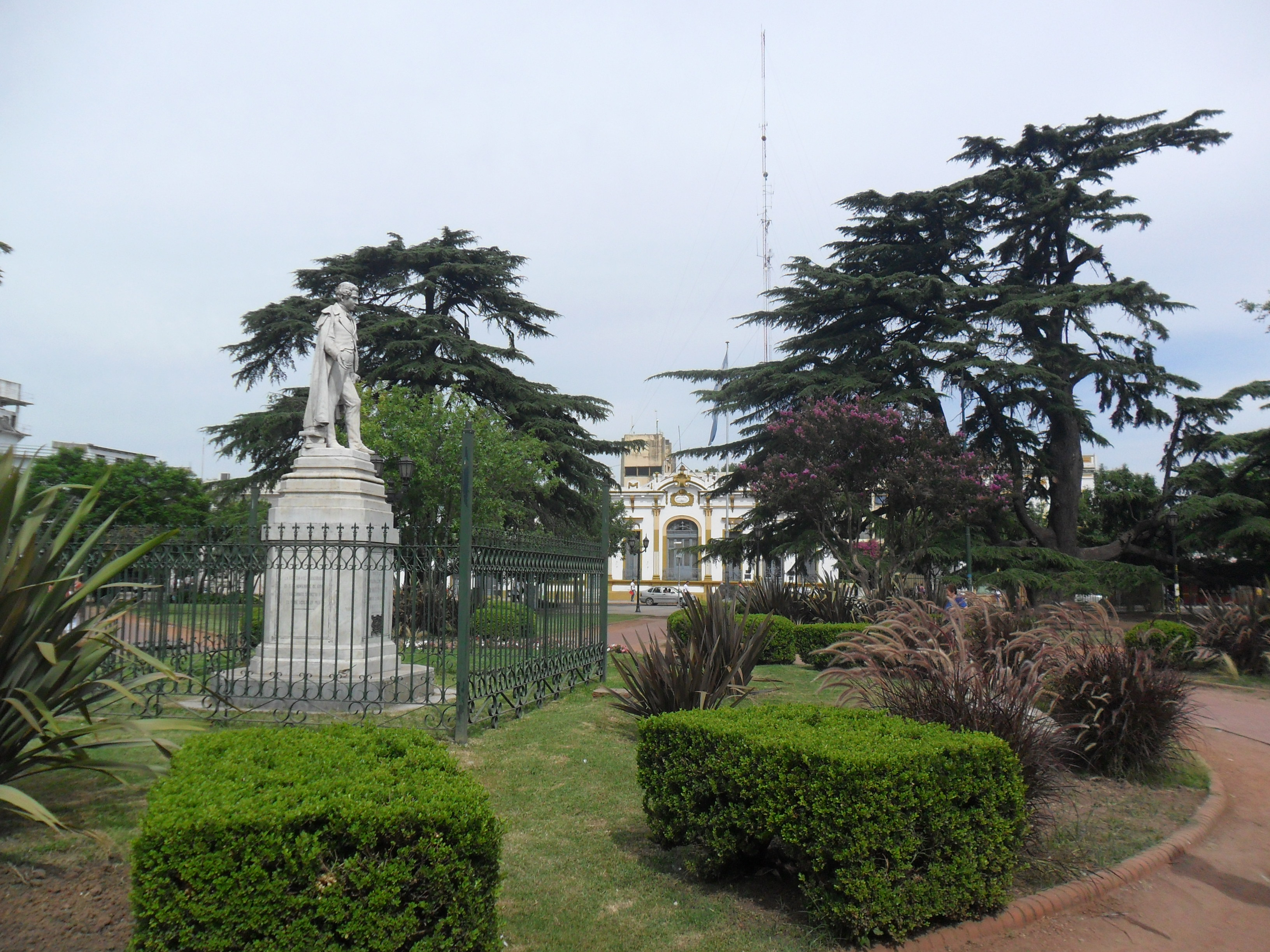

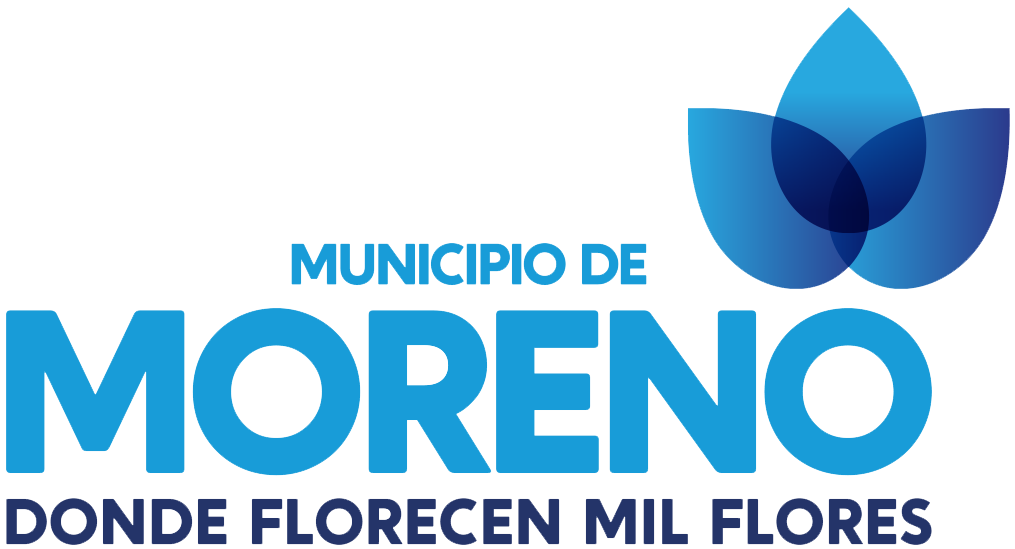

- location of Moreno Partido in Gran Buenos Aires
- Coordinates: 34°39′S 58°47′W
- Country: Argentina
- Established: October 24, 1864
- Founder: Amancio Jacinto Alcorta
- Seat: Moreno

Government
  - Intendant: Mariel Fernández (Evita Movement)

Area
  - Total: 186.13 km^{2} (71.87 sq mi)

Population
  - Total: 462,242
  - Density: 2,483.4/km^{2} (6,432.1/sq mi)
- Demonym: morenense
- Postal Code: B1744
- IFAM: BUE085
- Area Code: 0237
- Patron saint: Nuestra Sra. del Rosario
- Website: www.moreno.gob.ar

Moreno Partido is a partido of the Buenos Aires Province, Argentina, within the Gran Buenos Aires urban agglomeration. It has an area of 186 square kilometres (72 sq mi) and a population of 462,242 (2010 census [INDEC]). It is named after the Argentine politician Mariano Moreno.

== Demographics ==
The evolution of the population from the end of the 20th century is: 114,041 (1970); 194,440 (1980); 287,295 (1991); 380,503 (2001); 462,242 (2010)

Moreno has grown in population during the first years of the 21st century thanks to the Chinese immigration that swept all over Argentina, to which Moreno was no exception.

== Transportation ==
Moreno is connected to the Capital Federal by the railways (Ferrocarril Sarmiento), where Moreno is the last station and Once (Capital Federal) is the first one.

In 2007 Moreno renewed itself by doing a makeover of its bus and train station based on a 1980s architectural plan. Because of this several streets in Moreno Centro have changed from being two-way to one-way since the beginning of the 21st century.

== Museums ==
The Museo de Historia Natural "Francisco Javier Muñiz" de Moreno was inaugurated in Moreno Partido in 1999 in honor of Francisco Javier Muñiz, who was considered the first paleontologist of Argentina. Partido de Luján, now part of Moreno, was the site of his most important discoveries.

== Districts (localidades) ==
- Moreno (capital, or cabecera)
- La Reja
- Francisco Álvarez
- Cuartel V
- Trujui
- Paso del Rey
