= Amancio Jacinto Alcorta =

Argentine composer, policy maker and politician

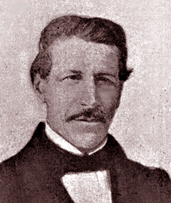
Amancio J. Alcorta

Amancio Jacinto Alcorta (August 16, 1805 – May 3, 1862) was an Argentine composer, policy maker and politician.

== Life and times ==
=== Musician and representative ===
Amancio Jacinto Alcorta was born in Santiago del Estero, Argentina, in 1805. His father, a prosperous merchant from Vizcaya, Spain, was the colonial city's Postmaster, at the time. He was sent in 1817 to a school operated by the Franciscan Order and, in 1820, to the college of Montserrat, where he was taught music by flutist José María Cambeses. He began composing in 1822 and in 1825, attended a local performance of Gioachino Rossini's The Barber of Seville (its first in Argentina).

Alcorta enrolled at the University of Córdoba, then the most important in the newly independent Argentina. Before graduating, he was elected in 1826 to the Argentine Congress for his native Santiago del Estero Province, a post he resigned from for not being of sufficient age to hold the office. Following the advent of the Argentine Confederation, Santiago del Estero Governor Antonio Deheza appointed him in 1830 as his province's Minister, a diplomatic post with the difficult task of representing each province's respective interests vis-à-vis the Confederation's paramount figure, Buenos Aires Province Governor Juan Manuel de Rosas. He was offered the post of Minister of Salta Province by Governor José Güemes, in 1831, though Güemes' overthrow a few months later cut the experience short. He then married Coleta Palacio, with whom he had nine children.

Alcorta devoted the ensuing years to music composition. A prolific composer, he created numerous waltzes, minuets, nocturnes and contra dances, as well as numerous pieces of chamber music for piano and flute. Among his numerous works of sacred music, he published The Agony, a canto for tenor, baritone and organ, for Good Friday observations in 1843; the majority of his compositions from this period were lost, however.

=== National policy maker ===
Following the Battle of Caseros, Governor Rosas fled the country and, with the enactment of the Constitution of Argentina in May 1853, Alcorta was elected to the Argentine Senate. He formed part of the modern Senate's first Committee on Customs Regulation; as such, wrote the nation's first Law of Expropriation and influenced policy over one of the nation's most divisive institutions: customs. The regulation of the Ports of Buenos Aires and those along the Paraná River, as well as the distribution of customs revenue, remained one of the greatest threats to national unity as late as 1880, and Alcorta supported the procurement of foreign credit to maintain the Paraná customs as a means to lessen Argentina's dependence on revenue from secessionist Buenos Aires. A respected arbiter of the many conflicts surrounding customs collection, he was named to the powerful Commerce Tribunal and Government Advisory Council. He was also a noted supporter of the expansion of domestic credit, which he hoped could avoid excess reliance on the often usurious loans obtained in Paris. His treatise, Banks and Their Usefulness in Argentina, helped lead to his appointment to the Public Credit Administration, and he served as President of the Buenos Aires Stock Exchange from 1855 to 1857.

Alcorta had purchased land 35 km (22 mi) west of Buenos Aires upon his election to the Senate. He christened the property Estancia Paso del Rey ("King's Ford Ranch") and, in 1860, established the municipality of Moreno (today a thriving suburb of Buenos Aires). Alcorta lived in the placid estancia throughout his career in Government, and continued to compose music (writing a Gradual for the feast of Saint Martin of Tours in 1854, for example). A supporter of the newly arrived railways into Argentina, he donated a portion of his estancia to what later became the Sarmiento Railway Line.

Senator Alcorta collaborated with Dalmacio Vélez Sarsfield in the drafting of Argentina's first Commercial Code. Relaxing at his estancia while studying Vélez Sasfield's bill, he died suddenly in 1862; he was 56. Much like his close friend, Juan Bautista Alberdi, Amancio Alcorta was both a valuable contributor to the survival of the constitutional republic in the perilous years after 1853, and, an important precursor to the development of music in Argentina. Though many of his works were lost, 54 compositions were ultimately located and published in Argentina and in Paris, between 1869 and 1883.

== See also ==
- Casimiro Alcorta
