= Reconquista River =

River in the province of Buenos Aires, Argentina

Coordinates: 34°24′30″S 58°35′28″W

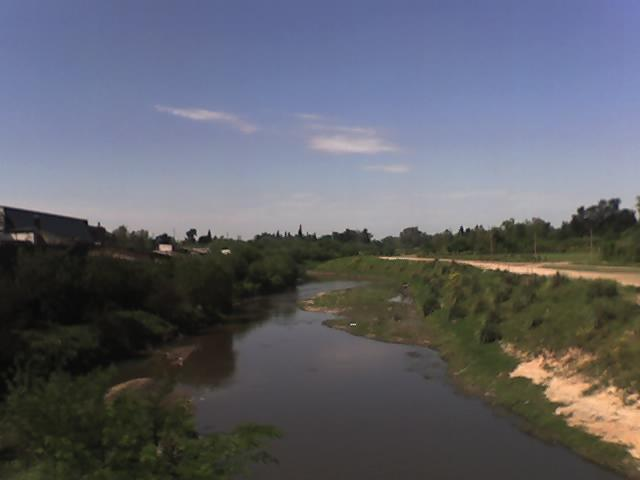
Reconquista River

The Reconquista River (Spanish, Río Reconquista) is a small river in the province of Buenos Aires, Argentina. Together with the Riachuelo, it is one of the most contaminated watercourses in the country.

The Reconquista is part of the Río de la Plata basin. It originates in Marcos Paz, Buenos Aires Province, and flows across 18 municipalities, emptying into the Luján River. Its drainage basin has an area of 1,670 square kilometres (640 mi^{2}) and is populated by around 4 million people.

The river carries about 33 percent of the total pollution drained by the estuary of the Río de la Plata, taking into account both industrial and domestic waste. There are about 12,000 industries in its basin, 700 of which dump their waste into the watercourse without controls.

Studies have found nitrites, nitrates, ester-phenols, PCB, and heavy metals. These pollutants can cause hepatitis, skin reactions, gastrointestinal problems and eye infections.

== History ==
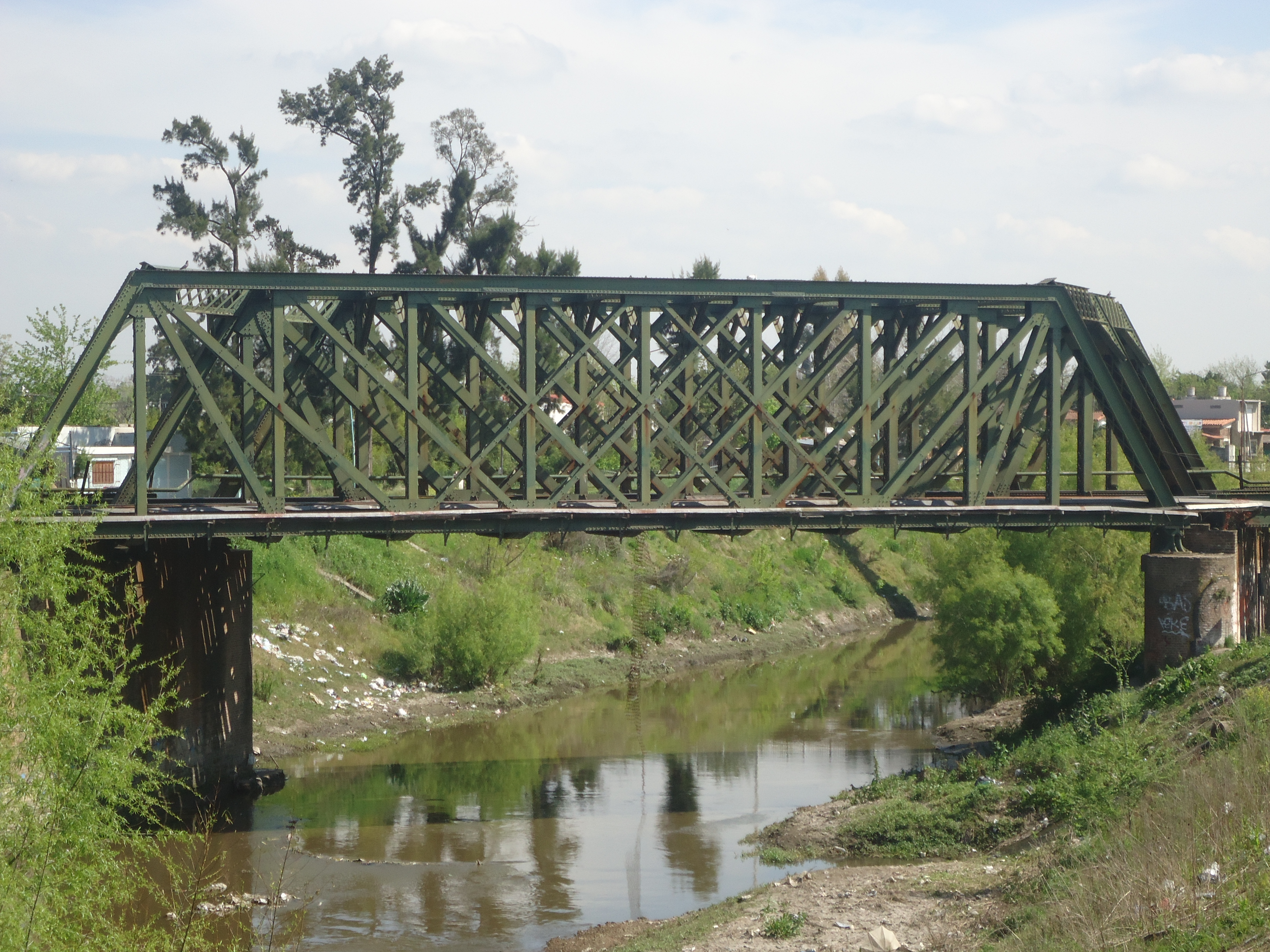
Railway bridge over the Reconquista River in Paso del Rey.

During the 1980s, there was a wave of protests by local residents denouncing the lack of state involvement in cleaning up the river. In 1984, the national Senate addressed the issue of pollution in the Reconquista for the first time.

In 1995, the national government obtained a loan from the Inter-American Development Bank for the cleaning and control of the Reconquista. The construction started in 1996, with a $400 million budget assigned to an autonomous entity called UniRec.

In 2001 they were officially finished, and advertised as such, though only the flood prevention works were built. Four projected waste treatment plants and other sanitation infrastructure were not. There was also no minimization or monitoring of industrial waste dumped into the course.

According to Martín Nunziata, member of a Río de la Plata environmental group, this failure to comply with the plan was the result of political corruption, and also due to the pressure exerted by the polluting industries on the workers: "The companies warn [them] that, if the environmental laws are applied, they will have to close."

Nunziata also alluded to the cellulose plant conflict between Argentina and Uruguay: "If, starting today, it was decided to demand from the industries of the Reconquista River the same things we want Uruguay to demand from the Fray Bentos cellulose plants, out of the 12,000 companies installed, at least 10,000 would have to close down."

== Destroyed historic bridge ==
The 1773 Márquez Bridge over the Reconquista River was declared a National Historic Monument of Argentina, but in 1997, the Autopistas del Oeste demolished it.

== See also ==
- List of rivers of Argentina
- List of destroyed heritage § Argentina
- List of National Historic Monuments of Argentina
