= Marcos Paz Partido =

Marcos Paz Partido Partido de Marcos Paz
- Department
- location of Marcos Paz Partido in Buenos Aires Province
- Coordinates: 34°46′S 58°50′W
- Country: Argentina
- Established: October 25, 1878
- Founder: provincial law 1244
- Seat: Marcos Paz

Government
  - Intendant: Ricardo Pedro Curutchet (Union for the Homeland)

Area
  - Total: 470 km^{2} (180 sq mi)

Population
  - Total: 43,400
  - Density: 92/km^{2} (240/sq mi)
- Demonym: marcospacense
- Postal Code: B1727
- IFAM: BUE080
- Area Code: 0220
- Website: www.marcospaz.gov.ar

Marcos Paz is a partido in the Argentine province of Buenos Aires. Its capital city is Marcos Paz.

Established on 25 October 1878 (provincial law 1244), Marcos Paz is at the eastern border of Greater Buenos Aires with the rest of the province, although in an administrative sense, it is not considered part of the metropolitan area.

According to the 2001 INDEC National Census, the partido has 43,400 inhabitants, and a population density of 92.34 inhabitants per square kilometre (239.2/sq mi). Marcos Paz's mayor is Ricardo Pedro Curuchet, of the local Partido Vecinalista.

== Name ==
The town of Marcos Paz, which gives its name to the partido, gradually built up around a train station, Estación Coronel Doctor Marcos Paz. The station was named after Coronel Doctor Marcos Paz, an Argentine politician and vice president to Bartolomé Mitre in 1862.

== Settlements ==
- Marcos Paz, seat of the district
- Elías Romero
- Santa Rosa
- Lisandro de la Torre
- Santa Marta
- Barrio El Portugués

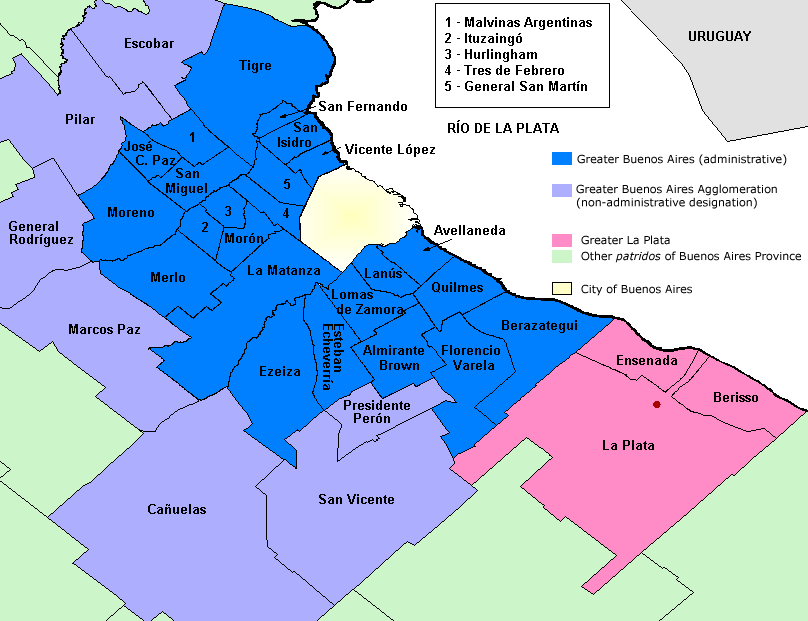
Marcos Paz within Greater Buenos Aires
