= 2023 Primera Nacional =

39th season of the second-tier football league in Argentina

Primera Nacional
- Season: 2023
- Dates: 3 February – 2 December 2023
- Champions: Independiente Rivadavia (1st title)
- Promoted: Independiente Rivadavia; Deportivo Riestra
- Relegated: Flandria; Villa Dálmine
- Matches: 664
- Goals: 1,409 (2.12 per match)
- Top goalscorer: Alex Arce (25 goals)
- Biggest home win: Patronato 6–0 Alvarado (6 March)
- Biggest away win: Tristán Suárez 0–4 Dep. Maipú (4 March); Chaco For Ever 0–4 Quilmes (10 September)
- Highest scoring: Gimnasia y Esgrima (M) 4–3 Almagro (1 October)

The 2023 Argentine Primera Nacional, also known as the Campeonato de Primera Nacional "Campeones del Mundo" 2023, was the 39th season of the Primera Nacional, the second-tier competition of Argentine football. The season began on 3 February and ended on 2 December 2023. Thirty-seven teams competed in the league, thirty-three of which took part in the 2022 season, along with two teams relegated from Primera División, one team promoted from Torneo Federal A and another one promoted from Primera B Metropolitana.

Independiente Rivadavia promoted to Primera División and won the competition for the first time in this season, defeating Almirante Brown 2–0 after extra time in the championship final played on 29 October 2023. The other promoted side was Deportivo Riestra, who won the Torneo Reducido after defeating Deportivo Maipú in the final.

== Format ==
For this season, the competition was played under a format similar to the one used for the 2021 season, with the thirty-seven participating teams being split into two zones, one of 19 teams and another one of 18 teams, where they played against the other teams in their group twice: once at home and once away, with one team in Zone A having a bye in each round. No interzonal or derby matchdays were played, and teams from the same city were drawn into different zones. Both zone winners played a final match on neutral ground to decide the first promoted team to the Liga Profesional for the 2024 season, while the teams placed from second to eighth place in each zone played a knockout tournament (Torneo Reducido) for the second promotion berth along with the loser of the final between the zone winners, which joined the Reducido in the second round. The teams placing in bottom place of each zone were relegated at the end of the season, with a third relegated team slated to be decided in a playoff match between the sides placing second-from-bottom in each group. However, the third relegation from Primera Nacional and consequently, the relegation playoffs, were cancelled by the Argentine Football Association on 23 October 2023 in order to have a 38-team competition for 2024.

This tournament also served as part of the qualification process for the 2024 Copa Argentina, qualifying 15 teams for that competition: the top 7 teams in each group plus the best eighth-placed one. The draw to decide the fixture of the season was held on 29 December 2022 at the Argentine Football Association's Ezeiza offices.

== Club information ==
=== Stadia and locations ===
Locations of the 2023 Primera Nacional teams outside Greater Buenos Aires.
Locations of the 2023 Primera Nacional teams within Greater Buenos Aires.

Club	City	Province	Stadium	Capacity
Agropecuario Argentino	Carlos Casares	Buenos Aires	Ofelia Rosenzuaig	8,000
Aldosivi	Mar del Plata	Buenos Aires	José María Minella	35,180
All Boys	Buenos Aires	—	Islas Malvinas	12,199
Almagro	José Ingenieros	Buenos Aires	Tres de Febrero	12,500
Almirante Brown	Isidro Casanova	Buenos Aires	Fragata Presidente Sarmiento	25,000
Alvarado	Mar del Plata	Buenos Aires	José María Minella	35,180
Atlanta	Buenos Aires	—	Don León Kolbowsky	14,000
Atlético de Rafaela	Rafaela	Santa Fe	Nuevo Monumental	16,000
Brown	Adrogué	Buenos Aires	Lorenzo Arandilla	4,500
Chacarita Juniors	Villa Maipú	Buenos Aires	Chacarita Juniors	19,000
Chaco For Ever	Resistencia	Chaco	Juan Alberto García	23,000
Defensores de Belgrano	Buenos Aires	—	Juan Pasquale	9,000
Defensores Unidos	Zárate	Buenos Aires	Mario Lossino	6,000
Deportivo Madryn	Puerto Madryn	Chubut	Abel Sastre	8,000
Deportivo Maipú	Maipú	Mendoza	Omar Higinio Sperdutti	8,000
Deportivo Morón	Morón	Buenos Aires	Nuevo Francisco Urbano	32,000
Deportivo Riestra	Buenos Aires	—	Guillermo Laza	3,000
Estudiantes	Caseros	Buenos Aires	Ciudad de Caseros	16,740
Estudiantes	Río Cuarto	Córdoba	Antonio Candini	15,000
Ferro Carril Oeste	Buenos Aires	—	Ricardo Etcheverri	24,442
Flandria	Jáuregui	Buenos Aires	Carlos V	5,000
Gimnasia y Esgrima	Jujuy	Jujuy	23 de Agosto	23,200
Gimnasia y Esgrima	Mendoza	Mendoza	Víctor Legrotaglie	11,500
Güemes	Santiago del Estero	Santiago del Estero	Arturo Miranda	15,000
Guillermo Brown	Puerto Madryn	Chubut	Raúl Conti	15,000
Independiente Rivadavia	Mendoza	Mendoza	Bautista Gargantini	24,000
Mitre	Santiago del Estero	Santiago del Estero	José y Antonio Castiglione	10,500
Nueva Chicago	Buenos Aires	—	Nueva Chicago	28,500
Patronato	Paraná	Entre Ríos	Presbítero Bartolomé Grella	22,000
Quilmes	Quilmes	Buenos Aires	Centenario	35,200
Racing	Córdoba	Córdoba	Miguel Sancho	15,000
San Martín	San Juan	San Juan	Ingeniero Hilario Sánchez	17,000
San Martín	Tucumán	Tucumán	La Ciudadela	30,250
San Telmo	Dock Sud	Buenos Aires	Osvaldo Baletto	2,000
Temperley	Temperley	Buenos Aires	Alfredo Beranger	13,000
Tristán Suárez	Tristán Suárez	Buenos Aires	20 de Octubre	15,000
Villa Dálmine	Campana	Buenos Aires	El Coliseo de Mitre y Puccini	12,000

== Zone A ==
=== Standings ===
Pos	Team	Pld	W	D	L	GF	GA	GD	Pts	Qualification or relegation
1	Almirante Brown	36	17	10	9	36	30	+6	61	Advance to Final and qualification for Copa Argentina
2	Agropecuario Argentino	36	17	8	11	46	36	+10	59	Advance to Torneo Reducido and qualification for Copa Argentina
3	San Martín (T)	36	15	11	10	38	24	+14	56	Advance to Torneo Reducido and qualification for Copa Argentina
4	Estudiantes (RC)	36	16	7	13	34	32	+2	55	Advance to Torneo Reducido and qualification for Copa Argentina
5	Defensores de Belgrano	36	15	8	13	44	35	+9	53	Advance to Torneo Reducido and qualification for Copa Argentina
6	Gimnasia y Esgrima (M)	36	13	14	9	45	37	+8	53	Advance to Torneo Reducido and qualification for Copa Argentina
7	San Martín (SJ)	36	14	11	11	44	38	+6	53	Advance to Torneo Reducido and qualification for Copa Argentina
8	Temperley	36	13	14	9	42	38	+4	53	Advance to Torneo Reducido and qualification for Copa Argentina
9	Güemes	36	13	14	9	37	34	+3	53	
10	Deportivo Morón	36	14	11	11	38	37	+1	53	
11	Nueva Chicago	36	13	13	10	34	25	+9	52	
12	Defensores Unidos	36	12	11	13	30	31	−1	47	
13	Alvarado	36	10	14	12	35	40	−5	44	
14	Patronato	36	11	9	16	39	44	−5	42	
15	All Boys	36	10	12	14	31	40	−9	42	
16	Guillermo Brown (Note: Guillermo Brown were deducted three points due to an assault on referee Adrián Franklin in their match against Defensores de Belgrano.)	36	10	11	15	35	42	−7	38	
17	Almagro	36	9	10	17	26	36	−10	37	
18	San Telmo	36	10	7	19	40	52	−12	37	
19	Flandria (R)	36	9	7	20	33	56	−23	34	Relegation to Primera B Metropolitana

Source: AFA
Rules for classification: 1) points; 2) play-off (only for deciding promotion or relegation); 3) goal difference; 4) goals scored; 5) head-to-head points; 6) head-to-head goal difference; 7) head-to-head goals scored.
(R) Relegated

=== Relegation play-off tiebreaker ===
Since Almagro and San Telmo ended up tied in points for 18th place, a tiebreaker match would be played to decide the team that would play the relegation play-off. Since the third relegation from the league was voided, this match was cancelled.

28 October 2023
15:30 UTC−3

Almagro	Cancelled	San Telmo

Estadio Ciudad de Vicente López, Florida

=== Results ===
Home \ Away	AGA	ALL	ALM	CAB	ALV	DBE	DUN	DMO	ERC	FLA	GEM	GÜE	GBR	NCH	PAT	SMA	SMT	STE	TEM
Agropecuario Argentino	—	1–1	1–1	4–0	3–1	2–1	2–0	3–1	0–0	3–0	0–0	1–0	1–0	2–1	2–1	4–1	0–0	2–1	1–3
All Boys	2–0	—	0–0	2–1	2–1	2–1	1–0	0–2	1–2	1–0	3–1	0–2	1–1	1–1	0–1	1–1	0–1	1–0	1–1
Almagro	0–1	0–0	—	0–1	1–1	2–1	1–0	0–1	1–0	3–1	0–0	1–1	2–0	0–0	2–1	0–3	0–0	2–0	2–0
Almirante Brown	4–1	3–0	1–0	—	1–0	0–0	0–0	0–1	0–2	3–1	1–1	0–1	0–0	1–0	2–0	2–1	1–0	1–0	2–0
Alvarado	1–2	0–0	0–0	0–1	—	0–0	4–2	0–2	2–1	2–0	1–1	2–1	2–0	1–0	2–0	0–0	1–1	1–0	0–1
Defensores de Belgrano	1–0	1–0	1–0	0–1	1–1	—	1–2	0–1	1–0	4–2	1–0	4–1	4–1	0–0	2–0	0–1	2–1	2–0	1–1
Defensores Unidos	2–0	3–1	1–0	0–1	0–0	1–0	—	2–0	0–1	0–0	1–0	1–0	2–1	0–0	1–1	0–0	1–0	3–2	1–1
Deportivo Morón	2–1	0–0	0–1	2–2	1–1	3–2	1–0	—	2–0	2–1	2–2	1–1	0–0	1–0	0–1	1–0	0–0	1–2	2–0
Estudiantes (RC)	2–1	1–2	1–0	2–0	1–1	1–0	1–0	2–1	—	2–0	1–1	1–1	1–0	1–2	2–1	3–2	0–1	2–2	1–0
Flandria	2–1	2–1	1–0	0–2	0–0	1–2	0–2	2–0	1–0	—	1–1	3–1	2–1	0–1	1–1	1–1	2–1	1–4	2–3
Gimnasia y Esgrima (M)	2–1	0–0	4–3	4–1	3–1	1–0	1–1	2–2	1–0	0–0	—	0–1	5–0	2–1	0–0	2–0	1–0	2–1	1–1
Güemes	0–1	1–1	1–0	0–0	0–2	0–0	1–1	0–0	1–0	1–1	1–0	—	1–1	1–0	1–0	4–0	0–1	1–1	2–0
Guillermo Brown	1–0	2–1	1–1	0–0	2–0	0–1 (Note: Match suspended at half-time and awarded to Defensores de Belgrano due to an assault on referee Adrián Franklin.)	3–0	0–2	0–1	3–1	1–2	4–1	—	0–2	0–0	1–0	3–0	1–1	2–2
Nueva Chicago	0–1	2–0	2–0	3–0	1–4	2–1	0–0	0–0	2–0	1–0	2–2	1–2	3–2	—	1–1	0–0	1–0	2–0	0–0
Patronato	1–1	3–2	1–0	0–1	6–0	1–2	1–0	3–2	1–1	3–1	1–0	1–2	0–0	0–0	—	1–2	1–3	1–0	3–1
San Martín (SJ)	1–1	2–0	3–0	1–1	1–1	1–3	3–2	4–0	2–0	2–0	0–1	0–0	2–1	0–0	2–1	—	0–0	1–2	3–1
San Martín (T)	1–1	2–1	1–0	0–0	2–0	3–1	1–0	2–0	0–0	2–0	4–0	1–1	0–1	1–1	2–0	4–1	—	1–0	1–1
San Telmo	0–1	0–1	3–2	3–1	1–1	2–2	1–1	2–1	0–1	2–1	3–2	1–2	1–2	0–2	3–1	0–2	2–1	—	0–0
Temperley	2–0	1–1	3–1	1–1	2–1	1–1	1–0	1–1	2–0	0–2	1–0	3–3	0–0	1–0	3–1	0–1	1–0	3–0	—

Source: AFA
Legend: Blue = home team win; Yellow = draw; Red = away team win.

== Zone B ==
=== Standings ===
Pos	Team	Pld	W	D	L	GF	GA	GD	Pts	Qualification or relegation
1	Independiente Rivadavia (P)	34	20	8	6	51	33	+18	68	Advance to Final and qualification for Copa Argentina
2	Chacarita Juniors	34	18	13	3	48	23	+25	67	Advance to Torneo Reducido and qualification for Copa Argentina
3	Deportivo Maipú	34	19	6	9	46	31	+15	63	Advance to Torneo Reducido and qualification for Copa Argentina
4	Quilmes	34	15	8	11	44	31	+13	53	Advance to Torneo Reducido and qualification for Copa Argentina
5	Atlético de Rafaela	34	14	11	9	38	31	+7	53	Advance to Torneo Reducido and qualification for Copa Argentina
6	Mitre (SdE)	34	15	7	12	38	37	+1	52	Advance to Torneo Reducido and qualification for Copa Argentina
7	Deportivo Riestra (P)	34	12	14	8	40	34	+6	50	Advance to Torneo Reducido and qualification for Copa Argentina
8	Ferro Carril Oeste	34	13	10	11	45	37	+8	49	Advance to Torneo Reducido
9	Brown (A)	34	11	14	9	34	31	+3	47	
10	Gimnasia y Esgrima (J)	34	13	5	16	36	40	−4	44	
11	Deportivo Madryn	34	10	13	11	28	28	0	43	
12	Racing (C)	34	10	11	13	44	43	+1	41	
13	Chaco For Ever	34	11	7	16	30	43	−13	40	
14	Estudiantes (BA)	34	8	12	14	31	40	−9	36	
15	Atlanta	34	8	11	15	33	41	−8	35	
16	Aldosivi	34	8	11	15	33	44	−11	35	
17	Tristán Suárez	34	8	10	16	36	53	−17	34	
18	Villa Dálmine (R)	34	5	5	24	21	56	−35	20	Relegation to Primera B Metropolitana

Source: AFA
Rules for classification: 1) points; 2) play-off (only for deciding promotion or relegation); 3) goal difference; 4) goals scored; 5) head-to-head points; 6) head-to-head goal difference; 7) head-to-head goals scored.
(P) Promoted; (R) Relegated

=== Results ===
Home \ Away	ALD	ATL	ATR	BRO	CHA	CFE	DEM	DMA	DRI	EBA	FCO	GEJ	IND	MIT	QUI	RAC	TRI	VDA
Aldosivi	—	0–1	0–1	2–1	0–1	2–0	0–0	1–1	1–1	1–1	1–2	3–1	1–2	3–1	1–2	3–1	1–1	1–1
Atlanta	0–0	—	0–0	1–2	0–1	4–0	1–1	1–3	1–1	3–2	1–1	1–2	2–2	0–1	0–1	2–2	3–2	2–1
Atlético de Rafaela	2–2	1–0	—	0–0	1–1	1–3	0–0	2–0	0–1	1–1	1–2	1–0	1–3	0–1	1–0	2–1	3–0	1–0
Brown (A)	2–0	2–1	1–1	—	1–2	1–2	3–1	1–1	1–1	1–1	1–1	1–0	0–0	0–0	1–0	1–2	2–1	2–0
Chacarita Juniors	2–0	1–1	3–0	0–0	—	1–0	0–0	2–1	4–2	1–1	3–1	2–1	3–0	1–1	2–2	1–0	1–1	3–0
Chaco For Ever	3–0	1–1	0–1	1–1	1–1	—	0–0	0–1	2–1	2–1	4–2	0–0	2–1	1–0	0–4	2–1	1–1	2–0
Deportivo Madryn	2–1	0–1	0–1	0–0	0–0	1–0	—	2–3	0–3	1–1	1–0	3–1	1–1	0–2	0–0	1–0	1–0	4–0
Deportivo Maipú	3–2	1–0	1–1	1–0	0–2	2–0	0–0	—	1–1	2–0	1–0	3–2	0–1	2–1	1–0	2–1	3–2	2–1
Deportivo Riestra	3–0	1–0	0–2	2–1	0–1	0–0	0–0	1–0	—	2–1	1–1	2–1	3–3	0–0	1–1	2–2	2–0	2–1
Estudiantes (BA)	0–1	2–0	1–1	1–1	2–1	3–0	0–3	0–0	1–0	—	1–2	1–2	0–0	0–1	1–1	1–1	0–2	1–0
Ferro Carril Oeste	0–0	2–0	0–1	1–0	0–0	2–1	0–0	0–1	2–2	0–2	—	3–0	1–1	3–0	2–3	3–1	2–1	3–0
Gimnasia y Esgrima (J)	1–1	2–0	1–0	1–1	2–0	2–0	1–0	1–0	0–1	1–2	1–1	—	1–3	2–0	0–1	1–0	1–0	2–0
Independiente Rivadavia	2–1	1–1	2–1	0–2	1–0	1–0	1–0	2–1	1–0	2–1	2–1	2–1	—	4–1	2–0	1–1	1–3	1–0
Mitre (SdE)	0–2	2–0	2–1	3–0	1–2	2–0	1–0	1–0	1–1	3–0	0–2	1–1	2–1	—	1–0	1–1	0–1	3–1
Quilmes	4–1	1–2	1–2	1–1	1–1	1–0	2–0	0–2	3–1	2–0	1–0	2–1	0–1	1–3	—	1–2	5–1	2–0
Racing (C)	2–0	1–1	3–3	1–2	1–1	2–0	3–1	1–0	1–0	0–1	1–1	2–0	2–0	4–2	0–1	—	1–1	0–0
Tristán Suárez	0–0	1–0	0–0	2–0	1–3	2–1	1–2	0–4	0–0	1–1	2–4	1–2	0–3	3–0	0–0	3–2	—	1–1
Villa Dálmine	0–1	0–2	1–4	0–1	0–1	0–1	1–3	2–3	1–2	1–0	2–0	2–1	0–3	0–0	0–0	2–1	3–1	—

Source: AFA
Legend: Blue = home team win; Yellow = draw; Red = away team win.

== Championship final ==
The top-ranked teams of each zone played a match on neutral ground to decide the champions and the first team promoted to Primera División. The losing team entered the Torneo Reducido in the second round.

29 October 2023
18:00 UTC−3

Almirante Brown	0–2 (a.e.t.)	Independiente Rivadavia
	Report 1 Report 2	Sánchez 114'; Ramis 118'

Estadio Mario Alberto Kempes, Córdoba
Referee: Nicolás Ramírez

Team details

Almirante Brown
Independiente Rivadavia

GK	1	(Argentina) Ramiro Martínez
DF	4	(Argentina) Ulises Abreliano	Booked	Substituted off
DF	2	(Argentina) Agustín Dattola
DF	6	(Argentina) Alan Barrionuevo
DF	3	(Argentina) Jonathan Zacaría	Booked	Substituted off
MF	7	(Argentina) Leandro Guzmán		Substituted off
MF	5	(Argentina) Marcos Enrique	Booked
MF	8	(Argentina) Juan Manuel Vázquez	Booked	Substituted off
FW	11	(Argentina) Mariano Santiago
FW	10	(Argentina) Nazareno Bazán		Substituted off
FW	9	(Argentina) Martín Batallini		Substituted off
Substitutions:
DF	14	(Argentina) Axel Ochoa		Substituted in
FW	15	(Argentina) Matías Belloso		Substituted in
MF	17	(Argentina) José Luis Escurra		Substituted in
FW	18	(Argentina) Germán Rivero		Substituted in
MF	20	(Argentina) Diego García		Substituted in
FW	23	(Argentina) Facundo Miño		Substituted in
Manager:
(Argentina) Darío Franco

GK	1	(Argentina) Maximiliano Gagliardo
DF	4	(Argentina) Luciano Abecasis
DF	2	(Argentina) Francisco Petrasso
DF	6	(Argentina) Mauro Maidana
DF	3	(Argentina) Juan Manuel Elordi	Booked
MF	8	(Argentina) Ezequiel Ham		Substituted off
MF	5	(Argentina) Franco Romero
MF	11	(Argentina) Maximiliano González	Booked	Substituted off
FW	7	(Argentina) Jonás Aguirre	Booked	Substituted off
FW	9	(Paraguay) Alex Arce		Substituted off
MF	10	(Argentina) Alejo Distaulo	Booked	Substituted off
Substitutions:
DF	14	(Argentina) Santiago Flores		Substituted in
FW	18	(Paraguay) Ivan Valdez		Substituted in Substituted off
FW	20	(Argentina) Francisco Ilarregui		Substituted in
MF	21	(Argentina) Brian Sánchez		(substituted in) (yellow card) (yellow-red card)
FW	22	(Argentina) Victorio Ramis		Substituted in
Manager:
(Argentina) Alfredo Berti

== Torneo Reducido ==
The teams placing second to eighth place in each zone, along with the loser of the championship final play the Torneo Reducido for the second and last promotion berth to Primera División, in which teams were seeded in each round according to their final placement in the first stage of the tournament. The first round was played over a single leg, at the stadium of the higher-seeded team. The second round (in which the championship final loser entered the Reducido) and the semi-finals were played over two legs, with the higher-seeded team hosting the second leg, whilst the final was played as a single match on neutral ground. In all rounds except for the final, the higher-seeded team advanced in case of a tie, with extra time and a penalty shoot-out set to be played in case of a draw in the final.

=== First round ===
27 October 2023	San Martín (T)	0–1	Deportivo Riestra	San Miguel de Tucumán
21:10 UTC−3		Report	Romero 33'	Stadium: La Ciudadela; Referee: Diego Ceballos

28 October 2023	Chacarita Juniors	1–2	Temperley	Villa Maipú
17:30 UTC−3	Beltramone 12'	Report	Arregui 24'; Nieto 49'	Stadium: Chacarita Juniors; Referee: Mario Ejarque

28 October 2023	Agropecuario Argentino	0–2	Ferro Carril Oeste	Carlos Casares
18:00 UTC−3		Report	Díaz 18'; Mosca 84'	Stadium: Ofelia Rosenzuaig; Referee: Pablo Giménez

28 October 2023	Quilmes	1–0	Gimnasia y Esgrima (M)	Quilmes
21:30 UTC−3	Río 83'	Report		Stadium: Centenario Ciudad de Quilmes; Referee: José Carreras
Note: Match suspended at halftime with the score at 0–0 due to an aggression on Gimnasia y Esgrima goalkeeper Brian Olivera. The second half resumed on 4 November 2023 (originally 3 November 2023), 15:00 local time at Estadio Ciudad de Vicente López, Florida behind closed doors.

29 October 2023	Deportivo Maipú	1–0	San Martín (SJ)	Maipú
16:00 UTC−3	Agorreca 25'	Report		Stadium: Omar Higinio Sperdutti; Referee: Fabricio Llobet

29 October 2023	Estudiantes (RC)	1–0	Mitre (SdE)	Río Cuarto
19:00 UTC−3	Cainelli 5'	Report		Stadium: Antonio Candini; Referee: Nelson Sosa

30 October 2023	Atlético de Rafaela	1–0	Defensores de Belgrano	Rafaela
21:30 UTC−3	Bieler 66'	Report		Stadium: Nuevo Monumental; Referee: Juan Pafundi

=== Second round ===
Team 1	Agg.	Team 2	1st leg	2nd leg
Ferro Carril Oeste	1–1	Almirante Brown (bsr)	1–1	0–0
Temperley	2–3	Deportivo Maipú	2–1	0–2
Deportivo Riestra	2–1	Quilmes	1–1	1–0
Atlético de Rafaela	0–0	Estudiantes (RC) (bsr)	0–0	0–0

==== First leg ====
5 November 2023	Temperley	2–1	Deportivo Maipú	Turdera
16:00 UTC−3	Krüger 53'; Mazur 62'	Report	González 68'	Stadium: Alfredo Beranger; Referee: Sebastián Zunino

5 November 2023	Ferro Carril Oeste	1–1	Almirante Brown	Buenos Aires
18:00 UTC−3	Mosca 80'	Report	Bazán 46'	Stadium: Arquitecto Ricardo Etcheverri; Referee: Yamil Possi

7 November 2023	Deportivo Riestra	1–1	Quilmes	Buenos Aires
15:30 UTC−3	Romero 58'	Report	Río 66'	Stadium: Guillermo Laza; Referee: Sebastián Martínez

8 November 2023	Atlético de Rafaela	0–0	Estudiantes (RC)	Rafaela
21:05 UTC−3		Report		Stadium: Nuevo Monumental; Referee: Carlos Córdoba

==== Second leg ====
11 November 2023	Almirante Brown (bsr)	0–0 (1–1 agg.)	Ferro Carril Oeste	Isidro Casanova
16:15 UTC−3		Report		Stadium: Fragata Presidente Sarmiento; Referee: Jorge Baliño

12 November 2023	Deportivo Maipú	2–0 (3–2 agg.)	Temperley	Maipú
14:30 UTC−3	González 38'; Sambueza 82' (pen.)	Report		Stadium: Omar Higinio Sperdutti; Referee: Darío Herrera

13 November 2023	Quilmes	0–1 (1–2 agg.)	Deportivo Riestra	Quilmes
19:00 UTC−3		Report	Goitía 35'	Stadium: Centenario Ciudad de Quilmes; Referee: Luis Lobo Medina

13 November 2023	Estudiantes (RC) (bsr)	0–0 (0–0 agg.)	Atlético de Rafaela	Río Cuarto
21:05 UTC−3		Report		Stadium: Antonio Candini; Referee: Pablo Giménez

=== Semi-finals ===
Team 1	Agg.	Team 2	1st leg	2nd leg
Deportivo Riestra	4–0	Almirante Brown	2–0	2–0
Estudiantes (RC)	1–1	Deportivo Maipú (bsr)	0–0	1–1

==== First leg ====
20 November 2023	Deportivo Riestra	2–0	Almirante Brown	Buenos Aires
17:00 UTC−3	Tovo 57'; Fernández 64'	Report		Stadium: Guillermo Laza; Referee: Ariel Penel

22 November 2023	Estudiantes (RC)	0–0	Deportivo Maipú	Río Cuarto
19:00 UTC−3		Report		Stadium: Antonio Candini; Referee: Nazareno Araza

==== Second leg ====
26 November 2023	Almirante Brown	0–2 (0–4 agg.)	Deportivo Riestra	Isidro Casanova
17:00 UTC−3		Report	Goitía 33'; Dematei 73'	Stadium: Fragata Presidente Sarmiento; Referee: Pablo Giménez

26 November 2023	Deportivo Maipú (bsr)	1–1 (1–1 agg.)	Estudiantes (RC)	Maipú
17:00 UTC−3	Sambueza 90+5'	Report	Villalba 42'	Stadium: Omar Higinio Sperdutti; Referee: Nicolás Lamolina

=== Final ===
The winner was the second and last team promoted to Primera División for the 2024 season.

Torneo Reducido Final
(2nd. Promotion playoff)
2 December 2023
17:00 UTC−3

Deportivo Riestra	1–0	Deportivo Maipú
Fernández 60'	Report

Estadio Presidente Perón, Córdoba
Referee: Darío Herrera

Team details

Deportivo Riestra
Deportivo Maipú

GK	1	(Argentina) Ignacio Arce	Booked
DF	2	(Argentina) Jonatan Goitía		Substituted off
DF	3	(Argentina) Eric Tovo
DF	4	(Argentina) Nahuel Iribarren
DF	5	(Argentina) Jonathan Goya		Substituted off
MF	6	(Argentina) Nicolás Dematei	Booked	Substituted off
MF	7	(Argentina) Fermín Antonini	Booked
MF	8	(Argentina) Milton Céliz (c)
FW	9	(Argentina) Lázaro Romero	Booked	Substituted off
FW	10	(Argentina) Walter Acuña		Substituted off
FW	11	(Argentina) Gustavo Fernández	Booked
Substitutions:
DF	14	(Uruguay) Emilio MacEachen		Substituted in
DF	16	(Argentina) Diego Magallanes		Substituted in
DF	17	(Argentina) Tomás Villoldo		Substituted in
MF	18	(Argentina) Leonardo Landriel		Substituted in
FW	20	(Argentina) Ramón González Herrero		Substituted in
Manager:
(Argentina) Matías Módolo

GK	1	(Argentina) Juan Pablo Cozzani
DF	4	(Argentina) Santiago Moyano	Substituted off
DF	2	(Argentina) Felipe Coronel	Substituted off
DF	6	(Argentina) Imanol González
DF	3	(Argentina) Guillermo Ferracuti	Substituted off
MF	8	(Argentina) Fausto Montero	Substituted off
MF	7	(Argentina) Agustín Manzur
FW	11	(Argentina) Luciano Herrera
MF	10	(Argentina) Rubens Sambueza (c)
FW	7	(Argentina) Santiago González
FW	9	(Argentina) Ezequiel Almirón	Substituted off
Substitutions:
DF	16	(Argentina) Luciano Paredes	Substituted in
MF	19	(Argentina) Marcelo Eggel	Substituted in Booked
FW	20	(Argentina) Emiliano Ozuna	Substituted in
FW	21	(Argentina) Gonzalo Klusener	Substituted in
FW	22	(Chile) Marcelo Larrondo	Substituted in Booked
Manager:
(Argentina) Luis Osvaldo García

== Relegation play-off ==
The teams placing second-from-bottom in each zone would play a match on neutral ground to decide the third and last relegated team. The losing team would be relegated to Primera B Metropolitana or Torneo Federal A according to their affiliation to AFA. Since the third relegation from the league was voided, this match was cancelled.

Zone A relegation play-off tiebreaker loser	Cancelled	Tristán Suárez

== Copa Argentina qualification ==
Fifteen Primera Nacional teams qualified for the round of 32 of the 2024 Copa Argentina, which were the top seven teams of each zone and the best eighth-placed team at the end of the season, which was selected according to points earned per game, goal difference, goals scored, and a drawing of lots if needed.

=== Ranking of eighth-placed teams ===
Pos	Grp	Team	Pld	W	D	L	GF	GA	GD	Pts	PPG	Qualification
1	A	Temperley	36	13	14	9	42	38	+4	53	1.47	Qualification for Copa Argentina
2	B	Ferro Carril Oeste	34	13	10	11	45	37	+8	49	1.44	

Source: AFA
Rules for classification: 1) Points per game; 2) Goal difference; 3) Goals scored; 4) Drawing of lots.

== Season statistics ==
=== Top scorers ===
Rank	Player	Club	Goals
1	(Paraguay) Alex Arce	Independiente Rivadavia	25
2	(Argentina) Gabriel Benegas	Defensores de Belgrano	18
3	(Argentina) Emanuel Dening	San Martín (T)	15
4	(Argentina) Claudio Bieler	Atlético de Rafaela	14
4	(Argentina) Martín Pino	Guillermo Brown	14
4	(Argentina) Lázaro Romero	Deportivo Riestra	14
7	(Argentina) Alejandro Melo	Agropecuario Argentino	13
7	(Argentina) Luciano Giménez	Chacarita Juniors	13
7	(Argentina) Lucas González	Deportivo Madryn	13
7	(Argentina) Franco Coronel	Racing (C)	13

== See also ==
- 2023 Argentine Primera División
- 2023 Torneo Federal A
- 2023 Copa Argentina
