= 2025 Deportivo Riestra season =

Deportivo Riestra
2025 season
- Manager: Gustavo Benítez (caretaker, from 18 February)
- Stadium: Estadio Guillermo Laza
- Primera División: Torneo Apertura: 5th
- Copa Argentina: Round of 16
- Top goalscorer: League: Jonathan Herrera (4); All: Jonathan Herrera (4)

The 2025 season is the 94th in the history of Deportivo Riestra and the club’s second consecutive in the Argentine top flight. They are also participating in the Copa Argentina, having advanced past San Telmo on penalties in the first round.

== Competitions ==
=== Primera División ===
==== Torneo Apertura ====
Pos	Team	Pld	W	D	L	GF	GA	GD	Pts	Qualification
3	Independiente	16	8	5	3	23	12	+11	29	Advance to round of 16
4	San Lorenzo	16	7	6	3	14	10	+4	27	Advance to round of 16
5	Deportivo Riestra	16	5	9	2	13	7	+6	24	Advance to round of 16
6	Platense	16	6	5	5	13	11	+2	23	Advance to round of 16
7	Lanús	16	4	8	4	13	11	+2	20	Advance to round of 16

Source: AFA

===== Results by round =====
Round	1	2	3	4	5
Ground	A	H	A	H	H
Result	W	D	W	D	D
Position					

A = Away; H = Home; W = Win; D = Draw; L = Loss

23 January 2025 1	Lanús	0–2	Deportivo Riestra

28 January 2025 2	Deportivo Riestra	0–0	San Martín San Juan

5 February 2025 3	Atlético Tucumán	0–3	Deportivo Riestra

9 February 2025 4	Deportivo Riestra	1–1	Defensa y Justicia

12 February 2025 5	Deportivo Riestra	0–0	Rosario Central

==== Torneo Clausura ====
===== League table =====
Pos	Team	Pld	W	D	L	GF	GA	GD	Pts	Qualification
1	Rosario Central	16	8	7	1	18	8	+10	31	Advance to round of 16
2	Lanús	16	9	3	4	20	13	+7	30	Advance to round of 16
3	Deportivo Riestra	16	8	4	4	19	12	+7	28	Advance to round of 16
4	Vélez Sarsfield	16	7	5	4	19	12	+7	26	Advance to round of 16
5	San Lorenzo	16	6	6	4	13	11	+2	24	Advance to round of 16

Source: AFA

===== Matches =====
13 July 2025 1	Deportivo Riestra	1–0	Lanús	Buenos Aires
--:-- UTC−3	Herrera 79'	Report		Stadium: Estadio Guillermo Laza

21 July 2025 2	San Martín	3–2	Deportivo Riestra	San Juan
16:30 UTC−3	Tijanovich 29', 58' (pen.); Salle 79'	Report	Céliz 41'; Obredor 90'	Stadium: Estadio Ingeniero Hilario Sánchez

28 July 2025 3	Deportivo Riestra	1–0	Atlético Tucumán	Buenos Aires
16:00 UTC−3	Herrera 78' (pen.)	Report		Stadium: Estadio Guillermo Laza

11 August 2025 4	Defensa y Justicia	1–0	Deportivo Riestra	Gobernador Costa
19:00 UTC−3	Osorio 90+3'	Report		Stadium: Estadio Norberto "Tito" Tomaghello

16 August 2025 5	Rosario Central	1–1	Deportivo Riestra	Rosario
18:30 UTC−3	Véliz 9'	Report	Herrera 89' (pen.)	Stadium: Estadio Gigante de Arroyito

25 August 2025 6	Deportivo Riestra	3–0	Sarmiento	Buenos Aires
15:00 UTC−3	Paz 18'; Herrera 69'; Benegas 88'	Report		Stadium: Estadio Guillermo Laza

31 August 2025 7	Talleres	0–1	Deportivo Riestra	Córdoba
16:45 UTC−3		Report	Goitía 76'	Stadium: Estadio Mario Alberto Kempes

12 September 2025 8	Deportivo Riestra	2–0	Central Córdoba	Buenos Aires
14:30 UTC−3	Alonso 33'; Goitía 70'	Report		Stadium: Estadio Guillermo Laza

19 September 2025 9	Deportivo Riestra	1–0	Gimnasia y Esgrima	Buenos Aires
17:00 UTC−3	Céliz 54'	Report		Stadium: Estadio Guillermo Laza

===== Final stages =====
24 November 2025 Round of 16	Deportivo Riestra	0–1 (a.e.t.)	Barracas Central	Buenos Aires
17:00		Report	Blandi 115'	Stadium: Estadio Guillermo Laza; Referee: Nicolás Ramírez

=== Copa Argentina ===
5 March 2025 First round	Deportivo Riestra	2–2 (3–1 p)	San Telmo	Caseros
17:10 UTC−3	Guille 18'; Sánchez 45+2'	Report	Cocimano 57', 62'	Stadium: Estadio Ciudad de Caseros; Referee: Juan Pafundi
	Penalties
	Bracamonte (penalty scored); Murillo (penalty scored); Guille (penalty scored)		(penalty missed) Cocimano; (penalty missed) Yangali; (penalty scored) Pusula; (penalty missed) Morro

24 May 2025 Round of 32	Deportivo Riestra	2–2 (4–3 p)	Deportivo Armenio	Caseros
12:30	Sánchez 21'; P. Ramírez 76'	Report	Sica 6'; Maldonado 60'	Stadium: Estadio Ciudad de Caseros; Referee: Ariel Penel
	Penalties
	Benegas (penalty scored); Bracamonte (penalty scored); Fagúndez (penalty scored); P. Ramírez (penalty scored)		(penalty missed) Almanza; (penalty scored) Pérez; (penalty scored) Cardozo; (penalty scored) Medina; (penalty missed) Motta

3 August 2025 Round of 16	Racing	3–0	Deportivo Riestra	Lanús
16:00	Vergara 10' (pen.); Barbieri 26' (o.g.); Mura 32'	Report		Stadium: Ciudad de Lanús – Néstor Díaz Pérez; Referee: Nazareno Arasa
