= Nicolás González =

Nicolás González may refer to:

- Nicolás González Casares, Spanish member of the European Parliament
- Nicolás González (cyclist) (born 1997), Chilean cyclist
- Nicolás González Errázuriz (1859–1930), Chilean lawyer and politician
- Nicolás González (footballer, born 1992) (Nicolás Antonio González), Argentine footballer
- Nicolás González (footballer, born 1994) (Nicolás Adrián González Szoke), Argentine footballer
- Nicolás González (footballer, born 1995) (Fernando Nicolás González Ureta), Uruguayan footballer
- Nicolás González (footballer, born 1996) (Nicolás González Fernández), Spanish footballer
- Nicolás González (footballer, born 1997) (Daniel Nicolás González Álvarez), Uruguayan footballer
- Nicolás González (footballer, born 1998) (Nicolás Iván González), Argentine footballer
- Nicolás González (footballer, born 1999) (José Nicolás González), Argentine footballer
- Nico González (footballer, born 1988) (Francisco José Nicolás González), Spanish footballer
- Nico González (footballer, born 2002) (Nicolás González Iglesias), Spanish footballer

== See also ==
- Nico (disambiguation)
