= Arturo Ordano =

Paraguayan footballer (born 1994)

Personal information
- Full name: Pablo Arturo Ordano Saucedo
- Date of birth: 21 May 1994 (age 32)
- Place of birth: Paraguay
- Height: 1.72 m (5 ft 8 in)
- Position: Defender

Team information
- Current team: Defensores Unidos

Youth career
- Nueva Chicago
- Deportivo Riestra
- 2006–2013: Deportivo Laferrere

Senior career*
Years	Team	Apps	(Gls)
2013–2018	Deportivo Laferrere	149	(8)
2018–	Defensores Unidos	33	(0)
- * Club domestic league appearances and goals as of 01:10, 14 May 2019 (UTC)

Pablo Arturo Ordano Saucedo (born 21 May 1994) is a Paraguayan professional footballer who plays as a defender for Defensores Unidos.

== Career ==
Ordano, though born in Paraguay, started his career in neighbouring Argentina. He played in the youth set-ups of Nueva Chicago and Deportivo Riestra, prior to signing with Deportivo Laferrere in 2006. Seven years later, Ordano made the breakthrough into senior football with the Primera C Metropolitana outfit. Nine matches arrived in his debut season of 2012–13 as they placed second, which was the start of one hundred and fifty-two appearances in all competitions for them whilst also scoring eight times; the first came against Ferrocarril Midland in 2015, while the last two arrived in a fixture with Ituzaingó. Ordano decided to leave in 2018.

On 30 June 2018, Ordano joined Defensores Unidos of Primera B Metropolitana. His opening appearances for the Zárate team occurred in the Copa Argentina against Primera División duo Godoy Cruz and Newell's Old Boys.

== Personal life ==
Ordano is the brother-in-law of Raúl Nieva, who played professionally for Deportivo Laferrere.

== Career statistics ==
As of 14 May 2019.

Appearances and goals by club, season and competition
Club	Season	League			Cup		League Cup		Continental		Other		Total	
Club	Season	Division	Apps	Goals	Apps	Goals	Apps	Goals	Apps	Goals	Apps	Goals	Apps	Goals
Deportivo Laferrere	2012–13	Primera C Metropolitana	9	0	0	0	—		—		0	0	9	0
Deportivo Laferrere	2013–14	Primera C Metropolitana	24	0	0	0	—		—		0	0	24	0
Deportivo Laferrere	2014	Primera C Metropolitana	10	0	0	0	—		—		0	0	10	0
Deportivo Laferrere	2015	Primera C Metropolitana	35	1	1	0	—		—		0	0	36	1
Deportivo Laferrere	2016	Primera C Metropolitana	15	0	0	0	—		—		0	0	15	0
Deportivo Laferrere	2016–17	Primera C Metropolitana	30	5	2	0	—		—		0	0	32	5
Deportivo Laferrere	2017–18	Primera C Metropolitana	26	2	0	0	—		—		0	0	26	2
Deportivo Laferrere	Total		149	8	3	0	—		—		0	0	152	8
Defensores Unidos	2018–19	Primera B Metropolitana	33	0	2	0	—		—		0	0	35	0
Career total			182	8	5	0	—		—		0	0	187	8
