= Santiago Rivas =

Argentine footballer (born 2000)

Personal information
- Full name: Santiago Agustín Rivas
- Date of birth: 18 September 2000 (age 26)
- Place of birth: Argentina
- Position: Midfielder

Team information
- Current team: Defensores Unidos

Youth career
- Defensores Unidos

Senior career*
Years	Team	Apps	(Gls)
2019–	Defensores Unidos	1	(0)
- * Club domestic league appearances and goals as of 23:47, 23 May 2019 (UTC)

Santiago Agustín Rivas (born 18 September 2000) is an Argentine professional footballer who plays as a midfielder for Defensores Unidos.

== Career ==
Rivas started his senior career with Primera B Metropolitana's Defensores Unidos. He was substituted on for his professional debut on 18 May 2019 versus Flandria after seventy-two minutes, though would depart the 3–1 loss four minutes later having received a red card; he had been substituted on in place of Fernando Magallán.

== Career statistics ==
As of 23 May 2019.

Appearances and goals by club, season and competition
Club	Season	League			Cup		League Cup		Continental		Other		Total	
Club	Season	Division	Apps	Goals	Apps	Goals	Apps	Goals	Apps	Goals	Apps	Goals	Apps	Goals
Defensores Unidos	2018–19	Primera B Metropolitana	1	0	0	0	—		—		0	0	1	0
Career total			1	0	0	0	—		—		0	0	1	0
