= Marcelo Pío =

Argentine footballer (born 1996)

Personal information
- Full name: Marcelo Gabriel Pío
- Date of birth: 13 May 1996 (age 30)
- Place of birth: Argentina
- Position: Forward

Team information
- Current team: Defensores Unidos

Senior career*
Years	Team	Apps	(Gls)
2017–2019	Defensores Unidos	18	(1)
- * Club domestic league appearances and goals

Marcelo Gabriel Pío (born 13 May 1996) is an Argentine professional footballer who plays as a forward.

== Career ==
Pío began his career with Defensores Unidos. His first appearances for the club arrived in the 2017–18 Primera C Metropolitana as he featured seven times, with the campaign ending with promotion as champions to Primera B Metropolitana. He scored his first senior goal in the subsequent season, netting in a draw away from home against Deportivo Riestra on 3 May 2019. Pío was released in June 2019.

== Career statistics ==
As of 7 October 2020.

Appearances and goals by club, season and competition
Club	Season	League			Cup		League Cup		Continental		Other		Total	
Club	Season	Division	Apps	Goals	Apps	Goals	Apps	Goals	Apps	Goals	Apps	Goals	Apps	Goals
Defensores Unidos	2017–18	Primera C Metropolitana	7	0	0	0	—		—		0	0	7	0
Defensores Unidos	2018–19	Primera B Metropolitana	11	1	0	0	—		—		0	0	11	1
Career total			18	1	0	0	—		—		0	0	18	1

== Honours ==
Defensores Unidos

- Primera C Metropolitana: 2017–18
