= Ricardo Priori =

Argentine footballer

Personal information
- Full name: Ricardo Gabriel Priori
- Date of birth: 8 December 1995 (age 30)
- Place of birth: Argentina
- Height: 1.71 m (5 ft 7 in)
- Position: Midfielder

Team information
- Current team: Defensores Unidos

Senior career*
Years	Team	Apps	(Gls)
2016–	Defensores Unidos	85	(1)
- * Club domestic league appearances and goals as of 03:54, 19 May 2019 (UTC)

Ricardo Gabriel Priori (born 8 December 1995) is an Argentine professional footballer who plays as a midfielder for Defensores Unidos.

== Career ==
Defensores Unidos gave Priori his start in senior football. The club won promotion from Primera C Metropolitana in the 2017–18 campaign, after he had appeared sixty-two times and scored once for them since 2016. He made his Primera B Metropolitana debut versus San Telmo on 2 September 2018. In the succeeding February, Priori was sent off on two occasions; in fixtures with Estudiantes and Fénix.

== Career statistics ==
As of 19 May 2019.

Appearances and goals by club, season and competition
Club	Season	League			Cup		League Cup		Continental		Other		Total	
Club	Season	Division	Apps	Goals	Apps	Goals	Apps	Goals	Apps	Goals	Apps	Goals	Apps	Goals
Defensores Unidos	2018–19	Primera B Metropolitana	23	0	1	0	—		—		0	0	24	0
Career total			23	0	1	0	—		—		0	0	24	0

== Honours ==
Defensores Unidos

- Primera C Metropolitana: 2017–18
