= Damián López Samaniego =

Argentine footballer

Personal information
- Full name: Angel Damián López Samaniego
- Date of birth: 13 May 1995 (age 31)
- Place of birth: Argentina
- Height: 1.76 m (5 ft 9 in)
- Position: Midfielder

Youth career
- UAI Urquiza

Senior career*
Years	Team	Apps	(Gls)
2015–2017	UAI Urquiza	20	(1)
2018	Intersoccer Madrid	9	(2)
2019–2021	Defensores Unidos	34	(1)
- * Club domestic league appearances and goals as of 22:59, 18 May 2019 (UTC)

Angel Damián López Samaniego (born 13 May 1995) is an Argentine professional footballer who plays as a midfielder.

== Career ==
López Samaniego started his career with Primera B Metropolitana's UAI Urquiza. His professional debut arrived on 21 March 2015 during a 1–2 win against Comunicaciones, appearing for fifty-one minutes prior to being substituted for Isaac Suárez; a further nine appearances arrived in 2015. He scored his first goal in the subsequent 2016 season, netting in an away fixture with Tristán Suárez on 6 May. In 2018, López Samaniego began featuring for Intersoccer Madrid in Spain's Segunda de Aficionados; the seventh tier of the country's league system. He scored two goals in nine fixtures during 2018–19, though departed mid-season.

A return to Argentina with Defensores Unidos was completed in January 2019.

== Career statistics ==
As of 18 May 2019.

Appearances and goals by club, season and competition
Club	Season	League			Cup		League Cup		Continental		Other		Total	
Club	Season	Division	Apps	Goals	Apps	Goals	Apps	Goals	Apps	Goals	Apps	Goals	Apps	Goals
UAI Urquiza	2015	Primera B Metropolitana	10	0	0	0	—		—		0	0	10	0
UAI Urquiza	2016	Primera B Metropolitana	6	1	0	0	—		—		0	0	6	1
UAI Urquiza	2016–17	Primera B Metropolitana	4	0	0	0	—		—		0	0	4	0
UAI Urquiza	Total		20	1	0	0	—		—		0	0	20	1
Intersoccer Madrid	2018–19	Segunda de Aficionados	9	2	0	0	—		—		0	0	9	2
Defensores Unidos	2018–19	Primera B Metropolitana	16	0	0	0	—		—		0	0	16	0
Career total			45	3	0	0	—		—		0	0	45	3
