= Maximiliano Carnelutto =

Argentine footballer (born 1992)

Personal information
- Date of birth: 14 December 1992 (age 33)
- Place of birth: Argentina
- Height: 1.70 m (5 ft 7 in)
- Position: Defender

Team information
- Current team: Defensores Unidos

Youth career
- Platense
- Colegiales
- Villa Dálmine

Senior career*
Years	Team	Apps	(Gls)
2013–2015	Belgrano de Zárate		
2016–2019	Defensores Unidos	108	(2)
2019–2020	Ferrocarril Midland	16	(0)
2020–	Defensores Unidos	0	(0)
- * Club domestic league appearances and goals as of 21:24, 26 October 2020 (UTC)

Maximiliano Carnelutto (born 14 December 1992) is an Argentine professional footballer who plays as a defender for Defensores Unidos.

== Career ==
Carnelutto spent time in the youth ranks of Platense, Colegiales and Villa Dálmine. He played for Belgrano de Zárate between 2013 and 2015, making ten appearances in the 2013–14 Torneo Argentino B as they suffered relegation. He remained with them in Torneo Federal C. In 2016, Carnelutto joined Primera C Metropolitana side Defensores Unidos. Two goals in seventy-three fixtures arrived in two seasons, with 2017–18 concluding with promotion to Primera B Metropolitana; as he scored the clinching goal. His tier three debut came in a 1–0 loss to UAI Urquiza on 19 August 2018; thirty-six appearances followed.

In July 2019, Carnelutto was signed by Ferrocarril Midland of Primera C Metropolitana. He participated in sixteen matches for them, prior to the COVID-19 pandemic. October 2020 saw Carnelutto rejoin Defensores Unidos.

== Personal life ==
Carnelutto is a graduate of the National Technological University, majoring in mechanical engineering in 2017.

== Career statistics ==
As of 14 May 2019.

Appearances and goals by club, season and competition
Club	Season	League			Cup		League Cup		Continental		Other		Total	
Club	Season	Division	Apps	Goals	Apps	Goals	Apps	Goals	Apps	Goals	Apps	Goals	Apps	Goals
Belgrano de Zárate	2013–14	Torneo Argentino B	10	0	0	0	—		—		0	0	10	0
Defensores Unidos	2018–19	Primera B Metropolitana	35	0	2	0	—		—		0	0	37	0
Ferrocarril Midland	2019–20	Primera C Metropolitana	16	0	0	0	—		—		0	0	16	0
Defensores Unidos	2020–21	Primera B Metropolitana	0	0	0	0	—		—		0	0	0	0
Career total			61	0	2	0	—		—		0	0	63	0

== Honours ==
Defensores Unidos

- Primera C Metropolitana: 2017–18
