= Nahuel Calvo =

Argentine footballer (born 1996)

Personal information
- Full name: Nahuel Oscar Calvo
- Date of birth: 21 August 1996 (age 30)
- Place of birth: Argentina
- Position: Defender

Team information
- Current team: Defensores Unidos

Senior career*
Years	Team	Apps	(Gls)
2016–2020	Defensores Unidos	15	(1)
2020	→ Villa San Antonio (loan)	6	(0)
- * Club domestic league appearances and goals as of 21:54, 2 January 2021 (UTC)

Nahuel Oscar Calvo (born 21 August 1996) is an Argentine professional footballer who plays as a defender for Defensores Unidos.

== Career ==
Calvo began his career with Defensores Unidos in 2016. One goal in fourteen appearances followed across the 2016–17 and 2017–18 seasons in Primera C Metropolitana, with the club winning promotion as champions during the latter. His first Primera B Metropolitana appearance arrived on 18 May 2019 in an away defeat to Flandria; as he featured for the full duration of the final day fixture. In January 2020, Calvo joined Villa San Antonio on a six-month loan deal. He appeared six times in the Torneo Regional Federal Amateur, prior to the season's curtailment due to the COVID-19 pandemic.

In June 2020, Calvo returned to Defensores Unidos and renewed his contract until December.

== Career statistics ==
As of 2 January 2021.

Appearances and goals by club, season and competition
Club	Season	League			Cup		League Cup		Continental		Other		Total	
Club	Season	Division	Apps	Goals	Apps	Goals	Apps	Goals	Apps	Goals	Apps	Goals	Apps	Goals
Defensores Unidos	2018–19	Primera B Metropolitana	1	0	0	0	—		—		0	0	1	0
Defensores Unidos	2019–20	Primera B Metropolitana	0	0	0	0	—		—		0	0	0	0
Defensores Unidos	2020	Primera B Metropolitana	0	0	0	0	—		—		0	0	0	0
Defensores Unidos	Total		1	0	0	0	—		—		0	0	1	0
Villa San Antonio (loan)	2020	Torneo Amateur	6	0	0	0	—		—		0	0	6	0
Career total			7	0	0	0	—		—		0	0	7	0

== Honours ==
Defensores Unidos

- Primera C Metropolitana: 2017–18
