= Almirón =

Almirón is a Spanish-language surname. Notable people with the surname include:

- Ana Claudia Almirón (born 1984), Argentine politician
- Ezequiel Almirón (born 2002), Argentine footballer
- Javier Almirón (born 1980), Argentine footballer
- Jorge Almirón (born 1971), Argentine football manager
- Miguel Almirón (born 1993), Paraguayan footballer
- Oriol Almirón Ruiz (born 2000), Spanish politician
- Óscar Almirón (1927–2009), Argentine rower
- Rodolfo Almirón (1935–2009), Argentine Anticommunist Alliance leader
- Sergio Bernardo Almirón (born 1980), Argentine footballer
- Sergio Omar Almirón (born 1958), Argentine footballer, 1986 FIFA World Cup winner
- Sergio Oscar Almirón (born 1985), Argentine footballer
