= Carlos Olsen =

Argentine footballer

Personal information
- Full name: Carlos Fernando Olsen
- Date of birth: 27 December 1994 (age 31)
- Place of birth: Argentina
- Position: Midfielder

Team information
- Current team: Defensores Unidos

Senior career*
Years	Team	Apps	(Gls)
2014	UOCRA	8	(1)
2015	Atlético Pilar Obrero	4	(0)
2016–2018	Belgrano		
2018–	Defensores Unidos	15	(1)
- * Club domestic league appearances and goals as of 01:32, 19 May 2019 (UTC)

Carlos Fernando Olsen (born 27 December 1994) is an Argentine professional footballer who plays as a midfielder for Defensores Unidos.

== Career ==
Olsen spent the early years of his senior career in Torneo Argentino B with UOCRA and Atlético Pilar Obrero, netting once in eight games for the former before appearing four times for the latter. The two clubs notably merged midway through the two stints, with Olsen the only UOCRA player to be signed over. In June 2018, having featured for Zárate's Belgrano from 2016, Olsen joined Defensores Unidos of Primera B Metropolitana. He made his bow for the club on 19 August versus UAI Urquiza, which preceded his first goal arriving away to Deportivo Español in the succeeding November.

== Career statistics ==
As of 19 May 2019.

Appearances and goals by club, season and competition
Club	Season	League			Cup		League Cup		Continental		Other		Total	
Club	Season	Division	Apps	Goals	Apps	Goals	Apps	Goals	Apps	Goals	Apps	Goals	Apps	Goals
UOCRA	2014	Torneo Argentino B	8	1	0	0	—		—		0	0	8	1
Atlético Pilar Obrero	2015	Torneo Argentino B	4	0	0	0	—		—		0	0	4	0
Defensores Unidos	2018–19	Primera B Metropolitana	15	1	0	0	—		—		0	0	15	1
Career total			27	2	0	0	—		—		0	0	27	2
