= Nicolás Sansotre =

Argentine footballer

Personal information
- Full name: Pedro Nicolás Sansotre
- Date of birth: 8 September 1993 (age 33)
- Place of birth: El Palomar, Argentina
- Height: 1.82 m (6 ft 0 in)
- Position: Right-back

Team information
- Current team: Deportivo Riestra
- Number: 15

Youth career
- Almagro

Senior career*
Years	Team	Apps	(Gls)
2013–2018	Almagro	134	(0)
2018–2020	Villa Dálmine	44	(2)
2020–2021	Tigre	3	(0)
2021–2024	San Martín Tucumán	69	(1)
2024–	Deportivo Riestra	90	(1)
- * Club domestic league appearances and goals as of 17:39, 13 November 2026 (UTC)

Pedro Nicolás Sansotre (born 8 September 1993) is an Argentine professional footballer who plays as a right-back for Deportivo Riestra.

== Career ==
Almagro gave Sansotre his beginning in professional football. He featured in twenty-three Primera B Metropolitana matches in 2013–14, which included his debut on 18 September 2013 away from home versus UAI Urquiza. He received his first senior red card in the same fixture in the succeeding 2014 campaign. 2015 ended with promotion to Primera B Nacional, where they remained for three seasons. Sansotre made a total of one hundred and thirty-nine appearances for them. On 30 June 2018, Sansotre joined fellow tier two team Villa Dálmine. His first senior goal soon came, as he netted in a November draw with Guillermo Brown.

On 29 August 2020, Sansotre joined Tigre He left Tigre again in February 2021, after signing with San Martín de Tucumán.

== Career statistics ==
As of 1 April 2019.

Appearances and goals by club, season and competition
Club	Season	League			Cup		Continental		Other		Total	
Club	Season	Division	Apps	Goals	Apps	Goals	Apps	Goals	Apps	Goals	Apps	Goals
Almagro	2013–14	Primera B Metropolitana	23	0	1	0	—		0	0	24	0
Almagro	2014	Primera B Metropolitana	17	0	0	0	—		0	0	17	0
Almagro	2015	Primera B Metropolitana	24	0	0	0	—		4 (Note: Appearance(s) in the Primera B Metropolitana play-offs)	0	28	0
Almagro	2016	Primera B Nacional	19	0	1	0	—		0	0	20	0
Almagro	2016–17	Primera B Nacional	35	0	3	0	—		0	0	38	0
Almagro	2017–18	Primera B Nacional	11	0	0	0	—		1 (Note: Appearance(s) in the Primera B Nacional play-offs)	0	12	0
Almagro	Total		129	0	5	0	—		5	0	139	0
Villa Dálmine	2018–19	Primera B Nacional	21	1	3	0	—		0	0	24	1
Career total			150	1	8	0	—		5	0	163	1
