= Brian Guerra =

Argentine professional footballer

Personal information
- Full name: Brian Kevin Emmanuel Guerra
- Date of birth: 8 February 1996 (age 30)
- Place of birth: Santa Isabel, Argentina
- Height: 1.74 m (5 ft 9 in)
- Position: Midfielder

Team information
- Current team: Chaco For Ever

Youth career
- All Boys

Senior career*
Years	Team	Apps	(Gls)
2017–2020	All Boys	35	(1)
2019–2020	→ Real Pilar (loan)	3	(0)
2021–2023	Nueva Chicago	45	(6)
2023–2024	Aldosivi	17	(0)
2024–2025	Defensores Unidos	31	(0)
2025–	Chaco For Ever	24	(0)
- * Club domestic league appearances and goals as of 16:41, 25 April 2026 (UTC)

Brian Kevin Emmanuel Guerra (born 8 February 1996) is an Argentine footballer currently playing for Chaco For Ever.

== Career ==
Guerra started with All Boys. He made two appearances throughout the 2016–17 Primera B Nacional campaign, coming off the bench against Instituto on 16 May 2017 before starting a win over Central Córdoba in the succeeding July. Guerra subsequently featured twenty-one times in 2017–18 as they were relegated, with the midfielder netting his first goal versus Mitre on 25 February 2018. Guerra was loaned out to Primera C Metropolitana's Real Pilar in August 2019, subsequently appearing three times.

== Career statistics ==
As of 4 July 2020.

Appearances and goals by club, season and competition
Club	Season	League			Cup		Continental		Other		Total	
Club	Season	Division	Apps	Goals	Apps	Goals	Apps	Goals	Apps	Goals	Apps	Goals
All Boys	2016–17	Primera B Nacional	2	0	0	0	—		0	0	2	0
All Boys	2017–18	Primera B Nacional	21	1	0	0	—		0	0	21	1
All Boys	2018–19	Primera B Metropolitana	12	0	1	0	—		0	0	13	0
All Boys	2019–20	Primera B Nacional	0	0	0	0	—		0	0	0	0
All Boys	Total		35	1	1	0	—		0	0	36	1
Real Pilar (loan)	2019–20	Primera C Metropolitana	3	0	0	0	—		0	0	3	0
Career total			38	1	1	0	—		0	0	39	1
