= Jonathan Goya =

Argentine professional footballer

Personal information
- Full name: Jonathan Javier Goya
- Date of birth: 14 March 1989 (age 37)
- Place of birth: Buenos Aires, Argentina
- Height: 1.80 m (5 ft 11 in)
- Position: Midfielder

Team information
- Current team: Almirante Brown

Youth career
- Deportivo Riestra

Senior career*
Years	Team	Apps	(Gls)
2008–2019	Deportivo Riestra	269	(15)
2019–2020	Almirante Brown	15	(0)
2020–2024	Deportivo Riestra	89	(2)
2025–	Almirante Brown	0	(0)
- * Club domestic league appearances and goals as of 16:15, 11 January 2025 (UTC)

Jonathan Javier Goya (born 14 March 1989) is an Argentine professional footballer who plays as a midfielder for Almirante Brown.

== Career ==
Goya's career in senior football got underway in 2008 with Deportivo Riestra. He scored ten goals in one hundred and forty-three appearances for the club between 2008 and 2014, with the club winning the 2013–14 Primera D Metropolitana title to gain a place in Primera C Metropolitana; where he appeared eighteen times. His first appearance in Primera B Metropolitana arrived on 23 February 2015, as he appeared for fifty minutes of a win over Villa San Carlos; he was substituted off for Daniel Caputo. Thirty-three appearances occurred that season, though three ended prematurely after the defender received a red card in each match.

Goya's first goal at that level came against Talleres in the 2016–17 Primera B Metropolitana, in a campaign which ended with promotion to Primera B Nacional for 2017–18. One goal in eleven fixtures arrived in the second tier, as the club were relegated following a points deduction. After one further season with the club, Goya left in July 2019 to Almirante Brown. However, a year later, in June 2020, he returned to Deportivo Riestra.

== Career statistics ==
As of 15 September 2020.

Appearances and goals by club, season and competition
Club	Season	League			Cup		League Cup		Continental		Other		Total	
Club	Season	Division	Apps	Goals	Apps	Goals	Apps	Goals	Apps	Goals	Apps	Goals	Apps	Goals
Deportivo Riestra	2014	Primera C Metropolitana	18	0	0	0	—		—		0	0	18	0
Deportivo Riestra	2015	Primera B Metropolitana	33	0	3	0	—		—		0	0	36	0
Deportivo Riestra	2016	Primera B Metropolitana	14	0	0	0	—		—		0	0	14	0
Deportivo Riestra	2016–17	Primera B Metropolitana	17	1	1	0	—		—		2 (Note: Appearance(s) in the Primera B Metropolitana play-offs)	0	20	1
Deportivo Riestra	2017–18	Primera B Nacional	11	1	1	0	—		—		0	0	12	1
Deportivo Riestra	2018–19	Primera B Metropolitana	33	3	0	0	—		—		0	0	33	3
Deportivo Riestra	Total		126	5	5	0	—		—		2	0	133	5
Almirante Brown	2019–20	Primera B Metropolitana	11	0	0	0	—		—		0	0	11	0
Career total			137	5	5	0	—		—		2	0	144	5

== Honours ==
Deportivo Riestra

- Primera D Metropolitana: 2013–14
