= Marino Arzamendia =

Paraguayan footballer (born 1998)

Personal information
- Full name: Marino Osmar Arzamendia Espinoza
- Date of birth: 19 January 1998 (age 28)
- Place of birth: San Ignacio, Paraguay
- Height: 1.93 m (6 ft 4 in)
- Position: Goalkeeper

Team information
- Current team: Deportivo Riestra (on loan from Olimpia)
- Number: 23

Youth career
- Olimpia

Senior career*
Years	Team	Apps	(Gls)
2016–	Olimpia	10	(0)
2018	→ Deportivo Santaní (loan)	1	(0)
2019	→ Sportivo Luqueño (loan)	28	(0)
2020	→ 12 de Octubre (loan)	1	(0)
2021	→ San Lorenzo (loan)	0	(0)
2023	→ Resistencia (loan)	11	(0)
2024	→ Chacarita Juniors (loan)	20	(0)
2025	→ Guaraní (loan)	0	(0)
2026–	→ Deportivo Riestra (loan)	2	(0)

International career
2015	Paraguay U17	1	(0)
2015–2017	Paraguay U20	7	(0)
- * Club domestic league appearances and goals as of 17:41, 13 November 2026 (UTC)

Marino Osmar Arzamendia Espinoza (born 19 January 1998) is a Paraguayan professional footballer who plays as a goalkeeper for Argentine Primera División club Deportivo Riestra, on loan from Paraguayan club Club Olimpia.

== Career ==
Born in Misiones Department, Arzamendia began playing football in Olimpia's youth academy.

=== International ===
He was called up to Paraguay U20 squad in 2017 South American Youth Football Championship.
