= Gonzalo Bravo =

Argentine footballer (born 1990)

Personal information
- Full name: Gonzalo Martín Bravo
- Date of birth: 18 May 1990 (age 36)
- Place of birth: Ciudadela, Argentina
- Height: 1.64 m (5 ft 5 in)
- Positions: Midfielder; forward

Team information
- Current team: Gimnasia y Tiro (on loan from Deportivo Riestra)

Senior career*
| Years | Team | Apps | (Gls) |
| 2009–2013 | Centro Español | 112 | (20) |
| 2013–2014 | Deportes Linares | 21 | (3) |
| 2014– | Deportivo Riestra | 221 | (42) |
| 2016 | → Defensa y Justicia (loan) | 1 | (0) |
| 2017 | → Fujairah (loan) | 7 | (0) |
| 2025– | → Gimnasia y Tiro (loan) | 1 | (0) |
- * Club domestic league appearances and goals as of 17:34, 8 July 2025 (UTC)

Gonzalo Martín Bravo (born 18 May 1990) is an Argentine professional footballer who plays as a midfielder or forward for Gimnasia y Tiro, on loan from Deportivo Riestra.

== Career ==
Bravo began his career with Centro Español. He scored twenty goals across one hundred and twelve fixtures in four years from 2009 in Primera D Metropolitana. On 29 August 2013, Bravo completed a move to Deportes Linares of the Chilean Segunda División. He made his bow for the club on 1 September against Malleco Unido, which preceded the player scoring for the first time in a 1–1 draw with Deportes Iberia in October. A brace over Ñublense B followed in February 2014, as he appeared in a total of twenty-one matches as they finished seventh. June 2014 saw Bravo join tier four's Deportivo Riestra.

Bravo won promotion in his first campaign with Deportivo Riestra, netting twice in eighteen as they earned a place in Primera B Metropolitana for 2015. Forty-nine games and seven goals occurred in the next two seasons. On 19 July 2016, Bravo was signed on loan by Primera División team Defensa y Justicia. His bow came on 10 September versus San Lorenzo, as he featured in what his only league appearance; though he did play in the Copa Argentina. He returned to Riestra for 2016–17 promotion, prior to leaving on loan again in 2017 - to UAE First Division League side Fujairah; managed by Diego Maradona.

Back with Deportivo Riestra, after relegation from Primera B Nacional, Bravo scored twenty goals in 2018–19 as they reached the promotion play-offs; he netted braces against Tristán Suárez (home and away), San Miguel, UAI Urquiza and All Boys alongside a hat-trick over Justo José de Urquiza on 3 December 2018.

== Career statistics ==
As of 3 June 2019.

Appearances and goals by club, season and competition
| Club | Season | League | | | Cup | | League Cup | | Continental | | Other | | Total | |
| Club | Season | Division | Apps | Goals | Apps | Goals | Apps | Goals | Apps | Goals | Apps | Goals | Apps | Goals |
|---|---|---|---|---|---|---|---|---|---|---|---|---|---|---|
| Centro Español | 2009–10 | Primera D Metropolitana | 28 | 4 | 0 | 0 | — | | — | | 0 | 0 | 28 | 4 |
| Centro Español | 2010–11 | Primera D Metropolitana | 22 | 5 | 0 | 0 | — | | — | | 0 | 0 | 22 | 5 |
| Centro Español | 2011–12 | Primera D Metropolitana | 30 | 1 | 0 | 0 | — | | — | | 0 | 0 | 30 | 1 |
| Centro Español | 2012–13 | Primera D Metropolitana | 32 | 10 | 0 | 0 | — | | — | | 0 | 0 | 32 | 10 |
| Centro Español | Total | | 112 | 20 | 0 | 0 | — | | — | | 0 | 0 | 112 | 20 |
| Deportes Linares | 2013–14 | Segunda División | 21 | 3 | 0 | 0 | — | | — | | 0 | 0 | 21 | 3 |
| Deportivo Riestra | 2014 | Primera C Metropolitana | 18 | 2 | 0 | 0 | — | | — | | 0 | 0 | 18 | 2 |
| Deportivo Riestra | 2015 | Primera B Metropolitana | 30 | 3 | 0 | 0 | — | | — | | 0 | 0 | 30 | 3 |
| Deportivo Riestra | 2016 | Primera B Metropolitana | 17 | 3 | 2 | 1 | — | | — | | 0 | 0 | 19 | 4 |
| Deportivo Riestra | 2016–17 | Primera B Metropolitana | 16 | 1 | 1 | 0 | — | | — | | 5 (Note: Appearance(s) in the Primera B Metropolitana play-offs) | 0 | 22 | 1 |
| Deportivo Riestra | 2017–18 | Primera B Nacional | 13 | 6 | 0 | 0 | — | | — | | 0 | 0 | 13 | 6 |
| Deportivo Riestra | 2018–19 | Primera B Metropolitana | 35 | 20 | 1 | 0 | — | | — | | 0 | 0 | 36 | 20 |
| Deportivo Riestra | Total | | 129 | 35 | 4 | 1 | — | | — | | 5 | 0 | 138 | 36 |
| Defensa y Justicia (loan) | 2016–17 | Primera División | 1 | 0 | 1 | 0 | — | | — | | 0 | 0 | 2 | 0 |
| Career total | | | 263 | 58 | 5 | 1 | — | | — | | 5 | 0 | 273 | 59 |
