= Fernando Magallán =

Argentine footballer

Personal information
- Full name: Fernando Gabriel Magallán
- Date of birth: 23 August 1997 (age 29)
- Place of birth: Argentina
- Position: Midfielder

Team information
- Current team: Defensores Unidos

Youth career
- Defensores Unidos

Senior career*
| Years | Team | Apps | (Gls) |
| 2017– | Defensores Unidos | 8 | (0) |
- * Club domestic league appearances and goals as of 23:43, 18 May 2019 (UTC)

Fernando Gabriel Magallán (born 23 August 1997) is an Argentine professional footballer who plays as a midfielder for Defensores Unidos.

== Career ==
Magallán came through the ranks of Defensores Unidos. After four appearances in the club's promotion-winning campaign of 2017–18 from Primera C Metropolitana, the midfielder returned to their reserves before manager Ángel Lema promoted him back into their senior set-up in March 2019. He made his Primera B Metropolitana debut during a goalless draw with Sacachispas on 2 March, prior to featuring later that month in fixtures with Almirante Brown, San Miguel and Justo José de Urquiza.

== Career statistics ==
As of 18 May 2019.

Appearances and goals by club, season and competition
| Club | Season | League | | | Cup | | League Cup | | Continental | | Other | | Total | |
| Club | Season | Division | Apps | Goals | Apps | Goals | Apps | Goals | Apps | Goals | Apps | Goals | Apps | Goals |
|---|---|---|---|---|---|---|---|---|---|---|---|---|---|---|
| Defensores Unidos | 2017–18 | Primera C Metropolitana | 4 | 0 | 0 | 0 | — | | — | | 0 | 0 | 4 | 0 |
| Defensores Unidos | 2018–19 | Primera B Metropolitana | 4 | 0 | 0 | 0 | — | | — | | 0 | 0 | 4 | 0 |
| Career total | | | 8 | 0 | 0 | 0 | — | | — | | 0 | 0 | 8 | 0 |

== Honours ==
Defensores Unidos

- Primera C Metropolitana: 2017–18
