= Ariel Morales =

Argentine footballer

Personal information
- Full name: Gustavo Ariel Morales
- Date of birth: 23 February 1997 (age 29)
- Place of birth: Corrientes, Argentina
- Height: 1.83 m (6 ft 0 in)
- Position: Defender

Team information
- Current team: Deportes Puerto Montt
- Number: 2

Youth career
- Boca Unidos

Senior career*
Years	Team	Apps	(Gls)
2017–2022	Boca Unidos	106	(4)
2021–2022	→ Guaraní Antonio Franco (loan)	7	(0)
2022	→ Guaraní Antonio Franco (loan)	10	(0)
2023–2024	Defensores Unidos	50	(0)
2025	Flandria	30	(0)
2026–	Deportes Puerto Montt	1	(0)
- * Club domestic league appearances and goals as of 23 February 2026

Gustavo Ariel Morales (born 23 February 1997), known as Ariel Morales, is an Argentine professional footballer who plays as a defender for Chilean club Deportes Puerto Montt.

== Career ==
Born in Corrientes, Argentina, Morales was trained at Boca Unidos. He joined the first team in 2017 and became the team captain. He had two different stints on loan with Guaraní Antonio Franco between 2021 and 2022.

Once his contract with Boca Unidos ended, Morales joined Defensores Unidos in January 2023 for two seasons.

During 2025, Morales played for Flandria.

In December 2025, Morales moved to Chile and signed with Deportes Puerto Montt.
