= Matías Módolo =

Argentine footballer and manager

Personal information
- Full name: Matías Fabián Módolo
- Date of birth: 9 April 1987 (age 39)
- Place of birth: Morón, Argentina
- Height: 1.78 m (5 ft 10 in)
- Position: Midfielder

Youth career
- Racing Club

Senior career*
Years	Team	Apps	(Gls)
2008	Excursionistas		
2009	Libertad Gran Mamoré		
2010–2011	Estudiantes BA		
2011–2012	Midland		
2012–2014	Deportivo Laferrere		

Managerial career
- 2015–2017: Trocha
- 2017–2021: Centro Español
- 2021–2023: Midland
- 2023–2024: Deportivo Riestra
- 2024–2025: Gimnasia Jujuy
- 2026: Chacarita Juniors
- * Club domestic league appearances and goals

Matías Fabián Módolo (born 9 April 1987) is an Argentine football manager and former player who played as a midfielder.

== Playing career ==
Born in Morón, Buenos Aires, Módolo was a Racing Club youth graduate. After finishing his formation, he moved to Excursionistas in July 2008, but left the club in December of that year after making no appearances.

In June 2010, after a spell with Bolivian side Libertad Gran Mamoré, Módolo returned to his home country after joining Estudiantes de Buenos Aires. He subsequently represented Midland and Deportivo Laferrere before retiring with the latter at the age of 27.

== Managerial career ==
After retiring, Módolo started managing a football centre named CIFA (Centro Integral del Futbolista Argentino). He then worked at a FC Barcelona academy in Luján before becoming the manager of Club Atlético Trocha in 2015.

In September 2017, Módolo was named manager of Centro Español along with Sergio Orsini. Both left in August 2021, and subsequently took over Midland.

Both Módolo and Orsini left Midland on 17 April 2023. On 29 September, Módolo was named sole manager of Primera Nacional side Deportivo Riestra.

Módolo debuted at Riestra on 2 October 2023, in a 3–0 home win over Aldosivi, and remained unbeaten for the remainder of the season, winning the Torneo Reducido and achieving promotion to the Primera División with the club after defeating Deportivo Maipú in the final. The following 7 February, however, he was sacked.
