= Lázaro Romero =

Argentine footballer

Personal information
- Full name: Lázaro Ramón Romero
- Date of birth: 13 December 1995 (age 30)
- Place of birth: San Pedro, Argentina
- Height: 1.76 m (5 ft 9 in)
- Position: Forward

Team information
- Current team: Acassuso

Youth career
- Ferrocarril Chajarí
- Huracán
- Acassuso

Senior career*
Years	Team	Apps	(Gls)
2015–2019	Acassuso	47	(5)
2019–2022	Deportivo Merlo	36	(17)
2022–2024	Deportivo Riestra	56	(26)
2024–2025	Deportes Iquique	4	(2)
2025–2026	Ferro Carril Oeste	15	(1)
2026–	Acassuso	6	(2)
- * Club domestic league appearances and goals as of 16:53, 21 April 2026 (UTC)

Lázaro Ramón Romero (born 13 December 1995) is an Argentine footballer who plays as a forward for Acassuso.

== Club career ==
Born in San Pedro, Entre Ríos, Argentina, Romero was with both Ferrocarril de Chajarí and Huracán before joining Acassuso, with whom he made his professional debut.

Later, he played for Deportivo Merlo, with whom he got promotion to the Primera B in the 2020 season, and Deportivo Riestra, with whom he got promotion to the Argentine top division in the 2023 season.

In 2024, he moved to Chile and signed with Deportes Iquique in the Chilean Primera División. He scored a goal in his debut in the 2–3 win against Audax Italiano on 19 February.
