= Ignacio Gariglio =

Argentine professional footballer

Personal information
- Date of birth: 25 April 1998 (age 28)
- Place of birth: Santa Rosa, Argentina
- Position: Centre-back

Team information
- Current team: Deportivo Riestra
- Number: 6

Youth career
- Deportivo Mac Allister
- 2017: → Estudiantes (loan)
- 2018–2020: Estudiantes

Senior career*
Years	Team	Apps	(Gls)
2020–2023	Estudiantes	0	(0)
2020–2023	→ Arsenal de Sarandí (loan)	53	(2)
2024	Delfín	14	(1)
2025	Deportivo Garcilaso	15	(4)
2025–2026	Bolívar	5	(0)
2026–	Deportivo Riestra	8	(0)
- * Club domestic league appearances and goals as of 17:35, 13 November 2026 (UTC)

Ignacio Gariglio (born 25 April 1998) is an Argentine professional footballer who plays as a centre-back for Deportivo Riestra.

== Career ==
Gariglio started with Deportivo Mac Allister before joining Estudiantes; initially on loan. He signed his first pro contract on 30 June 2019, having previously been injured for one year due to a trapped vein in his left leg. In October 2020, Gariglio was loaned to fellow Primera División club Arsenal de Sarandí. After going unused on the bench for Copa de la Liga Profesional matches with Unión Santa Fe and Atlético Tucumán (twice) in November, Gariglio made his debut on 5 December in the same competition against Racing Club; replacing Jhonatan Candia for the final seven minutes of a win.

== Career statistics ==
As of 30 November 2024.

Appearances and goals by club, season and competition
Club	Division	League			Cup		Continental		Total	
Club	Division	Season	Apps	Goals	Apps	Goals	Apps	Goals	Apps	Goals
Arsenal de Sarandí	Primera División	2020-21	3	0	1	0	0	0	4	0
Arsenal de Sarandí	Primera División	2021	10	0	0	0	2	0	12	0
Arsenal de Sarandí	Primera División	2022	20	2	0	0	0	0	20	2
Arsenal de Sarandí	Primera División	2023	13	0	1	0	0	0	14	0
Arsenal de Sarandí	Total		46	2	2	0	2	0	50	2
Delfín	Serie A	2024	14	1	0	0	6	2	20	3
Career total			60	3	2	0	8	2	70	5
