= Nicolás González (footballer, born 1994) =

Argentine footballer

Personal information
- Full name: Nicolás Adrián González Szoke
- Date of birth: 16 January 1994 (age 32)
- Place of birth: Argentina
- Position: Defender

Team information
- Current team: Berazategui

Youth career
- Banfield

Senior career*
Years	Team	Apps	(Gls)
2013–2014	Banfield	0	(0)
2014–2015	Textil Mandiyú	4	(0)
2015–2016	Villa Dálmine	0	(0)
2016–2017	Excursionistas	20	(1)
2017–2018	Cambaceres	0	(0)
2018–	Berazategui	34	(0)
- * Club domestic league appearances and goals as of 21:39, 22 May 2020 (UTC)

Nicolás Adrián González Szoke (born 16 January 1994) is an Argentine footballer who plays as a defender for Berazategui.

== Career ==
Banfield were González's first senior club. He made his Banfield debut in the Copa Argentina versus Central Norte on 13 March 2013, having been an unused substitute a year earlier for a tie against Atlético de Rafaela. He left Banfield in 2014 after failing to make a league appearance, but was once an unused substitute for a Primera B Nacional match with Almirante Brown. Upon departing Banfield, González had a spell with Torneo Federal A club Textil Mandiyú between 2014 and 2015, making his senior debut in a defeat to Sol de América. 2015 saw him join Primera B Nacional team Villa Dálmine, but he left a year later without featuring.

On 13 July 2016, González signed for Primera B Metropolitana club Excursionistas. He made his professional debut on 4 September versus Tristán Suárez and scored his first career goal in the process in a 3–0 victory. He went onto make twenty appearances for Excursionistas as they were relegated to Primera C Metropolitana. He departed soon after and joined fellow Primera C Metropolitana side Cambaceres in 2017, which preceded a move to Berazategui a year later.

== Career statistics ==
As of 6 September 2018.

Club statistics
Club	Season	League			Cup (Note: Includes the Copa Argentina)		League Cup		Continental		Other		Total	
Club	Season	Division	Apps	Goals	Apps	Goals	Apps	Goals	Apps	Goals	Apps	Goals	Apps	Goals
Banfield	2011–12	Primera División	0	0	0	0	—		—		0	0	0	0
Banfield	2012–13	Primera B Nacional	0	0	1	0	—		—		0	0	1	0
Banfield	2013–14	Primera B Nacional	0	0	0	0	—		—		0	0	0	0
Banfield	Total		0	0	1	0	—		—		0	0	1	0
Textil Mandiyú	2014	Torneo Federal A	4	0	1	0	—		—		0	0	5	0
Villa Dálmine	2015	Primera B Nacional	0	0	0	0	—		—		0	0	0	0
Villa Dálmine	2016	Primera B Nacional	0	0	0	0	—		—		0	0	0	0
Villa Dálmine	Total		0	0	0	0	—		—		0	0	0	0
Excursionistas	2016–17	Primera B Metropolitana	20	1	0	0	—		—		0	0	20	1
Cambaceres	2017–18	Primera C Metropolitana	0	0	0	0	—		—		0	0	0	0
Berazategui	2018–19	Primera C Metropolitana	1	0	0	0	—		—		0	0	1	0
Career total			25	1	2	0	—		—		0	0	27	1
