= Nicolás González (footballer, born 1992) =

Argentine footballer

Nico González
Personal information
- Full name: Nicolás Antonio González
- Date of birth: 4 February 1992 (age 34)
- Place of birth: Buenos Aires, Argentina
- Height: 1.69 m (5 ft 7 in)
- Position: Attacking midfielder

Youth career
- 2009–2011: Boca Juniors

Senior career*
Years	Team	Apps	(Gls)
2011–2014	Boca Juniors	0	(0)
2012	→ La Calera (loan)	10	(0)
2014–2015	Deportivo Morón	5	(0)
2015	Estudiantes-BA	7	(0)
2015–2017	Las Palmas B	49	(11)
2017–2021	Villa Santa Brígida	0	(0)
2021	Xelajú	6	(0)
- * Club domestic league appearances and goals as of 27 May 2017

Nicolás "Nico" Antonio González (born 4 February 1992) is an Argentine footballer who plays as an attacking midfielder.

== Honours ==
=== Club ===
Boca Juniors

- Argentine Primera División: 2011 Clausura
