= Mariano Bracamonte =

Argentine footballer (born 1999)

Personal information
- Full name: Mariano Gastón Bracamonte
- Date of birth: 24 April 1999 (age 27)
- Place of birth: Argentina
- Position: Defender

Team information
- Current team: Deportivo Riestra
- Number: 36

Senior career*
| Years | Team | Apps | (Gls) |
| 2019–2026 | Deportivo Morón | 57 | (3) |
| 2023 | → UAI Urquiza (loan) | 29 | (4) |
| 2025 | → Deportivo Riestra (loan) | 17 | (0) |
| 2026– | Deportivo Riestra | 21 | (1) |
- * Club domestic league appearances and goals as of 17:45, 13 November 2026 (UTC)

Mariano Gastón Bracamonte (born 24 April 1999) is an Argentine professional footballer who plays as a defender for Deportivo Riestra.

== Career ==
Bracamonte's career started with Deportivo Morón. He made his senior debut in the club's Primera B Nacional match with Quilmes on 24 February 2019, participating for seventy-eight minutes of a 1–0 victory.

== Career statistics ==
As of 25 February 2019.

Appearances and goals by club, season and competition
| Club | Season | League | | | Cup | | Continental | | Other | | Total | |
| Club | Season | Division | Apps | Goals | Apps | Goals | Apps | Goals | Apps | Goals | Apps | Goals |
|---|---|---|---|---|---|---|---|---|---|---|---|---|
| Deportivo Morón | 2018–19 | Primera B Nacional | 1 | 0 | 0 | 0 | — | | 0 | 0 | 1 | 0 |
| Career total | | | 1 | 0 | 0 | 0 | — | | 0 | 0 | 1 | 0 |
