= Walter Acuña =

Argentine footballer

Personal information
- Full name: Walter Rubén Acuña
- Date of birth: 4 March 1992 (age 34)
- Place of birth: San Nicolás de los Arroyos, Argentina
- Height: 1.77 m (5 ft 9 1/2 in)
- Position: Forward

Youth career
- Rosario Central

Senior career*
Years	Team	Apps	(Gls)
2012–2017	Rosario Central	33	(8)
2015–2016	→ Olimpo (loan)	26	(6)
2016	→ Colón (loan)	2	(0)
2017–2018	Juventud Unida	21	(2)
2018	Ħamrun Spartans	0	(0)
2018–2019	Villa Mitre	4	(0)
2019–2024	Deportivo Riestra	100	(21)
2023	→ Almirante Brown (loan)	14	(3)
2024	Estudiantes RC	4	(0)
2025	Ciudad Bolívar	4	(0)
2025	Cibao FC	4	(0)
- * Club domestic league appearances and goals as of 12:41, 9 January 2026 (UTC)

Walter Rubén Acuña (born 4 March 1992) is an Argentine professional footballer who plays as a forward. He is currently without a team.

== Career ==
Acuña began his career with Primera B Nacional club Rosario Central, making two appearances during the club's promotion-winning season of 2012–13. In just his second Argentine Primera División match, Acuña scored his first career goal in a defeat to Vélez Sarsfield. In total, he made twenty appearances in the Primera División and scored five times. Midway through the 2015 campaign, Acuña was loaned out to Olimpo until the end of 2016. He participated in twenty-six matches and scored six goals. In July 2016, Acuña signed for Colón on loan. However, after two games, he returned to Rosario Central and was released.

In August 2017, Acuña joined Primera B Nacional side Juventud Unida. He made his Juventud debut on 24 September versus Guillermo Brown. Acuña sealed a transfer to Malta in August 2018 by signing for Ħamrun Spartans. However, the forward departed soon after; though did appear and score in a friendly match against Żejtun Corinthians on 5 August. Acuña subsequently returned to Argentina with Torneo Federal A's Villa Mitre, whom he would later go on to appear four times for. On 12 June 2019, Deportivo Riestra of Primera B Nacional was announced as Acuña's seventh career club; effective for 3 July.

After passing through Ciudad Bolívar At the beginning of 2025 and Cibao FC in July 2025, He is currently without a team.

== Career statistics ==
As of 12 June 2019.

Club statistics
Club	Season	League			Cup		League Cup		Continental		Other		Total	
Club	Season	Division	Apps	Goals	Apps	Goals	Apps	Goals	Apps	Goals	Apps	Goals	Apps	Goals
Rosario Central	2012–13	Primera B Nacional	2	0	0	0	—		—		0	0	2	0
Rosario Central	2013–14	Primera División	20	5	0	0	—		—		0	0	20	5
Rosario Central	2014	Primera División	10	3	3	0	—		2 (Note: Appearance(s) in Copa Sudamericana)	0	0	0	15	3
Rosario Central	2015	Primera División	1	0	0	0	—		—		0	0	1	0
Rosario Central	2016	Primera División	0	0	0	0	—		0	0	0	0	0	0
Rosario Central	2016–17	Primera División	0	0	0	0	—		—		0	0	0	0
Rosario Central	Total		33	8	3	0	—		2	0	0	0	38	8
Olimpo (loan)	2015	Primera División	15	4	0	0	—		—		0	0	15	4
Olimpo (loan)	2016	Primera División	11	2	0	0	—		—		0	0	11	2
Olimpo (loan)	Total		26	6	0	0	—		—		0	0	26	6
Colón (loan)	2016–17	Primera División	2	0	0	0	—		—		0	0	2	0
Juventud Unida	2017–18	Primera B Nacional	21	2	0	0	—		—		0	0	21	2
Ħamrun Spartans	2018–19	Premier League	0	0	0	0	—		—		0	0	0	0
Villa Mitre	2018–19	Torneo Federal A	4	0	0	0	—		—		0	0	4	0
Career total			86	16	3	0	—		2	0	0	0	91	16

== Honours ==
Rosario Central

- Primera B Nacional: 2012–13
