= Ignacio Arce =

Argentine footballer

Personal information
- Full name: Ignacio Mauricio Jesús Arce
- Date of birth: 8 April 1992 (age 34)
- Place of birth: Paraná, Argentina
- Height: 1.85 m (6 ft 1 in)
- Position: Goalkeeper

Team information
- Current team: Deportivo Riestra
- Number: 1

Youth career
- Unión Santa Fe

Senior career*
Years	Team	Apps	(Gls)
2010–2022	Unión Santa Fe	4	(0)
2012–2013	→ Deportivo Merlo (loan)	4	(0)
2014–2015	→ Atlético Paraná (loan)	52	(0)
2016–2017	→ Crucero del Norte (loan)	49	(0)
2017–2019	→ San Martín (loan)	31	(0)
2019	→ Instituto (loan)	11	(0)
2019–2021	→ San Martín T. (loan)	62	(1)
2022–2023	Unión La Calera	29	(0)
2023	Platense	5	(0)
2023–	Deportivo Riestra	125	(0)

International career
2009	Argentina U17	1	(0)
- * Club domestic league appearances and goals as of 17:34, 13 November 2026 (UTC)

Ignacio Mauricio Jesús Arce (born 8 April 1992) is an Argentine professional footballer who plays as a goalkeeper for Deportivo Riestra.

== Club career ==
Arce started in Primera B Nacional with Unión Santa Fe. His debut arrived on 24 September 2010 during a 0–2 loss to Patronato, in a season where he was an unused substitute twenty-three times. On 11 July 2012, Deportivo Merlo loaned Arce. He featured in four games in 2012–13. 2014 saw Arce join Atlético Paraná of Torneo Federal A. They were promoted in his opening year, in which he featured nineteen times. He remained for the 2015 Primera B Nacional campaign. For the next two seasons, Arce spent time with fellow second tier side Crucero del Norte. Forty-nine appearances followed.

He was loaned out for a fourth time on 31 July 2017, joining San Martín. His first appearance came on 16 September in Primera B Nacional versus Ferro Carril Oeste. 2017–18 ended with promotion to the Primera División. He participated in nine matches in the first half of 2018–19, though Arce returned to Unión Santa Fe in January 2019 and subsequently left on loan once more to Instituto. In July 2019, Arce again left Unión on loan as he agreed terms on a return to San Martín. He scored the first goal of his senior career on 24 November, netting a stoppage time equaliser against ex-club Instituto at home.

On 14 January 2022, Arce joined Chilean Primera División club Unión La Calera on a deal until the end of 2023.

== International career ==
Arce was selected by the Argentina U17s for the 2009 FIFA U-17 World Cup in Nigeria. He appeared in one fixture, a final matchday group defeat to the hosts on 30 October. He also went to the 2009 South American Under-17 Football Championship but didn't play. In November 2010, he trained with the U20s ahead of the 2011 South American U-20 Championship in Peru though wasn't picked in the tournament squad.

== Career statistics ==
As of 3 September 2020.

Club statistics
Club	Season	League			Cup		League Cup		Continental		Other		Total	
Club	Season	Division	Apps	Goals	Apps	Goals	Apps	Goals	Apps	Goals	Apps	Goals	Apps	Goals
Unión Santa Fe	2010–11	Primera B Nacional	1	0	0	0	—		—		0	0	1	0
Unión Santa Fe	2011–12	Primera División	0	0	0	0	—		—		0	0	0	0
Unión Santa Fe	2012–13	Primera División	0	0	0	0	—		—		0	0	0	0
Unión Santa Fe	2013–14	Primera B Nacional	3	0	1	0	—		—		0	0	4	0
Unión Santa Fe	2014	Primera B Nacional	0	0	0	0	—		—		0	0	0	0
Unión Santa Fe	2015	Primera División	0	0	0	0	—		—		0	0	0	0
Unión Santa Fe	2016	Primera División	0	0	0	0	—		—		0	0	0	0
Unión Santa Fe	2016–17	Primera División	0	0	0	0	—		—		0	0	0	0
Unión Santa Fe	2017–18	Primera División	0	0	0	0	—		—		0	0	0	0
Unión Santa Fe	2018–19	Primera División	0	0	0	0	0	0	0	0	0	0	0	0
Unión Santa Fe	2019–20	Primera División	0	0	0	0	0	0	0	0	0	0	0	0
Unión Santa Fe	Total		4	0	1	0	0	0	0	0	0	0	5	0
Deportivo Merlo (loan)	2012–13	Primera B Nacional	4	0	0	0	—		—		0	0	4	0
Atlético Paraná (loan)	2014	Torneo Federal A	13	0	0	0	—		—		6 (Note: Appearance(s) in the Torneo Federal A play-offs)	0	19	0
Atlético Paraná (loan)	2015	Primera B Nacional	39	0	0	0	—		—		0	0	39	0
Atlético Paraná (loan)	Total		52	0	0	0	0	0	—		6	0	58	0
Crucero del Norte (loan)	2016	Primera B Nacional	7	0	1	0	—		—		0	0	8	0
Crucero del Norte (loan)	2016–17	Primera B Nacional	42	0	0	0	—		—		0	0	42	0
Crucero del Norte (loan)	Total		49	0	0	0	—		—		0	0	49	0
San Martín (loan)	2017–18	Primera B Nacional	24	0	0	0	—		—		5 (Note: Appearance(s) in the Primera B Nacional play-offs)	0	29	0
San Martín (loan)	2018–19	Primera División	7	0	2	0	0	0	—		0	0	9	0
San Martín (loan)	Total		31	0	2	0	0	0	—		5	0	38	0
Instituto (loan)	2018–19	Primera B Nacional	11	0	0	0	—		—		0	0	11	0
San Martín (loan)	2019–20	Primera B Nacional	21	1	1	0	—		—		0	0	22	1
Career total			172	1	5	0	0	0	0	0	11	0	188	1
