= Pedro Ramírez (footballer, born 2000) =

Argentine footballer (born 2000)

Personal information
- Full name: Pedro David Ramírez
- Date of birth: 4 April 2000 (age 26)
- Place of birth: Florencio Varela, Argentina
- Height: 1.75 m (5 ft 9 in)
- Position: Right-back

Team information
- Current team: Deportivo Riestra
- Number: 5

Youth career
- Deportivo Chacabuco
- River Plate
- Lanús
- 2016–2020: Defensa y Justicia

Senior career*
| Years | Team | Apps | (Gls) |
| 2020–2026 | Defensa y Justicia | 5 | (0) |
| 2021 | → Estudiantes BA (loan) | 13 | (0) |
| 2022–2025 | → Deportivo Riestra (loan) | 95 | (3) |
| 2026– | Deportivo Riestra | 23 | (1) |
- * Club domestic league appearances and goals as of 17:35, 13 November 2026 (UTC)

Pedro David Ramírez (born 4 April 2000) is an Argentine professional footballer who plays as a right-back for Deportivo Riestra.

== Career ==
Ramírez started out at Deportivo Chacabuco from the age of five, before joining River Plate at the age of seven. Aged twelve, Ramírez headed to Lanús before signing for Defensa y Justicia in 2016; as a midfielder. With the latter, he made the breakthrough into first-team football under Hernán Crespo in 2020; as a right-back. After appearing on the substitute's bench for a Copa de la Liga Profesional match with Colón and Copa Sudamericana ties with Sportivo Luqueño and Vasco da Gama, Ramírez made his senior debut domestically on 29 November 2020 against Central Córdoba; as a starter. In the 2021 season, Ramírez played on loan for Estudiantes de Buenos Aires. In June 2022, he was loaned out to Deportivo Riestra.

== Career statistics ==
As of 4 December 2020.

Appearances and goals by club, season and competition
| Club | Season | League | | | Cup | | League Cup | | Continental | | Other | | Total | |
| Club | Season | Division | Apps | Goals | Apps | Goals | Apps | Goals | Apps | Goals | Apps | Goals | Apps | Goals |
|---|---|---|---|---|---|---|---|---|---|---|---|---|---|---|
| Defensa y Justicia | 2020–21 (Note: Soccerway counts Copa de la Liga Profesional appearances as league appearances.) | Primera División | 1 | 0 | 0 | 0 | 0 | 0 | 1 (Note: Appearance(s) in the Copa Sudamericana) | 0 | 0 | 0 | 2 | 0 |
| Career total | | | 1 | 0 | 0 | 0 | 0 | 0 | 1 | 0 | 0 | 0 | 2 | 0 |
