= Nicolás González (footballer, born 1996) =

Spanish footballer

Personal information
- Full name: Nicolás González Fernández
- Date of birth: 18 January 1996 (age 30)
- Place of birth: Cantabria, Spain
- Height: 1.70 m (5 ft 7 in)
- Position: Midfielder

Youth career
- CA Perines

Senior career*
Years	Team	Apps	(Gls)
2015–2017	Guarnizo	22	(16)
2017–2018	Murciélagos	8	(0)
2018–2019	Portugalete	18	(2)
2019–2020	Bezana	25	(5)
2020–2021	UM Escobedo	23	(3)
- * Club domestic league appearances and goals as of 16:56, 28 February 2023 (UTC)

Nicolás González Fernández (born 18 January 1996) is a Spanish footballer who plays as a midfielder.
