= Jonatan Goitía =

Argentine footballer

Personal information
- Full name: Jonatan Esteban Goitía
- Date of birth: 2 August 1994 (age 32)
- Place of birth: Mariano Moreno, Argentina (Note: Sources differ. Those giving Mariano Moreno include: BDFA (partial) and Soccerway. Those giving Moreno, Buenos Aires: BDFA (partial) and Diario El Zonda)
- Height: 1.75 m (5 ft 9 in)
- Position: Defender

Team information
- Current team: Deportivo Riestra
- Number: 27

Youth career
- Deportivo Riestra
- Banfield

Senior career*
Years	Team	Apps	(Gls)
2010	Deportivo Riestra	1	(0)
2015	Atlas	30	(1)
2016–2017	Sportivo Barracas	28	(2)
2017–2019	San Martín SJ	12	(0)
2019–	Deportivo Riestra	227	(15)
- * Club domestic league appearances and goals as of 17:45, 13 November 2026 (UTC)

Jonatan Esteban Goitía (born 2 August 1994) is an Argentine professional footballer who plays as a defender for Deportivo Riestra.

== Career ==
Goitía had youth stints with Deportivo Riestra and Banfield, he had appeared at senior level for the former in Primera D Metropolitana. In 2015, Goitía moved to Atlas, when he scored once in thirty fixtures as they finished second in Primera D Metropolitana. Atlas finished below eventual champions Sportivo Barracas, who signed Goitía ahead of the 2016 Primera C Metropolitana campaign. Twenty-eight appearances and two goals followed across two seasons. On 6 August 2017, Goitía joined San Martín of the Primera División. He subsequently made his professional debut, featuring in a home draw with Tigre on 5 February 2018.

Deportivo Riestra of Primera B Metropolitana resigned Goitía in January 2019.

== Career statistics ==
As of 25 January 2019.

Club statistics
Club	Season	League			Cup		Continental		Other		Total	
Club	Season	Division	Apps	Goals	Apps	Goals	Apps	Goals	Apps	Goals	Apps	Goals
Deportivo Riestra	2009–10	Primera D Metropolitana	1	0	0	0	—		0	0	1	0
Atlas	2015	Primera D Metropolitana	30	1	1	0	—		0	0	31	1
Sportivo Barracas	2016	Primera C Metropolitana	13	0	1	0	—		0	0	14	0
Sportivo Barracas	2016–17	Primera C Metropolitana	15	2	1	0	—		0	0	16	2
Sportivo Barracas	Total		28	2	2	0	—		0	0	30	2
San Martín	2017–18	Primera División	6	0	0	0	—		0	0	6	0
San Martín	2018–19	Primera División	6	0	0	0	—		0	0	6	0
San Martín	Total		12	0	0	0	—		0	0	12	0
Deportivo Riestra	2018–19	Primera B Metropolitana	0	0	0	0	—		0	0	0	0
Career total			71	3	3	0	—		0	0	74	3
