= Nicolás González (footballer, born 1999) =

Argentine professional footballer

Personal information
- Full name: José Nicolás González
- Date of birth: 24 February 1999 (age 27)
- Place of birth: Embarcación, Argentina
- Height: 1.70 m (5 ft 7 in)
- Position: Winger

Team information
- Current team: Defensores Unidos

Youth career
- River Plate (E)
- Mitre (S)
- 2015–2017: Racing Club
- 2017–2020: Defensa y Justicia

Senior career*
Years	Team	Apps	(Gls)
2020–2023	Defensa y Justicia	7	(0)
2022	→ Villa Dálmine (loan)	28	(1)
2023	→ Estudiantes de Buenos Aires (loan)	12	(1)
2024–	Defensores Unidos	11	(0)
- * Club domestic league appearances and goals as of 14 July 2024

José Nicolás González (born 24 February 1999) is an Argentine professional footballer who plays as a winger for Defensores Unidos.

== Career ==
González started with River Plate de Embarcación at the age of eight, before departing at the age of fourteen to Mitre de Salta. He was part of the latter's squad that prepared for the 2015 Torneo Federal B campaign, though he left during pre-season in order to trial at Racing Club; after receiving a travel ticket from his parents for his birthday, which allowed him to make use of a contact his aunt had with the Avellaneda club. He remained for more than a year, prior to joining Defensa y Justicia in 2017. Having scored in a Huracán friendly in 2019, González was promoted into the first-team in late-2020 under Hernán Crespo.

After appearing as an unused substitute three times, González's senior debut arrived on 29 November 2020 as he replaced Juan Cruz Villagra after sixty-one minutes of a Copa de la Liga Profesional 3–2 loss at home to Central Córdoba; he assisted Defensa's second goal.

== Career statistics ==
As of 4 December 2020.

Appearances and goals by club, season and competition
Club	Season	League			Cup		League Cup		Continental		Other		Total	
Club	Season	Division	Apps	Goals	Apps	Goals	Apps	Goals	Apps	Goals	Apps	Goals	Apps	Goals
Defensa y Justicia	2020–21 (Note: Soccerway counts Copa de la Liga Profesional appearances as league appearances.)	Primera División	1	0	0	0	0	0	0	0	0	0	1	0
Career total			1	0	0	0	0	0	0	0	0	0	1	0
