= Exequiel Beltramone =

Argentine professional footballer

Personal information
- Full name: Exequiel Dario Beltramone
- Date of birth: 9 February 1999 (age 27)
- Place of birth: Frontera, Argentina
- Height: 1.60 m (5 ft 3 in)
- Position: Winger

Team information
- Current team: Nueva Chicago
- Number: 19

Youth career
- 2012–2019: Talleres

Senior career*
Years	Team	Apps	(Gls)
2019–2024	Talleres	0	(0)
2019	→ Mitre (loan)	1	(0)
2020	→ Racing de Córdoba (loan)	3	(0)
2020	→ Sportivo Las Parejas (loan)	4	(0)
2021	→ Flat Earth (loan)	0	(0)
2021–2022	→ Tlaxcala (loan)	19	(2)
2022–2023	→ Gimnasia Jujuy (loan)	17	(0)
2023–2024	→ Chacarita Juniors (loan)	36	(2)
2025–	Nueva Chicago	4	(0)
- * Club domestic league appearances and goals as of 16:26, 20 June 2025 (UTC)

Exequiel Dario Beltramone (born 9 February 1999) is an Argentine professional footballer who plays as a winger for Nueva Chicago. (Note: Exequiel Beltramone at Soccerway)

== Club career ==
Beltramone is a product of Talleres' academy. In July 2019, Beltramone was loaned out to Primera B Nacional with Mitre. He made his senior debut on 13 October against Deportivo Morón, replacing Diego Auzqui in a 1–1 draw. That was his only appearance for them. In February 2020, Beltramone left on loan to Racing de Córdoba of Torneo Regional Federal Amateur. He appeared three times before the COVID-enforced break. On 30 October, back with Talleres, Beltramone made the first-team squad for a Copa de la Liga Profesional win over Newell's Old Boys; he went unused on the bench.

To end 2020, Beltramone had a one-month loan stint in Torneo Federal A with Sportivo Las Parejas. He featured four times, thrice as a starter, for them. On 5 February 2021, Beltramone was loaned to Spain's Tercera División with Flat Earth; penning terms until July, with the club not paying a fee or agreeing a purchase option.

== International career ==
Beltramone previously received training call-ups to Argentina's U19s and U20s.

== Career statistics ==
As of 6 February 2021.

Appearances and goals by club, season and competition
Club	Season	League			Cup		League Cup		Continental		Other		Total	
Club	Season	Division	Apps	Goals	Apps	Goals	Apps	Goals	Apps	Goals	Apps	Goals	Apps	Goals
Talleres	2019–20	Primera División	0	0	0	0	0	0	—		0	0	0	0
Talleres	2020–21	Primera División	0	0	0	0	0	0	—		0	0	0	0
Talleres	Total		0	0	0	0	0	0	—		0	0	0	0
Mitre (loan)	2019–20	Primera B Nacional	1	0	0	0	—		—		0	0	1	0
Racing de Córdoba (loan)	2020	Federal Amateur	3	0	0	0	—		—		0	0	3	0
Sportivo Las Parejas (loan)	2020	Torneo Federal A	4	0	0	0	—		—		0	0	4	0
Flat Earth (loan)	2020–21	Tercera División	0	0	0	0	0	0	—		0	0	0	0
Career total			8	0	0	0	0	0	—		0	0	8	0
