= Cristian Paz =

Argentine footballer

Personal information
- Full name: Cristian Ignacio Paz
- Date of birth: 24 April 1995 (age 31)
- Place of birth: Lomas de Zamora, Argentina
- Height: 1.86 m (6 ft 1 in)
- Position: Centre-back

Team information
- Current team: Deportivo Riestra
- Number: 22

Youth career
- –2014: Temperley

Senior career*
Years	Team	Apps	(Gls)
2014–2019	Temperley	24	(0)
2017	→ Karpaty Lviv (loan)	0	(0)
2017–2018	→ San Miguel (loan)	34	(2)
2019–2021	San Martín SJ	4	(1)
2021–2023	Deportivo Morón	62	(3)
2023–2024	Voluntari	28	(0)
2024–	Deportivo Riestra	76	(1)
- * Club domestic league appearances and goals as of 17:41, 13 November 2026 (UTC)

Cristian Ignacio Paz (born 24 April 1995) is an Argentine footballer who plays as a centre-back for Primera División club Deportivo Riestra.
