= Gustavo Fernández (Argentine footballer) =

Argentine footballer

Personal information
- Full name: Gustavo Martín Fernández
- Date of birth: 4 August 1990 (age 36)
- Place of birth: Entre Rios, Argentina
- Height: 1.71 m (5 ft 7 in)
- Position: Forward

Team information
- Current team: Mitre

Youth career
- River Plate

Senior career*
Years	Team	Apps	(Gls)
2009–2013	River Plate	3	(0)
2010–2012	→ Instituto (loan)	13	(0)
2012	→ Deportivo Saprissa (loan)	7	(1)
2012–2013	→ Deportivo Laferrere (loan)		
2013–2018	Deportivo Laferrere		
2018–2019	Defensores de Belgrano	21	(4)
2019	Magallanes	11	(3)
2020	Blooming	16	(1)
2021	Deportivo Laferrere		
2022–2026	Deportivo Riestra	89	(11)
2025	→ Gimnasia Jujuy (loan)	20	(4)
2026–	Mitre	10	(2)

International career
2007	Argentina U-17	3	(0)
- * Club domestic league appearances and goals as of 17:28, 2 May 2026 (UTC)

Gustavo Martín Fernández (born August 4, 1990, in Entre Rios) is an Argentinian football forward for Mitre.
