= Yeison Murillo =

Colombian footballer (born 1993)

Personal information
- Full name: Yeison Murillo Mena
- Date of birth: 15 November 1993 (age 32)
- Place of birth: Quibdó, Colombia
- Height: 1.75 m (5 ft 9 in)
- Position: Defender

Team information
- Current team: Deportivo Riestra
- Number: 4

Senior career*
Years	Team	Apps	(Gls)
2015–2017	Estudiantes	35	(0)
2017–	Deportivo Riestra	146	(0)
- * Club domestic league appearances and goals as of 17:40, 16 December 2025 (UTC)

Yeison Murillo Mena (born 15 November 1993) is a Colombian professional footballer who plays as a defender for Deportivo Riestra.

== Career ==
Murillo played for Estudiantes between 2015 and 2017, making his debut for them on 19 July 2015 during a Primera B Nacional home defeat to Patronato. In total, Murillo made thirty-seven appearances in three seasons with the club. On 18 August 2017, Murillo moved across the second tier to Deportivo Riestra. He participated in fourteen fixtures in the 2017–18 Primera B Nacional as they suffered relegation to Primera B Metropolitana; a division that saw him appear in thirty-two of their thirty-eight 2018–19 league fixtures.

== Career statistics ==
As of 30 May 2019.

Appearances and goals by club, season and competition
Club	Season	League			Cup		League Cup		Continental		Other		Total	
Club	Season	Division	Apps	Goals	Apps	Goals	Apps	Goals	Apps	Goals	Apps	Goals	Apps	Goals
Estudiantes	2015	Primera B Nacional	7	0	0	0	—		—		0	0	7	0
Estudiantes	2016	Primera B Nacional	7	0	1	0	—		—		0	0	8	0
Estudiantes	2016–17	Primera B Nacional	21	0	1	0	—		—		0	0	22	0
Estudiantes	Total		35	0	2	0	—		—		0	0	37	0
Deportivo Riestra	2017–18	Primera B Nacional	14	0	0	0	—		—		0	0	14	0
Deportivo Riestra	2018–19	Primera B Metropolitana	32	0	1	0	—		—		0	0	33	0
Deportivo Riestra	Total		46	0	1	0	—		—		0	0	47	0
Career total			81	0	3	0	—		—		0	0	84	0
