= Nicolás González (footballer, born 1995) =

Uruguayan footballer

Personal information
- Full name: Fernando Nicolás González Ureta
- Date of birth: 4 July 1995 (age 31)
- Place of birth: Montevideo, Uruguay
- Position: Midfielder

Senior career*
Years	Team	Apps	(Gls)
2014–2016	Rocha	22	(2)
- * Club domestic league appearances and goals

Fernando Nicolás González Ureta (born 4 July 1995) is a Uruguayan footballer who plays as a forward. He is currently a free agent.

== Career ==
González's first club was Uruguayan Segunda División side Rocha. He made his professional debut on 14 September 2014 in the league against Deportivo Maldonado, prior to scoring his first goal in his fifth game for the club in October versus Miramar Misiones. Overall, he scored two goals in twenty matches in 2014–15 as Rocha finished 14th. Rocha were relegated in 2015–16, a season which González featured just twice, to the 2017 Segunda División B.

== Career statistics ==
As of 3 May 2018.

Club statistics
Club	Season	League			Cup		League Cup		Continental		Other		Total	
Club	Season	Division	Apps	Goals	Apps	Goals	Apps	Goals	Apps	Goals	Apps	Goals	Apps	Goals
Rocha	2014–15	Segunda División	20	2	—		—		—		0	0	20	2
Rocha	2015–16	Segunda División	2	0	—		—		—		0	0	2	0
Career total			22	2	—		—		—		0	0	22	2
