= 2016 Primera C Metropolitana =

Primera C
- Champions: Excursionistas
- Relegated: Liniers
- All statistics correct as of 2016.

The 2016 Argentine Primera C was the 116th season of the third tier of football in Argentina. The season began on January and ended on July.

== League table ==
Pos	Team	Pld	W	D	L	GF	GA	GD	Pts	Promotion or Qualification
1	Excursionistas	19	12	5	2	36	24	+12	41	Promotion to Primera B
2	Sportivo Italiano	19	12	3	4	24	18	+6	39	
3	J. J. de Urquiza	19	11	4	4	28	19	+9	37	
4	Berazategui	19	10	6	3	29	16	+13	36	
5	San Martín (B)	19	9	8	2	30	18	+12	35	
6	Laferrere	19	10	3	6	28	20	+8	33	
7	Sacachispas	19	9	6	4	27	20	+7	33	
8	Argentino (Q)	19	7	7	5	22	18	+4	28	
9	Deportivo Merlo	19	6	7	6	17	15	+2	25	
10	Luján	19	6	7	6	20	21	−1	25	
11	Sportivo Barracas	19	6	6	7	22	24	−2	24	
12	Defensores de Cambaceres	19	5	7	7	20	27	−7	22	
13	Cañuelas	19	4	7	8	24	29	−5	19	
14	Dock Sud	19	4	7	8	17	22	−5	19	
15	Defensores Unidos	19	5	4	10	25	34	−9	19	
16	San Miguel	19	5	3	11	17	27	−10	18	
17	Ferrocarril Midland	19	5	2	12	17	23	−6	17	
18	Central Córdoba (R)	19	3	7	9	21	27	−6	16	
19	Liniers	19	4	4	11	17	28	−11	16	
20	Argentino (M)	19	2	7	10	16	27	−11	13	

Updated to match(es) played on 23 February 2016. Source: AFA
Rules for classification: 1) points; 2) play-off (only for deciding promotion or relegation); 3) goal difference; 4) goals scored; 5) head-to-head points; 6) head-to-head goal difference; 7) head-to-head goals scored.

== See also ==
- 2016 Argentine Primera División
- 2016 Primera B Nacional
- 2016 Torneo Federal A
- 2015–16 Copa Argentina
