= Ezequiel Almirón =

Argentine footballer

Personal information
- Full name: Ezequiel Martín Almirón
- Date of birth: 23 June 2002 (age 24)
- Place of birth: Temperley, Buenos Aires, Argentina
- Position: Forward

Team information
- Current team: Estudiantes

Youth career
- –2021: Boca Juniors

Senior career*
Years	Team	Apps	(Gls)
2021–2023	Boca Juniors	1	(0)
2023–2025	Deportivo Maipú	31	(5)
2025–2026	Tristán Suárez	25	(4)
2026–	Estudiantes BA	1	(0)
- * Club domestic league appearances and goals as of 16:11, 28 April 2026 (UTC)

Ezequiel Martín Almirón (born 20 August 2002) is an Argentine footballer currently playing as a forward for Estudiantes BA.

== Career statistics ==
=== Club ===
As of 18 August 2021.

Club	Season	League			Cup		Continental		Other		Total	
Club	Season	Division	Apps	Goals	Apps	Goals	Apps	Goals	Apps	Goals	Apps	Goals
Boca Juniors	2021	Argentine Primera División	1	0	0	0	0	0	0	0	1	0
Career total			1	0	0	0	0	0	0	0	1	0
