= Milton Céliz =

Argentine professional footballer

Personal information
- Full name: Milton Aaron Céliz
- Date of birth: 25 July 1992 (age 34)
- Place of birth: Gregorio de Laferrère, Argentina
- Height: 1.81 m (5 ft 11 in)
- Position: Forward

Team information
- Current team: Deportivo Riestra
- Number: 8

Youth career
- Arsenal de Sarandí

Senior career*
Years	Team	Apps	(Gls)
2012–2016	Arsenal de Sarandí	28	(1)
2014	→ Gimnasia Jujuy (loan)	21	(2)
2015	→ Gimnasia Jujuy (loan)	35	(8)
2016–2017	Gimnasia Jujuy	35	(4)
2017	Juan Aurich	9	(1)
2018	Independiente Rivadavia	9	(1)
2018–2021	All Boys	60	(11)
2019	→ San Luis (loan)	10	(2)
2021–2022	Tigre	38	(8)
2022	San Martín Tucumán	12	(0)
2022–2023	Almirante Brown	16	(2)
2022	→ Deportivo Riestra (loan)	1	(0)
2023–	Deportivo Riestra	112	(17)
2026	→ Barcelona SC (loan)	15	(1)
- * Club domestic league appearances and goals as of 17:37, 13 November 2026 (UTC)

Milton Aaron Céliz (born 25 July 1992) is an Argentine professional footballer who plays as a forward for Deportivo Riestra.

== Career ==
Céliz began his career with Arsenal de Sarandí. He appeared for his debut in September 2012 against River Plate, as the club conceded four unanswered goals away from home in the Argentine Primera División. He made fifteen appearances in the 2012–13 season, as well as netting his first goal on 11 March 2013 versus Lanús. Céliz didn't feature in the first part of 2013–14, subsequently leaving on loan to Gimnasia y Esgrima in 2014. Two goals in twenty-one followed in Primera B Nacional. A return to Arsenal followed for the upcoming 2014 campaign, as he played twelve times under Martín Palermo.

Gimnasia y Esgrima resigned him in 2015. He scored eight times back on loan with them. Céliz went back to Arsenal for seven months prior to rejoining Gimnasia y Esgrima for a third time - this time on a permanent contract. His third stint lasted the 2016–17 Primera B Nacional, as he took his total tally for the club to ninety-two matches and fourteen goals. Peruvian Primera División side Juan Aurich signed Céliz in August 2017. He netted on his debut versus Cantolao, on the way to relegation to tier two. Céliz went back to Argentina in the succeeding January, agreeing a deal with Independiente Rivadavia.

On 24 July 2018, Céliz joined Primera B Metropolitana's All Boys. His bow came in a 1–2 win away to Fénix.

Following spell at Tigre and San Martín de Tucumán, Céliz moved to Primera Nacional club Almirante Brown in May 2022.

== Career statistics ==
As of 18 April 2019.

Appearances and goals by club, season and competition
Club	Season	League			Cup		Continental		Other		Total	
Club	Season	Division	Apps	Goals	Apps	Goals	Apps	Goals	Apps	Goals	Apps	Goals
Arsenal de Sarandí	2012–13	Argentine Primera División	15	1	2	1	2 (Note: Appearance(s) in the Copa Libertadores)	0	0	0	19	2
Arsenal de Sarandí	2013–14	Argentine Primera División	0	0	0	0	0	0	0	0	0	0
Arsenal de Sarandí	2014	Argentine Primera División	12	0	1	0	—		0	0	13	0
Arsenal de Sarandí	2015	Argentine Primera División	0	0	0	0	0	0	0	0	0	0
Arsenal de Sarandí	2016	Argentine Primera División	1	0	0	0	—		0	0	1	0
Arsenal de Sarandí	Total		28	1	3	1	2	0	0	0	33	2
Gimnasia y Esgrima (loan)	2013–14	Primera B Nacional	21	2	0	0	—		0	0	21	2
Gimnasia y Esgrima (loan)	2015	Primera B Nacional	35	8	1	0	—		0	0	36	8
Gimnasia y Esgrima	2016–17	Primera B Nacional	35	4	0	0	—		0	0	35	4
Gimnasia y Esgrima	Total		91	14	1	0	—		0	0	92	14
Juan Aurich	2017	Peruvian Primera División	9	1	0	0	0	0	0	0	9	1
Independiente Rivadavia	2017–18	Primera B Nacional	9	1	0	0	—		0	0	9	1
All Boys	2018–19	Primera B Metropolitana	23	4	1	2	—		0	0	24	6
Career total			160	21	5	3	2	0	0	0	167	24

== Honours ==
Arsenal de Sarandí

- Supercopa Argentina: 2012
