= Estadio Guillermo Laza =

Football stadium in Buenos Aires, Argentina

Guillermo Laza Stadium
- Estadio Guillermo Laza
- Interactive map of Guillermo Laza Stadium
- Full name: Estadio Polideportivo Guillermo Laza
- Address: Ana María Janer 2651; Buenos Aires; Argentina
- Coordinates: 34°39′12″S 58°26′37″W
- Owner: Deportivo Riestra
- Capacity: 3,000
- Surface: Grass

Construction
- Opened: 20 February 1993; 33 years ago

Tenant
- Deportivo Riestra

Guillermo Laza Stadium is an association football stadium located in the Villa Soldati neighbourhood in Buenos Aires. It has a capacity of 3,000 in its three stands, one of which is for seating. Its facilities include press cabins, training field and indoor stadium.

The stadium is owned and operated by Deportivo Riestra, which inaugurated the venue in 1993.

== History ==
Riestra first used a field in the Nueva Pompeya neighbourhood, until they built their first stadium in Lacarra Avenue of Villa Soldati in 1950. The Blanquinegro squad owned this field until 1981, when Riestra suffered its expropriation by the Argentine military dictatorship to build a highway. Afterwards, Riestra remained without a home field for more than 12 years, sending home matches to nearby stadiums such as Barracas Central and Sacachispas fields.

The Blanquinegro club acquired a 2.5 hectares field to build a sports complex in 1979. After losing their stadium, plans were changed to build a new stadium in the place. On 20 February 1993 the Guillermo Laza stadium was opened, named to honour a former vice-president of the club. Riestra defeated Atlas 1–0 that day, their first match in the new stadium.

In 2009 Riestra made the last payment of their mortgage, an important upside for the club's financial position. Between 2012 and 2013 the club made several improvements to their property, including training facilities to host youth teams fixtures, as well as a new full-seater stand with a capacity of 500. In 2015 the Héctor Salorio indoor stadium was inaugurated, used by the futsal teams with a capacity of 200.

== Tenants ==
Apart from Deportivo Riestra, the stadium has been also used by other clubs such as Yupanqui, Fénix, and Deportivo Paraguayo.
