= Deportivo Riestra =

Association football club in Argentina

- Full name: Deportivo Riestra Asociación de Fomento Barrio Colón
- Nicknames: Blanquinegro (White and black); Los Malevos de Pompeya (The Malevos of Pompeya)
- Founded: 22 February 1931; 95 years ago
- Ground: Estadio Guillermo Laza
- Capacity: 3,000
- President: Fernando Salorio
- Manager: Guillermo Duró
- League: Primera División
- 2025: 6th of 30
Home colours	Away colours	Third colours

Deportivo Riestra Asociación de Fomento Barrio Colón, also known as Deportivo Riestra, is an Argentine sports club from Buenos Aires. The club is mainly focused on football. As of 2026, Deportivo Riestra plays in the Primera División, the top tier of the Argentine league system. Aside from the futsal team that plays in Primera D —the fourth tier division— Deportivo Riestra also has youth academy and women's teams competing in different tournaments and divisions.

The club headquarters are located in the Nueva Pompeya neighbourhood, with Guillermo Laza Stadium of Villa Soldati as venue for football matches. The stadium has a capacity of 3,000.

Apart from football, Riestra is affiliated to the "Federación Metropolitana de Ajedrez" (Metropolitan Chess Federation).

== History ==
=== Initial years ===
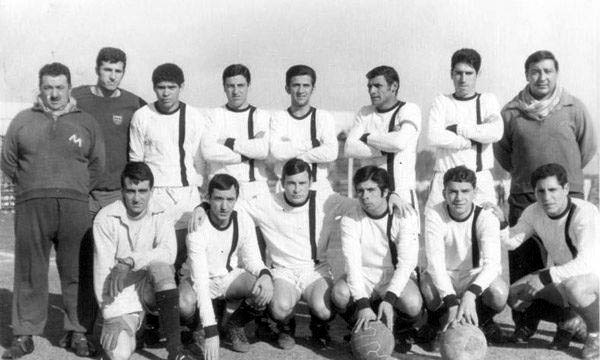
A Deportivo Riestra team of 1931, the year the club was established

The origins of Deportivo Riestra trace back to 1929, when a group of youths from Nueva Pompeya formed a football team to compete in local tournaments. They became known as "the Riestra ones", due to the name of the avenue where they used to gather, right next to a milk store. On February 22, 1931, they formally founded the club, and they rented a place as headquarters later that year.

Riestra affiliated to the Argentine Football Association in 1946, after negotiations by Pascual Trímboli, then president of the club and later head of department in the Association. The Blanquinegro official debut was a 3–2 loss against San Telmo. Riestra played those years in Primera C, but they were later transferred to the new Primera D, becoming one of the founder squads of that division. In 1950 Riestra inaugurated its first stadium in the Villa Soldati neighbourhood.

=== First achievement and stay in Primera C ===
Riestra won its first official tournament in 1953, as Primera D champions. The Blanquinegro squad earned 39 points in 26 games, with a 2-point lead against Juventud de Bernal, in a tournament that also featured Almirante Brown and Deportivo Morón. Deportivo Riestra stayed in Primera C for the next two decades, but without any successful seasons the club was not close to promotion positions. An 18th place in 1963 would have meant relegation for them, but the annulment of relegations that year allowed the team to stay. Riestra won the Reclasificación tournament in 1969, a playoff involving many teams trying to avoid relegation, which would be the only achievement for them in this spell in Primera C. In 1971 the club had its current name after merging with 'Asociación de Fomento Barrio Colón', an organization established in 1929 by businessmen and professionals that performed social activities and lobbied for improvements in the neighbourhood.

Riestra's performance changed in 1977, when the Blanquinegro achieved third place in the Primera C tournament that, even when distance to champions Sarmiento was 10 points, indicated a better shape in play. However, the next seasons showed the team back in the last positions. Finally, Riestra finished last in the 1981 tournament and was relegated for the first time, in the same year that the military dictatorship took its stadium to build a highway.

=== Instability and revival ===
The return to Primera D wouldn't have Riestra in the top positions, but more frequently in the middle of the table. In 1986, after a restructuring of AFA tournaments, a six-month season was played with promotion for the top six teams. Riestra qualified to the Final Round of the tournament after finishing third in its pool with 13 points, only one ahead of rivals Sacachispas. The Blanquinegro then won 4 out of 5 games in the Final Round, winning the tournament and promoting back to Primera C.

The following years were unstable for them, who were not able to keep their spot in Primera C after relegation in its first season back. Three seasons later, Riestra suffered its first (and so far only) disaffiliation after being last in Primera D averages. The season out of competition meant a revival for Riestra, that achieved success in the following season, qualifying for the playoff tournaments three years in a row. In the 1993–94 season, the Blanquinegro squad achieved to be runners-up of both Apertura and Clausura tournaments, and won the playoff championship after defeating Lamadrid 7–0 on aggregate. and Cañuelas 3–2 in the finals. They achieved promotion to Primera C again with a campaign that starred Francisco Berscé as goalkeeper and Julio Sánchez as top scorer, with 19 goals.

Back in Primera C, Riestra was again close to relegation, which was avoided after winning a playoff match 2–1 against Comunicaciones. The following seasons were successful, with two qualifications to playoff for promotion. However, Riestra was not able to keep the good performance, and was relegated back to Primera D in the 2001–02 season. The Blanquinegro squad did not improve in the following years, and by 2005–06 was the second last average of the league, avoiding a new disaffiliation by just one point. Riestra qualified again for playoffs in 2007–08 after 11 seasons, ending the championship in the ninth position. The Malevos achieved a good performance again in the 2008–09 season, when they were runners-up just three points behind champions Midland. A few days later Riestra won the playoff tournament after defeating Argentino de Quilmes 1–0 in the finals, qualifying for the Promotion playoff against Primera C side Defensores Unidos. After winning the first leg 3–2 at home, Riestra lost 1–0 away and was not promoted on rules advantage for the highest tier team.

=== Historic campaigns and double promotion ===
During the following seasons Riestra achieved several good results, qualifying many times to the playoffs, though without getting promotion back to Primera C. In 2011, Riestra became the first Primera D squad to qualify to Copa Argentina's Round of 32. The Blanquinegro side had a remarkable performance in the 2011–12 tournament, in which defeated Muñiz 1–0 in the First Round, and managed to drive Los Andes and Acassuso, two Primera B teams to goalless draws, qualifying on penalty kicks. In a historical draw, Riestra met Quilmes, then a second division team, in San Fernando del Valle de Catamarca, achieving a 0–0 tie and being eliminated only in the penalty kicks.

For the 2012–13 season a sponsor brought to the club an integral project for the development of football, building a semi-professional structure assisted by the counselling of Diego Maradona, which generated an unprecedented publicity of the club in worldwide media. The campaign in that season was again successful for the Blanquinegro, that became again runners-up of the Primera D, after champions Argentino de Quilmes. Riestra was not able to promote after losing playoff finals to Ituzaingó on penalty kicks after a 2–2 aggregate score.

A year later, the Blanquinegro squad achieved their second Primera D championship. They won 75 points, remaining unbeaten throughout the second round of the tournament, and with just 3 losses in the entire season. Jonathan Herrera, with 26 goals, became top scorer of the Primera D championship and of all AFA tournaments combined. The team also featured Jonathan Goya and Bruno Maffoni as midfielders, with 31 games, and Jorge Benítez in defence, in 30 games. This promotion meant for Riestra their debut in professional football for the following season.

The return to Primera C would be successful for the Blanquinegro side, with very quick success. The 2014 season was played in a six-month spell with three promotions due to a new arrangement of AFA tournaments. Surprisingly, Riestra achieved the second position in their pool, 3 points behind winners Defensores de Belgrano, and ahead Dock Sud. The Nueva Pompeya side qualified to the playoffs, where they first met Excursionistas, drawing 2–2 on aggregate and qualifying to the finals on penalty kicks. Riestra met Dock Sud in the finals and defeated them 4–1 on aggregate to promote to Primera B for the first time in history. Riestra featured Gustavo Ruhl as goalkeeper in every match of the tournament, and Gonzalo Peralta as defender in all but one games. Jonathan Herrera scored 19 goals and became top scorer of all tournaments combined for the second season in a row. The Blanquinegro squad thus achieved two promotions within one year, an accomplishment a few times seen in Argentine football.

=== Current events ===
Riestra's debut in Primera B Metropolitana came with success. They managed to defeat more experienced sides as Platense and Almirante Brown, and also Brown and Almagro, the sides that would be promoted that season. These results drove the Blanquinegro side to the top positions of the tournament at the beginning, reaching third by the end of the first round. However, Riestra showed a poor performance in the second round that left them in the 14th position by the end of the season, thus missing playoffs but managing to stay in the division, which was their initial goal. As a distinctive achievement Jonathan Herrera became top scorer of all AFA tournaments for the third time in a row, an unparalleled feat in modern Argentine football.

Regarding the cup competition the Blanquinegro side reached Round of 32 for the second time, in which they first met a Primera División side, losing 3–1 to Rosario Central.

The Malevos signed many new players for the six-month 2016 season, especially defenders, with the objective of avoiding relegation once again. The results were not good at the beginning, with a 7 matches winless streak. After a coach change results improved and Riestra managed to win five games and stay in Primera B for another season.

The team accomplished their best historical performance in the 2016–17 league season, becoming runners-up of the Primera B Metropolitana in their third season in the division. Riestra placed in the top positions since the beginning and was the top scorer team in the season, with 53 goals in 36 games, scoring more than three at home against Defensores de Belgrano, Platense and Talleres, and also away at Almirante Brown and Colegiales. In the playoffs, Riestra reached the finals after a home draw against Platense and an aggregate 2–1 win against Deportivo Español. The finals featured 4th placed team Comunicaciones amidst some controversy due to a field invasion with five minutes to go, allegedly by a Riestra player, and also other regulation breaches reported by rivals and the press. AFA upheld some of the accusations while dismissed others, and decided continuation of the match in a neutral field, and several penalties for Deportivo Riestra, including a 20-point deduction the following season, later reduced to 10 points on an appeal. The match went on a few days later with a Blanquinegro victory 2–1, which were promoted to the second division for the first time in their history.

The Blanquinegro squad also achieved their best in the cup competition of the season, reaching the Round of 16 for the first time after defeating Tigre on penalty kicks, before being eliminated once again by Rosario Central.

The team had some remarkable matches in their Primera B Nacional debut, including victories against the top three teams in the competition: Aldosivi, Almagro and San Martín. Despite their campaign, that would have had the team qualified to the Reducido, Riestra ended the season in the relegation zone due to the 10-point deduction related to previous season incidents. The club made an appeal at the Court of Arbitration for Sports, which agreed to take the case, an unprecedented event in Argentine football. After a negative decision from the Court, Riestra was relegated back to Primera B Metropolitana for the next season.

Riestra kept the roster mostly unchanged back in the third division, completing a 17-match undefeated strike that made them lead the tournament. However, 4 defeats in a row took them down to the sixth position. After a change in management and the return of Jonathan Herrera back from loan, the Nueva Pompeya squad would complete another set of 11 matches without losses, including two victories against derby rivals Sacachispas. The Blanquinegros clinched a spot in the next Primera B Nacional season after finishing fourth in the league. Riestra's Gonzalo Bravo was the top goalscorer of the tournament, with 20 goals in the season.

Back to second division, Riestra reached the fourth position in Zone B of the 2019–20 season when the tournament was cancelled due to the COVID-19 pandemic in Argentina. A reduced 2020 season was played when football tournaments resumed, with Riestra defeating Temperley and Deportivo Morón in the knockout rounds before losing to Platense in the quarterfinals. The following season the Blanquinegro side wouldn't meet success, finishing 15th out of 17 teams in Zone A. Riestra improved their performance in the 2022 season, reaching the 11th spot, though they were knocked out early in the Reducido against Estudiantes (Río Cuarto).

The 2023 Primera Nacional tournament started with Riestra struggling to reach top positions, which led to coach Cristian Fabbiani being replaced. After mid-season player transfers, Walter Acuña returned for a second spell at the club, while goalkeeper Ignacio Arce and defender Nahuel Iribarren signed to improve the squad. The Blanquinegros then started to hike positions in Zone B, and after hiring Matías Módolo as coach Riestra qualified for the Torneo Reducido. After an undefeated spell knocking out San Martín de Tucumán, Quilmes and Almirante Brown, Deportivo Riestra achieved an unprecedented promotion to Primera División for the first time in history from next season after defeating Deportivo Maipú in the final.

Deportivo Riestra’s debut season in the Argentine Primera División began with the 2024 Copa de la Liga Profesional, in which the club drew 0–0 away to Instituto, earning its first-ever point in Argentina’s top flight on the opening matchday. On matchday five, against Vélez Sarsfield, Riestra scored its first top-division goal, converted by Mauro Ortiz. The following round saw El Malevo claim its first victory, defeating Atlético Tucumán 1–0 with a goal by Milton Céliz. On 15 March, Riestra secured a 1–0 home win over Independiente, with a goal by Pedro Ramírez, marking its first victory against one of the so-called “big five” clubs in Argentine football. Riestra finished the Copa de la Liga in the lower positions of its group with 13 points and therefore failed to advance to the quarter-finals.

In its first participation in the Primera División championship, Riestra won its opening match 1–0 against local rival San Lorenzo, with a goal by Jonathan Herrera. The team achieved several historic victories, including a 2–0 win over River Plate on matchday five. As a result, the black-and-white side recorded three wins against members of the Argentine “big five” during its debut season in the top tier. The campaign continued with mixed results, highlighted by Riestra’s strong home form, which made it the best-performing home team in the league. This achievement contrasted sharply with its poor away record, as the club failed to win any matches on the road. Riestra ended the season without victories in its final nine matchdays, which caused it to drop out of the top positions, although it faced no risk of relegation due to the suspension of relegations decreed by the Argentine Football Association (AFA) for that season.

The club from the Pompeya neighborhood approached the 2025 Argentine Primera División season with largely the same squad as the previous year. El Malevo maintained its home strength, remaining unbeaten and extending its run to become the longest in the club’s history. In the Apertura Tournament, the team finished fifth in Zone B, qualifying for the knockout stage, where it was eliminated by Huracán in the round of 16. In the 2025 Copa Argentina, Riestra achieved its best-ever performance in the competition, advancing through two rounds before being eliminated, once again in the round of 16, by Racing Club.

Riestra improved its performance in the Clausura Tournament, leading its group for several matchdays and achieving a landmark victory over River Plate at the Estadio Monumental. The team set two defensive records: it completed a 27-match unbeaten run at home, which ended after one year and five months with a defeat against Independiente; and, also at home, it recorded 11 consecutive matches without conceding a goal, the fourth-best such streak in the history of Argentine football. The season once again concluded in the round of 16, this time with a defeat to Barracas Central. Deportivo Riestra finished sixth in the aggregate table, which secured qualification for the 2026 Copa Sudamericana, marking the club’s first-ever appearance in international competition.

== Playing kit ==
Traditional Deportivo Riestra striped kit, worn until 2012

Deportivo Riestra's kit has traditionally been black and white vertical stripes, aligned with the club's colours, which were taken from the ancient El Trueno (Spanish for The Thunder) team, who lent old kits to Riestra in their beginnings. Starting in 2012, with the arrival of a new sponsor, Riestra wears black shirts with white details.

=== Sponsors and manufacturers ===
Period	Kit Manufacturer	Shirt Sponsors
1980–83	(Argentina) Uribarri	(None)
1984–87	(Argentina) Uribarri	Hojalata Nor-Pa S.A.
1987–90	(Argentina) Uribarri	Alfajores Guaymallén
1990–92	(Argentina) Uribarri	Transportes DM
1992–93	(Germany) Uhlsport	Transportes DM
1993–94	(Argentina) Ranking	Transportes DM
1994–95	(Argentina) Ranking	Apache Jeans & Jackets
1995–96	(Argentina) D-Tap	Farmacia Real
1996–97	(Argentina) Sportlandia	Santín Seguros
1997–99	(Argentina) Sportlandia	Farmacia Real
1999–00	(Argentina) Kalong	Dol-Out Spray
2000–01	(Argentina) Don Balón	Dol-Out Spray
2001–02	(Argentina) Mebal	Futbol5.tv
2002–03	(Argentina) Iponoo	Transportes Imaz
2003–04	(Argentina) Iponoo	La Nueva Seguros
2004–06	(Argentina) Dana	La Nueva Seguros
2006–07	(Argentina) AM Sport	La Nueva Seguros
2007	(Germany) Adidas	NEC
2008	(Argentina) Dana	NEC
2008–09	(Argentina) For Export	Tao-it
2009–11	(Argentina) Dana	La Nueva Seguros
2011–12	(Argentina) KDY	Kainos
2012–13	(Argentina) KDY	Speed Unlimited
2013–present	(Germany) Adidas	Speed Unlimited

== Stadium ==
Deportivo Riestra own the Guillermo Laza stadium, where they send their home matches. Located in the Villa Soldati neighbourhood in Buenos Aires, it has a capacity is 3,000 in its three stands, one of which is for seating. Its facilities include press cabins, training field and indoor stadium.

== Players ==
=== Current squad ===
As of 23 September 2026

Note: Flags indicate national team as defined under FIFA eligibility rules; some limited exceptions apply. Players may hold more than one non-FIFA nationality.

No.	Pos.	Nation	Player
1	GK	ARG	Ignacio Arce
2	DF	ARG	Carlos Quintana
3	DF	ARG	Eric Tovo
4	DF	COL	Yeison Murillo
5	DF	ARG	Pedro Ramírez
6	DF	ARG	Ignacio Gariglio
7	FW	URU	Antony Alonso
8	MF	ARG	Milton Céliz (captain)
9	FW	ARG	Nicolás Benegas
10	MF	ARG	Braian Sánchez
11	FW	ARG	Alexander Díaz
12	GK	ARG	Iván López (on loan from Deportivo Armenio)
13	DF	ARG	Rodrigo Gallo
14	MF	ARG	Pablo Monje
15	DF	ARG	Nicolás Sansotre

No.	Pos.	Nation	Player
16	MF	ARG	Nicolás Watson (on loan from Instituto)
17	FW	ARG	Ángel Almada
19	DF	ARG	Juan Randazzo
20	MF	ARG	Thiago Lauro
21	FW	ARG	Tomás González (on loan from Unión Santa Fe)
22	DF	ARG	Cristian Paz
23	GK	PAR	Marino Arzamendia
24	DF	ARG	Facundo Miño (on loan from Almirante Brown)
27	MF	ARG	Jonatan Goitía
29	FW	ARG	Agustín Graneros
31	MF	ARG	Mauro Smarra
32	FW	ARG	Gonzalo Flores (on loan from Almirante Brown)
35	FW	ARG	Ángel Stringa
36	DF	ARG	Mariano Bracamonte
40	FW	ARG	Gabriel Obredor

=== Reserve squad ===
Note: Flags indicate national team as defined under FIFA eligibility rules; some limited exceptions apply. Players may hold more than one non-FIFA nationality.

No.	Pos.	Nation	Player
18	MF	ARG	Benjamín Pérez
26	GK	ARG	Jorge Luque
33	DF	ARG	Justo Rodríguez Ares
34	MF	ARG	Alejo Duarte
37	MF	ARG	Dariel Sánchez
41	DF	ARG	Lautaro Córtez
42	MF	ARG	Luciano Cremona

No.	Pos.	Nation	Player
43	MF	ARG	Luciano De Reatti
44	GK	ARG	Francisco De Zuñiga
45	FW	ARG	Fabricio Ventresca
46	FW	ARG	Benjamín Rojas
48	FW	ARG	Mateo Straffurini
49	FW	ARG	Ronald Villafañe
50	FW	ARG	Thiago Montenegro

=== Out on loan ===
Note: Flags indicate national team as defined under FIFA eligibility rules; some limited exceptions apply. Players may hold more than one non-FIFA nationality.

No.	Pos.	Nation	Player
3	DF	ARG	Eric Tovo (at Almirante Brown until 31 December 2026)
3	DF	ARG	Nicolás Caro Torres (at Estudiantes BA until 31 December 2026)
8	MF	ARG	Milton Céliz (at Barcelona SC until 31 December 2026)
10	MF	ARG	Gonzalo Bravo (at Ituzaingó until 31 December 2026)

No.	Pos.	Nation	Player
11	FW	ARG	Gustavo Fernández (at Mitre until 31 December 2026)
18	FW	ARG	Ramón González (at Almirante Brown until 31 December 2026)
38	FW	ARG	Carlos Gugenheim (at Almirante Brown until 31 December 2026)
47	FW	ARG	Thiago Romero (at Guaraní until 30 June 2027)

=== Records ===
==== Most goals ====
No.	Player	Pos.	Tenure	Goals
1	(Argentina) Jonathan Herrera	FW	2013–17, 2019	104
2	(Argentina) Gonzalo Bravo	MF	2014–	40
3	(Argentina) Diego Díaz		1987–89	33
4	(Argentina) Fernando Peralta	FW	1922–32	31
5	(Mexico) Christian Buglione	FW	2008–12	29

==== Most appearances ====
No.	Player	Pos.	Tenure	Goals
1	(Argentina) Jonatan Goya	MF	2008–19, 2021–	279
2	(Argentina) Mauricio Soto	MF	2009, 2014–	214
3	(Argentina) Leandro Freyre		2009–17	205
4	(Argentina) Leandro Moreyra		2010–19	187
5	(Argentina) Gustavo Benítez	DF	2013–	180

== Honours ==
=== National ===
- Primera D (2): 1953, 2013–14

== Other sports and social activities ==
=== Youth football ===
Besides professional football, Deportivo Riestra is home to a Reserves team and amateur youth teams, both within AFA and local tournaments. Riestra also fields a team in the official Senior Tournament.

=== Futsal ===
Riestra started practising futsal in 2012 in AFA second division. After a spell in their participation, the club resumed the team in 2017 at Primera D, fourth division in the futsal league system. Riestra's futsal section also has Reserves and youth teams.

=== Other ===
Deportivo Riestra has traditionally had a chess section, affiliated to the Metropolitan Chess Federation, and more recently the Copa Cultura AFA, which they won in 2017. The club's headquarters also host recreational sports and activities such as boxing, roller skating, martial arts, yoga and tango, and a retirees club.
