= Defensores Unidos =

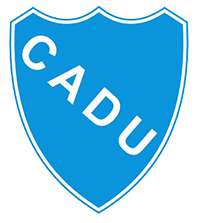
- Full name: Club Atlético Defensores Unidos
- Nicknames: Cadu; Defensores; Celestes
- Founded: 14 July 1914; 112 years ago
- Ground: Estadio Gigante de Villa Fox, Zárate, Buenos Aires
- Capacity: 6,000
- Chairman: Alberto Ojeda
- Manager: Martín Rolón
- League: Primera B
- 2025: Primera Nacional Zone B, 18th of 18 (relegated)
Home colours	Away colours	Third colours

Club Atlético Defensores Unidos (simply known as Defensores Unidos) is an Argentine football club from the Villa Fox district of Zárate, Buenos Aires. The team currently plays in Primera B Metropolitana, the third division of Argentine football league system.

== Players ==
=== Current squad ===
As of 19 May 2019.

Note: Flags indicate national team as defined under FIFA eligibility rules; some limited exceptions apply. Players may hold more than one non-FIFA nationality.

No.	Pos.	Nation	Player
—	GK	ARG	Fabricio Henricot
—	GK	ARG	Mauricio Aquino
—	GK	ARG	Jaime Barceló
—	DF	ARG	Ariel Morales
—	DF	ARG	Matías Mariatti
—	DF	ARG	Damián Zadel
—	DF	ARG	Matías Contreras
—	DF	ARG	Luis Olivera
—	DF	PER	Luis Martínez
—	DF	ARG	Matías Rapetti
—	DF	ARG	Juan Cruz Ponce
—	DF	ARG	Nicolás Alarcón
—	DF	ARG	Lautaro Arregui
—	MF	USA	Jonathan Suárez

No.	Pos.	Nation	Player
—	MF	ARG	Franco Sivetti
—	MF	ARG	Matías Nizzo
—	MF	ARG	Nicolás Cavagnero
—	MF	ARG	Brian Guerra
—	MF	ARG	Maximiliano Ortigoza
—	MF	PAR	Kevin Fernández
—	MF	ARG	Felipe Palazuelo
—	MF	ARG	Guido Lopez
—	FW	ARG	Rodrigo Hernández
—	FW	ARG	Nicolás González
—	FW	ARG	Franco Lonardi
—	FW	ARG	Martín Peralta
—	FW	ARG	Javier Velázquez (captain)
—	FW	ARG	Franco Caballero

== Honours ==
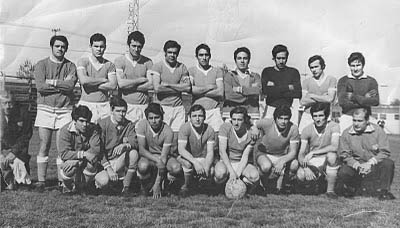
The team that achieved the Primera D championship in 1969.

=== National ===
- Primera B Metropolitana
  - Winners (1): 2022
- Primera C
  - Winners (2): 1993-94, 2017-18
- Primera de Aficionados
  - Winners (1): 1969
- Primera D
  - Winners (1): 2007-08
