= Toshiba EMU (Roca Line) =

Rail rolling stock used in Argentina

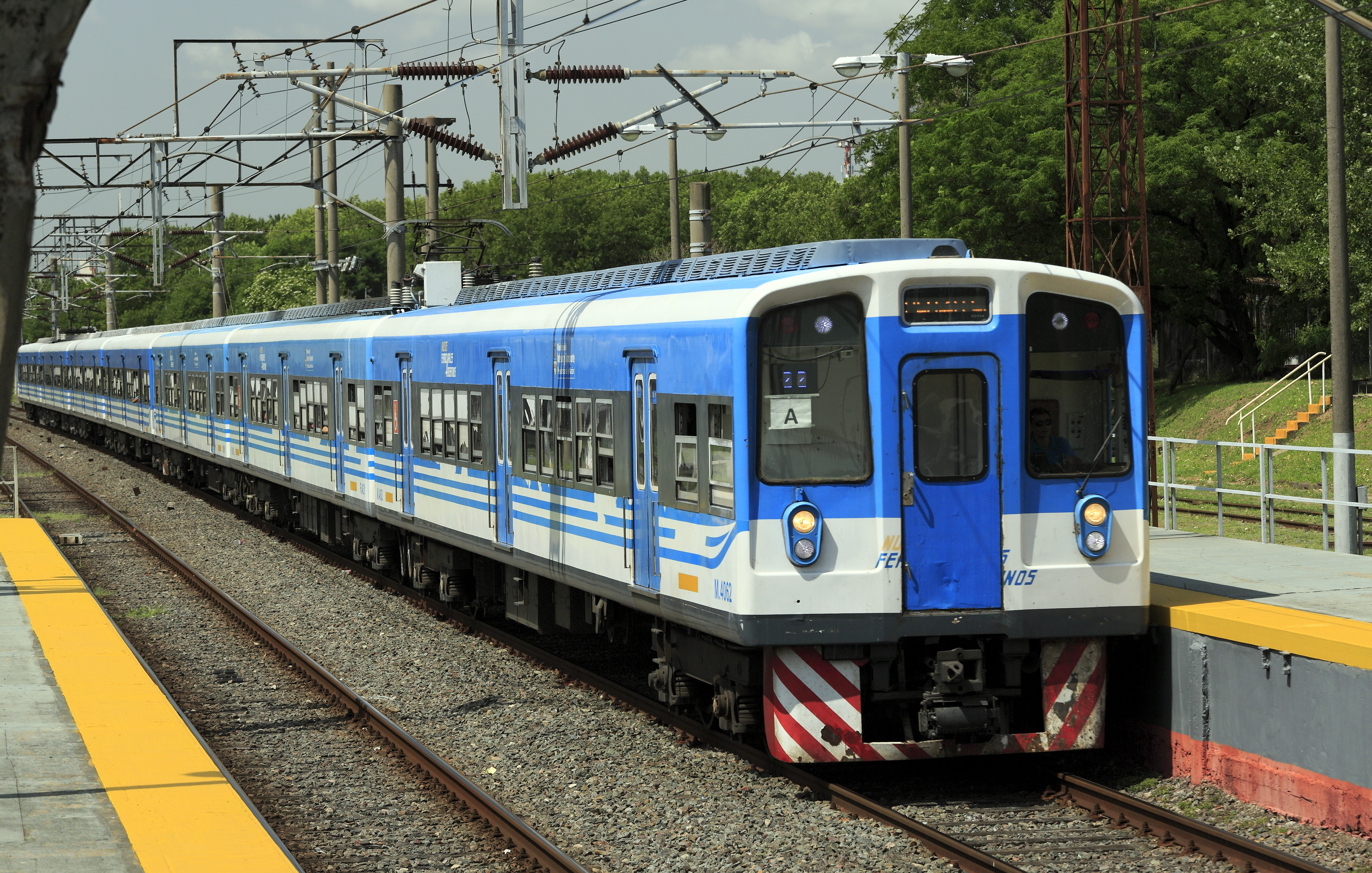
- Toshiba train in Remedios de Escalada (2020)

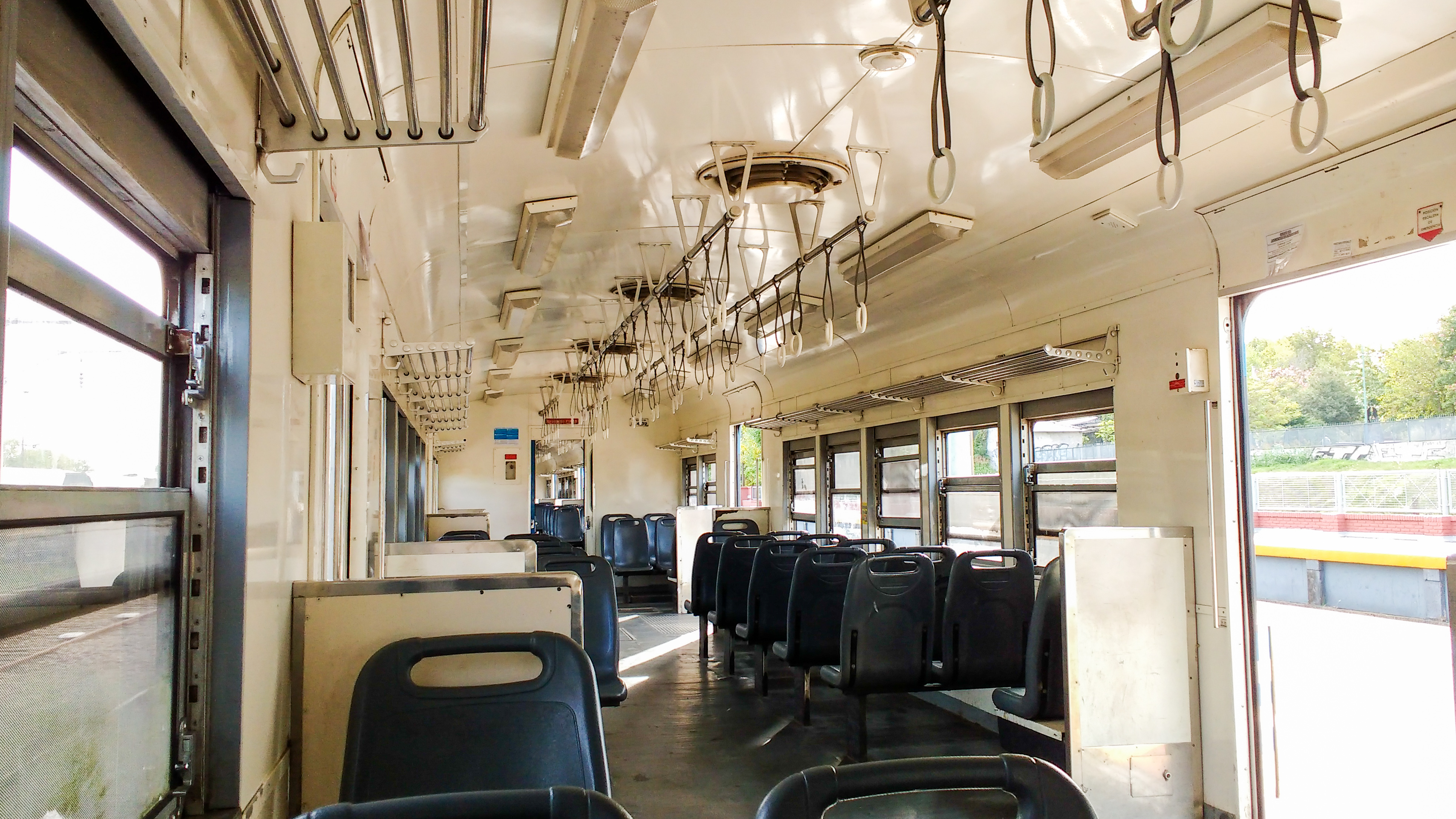
- Downgraded interior (2017)
- In service: 1985 - Present
- Manufacturers: Nippon Sharyo; Kawasaki Heavy Industries; Tokyu Car; Kinki Sharyo; Hitachi; Toshiba; Fabricaciones Militares; Materfer; Siam Di Tella
- Assembly: Argentina; Japan
- Constructed: 1983 - 1985
- Refurbished: 2003-2012,2013
- Formation: 7 cars; M+R+M / M+R+R'+M

Specifications
- Car length: 25 m (82 ft 0 in)
- Doors: 3 per side
- Maximum speed: 120 km/h (75 mph)
- Electric system: 25 kV 50 Hz AC overhead line
- Current collection: Pantograph (AC)
- Braking system: air
- Safety system: ATS
- Track gauge: 1,676 mm (5 ft 6 in)

The Toshiba EMU is an electric multiple unit train model used in the Roca Line in the Southern Buenos Aires Metropolitan Area, Argentina.

The trains operate in sets of two semi-permanently coupled units, formed by: four motor cabin cars (two used for conduction, and two unused in the middle of the train) named as M (for motor), two trailer cars (named as R, remolque) and a "trailer prime" (named as R'), an extra car which is not factory original to this trains, but had to be added after-hands to attend the increase in demand of the Roca Line. Overall, the Toshiba sets have seven cars, but circulation is interrupted in the middle of the set by the conduction cabins, in an M-R-M/M-R-R'-M consist.

Construction began in 1984 in Japan by a company consortium led by Nippon Sharyo and Toshiba, with the participation of Tokyu Car, Kawasaki, Kinki Sharyo, Toshiba and Hitachi. Toshiba was in charge of the motor equipment, so the trains started being named after that company. The first 102 cars were built in the Asian nation and, in 1985, Fabricaciones Militares (Military Works) built 54 in Argentina. An extra 28 "trailer prime" cars were built by Materfer to increase the trains capacity. This model resembles the Japanese Odakyu 9000 series, also manufactured by Tokyu Car and Kawasaki.

These were the first electric trains in Argentina to operate under 25 kV alternate current, and to use the ATS safety system. They replaced push-pull diesel trains built by Materfer in the Roca Line Ezeiza and Glew branches.

Since 2016, some of the trains were replaced by newer CSR units, but an approximate 20 Toshiba trainsets still operate daily.

== History ==
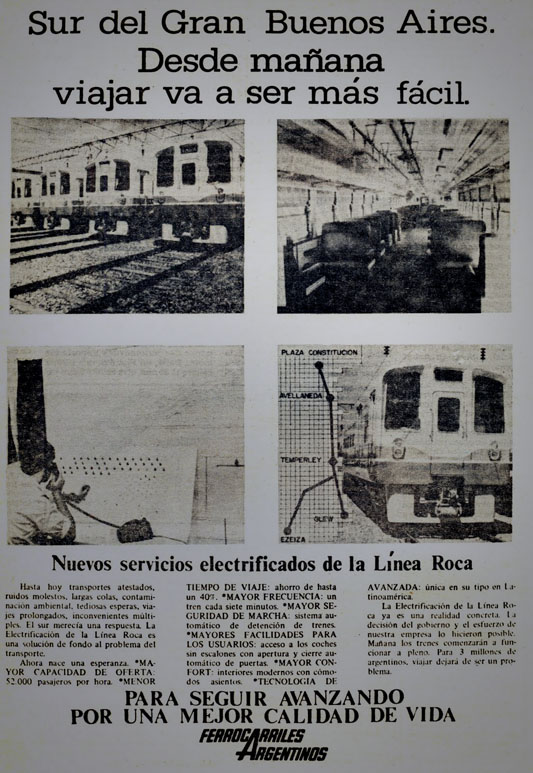
Poster promoting the new Electric services

In 1973, the Argentine government ordered a study on the electrification of urban lines in the Roca Line to a group of Argentine and Japanese companies. In February 1979, after beating British Railways, a contract was awarded to Marubeni, Toshiba and Hitachi to start the works.

The purchase of this trains also led to a transfer of technology agreement between the Japan International Cooperation Agency and Ferrocarriles Argentinos, which resulted in the creation of CENACAF (Centro Nacional de Capacitación Ferroviaria, National Centre of Rail Training".

The first cars arrived in Argentina on July 25, 1983, on the "Amanda Smiths" ship, and were sent to the main repair shop of the Roca Railway, the Remedios de Escalada Shops. At this time, the Roca Line was under electrification works, which also comprised the creation of a specialized shop for electric multiple units in Llavallol, where the Toshiba trains are maintained as of 2018.

On the November 6th, 1985, a Toshiba train made the inaugural trip of the new Electric service on the Roca Line, transporting the then-president Raúl Alfonsín between the Constitución and Avellaneda stations.

The new Electric service represented a great improvement in transport quality from the old diesel push-pull trains on the Roca Railway, and caused a spike in demand. To cope with the resultant demand, an extra car (which was not included in the original Japanese design) was built by Materfer in Argentina and added to each trainset. The new trailer car was named "trailer prime". This was criticized by some technicians, who claimed it undermined the train acceleration and braking.

Since 2002, metal blinds were removed from the trains, in what was called a theft of State property by then-concessionaire Metropolitano, controlled by Sergio Taselli. The company claimed it was due to vandalism, so they implemented a series of reforms to make the trains "anti-vandalic". This reforms replaced the original leather coach-like seats, which also had flip-over seat backs to face the direction of travel., with fixed metal seats with no padding. The metal window frames were replaced with plastic frames. Also, seats were removed in some cars to make space for bikes and wheelchairs.

From then on, the trains suffered a series of reforms which diminished their comfort. The metal seats were eventually replaced by plain plastic seats, with no comfort and fixed facing one direction. The trains were not repaired in-house by the Roca Railway, but instead sent to EMEPA, Benito Roggio Ferroindustrial and Materfer for repairs. Since the Argentine State, through Trenes Argentinos, took control of the operation again in XXX, they have been repaired primarily in the Remedios de Escalada Shops.

== Technical specifications ==
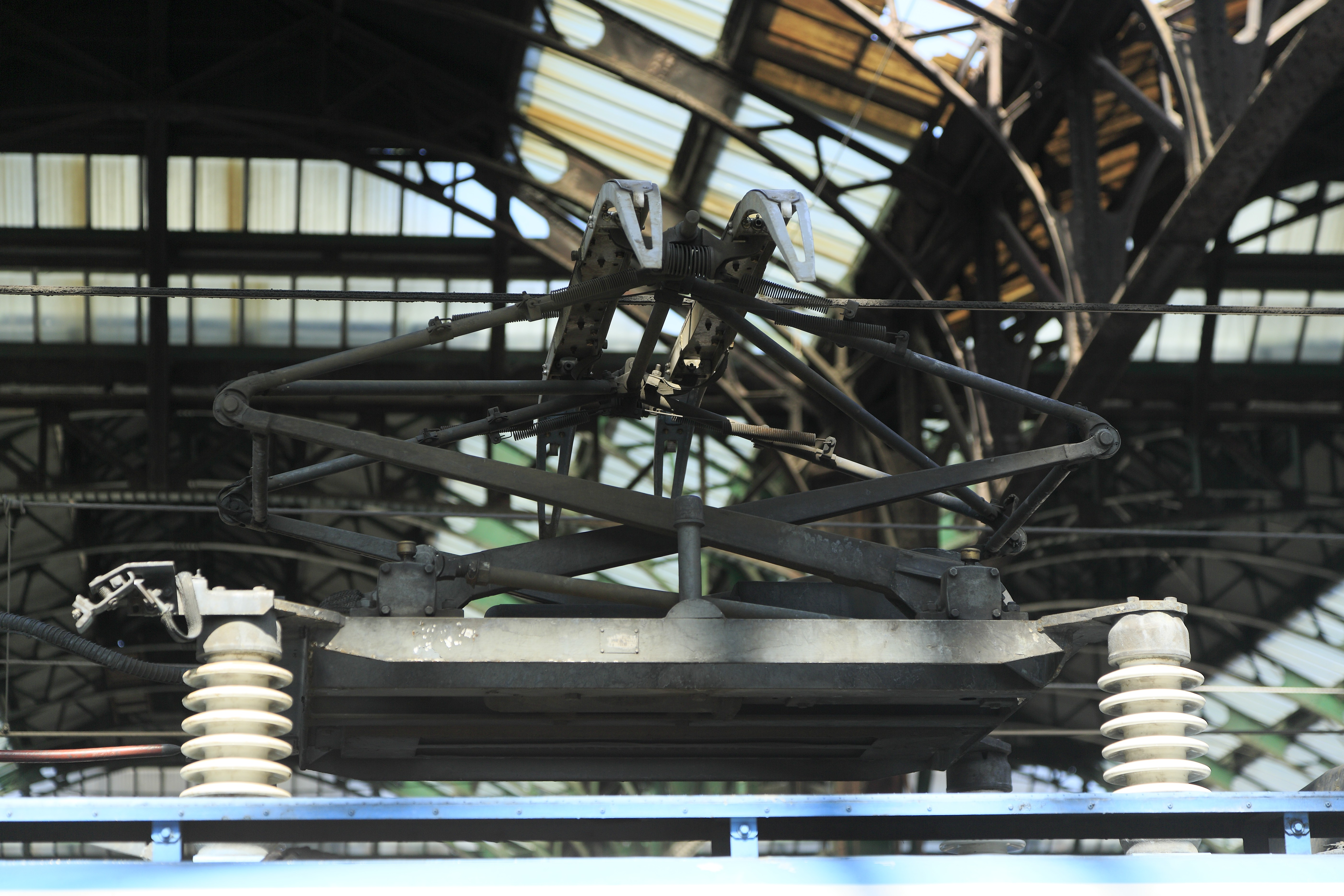
Toshiba EMU Pantograph

The trains have a maximum speed of 120 km/h (75 mph) and feature a limiter which cuts off the engines above 126 km/h (78 mph). Energy is taken from a 25 kV alternate current overhead line using double arm pantographs.

They operate on the ATS signaling system provided by Nippon Signal, which stops the train when trespassing a red signal or overreaching the maximum speed.

Cars are 25 m (82 ft 0 in) long. Cab motor cars have a 52-tonne (51.2-long-ton; 57.3-short-ton) weight, and trailer cars weigh 51 tonnes (50.2 long tons; 56.2 short tons). Motor cars are equipped by eight SE629 Toshiba 600V engines, each of which is rated at 300 horsepower (220 kW).

The trains have air brakes, continuous and automatic, assisted by a Rheostatic dynamic braking system operating between 90 and 20 kilometres per hour (56 and 12 mph).

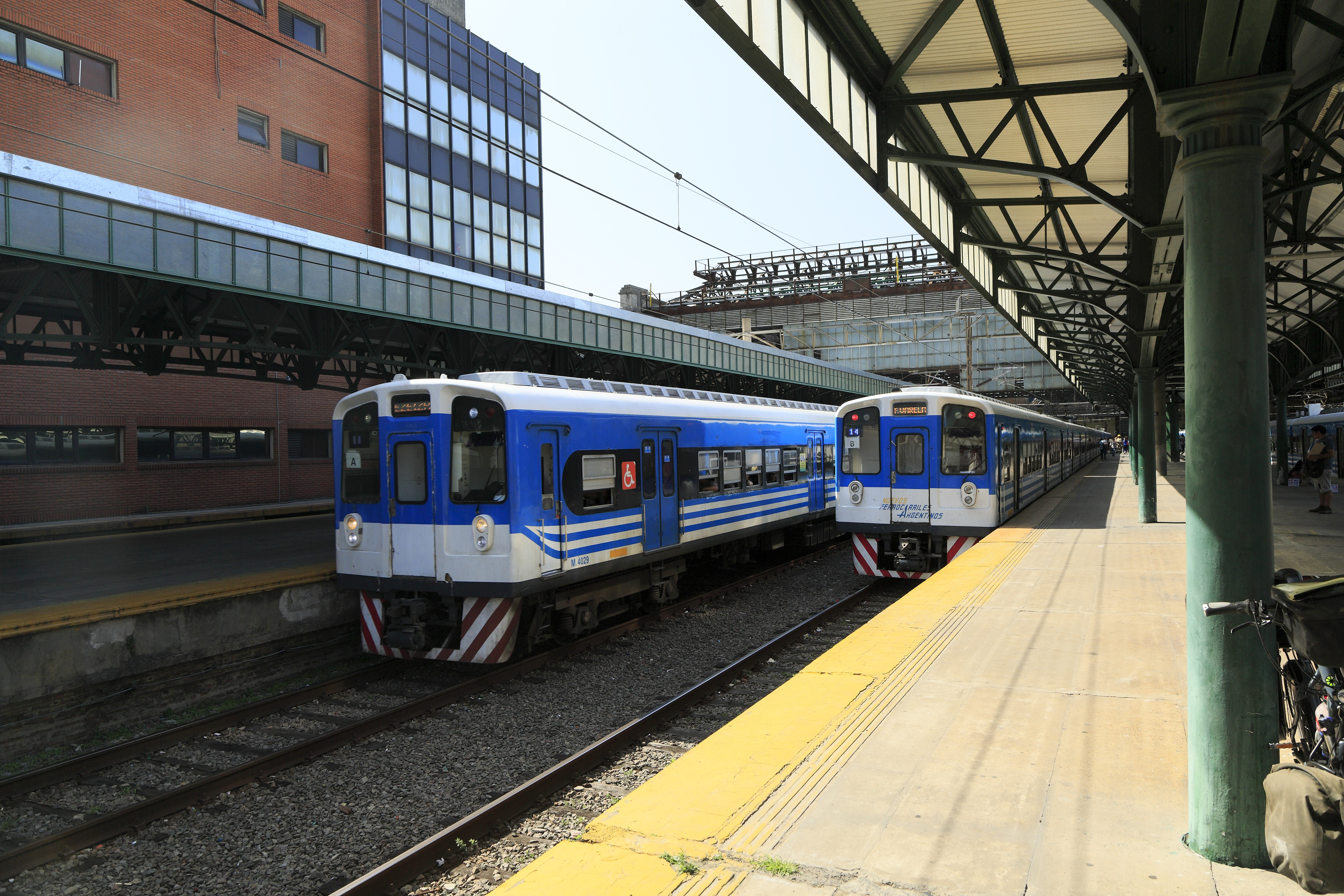
Toshiba trains in the Constitución Terminal Station

These EMUs have three double doors on each side of all cars. Doors are opened by the driver and closed by the conductor, using a panel next to the first and last doors of each car. Doors can also be closed from the cabin, if necessary. A security device blocks the train to depart a station if any doors are still open.

The trains originally had Rollsigns to indicate the destination, but were upgraded to LED signs under the UGOFE administration of Roca Line.

== Operation ==
The trains operate in the urban and suburban section of the Roca Railway since 1985, between the central station Constitución and the Glew and Ezeiza terminals in the south area of Greater Buenos Aires.

Since 2015, they also operate in the Claypole branch and, since 2017, in the La Plata and Bosques branches, following the electrification of those services.

== Liveries ==
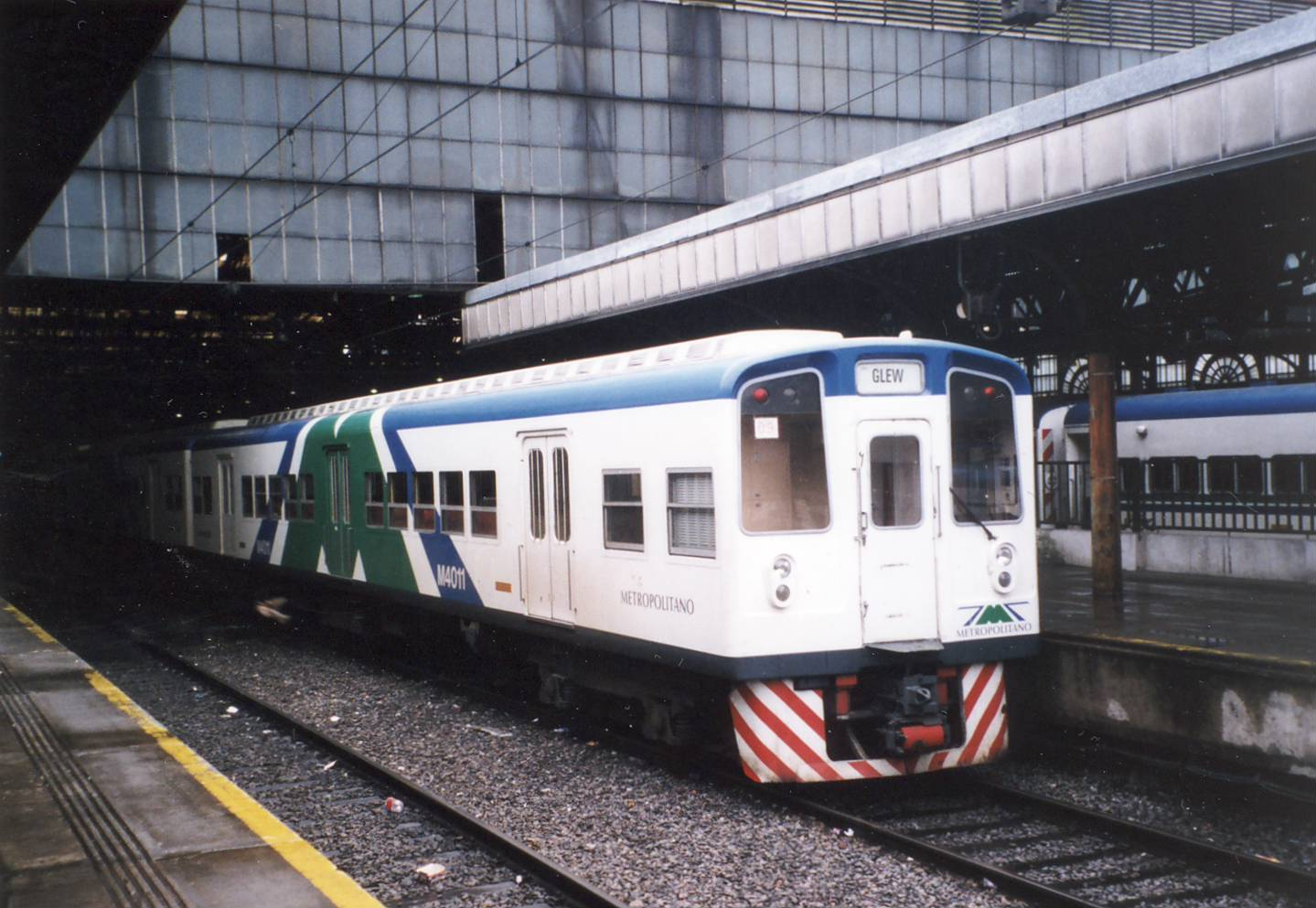
First Metropolitano Livery

Original to Mid-1990s: White body, with red and green bands close under the windows. First, with Ferrocarriles Argentinos (Argentine Railways) logos, then same livery but FEMESA (Ferrocarriles Metropolitanos SA, Metropolitan Railways) logos. This scheme could be still be seen until about 2003.

Mid-1990s - Early 2000s: After the privatization and when Metropolitano started to run the line, the paint job was changed to: White front and sides of the body, blue roof, with a large blue and green "M" letter painted. It was seen until around 2011.

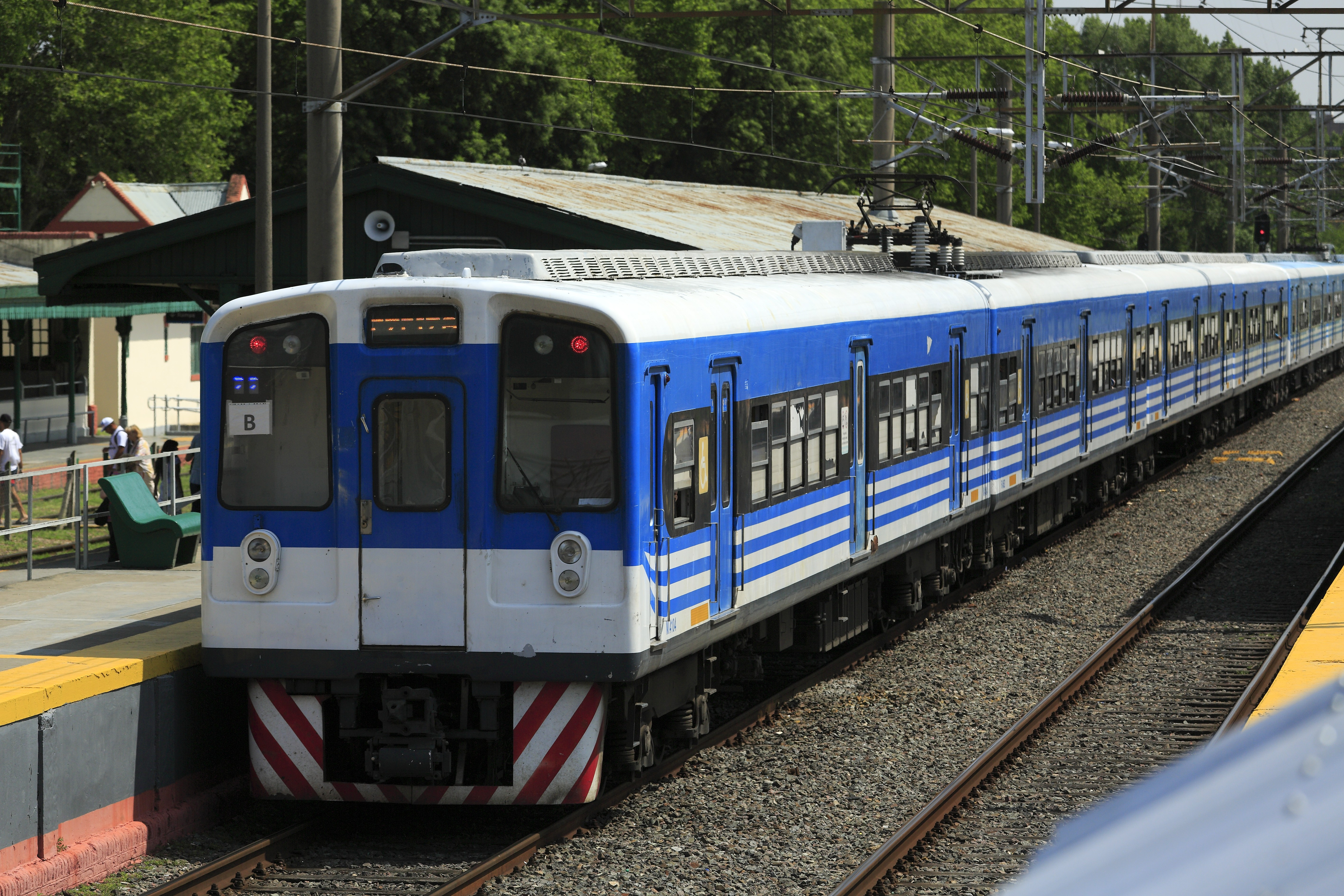
Latest livery

Early 2000s - 2007: White front and sides of the body, blue roof, blue and green bands under the windoes. This was the second version of the Metropolitano paint job, popularly named as "Refrigerator Livery" ("Esquema Heladera") and could be seen until around 2011. It was believed this new livery was implemented as a cost-cutting measure due to the economic crisis.

2008 - 2014: As the Argentine government took the line from Metropolitano due to several contract violations, the Toshiba trains started being run by UGOFE, which created a new livery: Dark blue body with silver lines, and the letters LGR painted under the cab car front door and in the lower middle side section of each car. Trains were repainted as they entered to maintenance. It could be still seen in 2019.

2012 - 2014: A new livery was created, similar to the UGOFE designed, but using an all-light-blue body paint.

2014 - Today: As the new CSR EMUs entered service, their livery was adapted to the Toshiba trains: Light-blue body with white lines, and a dark stripe along the windows.

== Incidents ==
In 1998, an arson in the Constitución Station damaged one car.

In May 2007, several Toshiba Cars were torched in the Constitución Terminal station, following big delays, and after years of poor service in the Roca Line from private operator Metropolitano. This caused a contract break between the State and the company a week after the incidents.

In October 2007, an EMU derailed between the Adrogué and Burzaco stations, taking down several concrete poles of the railway's overhead line.
