= Roca Line =

Commuter rail service in Buenos Aires

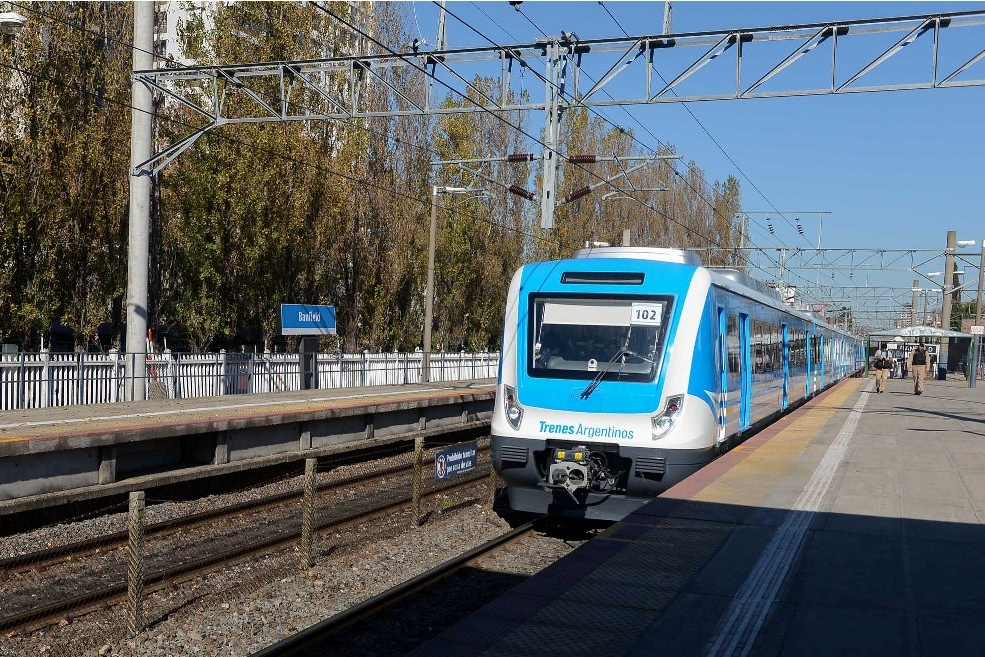
- A CSR multiple unit at Banfield station

Overview
- Service type: Commuter rail
- Status: Active
- Locale: Buenos Aires Province
- Predecessor: BA Great Southern Railway
- First service: 1948; 78 years ago
- Current operator: Trenes Argentinos
- Former operator: Argentren
- Ridership: 101,490,327 (2019)
- Website: Roca Line

Route
- Termini: Constitución List: Ezeiza; A. Korn; La Plata; Bosques; Cañuelas; Chascomús; Haedo; Gutiérrez; Lobos
- Stops: 70
- Distance travelled: 198 km

Technical
- Rolling stock: Toshiba EMUs; CSR EMUs
- Track gauge: 1,676 mm (5 ft 6 in)
- Electrification: 25 kV 50 Hz AC overhead lines
- Track owner: Government of Argentina

The Roca line is a 1,676 mm (5 ft 6 in) gauge commuter rail service in the Buenos Aires Province, Argentina, part of General Roca Railway network. The service is currently operated by State-owned company Trenes Argentinos, from the city-centre terminus of Constitución south to Ezeiza, Alejandro Korn, La Plata, Cañuelas, Chascomús, Gutiérrez and Lobos, and west to Sarmiento Line's station Haedo. The transfer stations between the branch lines are Avellaneda, Temperley, Bosques and Berazategui.

The line consists of 198 kilometres of track (55 of which are electrified), 70 stations, 146 grade crossings, 907 daily services through its different branches, and carries half a million passengers daily, making it the longest and most extensively used line of the Buenos Aires commuter rail network. Large electrification and infrastructure improvement works were undertaken on the line in the early 2010s, with brand new electric multiple units entering service on 8 June 2015.

== History ==
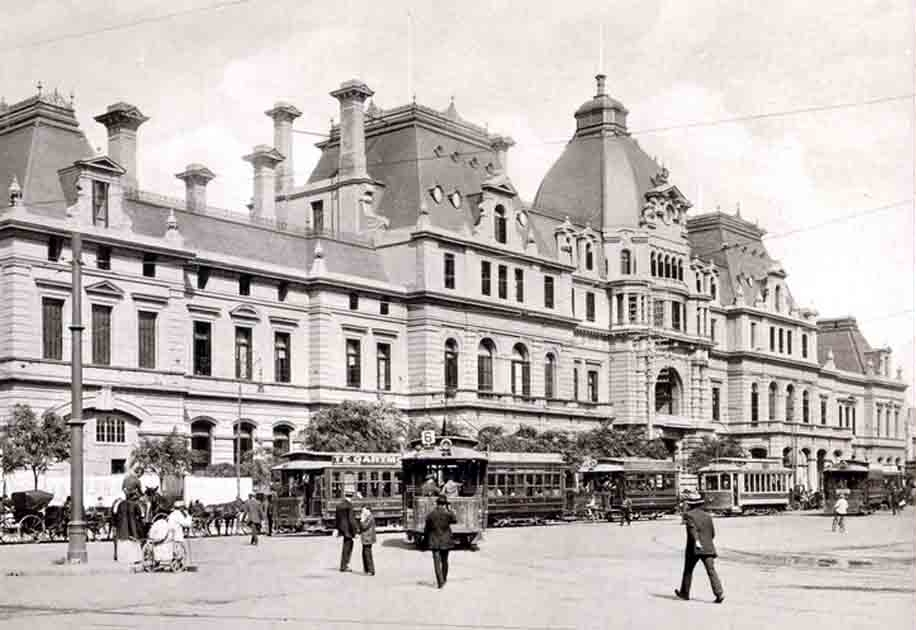
Constitución railway station (1912)

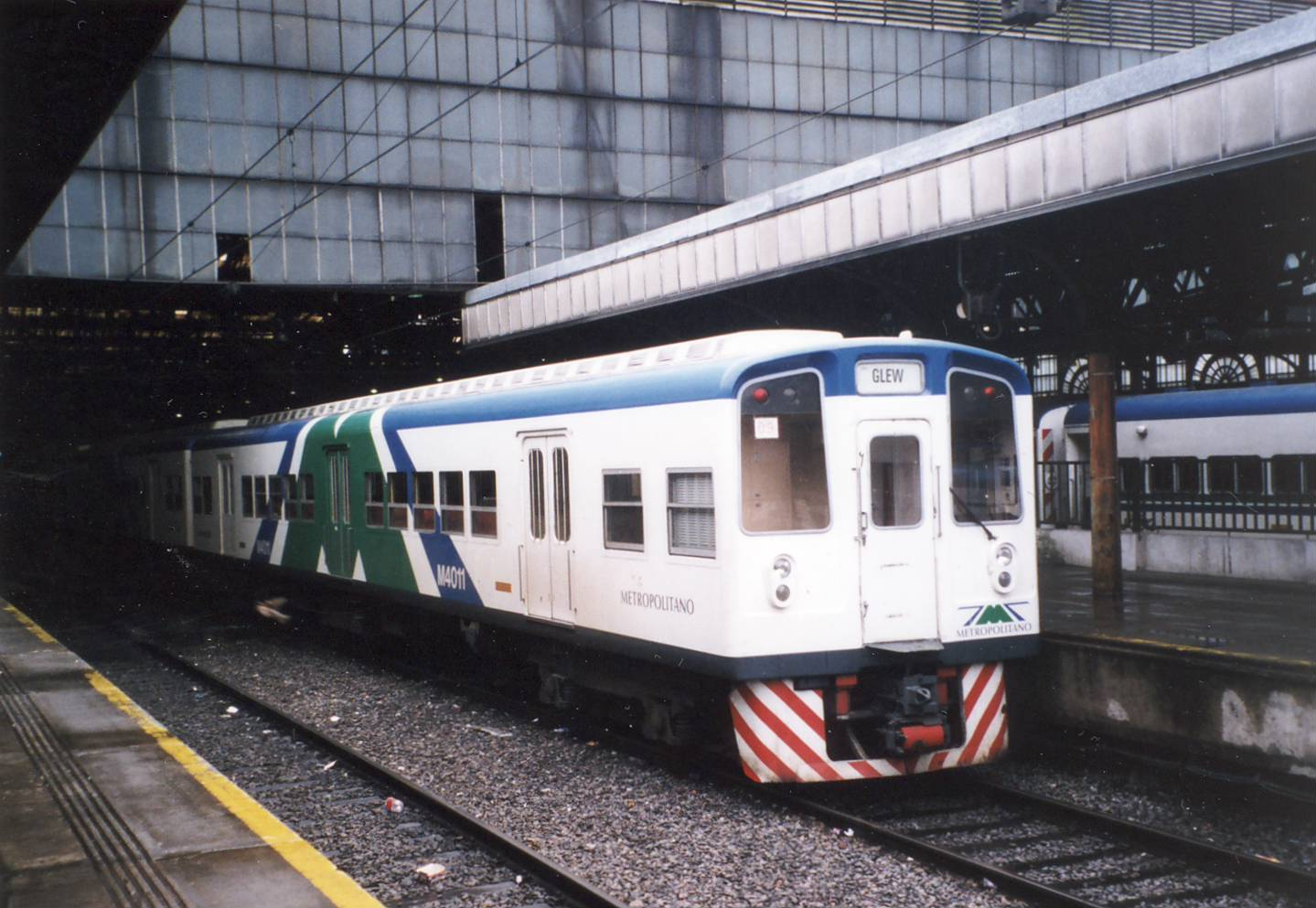
A 1983 Toshiba EMU in Metropolitano livery (2002)

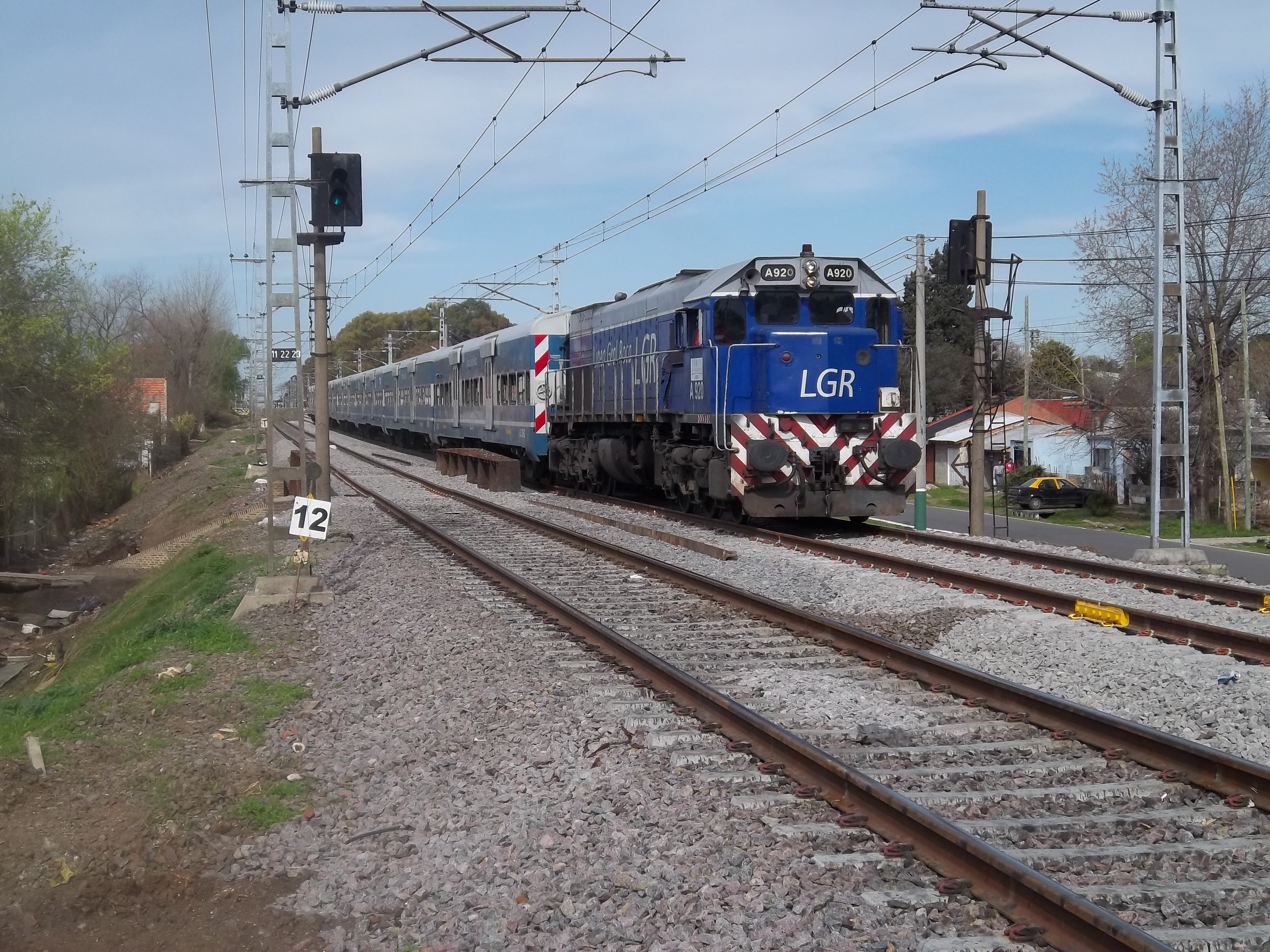
A train powered by an EMD GT22 Series locomotive near Claypole

This line had previously been run by the state-owned company Ferrocarriles Argentinos since nationalisation of the Argentine railways in 1948. Branches from Constitución to Ezeiza and Glew were electrified and the entire fleet of trains renewed, acquiring multiple units by Japanese companies Nippon Sharyo, Kinki Sharyo, Tokyu Car, Kawasaki and Hitachi. The electrified rail system was opened to public in November, 1985. The design of these Japanese-built cars was based upon the Odakyu 9000 series, built for the first time between 1972 and 1977.

Ferrocarriles Argentinos operated the trains until 1991 when residual company FEMESA temporarily took over all the urban services prior to the privatisation of the network. After the Government of Carlos Menem privatised the urban railways services, the private company Metropolitano (TMR) took over Roca Line through concession.

Nevertheless, non-compliance with the terms and conditions (such as lack of investment and poor maintenance of the line, in spite of the large government subsidies received by Metropolitano) led the Government of Argentina to revoke the contract of concession in 2007. The UGOFE consortium took over the service until 12 February 2014, when it was announced that the line would be granted to the local Emepa Group.

After the concession was revoked, a temporary consortium named "UGOFE", took over the Roca line.

Several projects were announced to modernize the line and improve its service, setting as a priority the electrification of the whole system. Other projects included a new maintenance yard in the town of Tolosa in La Plata Partido, several new bridges and tunnels at road crossings and improved grade crossings, all new concrete sleepers and welded rail joints for the entire line, the remodeling of 50 stations and the purchase of 200 electric coaches of the latest technology. Presently electrification of Avellaneda-Quilmes and Temperley-Bosques sections are under way.

=== Recent developments ===
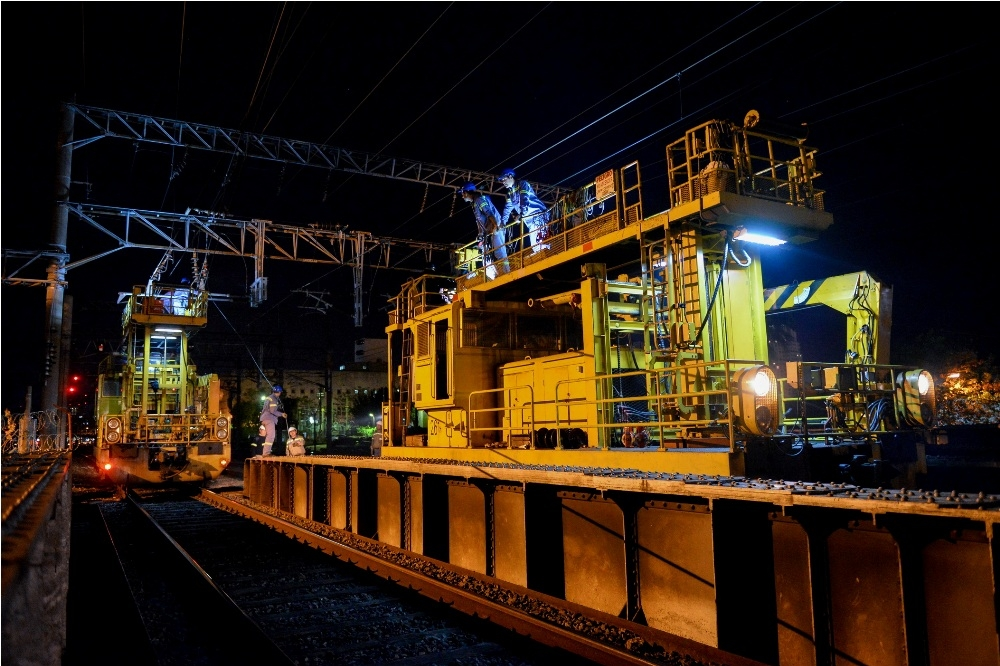
In recent years, there have been increased efforts to electrify the remaining parts of the line

In April 2013 the University train of La Plata service was opened, using railbuses built by the Argentine company TecnoTren. In that same year, Argentine state-owned company SOFSE announced that brand new electric multiple unit trains had been acquired for the line's metropolitan services. The contract included 300 coaches for the Roca Line, among the new rolling stock purchased for other lines.

The State-owned company Operadora Ferroviaria took over Roca Line (operated by Argentren) after the Government of Argentina rescinded the contracts signed with the company on 2 March 2015. The contract terms specified that the concession could be cancelled with no right to claim compensation. The agreements had been signed in February 2014, committing Argentren and Corredores Ferroviarios to operate the lines.

In March 2015, a total of 300 brand-new electric multiple units acquired to Chinese company CSR arrived in Argentina. The National Government announced that the new CSR EMUs would be put into service in June 2015, what finally happened on 8th of that month.

The line also reestablished services to Claypole (Constitución–Bosques–Gutiérrez branch) serving with the brand-new EMUs bought from China. The service had previously been suspended in February 2014.

There are currently ongoing electrification works on the line, most notably on the Buenos Aires - La Plata service which has received a US$500 million investment from the state, 300 of which come from an Inter-American Development Bank loan. Other works on the line include the refurbishment of stations and the raising of platforms to match the height of the new CSR rolling stock, while the construction of new underpasses and other infrastructure improvements is due to reduce travel times by around 50%.

On 5 December 2015, the electrified service between Constitución and Quilmes was presented, although the service was only opened next year, after the presidential elections, on 13 February. On 13 June 2016, the Quilmes-Berazategui section began service.

In March 2017, the first section of the electrified service was opened, joining Constitución with City Bell, covering almost 45 km-length. The entire project includes to extend the electrified service to La Plata station. The extension to La Plata was opened on 18 October 2017, about two years late due to numerous delays in construction.

In January 2018, Argentinian Minister of Transport Guillermo Dietrich approved an order of 200 EMU cars from CRRC Qingdao Sifang for service on the Roca Line, where they were to replace Toshiba EMUs that were built in the 1980s. In 2021 transport minister Alexis Guerrera decided not to renew the freight concession with freight operation transferred to Argentinean Trains Cargo.

=== Historic operators ===
Companies that have operated the Roca Line since it was established after the 1948 nationalisation are:

Operator	Period
Ferrocarriles Argentinos	1948–1991
FEMESA	1991–1995
Metropolitano	1995–2007
UGOFE	2007–2014
Argentren	2014–2015
Trenes Argentinos	2015–pres.

== Services ==
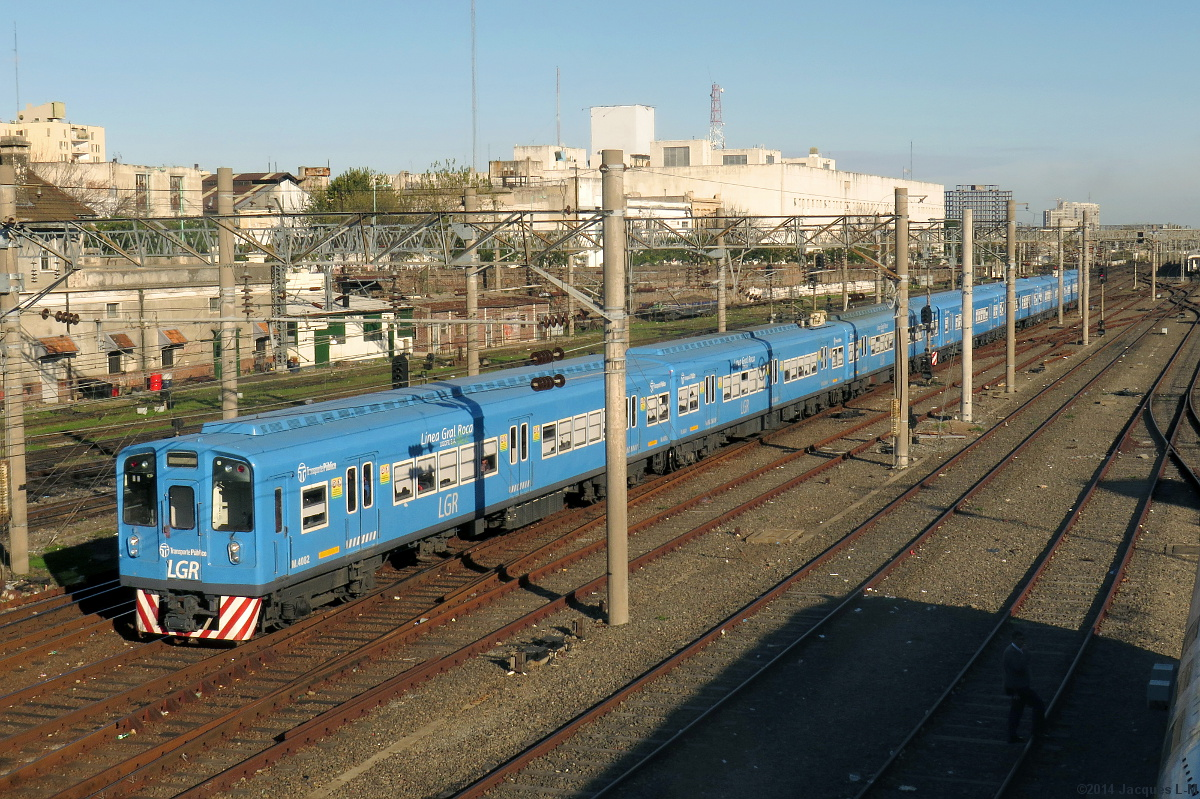
A Japanese EMU in Trenes Argentinos livery

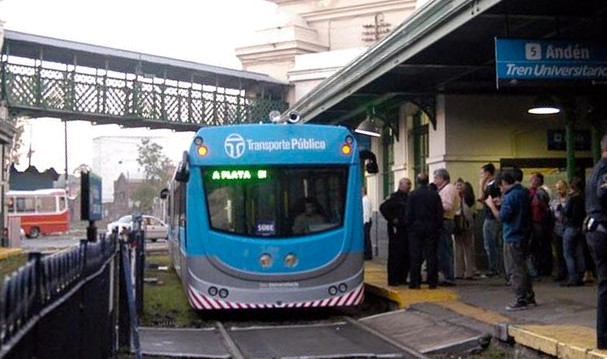
University train of La Plata

Start	End	Type	Dist/Km.
Plaza Constitución	La Plata	Electric	52
Plaza Constitución	Ezeiza	Electric	32
Plaza Constitución	Alejandro Korn	Electric	39
Plaza Constitución	Bosques (via Temperley)	Electric	33
Plaza Constitución	Bosques (via Quilmes)	Electric	32
Temperley	Haedo	Diesel	30
Bosques	Gutiérrez	Diesel	7
Ezeiza	Cañuelas	Diesel	35
Alejandro Korn	Chascomús	Diesel	93
Cañuelas	Monte	Diesel	42
Cañuelas	Lobos	Diesel	37
La Plata	Hospital San Juan de Dios (Note: University train)	Diesel	4

== Gallery ==
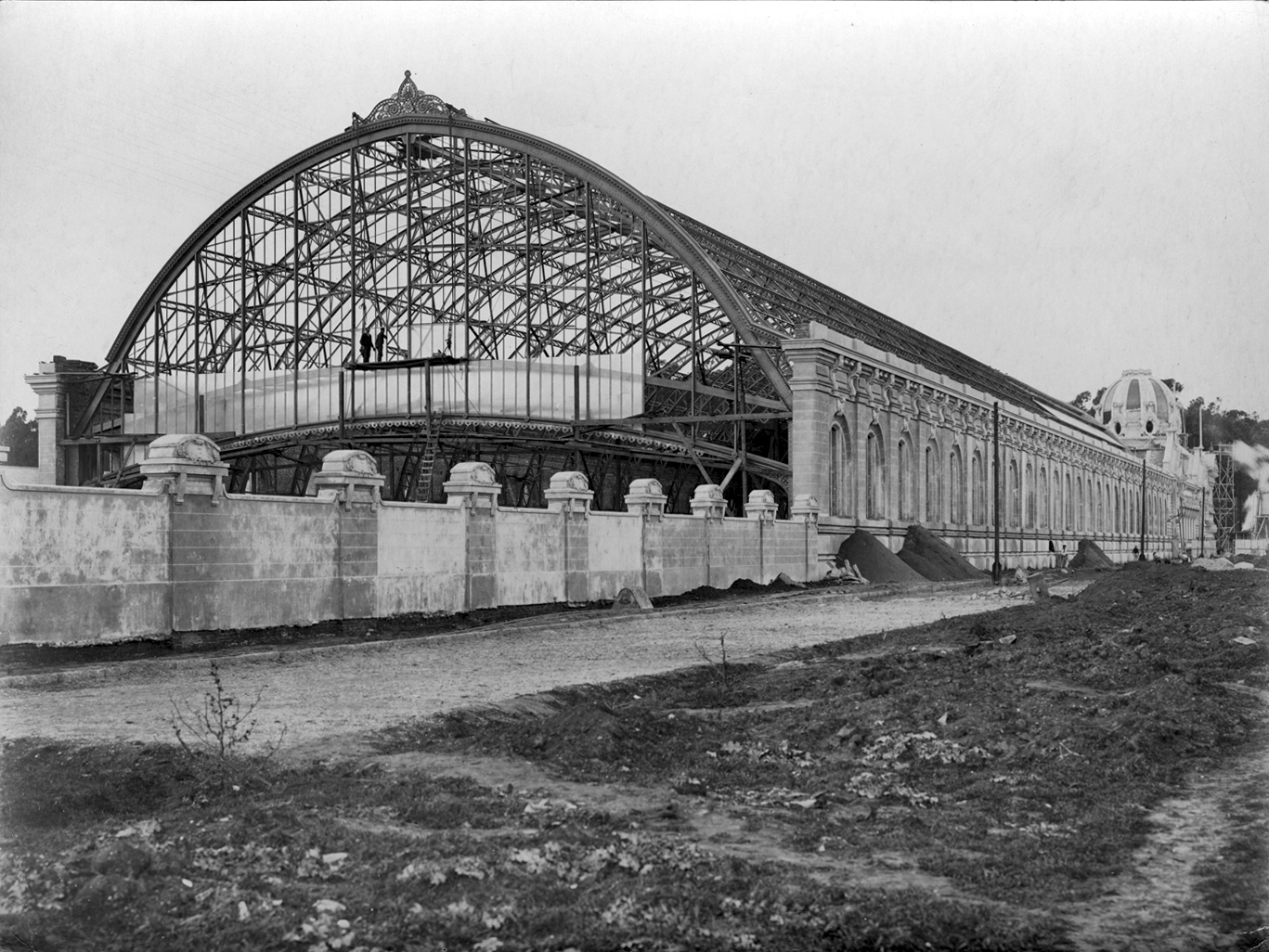
La Plata railway station under construction (1902)

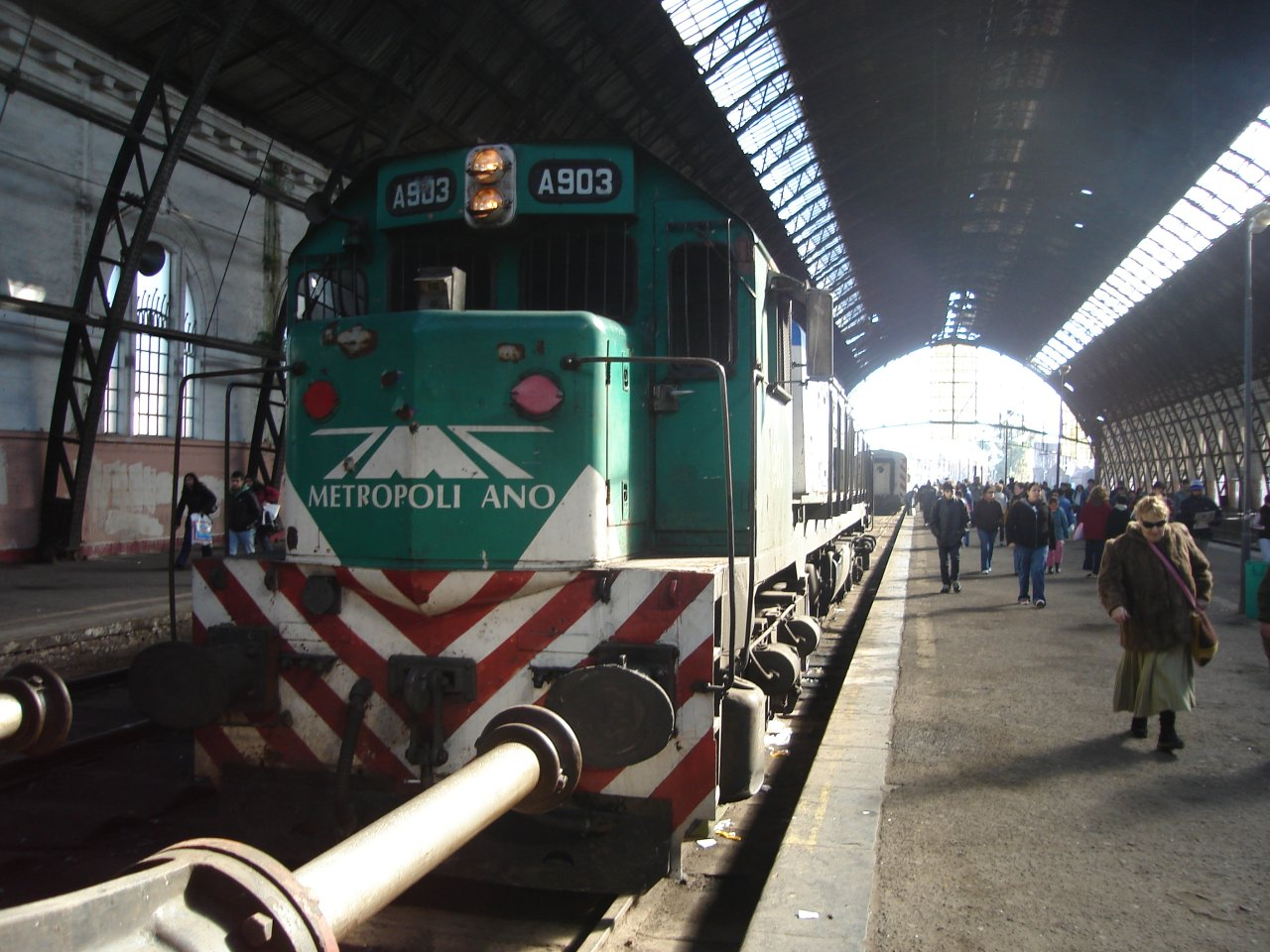
Metropolitano locomotive at La Plata

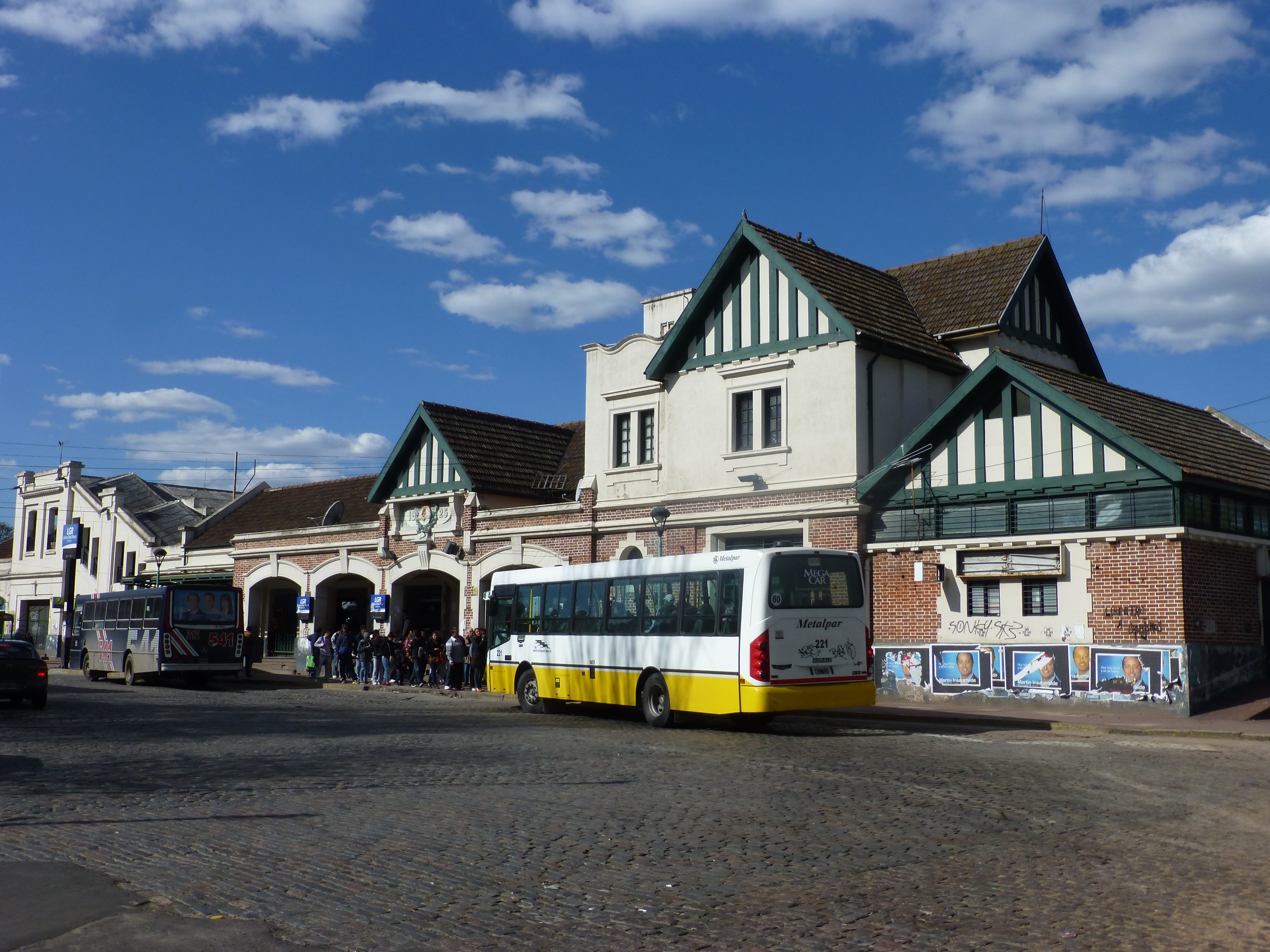
Banfield station

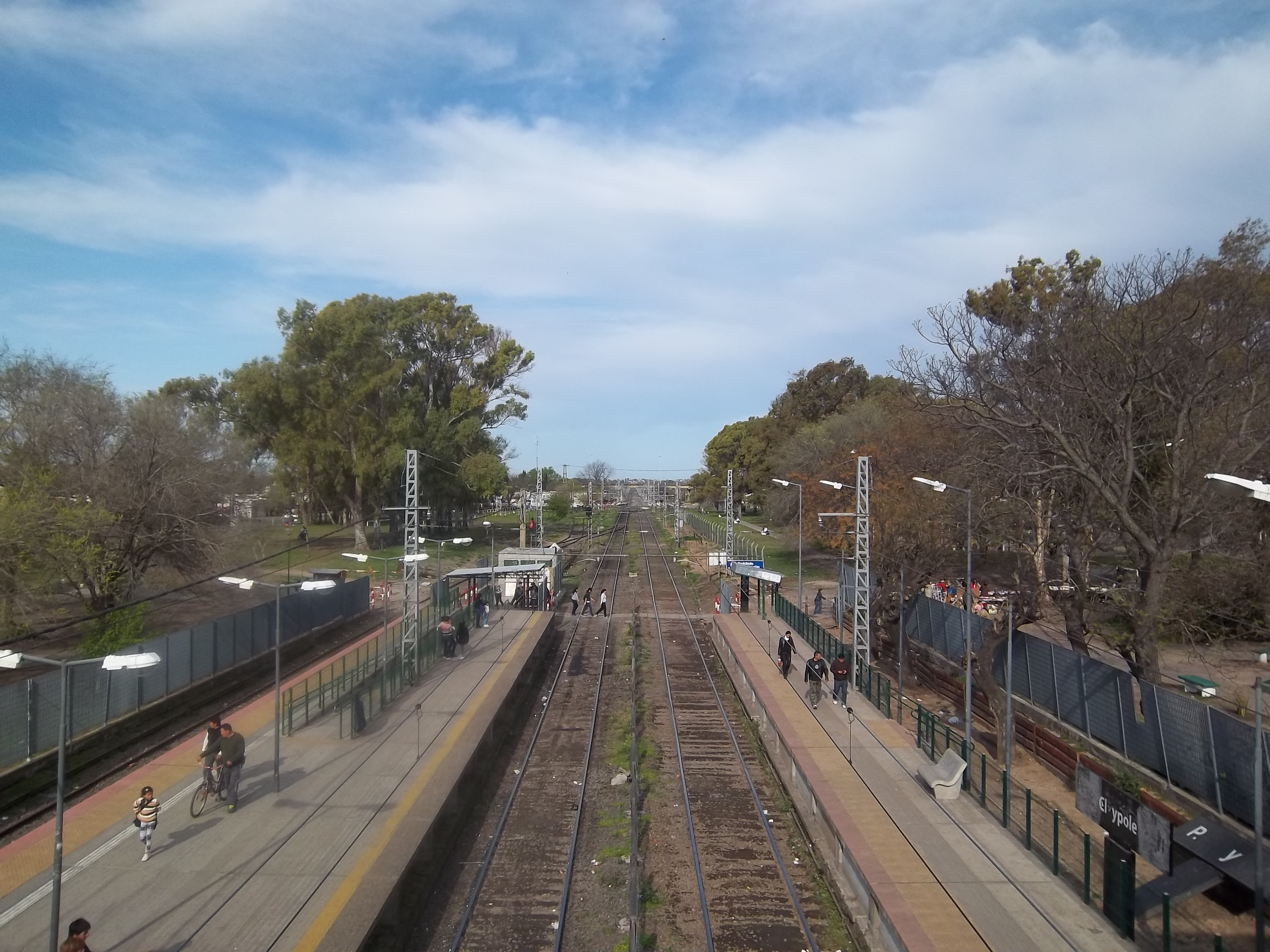
Claypole station, platforms

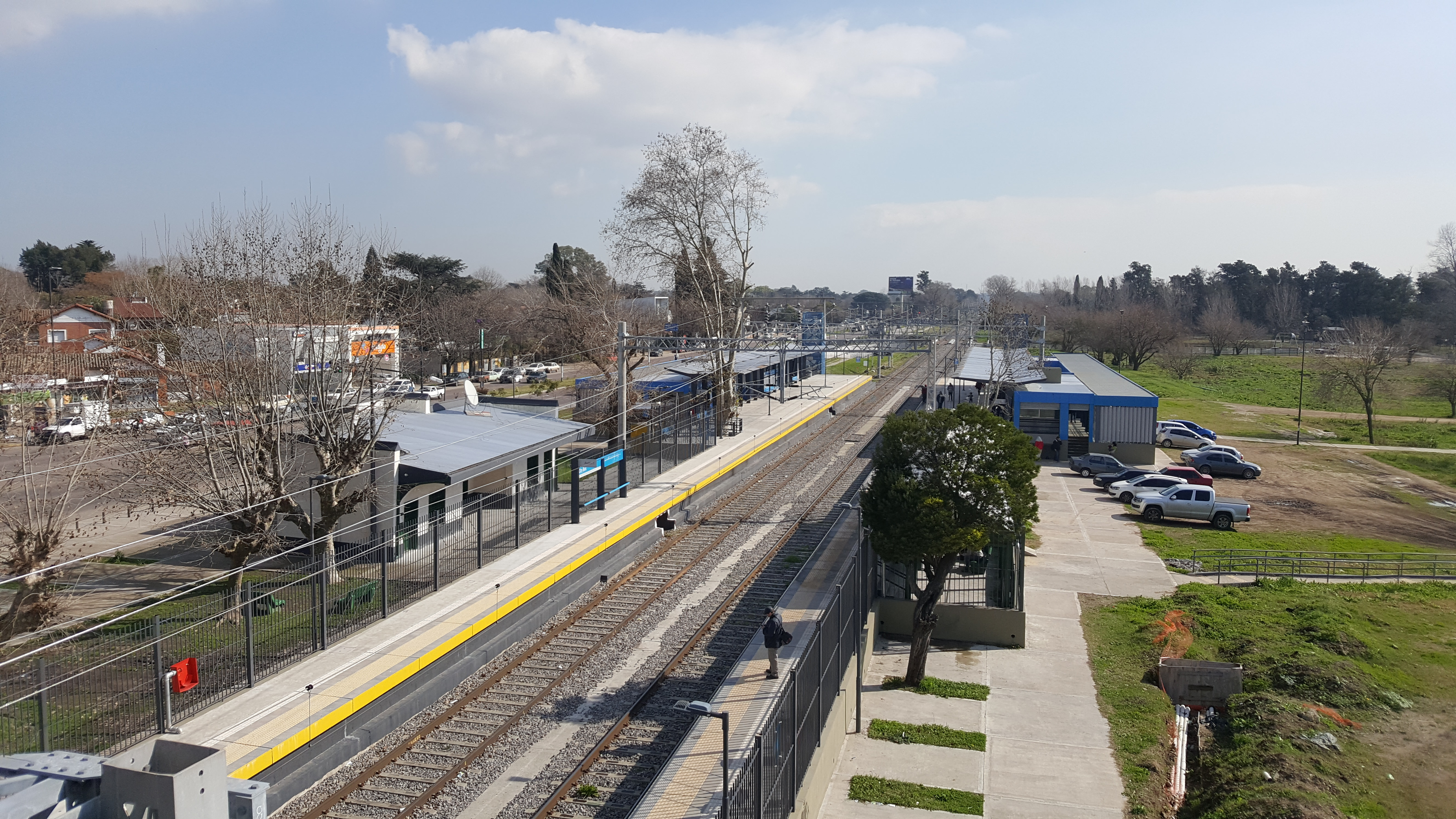
City Bell station, post-renovation

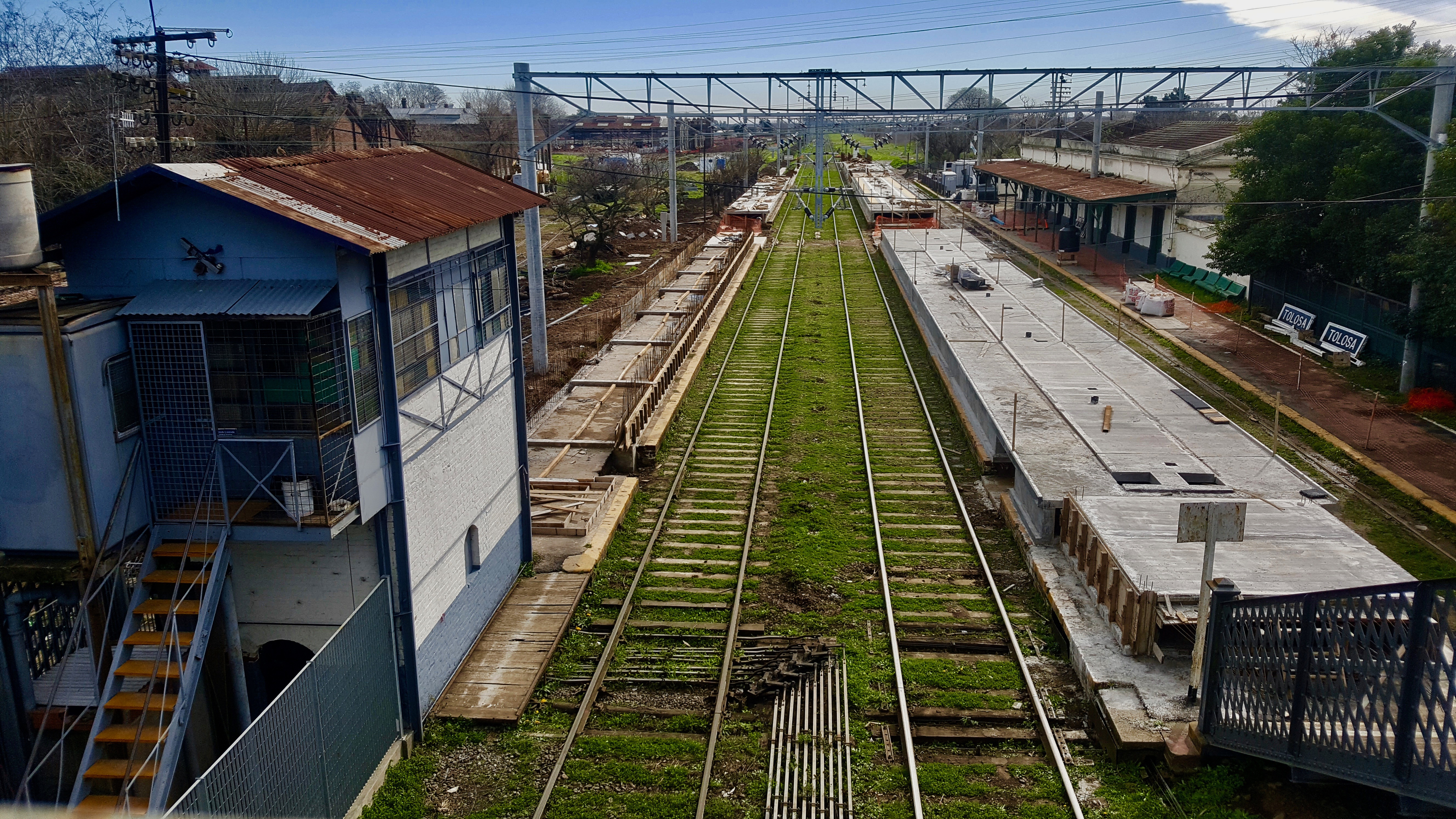
Tolosa station, under renovation
