= Juan Pacchini =

Argentine professional footballer

Personal information
- Full name: Juan Ignacio Pacchini
- Date of birth: 17 June 2000 (age 26)
- Place of birth: Rafael Calzada, Argentina
- Height: 1.66 m (5 ft 5 in)
- Position: Midfielder

Team information
- Current team: Camioneros

Youth career
- 9 de Julio Adrogué
- Brown
- 2013–2020: Independiente

Senior career*
Years	Team	Apps	(Gls)
2020–2022	Independiente	11	(0)
2023	Brown (Adrogué)	7	(0)
2024–	Camioneros	13	(0)
- * Club domestic league appearances and goals as of 8 September 2024

Juan Ignacio Pacchini (born 17 June 2000) is an Argentine professional footballer who plays as a midfielder for Camioneros.

== Career ==
Born in Rafael Calzada, Pacchini started his career with local teams; including 9 de Julio Adrogué. He soon joined Brown, before departing in 2013 to head to Independiente. After seven years passing through their youth system, Pacchini made his breakthrough into first-team football towards the back end of 2020. After being an unused substitute for a Copa Sudamericana victory over Atlético Tucumán on 29 October, the central midfielder made his senior debut days later in a Copa de la Liga Profesional win away to Central Córdoba on 1 November.

== Career statistics ==
As of 5 November 2020.

Appearances and goals by club, season and competition
Club	Season	League			Cup		League Cup		Continental		Other		Total	
Club	Season	Division	Apps	Goals	Apps	Goals	Apps	Goals	Apps	Goals	Apps	Goals	Apps	Goals
Independiente	2020–21 (Note: Soccerway counts Copa de la Liga Profesional appearances as league appearances.)	Primera División	1	0	0	0	0	0	0	0	0	0	1	0
Career total			1	0	0	0	0	0	0	0	0	0	1	0
