= Kevin Cardozo =

Argentine footballer (born 1998)

Personal information
- Full name: Kevin Cardozo
- Date of birth: 20 February 1998 (age 28)
- Place of birth: Longchamps, Argentina
- Position: Midfielder

Team information
- Current team: Fénix

Youth career
- Brown
- Lanús

Senior career*
| Years | Team | Apps | (Gls) |
| | Lanús | 1 | (0) |
| 2018 | → Olimpo (loan) | 0 | (0) |
| 2019– | Fénix | 4 | (0) |
- * Club domestic league appearances and goals as of 16:36, 23 December 2019 (UTC)

Kevin Cardozo (born 20 February 1998) is an Argentine professional footballer who plays as a midfielder for Club Atlético Fénix.

== Career ==
Cardozo's senior career got underway with Lanús, having joined from Brown. He was promoted to their senior team during the 2017–18 Argentine Primera División season, initially appearing as an unused substitute for three fixtures between October 2017 and April 2018. On 28 April, Cardozo made his professional football bow during a goalless tie at home to Argentinos Juniors; he was subbed on for Gastón Lodico with sixteen minutes left. Three months later, in July, Primera B Nacional club Olimpo loaned Cardozo. However, he terminated his loan in the following August.

== Career statistics ==
As of 16 October 2018.

Club statistics
| Club | Season | League | | | Cup (Note: Includes the Copa Argentina) | | League Cup | | Continental (Note: Includes the Copa Libertadores and Copa Sudamericana) | | Other | | Total | |
| Club | Season | Division | Apps | Goals | Apps | Goals | Apps | Goals | Apps | Goals | Apps | Goals | Apps | Goals |
|---|---|---|---|---|---|---|---|---|---|---|---|---|---|---|
| Lanús | 2017–18 | Primera División | 1 | 0 | 0 | 0 | — | | 0 | 0 | 0 | 0 | 1 | 0 |
| Lanús | 2018–19 | Primera División | 0 | 0 | 0 | 0 | — | | 0 | 0 | 0 | 0 | 0 | 0 |
| Lanús | Total | | 1 | 0 | 0 | 0 | — | | 0 | 0 | 0 | 0 | 1 | 0 |
| Olimpo (loan) | 2018–19 | Primera B Nacional | 0 | 0 | 0 | 0 | — | | — | | 0 | 0 | 0 | 0 |
| Career total | | | 1 | 0 | 0 | 0 | — | | 0 | 0 | 0 | 0 | 1 | 0 |
