= CSR EMU (Argentina) =

CSR Corporation EMU cars for Buenos Aires' commuter railways

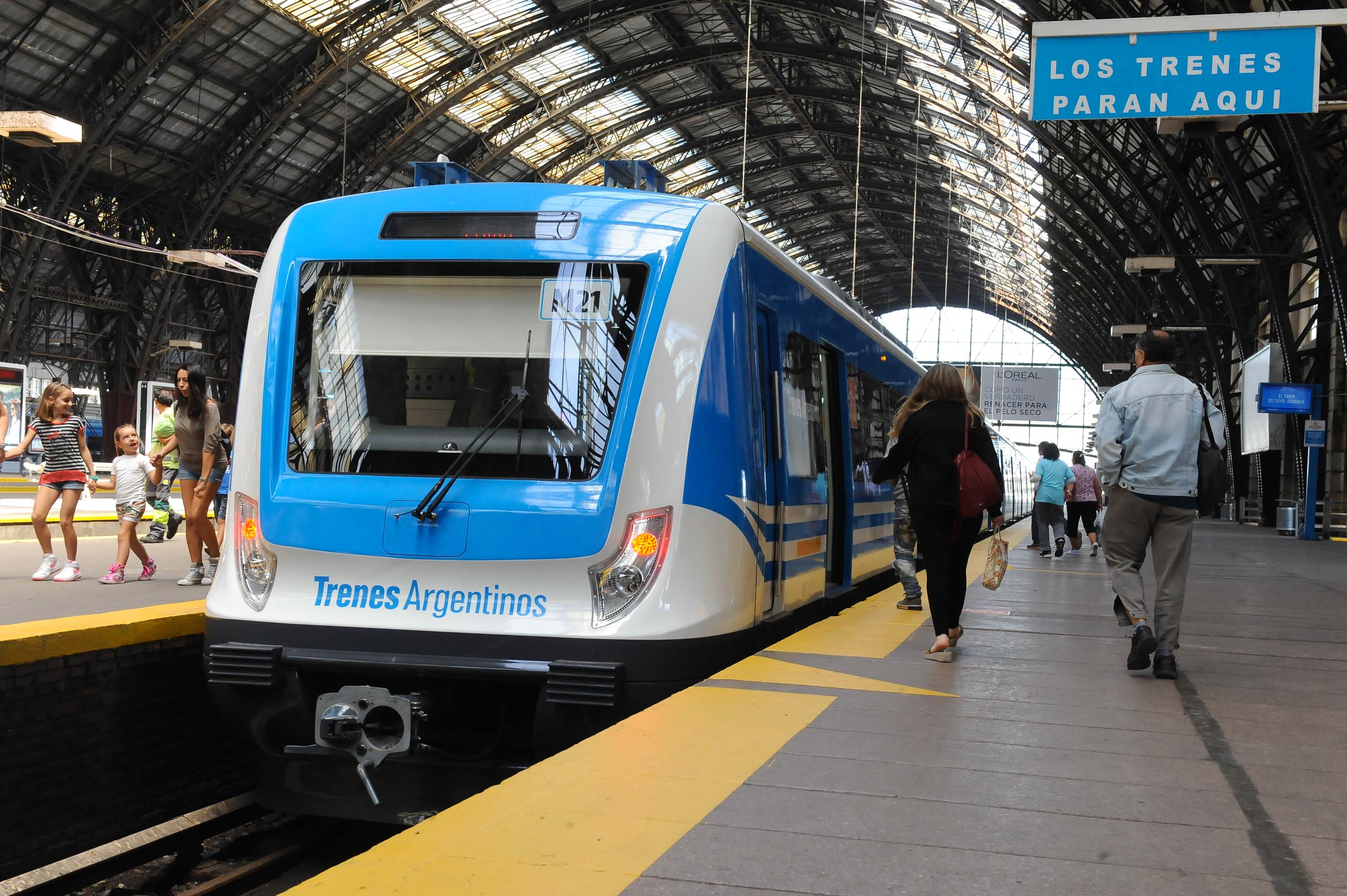
- A CSR EMU at Retiro Mitre railway station

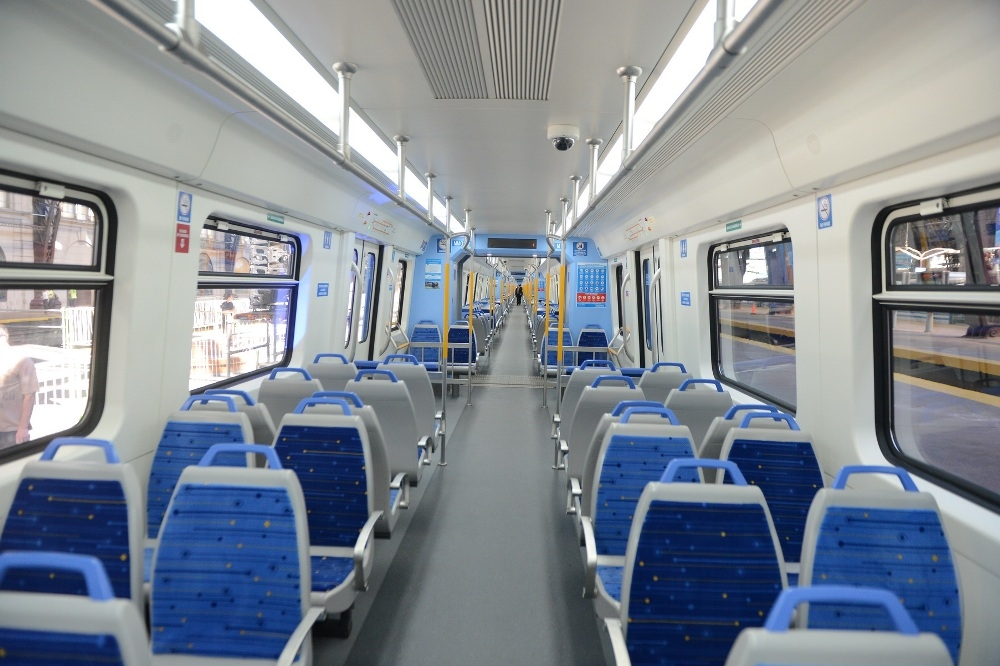
- CSR Mitre Interior
- Stock type: Electric multiple unit
- Manufacturer: CSR Corporation Limited
- Built at: CSR Sifang Co Ltd.
- Constructed: 2013-2016
- Entered service: 2014
- Number under construction: 405 cars (third rail); 500 cars (overhead line)
- Formation: 6 cars per trainset (Mitre Line); 9 cars per trainset (Sarmiento Line); 7 cars per trainset (Roca Line)
- Capacity: 60 seats (control car); 72 seats (passenger car)
- Operator: Trenes Argentinos
- Lines served: Mitre Line, Roca Line and Sarmiento Line

Specifications
- Car length: 22.67 m (74 ft 4 1/2 in)(control car); 21.8 m (71 ft 6 1/4 in)(passenger car)
- Width: 3.10 m (10 ft 2 in)
- Height: 3.79 m (12 ft 5 1/4 in)
- Doors: 3 per side
- Maximum speed: 120 km/h (75 mph)
- Traction system: IGBT–VVVF inverter Mitsubishi Electric MAP-194-75VD259 (Mitre and Sarmiento lines); Zhuzhou CRRC Times Electric t Power-TI4 (Roca Line)
- Traction motors: Mitre and Sarmiento lines: Mitsubishi Electric MB-5152-A; Roca Line: CRRC Zhuzhou Electric (中车株洲电机) YQ-250-2
- Power output: Mitre and Sarmiento lines: 190 kW (255 hp) per motor Roca Line: 250 kW (335 hp) per motor
- Power supply: 800 V DC Third rail (Mitre and Sarmiento lines); 25 kV AC, 50 Hz Overhead line (Roca Line)
- Track gauge: 1,676 mm (5 ft 6 in)

The CSR EMU is a series of electric multiple unit cars manufactured by CSR Corporation Limited for use on Buenos Aires' commuter rail network. As of 2015, the trains operated on three of the city's lines and 705 cars were manufactured, with each line using a different number of cars per train. They were created for use on lines electrified using both third rail and overhead lines.

== Background ==
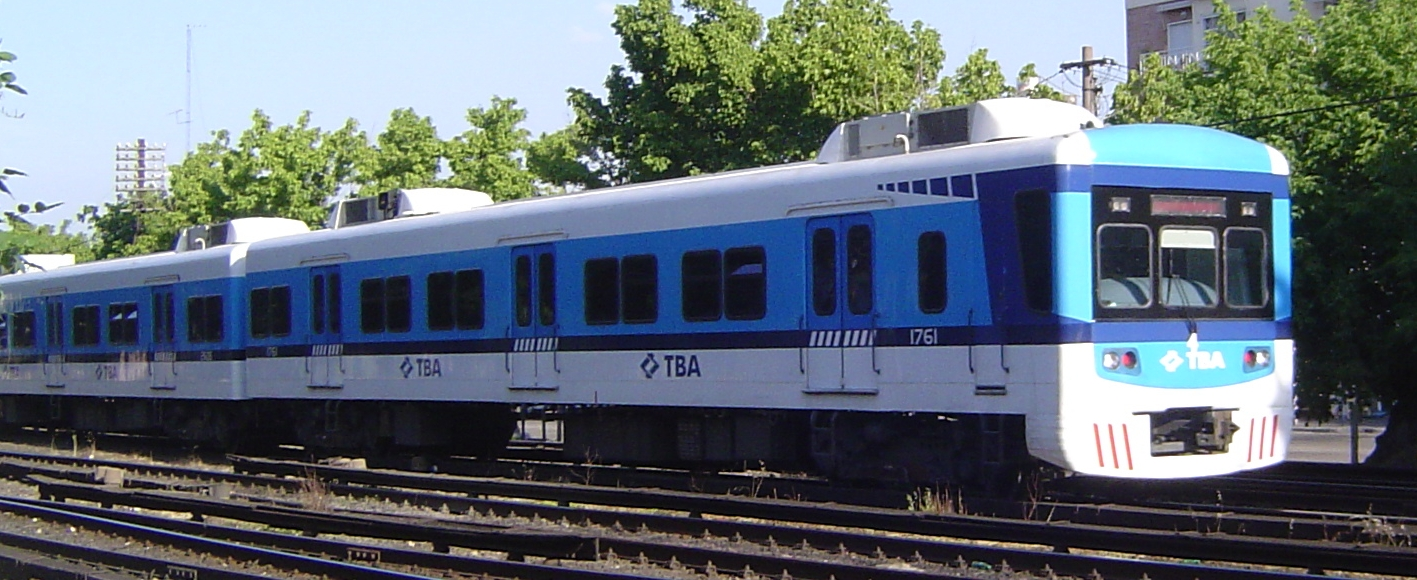
A Toshiba EMU on the Sarmiento Line before the purchase of the CSR trains.

By 2013, the rolling stock of Buenos Aires' commuter rail network was ageing and deteriorating rapidly. At the same time, high-profile accidents in Flores and Once in previous years had led the national government to revise the concession-based railway privatisation, which was largely blamed for the deterioration of the network. The government thus decided to intervene, revoking concessions to companies such as Trenes de Buenos Aires and setting up Trenes Argentinos to manage the lines.

This was followed by a series of rolling stock purchases from China CNR Corporation and CSR Corporation Limited (and later some Argentine companies) to replace trains on both the diesel and electrified segments. For the electrified lines, CSR won the contract to provide the electric multiple units, and an order was placed in January 2013 for 405 cars for the Mitre and Sarmiento lines, with another order for 300 cars for the Roca Line signed in August 2013.

The acquisition of the CSR rolling stock was also accompanied by a series of works on all three lines, to accommodate the new trains (e.g. the electrification of the Buenos Aires - La Plata segment on the Roca Line), and to generally improve rail services. On top of the emergency improvements undertaken following the Once Tragedy, some of these improvements included the modernisation of stations, raising the height of platforms to match the new trains, incorporating train protection systems, creating new underpasses and rail infrastructure improvements, some of which were also undertaken by the City of Buenos Aires. However, not all works were finished by the time the CSR EMUs arrived on their respective lines, and some works continued on while they were already running services.

A further 200 cars were purchased for the Roca Line in 2017 to replace the aging Toshiba EMUs which had exceeded their 30-year lifespan.

== Overview ==
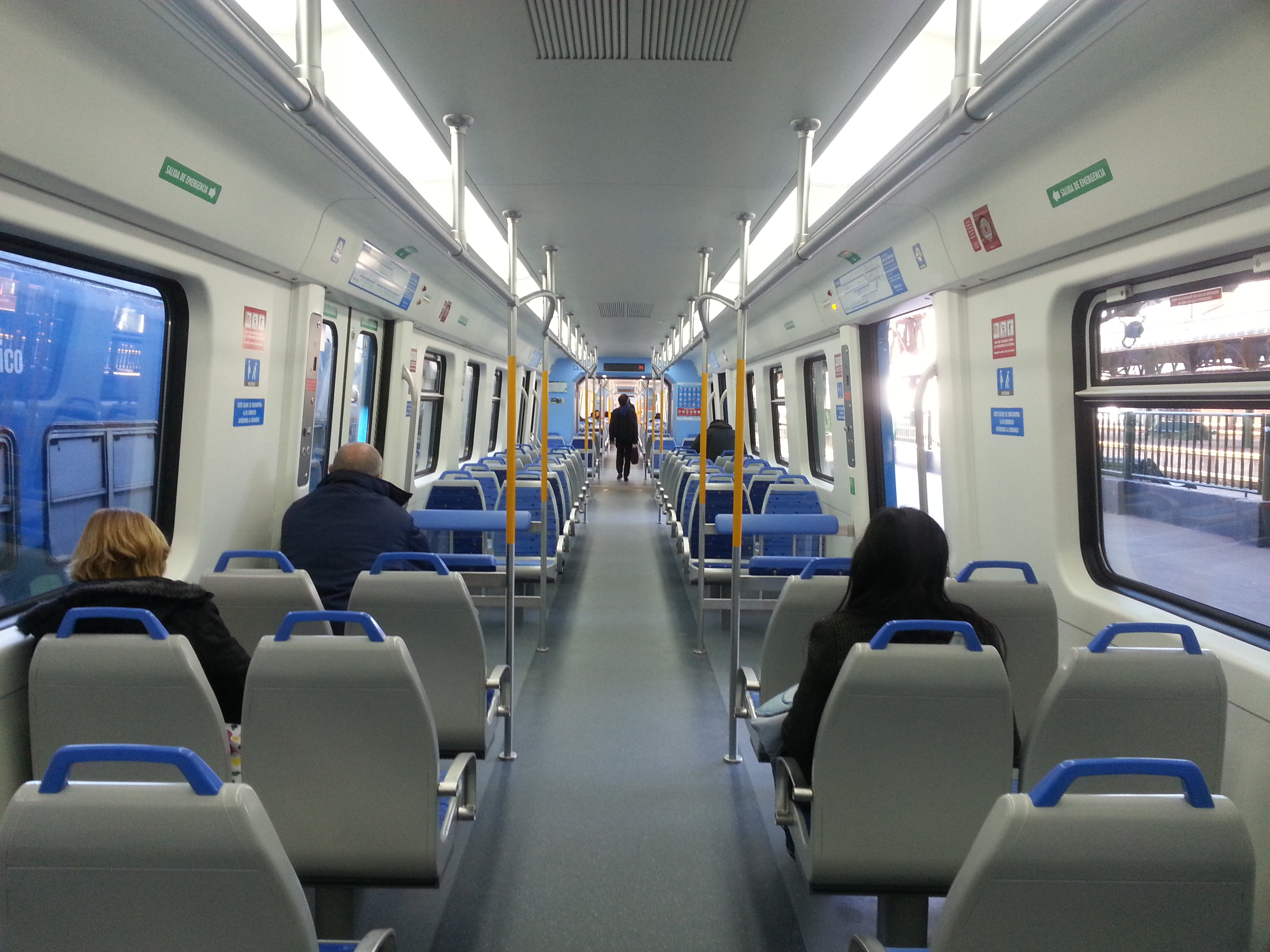
Passengers aboard a Roca Line train.

The units were built at CSR's Qingdao factory, a large complex with 1,640,000 m^{2} (17,652,813 sq ft) of covered space. The total cost for the 709 cars was $841 million, which also included R&D as well as shipping, or $1.09 million to $1.27 million per car depending on the line, which was noted as being significantly below market prices. In 2014, CSR then purchased the Argentine rolling stock manufacturer Emprendimientos Ferroviarios, in part to establish a place in Argentina to maintain the trains once they were in operation.

The trains have a series of features in line with modern rolling stock, such as ABS, air conditioning, CCTV, a train protection system and intelligent doors, while numerous components such as the brakes and traction system were sourced from countries such as Germany, Sweden and Japan. The Roca Line trains have some differences: overhead collection at 25 000 V (instead of 800 V third rail), more (but smaller) windows per car, and no CCTV cameras. The trains began to arrive in February 2014, just 13 months after the order was signed.

== Usage ==
A Mitre Line train at Rivadavia station.

The electric multiple units are used on all of Buenos Aires' electrified commuter rail lines, with the exception of the Urquiza Line which uses Japanese Toshiba EMUs. The Belgrano Sur line had diesel multiple units with a similar appearance to the CSR electric multiple units, which arrived in the country from 2015. The San Martín Line also saw new rolling stock from CSR, but in the form of CSR SDD7 diesel-electric locomotives, while the Belgrano Norte line has seen the incorporation of Argentine-built EMEPA DMUs.

The Sarmiento Line was the first to begin operating the CSR trains in July 2014, followed by the Mitre Line and then the Roca Line. In the case of the Mitre and Sarmiento lines, the CSR EMUs make up the entirety of the electric rolling stock, while diesel segments such as the Victoria - Capilla del Señor route on the Mitre Line use Argentine-built Materfer CMM 400-2 DMUs. The first Roca Line trains began arriving in 2015, continuing to arrive throughout the year, and began to be integrated in June 2015. These are running alongside the existing Toshiba rolling stock purchased in 1985.

All the trains are operated by the state-owned Trenes Argentinos, which is now a part of the larger Ferrocarriles Argentinos umbrella company.

== Gallery ==
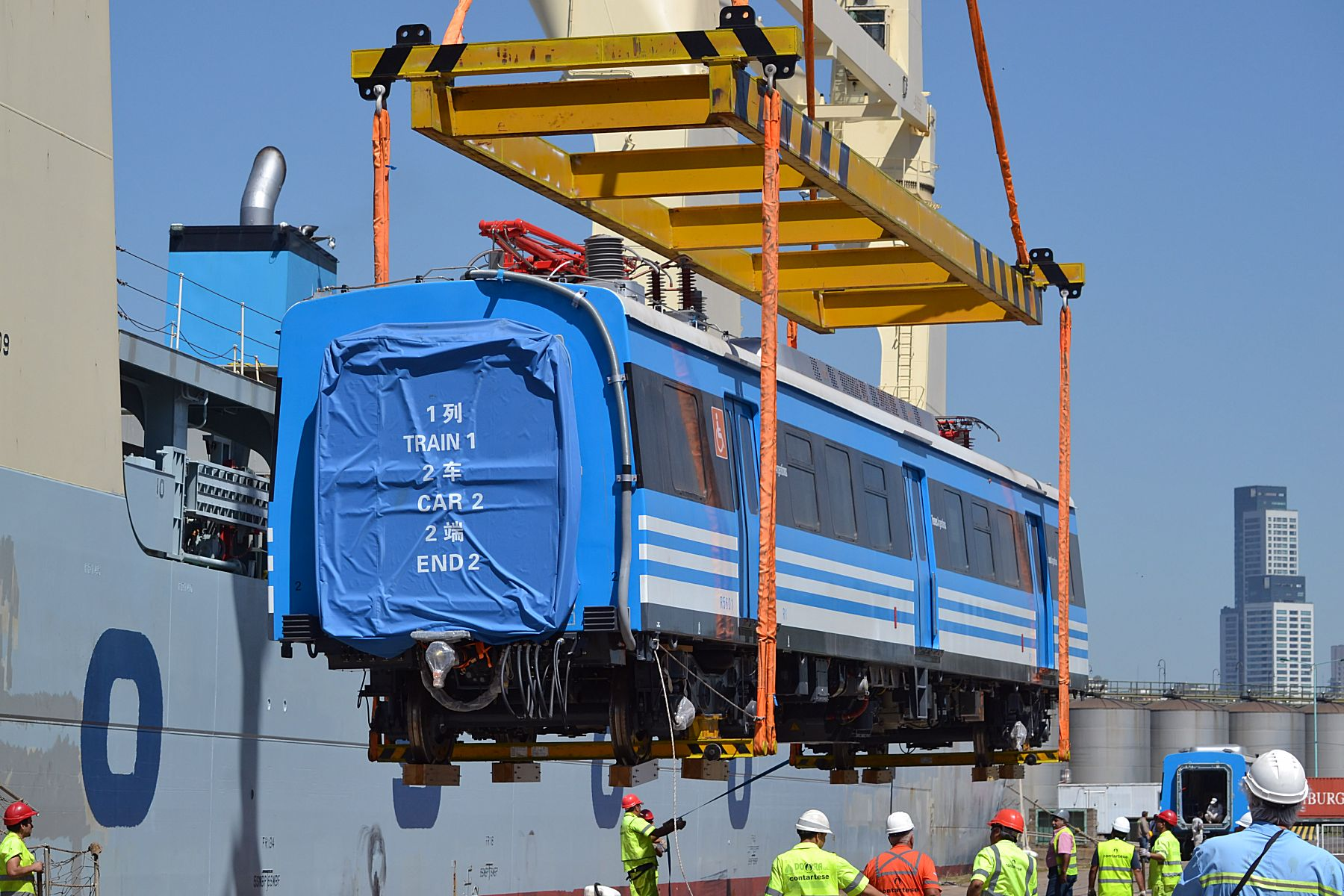
Roca Line cars being unloaded at the Port of Buenos Aires

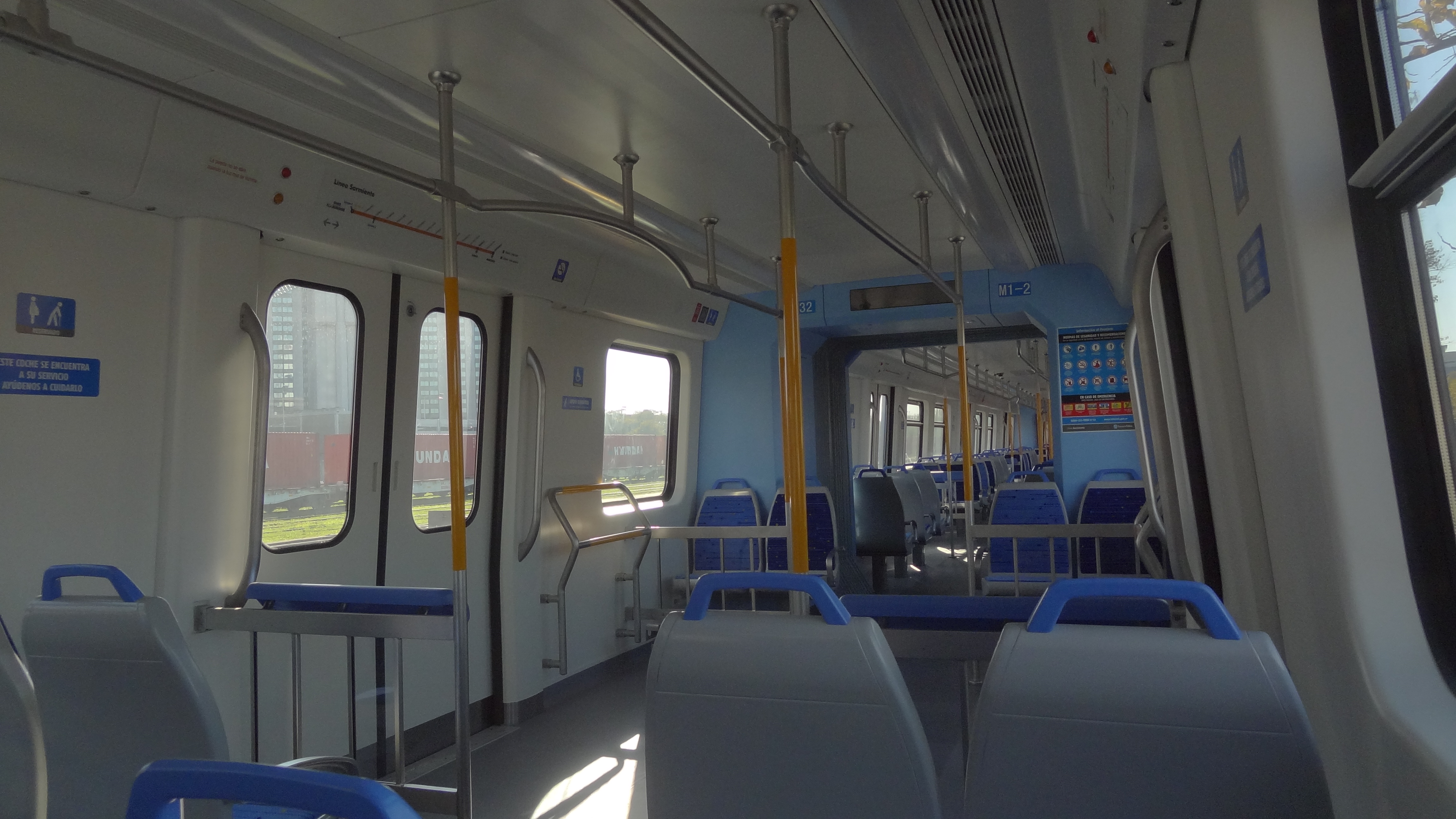
Interior of a Sarmiento Line train

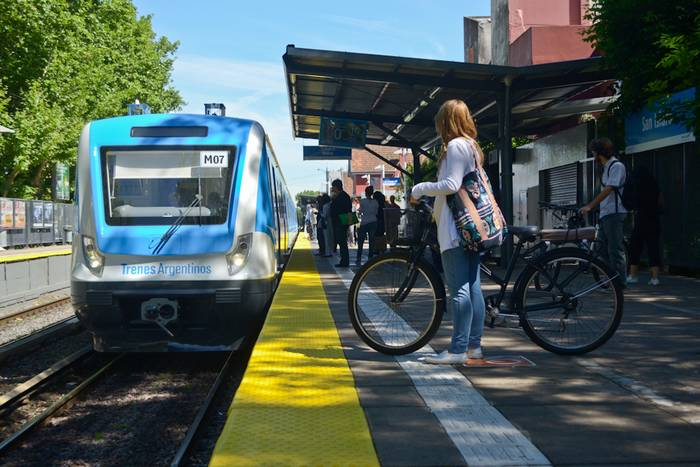
A Mitre Line train at San Isidro station

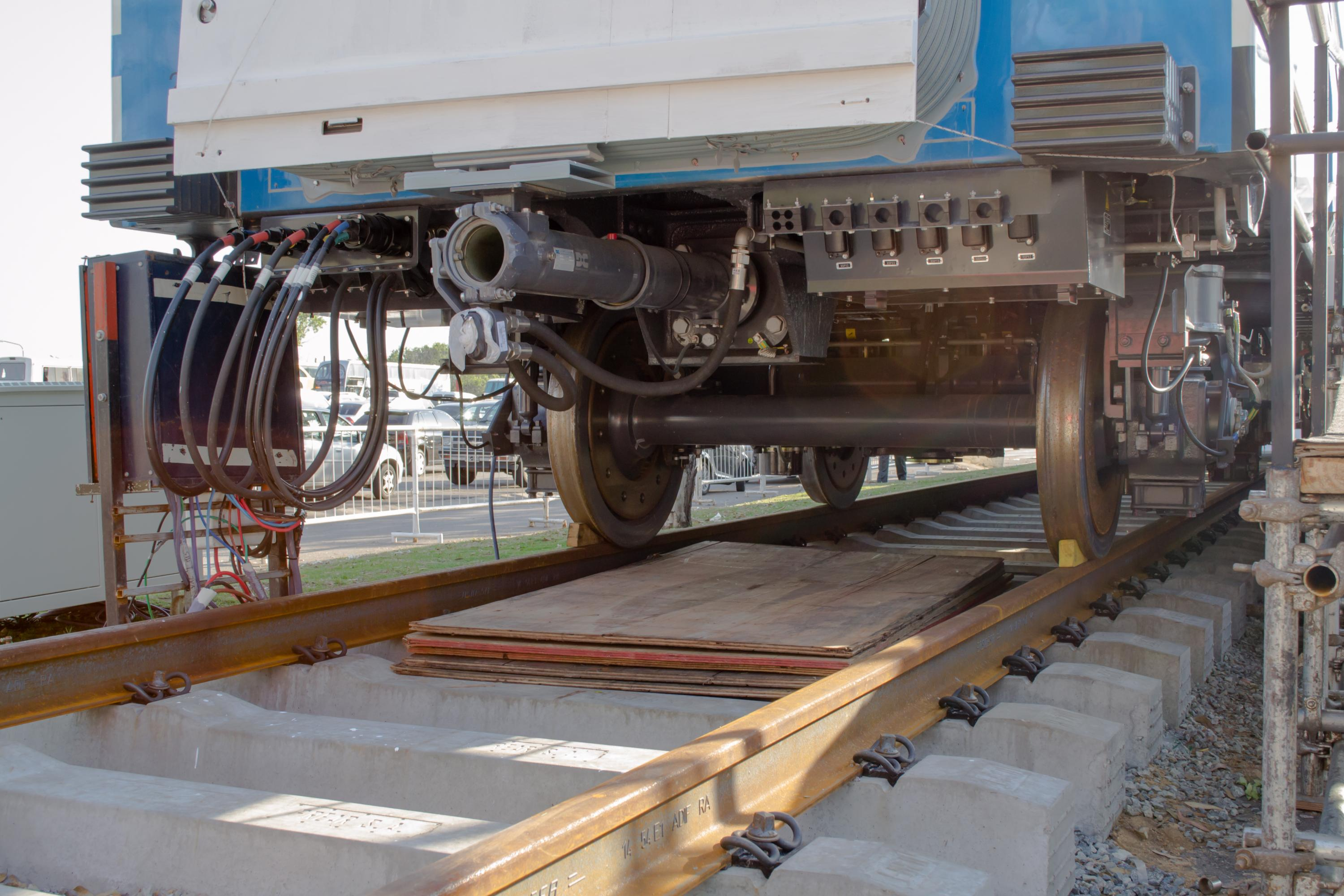
Close-up of a coupler

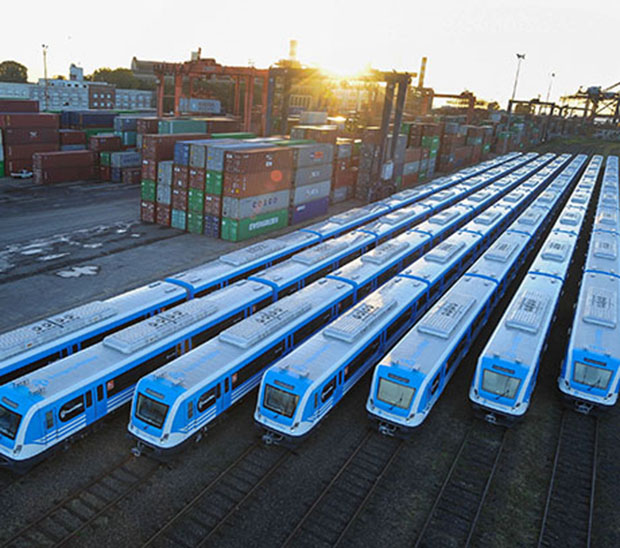
Sarmiento Line trains

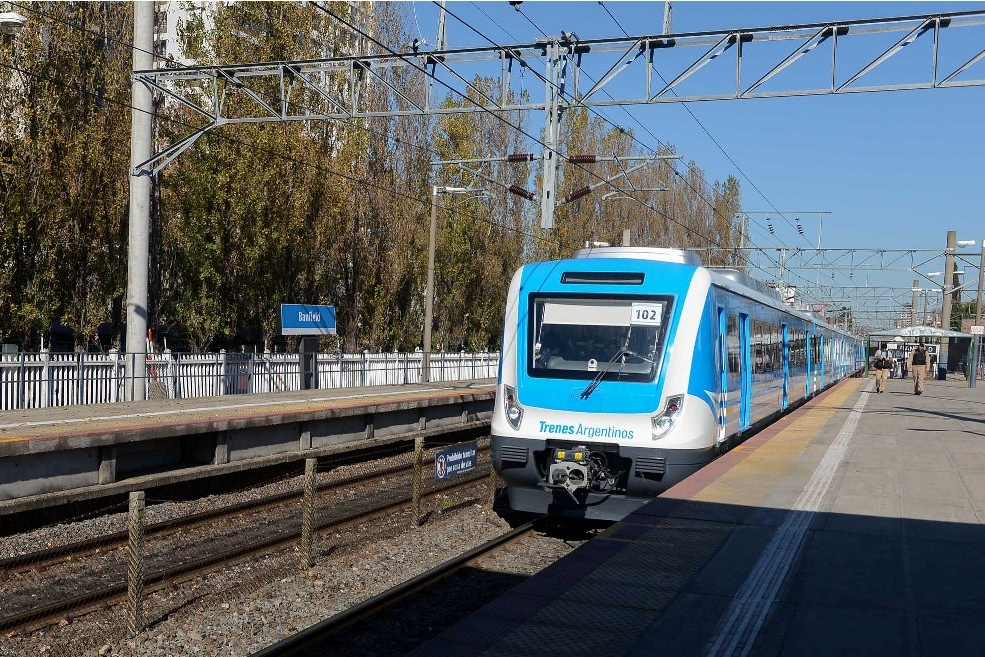
Roca Line train in Banfield

== See also ==
- CSR SDD7 - Locomotive manufactured by the same company for the San Martin Line
- CNR CKD8 - Other Chinese rolling stock in Argentina
- CITIC-CNR - Chinese underground cars for the Buenos Aires Underground
- Rail transport in Argentina
