= Club Atlético Claypole =

Argentine association football club

Claypole
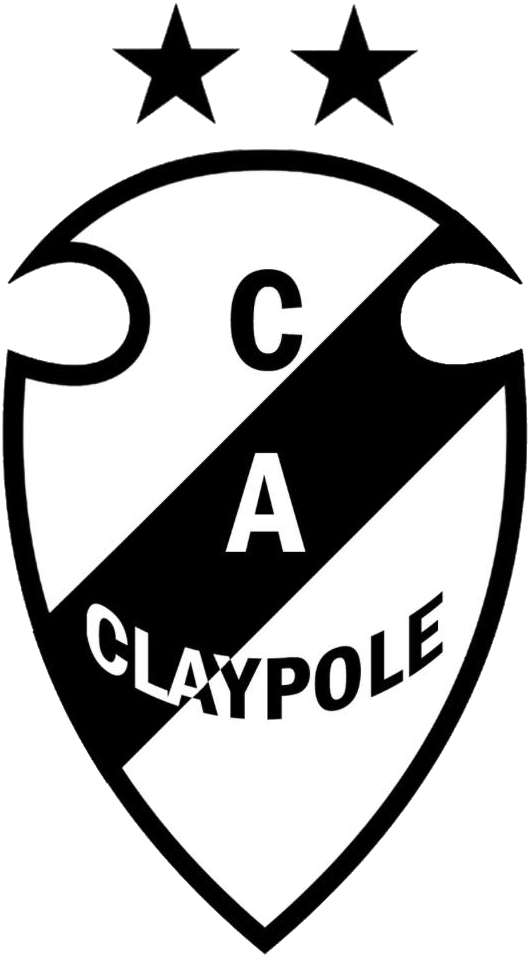
- Full name: Club Atlético Claypole
- Nickname: Tambero
- Founded: 1 October 1923; 102 years ago
- Ground: Rodolfo Capocasa, Claypole, Argentina
- Capacity: 1,300
- Chairman: Santiago Bustos Fernández
- Manager: Héctor Bailié
- League: Primera C
- 2024: 8th.
| Home colours | Away colours |

Club Atlético Claypole is an Argentine football club located in Claypole, Buenos Aires. The team currently plays in Primera D, the 5th level of the Argentine football league system.

== History ==
The club was founded on October 1, 1923. It is claimed that kit uniform was inspired by English side Sunderland even though Sunderland have worn a red and white kit since 1887. Claypole gained the affiliation to Argentine Football Association in 1978 and obtained its first title in 1997.

Claypole and Victoriano Arenas played a match in 2011 where all 22 players on the pitch and a combination of 14 subs and coaches received red cards, for a total of 36. This is the most red cards ever issued in a senior level game.

== Players ==
Note: Flags indicate national team as defined under FIFA eligibility rules; some limited exceptions apply. Players may hold more than one non-FIFA nationality.

| No. | Pos. | Nation | Player |
|---|---|---|---|
| 1 | GK | ARG | Lucas Cravero |
| 2 | DF | ARG | Daniel Galvani |

== Titles ==
- Primera D (2): 1996–97, 2020
