= Almirante Brown Partido =

Almirante Brown Partido de Almirante Brown
- Department
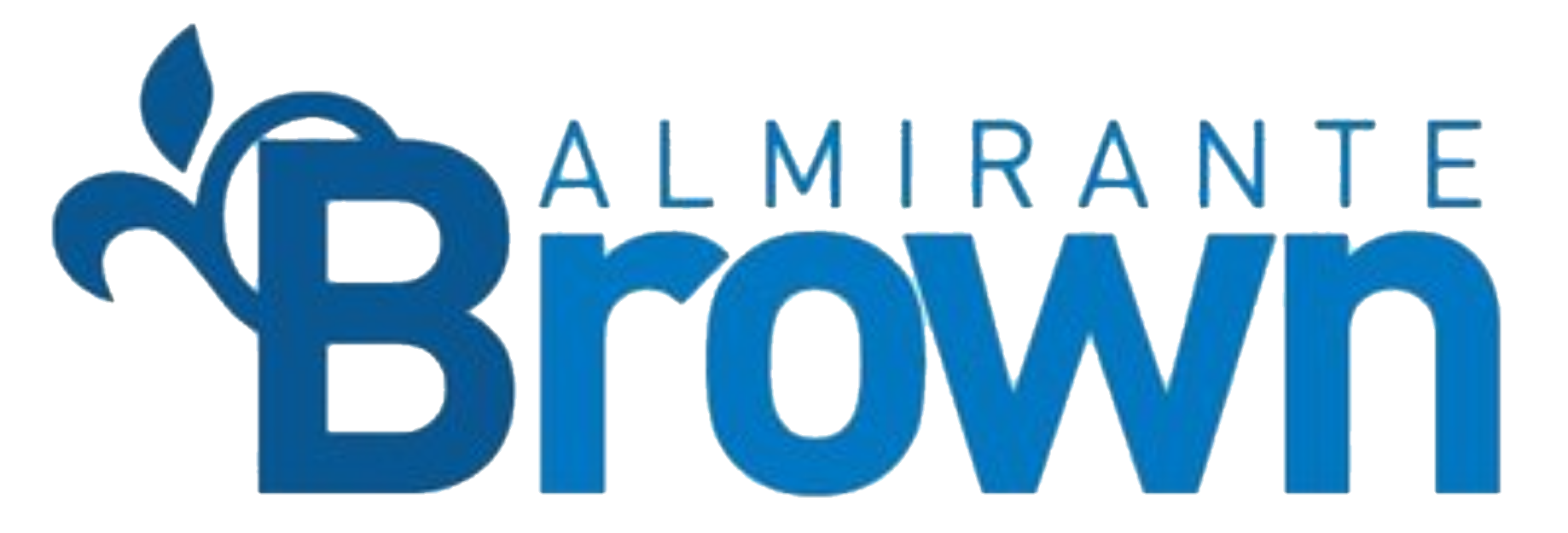
- Logo

- Almirante Brown location in Gran Buenos Aires
- Coordinates: 34°47′S 58°24′W
- Country: Argentina
- Province: Buenos Aires
- Established: 1873
- Founder: provincial law
- Seat: Adrogué

Government
  - Intendant: Juan José Fabiani (PJ)

Area
  - Total: 129.33 km^{2} (49.93 sq mi)

Population
  - Total: 555,731
  - Density: 4,297.0/km^{2} (11,129/sq mi)
- Demonym: brownense
- Postal Code: B1846
- IFAM: BUE004
- Area Code: 011
- Website: www.almirantebrown.gov.ar

Almirante Brown is a partido of the Buenos Aires Province, Argentina, located at the south of the Gran Buenos Aires urban area, at coordinates 34°47′S 58°24′W.

It has an area of 129.33 km^{2} (49.9 sq mi) and 555,731 inhabitants (2010 census [INDEC]), and its capital is Adrogué.

== Name ==
The partido is named after Irish-born General William Brown who led the Argentine navy in the Argentine War of Independence and helped the country gain its independence from the Spanish Empire.

== Cities ==
- Adrogué
- Burzaco
- Claypole
- Don Orione
- Rafael Calzada
- Glew
- Longchamps
- Malvinas Argentinas
- José Marmol
- Ministro Rivadavia
- San Francisco de Asís
- San José
- San Francisco Solano
