= La Plata station (Argentina) =

Major railway station in Argentina

Coordinates: 34°54′13″S 57°57′1″W

La Plata station Estación La Plata
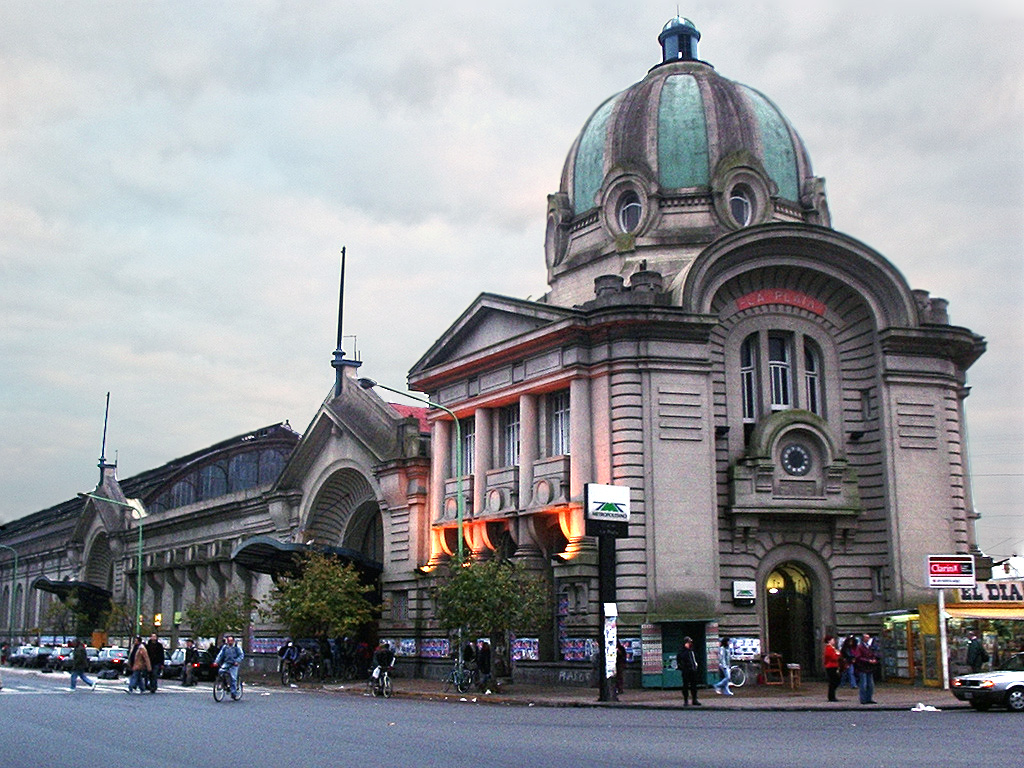

General information
- Location: La Plata Partido; Argentina
- System: Commuter rail
- Owner: Government of Argentina
- Operator: Trenes Argentinos
- Lines: Roca Line; University train of La Plata
- Platforms: 7
- Tracks: 7
- Train operators: Trenes Argentinos
- Connections: Public buses of La Plata

History
- Opened: 1 October 1906
- Electrified: Overhead line
Location

La Plata railway station (Spanish: Estación La Plata) is the principal railway station in La Plata, the capital city of the province of Buenos Aires and seat of La Plata Partido in Argentina. It is located at the intersection of Avenue 1, Avenue 44, and Diagonal 80, at the northwestern edge of the core street grid of La Plata.

It primarily serves as the southern end of a Roca Line commuter railway line that connects La Plata to Constitución railway station in the city of Buenos Aires, additionally linking it to intermediary stops in City Bell, Villa Elisa, Berazategui, Quilmes, and Sarandí.

Since 2013, it has additionally been the western terminus of the University train of La Plata, which connects the station with several of the campuses of the National University of La Plata as well as the Paseo del Bosque park.

The station has seven tracks and seven platforms.

The station originally opened on October 1, 1906 and replaced an older station on Plaza San Martin that is now home to the Dardo Rocha Cultural Center.
