= Longchamps, Argentina =

City in Argentina

Longchamps
- City
- Location in Greater Buenos Aires
- Coordinates: 34°51′S 58°23′W
- Country: Argentina
- Province: Buenos Aires
- Partido: Almirante Brown
- Elevation: 25 m (82 ft)

Population (2001 census [INDEC])
  - Total: 47,622
  - Density: 3.349/km^{2} (8.67/sq mi)
- CPA Base: B 1854
- Area code: +54 11
- Website: http://www.almirantebrown.gov.ar/

Longchamps is a city in Greater Buenos Aires, Argentina, located about 30 km south of Buenos Aires, in the Almirante Brown Partido (district).

The city is named for the race track of the same name located on the Route des Tribunes in the Bois de Boulogne at Paris, France, after which the Sociedad Hípica de Lomas de Zamora (Hipic Society of Lomas de Zamora) was inspired to name the city's own racecourse.

It is home of the Danone factory for Argentina.

== Notable people ==
- Kevin Cardozo (born 1998), footballer
