= Rafael Calzada, Buenos Aires =

Rafael Calzada
- City
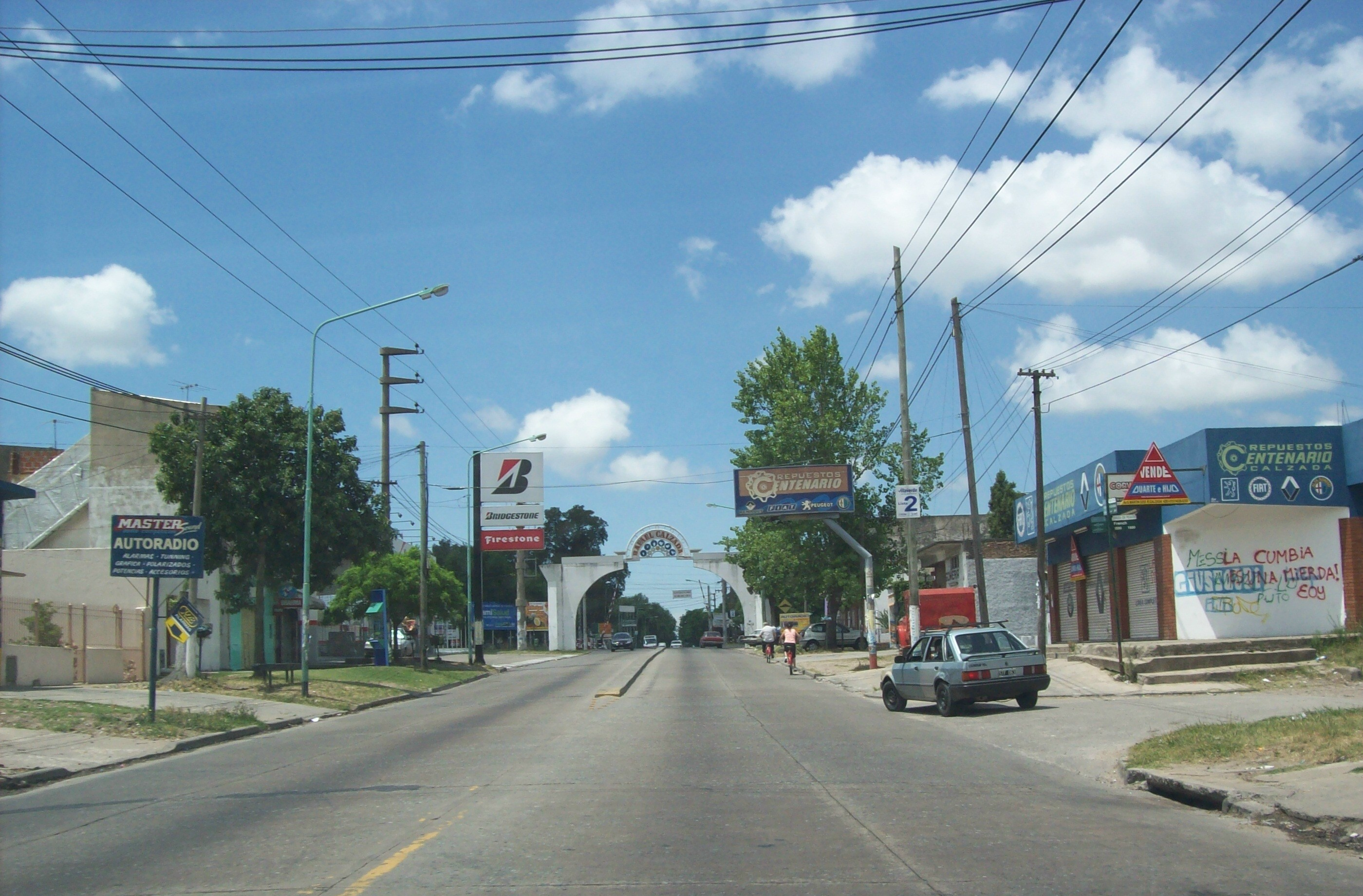
- San Martín Ave., looking eastwards. The city's arch can be seen in the background.

- Location in Greater Buenos Aires
- Coordinates: 34°47′S 58°22′W
- Country: Argentina
- Province: Buenos Aires
- Partido: Almirante Brown
- Established: 18 July 1909
- Elevation: 24 m (79 ft)

Population (2001 census [INDEC])
  - Total: 56,419
  - Density: 7,091/km^{2} (18,370/sq mi)
- CPA Base: B 1847
- Area code: +54 11

Rafael Calzada is an Argentine city (Spanish: ciudad) within the Almirante Brown Partido, which is located in the Greater Buenos Aires conurbation, Argentina. It has an area of 5.14 km^{2} and a population of 56,419 (2001 census [INDEC]). The city is linked with Buenos Aires by a railway station having the same name; both electric and diesel services stop at the station. It is also served by a number of buses that converge into the train station, and connect it with neighbour cities, as well as with Buenos Aires.

It was officially founded on 18 July 1909 by Dr. Rafael Calzada, a Spanish Argentine attorney and legal theorist. The suburban bedroom community's principal architectural landmark, The Church of the Holy Trinity, was designed by local architect Juan Fogeler in 1922, and consecrated in 1933. The church was designated as a parish in 1951. The community has been served by the Celina González Peña de Calzada Library (in honor of the founder's widow) since 1954, and the Dr. Arturo Oñativia Emergency Hospital since 1996.

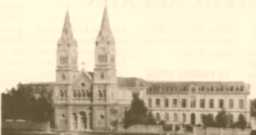
Parish of the Holy Trinity
