= Glew, Argentina =

Glew
- City
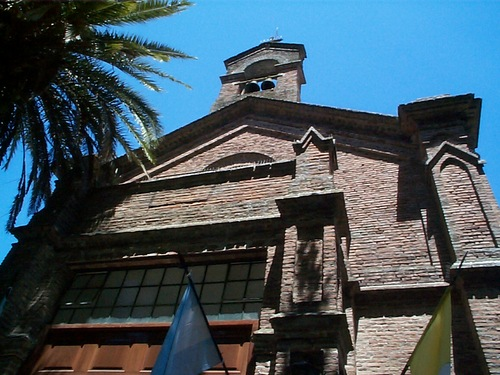
- Santa Ana Parish

- Location in Buenos Aires Province
- Coordinates: 34°53′S 58°23′W
- Country: Argentina
- Province: Buenos Aires
- Partido: Almirante Brown
- Elevation: 28 m (92 ft)

Population (2001 census [INDEC])
  - Total: 57,878
- CPA Base: B 1856
- Area code: +54 11-2224
- Website: www.almirantebrown.gov.ar

Glew is a city in southern Almirante Brown Partido, Buenos Aires Province, Argentina. Its municipal area of 17.65 km^{2} (6.81 mi^{2}) holds a population of 57,878 (2001 census [INDEC]). It is located 34 km (21 mi) from Buenos Aires city, and connected to it by the Ferrocarril General Roca.

The city originated with the purchase of the land in 1857 by Juan Glew, who established an estancia there. He donated land for the extension of the Buenos Aires Great Southern Railway in 1865, and a permanent settlement was founded at the site on August 14 by the name of Pueblo Cambaceres (in honor of Antonio Cambaceres, a distinguished writer and legislator who owned an adjacent lot).

The Parish of St. Anne was consecrated in 1905. This small church was chosen in 1953 by a frequent summer visitor, painter Raúl Soldi, for the creation of a series of murals, and on his initiative, the Fundación Soldi was established in Glew in 1979 for the promotion of the arts.

== Borders ==
- North: Town of Longchamps
- East: Town of Ministro Rivadavia
- West: Esteban Echeverria Partido
- South: Presidente Perón Partido
