= Claypole, Argentina =

Claypole
- City
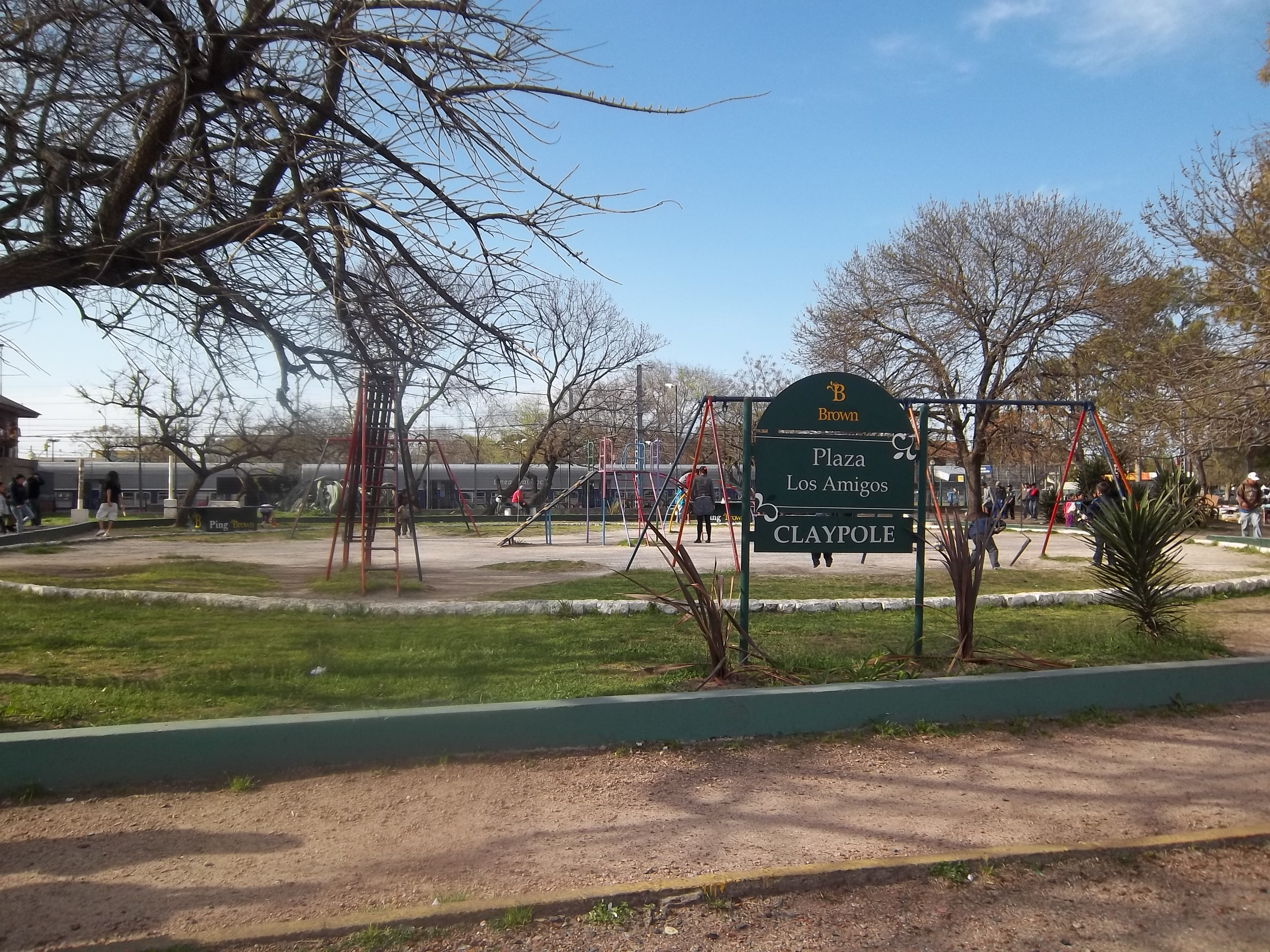
- Los Amigos Square

- Location in Greater Buenos Aires
- Coordinates: 34°48′S 58°20′W
- Country: Argentina
- Province: Buenos Aires
- Partido: Almirante Brown
- Elevation: 17 m (56 ft)

Population (2001 census [INDEC])
  - Total: 41,176
- CPA Base: B 1849
- Website: www.almirantebrown.gov.ar

Claypole (Argentine Spanish pronunciation: [ˈklai̯.po.le]) is an Argentine city located in the southern part of the Almirante Brown Partido, Buenos Aires Province with a population of 41,176 (2001 census [INDEC]).

== History ==
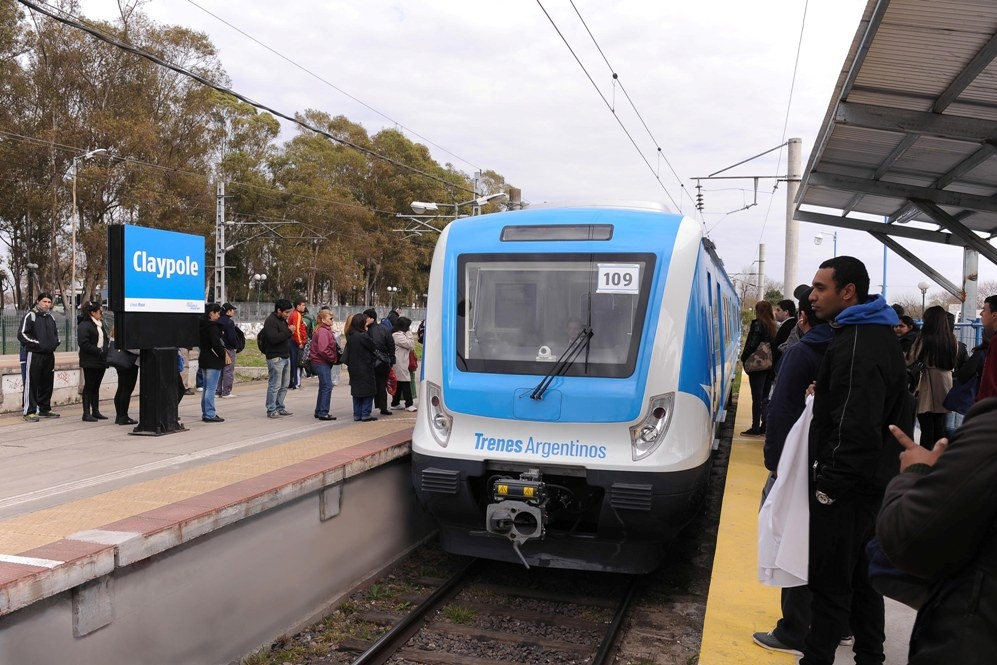
Current Claypole train station on the Roca Line.

The lands were purchased by the Franciscan Congregation to establish a farm and provide produce to their convent in Buenos Aires, and after a few years it was purchased by the Obligado family. Julia Obligado, by then married to Pedro Claypole, donated the land for the local train station in 1876 upon the announcement of plans for a Buenos Aires Great Southern Railway line in the area. The station was thus named for Pedro Claypole, and the arrival of the first train on April 15, 1884, became the establishment date of the town itself.

The town's first school, Ejército de los Andes, was opened in 1906 at the home of a Mrs. Hebbel, later operated at the home of the Baile family. The Pequeño Cottolengo Argentino de Don Orione school opened in 1935, transforming the previous school into a Christian center for the needy.

Furst-Zapiola, a prominent local realty, later donated lots for local institutions such as School Nº 10, the Police Station, the Local Development Society, the Post Office, and City Delegation Hall. The Centro Tradicionalista Viejo Gaucho, a society for the promotion of gaucho traditions, was established in 1991 in Claypole by Antonio Marcatario.

== Sports ==
The city is the site of Club Atlético Claypole which plays at the fourth level league Primera C of Argentine football.

== Notable people ==
- Sergio Martínez (born 21 February 1975), world middleweight champion
