= 1983 Argentine Campeonato Nacional finals =

1983 Campeonato Nacional finals
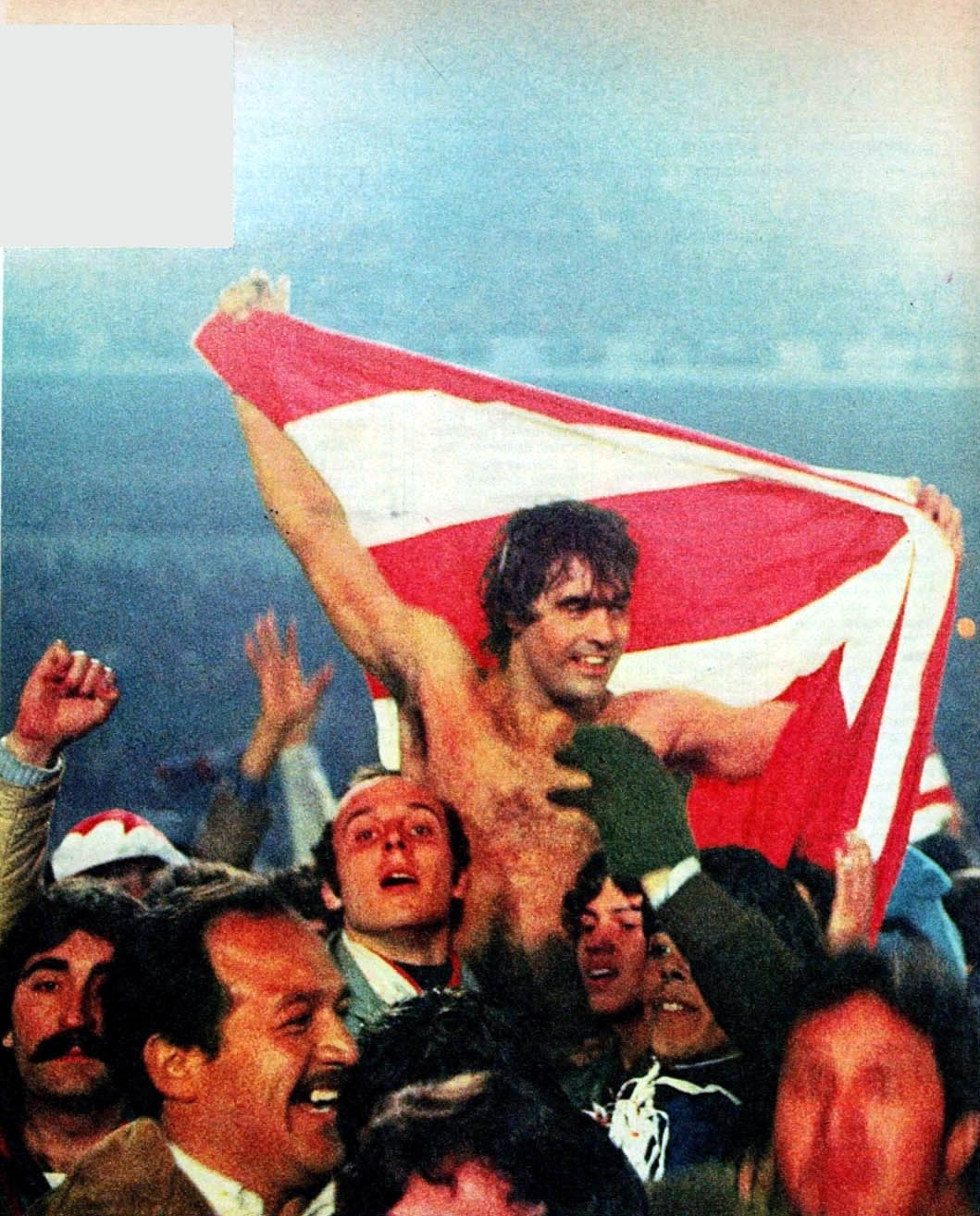
- Captain of Estudiantes LP José Luis Brown celebrating in Avellaneda
- Event: 1983 Campeonato Nacional
Estudiantes (LP)	Independiente
3	2
- on goal difference

First leg
Estudiantes (LP)	Independiente
2	0
- Date: 4 June 1983
- Venue: Estadio Jorge Hirschi, La Plata
- Referee: Juan C. Loustau

Secong leg
Independiente	Estudiantes (LP)
2	1
- Date: 10 June 1983
- Venue: La Doble Visera, Avellaneda
- Referee: Arturo Ithurralde

The 1983 Campeonato Nacional finals were the final matches of the 1983 Campeonato Nacional, the second of the two league championships held during the 92nd. season of the Argentine Primera División. The series were contested by Estudiantes (LP) (who played their 3rd. Primera División final) and Independiente (contesting their 5th. final).

The first leg was held in Estadio Jorge Hirschi in La Plata, while the second leg was held in La Doble Visera in Avellaneda, home venues of Estudiantes LP and Independiente respectively.

Estudiantes defeated Independiente 3–2 on goal difference to win their 4th. Primera División title.

== Qualified teams ==
Team	Previous app.
Estudiantes (LP)	**1967 Met**, 1968 Met
Independiente	1912 (FAF), 1932, **1977 Nac**, **1978 Nac**

- Bold: indicates winning years
- Met: Campeonato Metropolitano
- Nac: Campeonato Nacional

== Venues ==
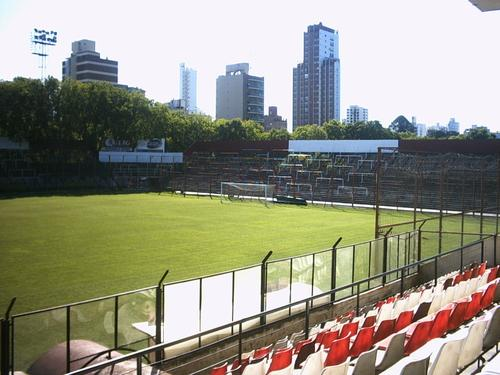
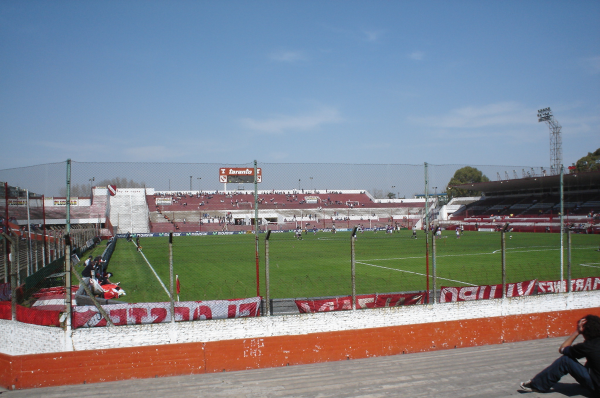
Estadio Jorge Hirschi in La Plata (left) and La Doble Visera in Avellaneda were the venues

== Road to the final ==
Participant teams were divided into 8 groups of 4 teams each. They played each other in a double round-robin tournament. The best two placed teams of each group qualified to the second stage.

Estudiantes (LP)				Round	Independiente			
Opponent	Result			Group stage	Opponent	Result		
Unión (SF)	1–1 (A)			Matchday 1	Chaco For Ever	2–0 (H)		
Racing (C)	1–3 (A)			Matchday 2	San Martín (T)	4–0 (H)		
Unión San Vicente	5–0 (H)			Matchday 3	Argentinos Juniors	0–0 (A)		
Racing (C)	3–2 (H)			Matchday 4	San Martín (T)	2–0 (A)		
Unión San Vicente	4–2 (A)			Matchday 5	Argentinos Juniors	1–1 (H)		
Unión (SF)	0–0 (H)			Matchday 6	Chaco for Ever	2–2 (A)		
**Group H winners**: Pos. / Team / Pts / W / T / L / Pl; 1 / Racing (C) / 8 / 3 / 2 / 1 / 6; 2 / Estudiantes (LP) / 8 / 3 / 2 / 1 / 6; 3 / Unión (SF) / 7 / 2 / 3 / 1 / 6; 4 / Unión San Vicente / 1 / 0 / 1 / 5 / 6				Final standings (1st stage)	**Group B winners**: Pos. / Team / Pts / W / T / L / Pl; 1 / Independiente / 9 / 3 / 3 / 0 / 6; 2 / Argentinos Juniors / 9 / 3 / 3 / 0 / 6; 3 / San Martín (T) / 3 / 1 / 1 / 4 / 6; 4 / Chaco for Ever / 3 / 1 / 1 / 4 / 6			
Opponent	Agg.	1st leg	2nd leg	Knockout stage	Opponent	Agg.	1st leg	2nd leg
Ferro Carril Oeste	3–2	1–0 (H)	2–2 (A)	Round of 16	Unión (SF)	1–1 (6–5 p)	0–1	1–0 (a.e.t.)
Racing	4–3	3–1 (H)	1–2 (A)	Quarterfinals	Racing (C)	2–2 (4–2 p)	1–1 (A)	1–1 (a.e.t.) (H)
Temperley	4–2	1–1 (H)	3–1 (a.e.t.) (A)	Semifinals	Argentinos Juniors	3–2	1–2 (A)	2–0 (H)

== Matches ==
=== First leg ===
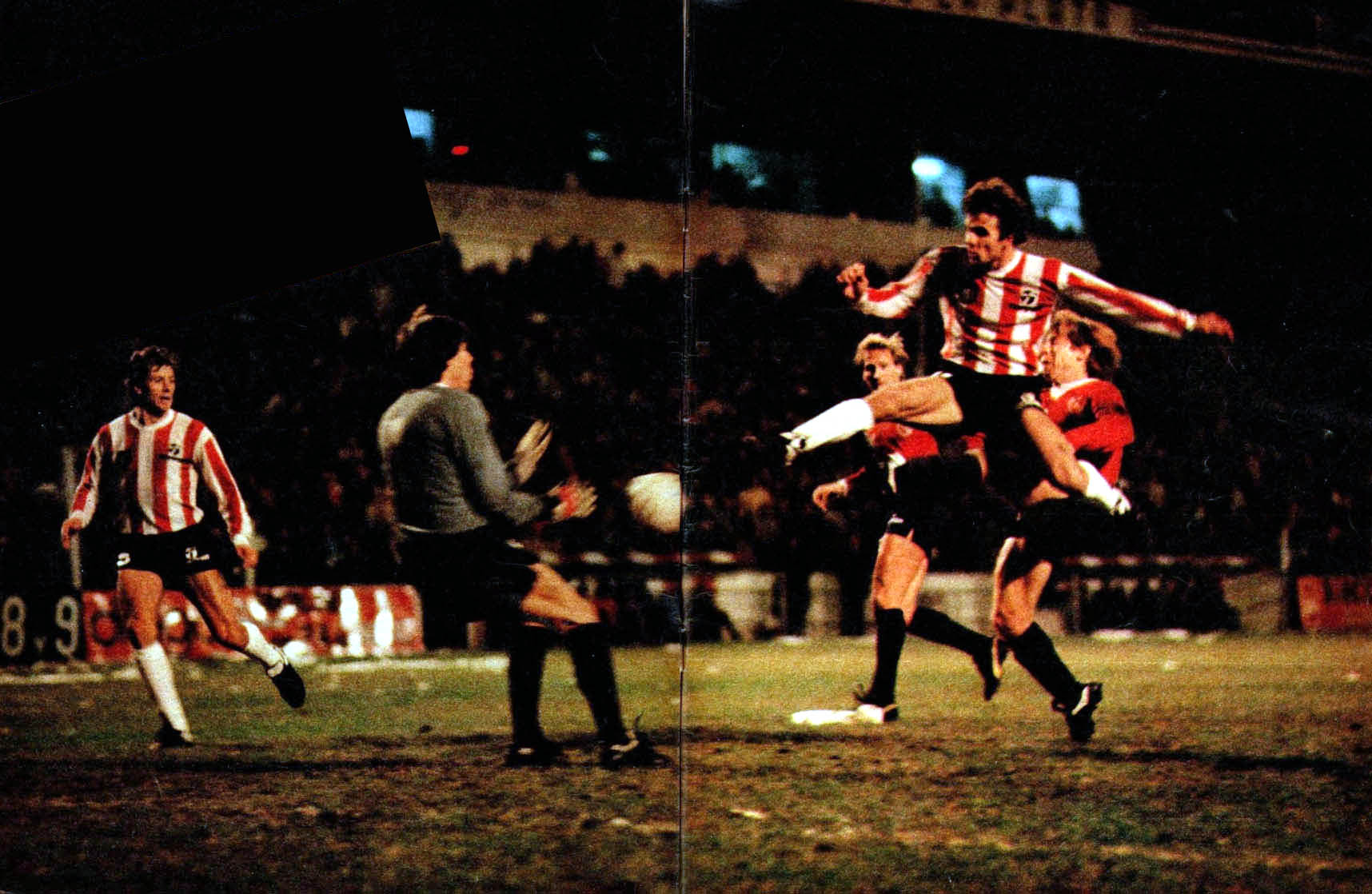
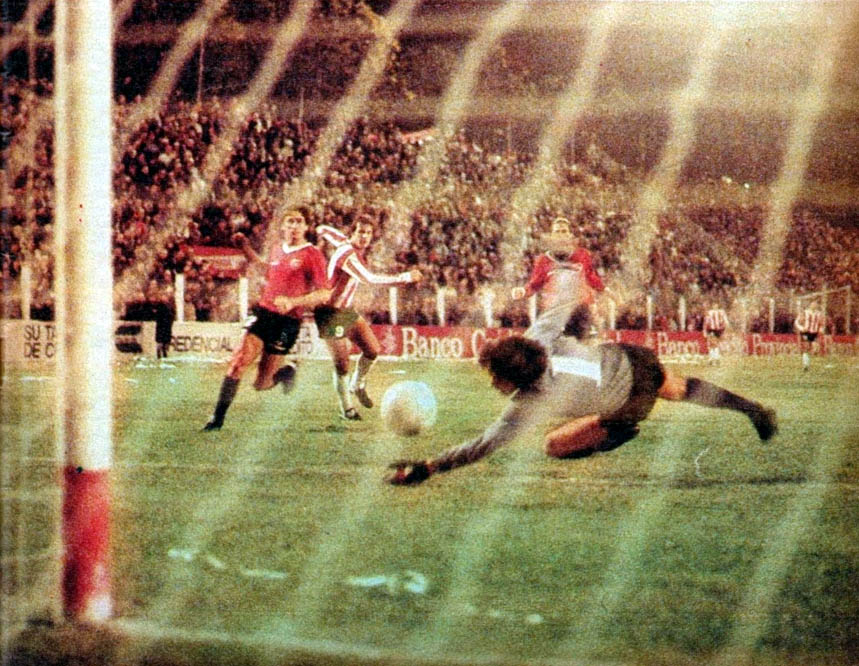
Estudiantes LP's goals by Hugo Gottardi (left) and Guillermo Trama

Sports journalist Julio C. Pasquatto praised Estudiantes LP's performance in the first match, describing the team as "total football", which was (according to his words) the dream of managers such as Carlos Bilardo (who was in fact the builder of the 1980s Estudiantes LP), Ángel Labruna, César Menotti, and other coaches who shared the thought that success could not be separated from beauty. Pasquatto also praised the individual performances of Estudiantes' midfield line, that was the heart of the team.

In terms of individual performances, Alejandro Sabella was highly praised as the main playmaker of the team (the other two were Marcelo Trobbiani and José Daniel Ponce), highlighting his skills and ability to improvise but his tackle when the rival was in ball control.

On the other side, Independiente's poor performance in the match was emphasized by their manager Nito Veiga, who said "the team only appeared in the second half".

1983 Torneo Nacional Final
4 June 1983
First leg

Estudiantes (LP)	2–0	Independiente
Gottardi; Trama	Report

Estadio Jorge Luis Hirschi, La Plata
Referee: Juan C. Lousteau

**Estudiantes LP**	**Independiente**

GK	1	(Argentina) Carlos Bertero
DF	2	(Argentina) Julián Camino
DF	3	(Argentina) José Luis Brown
DF	4	(Argentina) Rubén Agüero
DF	5	(Argentina) Abel Herrera
MF	7	(Argentina) José Daniel Ponce
MF	6	(Argentina) Miguel Ángel Russo
MF	10	(Argentina) Alejandro Sabella
MF	8	(Argentina) Marcelo Trobbiani
FW	9	(Argentina) Guillermo Trama
FW	11	(Argentina) Hugo Gottardi
Manager:
(Argentina) Eduardo Manera

GK	1	(Uruguay) Carlos Goyén
DF	4	(Argentina) Néstor Clausen
DF	2	(Argentina) Hugo Villaverde
DF	6	(Argentina) Enzo Trossero
DF	3	(Argentina) Mario Killer
MF	11	(Argentina) Carlos A. Carrizo
MF	5	(Argentina) Claudio Marangoni
MF	10	(Argentina) Ricardo Bochini
MF	8	(Argentina) Jorge Burruchaga
FW	7	(Argentina) Gabriel Calderón
FW	9	(Argentina) Carlos Morete
Manager:
(Argentina) Nito Veiga

=== Second leg ===
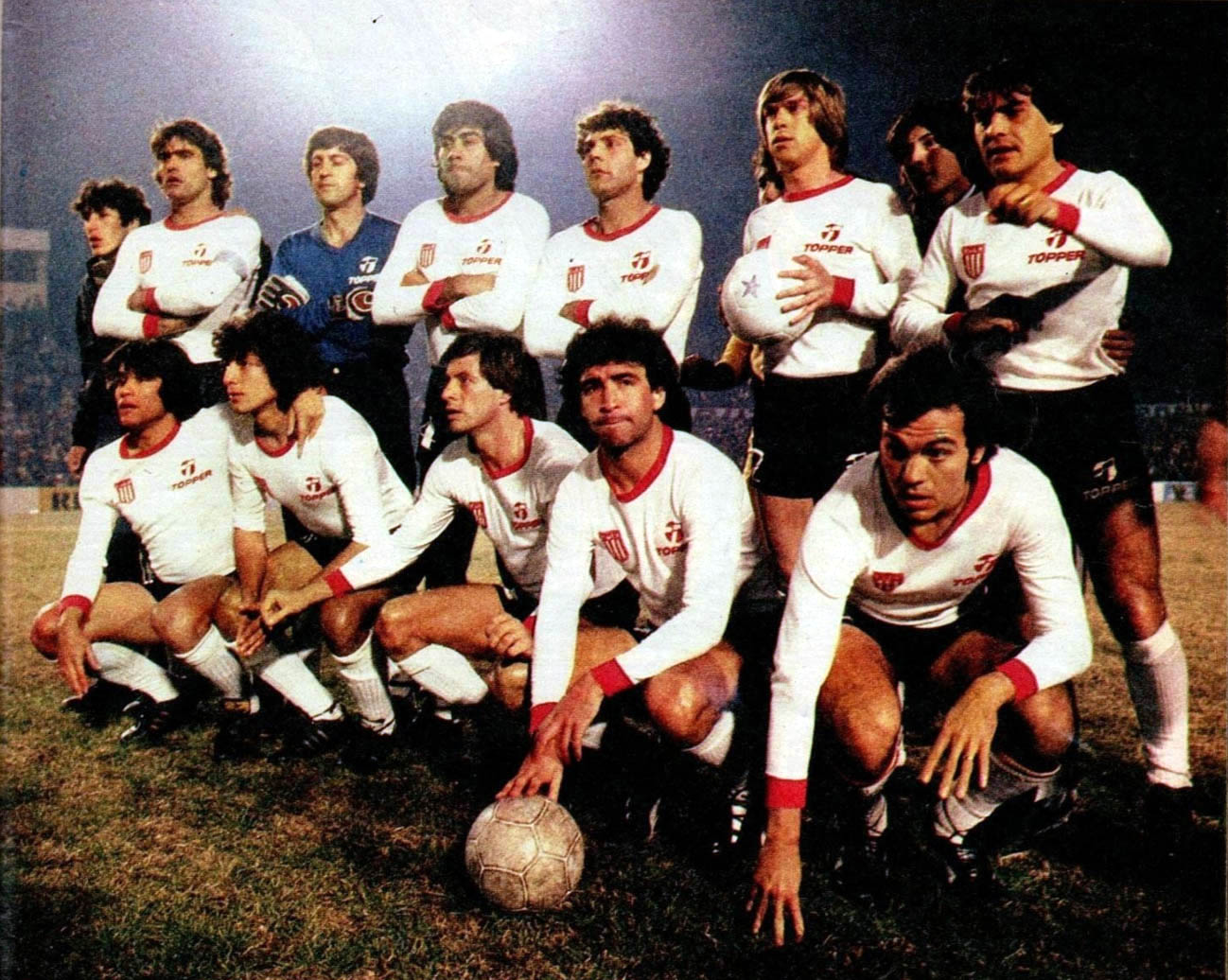
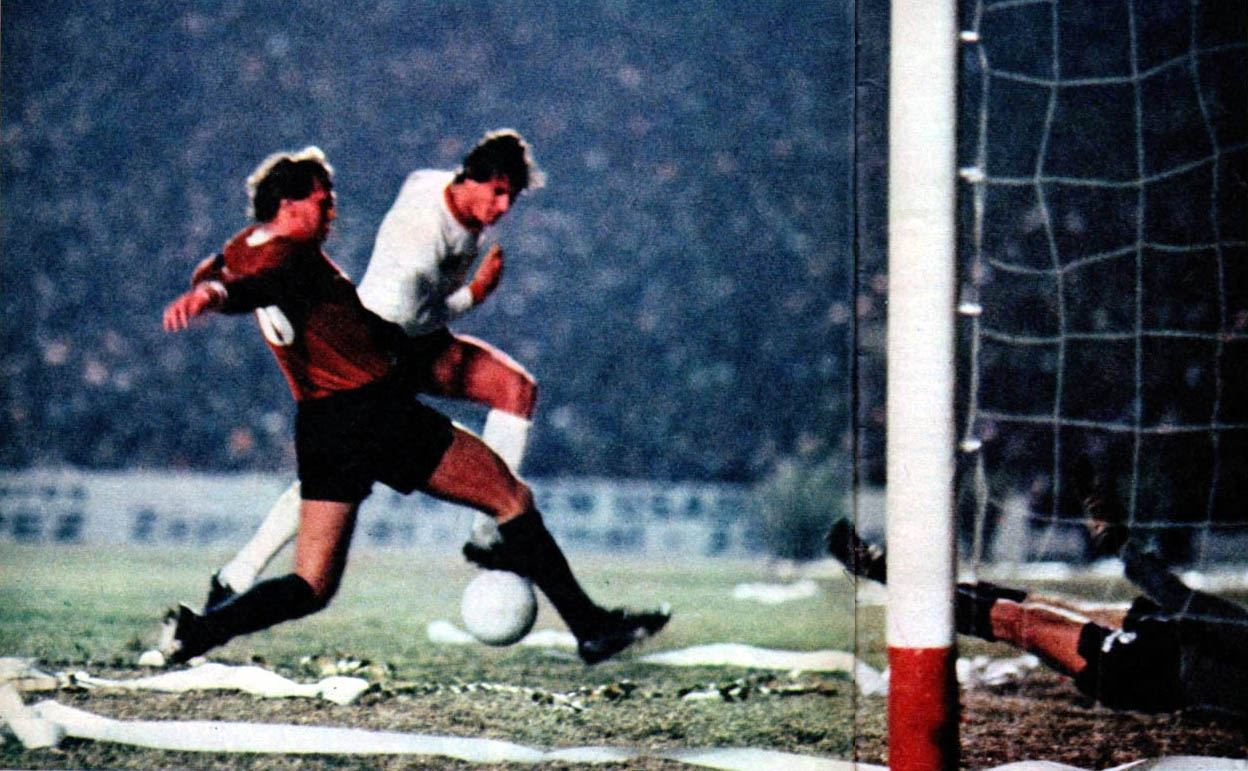
(Left): team of Estudiantes LP; (right) the goal by Guillermo Trama, who shot before Enzo Trossero cut him

Because of goal difference (2–0 in favor of Estudiantes) after the first leg, Independiente went on the attack from the start, while their rival held firm with their defensive strength, supported by the good play of their midfielders, but diminished in attack due to the absence of Hugo Gottardi (transferred to Independiente Santa Fe), despite the efforts of his replacement, Hugo Gurrieri.

In the 14th minute, Ricardo Bochini passed the ball to Ricardo Giusti, who was coming down the left flank, he received in the penalty area anticipating defenders José Luis Brown and Rubén Agüero and shot to score the first goal for Independiente. Estudiantes' based their movements on counter-attacks, which were slow and predictable.

In the 25th minute, Bochini again passed to Giusti, but the goal was disallowed by referee Arturo Ithurralde who alleged Giusti had touched the ball with his hand. But despite Independiente's dominance, Estudiantes managed to equalize when Hugo Villaverde fouled Sergio Gurrieri, José Daniel Ponce took the free kick, which goalkeeper Mario Goyén saved, but Guillermo Trama pounced on the rebound to score.

In the second half, Estudiantes pushed forward to play the game in midfield, but Independiente continued to attack, although without creating any real scoring opportunities. Nevertheless in the 70th minute winger Gabriel Calderón passed from the right band to Enzo Trossero, who shot from outside the area to score the 2nd. goal for Independiente.

10 June 1983
Second leg

Independiente	2–1	Estudiantes (LP)
Giusti 14'; Trossero 70'	Report	Trama 44'

Independiente Stadium, Avellaneda
Referee: (Argentina) Arturo Ithurralde

**Independiente**	**Estudiantes LP**

GK	1	(Uruguay) Carlos Goyén
DF	4	(Argentina) Néstor Clausen
DF	2	(Argentina) Hugo Villaverde
DF	6	(Argentina) Enzo Trossero
DF	3	(Argentina) Mario Killer
MF	8	(Argentina) Ricardo Giusti
MF	5	(Argentina) Claudio Marangoni
MF	10	(Argentina) Ricardo Bochini
MF	11	(Argentina) Jorge Burruchaga
FW	7	(Argentina) Gabriel Calderón
FW	9	(Argentina) Carlos Morete
Manager:
(Argentina) Nito Veiga

GK	1	(Argentina) Carlos Bertero
DF	2	(Argentina) Julián Camino
DF	3	(Argentina) José Luis Brown
DF	4	(Argentina) Rubén Agüero
DF	5	(Argentina) Abel Herrera
MF	7	(Argentina) José Daniel Ponce
MF	6	(Argentina) Miguel Ángel Russo
MF	10	(Argentina) Alejandro Sabella
FW	8	(Argentina) Marcelo Trobbiani
FW	9	(Argentina) Guillermo Trama
FW	11	(Argentina) Sergio Gurrieri
Manager:
(Argentina) Eduardo Manera

== Aftermath ==
It was the first title won by Estudiantes LP under the coaching of Eduardo Luján Manera, who had replaced legend Carlos Bilardo after he was appointed as manager of the Argentina national team. Manera was Bilardo's assistant coach when Estudiantes won the 1982 title.

The team was nicknamed the Lion due to their bravery.

We had just won the Metropolitano with Bilardo, and with that momentum, we also won the Nacional. The team always went out to win matches, and we prevailed in those finals against the team that a year later would become champions of America and the World, with Bochini and Burruchaga among others.

— Julián Camino in an interview in 2023

Journalist Víctor Hugo Morales also praised Estudiantes de La Plata on a column opinion, reviewed the controversy between the philosofies of César Menotti and Carlos Bilardo, which were seen as antithetical at the time. According to his opinion, the established opinion about Bilardo's concepts and tactics was that his style killed the player's creativity. Morales defined Estudiantes as "the team of very good players who have the simple advantage of combining their skills and subtracting their weaknesses". He also highlighted the "extraordinary espectacle" that both teams gave in the finals.

== Bibliography ==
- El Gráfico editions:
  - 3322, 7 June 1983
  - 3323, 14 June 1983
