= Marcelo Trobbiani =

Argentine footballer and manager

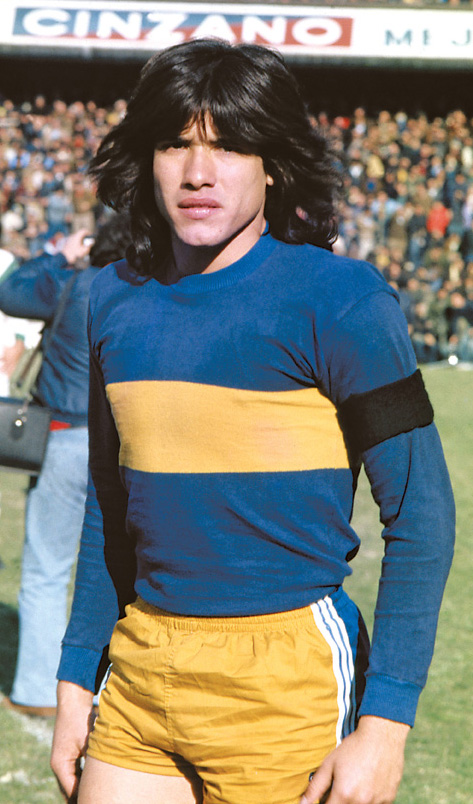
- Trobbiani while playing for Boca Juniors in the 1970s

Personal information
- Full name: Marcelo Antonio Trobbiani Ughetto
- Date of birth: 17 February 1955 (age 71)
- Place of birth: Casilda, Argentina
- Height: 1.75 m (5 ft 9 in)
- Position: Attacking midfielder

Senior career*
Years	Team	Apps	(Gls)
1973–1976	Boca Juniors	107	(26)
1976–1980	Elche	159	(38)
1980	Real Zaragoza	15	(2)
1981–1982	Boca Juniors	28	(3)
1982–1983	Estudiantes	?	(?)
1984–1986	Millonarios	41	(10)
1986	Elche	8	(2)
1987–1988	Estudiantes	?	(?)
1988–1989	Cobreloa	54	(12)
1989–1992	Barcelona SC	29	(4)
1993	Talleres de Córdoba	3	(0)

International career
1974–1986	Argentina	15	(1)

Managerial career
- 2004: Universitario
- 2005: Provincial Osorno
- 2006–2008: Boca Juniors (assistant)
- 2008–2009: Cobreloa
- 2009: Cienciano
- 2011: Cienciano
- 2012–2013: Argentina U-20
- 2013: Sport Huancayo
- 2014: Cobreloa
Medal record
Representing Argentina
FIFA World Cup
Winner	1986 Mexico	Team
- * Club domestic league appearances and goals as of 13 July 2014

Marcelo Antonio Trobbiani Ughetto (born 17 February 1955 in Casilda, Santa Fe) is an Argentine football coach and a former player, who played as an attacking midfielder. He currently works as the manager of River Ecuador in Ecuador.

== Playing career ==
An attacking midfielder, Trobbiani was one of the promising young stars to rise in Boca Juniors during the early 1970s. As a juvenile, he debuted in 1973 with the national team when Omar Sivori drafted him for the "phantom squad" that had to play Bolivia for a ticket to the 1974 World Cup. Following the exit of Reinaldo Merlo, he wore the national colours, before Boca's then coach Rogelio Domínguez was aware of his existence.

In 1975, Trobbiani shared Boca's midfield with Benítez, Suñé and Potente, and was criticized for hogging the ball, to the point that fans called him calesita (merry-go-round). After the 1976 season, Trobbiani was sold to Spain in 1976. Boca used the money to buy many players in the local market, starting a major winning streak with coach Juan Carlos Lorenzo.

Trobbiani played for Spanish sides Elche and Real Zaragoza, and acquired European discipline and tactical depth. Trobbiani arrived at Elche with the club playing in La Liga, but after narrowly avoiding relegation in his first season the club was relegated after his second season. He clashed with Elche coaches Roque Olsen and Heriberto Herrera while the club struggled to gain promotion back to La Liga. After Elche missed out on promotion in the last match of the 1979–80 season, Trobbiani left for Real Zaragoza. When he returned to play for Boca in 1981 alongside Diego Maradona, fans saw a more effective player. The team won the 1981 Metropolitano.

In mid-1982, Trobbiani was transferred to Estudiantes de La Plata. Coach Carlos Bilardo made Trobbiani play as a deep-lying centre-forward linking the strong midfield (Russo, Ponce and Sabella) to strikers Trama and Gottardi. The team won two back-to-back championships.

After the 1986 World Cup in Mexico, Trobbiani was again playing for Elche CF. National coach Bilardo called Trobbiani for the tournament, making it clear that he would mainly be used for tactical practice games. He worked tirelessly during the month-long stay in Mexico, where he was Jorge Valdano's roommate, and was rewarded with exactly two minutes of play—the last two minutes of the final match against Germany, coming on for Jorge Burruchaga, who had scored the winning goal minutes earlier, in a deliberate time-wasting tactic. His only touch of the ball was a back-heel pass.

Before retirement, Trobbiani showed his class at Chilean side Cobreloa, Ecuadorian side Barcelona SC (with whom he reached the Copa Libertadores finals in 1990) and back in Argentina with Talleres de Córdoba.

== Managerial career ==
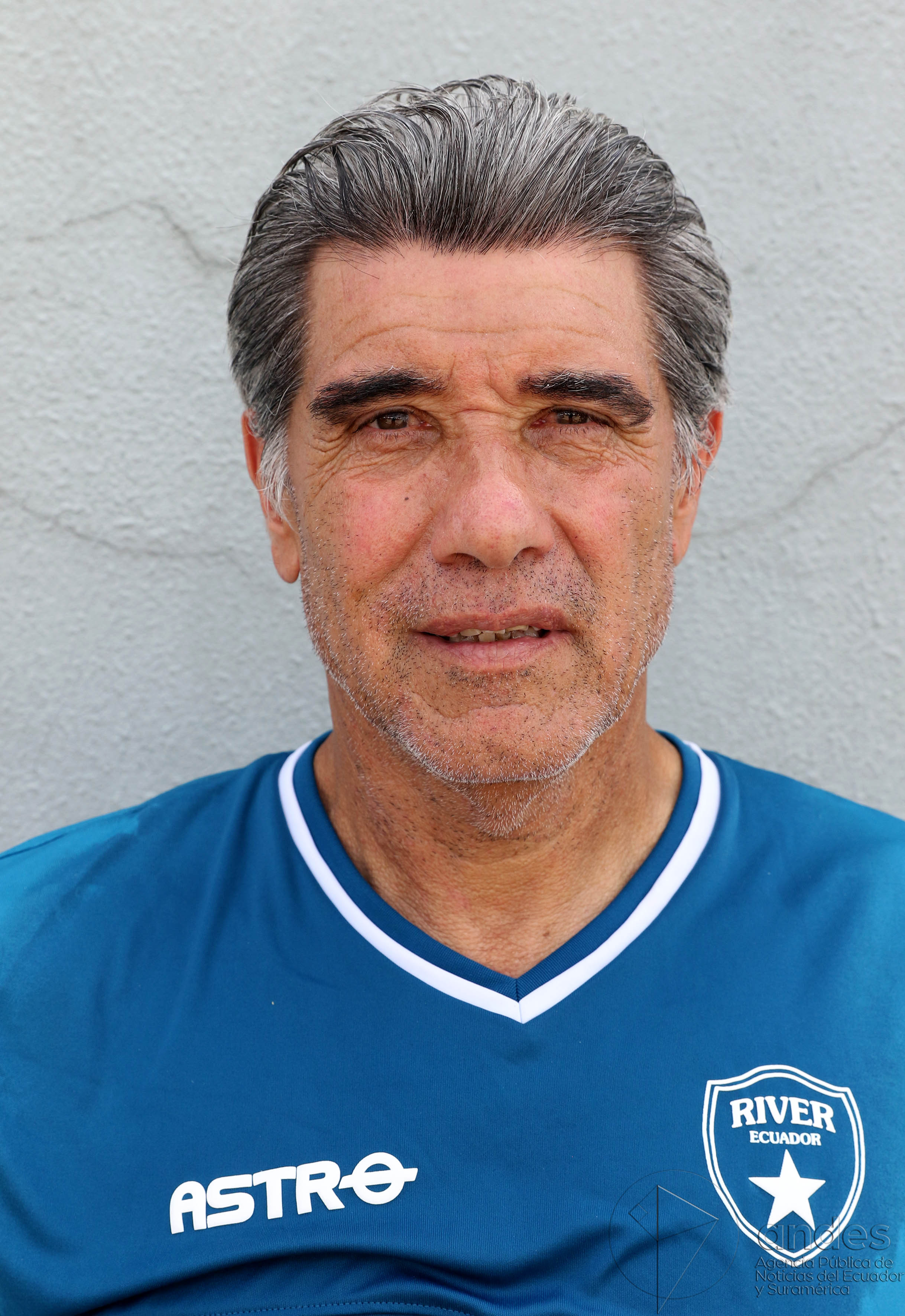
Trobbiani in 2016

Trobbiani went on to coach several teams in South America, with little success. He was sacked from Universitario de Deportes from Peru at the end of 2004. Between 2006 and 2008, he worked as Russo's assistant coach at Boca Juniors, together with former teammate Gottardi.

Between 2008 and 2009 he returned to Chilean football to work as the manager of Cobreloa, where he had played in the late 1980s. In 2009, he was appointed as the manager of Peruvian side Cienciano. On March 20, 2011, he was involved in a bitter dispute with fellow Argentine manager Guillermo Rivarola of Sporting Cristal after the ex-River player complained to the referee in order to get Trobbiani sent off.

Trobbiani managed the Argentina national under-20 football team at the 2013 South American Youth Football Championship, where the team failed to progress from the group stage.

On September 18, 2013, as coach of Sport Huancayo, he was accused of racism and discrimination by three Brazilian players, Rafael Da Silva, Andrey Nunes y Kleyr Vieira, who played in the team.

== Honours ==
=== Domestic ===
Boca Juniors

- Primera División (2): 1976 Metropolitano, 1981 Metropolitano

Estudiantes (LP)

- Primera División (2): 1982 Metropolitano, 1983 Nacional

Millonarios F.C.

- Categoría Primera A runner-up: 1984

Cobreloa

- Primera División (1): 1988

Barcelona (Ecu)

- Serie A (1): 1991
- Copa Libertadores runner-up: 1990

=== International ===
Argentina Youth

- Toulon Tournament (1): 1975

Argentina

- FIFA World Cup (1): 1986
