= Julián Camino =

Argentine footballer (born 1961)

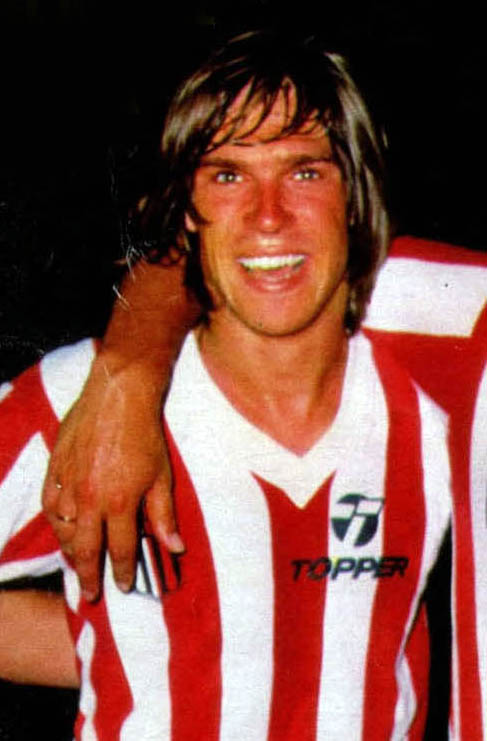
- Camino with Estudiantes LP in 1983

Personal information
- Date of birth: 2 May 1961 (age 65)
- Place of birth: Maipú, Argentina
- Position: Right back

Youth career
- Estudiantes de La Plata

Senior career*
Years	Team	Apps	(Gls)
1979–1987	Estudiantes de La Plata	198	(6)
1987	Argentinos Juniors		
1988–1990	East Bengal		
1990	Beitar Tel Aviv		
1990	Juventud Unida		
1990–1991	Belgrano de Córdoba		

International career
1983–1985	Argentina	11	(0)
- * Club domestic league appearances and goals as of 2009

Julián Camino (born 2 May 1961 in Maipú) is an Argentine former football right back who won two league titles with Estudiantes de La Plata and was part of the Argentina squad for Copa América 1983, and since August 2011 is a member of the coaching squad of the Argentina national football team as field assistant to Alejandro Sabella.

== Playing career ==
Camino was a product of the Estudiantes de La Plata youth system and became the team's right back during the 1982 season. His frequent and efficient transitions to attacking positions caused national coach (and Camino's former mentor in Estudiantes) Carlos Bilardo, to call Camino to the national team in 1983.

He was in the National team for the 1983 Copa América. In 1984, he played for the national team playing Nehru Cup in India. In 1988 Camino came back to India to play for Kingfisher East Bengal in the Rover's Cup. While playing for East Bengal, he changed his position from right back to midfield. There were 1,20,000 spectators in one of the matches he played against Mohun Bagan. East Bengal could not keep him longer due to financial constraints. Leaving East Bengal, he joined Beitar Tel Aviv F.C. presently Beitar Shimshon Tel Aviv F.C. in Israel and played there for 3 years.

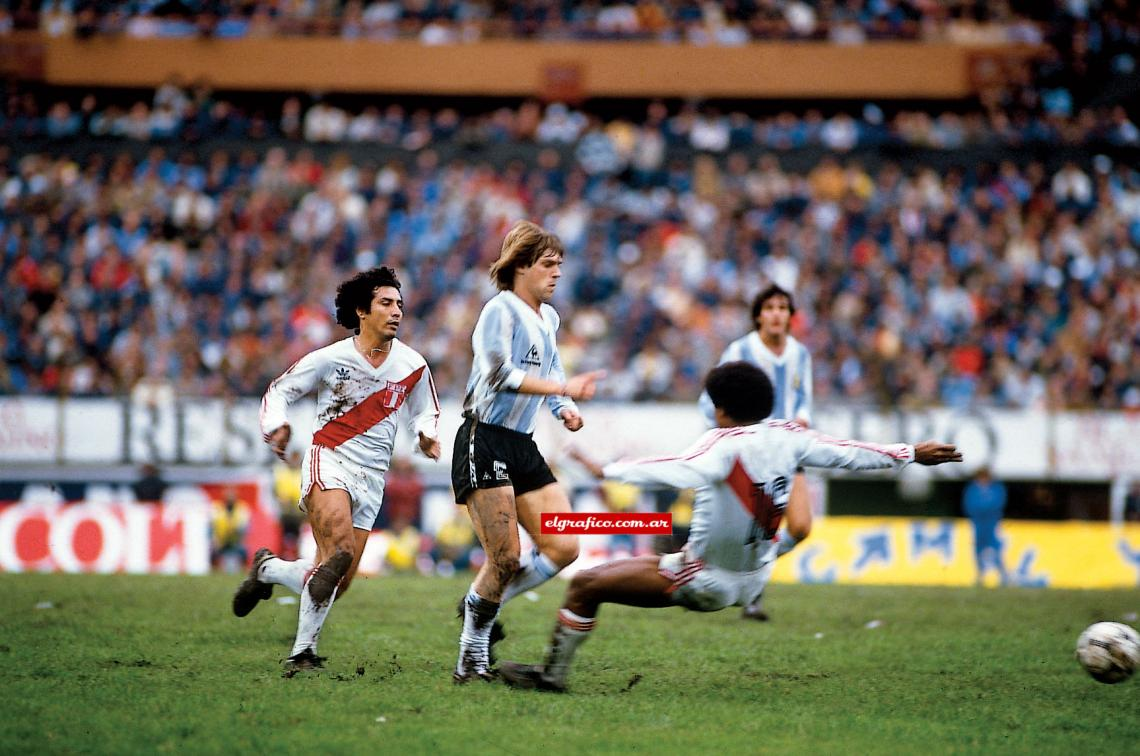
Camino playing for Argentina v Peru in 1985

A noted moment in Camino's performance on the national team was a harsh foul against Peruvian Franco Navarro during a 1986 FIFA World Cup qualifier. Camino was not sent off, but his international career never recovered. He played for several teams in Argentina and abroad before retiring in 1991.

After retirement, Camino was part of Alejandro Sabella's coaching team in Estudiantes that obtained the 2009 Copa Libertadores and the 2010 Apertura. When Sabella was called to coach the national team in 2011 following the sacking of Sergio Batista, Sabella's staff was reassembled, including Camino, Claudio Gugnali, and fitness coach Pablo Blanco.

== Honours ==
Estudiantes de La Plata

- Primera División Argentina: Metropolitano 1982, Nacional 1983
