= Ricardo Infante =

Argentine football player and manager

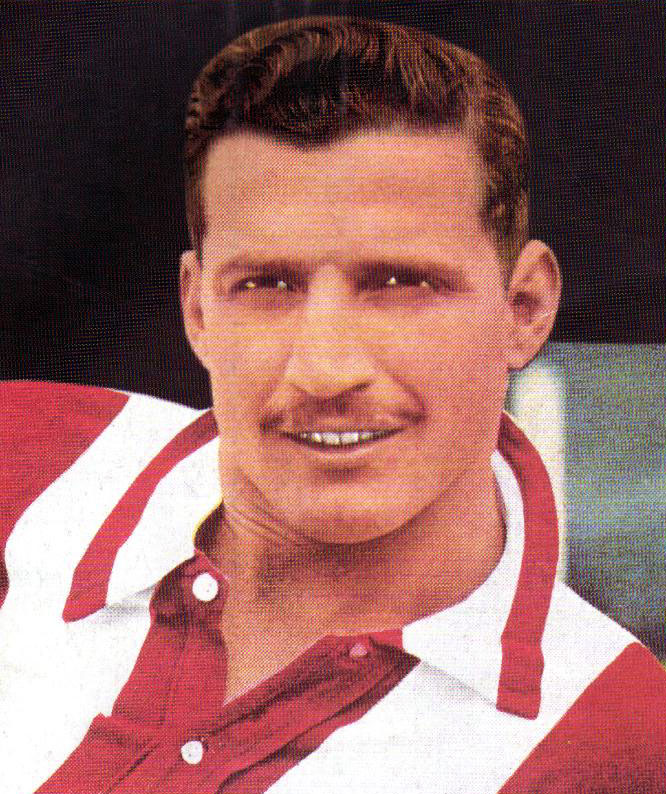

Personal information
- Full name: Ricardo Roberto Infante
- Date of birth: 21 June 1924
- Place of birth: La Plata, Argentina
- Date of death: 13 December 2008
- Position: Striker

Youth career
- 1940–1942: Estudiantes

Senior career*
Years	Team	Apps	(Gls)
1942–1952	Estudiantes	329	(180)
1953–1956	Huracán	94	(31)
1957–1960	Estudiantes	(see above)	
1961	Gimnasia La Plata	16	(6)

International career
1947–1958	Argentina	5	(2)

Managerial career
- 1960: Estudiantes de La Plata
- * Club domestic league appearances and goals as of 14 October 2007

Ricardo Roberto Infante (21 June 1924 – 13 December 2008) was an Argentine football player and manager who played as a striker. He was the second highest scoring player in the history of Estudiantes de La Plata and the sixth highest scoring player in the professional era of the Primera División Argentina.

== Career ==
Infante made his professional debut in 1942 for Estudiantes, he scored his first goal for the club on 1 August 1943 in a 2–2 draw with Chacarita Juniors. Infante went on to score 180 goals for the club in 328 games.

One of Infante's notable moments came on 19 September 1948 in a game against Rosario Central, with Estudiantes already winning 2–0 Infante scored a goal with a right-footed rabona from 35 metres out. Many football specialists marked this moment as the origin of the rabona skill.

Infante left the club in 1953 after their relegation from the Primera División, he joined Club Atlético Huracán where he played until 1956. He then returned to Estudiantes for a second spell with the club.

In 1958 Infante was part of the Argentina squad that played in the 1958 FIFA World Cup.

In 1960 Estudiantes refused to renew his contract after he suffered a knee injury, prompting him to join fierce local rivals Gimnasia de La Plata. He retired later that year and went on to work as a youth coach in La Plata.

Infante currently occupies sixth place on the list of the Primera División Argentina all-time topscorers with 217 goals in 439 games.
