= Rubén Agüero =

Argentine footballer (born 1960)

Personal information
- Full name: Rubén José Agüero
- Date of birth: 20 February 1960 (age 66)
- Place of birth: Luján de Cuyo, Argentina
- Height: 1.86 m (6 ft 1 in)
- Position: Defender

Team information
- Current team: Defensores de Cambaceres (Manager)

Senior career*
Years	Team	Apps	(Gls)
1981–1982	Gimnasia de Mendoza	22	(0)
1983–1990	Estudiantes de La Plata	209	(14)
1990–1992	Lanús	60	(0)
1992	Deportivo Quito	15	(0)

International career
1984–1988	Argentina	6	(0)

Managerial career
- 1992–1993: Deportivo Español
- 2000: San Martín SJ
- 2001: Defensa y Justicia
- 2002: Godoy Cruz
- 2003: San Martín SJ
- 2003: Luján de Cuyo
- 2004: Alumni de Villa María
- 2005: Sarmiento
- 2005–2006: Defensa y Justicia
- 2006–2007: Huracán de Tres Arroyos
- 2008: Atlanta
- 2011–2012: Villa San Carlos
- 2012–2013: Textil Mandiyú
- 2013: San Telmo
- 2013–2014: Villa Mitre
- 2015: Tiro Federal
- 2019–2021: Defensores de Cambaceres
- * Club domestic league appearances and goals

Rubén José Agüero (born 20 February 1960) is an Argentine retired footballer who played as a defender, and is a manager. He competed in the men's tournament at the 1988 Summer Olympics.
