= Daniel Killer =

Argentine footballer

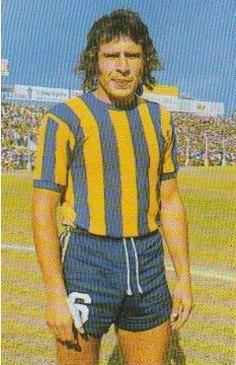
- Killer with Rosario Central in 1975

Personal information
- Full name: Daniel Pedro Killer
- Date of birth: 31 December 1949 (age 76)
- Place of birth: Rosario, Argentina
- Height: 1.78 m (5 ft 10 in)
- Position: Defender

Senior career*
Years	Team	Apps	(Gls)
1970–1976	Rosario Central	185	(18)
1977–1978	Racing Club	77	(4)
1979–1981	Newell's Old Boys	117	(3)
1982–1983	Vélez Sársfield	30	(0)
1984	Bucaramanga	8	(0)
1984	Estudiantes (RC)	4	(0)
1984–1986	Unión (SF)	45	(1)
1986–1987	Argentino (R)	0	(0)
Total		466	(26)

International career
1975–1978	Argentina	22	(3)
Medal record
Representing Argentina
FIFA World Cup
Winner	1978 Argentina	Team
- * Club domestic league appearances and goals

Daniel Pedro Killer (born 31 December 1949) is an Argentine former professional football defender who was part of the Argentina squad that won the 1978 FIFA World Cup. Daniel and his brother Mario were part of the Rosario Central team that won the Primera Division Argentina Nacional championship of 1973.

Killer started his career in 1970 with his home town club; Rosario Central where he was joined by his brother Mario in 1972.

Daniel's other clubs included Racing Club Vélez Sársfield, Estudiantes de Río Cuarto, Unión in Argentina. Killer also played for Rosario Central's fiercest local rivals, Newell's Old Boys.

Daniel Killer also had a short spell in Colombia with Bucaramanga, he finished his career in the lower leagues with Argentino de Rosario.

He owns and manages a small indoor soccer complex on the west side of his hometown.

== Honours ==
Rosario Central

- Primera Division Argentina: Nacional 1971, Nacional 1973

Argentina

- FIFA World Cup: 1978
