= José Daniel Ponce =

Argentine footballer

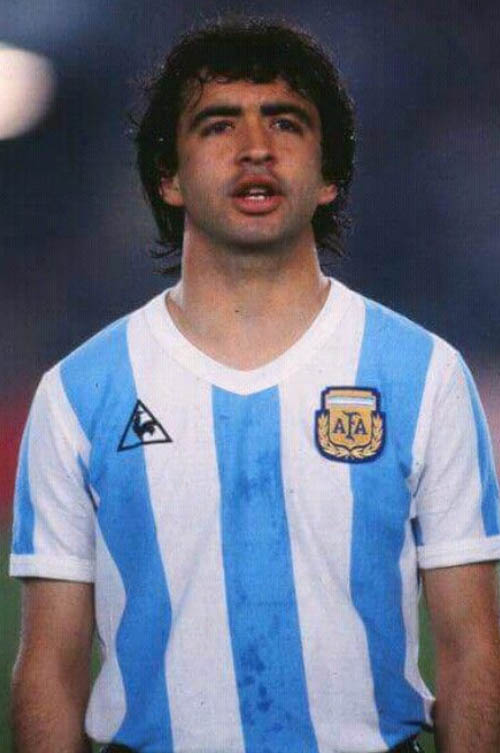
- Ponce with Argentina c. 1985

Personal information
- Date of birth: 26 June 1962 (age 64)
- Place of birth: Godoy Cruz, Argentina
- Height: 1.76 m (5 ft 9 in)
- Position: Midfielder

Youth career
- 1975–1979: Godoy Cruz
- 1979–1980: Estudiantes LP

Senior career*
Years	Team	Apps	(Gls)
1978–1979	Godoy Cruz		
1980–1985	Estudiantes LP	221	(42)
1984	→ Atlético Tucumán (loan)	5	(0)
1986–1987	Atlético Junior		
1988–1989	Estudiantes LP		
1989–1990	Boca Juniors	27	(4)
1990–1991	Nîmes	12	(1)
1991–1992	San Lorenzo	24	(1)
1993	Gimnasia y Tiro	8	(1)
1994	Douglas Haig		
1995	Independiente Rivadavia		
1995–1996	Coquimbo Unido		
1996	Everton		
1997	Huachipato		

International career
1983–1985	Argentina	21	(4)

Managerial career
- 2005–2006: Deportes Naval
- * Club domestic league appearances and goals as of 26 August 2007

José Daniel Ponce (born 26 June 1962) is an Argentine former professional footballer who played as a midfielder. He was part of the Estudiantes de La Plata team that won two back-to-back championships in 1982 and 1983.

== Career ==
Ponce was born in Godoy Cruz, Mendoza and was a product of Godoy Cruz youth system, also playing in the first team at the age of 16, making his debut on 8 October 1978. Then he was transferred and promoted to the first team of Estudiantes by coach Carlos Bilardo, when he shared the midfield with Miguel Ángel Russo, Alejandro Sabella and Marcelo Trobbiani. The team won two back-to-back titles and Ponce was called by Bilardo (now national coach) to the national team. His trademark were his precision free kicks, and his skill with the ball, both dribbling and passing, was often decisive in fast-break attack.

In 1983 Ponce was selected to join the Argentina squad for the Copa América 1983. He later took part in the process that led to Argentina's victory in the 1986 World Cup.

After Estudiantes, with a brief step in Atlético Tucumán in 1984, Ponce played for several clubs including Boca Juniors, San Lorenzo, Gimnasia y Tiro, Douglas Haig and Independiente Rivadavia in Argentina, Atlético Junior and Unión Magdalena in Colombia, Nîmes Olympique in France and Coquimbo Unido, Everton and Huachipato in Chile.

During his time at Boca the club won the Recopa Sudamericana and Copa Sudamericana titles in 1989. He made a total of 33 appearances for the club in all competitions, scoring five goals.

In 1995 while as a player in Coquimbo Unido, he was fired from the club after punching a youth team player in the face.

== Personal life ==
His parents were Juan Carlos, a chauffeur, and Marta. He has four younger brothers: Guillermo, Humberto, Juan Carlos and Eduardo. Since he was a child, he was nicknamed Bocha.

After his retirement from professional football, he made his home in Concepción, Chile. Then, he became a naturalized Chilean and involved in the miner market working in the North Zone of Chile. His Colombian wife, Milena, died of a tumor, days after delivering his first son; his two daughters are Chilean nationals. After a career as a coach in which his temper often got the best of him, Ponce has coached youth teams and has a successful sports-related business operation.

== Honours ==
Estudiantes

- Primera División Argentina: Metropolitano 1982, Nacional 1983

Boca Juniors

- Recopa Sudamericana: 1989
- Supercopa Sudamericana: 1989
