= Mario Killer =

Argentine footballer

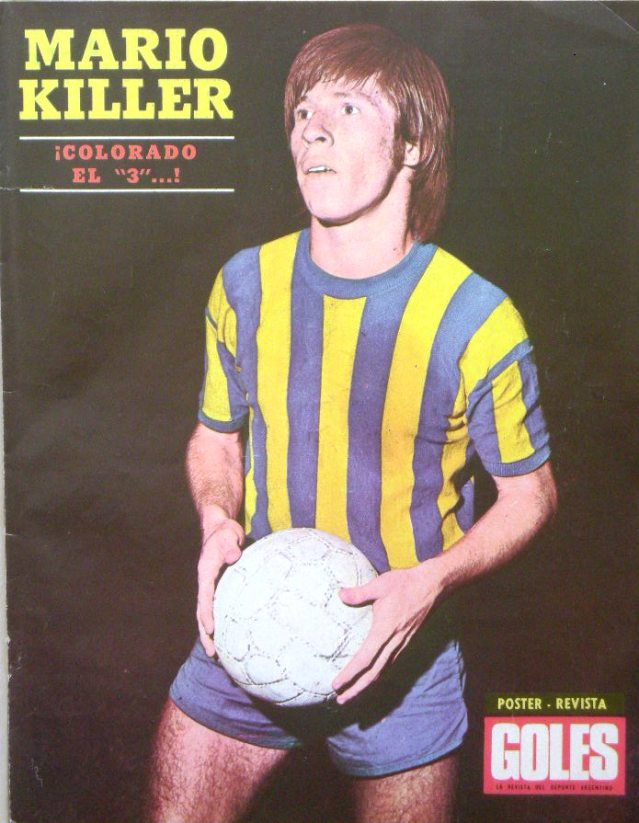
- Mario Killer in 1973

Personal information
- Full name: Mario Estanislao Killer Díez
- Date of birth: 15 August 1951 (age 75)
- Place of birth: Rosario, Santa Fe, Argentina
- Position: Defender

Senior career*
Years	Team	Apps	(Gls)
1971–75	Rosario Central	150	(2)
1975–78	Sporting de Gijón	70	(2)
1978–79	Real Betis	25	(0)
1979–80	Newell's Old Boys	10	(0)
1980–83	Independiente	169	(0)
1984	Rosario Central		
1985	Belgrano	6	(0)

International career
1972–75	Argentina	5	(2)
- * Club domestic league appearances and goals as of 27 May 2014

Mario Estanislao Killer Díez (born 15 August 1951) is an Argentine retired footballer. He played as defender in different clubs in Argentina and Spain and was part of the national team at the 1975 Copa América, alongside his brother Daniel.
