= Abel Herrera =

Argentine footballer

Personal information
- Full name: Abel Ernesto Herrera
- Date of birth: May 9, 1955 (age 71)
- Place of birth: Avellaneda, Argentina
- Height: 1.63 m (5 ft 4 in)
- Position: Left back

Senior career*
Years	Team	Apps	(Gls)
1972–1988	Estudiantes	467	(4)
- * Club domestic league appearances and goals as of 26 October 2007

Abel Ernesto Herrera (born May 9, 1955) is a former Argentine football left back. He holds the record for the most league appearances for Estudiantes de La Plata in the professional era with 467.

Nicknamed "Titi" Herrera was noted for his short stature and intense play, he played a total of 481 games for the La Plata club in all competitions. He is a one-club man having played his entire professional career for Estudiantes.

== Titles ==
Season	Team	Title
Metropolitano 1982	Estudiantes de La Plata	Primera División Argentina
Nacional 1983	Estudiantes de La Plata	Primera División Argentina
