= Carlos Bilardo =

Argentine footballer and manager (born 1938)

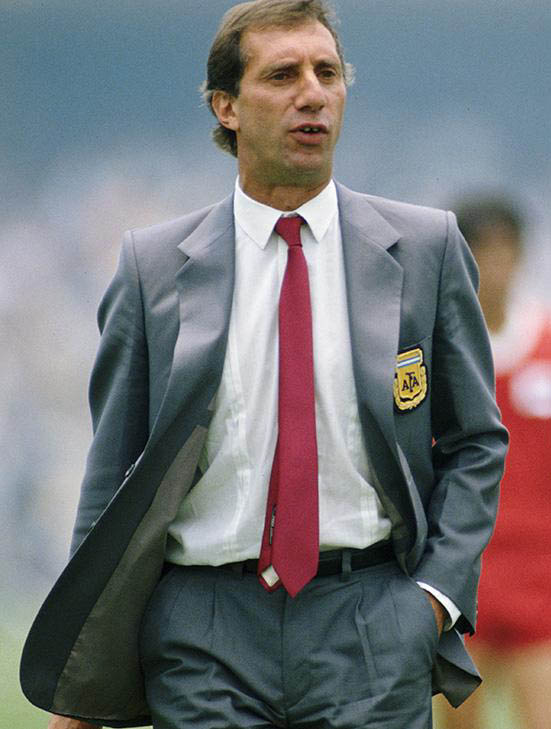
- Bilardo as Argentina's manager during the 1986 World Cup

Personal information
- Full name: Carlos Salvador Bilardo
- Date of birth: 16 March 1938 (age 88)
- Place of birth: Buenos Aires, Argentina
- Height: 1.74 m (5 ft 9 in)
- Position: Midfielder

Youth career
- San Lorenzo de Almagro

Senior career*
Years	Team	Apps	(Gls)
1958–1960	San Lorenzo	174	(12)
1961–1965	Deportivo Español	111	(39)
1965–1970	Estudiantes (LP)	175	(11)
Total		460	(62)

International career
1959	Argentina youth		

Managerial career
- 1971: Estudiantes (LP)
- 1973–1976: Estudiantes (LP)
- 1976–1978: Deportivo Cali
- 1979: San Lorenzo
- 1979–1981: Colombia
- 1982–1983: Estudiantes (LP)
- 1983–1990: Argentina
- 1992–1993: Sevilla FC
- 1996: Boca Juniors
- 1998: Guatemala
- 1999–2000: Libya
- 2003–2004: Estudiantes (LP)
Medal record
Men's football
Representing Argentina (as manager)
FIFA World Cup
Winner	1986 Mexico
Runner-up	1990 Italy
- * Club domestic league appearances and goals

Carlos Salvador Bilardo (born 16 March 1938) is an Argentine football player, and manager.

Bilardo achieved worldwide renown as a player with Estudiantes de La Plata in the 1960s, and as the manager of the Argentina side that won the 1986 FIFA World Cup and came close to retaining the title in 1990, where they reached the final. As manager of Argentina, he was renowned for successfully employing the 3–5–2 formation at the highest level; this formation had been in use for decades, but had never achieved mainstream status.

Bilardo is known by fans and the media as el narigón ("the big nosed one").

== Early life ==
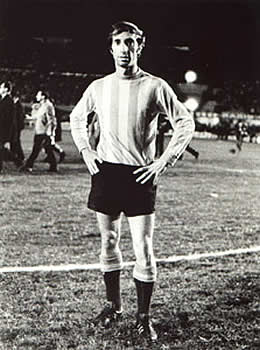
Bilardo as player

Bilardo was born in the Buenos Aires La Paternal neighbourhood to italian immigrants from Mazzarino. He was drawn to football from his childhood, but did not neglect study or work. On school vacations, he would get up before dawn to haul produce to the Abasto market in Buenos Aires.

Bilardo was a promising prospect in the youth divisions of major Buenos Aires club San Lorenzo de Almagro, and he was drafted to the junior Argentina national football team that obtained the 1959 Pan-American title and took part in the 1960 Summer Olympic Games in Rome.

In 1961, Bilardo was transferred to second-division side Deportivo Español, where he became the team's top scorer, but he slowly gravitated to the position of defensive midfielder. In parallel, he continued his studies in the Faculty of Medicine of the University of Buenos Aires.

== Club career ==
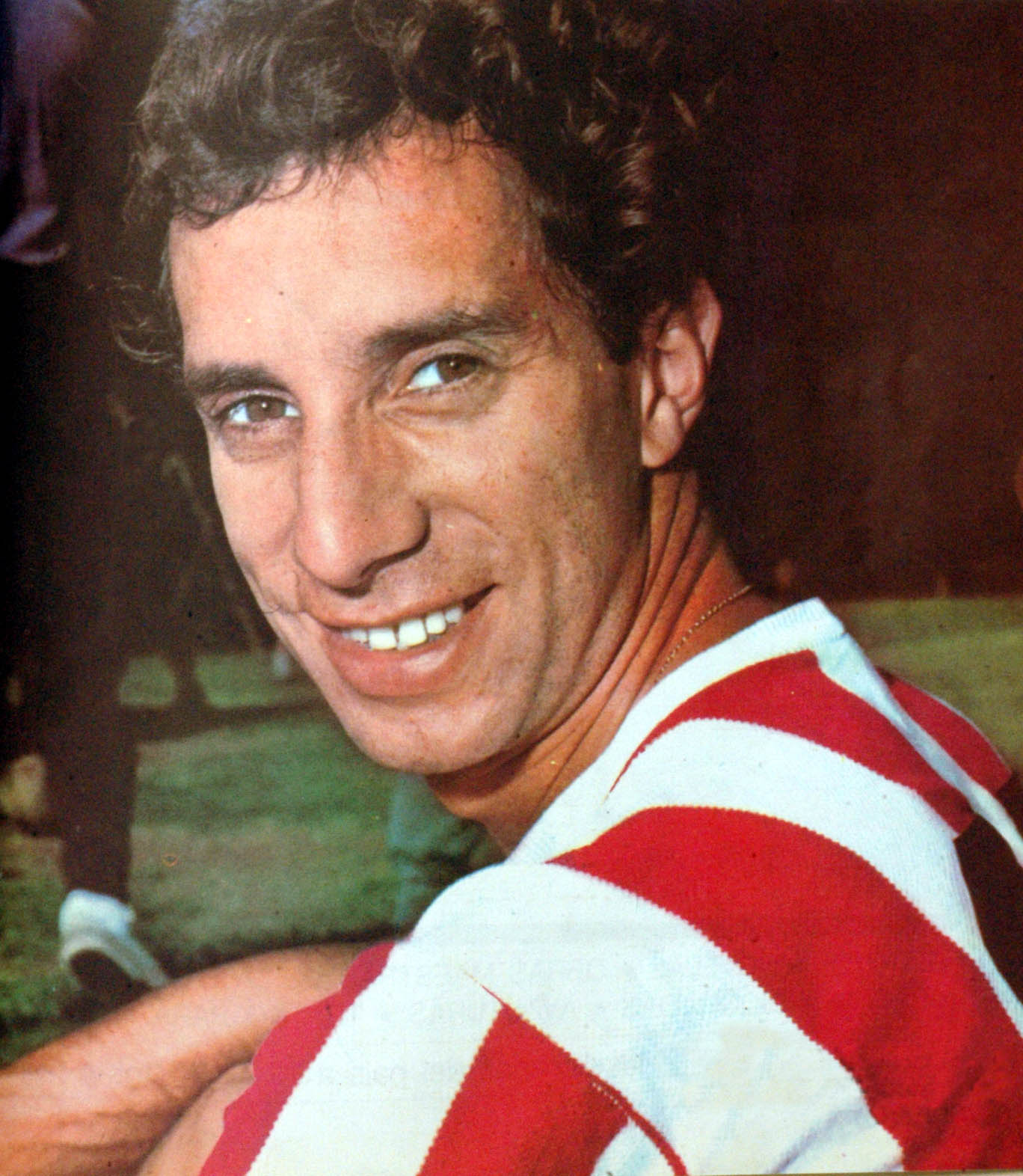
Bilardo while playing for Estudiantes de La Plata in 1968

In 1965, Bilardo was transferred to Estudiantes de La Plata, where manager Osvaldo Zubeldía built a team based on the killer youth divisions (la tercera que mata) and thought of using Bilardo as a more mature anchor for the midfield.

Bilardo became Estudiantes' inside-the-pitch tactician. Over a four-year span, the team won one Metropolitano title (1967), three Copa Libertadores titles (1968–1970, defeating Palmeiras, Nacional and Peñarol respectively at the finals) and one Intercontinental Cup in 1968 against Manchester United.

After graduating as a physician (together with fellow player Raúl Madero), Bilardo retired from play and accepted the job of Estudiantes coach in 1971. For the next years, he divided his time between managing, his family (he married in 1968 and fathered a daughter), and helping manage his father's furniture business. He even found time to research rectal cancer and practice as a gynecologist (Bilardo finally retired from the practice of medicine in 1976, feeling that being a physician requires a full-time commitment that he was unable to provide).

== Managerial career ==
After retiring as a player, Bilardo became Estudiantes LP coach in 1971. Estudiantes got to the final of the 1971 Copa Libertadores, which it lost to Nacional. In 1976, he became manager of Colombia's Deportivo Cali and after a 2-year stint he managed to get the squad into the Copa Libertadores Finals but once again failed to win the title. After failing in the 1978 Copa Libertadores Finals, Bilardo had a short stint in San Lorenzo and then became Colombia national team's trainer. When the team failed to qualify for the 1982 World Cup, he was fired from his position, and Estudiantes arranged for his return to Argentina.

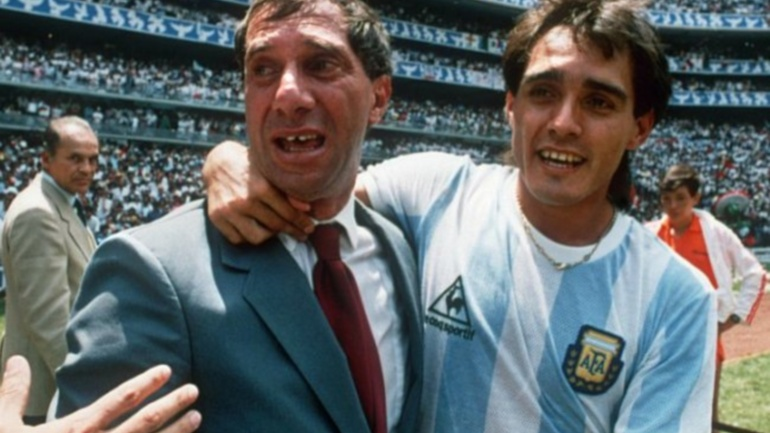
Bilardo with Pedro Pasculli in México 1986

The club was enjoying healthy finances due to the transfer of Patricio Hernández, and accommodated Bilardo's request for reinforcements. The team made the semi-finals of the 1982 Nacional and went on to win the same year's Metropolitano title.

Bilardo's scheme was based on Zubeldía's tactics, and its attacking might (fueled by players like Sabella, Trobbiani, Gottardi and Ponce) earned the attention of the media—and of the top brass of the Argentine Football Association, who offered him to manage the Argentina national team.

He held the post from 1983 until after the 1990 World Cup. Under his watch, Diego Maradona became the most dominant player of his age, and Argentina enjoyed their best international harvest, winning the 1986 edition and reaching the 1990 final.

Bilardo wrote a book called "Así Ganamos" ("How we won", Editorial Sudamericana Planeta) retelling the story of Argentina's 1986 FIFA World Cup win.

=== After 1990 ===
From 1990 and onwards, Bilardo alternated teaching and journalism stints with managing. He would reunite with Maradona in Sevilla FC and later in Boca Juniors, and have a brief term as the national coach of Libya and Guatemala in 1998.

Bilardo returned to Estudiantes LP for the 2003–04 season. In a publicised episode during that season, Bilardo sat next to the pitch during a game against Club Atlético River Plate and drank from a bottle of champagne. When confronted by media, he maintained that the bottle actually contained Gatorade; the contents of the bottle were analysed by a forensic lab, confirming Bilardo's version. Within that season, results improved, and several young players were promoted to the first team, including José Ernesto Sosa, who would later help Estudiantes become a contender; three years later, the team won the League title under coach Diego Simeone, and in 2009 Estudiantes won the Copa Libertadores again, with Bilardo attending the final in Belo Horizonte and receiving a gift from coach Sabella—his "lucky" beige coat.

Bilardo covered the 2006 FIFA World Cup in Germany for Argentine TV station Canal 13 as a commentator. In the aftermath of the tournament, Argentine manager José Pekerman renounced the post, and Bilardo's name was floated as a possible substitute. The job eventually went to Alfio Basile, who had earlier succeeded Bilardo as national coach after the 1990 World Cup.

Following the 2007 gubernatorial election, Bilardo was named Secretary of Sports of Buenos Aires province under governor Daniel Scioli.

=== General Manager ===
A new generation of Bilardo-influenced coaches has taken over many key positions in Argentine and South American football: Brown, Pumpido, Burruchaga, Batista, Russo, and Maradona.

When Maradona was named as national team coach in October 2008, Bilardo was tapped for the post of Argentina General Manager. After the designation, Bilardo agreed to quit his Secretary post.

== Honours ==
=== Player ===
San Lorenzo

- Argentine Primera División: 1959

Estudiantes (LP)

- Argentine Primera División: 1967 Metropolitano
- Copa Libertadores: 1968, 1969, 1970
- Intercontinental Cup: 1968
- Copa Interamericana: 1969

Argentina U23

- Pan American Games Gold Medal: 1959
- South American Pre-Olympic Tournament: 1960

=== Manager ===
Estudiantes (LP)

- Argentine Primera División: 1982 Metropolitano

Deportivo Cali

- Categoría Primera A runner-up: 1977, 1978
- Copa Libertadores runner-up: 1978

Argentina

- FIFA World Cup: 1986; runner-up: 1990
- Copa América Third place: 1989

Individual

- Guerin Sportivo Manager of the Year: 1986
- South American Coach of the Year: 1986, 1987
- Konex Award: 1990
- World Soccer 29th Greatest Manager of All Time: 2013
