= Estudiantes de La Plata =

Argentine professional football club

Estudiantes (LP)
- Full name: Club Estudiantes de La Plata
- Nicknames: Los Pincharratas (The Rat Stabbers), El León (The Lion)
- Founded: 4 August 1905; 121 years ago
- Ground: Estadio Jorge Luis Hirschi
- Capacity: 32,530
- President: Juan Sebastián Verón
- Manager: Alexander Medina
- League: Primera División
- 2026: 11th of 30
- Website: estudiantesdelaplata.com
Home colours	Away colours	Third colours

Club Estudiantes de La Plata (Spanish pronunciation: [kluβ estuˈðjantes ðe la ˈplata] lit. "Students of La Plata") is an Argentine professional sports club based in La Plata. The club's football team currently competes in the Primera División, where it has spent most of its history.

The club is a successful team in Argentina. In 1967, Estudiantes was the first team outside the traditional "big five" to win a professional league title. It has won four additional league titles and has had greater international success, having won six international titles. Estudiantes' international title championships are four Copa Libertadores (including three straight from 1968 to 1970), an Intercontinental Cup, and an Interamerican Cup.

The club was founded in 1905 when a group of players and fans decided to break away from Gimnasia de La Plata, which favored indoor sport rather than football. Matches between the two clubs are known as the Clásico Platense.

Other sports where Estudiantes competes are basketball, team handball, field hockey, golf, swimming, judo, and volleyball.

== History ==
=== First years ===
In 1905, a group of football players and fans in the city of La Plata decided to break away from Gimnasia y Esgrima, the major club in the city, since Gimnasia's management neglected football after the closure of their field on 13th and 71st streets.

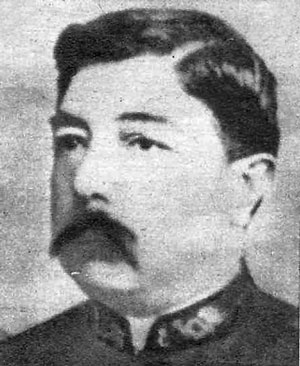
Miguel Gutiérrez, first president of the club

Thus, on 4 August 1905, in the shoe store "New York" on 7th Street, between 57 and 58 of the city of La Plata, the club was founded under the name "Club Atlético Estudiantes". Its first president, Miguel Gutiérrez, was elected on the very same night, when the club charter was drafted by card-carrying member #1, Alfredo Lartigue. Since its inception, the organization primarily was dedicated to football, but over the years the club expanded and incorporated basketball, handball, field hockey, tennis, swimming and golf, among others.

In those days, teams like Lomas A.C., Quilmes, Belgrano A.C., Estudiantil Porteño, San Isidro and Argentino de Quilmes, among others, faced each other in successive tournaments organized by the Argentine Football Association with Alumni (graduates of the Buenos Aires English High School) being one of the most successful.

On 28 February 1906 Estudiantes adopted a jersey design of striped red and white, in honor of Alumni, that had won ten championships between 1900 and 1911. However, during the early years, Estudiantes had to use a red shirt with a white stripe on the chest, because league authorities decided the uniform was too similar to Alumni's.

=== First title ===
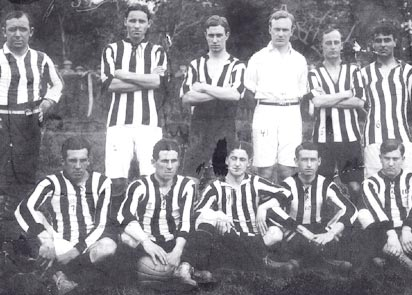
The 1913 Estudiantes team that won its first title in Primera División.

The first pitch of the club was located at the intersection of 19th and 53rd streets in La Plata (now Plaza Islas Malvinas), with the first match being played on 7 November 1905, when Estudiantes faced Nacional Juniors from Buenos Aires. A year later, Estudiantes enrolled in the Associación Amateurs de Football (AAF). The stadium on 1st Avenue opened on 25 December 1907.

Estudiantes' first achievement was the 1911 Primera B title which allowed the team to play at the top tier of Argentine football, Primera División. Just two years later Estudiantes won its first title in Primera, playing at the dissident Federación Argentina de Football (FAF). That season the team disputed 18 matches, winning 14 with only 1 lost and scoring 64 goals (with an average of 3,55 goals per match).

In 1914 Estudiantes made another great campaign but the team finished second to Porteño. 1919 saw Estudiantes finishing second to champion Boca Juniors although the Association put an end to the tournament with 14 fixtures still to be played. The Association alleged that "the championship took longer than expected" so it was suddenly finished.

In subsequent years, Estudiantes made irregular campaigns, in some cases finishing at the bottom of the table. Nevertheless, the team made a great performance in 1928 when finishing third to champion Huracán and Boca Juniors. The last year of amateur era saw Estudiantes being runner-up to Boca Juniors. The team totalized 56 points in 35 matches, with 27 won and 7 losses.

=== "The Professors" ===
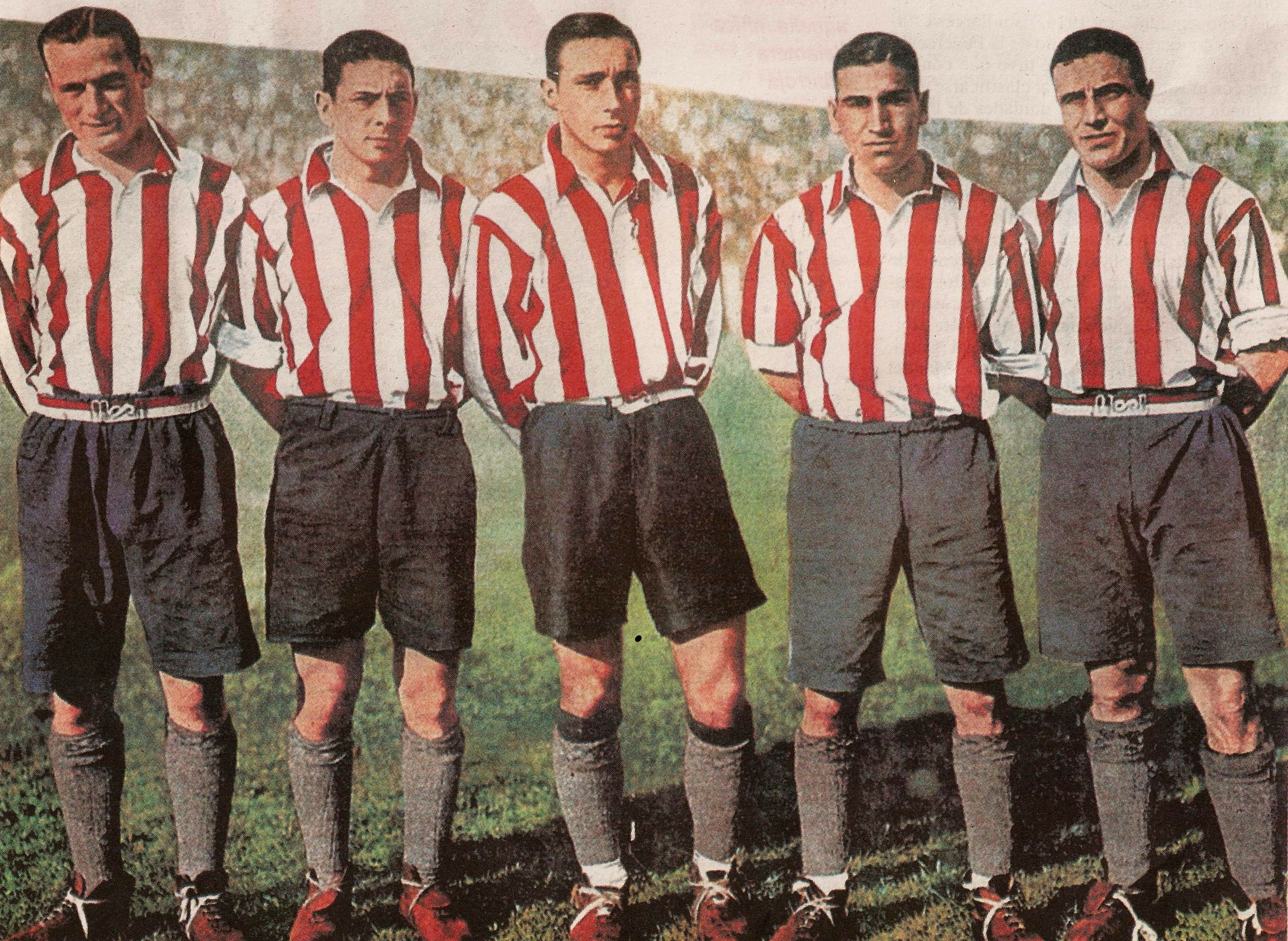
Los Profesores ("The Teachers"): Miguel Angel Lauri, Alejandro Scopelli, Alberto Zozaya, Manuel Ferreira and Enrique Guaita

When professionalism was adopted in Argentine football in 1931, Estudiantes had a famous offensive lineup: Miguel Ángel Lauri, Alejandro Scopelli, Alberto Zozaya, Manuel Ferreira and Enrique Guaita, known as Los Profesores ("The Professors"), and still regarded as one of Argentina's all-time finest. Alberto Zozaya scored the first goal of professional football in Argentina and was the top goalscorer of the first professional tournament. Ferreira played for the national team in the 1928 Olympic Games and the 1930 World Cup; Guaita and Scopelli played for Italian national team that won the 1934 FIFA World Cup. Saúl Calandra, the Sbarra brothers (Raúl and Roberto) and Armando Nery were feared defensive players.

In 1937, a pioneering lighting system was installed in the stadium, allowing night games to be played.

The 1940s saw the emergence of goalkeeper Gabriel Ogando, and players such as Walter Garcerón, Alberto Bouché, Juan Urriolabeitía, Ricardo Infante, Héctor Antonio, as well as the final seasons of striker Manuel Pelegrina, who remains Estudiantes' all-time top scorer with 221 goals. Following a confrontation with the Peronist government of Buenos Aires Province, the club's management was removed by authorities (allegedly for refusing to distribute copies of Eva Perón's book to club members) The government-appointed management disbanded the team: top scorers Infante and Pelegrina signed with Huracán. The decimated team was relegated in 1953, but after the return of Pelegrina (who tricked Huracán by becoming a free agent without the club's consent), Estudiantes was promoted the following year. The club was allowed to govern itself soon thereafter.

In the 1960s, Miguel Ignomiriello coached the Estudiantes under-19 team known as La Tercera que Mata ("The Killer Juveniles"), which would evolve, with a few acquisitions, into the team coached by Osvaldo Zubeldía that won the 1967 Metropolitano championship. With this title, Estudiantes became the first club outside the "big five" (Boca Juniors, River Plate, Racing Club, Independiente and San Lorenzo) to obtain a professional title. This opened the floodgates, and soon other "small" clubs would do likewise (Vélez Sársfield in 1968, Chacarita Juniors one year later, and soon other teams joined as well).

=== International success ===
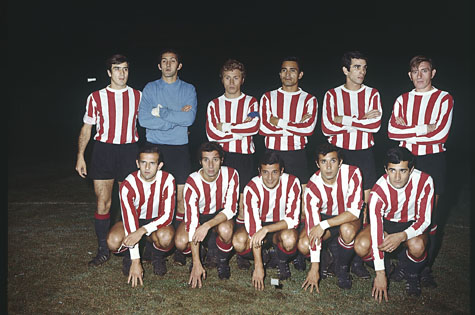
The team that won the 1968 Copa Libertadores, coached by Osvaldo Zubeldía.

Estudiantes went on to win the Copa Libertadores three years in a row (1968, 1969 and 1970), and the 1968 Intercontinental Cup against Manchester United. The latter game is still remembered for the violent behaviour of Estudiantes' players. They lost the Intercontinental title against A.C. Milan (1969) and Feyenoord (1970). Estudiantes won the maiden edition of the Copa Interamericana in a three-legged final against the reigning CONCACAF title-holders, Mexican club Toluca (the games were played in 1969, but official references call it the 1968 edition).

The last part of the Zubeldía era was marred by the antics of some players. Following a violent Intercontinental match against Milan, the entire team was arrested on orders from Argentine President Juan Carlos Onganía. In an unprecedented step, goalkeeper Alberto Poletti was suspended for life (he was later pardoned) and did time in jail, together with teammates Ramón Aguirre Suárez and Eduardo Luján Manera. Because of these events, it became a cliché to refer to Zubeldía's football as el antifútbol ("the anti-football"), because of its physical violence, and its frequent resort to timewasting tactics. The Times commented that Estudiantes is "one of the most despicable teams ever to emerge from South America."

Zubeldía hired former referees to lecture the team on regulations, so that his players would be able to exploit every loophole in the book. Also, he incorporated tactics that were unheard of at the time, such as playbook drills for free-kicks and corner kicks, the offside trap, and double-marking opponents.

The Zubeldía team counted two physicians among its stars: Carlos Bilardo and Raúl Madero graduated from the University of Buenos Aires Faculty of Medicine during their playing days. Juan Ramón Verón was a gifted player who could play left wing, but would also join the midfielders or attack from the right. He profited from the no-nonsense playing of Marcos Conigliaro, Juan Miguel Echecopar and Madero, and the tactical guidance provided by Bilardo. Right-back Eduardo Luján Manera was a very talented player, but suffered from repeated injuries and did not reach his full potential. Fullback Aguirre Suárez was noted for his often violent play, and so was Luis Medina.

After the 1970 season, Carlos Bilardo retired from play and got involved in his family's furniture business. As the team's fortunes were declining and relegation seemed a possibility, he was called by management in mid-1971 to coach the team. Under his guidance, Estudiantes lost the 1975 Nacional title in the last day of play and made it to the 1976 Copa Libertadores.

=== Carlos Bilardo era ===
In the ensuing years, Bilardo alternated between coaching Estudiantes and Colombian teams. He was briefly the coach of the Colombia national team, but was called again by Estudiantes in 1982. Soon after, the team won the 1982 Metropolitano championship. Under his successor Eduardo Luján Manera, also a member of the Zubeldía's team, Estudiantes won the 1983 Nacional tournament as well. Both wins were at the expense of a star-studded Independiente.

Those championship teams were anchored by a solid defense (Julián Camino on the right and Abel Ernesto Herrera on the left were also fearsome attackers, and José Luis Brown provided security as a sweeper), and also had three creative midfielders (José Daniel Ponce, Alejandro Sabella and Marcelo Trobbiani, with Miguel Ángel Russo to guard their backs) and two top-notch strikers (Hugo Gottardi and Guillermo Trama).

Bilardo went on to coach the Argentina national football team, that won the 1986 FIFA World Cup. The captain of Estudiantes' 1982 champions, José Luis Brown, scored the opening goal in the final match against West Germany. Four years later, Bilardo's Argentina reached the final of the 1990 FIFA World Cup. Madero was team physician for both events, and Ricardo Echevarría, also from Estudiantes, was fitness coach.

=== Decline and return to success ===
Estudiantes was relegated for the second time after the 1993–94 season, and again returned to the first division the very next season, which was the breakout year for Juan Sebastián Verón (son of former player Juan Ramón). In the ensuing years, the club had irregular results, and became known mostly as the breeding ground for strikers such as Martín Palermo, Luciano Galletti, Bernardo Romeo, Ernesto Farías and Mariano Pavone, as well as other quality players such as José Ernesto Sosa and Pablo Piatti.

Bilardo returned as coach in 2003, with new management bent on rebuilding the club in his winning ways. Some young players were promoted, such as Marcos Angeleri and José Ernesto Sosa. When Bilardo departed, the team remained a contender under coaches Reinaldo Merlo and Jorge Burruchaga. The team made history when it came from behind (0–3 at half-time) to win 4–3 against Peruvian Sporting Cristal in a Libertadores match played on 21 February 2006.

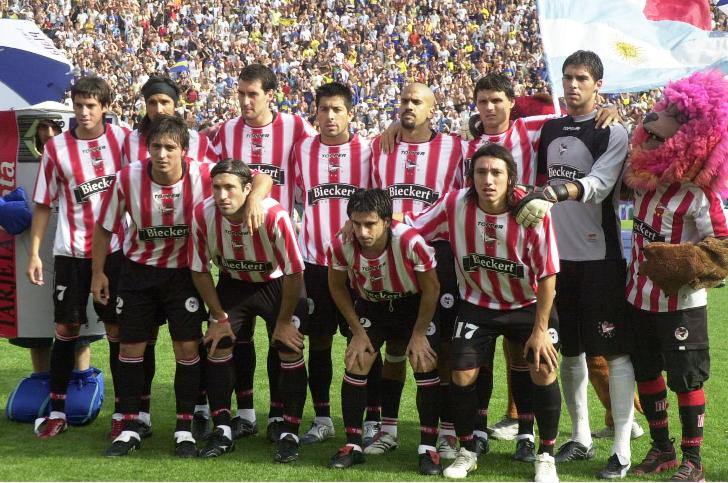
The team that won the 2006 Apertura defeating Boca Juniors in the final

On 18 May 2006, Burruchaga was replaced by another former Argentine international, Diego Simeone, who built the team around Juan Sebastián Verón, who returned to Estudiantes after 11 years. Simeone's team was eliminated by São Paulo in a penalty shoot-out in the quarter-finals of the 2006 Copa Libertadores, but went on to an impressive campaign in the local league during the 2006 Apertura. It amassed ten consecutive wins (tying the club record), including an unprecedented 7–0 win against Gimnasia in the La Plata derby, played 15 October 2006. Estudiantes finished the regular season tied for first place with Boca Juniors (per Argentine league rules, goal difference is not used to determine the champion). A winner-take-all final match was played on 13 December 2006. Estudiantes came from behind to defeat Boca Juniors 2–1, thus securing its first division title in 23 years. During this campaign, Estudiantes defeated all the "big five", allowed the fewest goals, and three of their players (Pavone, Verón and Braña) were ranked as the league's top three by sports diary Olé.

Simeone left the team after the 2007 Apertura, and was replaced by former S.S. Lazio teammate Roberto Sensini. After a weak finish in the 2008 Clausura, Sensini was replaced with Leonardo Astrada. Under his guidance, Estudiantes reached the final of the 2008 Copa Sudamericana, which it lost to Brazilian side SC Internacional. Shortly thereafter, a string of bad results caused Astrada's departure.

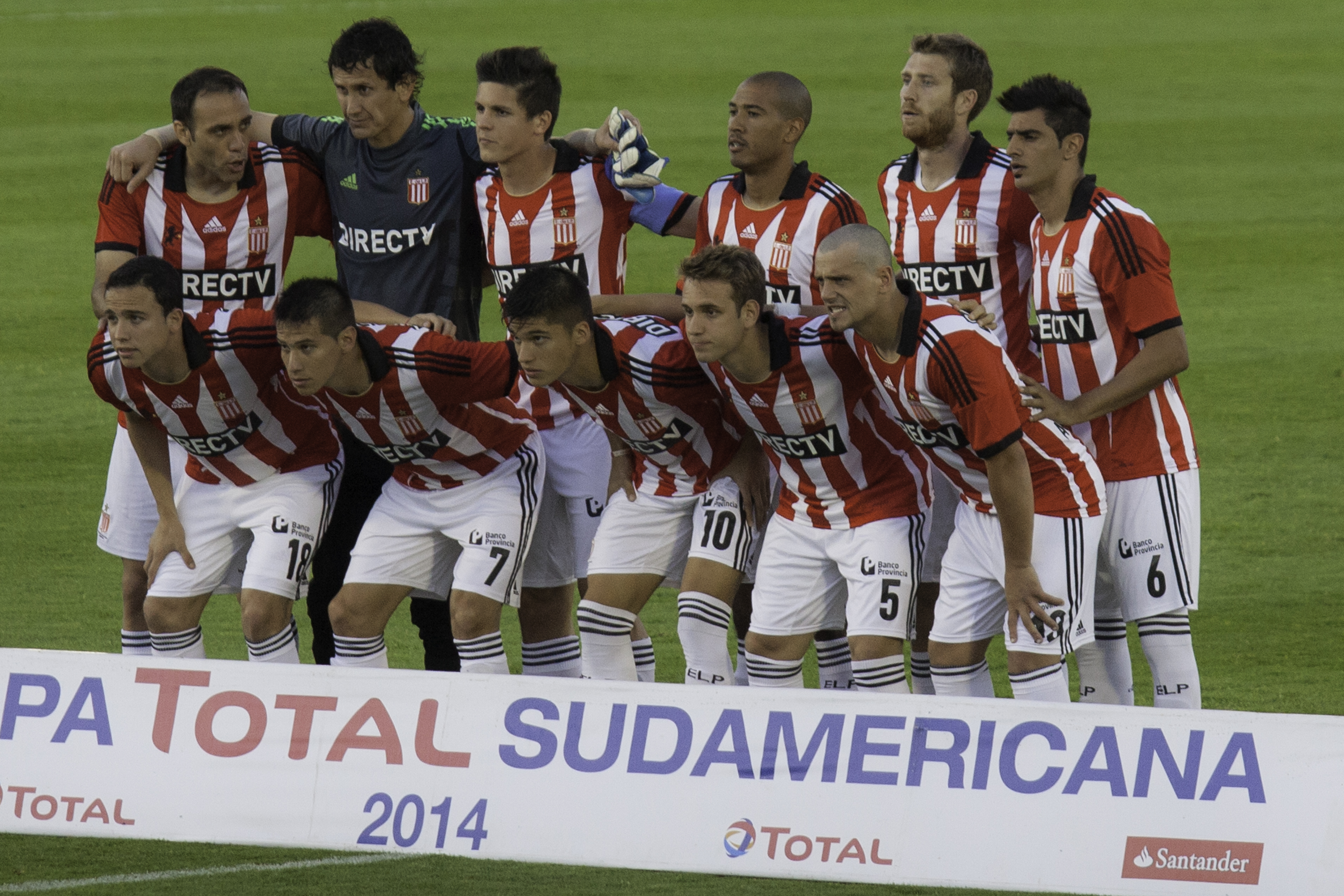
Estudiantes starting XI against Peñarol in the 2014 Copa Sudamericana

In March 2009, former player Alejandro Sabella became head coach, his first such engagement (his coaching experience was limited to being an assistant to Daniel Passarella). The team improved their standing in the local league and advanced to the final of the 2009 Copa Libertadores, winning 2–1 on aggregate over Cruzeiro after a goal-less draw in La Plata and an away win on 15 July 2009. Verón was chosen as the competition's most valuable player, and Mauro Boselli was its top goalscorer, with a decisive header in the final match. Thus, Estudiantes earned the right to play the 2009 FIFA Club World Cup in Abu Dhabi.

In that event, Estudiantes won their semifinal match against Pohang Steelers 2–1, and lost the final against FC Barcelona 2–1 in extra time, after a 1–1 tie in regulation time.

After the Club World Cup participation, Estudiantes finished second in the 2010 Clausura (with local favorite José Sosa playing on loan), and won the 2010 Apertura after a protracted battle against Vélez Sarsfield. The team was in transition following the departure of Sosa and the sales of Boselli, right back Marcos Angeleri, and other key players.

== Facilities ==
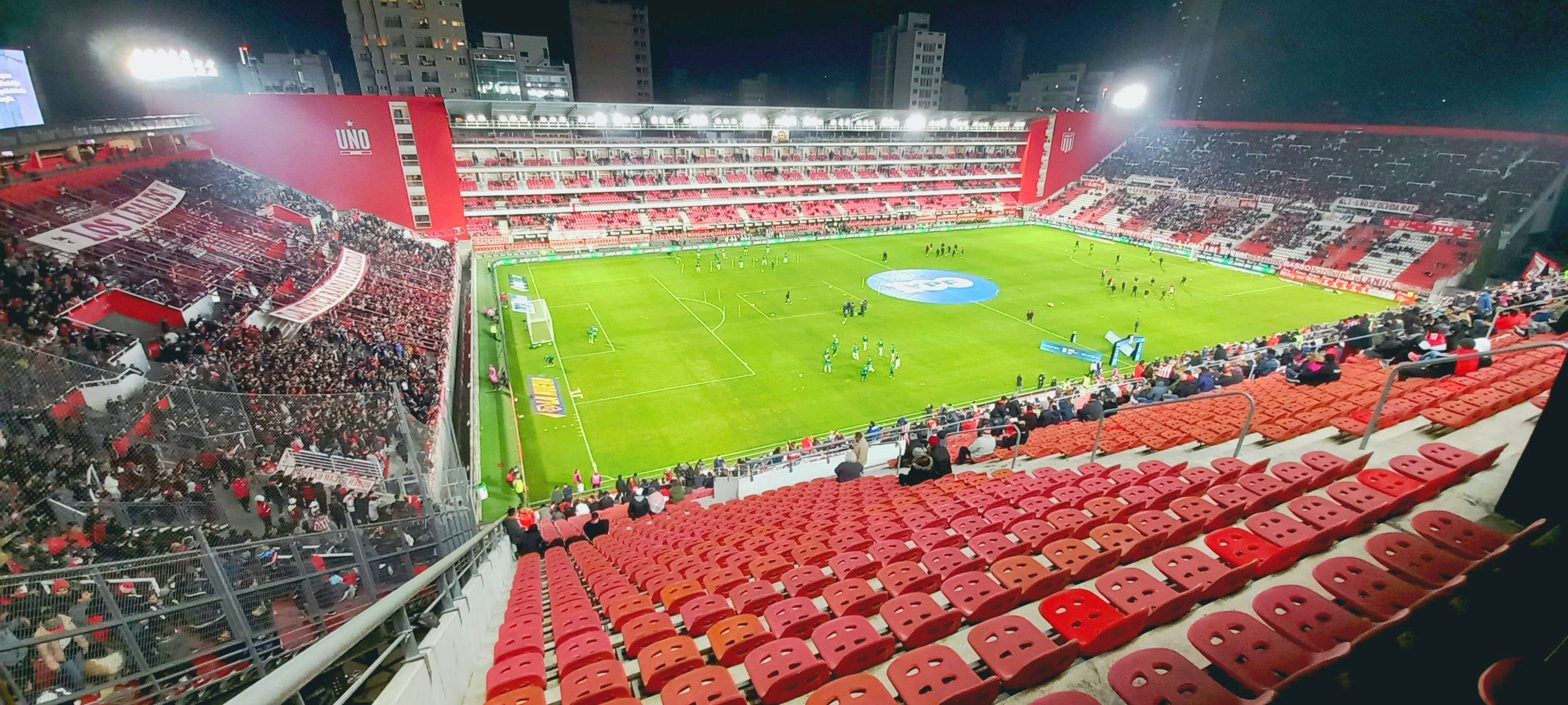
Jorge Luis Hirschi Stadium, moments before the start of the match between Estudiantes (La Plata) and Sarmiento (Junín), for the 2022 First Division Championship.

Jorge Luis Hirschi Stadium is located on 1st Avenue, between 55th and 57th Streets, in La Plata. It has a capacity for 32,530 people after the last addition of a new corner stand that was added in March 2022.

In its previous incarnation (1907 to 2005) the stadium had room for 23,000. The wooden stands behind the goal-lines were standing-room only. The stands next to the avenue were sitting-room, and were separated from the avenue by a row of tile trees. The opposite side was roofed and had the best seating arrangements. The noisiest fans used to occupy the 55th Street popular, while visiting fans were often directed to the 57th St. popular, opposite a technical high school (whose inconvenient location was responsible for the relatively small size of the pitch, at 105 x 68 m).

For some international games in the Zubeldía era, Estudiantes played in Boca Juniors' La Bombonera, noted for its intimidating acoustics.

With the erection of Estadio Ciudad de La Plata in the 1990s, both Estudiantes and Gimnasia decided initially against relocating their home games. However, Estudiantes's field was closed down in September 2005 because of new safety regulations which forbid standing-only wooden stands. This began a sequence of political infighting between the club and City Hall. Estudiantes played some home games in the nearby Gimnasia stadium, and later used Quilmes Atlético Club's Centenario field. There, Estudiantes made history with a come-from-behind 4–3 Libertadores win against Sporting Cristal.

In April 2006 a court decree allowed the re-opening of 1 y 57, but mayor Julio Alak intervened again to prevent this from happening. Renovation work on the stadium started in 2007, and met with opposition from several groups, notably the "Hoja de Tilo" NGO, who claims that the works would damage the environmental balance of the park behind the stadium.

While using the city stadium, Estudiantes earned five consecutive derby wins, and had a streak of 37 games undefeated in the local league (2007–2009). When roofing work began in August 2009 to install a new roof in the city stadium, Estudiantes moved once again to Quilmes, and alternated both locations until the stadium was re-opened in November 2019. The new stadium has LED lighting, playmaster surface, and features amenities such as shopping and restaurants underneath the stands.

Estudiantes' training grounds are located in the Country Club premises in City Bell, north of La Plata.

== Supporters ==
Within the La Plata area, Estudiantes was traditionally regarded as the club of the middle class, while rival side Gimnasia y Esgrima was identified with the working class. This characterization is not necessarily anchored in reality. While the two clubs have roughly the same pull in La Plata, Estudiantes has more of a nationwide following, especially after its international successes in the 1960s. There used to be much discussion about which club has the larger following, but Estudiantes seems to have pulled forward.

For several periods in the club's history, a group of supporters from Buenos Aires (los porteños) were a powerful element within the fan base. One of the fans from 1960s to the 1990s was Raúl Bernechea, known as el pelapapas (the "potato peeler") after his job as a kitchen hand; he was noted for lighting bonfires during games, juggling and performing other stunts .

Author Ernesto Sabato was an Estudiantes sympathizer, and was honored with a ceremony where he was awarded a No. 10 jersey. Political essayist Arturo Jauretche mentioned Estudiantes in one of his books.

Other noted fans include tennis player Juan Mónaco, actors Jorge and Federico D'Elía, philosopher Darío Sztajnszrajber, journalist Mauro Szeta, human rights activist Estela de Carlotto, filmmaker and politician Fernando Solanas, and sports journalist Osvaldo Príncipi.

In the 1983 presidential election, Estudiantes fans were, together with their peers from Vélez Sársfield, the first to voice their support for eventual winner Raúl Alfonsín in his bid against the Peronistas. The friendship with Vélez supporters has since vanished, especially after an Estudiantes win denied Vélez the 2003 championship.

Estudiantes is on friendly terms with several clubs from the South side of Greater Buenos Aires; especially Quilmes and Témperley. Platense, from the North side of Greater Buenos Aires, held a special place in the hearts of Estudiantes fans for some time, as it cemented Gimnasia's relegation in 1979.

Estudiantes is also friendly with the Uruguayan fan base of Peñarol, once their classic Libertadores rivals.

== Colors and badge ==
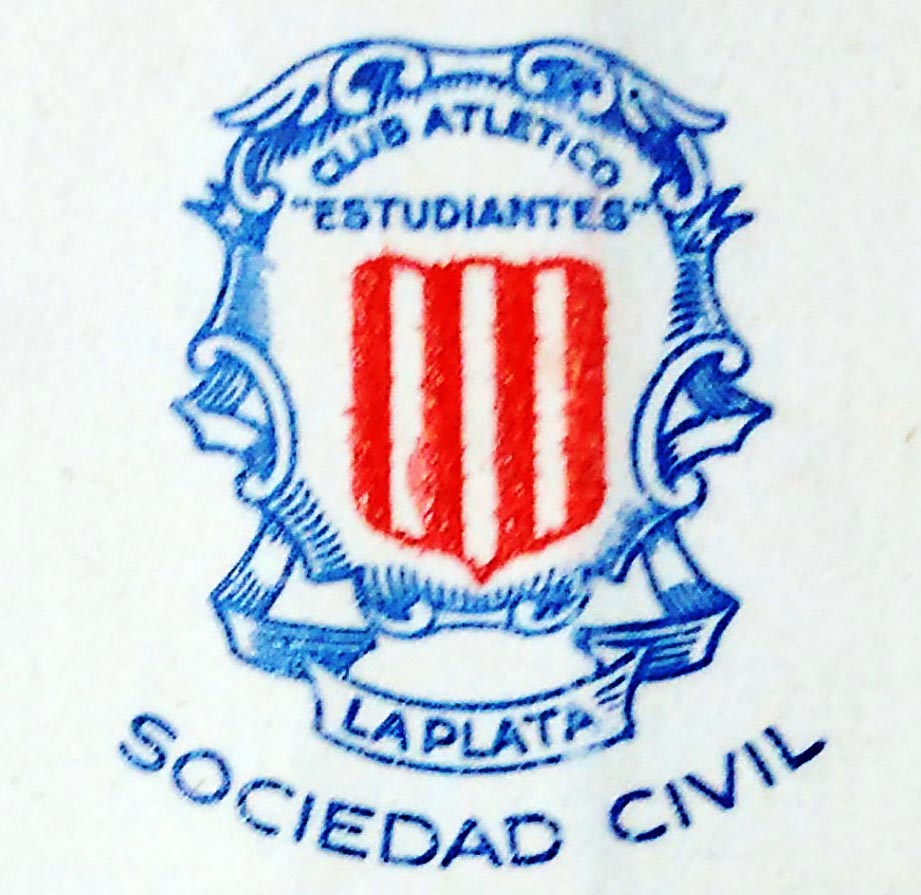
First logo of Estudiantes, c. 1905

The Estudiantes' colors (red and white) were originally taken from the shirt of legendary Alumni, the team which they admired. Apart from Estudiantes, other clubs (such as Unión de Santa Fe, Barracas Central, Talleres (RE), or Instituto (C)) would also adopt the red and white colors as a tribute to the Brown Brothers' team, the most winning club in Argentina until its dissolution in 1911.

Estudiantes also shares colors with Spanish side Athletic Bilbao, and during a period in the 1950s, both institutions shared a reputation for confronting the government (Bilbao as a Basque nationalist side against the Franco regime, and Estudiantes against Peronism). During these times, Bilbao donated a set of jerseys to Estudiantes. The relationship has been rekindled in the 2000s through Argentine expatriates and partisan blogs.

The traditional badge has undergone minor modifications in its history since its inception in 1920, sometimes alternating with a design that resembled a pennant (introduced in 1934) with an "E" at the center and oak leaves at background.

== Nicknames ==
The nickname pincharratas (rat stabbers), often shortened to pinchas, comes from the nickname of Felipe Montedónica, who spent much time chasing after rats in the La Plata market in the 1910s and 1920s, and hence was known as "el pincharratas". Pictures exist of Montedónica with some of the players, where his nickname is mentioned. Traditionally, the nickname is also associated with the laboratory work done by the many medicine students among the club's early members.

This nickname extends to the fans. It is common to hear fans say "soy del pincha" ("I am pincha").

Fans also call the team el león (the lion), el orgullo de la ciudad (the pride of the city), los capos de La Plata (the bosses of La Plata), and el único campeón de la ciudad (the only one champion of the city), because they are the only team in the city that has won an official tournament.

For several years, many chants incorporated the word Tricampeón (three-time champion) because of the Libertadores three-peat. After the 2009 Libertadores final, some of the newer lyrics use the word Tetracampeón (four-time champion).

== Players ==
=== Current squad ===
As of 15 September 2026

Note: Flags indicate national team as defined under FIFA eligibility rules; some limited exceptions apply. Players may hold more than one non-FIFA nationality.

No.	Pos.	Nation	Player
1	GK	ARG	Fabricio Iacovich
4	DF	ARG	Santiago Núñez
5	DF	ARG	Marcos Rojo
7	MF	ARG	José Sosa
8	MF	URU	Gabriel Neves
9	FW	ARG	Guido Carrillo (captain)
10	FW	URU	Tiago Palacios
12	GK	ARG	Rodrigo Borzone
13	DF	ARG	Gastón Benedetti
14	DF	ARG	Leandro González Pírez
15	DF	PAR	Santiago Arzamendia
16	GK	URU	Fernando Muslera
17	FW	ARG	Joaquín Tobio Burgos
18	FW	COL	Edwuin Cetré
19	FW	ARG	Adolfo Gaich
20	DF	ARG	Eric Meza

No.	Pos.	Nation	Player
21	MF	ARG	Ezequiel Piovi
22	MF	ARG	Alexis Castro
24	DF	ARG	Tomás Palacios (on loan from Inter Milan)
26	DF	ARG	Ramiro Funes Mori
27	FW	ARG	Lucas Alario
28	FW	ARG	Brian Aguirre (on loan from Boca Juniors)
29	FW	ARG	Fabricio Pérez
31	MF	ARG	Baltasar Rodríguez
32	FW	ARG	Joaquín Correa
34	MF	COL	Miguel Monsalve (on loan from Grêmio)
35	DF	ARG	Valente Pierani
36	DF	ARG	Joaquín Pereyra
39	MF	SYR	Jalil Elías
40	DF	ARG	Eros Mancuso (on loan from Fortaleza)
52	MF	ARG	Bautista Kociubinski

=== Reserve squad ===
Note: Flags indicate national team as defined under FIFA eligibility rules; some limited exceptions apply. Players may hold more than one non-FIFA nationality.

No.	Pos.	Nation	Player
3	DF	ARG	Máximo Desábato
23	FW	ARG	Franco Domínguez
25	FW	ARG	Ciro Spalletta
30	GK	ARG	Tiziano Van Der Tuin
33	DF	ARG	Faustino Messina
37	DF	ARG	Matías Magdaleno
38	MF	ARG	Franco Basualdo
39	MF	ARG	Lucas Cornejo
41	FW	ARG	Benjamín Sagüés Barreiro
42	MF	ARG	Martín Naser
43	FW	ARG	Santino Crego

No.	Pos.	Nation	Player
44	FW	ARG	Juan Fernández Soler
45	DF	ARG	Jorge Georgieff
46	MF	ARG	Bemjamín Maliani
47	FW	ARG	Enzo Sanabria
48	FW	ARG	Thiago Serrano
49	FW	ARG	Francisco Silvetti
50	MF	ARG	Agustín Traina
51	FW	ARG	Bautista Molinari
—	DF	ARG	Santiago Flores
—	MF	ARG	Galo Galarza
—	MF	ARG	Thiago González

==== Out on loan ====
Note: Flags indicate national team as defined under FIFA eligibility rules; some limited exceptions apply. Players may hold more than one non-FIFA nationality.

No.	Pos.	Nation	Player
2	DF	ARG	Facundo Rodríguez (at CSKA Sofia until 30 June 2027)
11	MF	ARG	Facundo Farías (at San Lorenzo until 30 June 2027)
12	GK	ARG	Matías Mansilla (at Unión Santa Fe until 31 December 2026)
18	DF	ARG	Juan Cruz Guasone (at Cerro until 31 December 2026)
19	FW	COL	Alexis Manyoma (at Deportivo Cali until 30 June 227)
20	FW	ARG	Matías Godoy (at Aldosivi until 31 December 2026)
21	FW	ARG	Ezequiel Naya (at Central Córdoba until 31 December 2026)

No.	Pos.	Nation	Player
23	MF	ARG	Gonzalo Piñeiro (at Kalamata until 30 June 2027)
25	GK	ARG	Juan Pablo Zozaya (at Magallanes until 31 December 2026)
28	FW	ARG	Agustín Palavecino (at Aldosivi until 31 December 2026)
29	MF	ARG	Axel Atum (at Racing de Montevideo until 31 December 2026)
—	DF	ARG	Emanuel Dall'Aglio (at Cerrito until 31 December 2026)
—	FW	ARG	Luciano Giménez (at Platense until 30 June 2027)

=== Most goals scored ===
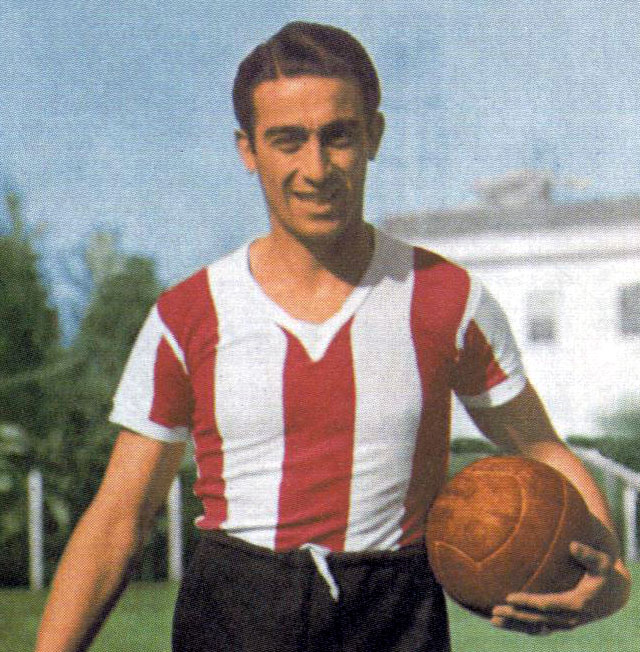
Manuel Pelegrina holds both records for Estudiantes LP, all-time top scorer and most appearances with the team

No.	Player	Pos.	Tenure	Goals
1	(Argentina) Manuel Pelegrina	FW	1938–52, 1954–56	235
2	(Argentina) Ricardo Infante	FW	1942–52, 1957–60	180
3	(Argentina) Alberto Zozaya	FW	1930–39	144
4	(Argentina) Hugo Gottardi	FW	1976–83	125
5	(Argentina) Ernesto Farías	FW	1997–2004	95

=== Most appearances ===
No.	Player	Pos.	Tenure	Match.
1	(Argentina) Manuel Pelegrina	FW	1938–1952, 1954–56	489
2	(Argentina) Abel Herrera	DF	1972–88	467
3	(Argentina) Leandro Desábato	DF	1997–2001, 2004, 2007–18	423
4	(Argentina) Miguel Ángel Russo	MF	1975–88	418
5	(Argentina) Oscar Pezzano	MF	1970–71, 1973–80	349

=== Current coaching staff ===
Position	Staff
Head coach	(Uruguay) Alexander Medina
Assistant coach	(Uruguay) Fernando Machado
Assistant coach	(Uruguay) Maximiliano Dornell
Assistant coach	(Argentina) Sebastián Grazzini
Goalkeeping coach	(Argentina) Leandro Cortizo
Fitness coach	(Argentina) Bruno Militano
Fitness coach	(Argentina) Martín Frattini
Fitness coach	(Argentina) Martín Bocchino
Fitness coach	(Argentina) Ezequiel San Andrés
Video analyst	(Argentina) Christian Serrano
Video analyst	(Argentina) Bruno Olivetto
Video analyst	(Argentina) Santiago Nieto
Doctor	(Argentina) Hugo Montenegro
Doctor	(Argentina) Gustavo Ermili
Kinesiologist	(Argentina) Dario Gabbi
Kinesiologist	(Argentina) Juan Cattelan
Kinesiologist	(Argentina) Bautista Ibañez
Masseur	(Argentina) Federico Flores
Nutritionist	(Argentina) Rocco Bellingeri
Administrative/Delegate	(Argentina) Leonardo Mansilla
Kit man	(Argentina) Ruben Mazzina
Kit man	(Argentina) Rosalino Bareiro
Kit man	(Argentina) Federico Mazzina
Kit man	(Argentina) Julian Raimundo

Last updated: 25 April 2025
Source: Cuerpo técnico

=== Top goalscorers in Primera ===
Players who have been top scorers in Primera División seasons:

Seas.	Player	Goals	Match.
1931	Alberto Zozaya	33	34
1973 Met	Ignacio Peña	17	32
1977 Nac	Alfredo Letanú	13	16
1979 Met	Sergio Fortunato	14	19
1995 Ap	José Luis Calderón	13	18
2003 Ap	Ernesto Farías	12	16
2005 Cl	Mariano Pavone	16	19
2010 Cl	Mauro Boselli	13	14

== Managers ==
Several managers associated with the club have significantly impacted Argentine and international football. This group includes Guillermo Stábile, Osvaldo Zubeldía, and Carlos Bilardo, as well as contemporary figures such as Diego Simeone and Alejandro Sabella, all of whom achieved notable domestic or international success with the club or the Argentine national team.

- (Argentina) Guillermo Stábile (1940–1941)
- (Argentina) Alberto Zozaya (1945–1949)
- (Scotland) Neil McBain (1949–1951)
- (Argentina) Mario Fortunato (1954–1955)
- (Argentina) Miguel Ángel Lauri (1955)
- (Argentina) Manuel Ferreira (1955)
- (Argentina) Saúl Ongaro (1956)
- (Argentina) Ricardo Infante (1960)
- (Argentina) Saúl Ongaro (1962–1963)
- (Argentina) Carlos Aldabe (1963–1964)
- (Argentina) Osvaldo Zubeldía (Jan 1965 – Dec 1970)
- (Argentina) Carlos Bilardo (1971)
- (Argentina) José María Silvero (1972)
- (Argentina) Omar Sívori (1972)
- (Argentina) Carlos Bilardo (1973–1976)
- (Argentina) Eduardo Luján Manera (1977)
- (Spain) Héctor Rial (1978)
- (Argentina) José Yudica (1980)
- (Argentina) Carlos Pachamé (1981)
- (Argentina) Carlos Bilardo (1982–1983)
- (Argentina) Eduardo Luján Manera (1983–1985)
- (Argentina) Humberto Zuccarelli (July 1985 – Jun 1986)
- (Argentina) Eduardo Luján Manera (1986)
- (Argentina) José Ramos Delgado (1987)
- (Argentina) Oscar Malbernat (1987–1988)
- (Argentina) Eduardo Solari (1988–1990)
- (Argentina) Humberto Zuccarelli (Jul 1990 – 1991)
- (Argentina) Eduardo Flores (1991–1992)
- (Uruguay) Luis Garisto (1992–1993)
- (Argentina) Enzo Trossero (1993–1994)
- (Argentina) Héctor Vargas (1994)
- (Argentina) Miguel Ángel Russo & (Argentina) E. Luján Manera (1994–1995)
- (Argentina) Marcos Conigliaro (1995)
- (Argentina) Patricio Hernández (1998–1999)
- (Argentina) Néstor Craviotto (2000–2002)
- (Argentina) Oscar Malbernat (2002–2003)
- (Argentina) Carlos Pachamé (2003)
- (Argentina) Carlos Bilardo (2003–2004)
- (Argentina) Reinaldo Merlo (Jul 2004 – Apr 2005)
- (Argentina) Jorge Burruchaga (Jul 2005 – Jun 2006)
- (Argentina) Diego Simeone (May 2006 − Dec 2007)
- (Argentina) Roberto Sensini (Jan 2008 – Sep 2008)
- (Argentina) Leonardo Astrada (Sep 2008 – Mar 2009)
- (Argentina) Alejandro Sabella (Mar 2009 − Feb 2011)
- (Argentina) Eduardo Berizzo (Feb 2011 – May 2011)
- (Argentina) Miguel Ángel Russo (Jul 2011 − Nov 2011)
- (Argentina) Juan Manuel Azconzábal (Nov 2011 – Apr 2012)
- (Argentina) Diego Cagna (Jul 2012 − Apr 2013)
- (Argentina) Mauricio Pellegrino (Apr 2013 – Apr 2015)
- (Argentina) Gabriel Milito (Apr 2015 – Dec 2015)
- (Argentina) Nelson Vivas (Dec 2015 – Jun 2017)
- (Uruguay) Gustavo Matosas (Jun 2017 – Sep 2017)
- (Argentina) Lucas Bernardi (Sep 2017 – May 2018)
- (Argentina) Leandro Benítez (Jun 2018 – Feb 2019)
- (Argentina) Gabriel Milito (11 Mar 2019–5 Mar 2020)
- (Argentina) Leandro Desábato & (Argentina) Rodrigo Braña (2020 (interims))
- (Argentina) Pablo Quatrocchi (24 Dec 2020 – 11 Jan 2021)
- (Argentina) Ricardo Zielinski (12 Jan 2021 – 1 Oct 2022)
- (Argentina) Abel Balbo (1 Jan 2023 – 5 Mar 2023)
- (Argentina) Eduardo Domínguez (6 Mar 2023 – 22 Feb 2026)
- (Uruguay) Alexander Medina (23 Feb 2026 – present)

== Honours ==
=== Senior titles ===
Keys

- Record
- ^{(s)} Shared record

Type	Competition	Titles	Winning years
National (League)	Primera División	7	1913 FAF, 1967 Metropolitano, 1982 Metropolitano, 1983 Nacional, 2006 Apertura, 2010 Apertura, 2025 Clausura
National (Cups)	Copa de la Liga Profesional	1	2024
National (Cups)	Copa Argentina	1	2023
National (Cups)	Supercopa Argentina	1	2025
National (Cups)	Trofeo de Campeones (LPF)	2^{(s)}	2024, 2025
National (Cups)	Copa Gral. P. Ramírez	1^{(s)}	1945
National (Cups)	Copa Adrián C. Escobar	1	1944
International	Copa Libertadores	4	1968, 1969, 1970, 2009
International	Copa Interamericana	1	1968
Worldwide	Intercontinental Cup	1	1968

=== Other titles ===
Titles won in lower divisions:

- Primera B Nacional: 1994–95
- Primera B: 1954
- División Intermedia: 1911

== See also ==
- List of world champion football clubs
