= Eduardo Manera =

Argentine footballer and manager

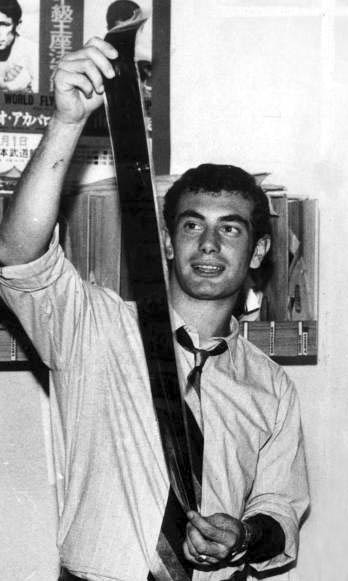
- Manera in 1967

Personal information
- Full name: Eduardo Luján Manera
- Date of birth: August 22, 1944
- Place of birth: Concepción del Uruguay, Argentina
- Date of death: August 15, 2000 (Aged 55)
- Position: Right back

Senior career*
Years	Team	Apps	(Gls)
1963–1970	Estudiantes	118	(13)
1971	Avignon	14	(1)

International career
	Argentina	3	(0)

Managerial career
- 1975: Los Andes
- 1976: Estudiantes (BA)
- 1977: Estudiantes
- 1978: Once Caldas
- 1979–1980: Deportivo Cali
- 1981: Atlanta
- 1982: Platense
- 1983–1985: Estudiamtes
- 1985: Santa Fe
- 1986: Estudiantes
- 1988–1989: Paraguay
- 1990: Necaxa
- 1991: Talleres
- 1992: Vélez Sársfield
- 1993: Newell's Old Boys
- 1994–1995: Estudiantes
- 1996: Universitario
- 1997: Deportivo Español
- 1998: Vélez Sársfield
- * Club domestic league appearances and goals

Eduardo Luján Manera (22 August 1944 – 15 August 2000) was an Argentine football defender, and a manager who won the Argentine Primera with Estudiantes de La Plata as player and manager. He was banned from football for 20 games by the Argentine Football Association and sent to prison for a month following assaults on AC Milan players in the 1969 Intercontinental Cup final.

== Titles ==
As a player

- Metropolitano in 1967 with Estudiantes de la Plata
- Copa Libertadores de América (3): 1968–1969–1970
- Copa Intercontinental : 1968
- Copa Interamericana : 1969

As a coach

- Nacional in 1983 with Estudiantes de la Plata
- Primera B Nacional' in 1995 with Estudiantes de La Plata
