= Miguel Ángel Russo =

Argentine football player and manager (1956–2025)

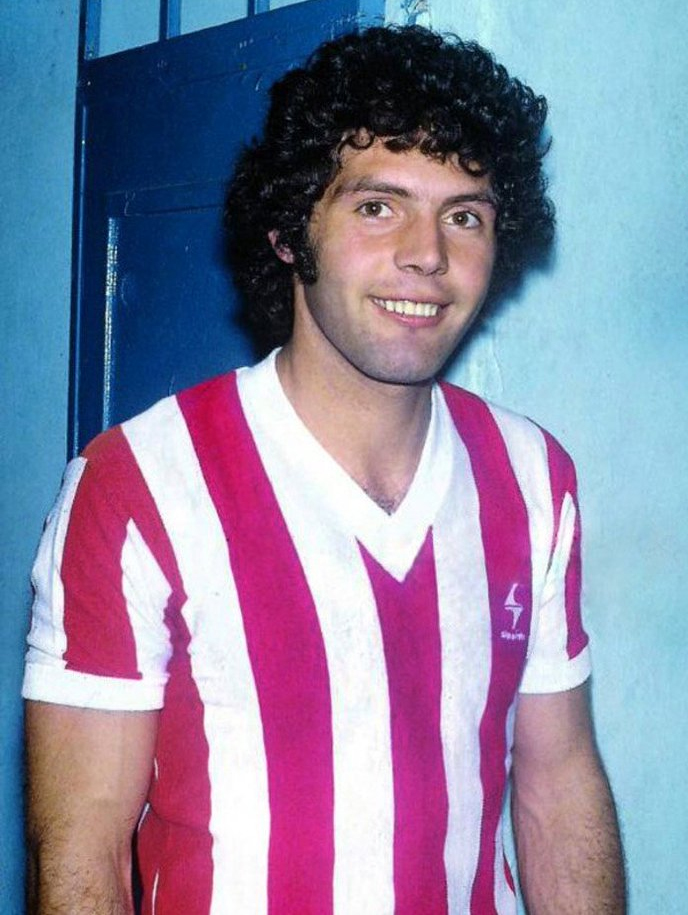
- Russo with Estudiantes LP in 1981

Personal information
- Full name: Miguel Ángel Russo
- Date of birth: 9 April 1956
- Place of birth: Valentín Alsina, Argentina
- Date of death: 8 October 2025 (aged 69)
- Place of death: Buenos Aires, Argentina
- Position: Defensive midfielder

Youth career
- Estudiantes (LP)

Senior career*
Years	Team	Apps	(Gls)
1975–1988	Estudiantes LP	435	(11)

International career
1983–1985	Argentina	17	(1)

Managerial career
- 1989–1994: Lanús
- 1994–1995: Estudiantes LP
- 1996: Universidad de Chile
- 1997–1998: Rosario Central
- 1998–1999: Salamanca
- 1999: Colón
- 1999–2000: Lanús
- 2000–2001: Los Andes
- 2001–2002: Morelia
- 2002–2004: Rosario Central
- 2005–2006: Vélez Sarsfield
- 2007: Boca Juniors
- 2008–2009: San Lorenzo
- 2009: Rosario Central
- 2010–2011: Racing Club
- 2011: Estudiantes LP
- 2012–2014: Rosario Central
- 2015: Vélez Sarsfield
- 2016–2018: Millonarios
- 2019: Alianza Lima
- 2019: Cerro Porteño
- 2020–2021: Boca Juniors
- 2021–2022: Al-Nassr
- 2023–2024: Rosario Central
- 2024–2025: San Lorenzo
- 2025: Boca Juniors
- * Club domestic league appearances and goals

Miguel Ángel Russo (9 April 1956 – 8 October 2025) was an Argentine professional football player and manager who played as a defensive midfielder. As a player, Russo spent his entire career in Estudiantes de La Plata. As a manager, he coached for over 1,000 matches over more than 30 years of his career.

Russo made his professional debut in Estudiantes LP in 1975, playing for fourteen consecutive seasons until his retirement in 1988. He played 435 official matches with Estudiantes, also winning two Primera División titles. Russo also played 17 matches for the Argentina national team.

== Playing career ==
=== Club career ===
Russo was a one-club man; he played his entire career for Estudiantes de La Plata, from 1975 to his retirement in 1988. A defensive midfielder, Russo was a staple of the team that won two back-to-back championships in the 1982 Metropolitano and 1983 Nacional.

=== International career ===
Although Russo was called on by Argentina national team coach Carlos Bilardo to play in the 1986 FIFA World Cup qualifiers, a string of minor injuries prevented him from travelling to the main event in Mexico, which Argentina ultimately won.

== Coaching career ==
Russo's career as a coach included stints at Estudiantes de La Plata and Lanús (both of which he helped promote), and other sides in Argentina, Mexico, Chile, and Spain.

In June 2005, he won the 2005 Clausura tournament with Vélez Sarsfield, his first title as a coach in the Argentine top division. On 15 December 2006, he was signed by Boca Juniors to replace Ricardo La Volpe.

With Russo at the helm, Boca Juniors took second place in the 2007 Clausura tournament and won the 2007 Copa Libertadores. After Boca, Russo managed San Lorenzo between 2008 and 2009. After losing to San Luis Potosí and being eliminated from the Copa Libertadores, the coach announced his decision to resign on 9 April 2009.

On 15 April 2009, Russo joined Rosario Central, replacing Reinaldo Merlo and just two months later, on 14 July 2009, the coach quit the team.

The former midfielder then managed Racing Club between 2010 and 2011. On 21 June 2011, less than a week after resigning as coach of Racing Club, Russo signed a contract to again coach his former club, Estudiantes de La Plata, marking his second stint as an Estudiantes coach, having done so in 1994.

On 6 November 2011, after Estudiantes was defeated 3–1 by Godoy Cruz and in turn fell to last place with only 10 points in 14 games, Russo resigned as manager, less than five months after having assumed charge. He then had a successful stint at Rosario Central, winning the 2012–13 Primera B Nacional and reaching the final of the 2013–14 Copa Argentina.

In 2015, Russo agreed to become manager of Vélez Sarsfield, his second spell at the club.

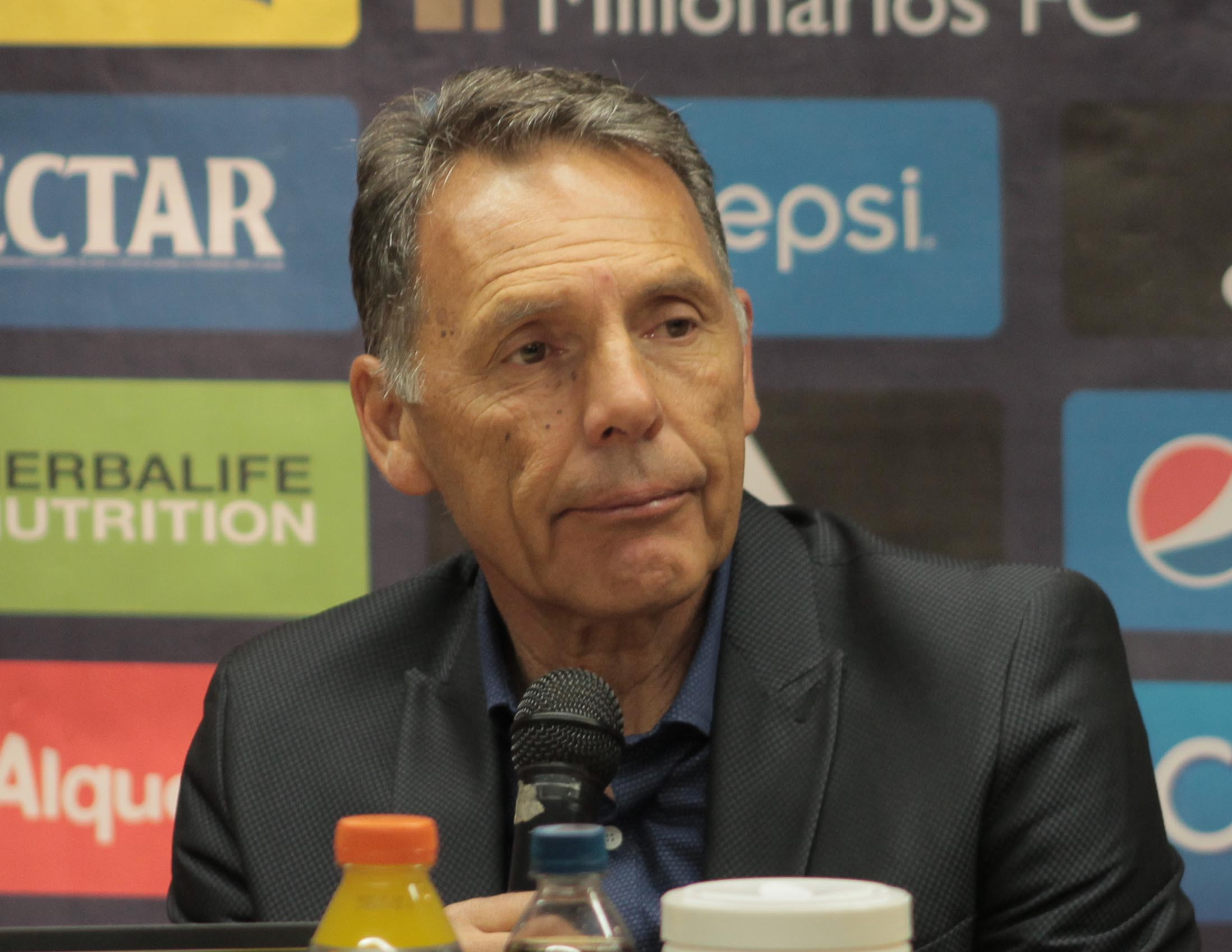
Russo as manager of Colombian team Millonarios in 2017

On 23 December 2016, he was chosen to train Millonarios F.C. from Bogotá, Colombia, after the untimely departure of Diego Cocca. On 17 December 2017, he was crowned Champion of the second half of 2017 with Millonarios F.C. (Torneo Clausura), to which he gave them the title number 15 after winning the first leg 1–0, and then drawing 2–2 against Independiente Santa Fe. With this victory, Millonarios F.C. will go directly to the group stage of the Copa Libertadores played among the best club teams in South America.

On 4 January 2019, he was officially appointed the new Alianza Lima coach. However, he decided to terminate his contract for personal reasons and poor results.

On 7 June 2019, his transfer to Cerro Porteño was made official. On 6 October 2019, after losing to Deportivo Capiatá, the club decided to do without its services.

In January 2020, he started his second cycle with Boca Juniors, two months later he obtained a new title winning the 2019–20 Superliga beating River Plate led by Marcelo Gallardo in the final stretch. After being eliminated by Santos (BRA) from the CONMEBOL Libertadores, Boca Juniors played Copa Diego Maradona final against Banfield. This match ended in a tie in one, and finally, Boca Juniors became champions by winning the penalties. On 17 August 2021, he was sacked by the club.

Russo spent most of the 2021–22 season in charge of Al-Nassr in Saudi Arabia, before returning to Rosario Central on 18 December 2022. He later returned to San Lorenzo before being appointed for a third stint at Boca Juniors ahead of their participation in the 2025 FIFA Club World Cup.

== Personal life and death ==
Russo's son, Ignacio, is a professional footballer.

Russo died at home on 8 October 2025, at the age of 69, after battling prostate cancer since 2017.

== Managerial statistics ==
Managerial record by team and tenure
Team	From	To	Record							
Team	From	To	G	W	D	L	GF	GA	GD	Win %
Lanús	1 July 1989	30 June 1994	200	70	74	56	238	210	+28	35.00
Estudiantes LP	1 July 1994	30 September 1995	53	27	16	10	94	48	+46	50.94
Universidad de Chile	1 January 1996	31 December 1996	54	25	12	17	87	71	+16	46.30
Rosario Central	1 July 1997	30 June 1998	42	16	12	14	66	56	+10	38.10
Salamanca	1 August 1998	30 January 1999	16	4	4	8	20	24	−4	25.00
Colón	1 July 1999	31 October 1999	12	3	4	5	15	19	−4	25.00
Lanús	30 November 1999	30 June 2000	34	12	6	16	53	46	+7	35.29
Los Andes	1 December 2000	30 June 2001	26	6	6	14	33	49	−16	23.08
Morelia	27 October 2001	16 February 2002	15	5	4	6	19	18	+1	33.33
Rosario Central	1 July 2002	31 December 2004	67	25	20	22	93	89	+4	37.31
Vélez Sarsfield	1 January 2005	15 December 2006	95	43	29	23	134	87	+47	45.26
Boca Juniors	15 December 2006	31 December 2007	56	30	12	14	102	56	+46	53.57
San Lorenzo	1 July 2008	8 April 2009	36	17	5	14	56	44	+12	47.22
Rosario Central	16 April 2009	14 July 2009	11	5	2	4	12	11	+1	45.45
Racing Club	17 February 2010	30 June 2011	53	23	9	21	65	59	+6	43.40
Estudiantes LP	1 July 2011	6 November 2011	16	3	4	9	16	24	−8	18.75
Rosario Central	6 July 2012	29 November 2014	101	44	26	31	123	104	+19	43.56
Vélez Sarsfield	1 January 2015	31 December 2015	34	10	9	15	35	38	−3	29.41
Millonarios	1 January 2017	13 November 2018	112	45	37	30	134	93	+41	40.18
Alianza Lima	1 January 2019	26 April 2019	15	3	4	8	18	26	−8	20.00
Cerro Porteño	7 June 2019	8 October 2019	19	7	7	5	30	19	+11	36.84
Boca Juniors	1 January 2020	16 August 2021	64	29	23	12	87	40	+47	45.31
Al-Nassr	5 December 2021	28 June 2022	20	15	2	3	41	22	+19	75.00
Rosario Central	19 December 2022	2 August 2024	79	27	28	24	92	86	+6	34.18
San Lorenzo	17 October 2024	30 May 2025	30	11	10	9	23	22	+1	36.67
Boca Juniors	31 May 2025	8 October 2025	13	3	7	3	17	13	+4	23.08
Total			1,273	509	371	393	1,707	1,375	+332	39.98

== Honours ==
=== Player ===
Estudiantes (LP)

- Primera División: 1982 Metropolitano, 1983 Nacional

=== Manager ===
Lanús

- Primera B Nacional: 1991–92

Estudiantes (LP)

- Primera B Nacional: 1994–95 (Note: Shared duties with Eduardo Luján Manera.)

Vélez Sarsfield

- Argentine Primera División: 2005 Clausura

Boca Juniors

- Primera División: 2019–20
- Copa de la Liga Profesional: 2020
- Copa Libertadores: 2007

Rosario Central

- Primera B Nacional: 2012–13
- Copa de la Liga Profesional: 2023

Millonarios

- Categoría Primera A: 2017 Finalización
- Superliga Colombiana: Superliga 2018

Individual

- Saudi Professional League Manager of the Month: January 2022

== See also ==
- List of football managers with the most matches
