= Hugo Gottardi =

Argentine footballer and coach

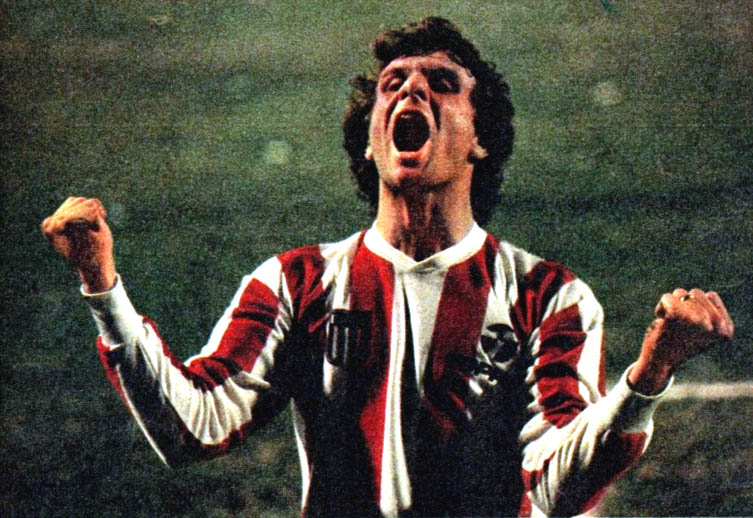
- Gottardi with Estudiantes LP in 1983

Personal information
- Full name: Hugo Ernesto Gottardi
- Date of birth: July 31, 1953 (age 73)
- Place of birth: Elortondo, Argentina
- Position: Striker

Senior career*
Years	Team	Apps	(Gls)
1973–1976	Racing Club	117	(54)
1974	→ Quilmes Atlético Club	7	(0)
1976–1983	Estudiantes	310	(125)
1983–1986	Independiente Santa Fe	104	(59)
1987–1988	Talleres	23	(7)
1988–1989	Lanús	-	
- * Club domestic league appearances and goals as of July 2007

Hugo Ernesto Gottardi (born July 31, 1953, in Elortondo, Santa Fe, Argentina) is a former Argentine football player and coach.

== Playing career ==
Gottardi made his mark as a striker, first with Racing Club de Avellaneda and then with Estudiantes de La Plata, where he scored most of his goals, as top scorer of the team that won back-to-back championship titles Metropolitano 1982 and Nacional 1983. Gottardi became one of the Argentine league top scorers.

Following his successful stint with Estudiantes, Gottardi was transferred to Independiente de Santa Fe of Colombia in 1983, where he played until 1986, winning two times the prize ("Botín de Oro" ) as top scorer in the league (1983 and 1984). In Colombia he received the nickname "terremoto" (Earthquake) by Independiente Santa fe fans.

Gottardi returned to Argentina in 1987 to play for Talleres de Córdoba and then Lanús between 1988 and his retirement in 1989.

After retirement, Gottardi became part of Miguel Angel Russo's coaching team. They obtained the 2005 Clausura title with Vélez Sársfield. In December 2006, Gottardi joined Boca Juniors as Russo's assistant coach, winning the 2007 Copa Libertadores.

== Coaching career ==
After retirement, Gottardi became part of Miguel Angel Russo's coaching team. They obtained the 2005 Clausura title with Vélez Sársfield. In December 2006, Gottardi joined Boca Juniors as Russo's assistant coach, winning the 2007 Copa Toyota Libertadores.

== Honours ==
=== Player ===
Estudiantes

- Primera División Argentina: Metropolitano 1982, Nacional 1983
