= 1983 Argentine Primera División =

92nd season of top-tier football league in Argentina

Primera División
- Season: 1983
- Champions: Independiente (Metropolitano); Estudiantes LP (Nacional)

The 1983 Primera División season was the 92nd season of top-flight football in Argentina. Independiente won the Metropolitano (13th title) and Estudiantes de La Plata won the Nacional championship (4th title).

Nueva Chicago and Racing Club were relegated by the average system.

== Metropolitano Championship ==
Metropolitano
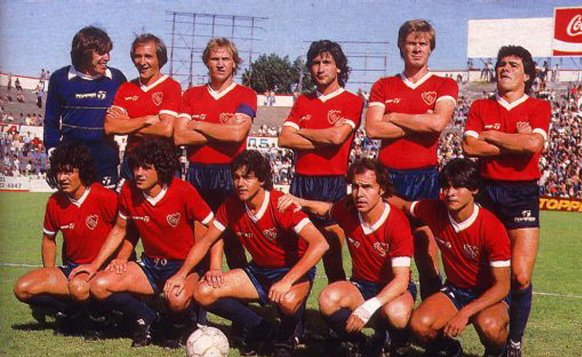
- Independiente, Metropolitano champions
- Season: 1983
- Champions: Independiente (13th title)
- Relegated: Nueva Chicago; Racing
- 1984 Copa Libertadores: Independiente
- Top goalscorer: (Argentina) Víctor Ramos (30 goals)

Pos	Team	Pld	W	D	L	GF	GA	GD	Pts
1	Independiente	36	16	16	4	54	38	+16	48
2	San Lorenzo	36	20	7	9	69	43	+26	47
3	Ferro Carril Oeste	36	16	14	6	44	27	+17	46
4	Vélez Sársfield	36	18	8	10	61	45	+16	44
5	Unión	36	14	10	12	47	43	+4	38
5	Estudiantes (LP)	36	13	12	11	42	43	−1	38
7	Boca Juniors	36	14	9	13	57	61	−4	37
8	Argentinos Juniors	36	13	10	13	44	45	−1	36
9	Newell's Old Boys	36	11	13	12	56	49	+7	35
9	Instituto	36	12	11	13	45	48	−3	35
11	Platense	36	11	12	13	41	44	−3	34
12	Temperley	36	12	9	15	46	51	−5	33
12	Talleres (C)	36	11	11	14	41	58	−17	33
14	Huracán	36	11	10	15	44	47	−3	32
14	Nueva Chicago	36	10	12	14	38	48	−10	32
16	Rosario Central	36	11	8	17	50	60	−10	30
16	Racing	36	11	8	17	38	49	−11	30
18	River Plate	36	10	9	17	37	50	−13	29
19	Racing (C)	36	7	13	16	46	51	−5	27

== Nacional Championship ==
Nacional
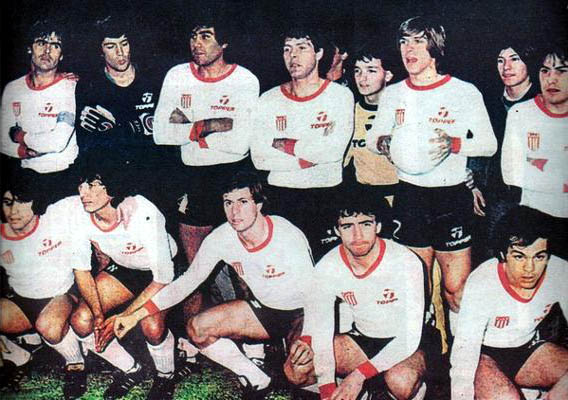
- Estudiantes LP, Nacional champions
- Season: 1983
- Champions: Estudiantes (LP) (4th title)
- Promoted: San Lorenzo; Temperley
- 1984 Copa Libertadores: Estudiantes (LP)
- Top goalscorer: (Argentina) Mario Husillos (11 goals)

=== 1st step ===
==== Group A ====
Pos	Team	Pld	W	D	L	GF	GA	GD	Pts
1	Loma Negra	6	3	2	1	7	2	+5	8
1	Nueva Chicago	6	3	2	1	8	4	+4	8
3	River Plate	6	2	2	2	6	5	+1	6
4	Andino	6	1	0	5	3	13	−10	2

==== Group B ====
Pos	Team	Pld	W	D	L	GF	GA	GD	Pts
1	Argentinos Juniors	6	3	3	0	11	6	+5	9
1	Independiente	6	3	3	0	11	3	+8	9
3	San Martín (T)	6	1	1	4	6	12	−6	3
3	Chaco For Ever	6	1	1	4	5	12	−7	3

==== Group C ====
Pos	Team	Pld	W	D	L	GF	GA	GD	Pts
1	San Lorenzo	6	5	1	0	14	6	+8	11
2	Rosario Central	6	3	1	2	15	5	+10	7
3	Juventud Antoniana	6	2	2	2	13	11	+2	6
4	Santa Rosa	6	0	0	6	4	24	−20	0

==== Group D ====
Pos	Team	Pld	W	D	L	GF	GA	GD	Pts
1	Talleres (C)	6	3	3	0	7	1	+6	9
2	Ferro Carril Oeste	6	2	4	0	4	2	+2	8
3	Temperley	6	2	2	2	3	3	0	6
4	Estudiantes (RC)	6	0	1	5	4	12	−8	1

==== Group E ====
Pos	Team	Pld	W	D	L	GF	GA	GD	Pts
1	Estudiantes (LP)	6	3	2	1	14	8	+6	8
1	Racing (C)	6	3	2	1	14	6	+8	8
3	Unión	6	2	3	1	5	5	0	7
4	Unión San Vicente	6	0	1	5	3	17	−14	1

==== Group F ====
Pos	Team	Pld	W	D	L	GF	GA	GD	Pts
1	Vélez Sársfield	6	5	1	0	12	3	+9	11
2	Newell's Old Boys	6	2	3	1	12	6	+6	7
3	Altos Hornos Zapla	6	1	2	3	5	8	−3	4
4	Kimberley	6	1	0	5	5	17	−12	2

==== Group G ====
Pos	Team	Pld	W	D	L	GF	GA	GD	Pts
1	Huracán	6	4	1	1	9	4	+5	9
2	Racing Club	6	2	2	2	5	4	+1	6
2	Renato Cesarini	6	2	1	3	9	11	−2	5
4	Atlético Uruguay	6	1	2	3	6	10	−4	4

==== Group H ====
Pos	Team	Pld	W	D	L	GF	GA	GD	Pts
1	Boca Juniors	6	3	2	1	9	5	+4	8
2	Platense	6	3	1	2	9	8	+1	7
3	Instituto	6	2	1	3	6	8	−2	5
4	Gimnasia y Esgrima (M)	6	1	2	3	6	9	−3	4

=== 2nd step ===
==== Group A ====
Pos	Team	Pld	W	D	L	GF	GA	GD	Pts
1	Estudiantes LP	6	4	0	2	7	3	+4	8
2	Vélez Sársfield	6	3	1	2	5	6	−1	7
3	Instituto	6	1	1	4	8	11	−3	3

==== Group B ====
Pos	Team	Pld	W	D	L	GF	GA	GD	Pts
1	Independiente	6	3	2	1	12	6	+6	8
1	Temperley	6	2	4	0	8	5	+3	8
3	Nueva Chicago	6	0	2	4	3	12	−9	2

==== Group C ====
Pos	Team	Pld	W	D	L	GF	GA	GD	Pts
1	River Plate	6	3	2	1	5	2	+3	8
2	Ferro Carril Oeste	6	2	2	2	7	6	+1	6
2	San Lorenzo	6	0	6	0	2	2	0	6

==== Group D ====
Pos	Team	Pld	W	D	L	GF	GA	GD	Pts
1	Platense	6	3	0	3	8	13	−5	6
2	Unión	6	1	3	2	7	4	+3	5
2	Huracán	6	2	1	3	6	8	−2	5

==== Group E ====
Pos	Team	Pld	W	D	L	GF	GA	GD	Pts
1	Boca Juniors	6	4	0	2	11	4	+7	8
1	Racing	6	4	0	2	6	4	+2	8
3	Altos Hornos Zapla	6	1	2	3	3	8	−5	4

==== Group F ====
Pos	Team	Pld	W	D	L	GF	GA	GD	Pts
1	Rosario Central	6	4	1	1	9	4	+5	9
2	Talleres (C)	6	0	4	2	4	8	−4	4
3	San Martín (T)	6	1	1	4	5	10	−5	3

==== Group G ====
Pos	Team	Pld	W	D	L	GF	GA	GD	Pts
1	Loma Negra	6	4	2	0	16	3	+13	10
2	Argentinos Juniors	6	2	3	1	11	9	+2	7
3	Juventud Antoniana	6	0	0	6	4	16	−12	0

==== Group H ====
Pos	Team	Pld	W	D	L	GF	GA	GD	Pts
1	Racing (C)	6	5	0	1	13	10	+3	10
2	Newell's Old Boys	6	4	1	1	14	10	+4	9
3	Renato Cesarini	6	0	0	6	4	14	−10	0

=== 1/8 finals ===
Club	-	Club	1st leg	2nd leg
Talleres (C)	-	Racing (C)	2-2	0-0 (3-5 p)
Unión	-	Independiente	1-0	0-1 (5-6 p)
Loma Negra	-	Racing	2-1	0-4
Newell's Old Boys	-	Rosario Central	0-0	0-2
Temperley	-	Platense	2-1	0-0
Estudiantes (LP)	-	Ferro Carril Oeste	1-0	2-2
River Plate	-	Vélez Sársfield	1-0	0-0
Boca Juniors	-	Argentinos Juniors	1-1	2-3

=== Quarterfinals ===
Club	-	Club	1st leg	2nd leg
Estudiantes (LP)	-	Racing	3-1	1-2
Rosario Central	-	Temperley	0-1	1-1
Racing (C)	-	Independiente	1-1	1-1 (PK 2-4)
River Plate	-	Argentinos Juniors	0-0	0-1

=== Semifinals ===
Club	-	Club	1st leg	2nd leg
Argentinos Juniors	-	Independiente	2-1	0-2
Estudiantes (LP)	-	Temperley	1-1	3-1

=== Finals ===
1983 Torneo Nacional Final
7 June 1983
First leg

Estudiantes (LP)	2–0	Independiente
Gottardi; Trama	Report

Estadio Jorge Luis Hirschi, La Plata
Referee: Juan C. Lousteau

10 June 1983
Second leg

Independiente	2–1	Estudiantes (LP)
Giusti 14'; Trossero 70'	Report	Trama 44'

Independiente Stadium, Avellaneda
Referee: (Argentina) Arturo Ithurralde

Note: Estudiantes LP won 3–2 on goal difference.
