= 1985 Intercontinental Cup =

- Official programme
- Event: Intercontinental Cup
Juventus	Argentinos Juniors
(Italy)	(Argentina)
2	2
- After extra time Juventus won 4–2 on penalties
- Date: 8 December 1985
- Venue: National Stadium, Tokyo
- Man of the Match: Michel Platini (Juventus)
- Referee: Volker Roth (West Germany)
- Attendance: 62,000

The 1985 Intercontinental Cup was an Association football match played on 8 December 1985, between Juventus, winners of the 1984–85 European Cup, and Argentinos Juniors, winners of the 1985 Copa Libertadores. Recognised as the best edition in the history of the tournament for technical and agonistic level, the match was played at the National Stadium in Tokyo. It was Juventus' second appearance into the competition, after replacing Ajax in 1973.

== Venue ==
Tokyo
Olympic Stadium
Capacity: 48,000
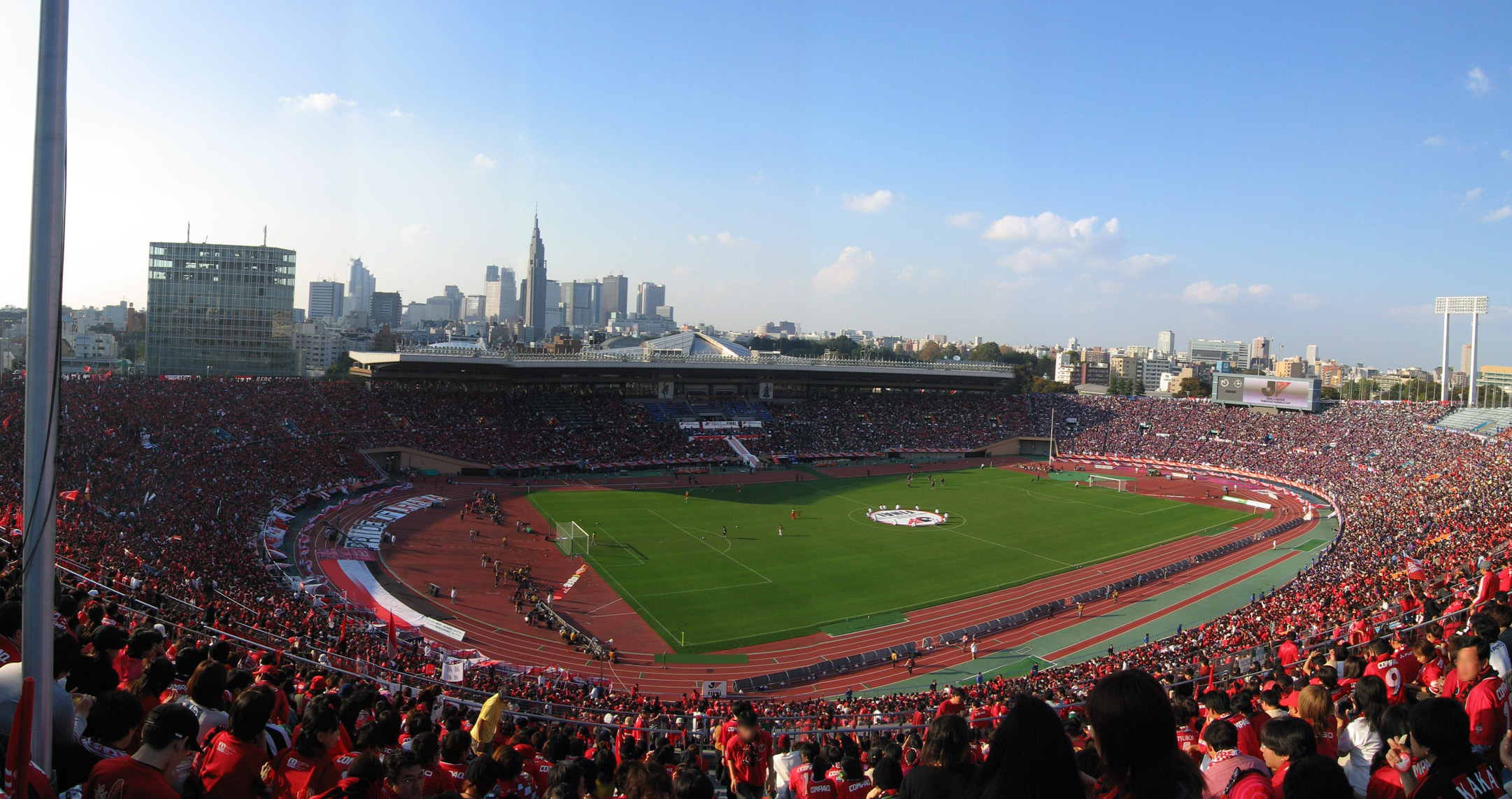

== Match ==
=== Summary ===
Despite Juventus arriving in Tokyo as the favorites to win the match, Argentinos Juniors' performance surpassed expectations, efficacy and the play of 20-year old forward Claudio Borghi.

After a balanced first half in which the Italian side seemed more comfortable, Argentinos Juniors took control early in the second. In the 55th minute, Carlos Ereros appeared on a typical diagonal run—one of his trademarks—after a pass from Mario Videla, and chipped the ball over Stefano Tacconi's head.

Then, in the 63rd minute, Michel Platini leveled the score with a penalty after defender Jorge Olguín fouled Aldo Serena. But in the 75th minute, Claudio Borghi, one of the key players for the Argentinos Juniors side, played a through ball to José Antonio Castro, who curled a shot across goal and into the top corner to put his team in a 2–1 advantage. "When Borghi got the ball, I made a run and knew he was coming towards my side. I was able to connect perfectly, and the ball went in at the far post," Castro recounted.

Finally, at 82 minutes, Danish forward Michael Laudrup put the finishing touch on a skillful attacking maneuver by Juventus and scored the 2–2. As after an extra time the score remained the same, a Penalty shoot-out was conducted to determine a winner. Sergio Batista and José Luis Pavoni failed for Argentinos Juniors while conversions by Sergio Brio, Antonio Cabrini, Serena, and Platini set the 4–2 on penalties that allowed Juventus to win their first Intercontinental trophy.

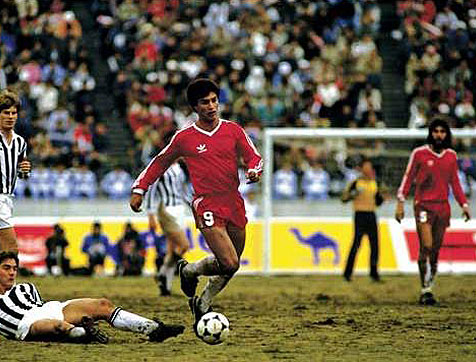
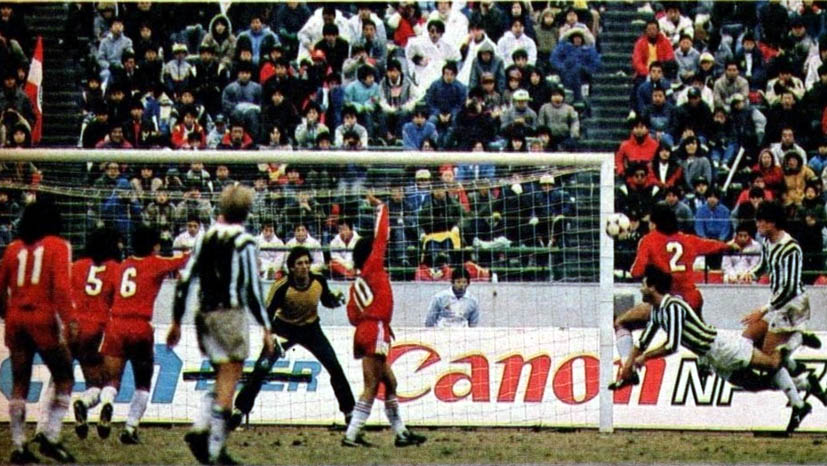
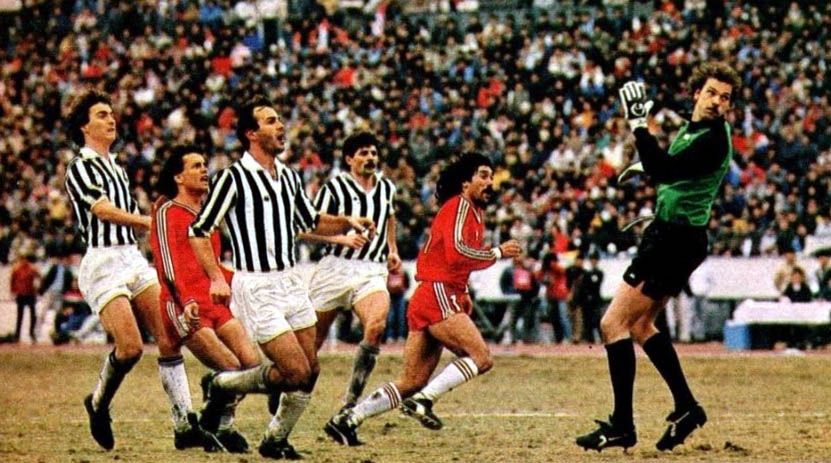
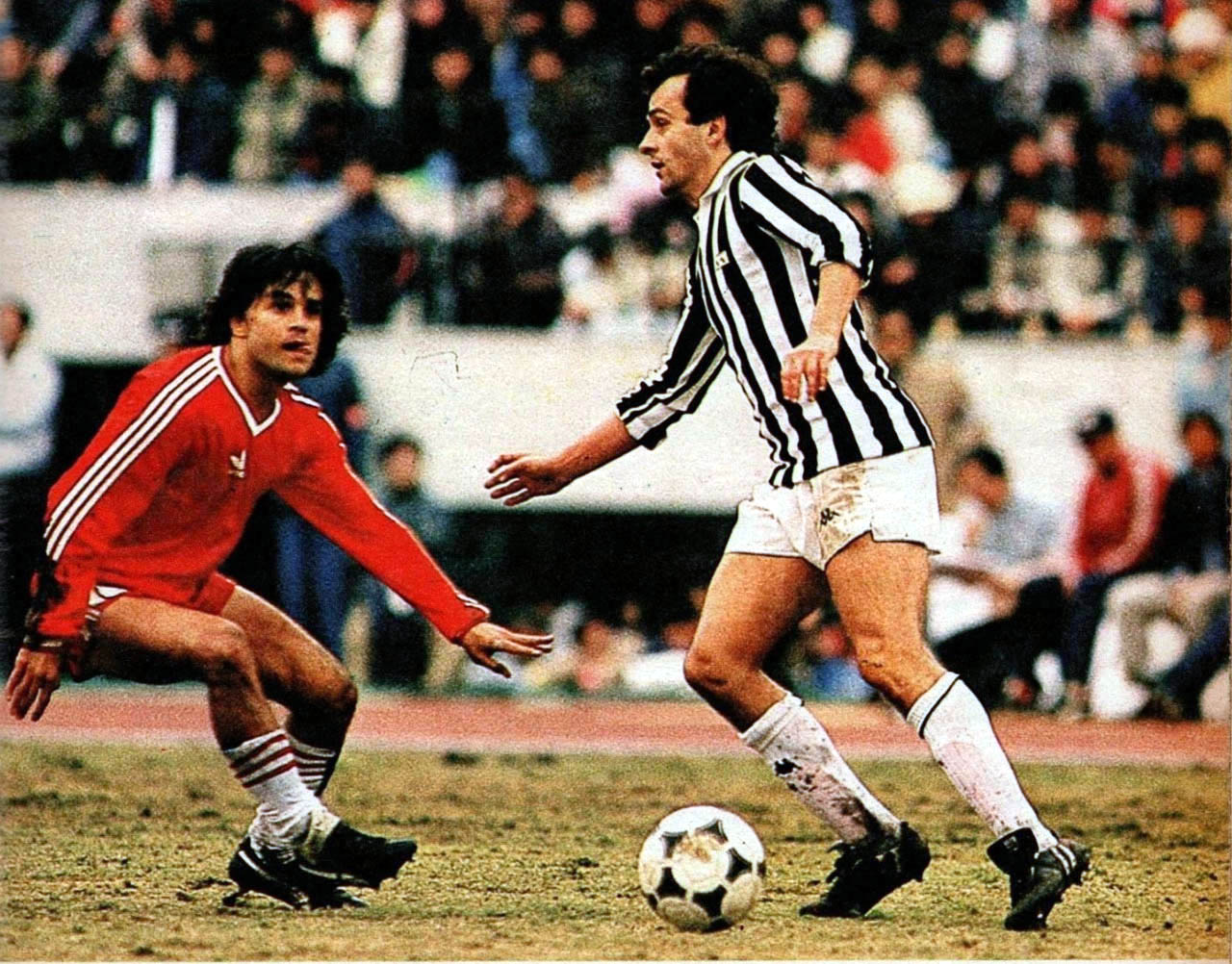
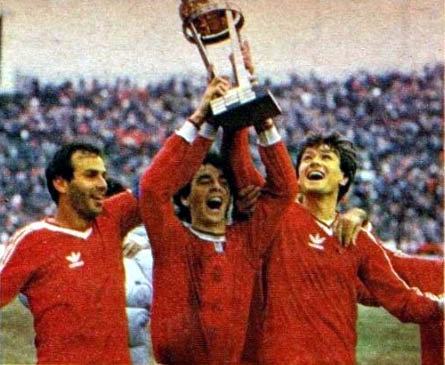
Some moments of the match, fltr: Claudio Borghi carrying the ball, Juventus attacking, the 2nd goal by Carlos Ereros, and Michel Platini marked by Emilio Commisso, and players of Juventus celebrating with the trophy

=== Details ===
1985 Intercontinental Cup
8 December 1985
12:00 UTC+9

Juventus (Italy)	2–2 (a.e.t.)	(Argentina) Argentinos Juniors
Platini 63' (pen.); Laudrup 82'	Report	Ereros 55'; Castro 75'
Penalties
Brio (penalty scored); Cabrini (penalty scored); Serena (penalty scored); Laudrup (penalty missed); Platini (penalty scored)	4–2	(penalty scored) Olguín; (penalty missed) Batista; (penalty scored) López; (penalty missed) Pavoni

National Stadium, Tokyo
Attendance: 62,000
Referee: Volker Roth (West Germany)

Juventus	Argentinos Juniors

GK	1	(Italy) Stefano Tacconi
RB	2	(Italy) Luciano Favero
CB	5	(Italy) Sergio Brio
SW	6	(Italy) Gaetano Scirea (c)		(substituted off) 64'
LB	3	(Italy) Antonio Cabrini
DM	4	(San Marino) Massimo Bonini
CM	7	(Italy) Massimo Mauro	(yellow card) 67'	(substituted off) 78'
CM	8	(Italy) Lionello Manfredonia
AM	10	(France) Michel Platini	(yellow card) 3'
CF	9	(Italy) Aldo Serena
CF	11	(Denmark) Michael Laudrup
Substitutes:
GK	12	(Italy) Luciano Bodini
DF	13	(Italy) Stefano Pioli		(substituted on) 64'
MF	14	(Italy) Gabriele Pin
FW	15	(Italy) Marco Pacione
FW	16	(Italy) Massimo Briaschi		(substituted on) 78'
Manager:
(Italy) Giovanni Trapattoni

GK	1	(Argentina) Enrique Vidallé
RB	4	(Argentina) Carmelo Villalba
CB	2	(Argentina) José Luis Pavoni
CB	6	(Argentina) Jorge Olguín
LB	3	(Argentina) Adrián Domenech (c)
RM	10	(Argentina) Emilio Commisso		(substituted off) 82'
CM	5	(Argentina) Sergio Batista
LM	8	(Argentina) Mario Videla	(yellow card) 21'
RW	7	(Argentina) José Antonio Castro
CF	9	(Argentina) Claudio Borghi	(yellow card) 47'
LW	11	(Argentina) Carlos Ereros		(substituted off) 117'
Substitutes:
GK	12	(Paraguay) César Roberto Mendoza
DF	13	(Argentina) Jorge Pellegrini
MF	14	(Argentina) Juan José López		(substituted on) 117'
DF	15	(Argentina) Miguel Ángel Lemme
MF	16	(United States) Renato Corsi	(yellow card) 88'	(substituted on) 82'
Manager:
(Argentina) José Yudica

Man of the Match:
Michel Platini (Juventus)

== Aftermath ==
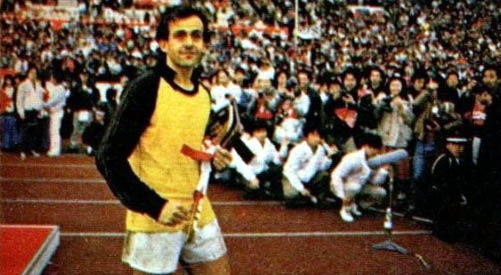
Michel Platini being awarded man of the match

The final is regarded as the best Intercontinental Cup ever played, due to the technical virtues of both teams.

The Argentinos Juniors performance received critical acclaim from both, the press and their rivals. Thirty years after the final, Borghi himself admitted that Argentinos Juniors lost the final because its players relayed excessively in their conditions.

We had a very important rival, in times where there were not so many videos to analyze the rival as today. We stayed in the same hotel than Juventus and therefore we met their players all the time. It was a very nice experience

— Claudio Borghi, remembering the final during a radio interview in 2015, ESPN

Dino Zoff, a true legend of Italian football, said that never in history had a rival team played Juventus that way in a final

— José A. Castro

After their triumph in the competition, Juventus became the first football team ever—remained the only one until 2022—to have won all official continental competitions and the world title.

Also, Italian defenders Gaetano Scirea and Antonio Cabrini became the first European footballers to have won all international club competitions and Giovanni Trapattoni, the first European manager in association football history to do so.

French midfielder Michel Platini was awarded as man of the match.

== See also ==
- 1984–85 European Cup
- 1985 Copa Libertadores
- Juventus F.C. in European football
