= 1985 Copa Libertadores finals =

1985 Copa Libertadores de América finals
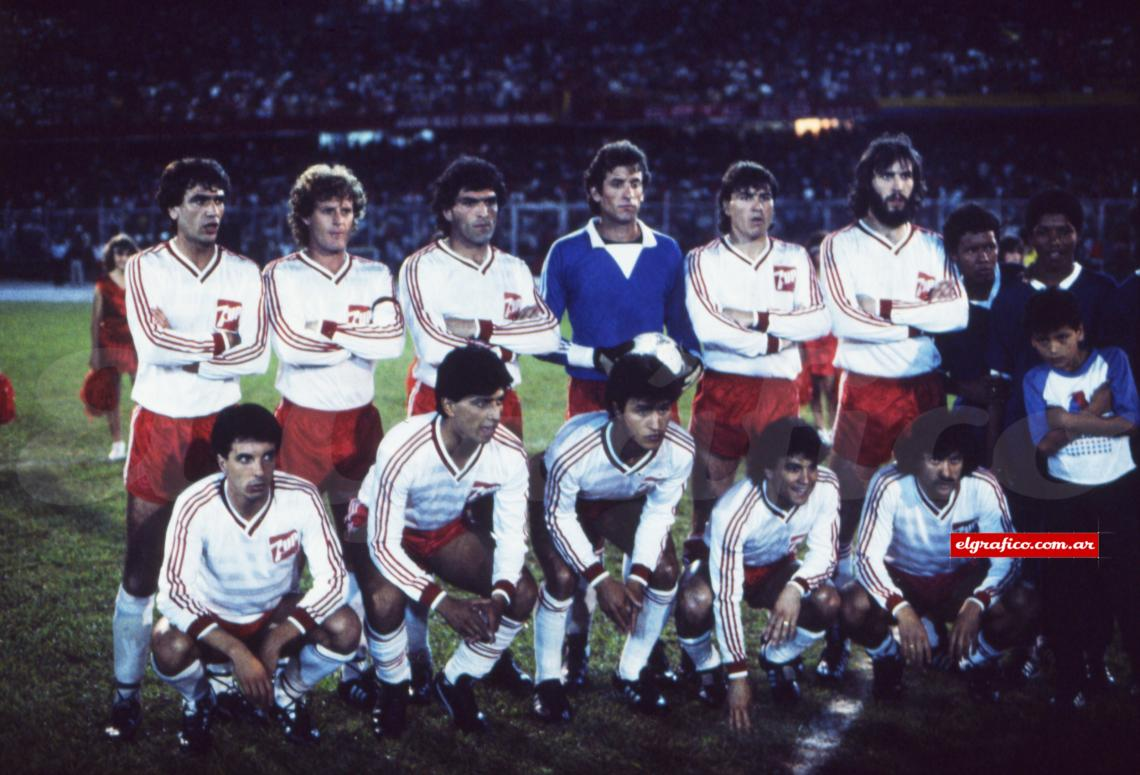
- Argentinos Juniors, champions
- Event: 1985 Copa Libertadores
Argentinos Juniors	América de Cali
(Argentina)	(Colombia)
- 2–2 on points Tied after a play-off Argentinos Juniors won 5–4 on penalties

First leg
Argentinos Juniors	América de Cali
1	0
- Date: 17 October 1985
- Venue: Monumental, Buenos Aires
- Referee: Juan F. Escobar (Paraguay)
- Attendance: 50,000

Second leg
América de Cali	Argentinos Juniors
1	0
- Date: 22 October 1985
- Venue: Pascual Guerrero, Cali
- Referee: Luis Félix (Brazil)
- Attendance: 35,350

Play-off
América de Cali	Argentinos Juniors
1	1
- After extra time
- Date: 24 October 1985
- Venue: Defensores del Chaco, Asunción
- Referee: Hernán Silva (Chile)
- Attendance: 25,000

The 1985 Copa Libertadores de América finals was the final contested by Argentinian club Argentinos Juniors and Colombian América de Cali. The first leg of the tie was played on 17 October at Estádio Monumental, the second leg played on 22 October at Estadio Olímpico Pascual Guerrero, and the playoff on 24 October at Defensores del Chaco.

After both teams won one game each (by the same score, 1–0), Argentinos Juniors were finally crowned champion in the playoff match held in Asunción. Initially, both sides were tied at 1–1 after extra time. The Argentine side defeated América 5–4 via a penalty shoot-out, winning their first Copa Libertadores title.

== Format ==
The finals was played over two legs; home and away. The team that accumulated the most points —two for a win, one for a draw, zero for a loss— after the two legs was to be crowned champion. If the two teams were tied on points after the second leg, a playoff at a neutral was to be the next tie-breaker. Goal difference was to be used as a last resort.

== Qualified teams ==
Team	Previous finals app.
(Argentina) Argentinos Juniors	None
(Colombia) América de Cali	None

== Venues ==
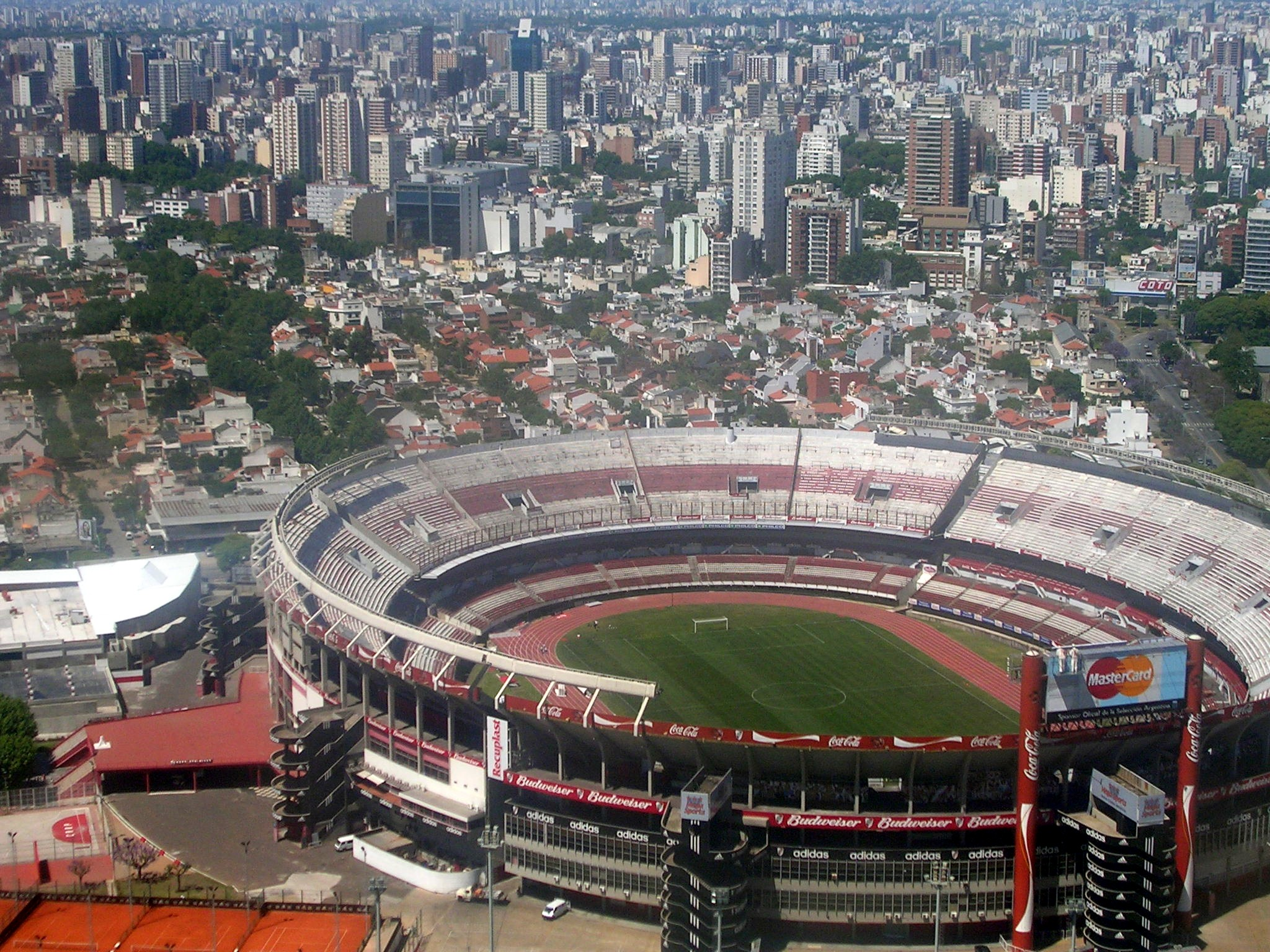
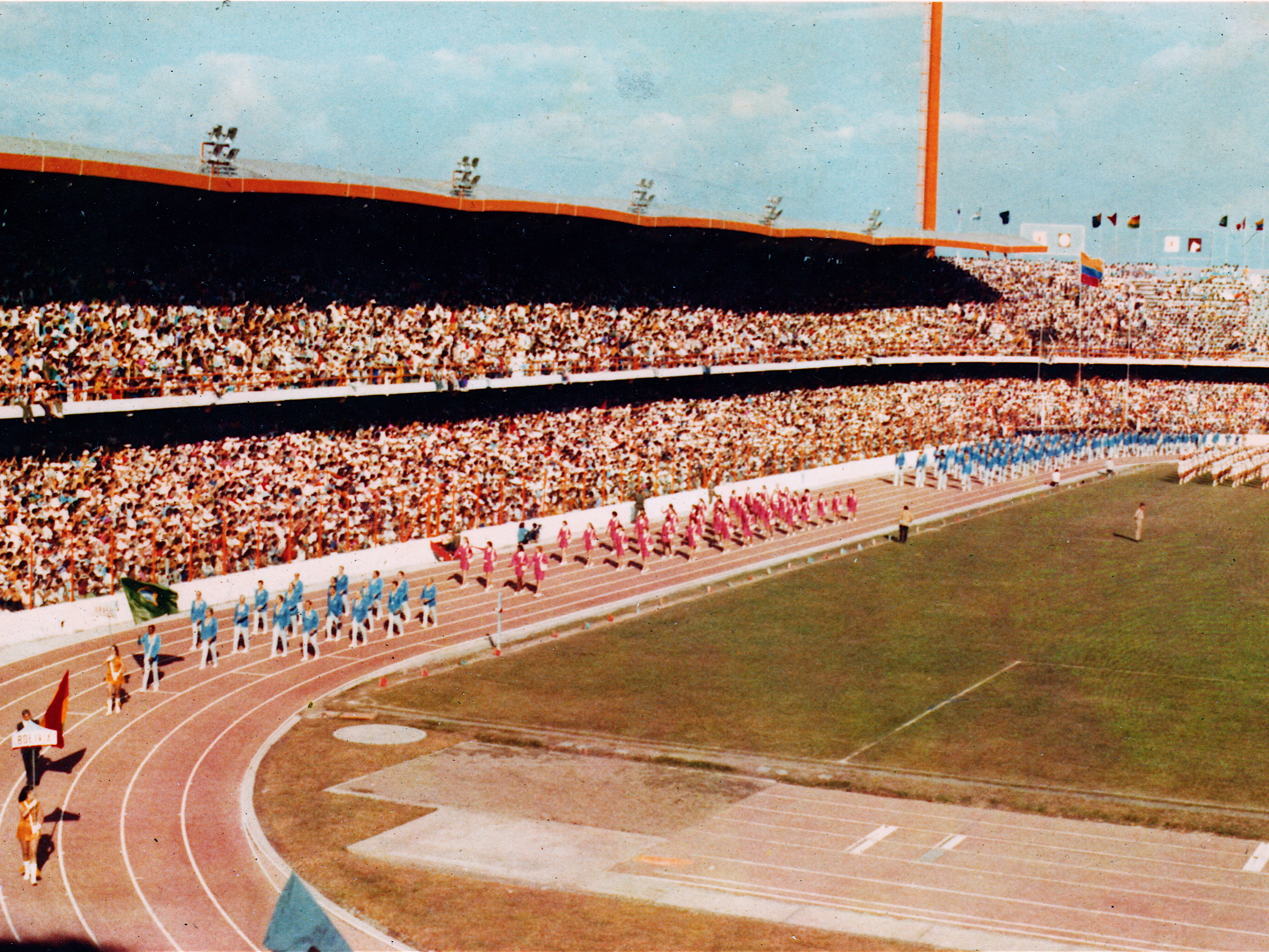
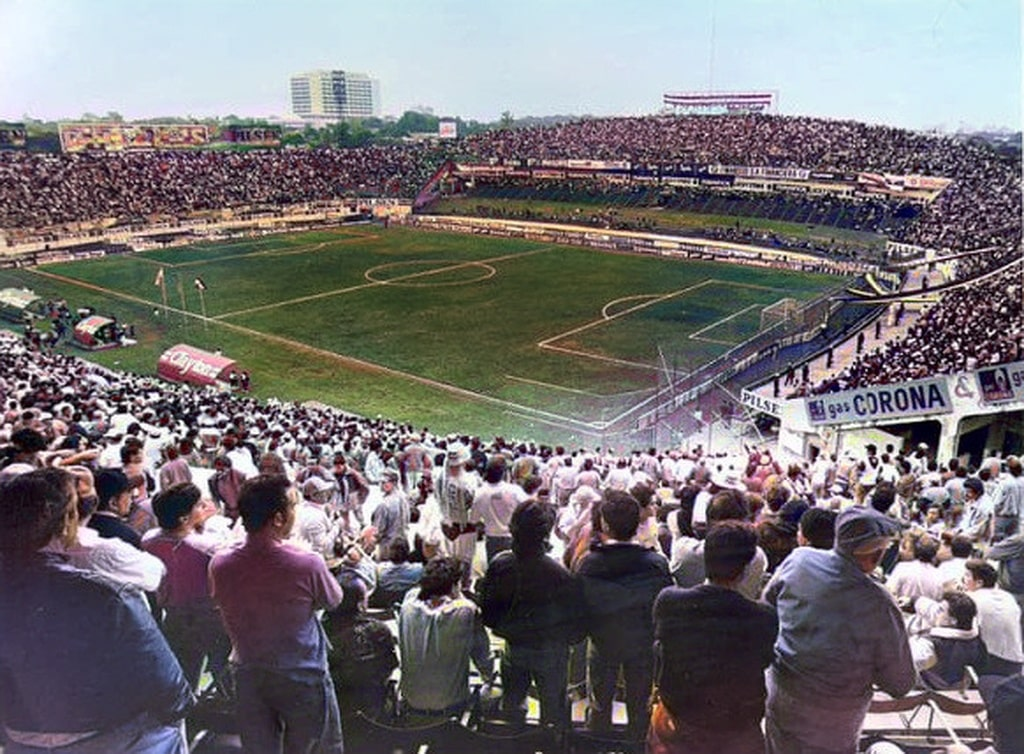
Fltr: Monumental (Buenos Aires), Pascual Guerrero (Cali), and Defensores del Chaco (Asunción) stadiums were the venues for the finals

== Match details ==
=== First leg ===
1985 Copa Libertadores finals
17 October 1985
First leg

Argentinos Juniors (Argentina)	1–0	(Colombia) América de Cali
Commisso 40'

Estadio Monumental, Buenos Aires
Attendance: 50,000
Referee: Juan F. Escobar (Paraguay)

Argentinos Juniors

América de Cali

GK	1	(Argentina) Enrique Vidallé
DF	19	(Argentina) Carmelo Villalba
DF	2	(Argentina) José Luis Pavoni
DF	6	(Argentina) Jorge Olguín
DF	3	(Argentina) Adrián Domenech (c)
MF	10	(Argentina) Emilio Commisso
MF	5	(Argentina) Sergio Batista
MF	8	(Argentina) Mario Videla
FW	9	(Argentina) José Antonio Castro
FW	11	(Argentina) Claudio Borghi
FW	13	(Argentina) Carlos Ereros	(substituted off) 83'
Substitutes:
DF	4	(Argentina) Jorge Pellegrini	(substituted on) 83'

GK	12	(Argentina) Julio Falcioni
DF	4	(Colombia) Jorge Porras	(substituted off) 66'
DF	14	(Colombia) Gonzalo Soto (c)
DF		(Colombia) Henry Viáfara
DF		(Colombia) Hugo Valencia
MF	8	(Paraguay) Gerardo González Aquino
MF	10	(Paraguay) Roberto Cabañas
MF		(Colombia) Juan Penagós	(substituted off) 66'
FW	7	(Colombia) Anthony de Ávila
FW	9	(Colombia) Willington Ortiz
FW	15	(Argentina) Ricardo Gareca
Substitutes:
MF		(Colombia) Gabriel Chaparro	(substituted on) 66'
MF		(Colombia) Alexander Escobar	(substituted on) 66'
Manager:
(Colombia) Gabriel Ochoa Uribe

=== Second leg ===
22 October 1985
Second leg

América de Cali (Colombia)	1–0	(Argentina) Argentinos Juniors
Ortiz 4'

Pascual Guerrero, Cali
Attendance: 50,000
Referee: Luis Félix (Brazil)

América de Cali	Argentinos Juniors

GK	1	(Argentina) Julio Falcioni
RB	12	(Colombia) Hugo Valencia
CB	11	(Colombia) Gonzalo Soto
CB	14	(Colombia) Henry Viáfara
LB	13	(Colombia) Gabriel Chaparro
MF	6	(Colombia) Pedro Sarmiento
MF	8	(Paraguay) Gerardo González Aquino (c)	(yellow card) 19'
MF	10	(Paraguay) Roberto Cabañas
RW	9	(Colombia) Willington Ortiz		(substituted off) 82'
CF	15	(Argentina) Ricardo Gareca
LW	7	(Colombia) Juan Battaglia	(yellow card) 27'	(substituted off) 88'
Substitutes:
FW	19	(Colombia) Anthony de Ávila		(substituted on) 82'
MF	18	(Colombia) Hernán Herrera		(substituted on) 88'
Manager:
(Colombia) Gabriel Ochoa Uribe

GK	1	(Argentina) Enrique Vidallé
RB	4	(Argentina) Carmelo Villalba
CB	2	(Argentina) José Luis Pavoni	(yellow card) 31'
CB	6	(Argentina) Jorge Olguín
LB	3	(Argentina) Adrián Domenech (c)
MF	10	(Argentina) Emilio Commisso
MF	5	(Argentina) Sergio Batista
MF	8	(Argentina) Mario Videla
FW	7	(Argentina) José A. Castro		(substituted off) 88'
FW	9	(Argentina) Claudio Borghi
FW	11	(Argentina) Carlos Ereros		(substituted off) 75'
Substitutes:
FW	21	(Panama) Armando Dely Valdés		(substituted on) 75'
MF	17	(Argentina) Juan José López		(substituted on) 88'
Manager:
(Argentina) José Yudica

=== Playoff ===
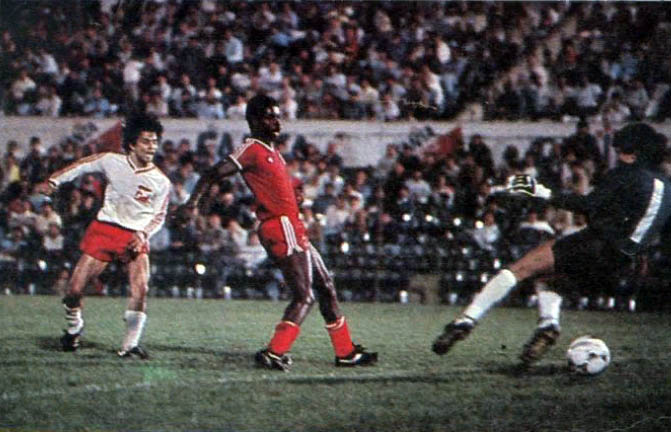
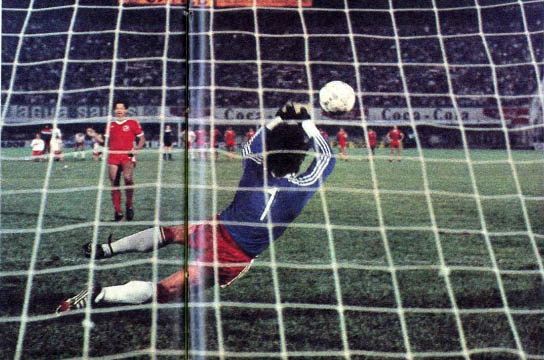
(left): Emilio Commisso scoring for Argentinos; (right): Enrique Vidallé stops the penalty kick that allowed Argentinos Jrs to won the Cup
24 October 1985
Playoff

América de Cali (Colombia)	1–1 (a.e.t.)	(Argentina) Argentinos Juniors
Gareca 42'	Report	Commisso 37'
Penalties
Gareca (penalty scored); Soto (penalty scored); Herrera (penalty scored); Cabañas (penalty scored); de Ávila (penalty missed)	4–5	(penalty scored) Olguín; (penalty scored) Batista; (penalty scored) Pavoni; (penalty scored) Borghi; (penalty scored) Videla

Defensores del Chaco, Asunción
Attendance: 25,000
Referee: Hernán Silva (Chile)

América de Cali	Argentinos Juniors

GK	1	(Argentina) Julio Falcioni
RB	12	(Colombia) Hugo Valencia
CB	11	(Colombia) Gonzalo Soto
CB	14	(Colombia) Henry Viáfara	(yellow card) 60'
LB	13	(Colombia) Gabriel Chaparro
MF	6	(Colombia) Pedro Sarmiento
MF	8	(Paraguay) Gerardo González Aquino (c)
MF	10	(Paraguay) Roberto Cabañas
RW	9	(Colombia) Willington Ortiz		(substituted off) 87'
CF	15	(Argentina) Ricardo Gareca
LW	7	(Colombia) Juan Battaglia		(substituted off) 70'
Substitutes:
MF	18	(Colombia) Hernán Herrera		(substituted on) 70'
FW	19	(Colombia) Anthony de Ávila		(substituted on) 87'
Manager:
(Colombia) Gabriel Ochoa Uribe

GK	1	(Argentina) Enrique Vidallé
RB	4	(Argentina) Carmelo Villalba		(substituted off) 98'
CB	2	(Argentina) José Luis Pavoni
CB	13	(Argentina) Jorge Pellegrini		(substituted off) 116'
LB	3	(Argentina) Adrián Domenech (c)
MF	10	(Argentina) Emilio Commisso
DM	6	(Argentina) Jorge Olguín
DM	5	(Argentina) Sergio Batista	(yellow card) 43'
MF	8	(Argentina) Mario Videla
MF	18	(United States) Renato Corsi
CF	9	(Argentina) Claudio Borghi
Substitutes:
DF	14	(Argentina) Carlos Mayor		(substituted on) 98'
MF	15	(Argentina) Miguel Lemme		(substituted on) 116'
Manager:
(Argentina) José Yudica

== Aftermath ==
I did not see the relevance of that achievement at the time. For me, it meant only one cup else because our team entered to the pitch to win whatever be at stake (...) For a club like Argentinos Juniors, winning a Copa Libertadores is very difficult. The club is not like Boca or River. And something similar happened when we won the Copa Interamericana. Who noticed that we won that cup at Trinidad and Tobago? Nobody.

— Goalkeeper Enrique Vidallé in an interview with La Nación, October 2020
