= 1985 Copa Interamericana =

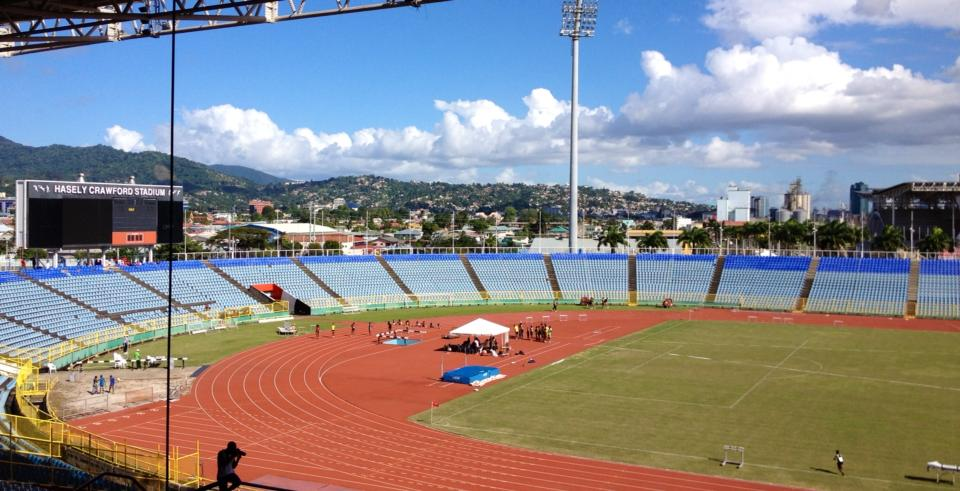
- National Stadium, venue
- Event: Copa Interamericana
| Defence Force | Argentinos Juniors |
| (Trinidad and Tobago) | (Argentina) |
| 0 | 1 |
- Date: December 10, 1986
- Venue: National Stadium, Port of Spain
- Referee: Hubert Tromp (Aruba)
- Attendance: 20,000

The 1985 Copa Interamericana was the 9th. edition of the Copa Interamericana, played after a 6-year hiatus. The final was contested by Argentine club Argentinos Juniors (champion of 1985 Copa Libertadores) and Trinidad and Tobago team Defence Force F.C. (winner of 1985 CONCACAF Champions' Cup). Unlike previous competitions, the final was played as a single game.

As its name said, the club from T&T was part of the local Defence Force with a solid defensive line that had helped the team finish with no goals conceded in the last CONCACAF competition.

The final was held in National Stadium in Port of Spain, where Argentinos Juniors beat Defence Force 1–0 with goal by Panamanian striker Armando Dely Valdés. Thus, the Argentine side won their first and only Copa Interamericana trophy. Besides, coach Roberto Saporiti equaled José Yudica as the most winning manager of the club, with two titles each.

== Qualified teams ==
| Team | Qualification | Previous app. |
|---|---|---|
| (Argentina) Argentinos Juniors | 1985 Copa Libertadores winner | (None) |
| (Trinidad and Tobago) Defence Force | 1985 CONCACAF Champions' Cup winner | (None) |

== Match details ==
1985 Copa Interamericana
December 10, 1986

| Defence Force (Trinidad and Tobago) | 0–1 | (Argentina) Argentinos Juniors |
|---|---|---|
| | Report | Dely Valdes 27' |

National Stadium, Port of Spain
Attendance: 20,000
Referee: Hubert Tromp (Aruba)

| Defence Force | Argentinos Jrs |

| GK | (Trinidad and Tobago) |
| DF | (Trinidad and Tobago) |
| DF | (Trinidad and Tobago) |
| DF | (Trinidad and Tobago) |
| DF | (Trinidad and Tobago) |
| MF | (Trinidad and Tobago) |
| MF | (Trinidad and Tobago) |
| MF | (Trinidad and Tobago) |
| FW | (Trinidad and Tobago) |
| FW | (Trinidad and Tobago) Andrés Kenneth |
| FW | (Trinidad and Tobago) |
Substitutes:
| | (Trinidad and Tobago) |
Manager:
(Trinidad and Tobago)

| GK | 1 | (Argentina) Enrique Vidallé |
| DF | 4 | (Argentina) Carmelo Villalba |
| DF | 2 | (Argentina) José Luis Pavoni |
| DF | 6 | (Argentina) Jorge Olguín |
| DF | 3 | (Argentina) Adrián Domenech |
| MF | 10 | (Argentina) Emilio Commisso |
| MF | 5 | (Argentina) Sergio Batista |
| MF | 8 | (Argentina) Mario Videla | (substituted off) 46' |
| FW | 7 | (Argentina) José A. Castro |
| FW | | (Panama) Armando Dely Valdés |
| FW | 11 | (Argentina) Carlos Ereros |
Substitutes:
| MF | | (Argentina) Julián Infantino | (substituted on) 46' |
Manager:
(Argentina) Roberto Saporiti
