= Carlos Ereros =

Argentine footballer (born 1960)

Personal information
- Full name: Carlos Adolfo Ereros
- Date of birth: 6 March 1960 (age 66)
- Place of birth: Buenos Aires, Argentina
- Height: 1.71 m (5 ft 7 in)
- Position: Forward

Senior career*
Years	Team	Apps	(Gls)
1977–1979	Argentino de Mendoza	?	(?)
1980	San Martín	13	(3)
1981	Unión	8	(0)
1982	Independiente Rivadavia	12	(0)
1982–1989	Argentinos Jrs	228	(55)
1989–1990	Gimnasia y Esgrima	18	(1)
1990–1991	Atlanta	?	(0)
1991–1992	Deportivo Maipú	?	(?)
- * Club domestic league appearances and goals

Carlos Adolfo Ereros (born 6 March 1960) is an Argentine former professional footballer who played as a forward.

== Career ==
He was a member of the Argentinos Juniors team that won the 1985 Copa Libertadores.

One of his most notable stints was with Argentinos Juniors, where he scored a significant number of goals and won several championships, both domestically and internationally. During his time with the team, he established himself as a prolific goal-scorer and a key player in their success.

== Personal life ==
His son Sebastián was also footballer.

== Honours ==
Argentinos Juniors

- Argentine Primera División (2): M-1984, N-1985
- Copa Libertadores (1): 1985
- Copa Interamericana (1): 1985
