= Sebastián Ereros =

Argentine footballer

Personal information
- Full name: Sebastián Adolfo Ereros
- Date of birth: April 14, 1985 (age 41)
- Place of birth: Caseros, Argentina
- Height: 1.68 m (5 ft 6 in)
- Position: Second striker

Team information
- Current team: Talleres de Córdoba

Senior career*
Years	Team	Apps	(Gls)
2006–2010	Vélez Sársfield	26	(6)
2007–2008	→ Tigre (loan)	31	(2)
2008–2009	→ Asteras Tripolis (loan)	6	(0)
2009	→ AS Trenčín (loan)	14	(6)
2009	→ Gimnasia de La Plata (loan)	5	(0)
2010	→ Cerro Porteño (loan)	4	(1)
2010–2011	All Boys	27	(1)
2011–2012	Chacarita Juniors	30	(5)
2012–2013	Deportes Iquique	14	(1)
2013–2014	Instituto	32	(3)
2014–2015	Gimnasia de Jujuy	18	(1)
2015–	Talleres de Córdoba		
- * Club domestic league appearances and goals as of 12 April 2015

Sebastián Adolfo Ereros (born 14 April 1985, in Caseros) is an Argentine football forward currently playing for Talleres de Córdoba in the Torneo Federal A in Argentina.

== Career ==
Ereros started his career in 2005 with Vélez Sársfield. In 2006, he was joint topscorer in the Copa Libertadores 2006 with 5 goals. He scored 6 goals in 26 games in all competitions for Velez.

In 2007 Ereros joined newly promoted Tigre on loan. The Apertura 2007 was Tigre's first season in the Primera since 1980, Ereros was a member of the first team, playing in 13 of Tigre's 19 games and scoring 2 goals. The club finished in 2nd place which was the highest league finish in their history.

On 17 August 2009 he was loaned to Gimnasia de La Plata. On 8 January 2010, Cerro Porteño signed the Argentine forward on loan from Vélez Sársfield.

In July 2010, Ereros joined recently promoted All Boys to play the 2010-11 Argentine Primera División season.

Since season 2013, he plays for Instituto de Córdoba.

== Personal life ==
His father Carlos was also footballer, and he won 1985 Copa Libertadores with Argentinos Juniors.

== Honours ==
Individual

- Copa Libertadores joint top scorer: 2006
