= José Antonio Castro (Argentine footballer) =

Argentine footballer (born 1955)

Personal information
- Date of birth: 15 October 1955 (age 71)
- Place of birth: Buenos Aires, Argentina
- Height: 1.75 m (5 ft 9 in)
- Position: Forward

Senior career*
Years	Team	Apps	(Gls)
1975–1981	Vélez Sarsfield		
1982	Independiente		
1983–1988	Argentinos Juniors		
1988–1990	Unión de Santa Fe		
1990–1991	San Lorenzo		
1991–1992	Universidad de Chile		

International career
1979	Argentina	5	(1)
- * Club domestic league appearances and goals

José Antonio Castro (born 15 October 1955) is an Argentine former footballer who played as a forward. He made five appearances for the Argentina national team in 1979. He was also part of Argentina's squad for the 1979 Copa América tournament.

== Honours ==
Argentinos Juniors

- Argentine Primera División: 1984 Metropolitano, 1985 Nacional
- Copa Libertadores: 1985
- Copa Interamericana: 1985
