= Armando Dely Valdés =

Panamanian footballer (1964–2004)

Personal information
- Full name: Armando Javier Dely Valdés
- Date of birth: January 5, 1964
- Place of birth: Colón, Panama
- Date of death: August 17, 2004 (aged 40)
- Place of death: Colón, Panama
- Position: Striker

Senior career*
Years	Team	Apps	(Gls)
1981–1983	Técnica y Deportes	86	(21)
1983–1988	Argentinos Juniors	245	(118)
1988	Instituto de Córdoba		
1989	San Martín		
1989–1990	Maccabi Tel Aviv		
1990–1991	Beitar Tel Aviv		
1991	Peñarol		
1992	Liverpool MVD	12	(2)
1995	Plaza Amador		

International career
1984–1995	Panama	34	(13)

Managerial career
- 1996: Plaza Amador
- Árabe Unido
- 1996–2001: Panama (assistant)
- Panama U-20
- * Club domestic league appearances and goals

Armando Javier Dely Valdés (5 January 1964 – 17 August 2004) was a Panamanian footballer who played as a forward. He was the elder brother of the twins Julio Dely Valdés and Jorge Dely Valdés.

== Club career ==
He started his playing career with Técnica y Deportes in Panama.

In 1983, he was signed by Argentinos Juniors and went on to win a number of major titles with the club. They were back-to-back league champions in the Metropolitano 1984 and the Nacional 1985. They went on to win the Copa Libertadores in 1985 and the 1985 Copa Interamericana, and played in the Copa Intercontinental against Juventus of Italy.

Nicknamed Pelé, Dely Valdés left Argentinos Juniors for another Argentine team, Instituto de Córdoba. He went on to play for San Martín de Tucumán in Argentina, Maccabi Tel Aviv and Beitar Tel Aviv in Israel, Peñarol and Liverpool in Uruguay.

== International career ==
Dely Valdés represented his country in 4 FIFA World Cup qualification matches. His final international was a December 1995 UNCAF Nations Cup match against Guatemala.

== Retirement and death ==
After retiring as a player he worked as the assistant manager of the Panama national team between 1996 and 2001 and became the coach of the Panama Under-20 team in 2001. He also managed Plaza Amador and Árabe Unido.

On May 29, 2001, Dely Valdés suffered a heart attack which left him in a coma from which he never recovered. He was left in a permanent vegetative state in which he suffered sepsis and lung infections amongst other complications. He died in the Manuel Amador Guerrero Hospital in Colón in 2004. After his death, the Panamanian Football Federation renamed the Árabe Unido football stadium to Estadio Armando Dely Valdés.

== Honours ==
Argentinos Juniors

- Primera División Argentina: 1984, 1985
- Copa Libertadores: 1985
- Copa Interamericana: 1985
