= 1984 Campeonato Ecuatoriano de Fútbol Serie A =

Campeonato Ecuatoriano de Fútbol
- Season: 1984
- Champions: El Nacional
- Relegated: Aucas
- Copa Libertadores: El Nacional; 9 de Octubre
- Matches: 258
- Goals: 735 (2.85 per match)

The 1984 Campeonato Ecuatoriano de Fútbol de la Serie A was the 26th national championship for football teams in Ecuador.

== Teams ==
The number of teams for this season was played by 14 teams.

Club	City
9 de Octubre	Guayaquil
América de Quito	Quito
Aucas	Quito
Barcelona	Guayaquil
Deportivo Cuenca	Cuenca
Deportivo Quevedo	Quevedo
Deportivo Quito	Quito
El Nacional	Quito
Emelec	Guayaquil
Filanbanco	Guayaquil
LDU Portoviejo	Portoviejo
LDU Quito	Quito
Manta	Manta
Técnico Universitario	Ambato
Universidad Católica	Quito

== First stage ==
=== Group A ===
Pos	Team	Pld	W	D	L	GF	GA	GD	Pts	Qualification or relegation
1	Barcelona	14	10	3	1	27	8	+19	23	Qualified to the Octogonal Final
2	Técnico Universitario	14	8	2	4	22	15	+7	18	Qualified to the Octogonal Final
3	Emelec	14	5	5	4	19	14	+5	15	Qualified to the Octogonal Final
4	Deportivo Quito	14	6	3	5	20	16	+4	15	
5	LDU Quito	14	4	3	7	20	26	−6	11	
6	LDU Portoviejo	14	2	7	5	15	22	−7	11	
7	Aucas	14	1	5	8	14	36	−22	7	

Source: RSSSF - 1984 Serie A

=== Group B ===
Pos	Team	Pld	W	D	L	GF	GA	GD	Pts	Qualification or relegation
1	El Nacional	14	9	4	1	30	14	+16	22	Qualified to the Octogonal Final
2	Filanbanco	14	5	5	4	21	15	+6	15	
3	Universidad Católica	14	5	5	4	16	13	+3	15	Qualified to the Octogonal Final
4	9 de Octubre	14	5	4	5	23	26	−3	14	
5	América de Quito	14	4	3	7	13	17	−4	11	
6	Manta	14	4	2	8	18	24	−6	10	
7	Deportivo Quevedo	14	3	3	8	9	26	−17	9	

Source: RSSSF - 1984 Serie A

== Second stage ==
=== Group A ===
Pos	Team	Pld	W	D	L	GF	GA	GD	Pts	Qualification or relegation
1	9 de Octubre	14	7	3	4	29	19	+10	17	Qualified to the Octogonal Final
2	LDU Quito	14	6	3	5	24	16	+8	15	Qualified to the Octogonal Final
3	LDU Portoviejo	14	6	1	7	20	21	−1	13	
4	Emelec	14	4	4	6	18	22	−4	12	
5	América de Quito	14	5	2	7	16	20	−4	12	
6	Deportivo Quevedo	14	5	2	7	15	20	−5	12	
7	Aucas	14	4	3	7	23	33	−10	11	

Source: RSSSF - 1984 Serie A

=== Group B ===
Pos	Team	Pld	W	D	L	GF	GA	GD	Pts	Qualification or relegation
1	El Nacional	14	8	5	1	23	11	+12	21	
2	Barcelona	14	6	6	2	19	12	+7	18	
3	Deportivo Quito	14	4	7	3	21	17	+4	15	Qualified to the Octogonal Final
4	Universidad Católica	14	4	5	5	14	18	−4	13	
5	Manta	14	5	3	6	18	30	−12	13	
6	Técnico Universitario	14	5	2	7	21	18	+3	12	
7	Filanbanco	14	4	4	6	25	29	−4	12	

Source: RSSSF - 1984 Serie A

== Triangular del No Descenso ==
Pos	Team	Pld	W	D	L	GF	GA	GD	Pts	Qualification or relegation
1	Filanbanco (Note: Flanbanco were deducted one point.)	4	4	0	0	8	1	+7	7	
2	Deportivo Quevedo (Note: Deportivo Quevedo were deducted one point.)	4	1	0	3	1	4	−3	1	
3	Aucas (Note: Aucas were deducted two points.)	4	1	0	3	3	7	−4	0	Relegated to the Serie B

Source: RSSSF - 1984 Serie A

== Octogonal Final ==
Pos	Team	Pld	W	D	L	GF	GA	GD	Pts	Qualification
1	El Nacional (Note: El Nacional were awarded two points.) (C)	14	8	2	4	20	16	+4	20	1985 Copa Libertadores
2	9 de Octubre (Note: 9 de Octubre were awarded one point.)	14	7	3	4	30	28	+2	18	1985 Copa Libertadores
3	LDU Quito	14	7	3	4	20	18	+2	17	
4	Universidad Católica	14	6	3	5	19	15	+4	15	
5	Barcelona (Note: Barcelona were awarded one point.)	14	6	1	7	26	18	+8	14	
6	Deportivo Quito	14	5	3	6	20	23	−3	13	
7	Técnico Universitario	14	3	5	6	17	22	−5	11	
8	Emelec	14	2	4	8	18	30	−12	8	

Source: RSSSF - 1984 Serie A
(C) Champions
Notes:

Campeonato Ecuatoriano de Fútbol
1984 champion
