= Juventus FC in international football =

Italian club in international football

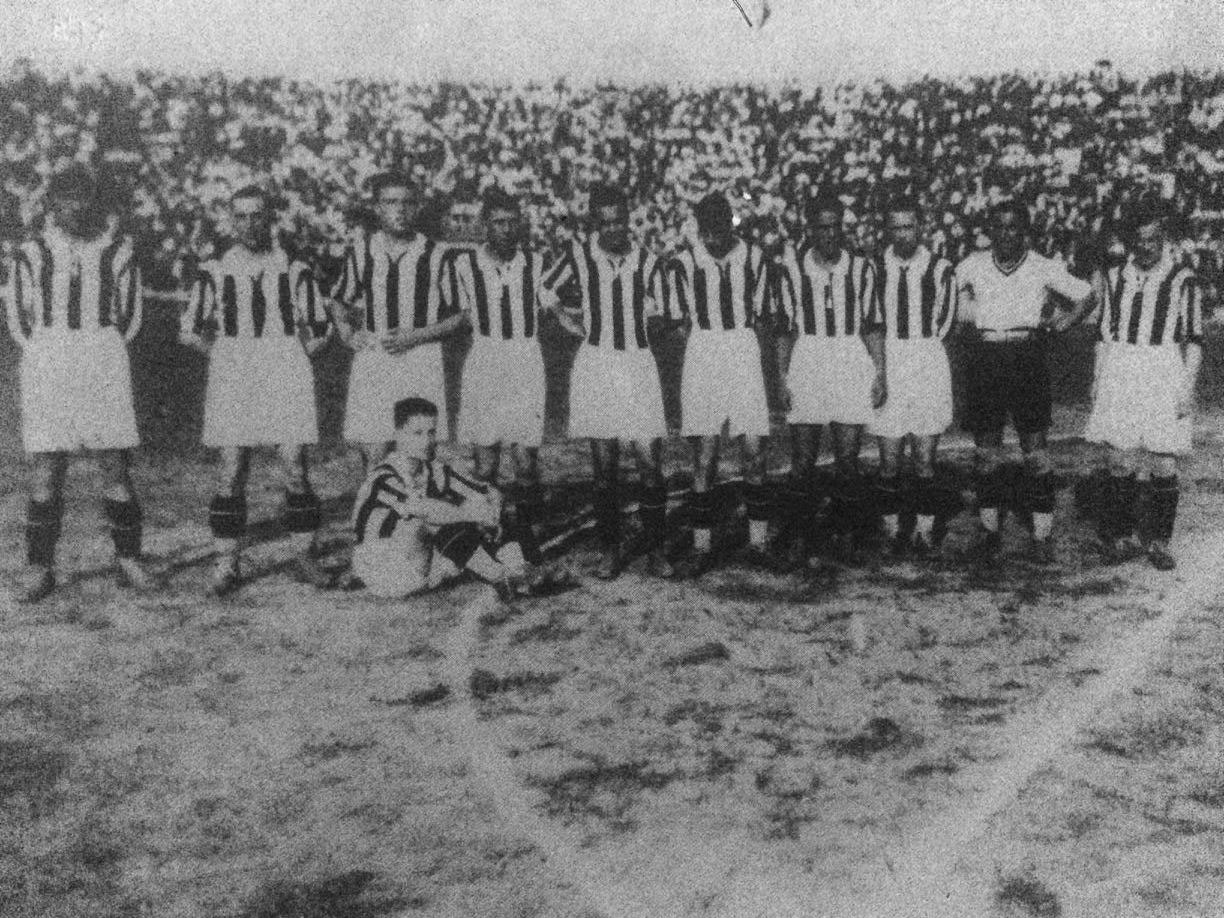
- A Juventus formation during the 1928–29 season, making its debut in international competition in the Central European Cup.
- Club: Juventus FC
- Seasons played: 62
- Most appearances: Alessandro Del Piero (130)
- Top scorer: Alessandro Del Piero (54)
- First entry: 1958–59 European Cup
- Latest entry: 2026–27 UEFA Europa League

Titles
- Champions League: 2: 1985; 1996
- Europa League: 3: 1977; 1990; 1993
- Cup Winners' Cup: 1: 1984
- Intertoto Cup: 1: 1999
- Super Cup: 2: 1984; 1996
- Intercontinental Cup: 2: 1985; 1996

Juventus Football Club first participated in a Union of European Football Associations (UEFA) competition in 1958. The first international cup in which the club took part since the advent of professionalism in Italy was the Central European Cup, an inter-association tournament where the Old Lady made its debut in 1929. That competition lasted from 1927 to 1940 and the club reached the semi-finals in five editions. From 1938 to the Torneio Internacional de Clubes Campeões in 1951, in which they gained the final, Juventus did not participate in any international championships. After the establishing of UEFA in 1954 and the creation of its first own club competitions since the following year, they have competed, as of 2022, in six out of the seven confederation tournaments. After its triumph in 1985 Intercontinental Cup, the club obtained its first world champion title and contemporaneously claimed the trophy at least once in each of then five international competitions, making the Turinese club the first and only one worldwide in reach that achievement, which was revalidated after winning the UEFA Intertoto Cup fourteen years later and remained in force until the first Europa Conference League final played in 2022.

One of the most titled clubs in the sport, Juventus is Italy's second most successful team in European competitions, sixth at continental level and twelfth with the most official international trophies won in the world, having won eleven official tournaments: the UEFA Champions League (formerly known as the European Champions' Cup) twice, European Cup Winners' Cup once, the UEFA Europa League (formerly known as the UEFA Cup) thrice, the UEFA Intertoto Cup once, the UEFA Super Cup twice and the Intercontinental Cup twice; being a finalist on nine occasions (seven in European Champions' Cup and Champions League, one in UEFA Cup and one in Intercontinental Cup), occupying the fourth position in the all-time UEFA competitions ranking, and having obtained the highest coefficient score during seven seasons since its introduction in 1979, the most for an Italian team in both. Based to these results, Juventus was recognised as Italy's best club and second in Europe of the 20th century according to the perpetual classify published in 2009 by the International Federation of Football History and Statistics (IFFHS), an organisation recognised by FIFA.

Qualification for international competitions is determined by a team's success in its national league and cup competitions from the previous season. Juventus competed at that level for 28 consecutive seasons since 1963 to 1991 (20 consecutive seasons in UEFA competitions since 1971 to 1991), more than other Italian club, winning six titles and gaining the final 11 times during that period.

Giovanni Trapattoni is the club's most successful manager at international stage, with six trophies. During his first spell in the club between the 1970s and 1980s, Juventus became the first and only Italian side to win an international competition without foreigner footballers, the first club in the history of European football to have won all three seasonal tournaments organised by the Union of European Football Associations, being also the only one to reach it with the same coach spell, and the first European club to win the Intercontinental Cup, in 1985, since it was restructured by the European confederation and Confederación Sudamericana de Fútbol (CONMEBOL)'s organizing committee five years beforehand; being awarded with The UEFA Plaque by the confederation's president Jacques Georges on 12 July 1988 at Geneva, Switzerland.

Juventus' biggest-margin win in UEFA club competitions is a 7–0 victory over Lechia Gdańsk in the 1983–84 European Cup Winners' Cup, Valur in the 1986–87 European Champions' Cup and Olympiacos in the 2003–04 UEFA Champions League. Alessandro Del Piero holds the club record for the most appearances (130) and goals scored on that stage (54).

== UEFA-organised seasonal competitions ==
Juventus' score listed first.

=== European Cup / UEFA Champions League ===
Season	Round	Opposition	Home	Away	Aggregate	Reference
1958–59	Preliminary round	(Austria) Wiener Sport-Club	3–1	0–7	3–8	
1960–61	Preliminary round	(Bulgaria) CSKA Sofia	2–0	1–4	3–4	
1961–62	Preliminary round	(Greece) Panathinaikos	2–1	1–1	3–2	
1961–62	First round	(Socialist Federal Republic of Yugoslavia) Partizan	5–0	2–1	7–1	
1961–62	Quarter-finals	(Spain) Real Madrid	0–1	1–0	2–4 (po 1–3)	
1967–68	First round	(Greece) Olympiacos	2–0	0–0	2–0	
1967–68	Second round	(Romania) Rapid București	1–0	0–0	1–0	
1967–68	Quarter-finals	(West Germany) Eintracht Braunschweig	1–0	2–3	4–3 (po 1–0)	
1967–68	Semi-finals	(Portugal) Benfica	0–1	0–2	0–3	
1972–73	First round	(France) Marseille	3–0	0–1	3–1	
1972–73	Second round	(East Germany) Magdeburg	1–0	1–0	2–0	
1972–73	Quarter-finals	(Hungary) Újpest	0–0	2–2	2–2 (a)	
1972–73	Semi-finals	(England) Derby County	3–1	0–0	3–1	
1972–73	Final	(Netherlands) Ajax	0–1			
1973–74	First round	(East Germany) Dynamo Dresden	3–2	0–2	3–4	
1975–76	First round	(Bulgaria) CSKA Sofia	2–0	1–2	3–2	
1975–76	Second round	(West Germany) Borussia Mönchengladbach	2–2	0–2	2–4	
1977–78	First round	(Cyprus) Omonia	2–0	3–0	5–0	
1977–78	Second round	(Northern Ireland) Glentoran	5–0	1–0	6–0	
1977–78	Quarter-finals	(Netherlands) Ajax	1–1	1–1	1–1 (3–0 p)	
1977–78	Semi-finals	(Belgium) Club Brugge	1–0	0–2	1–2	
1978–79	First round	(Scotland) Rangers	1–0	0–2	1–2	
1981–82	First round	(Scotland) Celtic	2–0	0–1	2–1	
1981–82	Second round	(Belgium) Anderlecht	1–1	1–3	2–4	
1982–83	First round	(Denmark) Hvidovre	3–3	4–1	7–4	
1982–83	Second round	(Belgium) Standard Liège	2–0	1–1	3–1	
1982–83	Quarter-finals	(England) Aston Villa	3–1	2–1	5–2	
1982–83	Semi-finals	(Poland) Widzew Łódź	2–0	2–2	4–2	
1982–83	Final	(West Germany) Hamburger SV	0–1			
1984–85	First round	(Finland) Ilves	2–1	4–0	6–1	
1984–85	Second round	(Switzerland) Grasshopper	2–0	4–2	6–2	
1984–85	Quarter-finals	(Czechoslovakia) Sparta Prague	3–0	0–1	3–1	
1984–85	Semi-finals	(France) Bordeaux	3–0	0–2	3–2	
1984–85	Final	(England) Liverpool	1–0			
1985–86	First round	(Luxembourg) Jeunesse Esch	4–1	5–0	9–1	
1985–86	Second round	(Italy) Hellas Verona	2–0	0–0	2–0	
1985–86	Quarter-finals	(Spain) Barcelona	1–1	0–1	1–2	
1986–87	First round	(Iceland) Valur	7–0	4–0	11–0	
1986–87	Second round	(Spain) Real Madrid	1–0	0–1	1–1 (1–3 p)	
1995–96	Group stage	(Germany) Borussia Dortmund	1–2	3–1	1st	
1995–96	Group stage	(Romania) Steaua București	3–0	0–0	1st	
1995–96	Group stage	(Scotland) Rangers	4–1	4–0	1st	
1995–96	Quarter-finals	(Spain) Real Madrid	2–0	0–1	2–1	
1995–96	Semi-finals	(France) Nantes	2–0	2–3	4–3	
1995–96	Final	(Netherlands) Ajax	1–1 (4–2 p)			
1996–97	Group stage	(England) Manchester United	1–0	1–0	1st	
1996–97	Group stage	(Turkey) Fenerbahçe	2–0	1–0	1st	
1996–97	Group stage	(Austria) Rapid Wien	5–0	1–1	1st	
1996–97	Quarter-finals	(Norway) Rosenborg	2–0	1–1	3–1	
1996–97	Semi-finals	(Netherlands) Ajax	4–1	2–1	6–2	
1996–97	Final	(Germany) Borussia Dortmund	1–3			
1997–98	Group stage	(Netherlands) Feyenoord	5–1	0–2	2nd	
1997–98	Group stage	(England) Manchester United	1–0	2–3	2nd	
1997–98	Group stage	(Slovakia) Košice	3–2	1–0	2nd	
1997–98	Quarter-finals	(Ukraine) Dynamo Kyiv	1–1	4–1	5–2	
1997–98	Semi-finals	(France) Monaco	4–1	2–3	6–4	
1997–98	Final	(Spain) Real Madrid	0–1			
1998–99	Group stage	(Turkey) Galatasaray	1–1	2–2	1st	
1998–99	Group stage	(Norway) Rosenborg	2–0	1–1	1st	
1998–99	Group stage	(Spain) Athletic Bilbao	1–1	0–0	1st	
1998–99	Quarter-finals	(Greece) Olympiacos	2–1	1–1	3–2	
1998–99	Semi-finals	(England) Manchester United	2–3	1–1	3–4	
2000–01	First group stage	(Germany) Hamburger SV	1–3	4–4	4th	
2000–01	First group stage	(Greece) Panathinaikos	2–1	1–3	4th	
2000–01	First group stage	(Spain) Deportivo La Coruña	0–0	1–1	4th	
2001–02	First group stage	(Scotland) Celtic	3–2	3–4	1st	
2001–02	First group stage	(Norway) Rosenborg	1–0	1–1	1st	
2001–02	First group stage	(Portugal) Porto	3–1	0–0	1st	
2001–02	Second group stage	(Germany) Bayer Leverkusen	4–0	1–3	4th	
2001–02	Second group stage	(England) Arsenal	1–0	1–3	4th	
2001–02	Second group stage	(Spain) Deportivo La Coruña	0–0	0–2	4th	
2002–03	First group stage	(Netherlands) Feyenoord	2–0	1–1	1st	
2002–03	First group stage	(Ukraine) Dynamo Kyiv	5–0	2–1	1st	
2002–03	First group stage	(England) Newcastle United	2–0	0–1	1st	
2002–03	Second group stage	(Spain) Deportivo La Coruña	3–2	2–2	2nd	
2002–03	Second group stage	(Switzerland) Basel	4–0	1–2	2nd	
2002–03	Second group stage	(England) Manchester United	0–3	1–2	2nd	
2002–03	Quarter-finals	(Spain) Barcelona	1–1	2–1	3–2	
2002–03	Semi-finals	(Spain) Real Madrid	3–1	1–2	4–3	
2002–03	Final	(Italy) Milan	0–0 (2–3 p)			
2003–04	Group stage	(Turkey) Galatasaray	2–1	0–2 (N)	1st	
2003–04	Group stage	(Greece) Olympiacos	7–0	2–1	1st	
2003–04	Group stage	(Spain) Real Sociedad	4–2	0–0	1st	
2003–04	Round of 16	(Spain) Deportivo La Coruña	0–1	0–1	0–2	
2004–05	Third qualifying round	(Sweden) Djurgården	2–2	4–1	6–3	
2004–05	Group stage	(Netherlands) Ajax	1–0	1–0	1st	
2004–05	Group stage	(Israel) Maccabi Tel Aviv	1–0	1–1	1st	
2004–05	Group stage	(Germany) Bayern Munich	1–0	1–0	1st	
2004–05	Round of 16	(Spain) Real Madrid	2–0	0–1	2–1	
2004–05	Quarter-finals	(England) Liverpool	0–0	1–2	1–2	
2005–06	Group stage	(Belgium) Club Brugge	1–0	2–1	1st	
2005–06	Group stage	(Austria) Rapid Wien	3–0	3–1	1st	
2005–06	Group stage	(Germany) Bayern Munich	2–1	1–2	1st	
2005–06	Round of 16	(Germany) Werder Bremen	2–1	2–3	4–4 (a)	
2005–06	Quarter-finals	(England) Arsenal	0–0	0–2	0–2	
2008–09	Third qualifying round	(Slovakia) Artmedia Bratislava	4–0	1–1	5–1	
2008–09	Group stage	(Russia) Zenit Saint Petersburg	1–0	0–0	1st	
2008–09	Group stage	(Belarus) BATE Borisov	0–0	2–2	1st	
2008–09	Group stage	(Spain) Real Madrid	2–1	2–0	1st	
2008–09	Round of 16	(England) Chelsea	2–2	0–1	2–3	
2009–10	Group stage	(France) Bordeaux	1–1	0–2	3rd	
2009–10	Group stage	(Germany) Bayern Munich	1–4	0–0	3rd	
2009–10	Group stage	(Israel) Maccabi Haifa	1–0	1–0	3rd	
2012–13	Group stage	(England) Chelsea	3–0	2–2	1st	
2012–13	Group stage	(Ukraine) Shakhtar Donetsk	1–1	1–0	1st	
2012–13	Group stage	(Denmark) Nordsjælland	4–0	1–1	1st	
2012–13	Round of 16	(Scotland) Celtic	2–0	3–0	5–0	
2012–13	Quarter-finals	(Germany) Bayern Munich	0–2	0–2	0–4	
2013–14	Group stage	(Denmark) Copenhagen	3–1	1–1	3rd	
2013–14	Group stage	(Turkey) Galatasaray	2–2	0–1	3rd	
2013–14	Group stage	(Spain) Real Madrid	2–2	1–2	3rd	
2014–15	Group stage	(Sweden) Malmö FF	2–0	2–0	2nd	
2014–15	Group stage	(Spain) Atlético Madrid	0–0	0–1	2nd	
2014–15	Group stage	(Greece) Olympiacos	3–2	0–1	2nd	
2014–15	Round of 16	(Germany) Borussia Dortmund	2–1	3–0	5–1	
2014–15	Quarter-finals	(France) Monaco	1–0	0–0	1–0	
2014–15	Semi-finals	(Spain) Real Madrid	2–1	1–1	3–2	
2014–15	Final	(Spain) Barcelona	1–3			
2015–16	Group stage	(England) Manchester City	1–0	2–1	2nd	
2015–16	Group stage	(Spain) Sevilla	2–0	0–1	2nd	
2015–16	Group stage	(Germany) Borussia Mönchengladbach	0–0	1–1	2nd	
2015–16	Round of 16	(Germany) Bayern Munich	2–2	2–4 (a.e.t.)	4–6	
2016–17	Group stage	(Spain) Sevilla	0–0	3–1	1st	
2016–17	Group stage	(Croatia) Dinamo Zagreb	2–0	4–0	1st	
2016–17	Group stage	(France) Lyon	1–1	1–0	1st	
2016–17	Round of 16	(Portugal) Porto	1–0	2–0	3–0	
2016–17	Quarter-finals	(Spain) Barcelona	3–0	0–0	3–0	
2016–17	Semi-finals	(France) Monaco	2–1	2–0	4–1	
2016–17	Final	(Spain) Real Madrid	1–4			
2017–18	Group stage	(Spain) Barcelona	0–0	0–3	2nd	
2017–18	Group stage	(Greece) Olympiacos	2–0	2–0	2nd	
2017–18	Group stage	(Portugal) Sporting CP	2–1	1–1	2nd	
2017–18	Round of 16	(England) Tottenham Hotspur	2–2	2–1	4–3	
2017–18	Quarter-finals	(Spain) Real Madrid	0–3	3–1	3–4	
2018–19	Group stage	(Spain) Valencia	1–0	2–0	1st	
2018–19	Group stage	(Switzerland) Young Boys	3–0	1–2	1st	
2018–19	Group stage	(England) Manchester United	1–2	1–0	1st	
2018–19	Round of 16	(Spain) Atlético Madrid	3–0	0–2	3–2	
2018–19	Quarter-finals	(Netherlands) Ajax	1–2	1–1	2–3	
2019–20	Group stage	(Spain) Atlético Madrid	1–0	2–2	1st	
2019–20	Group stage	(Germany) Bayer Leverkusen	3–0	2–0	1st	
2019–20	Group stage	(Russia) Lokomotiv Moscow	2–1	2–1	1st	
2019–20	Round of 16	(France) Lyon	2–1	0–1	2–2 (a)	
2020–21	Group stage	(Ukraine) Dynamo Kyiv	3–0	2–0	1st	
2020–21	Group stage	(Spain) Barcelona	0–2	3–0	1st	
2020–21	Group stage	(Hungary) Ferencváros	2–1	4–1	1st	
2020–21	Round of 16	(Portugal) Porto	3–2 (a.e.t.)	1–2	4–4 (a)	
2021–22	Group stage	(Sweden) Malmö FF	1–0	3–0	1st	
2021–22	Group stage	(England) Chelsea	1–0	0–4	1st	
2021–22	Group stage	(Russia) Zenit Saint Petersburg	4–2	1–0	1st	
2021–22	Round of 16	(Spain) Villarreal	0–3	1–1	1–4	
2022–23	Group stage	(France) Paris Saint-Germain	1–2	1–2	3rd	
2022–23	Group stage	(Portugal) Benfica	1–2	3–4	3rd	
2022–23	Group stage	(Israel) Maccabi Haifa	3–1	0–2	3rd	
2024–25	League phase	(Netherlands) PSV Eindhoven	3–1	—N/a	20th	
2024–25	League phase	(Germany) RB Leipzig	—N/a	3–2	20th	
2024–25	League phase	(Germany) VfB Stuttgart	0–1	—N/a	20th	
2024–25	League phase	(France) Lille	—N/a	1–1	20th	
2024–25	League phase	(England) Aston Villa	—N/a	0–0	20th	
2024–25	League phase	(England) Manchester City	2–0	—N/a	20th	
2024–25	League phase	(Belgium) Club Brugge	—N/a	0–0	20th	
2024–25	League phase	(Portugal) Benfica	0–2	—N/a	20th	
2024–25	Knockout phase play-offs	(Netherlands) PSV Eindhoven	2–1	1–3 (a.e.t.)	3–4	
2025–26	League phase	(Germany) Borussia Dortmund	4–4	—N/a	13th	
2025–26	League phase	(Spain) Villarreal	—N/a	2–2	13th	
2025–26	League phase	(Spain) Real Madrid	—N/a	0–1	13th	
2025–26	League phase	(Portugal) Sporting CP	1–1	—N/a	13th	
2025–26	League phase	(Norway) Bodø/Glimt	—N/a	3–2	13th	
2025–26	League phase	(Cyprus) Pafos	2–0	—N/a	13th	
2025–26	League phase	(Portugal) Benfica	2–0	—N/a	13th	
2025–26	League phase	(France) Monaco	—N/a	0–0	13th	
2025–26	Knockout phase play-offs	(Turkey) Galatasaray	3–2 (a.e.t.)	2–5	5–7	

=== European Cup Winners' Cup ===
Season	Round	Opposition	Home	Away	Aggregate	Reference
1965–66	First round	(England) Liverpool	1–0	0–2	1–2	
1979–80	First round	(Hungary) Győri	2–0	1–2	3–2	
1979–80	Second round	(Bulgaria) Beroe	3–0	0–1	3–1	
1979–80	Quarter-finals	(Socialist Federal Republic of Yugoslavia) Rijeka	2–0	0–0	2–0	
1979–80	Semi-finals	(England) Arsenal	0–1	1–1	1–2	
1983–84	First round	(Poland) Lechia Gdańsk	7–0	3–2	10–2	
1983–84	Second round	(France) Paris Saint-Germain	0–0	2–2	2–2 (a)	
1983–84	Quarter-finals	(Finland) Haka	1–0	1–0	2–0	
1983–84	Semi-finals	(England) Manchester United	2–1	1–1	3–2	
1983–84	Final	(Portugal) Porto	2–1			
1990–91	First round	(Bulgaria) Sliven	6–1	2–0	8–1	
1990–91	Second round	Austria Wien	4–0	3–0	7–0	
1990–91	Quarter-finals	(Belgium) Liège	3–0	3–1	6–1	
1990–91	Semi-finals	(Spain) Barcelona	1–0	1–3	2–3	

=== UEFA Cup / UEFA Europa League ===
Season	Round	Club	Home	Away	Aggregate	Reference
1971–72	First round	(Malta) Marsa	5–0	6–0	11–0	
1971–72	Second round	(Scotland) Aberdeen	2–0	1–1	3–1	
1971–72	Third round	(Austria) Rapid Wien	4–1	1–0	5–1	
1971–72	Quarter-finals	(England) Wolverhampton Wanderers	1–1	1–2	2–3	
1974–75	First round	(East Germany) Vorwärts Frankfurt	3–0	1–2	4–2	
1974–75	Second round	(Scotland) Hibernian	4–0	4–2	8–2	
1974–75	Third round	(Netherlands) Ajax	1–0	1–2	2–2 (a)	
1974–75	Quarter-finals	(West Germany) Hamburger SV	2–0	0–0	2–0	
1974–75	Semi-finals	(Netherlands) Twente	0–1	1–3	1–4	
1976–77	First round	(England) Manchester City	2–0	0–1	2–1	
1976–77	Second round	(England) Manchester United	3–0	0–1	3–1	
1976–77	Third round	(Soviet Union) Shakhtar Donetsk	3–0	0–1	3–1	
1976–77	Quarter-finals	(East Germany) Magdeburg	1–0	3–1	4–1	
1976–77	Semi-finals	(Greece) AEK Athens	4–1	1–0	5–1	
1976–77	Final	(Spain) Athletic Bilbao	1–0	1–2	2–2 (a)	
1980–81	First round	(Greece) Panathinaikos	4–0	2–4	6–4	
1980–81	Second round	(Poland) Widzew Łódź	3–1	1–3	4–4 (1–4 p)	
1987–88	First round	(Malta) Valletta	3–0	4–0	7–0	
1987–88	Second round	(Greece) Panathinaikos	3–2	0–1	3–3 (a)	
1988–89	First round	(Romania) Oțelul Galați	5–0	0–1	5–1	
1988–89	Second round	(Spain) Athletic Bilbao	5–1	2–3	7–4	
1988–89	Third round	(Belgium) Liège	1–0	1–0	2–0	
1988–89	Quarter-finals	(Italy) Napoli	2–0	0–3 (a.e.t.)	2–3	
1989–90	First round	(Poland) Górnik Zabrze	4–2	1–0	5–2	
1989–90	Second round	(France) Paris Saint-Germain	2–1	1–0	3–1	
1989–90	Third round	(East Germany) FC Karl-Marx-Stadt	2–1	1–0	3–1	
1989–90	Quarter-finals	(West Germany) Hamburger SV	1–2	2–0	3–2	
1989–90	Semi-finals	(West Germany) 1. FC Köln	3–2	0–0	3–2	
1989–90	Final	(Italy) Fiorentina	3–1	0–0	3–1	
1992–93	First round	(Cyprus) Anorthosis Famagusta	6–1	4–0	10–1	
1992–93	Second round	(Greece) Panathinaikos	0–0	1–0	1–0	
1992–93	Third round	(Czechoslovakia) Sigma Olomouc	5–0	2–1	7–1	
1992–93	Quarter-finals	(Portugal) Benfica	3–0	1–2	4–2	
1992–93	Semi-finals	(France) Paris Saint-Germain	2–1	1–0	3–1	
1992–93	Final	(Germany) Borussia Dortmund	3–0	3–1	6–1	
1993–94	First round	(Russia) Lokomotiv Moscow	3–0	1–0	4–0	
1993–94	Second round	(Norway) Kongsvinger	2–0	1–1	3–1	
1993–94	Third round	(Spain) Tenerife	3–0	1–2	4–2	
1993–94	Quarter-finals	(Italy) Cagliari	1–2	0–1	1–3	
1994–95	First round	(Bulgaria) CSKA Sofia	5–1	3–0	8–1	
1994–95	Second round	(Portugal) Marítimo	2–1	1–0	3–1	
1994–95	Third round	(Austria) Admira Wacker	2–1	3–1	5–2	
1994–95	Quarter-finals	(Germany) Eintracht Frankfurt	3–0	1–1	4–1	
1994–95	Semi-finals	(Germany) Borussia Dortmund	2–2	2–1	4–3	
1994–95	Final	(Italy) Parma	1–1	0–1	1–2	
1999–2000	First round	(Cyprus) Omonia	5–0	5–2	10–2	
1999–2000	Second round	(Bulgaria) Levski Sofia	1–1	3–1	4–2	
1999–2000	Third round	(Greece) Olympiacos	1–2	3–1	4–3	
1999–2000	Fourth round	(Spain) Celta Vigo	1–0	0–4	1–4	
2009–10	Round of 32	(Netherlands) Ajax	0–0	2–1	2–1	
2009–10	Round of 16	(England) Fulham	3–1	1–4	4–5	
2010–11	Third qualifying round	(Republic of Ireland) Shamrock Rovers	1–0	2–0	3–0	
2010–11	Play-off round	(Austria) Sturm Graz	1–0	2–1	3–1	
2010–11	Group stage	(Poland) Lech Poznań	3–3	1–1	3rd	
2010–11	Group stage	(England) Manchester City	1–1	1–1	3rd	
2010–11	Group stage	(Austria) Red Bull Salzburg	0–0	1–1	3rd	
2013–14	Round of 32	(Turkey) Trabzonspor	2–0	2–0	4–0	
2013–14	Round of 16	(Italy) Fiorentina	1–1	1–0	2–1	
2013–14	Quarter-finals	(France) Lyon	2–1	1–0	3–1	
2013–14	Semi-finals	(Portugal) Benfica	0–0	1–2	1–2	
2022–23	Knockout round play-offs	(France) Nantes	1–1	3–0	4–1	
2022–23	Round of 16	(Germany) SC Freiburg	1–0	2–0	3–0	
2022–23	Quarter-finals	(Portugal) Sporting CP	1–0	1–1	2–1	
2022–23	Semi-finals	(Spain) Sevilla	1–1	1–2 (a.e.t.)	2–3	
2026–27	League phase	(Netherlands) NEC	5–0	—N/a		
2026–27	League phase	(Spain) Celta Vigo	—N/a	2–1		
2026–27	League phase	(France) Rennes		—N/a		
2026–27	League phase	(Netherlands) AZ	—N/a			
2026–27	League phase	(Cyprus) Omonia		—N/a		
2026–27	League phase	(Israel) Hapoel Be'er Sheva	—N/a			
2026–27	League phase	(Hungary) Ferencváros	—N/a			
2026–27	League phase	(Spain) Real Sociedad		—N/a		

=== European Super Cup / UEFA Super Cup ===
Edition	Opposition	Home	Away	Aggregate	Reference
1984	(England) Liverpool	2–0			
1996	(France) Paris Saint-Germain	3–1	6–1	9–2	

=== UEFA Intertoto Cup ===
Season	Round	Opposition	Home	Away	Aggregate	Reference
1999	Third round	(Romania) Ceahlăul Piatra Neamţ	0–0	1–1	1–1 (a)	
1999	Semi-finals	(Russia) Rostsel'maš	5–1	4–0	9–1	
1999	Final	(France) Rennes	2–0	2–2	4–2	

== UEFA-CONMEBOL competitions ==
=== Intercontinental Cup ===
Edition	Round	Opposition	Score
1973	Final	(Argentina) Independiente	0–1
1985	Final	(Argentina) Argentinos Juniors	2–2 (4–2 p)
1996	Final	(Argentina) River Plate	1–0

== FIFA competitions ==
=== FIFA Club World Cup ===
Edition	Round	Opposition	Score
2025	Group stage	(United Arab Emirates) Al Ain	5–0
2025	Group stage	(Morocco) Wydad AC	4–1
2025	Group stage	(England) Manchester City	2–5
2025	Round of 16	(Spain) Real Madrid	0–1

== Non-UEFA organised seasonal competitions ==
=== Inter-Cities Fairs Cup ===
Season	Round	Opposition	Home	Away	Aggregate
1963–64	First round	(Socialist Federal Republic of Yugoslavia) OFK Beograd	2–1	1–2	3–3 (po 1–0)
1963–64	Second round	(Spain) Atlético Madrid	1–0	2–1	3–1
1963–64	Quarter-finals	(Spain) Zaragoza	0–0	2–3	2–3
1964–65	First round	(Belgium) Union Saint-Gilloise	1–0	1–0	2–0
1964–65	Second round	(France) Stade Français	1–0	0–0	1–0
1964–65	Third round	(Bulgaria) Lokomotiv Plovdiv	1–1	1–1	4–3 (po 2–1)
1964–65	Quarter-finals	Given bye			
1964–65	Semi-finals	(Spain) Atlético Madrid	3–1	1–3	7–5 (po 3–1)
1964–65	Final	(Hungary) Ferencváros	0–1		
1966–67	First round	(Greece) Aris Thessaloniki	5–0	2–0	7–0
1966–67	Second round	(Portugal) Vitória de Setúbal	3–1	2–0	5–1
1966–67	Third round	(Scotland) Dundee United	3–0	0–1	3–1
1966–67	Quarter-finals	(Socialist Federal Republic of Yugoslavia) Dinamo Zagreb	2–2	0–3	2–5
1968–69	First round	(Switzerland) Lausanne-Sport	2–0	2–0	4–0
1968–69	Second round	(West Germany) Eintracht Frankfurt	0–0	0–1 (a.e.t.)	0–1
1969–70	First round	(Bulgaria) Lokomotiv Plovdiv	3–1	2–1	5–2
1969–70	Second round	(West Germany) Hertha BSC	0–0	1–3	1–3
1970–71	First round	(Luxembourg) US Rumelange	7–0	4–0	11–0
1970–71	Second round	(Spain) Barcelona	2–1	2–1	4–2
1970–71	Third round	(Hungary) Pécsi MFC	2–0	1–0	3–0
1970–71	Quarter-finals	(Netherlands) Twente	2–0	2–2 (a.e.t.)	4–2
1970–71	Semi-finals	(West Germany) 1. FC Köln	2–0	1–1	3–1
1970–71	Final	(England) Leeds United	2–2	1–1	3–3 (a)

== Non-UEFA organised summer competitions ==
=== Central European Cup/Mitropa Cup ===
Season	Round	Opposition	Home	Away	Aggregate
1929	Quarter-finals	(Czechoslovakia) Slavia Prague	1–0	0–3	1–3
1931	Quarter-finals	(Czechoslovakia) Sparta Prague	2–1	0–1	2–2 (po 2–3)
1932	Quarter-finals	(Hungary) Ferencváros	4–0	3–3	7–3
1932	Semi-finals	(Czechoslovakia) Slavia Prague	0–4	2–0^{1}	–
1933	Quarter-finals	(Hungary) Újpest	4–2	6–2	10–4
1933	Semi-finals	Austria Wien	0–3	1–1	1–4
1934	First round	(Czechoslovakia) Teplicky FK	4–2	1–0	5–2
1934	Quarter-finals	(Hungary) Újpest	3–1	1–1	4–2
1934	Semi-finals	(Federal State of Austria) Admira Wien	1–3	2–1	3–4
1935	First round	(Czechoslovakia) Viktoria Plzeň	3–3	5–1	8–4
1935	Quarter-finals	(Hungary) MTK Budapest	3–1	1–1	4–2
1935	Semi-finals	(Czechoslovakia) Sparta Prague	0–2	3–1	3–3 (po 1–5)
1938	First round	(Hungary) MTK Budapest	3–3	6–1	9–4
1938	Quarter-finals	(Czechoslovakia) Kladno	4–2	2–1	6–3
1938	Semi-finals	(Hungary) Ferencváros	3–2	0–2	3–4
1962	Group 1	(Socialist Federal Republic of Yugoslavia) Dinamo Zagreb	4–1	1–2	3rd
1962	Group 1	(Czechoslovakia) Hradec Králové	3–2	0–2	3rd
1962	Group 1	(Hungary) Ferencváros	1–0	1–1	3rd

^{1} The match was abandoned with Juventus leading 2–0 after the crowd, enraged Slavia had conceded two quick goals in the match and resorted to obstruction and time wasting, threw stones onto the pitch. After a stone hit and seriously injured Slavia goalkeeper František Plánička, Slavia's team walked off; both teams' fans invaded the pitch in response, leaving Slavia pinned in their dressing rooms for hours while 1,500 soldiers and policemen formed a cordon. Slavia Prague and Juventus were both ejected from the competition.

=== Latin Cup ===
Season	Round	Opposition	Score
1952	Semi-finals	(Spain) Barcelona	2–4
1952	Third place match	(Portugal) Sporting CP	3–2

== Overall record ==
=== By competition ===
As of 15 October 2026.

UEFA competitions includes European Champions' Cup and Champions League, UEFA Cup Winners' Cup, UEFA Cup and Europa League, UEFA Intertoto Cup, UEFA Super Cup and Intercontinental Cup.

Competition	Pld	W	D	L	GF	GA	GD	Win%
European Champions' Cup / UEFA Champions League	321	161	77	83	510	329	+181	50.16
UEFA Cup Winners' Cup	27	17	5	5	53	19	+34	62.96
UEFA Cup / UEFA Europa League	130	81	23	26	247	107	+140	62.31
Inter-Cities Fairs Cup	46	27	11	8	78	37	+41	58.70
UEFA Super Cup	3	3	0	0	11	2	+9	100.00
UEFA Intertoto Cup	6	3	3	0	14	4	+10	50.00
Intercontinental Cup	3	1	1	1	3	3	+0	33.33
FIFA Club World Cup	4	2	0	2	11	7	+4	50.00
UEFA competitions total	490	266	109	115	838	464	+374	54.29
Total	540	295	120	125	927	508	+419	54.63

Source: UEFA.com
Pld = Matches played; W = Matches won; D = Matches drawn; L = Matches lost; GF = Goals for; GA = Goals against; GD = Goal Difference.

- UEFA club competitions all-time ranking (since 1955): 4th place (Italian record)
- UEFA coefficient most top-ranked club by 5-year period (since 1975–1979): 7 times (Italian record)

=== By club ===
As of 15 October 2026

Club	Country	Pld	W	D	L	GF	GA	GD	Win%
Aberdeen	(Scotland)	2	1	1	0	3	1	+2	50.00
Admira Wacker	(Austria)	2	2	0	0	5	2	+3	100.00
AEK Athens	(Greece)	2	2	0	0	5	1	+4	100.00
Ajax	(Netherlands)	14	6	5	3	17	12	+5	42.86
Al Ain	(United Arab Emirates)	1	1	0	0	5	0	+5	100.00
Anderlecht	(Belgium)	2	0	1	1	2	4	−2	0.00
Anorthosis Famagusta	(Cyprus)	2	2	0	0	10	1	+9	100.00
Argentinos Juniors	(Argentina)	1	0	1	0	2	2	+0	0.00
Aris Thessaloniki	(Greece)	2	2	0	0	7	0	+7	100.00
Arsenal	(England)	6	1	2	3	3	7	−4	16.67
Artmedia Bratislava	(Slovakia)	2	1	1	0	5	1	+4	50.00
Aston Villa	(England)	3	2	1	0	5	2	+3	66.67
Athletic Bilbao	(Spain)	6	2	2	2	10	7	+3	33.33
Atlético Madrid	(Spain)	10	5	2	3	16	12	+4	50.00
Austria Wien	(Austria)	2	2	0	0	7	0	+7	100.00
Barcelona	(Spain)	15	6	4	5	17	17	+0	40.00
Basel	(Switzerland)	2	1	0	1	5	2	+3	50.00
BATE Borisov	(Belarus)	2	0	2	0	2	2	+0	0.00
Bayer Leverkusen	(Germany)	4	3	0	1	10	3	+7	75.00
Bayern Munich	(Germany)	10	3	2	5	10	17	−7	30.00
Benfica	(Portugal)	10	2	1	7	11	15	−4	20.00
Beroe	(Bulgaria)	2	1	0	1	3	1	+2	50.00
Bodø/Glimt	(Norway)	1	1	0	0	3	2	+1	100.00
Bordeaux	(France)	4	1	1	2	4	5	−1	25.00
Borussia Dortmund	(Germany)	10	6	2	2	24	15	+9	60.00
Borussia Mönchengladbach	(Germany)	4	0	3	1	3	5	−2	0.00
Cagliari	(Italy)	2	0	0	2	1	3	−2	0.00
Ceahlăul	(Romania)	2	0	2	0	1	1	+0	0.00
Celta Vigo	(Spain)	3	2	0	1	3	5	−2	66.67
Celtic	(Scotland)	6	4	0	2	13	7	+6	66.67
Chelsea	(England)	6	2	2	2	8	9	−1	33.33
Club Brugge	(Belgium)	5	3	1	1	4	3	+1	60.00
Copenhagen	(Denmark)	2	1	1	0	4	2	+2	50.00
CSKA Sofia	(Bulgaria)	6	4	0	2	14	7	+7	66.67
Deportivo La Coruña	(Spain)	8	1	4	3	6	9	−3	12.50
Derby County	(England)	2	1	1	0	3	1	+2	50.00
Djurgården	(Sweden)	2	1	1	0	6	3	+3	50.00
Dundee United	(Scotland)	2	1	0	1	3	1	+2	50.00
Dynamo Dresden	(East Germany)	2	1	0	1	3	4	−1	50.00
Dynamo Kyiv	(Ukraine)	6	5	1	0	17	3	+14	83.33
Dinamo Zagreb	(Croatia)	4	2	1	1	8	5	+3	50.00
Eintracht Braunschweig	(Germany)	3	2	0	1	4	3	+1	66.67
Eintracht Frankfurt	(Germany)	4	1	2	1	4	2	+2	25.00
Fenerbahçe	(Turkey)	2	2	0	0	3	0	+3	100.00
Ferencváros	(Hungary)	3	2	0	1	6	3	+3	66.67
Feyenoord	(Netherlands)	4	2	1	1	8	4	+4	50.00
Fiorentina	(Italy)	4	2	2	0	5	2	+3	50.00
SC Freiburg	(Germany)	2	2	0	0	3	0	+3	100.00
Fulham	(England)	2	1	0	1	4	5	−1	50.00
Galatasaray	(Turkey)	8	2	3	3	12	16	−4	25.00
Glentoran	(Northern Ireland)	2	2	0	0	6	0	+6	100.00
Górnik Zabrze	(Poland)	2	2	0	0	5	2	+3	100.00
Grasshopper	(Switzerland)	2	2	0	0	6	2	+4	100.00
Győri	(Hungary)	2	1	0	1	3	2	+1	50.00
Haka	(Finland)	2	2	0	0	2	0	+2	100.00
Hamburger SV	(Germany)	7	2	2	3	10	10	+0	28.57
Hellas Verona	(Italy)	2	1	1	0	2	0	+2	50.00
Hertha BSC	(Germany)	2	0	1	1	1	3	−2	0.00
Hibernian	(Scotland)	2	2	0	0	8	2	+6	100.00
Hvidovre	(Denmark)	2	1	1	0	7	4	+3	50.00
Ilves	(Finland)	2	2	0	0	6	1	+5	100.00
Independiente	(Argentina)	1	0	0	1	0	1	−1	0.00
Jeunesse Esch	(Luxembourg)	2	2	0	0	9	1	+8	100.00
Karl-Marx-Stadt	(East Germany)	2	2	0	0	3	1	+2	100.00
1. FC Köln	(Germany)	4	2	2	0	6	3	+3	50.00
Kongsvinger	(Norway)	2	1	1	0	3	1	+2	50.00
Košice	(Slovakia)	2	2	0	0	4	2	+2	100.00
Lausanne	(Switzerland)	2	2	0	0	4	0	+4	100.00
Lech Poznań	(Poland)	2	0	2	0	4	4	+0	0.00
Lechia Gdańsk	(Poland)	2	2	0	0	10	2	+8	100.00
Leeds United	(England)	2	0	2	0	3	3	+0	0.00
Levski Sofia	(Bulgaria)	2	1	1	0	4	2	+2	50.00
Liège	(Belgium)	4	4	0	0	8	1	+7	100.00
Lille	(France)	1	0	1	0	1	1	+0	0.00
Liverpool	(England)	6	3	1	2	5	4	+1	50.00
Lokomotiv Moscow	(Russia)	4	4	0	0	8	2	+6	100.00
Lokomotiv Plovdiv	(Bulgaria)	5	3	2	0	9	5	+4	60.00
Lyon	(France)	6	4	1	1	7	4	+3	66.67
Maccabi Haifa	(Israel)	4	3	0	1	5	3	+2	75.00
Maccabi Tel Aviv	(Israel)	2	1	1	0	2	1	+1	50.00
1. FC Magdeburg	(East Germany)	4	4	0	0	6	1	+5	100.00
Malmö FF	(Sweden)	4	4	0	0	8	0	+8	100.00
Manchester City	(England)	8	4	2	2	11	9	+2	50.00
Manchester United	(England)	14	6	2	6	17	17	+0	42.86
Marítimo	(Portugal)	2	2	0	0	3	1	+2	100.00
Marsa	(Malta)	2	2	0	0	11	0	+11	100.00
Marseille	(France)	2	1	0	1	3	1	+2	50.00
Milan	(Italy)	1	0	1	0	0	0	+0	0.00
Monaco	(France)	7	4	2	1	11	5	+6	57.14
Nantes	(France)	4	2	1	1	8	4	+4	50.00
Napoli	(Italy)	2	1	0	1	2	3	−1	50.00
NEC	(Netherlands)	1	1	0	0	5	0	+5	100.00
Newcastle United	(England)	2	1	0	1	2	1	+1	50.00
Nordsjælland	(Denmark)	2	1	1	0	5	1	+4	50.00
OFK Beograd	(Serbia)	2	1	0	1	3	3	+0	50.00
Olympiacos	(Greece)	12	8	2	2	25	9	+16	66.67
Omonia	(Cyprus)	4	4	0	0	15	2	+13	100.00
Oțelul Galați	(Romania)	2	1	0	1	5	1	+4	50.00
Pafos	(Cyprus)	1	1	0	0	2	0	+2	100.00
Panathinaikos	(Greece)	10	5	2	3	16	13	+3	50.00
Paris Saint-Germain	(France)	10	6	2	2	19	10	+9	60.00
Parma	(Italy)	2	0	1	1	1	2	−1	0.00
Partizan	(Serbia)	2	2	0	0	7	1	+6	100.00
Pécsi	(Hungary)	2	2	0	0	3	0	+3	100.00
Porto	(Portugal)	7	5	1	1	12	6	+6	71.43
PSV Eindhoven	(Netherlands)	3	2	0	1	6	5	+1	66.67
Rangers	(Scotland)	4	3	0	1	9	3	+6	75.00
Rapid București	(Romania)	2	1	1	0	1	0	+1	50.00
Rapid Wien	(Austria)	6	5	1	0	17	3	+14	83.33
RB Leipzig	(Germany)	1	1	0	0	3	2	+1	100.00
Real Madrid	(Spain)	23	9	2	12	25	28	−3	39.13
Real Sociedad	(Spain)	2	1	1	0	4	2	+2	50.00
Red Bull Salzburg	(Austria)	2	0	2	0	1	1	+0	0.00
Rennes	(France)	2	1	1	0	4	2	+2	50.00
Rijeka	(Croatia)	2	1	1	0	2	0	+2	50.00
River Plate	(Argentina)	1	1	0	0	1	0	+1	100.00
Rostsel'maš	(Russia)	2	2	0	0	9	1	+8	100.00
Rosenborg	(Norway)	6	3	3	0	8	3	+5	50.00
SK Sigma Olomouc	(Czech Republic)	2	2	0	0	7	1	+6	100.00
Sevilla	(Spain)	6	2	2	2	7	5	+2	33.33
Shakhtar Donetsk	(Ukraine)	4	2	1	1	5	2	+3	50.00
Shamrock Rovers	(Republic of Ireland)	2	2	0	0	3	0	+3	100.00
Sliven	(Bulgaria)	2	2	0	0	8	1	+7	100.00
Sparta Prague	(Czech Republic)	2	1	0	1	3	1	+2	50.00
Sporting CP	(Portugal)	5	2	3	0	6	4	+2	40.00
Stade Français	(France)	2	1	1	0	1	0	+1	50.00
Standard Liège	(Belgium)	2	1	1	0	3	1	+2	50.00
Steaua București	(Romania)	2	1	1	0	3	0	+3	50.00
Sturm Graz	(Austria)	2	2	0	0	3	1	+2	100.00
VfB Stuttgart	(Germany)	1	0	0	1	0	1	−1	0.00
Tenerife	(Spain)	2	1	0	1	4	2	+2	50.00
Tottenham Hotspur	(England)	2	1	1	0	4	3	+1	50.00
Trabzonspor	(Turkey)	2	2	0	0	4	0	+4	100.00
Twente	(Netherlands)	4	1	1	2	5	6	−1	25.00
US Rumelange	(Luxembourg)	2	2	0	0	11	0	+11	100.00
Union Saint-Gilloise	(Belgium)	2	2	0	0	2	0	+2	100.00
Újpest	(Hungary)	2	0	2	0	2	2	+0	0.00
Valencia	(Spain)	2	2	0	0	3	0	+3	100.00
Valletta	(Malta)	2	2	0	0	7	0	+7	100.00
Valur	(Iceland)	2	2	0	0	11	0	+11	100.00
Vitória	(Portugal)	2	2	0	0	5	1	+4	100.00
Villarreal	(Spain)	3	0	2	1	3	6	−3	0.00
Vorwärts Frankfurt	(East Germany)	2	1	0	1	4	2	+2	50.00
Wiener Sport-Club	(Austria)	2	1	0	1	3	8	−5	50.00
Werder Bremen	(Germany)	2	1	0	1	4	4	+0	50.00
Widzew Łódź	(Poland)	4	2	1	1	8	6	+2	50.00
Wolverhampton Wanderers	(England)	2	0	1	1	2	3	−1	0.00
Wydad AC	(Morocco)	1	1	0	0	4	1	+3	100.00
Young Boys	(Switzerland)	2	1	0	1	4	2	+2	50.00
Zaragoza	(Spain)	2	0	1	1	2	3	−1	0.00
Zenit Saint Petersburg	(Russia)	4	3	1	0	6	2	+4	75.00

=== By country ===
As of 15 October 2026.

Key

Positive balance (more wins than losses)
Neutral balance (as many wins as losses)
Negative balance (more losses than wins)

Country	Pld	W	D	L	GF	GA	GD	Win%
Argentina	3	1	1	1	3	3	+0	33.33
Austria	20	13	4	3	41	23	+18	65.00
Belarus	2	0	2	0	2	2	+0	0.00
Belgium	15	10	3	2	19	9	+10	66.67
Bulgaria	17	11	3	3	38	16	+22	64.71
Croatia	8	4	2	2	15	8	+7	50.00
Cyprus	7	7	0	0	27	3	+24	100.00
Czech Republic / Czechoslovakia	22	13	1	8	43	35	+8	59.09
Denmark	6	3	3	0	16	7	+9	50.00
East Germany	10	8	2	0	16	8	+8	80.00
England	55	22	15	18	67	64	+3	40.00
Finland	4	4	0	0	8	1	+7	100.00
France	38	20	10	8	58	32	+26	52.63
Germany / West Germany	54	23	14	17	82	68	+14	42.59
Greece	26	17	4	5	53	23	+30	65.38
Hungary	23	13	7	3	53	27	+26	56.52
Iceland	2	2	0	0	11	0	+11	100.00
Ireland	2	2	0	0	3	0	+3	100.00
Israel	6	4	1	1	7	4	+3	66.67
Italy	13	4	5	4	11	10	+1	30.77
Luxembourg	4	4	0	0	20	1	+19	100.00
Malta	4	4	0	0	18	0	+18	100.00
Morocco	1	1	0	0	4	1	+3	100.00
Netherlands	26	12	7	7	41	27	+14	46.15
Northern Ireland	2	2	0	0	6	0	+6	100.00
Norway	9	5	4	0	14	6	+8	55.56
Poland	10	6	3	1	27	14	+13	60.00
Portugal	26	13	5	8	37	27	+10	50.00
Romania	8	3	4	1	10	2	+8	37.50
Russia	10	9	1	0	23	5	+18	90.00
Scotland	16	11	1	4	36	14	+22	68.75
Serbia	5	4	0	1	11	4	+7	80.00
Slovakia	4	3	1	0	9	3	+6	75.00
Spain	83	32	20	31	100	95	+5	38.55
Sweden	6	5	1	0	14	3	+11	83.33
Switzerland	8	6	0	2	19	6	+13	75.00
Turkey	12	6	3	3	19	16	+3	50.00
Ukraine	10	7	2	1	22	5	+17	70.00
United Arab Emirates	1	1	0	0	5	0	+5	100.00

== See also ==
- Italian football clubs in international competitions
- List of UEFA club competition winners
- List of world champion football clubs
- UEFA club competition records and statistics
