= Jorge Pellegrini =

Argentine footballer

Personal information
- Full name: Jorge Carlos Pellegrini
- Date of birth: 12 July 1956 (age 70)
- Place of birth: Santa Fe, Argentina
- Position: Defender

Senior career*
Years	Team	Apps	(Gls)
1975	Rosario Central	1	(0)
1976	Atlético Tucumán	7	(0)
1977	Vélez Sársfield	48	(0)
1978–1979	Gimnasia de La Plata	72	(6)
1980	Colón de Santa Fe	27	(2)
1980–1981	Independiente	33	(1)
1981–1983	Loma Negra	14	(2)
1983	Instituto de Córdoba	32	(0)
1984–1987	Argentinos Juniors	50	(2)
1990	9 de Julio Buenos Aires		

International career
1985–1986	Argentina	?	(?)
- * Club domestic league appearances and goals as of 28 October 2007

Jorge Carlos Pellegrini (born 1956 in Santa Fe) is a former Argentine footballer. He played for a number of clubs in Argentina including for Argentinos Juniors in the Copa Libertadores final in 1985.

Pellegrini played for a number of clubs in Argentina before joining Argentinos Juniors, most notably Rosario Central, Vélez Sársfield, Gimnasia y Esgrimade La Plata, Colón de Santa Fe and Club Atlético Independiente.

Pellegrini joined Argentinos in 1984 and participated in the club's golden age, winning back-to-back championships in the Metropolitano 1984 and the Nacional 1985. They went on to win the Copa Libertadores 1985, also claiming the 1985 Copa Interamericana and playing in the Copa Intercontinental against Juventus of Italy.

== Titles ==
Season	Club	Title
Metropolitano 1984	Argentinos Juniors	Primera División Argentina
Nacional 1985	Argentinos Juniors	Primera División Argentina
1985	Argentinos Juniors	Copa Libertadores
1986	Argentinos Juniors	Copa Interamericana
