= Renato Corsi =

American soccer player

Personal information
- Full name: Renato Corsi
- Date of birth: January 24, 1963 (age 63)
- Place of birth: Manhattan, New York, United States
- Position: Striker

Senior career*
Years	Team	Apps	(Gls)
1983–1987	Argentinos Juniors	53	(2)
1987–1988	Instituto de Córdoba	42	(1)
1988–1989	Deportivo Armenio		
1990–1993	Atlanta		
1993–1994	Deportivo Morón		
1994–1995	Fort Lauderdale Strikers		
- * Club domestic league appearances and goals as of 28 October 2007

Renato Corsi (born January 24, 1963) is an American retired soccer player who played as a forward. He was the first American to play in the Primera División Argentina.

Corsi rose to fame as part of the Argentinos Juniors team of the early 1980s that won back-to-back championships in the Metropolitano 1984 and the Nacional 1985. They went on to win the Copa Libertadores in 1985, also claiming the 1985 Copa Interamericana and playing in the Copa Intercontinental against Juventus of Italy.

Later in his career, Corsi played for a number of other clubs in Argentina including Instituto de Córdoba, Deportivo Armenio, Club Atlético Atlanta, and Deportivo Morón.

In 1994, Corsi returned to his country of birth where he played for Fort Lauderdale Strikers.

After retiring as a footballer, Corsi went on to become a soccer agent.

== Honors ==
Argentinos Juniors

- Primera División Argentina: Metropolitano 1984, Nacional 1985
- Copa Libertadores: 1985
- Copa Interamericana: 1985
