= José Yudica =

Argentine footballer and manager (1936–2021)

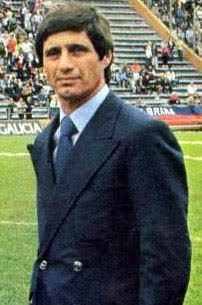
- Yudica in 1987 as manager of Newell's Old Boys

Personal information
- Full name: José Antonio Yudica
- Date of birth: February 26, 1936
- Place of birth: Rosario, Argentina
- Date of death: August 23, 2021 (aged 85)
- Position: Forward

Senior career*
Years	Team	Apps	(Gls)
1954–1958	Newell's Old Boys	112	(25)
1959–1961	Boca Juniors	65	(20)
1962–1963	Vélez Sarsfield	34	(5)
1964	Estudiantes	29	(1)
1965–1966	Platense	57	(4)
1967	Quilmes	21	(2)
1968–1969	Deportivo Cali	52	(5)
1970	Talleres (RE)		
1971–1972	San Telmo		

International career
	Argentina	4	(1)

Managerial career
- 1972–76: Altos Hornos Zapla
- 1976: Colón
- 1976–77: Newell's Old Boys
- 1977–79: Quilmes
- 1979–80: Newell's Old Boys
- 1980: Estudiantes LP
- 1981: Quilmes
- 1982: San Lorenzo
- 1984: Unión
- 1985–86: Argentinos Juniors
- 1986–87: Vélez Sársfield
- 1987–90: Newell's Old Boys
- 1991–92: Argentinos Juniors
- 1992: Platense
- 1993-94: Deportivo Cali
- 1995-96: Newell's Old Boys
- 1996-98: Pachuca
- * Club domestic league appearances and goals

José Antonio Yudica (February 26, 1936 – August 23, 2021) was an Argentine football player and manager.

Yudica had limited success as a player, winning only two titles during his brief spell at Deportivo Cali. After retirement as a player he took up management, this is where he achieved his most notable successes, leading Quilmes to their first championship after 66 years, winning three Argentine league titles with three clubs (the first manager ever to achieve this), and leading Argentinos Juniors to success in the Copa Libertadores.

== Playing career ==
Yudica had a 16-year career as a player, he started his career at Newell's Old Boys, and went on to play for Argentine giants Boca Juniors, and a number of other teams including Vélez Sársfield, Estudiantes, Platense, Quilmes, Talleres de Remedios de Escalada, San Telmo and Deportivo Cali in Colombia.

== Managerial career ==
After spells with Deportivo Español and Colón Yudica's first major achievement in management was saving struggling Quilmes from relegation in 1977.

He eclipsed this the following season by leading them to their first and only Primera division title; Metropolitano 1978.

After this he won two Second division titles with Quilmes and San Lorenzo.

Yudica made his return to the big time by leading Argentinos Juniors to victory in Nacional. The Copa Libertadores campaign of 1985 was one of the most remarkable in the history of the tournament. Argentinos found themselves in the same 1st round group as fellow Argentinian team Ferro Carril Oeste, at the end of the group the two teams were tied for first place on nine points, this required a playoff, which Argentinos won 3–1.

Argentinos won the 2nd group stage outright, to claim a place in the final against Colombian side América de Cali (fierce rivals of Yudica's former club, Deportivo Cali).

The final was a two legged affair, but both games finished 1–0 to the home team, requiring a cup final playoff but this game ended 1–1, Argentinos Juniors finally triumphed after a 5–4 victory in a penalty shootout.

Yudica led Argentinos to a further international title in 1986 winning the less prestigious Copa Interamericana against Defence Force from Trinidad and Tobago.

After his successes with Argentinos Yudica returned to Newell's Old Boys, the club at which he began his playing career over 30 years before.

He led them to the Primera division title in 1987–88, winning him the unique distinction of becoming the first manager ever to lead three different teams to the Argentine league title.

Later in his career Yudica returned to manage Deportivo Cali, and also had a spell in charge of C.F. Pachuca in Mexico.

== Honours ==
=== As player ===
Deportivo Cali

- Primera A (1): 1969

Talleres (RE)

- Primera C (1): 1970

Argentina

- Panamerican Championship (1): 1960

=== As manager ===
Quilmes

- Primera División (1): 1978 Metropolitano

San Lorenzo

- Primera B (1): 1982

Argentinos Juniors

- Primera División (1): 1985 Nacional
- Copa Libertadores (1): 1985
- Copa Interamericana (1): 1985

Newell's Old Boys

- Primera División (1): 1987–88

Pachuca

- Primera División A (1): 1995–96
