= Enrique Vidallé =

Argentine footballer

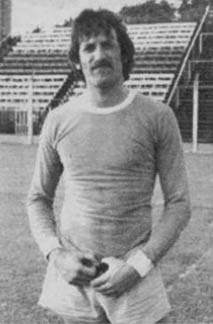
- Vidallé in 1981

Personal information
- Full name: Enrique Bernardo Vidallé
- Date of birth: 7 May 1952 (age 74)
- Place of birth: Canals, Córdoba, Argentina
- Position: Goalkeeper

Youth career
- Boca Juniors

Senior career*
Years	Team	Apps	(Gls)
1972–1975	Boca Juniors	38	(0)
1976–1977	Palestino	?	(?)
1977–1979	Gimnasia de La Plata	68	(0)
1980–1981	Estudiantes	46	(0)
1982–1983	Huracán	76	(0)
1984–1987	Argentinos Juniors	102	(0)

International career
1979	Argentina	6	(0)
- * Club domestic league appearances and goals as of 28 October 2007

Enrique Bernardo Vidallé (born 7 May 1952) is an Argentine former footballer who played as a goalkeeper. He played for a number of clubs in Argentina and Palestino in Chile.

Vidallé came through the Boca Juniors youth system to make his professional debut in 1972, he stayed at the club until his move to Chilean team Club Deportivo Palestino in 1975. Vidallé played a number of games for the Argentina national football team including appearances at the 1979 Copa América.

Vidallé played for Gimnasia y Esgrima de La Plata in the late 70s and for their fiercest rivals Estudiantes de La Plata in the early 80s. Between 1982 and 1983 he played for Club Atlético Huracán before joining Argentinos Juniors in 1984.

Vidallé was part of the Argentinos Juniors team that won back to back league championships in the Metropolitano 1984 and the Nacional 1985. They then went on to win the Copa Libertadores 1985, with Vidallé facing a penalty shootout in the final.

Argentinos went on to play in the Intercontinental Cup in 1985 which they lost to Juventus, and in the Copa Interamericana in 1986, which they won 1–0 against Defence Force. Vidallé retired in 1987 at the age of 34.

== Honours ==
Argentinos Juniors

- Primera División Argentina: Metropolitano 1984, Nacional 1985
- Copa Libertadores: 1985
- Copa Interamericana: 1985
