= Carmelo Villalba =

Argentine footballer

Personal information
- Full name: Carmelo Daniel Villalba
- Date of birth: 30 June 1962 (age 64)
- Place of birth: Buenos Aires, Argentina
- Position: Defender

Senior career*
Years	Team	Apps	(Gls)
1980–1981	El Porvenir		
1982–1988	Argentinos Juniors	222	(0)
1989–1990	Unión de Santa Fe	11	(0)
1990	Galaxia de Iguazu		
?	Chacarita Juniors		
?	Tigre		
1994–1995	Tristán Suárez		
- * Club domestic league appearances and goals as of 28 October 2007

Carmelo Daniel Villalba is a former Argentine football defender. He played in the final of the 1985 Copa Libertadores for Argentinos Juniors.

Villalba was signed by Argentinos Juniors from El Porvenir, he played for the club during its golden age, when they won 2 league titles, the Copa Libertadores 1985 and the Copa Interamericana as well as playing in the final of the Copa Intercontinental against Juventus of Italy.

After playing for Argentinos Villalba joined Unión de Santa Fe in 1989 where he played until 1990. He then played in the lower leagues of Argentine football for Galaxia de Puerto Iguazu, Chacarita Juniors, Club Atlético Tigre and CSD Tristán Suárez.

After retiring as a player Villalba became a coach, working in the youth development system at Argentinos Juniors.

== Titles ==
Season	Team	Title
Metropolitano 1984	Argentinos Juniors	Primera División Argentina
Nacional 1985	Argentinos Juniors	Primera División Argentina
1985	Argentinos Juniors	Copa Libertadores
1985	Argentinos Juniors	Copa Interamericana
