= Adrián Domenech =

Argentine footballer and coach

Personal information
- Full name: Adrián Néstor Domenech
- Date of birth: 25 March 1959 (age 67)
- Place of birth: Buenos Aires, Argentina
- Position: Defender

Senior career*
| Years | Team | Apps | (Gls) |
| 1978–1987 | Argentinos Juniors | 245 | (7) |
| 1981 | → Independiente (loan) | 9 | (1) |
| 1987–1989 | Boca Juniors | 12 | (0) |
| 1989–1990 | Genclerbirligi | ? | (?) |
| 1990 | Platense | 5 | (0) |
- * Club domestic league appearances and goals

Adrián Domenech (born 25 March 1959) is a retired Argentine football defender and former coach of Argentinos Juniors.

== Playing career ==
Adrián Domenech began his career playing for Argentinos Juniors in 1978. In 1980, he joined Club Atlético Independiente but he returned to Argentinos in 1982.

His second spell with Argentinos was a period of unprecedented success, with two league titles, the Copa Libertadores 1985 title and the Copa Interamericana title. During his time at Argentinos Domenech played 245 games in all competitions, scoring 7 goals.

After leaving Argentinos Domenech had short spells with Boca Juniors, Genclerbirligi in Turkey and with Platense, where he retired in 1991.

== Honours ==
Argentinos Juniors

- Primera División Argentina: Metropolitano 1984, Nacional 1985
- Copa Libertadores: 1985
- Copa Interamericana: 1985

Argentina Youth

- South American Games: 1986
