= Sergio Batista =

Argentine footballer and manager (born 1962)

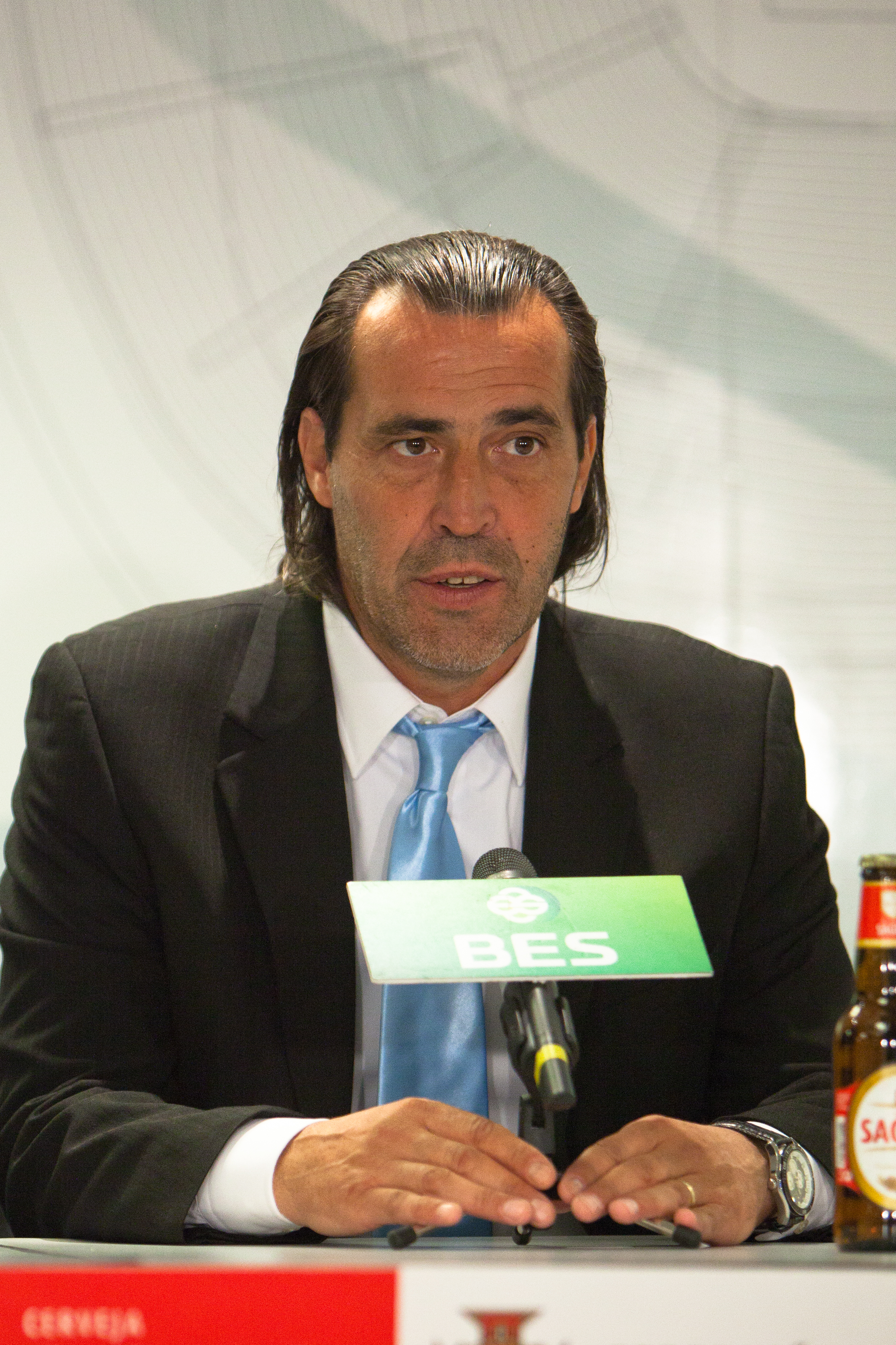
- Batista in 2011

Personal information
- Full name: Sergio Daniel Batista
- Date of birth: 9 November 1962 (age 63)
- Place of birth: Buenos Aires, Argentina
- Height: 1.86 m (6 ft 1 in)
- Position: Defensive midfielder

Team information
- Current team: Venezuela (General Manager)

Senior career*
| Years | Team | Apps | (Gls) |
| 1981–1988 | Argentinos Juniors | 253 | (25) |
| 1988–1990 | River Plate | 52 | (2) |
| 1991 | Argentinos Juniors | 19 | (0) |
| 1992–1993 | Nueva Chicago | 5 | (0) |
| 1993–1994 | PJM Futures | 95 | (5) |
| 1997–1999 | All Boys | 60 | (1) |
| Total | | 484 | (33) |

International career
| 1985–1990 | Argentina | 39 | (0) |

Managerial career
- 2000: Bella Vista
- 2001–2003: Argentinos Juniors
- 2003: Talleres
- 2004: Argentinos Juniors
- 2004–2005: Nueva Chicago
- 2007: Godoy Cruz
- 2007–2009: Argentina U-20 / Olympic
- 2010–2011: Argentina
- 2012–2014: Shanghai Shenhua
- 2015–2016: Bahrain
- 2018–2020: Qatar SC
- 2023-: Venezuela (General Manager)
Medal record
Men's football
Representing Argentina (as player)
FIFA World Cup
| Winner | 1986 Mexico |
| Runner-up | 1990 Italy |
Copa América
| Third place | 1989 Brazil |
Representing Argentina (as manager)
Olympic Games
| Gold medal – first place | 2008 Beijing | Team |
- * Club domestic league appearances and goals

Sergio Daniel "Checho" Batista (Spanish pronunciation: [ˈseɾxjo ðaˈnjel ˈtʃetʃo βaˈtista]; (Note: In isolation, Daniel and Batista are pronounced [daˈnjel] and [baˈtista] respectively.) born 9 November 1962) is an Argentine football manager and former international player for Argentina.

As a footballer he played as a midfielder for Argentinos Juniors, River Plate, Nueva Chicago, Tosu Futures and All Boys. He represented his national team 39 times from 1985 to 1990 where the team won the 1986 FIFA World Cup. After retiring he moved into coaching with Bella Vista before returning to his former club Argentinos Juniors, as well as spells at Talleres, Nueva Chicago and Godoy Cruz. He led the Argentine Olympic team to the gold medal in the 2008 Olympics, which led to him being head coach of the Argentina national football team from July 2010 to July 2011.

== Playing career ==
=== Club ===
Batista played youth football in Argentinos Juniors, and debuted with the first team in 1981. With Argentinos, he won the 1984 Metropolitano and 1985 Nacional of the Argentine Primera División, as well as the 1985 Copa Libertadores.

In 1988, Batista moved to River Plate; they won the 1989–90 league title. In 1992, he moved to Nueva Chicago. In 1993, he moved to PJM Futures in Japan. He retired as a player in 1994 and for two years from 1995 served as an assistant coach of 2 Japanese clubs. In 1997, he returned to play for All Boys in Argentina.

=== International ===
After his impressive displays for Argentinos Juniors in the 1985 Copa Libertadores, the Argentine coach Carlos Bilardo called Batista up for a friendly against Mexico on 14 November 1985 in a game that ended in a 1–1 draw. With the 1986 FIFA World Cup soon looming, Batista quickly went on to establish himself as a first choice player within the Argentina national football team. Despite his limited international experience, he played each tournament game, Argentina won. An established regular within the squad, Batista played in the 1987 Copa América, 1989 Copa América and 1990 FIFA World Cup, which Argentina came runner-up in.

== Managerial career ==
Batista started his managerial career with Uruguayan club Bella Vista in 2000. He then had two spells with Argentinos Juniors, one with Talleres de Córdoba and one with Nueva Chicago. Between 2005 and 2006, he was assistant to Oscar Ruggeri in San Lorenzo.

In October 2007, the former midfielder was appointed as the head coach of the Argentine U-20 national team, replacing Hugo Tocalli. He managed the gold medalist Argentina Olympic football team at the 2008 Summer Olympics.

After the 2010 World Cup, Argentina national team manager Diego Maradona did not renew his contract, and Batista was appointed as caretaker manager on 27 July 2010. In his role, Batista led Argentina to two wins (1–0 over Ireland and 4–1 over World Cup holders Spain) and suffered a defeat against Japan 0–1. Three months later, he was named the official head coach of the Argentina national team. In his first match after being officialized as Argentina's coach, his team defeated Brazil 1–0, with a 90th-minute goal by Lionel Messi. On 25 July 2011, the AFA announced that Batista had stepped down as manager of the Argentina national team after poor results in the Copa América.

== Honours ==
=== As a player ===
Argentinos Juniors

- Argentine Primera División: 1984 Metropolitano, 1985 Nacional
- Copa Libertadores: 1985
- Copa Interamericana: 1985

River Plate

- Argentine Primera División: 1989–90

Argentina

- FIFA World Cup: 1986; runner-up 1990

=== Individual ===
- South American Team of the Year: 1986, 1988, 1989

=== As a manager ===
Argentina

- Summer Olympics Tournament Gold Medal: 2008
