= José Luis Pavoni =

Argentine football player and manager

José Pavoni
Personal information
- Full name: José Luis Pavoni
- Date of birth: 23 May 1954 (age 72)
- Place of birth: Rosario, Argentina
- Position: Defender

Senior career*
Years	Team	Apps	(Gls)
1973–1977	Newell's Old Boys	186	(1)
1977–1981	River Plate	138	(1)
1981–1982	Pumas UNAM	10	(0)
1983–1988	Argentinos Juniors	167	(3)

International career
1975	Argentina	4	(0)
- * Club domestic league appearances and goals as of 28 October 2007

José Luis Pavoni (born 23 May 1954) is an Argentine football coach and former player. As a defender, he won honours with all four of his club teams (Newell's Old Boys, River Plate, Pumas UNAM, and Argentinos Juniors) and also represented the Argentina national football team internationally at the 1975 Copa América.

== Playing career ==
Pavoni started his professional career in 1973 at Newell's Old Boys in Rosario. In 1974, he was part of the squad that won the Metropolitano, bringing Newell's their first major championship title.

In 1975 Pavoni was part of the Argentina squad for the 1975 Copa América, which saw Argentina exit in the first round despite an 11–0 win against Venezuela.

In 1978 Pavoni joined River Plate where he won a further four league titles. In 1982, he joined Mexican side UNAM Pumas where he was part of the squad that won the 1982 CONCACAF Champions' Cup.

In 1983, he returned to Argentina to join Argentinos Juniors. During his time at the club, Argentinos enjoyed their golden age, winning back to back league championships in the Metropolitano 1984 and the Nacional 1985. They went on to win the Copa Libertadores 1985, also claiming the 1985 Copa Interamericana and playing in the Copa Intercontinental against Juventus of Italy.

== Coaching career ==
Since his retirement as a player, Pavoni has held a number of coaching positions. He was field assistant to Ramón Díaz at River Plate as they won the Copa Libertadores in 1996, he has been involved with the youth teams at Argentinos Juniors and at Newell's Old Boys.

Pavoni has also worked with the Peru Under-17 and Under-20 teams. He was in charge of the Peru under-20 team at the 2007 South American Youth Championship.

== Honours ==
=== Player ===
Newell's Old Boys

- Primera División Argentina: Metropolitano 1974

River Plate

- Primera División Argentina: Metropolitano 1979, Nacional 1979, Metropolitano 1980, Nacional 1981

UNAM Pumas

- CONCACAF Champions' Cup: 1982

Argentinos Juniors

- Primera División Argentina: Metropolitano 1984, Nacional 1985
- Copa Libertadores: 1985
- Copa Interamericana: 1985

Argentina Youth

- Toulon Tournament: 1975
