= Mario Videla =

Argentine footballer

Personal information
- Full name: Mario Hernán Videla
- Date of birth: January 28, 1962 (age 64)
- Place of birth: Mendoza, Argentina
- Position: Midfielder

Senior career*
Years	Team	Apps	(Gls)
1981–1982	Gimnasia de Mendoza	26	(9)
1982–1987	Argentinos Juniors	169	(25)
1987–1988	Millonarios		
1988–1989	Racing Club	30	(2)
1989–1990	Newell's Old Boys	29	(3)
1990	San Lorenzo	10	(2)
1991	Hamilton Steelers	14	(0)
1992–1993	FBC Melgar		
1993–1994	Deportivo Laferrere		
- * Club domestic league appearances and goals as of October 2007

Mario Hernán Videla (born 28 January 1962 in Mendoza) is a former Argentine footballer. He played for Argentinos Juniors during their golden era in the 1980s, he also won two league championships with Millonarios in Colombia.

Videla started his professional career with Gimnasia y Esgrima de Mendoza in the early 1980s. In 1982, he joined Argentinos Juniors shortly after the sale of Diego Maradona to Boca Juniors. During his time at the club, Argentinos enjoyed some remarkable successes, they won back to back league championships in the Metropolitano 1984 and the Nacional 1985. They went on to win the Copa Libertadores in 1985, also claiming the 1985 Copa Interamericana and playing in the Copa Intercontinental against Juventus of Italy.

In 1987 Videla joined Millonarios in Colombia where he won back to back league titles with the club in 1987 and 1988.

Videla returned to Argentina where he had short spells with Racing Club, Newell's Old Boys and San Lorenzo de Almagro.

In 1991, Videla played for the Hamilton Steelers in Canada. He then spent some time with FBC Melgar in Peru before returning to Argentina where he played out his career at Deportivo Laferrere in the Second division.

== Titles ==
Season	Team	Title
Metropolitano 1984	Argentinos Juniors	Primera División Argentina
Nacional 1985	Argentinos Juniors	Primera División Argentina
1985	Argentinos Juniors	Copa Libertadores
1985	Argentinos Juniors	Copa Interamericana
1987	Millonarios	Colombian league
1988	Millonarios	Colombian league
