= Jorge Olguín =

Argentine footballer and manager

Personal information
- Full name: Jorge Mario Olguín
- Date of birth: 17 May 1952 (age 74)
- Place of birth: Dolores, Argentina
- Height: 1.76 m (5 ft 9 in)
- Positions: Right-back; centre-back

Senior career*
Years	Team	Apps	(Gls)
1971–1979	San Lorenzo	247	(17)
1980–1983	Independiente	127	(13)
1984–1988	Argentinos Juniors	148	(22)
Total		522	(52)

International career
1976–1982	Argentina	60	(0)

Managerial career
- 1988: Argentinos Juniors
- 1994–1995: Avispa Fukuoka
- 1996: Argentinos Juniors
- 1997: Deportivo Saprissa
- 1998: Colón
- 1998: Almagro
- 1999–2000: Deportivo Español
- 2002–2003: Santa Bárbara
- 2003–2004: Alajuelense
- 2008: Villa Dálmine (caretaker)
- 2010: Villa Dálmine
Medal record
Representing Argentina
FIFA World Cup
Winner	1978 Argentina	Team
- * Club domestic league appearances and goals as of August 24, 2007

Jorge Mario Olguín (born 17 May 1952 in Dolores, Buenos Aires) is a retired Argentine footballer who played as a defender. He played for Argentina when the team won 1978 World Cup.

Since his retirement as a player he has managed a number of football clubs.

== Playing career ==
Mostly deployed as a centre back in club football, Olguín was positioned as a right back with the national team by coach César Luis Menotti. Among his achievements as a player there is one World Cup with the Argentina national football team, the Copa Libertadores, and six Argentine league titles.

He started his career at San Lorenzo in 1971, he played for the club for 8 years, in that time they won three trophies (1972 Metropolitano, 1972 Nacional and 1974 Nacional).

In 1978 Olguín was included in Argentina's world cup squad. Following his success at the world cup he was sold to Independiente, where he spend some time battling Pedro Monzón for a place in the first team.

Olguín was called up to join Argentina's defence of the world cup in Spain 1982, but the Albicelestes has a poor campaign, being knocked out in the 2nd group phase.

In 1983 Olguín won his only trophy with Independiente, they claimed the 1983 Metropolitano, finishing 1 point above his former team, San Lorenzo.

In 1984 Olguín was sold to Argentinos Juniors, where he won a further 2 league titles. In 1985 he helped Argentinos win their first and only Copa Libertadores title. He continued to play for Argentinos until his retirement in 1988.

== Managerial career ==
After retirement as a player Olguin has become a football manager, he has taken charge of teams in Argentina, Japan and Costa Rica.

- Argentinos Juniors
- Colón
- Almagro
- Deportivo Español
- Avispa Fukuoka
- Deportivo Saprissa
- Club Santa Bárbara
- Liga Deportiva Alajuelense
- Villa Dálmine

== Player statistics ==
- Argentina (1976–1982): Games 60 Goals 0.
- Argentine Primera (1971–1988): Games 529 Goals 53.

== Honours ==
=== Club ===
San Lorenzo

- Metropolitano: 1972
- Nacional: 1972, 1974

Independiente

- Metropolitano: 1983

Argentinos Juniors

- Metropolitano: 1984
- Nacional: 1985
- Copa Libertadores: 1985
- Copa Interamericana: 1986

=== International ===
Argentina

- FIFA World Cup: 1978

=== Individual ===
- IFFHS Argentina All Times Dream Team (Team C): 2021
