= Emilio Commisso =

Argentine footballer and manager

Personal information
- Full name: Emilio Nicolás Commisso
- Date of birth: November 5, 1956 (age 69)
- Place of birth: Córdoba, Argentina
- Position: Midfielder

Senior career*
Years	Team	Apps	(Gls)
1976–1983	River Plate	218	(27)
1984–1988	Argentinos Juniors	136	(14)
1988–1989	Talleres de Córdoba	36	(5)
1989–1990	Xerez	16	(1)
1990–1991	Estudiantes	18	(0)
1991–1992	Quilmes	17	(0)

Managerial career
- 2003: Racing Club
- 2005: Talleres de Córdoba
- * Club domestic league appearances and goals as of 28 October 2007

Emilio Nicolás Commisso (born 5 November 1956 in Córdoba) is a former Argentine footballer. He played as a midfielder for a number of clubs in Argentina and Spain.

Commisso started his professional career in 1976 with River Plate. During his seven years playing at the club, they won five league titles. Commisso played 218 league games for River, scoring 27 goals.

In 1984, he joined Argentinos Juniors, he played for the club during their golden age, winning two league titles the Copa Libertadores 1985 and the Copa Interamericana, they also played in the Copa Intercontinental against Juventus of Italy.

Commisso left Argentinos in 1988 to join Talleres de Córdoba but he only stayed one season before joining Xerez in Spain.

Commisso returned to Argentina to play for Estudiantes de La Plata and his last club was Quilmes Atlético Club between 1991 and 1992.

== Honours ==
=== Player ===
River Plate

- Metropolitano: 1977, 1979, 1980
- Nacional: 1979, 1981

Argentinos Juniors

- Metropolitano: 1984
- Nacional: 1985
- Copa Libertadores: 1985
- Copa Interamericana: 1985

== Coaching career ==
Trayectoria DT Profesional

- Director Técnico Alterno – Instituto Atlético Central Córdoba – (1998–1999)
- Director Técnico Alterno – Club Atlético Talleres – Primera División (1999–2000)
- Director Técnico Alterno – Unión de Santa Fe – Primera División (2000–2001)
- Director Técnico Alterno – Rosario Central – Primera División (2001–2002)
- Manager General – Club Racing de Avellaneda (2002 –2005)
- Director Técnico – Club Racing de Avellaneda
- Director Técnico – Club Atlético Talleres – Nacional "B" (2005)
- Director técnico alterno Club Beitar Jerusalem, Israel (2006)
- Director técnico alterno Club Atlético Huracán (2007)
- Director técnico alterno Club Cerro Porteño, Asunción, Paraguay 2008)

Commisso has held a number of positions at Racing Club including club secretary, co-ordinator of football and interim manager in 2003. In 2005, he was approached to take over as manager of Talleres de Córdoba.
