= 1985 Copa Libertadores =

26th season of Copa Libertadores

1985 Copa Libertadores de América
Tournament details
- Dates: March 3 – October 24
- Teams: 21 (from 10 associations)

Final positions
- Champions: (Argentina) Argentinos Juniors (1st title)
- Runners-up: (Colombia) América de Cali

Tournament statistics
- Matches played: 74
- Goals scored: 183 (2.47 per match)

The 1985 edition of Copa Libertadores was the 26th edition of the Copa Libertadores. It was won by Argentinos Juniors, of Argentina for the first time, after defeating América of Colombia in a penalty shootout, following a playoff game after the two-legged final finished level.

== Qualified teams ==
Country	Team	Qualification method
CONMEBOL (1 berth)	Independiente	1984 Copa Libertadores champion
Argentina (2 berths)	Ferro Carril Oeste	1984 Nacional champion
Argentina (2 berths)	Argentinos Juniors	1984 Metropolitano champion
Bolivia (2 berths)	Blooming	1984 Primera División champion
Bolivia (2 berths)	Oriente Petrolero	1984 Primera División runner-up
Brazil (2 berths)	Fluminense	1984 Campeonato Brasileiro Série A champion
Brazil (2 berths)	Vasco da Gama	1984 Campeonato Brasileiro Série A runner-up
Chile (2 berths)	Colo-Colo	1983 Primera División champion
Chile (2 berths)	Magallanes	1983 Liguilla Pre-Copa Libertadores winner
Colombia (2 berths)	América de Cali	1984 Campeonato Profesional champion
Colombia (2 berths)	Millonarios	1984 Campeonato Profesional runner-up
Ecuador (2 berths)	El Nacional	1984 Campeonato Ecuatoriano champion
Ecuador (2 berths)	9 de Octubre	1984 Campeonato Ecuatoriano runner-up
Paraguay (2 berths)	Guaraní	1984 Primera División champion
Paraguay (2 berths)	Cerro Porteño	1984 Primera División runner-up
Peru (2 berths)	Sport Boys	1984 Primera División champion
Peru (2 berths)	Universitario	1984 Primera División runner-up
Uruguay (2 berths)	Peñarol	1984 Liguilla Pre-Libertadores winner
Uruguay (2 berths)	Bella Vista	1984 Liguilla Pre-Libertadores runner-up
Venezuela (2 berths)	Deportivo Táchira	1984 Primera División champion
Venezuela (2 berths)	Deportivo Italia	1984 Primera División runner-up

== Draw ==
The champions and runners-up of each football association were drawn into the same group along with another football association's participating teams. Three clubs from Argentina competed as Independiente was champion of the 1984 Copa Libertadores. They entered the tournament in the Semifinals.

Group 1	Group 2	Group 3	Group 4	Group 5
Argentina; Brazil	Bolivia; Venezuela	Colombia; Paraguay	Chile; Uruguay	Ecuador; Peru

== Group stage ==
=== Group A ===
Pos	Team	Pld	W	D	L	GF	GA	GD	Pts	Qualification	(Argentina) ARG	(Argentina) FER	(Brazil) FLU	(Brazil) VAS
1	(Argentina) Argentinos Juniors	6	4	1	1	9	5	+4	9	Semifinals	—	0–1	1–0	2–2
2	(Argentina) Ferro Carril Oeste	6	4	1	1	7	3	+4	9		1–3	—	1–0	2–0
3	(Brazil) Fluminense	6	0	3	3	3	6	−3	3		0–1	0–0	—	3–3
4	(Brazil) Vasco da Gama	6	0	3	3	6	11	−5	3		1–2	0–2	0–0	—

==== Tiebreaker ====
Team 1	Score	Team 2
Argentinos Juniors (Argentina)	3–1	(Argentina) Ferro Carril Oeste

=== Group B ===
Pos	Team	Pld	W	D	L	GF	GA	GD	Pts	Qualification	(Bolivia) BLO	(Bolivia) OPE	(Venezuela) TAC	(Venezuela) ITA
1	(Bolivia) Blooming	6	5	1	0	20	4	+16	11	Semifinals	—	1–1	6–3	8–0
2	(Bolivia) Oriente Petrolero	6	3	2	1	11	6	+5	8		0–1	—	3–2	3–1
3	(Venezuela) Deportivo Táchira	6	1	2	3	9	12	−3	4		0–1	1–1	—	0–0
4	(Venezuela) Deportivo Italia	6	0	1	5	2	20	−18	1		0–3	0–3	1–3	—

=== Group C ===
Pos	Team	Pld	W	D	L	GF	GA	GD	Pts	Qualification	(Colombia) AME	(Paraguay) CPO	(Colombia) MIL	(Paraguay) GUA
1	(Colombia) América de Cali	6	2	4	0	5	2	+3	8	Semifinals	—	2–0	0–0	2–1
2	(Paraguay) Cerro Porteño	6	2	3	1	5	3	+2	7		0–0	—	0–0	3–1
3	(Colombia) Millonarios	6	1	3	2	5	5	0	5		0–0	0–2	—	5–1
4	(Paraguay) Guaraní	6	1	2	3	6	11	−5	4		1–1	0–0	2–0	—

=== Group D ===
Pos	Team	Pld	W	D	L	GF	GA	GD	Pts	Qualification	(Uruguay) PEÑ	(Chile) COL	(Chile) MAG	(Uruguay) BVI
1	(Uruguay) Peñarol	6	5	1	0	10	3	+7	11	Semifinals	—	3–1	1–0	1–0
2	(Chile) Colo-Colo	6	3	0	3	10	8	+2	6		1–2	—	2–0	2–0
3	(Chile) Magallanes	6	2	1	3	5	8	−3	5		1–1	1–3	—	2–1
4	(Uruguay) Bella Vista	6	1	0	5	3	9	−6	2		0–2	2–1	0–1	—

=== Group E ===
Pos	Team	Pld	W	D	L	GF	GA	GD	Pts	Qualification	(Ecuador) NAC	(Peru) UNI	(Ecuador) 9OC	(Peru) SBA
1	(Ecuador) El Nacional	6	5	1	0	13	4	+9	11	Semifinals	—	4–1	3–1	2–0
2	(Peru) Universitario	5	2	1	2	8	6	+2	5		1–1	—	—	4–0
3	(Ecuador) 9 de Octubre	4	2	0	2	6	4	+2	4		0–1	1–0	—	4–0
4	(Peru) Sport Boys	5	0	0	5	1	14	−13	0		1–2	0–2	—	—

== Semi-finals ==
=== Group 1 ===
Pos	Team	Pld	W	D	L	GF	GA	GD	Pts	Qualification	(Argentina) ARG	(Argentina) IND	(Bolivia) BLO
1	(Argentina) Argentinos Juniors	4	2	2	0	6	4	+2	6	Finals	—	2–2	1–0
2	(Argentina) Independiente	4	1	2	1	6	5	+1	4		1–2	—	2–0
3	(Bolivia) Blooming	4	0	2	2	2	5	−3	2		1–1	1–1	—

=== Group 2 ===
Pos	Team	Pld	W	D	L	GF	GA	GD	Pts	Qualification	(Colombia) AME	(Ecuador) NAC	(Uruguay) PEÑ
1	(Colombia) América de Cali	4	2	1	1	10	3	+7	5	Finals	—	5–0	4–0
2	(Ecuador) El Nacional	4	2	0	2	4	7	−3	4		2–0	—	2–0
3	(Uruguay) Peñarol	4	1	1	2	3	7	−4	3		1–1	2–0	—

== Finals ==
Team 1	Agg.	Team 2	1st leg	2nd leg
Argentinos Juniors (Argentina)	1–1	(Colombia) América de Cali	1–0	0-1

=== Playoff ===
24 October 1985	(Colombia) América de Cali	1–1 (a.e.t.) (4–5 p)	Argentinos Juniors (Argentina)	Defensores del Chaco, Asunción
	Gareca 42'	Report	Commisso 37'
	Penalties
	Gareca (penalty scored); Soto (penalty scored); Herrera (penalty scored); Cabañas (penalty scored); de Ávila (penalty missed)		(penalty scored) Olguín; (penalty scored) Batista; (penalty scored) Pavoni; (penalty scored) Borghi; (penalty scored) Videla

== Champion ==
Copa Libertadores
1985 Winner

Argentinos Juniors
First Title
