= 1991 FIFA World Youth Championship squads =

FIFA championship roster

== Group A ==
=== Argentina ===
Head coach: (Argentina) Reinaldo Merlo

| No. | Pos. | Player | Date of birth (age) | Caps | Club |
|---|---|---|---|---|---|
| 1 | GK | Fernando Regulés | 15 October 1973 (aged 17) | | (Argentina) San Lorenzo |
| 2 | DF | Mauricio Pochettino | 2 March 1972 (aged 19) | | (Argentina) Newell's Old Boys |
| 3 | DF | Diego Cocca | 11 February 1972 (aged 19) | | (Argentina) River Plate |
| 4 | DF | Juan José di Stéfano | 4 December 1971 (aged 19) | | (Argentina) Racing Club |
| 5 | DF | Gabriel Bellino | 22 September 1971 (aged 19) | | (Argentina) Ferro Carril Oeste |
| 6 | DF | Mauricio Pellegrino | 5 October 1971 (aged 19) | | (Argentina) Vélez Sársfield |
| 7 | FW | Marcelo Delgado | 24 March 1973 (aged 18) | | (Argentina) Rosario Central |
| 8 | MF | Claudio Marini | 15 May 1972 (aged 19) | | (Argentina) Racing Club |
| 9 | FW | Juan Esnáider | 5 March 1973 (aged 18) | | (Argentina) Ferro Carril Oeste |
| 10 | MF | Walter Paz | 4 March 1973 (aged 18) | | (Argentina) Argentinos Juniors |
| 11 | FW | Roberto Molina | 28 October 1971 (aged 19) | | (Argentina) Ferro Carril Oeste |
| 12 | GK | Leonardo Díaz | 5 September 1972 (aged 18) | | (Argentina) Newell's Old Boys |
| 13 | DF | José María Bazán | 14 October 1971 (aged 19) | | (Argentina) Platense |
| 14 | DF | César Loza | 30 October 1971 (aged 19) | | (Argentina) Estudiantes |
| 15 | FW | Roberto Mogrovejo | 19 June 1972 (aged 18) | | (Argentina) Argentinos Juniors |
| 16 | MF | Claudio Paris | 31 March 1973 (aged 18) | | (Argentina) Estudiantes |
| 17 | MF | Hugo Morales | 30 July 1974 (aged 16) | | (Argentina) Huracán |
| 18 | MF | Christian Bassedas | 16 February 1973 (aged 18) | | (Argentina) Vélez Sársfield |

=== Korea ===
Head coach: (North Korea) An Se-uk

| No. | Pos. | Player | Date of birth (age) | Caps | Club |
|---|---|---|---|---|---|
| 1 | GK | Kim Jong-son | 27 August 1972 (aged 18) | | (North Korea) Pyongyang Athletics College |
| 2 | DF | Chong Gang-song | 15 October 1973 (aged 17) | | (North Korea) Pyongyang Athletics Institute |
| 3 | DF | Kang Chul | 2 November 1971 (aged 19) | | (South Korea) Yonsei University |
| 4 | DF | Park Chul | 20 August 1973 (aged 17) | | (South Korea) Daegu University |
| 5 | MF | Noh Tai-kyung | 22 April 1972 (aged 19) | | (South Korea) POSCO Atoms |
| 6 | DF | Jang Hyun-ho | 14 October 1972 (aged 18) | | (South Korea) Korea University |
| 7 | MF | Kim Jong-man | 16 December 1972 (aged 18) | | (North Korea) Pyongyang Athletics College |
| 8 | MF | Cho Jin-ho | 2 August 1973 (aged 17) | | (South Korea) Kyung Hee University |
| 9 | FW | Seo Dong-won | 12 December 1973 (aged 17) | | (South Korea) Jungdong High School |
| 10 | FW | Yun Chol | 27 October 1972 (aged 18) | | (North Korea) Pyongyang College of Education |
| 11 | DF | Cho In-chol | 2 October 1973 (aged 17) | | (North Korea) Pyongyang Athletics College |
| 12 | FW | Han Yeon-chul | 30 March 1972 (aged 19) | | (South Korea) Korea University |
| 13 | FW | Choi Yong-son | 10 October 1972 (aged 18) | | (North Korea) Pyongyang Athletics College |
| 14 | MF | Li Chang-ha | 23 August 1972 (aged 18) | | (North Korea) Pyongyang College of Education |
| 15 | FW | Choi Chol | 18 December 1973 (aged 17) | | (North Korea) Pyongyang Athletics College |
| 16 | MF | Lee Tae-hong | 1 October 1971 (aged 19) | | (South Korea) Daegu University |
| 17 | DF | Lee Lim-saeng | 18 November 1971 (aged 19) | | (South Korea) Korea University |
| 18 | GK | Choi Ik-hyung | 5 August 1973 (aged 17) | | (South Korea) Korea University |

=== Portugal ===
Head coach: (Portugal) Carlos Queiroz

| No. | Pos. | Player | Date of birth (age) | Caps | Goals | Club |
|---|---|---|---|---|---|---|
| 1 | GK | Fernando Brassard | 11 April 1972 (aged 19) | 4 | 0 | (Portuguese Football Federation) Louletano |
| 2 | FW | Gil Gomes | 2 December 1972 (aged 18) | 6 | 2 | (Portuguese Football Federation) Benfica |
| 3 | MF | Luís Figo | 4 November 1972 (aged 18) | 6 | 0 | (Portuguese Football Federation) Sporting CP |
| 4 | MF | Emílio Peixe | 16 January 1973 (aged 18) | 5 | 0 | (Portuguese Football Federation) Sporting CP |
| 5 | MF | Rui Costa | 29 March 1972 (aged 19) | 6 | 0 | (Portuguese Football Federation) Fafe |
| 6 | DF | Jorge Costa | 14 October 1971 (aged 19) | 4 | 1 | (Portuguese Football Federation) Penafiel |
| 7 | DF | Abel Xavier | 30 November 1972 (aged 18) | 5 | 0 | (Portuguese Football Federation) Estrela da Amadora |
| 8 | DF | Paulo Torres | 25 November 1971 (aged 19) | 6 | 3 | (Portuguese Football Federation) Sporting CP |
| 9 | DF | Luís Miguel | 24 July 1972 (aged 18) | 3 | 0 | (Portuguese Football Federation) Rio Ave |
| 10 | DF | Fernando Nélson | 5 November 1971 (aged 19) | 1 | 0 | (Portuguese Football Federation) Sporting CP |
| 11 | MF | Rui Bento | 14 January 1972 (aged 19) | 6 | 0 | (Portuguese Football Federation) Benfica |
| 12 | GK | Tó Ferreira | 24 August 1971 (aged 19) | 3 | 0 | (Portuguese Football Federation) Famalicão |
| 13 | FW | Capucho | 21 February 1972 (aged 19) | 3 | 0 | (Portuguese Football Federation) Gil Vicente |
| 14 | FW | João Vieira Pinto | 18 August 1971 (aged 19) | 12 | 2 | Unattached |
| 15 | MF | Tulipa | 6 December 1971 (aged 19) | 3 | 0 | (Portuguese Football Federation) Porto |
| 16 | MF | Cao | 20 October 1968 (aged 22) ^{1} | 5 | 0 | (Portuguese Football Federation) Porto |
| 17 | MF | João Oliveira Pinto | 3 August 1971 (aged 19) | 6 | 1 | (Portuguese Football Federation) Atlético CP |
| 18 | FW | Toni | 2 August 1972 (aged 18) | 5 | 0 | (Portuguese Football Federation) Porto |

^{1}In 2002, it was revealed that Cao had in fact been born in 1968.

=== Republic of Ireland ===
Head coach: (England) Maurice Setters

| No. | Pos. | Player | Date of birth (age) | Caps | Club |
|---|---|---|---|---|---|
| 1 | GK | John Connolly | 28 December 1971 (aged 19) | | (Republic of Ireland) Bohemians |
| 2 | DF | David Collins | 30 October 1971 (aged 19) | | (England) Liverpool |
| 3 | DF | Ken Gillard | 30 April 1972 (aged 19) | | (England) Luton Town |
| 4 | DF | Paul McCarthy | 4 August 1971 (aged 19) | | (England) Brighton & Hove Albion |
| 5 | DF | John Carroll | 13 October 1971 (aged 19) | | (England) Liverpool |
| 6 | MF | Kieran Toal | 14 December 1971 (aged 19) | | (England) Manchester United |
| 7 | MF | Kieron Brady | 17 September 1971 (aged 19) | | (England) Sunderland |
| 8 | FW | Derek McGrath | 21 January 1972 (aged 19) | | (England) Brighton & Hove Albion |
| 9 | FW | Lee Power | 30 June 1972 (aged 18) | | (England) Norwich City |
| 10 | DF | Barry O'Connor | 17 June 1972 (aged 18) | | (Republic of Ireland) Shamrock Rovers |
| 11 | FW | Brian Byrne | 23 March 1972 (aged 19) | | (England) Huddersfield Town |
| 12 | GK | Keith Brady | 10 October 1971 (aged 19) | | (Republic of Ireland) Bohemians |
| 13 | DF | Leonard Curtis | 2 January 1973 (aged 18) | | (England) Leeds United |
| 14 | DF | John Bacon | 23 March 1973 (aged 18) | | (England) Arsenal |
| 15 | DF | Tommy Dunne | 27 April 1972 (aged 19) | | (Republic of Ireland) Dundalk |
| 16 | GK | George O'Hanlon | 9 December 1972 (aged 18) | | (England) Leyton Orient |
| 17 | FW | Jason Byrne | 16 May 1972 (aged 19) | | (England) Huddersfield Town |
| 18 | MF | Liam Dunne | 1 September 1971 (aged 19) | | (Republic of Ireland) Bohemians |

== Group B ==
=== Brazil ===
Head coach: (Brazil) Ernesto Paulo

| No. | Pos. | Player | Date of birth (age) | Caps | Club |
|---|---|---|---|---|---|
| 1 | GK | Roger | 23 July 1972 (aged 18) | | (Brazil) Flamengo |
| 2 | DF | Zelão | 20 January 1972 (aged 19) | | (Brazil) Cruzeiro |
| 3 | DF | Castro | 26 September 1971 (aged 19) | | (Brazil) CA Juventus |
| 4 | DF | Andrei | 21 February 1973 (aged 18) | | (Brazil) Palmeiras |
| 5 | MF | Marquinhos | 2 October 1971 (aged 19) | | (Brazil) Flamengo |
| 6 | DF | Roberto Carlos | 10 April 1973 (aged 18) | | (Brazil) União São João |
| 7 | FW | Paulo Nunes | 30 October 1971 (aged 19) | | (Brazil) Flamengo |
| 8 | MF | Djair | 21 September 1971 (aged 19) | | (Brazil) Botafogo |
| 9 | FW | Giovane Élber | 23 July 1972 (aged 18) | | (Italy) Milan |
| 10 | MF | Luiz Fernando | 15 November 1971 (aged 19) | | (Brazil) Internacional |
| 11 | MF | Sérgio Manoel | 2 March 1972 (aged 19) | | (Brazil) Santos |
| 12 | GK | Emerson Ferretti | 23 September 1971 (aged 19) | | (Brazil) Grêmio |
| 13 | DF | Ânderson | 18 March 1973 (aged 18) | | (Brazil) CA Juventus |
| 14 | FW | Serginho | 27 May 1973 (aged 18) | | (Brazil) Palmeiras |
| 15 | MF | Rodrigão | 20 May 1972 (aged 19) | | (Brazil) Flamengo |
| 16 | FW | Sandro | 10 December 1971 (aged 19) | | (Brazil) Botafogo |
| 17 | DF | Ramon | 30 June 1972 (aged 18) | | (Brazil) Cruzeiro |
| 18 | FW | Sérgio Eduardo | 15 October 1972 (aged 18) | | (Brazil) Vitória |

=== Ivory Coast ===
Head coach: (Ivory Coast) Martin Gbonke Tia

| No. | Pos. | Player | Date of birth (age) | Caps | Club |
|---|---|---|---|---|---|
| 1 | GK | Losseni Konaté | 29 December 1972 (aged 18) | | (Ivory Coast) ASEC Abidjan |
| 2 | DF | Guy Hoba | 29 December 1973 (aged 17) | | (Ivory Coast) Gagnoa |
| 3 | DF | Patrice Yode | 27 November 1971 (aged 19) | | (Ivory Coast) Gagnoa |
| 4 | MF | Troa Kpahou | 17 April 1972 (aged 19) | | (Ivory Coast) AUC |
| 5 | DF | Jean-Marie Gbahou | 1 April 1973 (aged 18) | | (Ivory Coast) Stella |
| 6 | DF | Nguessan Nzoue | 12 December 1973 (aged 17) | | (Ivory Coast) Stella |
| 7 | FW | Sylvain Tiehi | 31 December 1972 (aged 18) | | (France) Le Havre |
| 8 | DF | Gnazale Bohui | 24 March 1973 (aged 18) | | (Ivory Coast) Stade Abidjan |
| 9 | FW | Michel Bassole | 18 July 1972 (aged 18) | | (Ivory Coast) ASEC Abidjan |
| 10 | MF | Ambroise Mambo | 1 January 1974 (aged 17) | | (France) Martigues |
| 11 | MF | Jean Gbelle | 26 July 1972 (aged 18) | | (France) Brest |
| 12 | DF | Guy Koffi | 30 January 1975 (aged 16) | | (Ivory Coast) Stella |
| 13 | MF | Melaine Babou | 7 January 1973 (aged 18) | | (Ivory Coast) Stade Abidjan |
| 14 | DF | Guy Zozo | 30 December 1971 (aged 19) | | (Ivory Coast) Stade Abidjan |
| 15 | MF | Ambroise Seri | 7 December 1972 (aged 18) | | (Ivory Coast) Stella |
| 16 | MF | Moussa Konaté | 11 April 1972 (aged 19) | | (Ivory Coast) Stella |
| 17 | MF | Adama Yoro Bi | 25 May 1974 (aged 17) | | (Ivory Coast) Africa Sports |
| 18 | GK | Patrice Tade | 16 December 1974 (aged 16) | | (Ivory Coast) Stella |

=== Mexico ===
Head coach: (Mexico) Alfonso Portugal

| No. | Pos. | Player | Date of birth (age) | Caps | Club |
|---|---|---|---|---|---|
| 1 | GK | Miguel Fuentes | 29 September 1971 (aged 19) | | (Mexico) Atlas |
| 2 | DF | Héctor Enríquez | 23 January 1972 (aged 19) | | (Mexico) Tecos UAG |
| 3 | DF | Luis Felipe Peña | 3 May 1972 (aged 19) | | (Mexico) Universidad de Guadalajara |
| 4 | DF | Mario Trejo | 2 August 1971 (aged 19) | | (Mexico) Cruz Azul |
| 5 | DF | Javier Delgado | 21 September 1971 (aged 19) | | (Mexico) Abasolo |
| 6 | MF | Miguel García | 11 August 1971 (aged 19) | | (Mexico) Guadalajara |
| 7 | MF | Mauricio Gallaga | 16 July 1972 (aged 18) | | (Mexico) Cocula Ind |
| 8 | MF | Gustavo Gaytán | 27 February 1972 (aged 19) | | (Mexico) Veracruz |
| 9 | FW | Pedro Pineda | 30 November 1971 (aged 19) | | (Mexico) Cachorros Neza |
| 10 | FW | Damián Álvarez | 11 March 1973 (aged 18) | | (Mexico) Atlas |
| 11 | FW | Manuel Martínez | 3 January 1972 (aged 19) | | (Mexico) Guadalajara |
| 12 | GK | Javier Quintero | 15 September 1972 (aged 18) | | (Mexico) Universidad de Guadalajara |
| 13 | MF | Bruno Mendoza | 6 October 1971 (aged 19) | | (Mexico) Puebla |
| 14 | DF | Bulmaro González | 12 November 1971 (aged 19) | | (Mexico) UNAM |
| 15 | FW | Juan Parra | 25 March 1972 (aged 19) | | (Mexico) Tecos UAG |
| 16 | MF | Fernando Guijarro | 1 January 1972 (aged 19) | | (Mexico) Ciudad Guzmán |
| 17 | MF | Héctor Hernández | 6 March 1973 (aged 18) | | (Mexico) Cruz Azul |
| 18 | MF | Humberto Domínguez | 29 September 1971 (aged 19) | | (Mexico) UNAM |

=== Sweden ===
Head coach: (Sweden) Ulf Lyfors

| No. | Pos. | Player | Date of birth (age) | Caps | Club |
|---|---|---|---|---|---|
| 1 | GK | Magnus Hedman | 19 March 1973 (aged 18) | | (Sweden) AIK |
| 2 | DF | Filip Apelstav | 18 September 1971 (aged 19) | | (Sweden) Västra Frölunda |
| 3 | DF | Magnus Johansson | 10 November 1971 (aged 19) | | (Sweden) IFK Göteborg |
| 4 | DF | Henrik Nilsson | 25 July 1972 (aged 18) | | (Sweden) Malmö FF |
| 5 | DF | Rasmus Svensson | 5 September 1971 (aged 19) | | (Sweden) Malmö FF |
| 6 | DF | Glenn Ståhl | 25 August 1971 (aged 19) | | (Sweden) IFK Värnamo |
| 7 | MF | Niclas Alexandersson | 29 December 1971 (aged 19) | | (Sweden) Halmstads BK |
| 8 | DF | Patrik Andersson | 18 August 1971 (aged 19) | | (Sweden) Malmö FF |
| 9 | MF | Mikael Hellström | 11 March 1972 (aged 19) | | (Sweden) Hammarby IF |
| 10 | MF | Jonny Hägerå | 10 September 1971 (aged 19) | | (Sweden) Örgryte IS |
| 11 | MF | Patrick Luxenburg | 7 July 1972 (aged 18) | | (Sweden) Djurgårdens IF |
| 12 | GK | Mats Svensson | 22 November 1971 (aged 19) | | (Sweden) Landskrona |
| 13 | MF | Ulf Lilius | 27 January 1972 (aged 19) | | (Sweden) Helsingborgs IF |
| 14 | MF | Jonny Rödlund | 22 December 1971 (aged 19) | | (Sweden) IFK Norrköping |
| 15 | FW | Andreas Bild | 3 October 1971 (aged 19) | | (Sweden) Östers IF |
| 16 | FW | Niklas Gudmundsson | 29 February 1972 (aged 19) | | (Sweden) Halmstads BK |
| 17 | FW | Roger Nordstrand | 20 May 1973 (aged 18) | | (Sweden) Örgryte IS |
| 18 | FW | Stefan Paldan | 27 October 1971 (aged 19) | | (Sweden) Östers IF |

== Group C ==
=== Australia ===
Head coach: (Australia) Les Scheinflug

| No. | Pos. | Player | Date of birth (age) | Caps | Club |
|---|---|---|---|---|---|
| 1 | GK | Mark Bosnich | 13 January 1972 (aged 19) | | (England) Manchester United |
| 2 | MF | Robert Spasevski | 7 November 1972 (aged 18) | | (Australia) Preston Makedonia |
| 3 | DF | Robert Stojcevski | 1 January 1973 (aged 18) | | (Australia) Preston Makedonia |
| 4 | DF | Mark Babic | 24 April 1973 (aged 18) | | (Australia) Sydney Croatia |
| 5 | DF | Paul Okon | 5 April 1972 (aged 19) | | (Australia) Marconi Stallions |
| 6 | MF | Adem Poric | 22 April 1973 (aged 18) | | (Australia) St. George Saints |
| 7 | MF | Matthew Bingley | 16 August 1971 (aged 19) | | (Australia) St George |
| 8 | MF | Lorenz Kindtner | 13 October 1971 (aged 19) | | (Australia) Sunshine George Cross |
| 9 | FW | David Seal | 26 January 1972 (aged 19) | | (Australia) Marconi Stallions |
| 10 | FW | Kris Trajanovski | 19 February 1972 (aged 19) | | (Australia) Preston Makedonia |
| 11 | MF | Steve Corica | 24 March 1973 (aged 18) | | (Australia) Marconi Stallions |
| 12 | DF | Kevin Muscat | 7 August 1973 (aged 17) | | (Australia) Heidelberg United |
| 13 | DF | Tony Popovic | 4 July 1973 (aged 17) | | (Australia) Sydney Croatia |
| 14 | MF | Brad Maloney | 19 January 1972 (aged 19) | | (Australia) Canberra Metros |
| 15 | DF | Robert Stanton | 15 April 1972 (aged 19) | | (Australia) Sydney Croatia |
| 16 | FW | Mark Silic | 26 February 1972 (aged 19) | | (Australia) Melbourne Croatia |
| 17 | FW | George Sorras | 11 April 1972 (aged 19) | | (Australia) Sydney Olympic |
| 18 | GK | Zeljko Kalac | 16 December 1972 (aged 18) | | (Australia) Sydney Croatia |

=== Egypt ===
Head coach: (Egypt) Mohamed El Ezz

| No. | Pos. | Player | Date of birth (age) | Caps | Club |
|---|---|---|---|---|---|
| 1 | GK | Nader El-Sayed | 31 December 1971 (aged 19) | | (Egypt) Zamalek |
| 2 | DF | Tamer Abdul Hamid | 16 October 1971 (aged 19) | | (Egypt) Zamalek |
| 3 | DF | Yehya Nabil | 4 September 1971 (aged 19) | | (Egypt) Zamalek |
| 4 | DF | Ahmed Ayoub | 5 August 1971 (aged 19) | | (Egypt) Al Ahly |
| 5 | MF | Samir Kamouna | 2 April 1972 (aged 19) | | (Egypt) Al-Mokawloon al-Arab |
| 6 | DF | Sami El-Sheshini | 23 January 1972 (aged 19) | | (Egypt) Zamalek |
| 7 | MF | Hady Khashaba | 19 December 1972 (aged 18) | | (Egypt) Al Ahly |
| 8 | MF | Akl Gadalla | 15 November 1972 (aged 18) | | (Egypt) Zamalek |
| 9 | MF | Momen Abdel Gafar | 20 October 1971 (aged 19) | | (Egypt) Tersana |
| 10 | MF | Walid Salah El-Din | 27 October 1971 (aged 19) | | (Egypt) Al Ahly |
| 11 | FW | Moustafa Sadek | 31 January 1972 (aged 19) | | (Egypt) Al-Mokawloon al-Arab |
| 12 | GK | Tarik Soliman | 25 June 1973 (aged 17) | | (Egypt) Al Ahly |
| 13 | FW | Ibrahim El-Masry | 19 August 1971 (aged 19) | | (Egypt) El-Masry |
| 14 | MF | Ayman Mohamed | 2 October 1973 (aged 17) | | (Egypt) Ismaily |
| 15 | FW | Sami Abdel Halil | 23 March 1972 (aged 19) | | (Egypt) Zamalek |
| 16 | GK | Mostafa Kamal | 23 October 1973 (aged 17) | | (Egypt) Al Ahly |
| 17 | FW | Tamer Sakr | 27 March 1972 (aged 19) | | (Egypt) Al Ahly |
| 18 | MF | Amir Abdel Aziz | 16 February 1972 (aged 19) | | (Egypt) Zamalek |

=== Soviet Union ===
Head coach: (Soviet Union) Gennadi Kostylev

| No. | Pos. | Player | Date of birth (age) | Caps | Club |
|---|---|---|---|---|---|
| 1 | GK | Oleksandr Pomazun | 11 October 1971 (aged 19) | | (Soviet Union) Metallist Kharkov |
| 2 | DF | Yervand Krbachyan | 1 October 1971 (aged 19) | | (Soviet Union) Ararat Yerevan |
| 3 | DF | Sergei Mandreko | 1 August 1971 (aged 19) | | (Soviet Union) Pamir Dushanbe |
| 4 | DF | Sergei Mamchur | 3 February 1972 (aged 19) | | (Soviet Union) Dnipro Dnipropetrovsk |
| 5 | DF | Valeri Minko | 8 August 1971 (aged 19) | | (Soviet Union) CSKA Moscow |
| 6 | DF | Yevgeni Bushmanov | 2 November 1971 (aged 19) | | (Soviet Union) Spartak Moscow |
| 7 | MF | Dmytro Mykhaylenko | 13 July 1973 (aged 17) | | (Soviet Union) Dnipro Dnipropetrovsk |
| 8 | FW | Serhiy Scherbakov | 15 August 1971 (aged 19) | | (Soviet Union) Shakhtar Donetsk |
| 9 | FW | Dmitri Karsakov | 29 December 1971 (aged 19) | | (Soviet Union) CSKA Moscow |
| 10 | FW | Serhiy Konovalov | 1 March 1972 (aged 19) | | (Soviet Union) Dnipro Dnipropetrovsk |
| 11 | MF | Volodymyr Sharan | 18 September 1971 (aged 19) | | (Soviet Union) Karpaty Lviv |
| 12 | GK | Andrei Novosadov | 27 March 1972 (aged 19) | | (Soviet Union) CSKA Moscow |
| 13 | DF | Dmitri Klimovich | 30 April 1972 (aged 19) | | (Soviet Union) Dinamo Minsk |
| 14 | DF | Aleksei Guschin | 21 October 1971 (aged 19) | | (Soviet Union) CSKA Moscow |
| 15 | MF | Yuri Drozdov | 16 January 1972 (aged 19) | | (Soviet Union) Dynamo Moscow |
| 16 | MF | Vitali But | 16 November 1972 (aged 18) | | (Soviet Union) Dynamo Moscow |
| 17 | MF | Armen Babalaryan | 15 August 1971 (aged 19) | | (Soviet Union) Ararat Yerevan |
| 18 | MF | Yevhen Pokhlebayev | 25 November 1971 (aged 19) | | (Soviet Union) Dnipro Dnipropetrovsk |
| 19 | GK | Gennady Tumilovich | 3 September 1971 (aged 19) | | (Soviet Union) Dinamo Minsk |

=== Trinidad and Tobago ===
Head coach: (Trinidad and Tobago) Bertille St. Clair

| No. | Pos. | Player | Date of birth (age) | Caps | Club |
|---|---|---|---|---|---|
| 1 | GK | Michael McComie | 22 April 1972 (aged 19) | | (Trinidad and Tobago) St Augustine Senior Comprehensive School |
| 2 | DF | Shawn Boney | 28 August 1971 (aged 19) | | (Trinidad and Tobago) Malta Carib Alcons |
| 3 | DF | Kirk Trotman | 24 February 1972 (aged 19) | | (Trinidad and Tobago) Servol |
| 4 | MF | Nigel Davidson | 6 October 1971 (aged 19) | | (Trinidad and Tobago) St Clair's |
| 5 | MF | Dean Pacheco | 5 August 1972 (aged 18) | | (Trinidad and Tobago) ECM Motown |
| 6 | DF | Richard Theodore | 22 October 1971 (aged 19) | | (Trinidad and Tobago) Ball Youths |
| 7 | FW | Dwight Yorke | 3 November 1971 (aged 19) | | (England) Aston Villa |
| 8 | FW | Glen Benjamin | 4 April 1972 (aged 19) | | (Trinidad and Tobago) Ball Youths |
| 9 | MF | Kervin Emmanuel | 11 July 1973 (aged 17) | | (Trinidad and Tobago) Ball Youths |
| 10 | MF | Anthony Sherwood | 1 August 1971 (aged 19) | | (Trinidad and Tobago) Point Fortin Civic F.C. |
| 11 | FW | Jerren Nixon | 25 June 1973 (aged 17) | | (Trinidad and Tobago) Airport Authority |
| 12 | MF | Granville Millington | 25 December 1972 (aged 18) | | (Trinidad and Tobago) Ball Youths |
| 13 | DF | Dale Boucher | 24 December 1971 (aged 19) | | (Trinidad and Tobago) St Clair's |
| 14 | MF | Roger Henry | 16 December 1971 (aged 19) | | (Trinidad and Tobago) St Augustine Senior Comprehensive School |
| 15 | MF | Hayden James | 23 March 1972 (aged 19) | | (Trinidad and Tobago) St Clair's |
| 16 | FW | Angus Eve | 23 February 1972 (aged 19) | | (Trinidad and Tobago) ECM Motown |
| 17 | GK | Gavin Moze | 25 March 1972 (aged 19) | | (Trinidad and Tobago) St Mary's College |
| 18 | GK | Clayton Ince | 13 July 1972 (aged 18) | | (Trinidad and Tobago) Airport Authority |

== Group D ==
=== England ===
Head coach: (England) David Burnside

| No. | Pos. | Player | Date of birth (age) | Caps | Club |
|---|---|---|---|---|---|
| 1 | GK | Ian Walker | 31 October 1971 (aged 19) | | (England) Tottenham Hotspur |
| 2 | DF | Ian Hendon | 5 December 1971 (aged 19) | | (England) Tottenham Hotspur |
| 3 | DF | Alan Wright | 28 September 1971 (aged 19) | | (England) Blackpool |
| 4 | DF | Jason Kavanagh | 23 November 1971 (aged 19) | | (England) Derby County |
| 5 | DF | Dave Tuttle | 6 February 1972 (aged 19) | | (England) Tottenham Hotspur |
| 6 | DF | Andy Awford | 14 July 1972 (aged 18) | | (England) Portsmouth |
| 7 | MF | Steve Hayward | 8 September 1971 (aged 19) | | (England) Derby County |
| 8 | MF | Shaun Rouse | 28 February 1972 (aged 19) | | (Scotland) Rangers |
| 9 | FW | Andy Cole | 15 October 1971 (aged 19) | | (England) Arsenal |
| 10 | FW | Brian Mills | 26 December 1971 (aged 19) | | (England) Port Vale |
| 11 | DF | Scott Minto | 6 August 1971 (aged 19) | | (England) Charlton Athletic |
| 12 | MF | Scott Houghton | 22 October 1971 (aged 19) | | (England) Tottenham Hotspur |
| 13 | GK | Glen Livingstone | 13 October 1972 (aged 18) | | (England) Aston Villa |
| 14 | DF | Steve Harkness | 27 August 1971 (aged 19) | | (England) Liverpool |
| 15 | MF | Lee Clark | 27 October 1972 (aged 18) | | (England) Newcastle United |
| 16 | FW | Bradley Allen | 13 September 1971 (aged 19) | | (England) Queens Park Rangers |
| 17 | DF | Steve Watson | 1 April 1974 (aged 17) | | (England) Newcastle United |
| 18 | MF | Chris Bart-Williams | 16 June 1974 (aged 16) | | (England) Leyton Orient |

=== Spain ===
Head coach: (Spain) Chus Pereda

| No. | Pos. | Player | Date of birth (age) | Caps | Club |
|---|---|---|---|---|---|
| 1 | GK | Jaime Ferrer | 7 November 1971 (aged 19) | | (Spain) Sevilla |
| 2 | DF | Luci Martín | 17 August 1972 (aged 18) | | (Spain) Sevilla |
| 3 | DF | Juanlu | 7 November 1972 (aged 18) | | (Spain) Real Betis |
| 4 | FW | Ángel Cuéllar | 13 September 1972 (aged 18) | | (Spain) Real Betis |
| 5 | DF | Jesús Velasco | 16 January 1972 (aged 19) | | (Spain) Real Madrid |
| 6 | FW | Israel Izquierdo | 29 December 1971 (aged 19) | | (Spain) Hércules |
| 7 | FW | Ismael Urzaiz | 7 October 1971 (aged 19) | | (Spain) Real Madrid |
| 8 | MF | Alberto Benito | 17 June 1972 (aged 18) | | (Spain) Pegaso |
| 9 | MF | Javier Delgado | 3 July 1971 (aged 19) | | (Spain) Barcelona |
| 10 | MF | Óscar | 26 April 1973 (aged 18) | | (Spain) Barcelona |
| 11 | DF | Ramón de Quintana | 6 February 1971 (aged 20) | | (Spain) Damm |
| 12 | DF | Santi Cuesta | 11 August 1971 (aged 19) | | (Spain) Real Valladolid |
| 13 | GK | José Luis Martínez | 28 September 1971 (aged 19) | | (Spain) Real Betis |
| 14 | FW | José Luis Cantero | 9 August 1971 (aged 19) | | (Spain) Palencia |
| 15 | MF | Antonio Acosta | 22 November 1971 (aged 19) | | (Spain) Atlético Madrid |
| 16 | FW | Pier Luigi Cherubino | 15 October 1971 (aged 19) | | (Spain) Tenerife |
| 17 | MF | José Mauricio Casas | 9 October 1971 (aged 19) | | (Spain) Castellón |
| 18 | MF | Luis Márquez | 1 November 1971 (aged 19) | | (Spain) Real Betis |

=== Syria ===
Head coach: (Syria) Mahmoud Toughli

| No. | Pos. | Player | Date of birth (age) | Caps | Club |
|---|---|---|---|---|---|
| 1 | GK | Malek Koussa | 16 August 1971 (aged 19) | | (Syria) Jableh |
| 2 | DF | Yasser Sibai | 6 February 1972 (aged 19) | | (Syria) Al-Ittihad |
| 3 | MF | Georges Manaz | 31 December 1971 (aged 19) | | (Syria) Al-Horriya |
| 4 | MF | Mohamed Khonda | 15 September 1973 (aged 17) | | (Syria) Jableh |
| 5 | DF | Hussam Al Sayed | 1 July 1972 (aged 18) | | (Syria) Al-Wahda |
| 6 | MF | Fawaz Mando | 27 December 1971 (aged 19) | | (Syria) Al-Karamah |
| 7 | MF | Abdullah Mando | 9 October 1971 (aged 19) | | (Syria) Teshrin |
| 8 | DF | Ammar Awad | 1 August 1968 (aged 22) | | (Syria) Hutteen |
| 9 | FW | Munaf Ramadan | 19 October 1972 (aged 18) | | (Syria) Jableh |
| 10 | MF | Mohammad Afash | 31 October 1966 (aged 24) | | (Syria) Al-Ittihad |
| 11 | MF | Radwan Ajam | 20 November 1971 (aged 19) | | (Syria) Al-Karamah |
| 12 | DF | Mahmoud Abdul Razak | 27 November 1971 (aged 19) | | (Syria) Al-Futowa |
| 13 | FW | Abdul Latif Helou | 8 September 1971 (aged 19) | | (Syria) Al-Horriya |
| 14 | FW | Omar Kanafani | 9 October 1973 (aged 17) | | (Syria) Hutteen |
| 15 | DF | Hatem Ghaeb | 25 September 1971 (aged 19) | | (Syria) Al-Shorta |
| 16 | FW | Assaf al-Khalifa | 27 September 1971 (aged 19) | | (Syria) Al-Wahda |
| 17 | MF | Yasser Kaddo | 10 November 1973 (aged 17) | | (Syria) Al-Shorta |
| 18 | GK | Salem Bitar | 7 August 1973 (aged 17) | | (Syria) Al-Karamah |

=== Uruguay ===
Head coach: (Uruguay) Juan José Duarte

| No. | Pos. | Player | Date of birth (age) | Caps | Club |
|---|---|---|---|---|---|
| 1 | GK | Andrés Larrosa | 19 February 1972 (aged 19) | | (Uruguay) Wanderers |
| 2 | DF | Luis Márquez | 2 August 1971 (aged 19) | | (Uruguay) Bella Vista |
| 3 | DF | Robert Lima | 18 June 1972 (aged 18) | | (Uruguay) Peñarol |
| 4 | DF | Gerardo Severo | 29 March 1972 (aged 19) | | (Uruguay) Nacional |
| 5 | MF | Diego Dorta | 31 December 1971 (aged 19) | | (Uruguay) Peñarol |
| 6 | DF | Paolo Montero | 3 September 1971 (aged 19) | | (Uruguay) Peñarol |
| 7 | DF | Washington Tais | 21 December 1972 (aged 18) | | (Uruguay) Peñarol |
| 8 | MF | Líber Vespa | 18 October 1971 (aged 19) | | (Uruguay) Cerro |
| 9 | FW | Gustavo Ferreyra | 29 May 1972 (aged 19) | | (Uruguay) Peñarol |
| 10 | MF | Marcelo Tejera | 6 August 1973 (aged 17) | | (Uruguay) Defensor Sporting |
| 11 | FW | Sergio Vázquez | 14 October 1972 (aged 18) | | (Uruguay) Wanderers |
| 12 | GK | Alejandro Mitarian | 2 January 1973 (aged 18) | | (Uruguay) Peñarol |
| 13 | MF | Alvaro Marenco | 18 January 1972 (aged 19) | | (Uruguay) Peñarol |
| 14 | MF | Mario Peñalba | 20 August 1972 (aged 18) | | (Uruguay) Nacional |
| 15 | MF | Gustavo Martínez | 16 October 1972 (aged 18) | | (Uruguay) Peñarol |
| 16 | FW | Darío Silva | 2 November 1972 (aged 18) | | (Uruguay) Defensor Sporting |
| 17 | FW | Osvaldo Canobbio | 17 February 1973 (aged 18) | | (Uruguay) River Plate |
| 18 | FW | Josemir Lujambio | 25 September 1971 (aged 19) | | (Uruguay) Defensor Sporting |
