= 1990 UEFA European Under-18 Championship squads =

Player listings in youth football competition

Players in bold have later been capped at full international level.

== Belgium ==
Head coach:

No.	Pos.	Player	Date of birth (age)	Caps	Goals	Club
	GK	Ben Lambeets	31 August 1971 (aged 18)			(Royal Belgian Football Association) Standard Liège
	GK	Serge Sironval	3 September 1971 (aged 18)			(Royal Belgian Football Association) R.S.C. Anderlecht
	DF	Johnny Bleyaert	6 January 1972 (aged 18)			(Royal Belgian Football Association) Cercle Brugge
	DF	Bertrand Crassoni	5 October 1971 (aged 18)			(Royal Belgian Football Association) R.S.C. Anderlecht
	DF	Andy Degryse	4 August 1971 (aged 18)			(Royal Belgian Football Association) Cercle Brugge
	DF	Olivier Suray	16 October 1971 (aged 18)			(Royal Belgian Football Association) R. Charleroi S.C.
	DF	Bert Vleeschuwer	26 September 1971 (aged 18)			(Royal Belgian Football Association) K.S.K. Beveren
	MF	Roch Gérard	4 January 1972 (aged 18)			(Royal Belgian Football Association) R. Charleroi S.C.
	MF	Peter Jacobs	22 September 1971 (aged 18)			(Royal Belgian Football Association) KV Mechelen
	MF	Kurt Mattheus	20 April 1972 (aged 18)			(Royal Belgian Football Association) KV Mechelen
	MF	Hervé Van Overtvelt	22 October 1971 (aged 18)			(Royal Belgian Football Association) K.S.K. Beveren
	MF	Gunther Tas	1 September 1971 (aged 18)			(Royal Belgian Football Association) KVC Westerlo
	MF	**Johan Walem**	1 February 1972 (aged 18)			(Royal Belgian Football Association) R.S.C. Anderlecht
	FW	**Gert Claessens**	21 February 1972 (aged 18)			(Royal Belgian Football Association) R.F.C. de Liège
	FW	Kris Vangaever	15 February 1972 (aged 18)			(Royal Belgian Football Association) Cercle Brugge
	FW	Philippe Veldic	3 September 1971 (aged 18)			(Royal Belgian Football Association) R. Charleroi S.C.

== England ==
Head coach:

No.	Pos.	Player	Date of birth (age)	Caps	Club
1	GK	**Ian Walker**	31 October 1971 (aged 18)		(England) Tottenham Hotspur
2	DF	Jason Kavanagh	23 November 1971 (aged 18)		(England) Derby County
3	DF	Alan Wright	28 September 1971 (aged 18)		(England) Blackpool F.C.
4	DF	Steve Hayward	8 September 1971 (aged 18)		(England) Derby County
5	DF	Dave Tuttle	6 February 1972 (aged 18)		(England) Tottenham Hotspur
6	DF	Andy Awford	14 July 1972 (aged 18)		(England) Portsmouth F.C.
7	MF	Steve Harkness	27 August 1971 (aged 18)		(England) Liverpool F.C.
8	MF	Shaun Rouse	28 February 1972 (aged 18)		(Scotland) Rangers F.C.
9	FW	**Andy Cole**	15 October 1971 (aged 18)		(England) Arsenal F.C.
10	FW	Aidan Newhouse	23 May 1972 (aged 18)		(England) Wimbledon F.C.
11	MF	Scott Houghton	22 October 1971 (aged 18)		(England) Tottenham Hotspur
12	DF	Bryan Small	15 November 1971 (aged 18)		(England) Aston Villa
13	FW	Bradley Allen	13 September 1971 (aged 18)		(England) Queens Park Rangers
14	MF	Lee Clark	27 October 1972 (aged 17)		(England) Newcastle United
15	GK	Glen Livingstone	13 October 1972 (aged 17)		(England) Aston Villa
16	DF	Ian Hendon	5 December 1971 (aged 18)		(England) Tottenham Hotspur

== Hungary ==
Head coach: Janos Ziegler

No.	Pos.	Player	Date of birth (age)	Caps	Goals	Club
	GK	András Elbert	28 August 1972 (aged 17)			(Hungarian Football Federation) Budapesti Honvéd
	GK	János Vámos	19 January 1972 (aged 18)			(Hungarian Football Federation) Csepel SC
	DF	József Csányi	6 October 1973 (aged 16)			
	DF	Gábor Gréczi	25 October 1971 (aged 18)			
	DF	**Péter Lipcsei**	28 March 1972 (aged 18)			(Hungarian Football Federation) Ferencvárosi TC
	DF	József Szabados	7 December 1971 (aged 18)			(Hungarian Football Federation) Budapesti Honvéd
	DF	Tamás Szönyi	23 July 1972 (aged 18)			(Hungarian Football Federation) Békéscsabai Előre
	MF	Balázs Bekő	15 December 1971 (aged 18)			(Hungarian Football Federation) Videoton-Waltham
	MF	Zsolt Bencze	12 February 1972 (aged 18)			(Hungarian Football Federation) Békéscsabai Előre
	MF	**Gábor Halmai**	7 January 1972 (aged 18)			(Hungarian Football Federation) Videoton-Waltham
	MF	Ferenc Szilveszter	26 November 1971 (aged 18)			(Hungarian Football Federation) Vasas SC
	MF	Gábor Wendler	30 November 1971 (aged 18)			(Hungarian Football Federation) MTK-VM
	FW	Attila Jezsek	12 October 1971 (aged 18)			(Hungarian Football Federation) Csepel SC
	FW	Zsolt Kasik	4 August 1971 (aged 18)			(Hungarian Football Federation) Békéscsabai Előre
	MF	Attila Szabó	8 August 1971 (aged 18)			
	FW	Gusztáv Vajda	17 August 1971 (aged 18)			(Hungarian Football Federation) Videoton-Waltham

== Portugal ==
Head coach: (Portugal) Carlos Queiroz

No.	Pos.	Player	Date of birth (age)	Caps	Club
1	GK	Jorge Silva	13 January 1972 (aged 18)		(Portugal) FC Porto
2	DF	**Abel Xavier**	30 November 1972 (aged 17)		(Portugal) Estrela Amadora
3	FW	Paulo Pilar	3 January 1972 (aged 18)		(Portugal) Sporting CP
4	MF	**Luís Figo**	4 November 1972 (aged 17)		(Portugal) Sporting CP
5	MF	**Rui Costa**	28 March 1972 (aged 18)		(Portugal) Benfica
6	MF	**João Oliveira Pinto**	3 August 1971 (aged 18)		(Portugal) Sporting CP
7	DF	Álvaro Gregório	25 August 1972 (aged 17)		(Portugal) FC Porto
8	MF	**Rui Bento**	14 January 1972 (aged 18)		(Portugal) Benfica
9	FW	**João V. Pinto**	19 August 1971 (aged 18)		(Spain) Atlético Madrid B
10	DF	**Jorge Costa**	14 October 1971 (aged 18)		(Portugal) FC Porto
11	FW	Toni	2 August 1972 (aged 17)		(Portugal) Porto
12	GK	Fernando Brassard	11 April 1972 (aged 18)		(Portugal) Louletano
13	DF	Luis Miguel	24 July 1972 (aged 18)		(Portugal) Rio Ave
14	DF	**Peixe**	16 January 1973 (aged 17)		(Portugal) Sporting CP
15	FW	Gil Gomes	2 December 1972 (aged 17)		(Portugal) Benfica
16	DF	**Paulo Torres**	25 November 1971 (aged 18)		(Portugal) Sporting CP

== Republic of Ireland ==
Head coach: Maurice Setters

No.	Pos.	Player	Date of birth (age)	Caps	Club
1	GK	John Connolly	28 December 1971 (aged 18)		(Republic of Ireland) Cherry Orchard
2	DF	David Collins	30 October 1971 (aged 18)		(England) Liverpool
3	DF	Tommy Dunne	27 April 1972 (aged 18)		(Republic of Ireland) Home Farm
4	DF	Paul McCarthy	4 August 1971 (aged 18)		(England) Brighton & Hove Albion
5	DF	John Carroll	13 October 1971 (aged 18)		(England) Liverpool F.C.
6	MF	**Roy Keane**	10 August 1971 (aged 18)		(Republic of Ireland) Cobh Ramblers
7	MF	Kieron Brady	27 September 1971 (aged 18)		(England) Sunderland
8	MF	Gary Fitzpatrick	5 August 1971 (aged 18)		(England) Leicester City
9	FW	Lee Power	30 June 1972 (aged 18)		(England) Norwich City
10	FW	Barry O'Connor	17 June 1972 (aged 18)		(Republic of Ireland) Kildare County
11	MF	Brian Byrne	23 March 1972 (aged 18)		(Republic of Ireland) Longford Town
12	FW	Jason Byrne	16 May 1972 (aged 18)		(England) Huddersfield Town A.F.C.
13	MF	Paul Byrne	30 June 1972 (aged 18)		(England) Oxford United
14	DF	Ken Gillard	30 April 1972 (aged 18)		(Republic of Ireland) Belvedere
15	MF	Richard Purdy	12 March 1972 (aged 18)		(Republic of Ireland) Kildare County
16	GK	Brian McKenna	30 January 1972 (aged 18)		(Republic of Ireland) St Patrick's Athletic

(N°5)John Carroll DF 13/10/1971 Liverpool F.C. England (N°12)Jason Byrne FW 16/05/1972 Huddersfield F.C. England

== Soviet Union ==
Head coach: (Soviet Union) Gennadi Kostylev

No.	Pos.	Player	Date of birth (age)	Caps	Club
1	GK	**Oleksandr Pomazun**	11 October 1971 (aged 18)		(Soviet Union) Metalist Kharkiv
2	DF	**Yervand Krbachyan**	1 October 1971 (aged 18)		(Soviet Union) Ararat Yerevan
3	MF	**Sergei Mandreko**	1 August 1971 (aged 18)		(Soviet Union) Vakhsh Kourgan‑Tyube
4	DF	Sergei Mamchur	3 February 1972 (aged 18)		(Soviet Union) Dnipro Dnipropetrovsk
5	DF	**Valeri Minko**	8 August 1971 (aged 18)		(Soviet Union) CSKA Moscow
6	DF	**Yevgeni Bushmanov**	2 November 1971 (aged 18)		(Soviet Union) Spartak Moscow
7	MF	**Yevhen Pokhlebayev**	25 November 1971 (aged 18)		(Soviet Union) Dnipro Dnipropetrovsk
8	MF	**Serhiy Scherbakov**	15 August 1971 (aged 18)		(Soviet Union) Shakhtar Donetsk
9	MF	Aleksandr Grishin	18 November 1971 (aged 18)		(Soviet Union) CSKA Moscow
10	FW	Ruslan Lukin	11 November 1971 (aged 18)		(Soviet Union) Dinamo Minsk
11	MF	**Volodymyr Sharan**	18 September 1971 (aged 18)		(Soviet Union) Karpaty Lviv
12	DF	Aleksei Guschin	21 October 1971 (aged 18)		(Soviet Union) CSKA Moscow
13	MF	**Serhiy Kandaurov**	2 February 1972 (aged 18)		(Soviet Union) Metalist Kharkiv
14	DF	**Tarlan Ahmadov**	11 November 1971 (aged 18)		(Soviet Union) Neftchi Baku
15	DF	**Andrey Shkurin**	3 March 1972 (aged 18)		(Soviet Union) FShM Moscow
16	GK	**Andrei Novosadov**	27 March 1972 (aged 18)		(Soviet Union) CSKA Moscow

== Spain ==
Head coach: (Spain) Chus Pereda

No.	Pos.	Player	Date of birth (age)	Caps	Club
1	GK	Julio Iglesias	26 September 1972 (aged 17)		(Spain) Barcelona
2	DF	José Miguel Prieto	22 November 1971 (aged 18)		(Spain) Sevilla
3	DF	Santi Cuesta	11 August 1971 (aged 18)		(Spain) Valladolid
4	DF	Juanlu	7 November 1972 (aged 17)		(Spain) Betis
5	DF	José Luis Gallardo	22 September 1971 (aged 18)		(Spain) Hospitalet
6	MF	Javi Delgado	3 July 1972 (aged 18)		(Spain) Barcelona
7	FW	Manolo	28 October 1971 (aged 18)		(Spain) Betis
8	DF	Jesús Enrique Velasco	16 January 1972 (aged 18)		(Spain) Real Madrid
9	FW	**Alfonso Pérez**	26 September 1972 (aged 17)		(Spain) Real Madrid
10	FW	Mauricio	9 October 1971 (aged 18)		(Spain) Pontevedra
11	FW	**Ángel Cuéllar**	13 September 1972 (aged 17)		(Spain) Betis
12	DF	Juan López Bravo	25 October 1971 (aged 18)		(Spain) Barcelona
13	GK	José Luis	28 September 1971 (aged 18)		(Spain) Betis
14	MF	Blas Candela	10 January 1972 (aged 18)		(Spain) Barcelona
15	MF	Esteban Torre	3 September 1971 (aged 18)		(Spain) Racing de Santander
16	MF	Luis Márquez	1 November 1971 (aged 18)		(Spain) Betis

== Sweden ==
Head coach:

No.	Pos.	Player	Date of birth (age)	Caps	Goals	Club
	GK	Mats Svensson	22 November 1971 (aged 19)			(Swedish Football Association) Landskrona
	DF	**Magnus Johansson**	10 November 1971 (aged 19)			(Swedish Football Association) IFK Göteborg
	DF	Henrik Nilsson	25 July 1972 (aged 18)			(Swedish Football Association) Malmö FF
	DF	Glenn Ståhl	25 August 1971 (aged 19)			(Swedish Football Association) IFK Värnamo
	DF	Rasmus Svensson	5 September 1971 (aged 19)			(Swedish Football Association) Malmö FF
	MF	**Niclas Alexandersson**	29 December 1971 (aged 19)			(Swedish Football Association) Halmstads BK
	MF	**Patrik Andersson**	18 August 1971 (aged 19)			(Swedish Football Association) Malmö FF
	MF	Ulf Lilius	27 January 1972 (aged 19)			(Swedish Football Association) Helsingborgs IF
	MF	Roger Nordstrand	20 May 1973 (aged 18)			(Swedish Football Association) Örgryte IS
	MF	**Jonny Rödlund**	22 December 1971 (aged 19)			(Swedish Football Association) IFK Norrköping
	FW	**Niklas Gudmundsson**	29 February 1972 (aged 19)			(Swedish Football Association) Halmstads BK
	FW	Jonny Hägerå	10 September 1971 (aged 19)			(Swedish Football Association) Örgryte IS
	FW	Issa Manglind	22 September 1971 (aged 19)			(Swedish Football Association) Landskrona BoIS
	FW	Jens Svensson	27 March 1972 (aged 19)			(Swedish Football Association) Mjälby AIF
