= 2014 Argentine Primera División =

124th season of top-tier football league in Argentina

Primera División
- Season: 2014
- Champions: Racing (17th title)
- Relegated: No relegation this season
- 2015 Copa Libertadores: Racing; San Lorenzo (via 2014 Copa Libertadores); Huracán (via 2013–14 Copa Argentina); Estudiantes (LP) (via 2014 Copa Sudamericana)
- 2015 Copa Sudamericana: Lanús; Independiente; Tigre; Arsenal; Belgrano; River Plate (via 2014 Copa Sudamericana); Huracán (via 2014 Supercopa Argentina)
- Matches: 190
- Goals: 491 (2.58 per match)
- Top goalscorer: Lucas Pratto; Maxi Rodríguez; Silvio Romero (11 goals each)
- Biggest home win: Tigre 4–0 Racing (August 22, 2014); Quilmes 4–0 Arsenal (September 8, 2014); San Lorenzo 4–0 Belgrano (November 15, 2014); San Lorenzo 4–0 Estudiantes (LP) (November 29, 2014); Belgrano 4–0 Independiente (December 6, 2014)
- Biggest away win: Atlético de Rafaela 1–6 Arsenal (December 6, 2014)
- Highest scoring: Independiente 5–3 Quilmes (September 13, 2014) (8 goals)

The 2014 Torneo de Transición or Torneo Doctor Ramón Carrillo was the 124th season of top-flight professional football in Argentina. The season was scheduled to start on August 1, 2014 but was postponed after the death of Julio Grondona, president of the AFA on July 30. Finally, it began on August 8, 2014 and ended on December 14, 2014. Originally the last match of the tournament was scheduled on December 7 but as River Plate played the finals of the 2014 Copa Sudamericana the matches Racing-Godoy Cruz and River Plate-Quilmes were played on December 14. Twenty teams competed in the league, seventeen returning from the 2013–14 season and three promoted from the 2013–14 Primera B Nacional (Championship winners Banfield, runners-up Defensa y Justicia, and 3rd place Independiente).

Colón, Argentinos Juniors and All Boys had been relegated to the Primera B Nacional championship in the previous season.

== Format ==
The team with most points was the champion and qualified for the 2015 Copa Libertadores group stage.

No teams were relegated this season as the league was expanded to 30 teams in the new 2015 Primera División.

== Club information ==
Locations of the 2014 Torneo de Transición teams outside Greater Buenos Aires.
Locations of the 2014 Primera División teams within Greater Buenos Aires.

Club	City	Stadium	Capacity	Manager
Arsenal	Sarandí	Julio H. Grondona	16,300	Martín Palermo
Atlético de Rafaela	Rafaela	Nuevo Monumental	16,000	Roberto Sensini
Banfield	Banfield	Florencio Solá	34,901	Matías Almeyda
Belgrano	Córdoba	Julio César Villagra	28,000	Ricardo Zielinski
Boca Juniors	Buenos Aires	Alberto J. Armando	49,000	Rodolfo Arruabarrena
Defensa y Justicia	Florencio Varela	Norberto "Tito" Tomaghello	12,000	Darío Franco
Estudiantes (LP)	La Plata	Ciudad de La Plata	53,000	Mauricio Pellegrino
Gimnasia y Esgrima (LP)	La Plata	Juan Carmelo Zerillo	24,544	Pedro Troglio
Godoy Cruz	Godoy Cruz	Malvinas Argentinas	40,268	Daniel Oldrá
Independiente	Avellaneda	Libertadores de América	52,853	Jorge Almirón
Lanús	Lanús	Ciudad de Lanús - Néstor Díaz Pérez	46,619	Guillermo Barros Schelotto
Newell's Old Boys	Rosario	Marcelo Bielsa	38,095	Gustavo Raggio
Olimpo	Bahía Blanca	Roberto Natalio Carminatti	20,000	Walter Perazzo
Quilmes	Quilmes	Centenario	30,200	Marcelo Pontiroli
Racing	Avellaneda	Presidente Juan Domingo Perón	55,389	Diego Cocca
River Plate	Buenos Aires	Monumental Antonio Vespucio Liberti	61,321	Marcelo Gallardo
Rosario Central	Rosario	Dr. Lisandro de la Torre	41,654	Hugo Galloni
San Lorenzo	Buenos Aires	Pedro Bidegain	39,494	Edgardo Bauza
Tigre	Victoria	José Dellagiovanna	26,282	Gustavo Alfaro
Vélez Sarsfield	Buenos Aires	José Amalfitani	45,540	José Oscar Flores

=== Personnel and sponsors ===
Club	Manager	Kit manufacturer	Main sponsor
Arsenal	(Argentina) Martín Palermo	Lotto	La Nueva Seguros
Atlético de Rafaela	(Argentina) Roberto Sensini	Reusch	SanCor
Banfield	(Argentina) Matías Almeyda	Penalty	Banco Provincia
Belgrano	(Argentina) Ricardo Zielinski	Lotto	Tersuave
Boca Juniors	(Argentina) Rodolfo Arruabarrena	Nike	BBVA
Defensa y Justicia	(Argentina) Darío Franco	Lyon	Dar Salud
Estudiantes (LP)	(Argentina) Mauricio Pellegrino	Adidas	DirecTV
Gimnasia y Esgrima (LP)	(Argentina) Pedro Troglio	Penalty	Liderar Seguros
Godoy Cruz	(Argentina) Daniel Oldrá	Lotto	Mendoza Espíritu Grande
Independiente	(Argentina) Jorge Almirón	Puma	Correo OCA
Lanús	(Argentina) Guillermo Barros Schelotto	KDY	Yamaha
Newell's Old Boys	(Argentina) Gustavo Raggio	Topper	Banco Ciudad
Olimpo	(Argentina) Walter Perazzo	Kappa	Bingo Bahía
Quilmes	(Argentina) Marcelo Pontiroli	Lotto	Quilmes
Racing	(Argentina) Diego Cocca	Topper	Banco Hipotecario
River Plate	(Argentina) Marcelo Gallardo	Adidas	BBVA
Rosario Central	(Argentina) Hugo Galloni	Olympikus	Banco Municipal
San Lorenzo	(Argentina) Edgardo Bauza	Lotto	Banco Ciudad
Tigre	(Argentina) Gustavo Alfaro	Kappa	Banco Macro
Vélez Sarsfield	(Argentina) José Oscar Flores	Topper	Samsung

=== Managerial changes ===
Team	Outgoing manager	Manner of departure	Date of vacancy	Replaced by	Date of appointment	Position in table
Pre-season changes
Atlético de Rafaela	(Argentina) Jorge Burruchaga	Resigned	May 26, 2014	(Argentina) Roberto Sensini	June 8, 2014	N/A
Quilmes	(Argentina) Ricardo Caruso Lombardi	Mutual agreement	May 27, 2014	(Argentina) Pablo Quatrocchi	June 9, 2014	N/A
River Plate	(Argentina) Ramón Díaz	Resigned	May 27, 2014	(Argentina) Marcelo Gallardo	June 6, 2014	N/A
Defensa y Justicia	(Argentina) Diego Cocca	Resigned	June 8, 2014	(Argentina) Darío Franco	June 8, 2014	N/A
Racing	(Argentina) Fabio Radaelli	Replaced	June 8, 2014	(Argentina) Diego Cocca	June 8, 2014	N/A
Newell's Old Boys	(Argentina) Ricardo Lunari	Replaced	June 10, 2014	(Argentina) Gustavo Raggio	June 10, 2014	N/A
Independiente	(Argentina) Omar De Felippe	Resigned	July 16, 2014	(Argentina) Jorge Almirón	July 18, 2014	N/A
Godoy Cruz	(Argentina) Jorge Almirón	Resigned	July 17, 2014	(Argentina) Carlos Mayor	July 18, 2014	N/A
Torneo de Transición changes
Boca Juniors	(Argentina) Carlos Bianchi	Sacked	August 28, 2014	(Argentina) Rodolfo Arruabarrena	August 29, 2014	18th
Tigre	(Argentina) Fabián Alegre	Mutual agreement	September 1, 2014	(Argentina) Gustavo Alfaro ^{1}	September 5, 2014	16th
Godoy Cruz	(Argentina) Carlos Mayor	Sacked	November 2, 2014	(Argentina) Daniel Oldrá ^{2}	November 3, 2014	17th
Rosario Central	(Argentina) Miguel Ángel Russo	Resigned	November 28, 2014	(Argentina) Hugo Galloni ^{3}	November 28, 2014	18th
Quilmes	(Argentina) Pablo Quatrocchi	Mutual agreement	December 5, 2014	(Argentina) Marcelo Pontiroli ^{4}	December 5, 2014	20th

Interim Managers

1. (Argentina) Fabián Castro was interim manager in the 6th round.
2. Interim manager, but later promoted to full-time manager.
3. Interim manager.
4. Interim manager.

== International qualification ==
Argentina had 6 berths in the 2015 Copa Libertadores (The first 4 berths were for the second stage and the last 2 for the first stage). San Lorenzo (Argentina 1), and River Plate (Argentina 2), were qualified as the 2014 Copa Libertadores and the 2014 Torneo Final champions, respectively. The Torneo de Transición champions (Racing) obtained the Argentina 3 berth. The Argentina 4 berth was awarded to the 2013–14 Primera División aggregate table best team not yet qualified (Boca Juniors). The 2015 Copa Libertadores first stage berths (Argentina 5 and Argentina 6) were awarded via 2013–14 Copa Argentina (Huracán) and via 2014 Copa Sudamericana (Estudiantes (LP)), respectively.

Argentina had 7 berths in the 2015 Copa Sudamericana. River Plate was qualified as the 2014 Copa Sudamericana champions. The other 6 berths were awarded to the 5 best teams of the Torneo de Transición if they are not qualified for 2015 Copa Libertadores second stage and the 2014 Supercopa Argentina champions, Huracán.

== Standings ==
Pos	Team	Pld	W	D	L	GF	GA	GD	Pts	Qualification
1	Racing	19	13	2	4	30	16	+14	41	2015 Copa Libertadores second stage
2	River Plate	19	11	6	2	34	13	+21	39	2015 Copa Libertadores second stage and 2015 Copa Sudamericana Round of 16 (Note: Qualified as 2014 Torneo Final champion and 2014 Copa Sudamericana champion)
3	Lanús	19	10	5	4	28	23	+5	35	2015 Copa Sudamericana second stage
4	Independiente	19	10	3	6	31	29	+2	33	2015 Copa Sudamericana second stage
5	Boca Juniors	19	9	4	6	25	23	+2	31	2015 Copa Libertadores second stage
6	Estudiantes (LP)	19	9	4	6	23	23	0	31	2015 Copa Libertadores first stage (Note: Qualified as 2014 Copa Sudamericana best Argentine team not yet qualified.)
7	Tigre	19	8	2	9	30	26	+4	26	2015 Copa Sudamericana second stage
8	San Lorenzo	19	8	2	9	26	22	+4	26	2015 Copa Libertadores second stage (Note: Qualified as 2014 Copa Libertadores champion)
9	Arsenal	19	7	5	7	27	25	+2	26	2015 Copa Sudamericana second stage
10	Belgrano	19	7	4	8	26	26	0	25	2015 Copa Sudamericana second stage
11	Vélez Sarsfield	19	7	4	8	21	22	−1	25	
12	Newell's Old Boys	19	6	7	6	21	24	−3	25	
13	Atlético de Rafaela	19	7	4	8	25	29	−4	25	
14	Gimnasia y Esgrima (LP)	19	6	6	7	16	15	+1	24	
15	Rosario Central	19	6	3	10	21	28	−7	21	
16	Godoy Cruz	19	5	6	8	31	39	−8	21	
17	Banfield	19	5	5	9	25	25	0	20	
18	Defensa y Justicia	19	5	5	9	19	30	−11	20	
19	Olimpo	19	4	7	8	15	22	−7	19	
20	Quilmes	19	2	6	11	17	31	−14	12	

Source: Programación de Primera División Torneo Final 2013/2014
Notes:

Primera División
2014 Torneo de Transición champion

17th title

== Results ==
Home \ Away	ARS	ATR	BAN	BEL	BOC	DYJ	EST	GLP	GCR	IND	LAN	NOB	OLI	QUI	RAC	RIV	RCE	SLO	TIG	VEL
Arsenal			1–0	0–2	1–1		2–1	1–0	3–0	1–1			1–0			1–1		0–0		
Atlético de Rafaela	1–6		2–2				1–0	2–0	3–4		2–1	2–3	0–0			1–2		2–0		
Banfield				2–2	1–1	2–3	1–1			0–1			3–0	3–1			2–3		1–0	
Belgrano		3–0			0–1	3–0		0–0		4–0				1–1	1–4		1–0		1–2	1–0
Boca Juniors		0–3				2–0		0–2		3–1		0–1		1–0	1–2		2–1		2–0	3–1
Defensa y Justicia	2–1	2–1									1–2	1–0		1–1	1–3		1–3	1–3		0–2
Estudiantes (LP)				3–1	3–1	0–0		0–0		1–0				1–0	0–4		1–0		4–2	3–2
Gimnasia y Esgrima (LP)			1–1			0–3			2–0				0–0	3–0	0–1	1–1	1–2			2–0
Godoy Cruz			3–0	1–3	2–3	1–1	1–1			2–2			0–3			0–4			4–3	
Independiente		3–0				1–1		0–1			4–1	1–0		5–3	2–1		2–0		3–1	0–4
Lanús	3–2		1–0	1–0	2–2		2–1	2–0	3–3				1–1			1–1		1–0		
Newell's Old Boys	2–4		0–3	3–3			1–0	1–1	2–2		0–0		1–0			0–1		3–1		
Olimpo				1–0	0–1	0–0	1–2			1–2				2–1	1–1		1–1		2–1	
Quilmes	4–0	0–0							2–2		0–2	1–1			0–1	0–1		0–3		2–1
Racing	1–0	0–2	1–0						1–0		1–3	1–1				1–0		2–0		2–0
River Plate			3–2	3–0	1–1	3–0	0–1			4–1			1–1				2–0		2–0	
Rosario Central	3–1	0–2							0–1		1–2	2–0		3–1	0–3			1–1		0–0
San Lorenzo			0–2	4–0	2–0		4–0	0–2	2–1	1–2			2–0			1–3			0–2	
Tigre	1–1	3–1				2–1		1–0			3–0	1–2		0–0	4–0		4–1			0–1
Vélez Sarsfield	2–1	0–0	1–0						1–4		1–0	0–0	4–1			1–1		0–2		

Source: Programación de Primera División Torneo Final 2013/2014
Legend: Blue = home team win; Yellow = draw; Red = away team win.

== Season statistics ==
=== Top goalscorers ===
Rank	Player	Club	Goals
1	(Argentina) Lucas Pratto	Vélez Sarsfield	11
1	(Argentina) Maxi Rodríguez	Newell's Old Boys	11
1	(Argentina) Silvio Romero	Lanús	11
4	(Argentina) Gustavo Bou	Racing	10
4	(Colombia) Teófilo Gutiérrez	River Plate	10
4	(Argentina) Federico Mancuello	Independiente	10
7	(Ecuador) Jaime Ayoví	Godoy Cruz	9
7	(Uruguay) Brahian Alemán	Arsenal	9
9	(Argentina) Julio Furch	Belgrano	8
10	(Argentina) Carlos Luna	Tigre	7
10	(Argentina) Rubén Ramírez	Godoy Cruz	7
10	(Argentina) Pablo Vegetti	Gimnasia y Esgrima (LP)	7
10	(Argentina) Emilio Zelaya	Arsenal	7
