= Fernando Zagharián =

Argentine-Armenian footballer

Personal information
- Full name: Fernando Zagharián
- Date of birth: January 13, 1977 (age 49)
- Place of birth: Buenos Aires Province, Argentina
- Height: 1.71 m (5 ft 7 in)
- Position: Striker

Senior career*
Years	Team	Apps	(Gls)
1998–2002	Argentinos Juniors	54	(7)
2002	FC Pyunik	9	(1)
2003–2004	Brown de Adrogué	89 total	(23)
2004	Emelec	11	(1)
2005–2006	Deportivo Morón	11	(0)
2006–2008	Brown de Adrogué	(see above)	
2008–2009	Talleres (RE)	36	(4)
2009–2011	Brown de Adrogué		
- * Club domestic league appearances and goals as of August 24, 2007

Fernando Zagharián (born January 13, 1977, in Argentina) is a former football striker who was born and raised in Argentina, but now has dual nationality with Armenia due to his Armenian origin.

He played for Argentinos Juniors (1998–02), FC Pyunik (2002–03), Atlético Brown (2003–04), Emelec (2004–05), Deportivo Morón (2005–06), Atlético Brown (2006–08) again and Club Atlético Talleres de Remedios de Escalada (2008–09). He ended his career at Brown at the end of the 2010–11 season.
