= Orlando Nappe =

Argentine footballer

Orlando Nappe (c. 1931 in Buenos Aires – 2007) was an Argentine footballer. He capped 121 matches (as a defender and as a midfielder) scoring 11 goals.

He played for Club Atlético Huracán (1950–1952) and Argentinos Juniors (1956–1959).
