= Osvaldo Sosa =

Argentine footballer and manager (1945–2020)

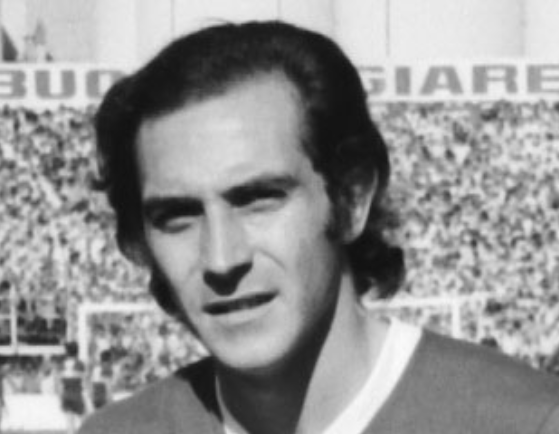
- playing for Ferro in 1972

Personal information
- Date of birth: 26 January 1945
- Place of birth: Buenos Aires, Argentina
- Date of death: 6 July 2020 (aged 75)
- Place of death: Buenos Aires
- Position: Midfielder

Senior career*
Years	Team	Apps	(Gls)
1964–1966	Almagro	?	(?)
1966–1968	Argentinos Juniors	124 (total)	(34)
1969	Independiente	5	(0)
1969	Ferro Carril Oeste	?	(?)
1970–1971	Argentinos Juniors	(see above)	

Managerial career
- 1970–1971: Argentinos Juniors
- 1974: Argentinos Juniors
- 1980–1981: Almagro
- 1981: Argentinos Juniors
- 1981: Tigre
- 1983: Huracán
- 1984: Colón
- 1988–1989: Deportivo Armenio
- 1989–1990: Mandiyú
- 1991–1992: Racing Club
- 1992–1994: Argentinos Juniors
- 1995: Mandiyú
- 1995–1996: Talleres
- 1997–2000: Argentinos Juniors
- 2000–2002: Chacarita Juniors
- 2002–2003: Lanús
- 2003: Independiente
- 2004–2005: Argentinos Juniors
- 2005–2006: Quilmes
- 2009-2010: Atlético Tucumán
- * Club domestic league appearances and goals as of 22:19, 24 November 2009 (UTC)

Osvaldo Sosa (26 January 1945 – 6 July 2020) was an Argentine football manager and player who worked as the manager of Atlético Tucumán in the Primera División Argentina.

== Playing career ==
Sosa began his playing career in 1964 with Almagro. In 1966 he joined Primera División side Argentinos Juniors where he played over 100 games over his two stints with the club. He also played for Independiente and Ferro Carril Oeste.

== Managerial career ==
Sosa had his first attempt at management as the player-coach of Argentinos Juniors between 1970 and 1971. He went on to manage the club another 5 times (1974, 1981, 1992–94, 1997-2000 and 2004–05). Sosa also returned to two of his other former clubs as manager, Almagro in 1980-81 and Independiente in 2003.

Some of Sosa's other clubs include two stints as manager of Mandiyú and single spells in charge of Tigre, Huracán, Colón, Deportivo Armenio, Racing Club, Talleres, Chacarita Juniors, Lanús, Quilmes and Atlético Tucumán.
