= Raúl Sanzotti =

Argentine footballer

Personal information
- Full name: Raúl Alejandro Celis Sanzotti
- Date of birth: 12 January 1975 (age 51)
- Place of birth: Córdoba, Argentina
- Height: 1.82 m (6 ft 0 in)
- Position: Goalkeeper

Youth career
- 1989–1994: Deportivo Merlo

Senior career*
Years	Team	Apps	(Gls)
1995–2003	Argentinos Juniors	85	(0)
2003–2004	Belgrano	58	(0)
2005–2006	Cobresal	64	(0)
2007	Deportes Concepción	18	(0)
2008–2010	Defensores de Belgrano	23	(1)
2010	Racing de Córdoba	18	(0)
2011	Huaracán TA	33	(0)

International career
1991	Argentina U17	6	(0)

Managerial career
- 2016: Argentinos Juniors (youth)
- 2016: Argentinos Juniors (interim)
- 2017–2018: Argentinos Juniors (reserves)
- 2018: Argentinos Juniors (interim)
- * Club domestic league appearances and goals

Raúl Alejandro Celis Sanzotti (born 12 January 1975) is an Argentine retired footballer who played as goalkeeper.

== Club career ==
A product of Argentinos Juniors, Celis Sanzotti made his senior debut against Racing Club for the 1996 Supercopa Libertadores.

Besides Argentina, Celis Sanzotti played in Chile for Cobresal and Deportes Concepción.

== International career ==
Sanzotti played for the Argentina national under-17 football team at 1991 FIFA U-17 World Championship.

== Personal life ==
His father of the same name, Raúl Celis, also was a goalkeeper.
