= Salem Bitar =

Syrian footballer (born 1973)

Personal information
- Date of birth: 7 August 1973 (age 53)
- Place of birth: Homs, Syria
- Position: Goalkeeper

Senior career*
Years	Team	Apps	(Gls)
1990–1994	Al-Karamah		
1994–1997	El-Maaden		
1997–2003	Al-Karamah		
2003–2004	Qardaha SC		

International career
1989–1991	Syria Under-20	10	(0)
1996–1999	Syria	2	(0)
- * Club domestic league appearances and goals

Salem Bitar (Arabic: سالم بيطار) is a Syrian football goalkeeper who played for the Syria in the 1996 Asian Cup.
