= Jean-Marie Gbahou =

Ivorian footballer (born 1973)

Personal information
- Date of birth: 1 April 1973 (age 53)

International career
Years	Team	Apps	(Gls)
1990–1996	Ivory Coast	14	(0)

Jean-Marie Gbahou (born 1 April 1973) is an Ivorian footballer. He played in 14 matches for the Ivory Coast national football team from 1990 to 1996. He was also named in Ivory Coast's squad for the 1994 African Cup of Nations tournament.
