= Malek Koussa =

Syrian footballer (born 1971)

Personal information
- Date of birth: 16 August 1971 (age 55)
- Place of birth: Syria
- Position: Goalkeeper

Senior career*
Years	Team	Apps	(Gls)
- Jableh

International career
- Syria U20
- Syria
- * Club domestic league appearances and goals

Malek Koussa (Arabic: مالك كوسا; born 16 August 1971) is a Syrian former footballer who played as a goalkeeper for Syria national team.
