= Roberto Mogrovejo =

Argentine footballer

Personal information
- Full name: Roberto Arturo Mogrovejo
- Date of birth: June 19, 1972 (age 54)
- Place of birth: Bahía Blanca, Argentina
- Height: 1.72 m (5 ft 8 in)
- Position: Winger

Team information
- Current team: Club Ferrocarril Urquiza

Youth career
- Chacarita Juniors

Senior career*
Years	Team	Apps	(Gls)
1989–1993	Argentinos Juniors	69	(6)
1994	FC Porto	0	(0)
1994	Deportivo Español	2	(0)
1995–1996	Tigre		
1997–1998	Defensa y Justicia		
1998–1999	Berazategui		
2000–2002	Hapoel Kfar Saba FC		
2002–2003	J.J. Urquiza		

International career
1991	Argentina U20	2	(0)
- * Club domestic league appearances and goals as of 31 July 2008

Roberto Mogrovejo (born 19 June 1972 in Buenos Aires) is a former Argentine football player that plays as a right winger. He was part of the Argentina squad in the 1991 World Youth Championship in Lisbon. He played for several Argentine teams including Argentinos Juniors and Defensa y Justicia. He also played abroad in Hapoel Kfar Saba of Israel and for Portuguese champions FC Porto for which he never made any official appearance.
