= Tó Ferreira =

Portuguese footballer (born 1971)

Personal information
- Full name: José António Alves Ferreira
- Date of birth: 24 August 1971 (age 55)
- Place of birth: Porto, Portugal
- Height: 1.83 m (6 ft 0 in)
- Position: Goalkeeper

Youth career
- 1982–1983: Águias da Areosa
- 1983–1986: Boavista
- 1987–1988: Bairro do Falcão
- 1988–1989: Pedrouços
- 1989–1990: Famalicão

Senior career*
Years	Team	Apps	(Gls)
1990–1993	Famalicão	10	(0)
1993–1994	Amora	29	(1)
1994–1996	Beira-Mar	34	(0)
1996–1999	Aves	75	(0)
1999–2001	Penafiel	48	(0)
2001–2002	Salgueiros	3	(0)
2002–2003	Naval	8	(0)
2003–2004	Chaves	33	(0)
2004–2006	Espinho	49	(0)
2006–2007	Dragões Sandinenses	26	(0)
2007–2009	Oliveirense	58	(0)
2010	Gondomar	8	(0)
2010–2011	Boavista	4	(0)
2011–2012	Paredes	17	(0)
Total		402	(1)

International career
1991	Portugal U20	4	(0)
1994	Portugal U21	3	(0)
Medal record
Men's football
Representing Portugal
FIFA U-20 World Cup
Winner	1991 Portugal
- * Club domestic league appearances and goals

José António "Tó" Alves Ferreira (born 24 August 1971) is a Portuguese former professional footballer who played as a goalkeeper.

== Club career ==
In a senior career that lasted 22 years, Porto-born Ferreira played mainly in the second and third divisions of his country.

In the Primeira Liga, his totals consisted of ten games for F.C. Famalicão over the course of two seasons, eight with S.C. Beira-Mar in 1994–95 – with relegation – and three for S.C. Salgueiros in the 2001–02 campaign, with his team also dropping down a tier.

== International career ==
Ferreira represented Portugal at the 1991 FIFA World Youth Championship, played in Lisbon. He appeared in the third group-stage match for the eventual winners, keeping a clean sheet against South Korea (1–0 win).
