= Marcelo Pontiroli =

Argentine footballer

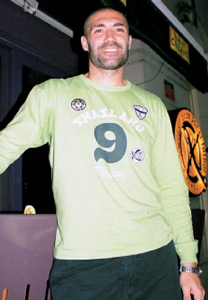

Personal information
- Full name: Marcelo Luis Pontiroli
- Date of birth: January 22, 1972 (age 54)
- Place of birth: San Andrés de Giles, Argentina
- Height: 1.90 m (6 ft 3 in)
- Position: Goalkeeper

Senior career*
Years	Team	Apps	(Gls)
1993–1997	Deportivo Español	22	(0)
1997–1999	Argentinos Juniors	76	(0)
1999–2000	Independiente	20	(0)
2000–2001	Belgrano Córdoba	34	(0)
2001–2002	Lanús	35	(0)
2002–2003	Varzim	21	(0)
2003	Belgrano Córdoba	16	(0)
2003–2005	Quilmes	74	(0)
2005–2007	Argentinos Juniors	73	(0)
2007–2010	Quilmes	39	(0)
2010–2011	Deportivo Merlo	6	(0)
- * Club domestic league appearances and goals

Marcelo Luis Pontiroli (born 22 January 1972 in San Andrés de Giles, Buenos Aires) is a former Argentine footballer who played as a goalkeeper.

== Football career ==
Pontiroli began his career in 1993 at Deportivo Español, moving to Argentinos Juniors in 1997, and Club Atlético Independiente two years later. Between 2000 and 2007, he represented Belgrano de Córdoba, Club Atlético Lanús and Quilmes Atlético Club, with his first and only abroad experience in between, with only six Primeira Liga games for Varzim S.C. in a relegation-ending season.

In 2007, after 310 Primera División games, 35-year-old Pontiroli returned to Quilmes and helped El Cervecero promote to the top flight in 2009–10. He chose, however, to continue in Primera B Nacional, signing with Deportivo Merlo.
