= Glenn Benjamin =

Trinidad and Tobago footballer

Personal information
- Date of birth: April 4, 1972 (age 54)
- Place of birth: Gasparillo, Trinidad and Tobago
- Height: 5 ft 9 in (1.75 m)
- Positions: Forward; midfielder

Youth career
- 1993–1996: University of Mobile

Senior career*
Years	Team	Apps	(Gls)
1997–1998	New Orleans Riverboat Gamblers	52	(8)
2001	Charleston Battery	1	(0)
2002	Hampton Roads Mariners	3	(0)
2003–2004	New Orleans Shell Shockers	27	(2)

International career
- Trinidad and Tobago U-20
- Trinidad and Tobago
- * Club domestic league appearances and goals

Glenn Benjamin (born April 4, 1972) is a retired Trinidad and Tobago association football player who was a member of the Trinidad and Tobago U-20 national team at the 1991 FIFA World Youth Championship.

== Club ==
Benjamin graduated from Saint Benedict's College, a secondary school in Trinidad. He attended the University of Mobile, playing on the men’s soccer team from 1993 to 1996. In 1994, Benjamin and his teammates finished runner-up in the final of the NAIA national men's soccer championship. In 1996, he was selected as an NAIA All American. In April 1997, Benjamin signed with the New Orleans Riverboat Gamblers of the USISL A-League. In early 2000, Benjamin joined the Tennessee Rhythm, but was released in May. In February 2001, the Charleston Battery signed Benjamin, but he played only one game before being released. In 2002, he briefly played for the Hampton Roads Mariners. He finished his career with the New Orleans Shell Shockers of the USL Premier Development League.

== International ==
Benjamin played for the Trinidad and Tobago national teams at both the youth and senior levels. He was a member of the Trinidad and Tobago U-20 national team at the 1991 FIFA World Youth Championship.
