= Stefan Paldan =

Swedish footballer

Personal information
- Full name: Stefan Mogens Paldan
- Date of birth: 27 October 1971 (age 55)
- Place of birth: Sweden
- Position: Midfielder

Senior career*
Years	Team	Apps	(Gls)
1990–1996	Östers IF		
1997–2000	Brann	62	(2)
2000–2002	Öster		

International career
1991	Sweden U19	5	(1)
1992–1993	Sweden U21	13	(1)
- * Club domestic league appearances and goals

Stefan Mogens Paldan (born 27 October 1971) is a Swedish former professional footballer who played as a midfielder. He was a squad member for Sweden at the 1991 FIFA World Youth Championship and the 1992 UEFA European Under-21 Championship.
