= Patrick Luxenburg =

Swedish footballer (born 1972)

Patrik Luxenburg
Personal information
- Date of birth: 7 July 1972 (age 54)
- Height: 1.79 m (5 ft 10 in)
- Position: Midfielder

Senior career*
Years	Team	Apps	(Gls)
1990–1991	Djurgårdens IF	1	(0)
1992–1994	Spånga IS		
1995–2002	FC Café Opera		
2003–2004	Spånga IS		
- * Club domestic league appearances and goals

Patrik Anders Luxenburg (born 7 July 1972) is a Swedish former footballer. He made one Allsvenskan appearance for Djurgårdens IF.

== Career ==
=== Club ===
In September 1990, Luxenburg made his Allsvenskan debut for Djurgårdens IF in a substitution in the 94th minute. Four seconds later, the referee ended the match and Luxenburg's Allsvenskan career ended with four seconds. He later played in Superettan for FC Café Opera.

=== International ===
Luxenburg was in the squad for 1991 FIFA World Youth Championship, but didn't make any appearances.
