= Andrey Shkurin =

Kazakhstani-Russian footballer

Personal information
- Full name: Andrey Nikolayevich Shkurin
- Date of birth: 3 March 1972 (age 54)
- Place of birth: Moscow, Russian SFSR
- Height: 1.72 m (5 ft 7 1/2 in)
- Position: Defender

Youth career
- FShM Moscow
- SDYuShOR-2 Lyublinskogo RONO Moscow

Senior career*
Years	Team	Apps	(Gls)
1990	FC Zvezda Moscow	0	(0)
1990–1992	FC Dynamo Moscow	1	(0)
1991	→ FC Dynamo-2 Moscow (loan)	2	(0)
1992	→ FC Dynamo-d Moscow (loan)	9	(2)
1992–1999	FC Chernomorets Novorossiysk	221	(3)
2000	FC Shinnik Yaroslavl	4	(0)
2000	FC Nosta Novotroitsk	17	(0)
2001	FC Kuban Krasnodar	10	(0)
2002–2005	FC Tobol	111	(2)
2006–2007	FC Aktobe	39	(0)

International career
2003–2004	Kazakhstan	3	(0)
- * Club domestic league appearances and goals

Andrey Nikolayevich Shkurin (Russian: Андрей Николаевич Шкурин; born 3 March 1972 in Moscow) is a former Kazakhstani Russian-born football player.

== Honours ==
Tobol

- Kazakhstan Premier League runner-up: 2003, 2005
- Kazakhstan Premier League bronze: 2002, 2004
- Kazakhstan Cup runner-up: 2003

Aktobe

- Kazakhstan Premier League champion: 2007
- Kazakhstan Premier League runner-up: 2006
