= Argentinos Juniors =

Sports club in Argentina

- Full name: Asociación Atlética Argentinos Juniors
- Nicknames: El Bicho (The Bug); El Semillero del Mundo (World's Seedbed); El Tifón de Boyacá (The Boyacá Typhoon)
- Founded: 15 August 1904; 122 years ago
- Ground: Estadio Diego Armando Maradona
- Capacity: 26,000
- Chairman: Cristian Malaspina
- Manager: Nicolás Diez
- League: Liga Profesional de Fútbol
- 2025: 3rd of 30
- Website: argentinosjuniors.com.ar
Home colours	Away colours	Third colours

Asociación Atlética Argentinos Juniors is an Argentine sports club based in La Paternal, Buenos Aires. The club is mostly known for its football team, which currently plays in the Argentine Primera División, and was recognized as one of the most important football teams of South America by FIFA. It is one of the eight Argentine first division teams that have won the Copa Libertadores. The continental trophy was won in the club's first entry to the contest, in 1985.

The club also has the nickname "El Semillero del Mundo" (The World's Seedbed) and is renowned for producing talented players through their youth system. The most notable example would be Diego Maradona, who played for the club between 1976 and 1981. Their stadium, "Estadio Diego Armando Maradona" is named after him. Other notable players who started their career at the club include Juan Román Riquelme, Claudio Borghi, Sergio Batista, Fernando Redondo, Esteban Cambiasso, and Alexis Mac Allister.

== History ==
=== Early years ===
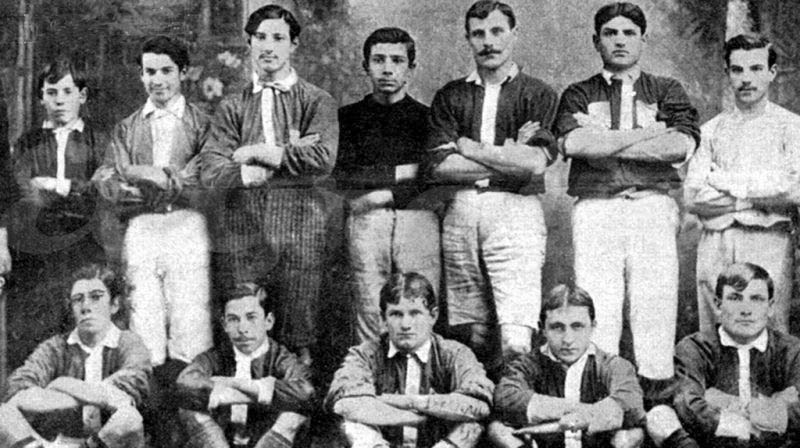
Team of Argentinos Juniors in 1907

The club was founded in the Villa Crespo neighbourhood of Buenos Aires on 14 August 1904, by a group of anarchist boys that were part of club "Mártires de Chicago" (chosen in homage to the eight anarchists imprisoned or hanged after the 1886 Haymarket Riot in Chicago). Leandro Ravera Bianchi was named president of the recently created club.

The club immediately adopted the red and white colors as an homage to deputy Alfredo Palacios, the first congressman elected from the Socialist Party in Argentina. The club affiliated itself with the Liga Central de Football, a minor league in which small clubs and companies took part. The first match played by Argentinos Juniors was against Club La Prensa, which Argentinos Juniors lost by a catastrophic scoreline of 12–1. Nevertheless, the squad would be crowned champion at the end of the season. Argentinos Juniors played its home matches in the field located on Gaona Avenue and Añasco Street.

After the club was evicted, Argentinos Juniors played at several fields, first renting one in Villa Ballester, returning to their neighborhood of origin in 1907. After a brief stint in Villa Urquiza, the club returned to Caballito, later moving to Fraga and Estomba streets in Villa Ortúzar. In 1909, Argentinos gained affiliation with the Argentine Football Association, but in 1912 the club was involved in the first schism in Argentine football when Argentinos joined the breakaway "Federación Argentina de Football" (FAF). During those years, the club re-adopted its green and white colors as there were teams in the league using red jerseys.

In 1920, the Argentinos Juniors played a promotion play-off with El Porvenir, which saw El Porvenir prevail 3–2 on aggregate. In 1921, the team secured promotion to the Argentine top division, making its debut in the 1922 season, where Argentinos finished 6th.

In 1925, the Argentinos Juniors moved to its current location in La Paternal neighborhood, acquiring land at San Martín Avenue and Punta Arenas Street and building a stadium with a capacity of 10,000. With the new stadium finished, Argentinos Juniors was runner-up in 1926 behind champions Boca Juniors. The club had also increased its membership to 1,000.

In 1927, the two separate football associations were reunified and Argentinos played in a massive 34 team league. Later, the league was expanded to 36 and Argentinos managed to keep its place until 1930.

=== 1931–1966 ===
In 1931 Argentinos joined 17 other clubs in forming a breakaway professional league, a move that marked the beginning of the professional era of Argentine football. In 1934 the amateur league was broken up and Argentina once again had a unified first division. As part of this move, Argentinos Juniors were unified with Club Atlético Atlanta, the season progressed badly, and after 25 rounds the union was dissolved due to financial irregularities in the Atlanta books. Argentinos Juniors played on but finished bottom of the league with only 2 wins from 39 games.

Argentinos was allowed to keep its place in the Primera, but succumbed to relegation in 1937 after finishing second from bottom of the table.

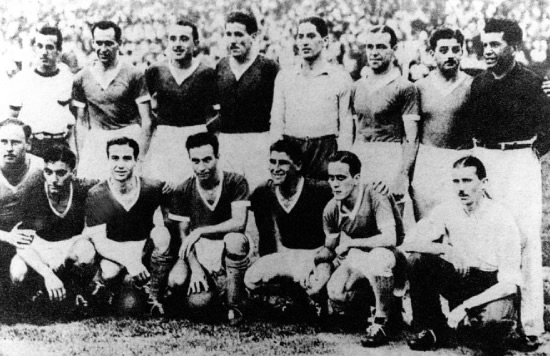
The team that won the Primera B championship in 1940.

In 1940 Argentinos enjoyed a good campaign in a new stadium, which ended up in winning the 2nd division, but the club was not allowed promotion because their ground did not meet the requirements of the Primera División, and AFA would not make an exception for Argentinos to play at another ground, even though they had done so for several other promoted clubs in previous seasons.

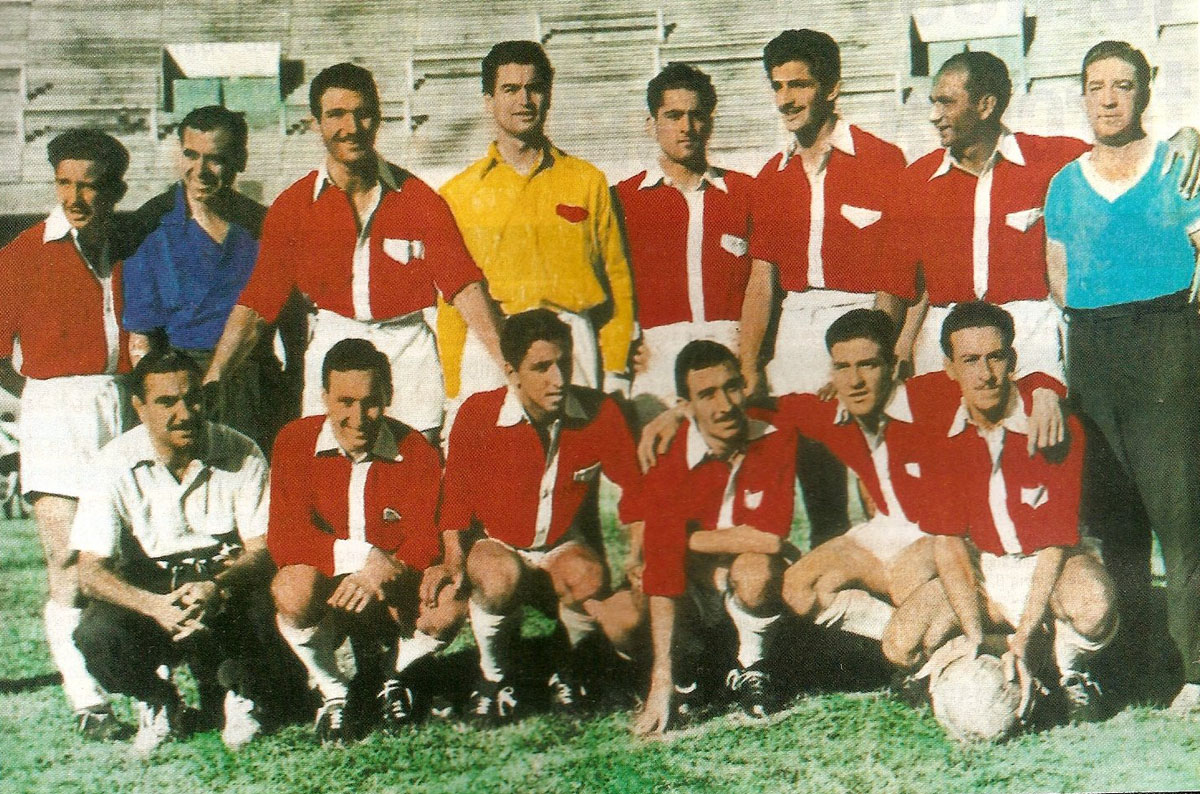
The Argentinos Juniors team that in 1955 won the championship promoting to Primera División.

In 1943 Hector Ingunza started playing for the club, and went on to become the top scorer in the club's history with 143 goals in official games between 1943 and 1946.

In 1948 Argentinos suffered another injustice at the hands of the AFA. They had qualified to the end of season playoff for promotion to the Primera and were top of the league after 7 of the 11 rounds when a players strike interrupted the competition. AFA eventually abandoned the playoff and gave automatic promotion to the teams that had been relegated in 1946 and 1947 instead.

In 1954 Argentinos finished 2nd in the league having scored 88 goals, making it the highest scoring team by far. In 1955 the team finally secured promotion back to the Primera after 18 long years. Argentinos returned to top flight competition in 1956 and after finishing near the bottom of the table that year, the team secured comfortable mid-table finishes over the next few seasons.

In 1960 there was a complete overhaul of the Argentinos Juniors team. The new team performed well and it was only in the last game of the season that they missed out on the championship. Argentinos finished in 3rd place, only 2 points below the eventual champions Independiente. Although the team didn't win the championship, it is fondly remembered by those old enough to have seen them play. In the following years the team did not live up to expectations, rarely finishing in the top half of the table.

=== 1967–1984 ===
1967 saw the introduction of the Metropolitano and Nacional system, Argentinos struggled to adapt and only just survived relegation from the Metropolitano in the inaugural season. Over the next few seasons Argentinos had to play in several short tournaments to earn the right to stay in the Metropolitano and were far from qualifying to play in the Nacional.

From 1971 Argentinos stabilized themselves and avoided the lower positions in the table, they also qualified to play in the expanded Nacional tournaments of the early '70s, they performed well enough, but failed to qualify for the final stages. In 1975 Argentinos Juniors finished 19th of 20 teams, but were fortunate in that no teams were relegated from the Metropolitano that season.

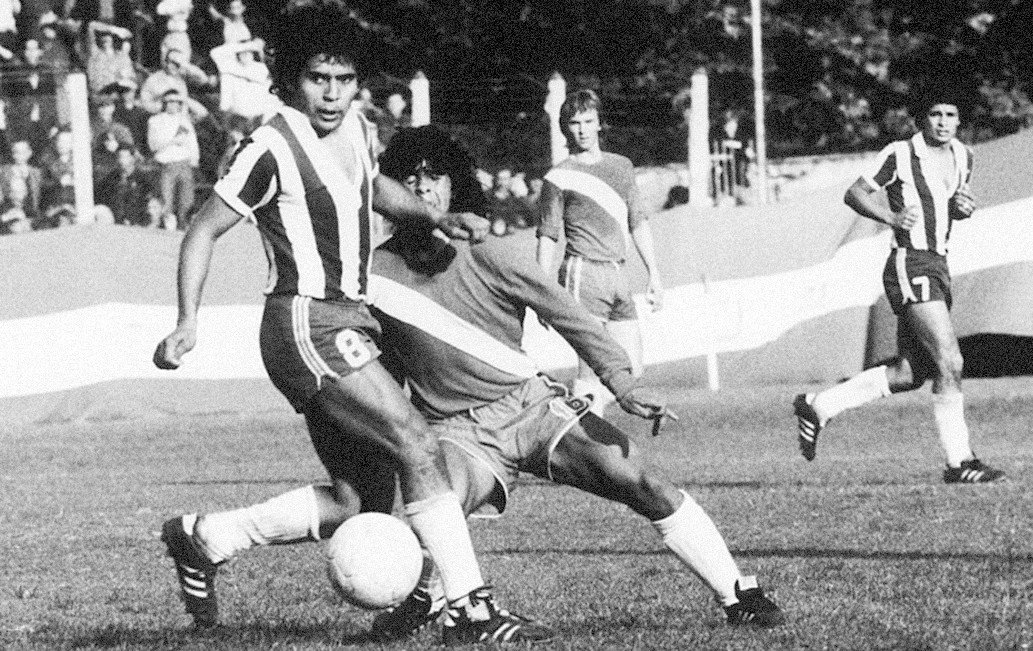
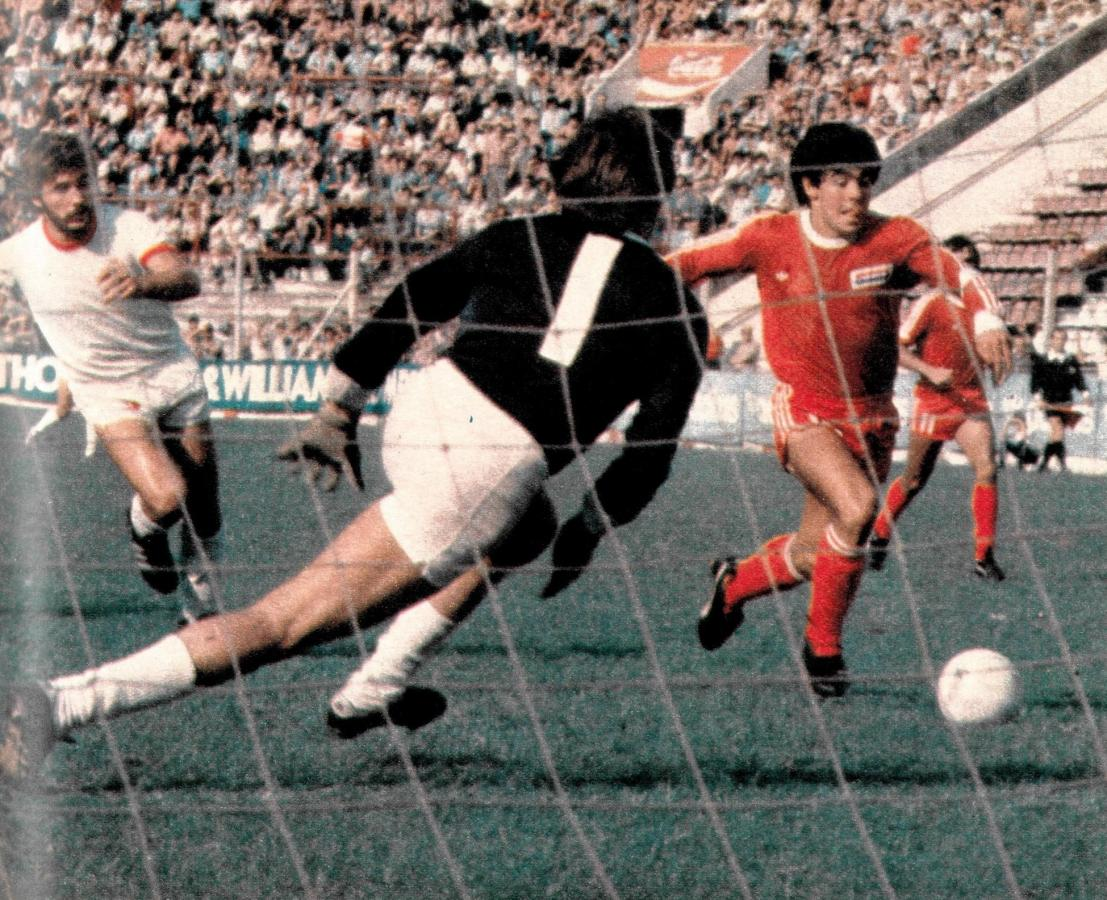
Two images of Diego Maradona with Argentinos: the day of his debut v Talleres de Córdoba, 1976; and in a match vs. Huracán, 1980

On Thursday 20 October 1976, fans of Argentinos Juniors and a few traveling Talleres de Córdoba fans witnessed probably the most important debut in the history of Argentine football. With Argentinos losing 1–0 the manager, Juan Carlos Montes sent on a fifteen-year-old debutant named Diego Armando Maradona making him the league's youngest ever player until his record was broken by Sergio Agüero in 2003. Argentinos lost the game but Diego went on to propel the club forward over the next four years and to achieve great successes with other clubs and the Argentina national team. In the 1979 Metropolitano Diego became the youngest topscorer in the history of Argentine football with 14 goals, he went on to become top scorer in the following three tournaments, matching José Sanfilippo's record of being Argentina's topscorer on four consecutive occasions. In 1980 Argentinos finished 2nd in the Metropolitano and reached the quarter finals of the Nacional. The 2nd-place finish was their best since the beginning of the professional era in 1931.

Maradona was sold to Boca Juniors in 1981 for a fee of £1 million. Maradona never won a title with Argentinos but his massive transfer fee allowed Argentinos to strengthen their squad for the years ahead, although his departure almost cost Argentinos their place in the top flight as they needed a last day win over San Lorenzo to avoid relegation at San Lorenzo's expense.

In 1982 Argentinos failed to progress to the latter stages of the Nacional and finished in mid table in the Metropolitano. The season of 1983 saw a distinct improvement under the leadership of Ángel Labruna, he had brought in a new group of players a new system of play and moved them to the Estadio Ricardo Etcheverry of Ferro Carril Oeste to give the team a wider pitch to play on. The team were making good progress, they had made it to the semi-finals of the Nacional and were in the middle of the Metropolitano when Labruna died suddenly on 20 September 1983, the team held themselves together under new manager Roberto Saporiti for a mid table finish. They then made it to the quarter-finals of the Nacional in 1984.

=== 1984–1985: First titles and Copa Libertadores ===
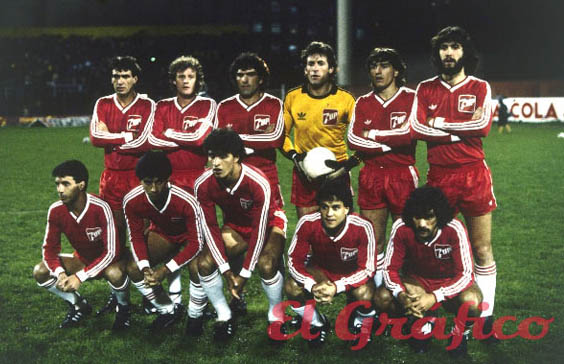
The team that won its first (and only to date) Copa Libertadores in 1985

Saporiti had kept faith with Labruna's attacking style of play, and largely retained the same group of players. Argentinos managed to win the title by a single point over Ferro Carril Oeste on the last day of the season. This was the first major title in the club's history and gave them automatic qualification to the Copa Libertadores in 1985.

Saporiti was replaced as manager by José Yudica who had worked wonders in previous seasons including leading unfashionable Quilmes Atlético Club to the Metropolitano championship in 1978 and rescuing San Lorenzo from the 2nd division at the first time of asking. The Nacional championship of 1985 was the last, and featured by far the most complicated structure in the history of the Argentine Primera. Once the competition reached the knockout stage, the eliminated teams got another chance to play on in the losers knockout. Argentinos won the winners group with a 4–2 penalties win against Vélez Sársfield after a 2–2 aggregate score, but Velez got another chance to play for the title after beating River Plate in the losers final. Argentinos and Velez played for the title and after a 1–1 draw, Velez won the penalty shootout, but because they had come from the losers group a new game was needed, which Argentinos won 2–1.

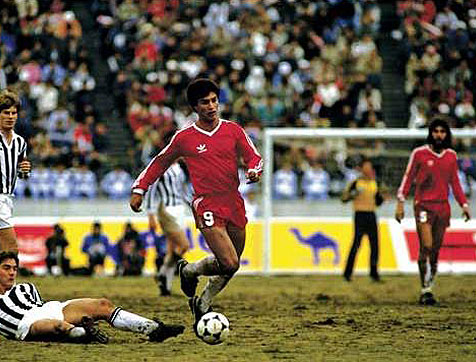
Claudio Borghi dribbling during the 1985 Intercontinental Cup vs. Juventus

The 1985 edition of the Copa Libertadores saw the inclusion of three Argentine teams, Independiente as the previous years champions, Ferro Carril Oeste as the champions of the 1984 Nacional and Argentinos Juniors as the champions of the 1984 Metropolitano.

In the first round Argentinos and Ferro were put into the same group with Brazilian teams Fluminense and Vasco da Gama. The group was dominated by the two Argentine teams, who finished level on points at the top of the group. This necessitated a playoff game to determine which team would progress to the semi-final, which Argentinos won 3–1.

In the semi-final round Argentinos found themselves in a group of three with Independiete who had received a bye to the semi-finals and club Blooming of Bolivia. Argentinos progressed thanks to a 2–1 win in Independiente's stadium in the last fixture of the group.

The final was against América de Cali of Colombia, after a 1–0 home win each, the final went to a deciding game in Asunción, Paraguay. The game finished 1–1 and Argentinos won 5–4 on penalties. It was only the second time the competition had been decided on penalties, and marked the finest achievement in the history of Argentinos Juniors.

The usual line-up was: Enrique Vidallé, Carmelo Villalba, José Luis Pavoni, Jorge Olguín, Adrián Domenech, Emilio Commisso, Sergio Batista, Mario Videla, "Pepe" Castro, Claudio Borghi, Carlos Ereros. The team was coached by José Yudica.

=== Decline ===
In 1985 Argentinos Juniors represented South America in the Intercontinental Cup against Juventus FC of Italy, the game ended in a 2–2 draw, but Argentinos lost in the penalty shootout. Argentinos went on to win another trophy in 1986. They won 1–0 in the Copa Interamericana against Defence Force of Trinidad and Tobago.

Argentinos qualified for the 1986 Copa Libertadores, receiving a bye to the second round as holders, but was eliminated in the group of three, behind River Plate of Argentina who went on to win the tournament.

1985–1986 saw the start of European-style seasons. Argentinos performed well, finishing in the top half of the table for most of the rest of the 1980s and never fearing relegation, although Argentinos also never really challenged as title contender. By 1988 the majority of the Libertadores champions had gone and Argentinos were a vastly different team.

On 20 November 1988 the club set a world record for the longest penalty shootout, which occurred in a league match against Racing Club, the shootout finished 20–19 to Argentinos after 44 penalties were taken. The rules of the time granted an extra point for the winner on penalties after a drawn match.

1990 saw the introduction of the Apertura and Clausura system in Argentina, Argentinos enjoyed a number of decent finishes, although the team finished 19th in Apertura 1992 and was saved from relegation by the points averaging system.

=== Relegation and return to Primera ===
Argentinos finished 20th and last in 1995 Clausura and was again saved by the points averaging system, the next year squad finished bottom of the Clausura and was relegated from the Primera División only eleven years after being champions of South America.

In the 1996–1997 season Argentinos won the second division under manager Osvaldo Sosa to bounce back into the Primera at the first attempt. The team remained in the top flight until it was relegated again after another sequence of poor finishes. The best finish Argentinos managed in that period was 4th in the 2001 Clausura.

Argentinos spent two seasons in the 2nd division before returning in 2004 through a playoff with Talleres de Córdoba who had finished the season in 3rd place in the Primera, but had to play in the relegation playoff due to effect of their poor form in the previous 2 seasons on their standings in the points averaging table.

Argentinos spent a couple of nervous seasons narrowly avoiding relegation in 2005 by beating Atlético de Rafaela in a playoff. The following season it survived a playoff against Huracán. The 2006–2007 season saw Argentinos finally claw its way clear from the relegation places after over two years of flirting with relegation.

In 2008 Argentinos earned the right to play in an international tournament for the first time in 12 years by qualifying for the 2008 Copa Sudamericana. The team eventually progressed to the semi-final where it was eliminated by Estudiantes de La Plata over two legs despite beating them 5–0 in the league game which was sandwiched between the cup ties.

In June 2009, former star player Claudio Borghi took over as manager of the club following a poor performance in the 2009 Clausura tournament where the club had finished 20th and last in the table with only 2 wins from their 19 games.

At the beginning of the 2010 Clausura championship, the team recorded an impressive 6–3 win against Lanús in its second fixture of the campaign, but after 5 games this would be its only victory, with two draws and two defeats. Argentinos won its 6th fixture against Estudiantes de La Plata which was the start of a 14-game unbeaten streak that saw Argentinos finish 1-point ahead of Estudiantes at the end of the season. The most significant result in this 14-game run was in the penultimate fixture against title challengers Independiente, which saw Argentinos come back from 1–3 down to win 4–3, which featured two goals in the final minutes of the game to seal the win and leave Argentinos at the top of the table with one game to play. Argentinos finally won its first domestic championship in 25 years with a 1–2 away win against Huracán in the Estadio Tomás Adolfo Ducó.

After the 2010 Clausura, Borghi stepped down as coach and was replaced by Pedro Troglio. The 2010 Apertura was a poor tournament overall, finishing 13th in the table. With the 2010 Clausura title, Argentinos qualified directly to the 2011 Copa Libertadores group stage. Their first game was a 2-2 draw against Fluminense in Rio de Janeiro. After winning two additional matches, the team went on to lose their next three. The final game, a 2–4 home defeat to Fluminense that sealed their elimination, was marred by an infamous brawl at the end. However, the team had a good campaign in the 2011 Apertura, finishing 5th and qualifying to the 2011 Copa Sudamericana.

The teams results started to worsen in the 2012 Apertura, with the team finishing 16th with 19 points. The 2013 Torneo Final was worse, with the team finishing 18th of 20. In the following tournament, the 2013 Torneo Inicial, things improved, with the team finishing 13th. Things did not improve in the 2014 Torneo Final, with the team finishing 19th and being relegated to the Primera B Nacional in April 2014.

== Kit uniform evolution ==
Although the red color has been historically identified with Argentinos Juniors, the first jersey was green with white vertical stripes. Some sources state that this jersey was worn during the first years of the team because the Argentine Football Association did not allow Argentinos Juniors to register a red uniform due to it having been previously adopted by Club Atlético Independiente.

1904–17	1917–present (Note: Argentinos Juniors adopted their definitive red color, inspired by the club's socialist beginnings.)

== Players ==
=== Current squad ===
As of 13 October 2026

Note: Flags indicate national team as defined under FIFA eligibility rules; some limited exceptions apply. Players may hold more than one non-FIFA nationality.

No.	Pos.	Nation	Player
1	GK	ARG	Agustín Mangiaut
3	DF	ARG	Luciano Sánchez
4	DF	ARG	Érik Godoy
5	MF	ARG	Facundo Carrizo
6	DF	ARG	Franco Vázquez
7	FW	ARG	Diego Porcel
8	MF	ARG	Hernán López Muñoz
9	FW	ARG	Gastón Verón
10	MF	ARG	Gabriel Florentín
11	MF	ARG	Nicolás Oroz (captain)
12	GK	ARG	Gonzalo Siri
13	DF	ARG	Santino Gianini
14	DF	ARG	Kevin Coronel
15	MF	ARG	Facundo Gutiérrez
16	DF	ARG	Francisco Álvarez
17	DF	ARG	Franco Paredes (on loan from Independiente)

No.	Pos.	Nation	Player
18	MF	ARG	Federico Mancuello
19	FW	ARG	Matías Giménez
20	DF	ARG	Sebastián Prieto
23	DF	ARG	Mateo Mendoza (on loan from Godoy Cruz)
25	GK	CHI	Brayan Cortés (on loan from Colo-Colo)
26	DF	ARG	Claudio Bravo
27	FW	ARG	Tomás Molina
28	MF	ARG	Joaquín Gho
29	FW	ARG	Emiliano Viveros
30	DF	PAR	Alan Núñez (on loan from Cerro Porteño)
32	MF	ARG	Gino Infantino (on loan from Fiorentina)
35	FW	ARG	Alan Alcaraz
36	MF	ARG	Gastón Bouhier
41	DF	ARG	Santiago Silveira
48	FW	ARG	Facundo Jainikoski
49	FW	JPN	Ryōga Kida (on loan from Nagoya Grampus)

=== Other players under contract ===
Note: Flags indicate national team as defined under FIFA eligibility rules; some limited exceptions apply. Players may hold more than one non-FIFA nationality.

No.	Pos.	Nation	Player
17	MF	ARG	Cristian Ferreira

=== Reserve squad ===
Note: Flags indicate national team as defined under FIFA eligibility rules; some limited exceptions apply. Players may hold more than one non-FIFA nationality.

No.	Pos.	Nation	Player
35	GK	ARG	Valentín Catalán
38	FW	ARG	Rodrigo Fernández

==== Out on loan ====
Note: Flags indicate national team as defined under FIFA eligibility rules; some limited exceptions apply. Players may hold more than one non-FIFA nationality.

No.	Pos.	Nation	Player
5	MF	PAR	Juan Cardozo (to Central Córdoba until 31 December 2026)
7	FW	ARG	Lautaro Giaccone (to Columbus Crew until 30 June 2027)
8	MF	ARG	Lucas Gómez (to Newell's Old Boys until 31 December 2027)
14	DF	ARG	Leonel Mosevich (to Instituto until 31 December 2026)
19	FW	ARG	Juan Román Pucheta (to Atlético Guayaquil until 31 December 2026)
19	DF	ARG	Luciano Gómez (to Independiente Rivadavia until 31 December 2026)
30	FW	CHI	Iván Morales (to Independiente until 30 June 2027)
31	DF	ARG	Manuel Guillén (to Tristán Suárez until 31 December 2026)
33	FW	ARG	Manuel Brondo (to Atlético Tucumán until 31 December 2026)
35	GK	ARG	Leandro Finochietto (to Güemes until 31 December 2026)
37	MF	ARG	Matías Lugo (to Barcelona SC until 31 December 2026)
39	MF	ARG	Yair González (to Boston River until 31 December 2026)
40	DF	URU	Mateo Antoni (to Alianza Lima until 31 December 2026)

No.	Pos.	Nation	Player
41	FW	ARG	Lautaro Ovando (to San Martín de Tucumán until 31 December 2026)
42	DF	ARG	Juan Manuel Cabrera (to Sarmiento (Junín) until 31 December 2026)
43	DF	ARG	Jonatan Galván (to Instituto until 31 December 2026)
44	DF	ARG	Pablo Minissale (to Mitre until 31 December 2026)
45	DF	ARG	Thiago Santamaría (to Sarmiento (Junín) until 31 December 2026)
46	DF	ARG	Nicolás Tolosa (to Almagro until 31 December 2026)
48	MF	ARG	Leonardo Heredia (to Platense until 31 December 2026)
49	FW	ARG	Lucas Ambrogio (to Nueva Chicago until 31 December 2026)
51	FW	URU	Joaquín Ardáiz (to Sarmiento (Junín) until 31 December 2026)
52	FW	ARG	Santiago Rodríguez (to Gimnasia-M until 31 December 2026)
53	FW	ARG	Maximiliano Romero (to Colo-Colo until 31 December 2026)
99	FW	ARG	Damián Batallini (to Bolívar until 31 December 2026)

=== Notable players ===
To appear in this section a player must have played at least 50 games for the club or set a club record. Players in bold are still active.

- (Argentina) Óscar Di Stéfano (1921–59)
- (Argentina) Héctor Ingunza (1943–46)
- (Argentina) Héctor Pederzoli (1953–59)
- (Argentina) Orlando Nappe (1956–59)
- (Argentina) Osvaldo "Chiche" Sosa (1966–68, 1970–71)
- (Argentina) José Pekerman (1970–74)
- (Argentina) Carlos Fren (1973–78)
- (Argentina) Carlos Barone (1974–76)
- (Argentina) Óscar Quintabani (1974–76)
- (Argentina) Ricardo Giusti (1979 –80)
- (Argentina) Quique Wolff (1979 –81)
- (Argentina) Diego Maradona (1976–81)
- (Argentina) Pedro Pasculli (1980–85)
- (Argentina) Sergio Batista (1981–88, 1991)
- (Argentina) Claudio "Bichi" Borghi (1981–86)
- (Argentina) Adrián Domenech (1982–87)
- (Argentina) Mario Videla (1982–87)
- (Argentina) Carmelo Villalba (1982–88)
- (Argentina) Carlos Ereros (1982–89)
- (Panama) Armando Dely Valdés† (1983–88)
- (Argentina) Ubaldo Fillol (1983–84)
- (United States) Renato Corsi (1983–87)
- (Argentina) José Antonio Castro (1983–87)
- (Argentina) Ángel Landucci (1983)
- (Argentina) José Luis Pavoni (1983–88)
- (Argentina) Juan José López (1984–86)
- (Argentina) Carlos Morete (1984–86)
- (Argentina) Jorge Pellegrini (1984–87)
- (Argentina) Enrique Vidallé (1984–87)
- (Argentina) Emilio Commisso (1984–88)
- (Argentina) Jorge Olguín (1984–88)
- (Argentina) Néstor Lorenzo (1985–89)
- (Argentina) Fernando Redondo (1985–90)
- (Argentina) Fernando Cáceres (1986–91, 2006–07)
- (Argentina) Carlos Mac Allister (1986–92)
- (Argentina) Julio Olarticoechea (1987–88)
- (Argentina) Oscar Dertycia (1988–89)
- (Bolivia) Ramiro Castillo (1988–90)
- (Argentina) Fernando Cáceres (1988–92, 2006–07)
- (Argentina) Diego Cagna (1988–92)
- (Argentina) Roberto Mogrovejo (1989–93)
- (Argentina) Leonel Gancedo (1990–96)
- (Argentina) Cristian Traverso (1991–94)
- (Argentina) Juan Gomez (1991–95)
- (Argentina) Christian Dollberg (1992–94)
- (Colombia) Faryd Mondragón (1993–94)
- (Argentina) Leonardo Mas (1993–97)
- (Argentina) Jorge Quinteros (1993–97, 1998–99, 2003–04, 2006)
- (Argentina) Juan Pablo Sorín (1994–95)
- (Uruguay) Líber Vespa (1994–98)
- (Honduras) Eduardo Bennet (1995–99, 2000)
- (Argentina) Raul Sanzotti (1995–03)
- (Argentina) Diego Placente (1995–97, 2012–2013)
- (Argentina) Esteban Cambiasso (1995–96)
- (Argentina) Rolando Schiavi (1996–01)
- (Argentina) Fabián Garfagnoli (1996–02)
- (Paraguay) Hugo Brizuela (1997–99)
- (Argentina) Marcelo Pontiroli (1997–99, 2005–07)
- (Argentina) Cristian Ledesma (1997–99, 2006, 2014–2016)
- (Argentina) Federico Insúa (1997–02, 2016)
- (Argentina) Mariano Herrón (1998–02)
- (Argentina) Fernando Zagharián (1998–02)
- (Argentina) Facundo Pérez Castro (1999–07)
- (Argentina) Pablo De Muner (2000–07)
- (Argentina) Ariel Seltzer (2000–08)
- (Argentina) Pablo Barzola (2001–03, 2006–08, 2011–2014)
- (Argentina) **Gastón Machín** (2002–05, 2016-)
- (Argentina) Leonardo Pisculichi (2002–05, 2014)
- (Argentina) Leandro Fleitas (2003–06, 2007–08)
- (Paraguay) Lucas Barrios (2003–04)
- (Argentina) Nicolás Pareja (2004–06)
- (Argentina) Lucas Biglia (2004–05)
- (Argentina) Julio Barroso (2004–05)
- (Argentina) Franco Niell (2004–07, 2010–11)
- (Argentina) Nicolás Navarro (2004–07, 2010–11)
- (Paraguay) Néstor Ortigoza (2004–11)
- (Argentina) Gustavo Oberman (2004–05, 2006–07, 2009–12)
- (Argentina) Juan Manuel Martínez (2005–06)
- (Argentina) Leonel Núñez (2005–07, 2012–13)
- (Argentina) Matías Caruzzo (2006–10, 2014)
- (Argentina) Gabriel Hauche (2006–10)
- (Uruguay) Álvaro Pereira (2007–08)
- (Uruguay) Andrés Scotti (2007–09)
- (Argentina) Juan Mercier (2007–11)
- (Argentina) Gonzalo Prósperi (2006–12)
- (Argentina) Juan Sabia (2007–12, 2014)
- (Argentina) Sergio Escudero (2007–08, 2010–12)
- (Argentina) Gabriel Peñalba (2007–09, 2012)
- (Argentina) Nicolas Pavlovich (2008–10)
- (Argentina) Andrés Romero (2008–12)
- (Chile) Nicolás Peric (2009–10)
- (Argentina) Facundo Coria (2009–10, 2013–2014)
- (Argentina) Ismael Sosa (2009–10)
- (Argentina) Santiago Raymonda (2009–10)
- (Argentina) Federico Dominguez (2009–11)
- (Argentina) German Basualdo (2009–12, 2014)
- (Argentina) Ciro Rius (2009–12, 2013, 2014)
- (Argentina) José Luis Calderón (2010)
- (Argentina) Santiago Gentiletti (2010–11)
- (Chile) Emilio Hernandez (2010–12)
- (Argentina) Matias Laba (2010–13)
- (Argentina) Luis Ojeda (2010–2015)
- (Argentina) **Miguel Torren** (2010–)
- (Paraguay) Santiago Salcedo (2011)
- (Argentina) Juan Ramirez (2011–2014)
- (Argentina) Lucas Rodriguez (2011–2016)
- (Chile) Pablo Hernandez (2011–13)
- (Argentina) **Nicolás Freire** (2012-)
- (Argentina) Gaspar Iñiguez (2012–2015)
- (Colombia) Reinaldo Lenis (2013-2015)
- (Argentina) Juan Román Riquelme (2014)
- (Argentina) Luciano Cabral (2014-2016)
- (Argentina) Nicolás González (footballer, born 1998) (2016-2018)
- (Argentina) Alexis Mac Allister (2016-2019)

=== Top goalscorers ===
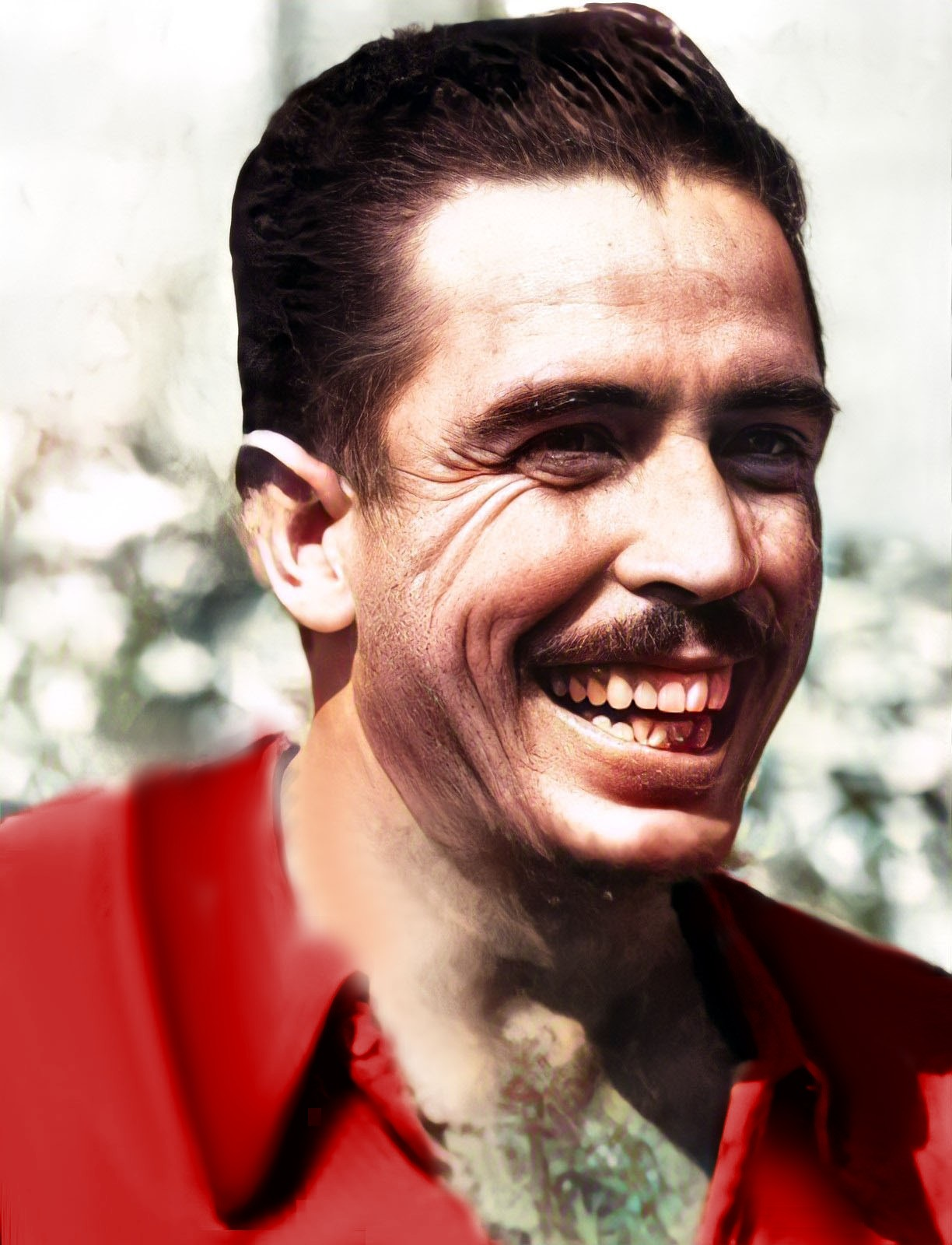
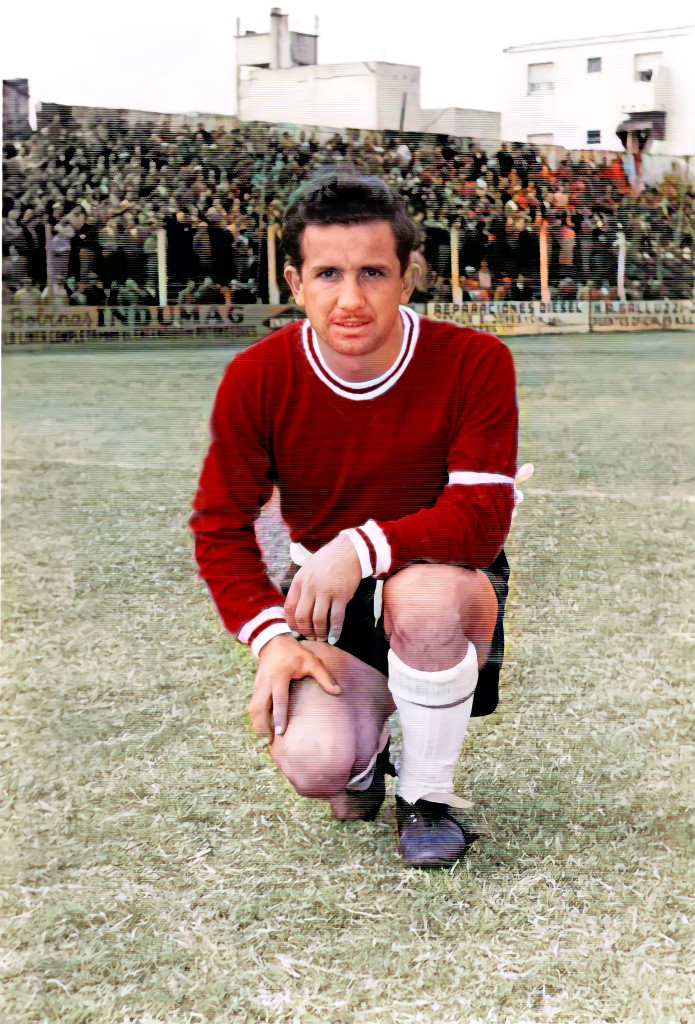
(Left): Héctor Ingunza, all-time topscorer; (right): Oscar Di Stéfano, most capped player

Rank.	Player	Tenure	Goals
1	(Argentina) **Héctor Ingunza**	1943–46, 1954	142
2	(Argentina) Diego Maradona	1976–81	116
3	(Argentina) Pedro Pasculli	1980–85	87
4	(Argentina) Rafael Moreno	1971–75, 1979	82
5	(Argentina) Miguel Turello	1938–42	71

=== Most appearances ===
Rank.	Player	Tenure	Match.
1	(Argentina) **Oscar Di Stéfano**	1948–59	333
2	(Argentina) Sergio Batista	1981–88, 1990–91	299
3	(Argentina) Miguel A. Torrén (Note: Still active.)	2010–present	286
4	(Argentina) Mario Sciarra	1952–61	279
5	(Argentina) Pascual Di Paola	1923–32, 1935–38	273

== Former coaches ==
- (Argentina) Ramón Muttis (1940)
- (Argentina) Francisco Fandiño (1955)
- (Argentina) Carlos Cavagnaro (1969)
- (Argentina) Oswaldo Panzuto (1970)
- (Argentina) Osvaldo "Chiche" Sosa (1970–71), (1974)
- (Argentina) Francisco Cornejo (1976)
- (Argentina) José Varacka (1981)
- (Argentina) Osvaldo "Chiche" Sosa (1981)
- (Argentina) Juan Carlos Lorenzo (1981)
- (Argentina) Ángel Labruna (1981–84)
- (Argentina) Roberto Saporiti (1984)
- (Argentina) José Yudica (1985–86)
- (Argentina) Roberto Saporiti (1986)
- (Uruguay) Roberto Fleitas (1987)
- (Argentina) Jorge Olguín (1988)
- (Argentina) José Yudica (1991–92)
- (Argentina) Patricio Hernández (1992)
- (Argentina) Osvaldo "Chiche" Sosa (1992–94)
- (Uruguay) Luis Garisto (1994)
- (Argentina) Roberto Saporiti (1995–96)
- (Argentina) Carlos Fren (1996)
- (Argentina) Jorge Olguín (1996)
- (Argentina) Osvaldo "Chiche" Sosa (1997–00)
- (Argentina) Jorge Solari (1 July 2001–30 June 02)
- (Argentina) Ricardo Rezza (1 July 2002–30 Dec 02)
- (Argentina) Ricardo Gareca (3 Jan 2003–30 Dec 03)
- (Argentina) Sergio Batista (1 Jan 2004–30 June 04)
- (Argentina) Osvaldo "Chiche" Sosa (2004–05)
- (Uruguay) Gregorio Pérez (1 Aug 2005–16 July 06)
- (Argentina) Adrián Domenech (2006)
- (Argentina) Ricardo Caruso Lombardi (1 Jan 2007–31 Aug 07)
- (Argentina) Néstor Gorosito (10 Sept 2007–31 Dec 08)
- (Argentina) Claudio Vivas (22 Dec 2008–25 May 09)
- (Argentina) Claudio Borghi (26 May 2009–30 June 10)
- (Argentina) Pedro Troglio (6 June 2010–18 Sept 11)
- (Argentina) Néstor Gorosito (20 Sept 2011–28 Feb 12)
- (Argentina) Jorge Borelli (interim) (28 Feb 2012–1 March 12)
- (Argentina) Leonardo Astrada (1 March 2012–4 Nov 12)
- (Argentina) Carlos Mayor (interim) (6 Nov 2012–21 Nov 12)
- (Argentina) Gabriel Schurrer (15 Nov 2012–22 Feb 13)
- (Argentina) Ricardo Caruso Lombardi (13 March 2013–11 Dec 13)
- (Argentina) Claudio Borghi (1 Jan 2014–24 Oct 2014)
- (Argentina) Nestor Gorosito (30 Oct 2014–30 Nov 2015)
- (Argentina) Carlos Alberto Mayor (10 Dec 2015–4 Mar 2016)
- (Argentina) Raúl Sanzotti (4 Mar 2016–28 Apr 2016)
- (Argentina) Gabriel Heinze (20 Jun 2016–31 Jul 2017)
- (Argentina) Alfredo Berti (4 Aug 2017–17 Sep 2018)
- (Argentina) Ezequiel Carboni (18 Sep 2018–12 Nov 2018)
- (Argentina) Raúl Sanzotti (interim) (19 Nov 2018–31 Dec 2018)
- (Argentina) Diego Dabove (1 Jan 2019–13 Jan 2021)
- (Argentina) Gabriel Milito (19 Jan 2021–30 August 2023)
- (Argentina) Cristian Zermatten (interim) (30 Aug 2023–7 Sep 2023)
- (Argentina) Pablo Guede (8 Sep 2023–20 Aug 2024)
- (Argentina) Cristian Zermatten (interim) (20 Aug 2024–19 Nov 2024)
- (Argentina) Norberto Batista (interim) (22 Nov 2024–16 Dec 2024)
- (Argentina) Nicolás Diez (1 Jan 2025–)

== Presidents ==
- Pablo Paolella (1901–07)
- Leandro Ravera Bianchi (1904–07)
- Tomás Tericone (1907–11)
- Teófilo Pebe (1911–16)
- Emilio Couy (1916–22)
- Pipo Manujovich (1922–27)
- Juan Guglielmetti (1927–32)
- Domingo Capitani (1932–39)
- Gastón García Miramón (1939–43)
- Emilio Ardoy (1943–47)
- Antonio Delporto (1947–54)
- Mario Fiore (1954–62)
- Juan Bautista Molinari (1962–66)
- Domingo Deker (1966–70)
- Arturo Gracía Vázquez (1970–73)
- Osvaldo Sanguinetti (1973–75)
- Mariano Boggiano (1975–76)
- Florentino Alen (1976–77)
- Carlos Pascual Osorio, Juan Fiori & Omar Santiago Gallo (1977)
- Próspero Víctor Cónsoli (1977–81)
- Domingo Tesone (1981–92)
- Luis Veiga (1992–95)
- Ricardo Bravo (1995–96)
- Oscar Giménez (1996-02)
- Luis Segura (2002–2014)
- Rubén Forastiero (2014–2015)
- Cristian Malaspina (2015–present)

== Stadium ==
The club currently plays in the Estadio Diego Armando Maradona which is also often referred to as La Paternal after the La Paternal district of Buenos Aires where the club is based. The stadium was named after Diego Maradona because he started his career in the Argentinos youth team. Between 1983 and 2003 Argentinos had a groundshare with Ferro Carril Oeste at Estadio Ricardo Etcheverry. The club has had a number of other homes in its history, all based in the city of Buenos Aires.

== Nicknames ==
The club, which is nicknamed Bichos Colorados (Red Bugs), is a large source of football players in Argentina. Diego Maradona, Fernando Redondo, Juan Román Riquelme and Alexis Mac Allister being some of the most famous players who began their career at the club. This ability to keep producing world class players has given them the nickname El Semillero, meaning the Nursery or the "Seed Garden".

== Honours ==
=== Senior titles ===
Keys

- Record
- ^{(s)} Shared record

Type	Competition	Titles	Winning years
National (League)	Primera División	3	1984 Metropolitano, 1985 Nacional, 2010 Clausura
International	Copa Libertadores	1	1985
International	Copa Interamericana	1	1985

=== Other titles ===
Titles won in lower divisions:

- Primera B Nacional (2): 1996–97, 2016–17
- Primera B (2): 1940 (Note: Although having won the championship, the team did not earn promotion to Primera División.), 1955
