= Roger Nordstrand =

Swedish footballer

Personal information
- Full name: Roger Magnus Nordstrand
- Date of birth: 20 May 1973 (age 53)
- Position: Midfielder

Senior career*
Years	Team	Apps	(Gls)
1989–1995	Örgryte IS		
1995	SK Brann	7	(1)
1996–1998	Stenungsunds IF		
1999–2002	Halmstads BK		

International career
1988–1989	Sweden U17	18	(7)
1989–1991	Sweden U19	16	(4)
1993	Sweden U21	1	(0)
- * Club domestic league appearances and goals

Roger Magnus Nordstrand (born 20 May 1973) is a Swedish former football midfielder. He was a squad member for Sweden at the 1991 FIFA World Youth Championship.
