= Santi Cuesta =

Spanish footballer

Personal information
- Full name: Santiago Cuesta Díaz
- Date of birth: 11 August 1971 (age 55)
- Place of birth: Avilés, Spain
- Height: 1.82 m (5 ft 11 1/2 in)
- Positions: Left-back; midfielder

Youth career
- Avilés

Senior career*
| Years | Team | Apps | (Gls) |
| 1989–1991 | Valladolid B | | |
| 1990–1992 | Valladolid | 27 | (0) |
| 1992–1994 | Espanyol | 26 | (0) |
| 1994–1995 | Valladolid | 5 | (0) |
| 1995–1997 | Toledo | 52 | (5) |
| 1997–1998 | Castellón | 30 | (5) |
| 1998–1999 | Ceuta | 6 | (0) |
| 1999–2000 | Cacereño | 20 | (1) |
| Total | | 166 | (11) |

International career
| 1989–1990 | Spain U18 | 13 | (0) |
| 1991 | Spain U19 | 4 | (0) |
| 1991 | Spain U20 | 4 | (0) |
| 1991–1993 | Spain U21 | 13 | (0) |
| 1991 | Spain U23 | 1 | (0) |
- * Club domestic league appearances and goals

Santiago 'Santi' Cuesta Díaz (born 11 August 1971 in Avilés, Asturias) is a Spanish retired footballer who played as a left-back and midfielder.
