= Shaun Rouse =

English footballer

Personal information
- Full name: Shaun Rouse
- Date of birth: 28 February 1972 (age 54)
- Place of birth: Great Yarmouth, England
- Position: Midfielder

Senior career*
Years	Team	Apps	(Gls)
1991–1992	Rangers	0	(0)
1992–1993	Bristol City	0	(0)
1993–1994	Carlisle United	5	(0)
1994–1995	Weston-super-Mare		
1995–1996	Gloucester City		
1996–1997	Witney Town		
- * Club domestic league appearances and goals

Shaun Rouse (born 28 February 1972) is an English former professional footballer who played in the Football League as a midfielder.
