= Rasmus Svensson =

Swedish footballer (born 1971)

Personal information
- Full name: Rasmus Rikard Svensson
- Date of birth: 5 September 1971 (age 55)
- Position: Defender

Senior career*
Years	Team	Apps	(Gls)
1991	Malmö FF	2	(0)
1992–1996	Halmstads BK	61	(3)
1997	Falkenbergs FF		

International career
1987–1988	Sweden U17	20	(2)
1989–1991	Sweden U19	22	(2)
1992–1993	Sweden U21	11	(2)
- * Club domestic league appearances and goals

Rasmus Rikard Svensson is a Swedish former professional footballer who played as a defender. He represented the Sweden U21 team at the 1992 UEFA European Under-21 Championship where Sweden finished second.
