= 1985 Argentine Campeonato Nacional finals =

1985 Campeonato Nacional final
- Event: 1985 Campeonato Nacional
Argentinos Juniors	Vélez Sarsfield
1 (3)	1 (4)
- on penalties
- Date: 28 August 1985
- Venue: River Plate Stadium, Buenos Aires
- Referee: Ricardo Calabria

1985 Campeonato Nacional final rematch
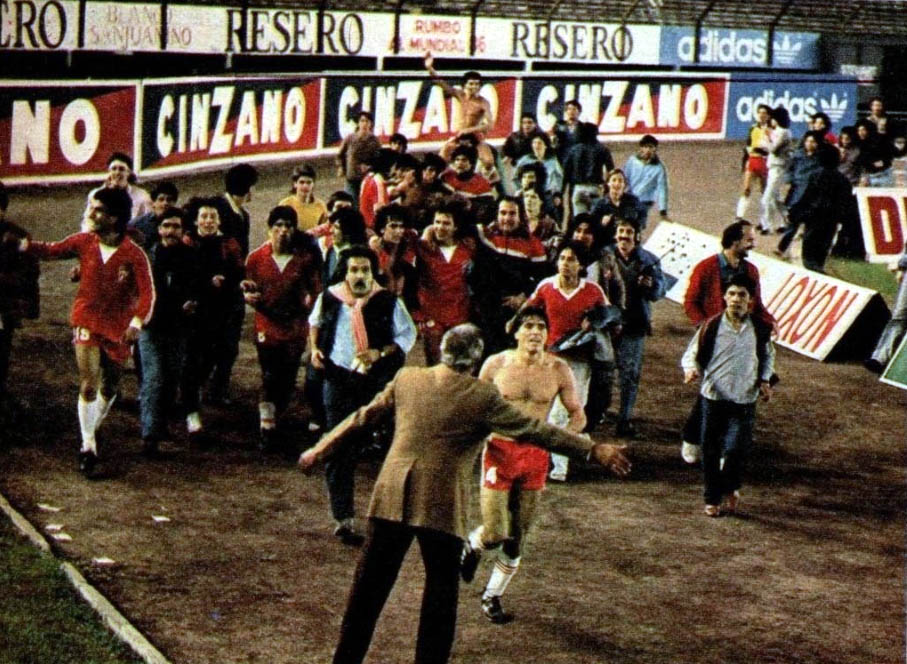
- Argentinos Juniors, Nacional champions, during the lap of honour
- Event: 1985 Campeonato Nacional
Argentinos Juniors	Vélez Sarsfield
2	1
- Date: 4 Sep 1985
- Venue: River Plate Stadium, Buenos Aires
- Referee: Juan Bava

The 1985 Campeonato Nacional finals were the final matches of the 1985 Campeonato Nacional, the only league championships held during the 94th. season of the Argentine Primera División. The finals were played between Argentinos Juniors (winner of round of winners) and Vélez Sarsfield (winner of round of losers. Both clubs contested their first Primera División final).

The final ane replay match were held in Estadio Monumental, home of C.A. River Plate.

It was the last Torneo Nacional final before returning to a single championship from the 1985–86 season. The format of Campeonato Nacional would be later replicated in the second division with the inception of Primera Nacional in 1986, with 13 berths for clubs outside Buenos Aires.

Vélez Sarsfield won the final 4–3 on penalties but Argentinos Juniors, as the team from the round of winners group, earned right to play a second match in order to decide a champion. In the second match, Argentinos Juniors defeated Vélez 2–1 to win their second league title.

== Background ==
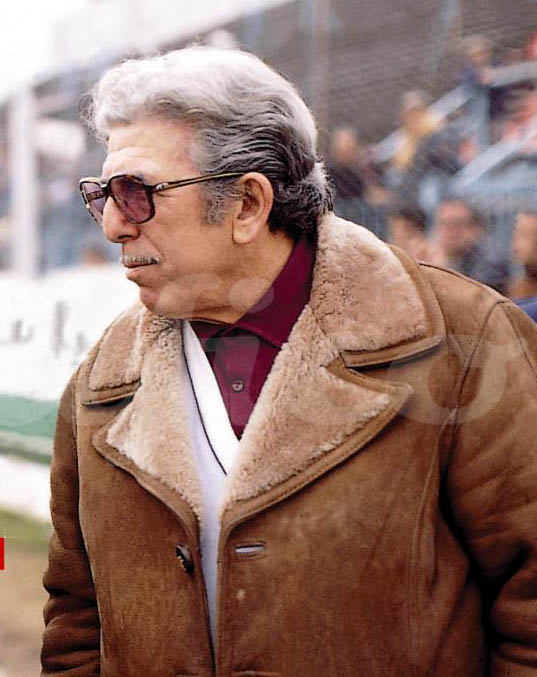
Although he only remained one year, Angel Labruna is regarded as the manager who started to build the team that would win two consecutive titles

Roots to the Argentinos Juniors' successful can be traced to 1983, when Angel Labruna was hired as manager of the team. He demanded the club executives to bring first-class players in order to make a competitive team and fight for a championship. Therefore Ubaldo Fillol (only played a few matches before being traded to Brazilian CR Flamengo), José Luis Pavoni (from Pumas UNAM), Miguel Lemme (from Estudiantes de La Plata), and winger José "Pepe" Castro (Independiente) were hired by the club.

Nevertheless, Labruna left his charge that same year, being replaced by Roberto Saporiti while new players arrived in the club, they were Jorge Olguín (world champion with Argentina in 1978), Juan José López (from Boca Juniors), Emilio Commisso from River Plate, Carlos Morete from Independiente, and Enrique Vidallé from Huracán, all of them with a long experience in Primera División.

Under Saporiti's management, Argentinos won their first title, the 1984 Metropolitano. In 1985, José Yudica was hired as manager of the team.

Argentinos Juniors had won the 1984 Metropolitano with the same footballers that played the final v Vélez, with the exception of striker Pedro Pasculli (topscorer of the season), transferred to Italian US Lecce.

The emergence of Claudio Borghi, considered a bright young star to match Diego Maradona's level, brought a new level of gameplay skill to the team.

On the other hand, Vélez Sársfield was managed by Alfio Basile, who would then took charge as manager of Racing Club that achieved promotion to Primera División in December that year after defeating Atlanta 5–1 on goal difference.

== Qualified teams ==
Team	Qualif	Previous app.
Argentinos Juniors	Winner of round of winners	(none)
Vélez Sarsfield	Winner of round of losers	(none)

- Bold: indicates winning years
- Met: Campeonato Metropolitano
- Nac: Campeonato Nacional

== Venuee ==
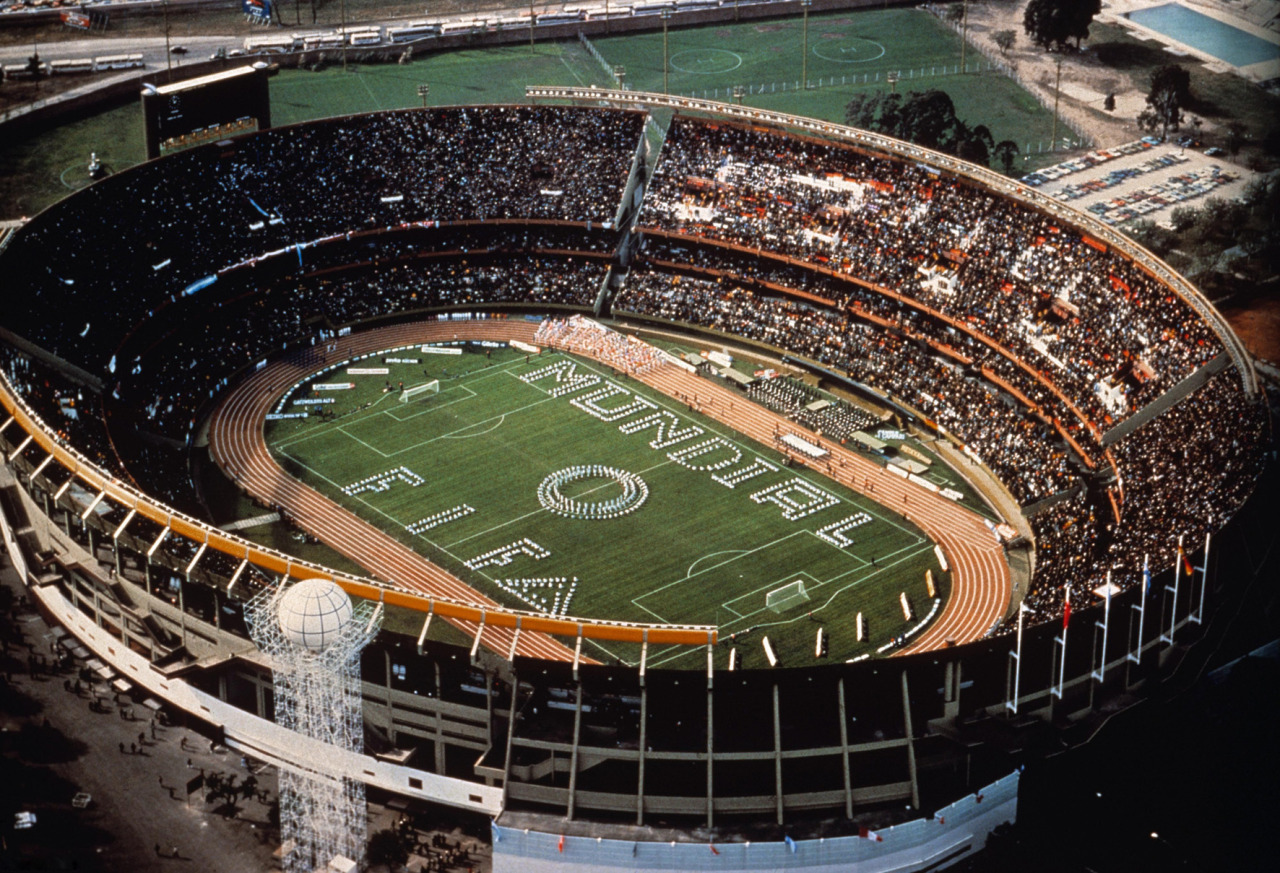
Estadio Monumental, venue for both matches

The final and rematch were held in Estadio Monumental, in Buenos Aires, owned by C.A. River Plate.

Opened in 1938, the stadium had been the main venue in the 1951 Pan American Games and hosted several matches of the 1978 FIFA World Cup. It had a capacity of near 74,000 spectactors in those times.

== Road to the final ==
Participant teams were divided into 8 groups of 4 teams each. They played each other in a double round-robin tournament. The best two placed teams of each group qualified to the round of winners, while the 3rd and 4th of each group were moved to the round of losers.

Argentinos Juniors				Round	Vélez Sarsfield			
Opponent	Result			Group stage	Opponent	Result		
Central Norte	8–0 (H)			Matchday 1	Argentino (F)	1–1 (A)		
Chacarita Juniors	1–0 (H)			Matchday 2	Juventud Alianza	2–1 (A)		
Belgrano (C)	4–2 (A)			Matchday 3	San Martín (T)	3–3 (H)		
Chacarita Juniors	2–2 (A)			Matchday 4	Juventud Alianza	3–0 (H)		
Belgrano (C)	1–1 (H)			Matchday 5	San Martín (T)	0–1 (A)		
Central Norte	0–0 (H)			Matchday 6	Argentino (F)	2–0 (H)		
**Group F winners**: Pos. / Team / Pts / W / T / L / Pl; 1 / Argentinos Juniors / 9 / 3 / 3 / 0 / 6; 2 / Chacarita Juniors / 7 / 3 / 1 / 2 / 6; 3 / Central Norte / 5 / 1 / 3 / 2 / 6; 4 / Belgrano (C) / 3 / 0 / 3 / 3 / 6				Final standings (1st stage)	**Group G winners**: Pos. / Team / Pts / W / T / L / Pl; 1 / San Martín (T) / 8 / 3 / 2 / 1 / 6; 2 / Vélez Sarsfield / 8 / 3 / 2 / 1 / 6; 3 / Argentino (F) / 5 / 2 / 1 / 3 / 6; 4 / Juventud Alianza / 3 / 1 / 1 / 4 / 6			
Opponent	Agg.	1st leg	2nd leg	Knockout stage	Opponent	Agg.	1st leg	2nd leg
San Lorenzo	3–2	2–2 (A)	1–0 (H)	Round 2	Boca Juniors	4–3	2–3 (A)	2–0 (H)
Opponent	Score (Note: Played as a single match in neutral venue.)			Round 3	Opponent	Score		
San Martín (T)	1–0 (N)			Round 4	Newell's Old Boys	2–1 (a.e.t.) (N)		
Ferro Carril Oeste	3–0 (N)			Round 5	River Plate	3–0 (N)		
Opponent	Agg.	1st leg	2nd leg	Winners round finals	Opponent	Agg.	1st leg	2nd leg
Vélez Sarsfield	2–2 (3–4 p)	2–0 (H)	0–2 (A)	Round 2	Argentinos Juniors	2–2 (4–3 p)	0–2 (A)	2–0 (H)

== Matches ==
The final was contested by winners of round of winners and round of losers (Argentinos Juniors and Vélez Sarsfield respectively). The rules, based on a sporting advantage system, stated that if Vélez was the winner, Argentinos (as the best placed team in the tournament) would have a chance to play a second match.

=== Final ===
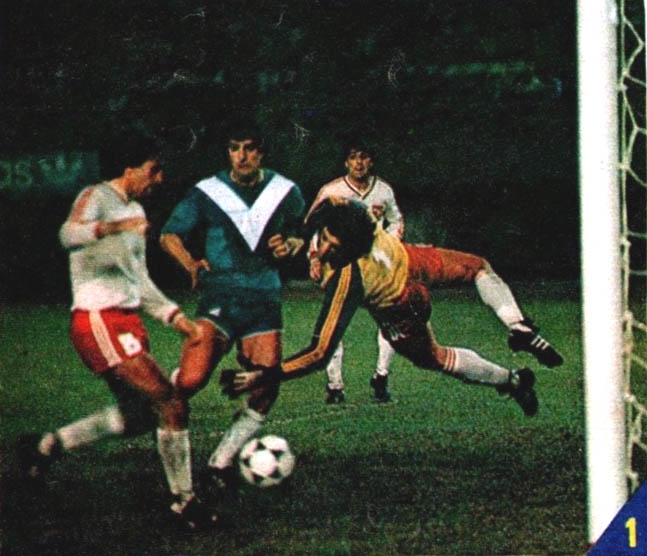
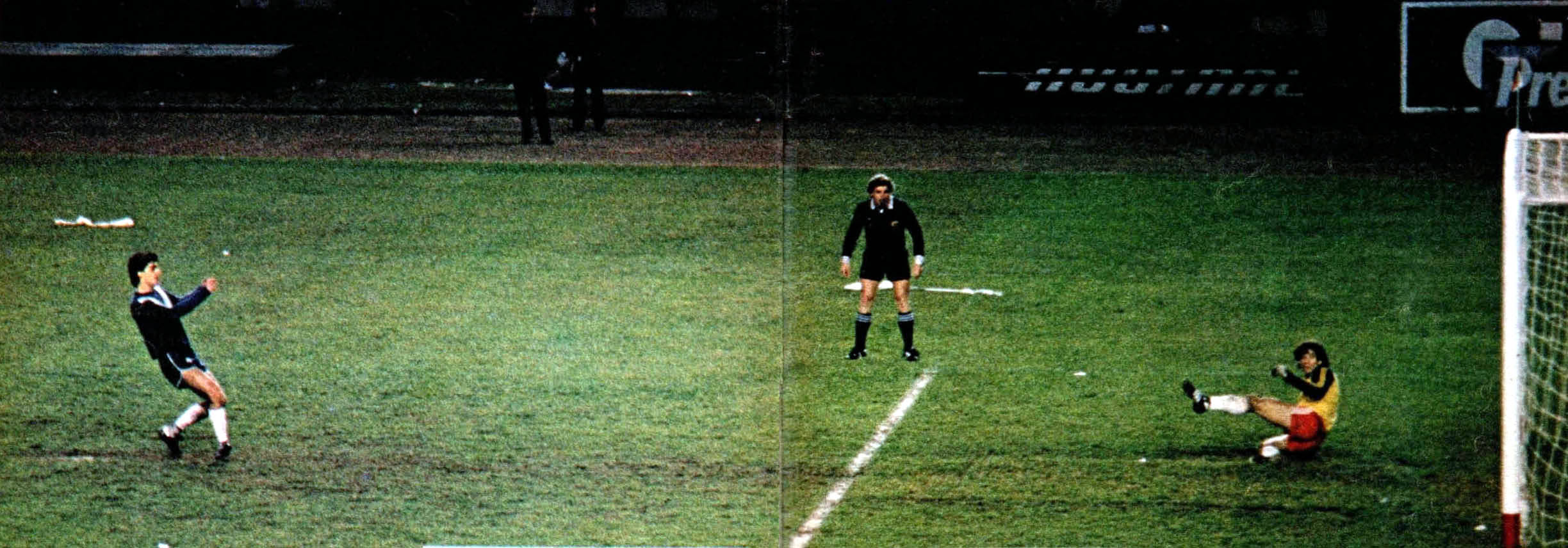
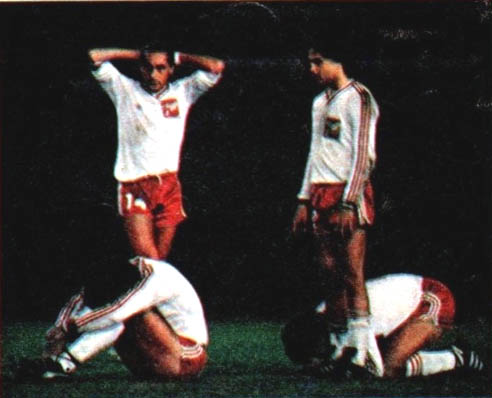
Fltr: the own goal by Jorge Olguín, Mario Lucca scoring his penalty, and the Argentinos players' heartbreak after losing on penalties
1985 Torneo Nacional Final
28 August 1985

Argentinos Juniors	1–1	Vélez Sársfield
Borghi 40'	Report	Olguín 79' (o.g.)
Penalties
Batista (penalty scored); Videla (penalty scored); J.J.López (penalty scored); Castro (penalty missed); Pellegrini (penalty missed)	3–4	(penalty scored) Larraquy; (penalty scored) Gabrich; (penalty scored) Cuciuffo; (penalty scored) Lucca; (penalty missed) E. Hernández

River Plate Stadium, Buenos Aires
Referee: Ricardo Calabria

**Argentinos Juniors**	**Vélez Sársfield**

GK	1	(Argentina) Enrique Vidallé
DF	4	(Argentina) Carmelo Villalba
DF	2	(Argentina) José Luis Pavoni
DF	6	(Argentina) Jorge Olguín
DF	3	(Argentina) Adrián Domenech	(substituted off) 118'
MF	10	(Argentina) Emilio Commisso
MF	5	(Argentina) Sergio Batista
MF	8	(Argentina) Mario Videla
FW	7	(Argentina) José A. Castro
FW	9	(Argentina) Claudio Borghi
FW	11	(Argentina) Carlos Ereros	(substituted off) 97'
Substitutes:
MF		(Argentina) Juan José López	(substituted on) 97'
DF		(Argentina) Jorge Pellegrini	(substituted on) 118'
GK	12	(Paraguay) César R. Mendoza
MF		(Argentina) Miguel Lemme
FW		(Argentina) Carlos Morete
Manager:
(Argentina) José Yudica

GK	1	(Colombia) Carlos Navarro Montoya
DF	4	(Argentina) Mario Lucca
DF	2	(Argentina) Pedro Larraquy
DF	6	(Argentina) José Luis Cuciuffo
DF	3	(Argentina) Jorge Bujedo
MF	8	(Argentina) Oscar A. Gissi
MF	5	(Argentina) Carlos Fren	(substituted off) 101'
MF		(Argentina) Osvaldo Coloccini	(substituted off) 75'
MF	10	(Argentina) Juan José Meza	(substituted off) 45'
FW	7	(Argentina) Eduardo D. Hernández
FW	11	(Argentina) Jorge Comas
Substitutes:
MF		(Argentina) Fabián A. Vázquez	(substituted on) 75'
FW		(Argentina) Jorge Gabrich	(substituted on) 45'
GK		(Argentina) Jorge L. Fernández
MF		(Argentina) Carlos Amodeo
FW		(Argentina) Víctor A. Lucero
Manager:
(Argentina) Alfio Basile

=== Rematch ===
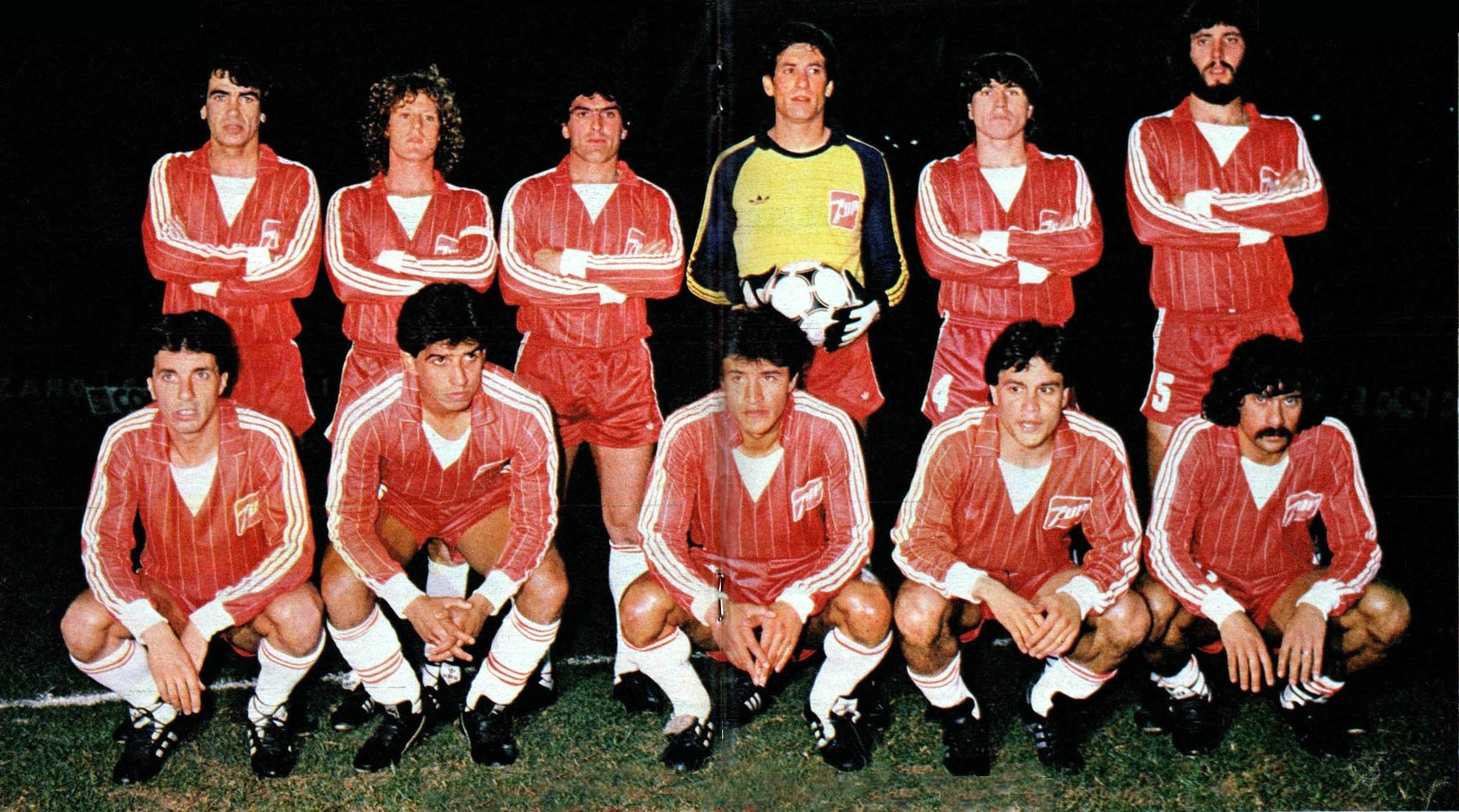
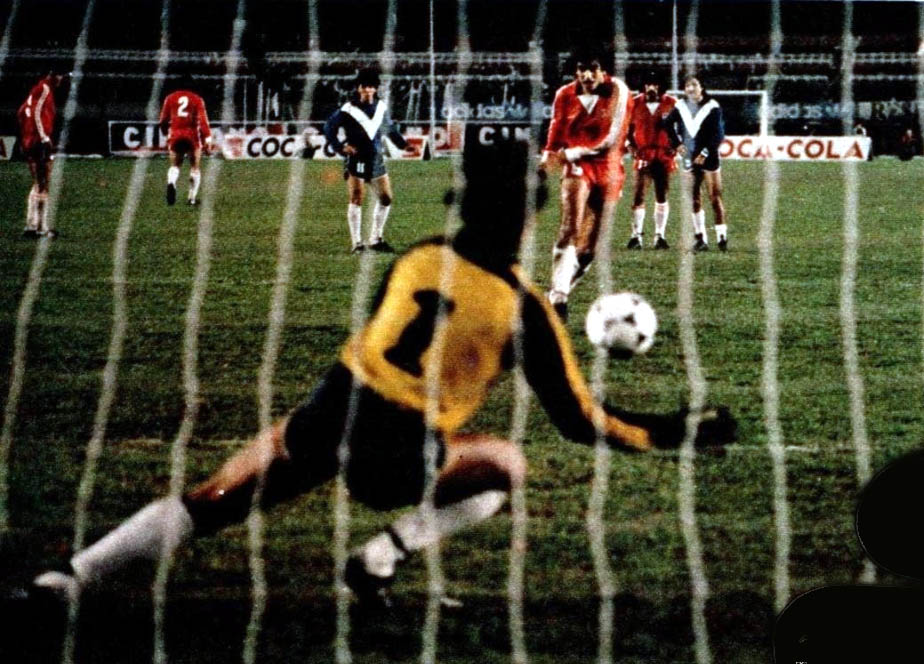
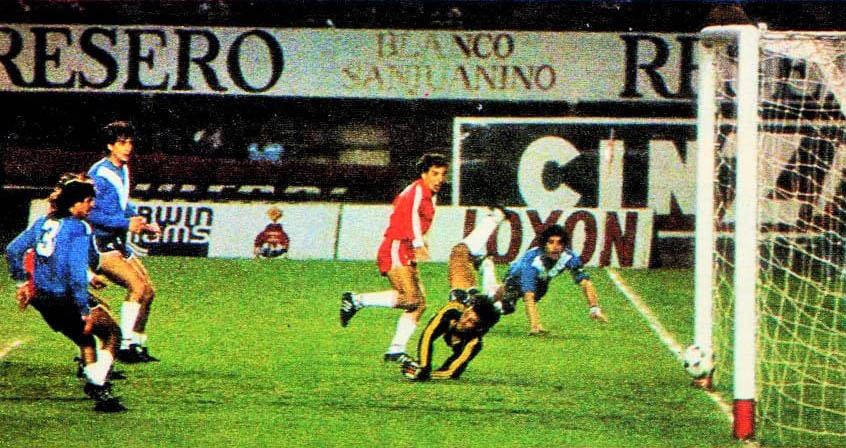
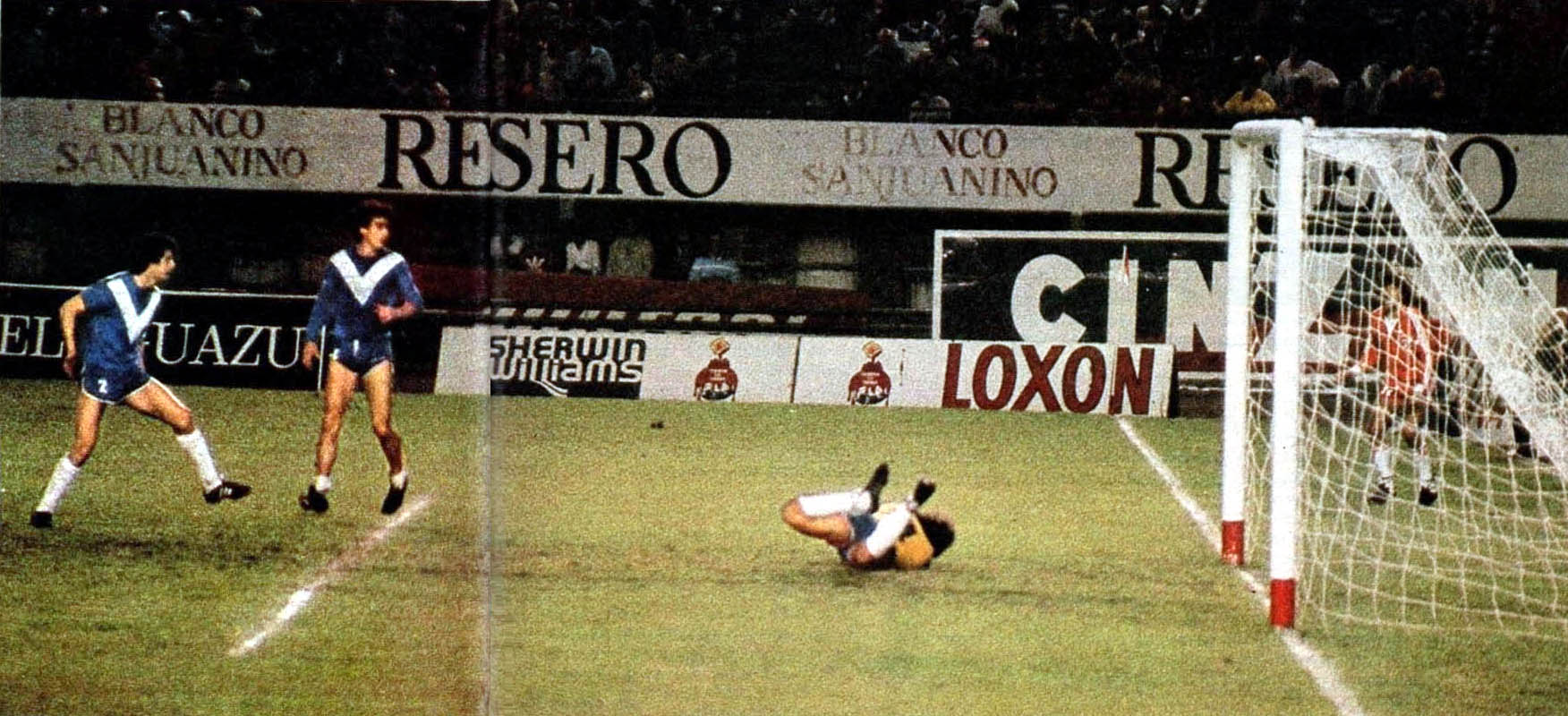
Fltr: Team of Argentinos, Navarro Montoya saving a penalty, José Castro and Sergio Batista goals
4 September 1985
Rematch

Vélez Sársfield	1–2	Argentinos Juniors
Comas 58'	Report (1); Report (2)	Castro 50'; Batista 80'

River Plate, Buenos Aires
Referee: Juan Bava

**Vélez Sársfield**	**Argentinos Jrs**

GK	1	(Colombia) Carlos Navarro Montoya
DF	4	(Argentina) Mario Lucca
DF	2	(Argentina) Pedro Larraquy
DF	6	(Argentina) José Luis Cuciuffo
DF	3	(Argentina) Jorge Bujedo
MF	8	(Argentina) Oscar A. Gissi	(substituted off) 83'
MF	5	(Argentina) Osvaldo Coloccini	(substituted off) 73'
MF	10	(Argentina) Juan José Meza
FW	7	(Argentina) Eduardo D. Hernández
FW	9	(Argentina) Jorge Gabrich
FW	11	(Argentina) Jorge Comas
Substitutes:
MF		(Argentina) Carlos G. Amodeo	(substituted on) 73'
MF		(Argentina) Fabián A. Vázquez	(substituted on) 83'
GK		(Argentina) Jorge L. Fernández
DF		(Argentina) Héctor W. López
FW		(Argentina) Víctor A. Lucero
Manager:
(Argentina) Alfio Basile

GK	1	(Argentina) Enrique Vidallé
DF	4	(Argentina) Carmelo Villalba
DF	2	(Argentina) José Luis Pavoni
DF	6	(Argentina) Jorge Olguín
DF	3	(Argentina) Adrián Domenech
MF	10	(Argentina) Emilio Commisso
MF	5	(Argentina) Sergio Batista
MF	8	(Argentina) Mario Videla
FW	7	(Argentina) José A. Castro
FW	9	(Argentina) Claudio Borghi	(substituted off) 81'
FW	11	(Argentina) Carlos Ereros
Substitutes:
MF		(Argentina) Miguel Lemme	(substituted on) 81'
GK		(Paraguay) César R. Mendoza
DF		(Argentina) Jorge Pellegrini
MF		(Argentina) Juan José López
FW		(Argentina) Carlos Morete
Manager:
(Argentina) José Yudica

== Aftermath ==
With this title, Argentinos Jrs achieved their only (and conseucutive, after the 1984 Metropolitano league title.

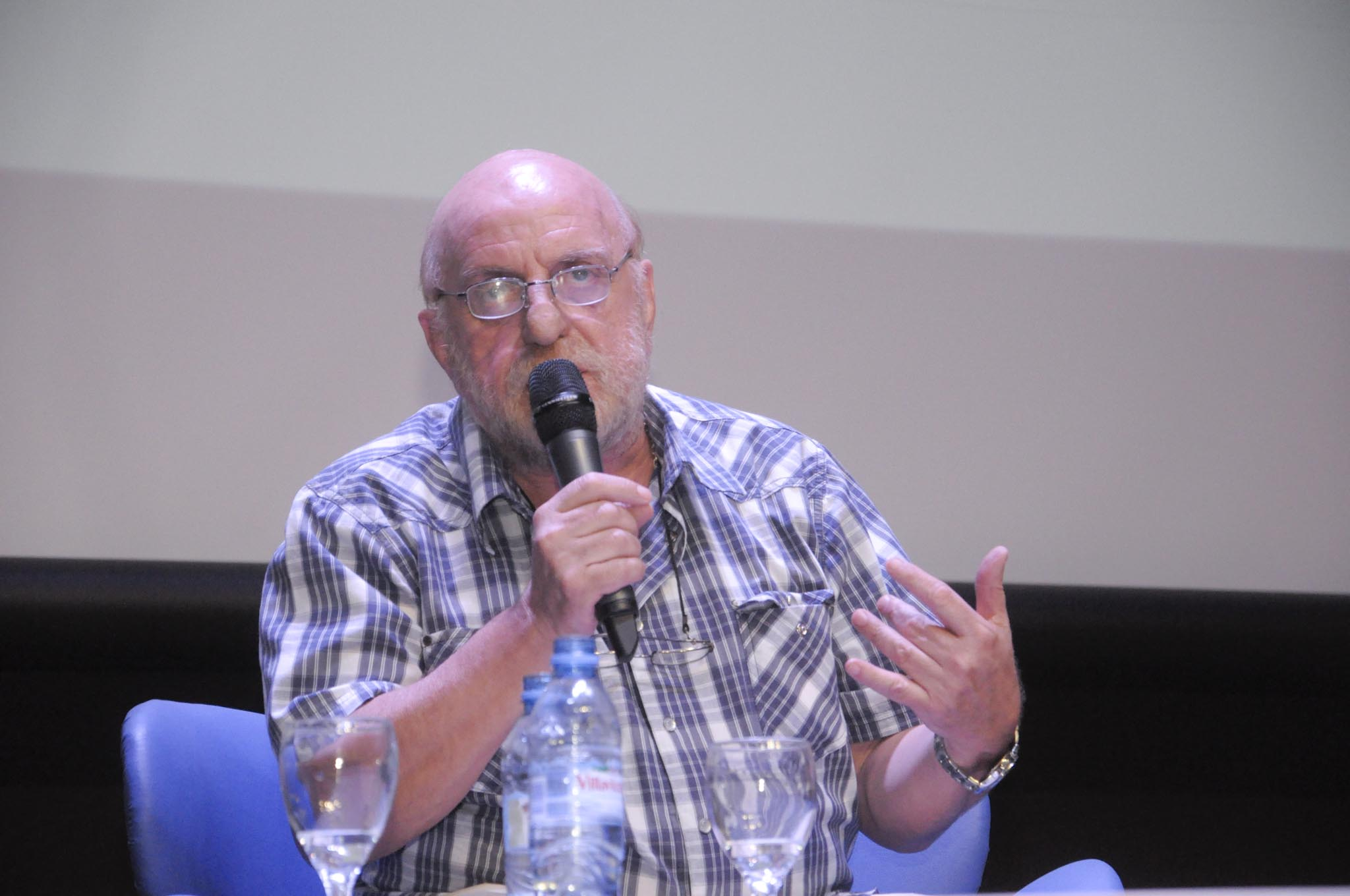
Horacio Pagani (pictured) was one of the sports journalists that praised not only the Argentinos Juniors win, but their playstyle

Sports journalist Horacio Pagani wrote on Clarín they day after the match: "Argentinos want to play football well, and they play. Without so much theoretical fuss. Sometimes they play better, sometime worse, but they play anyway".

Other journalists also praised Argentinos Juniors' style of play, such as Natalio Gorín on El Gráfico, defining the team as "the best, without doubts". He highlighted the superiority of the team over their rival, stating that the main difference between them was Argentinos Juniors elaborated their goals, while Vélez scored after mistakes from their rivals. Gorín also emphasized that Argentinos was the champion not only because of their style of play but because overcoming adversity in certain moments of the series. "They had the attitude of a champion", according to his words.

For his part, midfielder Sergio Batista (who scored the 2nd goal in the rematch) recognised former manager Ángel Labruna as the "builder" of that Argentinos team, stating that under his guidance, the club from La Paternal went from being a team whose only objective was not to be relegated to a really competitive squad.

That Argentinos Juniors team would later play a memorable final v Juventus, a match regarded as the best Intercontinental Cup ever played, due to the technical virtues of both teams.

== Bibliography ==
- El Gráfico editions:
  - 3439, 29 Aug 1985
  - 3440, 10 Sep 1985
