= 1977 Argentine Campeonato Nacional finals =

1977 Campeonato Nacional finals
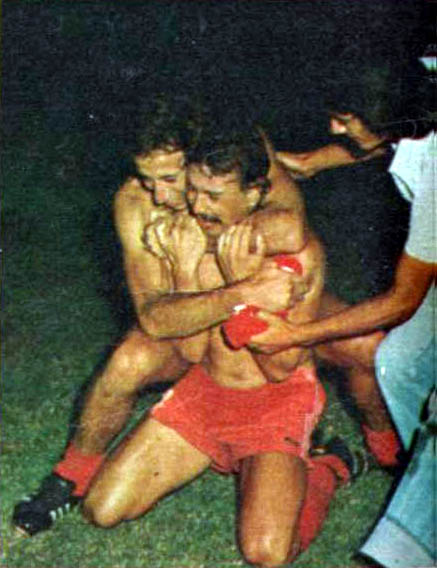
- Players of Independiente celebrating
- Event: 1977 Campeonato Nacional
| Independiente | Talleres (C) |
| 3 | 3 |
- Independiente won on away goals rule

First leg
| Independiente | Talleres (C) |
| 1 | 1 |
- Date: 21 January 1978
- Venue: La Doble Visera, Avellaneda

Second leg
| Talleres (C) | Independiente |
| 2 | 2 |
- Date: 25 January 1978
- Venue: Estadio La Boutique, Córdoba
- Referee: Roberto Barreiro

The 1977 Campeonato Nacional finals were the final matches of the 1977 Campeonato Nacional, the only league championships held during the 86th. season of the Argentine Primera División. The finals were played between Independiente (who contested their 3rd. Primera División final) and Talleres de Córdoba (first final for the club).

The finals (played under a two-legged tie) were held in La Doble Visera, home of C.A. Independiente, while the second match was held in Estadio La Boutique, onwed by Talleres. The finals are well remembered due to the fact that in the second match, Independiente could equalise the series with three of their players being sent off. With both matches having ended in a draw (1–1 and 2–2), Independiente won the series 2–1 based on the away goals rule, achieving their 11th. league title.

Independiente's performance in Córdoba has been called "epic", and, mostly, a "feat" Moreover, many Independiente fans regard this final as "the greatest feat in the history of the club".

== Background ==
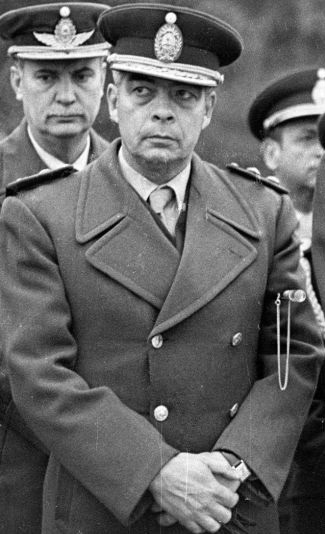
General Luciano B. Menéndez had a strong influence in Cordobese football, with some pointing him as trying to favor Talleres in the finals

As the Estadio Olímpico was not yet finished (it was being refurbished for the 1978 World Cup), Talleres played their home games at its ground in the Barrio Jardín Espinosa neighborhood, in the southeast of the city. The province (and the whole country) was ruled with an iron fist by the military dictatorship, whose most prominent figure was general Luciano Benjamín Menéndez.

The rumors circulating in Córdoba were simple and unequivocal. The military leaders wanted to "give the people of Córdoba some joy." Talleres had caused a football revolution in the province when it began to compete in the national tournaments of 1974, 1975, and 1976, and it seemed that their time to become champions had finally arrived.

In 2021, journalist Ernesto Cherquis Bialo revealed that then president of AFA Julio Grondona had warned Indpendiente manager José Pastoriza about referee Roberto Barreiro's performances refereeing Talleres de Córdoba, stating that the Cordobese team had never lost in six matches refereed by him. Grondona also told Pastoriza that Barreiro had sent off four Talleres rivals in four matches, as well as awarding Talleres a penalty kick in four out of six matches. Grondona also highlighted the high influence of general Menéndez over Cordobese football and his increasing pressure for Talleres to win a championship.

I need you to talk to the players so we start with eleven and finish with eleven, nothing more

— Julio Grondona to José Pastoriza some days before the finals

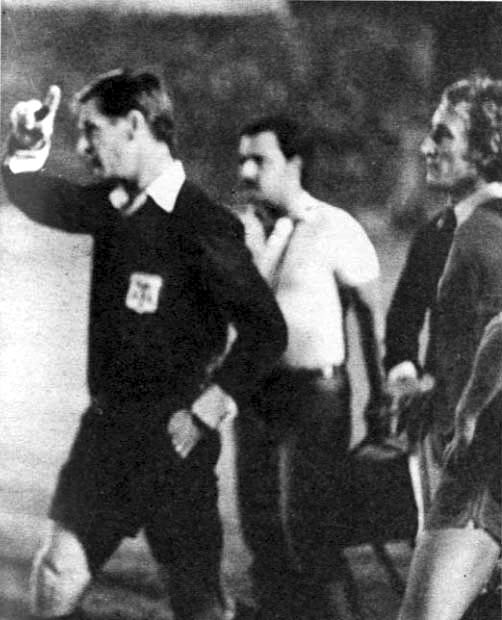
Referee Roberto Barreiro had had a controversial performance in the Platense v Lanús relegation match played two months before the finals

1977 had not been a good year for Roberto Barreiro, the experienced referee chosen to officate the final. He had officiated the relegation playoff in November of that year, when Platense played against Lanús in a full-attendance San Lorenzo Stadium. Barreiro violated the rules of the time, allowing penalties to continue at the same goal after the first series of five shots ended in a draw. Furthermore, he failed to notice that a Platense player —goalkeeper Osmar Miguelucci— and a Lanús midfielder —Julio Crespo— had not taken their penalties, allowing Miguel Juárez and Orlando Cárdenas to take them a second time in their place, something that was not permitted until the entire team had taken their penalty. That match, known as "the night of the penalties" or "the most dramatic night in Argentine football", had a total of 22 penalties kicked, with goalkeeper Miguelucci stopping four of them. Platense won the shoot out 8–7 to secure their stay in Primera División while Lanús was relegated to Primera B Metropolitana.

Feeling harmed by Barreiro's errors, Lanús sued the Association. Several years after, the court rouled in favor of the club and Lanús was compensated.

== Qualified teams ==
| Team | Previous app. |
|---|---|
| Independiente | 1912 (FAF), 1932 |
| Talleres (C) | (none) |

- Bold: indicates winning years
- Met: Campeonato Metropolitano
- Nac: Campeonato Nacional

== Venues ==
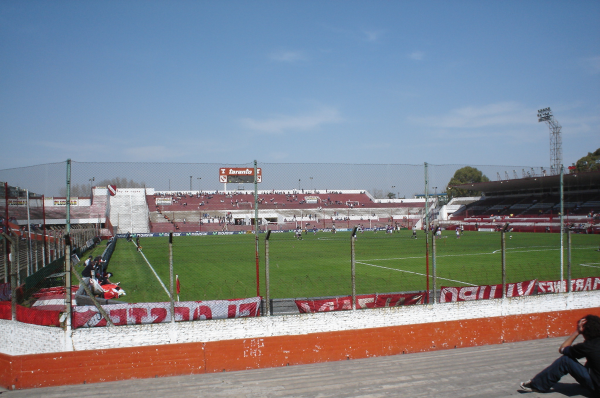
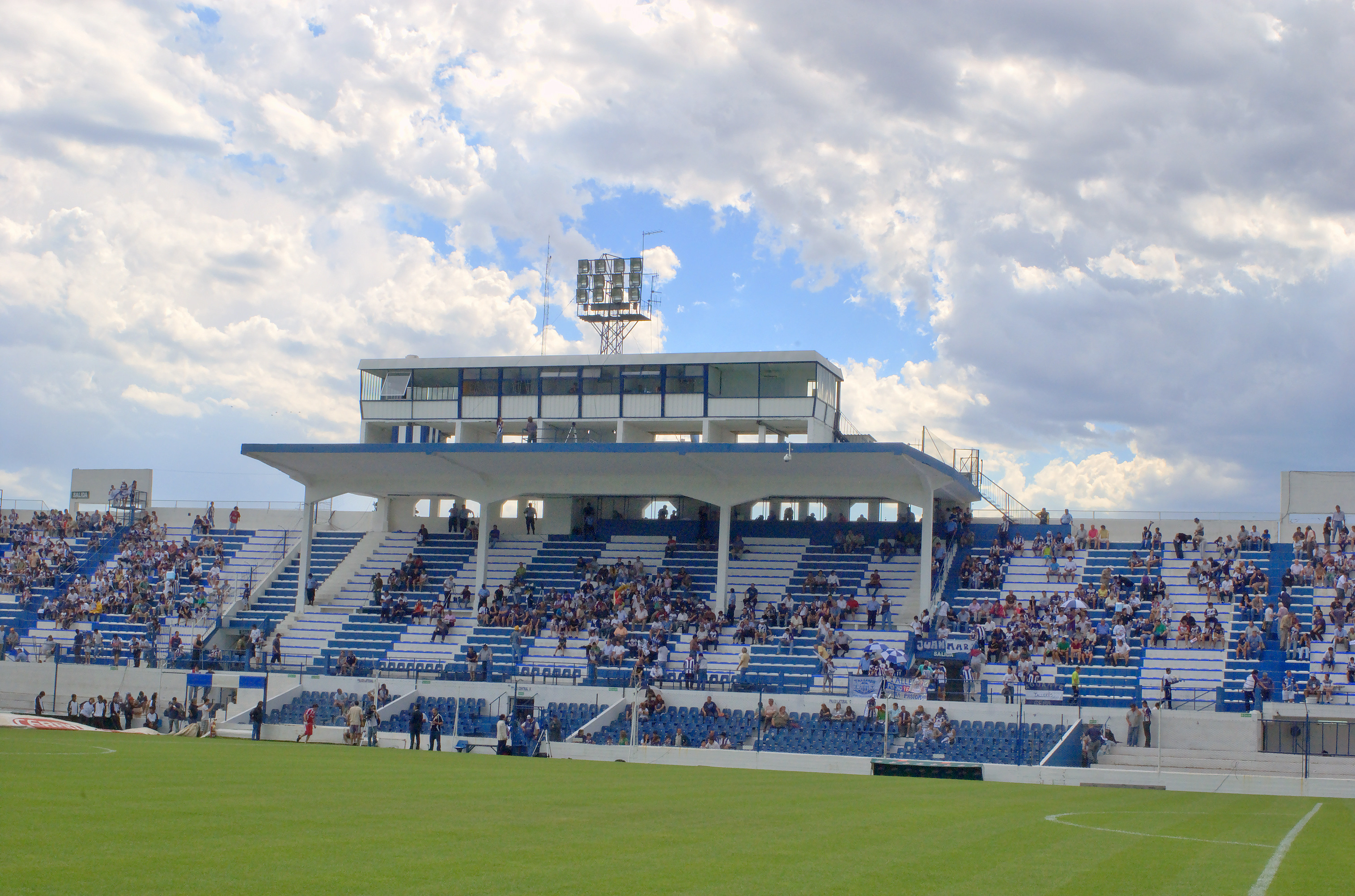
La Doble Visera in Avellaneda (left), and La Boutique in Córdoba, venues for the finals

== Road to the final ==
Participant teams were divided into four zones of four teams each, playing in a double round-robin tournament. The best placed team of each zone qualified for the semifinals, played under a two-legged system.

| Independiente | | | | Round | Talleres (C) | | | |
|---|---|---|---|---|---|---|---|---|
| Opponent | Result | | | Group stage | Opponent | Result | | |
| Huracán | 4–2 (A) | | | Matchday 1 | Colón | 1–5 (A) | | |
| Atlanta | 2–0 (H) | | | Matchday 2 | Gimnasia y Esgrima (J) | 2–0 (H) | | |
| All Boys | 3–2 (A) | | | Matchday 3 | River Plate | 0–3 (A) | | |
| Unión (SF) | 2–2 (H) | | | Matchday 4 | Sarmiento (R) | 4–2 (H) | | |
| Belgrano (C) | 1–2 (A) | | | Matchday 5 | Racing | 2–1 (A) | | |
| Atlético Ledesma | 2–0 (H) | | | Matchday 6 | Vélez Sarsfield | 2–0 (A) | | |
| Argentinos Juniors | 2–0 (A) | | | Matchday 7 | Platense | 2–1 (H) | | |
| Huracán | 2–0 (H) | | | Matchday 8 | Colón | 5–1 (H) | | |
| Atlanta | 2–0 (A) | | | Matchday 9 | Gimnasia y Esgrima (J) | 3–0 (A) | | |
| All Boys | 3–0 (H) | | | Matchday 10 | River Plate | 1–0 (H) | | |
| Unión (SF) | 3–2 (A) | | | Matchday 11 | Sarmiento (R) | 1–1 (A) | | |
| Belgrano (C) | 3–0 (H) | | | Matchday 12 | Racing | 1–0 (H) | | |
| Atlético Ledesma | 0–1 (A) | | | Matchday 13 | Vélez Sarsfield | 2–2 (H) | | |
| Argentinos Juniors | 1–2 (H) | | | Matchday 14 | Platense | 1–4 (A) | | |
| **Group D winners**: Pos. / Team / Pts / W / T / L / Pl; 1 / Independiente / 21 / 10 / 1 / 3 / 14; 2 / Belgrano (C) / 19 / 8 / 3 / 3 / 14; 3 / Huracán / 15 / 6 / 3 / 5 / 14; 4 / Atlanta / 13 / 5 / 3 / 6 / 14 | | | | Final standings | **Group E winners**: Pos. / Team / Pts / W / T / L / Pl; 1 / Talleres (C) / 24 / 9 / 2 / 3 / 14; 2 / Racing / 17 / 6 / 5 / 3 / 14; 3 / River Plate / 15 / 7 / 1 / 6 / 14; 4 / Vélez Sarsfield / 15 / 6 / 3 / 5 / 14 | | | |
| Opponent | Agg. | 1st leg | 2nd leg | Knockout stage | Opponent | Agg. | 1st leg | 2nd leg |
| Estudiantes (LP) | 4–2 | 1–1 (A) | 3–1 (H) | Semifinals | Newell's Old Boys | 2–1 | 1–1 (H) | 1–0 (A) |

== Pre-match ==
Fans from neighboring provinces arrived in Córdoba to support Talleres, without even knowing if they would get a ticket. From very early on, the stadium was at its full capacity, including the temporary stands erected to increase its capacity. Celebrations before the match included paratroopers, military bands, acrobatic displays. Even supporters of C.A. Belgrano cheered on their eternal rival.

== Matches ==
=== First leg ===
1977 Campeonato Nacional Final
21 January 1978
First leg

| Independiente | 1–1 | Talleres (C) |
|---|---|---|
| Trossero | Report | Cherini |

Estadio La Doble Visera, Avellaneda

=== Second leg ===
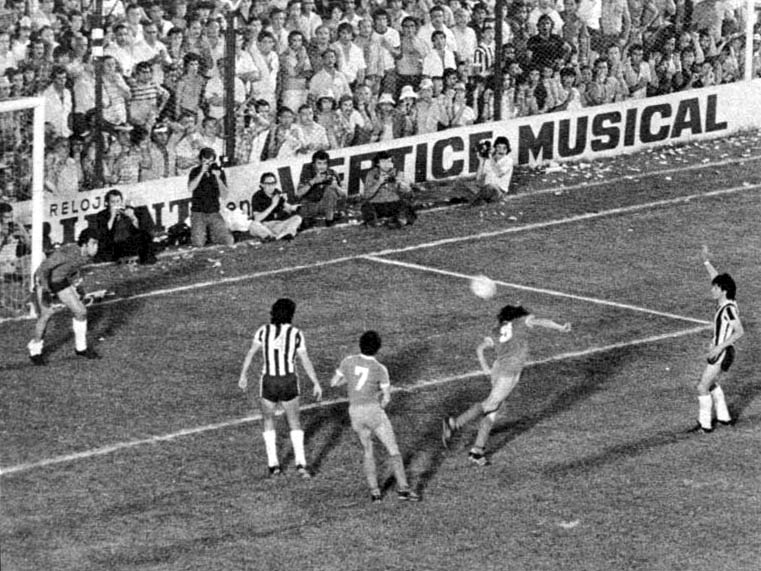
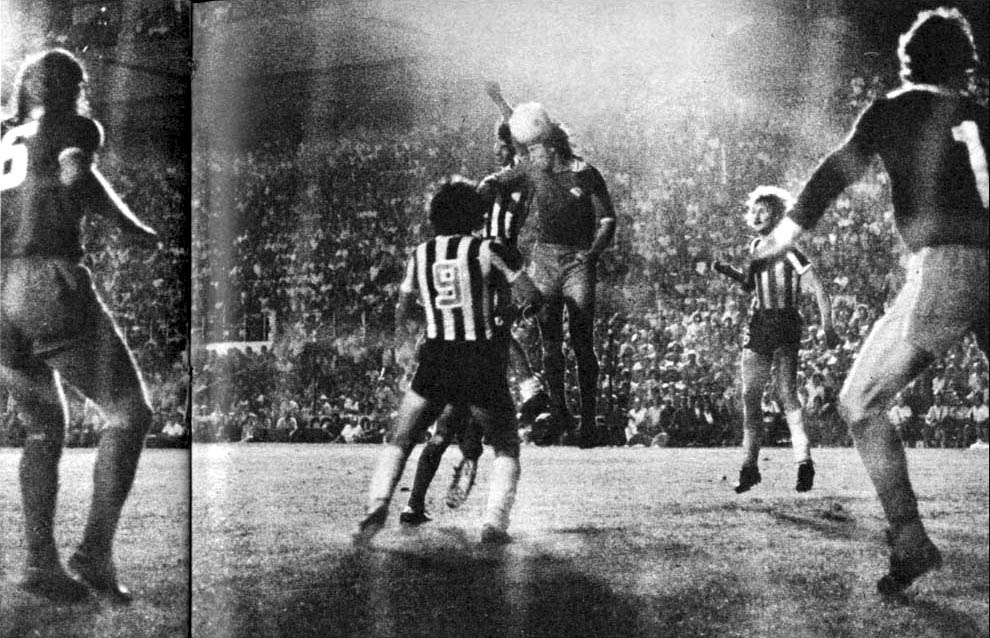
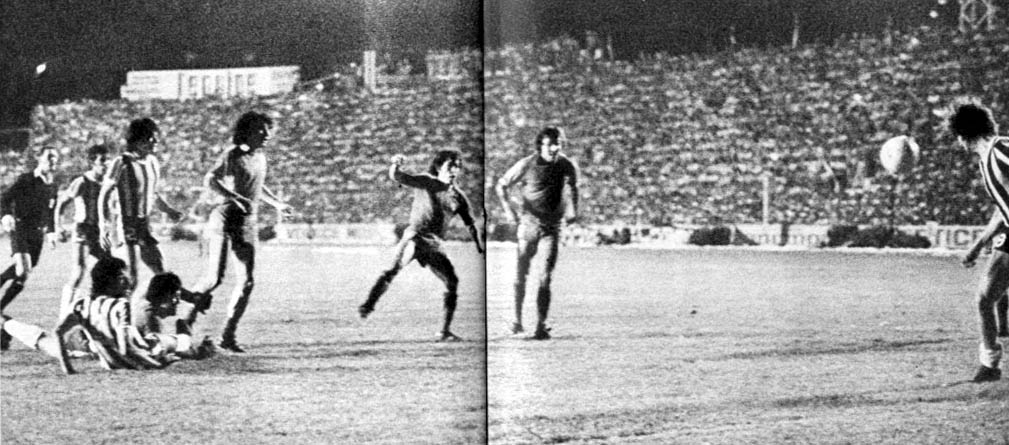
Crucial moments of the match, fltr: (above): Norberto Outes set the 1–0 for Independiente, Bocanelli equalises for Talleres; (below): Independiente's second goal by Ricardo Bochini that crowned them as champions

Independiente took the lead in the 29th. minute with a header by striker Norberto Outes, but in the 60th minute referee Roberto Barreiro awarded a penalty kick to Talleres which was fiercely debated by Independiente players. As the referee keep on his decission, winger Ricardo Cherini equalised the match. In the 70th minute, Talleres' Ángel Bocanelli apparently touched the ball with his hand before scoring the 2–1 for his team. However, the foul by the Talleres striker was clearly visible on the national television broadcast on Canal 7.

As the Independiente players loudly claimed the referee to invalidate the goal, Barreiro sent off Rubén Galván, Omar Larrosa, and Enzo Trossero (in that order), abruptly leaving the visiting team with three players less on the field.

Independiente players decided to leave the field in protest, but manager José Pastoriza insisted on remaining on the pitch to continue the game. Pastoriza also made two substitutions (Mariano Biondi and Daniel Bertoni entered the field) to revert the situation. In the 83th minute, Pagnanini passed to Bochini in the midfield zone, Bochini dribbled an opponent before a short pass to Bertoni, who quickly passed the ball to Biondi, he dribbled goalkeeper Guidbaudo before passing to Bochini, who came running. The number 10 shot to score the 2nd goal for his team. After equalising, Independiente retreated to their own goal while Talleres bombarded them with shots, but couldn't find the net for a third goal. Two fine saves from Rigante, two shots from Boccanelli that went just wide, and little else before the final whistle.

25 January 1978
Second leg

| Talleres (C) | 2–2 | Independiente |
|---|---|---|
| Cherini 60' (pen.); Bocanelli 74' | Report | Outes 29'; Bochini 83' |

Estadio La Boutique, Córdoba
Attendance: 19,551
Referee: Roberto Barreiro

| **Talleres (C)** | **Independiente** |

| GK | 1 | (Argentina) Rubén Guibaudo |
| DF | 4 | (Argentina) Eduardo Astudillo |
| DF | 2 | (Argentina) Luis Galván |
| DF | 6 | (Argentina) Víctor Binello |
| DF | 3 | (Argentina) Victorio Ocaño |
| MF | 8 | (Argentina) José O. Reinaldi | Substituted off |
| MF | 5 | (Argentina) Luis A. Ludueña |
| MF | 10 | (Argentina) Daniel Valencia |
| FW | 7 | (Argentina) Ángel Bocanelli |
| FW | 9 | (Argentina) Humberto Bravo |
| FW | 11 | (Argentina) Ricardo Cherini |
Substitutes:
| MF | | (Argentina) Antonio Syeyyguil | Substituted on |
Manager:
(Argentina) Roberto Saporiti

| GK | 1 | (Argentina) Roberto Rigante |
| DF | 4 | (Argentina) Rubén Pagnanini |
| DF | 2 | (Argentina) Hugo Villaverde |
| DF | 6 | (Argentina) Enzo Trossero | Sent off (straight red) |
| DF | 3 | (Argentina) Osvaldo Pérez |
| MF | 8 | (Argentina) Omar Larrosa | Sent off (straight red) |
| MF | 5 | (Argentina) Rubén Galván | Sent off (straight red) |
| MF | 10 | (Argentina) Ricardo Bochini |
| FW | 7 | (Argentina) Pedro Magallanes | | Substituted off |
| FW | 9 | (Argentina) Norberto Outes |
| FW | 11 | (Argentina) César Brítez | | Substituted off |
Substitutes:
| MF | | (Argentina) Mariano Biondi | | Substituted on |
| FW | | (Argentina) Daniel Bertoni | | Substituted on |
Manager:
(Argentina) José Pastoriza

== Aftermath ==
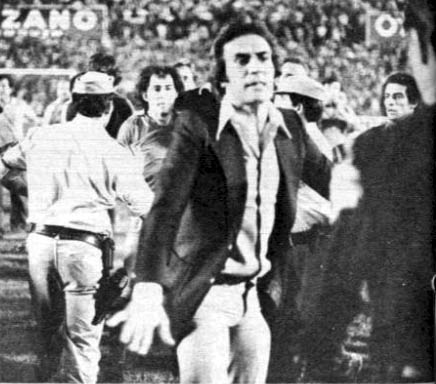
Despite three Independiente players had been sent off, manager José Pastoriza encouraged his players to remain on the pitch and continue playing

Independiente's performance in Córdoba has been called "epic" and mostly, a "feat" while many Independiente fans regard this final as "the greatest feat in the history of the club". Sports magazine El Gráfico defined the match as "one of the biggest feats in the history of Argentine football", Football historian and journalist Alejandro Fabbri described the result as "a miracle" for Independiente.

Independiente players that had been sent off were severely punished: Enzo Trossero was suspended for 12 matches, while Rubén Galván y Omar Larrosa received less, with 6 matches each. As all of them were then called up by César Menotti to play for Argentina during the team's preparation for the 1978 FIFA World Cup, they served their time off the pitch while training with the national team. Referee Roberto Barreiro continued active for one season more, then retiring from football.

A referee can't make that many mistakes. In that play, when the cross came in, Outes jumped with Boccanelli, and when he saw he wasn't going to reach it, the Talleres player punched the ball. Referee Barreiro was facing the action, so I don't understand how he allowed the goal...

— Independiente goalkeeper Roberto Rigante in an interview with Clarín, 27 Feb 1978

I was very nervous after such an injustice and wanted to leave the field. Pastoriza convinced us to keep going and we were able to tie it with three men down

— Ricardo Bochini

Independiente owes that title to Pastoriza. He told his players: "Go out and play, be men and win the title"

— Talleres defender Miguel Oviedo, who was injured and could not play
