= 1979 Campeonato Nacional finals =

Football matches in Argentina

- Event: Campeonato Nacional
Unión	River Plate
1	1
- on aggregate River Plate won on away goals

First leg
Unión	River Plate
1	1
- Date: 19 December 1979
- Venue: Estadio 15 de Abril, Santa Fe
- Referee: Teodoro Nitti
- Attendance: 15,693

Second leg
River Plate	Unión
0	0
- Date: 23 December 1979
- Venue: Estadio Monumental, Buenos Aires
- Referee: Jorge Eduardo Romero
- Attendance: 32,735

The 1979 Campeonato Nacional finals were the final matches of the 1979 Campeonato Nacional, the second of the two league championships held during the 88th season of Argentine football. The two-legged event was contested between Unión de Santa Fe and River Plate. The first leg was played at the Estadio 15 de Abril, Santa Fe on 19 December 1979 and the second leg was played on 23 December 1979 at the Estadio Monumental, Buenos Aires.

Each club needed to progress through the group stage and two knockout rounds to reach the final, playing 18 matches in total. River Plate were the runners-up of their group, facing Vélez Sarsfield and Rosario Central before reaching the final. Unión also finished in second place of their group, and subsequently beat Talleres de Córdoba and Atlético Tucumán to progress to the final.

== Qualified teams ==
Team	Previous finals app.
River Plate	**1932**, **1936** (Note: The 1936 season was divided into two single round-robin tournaments, "Copa Campeonato" (won by River Plate) and "Copa de Honor" (won by San Lorenzo). At the end of the season, both teams played the "Copa de Oro", a single match won by River. In its Memoria y Balance (Annual Report) published by the AFA that year, River Plate is mentioned as "1936 Champion" while San Lorenzo is only mentioned as "Copa de honor winning team". In its 100th anniversary book published in 1993, the AFA listed River Plate as the only 1936 champion. In 2013, the AFA included three 1936 championships on its website, mentioning River Plate as Copa de Oro and Copa Campeonato winner and San Lorenzo as Copa de Honor winner, therefore both clubs were added one league title to their honours. Moreover, some historians consider Copa de Oro a national cup instead of a league championship, stating that it was only contested to qualify an Argentine representative to play the Copa Aldao against the Uruguayan champion.) , 1969 Met, 1976 Nac, 1978 Nac
Unión	(none)

- Bold: indicates winning years
- Met: Campeonato Metropolitano
- Nac: Campeonato Nacional

== Venues ==
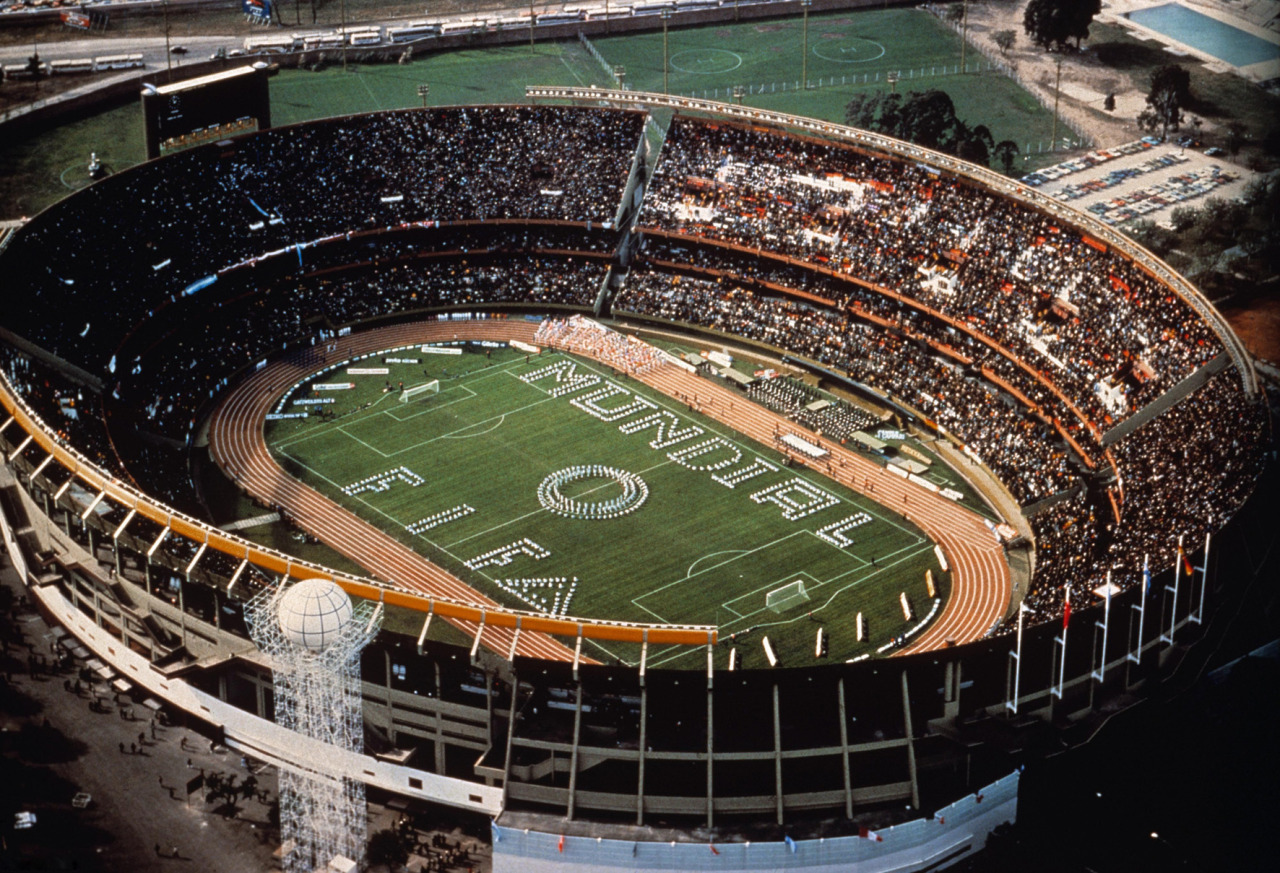
Estadio 15 de Abril (left) and Estadio Monumental (right), venues

== Matches ==
=== First leg ===
December 19, 1979

Unión	1–1	River Plate
Mazzoni 78'	Report	Alonso 88'

Estadio 15 de Abril, Santa Fe
Attendance: 15,693
Referee: Teodoro Nitti

**Unión**	**River Plate**

GK	1	(Argentina) Nery Pumpido
DF	4	(Argentina) Hugo Ismael López
DF	2	(Argentina) Carlos Mazzoni
DF	6	(Argentina) Pablo Cardenas
DF	3	(Argentina) Oscar Regenhardt
MF	8	(Argentina) Mario Alberto
MF	5	(Argentina) Roberto Telch
MF	10	(Argentina) Héctor Pitarch
FW	7	(Argentina) Arsenio Ribeca	(substituted off) 76'
FW	9	(Argentina) Juan Gerónimo Paz	(substituted off) 72'
FW	11	(Argentina) Fernando Alí
Substitutes:
GK	12	(Argentina) Carlos Biasutto
DF		(Argentina) Ricardo Bertolé
MF		(Argentina) Víctor Arroyo	(substituted on) 76'
MF		(Argentina) Víctor Torres
FW		(Argentina) Eduardo Stelhik	(substituted on) 72'
Manager:
(Argentina) Reynaldo Volken

GK	1	(Argentina) Ubaldo Fillol
DF	4	(Argentina) Eduardo Saporiti
DF	2	(Argentina) Daniel Lonardi
DF	6	(Argentina) Daniel Passarella (c)
DF	3	(Argentina) Héctor Osvaldo López
MF	8	(Argentina) Juan José López
MF	5	(Argentina) Reinaldo Merlo
MF	10	(Argentina) Norberto Alonso
FW	7	(Argentina) Ramón Díaz	(substituted off) 72'
FW	9	(Argentina) Leopoldo Luque
FW	11	(Argentina) Emilio Commisso
Substitutes:
GK	12	(Argentina) Luis Landaburu
DF		(Argentina) José Luis Pavoni
MF		(Uruguay) Juan Ramón Carrasco
FW		(Argentina) Pedro González	(substituted on) 72'
FW		(Argentina) Oscar Ortiz
Manager:
(Argentina) Ángel Labruna

=== Second leg ===
December 23, 1979

River Plate	0–0	Unión
	Report

Estadio Monumental, Buenos Aires
Attendance: 32,735
Referee: Jorge Eduardo Romero

**River Plate**	**Unión**

GK	1	(Argentina) Ubaldo Fillol
DF	4	(Argentina) Eduardo Saporiti
DF	2	(Argentina) Daniel Lonardi
DF	6	(Argentina) Daniel Passarella (c)
DF	3	(Argentina) Héctor Osvaldo López
MF	8	(Argentina) Juan José López
MF	5	(Argentina) Reinaldo Merlo
MF	10	(Argentina) Norberto Alonso
FW	7	(Argentina) Pedro González	(substituted off) 67'
FW	9	(Argentina) Leopoldo Luque
FW	11	(Argentina) Emilio Commisso
Substitutes:
GK	12	(Argentina) Luis Landaburu
DF		(Argentina) José Luis Pavoni
DF		(Uruguay) Alfredo de los Santos
MF		(Uruguay) Juan Ramón Carrasco
FW		(Argentina) Ramón Díaz	(substituted on) 67'
Manager:
(Argentina) Ángel Labruna

GK	1	(Argentina) Nery Pumpido
DF	4	(Argentina) Hugo Ismael López
DF	2	(Argentina) Carlos Mazzoni
DF	6	(Argentina) Pablo Cardenas
DF	3	(Argentina) Oscar Regenhardt
MF	8	(Argentina) Mario Alberto	(substituted off) 55'
MF	5	(Argentina) Roberto Telch
MF	10	(Argentina) Héctor Pitarch
FW	7	(Argentina) Arsenio Ribeca
FW	9	(Argentina) Juan Gerónimo Paz	(substituted off) 45'
FW	11	(Argentina) Fernando Alí
Substitutes:
GK	12	(Argentina) Carlos Biasutto
DF		(Argentina) Ricardo Bertolé
MF		(Argentina) Víctor Arroyo	(substituted on) 55'
MF		(Argentina) Víctor Torres
FW		(Argentina) Eduardo Stelhik	(substituted on) 45'
Manager:
(Argentina) Reynaldo Volken
