= Carlos Squeo =

Argentine footballer (1948–2019)

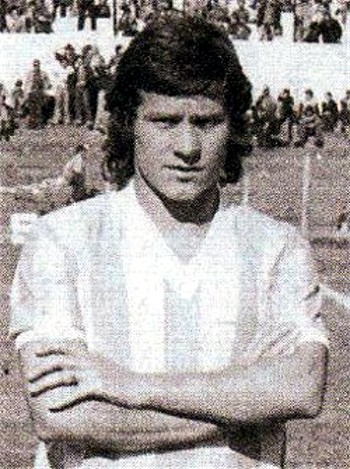

Personal information
- Full name: Carlos Vicente Squeo
- Date of birth: 4 June 1948
- Place of birth: Dock Sud, Argentina
- Date of death: 8 September 2019 (aged 71)
- Position: Defender

Youth career
- Racing Club

Senior career*
Years	Team	Apps	(Gls)
1969–1972	Racing Club	305 (total)	(34)
1973	Vélez Sársfield	12	(5)
1974–1977	Racing Club	(See above)	
1977–1979	Boca Juniors	67	(1)
1979–1980	Jalisco	?	(?)
1981–1983	Loma Negra	26	(0)
1983	Instituto de Córdoba	33	(1)
1984	Racing Club	(See above)	
1985	Belgrano de Córdoba	6	(1)
1985–1986	Dock Sud	56	(8)
1986–1987	Alumni de Villa María	?	(?)

International career
1973–1974	Argentina	9	(0)
- * Club domestic league appearances and goals as of 19 October 2007

Carlos Vicente Squeo (4 June 1948 in Dock Sud, Avellaneda – 8 September 2019) was an Argentine football defender. He played for several clubs in Argentina and Mexico and represented the Argentina national football team at the 1974 FIFA World Cup.

== Playing career ==
Squeo started his career with Racing Club in 1969, he went on to become one of the club's longest serving players, notching up 305 games and 35 goals for the club in three spells.

Squeo had a short spell with Vélez Sársfield in 1973 before returning to Racing in 1974. Later that year he was called up to play for Argentina in the 1974 World Cup, but he only made 2 appearances in the competition.

In 1977 Squeo was sold to Boca Juniors where he was part of the Copa Libertadores 1978 winning squad.

In 1979 Squeo joined (now defunct) Gallos de Jalisco in Mexico, he returned to Argentina in 1981 to play for Loma Negra.

Squeo then joined Instituto de Córdoba in 1983 before dropping down a division to try to help Racing Club to regain their status in the Primera División Argentina.

Squeo had one last spell in the Primera with Belgrano de Córdoba before spending the last years of his career playing in the lower leagues for Dock Sud and Alumni de Villa María in 1986 under manager Miguel Ángel Brindisi.

== Coaching career ==
Squeo served as Brindisi's field assistant for many years following his retirement as a player. He worked with Brindisi at a number of clubs including Racing Club, Boca Juniors, Independiente, Club Atlético Huracán, Club Atlético Lanús, Espanyol in Spain and the Guatemala national football team.

== Honours ==
=== Player ===
Racing

- Primera División runner-up: 1972 Metropolitano
- Intercontinental Champions' Supercup runner-up: 1969

Boca Juniors

- Copa Libertadores: 1978
- Primera División runner-up: 1978 Metropolitano
