= Mario Husillos =

Argentine footballer and manager

Personal information
- Full name: Armando Mario Husillos Herrero
- Date of birth: 5 February 1959 (age 67)
- Place of birth: Morón, Argentina
- Position: Striker

Senior career*
Years	Team	Apps	(Gls)
1977–1979	Boca Juniors	39	(10)
1979–1980	Castilla	8	(3)
1980–1982	Loma Negra		
1982–1983	San Lorenzo	33	(18)
1983	Cartagena		
1983–1985	Murcia	28	(7)
1985	Estudiantes		
1985–1988	CD Málaga	91	(33)
1988–1989	Tenerife	8	(3)
1989–1991	Cádiz	46	(9)
1991	Cartagena		
1991–1992	Málaga	6	(1)
1992–1993	Cieza		
1993–1994	Atlético Malagueño		

Managerial career
- 1999–2000: Almagro
- 2004–2005: Murcia
- 2006–2007: Málaga B
- * Club domestic league appearances and goals

Armando Mario Husillos Herrero (born 5 February 1959) is an Argentine football manager and former player who most recently was the director of football at English club West Ham United. He played as a striker during a career that began at Boca Juniors in 1973. He was top scorer in the 1983 Nacional championship, while playing for Loma Negra. He spent much of his career in Spain and played in Málaga during three different periods. After his retirement, he managed Almagro and Murcia, and had spells as sporting director at Málaga.

== Playing career ==
Husillos started his professional playing career in 1977 with Boca Juniors, where he was part of the squad that won the Copa Libertadores in 1978. The 1977–78 season also saw the club win the Liberty Cup and the Intercontinental Cup.

He played for Real Madrid Castilla during the 1978–79 season, returning to Boca for 1979–80. This was followed by a spell at Loma Negra, where his 11 goals in the 1983 Nacional championship earned him top scorer honours.

He also played for San Lorenzo, where Rubén Cousillas was a goalkeeper and trainer, and later with Real Murcia, Estudiantes de La Plata and New York Cosmos, where he had a brief spell with the exhibition side of 1985.

He moved to CD Málaga and saw the club win promotion to the Spanish First Division in 1987–88. After three years at Malaga, he moved to CD Tenerife and saw the club also achieve promotion. This was followed by two seasons at Cádiz CF.

Husillos then played for Cartagena FC, returning to CD Málaga during the 1991–92 season. After a spell at CD Cieza, he ended his career at Málaga club Atlético Malagueño in 1993–94.

== Managerial career ==
Husillos served as director of youth football at Deportivo Morón, before moving to Tigre, where he was assistant coach. He returned to Morón as head coach, and then moved to Almagro, earning his first managerial appointment after a year as a trainer. He guided the club to promotion from the Primera B Nacional to the Argentine Primera. He resigned ten games into the Apertura 2000 tournament.

After spells at Unión Central in Bolivia as head coach, a return to Almagro as coach, and then Real Murcia as athletic director and coach, he joined Al-Ittihad Jeddah in Saudi Arabia as director of football for the 2008–09 season.

He managed Málaga B between 2006 and 2007.

In August 2012, Husillos joined Málaga CF, then managed by Manuel Pellegrini, as sporting director, with a contract that ran until June 2013. In December 2013, he returned for a second spell in the role.

He returned to Málaga, again as sporting director, in October 2017. He came in for criticism for his transfer selections in a season that ended in relegation to the Segunda Division. He left the role on 8 June 2018. The following week, he was appointed director of football for English Premier League club West Ham United. Following the sacking of Manuel Pellegrini in December 2019, Husillos also left the club.

== Outside football ==
Husillos has worked as a commentator for Punto Radio and written a column for Marca.
