= Loma Negra de Olavarría =

Argentine football club

Loma Negra
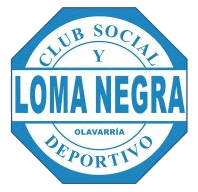
- Full name: Club Social y Deportivo Loma Negra
- Nicknames: Loma (Knoll), Celeste (Light blue)
- Founded: 31 May 1929; 96 years ago
- Ground: Estadio Loma Negra
- Chairman: Walter Bahl
- Manager: Luciano Bilbao
- League: Liga de Fútbol de Olavarría
- 2021: 3rd
- Website: https://clublomanegra.com.ar/
Home colours	Away colours

Club Social y Deportivo Loma Negra (usually known as Loma Negra) is an Argentine sports club based in Olavarría, Buenos Aires Province. The team currently plays in the Liga de Fútbol de Olavarría. The club was established and owned by the homonymous cement company in 1929.

The club played at the highest level of Argentine football (Primera División) on two occasions, having qualified to play the Nacional championships of 1981 and 1983. In 1981 Loma Negra was eliminated in the first round although the team had achieved a 1–0 win over Ferro Carril Oeste and two 0–0 ties with the favorite River Plate.

In 1982 Loma Negra played a friendly match against the touring team of the Soviet Union, who had played out a draw against Argentina in that same tour. Loma Negra defeated the USSR 1–0, in a massive upset.

In 1983 the club progressed to the last sixteen stage of the competition and their striker Armando Husillos was the tournament top scorer with 11 goals.

The club have had little success since their heyday in the early 1980s and now plays at amateur level.

== Titles ==
- Liga de Fútbol de Olavarría (9): 1949, 1966, 1975, 1978, 1980, 1982, 1984, 1991

== Notable players ==
- (Argentina) Félix Orte
- (Argentina) Armando Husillos
- (Argentina) Osvaldo Rinaldi
- (Argentina) Pedro Magallanes
- (Argentina) Miguel Lemme

== Notable managers ==
- (Argentina) Rogelio Domínguez
- (Argentina) Roberto Saporiti
