= Carlos Biasutto =

Argentine footballer and manager

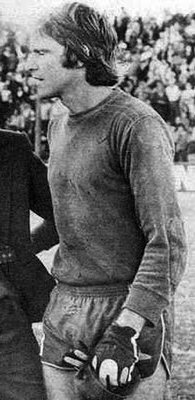

Personal information
- Full name: Carlos Ángel Biasutto
- Date of birth: February 22, 1946 (age 80)
- Place of birth: Buenos Aires, Argentina
- Position: Goalkeeper

Youth career
- 1963–1965: Atlanta

Senior career*
Years	Team	Apps	(Gls)
1965–1968	Atlanta	117	(0)
1969–1975	Rosario Central	189	(0)
1975–1976	Boca Juniors	26	(0)
1977–1978	Millonarios		
1978–1979	Unión	55	(0)
1980–1986	Platense	249	(0)
- * Club domestic league appearances and goals as of 00:24, 2 February 2010 (UTC)

Carlos Biasutto (born 22 February 1946 in Buenos Aires) is an Argentine retired football goalkeeper and manager.

== Playing career ==
Biasutto joined the youth team of Atlanta in 1963 and made his official league debut on 12 September 1965 in a 1–1 home draw against Huracán. He went on to make 121 appearances in all competitions for Atlanta.

Biasutto joined Rosario Central in 1969 and made his debut in a 2–2 draw against his former club Atlanta on 11 May 1969. He was the reserve goalkeeper in the side that won the Nacional championship of 1971 and the first team goalkeeper for Nacional 1973. He played 20 games for Central in the Copa Libertadores tournaments of 1972, 1974 and 1975. After 189 league games for Central Biasutto left the club to join Boca Juniors in 1975.

Biasutto played for Boca Juniors between 1975 and 1976, his debut for the club came in a 1–2 home defeat to fierce rivals River Plate on 21 September 1975. He went on to make 26 league appearances for Boca and was part of the team that won the Metropolitano championship in 1976.

Between 1977 and 1978, Biasutto played for the Colombian side Millonarios. In 1978, Biasutto returned to Argentina to play for Unión de Santa Fe where he played until the end of the 1979 season, making 55 league appearances for the club.

In 1980, he joined Platense where he played 247 league games making him the fourth most capped Platense player in the history of the club and the Platense player who made the most top flight appearances for the club. He is remembered as one of the great icons of the club.

Biasutto retired as a player in 1986 having amassed 656 Primera División appearances, putting him in fourth place on the all-time list behind Hugo Gatti, Carlos Fernando Navarro Montoya and Ricardo Bochini.

== Honours ==
Rosario Central

- Primera División: Nacional 1971, Nacional 1973

Boca Juniors

- Primera División: Metropolitano 1976

== Managerial career ==
Following his retirement Biasutto became a fitness coach and eventually progressed to become a manager. He has had three stints as manager of Club Atlético Belgrano and has also managed Atlético de Rafaela in Argentina. He has had three stints as manager of Blooming in Bolivia and has also managed Wilstermann and Aurora as well as Melgar of Peru.
