= Club Atlético Argentino (Firmat) =

Argentine football club

Argentino de Firmat
- Full name: Club Atlético Argentino (Firmat)
- Nickname: Cuevero
- Founded: August 1 1922
- Ground: Estadio Félix Oriola, Firmat, Santa Fe Province
- Capacity: 1000

Club Atlético Argentino, usually known as Argentino de Firmat, is an Argentine football club based in the city of Firmat in Santa Fe Province. The team is noted for playing in the Argentina first division in 1985, when it took part in the Nacional Championship.

The club currently plays in its home football league: Liga Deportiva del Sur of Santa Fe Province.
