= Miguel Lemme =

Argentine footballer (born 1953)

Personal information
- Full name: Miguel Ángel Lemme
- Date of birth: 4 April 1953 (age 73)
- Place of birth: Buenos Aires, Argentina
- Height: 1.74 m (5 ft 9 in)
- Position: Centre-back

Senior career*
Years	Team	Apps	(Gls)
1974–1976	Talleres de Remedios de Escalada		
1976–1978	Flandria		
1979–1980	Tigre		
1980	Unión	12	(0)
1981	Tigre		
1981	Loma Negra	8	(0)
1982	Estudiantes	38	(0)
1983–1986	Argentinos Juniors	109	(1)
1987	Talleres	2	(0)
1988	Olimpo		
1988	Estudiantes de Caseros		
- * Club domestic league appearances and goals

Miguel Ángel Lemme (born 4 April 1953) is an Argentine former professional footballer who played as a centre-back. During his career, he was a member of the Argentinos Juniors team that won the 1985 Copa Libertadores.

== Career ==
In 1982, Lemme joined "Estudiantes de La Plata", where he found success under the guidance of Carlos Salvador Bilardo. He became champion of the "Metropolitano" and established himself as a midfielder.

After leaving Estudiantes, Lemme joined Argentinos Juniors in 1983, where he was member of the teams that won two local titles and one continental title, 1985 Copa Libertadores. In this competition, he played seven matches and scored a goal against Fluminense at the Maracaná.

Lemme was the technical assistant to Diego Maradona during Maradona's time as coach of the Argentine national team.

== Honours ==
Tigre

- Primera B Metropolitana: 1979

Estudiantes de La Plata

- Argentine Primera División: M-1982

Argentinos Juniors

- Argentine Primera División: M-1984, M-1985
- Copa Libertadores: 1985
