= 1985 Argentine Primera División =

94th season of top-tier football league in Argentina

Primera División
- Season: 1985
- Champions: Argentinos Juniors (Nacional)

The 1985 Argentine Primera División was the 94th season of top-flight football in Argentina. The season began on February 17 and ended on September 4.

This tournament featured the last edition of the Nacional championship. The structure of the tournament made it the most complicated championship in the history of Primera División. The eventual champions were Argentinos Juniors who beat Vélez Sársfield in a 2nd final.

== Nacional Championship ==
Nacional
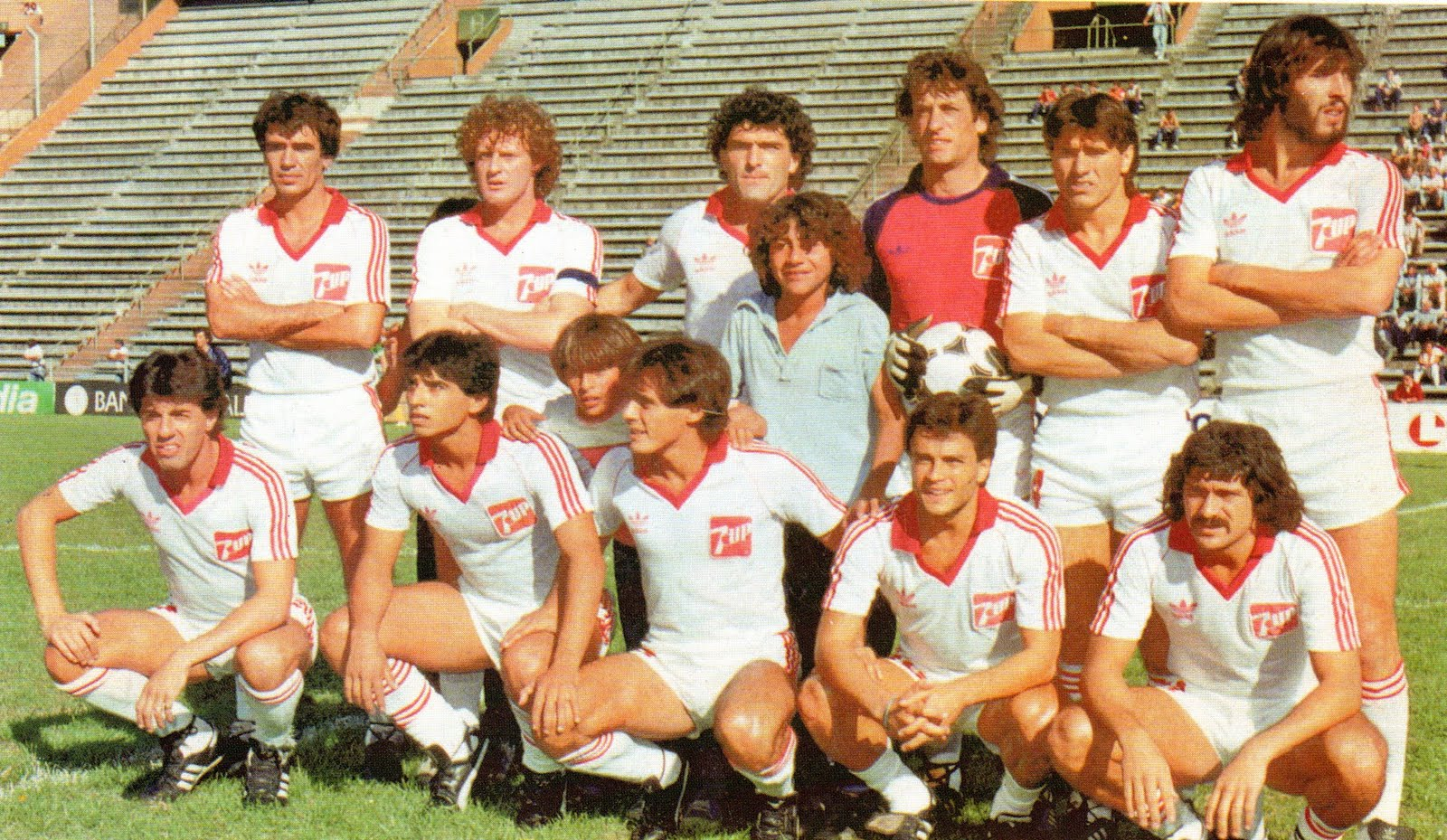
- Argentinos Jrs, Nacional champions
- Season: 1985
- Champions: Argentinos Juniors (2nd title)
- Promoted: Dep. Español; Gimnasia y Esgrima LP
- Top goalscorer: (Argentina) Jorge Comas (12 goals)

=== Group Stages (1st step) ===
The top two teams go through to the winners knockout, the bottom two go to the losers knockout.

==== Group A ====
Pos	Team	Pld	W	D	L	GF	GA	GD	Pts
1	Estudiantes (LP)	6	4	1	1	12	4	+8	9
2	Ramón Santamarina	6	2	1	3	5	6	−1	5
3	Racing (C)	6	2	1	3	5	8	−3	5
4	Platense	6	2	1	3	5	9	−4	5

==== Group B ====
Pos	Team	Pld	W	D	L	GF	GA	GD	Pts
1	Boca Juniors	6	3	2	1	13	6	+7	8
2	Estudiantes (RC)	6	3	1	2	12	12	0	7
3	Temperley	6	2	1	3	8	11	−3	5
4	Altos Hornos Zapla	6	2	0	4	5	9	−4	4

==== Group C ====
Pos	Team	Pld	W	D	L	GF	GA	GD	Pts
1	Independiente	6	3	1	2	11	6	+5	7
2	Talleres (C)	6	3	1	2	6	6	0	7
3	Guaraní Antonio Franco	6	3	1	2	6	8	−2	7
4	Huracán	6	0	3	3	7	10	−3	3

==== Group D ====
Pos	Team	Pld	W	D	L	GF	GA	GD	Pts
1	River Plate	6	4	2	0	10	4	+6	10
2	Unión	6	1	3	2	9	6	+3	5
3	Gimnasia y Esgrima (LP)	6	1	3	2	4	10	−6	5
4	Cipolletti	6	0	4	2	5	8	−3	4

==== Group E ====
Pos	Team	Pld	W	D	L	GF	GA	GD	Pts
1	Newell's Old Boys	6	2	4	0	9	6	+3	8
2	San Lorenzo	6	2	3	1	10	5	+5	7
3	Huracán Las Heras	6	2	3	1	8	8	0	7
4	Círculo Deportivo	6	1	0	5	6	14	−8	2

==== Group F ====
Pos	Team	Pld	W	D	L	GF	GA	GD	Pts
1	Argentinos Juniors	6	3	3	0	16	5	+11	9
2	Chacarita Juniors	6	3	1	2	11	6	+5	7
3	Central Norte	6	1	3	2	4	14	−10	5
4	Belgrano	6	0	3	3	8	14	−6	3

==== Group G ====
Pos	Team	Pld	W	D	L	GF	GA	GD	Pts
1	San Martín (T)	6	3	2	1	12	4	+8	8
2	Vélez Sársfield	6	2	3	1	11	6	+5	7
3	Argentino (F)	6	2	1	3	5	10	−5	5
4	Juventud Alianza	6	1	1	4	4	12	−8	3

==== Group H ====
Pos	Team	Pld	W	D	L	GF	GA	GD	Pts
1	Ferro Carril Oeste	6	4	1	1	8	2	+6	9
2	Deportivo Español	6	3	1	2	9	6	+3	7
3	Instituto	6	3	0	3	9	9	0	6
4	Juventud Antoniana	6	1	0	5	4	13	−9	2

=== 2nd step ===
==== Winners knockout ====
The winners progressed to the winners QF, the losers enter the losers 3rd round.

Home (1st leg)	Home (2nd leg)	1st Leg	2nd leg	Aggregate
Independiente	Ramón Santamarina	3-1	3-2	6-3
Talleres (C)	Estudiantes (LP)	1-1	1-3	2-4
Newell's Old Boys	Chacarita Juniors	0-0	2-1	2-1
San Lorenzo	Argentinos Juniors	2-2	0-1	2-3
San Martín (T)	Estudiantes (RC)	4-2	0-0	4-2
Boca Juniors	Vélez Sársfield	3-2	0-3	3-4
Ferro Carril Oeste	Unión	1-0	2-1	3-1
Deportivo Español	River Plate	2-1	0-5	2-6

==== Losers knockout ====
Home (1st leg)	Home (2nd leg)	1st Leg	2nd leg	Aggregate
Guaraní	Platense	0-0	0-1	0-1
Huracán	Racing (C)	2-1	1-1	3-2
Belgrano	Huracán La Heras	2-1	1-3	3-4
Central Norte	Círculo Deportivo	0-0	3-2	3-2
Altos Hornos Zapla	Argentino (F)	2-0	1-2	3-2
Juventud Alianza	Temperley	4-3	1-4	5-7
Cipolletti	Instituto	0-0	1-3	1-3
Gimnasia y Esgrima (LP)	Juventud Antoniana	3-0	0-1	3-1

=== 3rd step ===
Winners Quarter-finals

		Score
San Martín	Argentinos Juniors	0-2
Ferro Carril Oeste	Independiente	3-0
River Plate	Estudiantes (LP)	2-0
Newell's Old Boys	Vélez Sársfield	1-2 (aet)

Losers 3rd round

		Score
Estudiantes (RC)	Temperley	0-1
Gimnasia La Plata	Deportivo Español	0-2
Unión	Platense	3-0
Talleres	Instituto	0-4
Boca Juniors	Altos Hornos Zapla	3-1
Huracán La Heras	San Lorenzo	3-3 (2-3 p)
Chacarita Juniors	Huracán	0-0 (4-3 p)
Central Norte	Ramón Santamarina	1-1 (4-2 p)

=== 4th step ===
Winners Semi-finals

		Score
Ferro Carril Oeste	Argentinos Juniors	0-3
Vélez Sársfield	River Plate	3-0

Losers 4th round

		Score
Independiente	Boca Juniors	1-0
Newell's Old Boys	Temperley	2-1
Chacarita Juniors	San Lorenzo	2-0 (aet)
Estuidaintes (LP)	Deportivo Español	1-1 (6-5 p)
Central Norte	Unión	0-0 (1-3 p)
San Martín	Instituto	0-0 (4-1 p)

=== 5th step ===
Winners final

Home (1st leg)	Home (2nd leg)	1st Leg	2nd leg	Aggregate
Argentinos Juniors	Vélez Sársfield	2-0	0-2	2-2 (4-3 p)

- Argentinos Juniors to play in the final
- Vélez Sársfield progress to the losers final

Losers 5th round

		Score
Newell's Old Boys	Chacarita Juniors	1-0
Estudiantes (LP)	San Martín	1-0
River Plate	Unión	1-0
Ferro Carril Oeste	Independiente	0-0 (2-4 p)

=== 6th step ===
Losers 6th round

		Score
River Plate	Estudiantes (LP)	4-1
Independiente	Newell's Old Boys	0-2

=== 7th step ===
Losers 7th round

		Score
River Plate	Newell's Old Boys	2-0

=== 8th step ===
Losers final

		Score
Vélez Sársfield	River Plate	2-1

- Vélez Sársfield to play in the final

=== Final ===
August 28, 1985

Home	Away	Score
Argentinos Juniors	Vélez Sársfield	1-1 (3-4 p)

- As Argentinos Juniors had made it to the final without losing a game, the final had to be replayed to give them the 2nd chance that every other team had already had.

September 3, 1985

Home	Away	Score
Vélez Sársfield	Argentinos Juniors	1-2

== See also ==
- 1985–86 in Argentine football
