= Roberto Saporiti =

Argentine footballer and manager

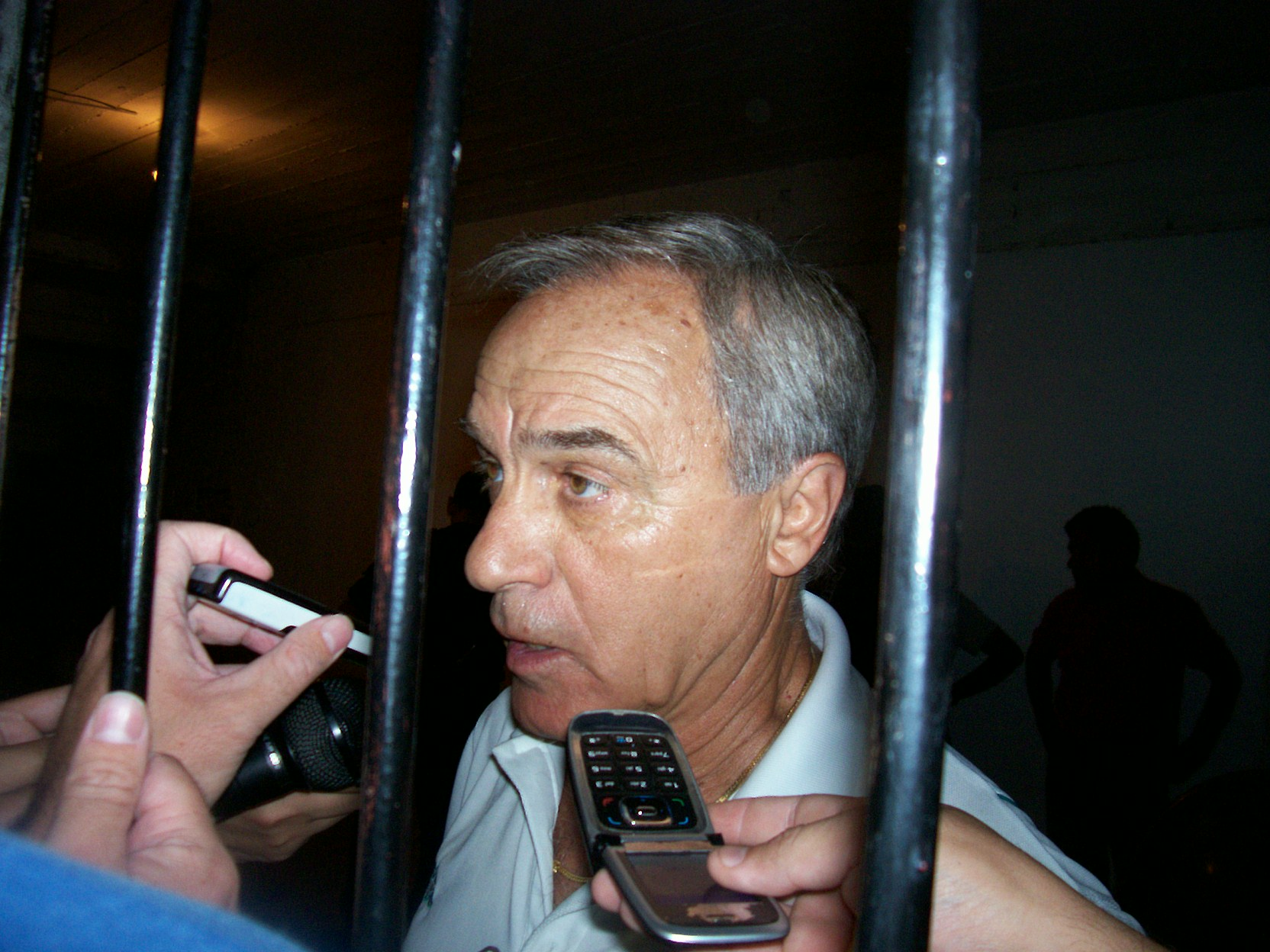
- Saporiti in 2009

Personal information
- Full name: Roberto Marcos Saporiti
- Date of birth: 11 April 1939 (age 87)
- Place of birth: Buenos Aires, Argentina
- Position: Striker

Senior career*
Years	Team	Apps	(Gls)
1957–1961	Independiente	16	(3)
1962–1963	Lanús	34	(14)
1963–1964	Deportivo Español	42	(16)
1965	Unión La Calera	24	(8)
1966	Millonarios		
1966	Independiente Medellín		
1967	Santiago Morning	24	(13)
1968	Racing Montevideo		
1968	Atlético Mineiro	1	(0)
1968–1969	Monterrey		
1969–1970	Belenenses	39	(13)
1971	Platense	10	(1)
1971–1972	Limoges FC		
1972–1974	KSV Oudenaarde		

Managerial career
- 1975: Estudiantes de Buenos Aires
- 1977–1979: Talleres de Córdoba
- 1980: Rosario Central
- 1981: Loma Negra
- 1984: Argentinos Juniors
- 1985: Atlético Junior
- 1986: Argentinos Juniors
- 1987: Boca Juniors
- 1987–1988: Lanús
- 1988: Talleres de Córdoba
- 1989–1990: San Lorenzo
- 1991–1994: Necaxa
- 1994: León
- 1995: Talleres de Córdoba
- 1995–1996: Argentinos Juniors
- 1998: Celaya
- 1998–1999: Pumas
- 1999: Tecos
- 2000: Atlante
- 2003–2004: Olimpo
- 2005: Puebla
- 2006: Talleres de Córdoba
- 2007–2008: Olimpo
- 2009: Defensa y Justicia
- 2009: Talleres de Córdoba
- 2014: UAI Urquiza
- * Club domestic league appearances and goals

Roberto Marcos Saporiti (born 11 April 1939) is an Argentine retired football player and manager. He played as a striker. As a manager, he managed clubs in Argentina, Mexico and Colombia.

== Playing career ==
Born in Buenos Aires, Saporiti started his professional career with Club Atlético Independiente in 1957. In 1960 he was part of the squad that won the Primera División Argentina championship.

In 1962 he moved down a division to play for Club Atlético Lanús and in 1963 he moved to Deportivo Español where he played alongside Carlos Bilardo.

From 1965 to 1970, Saporiti played abroad before returning to Argentina in 1971 to play for Club Atlético Platense. In Chile, he played for Unión La Calera and Santiago Morning. In Uruguay, he had a spell with Racing Club de Montevideo. In Colombia, he played for Millonarios and Independiente Medellín. He also played for Atlético Mineiro in Brazil, Monterrey in Mexico and Belenenses in Portugal.

He ended his career with Limoges FC in France and KSV Oudenaarde in Belgium.

== Managerial career ==
Saporiti has held managerial positions at a large number of clubs. Most notably he coached Argentinos Juniors to their first ever title in 1984, he has had five spells as manager of Talleres de Córdoba (1977–1979, 1988, 1995, 2006 and 2009) and he coached Loma Negra in the early 1980s, the most successful period in their history. He has also coached Argentine clubs Chacarita Juniors, Rosario Central, San Lorenzo and had a spell as caretaker manager of Boca Juniors. Between 2007 and 2008 he had a second spell as manager of Olimpo de Bahía Blanca.

Saporiti has also coached Junior in Colombia and a number of clubs in Mexico including Veracruz, Atlante, Pumas, Necaxa, Tecos UAG and Puebla.

== Honours ==
=== Player ===
Independiente

- Primera División Argentina: Primera División Argentina

=== Managers ===
Argentinos Juniors

- Metropolitano: 1984
