= Estadio La Boutique =

Football stadium in Córdoba, Argentina

Francisco Cabasés Stadium
- Estadio Francisco Cabasés
- La Boutique de Barrio Jardín
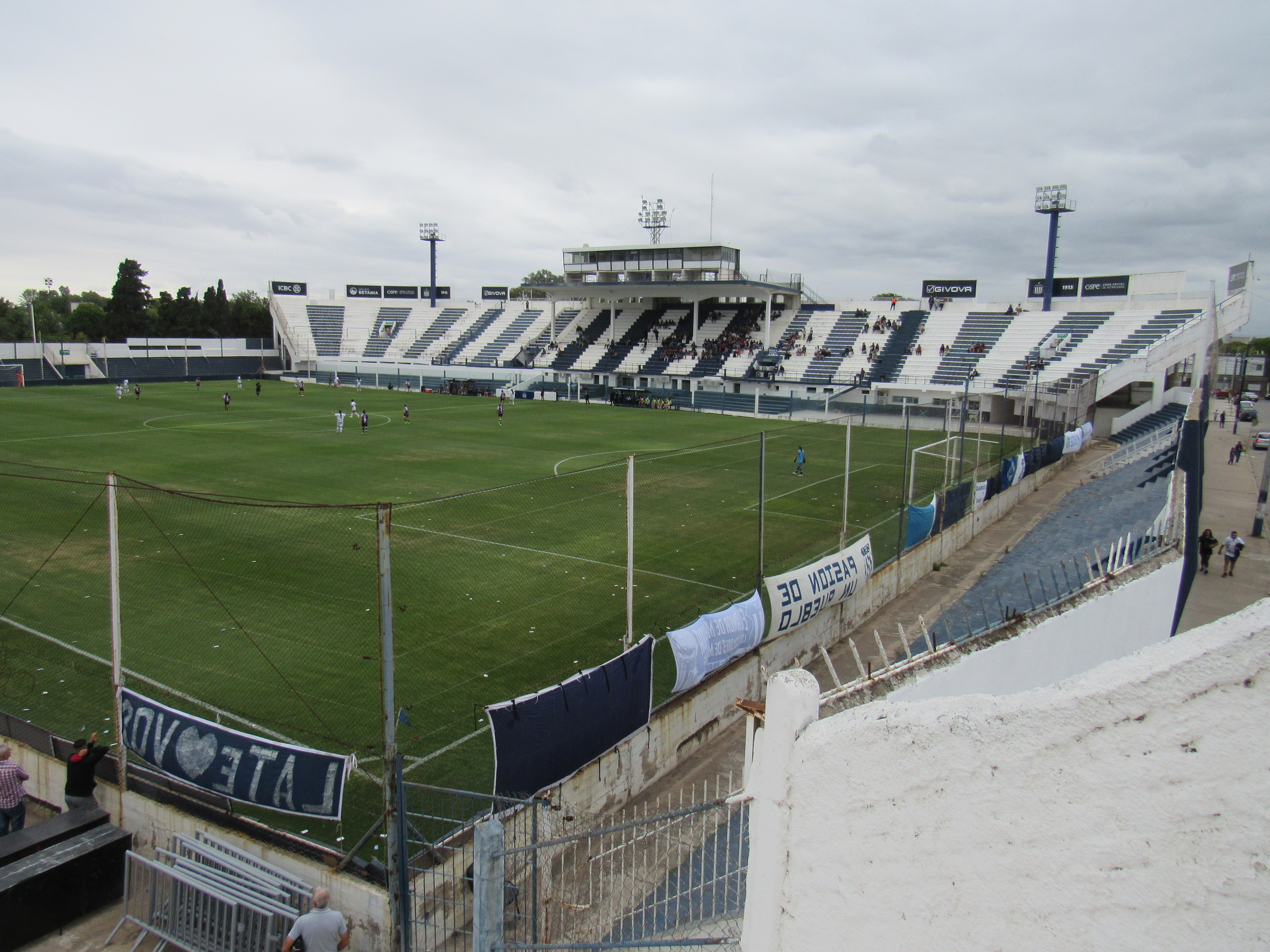
- The stadium in 2023
- Interactive map of Francisco Cabasés Stadium
- Address: Av. Pablo Ricchieri 3195; Córdoba; Argentina
- Owner: C.A. Talleres
- Capacity: 13,000
- Type: Stadium
- Surface: Grass
- Field size: 101 x 65 m

Construction
- Opened: 12 October 1931; 94 years ago
- Renovated: 2008
- Expanded: 1944, 1951
- Cost: m$n70,000
- Architects: S. Allende Posse; Agenor Villagra

Tenant
- C.A. Talleres (1956–present)

Estadio Francisco Cabasés (popularly known as La Boutique de Barrio Jardín) is a football stadium located in the city of Córdoba in homonymous province of Argentina. It is owned and operated by C.A. Talleres, having been opened in 1931. The stadium has capacity for 13,000 spectators.

The stadium was named after Francisco Paco Cabasés (1916–2019), regarded as one of the most representative supporters of Talleres de Córdoba, who was also player and (after his retirement from football) worked at the club in several assignments including coach assistant and recruiter for young talents. Cabasés died at 102 years old from a pneumonia.

== History ==
The first home matches of Talleres were held in Barrio Inglés (Barrio Pueyrredón since the 1940s). In 1915, the club moved to play to a venue located on Barrio Inglés, where the Forja Convention Center" stands nowadays.

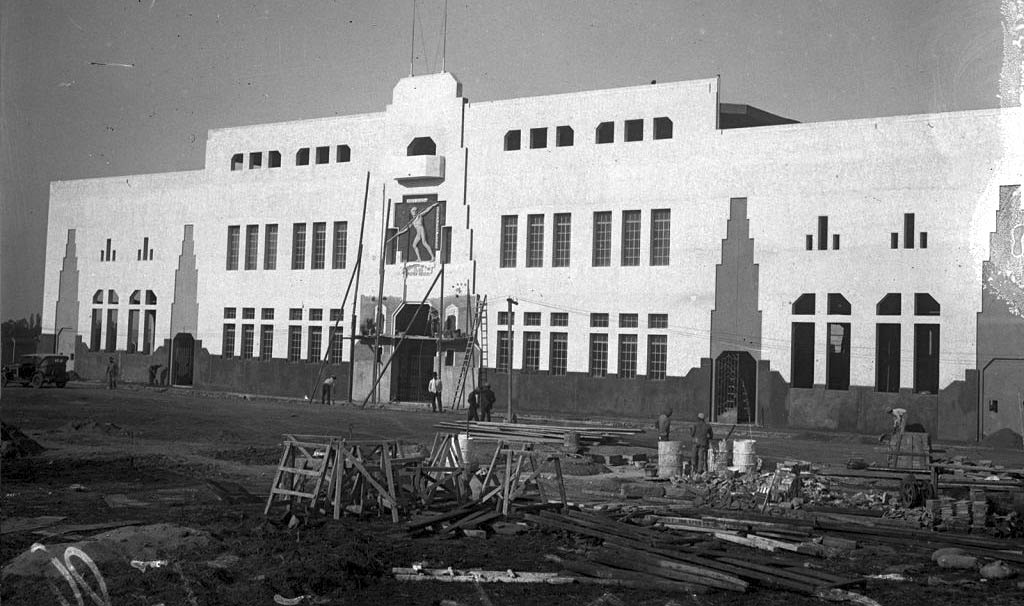
The stadium under construction, c. 1931

In 1931 the club started searching for a land to build its own stadium. Francisco Espinosa donated a land in Barrio Jardín, and the project was carried out by two engineers, S. Allende Posse and Agenor Villagra. Thanks to the donations from club members and investors, the club built a small stadium with two grandstand (capacity of 5,000), locker rooms, and toilettes, at a cost of m$n70,000.

The stadium –built in art deco style– was inaugurated on 12 October 1931, in a friendly match vs Uruguayan club Rampla Juniors. The club president was Alberto Bernis Sales. In 1944 the club expanded the granstands, and 7 years later the stalls were put, increasing the stadium capacity up to 13,000 people.

At the end of the 1970s and during the presidency of Amadeo Nuccetelli, Talleres started playing their home matches at Estadio Chateau Carreras due to its bigger capacity and the increasing attendance to Talleres' games. That contributed to the progressive deterioration of the venue to such an extent that it was considered unable to host professional events. In March 2008 La Boutique was refurbished and subsecquently allowed to host football matches organised by the AFA. The last match played had been in 2003.

Nevertheless, Talleres returned to Estadio Córdoba to host their home matches in 2012. In 2023, the club announced that the stadium facade would be decorated by a painting by local artist TEG (b. 1975), who is also a Talleres fan and has painted several murals in Brazil, where he resides.

== In other media ==
Contestants of the 36th season of the American reality show The Amazing Race had to play bubble soccer in the field of Estadio La Boutique as part of their challenges in Córdoba.
