= Nacional championship =

Football tournament in Argentina

Campeonato Nacional
- Organiser(s): AFA
- Founded: 1967
- Abolished: 1985; 41 years ago
- Region: Argentina
- Teams: 32 (1985)
- Qualifier for: Copa Libertadores
- Related competitions: Metropolitano
- Most championships: Independiente; Rosario Central; Boca Juniors; River Plate; (3 titles each)

The Campeonato Nacional was one of the two football tournaments that formed the Primera División season (along with the Metropolitano championship) since 1967. The Nacional championship was played annually until its last edition in 1985.

The Nacional took place in the second half of the year while the Metropolitano took place in the first half of the year. Nacional winners, and often the runners-up, qualified for the following year Copa Libertadores.

== History ==
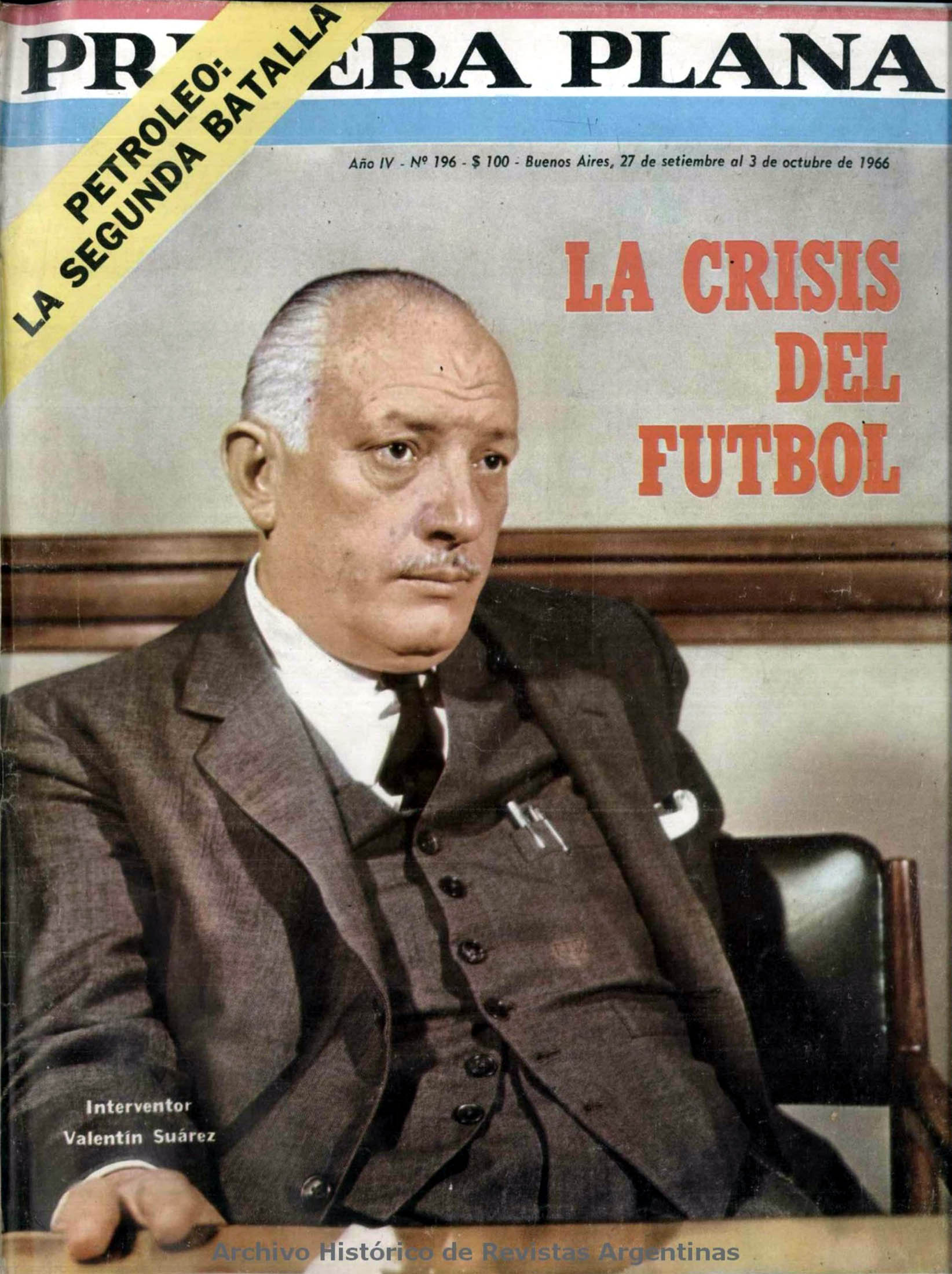
President of AFA, Valentín Suárez (pictured) was the main promoter to the creation of a nacional championship that included clubs from regional leagues

The Nacional championship was created by an initiative of then president of Argentine Football Association, Valentín Suárez, with the purpose of adding clubs outside Buenos Aires that competed in regional leagues. Teams best placed in "Torneo Regional" (created in 1967 as well) were eligible to play the Campeonato Nacional.

The first edition comprised 12 teams from the Metropolitano and four regional qualifiers, and was won by Independiente.

The Nacional was played with a number of different formats including the basic league table, two groups qualifying to semi-finals and four groups qualifying to a final group, round of 16 or quarter finals. The last Nacional in 1985 featured an extremely complicated set-up, when after the first stage finished, teams were divided into two groups ("winners" and "losers") while the 3rd and 4th of each group were moved to the round of losers. playing a new tournament that qualified one of each group to the finals, which were played under a sporting advantage system that favored Argentinos Juniors.

The number of participants varied between a low of 16 (1967 and 1968) and a high of 36 (1974). The last edition of Campeonato Nacional was contested by 32 clubs.

After the restructuring in the Argentine football league system in 1985 that created the Primera B Nacional, the Nacional and Metropolitano championship were abolished, being replaced by a unique competition with a European style format. The first edition was held in 1985–86.

== List of Champions ==
Notes

- – single match in neutral venue
- – final score on goal difference

Ed.	Year	Champion	Runner-up	First leg / single match		Second leg		Aggr.
Ed.	Year	Champion	Runner-up	Res.	Venue	Res.	Venue	Aggr.
1	1967	Independiente (1)	Estudiantes (LP)	– (Note: Defined on points.)				
2	1968	Vélez Sársfield (1)	River Plate	–				
3	1969	Boca Juniors (1)	River Plate	–				
4	1970	Boca Juniors (2)	Rosario Central	2–1	Monumental	–		
5	1971	Rosario Central (1)	San Lorenzo	2–1	Estado Newell's	–		
6	1972	San Lorenzo (1)	River Plate	1–0	Estadio Vélez	–		
7	1973	Rosario Central (2)	Monumental	–				
8	1974	San Lorenzo (2)	Rosario Central	–				
9	1975	River Plate (1)	Estudiantes (LP)	–				
10	1976	Boca Juniors (3)	River Plate	1–0	Estadio Racing	–		
11	1977	Independiente (2)	Talleres (C)	1–1	La Doble Visera	2–2	Barrio Jardín	3–3 (Note: Won on away goals rule.)
12	1978	Independiente (3)	River Plate	0–0	Monumental	2–0	Independiente	2–0
13	1979	River Plate (2)	Unión	1–1	Estadio 15 de Abril	0–0	Monumental	1–1
14	1980	Rosario Central (3)	Racing (C)	5–1	Gigante de Arroyito	0–2	Chateau Carreras	5–3
15	1981	River Plate (3)	Ferro Carril Oeste	1–0	Monumental	1–0	Estadio Ferro	2–0
16	1982	Ferro Carril Oeste (1)	Quilmes	0–0	Estadio Quilmes	2–0	Estadio Ferro	2–0
17	1983	Estudiantes (LP) (1)	Independiente	2–0	Estadio J. Hirschi	1–2	La Doble Visera	3–2
18	1984	Ferro Carril Oeste (2)	River Plate	3–0	Monumental	1–0	Estadio Ferro	4–0
19	1985	Argentinos Juniors (1)	Vélez Sársfield	1–1 (3–4 p)	Monumental	2–1	Monumental	2–1 (Note: As Argentinos Juniors had been won their group stage, they won the championship in the second leg on sporting advantage.)

== Titles by club ==
Club	Titles	Years won
Independiente	3	1967, 1977, 1978
Rosario Central	3	1971, 1973, 1980
Boca Juniors	3	1969, 1970, 1976
River Plate	3	1975, 1979, 1981
San Lorenzo	2	1972, 1974
Ferro Carril Oeste	2	1982, 1984
Vélez Sársfield	1	1968
Estudiantes (LP)	1	1983
Argentinos Juniors	1	1985

== See also ==
- Argentine Primera División
- Metropolitano championship
- Apertura and Clausura
