= 1998–99 Primera B Nacional =

13th season of the second-tier football league in Argentina

Primera B Nacional
- Season: 1998–99
- Champions: Instituto (1st divisional title)
- Promoted: Instituto; Chacarita Juniors
- Relegated: Atlanta; Douglas Haig; Estudiantes (BA); Huracán Corrientes
- Top goalscorer: Adrián Czornomaz 26 goals

The 1998–99 Argentine Primera B Nacional was the 13th season of second division professional of football in Argentina. A total of 33 teams competed; the champion and runner-up were promoted to Argentine Primera División.

== Club information ==
=== Interior Zone ===
Club	City	Stadium
Aldosivi	Mar del Plata	José María Minella
Almirante Brown	Arrecifes	Estadio Municipal
Atlético de Rafaela	Rafaela	Nuevo Monumental
Atlético Tucumán	San Miguel de Tucumán	Monumental Presidente Jose Fierro
Cipolletti	Cipolletti	La Visera de Cemento
Douglas Haig	Pergamino	Miguel Morales
Gimnasia y Esgrima	Concepción del Uruguay	Manuel y Ramón Núñez
Gimnasia y Tiro	Salta	Gigante del Norte
Godoy Cruz	Mendoza	Malvinas Argentinas
Huracán Corrientes	Corrientes	José Antonio Romero Feris
Instituto	Córdoba	Presidente Perón
Juventud Antoniana	Salta	Fray Honorato Pistoia
Olimpo	Bahía Blanca	Roberto Natalio Carminatti
San Martín	Mendoza	San Martín
San Martín	San Juan	Ing. Hilario Sánchez
San Martín	San Miguel de Tucumán	La Ciudadela

=== Metropolitana Zone ===
Club	City	Stadium
All Boys	Floresta	Islas Malvinas
Almagro	José Ingenieros	Tres de Febrero
Arsenal	Sarandí	Julio H. Grondona
Atlanta	Villa Crespo	León Kolbovski
Banfield	Banfield	Florencio Solá
Central Córdoba	Rosario	Gabino Sosa
Chacarita Juniors	Villa Maipú	Chacarita Juniors
Defensa y Justicia	Florencio Varela	Norberto "Tito" Tomaghello
Deportivo Español	Parque Avellaneda	Nueva España
Deportivo Morón	Morón	Francisco Urbano
El Porvenir	Gerli	Gildo Francisco Ghersinich
Estudiantes	Caseros	Ciudad de Caseros
Los Andes	Lomas de Zamora	Eduardo Gallardón
Nueva Chicago	Mataderos	Nueva Chicago
Quilmes	Quilmes	Centenario
San Miguel	Los Polvorines	Malvinas Argentinas
Tigre	Victoria	José Dellagiovanna

== Interior Zone standings ==
Pos	Team	Pld	W	D	L	GF	GA	GD	Pts	Qualification
1	Instituto	30	17	6	7	57	30	+27	57	Promotion Playoff
2	Atlético Tucumán	30	17	6	7	55	29	+26	57	Promotion Playoff
3	Cipolletti	30	15	8	7	56	45	+11	53	Second Promotion Playoff
4	Juventud Antoniana	30	13	7	10	44	33	+11	46	Second Promotion Playoff
5	San Martín (T)	30	13	7	10	43	48	−5	46	Second Promotion Playoff
6	Atlético de Rafaela	30	12	8	10	45	36	+9	44	Second Promotion Playoff
7	Olimpo	30	11	10	9	43	44	−1	43	Second Promotion Playoff
8	Almirante Brown (A)	30	12	6	12	42	41	+1	42	Second Promotion Playoff
9	Aldosivi	30	12	6	12	39	41	−2	42	Second Promotion Playoff
10	San Martín (M)	30	10	8	12	36	42	−6	38	Second Promotion Playoff
11	Gimnasia y Esgrima (CdU)	30	10	7	13	41	41	0	37	Second Promotion Playoff
12	San Martín (SJ)	30	8	12	10	29	35	−6	36	Second Promotion Playoff
13	Gimnasia y Tiro	30	8	10	12	37	45	−8	34	Second Promotion Playoff
14	Godoy Cruz	30	8	6	16	34	54	−20	30	Second Promotion Playoff
15	Huracán Corrientes	30	7	8	15	29	47	−18	29	
16	Douglas Haig	30	6	7	17	37	56	−19	25	

== Metropolitana Zone Standings ==
Pos	Team	Pld	W	D	L	GF	GA	GD	Pts	Qualification
1	Chacarita Juniors	32	19	6	7	50	28	+22	63	Promotion Playoff
2	Arsenal	32	16	9	7	52	36	+16	57	Promotion Playoff
3	All Boys	32	14	9	9	46	40	+6	51	Second Promotion Playoff
4	Quilmes	32	12	11	9	51	46	+5	47	Second Promotion Playoff
5	El Porvenir	32	12	9	11	50	49	+1	45	Second Promotion Playoff
6	Nueva Chicago	32	11	11	10	45	39	+6	44	Second Promotion Playoff
7	Defensa y Justicia	32	10	14	8	44	39	+5	44	Second Promotion Playoff
8	Tigre	32	10	13	9	45	41	+4	43	Second Promotion Playoff
9	San Miguel	32	11	10	11	30	27	+3	43	Second Promotion Playoff
10	Central Córdoba (R)	32	10	13	9	43	41	+2	43	Second Promotion Playoff
11	Deportivo Español	32	11	10	11	47	46	+1	43	Second Promotion Playoff
12	Banfield	32	11	10	11	39	43	−4	43	Second Promotion Playoff
13	Almagro	32	8	12	12	35	50	−15	36	Second Promotion Playoff
14	Atlanta	32	7	14	11	34	43	−9	35 (Note: Didn't qualify for the Second Promotion Playoff as it was involved in relegation.)	
15	Deportivo Morón	32	7	12	13	32	38	−6	33	Second Promotion Playoff
16	Los Andes	32	4	16	12	29	42	−13	28	
17	Estudiantes (BA)	32	4	9	19	31	57	−26	21	

== Promotion Playoff ==
The Promotion Playoff was played by the teams placed 1st and 2nd of each zone. The winning team was declared champion and was automatically promoted to Primera División. The teams that lost in semifinal joined into the Round of 16 of the Second Promotion Playoff, and the team that lost in the final joined in the Quarterfinals of the Second Promotion Playoff.

=== Semifinals ===
Team 1	Agg.	Team 2	1st leg	2nd leg
Semifinals
Instituto^{1}	2-2	Arsenal	1-1	1-1
Semifinals
Chacarita Juniors^{1}	2–2	Atlético Tucumán	0-1	2-1

1: Qualified because of sport advantage.

=== Final ===
==== Match details ====
Championship playoff
12 June 1999
First leg

Instituto (C)	3–0	Chacarita Juniors
Jiménez; Maldonado

Estadio Olímpico, Córdoba

19 June 1999
Second leg

Chacarita Juniors	1–0	Instituto (C)
Abalos	Report

Estadio Monumental, Buenos Aires
Referee: Horacio Elizondo

Team details

Chacarita Juniors
Instituto (C)

GK	1	Jorge Vivaldo
DF	4	Diego Otaño
DF	2	Leonardo Sciaqua
DF	6	Diego Rivero
DF	3	Ricardo Pagés
MF	8	Edgardo Parisi
MF	5	Leonardo Ferrero
MF	10	José A. Garay
FW	7	Daniel A. Fernández
FW	9	Silvio Carrario
FW	11	Luciano Ábalos
Manager:
(Argentina) Héctor Rivoira

GK	1	Roberto Cabrera
DF	4	Aníbal Álvarez
DF	2	Ramón Galarza
DF	6	Damián D. Balbuena
DF	3	Diego Alarcón
MF	8	Darío Alaniz
MF	5	Javier López
MF	11	Hernán Buján
MF	10	Claudio Sarría
FW	7	Fernando Castro
FW	9	Daniel Jiménez
Substitutes:
DF		José O. Guerrero	(substituted on) a'
MF		Raúl Maldonado	(substituted on) b'
MF		Silvio Risio	(substituted on) a'
Manager:
(Argentina) Ernesto Corti

Note: Instituto won 3–1 on aggregate, promoting to Primera División

== Second Promotion Playoff ==
The Second Promotion Playoff or Torneo Reducido was played by the teams placed 3rd to 14th of each zone. Arsenal and Atlético Tucumán joined in the Round of 16, and Chacarita Juniors joined in the Quarterfinals. The winner was promoted to Primera División.

First Round
First Leg
Home	Result	Away
San Martín (M)	0 - 2	Olimpo
San Martín (SJ)	2 - 0	San Martín (T)
Banfield	2 - 2	El Porvenir
Gimnasia y Tiro	0 - 1	Juventud Antoniana
Gimnasia y Esgrima (CdU)	0 - 1	Atlético de Rafaela
Almagro	0 - 1	Quilmes
Aldosivi	2 - 0	Almirante Brown (A)
Deportivo Morón	0 - 0	All Boys
Central Córdoba (R)	1 - 5	Defensa y Justicia
Deportivo Español	1 - 1	Nueva Chicago
Godoy Cruz	1 - 1	Cipolletti
San Miguel	0 - 0	Tigre
Second Leg
Olimpo	2 - 1	San Martín (M)
San Martín (T)	4 - 0	San Martín (SJ)
El Porvenir	1 - 0	Banfield
Juventud Antoniana ^{1}	1 - 2	Gimnasia y Tiro
Atlético de Rafaela ^{1}	0 - 1	Gimnasia y Esgrima (CdU)
Quilmes	1 - 0	Almagro
Almirante Brown (A) ^{1}	2 - 0	Aldosivi
All Boys	2 - 1	Deportivo Morón
Defensa y Justicia	1 - 1	Central Córdoba (R)
Nueva Chicago	w/o	Deportivo Español
Cipolletti ^{1}	0 - 0	Godoy Cruz
Tigre ^{1}	1 - 1	San Miguel

=== Bracket ===
Round of 16
5I	San Martín (T)	2	2	4
7I	Olimpo	2	0	2
4I	Juventud Antoniana^{1}	1	0	1
5M	El Porvenir	1	0	1
4M	Quilmes	1	3	4
6I	Atlético de Rafaela	2	3	5
3M	All Boys^{1}	0	2	2
8I	Almirante Brown (A)	2	0	2
2M	Arsenal	0	1	1
7M	Defensa y Justicia	1	2	3
3I	Cipolletti	0	1	1
6M	Nueva Chicago	0	0	0
2I	Atlético Tucumán	1	2	3
8M	Tigre	3	2	5

Quarterfinals
4I	Juventud Antoniana	0	1	1
5I	San Martín (T)	0	0	0
3M	All Boys	3	2	5
6I	Atlético de Rafaela	2	1	3
3I	Cipolletti	0	2	2
7M	Defensa y Justicia	2	1	3
1M	Chacarita Juniors^{1}	0	1	1
8M	Tigre	1	0	1

Semifinals
3M	All Boys	1	3	4
4I	Juventud Antoniana	2	5	7
1M	Chacarita Juniors	1	3	4
7M	Defensa y Justicia	1	1	2

Finals
1M	Chacarita Juniors	1	1	2
4I	Juventud Antoniana	1	0	0

1: Qualified because of sport advantage.

- Note: The team in the first line plays at home the second leg.

=== Final ===
Torneo Reducido Final
(2nd. promotion playoff)
17 Jul 1999
First leg

Juventud Antoniana	1–1	Chacarita Juniors
?		?

Estadio Honorato Pistoia, Salta

24 Jul 1999
Second leg

Chacarita Juniors	1–0	Juventud Antoniana
Bustos 82'	Report

Estadio de Chacarita, Villa Maipú
Referee: Horacio Elizondo

Team details

Chacarita Juniors
Juventud Antoniana

GK	Jorge Vivaldo
DF	Diego Otaño
DF	Leonardo Sciaqua
DF	Fabio Schiavi
DF	Ricardo Pagés
MF	Diego Rivero
MF	Edgardo Boujón
MF	Diego Bustos	(substituted off) 85'
MF	Alex Rodríguez	(substituted off) 83'
FW	Luciano Ábalos	(substituted off) 66'
FW	Silvio Carrario
Substitutions:
MF	Mariano Mignini	(substituted on) 66'
FW	Miguel E. Prado	(substituted on) 83'
MF	Sergio Rondina	(substituted on) 85'
Manager:
(Argentina) Héctor Rivoira

GK	José Valdiviezo
DF	Mauro Laspada
DF	Daniel Jiménez
DF	Angel Bernuncio
DF	Alejandro Casal
MF	Sergio Albornoz	(substituted on) 53'
MF	Raúl Iturrieta
MF	Emilio Kalujerovich	(substituted on) 81'
MF	Hernán Heinze
FW	Gerardo Lucco
FW	Oscar Gómez
Substitutions:
MF	Miguel Velarde	(substituted on) 53'
MF	Lucas J. Jara	(substituted on) 81'
Manager:
(Argentina) Fernando Donaires

Note: Chacarita won 2–1 on aggregate, promoting to Primera División.

== Relegation ==
Note: Clubs with indirect affiliation with AFA are relegated to the Torneo Argentino A, while clubs directly affiliated face relegation to Primera B Metropolitana. Clubs with direct affiliation are all from Greater Buenos Aires, with the exception of Newell's, Rosario Central, Central Córdoba and Argentino de Rosario, all from Rosario, and Unión and Colón from Santa Fe.

=== Interior Zone ===
Pos	Team	1996–97 Pts	1997–98 Pts	1998–99 Pts	Total Pts	Total Pld	Avg	Situation	Affiliation
1	Instituto	22	58	57	137	76	1.803		Indirect
2	Atlético Tucumán	21	43	57	121	76	1.592		Indirect
3	Atlético de Rafaela	28	45	44	117	76	1.539		Indirect
4	Juventud Antoniana	—	—	46	46	30	1.533		Indirect
5	San Martín (T)	23	47	49	116	76	1.526		Indirect
6	San Martín (SJ)	28	48	36	112	76	1.474		Indirect
7	Almirante Brown (A)	—	45	42	87	60	1.45		Indirect
8	Cipolletti	15	34	53	102	76	1.342		Indirect
9	Godoy Cruz	28	42	30	100	76	1.316		Indirect
10	Olimpo	26	29	43	98	76	1.289		Indirect
11	Gimnasia y Tiro	26	—	33	59	46	1.283		Indirect
12	Aldosivi	17	36	42	95	76	1.25		Indirect
13	Gimnasia y Esgrima (CdU)	—	—	37	37	30	1.233		Indirect
14	San Martín (M)	—	28	38	66	60	1.1		Indirect
15	Huracán Corrientes	—	35	29	64	60	1.067	Relegation Playoff Matches	Indirect
16	Douglas Haig	13	25	24	62	76	0.816	Relegation Playoff Matches	Indirect

=== Metropolitana Zone ===
Pos	Team	1996–97 Pts	1997–98 Pts	1998–99 Pts	Total Pts	Total Pld	Avg	Situation	Affiliation
1	Chacarita Juniors	22	49	63	134	78	1.718		Direct
2	Banfield	—	62	43	105	62	1.694		Direct
3	All Boys	24	46	51	121	78	1.551		Direct
4	Quilmes	25	48	47	120	78	1.538		Direct
5	Arsenal	16	46	57	119	78	1.526		Direct
6	Central Córdoba (R)	23	48	43	114	78	1.462		Direct
7	San Miguel	—	45	43	88	62	1.419		Direct
8	Nueva Chicago	26	40	44	110	78	1.41		Direct
9	El Porvenir	—	—	45	45	32	1.406		Direct
10	Defensa y Justicia	—	42	44	86	62	1.387		Direct
11	Los Andes	30	48	28	106	78	1.359		Direct
12	Deportivo Español	—	—	43	43	32	1.344		Direct
13	Tigre	—	—	43	43	32	1.344		Direct
14	Almagro	27	22	36	85	78	1.09		Direct
15	Deportivo Morón	27	30	28	85	78	1.09		Direct
16	Atlanta	22	27	35	84	78	1.077	Primera B Metropolitana	Direct
17	Estudiantes (BA)	10	45	21	76	78	0.974	Primera B Metropolitana	Direct

== Promotion/relegation playoff ==
Teams placed 15th and 16th of the Relegation Table Interior Zone (Huracán Corrientes and Douglas Haig), played a promotion/relegation playoff or Torneo Reclasificatorio, with General Paz Juniors and Villa Mitre, teams from Torneo Argentino A. The winner was Villa Mitre and was promoted to 1999–2000 Primera B Nacional. Huracán Corrientes and Douglas Haig were relegated to Torneo Argentino A and General Paz Juniors stayed on it.

=== Semifinals ===
Team 1	Score	Team 2
Douglas Haig	0–0 (5-4 p)	General Paz Juniors

Team 1	Score	Team 2
Huracán Corrientes	1-3	Villa Mitre

=== Final ===
Team 1	Score	Team 2
Douglas Haig	1-3	Villa Mitre

== See also ==
- 1998–1999 in Argentine football
