= 1995–96 Primera B Nacional =

10th season of the second-tier football league in Argentina

Primera B Nacional
- Season: 1995–96
- Champions: Huracán Corrientes (1st divisional title)
- Promoted: Huracán Corrientes; Unión
- Relegated: Tigre
- Top goalscorer: Adrián Czornomaz 22 goals

The 1995–96 Argentine Primera B Nacional was the tenth season of second division professional of football in Argentina. A total of 22 teams competed, with the champion and runner-up being promoted to the Argentine Primera División. It was also the first season in which 3 points were awarded for a win, instead of the previous 2.

== Club information ==
Club	City	Stadium
All Boys	Floresta	Islas Malvinas
Almirante Brown	Isidro Casanova	Fragata Presidente Sarmiento
Arsenal	Sarandí	Julio H. Grondona
Atlanta	Villa Crespo	León Kolbovski
Atlético de Rafaela	Rafaela	Nuevo Monumental
Atlético Tucumán	San Miguel de Tucumán	Monumental Presidente Jose Fierro
Central Córdoba	Rosario	Gabino Sosa
Chacarita Juniors	Villa Maipú	Chacarita Juniors
Deportivo Morón	Morón	Francisco Urbano
Douglas Haig	Pergamino	Miguel Morales
Gimnasia y Tiro	Salta	Gigante del Norte
Godoy Cruz	Mendoza	Malvinas Argentinas
Huracán Corrientes	Corrientes	José Antonio Romero Feris
Instituto	Córdoba	Presidente Perón
Los Andes	Lomas de Zamora	Eduardo Gallardón
Nueva Chicago	Mataderos	Nueva Chicago
Quilmes	Quilmes	Centenario
San Martín	San Juan	Ing. Hilario Sánchez
San Martín	San Miguel de Tucumán	La Ciudadela
Talleres	Córdoba	Estadio La Boutique
Tigre	Victoria	José Dellagiovanna
Unión	Santa Fe	15 de Abril

== Apertura standings ==
Pos	Team	Pld	W	D	L	GF	GA	GD	Pts	Qualification
1	Huracán Corrientes	21	12	6	3	37	23	+14	42	Promotion Playoff
2	Atlético Tucumán	21	11	4	6	30	19	+11	37	
3	Atlético de Rafaela	21	10	6	5	33	23	+10	36	
4	Talleres (C)	21	11	2	8	31	21	+10	35	
5	Quilmes	21	9	7	5	30	21	+9	34	
6	Godoy Cruz	21	9	7	5	29	24	+5	34	
7	Instituto	21	9	6	6	34	30	+4	33	
8	San Martín (SJ)	21	9	6	6	27	23	+4	33	
9	Atlanta	21	9	5	7	26	26	0	32	
10	Nueva Chicago	21	8	7	6	29	24	+5	31	
11	Gimnasia y Tiro	21	8	5	8	31	25	+6	29	
12	Douglas Haig	21	7	7	7	21	21	0	28	
13	Unión	21	7	6	8	25	27	−2	27	
14	Chacarita Juniors	21	7	5	9	22	25	−3	26	
15	All Boys	21	6	7	8	19	28	−9	25	
16	Deportivo Morón	21	6	6	9	24	30	−6	24	
17	San Martín (T)	21	5	8	8	26	34	−8	23	
18	Almirante Brown	21	5	7	9	18	31	−13	22	
19	Arsenal	21	4	9	8	13	22	−9	21	
20	Central Córdoba (R)	21	5	5	11	22	28	−6	20	
21	Los Andes	21	3	9	9	18	26	−8	18	
22	Tigre	21	3	6	12	19	33	−14	15	

== Clausura standings ==
Pos	Team	Pld	W	D	L	GF	GA	GD	Pts	Qualification
1	Talleres (C)	21	12	6	3	31	17	+14	42	Promotion Playoff
2	Central Córdoba (R)	21	11	6	4	40	23	+17	39	
3	Unión	21	11	4	6	40	25	+15	37	
4	Douglas Haig	21	10	7	4	40	28	+12	37	
5	Los Andes	21	10	6	5	49	38	+11	36	
6	Huracán Corrientes	21	9	6	6	31	24	+7	33	
7	Godoy Cruz	21	9	5	7	30	25	+5	32	
8	Instituto	21	7	10	4	37	28	+9	31	
9	San Martín (SJ)	21	9	4	8	42	35	+7	31	
10	Atlético Tucumán	21	9	7	5	28	24	+4	31 (Note: 3 points deducted)	
11	Atlético de Rafaela	21	8	4	9	28	33	−5	28	
12	Almirante Brown	21	7	7	7	28	36	−8	28	
13	Gimnasia y Tiro	21	8	3	10	31	27	+4	27	
14	Chacarita Juniors	21	6	8	7	23	25	−2	26	
15	Quilmes	21	7	4	10	24	28	−4	25	
16	Atlanta	21	5	8	8	22	30	−8	23	
17	Nueva Chicago	21	5	6	10	32	39	−7	21	
18	Arsenal	21	3	11	7	27	32	−5	20	
19	Tigre	21	5	5	11	23	37	−14	20	
20	San Martín (T)	21	5	5	11	22	28	−6	20	
21	Deportivo Morón	21	4	7	10	26	35	−9	19	
22	All Boys	21	3	7	11	20	32	−12	16	

== Overall standings ==
Pos	Team	Pld	W	D	L	GF	GA	GD	Pts	Qualification
1	Talleres (C)	42	23	8	11	62	38	+24	77	Promotion Playoff
2	Huracán Corrientes	42	21	12	9	68	47	+21	75	Promotion Playoff
3	Atlético Tucumán	42	20	11	11	58	43	+15	68 (Note: 3 points deducted)	Second Promotion Playoff
4	Godoy Cruz	42	18	12	12	59	49	+10	66	Second Promotion Playoff
5	Douglas Haig	42	17	14	11	61	49	+12	65	Second Promotion Playoff
6	Instituto	42	16	16	10	71	58	+13	64	Second Promotion Playoff
7	Unión	42	18	10	14	65	52	+13	64	Second Promotion Playoff
8	San Martín (SJ)	42	18	10	14	69	58	+11	64	Second Promotion Playoff
9	Atlético de Rafaela	42	18	10	14	61	56	+5	64	
10	Central Córdoba (R)	42	16	11	15	62	51	+11	59	
11	Quilmes	42	16	11	15	54	48	+6	59	
12	Gimnasia y Tiro	42	16	8	18	62	64	−2	56	
13	Atlanta	42	14	13	15	48	54	−6	55	
14	Los Andes	42	13	15	14	67	64	+3	54	
15	Nueva Chicago	42	13	13	16	61	63	−2	52	
16	Chacarita Juniors	42	13	13	16	45	51	−6	52	
17	Almirante Brown	42	12	14	16	46	67	−21	50	
18	Deportivo Morón	42	10	13	19	50	65	−15	43	
19	San Martín (T)	42	10	13	19	45	74	−29	43	
20	Arsenal	42	7	20	15	40	54	−14	41	
21	All Boys	42	9	14	19	39	60	−21	41	
22	Tigre	42	8	11	23	42	70	−28	35	

== Promotion playoff ==
This leg was played between the Apertura Winner: Huracán Corrientes, and the Clausura Winner: Talleres (C). The winning team was declared champion and was automatically promoted to 1996–97 Primera División and the losing team played the Second Promotion Playoff.

=== Match details ===
Championship playoff
25 May 1996
First leg

Huracán Corrientes	2–2	Talleres (C)
Gaitán 11'; Sosa 55'	Report	Dertycia 71'; Clements 90+1'

Estadio Huracán, Corrientes
Referee: Horacio Elizondo

1 June 1996
Second leg

Talleres (C)	1–4	Huracán Corrientes
Dertycia 84' (pen.)	Report 1 Report 2	Lujambio 25', 40', 46'; Sosa 18'

Estadio Chateau Carreras, Córdoba
Attendance: 49,000
Referee: Ángel Sánchez

Team details

Talleres (C)
Huracán Corrientes

GK	1	Roberto Cabrera
DF	4	Rodolfo Graieb
DF	2	Daniel Kesman
DF	6	Hernán Biasotto
DF	3	José M. Rozzi	(substituted off) a'
MF	8	Adrián Fornero
MF	5	Javier O. López
MF	10	Diego Garay	(substituted off) b'
MF	11	José Luis Fernández	(substituted off) c'
FW	7	Diego Graieb
FW	9	Oscar Dertycia
Substitutes:
FW	16	Walter Parodi	(substituted on) a'
DF	14	Fernando Clementz	(substituted on) b'
MF	15	Víctor H. Delgado	(substituted on) c'
Manager:
(Argentina) Osvaldo Sosa

GK	1	Claudio Mele
DF	4	Cosme Zaccanti
DF	2	Diego Capria
DF	6	Julio C. Marinilli
DF	3	Sergio Umpiérrez
MF	8	Carlos A. González
MF	5	Fernando D'Amico
MF	7	Luis E. Sosa
MF	9	Gonzalo Gaitán	(substituted off) a'
FW	10	Adrián F. Álvarez	(substituted off) b'
FW	11	Josemir Lujambio
Substitutes:
DF	13	Marcelino Galoppo	(substituted on) a'
MF	15	Alberto C. Rodríguez	(substituted on) b'
Manager:
(Argentina) Humberto Zuccarelli

Note: Huracán Corrientes won 6–3 on aggregate, promoting to Primera División

== Second promotion playoff ==
The second promotion playoff or Torneo Reducido was played by the teams placed 3rd to 8th in the overall standings: Atlético Tucumán (3rd), Godoy Cruz (4th), Douglas Haig (5th), Instituto (6th), Unión (7th) and San Martín (SJ) (8th); the Promotion Playoff loser: Talleres (C); and the champion of Primera B Metropolitana:Sportivo Italiano. The winning team was promoted to 1996–97 Primera División.

=== Bracket ===
Quarterfinals
3	Atlético Tucumán	1	2	3
8	San Martín (SJ)	1	1	2
5	Douglas Haig	1	0	1
6	Instituto	1	1	2
1	Talleres (C)	1	1	2
PBM	Sportivo Italiano	1	0	1
4	Godoy Cruz	0	1	1
7	Unión	3	3	6

Semifinals
3	Atlético Tucumán	1	1	2
6	Instituto	1	3	4
1	Talleres (C)	1	1	2
7	Unión	3	3	6

Final
6	Instituto	1	1	2
7	Unión	3	0	3

- Note: The team in the first line plays at home the second leg.

=== Finals ===
Torneo Reducido Final
(2nd. promotion playoff)
6 Jul 1996
First leg

Unión	3–1	Instituto
Marzo; Mazzoni	Report	Bonfigli

Estadio 15 de Abril, Santa Fe

13 Jul 1996
Second leg

Instituto	1–0	Unión
Klimowicz	Report

Estadio Alta Córdoba, Córdoba

Team details

Instituto
Unión

GK	1	Pablo Del Vecchio
DF	4	José Guerrero
DF	2	José Céliz
DF	6	Adrián Bozzolletti
DF	3	Daniel Becerra
MF	8	Cristian Pino
MF	5	Sergio González
MF	10	Sergio Bonfigli
FW	7	Víctor Lafure
FW	9	Diego Klimowicz
FW	11	Claudio Sarría
Manager:
(Argentina) Jorge Ghiso

GK	1	Juan C. Maciel
DF	4	Martín Mazzoni
DF	2	Eduardo Magnín
DF	6	Fabián Castro
DF	3	Félix Pereyra
MF	8	Lautaro Trullet
MF	5	Silvio Mendoza
MF	10	Darío Cabrol
FW	7	José L. Marzo
FW	9	Pablo Bezombe
FW	11	Sebastián Clotet
Manager:
(Argentina) Carlos Trullet

Note: Unión won 3–2 on aggregate, promoting to Primera División.

== Relegation ==
Pos	Team	1993–94 Pts	1994–95 Pts	1995–96 Pts	Total Pts	Total Pld	Avg	Situation	Affiliation
1	Huracán Corrientes	—	—	54	54	42	1.286		Indirect
2	Talleres (C)	47	—	54	101	84	1.202		Indirect
3	Godoy Cruz	—	50	48	98	84	1.167		Indirect
4	Quilmes	55	45	43	143	126	1.135		Direct
5	Atlético de Rafaela	42	54	46	142	126	1.127		Indirect
6	San Martín (SJ)	—	—	46	46	42	1.095		Indirect
7	Instituto	46	43	48	137	126	1.087		Indirect
8	Douglas Haig	41	45	48	134	126	1.063		Indirect
9	Unión	43	44	46	133	126	1.056		Direct
10	Gimnasia y Tiro	—	48	40	88	84	1.048		Indirect
11	San Martín (T)	47	48	33	128	126	1.016		Indirect
12	Atlético Tucumán	45	32	49	126	126	1		Indirect
13	Nueva Chicago	46	41	39	126	126	1		Direct
14	Atlanta	—	—	41	41	42	0.976		Direct
15	All Boys	45	45	32	122	126	0.968		Direct
16	Los Andes	—	39	41	80	84	0.952		Direct
17	Deportivo Morón	45	41	33	119	126	0.944		Direct
18	Chacarita Juniors	—	40	39	79	84	0.94		Direct
19	Central Córdoba (R)	34	39	43	116	126	0.921		Direct
20	Almirante Brown	38	39	38	115	126	0.913	Relegation Playoff Matches	Direct
21	Arsenal	43	36	34	113	126	0.897	Relegation Playoff Matches	Direct
22	Tigre	—	—	27	27	42	0.643	Relegation Playoff Matches	Direct

Note: Clubs with indirect affiliation with AFA are relegated to their respective league of his province according to the Argentine football league system, while clubs directly affiliated face relegation to Primera B Metropolitana. Clubs with direct affiliation are all from Greater Buenos Aires, with the exception of Newell's, Rosario Central, Central Córdoba and Argentino de Rosario, all from Rosario, and Unión and Colón from Santa Fe.

== Relegation playoff matches ==
The relegation playoff matches or Torneo Reclasificatorio were played by the 3 teams placed 20th, 21st, and 22nd of the relegation table, and 15 teams from Primera B Metropolitana.

=== First round ===
In the first round played the 14 teams of Primera B Metropolitana.

First Round
First Leg
Home	Result	Away
Temperley	1 - 1	Dock Sud
Deportivo Armenio	0 - 2	Sarmiento (J)
Defensores de Belgrano	0 - 0	San Miguel
Defensores Unidos	1 - 0	Talleres (RE)
El Porvenir	0 - 1	Tristán Suárez
Argentino (R)	3 - 0	Deportivo Laferrere
Defensa y Justicia	1 - 1	Argentino (Q)
Second Leg
Dock Sud	0 - 1	Temperley
Sarmiento (J)	1 - 2	Deportivo Armenio
San Miguel	3 - 0	Defensores de Belgrano
Talleres (RE)	1 - 2	Defensores Unidos
Tristán Suárez	3 - 2	El Porvenir
Deportivo Laferrere	0 - 0	Argentino (R)
Argentino (Q)	(4) 0 - 0 (5)	Defensa y Justicia

=== Second round ===
In the second round played Almagro, runner-up of Primera B Metropolitana, and 7 teams that qualified from the First Round.

Second Round
First Leg
Home	Result	Away
Defensores Unidos	1 - 2	Almagro
Argentino (R)	1 - 0	Temperley
Defensa y Justicia	0 - 0	Sarmiento (J)
Tristán Suárez	1 - 2	San Miguel
Second Leg
Almagro	1 - 1	Defensores Unidos
Temperley	3 - 0	Argentino (R)
Sarmiento (J)	2 - 0	Defensa y Justicia
San Miguel	2 - 2	Tristán Suárez

=== Third round ===
In the third round played the 3 teams placed 20th, 21st, and 22nd of the relegation table (Almirante Brown, Arsenal and Tigre), 4 teams that qualified from the Second Round and the best loser team placed in the overall standings of Primera B Metropolitana. Almirante Brown and Arsenal won their playoffs and remained in the Primera B Nacional. Sarmiento (J) and Almagro won their playoffs and were promoted to Primera B Nacional. Temperley was also promoted as the best loser placed in the overall standings of Primera B Metropolitana. Tigre was relegated to Primera B Metropolitana and San Miguel and Tristán Suárez remained on it.

Third Round
First Leg
Home	Result	Away
Tristán Suárez	0 - 3	Almirante Brown
Arsenal	0 - 0	San Miguel
Sarmiento (J)	1 - 1	Tigre
Temperley	0 - 2	Almagro
Second Leg
Almirante Brown	1 - 2	Tristán Suárez
San Miguel	0 - 1	Arsenal
Tigre	1 - 3	Sarmiento (J)
Almagro	6 - 1	Temperley

== See also ==
- 1995–96 in Argentine football
