= 1996–97 Primera B Nacional =

11th season of the second-tier football league in Argentina

Primera B Nacional
- Season: 1996–97
- Champions: Argentinos Juniors (1st divisional title)
- Promoted: Argentinos Juniors; Gimnasia y Tiro
- Relegated: Sarmiento (J); Gimnasia y Esgrima (CdU); Temperley; Juventud Antoniana
- Top goalscorer: Eduardo Bennett 23 goals

The 1996–97 Argentine Primera B Nacional was the 11th season of second division professional of football in Argentina. A total of 32 teams competed; the champion and runner-up were promoted to Argentine Primera División.

== Club information ==
=== Interior Zone ===
| Club | City | Stadium |
|---|---|---|
| Aldosivi | Mar del Plata | José María Minella |
| Atlético de Rafaela | Rafaela | Nuevo Monumental |
| Atlético Tucumán | San Miguel de Tucumán | Monumental Presidente Jose Fierro |
| Belgrano | Córdoba | El Gigante de Alberdi |
| Chaco For Ever | Resistencia | Juan Alberto García |
| Cipolletti | Cipolletti | La Visera de Cemento |
| Douglas Haig | Pergamino | Miguel Morales |
| Gimnasia y Esgrima | Concepción del Uruguay | Manuel y Ramón Núñez |
| Gimnasia y Tiro | Salta | Gigante del Norte |
| Godoy Cruz | Mendoza | Malvinas Argentinas |
| Instituto | Córdoba | Presidente Perón |
| Juventud Antoniana | Salta | Fray Honorato Pistoia |
| Olimpo | Bahía Blanca | Roberto Natalio Carminatti |
| San Martín | San Juan | Ing. Hilario Sánchez |
| San Martín | San Miguel de Tucumán | La Ciudadela |
| Talleres | Córdoba | Estadio La Boutique |

=== Metropolitana Zone ===
| Club | City | Stadium |
|---|---|---|
| All Boys | Floresta | Islas Malvinas |
| Almagro | José Ingenieros | Tres de Febrero |
| Almirante Brown | Isidro Casanova | Fragata Presidente Sarmiento |
| Argentinos Juniors | Buenos Aires | Diego Armando Maradona |
| Arsenal | Sarandí | Julio H. Grondona |
| Atlanta | Villa Crespo | León Kolbovski |
| Central Córdoba | Rosario | Gabino Sosa |
| Chacarita Juniors | Villa Maipú | Chacarita Juniors |
| Deportivo Morón | Morón | Francisco Urbano |
| Estudiantes | Caseros | Ciudad de Caseros |
| Los Andes | Lomas de Zamora | Eduardo Gallardón |
| Nueva Chicago | Mataderos | Nueva Chicago |
| Quilmes | Quilmes | Centenario |
| Sarmiento | Junín | Eva Perón |
| Sportivo Italiano | Ciudad Evita | Republica de Italia |
| Temperley | Temperley | Alfredo Beranger |

== Interior Zone standings ==
=== Sub-Zone A1 ===
| Pos | Team | Pld | W | D | L | GF | GA | GD | Pts | Qualification |
|---|---|---|---|---|---|---|---|---|---|---|
| 1 | Belgrano | 16 | 9 | 4 | 3 | 30 | 19 | +11 | 31 | Championship Group |
| 2 | San Martín (SJ) | 16 | 8 | 4 | 4 | 27 | 17 | +10 | 28 | Championship Group |
| 3 | Atlético de Rafaela | 16 | 8 | 4 | 4 | 27 | 21 | +6 | 28 | Championship Group |
| 4 | Olimpo | 16 | 8 | 2 | 6 | 25 | 21 | +4 | 26 | Fourth Place Playoff |
| 5 | San Martín (T) | 16 | 7 | 2 | 7 | 27 | 26 | +1 | 23 | Relegation Group |
| 6 | Aldosivi | 16 | 4 | 5 | 7 | 16 | 29 | −13 | 17 | Relegation Group |
| 7 | Juventud Antoniana | 16 | 3 | 7 | 6 | 21 | 25 | −4 | 16 | Relegation Group |
| 8 | Chaco For Ever | 16 | 4 | 4 | 8 | 20 | 29 | −9 | 16 | Relegation Group |

=== Sub-Zone A2 ===
| Pos | Team | Pld | W | D | L | GF | GA | GD | Pts | Qualification |
|---|---|---|---|---|---|---|---|---|---|---|
| 1 | Godoy Cruz | 16 | 8 | 4 | 4 | 22 | 13 | +9 | 28 | Championship Group |
| 2 | Gimnasia y Tiro | 16 | 7 | 5 | 4 | 23 | 19 | +4 | 26 | Championship Group |
| 3 | Talleres (C) | 16 | 7 | 5 | 4 | 28 | 19 | +9 | 26 | Championship Group |
| 4 | Instituto | 16 | 6 | 4 | 6 | 21 | 19 | +2 | 22 | Fourth Place Playoff |
| 5 | Atlético Tucumán | 16 | 6 | 3 | 7 | 26 | 28 | −2 | 21 | Relegation Group |
| 6 | Cipolletti | 16 | 3 | 6 | 7 | 19 | 19 | 0 | 15 | Relegation Group |
| 7 | Douglas Haig | 16 | 2 | 7 | 7 | 15 | 28 | −13 | 13 | Relegation Group |
| 8 | Gimnasia y Esgrima (CdU) | 16 | 3 | 4 | 9 | 14 | 29 | −15 | 13 | Relegation Group |

== Metropolitana Zone standings ==
=== Sub-Zone B1 ===
| Pos | Team | Pld | W | D | L | GF | GA | GD | Pts | Qualification |
|---|---|---|---|---|---|---|---|---|---|---|
| 1 | Almagro | 16 | 7 | 6 | 3 | 20 | 13 | +7 | 27 | Championship Group |
| 2 | Quilmes | 16 | 6 | 7 | 3 | 15 | 13 | +2 | 25 | Championship Group |
| 3 | All Boys | 16 | 6 | 6 | 4 | 24 | 21 | +3 | 24 | Championship Group |
| 4 | Central Córdoba (R) | 16 | 5 | 8 | 3 | 24 | 16 | +8 | 23 | Fourth Place Playoff |
| 5 | Atlanta | 16 | 4 | 10 | 2 | 24 | 20 | +4 | 22 | Relegation Group |
| 6 | Arsenal | 16 | 3 | 7 | 6 | 12 | 16 | −4 | 16 | Relegation Group |
| 7 | Almirante Brown | 16 | 3 | 5 | 8 | 16 | 25 | −9 | 14 | Relegation Group |
| 8 | Temperley | 16 | 2 | 5 | 9 | 13 | 25 | −12 | 11 | Relegation Group |

=== Sub-Zone B2 ===
| Pos | Team | Pld | W | D | L | GF | GA | GD | Pts | Qualification |
|---|---|---|---|---|---|---|---|---|---|---|
| 1 | Los Andes | 16 | 7 | 7 | 2 | 28 | 15 | +13 | 28 | Championship Group |
| 2 | Argentinos Juniors | 16 | 7 | 7 | 2 | 27 | 20 | +7 | 28 | Championship Group |
| 3 | Deportivo Morón | 16 | 8 | 3 | 5 | 25 | 19 | +6 | 27 | Championship Group |
| 4 | Nueva Chicago | 16 | 7 | 5 | 4 | 25 | 16 | +9 | 26 | Fourth Place Playoff |
| 5 | Chacarita Juniors | 16 | 5 | 8 | 3 | 27 | 21 | +6 | 23 | Relegation Group |
| 6 | Sportivo Italiano | 16 | 2 | 9 | 5 | 14 | 22 | −8 | 15 | Relegation Group |
| 7 | Sarmiento (J) | 16 | 2 | 6 | 8 | 15 | 29 | −14 | 12 | Relegation Group |
| 8 | Estudiantes (BA) | 16 | 1 | 7 | 8 | 7 | 22 | −15 | 10 | Relegation Group |

== Fourth Place Playoff ==
A tiebreaker was played between the teams that finished 4th in their respective zones. For the Interior Zone played Olimpo vs Instituto and for the Metropolitana Zone played Central Córdoba (R) vs Nueva Chicago. Both matches were played in neutral stadiums. The winning teams qualified for the Championship Group.

| Team 1 | Score | Team 2 |
|---|---|---|
| Olimpo | 3-0 | Instituto |

| Team 1 | Score | Team 2 |
|---|---|---|
| Central Córdoba (R) | 0–0 (4-3 p) | Nueva Chicago |

== Championship Group ==
The championship Group was played by the 14 teams that qualified from their zones and the 2 teams that qualified by winning the Fourth Place Playoff. The winning team was declared champion and was automatically promoted to Primera Division, and the teams placed 2nd to 5th played the Second Promotion Playoff.

| Pos | Team | Pld | W | D | L | GF | GA | GD | Pts | Promotion or qualification |
|---|---|---|---|---|---|---|---|---|---|---|
| 1 | Argentinos Juniors | 26 | 15 | 7 | 4 | 52 | 30 | +22 | 52 | Primera Division |
| 2 | Talleres (C) | 26 | 14 | 8 | 4 | 47 | 23 | +24 | 50 | Second Promotion Playoff |
| 3 | Godoy Cruz | 26 | 14 | 6 | 6 | 49 | 34 | +15 | 48 | Second Promotion Playoff |
| 4 | Gimnasia y Tiro | 26 | 12 | 7 | 7 | 52 | 39 | +13 | 43 | Second Promotion Playoff |
| 5 | Belgrano | 26 | 10 | 10 | 6 | 52 | 40 | +12 | 40 | Second Promotion Playoff |
| 6 | Quilmes | 26 | 12 | 4 | 10 | 45 | 34 | +11 | 40 | |
| 7 | Los Andes | 26 | 10 | 5 | 11 | 37 | 39 | −2 | 35 | |
| 8 | Central Córdoba (R) | 26 | 9 | 4 | 13 | 32 | 52 | −20 | 31 | |
| 9 | Almagro | 26 | 8 | 6 | 12 | 48 | 54 | −6 | 30 | |
| 10 | Olimpo | 26 | 7 | 7 | 12 | 41 | 46 | −5 | 28 | |
| 11 | Atlético de Rafaela | 26 | 7 | 9 | 10 | 39 | 47 | −8 | 27 (Note: 3 points deducted) | |
| 12 | All Boys | 26 | 6 | 6 | 14 | 28 | 49 | −21 | 24 | |
| 13 | San Martín (SJ) | 26 | 6 | 10 | 10 | 32 | 39 | −7 | 24 (Note: 4 points deducted) | |
| 14 | Deportivo Morón | 26 | 4 | 7 | 15 | 27 | 55 | −28 | 19 | |

== Relegation Group ==
It was divided in 2 groups (Interior and Metropolitana). 9 teams played in each group. Teams placed 1st and 2nd qualified for the Second Promotion Playoff.

=== Interior Group ===
| Pos | Team | Pld | W | D | L | GF | GA | GD | Pts | Qualification |
|---|---|---|---|---|---|---|---|---|---|---|
| 1 | Chaco For Ever | 16 | 9 | 2 | 5 | 26 | 16 | +10 | 29 | Second Promotion Playoff |
| 2 | Cipolletti | 16 | 8 | 4 | 4 | 28 | 17 | +11 | 28 | Second Promotion Playoff |
| 3 | Instituto | 16 | 9 | 1 | 6 | 35 | 29 | +6 | 28 | |
| 4 | Aldosivi | 16 | 8 | 2 | 6 | 19 | 22 | −3 | 26 | |
| 5 | San Martín (T) | 16 | 6 | 4 | 6 | 26 | 26 | 0 | 22 | |
| 6 | Gimnasia y Esgrima (CdU) | 16 | 6 | 3 | 7 | 28 | 32 | −4 | 21 | |
| 7 | Douglas Haig | 16 | 5 | 4 | 7 | 20 | 21 | −1 | 19 | |
| 8 | Juventud Antoniana | 16 | 4 | 4 | 8 | 18 | 27 | −9 | 16 | |
| 9 | Atlético Tucumán | 16 | 4 | 2 | 10 | 20 | 30 | −10 | 14 | |

=== Metropolitano Group ===
| Pos | Team | Pld | W | D | L | GF | GA | GD | Pts | Qualification |
|---|---|---|---|---|---|---|---|---|---|---|
| 1 | Nueva Chicago | 16 | 9 | 3 | 4 | 31 | 20 | +11 | 30 | Second Promotion Playoff |
| 2 | Sportivo Italiano | 16 | 8 | 6 | 2 | 19 | 15 | +4 | 30 | Second Promotion Playoff |
| 3 | Almirante Brown | 16 | 6 | 6 | 4 | 26 | 20 | +6 | 24 | |
| 4 | Estudiantes (BA) | 16 | 5 | 7 | 4 | 21 | 19 | +2 | 22 | |
| 5 | Atlanta | 16 | 5 | 7 | 4 | 17 | 15 | +2 | 22 | |
| 6 | Chacarita Juniors | 16 | 5 | 6 | 5 | 14 | 14 | 0 | 21 | |
| 7 | Temperley | 16 | 3 | 8 | 5 | 15 | 20 | −5 | 17 | |
| 8 | Arsenal | 16 | 4 | 4 | 8 | 15 | 21 | −6 | 16 | |
| 9 | Sarmiento (J) | 16 | 3 | 1 | 12 | 11 | 25 | −14 | 10 | |

== Second Promotion Playoff ==
The Second Promotion playoff was played by the teams placed 2nd to 5th from the Championship Group and 4 teams (2 from Interior Group and 2 from Metropolitano Group) from the Relegation Group. The winning team was promoted to Primera Division.

=== Bracket ===
Quarterfinals
2CG | Talleres (C) | 3 | 2 | 5
2IG | Cipolletti | 2 | 2 | 4
3CG | Godoy Cruz | 0 | 0 | 0
2MG | Sportivo Italiano | 3 | 2 | 5
4CG | Gimnasia y Tiro | 1 | 2 | 3
1IG | Chaco For Ever | 1 | 0 | 1
5CG | Belgrano | 2 | 3 | 5
1MG | Nueva Chicago | 0 | 1 | 1

Semifinals
2CG | Talleres (C) | 0 | 2 | 2
2MG | Sportivo Italiano | 0 | 0 | 0
4CG | Gimnasia y Tiro | 2 | 3 | 5
5CG | Belgrano | 2 | 1 | 3

Final
2CG | Talleres (C) | 0 | 1 | 1(1)
4CG | Gimnasia y Tiro (p) | 1 | 0 | 1(3)

- Note: The team in the first line plays at home the second leg.

=== Finals ===
Torneo Reducido Final
(2nd. promotion playoff)
12 Jul 1997
First leg

| Gimnasia y Tiro | 1–0 | Talleres (C) |
|---|---|---|
| | [ Report] |

El Gigante del Norte, Salta

19 Jul 1997
Second leg

| Talleres (C) | 1–0 (a.e.t.) | Gimnasia y Tiro |
|---|---|---|
| Zelaya 29' | Report |
Penalties
| Montelongo (penalty scored); Díaz (penalty scored); Oste (penalty missed); Clementz (penalty missed) | 1–3 | Ibánez (penalty scored); Cervera (penalty scored); Plaza (penalty scored) |

Estadio Chateau Carreras, Córdoba
Referee: Rubén Pascualino

Team details

Talleres (C)
Gimnasia y Tiro

| GK | Rodrigo Burela |
| DF | Juan A. Yanzón |
| DF | Ramón Galarza |
| DF | Cristian García |
| DF | Javier López | (substituted off) a' |
| MF | José Luis Villarreal |
| MF | Fernando Clementz |
| MF | Ezequiel Garay |
| MF | José L. Fernández | (substituted off) b' |
| FW | José Zelaya | (substituted off) c' |
| FW | Roberto Oste |
Substitutions:
| DF | José Montelongo | (substituted on) a' |
| DF | David Díaz | (substituted on) b' |
| FW | Alejandro N. Ortiz | (substituted on) c' |
Manager:
(Argentina) Humberto Zuccarelli

| GK | Ramón Álvarez |
| DF | Diego Cejas |
| DF | Sergio Plaza |
| DF | Roberto Cuadrado |
| DF | Mario Jiménez |
| MF | Miguel Ibáñez |
| MF | Isidro Iturrieta | (substituted off) a' |
| MF | Jorge Cervera |
| FW | Leone | (substituted off) b' |
| FW | Víctor Godoy | (substituted off) c' |
| FW | Luis Rueda |
Substitutions:
| FW | Pablo J. Saldaño | (substituted on) a' |
| DF | Angel S. Gómez | (substituted on) b' |
| MF | Rolado F. González | (substituted on) c' |
Manager:
(Argentina) Ricardo Rezza

Note: After the series ended 1–1 on aggregate, Gimnasia y Tiro won 3–1 on penalties, promoting to Primera División.

== Relegation ==
Note: Clubs with indirect affiliation with AFA are relegated to the Torneo Argentino A, while clubs directly affiliated face relegation to Primera B Metropolitana. Clubs with direct affiliation are all from Greater Buenos Aires, with the exception of Newell's, Rosario Central, Central Córdoba and Argentino de Rosario, all from Rosario, and Unión and Colón from Santa Fe.

=== Interior Zone ===
| Pos | Team | 1994–95 Pts | 1995–96 Pts | 1996–97 Pts | Total Pts | Total Pld | Avg | Situation | Affiliation |
|---|---|---|---|---|---|---|---|---|---|
| 1 | Instituto | 43 | 48 | 35 | 126 | 116 | 1.086 | | Indirect |
| 2 | Douglas Haig | 45 | 48 | 25 | 118 | 116 | 1.017 | | Indirect |
| 3 | Cipolletti | — | — | 32 | 32 | 32 | 1 | | Indirect |
| 4 | Chaco For Ever | — | — | 32 | 32 | 32 | 1 | | Indirect |
| 5 | San Martín (T) | 48 | 33 | 32 | 113 | 116 | 0.974 | | Indirect |
| 6 | Aldosivi | — | — | 31 | 31 | 32 | 0.969 | | Indirect |
| 7 | Atlético Tucumán | 32 | 49 | 25 | 106 | 116 | 0.914 | | Indirect |
| 8 | Gimnasia y Esgrima (CdU) | — | — | 25 | 25 | 32 | 0.781 | Torneo Argentino A | Indirect |
| 9 | Juventud Antoniana | — | — | 25 | 25 | 32 | 0.781 | Torneo Argentino A | Indirect |

=== Metropolitana Zone ===
| Pos | Team | 1994–95 Pts | 1995–96 Pts | 1996–97 Pts | Total Pts | Total Pld | Avg | Situation | Affiliation |
|---|---|---|---|---|---|---|---|---|---|
| 1 | Atlanta | — | — | 35 | 32 | 32 | 1.094 | | Direct |
| 2 | Sportivo Italiano | — | — | 35 | 35 | 32 | 1.094 | | Direct |
| 3 | Nueva Chicago | 41 | 39 | 40 | 120 | 116 | 1.034 | | Direct |
| 4 | Chacarita Juniors | 40 | 39 | 34 | 113 | 116 | 0.974 | | Direct |
| 5 | Almirante Brown | — | — | 29 | 29 | 32 | 0.906 | | Direct |
| 6 | Estudiantes (BA) | — | — | 26 | 26 | 32 | 0.813 | | Direct |
| 7 | Arsenal | — | — | 25 | 25 | 32 | 0.781 | | Direct |
| 8 | Temperley | — | — | 23 | 23 | 32 | 0.719 | Primera B Metropolitana | Direct |
| 9 | Sarmiento (J) | — | — | 17 | 17 | 32 | 0.531 | Primera B Metropolitana | Direct |

== See also ==
- 1996–97 in Argentine football
