= 1996–97 Argentine Primera División =

106th season of top-tier football league in Argentina

Primera División
- Season: 1996–97
- Dates: August 23, 1996 – August 12, 1997
- Champions: Apertura: River Plate (27th. title); Clausura: River Plate (28th. title)
- 1998 Copa Libertadores: River Plate; Colón
- 1997 Copa Conmebol: Lanús; Colón
- Matches played: 380

The 1996–97 Argentine Primera División was the 106th season of top-flight football in Argentina. The season ran from August 23, 1996, to August 13, 1997. Huracán Corrientes (champion of 1995–96 Primera B Nacional) and Unión de Santa Fe promoted from Primera B Nacional.

River Plate won both, Apertura and Clausura championships (27th. and 28th. league titles). On the other hand, Huracán Corrientes and Banfield were relegated with the worst points averages.

== Torneo Apertura ==
Apertura
- Season: 1996
- Dates: 23 August – 23 December
- Champions: River Plate (27th. title)
- Promoted: Huracán (C); Unión SF
- Top goalscorer: (Argentina) Gustavo Reggi (11)
- Biggest home win: Boca Jrs. 6–0 Huracán (27 Nov); Colón 6–0 Banfield (18 Dec)
- Biggest away win: Estudiantes LP 0–5 Newell's (11 Nov)
- Highest scoring: Huracán (C) 3–6 Unión (25 Aug); GELP 6–3 Huracán (C) (22 Dec)

=== League standings ===
Pos	Team	Pld	W	D	L	GF	GA	GD	Pts
1	River Plate	19	15	1	3	52	22	+30	46
2	Independiente	19	11	4	4	34	22	+12	37
3	Lanús	19	10	6	3	23	12	+11	36
4	Racing	19	9	5	5	31	24	+7	32
5	Rosario Central	19	8	7	4	35	28	+7	31
6	Gimnasia y Esgrima (LP)	19	7	6	6	21	20	+1	27
7	San Lorenzo	19	8	3	8	24	24	0	27
8	Colón	19	6	8	5	26	24	+2	26
9	Newell's Old Boys	19	7	5	7	24	26	−2	26
10	Boca Juniors	19	7	4	8	36	33	+3	25
11	Estudiantes (LP)	19	7	4	8	27	28	−1	25
12	Gimnasia y Esgrima (J)	19	6	7	6	18	19	−1	25
13	Vélez Sársfield	19	6	5	8	29	33	−4	23
14	Ferro Carril Oeste	19	5	7	7	32	34	−2	22
15	Platense	19	5	6	8	25	30	−5	21
16	Unión	19	5	5	9	24	27	−3	20
17	Huracán (C)	19	4	7	8	31	40	−9	19
18	Deportivo Español	19	2	10	7	18	25	−7	16
19	Huracán	19	3	7	9	21	36	−15	16
20	Banfield	19	3	4	12	14	38	−24	13

=== Fixtures ===
Fecha 1
Local	Score	Guest
Estudiantes	2 - 3	Boca Juniors
Colón	1 - 1	Deportivo Español
Lanús	0 - 0	Huracán
San Lorenzo	0 - 1	Banfield
Huracán Corrientes	3 - 6	Unión
River Plate	0 - 0	Gimnasia (LP)
Ferro Carril Oeste	0 - 3	Independiente
Newell's Old Boys	0 - 2	Vélez Sarsfield
Racing Club	0 - 2	Rosario Central
Gimnasia (J)	1 - 0	Platense

Fecha 2
Local	Score	Guest
Platense	2 - 4	Estudiantes
Deportivo Español	0 - 1	Lanús
Huracán	1 - 1	San Lorenzo
Banfield	1 - 1	Huracán Corrientes
Unión	1 - 3	River Plate
Gimnasia (LP)	1 - 0	Ferro Carril Oeste
Independiente	4 - 0	Newell's Old Boys
Vélez Sarsfield	2 - 3	Racing Club
Rosario Central	0 - 0	Gimnasia (J)
Boca Juniors	2 - 3	Colón

Fecha 3
Local	Score	Guest
Estudiantes	0 - 2	Rosario Central
Colón	1 - 1	Platense
Lanús	3 - 1	Boca Juniors
San Lorenzo	0 - 1	Deportivo Español
Huracán Corrientes	1 - 1	Huracán
River Plate	2 - 0	Banfield
Ferro Carril Oeste	2 - 2	Unión
Newell's Old Boys	1 - 0	Gimnasia (LP)
Vélez Sarsfield	2 - 3	Independiente
Racing Club	0 - 0	Gimnasia (J)

Fecha 4
Local	Score	Guest
Gimnasia (J)	2 - 0	Estudiantes
Rosario Central	0 - 0	Colón
Platense	0 - 0	Lanús
Boca Juniors	1 - 1	San Lorenzo
Deportivo Español	1 - 0	Huracán Corrientes
Huracán	2 - 3	River Plate
Banfield	3 - 2	Ferro Carril Oeste
Unión	1 - 2	Newell's Old Boys
Gimnasia (LP)	1 - 1	Vélez Sarsfield
Independiente	2 - 2	Racing Club

Fecha 5
Local	Score	Guest
Estudiantes	1 - 2	Racing Club
Colón	0 - 0	Gimnasia (J)
Lanús	2 - 1	Rosario Central
San Lorenzo	1 - 0	Platense
Huracán Corrientes	1 - 3	Boca Juniors
River Plate	3 - 1	Deportivo Español
Ferro Carril Oeste	4 - 2	Huracán
Newell's Old Boys	2 - 0	Banfield
Vélez Sarsfield	2 - 0	Unión
Independiente	2 - 0	Gimnasia (LP)

Fecha 6
Local	Score	Guest
Estudiantes	2 - 3	Colón
Racing Club	0 - 1	Gimnasia (LP)
Gimnasia (J)	1 - 2	Lanús
Rosario Central	1 - 2	San Lorenzo
Platense	0 - 1	Huracán Corrientes
Boca Juniors	3 - 2	River Plate
Deportivo Español	2 - 2	Ferro Carril Oeste
Huracán	1 - 1	Newell's Old Boys
Banfield	1 - 3	Vélez Sarsfield
Unión	0 - 1	Independiente

Fecha 7
Local	Score	Guest
Lanús	0 - 0	Estudiantes
Colón	0 - 2	Racing Club
Gimnasia (LP)	1 - 1	Unión
San Lorenzo	1 - 0	Gimnasia (J)
Huracán Corrientes	1 - 1	Rosario Central
River Plate	4 - 1	Platense
Ferro Carril Oeste	3 - 1	Boca Juniors
Newell's Old Boys	2 - 0	Deportivo Español
Vélez Sarsfield	2 - 1	Huracán
Independiente	1 - 1	Banfield

Fecha 8
Local	Score	Guest
Estudiantes	1 - 0	San Lorenzo
Colón	0 - 1	Lanús
Banfield	0 - 2	Gimnasia (LP)
Racing Club	2 - 1	Unión
Gimnasia (J)	0 - 0	Huracán Corrientes
Rosario Central	2 - 5	River Plate
Platense	1 - 0	Ferro Carril Oeste
Boca Juniors	2 - 1	Newell's Old Boys
Deportivo Español	1 - 2	Vélez Sarsfield
Huracán	1 - 1	Independiente

Fecha 9
Local	Score	Guest
Huracán Corrientes	2 - 2	Estudiantes
San Lorenzo	4 - 1	Colón
Lanús	1 - 1	Racing Club
Gimnasia (LP)	1 - 0	Huracán
Unión	3 - 1	Banfield
River Plate	3 - 0	Gimnasia (J)
Ferro Carril Oeste	1 - 3	Rosario Central
Newell's Old Boys	2 - 2	Platense
Vélez Sarsfield	1 - 1	Boca Juniors
Independiente	2 - 2	Deportivo Español

Fecha 10
Local	Score	Guest
Estudiantes	0 - 1	River Plate
Colón	1 - 1	Huracán Corrientes
Lanús	3 - 1	San Lorenzo
Deportivo Español	1 - 2	Gimnasia (LP)
Huracán	3 - 0	Unión
Racing Club	1 - 0	Banfield
Gimnasia (J)	2 - 2	Ferro Carril Oeste
Rosario Central	1 - 1	Newell's Old Boys
Platense	4 - 4	Vélez Sarsfield
Boca Juniors	0 - 1	Independiente

Fecha 11
Local	Score	Guest
Ferro Carril Oeste	3 - 2	Estudiantes
River Plate	3 - 0	Colón
Huracán Corrientes	1 - 1	Lanús
San Lorenzo	3 - 0	Racing Club
Gimnasia (LP)	1 - 1	Boca Juniors
Unión	1 - 1	Deportivo Español
Banfield	1 - 2	Huracán
Newell's Old Boys	3 - 1	Gimnasia (J)
Vélez Sarsfield	4 - 4	Rosario Central
Independiente	1 - 4	Platense

Fecha 12
Local	Score	Guest
Estudiantes	0 - 5	Newell's Old Boys
Colón	1 - 1	Ferro Carril Oeste
Lanús	3 - 1	River Plate
San Lorenzo	4 - 2	Huracán Corrientes
Platense	3 - 1	Gimnasia (LP)
Boca Juniors	2 - 0	Unión
Deportivo Español	0 - 0	Banfield
Racing Club	6 - 1	Huracán
Gimnasia (J)	1 - 1	Vélez Sarsfield
Rosario Central	3 - 1	Independiente

Fecha 13
Local	Score	Guest
Vélez Sarsfield	0 - 2	Estudiantes
Newell's Old Boys	1 - 1	Colón
Ferro Carril Oeste	1 - 2	Lanús
River Plate	4 - 0	San Lorenzo
Huracán Corrientes	2 - 3	Racing Club
Gimnasia (LP)	1 - 2	Rosario Central
Unión	0 - 1	Platense
Banfield	3 - 1	Boca Juniors
Huracán	1 - 0	Deportivo Español
Independiente	1 - 0	Gimnasia (J)

Fecha 14
Local	Score	Guest
Estudiantes	1 - 0	Independiente
Colón	2 - 1	Vélez Sarsfield
Lanús	2 - 0	Newell's Old Boys
San Lorenzo	2 - 2	Ferro Carril Oeste
Huracán Corrientes	1 - 2	River Plate
Gimnasia (J)	1 - 0	Gimnasia (LP)
Rosario Central	1 - 3	Unión
Platense	2 - 0	Banfield
Boca Juniors	6 - 0	Huracán
Racing Club	0 - 0	Deportivo Español

Fecha 15
Local	Score	Guest
Gimnasia (LP)	0 - 0	Estudiantes
Independiente	2 - 1	Colón
Vélez Sarsfield	2 - 0	Lanús
Newell's Old Boys	0 - 2	San Lorenzo
Ferro Carril Oeste	5 - 1	Huracán Corrientes
River Plate	4 - 3	Racing Club
Unión	2 - 0	Gimnasia (J)
Banfield	1 - 1	Rosario Central
Huracán	1 - 1	Platense
Deportivo Español	1 - 1	Boca Juniors

Fecha 16
Local	Score	Guest
Estudiantes	1 - 0	Unión
Colón	3 - 1	Gimnasia (LP)
Lanús	1 - 2	Independiente
San Lorenzo	1 - 0	Vélez Sarsfield
Huracán Corrientes	4 - 1	Newell's Old Boys
River Plate	5 - 1	Ferro Carril Oeste
Racing Club	4 - 2	Boca Juniors
Gimnasia (J)	4 - 1	Banfield
Rosario Central	1 - 1	Huracán
Platense	1 - 1	Deportivo Español

Fecha 17
Local	Score	Guest
Banfield	0 - 4	Estudiantes
Unión	1 - 1	Colón
Gimnasia (LP)	0 - 0	Lanús
Independiente	2 - 0	San Lorenzo
Vélez Sarsfield	0 - 3	Huracán Corrientes
Newell's Old Boys	1 - 3	River Plate
Ferro Carril Oeste	1 - 1	Racing Club
Boca Juniors	4 - 1	Platense
Huracán	2 - 3	Gimnasia (J)
Deportivo Español	2 - 3	Rosario Central

Fecha 18
Local	Score	Guest
Estudiantes	3 - 1	Huracán
Colón	6 - 0	Banfield
Lanús	0 - 0	Unión
San Lorenzo	1 - 2	Gimnasia (LP)
Huracán Corrientes	3 - 2	Independiente
River Plate	3 - 0	Vélez Sarsfield
Ferro Carril Oeste	0 - 0	Newell's Old Boys
Rosario Central	4 - 2	Boca Juniors
Racing Club	1 - 0	Platense
Gimnasia (J)	1 - 1	Deportivo Español

Fecha 19
Local	Score	Guest
Deportivo Español	2 - 2	Estudiantes
Huracán	0 - 1	Colón
Banfield	0 - 1	Lanús
Unión	2 - 0	San Lorenzo
Gimnasia (LP)	6 - 3	Huracán Corrientes
Independiente	3 - 1	River Plate
Vélez Sarsfield	0 - 2	Ferro Carril Oeste
Newell's Old Boys	1 - 0	Racing Club
Boca Juniors	0 - 1	Gimnasia (J)
Platense	1 - 3	Rosario Central

=== Top scorers ===
Rank.	Player	Team	Goals
1	(Argentina) Gustavo Reggi	Ferro Carril Oeste	11
2	(Argentina) Julio Cruz	River Plate	10
3	(Argentina) Guillermo Barros Schelotto	Gimnasia y Esgrima (LP)	9
3	(Argentina) Martín Cardetti	Rosario Central	9
3	(Uruguay) Rubén Da Silva	Rosario Central	9
3	(Argentina) Fernando Di Carlo	Platense	9

== Torneo Clausura ==
Clausura
- Season: 1997
- Dates: 21 February – 12 August
- Champions: River Plate (28th. title)
- Promoted: Huracán (C); Banfield
- Top goalscorer: (Uruguay) Sergio Martínez (15)
- Biggest home win: Boca Jrs. 6–1 GELP (9 May)
- Biggest away win: Colón 0–6 Independiente (31 May)

=== League standings ===
Pos	Team	Pld	W	D	L	GF	GA	GD	Pts
1	River Plate	19	12	5	2	37	20	+17	41
2	Colón	19	9	8	2	36	28	+8	35
3	Newell's Old Boys	19	10	5	4	23	20	+3	35
4	Independiente	19	9	5	5	38	21	+17	32
5	Vélez Sársfield	19	9	3	7	25	18	+7	30
6	San Lorenzo	19	9	3	7	32	22	+10	30
7	Racing	19	7	6	6	24	22	+2	27
8	Platense	19	6	8	5	21	22	−1	26
9	Boca Juniors	19	6	7	6	34	32	+2	25
10	Ferro Carril Oeste	19	5	9	5	24	22	+2	24
11	Lanús	19	6	6	7	22	21	+1	24
12	Unión	19	6	6	7	31	36	−5	24
13	Gimnasia y Esgrima (LP)	19	6	5	8	19	25	−6	23
14	Huracán	19	5	7	7	22	33	−11	22
15	Huracán (C)	19	4	9	6	21	28	−7	21
16	Estudiantes (LP)	19	5	4	10	22	26	−4	19
17	Deportivo Español	19	4	7	8	19	25	−6	19
18	Rosario Central	19	4	6	9	24	27	−3	18
19	Banfield	19	4	4	11	20	32	−12	16
20	Gimnasia y Esgrima (J)	19	2	8	9	21	35	−14	14

=== Fixtures ===
Fecha 1
Local	Score	Guest
Boca Juniors	2 - 1	Estudiantes
Deportivo Español	1 - 1	Colón
Huracán	0 - 0	Lanús
Banfield	1 - 1	San Lorenzo
Unión	0 - 0	Huracán Corrientes
Gimnasia (LP)	0 - 2	River Plate
Independiente	2 - 2	Ferro Carril Oeste
Vélez Sarsfield	1 - 1	Newell's Old Boys
Rosario Central	5 - 0	Racing Club
Platense	1 - 1	Gimnasia (J)

Fecha 2
Local	Score	Guest
Estudiantes	1 - 2	Platense
Lanús	1 - 2	Deportivo Español
San Lorenzo	5 - 1	Huracán
Huracán Corrientes	1 - 1	Banfield
River Plate	4 - 0	Unión
Ferro Carril Oeste	0 - 0	Gimnasia (LP)
Newell's Old Boys	2 - 1	Independiente
Racing Club	2 - 0	Vélez Sarsfield
Gimnasia (J)	1 - 1	Rosario Central
Colón	1 - 0	Boca Juniors

Fecha 3
Local	Score	Guest
Rosario Central	1 - 0	Estudiantes
Platense	2 - 2	Colón
Boca Juniors	1 - 1	Lanús
Deportivo Español	2 - 3	San Lorenzo
Huracán	1 - 1	Huracán Corrientes
Banfield	0 - 2	River Plate
Unión	2 - 1	Ferro Carril Oeste
Gimnasia (LP)	1 - 0	Newell's Old Boys
Independiente	0 - 3	Vélez Sarsfield
Gimnasia (J)	1 - 2	Racing Club

Fecha 4
Local	Score	Guest
Estudiantes	3 - 2	Gimnasia (J)
Colón	2 - 0	Rosario Central
Lanús	2 - 0	Platense
San Lorenzo	4 - 0	Boca Juniors
Huracán Corrientes	2 - 2	Deportivo Español
River Plate	3 - 0	Huracán
Ferro Carril Oeste	0 - 1	Banfield
Newell's Old Boys	2 - 1	Unión
Vélez Sarsfield	1 - 0	Gimnasia (LP)
Racing Club	1 - 2	Independiente

Fecha 5
Local	Score	Guest
Racing Club	1 - 0	Estudiantes
Gimnasia (J)	1 - 4	Colón
Rosario Central	0 - 0	Lanús
Platense	3 - 1	San Lorenzo
Boca Juniors	4 - 1	Huracán Corrientes
Deportivo Español	1 - 1	River Plate
Huracán	3 - 4	Ferro Carril Oeste
Banfield	2 - 3	Newell's Old Boys
Unión	1 - 0	Vélez Sarsfield
Gimnasia (LP)	2 - 1	Independiente

Fecha 6
Local	Score	Guest
Colón	3 - 1	Estudiantes
Gimnasia (LP)	1 - 0	Racing Club
Lanús	1 - 1	Gimnasia (J)
San Lorenzo	3 - 1	Rosario Central
Huracán Corrientes	1 - 1	Platense
River Plate	3 - 3	Boca Juniors
Ferro Carril Oeste	2 - 1	Deportivo Español
Newell's Old Boys	2 - 0	Huracán
Vélez Sarsfield	2 - 1	Banfield
Independiente	4 - 4	Unión

Fecha 7
Local	Score	Guest
Estudiantes	0 - 0	Lanús
Racing Club	1 - 1	Colón
Unión	2 - 1	Gimnasia (LP)
Gimnasia (J)	2 - 1	San Lorenzo
Rosario Central	0 - 0	Huracán Corrientes
Platense	1 - 2	River Plate
Boca Juniors	1 - 1	Ferro Carril Oeste
Deportivo Español	0 - 1	Newell's Old Boys
Huracán	3 - 1	Vélez Sarsfield
Banfield	0 - 2	Independiente

Fecha 8
Local	Score	Guest
San Lorenzo	0 - 1	Estudiantes
Lanús	3 - 4	Colón
Gimnasia (LP)	3 - 1	Banfield
Unión	1 - 1	Racing Club
Huracán Corrientes	1 - 1	Gimnasia (J)
River Plate	1 - 1	Rosario Central
Ferro Carril Oeste	0 - 1	Platense
Newell's Old Boys	1 - 1	Boca Juniors
Vélez Sarsfield	2 - 1	Deportivo Español
Independiente	2 - 0	Huracán

Fecha 9
Local	Score	Guest
Estudiantes	2 - 2	Huracán Corrientes
Colón	1 - 0	San Lorenzo
Racing Club	1 - 2	Lanús
Huracán	1 - 1	Gimnasia (LP)
Banfield	1 - 2	Unión
Gimnasia (J)	1 - 1	River Plate
Rosario Central	1 - 3	Ferro Carril Oeste
Platense	1 - 2	Newell's Old Boys
Boca Juniors	1 - 2	Vélez Sarsfield
Deportivo Español	1 - 1	Independiente

Fecha 10
Local	Score	Guest
River Plate	1 - 4	Estudiantes
Huracán Corrientes	2 - 2	Colón
San Lorenzo	1 - 0	Lanús
Gimnasia (LP)	0 - 0	Deportivo Español
Unión	5 - 0	Huracán
Banfield	1 - 3	Racing Club
Ferro Carril Oeste	0 - 0	Gimnasia (J)
Newell's Old Boys	0 - 0	Rosario Central
Vélez Sarsfield	0 - 0	Platense
Independiente	2 - 0	Boca Juniors

Fecha 11
Local	Score	Guest
Estudiantes	0 - 1	Ferro Carril Oeste
Colón	5 - 1	River Plate
Lanús	1 - 2	Huracán Corrientes
Racing Club	2 - 0	San Lorenzo
Boca Juniors	6 - 1	Gimnasia (LP)
Deportivo Español	2 - 1	Unión
Huracán	1 - 0	Banfield
Gimnasia (J)	1 - 2	Newell's Old Boys
Rosario Central	0 - 1	Vélez Sarsfield
Platense	0 - 3	Independiente

Fecha 12
Local	Score	Guest
Newell's Old Boys	1 - 0	Estudiantes
Ferro Carril Oeste	2 - 2	Colón
River Plate	3 - 0	Lanús
Huracán Corrientes	0 - 2	San Lorenzo
Gimnasia (LP)	1 - 1	Platense
Unión	3 - 3	Boca Juniors
Banfield	1 - 0	Deportivo Español
Huracán	2 - 2	Racing Club
Vélez Sarsfield	4 - 0	Gimnasia (J)
Independiente	2 - 1	Rosario Central

Fecha 13
Local	Score	Guest
Estudiantes	0 - 3	Vélez Sarsfield
Colón	2 - 2	Newell's Old Boys
Lanús	1 - 1	Ferro Carril Oeste
San Lorenzo	2 - 3	River Plate
Racing Club	2 - 0	Huracán Corrientes
Rosario Central	3 - 3	Gimnasia (LP)
Platense	2 - 0	Unión
Boca Juniors	3 - 1	Banfield
Deportivo Español	0 - 0	Huracán
Gimnasia (J)	1 - 4	Independiente

Fecha 14
Local	Score	Guest
Independiente	2 - 0	Estudiantes
Vélez Sarsfield	1 - 1	Colón
Newell's Old Boys	1 - 0	Lanús
Ferro Carril Oeste	0 - 0	San Lorenzo
River Plate	3 - 1	Huracán Corrientes
Gimnasia (LP)	3 - 2	Gimnasia (J)
Unión	3 - 2	Rosario Central
Banfield	2 - 2	Platense
Huracán	1 - 1	Boca Juniors
Deportivo Español	0 - 2	Racing Club

Fecha 15
Local	Score	Guest
Estudiantes	1 - 0	Gimnasia (LP)
Colón	0 - 6	Independiente
Lanús	3 - 1	Vélez Sarsfield
San Lorenzo	3 - 0	Newell's Old Boys
Huracán Corrientes	2 - 1	Ferro Carril Oeste
Racing Club	1 - 2	River Plate
Gimnasia (J)	2 - 0	Unión
Rosario Central	2 - 0	Banfield
Platense	1 - 3	Huracán
Boca Juniors	1 - 3	Deportivo Español

Fecha 16
Local	Score	Guest
Unión	3 - 3	Estudiantes
Gimnasia (LP)	0 - 1	Colón
Independiente	2 - 0	Lanús
Vélez Sarsfield	1 - 1	San Lorenzo
Newell's Old Boys	2 - 1	Huracán Corrientes
Ferro Carril Oeste	0 - 2	River Plate
Boca Juniors	3 - 2	Racing Club
Banfield	3 - 2	Gimnasia (J)
Huracán	2 - 1	Rosario Central
Deportivo Español	0 - 0	Platense

Fecha 17
Local	Score	Guest
Estudiantes	1 - 1	Banfield
Colón	0 - 0	Unión
Lanús	2 - 1	Gimnasia (LP)
San Lorenzo	1 - 0	Independiente
Huracán Corrientes	0 - 1	Vélez Sarsfield
River Plate	1 - 0	Newell's Old Boys
Racing Club	1 - 1	Ferro Carril Oeste
Platense	1 - 0	Boca Juniors
Gimnasia (J)	1 - 1	Huracán
Rosario Central	1 - 0	Deportivo Español

Fecha 18
Local	Score	Guest
Huracán	1 - 0	Estudiantes
Banfield	3 - 1	Colón
Unión	0 - 4	Lanús
Gimnasia (LP)	1 - 0	San Lorenzo
Independiente	2 - 3	Huracán Corrientes
Vélez Sarsfield	0 - 2	River Plate
Newell's Old Boys	1 - 4	Ferro Carril Oeste
Boca Juniors	4 - 3	Rosario Central
Platense	0 - 0	Racing Club
Deportivo Español	3 - 1	Gimnasia (J)

Fecha 19
Local	Score	Guest
Estudiantes	4 - 0	Deportivo Español
Colón	3 - 2	Huracán
Lanús	1 - 0	Banfield
San Lorenzo	4 - 3	Unión
Huracán Corrientes	1 - 0	Gimnasia (LP)
River Plate	0 - 0	Independiente
Ferro Carril Oeste	1 - 1	Vélez Sarsfield
Racing Club	0 - 0	Newell's Old Boys
Gimnasia (J)	0 - 0	Boca Juniors
Rosario Central	1 - 2	Platense

=== Top scorers ===
Rank.	Player	Team	Goals
1	(Uruguay) Sergio Martínez	Boca Juniors	15
2	(Argentina) José Luis Calderón	Independiente	12
2	(Uruguay) Enzo Francescoli	River Plate	12
3	(Uruguay) Josemir Lujambio	Huracán (C)	11

== Relegation ==
Banfield and Huracán de Corrientes were relegated with the worst points averages.

== See also ==
- 1996–97 in Argentine football
