= 1997–98 Argentine Primera División =

107th season of top-tier football league in Argentina

Primera División
- Season: 1997–98
- Dates: August 22, 1997 – June 8, 1998
- Champions: Apertura: River Plate (29th title); Clausura: Vélez Sársfield (5th title)
- 1999 Copa Libertadores: River Plate; Vélez Sársfield
- 1998 Copa Conmebol: Gimnasia y Esg LP; Rosario Central
- Matches: 380

The 1997–98 Argentine Primera División was the 107th season of top-flight football in Argentina. The season ran from August 22, 1997, to June 8, 1998. Argentinos Juniors (champion of 1996–97 Primera B Nacional) and Gimnasia y Tiro were promoted from Primera B Nacional.

River Plate won the Apertura (29th. league title) while Vélez Sársfield won the Clausura (5th. title). On the other hand, Gimnasia y Tiro and Deportivo Español were relegated with the worst points averages.

Permanent squad numbers were established as mandatory by the AFA, starting in the 1997 Apertura. As the rule did not specify the use of number "1" for goalkeepers exclusively, forward Silvio Carrario wore that number for Deportivo Español.

== Torneo Apertura ==
Apertura
- Season: 1997
- Dates: 22 August – 22 December
- Champions: River Plate (29th. title)
- Promoted: Argentinos Juniors; Gimnasia y Tiro
- Top goalscorer: (Uruguay) Rubén Da Silva (15)
- Biggest home win: Ferro 5–0 GyE (J) (25 Aug); Velez 5–0 Newell's (28 Sep)
- Biggest away win: Unión 0-5 Estudiantes LP (21 Sep)
- Highest scoring: Ferro 6–2 Unión (9 Nov)

=== League standings ===
Pos	Team	Pld	W	D	L	GF	GA	GD	Pts
1	River Plate	19	14	3	2	43	17	+26	45
2	Boca Juniors	19	13	5	1	35	12	+23	44
3	Rosario Central	19	10	5	4	35	20	+15	35
4	Vélez Sársfield	19	8	8	3	42	23	+19	32
5	San Lorenzo	19	9	5	5	42	32	+10	32
6	Gimnasia y Esgrima (LP)	19	9	5	5	33	27	+6	32
7	Independiente	19	9	3	7	29	31	−2	30
8	Argentinos Juniors	19	9	2	8	24	25	−1	29
9	Platense	19	7	7	5	25	26	−1	28
10	Estudiantes (LP)	19	7	5	7	25	24	+1	26
11	Lanús	19	7	4	8	29	30	−1	25
12	Ferro Carril Oeste	19	6	6	7	33	32	+1	24
13	Racing	19	5	6	8	24	28	−4	21
14	Gimnasia y Esgrima (J)	19	5	5	9	25	28	−3	20
15	Colón	19	5	5	9	23	33	−10	20
16	Unión	19	5	5	9	25	43	−18	20
17	Deportivo Español	19	4	5	10	26	43	−17	17
18	Newell's Old Boys	19	3	5	11	22	38	−16	14
19	Huracán	19	3	3	13	20	32	−12	12
20	Gimnasia y Tiro	19	2	6	11	14	30	−16	12

=== Top scorers ===
Rank.	Player	Team	Goals
1	(Uruguay) Rubén Da Silva	Rosario Central	15
2	(Uruguay) Sebastián Abreu	San Lorenzo	13
3	(Argentina) Patricio Camps	Vélez Sarsfield	12
3	(Argentina) Roberto Sosa	Gimnasia y Esgrima (LP)	12

== Torneo Clausura ==
Clausura
- Season: 1998
- Dates: 16 February – 8 June
- Champions: Vélez Sarsfield (5th. title)
- Relegated: Gimnasia y Tiro; Deportivo Español
- Top goalscorer: (Argentina) Roberto Sosa (17)
- Biggest home win: Velez 6–1 Colón (19 Apr); River 5–0 Huracán (8 Mar)
- Biggest away win: D. Español 0–5 Argentinos (30 Mar)

=== League standings ===
Pos	Team	Pld	W	D	L	GF	GA	GD	Pts
1	Vélez Sársfield	19	14	4	1	39	14	+25	46
2	Lanús	19	11	7	1	43	22	+21	40
3	Gimnasia y Esgrima (LP)	19	11	4	4	42	24	+18	37
4	Gimnasia y Esgrima (J)	19	9	5	5	23	20	+3	32
5	San Lorenzo	19	9	3	7	36	27	+9	30
6	Boca Juniors	19	8	5	6	38	30	+8	29
7	River Plate	19	7	8	4	32	24	+8	29
8	Argentinos Juniors	19	7	7	5	26	17	+9	28
9	Newell's Old Boys	19	7	7	5	26	22	+4	28
10	Ferro Carril Oeste	19	6	7	6	32	34	−2	25
11	Independiente	19	6	5	8	26	28	−2	23
12	Estudiantes (LP)	19	6	5	8	16	24	−8	23
13	Rosario Central	19	5	7	7	23	28	−5	22
14	Platense	19	4	9	6	26	27	−1	21
15	Racing	19	5	5	9	15	19	−4	20
16	Colón	19	4	6	9	23	36	−13	18
17	Gimnasia y Tiro	19	4	4	11	17	34	−17	16
18	Huracán	19	3	6	10	18	34	−16	15
19	Unión	19	2	7	10	19	33	−14	13
20	Deportivo Español	19	2	7	10	21	44	−23	13

=== Top scorers ===
Position	Player	Team	Goals
1	Roberto Sosa	Gimnasia y Esgrima (LP)	17
2	Gustavo Bartelt	Lanús	13
3	Martín Palermo	Boca Juniors	12
4	Patricio Camps	Vélez Sársfield	10
4	Martín Posse	Vélez Sársfield	10

== See also ==
- 1997–98 in Argentine football
