= Vazzoler =

Vazzoler is a surname. Notable people with the surname include:

- Elsa Vazzoler (1920–1989), Italian actor
- Francisco Vazzoler (born 1989), Argentine footballer
