= Claudio Mele =

Argentine footballer (born 1968)

Claudio Mele (born 23 January 1968) is an Argentine former professional footballer who played as a goalkeeper for clubs of Argentina and Chile.

== Career ==
- Almirante Brown 1990–1993
- Gimnasia y Tiro de Salta 1993–1995
- Huracán de Corrientes 1995–1997
- Deportes Concepción 1998–1999
- Cobreloa 2000–2002
- Almirante Brown 2003–2004
- Estudiantes de Buenos Aires 2004–2005
