= 1998–99 in Argentine football =

Football in Argentina
- Season: 1998–99

In 1998–99 Boca Juniors were the winners of both league championships in Argentine football.

== Torneo Apertura ("Opening" Tournament) ==
Position	Team	Points	Played	Won	Drawn	Lost	For	Against	Difference
1	Boca Juniors	45	19	13	6	0	45	18	27
2	Gimnasia La Plata	36	19	10	6	3	31	23	8
3	Racing Club	33	19	9	6	4	39	29	10
4	Lanús	30	19	8	6	5	20	20	0
5	Colón de Santa Fe	26	19	7	5	7	28	27	1
6	San Lorenzo	25	19	6	7	6	40	35	5
7	Argentinos Juniors	25	19	5	10	4	31	27	4
8	Newell's Old Boys	25	19	6	7	6	22	21	1
9	Unión de Santa Fe	25	19	6	7	6	32	34	-2
10	Rosario Central	25	19	6	7	6	26	28	-2
11	Vélez Sársfield	24	19	6	6	7	26	26	0
12	Estudiantes de La Plata	24	19	6	6	7	22	23	-1
13	Talleres de Córdoba	24	19	7	3	9	28	33	-5
14	Gimnasia de Jujuy	22	19	4	10	5	31	30	-1
15	River Plate	22	19	5	7	7	27	27	0
16	Independiente	22	19	5	5	9	26	26	0
17	Ferro Carril Oeste	20	19	5	5	9	24	31	-7
18	Huracán	20	19	5	5	9	29	42	-13
19	Belgrano de Córdoba	19	19	4	7	8	22	31	-9
20	Platense	13	19	3	4	12	21	39	-18

=== Top scorers ===
Position	Player	Team	Goals
1	Martín Palermo	Boca Juniors	20
2	Hugo Brizuela	Argentinos Juniors	13
3	Jorge Quinteros	Argentinos Juniors	10

=== Relegation ===
There is no relegation after the Apertura. For the relegation results of this tournament see below

== Torneo Clausura ("Closing" Tournament) ==
Position	Team	Points	Played	Won	Drawn	Lost	For	Against	Difference
1	Boca Juniors	44	19	13	5	1	35	11	24
2	River Plate	37	19	11	4	4	37	19	18
3	San Lorenzo	36	19	10	6	3	33	19	14
4	Rosario Central	32	19	9	5	5	24	20	4
5	Independiente	29	19	8	5	6	32	26	6
6	Unión de Santa Fe	29	19	8	5	6	29	27	2
7	Newell's Old Boys	27	19	7	6	6	30	22	8
8	Gimnasia La Plata	26	19	7	5	7	28	32	-4
9	Belgrano de Córdoba	25	19	6	7	6	20	20	0
10	Gimnasia de Jujuy	25	19	7	4	8	28	37	-9
11	Argentinos Juniors	24	19	6	6	7	20	23	-3
12	Colón de Santa Fe	23	19	6	8	5	28	22	6
13	Vélez Sársfield	22	19	5	7	7	21	24	-3
14	Racing Club	22	19	6	4	9	20	32	-12
15	Estudiantes de La Plata	21	19	4	9	6	18	18	0
16	Talleres	20	19	4	8	7	23	26	-3
17	Lanús	20	19	5	5	9	23	28	-5
18	Platense	17	19	4	5	10	16	30	-14
19	Ferro Carril Oeste	15	19	2	9	8	8	18	-10
20	Huracán	12	19	2	6	11	15	35	-20

=== Top scorers ===
Position	Player	Team	Goals
1	José Luis Calderón	Independiente	17
2	Bernardo Romeo	San Lorenzo	13
3	Martín Palermo	Boca Juniors	12
4	Mario Lobo	Gimnasia La Plata	10

== Relegation ==
=== Relegation table ===
Team	Average	Points	Played	1996-97	1997-98	1998-99
River Plate	1.929	220	114	87	74	58
Boca Juniors	1.859	212	114	50	73	89
Gimnasia de La Plata	1.587	181	114	50	69	62
San Lorenzo	1.578	180	114	57	62	61
Vélez Sársfield	1.570	179	114	55	78	46
Independiente	1.561	178	114	71	56	51
Lanús	1.543	176	114	61	65	50
Rosario Central	1.412	161	114	49	57	47
Argentinos Juniors	1.394	106	76	N/A	57	49
Newell's Old Boys	1.360	155	114	61	42	52
Racing Club	1.360	155	114	59	41	55
Colón de Santa Fe	1.298	148	114	61	38	49
Estudiantes La Plata	1.210	138	114	39	49	45
Gimnasia de Jujuy	1.210	138	114	39	52	47
Talleres de Córdoba	1.158	44	38	N/A	N/A	44
Belgrano de Córdoba	1.158	44	38	N/A	N/A	44
Unión de Santa Fe	1.149	131	114	44	33	54
Ferro Carril Oeste	1.140	130	114	46	39	35
Platense	1.105	126	114	47	49	30
Huracán	0.850	97	114	38	27	32

== Argentine clubs in international competitions ==
Team	CONMEBOL 1998	Copa Mercosur 1998	Copa Libertadores 1999
Rosario Central	Runner up	did not qualify	did not qualify
River Plate	N/A	QF	SF
San Lorenzo	N/A	SF	did not qualify
Vélez Sársfield	N/A	QF	QF
Boca Juniors	N/A	QF	did not qualify
Racing Club	N/A	QF	did not qualify
Independiente	N/A	Group stage	did not qualify
Gimnasia de La Plata	1st round	did not qualify	did not qualify

== National team ==
This section covers Argentina's matches from August 1, 1998, to July 31, 1999.

Win Draw Loss

=== Friendly matches ===
February 4, 1999	Venezuela	0 – 2	Argentina	Maracaibo, Venezuela
		(Report)	Samuel 46'; Gallardo 68'	Stadium: Estadio José Pachencho Romero; Attendance: 30,000; Referee: Fernando Panesso (Colombia)

February 10, 1999	Argentina	1 – 0	Mexico	Los Angeles, United States
	Sorín 67'	(Report)		Stadium: Los Angeles Memorial Coliseum; Attendance: 91,585

March 31, 1999	Netherlands	1 – 1	Argentina	Amsterdam, Netherlands
	Davids 10'	(Report)	Batistuta 84'	Stadium: Amsterdam Arena; Attendance: 51,000; Referee: Graham Poll (England)

June 9, 1999	Mexico	2 – 2	Argentina	Chicago, United States
	Hernández 76'; Chávez 76'	(Report)	Cruz 18'; López 51'	Stadium: Soldier Field

June 13, 1999	United States	1 – 0	Argentina	Washington, D.C., United States
	Moore 88'	(Report)		Stadium: Robert F. Kennedy Memorial Stadium; Attendance: 40,119; Referee: Rodrigo Badilla (Costa Rica)

June 26, 1999	Argentina	0 – 0	Lithuania	Buenos Aires, Argentina
		(Report)		Stadium: José Amalfitani Stadium; Attendance: 11,314; Referee: Daniel Bello (Uruguay)

=== 1999 Copa América ===
July 1, 1999 Group stage	Argentina	3 – 1	Ecuador	Luque, Paraguay
	Simeone 12'; Palermo 53', 61'	(Report)	Kaviedes 77'	Stadium: Estadio Feliciano Cáceres; Attendance: 16,000; Referee: Gilberto Hidalgo (Peru)

July 4, 1999 Group stage	Argentina	0 – 3	Colombia	Luque, Paraguay
		(Report)	Córdoba 10' (pen.); Congo 79'; Montaño 87'	Stadium: Estadio Feliciano Cáceres; Attendance: 20,000; Referee: Ubaldo Aquino (Paraguay)

July 7, 1999 Group stage	Uruguay	0 – 2	Argentina	Luque, Paraguay
		(Report)	González 1'; Palermo 56'	Stadium: Estadio Feliciano Cáceres; Attendance: 20,000; Referee: Masayoshi Okada (Japan)

July 11, 1999 Quarter-finals	Brazil	2 – 1	Argentina	Ciudad del Este, Paraguay
	Rivaldo 32'; Ronaldo 48'	(Report)	Sorín 11'	Stadium: Estadio Antonio Oddone Sarubbi; Attendance: 26,000; Referee: Gustavo Méndez (Uruguay)
