= 1996–97 in Argentine football =

Football in Argentina
- Season: 1996–97

1996–97 in Argentine football saw River Plate win both the Apertura and Clausura championships. Vélez Sársfield won the Recopa Sudamericana and Lanús won the Copa CONMEBOL.

== Torneo Apertura ("Opening" Tournament) ==
Position	Team	Points	Played	Won	Drawn	Lost	For	Against	Difference
1	River Plate	46	19	15	1	3	52	22	30
2	Independiente	37	19	11	4	4	34	22	12
3	Lanús	37	19	10	7	2	23	12	11
4	Racing Club	32	19	9	5	5	31	24	7
5	Rosario Central	31	19	8	7	4	35	28	7
6	Gimnasia La Plata	27	19	7	6	6	21	20	1
7	San Lorenzo	27	19	8	3	8	24	24	0
8	Colón de Santa Fe	26	19	6	8	5	26	24	2
9	Newell's Old Boys	26	19	7	5	7	24	26	-2
10	Boca Juniors	25	19	7	4	8	36	33	3
11	Estudiantes de La Plata	25	19	7	4	8	27	28	-1
12	Gimnasia de Jujuy	25	19	6	7	6	18	19	-1
13	Vélez Sársfield	23	19	6	5	8	29	33	-4
14	Ferro Carril Oeste	22	19	5	7	7	32	34	-2
15	Platense	21	19	5	6	8	25	30	-5
16	Unión de Santa Fe	20	19	5	5	9	24	27	-3
17	Huracán de Corrientes	19	19	4	7	8	31	40	-9
18	Deportivo Español	16	19	2	10	7	18	25	-7
19	Huracán	16	19	3	7	9	21	36	-15
20	Banfield	13	19	3	4	12	14	38	-22

=== Top scorers ===
Position	Player	Team	Goals
1	Gustavo Reggi	Ferro Carril Oeste	11
2	Julio Cruz	River Plate	10
3	Guillermo Barros Schelotto	Gimnasia La Plata	9
3	Martín Cardetti	Rosario Central	9
3	Rubén Da Silva	Rosario Central	9
3	Fernando Di Carlo	Platense	9

== Torneo Clausura ("Closing" Tournament) ==
Position	Team	Points	Played	Won	Drawn	Lost	For	Against	Difference
1	River Plate	41	19	12	5	2	37	20	17
2	Colón de Santa Fe	35	19	9	8	2	36	28	8
3	Newell's Old Boys	35	19	10	5	4	23	20	3
4	Independiente	34	19	9	5	5	38	21	17
5	Vélez Sársfield	32	19	9	3	7	25	18	7
6	San Lorenzo	30	19	9	3	7	32	22	10
7	Racing Club	27	19	7	6	6	24	22	2
8	Platense	26	19	6	8	5	21	22	-1
9	Boca Juniors	25	19	6	7	6	34	32	2
10	Ferro Carril Oeste	24	19	5	9	5	24	22	2
11	Lanús	24	19	6	6	7	22	21	1
12	Unión de Santa Fe	24	19	6	6	7	31	36	-5
13	Gimnasia La Plata	23	19	6	5	8	19	25	-6
14	Huracán	22	19	5	7	7	22	33	-11
15	Huracán de Corrientes	21	19	4	9	6	21	28	-7
16	Estudiantes de La Plata	19	19	5	4	10	22	26	-4
17	Deportivo Español	19	19	4	7	8	19	25	-6
18	Rosario Central	18	19	4	6	9	24	27	-3
19	Banfield	16	19	4	4	11	20	32	-12
20	Gimnasia de Jujuy	14	19	2	8	9	21	35	-14

=== Top scorers ===
Position	Player	Team	Goals
1	Sergio Martínez	Boca Juniors	15
2	José Luis Calderón	Independiente	12
2	Enzo Francescoli	River Plate	12
4	Josemir Lujambio	Huracán de Corrientes	10

== Relegation ==
Banfield and Huracán de Corrientes were relegated with the worst points averages.

== Argentine clubs in international competitions ==
Team	Intercontinental	Recopa 1996	Supercopa 1996	CONMEBOL 1996	Copa Libertadores 1997
Vélez Sársfield	N/A	Champions	Champions	N/A	2nd round
Lanús	N/A	N/A	N/A	Champions	did not qualify
River Plate	Runner up	Runner up	1st round	N/A	Round 2
Racing Club	N/A	N/A	1st round	N/A	SF
Rosario Central	N/A	N/A	N/A	SF	did not qualify
Boca Juniors	N/A	N/A	QF	did not qualify	did not qualify
Argentinos	N/A	N/A	1st round	did not qualify	did not qualify
Estudiantes	N/A	N/A	1st round	did not qualify	did not qualify
Independiente	N/A	N/A	1st round	did not qualify	did not qualify
