= Gustavo Reggi =

Argentine footballer

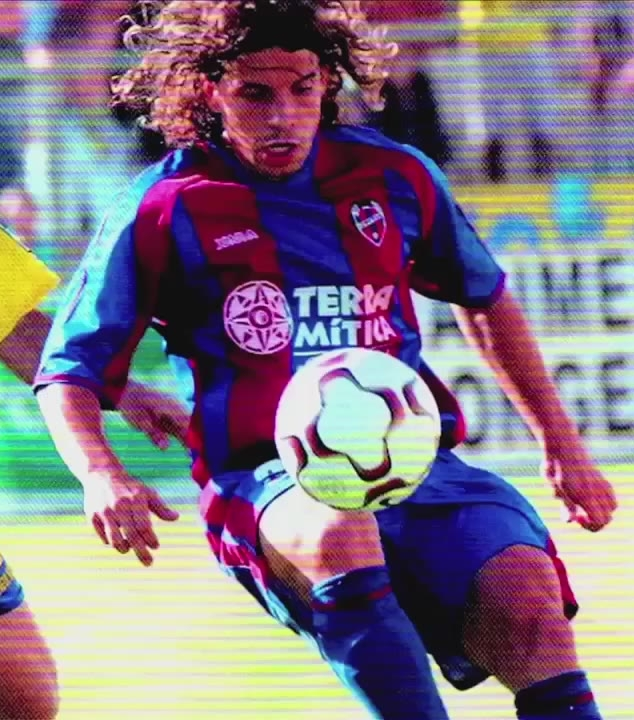
- Reggi in 2011

Personal information
- Full name: Gustavo Enrique Reggi
- Date of birth: 28 May 1973 (age 53)
- Place of birth: San Martín, Argentina
- Height: 1.86 m (6 ft 1 in)
- Position: Striker

Youth career
- San Martín Mendoza

Senior career*
Years	Team	Apps	(Gls)
1996–1997	Ferro Carril Oeste	27	(15)
1997–1998	Independiente	30	(7)
1998–1999	Gimnasia La Plata	20	(0)
1999–2001	Reggina	23	(1)
2001	→ Crotone (loan)	7	(3)
2002	Unión Santa Fe	23	(4)
2002–2003	Las Palmas	38	(11)
2003–2007	Levante	98	(20)
2007–2008	Castellón	26	(2)
2009	Quilmes	6	(1)
2009–2014	San Martín Mendoza		
Total		298	(50)
- * Club domestic league appearances and goals

Gustavo Enrique Reggi (born 28 May 1973) is an Argentine former footballer who played as a striker.

He played for six clubs in his country, also having abroad spells in Italy (two-and-a-half years) and Spain (six-and-a-half), competing in both major levels in both nations.

== Football career ==
Reggi made a name for himself after becoming the Argentine Primera División top scorer in 1996, netting 15 goals for Ferro Carril Oeste in the Apertura but with the Caballito-based team only ranking in 14th position, however. He subsequently represented, in one-season spells each, Club Atlético Independiente and Club de Gimnasia y Esgrima La Plata.

In 1999, 26-year-old Reggi moved abroad and signed with Reggina Calcio in Italy, suffering relegation from Serie A in his second year, which he finished on loan to another club in the country, Serie B's F.C. Crotone. He made his debut in the former competition on 29 August 1999, away against Juventus FC (1–1 draw).

Reggi returned to his homeland in January 2002 with Unión de Santa Fe, moving shortly after to Spain where he would remain for the following seven seasons. He started out at UD Las Palmas in Segunda División, scoring 11 goals for the Canary Islands side and bettering it to 12 in the following campaign, in which he helped Levante UD return to La Liga after a 39-year absence.

Reggi made his Spanish top flight debut on 29 August 2004, starting (one of only five during the season) in a 1–1 draw at Real Sociedad, with the Valencians being immediately relegated back. He again competed with the team in the main division in 2006–07, being again almost exclusively used as a substitute and scoring three goals as this time they managed to stay afloat.

Still in Spain, Reggi moved to CD Castellón in the second division for the 2007–08, signing on 11 August 2007 shortly after being released by Levante. After not being used at all during the first part of the following campaign he decided to terminate his contract, returning to Argentina and playing out the remainder of his career in the lower leagues, his first stop being Quilmes Atlético Club and the second San Martín de Mendoza, where he played until the age of 41 before retiring to become a football coordinator.
