= Pablo Bezombe =

Argentine footballer

Personal information
- Full name: Pablo Marcelo Bezombe Boaglio
- Date of birth: 4 June 1971 (age 55)
- Place of birth: Santa Fe, Argentina
- Height: 1.68 m (5 ft 6 in)
- Position: Midfielder

Senior career*
Years	Team	Apps	(Gls)
1993	Newell's Old Boys	4	(0)
1994	Santiago Wanderers	0	(0)
1995–1998	Unión	88	(14)
1998–1999	Racing Club	34	(7)
1999	Morelia	16	(2)
2000–2001	Estudiantes (LP)	12	(0)
2002	Deportivo Italchacao	14	(1)
2003	Itala San Marco	0	(0)
2003–2004	Belgrano de Córdoba	25	(2)
2004–2005	Tiro Federal	15	(1)
2005–2006	Oggiono	0	(0)
2006–2008	Central Córdoba	62	(25)
2008–2009	Tiro Federal	36	(8)
2009–2010	Central Córdoba		
- * Club domestic league appearances and goals

Pablo Marcelo Bezombe (born 4 June 1971 in Santa Fe) is a retired Argentine football midfielder. Bezombe began his career with Newell's Old Boys, making his debut against Independiente on 7 March 1993. In July 1999, Bezombe joined Mexican Primera División side Monarcas Morelia.
