= Francisco Vazzoler =

Argentine footballer

Personal information
- Full name: Francisco Vazzoler
- Date of birth: 22 April 1989 (age 37)
- Place of birth: Esperanza, Argentina
- Height: 1.87 m (6 ft 1 1/2 in)
- Position: Forward

Youth career
- Vélez Sarsfield
- Unión Santa Fe

Senior career*
Years	Team	Apps	(Gls)
2010–2011	Unión Santa Fe	3	(0)
2011	Racing de Olavarría	10	(1)
2012	Blooming	6	(1)
2012–2013	Racing de Olavarría	27	(5)
2013–2014	Gimnasia y Tiro	33	(6)
2015–2016	Colegiales	60	(15)
2016–2017	Platense	33	(5)
2017–2018	Defensores de Belgrano	27	(11)
2018	Chacarita Juniors	11	(1)
2019–2020	Deportes Copiapó	30	(8)
- * Club domestic league appearances and goals as of 29 October 2020

Francisco Vazzoler (born 22 April 1989) is an Argentine professional footballer who plays as a forward.

== Career ==
Vazzoler began his career in the ranks of Unión Santa Fe, making his professional debut in April 2010 after featuring for the final twenty minutes of a 3–0 defeat to San Martín. Two more appearances fell his way during the 2009–10 Primera B Nacional season. After not playing for the club in 2010–11, Vazzoler left them to join Torneo Argentino A's Racing de Olavarría. Ten games and one goal followed in six months, which preceded the forward joining Blooming of the Bolivian Primera División in January 2012. His first appearance came against Aurora on 29 January, with his first goal arriving on 8 February versus Guabirá.

Vazzoler rejoined Racing de Olavarría in July 2012, subsequently participating in thirty-one fixtures and scoring eight times during 2012–13. Vazzoler had a two-season stint with Torneo Argentino A side Gimnasia y Tiro between 2013 and 2014, before spending the next two years with Colegiales in Primera B Metropolitana. He scored in eleven fixtures in his debut season of 2015, prior to netting four in 2016. Vazzoler agreed to sign for Platense on 17 July 2016, which was followed by a season with fellow third tier outfit Defensores de Belgrano a year later. He made sixty-seven appearances and scored sixteen goals for those teams.

August 2018 saw Vazzoler join Chacarita Juniors in Primera B Nacional, a league his former two teams won promotion to in the previous campaign. He scored his first goal for Chacarita Juniors during his first start on 22 September, netting the winner in a 2–1 win over Villa Dálmine. Vazzoler terminated his contract with the club at the end of the year, subsequently moving to Chile to join Deportes Copiapó.

== Career statistics ==
As of 6 January 2019.

Club statistics
Club	Season	League			Cup (Note: Includes the Copa Argentina)		League Cup		Continental		Other		Total	
Club	Season	Division	Apps	Goals	Apps	Goals	Apps	Goals	Apps	Goals	Apps	Goals	Apps	Goals
Unión Santa Fe	2009–10	Primera B Nacional	3	0	0	0	—		—		0	0	3	0
Unión Santa Fe	2010–11	Primera B Nacional	0	0	0	0	—		—		0	0	0	0
Unión Santa Fe	Total		3	0	0	0	—		—		0	0	3	0
Racing de Olavarría	2011–12	Torneo Argentino A	10	1	0	0	—		—		0	0	10	1
Blooming	2011–12	Primera División	6	1	—		—		—		0	0	6	1
Racing de Olavarría	2012–13	Torneo Argentino A	27	5	1	3	—		—		3 (Note: Three appearances in the 2012–13 Torneo Argentino A play-offs)	0	31	8
Gimnasia y Tiro	2013–14	Torneo Argentino A	27	5	1	0	—		—		2 (Note: Two appearances in the 2013–14 Torneo Argentino A play-offs)	1 (Note: One goal in the 2013–14 Torneo Argentino A play-offs)	30	6
Gimnasia y Tiro	2014	Torneo Federal A	6	1	1	0	—		—		0	0	7	1
Gimnasia y Tiro	Total		33	6	2	0	—		—		2	1	37	7
Colegiales	2015	Primera B Metropolitana	41	11	0	0	—		—		0	0	41	11
Colegiales	2016	Primera B Metropolitana	19	4	0	0	—		—		0	0	19	4
Colegiales	Total		60	15	0	0	—		—		0	0	60	15
Platense	2016–17	Primera B Metropolitana	33	5	0	0	—		—		1 (Note: One appearance in the 2016–17 Primera B Metropolitana play-offs)	0	34	5
Defensores de Belgrano	2017–18	Primera B Metropolitana	27	11	0	0	—		—		5 (Note: Five appearances in the 2017–18 Primera B Metropolitana play-offs)	0	33	11
Chacarita Juniors	2018–19	Primera B Nacional	11	1	0	0	—		—		0	0	11	1
Deportes Copiapó	2019	Primera B	0	0	0	0	—		—		0	0	0	0
Career total			211	45	3	3	—		—		11	1	225	49

== Personal life ==
His older brother, Nicolás Vazzoler, is a football coach who has mainly worked as an assistant. They have run into at Chilean Primera B side Deportes Copiapó on 2020.
