= Josemir Lujambio =

Uruguayan footballer (born 1971)

Personal information
- Full name: Josemir Lujambio Llanes
- Date of birth: 25 September 1971 (age 55)
- Place of birth: Durazno, Uruguay
- Height: 1.75 m (5 ft 9 in)
- Position: Striker

Senior career*
Years	Team	Apps	(Gls)
1992	Defensor	?	(?)
1993	Bella Vista	?	(?)
1994	Maritimo	?	(?)
1995	Sud América	?	(?)
1995–1997	Huracán de Corrientes	55	(27)
1997–1998	Newell's Old Boys	32	(6)
1998	Rayo Vallecano	6	(0)
1999	C.A. Peñarol	6	(0)
1999–2001	Belgrano	61	(17)
2001–2002	Banfield	30	(17)
2002–2003	Querétaro FC	35	(10)
2003–2004	Club Celaya	27	(12)
2004–2005	Instituto	14	(9)
2005–2007	Banfield	42	(15)
2007–2008	Olimpo	32	(10)
2008–2009	Atlético Tucumán	17	(5)

International career^{‡}
1997	Uruguay	5	(0)
- * Club domestic league appearances and goals as of 09:33, 3 October 2009 (UTC) ‡ National team caps and goals as of May 2007 (UTC)

Josemir Lujambio Llanes (born 25 September 1971 in Durazno) is a retired Uruguayan football striker.

== Club career ==
Lujambio played for nineteen clubs in five countries. He started his career at Defensor in 1992. He moved to Bella Vista, in 1993, before moving to Venezuela in 1994 to play for Maritimo. In 1995, he moved back to Uruguay to play for Sud América and that same year he moved to Argentina to play for Huracán de Corrientes where he stayed until 1997, when he moved to Newell's Old Boys.

A move to Spain followed in 1998 to play for Rayo Vallecano, before moving back to Uruguay in 1999 to play for Peñarol. He then moved to Argentina again this time to play for Belgrano where he stayed until 2001, when he moved to Banfield. In 2002, he moved to Mexico where he played first for Querétaro FC and then in 2003 for and Club Celaya. In 2005, he once again returned to Argentina to play again for Banfield, and later in 2007 moved to Olimpo.

In 2008, he joined Atlético Tucumán of the Argentine 2nd division where he was part of the squad that won the 2008–09 championship.

== International career ==
Lujambio made five appearances for Uruguay in 1997.

== Honours ==
Atlético Tucumán

- Primera B Nacional: 2008–09
