= Estadio José Antonio Romero Feris =

Football stadium in Corrientes, Argentina

Romero Feris Stadium
- Estadio Romero Feris
- Interactive map of Romero Feris Stadium
- Full name: Estadio José Antonio Romero Feris
- Address: Av. Sarmiento 2201; Corrientes; Argentina
- Owner: C.A. Huracán (C)
- Capacity: 14,000
- Type: Stadium
- Surface: Grass
- Field size: 98 x 69 m

Construction
- Opened: 26 July 1986; 40 years ago

Tenants
- Huracán (C) (1986–present); Boca Unidos; Deportivo Mandiyú; Textil Mandiyú

Estadio José Antonio Romero Feris is a football stadium located in the city of Corrientes in the homonymous province of Argentina. It is owned and operated by local C.A. Huracán and was opened in 1986. The stadium has a capacity of 14,000 spectators.

Apart from Huracán, other clubs of Corrientes have used the stadium to host their home football matches, some of they are Boca Unidos, Deportivo Mandiyú, and Textil Mandiyú.

The stadium was named after José Romero Feris, a politician with a long career who served as Governor of the province (1983–87), and Senator of Argentina (1987–2001) among other positions. Romero Feris also served as president of Huracán and was promotor of its construction.

Located in the Barrio Berón de Astrada of Corrientes, the stadium was inaugured on 26 July 2016, in a 1986–87 Primera B Nacional match between Deportivo Mandiyú and Deportivo Armenio that resulted in a scoreless tie. Then President of the Argentine Football Association, Julio Grondona, kicked off the match.
