= Silvio Carrario =

Argentine footballer and manager

Personal information
- Full name: Silvio Rene Carrario
- Date of birth: August 31, 1971 (age 55)
- Place of birth: Bell Ville, Argentina
- Height: 1.77 m (5 ft 10 in)
- Position: Striker

Senior career*
Years	Team	Apps	(Gls)
1993–1994	Central Córdoba	33	(16)
1994–1995	Talleres	30	(11)
1995–1996	Racing	13	(6)
1996–1997	Boca Juniors	6	(0)
1997	Unión de Santa Fe	11	(2)
1997–1998	Deportivo Español	28	(13)
1998–2002	Chacarita Juniors	58	(18)
2002	Italchacao	11	(4)
2002–2003	Olimpo	37	(7)
2003	Lanús	10	(4)
2004	Quilmes	45	(11)
2005	Argentinos Juniors	32	(11)
2006	Quilmes	19	(7)
2006–2007	Olimpo	35	(5)
2007	Aldosivi	12	(0)
2008	Bolívar	8	(0)

Managerial career
- 2008–2009: Central Córdoba
- * Club domestic league appearances and goals as of 2009

Silvio René Carrario (born August 31, 1971, in Bell Ville, Córdoba Province) is an Argentine football manager and former player.

Carrario first played for Central Córdoba before moving to Talleres de Córdoba in 1994. A season later he transferred to Racing Club for one season, played a few games for Boca Juniors in 1996, and half season for Unión de Santa Fe in 1997. That year, he played for Deportivo Español, and at the end of the 1997–98 season moved to Chacarita Juniors, where he played until 2002. The following season he played for Venezuelan Deportivo Italchaco.

Carrario returned to Argentina to play for Olimpo in the 2002–03 season. In 2003, he played a few games for Lanús, for Quilmes in 2004, Argentinos Juniors in 2005, and returned to Quilmes in 2006.

In 2006–07, Olimpo de Bahía Blanca of the Argentine where he won the Apertura 2006 and Clausura 2007 2nd Division titles to help Olimpo win promotion to the Argentine Primera División.

He then joined Club Atlético Aldosivi of the Primera B Nacional in 2007 and Bolivian club Bolívar in 2008.

His is often called Tweety Carrario, named after the Tweety Bird.
