= Estadio Don León Kolbowski =

Football stadium in Buenos Aires, Argentina

Don León Kolbowski Stadium
- Estadio Don León Kolbowski
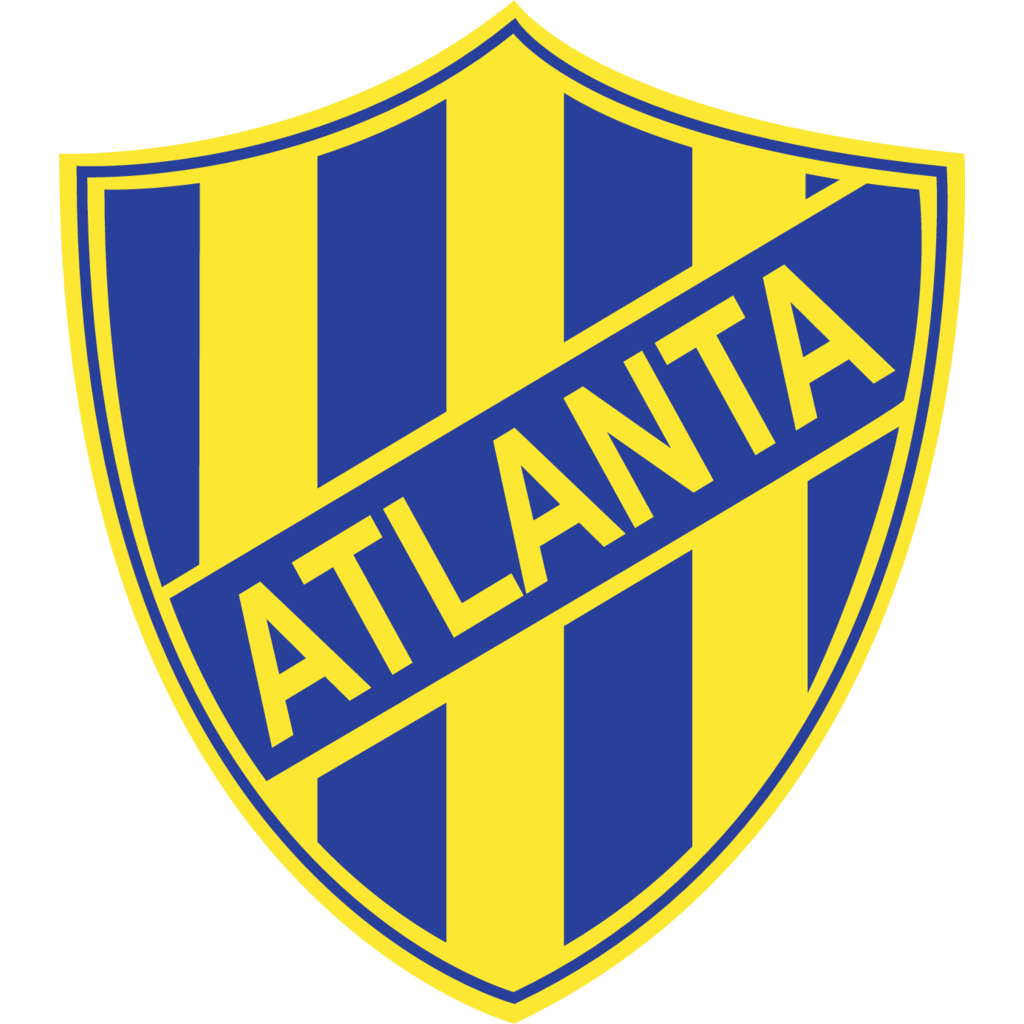

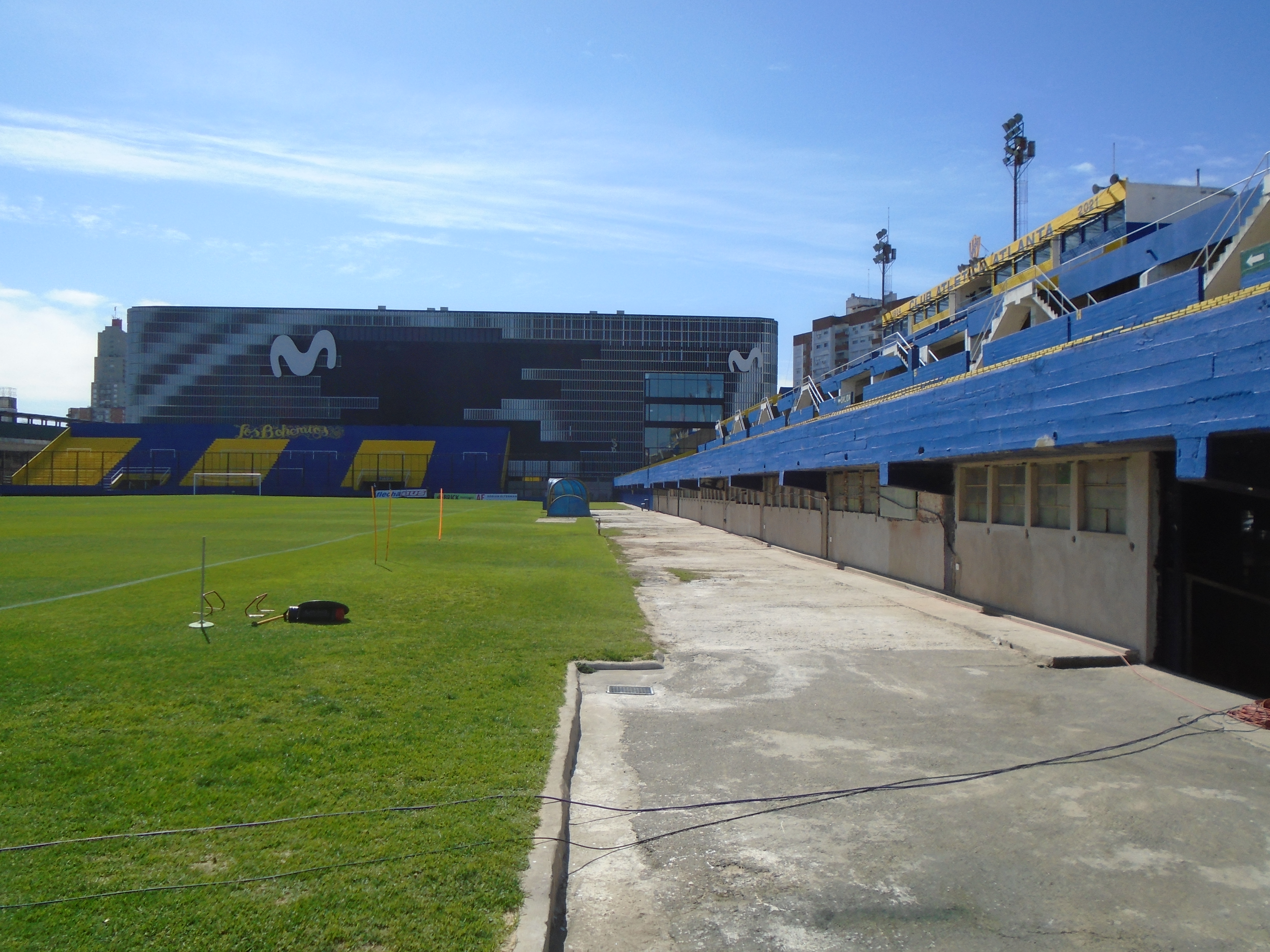
- The stadium in 2021
- Interactive map of Don León Kolbowski Stadium
- Location: Villa Crespo, Buenos Aires, Argentina
- Coordinates: 34°35′42″S 58°26′57″W
- Owner: C.A. Atlanta
- Capacity: 18,000
- Surface: Grass
- Field size: 105 x 68 m

Construction
- Opened: May 5, 1960
- Renovated: 2009, 2022

Tenant
- Atlanta (1960–present)

Website
- caatlanta.com.ar/estadio

Estadio Don León Kolbowski is a football stadium located in Villa Crespo, Buenos Aires, Argentina. Owned and operated by Club Atlético Atlanta, it is currently used mostly for football matches. Built in 1960, the stadium is able to hold 18,000 people.

The stadium was named in 2000 to honor León Kolbowski, president of Club Atlanta from 1959 to 1969. The stadium was built under his administration.

In February 2005, the stadium was closed by the Government of Buenos Aires due to its poor safety conditions. As a result, the club committed to build concrete grandstands to replace the wooden-built seats. By the end of 2009, the stadium was reopened although it was only allowed to host 14,000 spectators, less than half of its real capacity.

== History ==
Prior to the stadium, Club Atlanta had fields on the Parque Chacabuco (in the homonymous neighborhood) between 1909 and 1918. When the club left that field, the football team played their home games at Ferro Carril Oeste Stadium. From 1920 to 1921 Atlanta moved to Club Banco Nación stadium on Carrasco street in Floresta, field previously used by Asociación Atlética Eureka (then merged to Sportivo Palermo).

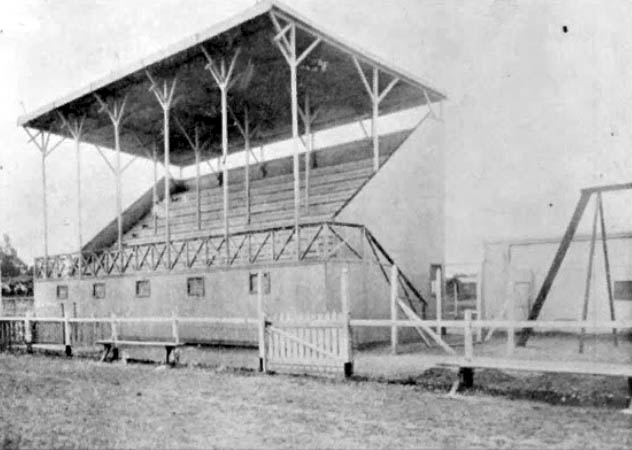
The first Atlanta stadium, nicknamed El Cajoncito, pictured in 1922

In 1922, Atlanta bought a field on Humboldt street in Villa Crespo, where the club built a stadium with an official grandstand. That stadium was later renovated, expanding its capacity with the construction of three grandstands else. Because of its dimensions and shape, the stadium was nicknamed El Cajoncito (the small box). In 1932, arch-rival club Chacarita Juniors built a stadium just behind the Atlanta's one. Chacariereta played there until 1944, when the club was evicted and the stadium structure dismantled.

After the Chacarita stadium was dismantled, the "Compañía de Tierras de Villa Crespo" acquired the vacate land to give it to Club Atlanta with the purpose of building a new stadium there. Atlanta signed a contract with the Land Company while the team continued playing at El Cajoncito during that period. Construction of the new venue started in August 1958. In June 1959 the Municipality of Buenos Aires closed the old stadium due to structural and hygiene deficiences, alleging it was not able to host matches. The last match hosted there was Atlanta 1–0 Ferro C. Oeste on June 21, 1959.

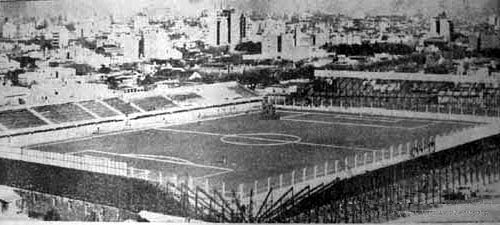
Estadio León Kolbovski in 1960, the year it was inaugurated

As Club Atlanta was not capable of raising the stadium closure, members of the club voted to move all the materials from the old venue to the new land acquired by Compañía de Tierras to build a new venue there, with concrete-built stands. The new stadium was inaugurated on June 5, 1960, with a capacity for 34,000 spectators. Due to its location and modern structure, the Atlanta stadium was a regular venue for several AFA competitions, such as the 1970 Copa Argentina Final. In 1963, a lighting system was placed, then replaced by a more modern one, of six towers.

The stadium was re-opened after 3 years of both an AFA suspension and renovations, on 29 March 2009, after the Buenos Aires Justice department had ordered the stadium to close, due to an altercation between Atlanta and All Boys supporters in a match during 2006. A condition was made that saw the club replace the old wooden terracing before being allowed back. Atlanta had played their home games at various stadiums, including Estadio Ciudad de Vicente López (home of Club Atlético Platense) and Ferro Carril Oeste Stadium, during this lapse.
