= Estadio La Ciudadela =

Football stadium in Tucumán, Argentina

Coordinates: 26°50′11″S 65°13′47″W

La Ciudadela Stadium
- Estadio La Ciudadela
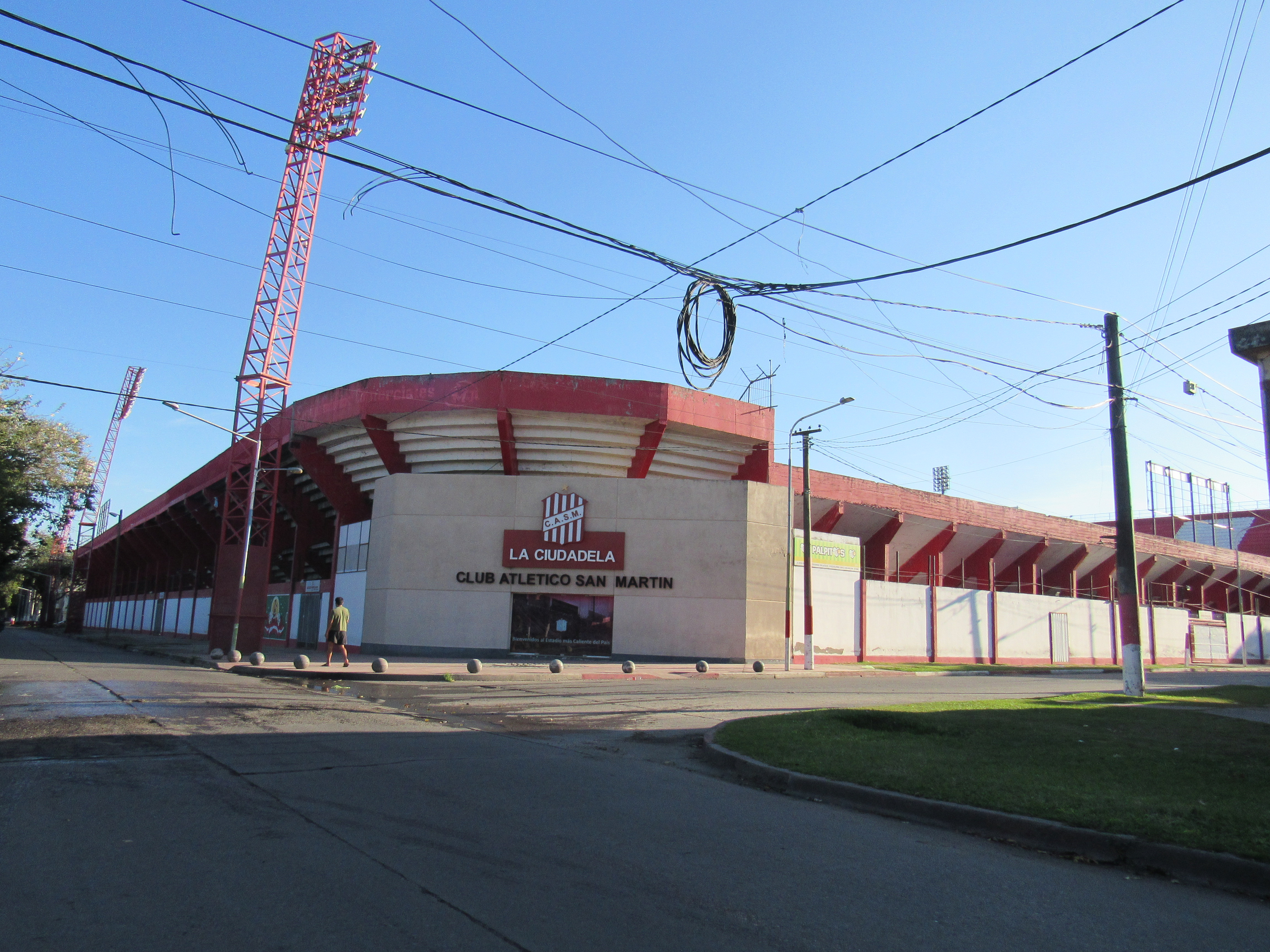
- The stadium in 2023
- Interactive map of La Ciudadela Stadium
- Address: Simón Bolívar 1960; Tucumán; Argentina
- Owner: C.A. San Martín
- Capacity: 30,250
- Surface: Grass
- Field size: 110 x 95 m

Construction
- Opened: March 24, 1932; 94 years ago
- Renovated: 1977, 1993, 2017

Tenant
- C.A. San Martín

Website
- clubatleticosanmartin.com.ar/estadio

Estadio La Ciudadela is a football stadium located in the Ciudadela district of San Miguel de Tucumán, Argentina. Inaugurated in 1932, the stadium is owned and operated by C.A. San Martín and has a capacity 30,250 people.

== History ==
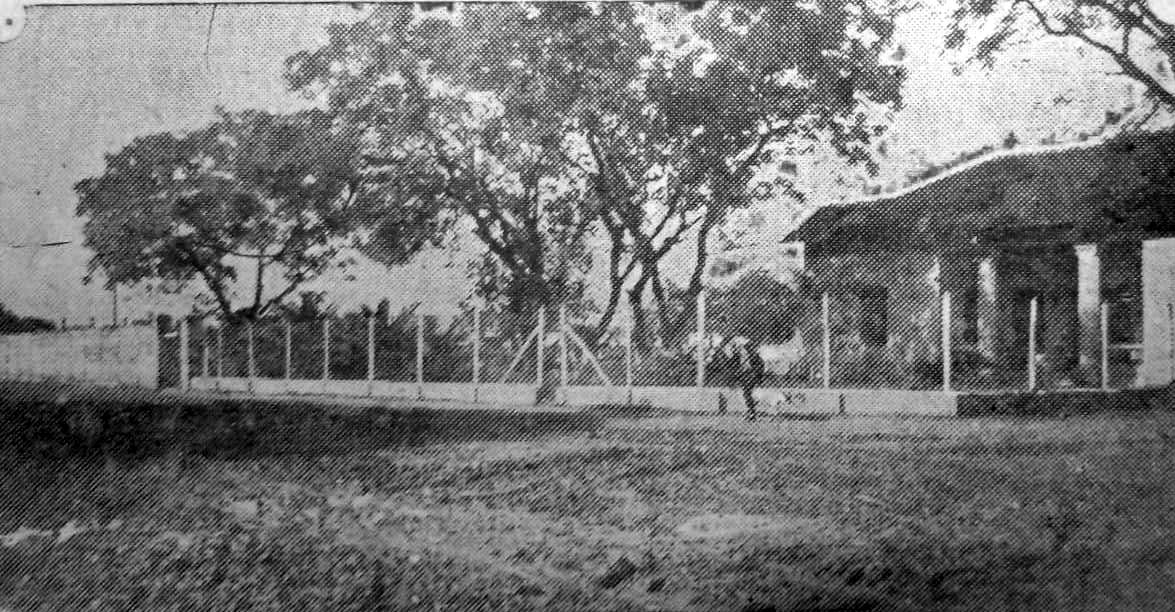
The first stadium of San Martín, dismantled in 1930

San Martín had played in lent or rented venues, such as "Plaza de los Burros" (where the club was evicted), Gimnasio Sport (on Avenida Sarmiento and Laprida), the Sáenz Peña Gym, among others. In 1922, the club acquired a land on Bolívar and Alberdi streets. A house located on one of the land's corners, was refurbished and used as locker room. This first own venue was inaugurated on 6 July 1924 in a friendly match vs River Plate.

Nevertheless, the global economic crisis due to Wall Street crash of 1929 caused San Martín dismantled their venue and then sold the land to pay debts.

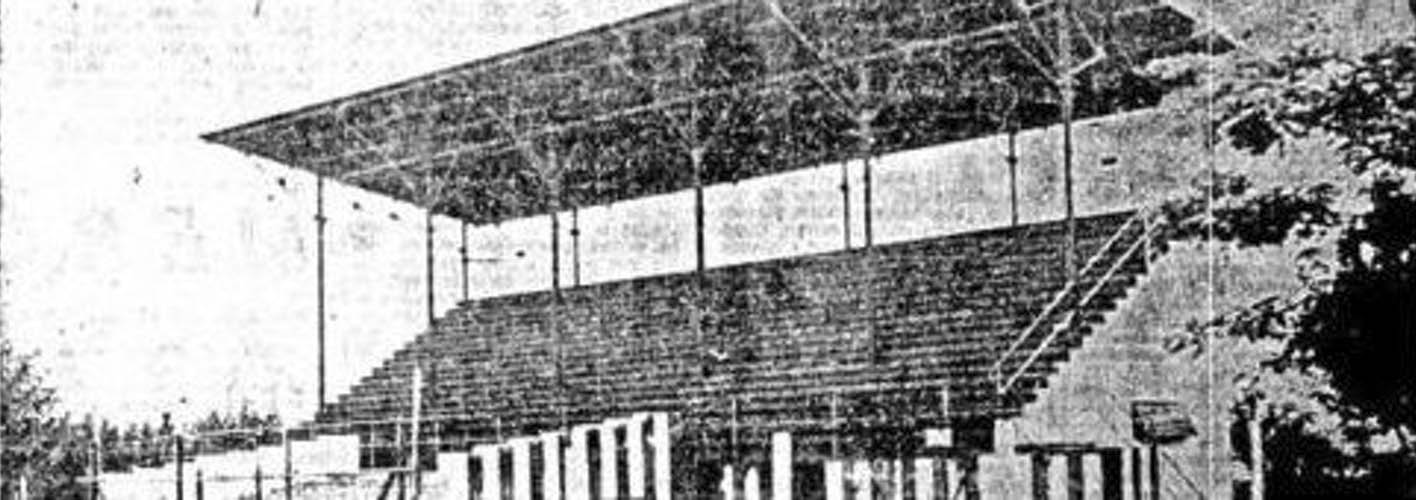
Estadio La Ciudadela during its first years, with the metallic grandstand

After searching for a new location (farest from the downtown), the club set in the Ciudadela neighborhood. The first official match in Ciudadela was played on 24 March 1932 in a friendly match vs Uruguayan side Uruguay Postal. The stadium had two grandstands, one made of wood, and the other was a "metallic" stand. The president of San Martín that opened the stadium was Francisco Sanjuán.

With Ernesto García as president in the 1960s, the north and south stalls were built. Other works in those years included the installation of a lighting system, inaugurated in a 1968 Torneo Nacional match vs San Lorenzo de Almagro. In the 1970s, the stadium increased its capacity with the expansion of the grandstands. The stadium has further expansions in early 1990s.
