= Estadio Eduardo Gallardón =

Football stadium in Lomas de Zamora, Argentina

Eduardo Gallardón Stadium
- Estadio Eduardo Gallardón
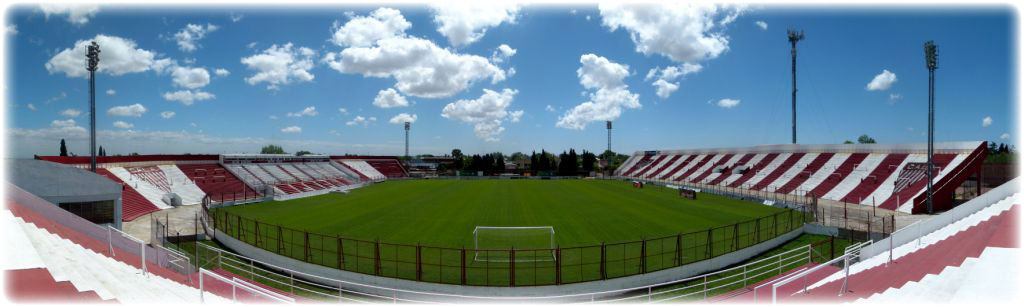
- The stadium in 2012
- Interactive map of Eduardo Gallardón Stadium
- Former names: Estadio de Los Andes (1940–80)
- Address: Av. Santa Fe 287; Lomas de Zamora; Argentina
- Coordinates: 34°45′19″S 58°25′12″W
- Owner: C.A. Los Andes
- Capacity: 38,000
- Surface: Grass
- Field size: 108 x 75 m

Construction
- Opened: September 28, 1940
- Renovated: 2013
- Expanded: 1951, 1992

Tenant
- C.A. Los Andes

Website
- losandesoficial.com/estadio

Estadio Eduardo Gallardón is a football stadium in the city of Lomas de Zamora, Argentina. Opened in 1940, it is owned by Club Atlético Los Andes, which uses it to host their home matches. The stadium has a capacity of near 38,000 people.

== History ==
The stadium was inaugurated on 28 September 1940, in a match where Los Andes defeated Temperley 2–1. The club had acquired the land for m$n35,000, with money loaned by Banco Avellaneda and taken by the club members themselves at m$n500 each one. Originally, the stadium had only a concrete grandstand with capacity for 5,000 spectators.

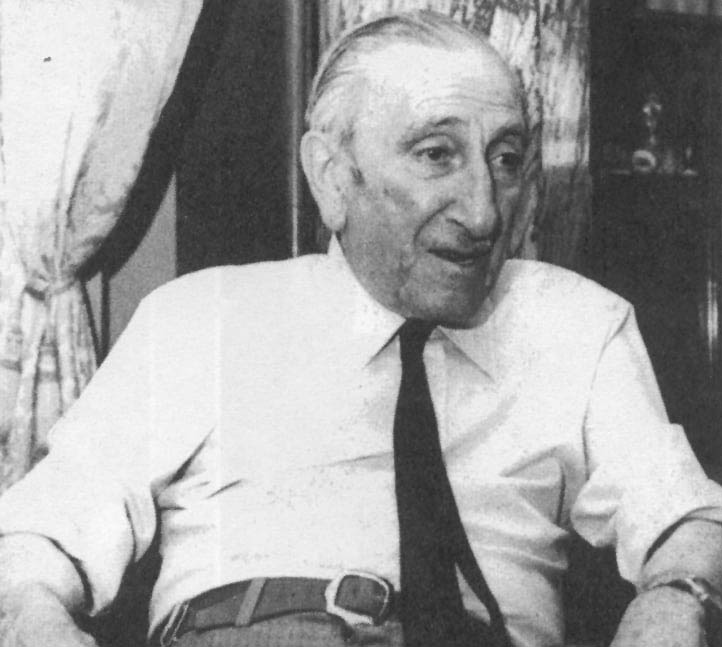
Eduardo Gallardón, club founder and then president. The stadium was named after him in 1980

In 1951, the stadium expanded its facilities with the addition of 21 stands, then placing the stalls to increase its capacity to 17,000 people. After Los Andes promoted to Primera División in 1960, two main grandstands were built, being inaugurated on May 12, 1962. The stadium had no name until 1980, when it was named "Eduardo Gallardón" as a tribute to whom was founder (at 17 years old) and then president of C.A. Los Andes. Gallardón (3 May 1900–?) is also regarded as the most prominent personality in the history of the club.

The stadium stalls were refurbished in 1992, also building a pit surrounding the pitch. When Los Andes promoted to Primera in 2000, the Eduardo Gallardón was refurbished again. While works were in progress, Los Andes played their home matches at C.A. Lanús Stadium.

A new lighting system was inaugurated in 2013, during a Primera B Metropolitana match vs San Telmo. Works –which had a total cost of AR$1 million– consisted in placing 24 new LED devices of 2,000 watts each.
