= Estadio El Gigante del Norte =

Football stadium in Salta, Argentina

El Gigante del Norte Stadium
- Estadio El Gigante del Norte
- Monumental de la Vicente López
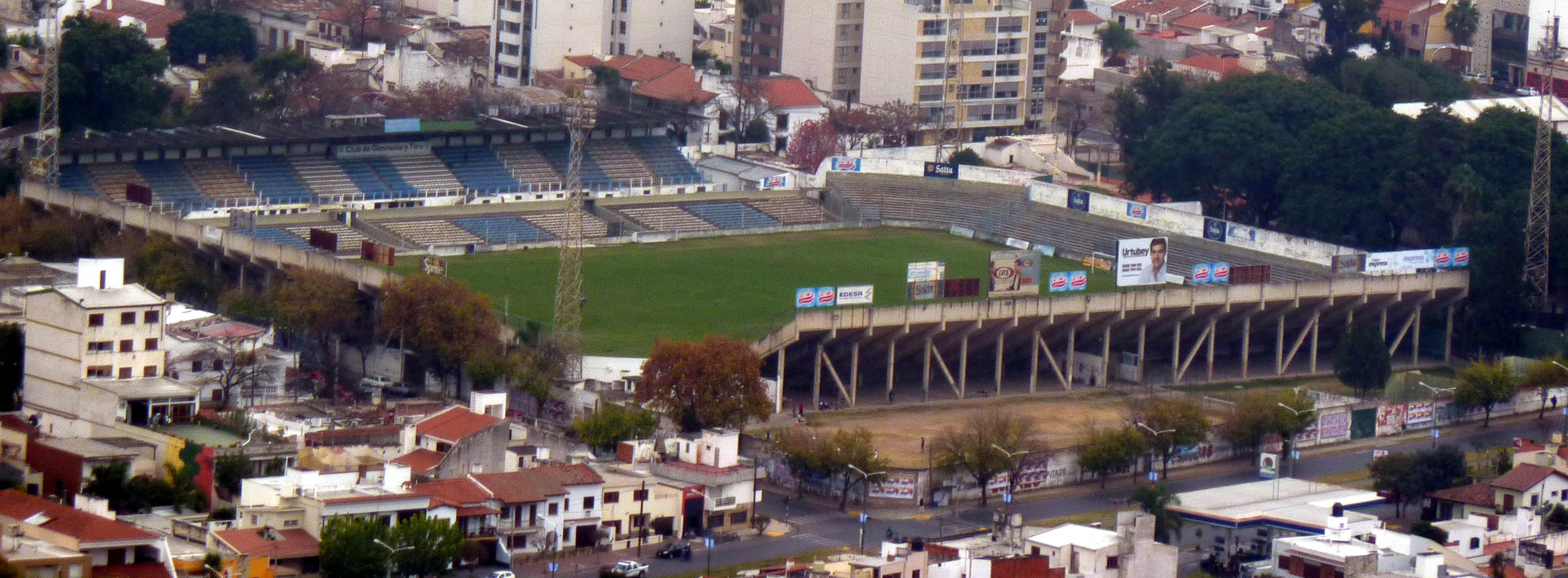
- Interactive map of El Gigante del Norte Stadium
- Address: Vicente López 670; Salta; Argentina
- Owner: Gimnasia y Tiro
- Capacity: 24,300
- Type: Stadium
- Surface: Grass

Construction
- Opened: c.1922; 104 years ago
- Renovated: 1980, 1994

Tenants
- Gimnasia y Tiro football (c. 1922–present); Gimnasia y Tiro rugby (1952–present); Argentina national team (1994)

Estadio El Gigante del Norte is a football stadium located in the city of Salta in the homonymous province of Argentina. It is owned and operated by local club Gimnasia y Tiro and was opened in the 1920s. The stadium has a capacity of 24,300 spectators.

Apart from football, the stadium has hosted several sports events through the years, such as baseball and bicycle racing. El Gigante has also hosted rugby union matches (the GyT rugby team, and some games organised by the Salta Rugby Union.

The Argentina national team (with superstar Diego Maradona) played a friendly vs Morocco (won 3–1) at El Gigante in 1994, as part of their preparation for the 1994 FIFA World Cup.

== History ==
Club Gimnasia y Tiro was founded in 1902. At first, football was one of the multiple activities practised there, but its continuous growth caused the club decided to build a stadium, about 20 years after Gimnasia y Tiro's foundation. Ten years later, a grandstand was built. Another stand on Leguizamón street would be built a few years later.

Apart from football, the stadium was used to host other sporting events such as bicycle or karting races. In the 1980s the club built two popular stands, and a small stall.

Vélez Sársfield's stadium had been the first venue in South America with a lighting system, inaugurated in 1928. When the club moved to José Amalfitani Stadium in 1943, one of the members of Vélez Sarsfield executive committee, Raùl D'Onofrio (father of then president of River Plate Rodolfo D'Onofrio), came up with the idea of bring the lighting system used in baseball stadiums in the US that had impressed him. Nevertheless, the club later would sign an agreement with Germany-based company Siemens to be is supplier. José Amalfitani Stadium inaugurated its lighting system in 1969 in a match vs Brazilian Santos FC

In 1979, Gimnasia y Tiro acquired the lights and towers of the old Vèlez Sarsfield venue. The installation took more than a year and in 1980 El Gigante del Norte inaugurated its lighting system. That technological advance allowed the club to host several events at nights, not only football matches but music concerts (from Argentine folclore to rock), and even doma festivals at El Gigante.

In 1994, the stadium was refurbished, replacing the old wooden stands by concrete-made ones. Estadio El Gigante was reinaugurated on 20 April 1994 with a friendly match between Argentina and Marruecos national teams, the last played by Argentina before travelling to the United States, organiser of the 1994 FIFA World Cup. In that match, Diego Maradona scored a goal by penalty which would be his last goal for the national team in his home country. The match had a record attendance of 35,000 spectators.
