= Huracán Corrientes =

- Full name: Club Atlético Huracán Corrientes
- Nickname(s): Globo; Azulgrana
- Founded: 28 May 1918
- Ground: Estadio José Antonio Romero Feris
- Capacity: 15.700
- League: Torneo Regional Federal Amateur
- 2010–11: 4.
- Website: http://www.cahuracancorrientes.com.ar/cahcjoomla/
Home colours	Away colours

Club Atlético Huracán Corrientes, known as Huracán Corrientes is a football club from Corrientes, Corrientes Province, Argentina. The team currently plays in the Torneo Regional Federal Amateur, the fourth division of the Argentine football league system. Huracán has only played one season in the Argentine top flight. Its first appearance was in the 1996 Apertura.

== Honours ==
=== National ===
- Primera B Nacional
  - Winners (1): 1995–96

=== Regional ===
- Liga Correntina
  - Winners (20): 1923, 1928, 1932, 1933, 1938, 1941, 1946, 1947, 1964, 1966, 1967, 1968, 1970, 1971, 1974, 2001, 2003, 2004, 2015, 2022
