= Gimnasia y Tiro =

Association football club in Argentina

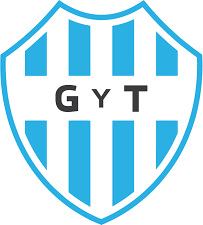
- Full name: Club de Gimnasia y Tiro
- Nicknames: Albo; Millonario
- Founded: 29 November 1902; 123 years ago
- Ground: Gigante Del Norte, Salta, Argentina
- Capacity: 25,000
- Manager: Juan Manuel Azconzábal
- League: Primera Nacional
- 2025: Primera Nacional Zone A, 4th of 18
- Website: http://www.elgigantedesalta.com.ar/
Home colours	Away colours

Club de Gimnasia y Tiro is an Argentine football club, based in the city of Salta. The team currently plays in Primera Nacional, the second division of the Argentine football league system.

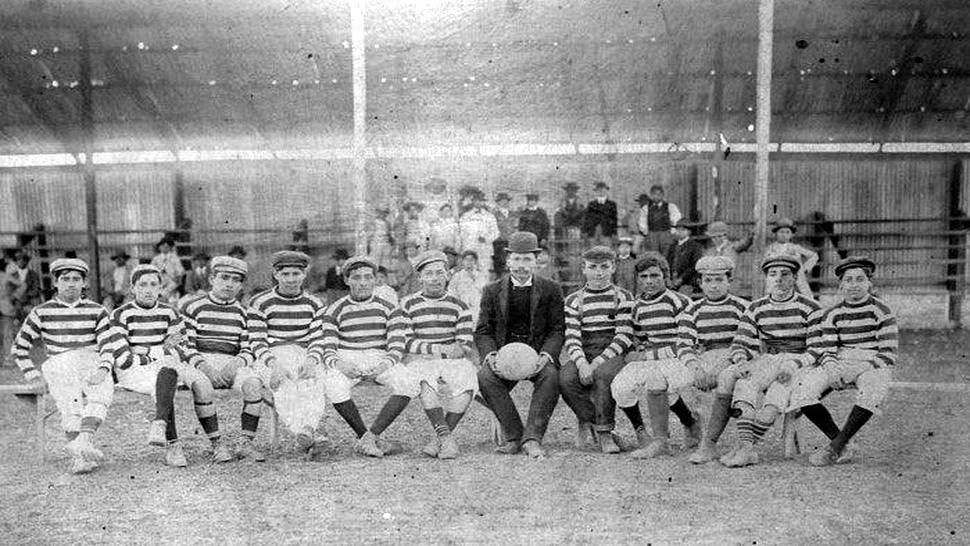
Early football team, c. 1902

Gimnasia y Tiro has played four seasons at the highest level of Argentine football. First came in 1979 and 1981 Nacional championships. Gimnasia finished bottom of their group in 1979 and 6th of 7 teams in 1981. The third season was in 1993–94. The fourth season was in 1997–98 when the squad promoted to the Argentine Primera División but after finishing 20th (last) in the Apertura and 17th in the Clausura tournaments respectively, Gimnasia was relegated at the end of the season.

== Current squad ==
As of 2014–15 season

Note: Flags indicate national team as defined under FIFA eligibility rules; some limited exceptions apply. Players may hold more than one non-FIFA nationality.

No.	Pos.	Nation	Player
—	GK	ARG	Martín Perelman
—	GK	ARG	Ariel Paniego
—	GK	ARG	Marcos Mamani
—	DF	ARG	Luciano Estrada
—	DF	ARG	Facundo Vega
—	DF	ARG	Gaston Suso
—	DF	ARG	Facundo Castro
—	DF	ARG	Nicolas Aguirre
—	DF	ARG	Ignacio Ameli
—	DF	ARG	Leonardo Federico Rodríguez
—	MF	ARG	Rubén Villarreal
—	MF	ARG	Pablo Saucedo
—	MF	ARG	Gastón Valente

No.	Pos.	Nation	Player
—	MF	ARG	Daniel Ramasco
—	MF	ARG	Leandro Navarro
—	MF	ARG	Vicente Monje
—	MF	ARG	Tomás Basualdo
—	MF	ARG	Juan Chanquia
—	MF	ARG	Franco Flores
—	MF	ARG	Miguel Guglielmi
—	MF	ARG	Nicolás Gianni
—	FW	ARG	Francisco Vazzoler
—	FW	ARG	Diego Bielkiewicz
—	FW	ARG	Emiliano Piecenti
—	FW	ARG	Marcos Navarro
—	FW	ARG	Leandro Zárate
