= 1992–93 Primera B Nacional =

7th season of the second-tier football league in Argentina

Primera B Nacional
- Season: 1992–93
- Champions: Banfield (1st divisional title)
- Promoted: Banfield; Gimnasia y Tiro
- Relegated: Racing (C); Defensa y Justicia; Villa Dálmine
- Top goalscorer: Miguel Amaya 21 goals

The 1992–93 Argentine Primera B Nacional was the seventh season of second division professional of football in Argentina. A total of 22 teams competed; the champion and runner-up were promoted to Primera División.

Banfield (champion of the competition) and Gimnasia y Tiro (winner of "Torneo Octogonal" after beating Central Córdoba de Rosario in a two-legged series) promoted to the higher division.

== Club information ==
Club	City	Stadium
Almirante Brown	Isidro Casanova	Fragata Presidente Sarmiento
Arsenal	Sarandí	Julio H. Grondona
Atlético de Rafaela	Rafaela	Nuevo Monumental
Atlético Tucumán	San Miguel de Tucumán	Monumental Presidente Jose Fierro
Banfield	Banfield	Florencio Solá
Central Córdoba	Rosario	Gabino Sosa
Chaco For Ever	Resistencia	Juan Alberto García
Colón	Santa Fe	Brigadier General Estanislao López
Defensa y Justicia	Florencio Varela	Norberto "Tito" Tomaghello
Deportivo Laferrere	Gregorio de Laferrere	José Luis Sánchez
Deportivo Morón	Morón	Francisco Urbano
Douglas Haig	Pergamino	Miguel Morales
Gimnasia y Tiro	Salta	Gigante del Norte
Instituto	Córdoba	Presidente Perón
Ituzaingó	Ituzaingó	Ituzaingó
Nueva Chicago	Mataderos	Nueva Chicago
Quilmes	Quilmes	Centenario
Racing	Córdoba	Miguel Sancho
Sportivo Italiano	Ciudad Evita	Republica de Italia
Talleres	Remedios de Escalada	Talleres de Remedios de Escalada
Unión	Santa Fe	15 de Abril
Villa Dálmine	Campana	El Coliseo

== Standings ==
Banfield after a tiebreaker playoff was declared champion and was automatically promoted to Primera División, and the teams placed 2nd to 8th qualified for the Second Promotion Playoff.

Pos	Team	Pld	W	D	L	GF	GA	GD	Pts	Promotion or qualification
1	Banfield	42	23	10	9	77	40	+37	56	Championship playoff
2	Colón	42	20	16	6	59	42	+17	56	Championship playoff
3	Gimnasia y Tiro	42	20	11	11	63	39	+24	51	Qualified for the Second Promotion Playoff
4	Sportivo Italiano	42	17	14	11	65	49	+16	48	Qualified for the Second Promotion Playoff
5	Central Córdoba (R)	42	17	12	13	54	50	+4	46	Qualified for the Second Promotion Playoff
6	Arsenal	42	12	21	9	38	31	+7	45	Qualified for the Second Promotion Playoff
7	Quilmes	42	11	23	8	43	37	+6	45	Qualified for the Second Promotion Playoff
8	Almirante Brown	42	16	13	13	42	47	−5	45	Qualified for the Second Promotion Playoff
9	Nueva Chicago	42	17	10	15	46	48	−2	44	
10	Unión	42	13	17	12	61	49	+12	43	
11	Atlético de Rafaela	42	12	19	11	44	39	+5	43	
12	Atlético Tucumán	42	13	16	13	47	43	+4	42	
13	Chaco For Ever	42	13	15	14	46	43	+3	41	
14	Talleres (RE)	42	11	19	12	40	47	−7	41	
15	Instituto	42	10	21	11	46	55	−9	41	
16	Deportivo Laferrere	42	11	18	13	35	41	−6	40	
17	Ituzaingó	42	10	18	14	35	51	−16	38	
18	Deportivo Morón	42	8	19	15	39	47	−8	35	
19	Douglas Haig	42	9	16	17	39	51	−12	34	
20	Defensa y Justicia	42	10	13	19	46	54	−8	33	
21	Villa Dálmine	42	6	17	19	22	57	−35	29	
22	Racing (C)	42	5	18	19	37	64	−27	28	

=== Tiebreaker Playoff ===
As Banfield and Colón finished the season tied in 56 points, it was necessary to play a tiebreaker to define which team would be crowned as champion and which team had to play the Second Promotion Playoff. The match was played on June 26 at Chateau Carreras Stadium in Córdoba, with 30,000 supporters of Colón attending the match.

Banfield goalkeeper Javier Puentedura became keyplayer of its team after stopping two penalty shots. Javier Sanguinetti scored the last penalty shot for Banfield while Roberto Mamani missed for Colón, allowing the Taladro to win the series and promote to the highest division of Argentine football.

Team 1	Sco.	Team 2	Venue	City
Banfield	0–0 (5–4 p)	Colón	Chateau Carreras	Córdoba

==== Match details ====
1992–93 Primera B Nacional Final
Saturday, 26 June 1993

Banfield	0–0	Colón
	Report
Penalties
Maciel (penalty scored); Jiménez (penalty scored); Godoy (penalty scored); Delfino (penalty scored); Maciel (penalty scored); Benedetti (penalty missed); Lenguita (penalty missed); Herrero (penalty missed)	5–4	(penalty scored) Marini; (penalty scored) Juárez; (penalty scored) Ferrer; (penalty scored) Guzmán; (penalty missed) Enrique; (penalty missed) Vázquez; (penalty missed) González; (penalty missed) Mamani

Chateau Carreras, Córdoba
Referee: Juan Carlos Crespi

Team details

Banfield
Colón

GK	1	(Argentina) Javier Puentedura
DF	4	(Argentina) Ivar Stafuza
DF	2	(Argentina) Javier Sanguinetti
DF	6	(Argentina) Damián Benedetti
DF	3	(Argentina) Gustavo J. Maciel
MF	8	(Argentina) Jorge A. Ortega	(substituted off) a'
MF	5	(Argentina) Fabio Lenguita
MF	10	(Argentina) Jorge R. Jiménez
MF		(Argentina) Juan C. Roldán
FW		(Argentina) Daniel Delfino
FW	11	(Argentina) Diego G. Díaz	(substituted off) b'
Substitutes:
FW		(Argentina) Héctor M. Herrero	(substituted on) a'
DF		(Argentina) Héctor G. Godoy	(substituted on) b'
Manager:
(Argentina) Carlos Babington

GK	(Argentina) José F. Perassi
DF	(Paraguay) Jorge González
DF	(Paraguay) Vicente Fariña
DF	(Argentina) Alfredo Júarez
DF	(Paraguay) Arnaldo Vázquez
MF	(Paraguay) Juan A. Lugo	(substituted off) a'
MF	(Argentina) Juan A. Ferrer
MF	(Paraguay) Adolfino Cañete	(substituted off) b'
MF	(Argentina) Luis Guzmán
FW	(Argentina) Roberto Mamani
FW	(Argentina) Adrián Marini
Substitutes:
FW	(Argentina) Mario Sciacqua	(substituted on) a'
DF	(Argentina) Marcelo D. Enrique	(substituted on) b'
Manager:
(Argentina) Jorge Ginarte

== Second Promotion Playoff ==
The Second Promotion Playoff or Torneo Reducido was played by the teams placed 2nd to 8th in the overall standings: Colón (2nd), Gimnasia y Tiro (3rd), Sportivo Italiano (4th), Central Córdoba (R) (5th), Arsenal (6th), Quilmes (7th) and Almirante Brown (8th), and the champion of Primera B Metropolitana: All Boys. The winning team was promoted to Primera División.

=== Bracket ===
Quarterfinals
3	Gimnasia y Tiro	1	4	5
8	Almirante Brown	1	0	1
4	Sportivo Italiano	0	1	1
7	Quilmes	0	0	0
2	Colón	1	1	2
PBM	All Boys	0	1	1
5	Central Córdoba (R)	1	2	3
6	Arsenal	1	0	1

Semifinals
3	Gimnasia y Tiro	2	1	3
4	Sportivo Italiano	2	0	2
2	Colón	2	0	2
5	Central Córdoba (R)	1	3	4

Final
3	Gimnasia y Tiro	2	3	5
5	Central Córdoba (R)	0	2	2

- Note: The team in the first line plays at home the second leg.

=== Finals ===
Torneo Reducido final
(2nd. promotion playoff)
31 July 1993
First leg

Central Córdoba (R)	0–2	Gimnasia y Tiro

Estadio Gigante de Arroyito, Rosario

7 August 1993
Second leg

Gimnasia y Tiro	3–2	Central Córdoba (R)
Castellanos; Amaya; F. González		Migliazzo; Almirón

El Gigante del Norte, Salta
Referee: Javier Castrilli

Team details

Gimnasia y Tiro
Central Córdoba (R)

Note: Gimnasia y Tiro won 5–2 on aggregate, promoting to Primera División.

== Relegation ==
Pos	Team	1990–91 Pts	1991–92 Pts	1992–93 Pts	Total Pts	Total Pld	Avg	Situation	Affiliation
1	Gimnasia y Tiro	—	—	51	51	42	1.214		Indirect
2	Quilmes	54	—	45	99	84	1.179		Direct
3	Colón	36	52	56	144	126	1.143		Direct
4	Almirante Brown	46	52	45	143	126	1.135		Direct
5	Banfield	47	40	56	143	126	1.135		Direct
6	Atlético Tucumán	52	46	42	140	126	1.111		Indirect
7	Nueva Chicago	—	49	44	93	84	1.107		Direct
8	Arsenal	—	—	45	45	42	1.071		Direct
9	Instituto	44	47	41	132	126	1.048		Indirect
10	Central Córdoba (R)	—	42	46	88	84	1.048		Direct
11	Chaco For Ever	—	46	41	87	84	1.036		Indirect
12	Unión	—	—	43	43	42	1.024		Direct
13	Douglas Haig	44	50	34	128	126	1.016		Indirect
14	Talleres (RE)	41	44	31	126	126	1		Direct
15	Atlético de Rafaela	42	35	43	120	126	0.952		Indirect
16	Sportivo Italiano	34	38	48	120	126	0.952		Direct
17	Deportivo Morón	43	41	35	119	126	0.944		Direct
18	Deportivo Laferrere	39	39	40	118	126	0.937		Direct
19	Ituzaingó	—	—	38	38	42	0.905		Direct
20	Racing (C)	40	43	28	111	126	0.881	Liga Cordobesa de fútbol	Indirect
21	Defensa y Justicia	38	38	33	109	126	0.865	Primera B Metropolitana	Direct
22	Villa Dálmine	39	29	29	97	126	0.77	Primera B Metropolitana	Direct

Note: Clubs with indirect affiliation with AFA are relegated to their respective league of his province according to the Argentine football league system, while clubs directly affiliated face relegation to Primera B Metropolitana. Clubs with direct affiliation are all from Greater Buenos Aires, with the exception of Newell's, Rosario Central, Central Córdoba and Argentino de Rosario, all from Rosario, and Unión and Colón from Santa Fe.

== See also ==
- 1992–93 in Argentine football
