= 1989–90 Primera B Nacional =

4th season of the second-tier football league in Argentina

Primera B Nacional
- Season: 1989–90
- Champions: Huracán (1st title)
- Promoted: Huracán; Lanús
- Relegated: Los Andes; Olimpo; Deportivo Armenio
- Top goalscorer: Abel Blasón; Juan Almada 20 goals

The 1989–90 Argentine Primera B Nacional was the fourth season of second division professional of football in Argentina. A total of 22 teams competed; the champion and runner-up were promoted to Argentine Primera División.

== Club information ==
| Club | City | Stadium |
|---|---|---|
| Almirante Brown | Isidro Casanova | Fragata Presidente Sarmiento |
| Atlético de Rafaela | Rafaela | Nuevo Monumental |
| Atlético Tucumán | San Miguel de Tucumán | Monumental Presidente Jose Fierro |
| Banfield | Banfield | Florencio Solá |
| Belgrano | Córdoba | El Gigante de Alberdi |
| Central Córdoba | Santiago del Estero | Alfredo Terrara |
| Cipolletti | Cipolletti | La Visera de Cemento |
| Colón | Santa Fe | Brigadier General Estanislao López |
| Defensa y Justicia | Florencio Varela | Norberto "Tito" Tomaghello |
| Deportivo Armenio | Ingeniero Maschwitz | República de Armenia |
| Deportivo Maipú | Maipú | Higinio Sperdutti |
| Douglas Haig | Pergamino | Miguel Morales |
| Huracán | Parque Patricios | Tomás Adolfo Ducó |
| Lanús | Lanús | Ciudad de Lanús |
| Los Andes | Lomas de Zamora | Eduardo Gallardón |
| Olimpo | Bahía Blanca | Roberto Natalio Carminatti |
| Quilmes | Quilmes | Centenario |
| San Martín | San Miguel de Tucumán | La Ciudadela |
| Sportivo Italiano | Ciudad Evita | Republica de Italia |
| Talleres | Remedios de Escalada | Talleres de Remedios de Escalada |
| Tigre | Victoria | José Dellagiovanna |
| Villa Dálmine | Campana | El Coliseo |

== Standings ==
Huracán was declared champion and was automatically promoted to Primera División, and the teams placed 2nd to 10th qualified for the Second Promotion Playoff.

| Pos | Team | Pld | W | D | L | GF | GA | GD | Pts | Promotion or qualification |
|---|---|---|---|---|---|---|---|---|---|---|
| 1 | Huracán | 42 | 24 | 12 | 6 | 70 | 32 | +38 | 60 | Champion, promoted to Primera División |
| 2 | Quilmes | 42 | 19 | 15 | 8 | 65 | 43 | +22 | 53 | Qualified for the Second Promotion Playoff Semifinals |
| 3 | Douglas Haig | 42 | 19 | 13 | 10 | 46 | 39 | +7 | 51 | Qualified for the Second Promotion Playoff Second Round |
| 4 | San Martín (T) | 42 | 17 | 14 | 11 | 49 | 37 | +12 | 48 | Qualified for the Second Promotion Playoff First Round |
| 5 | Lanús | 42 | 16 | 15 | 11 | 59 | 50 | +9 | 47 | Qualified for the Second Promotion Playoff First Round |
| 6 | Atlético de Rafaela | 42 | 15 | 17 | 10 | 55 | 46 | +9 | 47 | Qualified for the Second Promotion Playoff First Round |
| 7 | Belgrano | 42 | 16 | 15 | 11 | 39 | 36 | +3 | 47 | Qualified for the Second Promotion Playoff First Round |
| 8 | Banfield | 42 | 14 | 18 | 10 | 53 | 43 | +10 | 46 | Qualified for the Second Promotion Playoff First Round |
| 9 | Sportivo Italiano | 42 | 14 | 18 | 10 | 32 | 29 | +3 | 46 | Qualified for the Second Promotion Playoff First Round |
| 10 | Colón | 42 | 13 | 19 | 10 | 46 | 35 | +11 | 45 | Qualified for the Second Promotion Playoff First Round |
| 11 | Villa Dálmine | 42 | 15 | 14 | 13 | 41 | 41 | 0 | 44 | |
| 12 | Atlético Tucumán | 42 | 15 | 13 | 14 | 53 | 54 | −1 | 43 | |
| 13 | Tigre | 42 | 14 | 13 | 15 | 48 | 53 | −5 | 41 | |
| 14 | Almirante Brown | 42 | 11 | 17 | 14 | 42 | 54 | −12 | 39 | |
| 15 | Los Andes | 42 | 10 | 18 | 14 | 42 | 52 | −10 | 38 | |
| 16 | Central Córdoba (SdE) | 42 | 13 | 13 | 16 | 42 | 47 | −5 | 37 (Note: 2 points deducted for violence acts) | |
| 17 | Deportivo Maipú | 42 | 10 | 15 | 17 | 43 | 46 | −3 | 35 | |
| 18 | Talleres (RE) | 42 | 11 | 13 | 18 | 42 | 51 | −9 | 35 | |
| 19 | Defensa y Justicia | 42 | 7 | 21 | 14 | 46 | 57 | −11 | 35 | |
| 20 | Cipolletti | 42 | 10 | 13 | 19 | 42 | 56 | −14 | 33 | |
| 21 | Olimpo | 42 | 10 | 10 | 22 | 54 | 71 | −17 | 30 | |
| 22 | Deportivo Armenio | 42 | 5 | 12 | 25 | 27 | 64 | −37 | 22 | |

== Second Promotion Playoff ==
The Second Promotion Playoff or Torneo Reducido was played by the teams placed 2nd to 10th in the overall standings: Quilmes (2nd) who entered in the Semifinals, Douglas Haig (3rd) who entered in the Second Round, San Martín (T) (4th), Lanús (5th), Atlético de Rafaela (6th), Belgrano (7th), Banfield (8th), Sportivo Italiano (9th) and Colón (10th); the champion of Primera B Metropolitana: Deportivo Morón and Deportivo Laferrere and Atlanta, both winners of Zonales Noroeste y Sureste from Torneo del Interior. The winner was promoted to Primera División.

First Round
First Leg
| Home | Result | Away |
|---|---|---|
| Deportivo Laferrere | 1–2 | Lanús |
| Deportivo Morón | 0–1 | Atlético de Rafaela |
| Colón | 2–1 | Belgrano |
| Sportivo Italiano | 3–0 | Banfield |
| Atlanta | 2–3 | San Martín (T) |
Second Leg
| Lanús | 1–1 | Deportivo Laferrere |
| Atlético de Rafaela^{1} | 1–2 | Deportivo Morón |
| Belgrano | 2–0 | Colón |
| Banfield | 2–1 | Sportivo Italiano |
| San Martín (T) | 4–0 | Atlanta |

Second Round
First Leg
| Home | Result | Away |
|---|---|---|
| Sportivo Italiano | 2–2 | Douglas Haig |
| Belgrano | 1–0 | San Martín (T) |
| Atlético de Rafaela | 0–3 | Lanús |
Second Leg
| Douglas Haig | 0–3 | Sportivo Italiano |
| San Martín (T) | 0–0 | Belgrano |
| Lanús | 5–2 | Atlético de Rafaela |

Semifinals
First Leg
| Home | Result | Away |
|---|---|---|
| Belgrano | 1–0 | Lanús |
| Sportivo Italiano | 1–1 | Quilmes |
Second Leg
| Lanús^{1} | 3–2 | Belgrano |
| Quilmes | 2–0 | Sportivo Italiano |

=== Final ===
Torneo Reducido Final
(2nd. promotion playoff)
21 July 1990
First leg

| Lanús | 2–1 | Quilmes |
|---|---|---|
| Mainardi | | Almandoz |

Estadio Ciudad de Lanús, Lanús
Referee: Ricardo Calabria

28 July 1990
Second leg

| Quilmes | 1–0 (a.e.t.) | Lanús |
|---|---|---|
| Gáspari 21' |
Penalties
| | 1–4 |

Estadio Guido y Sarmiento, Quilmes
Referee: Abel Gnecco

=== Match details ===
Team details

Quilmes
Lanús

| GK | Alejandro Mulet |
| DF | Hugo A. Ayala |
| DF | Carlos Karabín |
| DF | Héctor Almandoz | Booked | (substituted off) 102' |
| DF | Emilio Kalujerovich |
| MF | Jorge Gáspari |
| MF | Alberto Rodríguez |
| MF | Mario Gómez | | (substituted off) 16' |
| FW | Abel Blasón |
| FW | Luis Sosa |
| FW | Marcelo Rufini |
Substitutions:
| MF | Martín Di Diego | | (substituted in) 16' |
| DF | Guillermo Escalante | | (substituted in) 102' |
Manager:
(Argentina) Hugo M. García

| GK | Luis A. Herrera |
| DF | Fabián Cordero | Booked | (substituted off) 113' |
| DF | Horacio Bidevich |
| DF | Hernán Meske |
| DF | Armando González |
| MF | Néstor González | Booked |
| MF | Rolando Bertolini |
| MF | Gabriel Schurrer | Booked |
| FW | César Angelello | | (substituted off) 97' |
| FW | Guillermo Alonso |
| FW | Gilmar Villagrán |
Substitutions:
| MF | Oscar Monje | | (substituted in) 97' |
| | Marcelo López | | (substituted in) 113' |
Manager:
(Argentina) Miguel Ángel Russo

Note: As the series ended 2–2 on aggregate (extra time included), Lanús won 4–1 on penalties, promoting to Primera División

== Relegation ==
| Pos | Team | 1987–88 Pts | 1988–89 Pts | 1989–90 Pts | Total Pts | Total Pld | Avg | Situation | Affiliation |
|---|---|---|---|---|---|---|---|---|---|
| 1 | Huracán | 48 | 51 | 60 | 159 | 126 | 1.262 | | Direct |
| 2 | Belgrano | 49 | 50 | 47 | 146 | 126 | 1.159 | | Indirect |
| 3 | San Martín (T) | — | — | 48 | 48 | 42 | 1.143 | | Indirect |
| 4 | Quilmes | 54 | 37 | 53 | 144 | 126 | 1.143 | | Direct |
| 5 | Colón | 48 | 50 | 45 | 143 | 126 | 1.135 | | Direct |
| 6 | Atlético de Rafaela | — | — | 47 | 47 | 42 | 1.119 | | Indirect |
| 7 | Lanús | 35 | 53 | 47 | 135 | 126 | 1.071 | | Direct |
| 8 | Banfield | — | 44 | 46 | 90 | 84 | 1.071 | | Direct |
| 9 | Sportivo Italiano | 41 | 46 | 46 | 133 | 126 | 1.056 | | Direct |
| 10 | Atlético Tucumán | 45 | 45 | 43 | 133 | 126 | 1.056 | Relegation Playoff Matches | Indirect |
| 11 | Villa Dálmine | — | — | 44 | 44 | 42 | 1.048 | | Direct |
| 12 | Almirante Brown | 40 | 51 | 39 | 130 | 126 | 1.032 | | Direct |
| 13 | Douglas Haig | 43 | 32 | 51 | 126 | 126 | 1 | | Indirect |
| 14 | Talleres (RE) | — | 48 | 35 | 83 | 84 | 0.988 | | Direct |
| 15 | Defensa y Justicia | 38 | 49 | 35 | 122 | 126 | 0.968 | | Direct |
| 16 | Central Córdoba (SdE) | 42 | 43 | 37 | 122 | 126 | 0.968 | Relegation Playoff Matches | Indirect |
| 17 | Tigre | 49 | 30 | 41 | 120 | 126 | 0.952 | | Direct |
| 18 | Deportivo Maipú | 40 | 43 | 35 | 118 | 126 | 0.937 | | Indirect |
| 19 | Cipolletti | 52 | 28 | 33 | 113 | 126 | 0.897 | Relegation Playoff Matches | Indirect |
| 20 | Los Andes | 33 | 33 | 38 | 104 | 126 | 0.825 | Primera B Metropolitana | Direct |
| 21 | Olimpo | — | — | 30 | 30 | 42 | 0.714 | Liga del Sur | Indirect |
| 22 | Deportivo Armenio | — | — | 22 | 22 | 42 | 0.524 | Primera B Metropolitana | Direct |

Note: Clubs with indirect affiliation with AFA are relegated to their respective league of his province according to the Argentine football league system, while clubs directly affiliated face relegation to Primera B Metropolitana. Clubs with direct affiliation are all from Greater Buenos Aires, with the exception of Newell's, Rosario Central, Central Córdoba and Argentino de Rosario, all from Rosario, and Unión and Colón from Santa Fe.

=== Relegation Playoff Matches ===
Each tie was played on a home-and-away two-legged basis, but if the first match was won by the team of Primera B Nacional (who also played the first leg at home), there was no need to play the second. If instead, the team from the Regional leagues wins the first leg, the second leg must be played, leg that, if its won by the team of Primera B Nacional, a third leg must be played, if the third leg finishes in a tie, the team from Primera B Nacional remains on it. This season, Cipolletti had to play against Fernández Oro from the Liga Deportiva Confluencia (Río Negro Province), Central Córdoba (SdE) had to play against Güemes (SdE) from the Liga Santiagueña de Fútbol, and Atlético Tucumán had to play against Atlético Concepción from the Liga Tucumana de Fútbol.

Relegation Playoff 1
| Home | Result | Away |
|---|---|---|
| Cipolletti | 8 - 0 | Fernández Oro |

- Cipolletti remains in Primera B Nacional.

Relegation Playoff 2
First Leg
| Home | Result | Away |
|---|---|---|
| Central Córdoba (SdE) | 0 - 0 | Güemes (SdE) |
Second Leg
| Central Córdoba (SdE) | 3 - 1 | Güemes (SdE) |

- Central Córdoba (SdE) remains in Primera B Nacional.

Relegation Playoff 3
First Leg
| Home | Result | Away |
|---|---|---|
| Atlético Tucumán | 0 - 0 | Atlético Concepción |
Second Leg
| Atlético Tucumán | 0 - 0 | Atlético Concepción |
Third Leg
| Atlético Tucumán | 1 - 0 | Atlético Concepción |

- Atlético Tucumán remains in Primera B Nacional.

== See also ==
- 1989–90 in Argentine football
