= 1988–89 Primera B Nacional =

3rd season of the second-tier football league in Argentina

Primera B Nacional
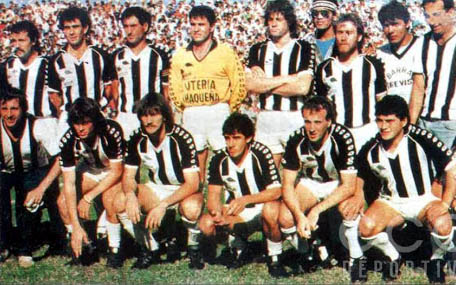
- Chaco for Ever, champion
- Season: 1988–89
- Champions: Chaco For Ever (1st. title)
- Promoted: Chaco For Ever; Unión (SF)
- Relegated: Chacarita Juniors; Temperley; Estación Quequén
- Top goalscorer: Daniel Aquino; Sergio Recchiutti (24 goals each)

The 1988–89 Argentine Primera B Nacional was the 3rd. season of second division professional of football in Argentina. A total of 22 teams competed; the champion and runner-up were promoted to Argentine Primera División. Chaco For Ever (champion) and Unión (SF) (winner of "Torneo Dodecagonal" after beating arch-rival Colón in a two-legged series) promoted to Primera División.

On the other hand, Chacarita Juniors, Temperley, and Estación Quequén (Necochea) were relegated to Primera B.

== Club information ==
| Club | City | Stadium |
|---|---|---|
| Almirante Brown | Isidro Casanova | Fragata Presidente Sarmiento |
| Atlético Tucumán | San Miguel de Tucumán | Monumental Presidente Jose Fierro |
| Banfield | Banfield | Florencio Solá |
| Belgrano | Córdoba | El Gigante de Alberdi |
| Central Córdoba | Santiago del Estero | Alfredo Terrara |
| Chacarita Juniors | Villa Maipú | Chacarita Juniors |
| Chaco For Ever | Resistencia | Juan Alberto García |
| Cipolletti | Cipolletti | La Visera de Cemento |
| Colón | Santa Fe | Brigadier General Estanislao López |
| Defensa y Justicia | Florencio Varela | Norberto "Tito" Tomaghello |
| Deportivo Maipú | Maipú | Higinio Sperdutti |
| Douglas Haig | Pergamino | Miguel Morales |
| Estación Quequén | Quequén | Carlos Cuomo |
| Huracán | Parque Patricios | Tomás Adolfo Ducó |
| Lanús | Lanús | Ciudad de Lanús |
| Los Andes | Lomas de Zamora | Eduardo Gallardón |
| Quilmes | Quilmes | Centenario |
| Sportivo Italiano | Ciudad Evita | Republica de Italia |
| Talleres | Remedios de Escalada | Talleres de Remedios de Escalada |
| Temperley | Temperley | Alfredo Beranger |
| Tigre | Victoria | José Dellagiovanna |
| Unión | Santa Fe | 15 de Abril |

== Standings ==
Chaco For Ever was declared champion and was automatically promoted to Primera División, and the teams placed 2nd to 10th qualified for the Second Promotion Playoff.

| Pos | Team | Pld | W | D | L | GF | GA | GD | Pts | Promotion or qualification |
|---|---|---|---|---|---|---|---|---|---|---|
| 1 | Chaco For Ever | 42 | 21 | 12 | 9 | 66 | 44 | +22 | 54 | Champion, promoted to Primera División |
| 2 | Lanús | 42 | 18 | 17 | 7 | 69 | 42 | +27 | 53 | Qualified for the Second Promotion Playoff Semifinals |
| 3 | Unión | 42 | 16 | 20 | 6 | 55 | 33 | +22 | 52 | Qualified for the Second Promotion Playoff Second Round |
| 4 | Almirante Brown | 42 | 19 | 13 | 10 | 66 | 43 | +23 | 51 | Qualified for the Second Promotion Playoff First Round |
| 5 | Huracán | 42 | 19 | 13 | 10 | 59 | 42 | +17 | 51 (Note: The match between Central Córdoba (SdE) and Huracán of round 3 was suspended in 83', later was awarded to Huracán 1-0.) | Qualified for the Second Promotion Playoff First Round |
| 6 | Colón | 42 | 16 | 18 | 8 | 57 | 37 | +20 | 50 | Qualified for the Second Promotion Playoff First Round |
| 7 | Belgrano | 42 | 19 | 12 | 11 | 59 | 43 | +16 | 50 | Qualified for the Second Promotion Playoff First Round |
| 8 | Defensa y Justicia | 42 | 18 | 13 | 11 | 47 | 42 | +5 | 49 | Qualified for the Second Promotion Playoff First Round |
| 9 | Talleres (RE) | 42 | 19 | 10 | 13 | 65 | 56 | +9 | 48 | Qualified for the Second Promotion Playoff First Round |
| 10 | Sportivo Italiano | 42 | 16 | 14 | 12 | 52 | 51 | +1 | 46 | Qualified for the Second Promotion Playoff First Round |
| 11 | Atlético Tucumán | 42 | 16 | 13 | 13 | 58 | 50 | +8 | 45 | |
| 12 | Banfield | 42 | 14 | 16 | 12 | 71 | 70 | +1 | 44 | |
| 13 | Central Córdoba (SdE) | 42 | 15 | 13 | 14 | 39 | 39 | 0 | 43 | |
| 14 | Deportivo Maipú | 42 | 17 | 9 | 16 | 45 | 56 | −11 | 43 | |
| 15 | Quilmes | 42 | 12 | 13 | 17 | 42 | 58 | −16 | 37 | |
| 16 | Los Andes | 42 | 11 | 11 | 20 | 42 | 59 | −17 | 33 | |
| 17 | Douglas Haig | 42 | 10 | 14 | 18 | 35 | 52 | −17 | 32 (Note: 2 points deducted for violence acts) | |
| 18 | Estación Quequén | 42 | 9 | 13 | 20 | 47 | 69 | −22 | 31 | |
| 19 | Tigre | 42 | 6 | 18 | 18 | 45 | 59 | −14 | 30 | |
| 20 | Cipolletti | 42 | 6 | 16 | 20 | 39 | 56 | −17 | 28 | |
| 21 | Temperley | 42 | 4 | 18 | 20 | 28 | 59 | −31 | 26 | |
| 22 | Chacarita Juniors | 42 | 8 | 10 | 24 | 36 | 60 | −24 | 23 (Note: 3 points deducted for violence acts) | |

== Second Promotion Playoff ==
The Second Promotion Playoff or Torneo Reducido was played by the teams placed 2nd to 10th in the overall standings: Lanús (2nd) who entered in the Semifinals, Unión (3rd) who entered in the Second Round, Almirante Brown (4th) Huracán (5th) Colón (6th), Belgrano (7th), Defensa y Justicia (8th), Talleres (RE) (9th) and Sportivo Italiano (10th); the champion of Primera B Metropolitana: Villa Dálmine, Atlético de Rafaela and Olimpo, both winners of Zonales Noroeste y Sureste from Torneo del Interior. The winner was promoted to Primera División.

First Round
First Leg
| Home | Result | Away |
|---|---|---|
| Atlético de Rafaela | 3–5 | Huracán |
| Olimpo | 2–0 | Almirante Brown |
| Villa Dálmine | 0–0 | Colón |
| Sportivo Italiano | 0–0 | Belgrano |
| Talleres (RE) | 0–0 | Defensa y Justicia |
Second Leg
| Huracán | 2–1 | Atlético de Rafaela |
| Almirante Brown^{1} | 3–1 | Olimpo |
| Colón | 4–1 | Villa Dálmine |
| Belgrano | 0–1 | Sportivo Italiano |
| Defensa y Justicia | 2–1 | Talleres (RE) |

Second Round
First Leg
| Home | Result | Away |
|---|---|---|
| Colón | 1–0 | Huracán |
| Defensa y Justicia | 0–2 | Almirante Brown |
| Sportivo Italiano | 1–2 | Unión |
Second Leg
| Huracán | 1–2 | Colón |
| Almirante Brown | 1–2 | Defensa y Justicia |
| Unión | 2–2 | Sportivo Italiano |

Semifinals
First Leg
| Home | Result | Away |
|---|---|---|
| Almirante Brown | 0–2 | Unión |
| Lanús | 0–2 | Colón |
Second Leg
| Unión | 3–0 | Almirante Brown |
| Colón | 1–1 | Lanús |

=== Final ===
Torneo Reducido final
(2nd. promotion playoff)
22 July 1989
First leg

| Colón | 0–2 | Unión |
|---|---|---|
| | Report | Echaniz; Altamirano |

Estadio de Colón, Santa Fe
Referee: Francisco Lamolina

29 July 1989
Second leg

| Unión | 1–0 | Colón |
|---|---|---|
| Madelón | Report 1 Report 2 |

Estadio 15 de Abril, Santa Fe
Referee: Abel Gnecco

Team details

Unión
Colón

| GK | Gustavo Tognarelli |
| DF | Ricardo Altamirano |
| DF | Luis Tomé |
| DF | Jorge Mauri |
| DF | Horacio Humoller |
| MF | Carlos González |
| MF | Roberto Passucci |
| MF | Víctor Rabuñal |
| MF | Leonardo Madelón |
| FW | Gustavo Echaniz | (substituted off) 46' |
| FW | Dante Fernández | (substituted off) 88' |
Substitutes:
| MF | Eduardo R. Sánchez | (substituted in) 46' |
| DF | Mario Alberto | (substituted in) 88' |
Manager:
(Argentina) Humberto Zuccarelli

| GK | Miguel A. Wirtz |
| DF | Luis Escobedo |
| DF | Horacio Monti |
| DF | Guillermo Nicosia |
| DF | Sergio Míguez |
| MF | Javier López |
| MF | Gustavo Toledo |
| MF | Raúl Chaparro |
| FW | Pedro Argota | (substituted off) 58' |
| FW | Juan A. Vera |
| FW | Daniel Mozas | (substituted off) 46' |
Substitutes:
| FW | Héctor López | (substituted in) 46' |
| FW | Sergio Verdirame | (substituted in) 58' |
Manager:
(Argentina) Orlando Medina

Note: Unión won 3–0 on aggregate, promoting to Primera División.

== Relegation ==
| Pos | Team | 1986–87 Pts | 1987–88 Pts | 1988–89 Pts | Total Pts | Total Pld | Avg | Situation | Affiliation |
|---|---|---|---|---|---|---|---|---|---|
| 1 | Unión | — | — | 52 | 52 | 42 | 1.238 | | Direct |
| 2 | Belgrano | 54 | 49 | 50 | 153 | 126 | 1.214 | | Indirect |
| 3 | Huracán | 54 | 48 | 51 | 153 | 126 | 1.214 | | Direct |
| 4 | Chaco For Ever | 48 | 51 | 54 | 153 | 126 | 1.214 | | Indirect |
| 5 | Colón | 54 | 48 | 50 | 152 | 126 | 1.206 | | Direct |
| 6 | Banfield | 54 | — | 44 | 98 | 84 | 1.167 | | Direct |
| 7 | Talleres (RE) | — | — | 48 | 48 | 42 | 1.143 | | Direct |
| 8 | Quilmes | 48 | 54 | 37 | 139 | 126 | 1.103 | | Direct |
| 9 | Almirante Brown | 45 | 40 | 51 | 136 | 126 | 1.079 | | Direct |
| 10 | Atlético Tucumán | — | 45 | 45 | 90 | 84 | 1.071 | | Indirect |
| 11 | Lanús | 47 | 35 | 53 | 135 | 126 | 1.071 | | Direct |
| 12 | Deportivo Maipú | 49 | 40 | 43 | 132 | 126 | 1.048 | Relegation Playoff Matches | Indirect |
| 13 | Sportivo Italiano | — | 41 | 46 | 87 | 84 | 1.036 | | Direct |
| 14 | Defensa y Justicia | 43 | 38 | 49 | 130 | 126 | 1.032 | | Direct |
| 15 | Central Córdoba (SdE) | 37 | 42 | 43 | 122 | 126 | 0.968 | | Indirect |
| 16 | Tigre | 38 | 49 | 30 | 117 | 126 | 0.929 | | Direct |
| 17 | Douglas Haig | 41 | 43 | 32 | 116 | 126 | 0.921 | | Indirect |
| 18 | Cipolletti | 35 | 52 | 28 | 115 | 126 | 0.913 | | Indirect |
| 19 | Los Andes | 40 | 33 | 33 | 106 | 126 | 0.841 | | Direct |
| 20 | Chacarita Juniors | 34 | 43 | 23 | 100 | 126 | 0.794 | Primera B Metropolitana | Direct |
| 21 | Temperley | — | 38 | 26 | 64 | 84 | 0.762 | Primera B Metropolitana | Direct |
| 22 | Estación Quequén | — | — | 31 | 31 | 42 | 0.738 | Liga Necochense de fútbol | Indirect |

Note: Clubs with indirect affiliation with AFA are relegated to their respective league of his province according to the Argentine football league system, while clubs directly affiliated face relegation to Primera B Metropolitana. Clubs with direct affiliation are all from Greater Buenos Aires, with the exception of Newell's, Rosario Central, Central Córdoba and Argentino de Rosario, all from Rosario, and Unión and Colón from Santa Fe.

=== Relegation Playoff Matches ===
Each tie was played on a home-and-away two-legged basis, but if the first match was won by the team of Primera B Nacional (who also played the first leg at home), there was no need to play the second. If instead, the team from the Regional leagues wins the first leg, the second leg must be played, leg that, if its won by the team of Primera B Nacional, a third leg must be played, if the third leg finishes in a tie, the team from Primera B Nacional remains on it. This season, Deportivo Maipú had to play against Gutiérrez Sport Club from the Liga Mendocina de fútbol.

Relegation Playoff 1
| Home | Result | Away |
|---|---|---|
| Deportivo Maipú | 1–0 | Gutiérrez Sport Club |

- Deportivo Maipú remains in Primera B Nacional.

== Top scorers ==
| Rank. | Player | Club | Goals |
|---|---|---|---|
| 1 | (Argentina) Daniel Aquino | Banfield | 24 |
| 1 | (Argentina) Sergio Recchiuti | Almirante Brown | 24 |
| 2 | (Argentina) Juan Carlos Almada | Defensa y Justicia | 17 |
| 3 | (Argentina) Hugo Noremberg | Chaco For Ever | 16 |
| 3 | (Argentina) Sergio Verdirame | Colón | 16 |

== See also ==
- 1988–89 in Argentine football
