= 1991–92 Primera B Nacional =

6th season of the second-tier football league in Argentina

Primera B Nacional
- Season: 1991–92
- Champions: Lanús (1st divisional title)
- Promoted: Lanús; San Martín (T)
- Relegated: Deportivo Maipú; San Martín (SJ); Central Córdoba (SdE)
- Top goalscorer: Daniel Cardozo (Alte. Brown); 26 goals

The 1991–92 Argentine Primera B Nacional was the sixth season of second division professional of football in Argentina. A total of 22 teams competed; the champion and runner-up were promoted to Argentine Primera División.

== Club information ==
| Club | City | Stadium |
|---|---|---|
| Almirante Brown | Isidro Casanova | Fragata Presidente Sarmiento |
| Atlético de Rafaela | Rafaela | Nuevo Monumental |
| Atlético Tucumán | San Miguel de Tucumán | Monumental Presidente Jose Fierro |
| Banfield | Banfield | Florencio Solá |
| Central Córdoba | Rosario | Gabino Sosa |
| Central Córdoba | Santiago del Estero | Alfredo Terrara |
| Chaco For Ever | Resistencia | Juan Alberto García |
| Colón | Santa Fe | Brigadier General Estanislao López |
| Defensa y Justicia | Florencio Varela | Norberto "Tito" Tomaghello |
| Deportivo Laferrere | Gregorio de Laferrere | José Luis Sánchez |
| Deportivo Maipú | Maipú | Higinio Sperdutti |
| Deportivo Morón | Morón | Francisco Urbano |
| Douglas Haig | Pergamino | Miguel Morales |
| Instituto | Córdoba | Presidente Perón |
| Lanús | Lanús | Ciudad de Lanús |
| Nueva Chicago | Mataderos | Nueva Chicago |
| Racing | Córdoba | Miguel Sancho |
| San Martín | San Juan | Ingeniero Hilario Sánchez |
| San Martín | San Miguel de Tucumán | La Ciudadela |
| Sportivo Italiano | Ciudad Evita | Republica de Italia |
| Talleres | Remedios de Escalada | Talleres de Remedios de Escalada |
| Villa Dálmine | Campana | El Coliseo |

== Standings ==
Lanús was declared champion and was automatically promoted to Primera División, and the teams placed 2nd to 10th qualified for the Second Promotion Playoff.

| Pos | Team | Pld | W | D | L | GF | GA | GD | Pts | Promotion or qualification |
|---|---|---|---|---|---|---|---|---|---|---|
| 1 | Lanús | 42 | 21 | 15 | 6 | 64 | 34 | +30 | 57 | Champion, promoted to Primera División |
| 2 | Almirante Brown | 42 | 19 | 14 | 9 | 56 | 38 | +18 | 52 | Qualified for the Second Promotion Playoff Semifinals |
| 3 | Colón | 42 | 20 | 12 | 10 | 56 | 42 | +14 | 52 | Qualified for the Second Promotion Playoff Second Round |
| 4 | San Martín (T) | 42 | 18 | 15 | 9 | 65 | 49 | +16 | 51 | Qualified for the Second Promotion Playoff First Round |
| 5 | Douglas Haig | 42 | 16 | 18 | 8 | 49 | 39 | +10 | 50 | Qualified for the Second Promotion Playoff First Round |
| 6 | Nueva Chicago | 42 | 17 | 15 | 10 | 51 | 42 | +9 | 49 | Qualified for the Second Promotion Playoff First Round |
| 7 | Instituto | 42 | 16 | 15 | 11 | 47 | 39 | +8 | 47 | Qualified for the Second Promotion Playoff First Round |
| 8 | Atlético Tucumán | 42 | 16 | 14 | 12 | 54 | 41 | +13 | 46 | Qualified for the Second Promotion Playoff First Round |
| 9 | Chaco For Ever | 42 | 14 | 18 | 10 | 47 | 37 | +10 | 46 | Qualified for the Second Promotion Playoff First Round |
| 10 | Talleres (RE) | 42 | 14 | 16 | 12 | 45 | 40 | +5 | 44 | Qualified for the Second Promotion Playoff First Round |
| 11 | Racing (C) | 42 | 16 | 11 | 15 | 47 | 53 | −6 | 43 | |
| 12 | Central Córdoba (R) | 42 | 14 | 14 | 14 | 41 | 43 | −2 | 42 | |
| 13 | Deportivo Morón | 42 | 12 | 17 | 13 | 49 | 52 | −3 | 41 | |
| 14 | Banfield | 42 | 12 | 16 | 14 | 48 | 52 | −4 | 40 | |
| 15 | Deportivo Laferrere | 42 | 13 | 13 | 16 | 39 | 49 | −10 | 39 | |
| 16 | Sportivo Italiano | 42 | 10 | 18 | 14 | 42 | 43 | −1 | 38 | |
| 17 | Defensa y Justicia | 42 | 11 | 16 | 15 | 40 | 52 | −12 | 38 | |
| 18 | Atlético de Rafaela | 42 | 8 | 19 | 15 | 24 | 43 | −19 | 35 | |
| 19 | San Martín (SJ) | 42 | 8 | 17 | 17 | 26 | 53 | −27 | 33 | |
| 20 | Villa Dálmine | 42 | 3 | 23 | 16 | 37 | 53 | −16 | 29 | |
| 21 | Deportivo Maipú | 42 | 8 | 12 | 22 | 31 | 55 | −24 | 28 | |
| 22 | Central Córdoba (SdE) | 42 | 3 | 18 | 21 | 20 | 49 | −29 | 24 | |

== Second Promotion Playoff ==
The Second Promotion Playoff or Torneo Reducido was played by the teams placed 2nd to 10th in the overall standings: Almirante Brown (2nd), who entered in the Semifinals, Colón (3rd), who entered in the Second Round, San Martín (T) (4th), Douglas Haig (5th), Nueva Chicago (6th), Instituto (7th), Atlético Tucumán (8th), Chaco For Ever (9th) and Talleres (RE) (10th), the champion of Primera B Metropolitana: Ituzaingó, and Arsenal and Gimnasia y Tiro, both winners of Zonales Noroeste y Sureste from Torneo del Interior entered in the First Round.

=== Bracket ===
Round of 16
5 | Douglas Haig | 0 | 2 | 2
ZSE | Gimnasia y Tiro | 2 | 2 | 4
4 | San Martín (T) | 1 | 1 | 2
ZNO | Arsenal | 0 | 0 | 0
8 | Atlético Tucumán | 1 | 2 | 3
9 | Chaco For Ever | 0 | 0 | 0
6 | Nueva Chicago | 3 | 2 | 5
PBM | Ituzaingó | 0 | 1 | 1
7 | Instituto | 2 | 2 | 4
10 | Talleres (RE) | 0 | 1 | 1

Quarterfinals
3 | Colón | 3 | 0 | 3
ZSE | Gimnasia y Tiro | 4 | 1 | 5
4 | San Martín (T)^{1} | 1 | 0 | 1
8 | Atlético Tucumán | 1 | 0 | 1
6 | Nueva Chicago | 1 | 3 | 4
7 | Instituto | 2 | 1 | 3

Semifinals
2 | Almirante Brown | 1 | 3 | 4
ZSE | Gimnasia y Tiro | 0 | 0 | 0
4 | San Martín (T) | 0 | 1 | 1
6 | Nueva Chicago | 0 | 0 | 0

Finals
2 | Almirante Brown | 0 | 1 | 1
4 | San Martín (T) | 1 | 1 | 2

1: Qualified because of sport advantage.

- Note: The team in the first line plays at home the second leg.

=== Final ===
Torneo Reducido Final
(2nd. promotion playoff)
19 July 1992
First leg

| San Martín (T) | 1–0 | Almirante Brown |

Estadio La Ciudadela, Tucumán

25 July 1992
Second leg

| Almirante Brown | 1–1 | San Martín (T) |
|---|---|---|
| Cardozo 16' | Report | Scime 66' |

Estadio Fragata Sarmiento, Isidro Casanova

Team details

Almirante Brown
San Martín (T)

| GK | Claudio Mele |
| DF | Hugo Ayala |
| DF | Daniel Martínez |
| DF | Ricardo Johansen |
| DF | Gabriel Pastor |
| MF | Gustavo Godoy | Red card |
| MF | Alejandro Rubinich |
| MF | Marcelo Grioni |
| MF | Nelson Roldán | | (substituted off) 70' |
| FW | Carlos Cardozo |
| FW | Oscar Osorio | | (substituted off) 53' |
Substitutes:
| FW | Fabián Bustos | | (substituted on) 53' |
| FW | Juan D. Sen | | (substituted on) 70' |
Manager:
(Argentina) Osvaldo Piazza

| GK | Francisco Guillén |
| DF | Mario A. Jiménez |
| DF | Luis Moreno |
| DF | Gustavo Rescaldani |
| DF | Pedro Robles |
| MF | Erasmo Doroni |
| MF | Juan Daza |
| MF | Carlos Scime |
| MF | Raúl Roldán | | (substituted off) 53' |
| FW | Jorge O. López | Red card |
| FW | Fernando Di Carlo | | (substituted off) 63' |
Substitutes:
| MF | Daniel Bini | | (substituted on) 53' |
| FW | Juan C. Minotto | (substituted on) 63' (red card) |
Manager:
(Uruguay) Nelson Chabay

Note: San Martín de Tucumán won 2–1 on aggregate, promoting to Primera División

== Relegation ==
| Pos | Team | 1989–90 Pts | 1990–91 Pts | 1991–92 Pts | Total Pts | Total Pld | Avg | Situation | Affiliation |
|---|---|---|---|---|---|---|---|---|---|
| 1 | Lanús | 47 | — | 57 | 104 | 84 | 1.238 | | Direct |
| 2 | San Martín (T) | 48 | 48 | 51 | 147 | 126 | 1.167 | | Indirect |
| 3 | Nueva Chicago | — | — | 49 | 49 | 42 | 1.167 | | Direct |
| 4 | Douglas Haig | 51 | 44 | 50 | 145 | 126 | 1.151 | | Indirect |
| 5 | Atlético Tucumán | 43 | 52 | 46 | 141 | 126 | 1.135 | | Indirect |
| 6 | Chaco For Ever | — | — | 46 | 46 | 42 | 1.095 | | Indirect |
| 7 | Almirante Brown | 39 | 46 | 52 | 137 | 126 | 1.087 | | Direct |
| 8 | Instituto | — | 44 | 47 | 91 | 84 | 1.083 | | Indirect |
| 9 | Banfield | 46 | 47 | 40 | 133 | 126 | 1.056 | | Direct |
| 10 | Colón | 45 | 36 | 52 | 133 | 126 | 1.056 | | Direct |
| 11 | Central Córdoba (R) | — | — | 42 | 42 | 42 | 1 | | Direct |
| 12 | Deportivo Morón | — | 43 | 41 | 84 | 84 | 1 | | Direct |
| 13 | Racing (C) | — | 40 | 43 | 83 | 84 | 0.988 | Relegation Playoff Matches | Indirect |
| 14 | Atlético de Rafaela | 47 | 42 | 35 | 124 | 126 | 0.984 | Relegation Playoff Matches | Indirect |
| 15 | Talleres (RE) | 35 | 41 | 44 | 120 | 126 | 0.952 | | Direct |
| 16 | Sportivo Italiano | 46 | 34 | 38 | 118 | 126 | 0.937 | | Direct |
| 17 | Deportivo Laferrere | — | 39 | 39 | 78 | 84 | 0.929 | | Direct |
| 18 | Villa Dálmine | 44 | 39 | 29 | 112 | 126 | 0.889 | | Direct |
| 19 | Defensa y Justicia | 35 | 38 | 38 | 111 | 126 | 0.881 | | Direct |
| 20 | Deportivo Maipú | 35 | 38 | 28 | 101 | 126 | 0.802 | Liga Mendocina de fútbol | Indirect |
| 21 | San Martín (SJ) | — | — | 33 | 33 | 42 | 0.786 | Liga Sanjuanina de fútbol | Indirect |
| 22 | Central Córdoba (SdE) | 37 | 33 | 24 | 94 | 126 | 0.746 | Liga Santiagueña de Fútbol | Indirect |

Note: Clubs with indirect affiliation with AFA are relegated to their respective league of his province according to the Argentine football league system, while clubs directly affiliated face relegation to Primera B Metropolitana. Clubs with direct affiliation are all from Greater Buenos Aires, with the exception of Newell's, Rosario Central, Central Córdoba and Argentino de Rosario, all from Rosario, and Unión and Colón from Santa Fe.

=== Relegation Playoff Matches ===
Each tie was played on a home-and-away two-legged basis, but if the first match was won by the team of Primera B Nacional (who also played the first leg at home), there was no need to play the second. If instead, the team from the Regional leagues wins the first leg, the second leg must be played, leg that, if its won by the team of Primera B Nacional, a third leg must be played, if the third leg finishes in a tie, the team from Primera B Nacional remains on it. This season, Racing (C) had to defend their spot in Primera B Nacional against General Paz Juniors, from the Liga Cordobesa de fútbol, and Atlético de Rafaela had to defend their spot in Primera B Nacional against 9 de Julio (R), from the Liga Rafaelina de fútbol.

Relegation Playoff 1
| Home | Result | Away |
|---|---|---|
| Racing (C) | 2–1 | General Paz Juniors |

- Racing (C) remains in Primera B Nacional.

Relegation Playoff 2
| Home | Result | Away |
|---|---|---|
| Atlético de Rafaela | 1–0 | 9 de Julio (R) |

- Atletico de Rafaela remains in Primera B Nacional.

== See also ==
- 1991–92 in Argentine football
