= 1990–91 Primera B Nacional =

5th season of the second-tier football league in Argentina

Primera B Nacional
- Season: 1990–91
- Champions: Quilmes (1st divisional title)
- Promoted: Quilmes; Belgrano
- Relegated: Tigre; Cipolletti; Atlanta
- Top goalscorer: Roberto Oste (24 goals)

The 1990–91 Argentine Primera B Nacional was the fifth season of second division professional of football in Argentina. A total of 22 teams competed; the champion and runner-up were promoted to Argentine Primera División.

== Club information ==
Club	City	Stadium
Almirante Brown	Isidro Casanova	Fragata Presidente Sarmiento
Atlanta	Villa Crespo	León Kolbovski
Atlético de Rafaela	Rafaela	Nuevo Monumental
Atlético Tucumán	San Miguel de Tucumán	Monumental Presidente Jose Fierro
Banfield	Banfield	Florencio Solá
Belgrano	Córdoba	El Gigante de Alberdi
Central Córdoba	Santiago del Estero	Alfredo Terrara
Cipolletti	Cipolletti	La Visera de Cemento
Colón	Santa Fe	Brigadier General Estanislao López
Defensa y Justicia	Florencio Varela	Norberto "Tito" Tomaghello
Deportivo Laferrere	Gregorio de Laferrere	José Luis Sánchez
Deportivo Maipú	Maipú	Higinio Sperdutti
Deportivo Morón	Morón	Francisco Urbano
Douglas Haig	Pergamino	Miguel Morales
Instituto	Córdoba	Presidente Perón
Quilmes	Quilmes	Centenario
Racing	Córdoba	Miguel Sancho
San Martín	San Miguel de Tucumán	La Ciudadela
Sportivo Italiano	Ciudad Evita	Republica de Italia
Talleres	Remedios de Escalada	Talleres de Remedios de Escalada
Tigre	Victoria	José Dellagiovanna
Villa Dálmine	Campana	El Coliseo

== Standings ==
Quilmes was declared champion and was automatically promoted to Primera División, and the teams placed 2nd to 10th qualified for the Second Promotion Playoff.

Pos	Team	Pld	W	D	L	GF	GA	GD	Pts	Promotion or qualification
1	Quilmes	42	19	16	7	53	28	+25	54	Champion, promoted to Primera División.
2	Atlético Tucumán	42	17	18	7	62	40	+22	52	Qualified for the Second Promotion Playoff Semifinals
3	Belgrano	42	20	12	10	53	34	+19	52	Qualified for the Second Promotion Playoff Second Round
4	Cipolletti	42	18	12	12	54	38	+16	48 (Note: Did not qualify for the Second Promotion Playoff as it was involved in pelegation)	
5	San Martín (T)	42	16	16	10	39	33	+6	48	Qualified for the Second Promotion Playoff First Round
6	Banfield	42	13	21	8	45	38	+7	47	Qualified for the Second Promotion Playoff First Round
7	Almirante Brown	42	14	18	10	42	29	+13	46	Qualified for the Second Promotion Playoff First Round
8	Instituto	42	12	20	10	49	45	+4	44	Qualified for the Second Promotion Playoff First Round
9	Douglas Haig	42	14	16	12	37	37	0	44	Qualified for the Second Promotion Playoff First Round
10	Deportivo Morón	42	13	17	12	42	43	−1	43	Qualified for the Second Promotion Playoff First Round
11	Atlético de Rafaela	42	17	8	17	51	48	+3	42	Qualified for the Second Promotion Playoff First Round
12	Tigre	42	15	12	15	34	36	−2	42	
13	Talleres (RE)	42	11	19	12	47	54	−7	41	
14	Racing (C)	42	11	18	13	51	54	−3	40	
15	Villa Dálmine	42	13	13	16	30	37	−7	39	
16	Deportivo Laferrere	42	12	15	15	36	49	−13	39	
17	Defensa y Justicia	42	11	16	15	44	51	−7	38	
18	Deportivo Maipú	42	13	12	17	41	48	−7	38	
19	Colón	42	10	16	16	37	47	−10	36	
20	Sportivo Italiano	42	11	12	19	47	53	−6	34	
21	Central Córdoba (SdE)	42	11	11	20	52	74	−22	33	
22	Atlanta	42	7	10	25	32	62	−30	16 (Note: 8 points deducted for violence acts.)	

== Second Promotion Playoff ==
The Second Promotion Playoff or Torneo Reducido was played by the teams placed 2nd to 11th in the overall standings: Atlético Tucumán (2nd), who entered in the Semifinals, Belgrano (3rd), who entered in the Second Round, and in the first round entered San Martín (T) (5th), Banfield (6th), Almirante Brown (7th), Instituto (8th), Douglas Haig (9th), Deportivo Morón (10th) and Atlético de Rafaela (11th), (Cipolletti (4th) did not qualify because it was relegated). In the first round also participated the champion of Primera B Metropolitana: Central Córdoba (R), and Nueva Chicago and San Martín (SJ), both winners of Zonales Noroeste y Sureste from Torneo del Interior. The winner was promoted to Primera División.

=== Bracket ===
Round of 16
7	Almirante Brown	3	4	7
PBM	Central Córdoba (R)	3	6	9
5	San Martín (T)^{1}	0	0	0
ZSE	San Martín (SJ)	0	0	0
9	Douglas Haig	4	2	6
10	Deportivo Morón	2	2	4
6	Banfield	1	3	4
ZNO	Nueva Chicago	1	0	1
8	Instituto	1	2	3
11	Atlético de Rafaela	1	1	2

Quarterfinals
3	Belgrano	3	3	6
PBM	Central Córdoba (R)	3	1	4
5	San Martín (T)	3	2	5
9	Douglas Haig	2	0	2
6	Banfield	0	1	1
8	Instituto	0	0	0

Semifinals
3	Belgrano^{1}	0	2	2
5	San Martín (T)	1	1	2
2	Atlético Tucumán	0	0	0
6	Banfield	2	2	4

Finals
3	Belgrano	1	4	5
6	Banfield	2	0	2

1: Qualified because of sport advantage.

- Note: The team in the first line plays at home the second leg.

=== Final ===
Torneo Reducido Final
(2nd. promotion playoff)
20 July 1991
First leg

Banfield	2–1	Belgrano (C)
Cinto		Heredia

Estadio Florencio Sola, Banfield

28 July 1991
Second leg

Belgrano (C)	4–0	Banfield
Alonso 38', 56'; Herrera 41'; Monserrat 89'	Report

Estadio Chateau Carreras, Córdoba
Referee: Juan Bava

Team details

Belgrano (C)
Banfield

GK	Javier Sodero
DF	Ángel C. Cortés
DF	José Flores
DF	Enrique Nieto
DF	Marcelo Flores
MF	Víctor Heredia
MF	Daniel L. Alonso
MF	Roberto Monserrat
FW	Juan Spallina
FW	Luis E. Sosa
FW	Omar Herrera
Manager:
(Argentina) Jorge Guyón

GK	Sergio García
DF	Hugo Parrado
DF	Juan J. Sánchez
DF	Pablo Lizarraga
DF	Héctor Godoy
MF	Fabián Berrutti
MF	Jorge Jiménez	(substituted off) 57'
MF	Horacio Garcia
FW	Daniel A. Delfino	(substituted off) 46'
FW	Gabriel Patrizio
FW	Fernando Cinto
Substitutes:
DF	Miguel Jerez	(substituted on) 46'
FW	Christian Daguerre	(substituted on) 57'
Manager:
(Argentina) Alberto Tardivo

Note: Belgrano won 5–2 on aggregate, promoting to Primera División

== Relegation ==
Pos	Team	1988–89 Pts	1989–90 Pts	1990–91 Pts	Total Pts	Total Pld	Avg	Situation	Affiliation
1	Belgrano	50	47	52	149	126	1.183		Indirect
2	San Martín (T)	—	48	48	96	84	1.143		Indirect
3	Quilmes	37	53	54	144	126	1.143		Direct
4	Atlético Tucumán	45	43	52	140	126	1.111		Indirect
5	Banfield	44	46	47	137	126	1.087		Direct
6	Almirante Brown	51	39	46	136	126	1.079		Direct
7	Atlético de Rafaela	—	47	42	89	84	1.06		Indirect
8	Instituto	—	—	44	44	42	1.048		Indirect
9	Colón	50	45	36	131	126	1.04		Direct
10	Deportivo Morón	—	—	43	43	42	1.024		Direct
11	Douglas Haig	32	51	44	127	126	1.008		Indirect
12	Sportivo Italiano	46	46	34	126	126	1		Direct
13	Villa Dálmine	—	44	39	83	84	0.988		Direct
14	Talleres (RE)	48	35	41	124	126	0.984		Direct
15	Defensa y Justicia	49	35	38	122	126	0.968		Direct
16	Racing (C)	—	—	40	40	42	0.952		Indirect
17	Deportivo Laferrere	—	—	39	39	42	0.929		Direct
18	Deportivo Maipú	43	35	38	116	126	0.921	Relegation Playoff Matches	Indirect
19	Central Córdoba (SdE)	43	37	33	113	126	0.897	Additional Playoff	Indirect
20	Tigre	30	41	42	113	126	0.897	Additional Playoff	Direct
21	Cipolletti	28	33	48	109	126	0.865	Liga Deportiva Confluencia	Indirect
22	Atlanta	—	—	16	16	42	0.381	Primera B Metropolitana	Direct

Note: Clubs with indirect affiliation with AFA are relegated to their respective league of his province according to the Argentine football league system, while clubs directly affiliated face relegation to Primera B Metropolitana. Clubs with direct affiliation are all from Greater Buenos Aires, with the exception of Newell's, Rosario Central, Central Córdoba and Argentino de Rosario, all from Rosario, and Unión and Colón from Santa Fe.

=== Additional Playoff ===
Since Central Córdoba (SdE) and Tigre finished with the same relegation co-efficient at the dividing line, a one-match playoff was held to determine who was relegated. Tigre lost so their got relegated to Primera B Metropolitana, while Central Cordoba (SdE) remained in Primera B Nacional.

Additional Playoff
Home	Result	Away
Central Córdoba (SdE)	3 - 0	Tigre

=== Relegation Playoff Matches ===
Each tie was played on a home-and-away two-legged basis, but if the first match was won by the team of Primera B Nacional (who also played the first leg at home), there was no need to play the second. If instead, the team from the Regional leagues wins the first leg, the second leg must be played, leg that, if its won by the team of Primera B Nacional, a third leg must be played, if the third leg finishes in a tie, the team from Primera B Nacional remains on it. This season Deportivo Maipú had to defend their spot in Primera B Nacional against Godoy Cruz from the Liga Mendocina de fútbol.

Relegation Playoff
Home	Result	Away
Deportivo Maipú	2 - 1	Godoy Cruz

- Deportivo Maipú remains in Primera B Nacional.

== See also ==
- 1990–91 in Argentine football
