= 1987–88 Primera B Nacional =

2nd season of the second-tier football league in Argentina

Primera B Nacional
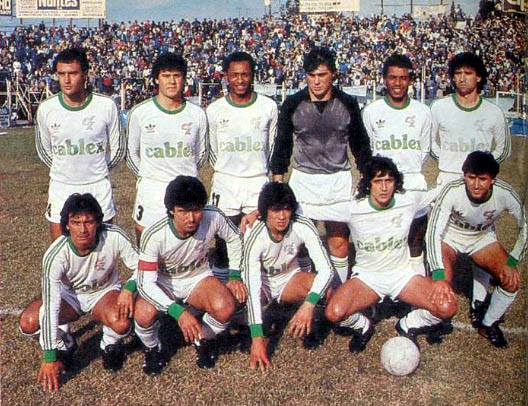
- Deportivo Mandiyú, champion
- Season: 1987–88
- Champions: Deportivo Mandiyú (1st title)
- Promoted: Deportivo Mandiyú; San Martin (T)
- Relegated: Guaraní Antonio Franco; Ferro Carril Oeste (GP); Gimnasia y Esgrima (J)
- Top goalscorer: Daniel Leani (24)

The 1987–88 Argentine Primera B Nacional was the 2nd. season of second division professional of football in Argentina. A total of 22 teams competed; the champion and runner-up were promoted to Argentine Primera División. Deportivo Mandiyú of Corrientes Province won the championship, promoting to Primera along with San Martín de Tucumán.

On the other hand, Guaraní Antonio Franco, Ferro Carril Oeste (General Pico) and Gimnasia y Esgrima de Jujuy were relegated.

== Club information ==
Club	City	Stadium
Almirante Brown	Isidro Casanova	Fragata Presidente Sarmiento
Atlético Tucumán	San Miguel de Tucumán	Monumental Presidente Jose Fierro
Belgrano	Córdoba	El Gigante de Alberdi
Central Córdoba	Santiago del Estero	Alfredo Terrara
Chacarita Juniors	Villa Maipú	Chacarita Juniors
Chaco For Ever	Resistencia	Juan Alberto García
Cipolletti	Cipolletti	La Visera de Cemento
Colón	Santa Fe	Brigadier General Estanislao López
Defensa y Justicia	Florencio Varela	Norberto "Tito" Tomaghello
Deportivo Maipú	Maipú	Higinio Sperdutti
Deportivo Mandiyú	Corrientes	José A. Romero Feris^{1}
Douglas Haig	Pergamino	Miguel Morales
Ferro Carril Oeste	General Pico	Coloso de Barrio Talleres
Gimnasia y Esgrima	Jujuy	23 de Agosto
Guaraní Antonio Franco	Posadas	Clemente Fernandez de Oliveira
Huracán	Buenos Aires	Tomás Adolfo Ducó
Lanús	Lanús	Ciudad de Lanús
Los Andes	Lomas de Zamora	Eduardo Gallardón
Quilmes	Quilmes	Centenario
Sportivo Italiano	Ciudad Evita	Republica de Italia
Temperley	Temperley	Alfredo Beranger
Tigre	Victoria	José Dellagiovanna

1: Property of Huracán Corrientes.

== Standings ==
Deportivo Mandiyú was declared champion and was automatically promoted to Primera División, and the teams placed 2nd to 10th qualified for the Second Promotion Playoff.

Pos	Team	Pld	W	D	L	GF	GA	GD	Pts	Promotion or qualification
1	Deportivo Mandiyú	42	20	18	4	54	24	+30	58	Champion, promoted to Primera División
2	Quilmes	42	20	14	8	50	34	+16	54	Qualified for the Second Promotion Playoff Semifinals
3	Cipolletti	42	19	14	9	51	31	+20	52	Qualified for the Second Promotion Playoff Second Round
4	Chaco For Ever	42	18	15	9	59	44	+15	51	Qualified for the Second Promotion Playoff First Round
5	Tigre	42	19	11	12	55	44	+11	49	Qualified for the Second Promotion Playoff First Round
6	Belgrano	42	18	13	11	50	44	+6	49	Qualified for the Second Promotion Playoff First Round
7	Huracán	42	19	10	13	54	38	+16	48	Qualified for the Second Promotion Playoff First Round
8	Colón	42	18	12	12	50	45	+5	48	Qualified for the Second Promotion Playoff First Round
9	Atlético Tucumán	42	14	17	11	57	51	+6	45	Qualified for the Second Promotion Playoff First Round
10	Douglas Haig	42	12	19	11	45	41	+4	43	Qualified for the Second Promotion Playoff First Round
11	Chacarita Juniors	42	13	17	12	42	43	−1	43	
12	Central Córdoba (SdE)	42	13	16	13	57	58	−1	42	
13	Sportivo Italiano	42	13	15	14	51	54	−3	41	
14	Almirante Brown	42	14	12	16	51	54	−3	40	
15	Deportivo Maipú	42	11	18	13	47	52	−5	40	
16	Defensa y Justicia	42	11	16	15	43	35	+8	38	
17	Guaraní Antonio Franco	42	13	12	17	45	47	−2	38	
18	Temperley	42	11	16	15	47	51	−4	38	
19	Lanús	42	11	13	18	64	69	−5	35	
20	Los Andes	42	12	9	21	45	63	−18	33	
21	Ferro Carril Oeste (GP)	42	6	13	23	31	67	−36	25	
22	Gimnasia y Esgrima (J)	42	4	6	32	23	82	−59	14	

== Second Promotion Playoff ==
The Second Promotion Playoff or Torneo Reducido was played by the teams placed 2nd to 10th in the overall standings: Quilmes (2nd), who entered in the Semifinals, Cipolletti (3rd) who entered in the Second Round, Chaco For Ever (4th), Tigre (5th), Belgrano (6th), Huracán (7th), Colón (8th), Atlético Tucumán (9th), Douglas Haig (10th); the champion of Primera B Metropolitana: Talleres (RE), San Martin (T) and Estación Quequén, both winners of Zonales Noroeste y Sureste from Torneo del Interior. The winner was promoted to Primera División.

First Round
First Leg
Home	Result	Away
Douglas Haig	0 - 3	Huracán
Talleres (RE)	0 - 0	Belgrano
Atlético Tucumán	1 - 0	Colón
San Martin (T)	1 - 0	Tigre
Estación Quequén	1 - 3	Chaco For Ever
Second Leg
Huracán	2 - 2	Douglas Haig
Belgrano	4 - 1	Talleres (RE)
Colón^{1}	1 - 0	Atlético Tucumán
Tigre	0 - 1	San Martin (T)
Chaco For Ever	1 - 1	Estación Quequén

Second Round
First Leg
Home	Result	Away
Huracán	3 - 1	Belgrano
San Martin (T)	5 - 2	Cipolletti
Colón	1 - 0	Chaco For Ever
Second Leg
Belgrano	1 - 1	Huracán
Cipolletti	1 - 1	San Martin (T)
Chaco For Ever^{1}	2 - 1	Colón

Semifinals
First Leg
Home	Result	Away
Huracán	1 - 0	Chaco For Ever
San Martin (T)	0 - 0	Quilmes
Second Leg
Chaco For Ever^{1}	1 - 0	Huracán
Quilmes	1 - 2	San Martin (T)

1: Qualified because of sport advantage.

=== Final ===
Torneo Reducido Final
(2nd. Promotion playoff)
24 Jul 1988
First leg

San Martin (T)	1–0	Chaco For Ever
Noriega	Report

Estadio La Ciudadela, Tucumán

31 Jul 1988
Second leg

Chaco For Ever	0–2	San Martin (T)
	Report	Noriega 28'; J. López 69'

Estadio Juan A. García, Resistencia

Team details

Chaco For Ever
San Martín (T)

Note: San Martín de Tucumán won 3–0 on aggregate, promoting to Primera División.

== Relegation ==
Pos	Team	1985 Pts	Ap 1986 Pts	1986–87 Pts	1987–88 Pts	Total Pts	Total Pld	Avg	Situation	Affiliation
1	Deportivo Mandiyú	—	—	48	58	106	84	1.262		Indirect
2	Belgrano	—	—	54	49	103	84	1.226		Indirect
3	Huracán	—	—	54	48	102	84	1.214		Direct
4	Chaco For Ever	—	—	48	51	99	84	1.179		Indirect
5	Colón^{1}	43	21	54	48	166	144	1.153		Direct
6	Quilmes^{2}	47	11	48	54	160	144	1.111		Direct
7	Atlético Tucumán	—	—	—	45	45	42	1.071		Indirect
8	Deportivo Maipú	—	—	49	40	89	84	1.06		Indirect
9	Lanús^{1}	47	21	47	35	150	144	1.042		Direct
10	Cipolletti	—	—	35	52	87	84	1.036		Indirect
11	Tigre^{1}	36	23	38	49	146	144	1.014		Direct
12	Defensa y Justicia^{1}	—	21	43	38	102	102	1		Direct
13	Douglas Haig	—	—	41	43	84	84	1		Indirect
14	Los Andes^{1}	47	23	40	33	143	144	0.993		Direct
15	Sportivo Italiano	—	—	—	41	41	42	0.976		Direct
16	Central Córdoba (SdE)	—	—	37	42	79	84	0.94	Relegation Playoff Matches	Indirect
17	Almirante Brown^{2}	31	17	45	40	133	144	0.924		Direct
18	Chacarita Juniors	—	—	34	43	77	84	0.917		Direct
19	Temperley	—	—	—	38	38	42	0.905		Direct
20	Guaraní Antonio Franco	—	—	35	38	73	84	0.869	Liga Posadeña de fútbol	Indirect
21	Ferro Carril Oeste (GP)	—	—	36	25	61	84	0.726	Liga Pampeana de fútbol	Indirect
22	Gimnasia y Esgrima (J)	—	—	34	14	48	84	0.571	Liga Jujeña de Fútbol	Indirect

1: They kept the points earned in previous editions of the Primera B Metropolitana, although the category was new. 2: Despite they were promoted to play this season the points earned in previous editions of the Primera B Metropolitana were used to calculate averages, plus those achieved in the previous two tournaments.

Note: Clubs with indirect affiliation with AFA are relegated to their respective league of his province according to the Argentine football league system, while clubs directly affiliated face relegation to Primera B Metropolitana. Clubs with direct affiliation are all from Greater Buenos Aires, with the exception of Newell's, Rosario Central, Central Córdoba and Argentino de Rosario, all from Rosario, and Unión and Colón from Santa Fe.

=== Relegation Playoff Matches ===
Each tie was played on a home-and-away two-legged basis. This season, Central Córdoba (SdE) had to play against Güemes (SdE) from the Liga Santiagueña de Fútbol.

Relegation Playoff 1
First Leg
Home	Result	Away
Güemes (SdE)	1 - 2	Central Córdoba (SdE)
Second Leg
Central Córdoba (SdE)	0 - 0	Güemes (SdE)

- Central Córdoba (SdE) remains in Primera B Nacional.

== Top scorers ==
Rank.	Player	Club	Goals
1	(Argentina) Daniel Leani	Quilmes	24
2	(Argentina) Mario Noremberg	Chaco For Ever	18
2	(Argentina) Marcelo Reggiardo	Almirante Brown	18
3	(Argentina) Raúl Aredes	Atlético Tucumán	17

== See also ==
- 1987–88 in Argentine football
