= 1993–94 Argentine Primera División =

Primera División
- Season: 1993–94
- Dates: 10 September 1993 – 28 August 1994
- Champions: Apertura: River Plate (25th. title); Clausura: Independiente (15th. title)
- 1995 Copa Libertadores: River Plate; Independiente
- 1994 Copa CONMEBOL: San Lorenzo; Huracán; Lanús

The 1993–94 Argentine Primera División was a season of top-flight professional football in Argentina. The league season had two champions, with River Plate winning the Apertura (25th. league title for the club), while Independiente won the Clausura championship (15th. league title). Banfield (as champion of 1992–93 Primera B Nacional) and Gimnasia y Tiro (winner of "Torneo Octogonal" after beating Central Córdoba de Rosario in a two-legged series) promoted from the Primera B Nacional (second division).

On the other hand, Gimnasia y Tiro and Estudiantes de La Plata were relegated to Primera B Nacional.

== Torneo Apertura ==
Apertura
- Season: 1993
- Dates: 10 September 1993 – 19 March 1994
- Champions: River Plate (25th. title)
- Promoted: Banfield; Gimnasia y Tiro
- Top goalscorer: Sergio Martínez (12 goals)
- Biggest home win: Argentinos Jrs. 6–0 Dep. Español (7 Nov 1993); Boca Jrs. 6–0 Racing (13 Mar 1994)
- Biggest away win: Belgrano (C) 1–5 River Plate (31 Oct 1993)
- Highest scoring: River Plate 5–3 Dep. Mandiyú (4 Mar 1994)

=== Final standings ===
Pos	Team	Pld	W	D	L	GF	GA	GD	Pts
1	River Plate	19	9	6	4	29	17	+12	24
2	Vélez Sársfield	19	8	7	4	19	14	+5	23
3	Racing	19	8	7	4	23	20	+3	23
4	Boca Juniors	19	8	6	5	25	12	+13	22
5	Independiente	19	7	8	4	27	20	+7	22
6	Lanús	19	6	10	3	23	18	+5	22
7	Gimnasia y Esgrima (LP)	19	6	9	4	21	15	+6	21
8	San Lorenzo	19	8	5	6	23	20	+3	21
9	Banfield	19	6	8	5	20	17	+3	20
10	Ferro Carril Oeste	19	4	11	4	17	20	−3	19
11	Argentinos Juniors	19	4	10	5	23	20	+3	18
12	Huracán	19	5	8	6	22	23	−1	18
13	Deportivo Mandiyú	19	5	7	7	25	24	+1	17
14	Platense	19	4	9	6	22	24	−2	17
15	Newell's Old Boys	19	4	9	6	16	22	−6	17
16	Gimnasia y Tiro	19	5	6	8	16	25	−9	16
17	Belgrano	19	4	8	7	18	30	−12	16
18	Rosario Central	19	2	11	6	15	24	−9	15
19	Deportivo Español	19	3	9	7	8	20	−12	15
20	Estudiantes (LP)	19	3	8	8	16	23	−7	14

=== Top scorers ===
Rank.	Player	Team	Goals
1	(Uruguay) Sergio Martínez	Boca Juniors	12
2	(Honduras) Eduardo Bennett	San Lorenzo	8
2	(Argentina) Ramón Medina Bello	River Plate	8
2	(Argentina) Claudio Spontón	Platense	8
2	(Paraguay) Arsenio Benítez	Deportivo Mandiyú	8
2	(Argentina) Juan Ramón Fleita	Racing	8
2	(Argentina) Norberto Ortega Sánchez	Argentinos Juniors	8

== Torneo Clausura ==
Clausura
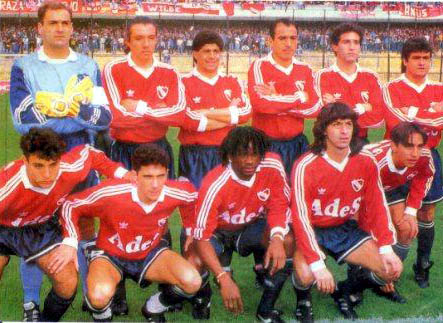
- Independiente, Clausura champions
- Season: 1994
- Dates: 25 March – 28 August 1994
- Champions: Independiente (15th. title)
- Relegated: Estudiantes LP; Gimnasia y Tiro
- Top goalscorer: Hernán Crespo; Marcelo Espina (13 goals each)
- Biggest home win: Banfield 5–0 Dep. Español (22 May)
- Biggest away win: GELP 1–5 Independiente (21 Aug)

=== Final standings ===
Pos	Team	Pld	W	D	L	GF	GA	GD	Pts	Qualification
1	Independiente	19	8	10	1	32	13	+19	26	1995 Copa Libertadores
2	Huracán	19	10	5	4	25	22	+3	25	1994 Copa CONMEBOL
3	Rosario Central	19	8	7	4	26	14	+12	23	
4	San Lorenzo	19	8	7	4	22	15	+7	23	
5	River Plate	19	7	7	5	24	14	+10	21	
6	Platense	19	7	7	5	28	23	+5	21	
7	Boca Juniors	19	6	8	5	25	19	+6	20	
8	Banfield	19	8	4	7	23	20	+3	20	
9	Belgrano	19	6	7	6	16	17	−1	19	
10	Newell's Old Boys	19	7	5	7	16	18	−2	19	
11	Lanús	19	6	7	6	23	26	−3	19	
12	Racing	19	6	7	6	14	17	−3	19	
13	Argentinos Juniors	19	3	12	4	23	24	−1	18	
14	Deportivo Español	19	3	11	5	13	20	−7	17	
15	Ferro Carril Oeste	19	5	6	8	13	17	−4	16	
16	Estudiantes (LP)	19	5	6	8	23	29	−6	16	
17	Gimnasia y Esgrima (LP)	19	5	6	8	20	29	−9	16	
18	Vélez Sársfield	19	4	7	8	23	31	−8	15	
19	Gimnasia y Tiro	19	4	6	9	15	26	−11	14	
20	Deportivo Mandiyú	19	3	7	9	17	27	−10	13	

=== Top scorers ===
Rank.	Player	Team	Goals
1	(Argentina) Hernán Crespo	River Plate	11
1	(Argentina) Marcelo Espina	Platense	11
2	(Uruguay) Sergio Martínez	Boca Juniors	8
2	(Argentina) Claudio Spontón	Platense	8
3	(Argentina) Rubén Capria	Estudiantes LP	7

== Relegation ==
Team	Average	Points	Played	1991–92	1992–93	1993-94
River Plate	1.281	146	114	55	46	45
Boca Juniors	1.228	140	114	50	48	42
Vélez Sársfield	1.175	134	114	48	48	38
Independiente	1.096	125	114	36	41	48
Huracán	1.088	124	114	38	43	43
San Lorenzo	1.079	123	114	34	45	44
Banfield	1.053	40	38	N/A	N/A	40
Deportivo Español	1.035	118	114	45	41	32
Lanús	1.026	78	76	N/A	37	41
Racing	1.026	117	114	39	36	42
Gimnasia y Esgrima (LP)	0.982	112	114	41	34	37
Rosario Central	0.974	111	114	34	39	38
Ferro Carril Oeste	0.965	110	114	37	38	35
Belgrano	0.947	108	114	35	38	35
Platense	0.947	108	114	42	28	38
Newell's Old Boys	0.921	105	114	44	25	36
Argentinos Juniors	0.912	104	114	35	33	36
Deportivo Mandiyú	0.877	100	114	33	37	30
Estudiantes (LP)	0.851	97	114	29	38	30
Gimnasia y Tiro	0.789	30	38	N/A	N/A	30

== See also ==
- 1993–94 in Argentine football
