= Gabriel Schürrer =

Argentine footballer and manager

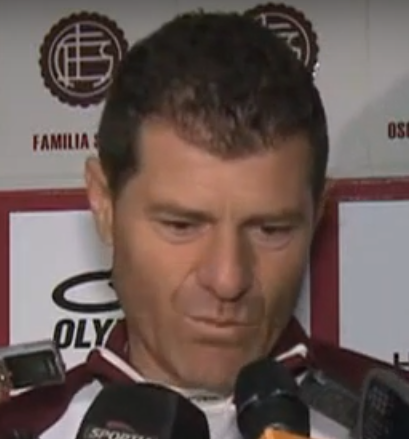
- Schürrer in 2012

Personal information
- Full name: Gabriel Francisco Schürrer Peralta
- Date of birth: 16 August 1971 (age 55)
- Place of birth: Rafaela, Argentina
- Height: 1.84 m (6 ft 0 in)
- Position: Centre-back

Youth career
- Lanús

Senior career*
| Years | Team | Apps | (Gls) |
| 1988–1996 | Lanús | 200 | (23) |
| 1989–1990 | → Atlético Rafaela (loan) | | |
| 1996–1998 | Racing Santander | 68 | (5) |
| 1998–2000 | Deportivo La Coruña | 47 | (3) |
| 2000–2002 | Las Palmas | 64 | (4) |
| 2002–2004 | Real Sociedad | 56 | (1) |
| 2004–2006 | Olympiacos | 40 | (1) |
| 2006–2007 | Málaga | 9 | (0) |
| Total | | 484 | (37) |

International career
| 1995 | Argentina | 4 | (0) |

Managerial career
- 2010–2012: Lanús
- 2012–2013: Argentinos Juniors
- 2014–2015: Crucero del Norte
- 2015: Gimnasia Jujuy
- 2016: Sarmiento
- 2017: Deportivo Cuenca
- 2018: Independiente del Valle
- 2019: Aucas
- 2020: Blooming
- 2021: Mitre (SdE)
- 2022: Deportivo Cuenca
- 2023: Panetolikos
- 2025: Mitre (SdE)
- 2025: Vinotinto Ecuador
- * Club domestic league appearances and goals

Gabriel Francisco Schürrer Peralta (born in Rafaela16 August 1971) is an Argentine professional football manager and former player.

He spent the better part of his career in Spain, appearing as a defender for five different clubs in nearly one full decade (1996 to 2004, 2006–07) and amassing La Liga totals of 235 games and 13 goals.

== Playing career ==
=== Club ===
Born in Rafaela, Santa Fe Province, Schürrer was best known for his eight-year stint in four La Liga clubs (two seasons apiece), most notably with Deportivo de La Coruña where he helped with 19 league games in the team's 1999–2000 league conquest. In 2004, he moved to Greece with Olympiacos FC, where he also remained two seasons.

After retiring at the end of the 2006–07 campaign at the age of almost 36, with Málaga CF, having played only ten competitive matches with the Andalusians in the second division, Schürrer returned to Argentina, serving as a youth coach at Club Atlético Lanús which he also represented as a player in the early 90s.

=== International ===
Schürrer gained four caps for Argentina, his debut coming in 1995. He was picked for the squad at that year's Copa América, as the national team exited in the quarterfinals against Brazil.

== Managerial career ==
In November 2010, Schürrer was appointed head coach of Lanús' first team after the departure of Luis Zubeldía. He left in July 2012.

== Honours ==
Lanús

- Primera Nacional: 1991–92

Deportivo de La Coruña

- La Liga: 1999–2000

Olympiacos F.C.

- Super League Greece: 2004–05, 2005–06
- Greek Football Cup: 2004–05, 2005–06
