= Miguel Amaya =

Miguel Amaya may refer to:

- Miguel Amaya (footballer) (born 1964), Argentine football manager and former player
- Miguel Amaya (baseball) (born 1999), Panamanian baseball player
