= Primera Nacional =

Argentine association football league

- Founded: 1986; 40 years ago
- First season: 1986–87
- Country: Argentina
- Confederation: CONMEBOL
- Number of clubs: 36
- Level on pyramid: 2
- Promotion to: Primera División
- Relegation to: Primera B Metropolitana (Note: Clubs from Buenos Aires (autonoumous city and suburban areas)); Torneo Federal A (Note: Clubs from the rest of the Argentine provinces)
- Current champions: Godoy Cruz (2026)
- Most championships: Banfield; Olimpo (3 titles each)
- Top scorer: Adrián Czornomaz (160)
- Broadcasters: Argentina: TyC Sports; DirecTV Sports International: TNT Sports; TyC Max
- Website: afa.com.ar/primerabnacional
- Current: 2026 Primera Nacional

Primera Nacional, (usually called simply Nacional B, (English "National B Division"), and known as Primera B Nacional until the 2019–20 season) popularly known as La B (The B), is the second division of the Argentine football league system. The competition is made up of 36 teams.

It is played by teams from all over the country. Clubs from Buenos Aires surroundings, as well as some from Santa Fe Province, are promoted from or relegated to the Primera B Metropolitana ("Metropolitan B Division") while for teams from the other provinces the Torneo Federal A ("Federal A Tournament") is the next level down. In Argentine football, Primera Nacional is the second-highest league, and from it, the three best teams are automatically promoted to Primera División.

Primera B Nacional games are often broadcast to Argentina and abroad on television by TyC Sports.

== History ==
It was created in 1986 to integrate unaffiliated clubs into the Argentine football structure, which until then had only participated in Nacional championships of Argentina's First Division tournament. It brought together teams from the old Primera B (until then, the second division) and regional leagues from several Argentine provinces.

After the 1985–86 season, the Primera B Nacional became the second hierarchical league in Argentina's professional football, after the Primera División, and it is above the Torneo Federal A and the Primera B Metropolitana, the last one started to act as a third division for the teams directly affiliated to AFA.

Beginning in the 2019–20 season, the name was changed dropping the B to simply be known as Primera Nacional.

== Format ==
Thirty-six participating teams split into two zones of 18 teams, where they played against the other teams in their group twice: once at home and once away. However, interzonal matches between rival teams were played, although rival sides were still paired together for the season draw and drawn into different zones. Both zone winners played a final match on neutral ground to decide the first promoted team to the top flight for the following season, while the teams placed from second to eighth place in each zone played a knockout tournament (Torneo Reducido) for the second promotion berth along with the loser of the final between the zone winners. Four teams were relegated to the third-tier leagues, those being the bottom two teams from each zone.

== List of champions ==
Since the first season held in 1986–87, the following teams have crowned champions of the division: In case of championships defined by final, they are indicated.

Ed.	Season	Champion	Final score	Runner-up	Third Place
1	1986–87	Deportivo Armenio (1)	– (Note: Championship won on points at the end of the season.)	Banfield	Belgrano (C)
2	1987–88	Deportivo Mandiyú (1)	–	Quilmes	Cipolletti
3	1988–89	Chaco For Ever (1)	–	Lanús	Unión
4	1989–90	Huracán (1)	–	Quilmes	Douglas Haig
5	1990–91	Quilmes (1)	–	Atlético Tucumán	Belgrano (C)
6	1991–92	Lanús (1)	–	Almirante Brown	Colón
7	1992–93	Banfield (1)	0–0 (5–4 p)	Colón	Gimnasia y Tiro
8	1993–94	Gimnasia y Esgrima (J) (1)	–	Quilmes	San Martin (T)
9	1994–95	Estudiantes (LP) (1)	–	Atlético de Rafaela	Colón
10	1995–96	Huracán (C) (1)	2–2, 4–1	Talleres (C)	Atlético Tucumán
11	1996–97	Argentinos Juniors (1)	–	Talleres (C)	Godoy Cruz
12	1997–98	Talleres (C) (1)	1–0, 1–2 (4–3 p)	Belgrano (C)	No third-place awarded
13	1998–99	Instituto (1)	3–0, 0–1	Chacarita Juniors	No third-place awarded
14	1999–00	Huracán (2)	1–0, 1–1	Quilmes	No third-place awarded
15	2000–01	Banfield (2)	2–1, 4–2	Quilmes	No third-place awarded
16	2001–02	Olimpo (1)	–	Quilmes	San Martín (M)
17	2002–03	Atlético de Rafaela (1)	–	Argentinos Juniors	Quilmes
18	2003–04	Instituto (C) (2)	0–1, 2–0	Almagro	Huracán (TA)
19	2004–05	Tiro Federal (1)	1–0, 1–1	Gimnasia y Esgrima (J)	Huracán
20	2005–06	Godoy Cruz (1)	1–1, 3–1 (a.e.t.)	Nueva Chicago	Belgrano (C)
21	2006–07	Olimpo (2)	–	San Martín (SJ)	Huracán
22	2007–08	San Martín (T) (1)	–	Godoy Cruz	Unión
23	2008–09	Atlético Tucumán (1)	–	Chacarita Juniors	Atlético de Rafaela
24	2009–10	Olimpo (3)	–	Quilmes	Atlético de Rafaela
25	2010–11	Atlético de Rafaela (2)	–	Unión	San Martín (SJ)
26	2011–12	River Plate (1)	–	Quilmes	Instituto
27	2012–13	Rosario Central (1)	–	Gimnasia y Esgrima (LP)	Olimpo
28	2013–14	Banfield (3)	–	Defensa y Justicia	Independiente
29	2014	(no champion crowned) (Note: At the end of the season, the 10 best-placed teams were directly promoted to Primera División.)			
30	2015	Atlético Tucumán (2)	–	Patronato	Ferro Carril Oeste
31	2016	Talleres (C) (2)	–	Chacarita Juniors	Gimnasia y Esgrima (J)
32	2016–17	Argentinos Juniors (2)	–	Chacarita Juniors	Guillermo Brown
33	2017–18	Aldosivi (1)	3–1	Almagro	San Martin (T)
34	2018–19	Arsenal (1)	1–0	Sarmiento (J)	Nueva Chicago
35	2019–20	(not completed due to COVID-19 pandemic) (Note: On 28 April 2020, AFA decided to abandon the competition and declare the season finished due to the COVID-19 pandemic with no champion crowned. All official football competitions were suspended on 17 March 2020.)			
36	2020	Sarmiento (J) (1)	1–1 (4–3 p)	Estudiantes (RC)	No third-place awarded
37	2021	Tigre (1)	1–0	Barracas Central	No third-place awarded
38	2022	Belgrano (1)	–	Instituto	San Martín (T)
39	2023	Independiente Rivadavia (1)	2–0 (a.e.t.)	Almirante Brown	No third-place awarded
40	2024	Aldosivi (2)	2–0	San Martín (T)	No third-place awarded
41	2025	Gimnasia y Esgrima (M) (1)	1–1 (3–0 p)	Deportivo Madryn	No third-place awarded
42	2026	Godoy Cruz (2)	3–1	Tristán Suárez	No third-place awarded

== Titles by club ==
Club	Titles	Runn.	Seasons won
Banfield	3	1	1992–93, 2000–01, 2013–14
Olimpo	3	—	2001–02, 2006–07, 2009–10
Talleres (C)	2	2	1997–98, 2016
Atlético Tucumán	2	1	2008–09, 2015
Atlético de Rafaela	2	1	2002–03, 2010–11
Argentinos Juniors	2	1	1996–97, 2016–17
Aldosivi	2	—	2017–18, 2024
Godoy Cruz	2	1	2005–06, 2026
Huracán	2	—	1989–90, 1999–00
Instituto	2	—	1998–99, 2003–04
Deportivo Armenio	1	—	1986–87
Deportivo Mandiyú	1	—	1987–88
Chaco For Ever	1	—	1988–89
Quilmes	1	8	1990–91
Lanús	1	1	1991–92
Gimnasia y Esgrima (J)	1	1	1993–94
Estudiantes (LP)	1	—	1994–95
Huracán (C)	1	—	1995–96
Tiro Federal	1	—	2004–05
San Martín (T)	1	1	2007–08
River Plate	1	—	2011–12
Rosario Central	1	—	2012–13
Arsenal	1	1	2018–19
Sarmiento (J)	1	1	2020
Tigre	1	—	2021
Belgrano	1	1	2022
Independiente Rivadavia	1	—	2023
Gimnasia y Esgrima (M)	1	—	2025

== Seasons in Primera Nacional ==
Notes

- Updated to 2026 season.
- Teams in **bold** are currently playing in the division.

Club/s	Seasons
Instituto	31
**Atlético de Rafaela**	30
**Quilmes**	29
**Chacarita Juniors**, **Gimnasia y Esgrima (J)**, **Nueva Chicago**	27
**Ferro Carril Oeste**	26
**San Martín (SJ)**, **San Martín (T)**	25
Defensa y Justicia	24
**All Boys**, **Almagro**	23
**Almirante Brown**, Atlético Tucumán	22
Independiente Rivadavia, **Los Andes**	21
**Deportivo Morón**	20
Belgrano (C), Douglas Haig	19
Aldosivi	17
Unión (SF), Tigre	15
**Atlanta**, **Godoy Cruz**, **Temperley**, Villa Dálmine	14
Arsenal, **Chaco For Ever**, **Colón**, **Defensores de Belgrano**, Huracán	13
Banfield, **Deportivo Maipú**, **Estudiantes (BA)**, Guillermo Brown, Olimpo	12
Brown (A), Central Córdoba (R), **Racing (C)**, Sportivo Italiano, Talleres (C)	11
**Agropecuario**, Boca Unidos, Central Córdoba (SdE), Cipolletti, **Mitre (SdE)**, **Patronato**, Platense, Santamarina, Sarmiento (J)	10
Comisión de Actividades Infantiles, Gimnasia y Esgrima (M), **Gimnasia y Tiro**, Juventud Antoniana, San Martín (M), Talleres (RE)	9
El Porvenir	8
Alvarado, Estudiantes (RC), Gimnasia y Esgrima (CdU), **San Miguel**, Tiro Federal (R)	7
Almirante Brown (A), Deportivo Riestra, **Güemes (SdE)**, **San Telmo**, **Tristán Suárez**	6
Argentinos Juniors, Crucero del Norte, **Deportivo Madryn**, Huracán (TA), Laferrere, Lanús,	5
Deportivo Merlo, Estudiantes (SL), Flandria, Guaraní Antonio Franco, Juventud Unida (G), Villa Mitre	4
Atlético Paraná, Barracas Central, Ben Hur, **Central Norte**, Defensores Unidos, Deportivo Español, Huracán Corrientes, Rosario Central, Sportivo Belgrano	3
Deportivo Armenio, **Colegiales**, Deportivo Mandiyú, Ferro Carril Oeste (GP), Gimnasia y Esgrima (LP), Ituzaingó	2
**Acassuso**, Atlético Concepción, Argentino (R), **Ciudad de Bolívar**, Desamparados, Estación Quequén, Estudiantes (LP), **Ferrocarril Midland**, General Paz Juniors, Independiente, Juventud Unida Universitario, River Plate, Sacachispas, Unión (MdP), Unión de Villa Krause, Villa San Carlos	1

== Top scorers ==
Season	Player	Team	Goals
1986–87	(Argentina) José Raúl Iglesias	Huracán	36
1987–88	(Argentina) Daniel Leani	Quilmes	24
1988–89	(Argentina) Daniel Aquino	Banfield	24
1988–89	(Argentina) Sergio Recchiutti	Almirante Brown	24
1989–90	(Argentina) Juan Almada	Defensa y Justicia	20
1989–90	(Argentina) Abel Blasón	Quilmes	20
1990–91	(Argentina) Roberto Oste	Defensa y Justicia	24
1991–92	(Argentina) Carlos Cardozo	Almirante Brown	26
1992–93	(Argentina) Miguel Amaya	Gimnasia y Tiro (S)	21
1993–94	(Argentina) Dante Fernández	Quilmes	29
1994–95	(Argentina) Alejandro Abaurre	Godoy Cruz	29
1995–96	(Argentina) Adrián Czornomaz	Los Andes	22
1996–97	(Honduras) Eduardo Bennett	Argentinos Juniors	23
1997–98	(Argentina) Alejandro Glaría	Banfield	30
1998–99	(Argentina) Adrián Czornomaz	Atlético Tucumán	26
1999–00	(Argentina) Gastón Casas	Huracán	30
2000–01	(Argentina) Daniel Jiménez	Instituto	23
2001–02	(Argentina) Diego Ceballos	Gimnasia y Esgrima (CdU)	26
2002–03	(Argentina) Daniel Giménez	Godoy Cruz	13
2002–03	(Argentina) Diego Torres	Quilmes	13
2003–04	(Argentina) Julio Bevacqua	Comisión de Actividades Infantiles	13
2004–05	(Argentina) Rubén Ramírez	Tiro Federal	15
2005–06	(Argentina) Daniel Bazán Vera	Unión (SF)	18
2006–07	(Argentina) Ismael Blanco	Olimpo	29
2007–08	(Argentina) Cristian Milla	Chacarita Juniors	20
2007–08	(Argentina) Leandro Zárate	Unión	20
2008–09	(Argentina) Luis Rodríguez	Atlético Tucumán	20
2009–10	(Argentina) Leandro Armani	Tiro Federal	19
2010–11	(Argentina) César Carignano	Atlético de Rafaela	21
2011–12	(Argentina) Gonzalo Castillejos	Rosario Central	26
2012–13	(Argentina) Luis Rodríguez	Atlético Tucumán	20
2013–14	(Argentina) Juan M. Lucero	Defensa y Justicia	24
2014	(Argentina) Ramón Ábila	Huracán	9
2014	(Argentina) Nicolás Mazzola	Instituto (C)	9
2015	(Argentina) Fernando Zampedri	Juventud Unida (G)	25
2016	(Argentina) Germán Lesman	All Boys	17
2016–17	(Argentina) Rodrigo Salinas	Chacarita Juniors	30
2017–18	(Argentina) Jonathan Herrera	Deportivo Riestra / Ferro Carril Oeste	13
2018–19	(Argentina) Patricio Cucchi	Gimnasia y Esgrima (M)	15
2019–20	(Argentina) Pablo Magnín	Sarmiento (J)	15
2020	(Ecuador) Claudio Bieler	Atlético Rafaela	5
2021	(Argentina) Pablo Magnín	Tigre	22
2022	(Argentina) Pablo Vegetti	Belgrano (C)	17
2023	(Paraguay) Álex Arce	Independiente Rivadavia	25
2024	(Argentina) Agustín Lavezzi	Tristán Suárez	18
2025	(Argentina) Alejandro Gagliardi	Agropecuario	18
