= Celso Capdevila =

Paraguayan footballer (born 1984)

Personal information
- Date of birth: March 14, 1984 (age 42)
- Place of birth: Mariano Roque Alonso, Paraguay
- Height: 1.91 m (6 ft 3 in)
- Position: Goalkeeper

Senior career*
Years	Team	Apps	(Gls)
2006-2008	2 de Mayo	13	(0)
2008-2010	12 de Octubre		
2010	Sportivo Italiano		
2011	12 de Octubre		
2011-2012	Sportivo Italiano		
2018	Sportivo Iteño	3	(0)
- * Club domestic league appearances and goals

Celso Capdevila (born March 14, 1984, in Mariano Roque Alonso, Paraguay) is a Paraguayan association football goalkeeper currently playing for Sportivo Italiano of the Primera B Metropolitana in Argentina.

== Teams ==
- (Paraguay) 2 de Mayo 2006-2008
- (Paraguay) 12 de Octubre 2008-2010
- (Argentina) Sportivo Italiano 2010
- (Paraguay) 12 de Octubre 2011
- (Argentina) Sportivo Italiano 2011–2012
- (Paraguay) Sportivo Iteño 2018
