= Ivar Stafuza =

Argentine footballer

Personal information
- Full name: Ivar Gerardo Stafuza
- Date of birth: 6 November 1961 (age 64)
- Place of birth: Reconquista, Argentina
- Positions: Defender; midfielder

Senior career*
| Years | Team | Apps | (Gls) |
| 1982–1991 | Boca Juniors | 197 | (6) |
| 1992–1993 | Club Atlético Banfield | 28 | (9) |
- Guaraní Antonio Franco
| 1995–1996 | Talleres de Remedios de Escalada | | |
| 1996–1997 | Club Sportivo General San Martín | | |
- * Club domestic league appearances and goals

Ivar Stafuza (born 6 November 1961) is an Argentinean retired footballer.
