= Deportivo Mandiyú =

Argentine football club (founded 1952)

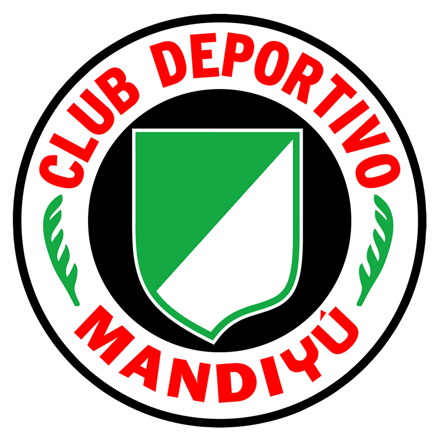
- Full name: Club Deportivo Mandiyú
- Nicknames: Algo; Algodonero
- Founded: 14 December 1952; 73 years ago
- Ground: José A. Romero Feris, Corrientes, Argentina
- Capacity: 15,700
- Chairman: Julio Carlino
- Coach: Héctor Ponce
- League: Liga Correntina de Fútbol
- 2021–22: Champion of Liga Correntina de Fútbol
- Website: www.deportivomandiyu.com.ar
Home colours	Away colours

Club Deportivo Mandiyú, also referred as Mandiyú is an Argentine football club, based in Corrientes, in the Province of the same name. The squad currently plays in the regionalised fourth tier of Argentine football league system, the Torneo Regional Federal Amateur.

== History ==
=== Foundation and regional success ===
The club was founded under the name "Club Deportivo Tipoiti" on December 14, 1952, by a group of textile workers from the Tipoiti textile factory in Corrientes, Argentina. Because the Argentine Football Association did not accept commercial company names, the club had to change its name to "Club Deportivo Mandiyú", which means cotton in the indigenous language of Guaraní.

=== The club at its peak ===
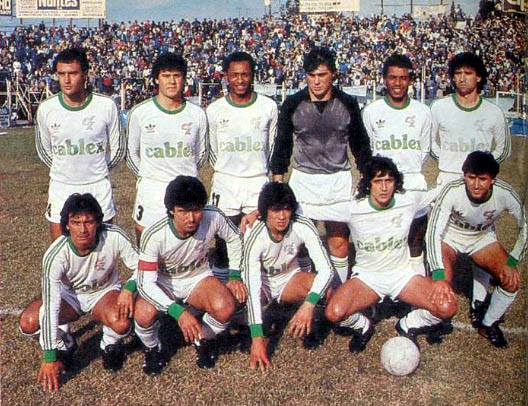
Team of Mandiyú that won the Primera B Nacional title in 1988

After becoming the most successful team of Liga Correntina, Mandiyú started its professional career in 1985 entering the Primera B Nacional. The squad won the 1987–88 championship therefore promoting to Primera División after a 0–0 tie to Quilmes, just one fixture before the end of the tournament. Mandiyú was coached by Juan Manuel Guerra. Some of its most notable players were Adolfino Cañete, José Basualdo and Pedro Barrios.

In 1988 Mandiyú nearly qualified to Copa Libertadores playing a mini-tournament with San Lorenzo de Almagro. Both matches finished 1–1 but San Lorenzo passed to the next stage due to its best position in the Primera División tournament.

Mandiyú achieved some notable performances during its third tenure on the Argentine top division, with notable victories over Boca Juniors (2–1), Independiente (3–0), Racing (4–3) and San Lorenzo (3–2). Forwards Félix Torres and José Blanchart scored 13 goals each. The best campaign in Primera ever was in the 1991 Clausura, where Mandiyú finished 3rd to Boca Juniors and San Lorenzo. Although Mandiyú did not get tremendous results, it ranked 2nd among the teams with less goals received during the tournament. Due to there was no limits to hire foreign players by then, Mandiyú had many Paraguayan and Uruguayan players.

Mandiyú finished 6th in the 1991 Apertura, only 4 points to champion River Plate. The next season (1992 Clausura), the squad made a poor campaign, finishing 18th.

=== Demise ===
In 1993, then Mandiyú chairman Eduardo Seferian tried the club to become a S.A. as a way to solve the serious economic problems of the institution. In 1994 he sold the club to a member of Argentine Parliament Roberto Cruz and San Lorenzo leading Roberto Navarro for the amount of U$S 2 million. Mandiyú keep Guido Alvarenga as a part of the team, hired Diego Maradona as coach, and also bring the international goalkeeper Sergio Goycochea.

The project was wrong, Mandiyú did a disappointing campaign in 1995 Clausura being relegated to the second division. Finally, the group that managed Mandiyú sold the club to Romero Ferix for the price of $1. Romero Ferix decided that huracán de Corrientes plays the second league instead of Mandiyú because Huracán de Corrientes already has a stadium, Mandiyú was disaffiliated from the Liga Correntina.

Huracán Corrientes filled the vacant place left by Mandiyú, promoting to Primera División after winning the Nacional B championship. In 1998, a group of former managers and fans of Mandiyú decided to form a new club, originally named "Deportivo Textil". The word "Mandiyú" was added later, with the intention of keeping the soul of the original club.

=== Return ===
In 2010, the club was allowed to participate in the Liga Correntina again. On May 8, 2011, Deportivo Mandiyú made its debut in the second division of the league, defeating Nueva Valencia by 3–0. On August 22, Mandiyú promoted to the top division of Correntino league, remaining undefeated along the tournament.

Deportivo Mandiyú is currently playing the Torneo Argentino B, which arrived after being invited by the Consejo Federal de Fútbol, along with its relative club Textil Mandiyú.

== Honours ==
=== National ===
- Primera B Nacional
  - Winners (1): 1987–88
- Torneo del Interior
  - Winners (1): 1986

=== Regional ===
- Liga Correntina
  - Winners (13): 1958, 1960, 1963, 1973, 1976, 1979, 1980, 1982, 1985, 1990, 1992, 2002, 2021
