= Luis Escobedo =

Argentina footballer

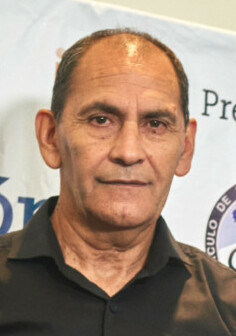

Personal information
- Date of birth: 3 September 1962 (age 63)
- Place of birth: Santiago del Estero, Argentina
- Position: Midfielder

Senior career*
Years	Team	Apps	(Gls)
1982	Los Andes		
1983–1985	Atlético Belgrano		
1986–1987	Los Andes		
1988–1989	Colón de Santa Fe	49	(2)
1990–1991	Santiago Wanderers		
1992–1993	Vélez Sarsfield		
1994–1995	Belgrano de Córdoba	2	(0)
1996–1998	Temperley	52	(0)
1999–2000	Sportivo Dock Sud	26	(1)
- * Club domestic league appearances and goals

Luis Alberto Escobedo (born 3 September 1962) is an Argentine former professional footballer who played as a midfielder for clubs of Argentina and Chile.

== Career ==
- Los Andes 1982
- Belgrano de Córdoba 1983–1985
- Los Andes 1986–1987
- Colón de Santa Fe 1988–1989
- Santiago Wanderers 1990–1991
- Vélez Sársfield 1992–1993
- Belgrano de Córdoba 1994–1995
- Temperley 1996–1999
- Sportivo Dock Sud 1999–2000
