= Hernán Meske =

Argentine footballer (born 1969)

Personal information
- Full name: Hernán Carlos Meske
- Date of birth: 13 February 1969 (age 57)
- Place of birth: Buenos Aires, Argentina
- Position: Defender

Youth career
- Lanús

Senior career*
Years	Team	Apps	(Gls)
1989–1993	Lanús	41	(0)
1993–1998	Deportivo Español	137	(0)
1998–1999	Quilmes	31	(1)
1999–2000	Unión Central		
2000–2001	Estudiantes BA	20	(1)
Total		229	(2)

Managerial career
- 2006–2007: El Linqueño
- 2007–2009: Talleres (RE)
- 2009–2018: Lanús (youth)
- 2020–2021: Blooming (reserves)
- 2021: Blooming
- * Club domestic league appearances and goals

Hernán Carlos Meske (born 13 February 1969) is an Argentine football manager and former player who played as a defender.

== Career ==
A Lanús youth graduate, Meske played for four seasons with the first team, being a part of the squad in their first-ever promotion to the Argentine Primera División. In 1993, he moved to Deportivo Español also in the top tier, being a regular starter during his five-year spell at the club.

Meske joined Quilmes in 1998, and also had a one-year stint at Bolivian side Unión Central before returning to Argentina in 2000, with Estudiantes de Buenos Aires. He retired with the side in the following year, aged 32.

After retiring, Meske was named manager of hometown side El Linqueño in 2006. In the following year, he took over Talleres de Remedios de Escalada, and subsequently worked at his first club Lanús' youth categories.

In 2020, Meske returned to Bolivia after being named general coordinator and manager of the reserve team of Blooming. On 19 August 2021, he was appointed interim manager of the main squad after Eduardo Villegas was sacked, and was definitely appointed manager until the end of the season on 7 September.
