= Miguel Amaya (footballer) =

Argentine footballer (born 1964)

Personal information
- Full name: Miguel Alberto Amaya
- Date of birth: November 23, 1964 (age 61)
- Place of birth: Tucumán Province, Argentina

Senior career*
Years	Team	Apps	(Gls)
1986–1987	Atlético Concepción	3	(0)
1988–1989	Jorge Wilstermann		
1990–1991	The Strongest		
1991–1992	Talleres de Perico		
1992–1995	Gimnasia y Tiro de Salta	110	(49)
1995–1996	Huracán Corrientes	18	(2)
1996	Deportes Temuco	14	(2)
1997	Club Atlético Belgrano	17	(1)
1997–2000	San Martín de Tucumán	95	(36)
2001–2002	13 de Junio de Pirané		
2002–2003	Talleres de Perico	4	(0)
Medal record
Second place	Copa Bolivia	1989
First place	Primera Nacional	1996
- * Club domestic league appearances and goals

Miguel Alberto Amaya (born November 23, 1964) is a former Argentine footballer, who played for clubs from Argentina, Chile, and Bolivia.
