= Chaco For Ever =

Argentine football club

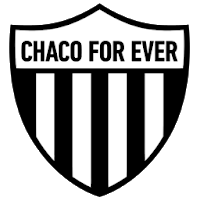
- Full name: Club Atlético Chaco For Ever
- Nickname: El Negro
- Founded: 27 July 1913; 113 years ago
- Ground: Estadio Juan Alberto García, Resistencia, Argentina
- Capacity: 23,000
- Chairman: Hector Gómez
- Manager: Ricardo Pancaldo
- League: Primera Nacional
- 2025: Primera Nacional Zone B, 8th of 18
- Website: https://chacoforever.club/
Home colours	Away colours	Third colours

Club Atlético Chaco For Ever, usually just Chaco For Ever, is an Argentine football club, their home town is Resistencia, in the Province of Chaco in Northern Argentina. They currently play in the Primera Nacional, the second tier of Argentine football.

== History ==
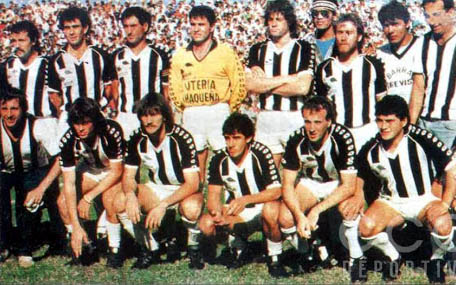
The 1989 team that won the Primera B Nacional title

Chaco For Ever was founded in 1913. The use of an English phrase was common to clubs in Argentina at the turn of the 20th century but the term ‘Chaco For Ever’ is unique. It is thought that the club founder felt that such a name would guarantee a prosperous future and, in short, make it a club ‘forever’. The colours the club chose to wear as their identity represented the local economy at the time: white for cotton and black for coal.

The club has had two seasons at the top level (Primera División), in 1989–90 and 1990–91. The 1989–90 season was the most successful in their history, as they finished 17th, and won the relegation playoff against Racing de Córdoba 5–0 to retain their place in the Primera División. The next season, the Primera was divided into two tournaments, the Apertura and Clausura. Chaco For Ever finished 16th and 19th, condemning them to relegation with a points per game average of only 0.789.

The team has also played seven seasons at the 2nd level (Primera B Nacional).

== People associated with the club ==
After Chaco For Ever lost a relegation match in Rafaela in 1998, Ante Garmaz, an actor, fashion designer and former model who grew up in Las Breñas, decided to help the players by financially supporting their accommodation in Rafaela and paying for their trips back to Chaco. Garmaz subsequently joined the club as part of the administration personnel.

== Honours ==
=== National ===
- Primera B Nacional
  - Winners (1): 1988-89

== See also ==
- List of football clubs in Argentina
- Argentine football league system
