= List of regional football leagues in Argentina =

The following is a list of regional football leagues in Argentina sorted by province.

== Buenos Aires ==
- Liga Albertina de fútbol
- Liga Alvearense de fútbol (Buenos Aires)
- Liga Amateur de Deportes (Lincoln)
- Liga Amateur Platense de fútbol
- Liga Ameghinese de fútbol
- Liga Ayacuchense de fútbol
- Liga Balcarceña de fútbol
- Liga Bragadense de fútbol
- Liga Campanense de fútbol
- Liga Carhuense de fútbol
- Liga Casarense de fútbol
- Liga Chascomunense de fútbol
- Liga Chivilcoyana de fútbol
- Liga Cultural Deportiva (Tres Lomas)
- Liga de fútbol (Roque Pérez)
- Liga de fútbol de Arrecifes
- Liga de fútbol de Azul
- Liga de fútbol de Baradero
- Liga de fútbol de Coronel Dorrego
- Liga de fútbol de General Alvarado
- Liga de fútbol de General Villegas
- Liga de fútbol de Las Flores
- Liga de fútbol de Mar Chiquita
- Liga de fútbol de Olavarría
- Liga de fútbol de Salto
- Liga de fútbol de Villarino
- Liga de fútbol del Oeste (América/Rivadavia)
- Liga de fútbol del Partido de la Costa
- Liga de fútbol Las Sierras
- Liga de fútbol Pergamino
- Liga del Sur (Bahía Blanca)
- Liga Deportiva Carmen de Areco
- Liga Deportiva Central (Leandro N. Alem)
- Liga Deportiva de Bolívar
- Liga Deportiva de Cañuelas
- Liga Deportiva de Chacabuco
- Liga Deportiva de Colón
- Liga Deportiva de fútbol (Rojas)
- Liga Deportiva de General Arenales
- Liga Deportiva de Saladillo
- Liga Deportiva de San Antonio de Areco
- Liga Deportiva del Oeste (Junín)
- Liga Deportiva del Sur
- Liga Deportiva Puanense
- Liga Deportiva Sampedrina
- Liga Dolorense de fútbol (Buenos Aires)
- Liga Escobarense de Fútbol
- Liga Guaminense de fútbol
- Liga Juarense de fútbol
- Liga Lapridense de fútbol
- Liga Lobense de fútbol
- Liga Loberense de fútbol
- Liga Lujanense de fútbol
- Liga Madariaguense de fútbol
- Liga Maipuense de fútbol
- Liga Marplatense de fútbol
- Liga Mercedina de fútbol
- Liga Montense de fútbol
- Liga Necochense de fútbol
- Liga Nicoleña de fútbol
- Liga Nuevejuliense de fútbol
- Liga Pehuajense de fútbol
- Liga Pringles de fútbol
- Liga Rauchense de fútbol
- Liga Regional de fútbol (Coronel Suárez)
- Liga Regional Tresarroyense de fútbol
- Liga Tandilense de fútbol
- Liga Toldense de fútbol
- Liga Trenquelauquense de fútbol
- Liga Veinticinqueña de fútbol
- Liga Zarateña de fútbol

== Catamarca ==
- Liga Andalgalense de fútbol
- Liga Belenista de fútbol
- Liga Catamarqueña de fútbol
- Liga Chacarera de fútbol (Valle Viejo)
- Liga Departamental de fútbol de Pomán
- Liga Departamental de fútbol de Recreo
- Liga Fiambalense de fútbol
- Liga Santamariana de fútbol
- Liga Tinogasteña de fútbol

== Chaco ==
- Asociación de fútbol del Oeste Chaqueño (Villa Ángela)
- Liga Chaqueña de fútbol
- Liga de fútbol del Noroeste Chaqueño (Las Breñas)
- Liga de fútbol del Norte (General José de San Martín)
- Liga Deportiva y Cultural Las Palmas
- Liga Quitilipense de fútbol
- Liga Regional de fútbol (Machagai)
- Liga Saenzpeñense de fútbol

== Chubut ==
- Liga de fútbol de Comodoro Rivadavia
- Liga de fútbol del Oeste del Chubut (Esquel)
- Liga de fútbol Valle del Chubut (Trelew)

== Córdoba ==
- Liga Bellvillense de fútbol
- Liga Cordobesa de fútbol
- Liga Cruzdelejeña de fútbol
- Liga Regional de Fútbol General Roca
- Liga Departamental de fútbol de Punilla
- Liga Departamental Santa María
- Liga Dolorense de fútbol (Córdoba)
- Liga Independiente de Fútbol (Oncativo)
- Liga Ischilín de fútbol
- Liga Regional de Colón
- Liga Regional de fútbol de Canals
- Liga Regional de fútbol de Laboulaye
- Liga Regional de fútbol de Río Cuarto
- Liga Regional de fútbol de San Francisco
- Liga Regional de fútbol del Sur (Corral de Bustos)
- Liga Regional de fútbol Dr. Adrián Beccar Varela
- Liga Regional de fútbol San Alberto
- Liga Regional Riotercerense de fútbol
- Liga Villamariense de fútbol

== Corrientes ==
- Liga Bellavistense de fútbol
- Liga Correntina de fútbol
- Liga de fútbol General Belgrano
- Liga Deportiva Casereña General San Martín
- Liga Esquinense de fútbol
- Liga Goyana de fútbol
- Liga Ituzaingueña de fútbol
- Liga Libreña de fútbol
- Liga Mercedeña de fútbol
- Liga Santomeña de fútbol
- Liga Virasoreña de fútbol

== Entre Ríos ==
- Liga Concordiense de fútbol
- Liga de fútbol de Chajarí
- Liga de fútbol de Concepción del Uruguay
- Liga de fútbol de Paraná Campaña
- Liga Departamental de fútbol (Rosario del Tala)
- Liga Departamental de fútbol de Colón
- Liga Departamental de fútbol de Gualeguay
- Liga Departamental de fútbol de Gualeguaychú
- Liga Departamental de fútbol de Nogoyá
- Liga Diamantina de fútbol
- Liga Federalense de fútbol
- Liga Felicianense de fútbol
- Liga Paceña de fútbol
- Liga Paranaense de fútbol
- Liga Regional de fútbol
- Liga Santaelenense de fútbol
- Liga Victoriense de fútbol
- Liga Villaguayense de fútbol
- Liga Zonal de fútbol (Caseros)

== Formosa ==
- Liga Clorindense de fútbol
- Liga de fútbol de Laguna Blanca
- Liga de fútbol del Centro (Ibarreta)
- Liga de fútbol del Sur (El Colorado)
- Liga Formoseña de fútbol
- Liga Piranense de fútbol

== Jujuy ==
- Liga Departamental de fútbol del Carmen
- Liga Jujeña de Fútbol
- Liga Regional Jujeña de fútbol (Libertador Gral. San Martín)

== La Pampa ==
- Liga Cultural de fútbol
- Liga Pampeana de fútbol (General Pico)

== La Rioja ==
- Liga Aimogasteña de fútbol
- Liga Chileciteña de fútbol
- Liga Cultural y Deportiva Los Llanos
- Liga de fútbol del Sur Riojano
- Liga Riojana de fútbol

== Mendoza ==
- Liga Alvearense de fútbol (Mendoza)
- Liga de fútbol de Tunuyán
- Liga Malargüina de fútbol
- Liga Mendocina de fútbol
- Liga Rivadaviense de fútbol
- Liga Sancarlina de fútbol
- Liga Sanrafaelina de fútbol
- Liga Tupungatina de fútbol

== Misiones ==
- Liga Apostoleña de fútbol
- Liga de fútbol de Eldorado
- Liga Posadeña de fútbol
- Liga Regional de fútbol de Iguazú
- Liga Regional de fútbol de Puerto Rico
- Liga Regional Obereña de fútbol

== Neuquén ==
- Liga de fútbol del Neuquén

== Río Negro ==
- Liga de fútbol de Bariloche
- Liga de fútbol de Río Colorado
- Liga Deportiva Confluencia
- Liga Regional Atlántica de fútbol
- Liga Regional de fútbol Avellaneda
- Liga Rionegrina de fútbol

== Salta ==
- Liga Anteña de fútbol
- Liga Calchaquí de fútbol
- Liga de fútbol de Rosario de la Frontera
- Liga de fútbol de Vespucio
- Liga Regional de fútbol del Bermejo
- Liga de fútbol del Valle de Lerma
- Liga Departamental de fútbol Gral. San Martín
- Liga Güemense de fútbol
- Liga Metanense de fútbol
- Liga Salteña de fútbol

== San Juan ==
- Liga Calingasteña de fútbol
- Liga Caucetera de fútbol
- Liga de fútbol de Albardón Angaco
- Liga Iglesiana de fútbol
- Liga Jachallera de fútbol
- Liga Sanjuanina de fútbol
- Liga Sarmientina de fútbol
- Liga Veinticinqueña de fútbol

== San Luis ==
- Liga Daractense de fútbol
- Liga de fútbol de Mercedes
- Liga de fútbol del Norte Puntano
- Liga Sanluiseña de fútbol
- Liga Valle del Conlara

== Santa Cruz ==
- Liga de fútbol Centro (Com.L.Piedra Buena)
- Liga de fútbol Sur (Río Gallegos)
- Liga de fútbol Norte de Santa Cruz

== Santa Fe ==
- Asociación Rosarina de Fútbol
- Liga Cañadense de fútbol
- Liga Casildense de fútbol
- Liga Ceresina de fútbol
- Liga Esperancina de fútbol
- Liga de fútbol Regional del Sud (Villa Constitución)
- Liga Departamental de fútbol San Martín
- Liga Deportiva del Sur (Alcorta)
- Liga Galvense de fútbol
- Liga Interprovincial de fútbol (Chañar Ladeado)
- Liga Ocampense de fútbol
- Liga Rafaelina de fútbol
- Liga Reconquistense fútbol
- Liga Regional Sanlorencina de fútbol
- Liga Regional Totorense de fútbol
- Liga Sancristobalense de fútbol
- Liga Santafesina de Fútbol
- Liga Venadense de fútbol
- Liga Verense de fútbol

== Santiago del Estero ==
- Liga Añatuyense de fútbol
- Liga Cultural de fútbol de Frías
- Liga Santiagueña de Fútbol
- Liga Termense de fútbol

== Tierra del Fuego, Antártida e Islas del Atlántico Sur ==
- Liga Oficial de fútbol Río Grande
- Liga Ushuaiense de Fútbol

== Tucumán ==
- Liga Tucumana de Fútbol
