= Estadio Centenario Ciudad de Quilmes =

Football stadium in Quilmes, Argentina

Centennial Stadium
- Estadio Centenario
- Estadio Ciudad de Quilmes

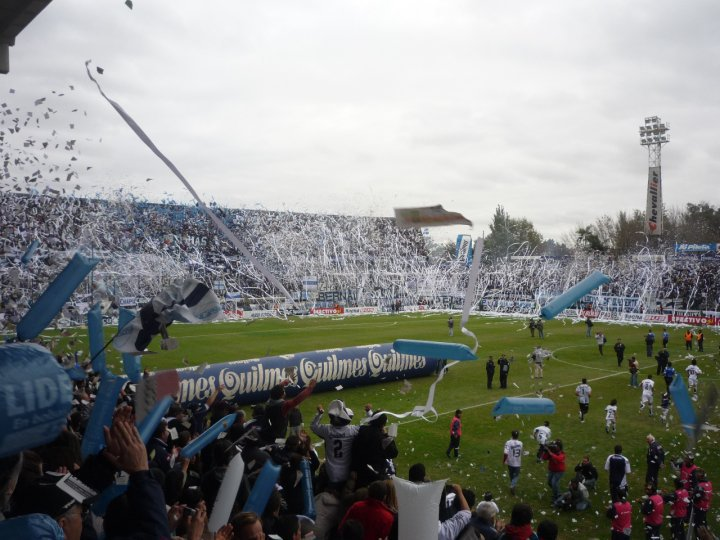
- Estadio Centenario during a match in 2010
- Interactive map of Centennial Stadium
- Full name: Estadio Centenario Ciudad de Quilmes
- Address: Vicente López y Esquiú; Quilmes; Argentina
- Coordinates: 34°44′30″S 58°15′07″W
- Owner: Quilmes A.C.
- Operator: Quilmes A.C.
- Capacity: 30,200
- Type: Stadium
- Event: Sporting events
- Surface: Grass
- Field size: 105 x 66 m

Construction
- Opened: April 25, 1995; 31 years ago
- Expanded: 1998
- Architect: Iván Urbán

Tenant
- Quilmes (1995–present)

Website
- quilmesaclub.org.ar/estadio

Estadio Centenario Ciudad de Quilmes is a football stadium located in Quilmes, Argentina. The stadium, owned and managed by Quilmes Atlético Club, has a capacity of 30,200 people and was inaugurated in 1995. replacing the first Quilmes A.C. venue, Estadio Guido y Sarmiento.

The Estadio Centenario was named in commemoration of the 100th. anniversary of Quilmes A.C., which sets its year of foundation in 1887.

== History ==
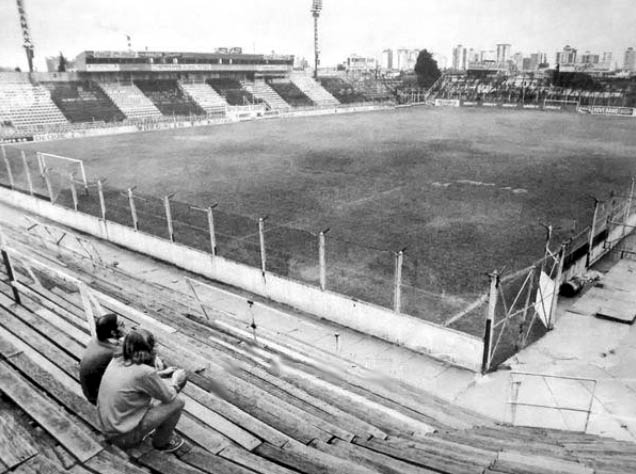
Estadio "Guido y Sarmiento", predecessor of Estadio Centenario, operated from 1898 to 1995

The club announced the construction of a new stadium in November 1987, in commemoration of the 100th anniversary of the institution. Proyect was directed by architect Iván Urbán (also a Quilmes supporter) and works began one year later. The stadium was partially opened in 1993 with a friendly match between "Quilmes Campeón" (a combined with former players of the 1978 Primera División champion team) and an all-time stars combined team.

The venue was officially inaugurated on April 25, 1995, with the name "Estadio Centenario 'José Luis Meiszner'". Meizner was then the president of Quilmes. Celebrations included a match between Quilmes and Uruguayan club Nacional, won by Quilmes 2–1.

On June 30, 1995, the Argentina national football team played for the first time in Estadio Centenario v. Australia, winning 2–0 with goals scored by Abel Balbo and Gabriel Batistuta. The stadium was refurbished and later re-opened in November 1998.

The old Quilmes stadium located on Guido and Sarmiento streets (behind the club's headquarters) was demolished. The stadium has been used by other teams such as Estudiantes de La Plata in the 2010 Apertura championship, which also won coached by Alejandro Sabella.

In 2016, the club (led by new president Marcelo Callelo) changed the name of the stadium to "Estadio Centenario Ciudad de Quilmes", removing the name of the former president after he was involved in the 2015 FIFA corruption case. Meiszner had managed the club for over 30 years, apart from being a close collaborator of Julio Grondona in the Argentine Football Association.

What we want to do is to change the image of the club (...) We didn't want to see it being associated to mafia or illicit acts. Thus, changing the stadium name was an important step for that purpose.

— Jairo Gomelsky, secretary of communications of Quilmes A.C.

== See also ==
- List of football stadiums in Argentina
- Lists of stadiums
