= Florencio Varela, Buenos Aires =

City in Buenos Aires Province, Argentina

Florencio Varela
- City
- San Juan Bautista
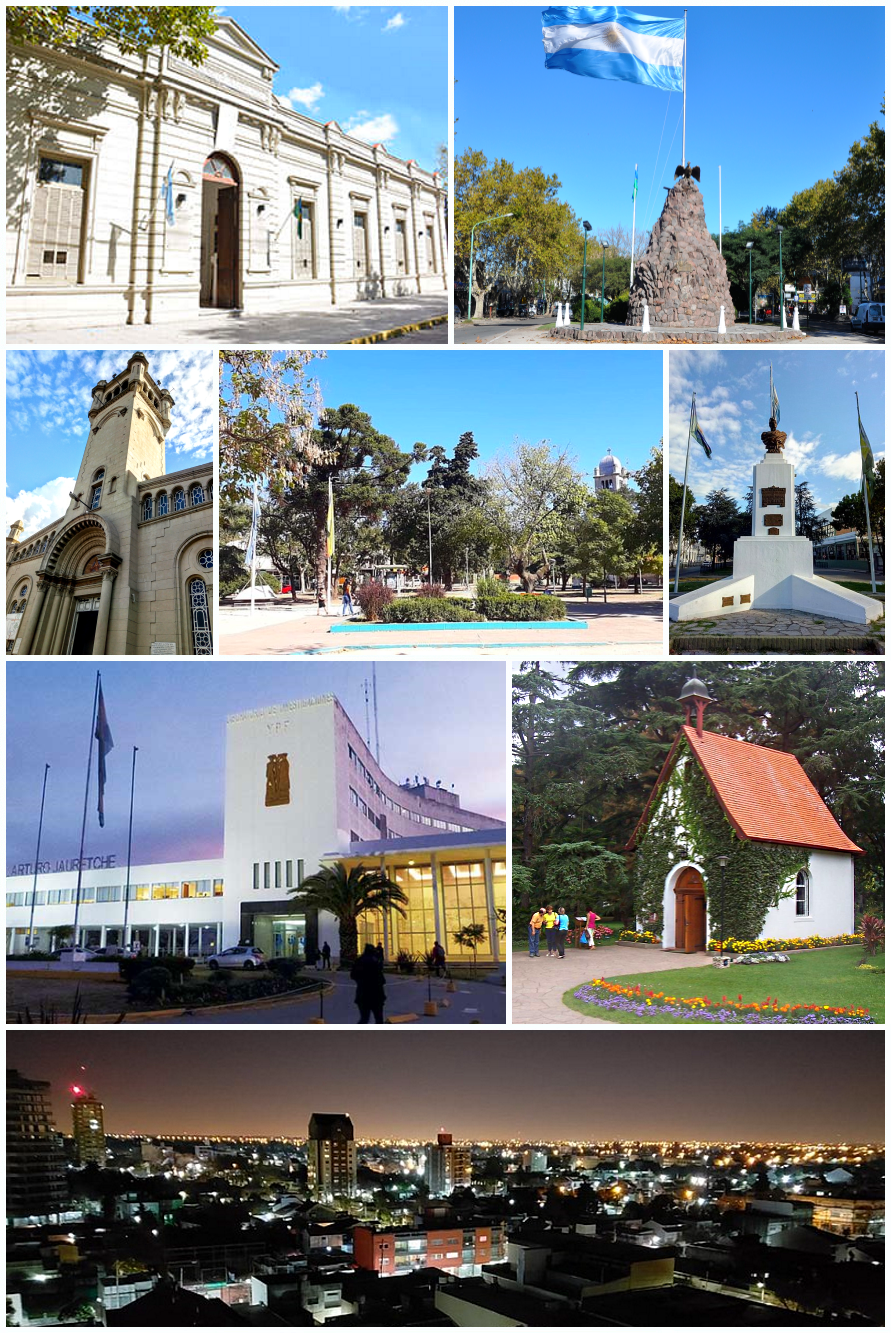
- Former town hall, actual museum. Flag Monument (Bicho Canasto). San Juan Bautista Church. San Juan Bautista square. General San Martín on the avenue of the same name. Arturo Jauretche Nacional University main building. Schönstatt Sanctuary. Nocturn view of down town.

- Location in Greater Buenos Aires
- Coordinates: 34°49′S 58°17′W
- Country: Argentina
- Province: Buenos Aires
- Partido: Florencio Varela
- Founded: January 30, 1891
- Elevation: 125 m (410 ft)

Population (2010 census [INDEC])
  - Total: 131,841
- CPA Base: B 1888
- Area code: +54 11

Florencio Varela, officially named San Juan Bautista, is a city in Buenos Aires Province, Argentina. It is the administrative centre for Florencio Varela Partido. It forms part of the urban agglomeration of Greater Buenos Aires.

The settlement was officially founded on 30 January 1891 by Juan de la Cruz Contreras. It is named after Argentine writer and journalist Florencio Varela.
