= Talleres de Remedios de Escalada =

Talleres (RE)
- Full name: Club Atlético Talleres
- Nicknames: Los Tallarines (The Noodles); El Albirrojo (The white & red)
- Founded: 1 June 1906; 120 years ago
- Ground: Estadio Pablo Comelli, Remedios de Escalada, Argentina
- Capacity: 18,000
- Chairman: Osvaldo Fernández
- Manager: Martín Rolón
- League: Primera B
- 2025: Primera Nacional Zone B, 17th of 18 (relegated)
- Website: talleres.org.ar
Home colours	Away colours	Third colours

Club Atlético Talleres, usually called Talleres de Remedios de Escalada, is an Argentine sports club sited in the Remedios de Escalada district of Lanús Partido, Greater Buenos Aires. The club is mostly known for its football team, which currently plays in the Primera B Metropolitana, the third division of the Argentine football league system. The club also has a women's football section.

Apart from football, a wide range of sports are practised at the club, some of them are artistic gymnastics, basketball, boxing, field hockey, futsal, handball, roller skating, taekwondo, tennis, volleyball, and yoga.

== History ==
The club was founded on 1 June 1906 with the name "Talleres United Football Club", being formed by the joining of two teams, Los Talleres and General Paz. The selection of the name followed an Argentine tradition of giving football teams English names, such as Boca Juniors, River Plate, All Boys, Newell's Old Boys, Racing Club, Chacarita Juniors, Argentinos Juniors and Chaco For Ever, among others.

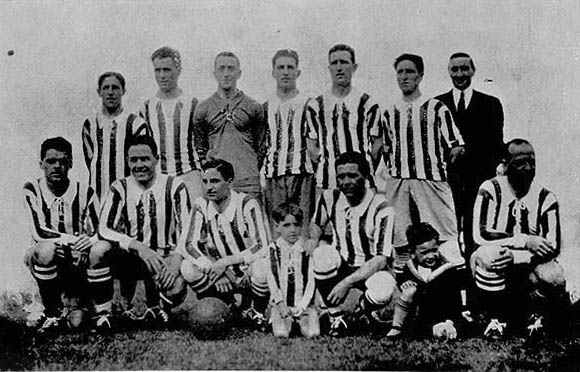
The team that won the 1925 División Intermedia championship.

During its first years the club had a financial crisis so the team had to play at minor leagues and was inactive from 1908 to 1915. In 1915 the club affiliated to Argentine Football Association to play at Primera C (the last division of Argentine football league system by then), promoting to "División Intermedia" (current Primera B Metropolitana) at the end of the season.

In 1920 the club renamed "Talleres Football Club", and five years later it promoted to Primera División, the top division of Argentina. The club also acquired the land where its headquarters and sports field are now located. Some years after, the club would adopt the current name, "Club Atlético Talleres".

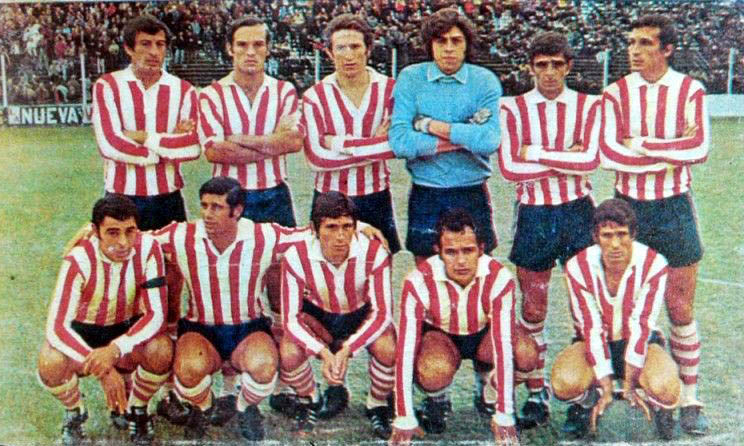
The 1970 squad promoted to the second division

Talleres merged with Club Atlético Lanús in 1934 to form a competitive team for the Primera División championship. The new club switched to "La Unión Talleres-Lanús" although the merger only lasted a year. Talleres played in Primera until 1938 when the team was relegated to the second division. Talleres has been playing in lower divisions and never returned to Primera since then.

In 1945 Talleres inaugurated a swimming pool and the club increased its social activities (the carnival celebrations amongst them). Likewise other sports were incorporated as sports, such as basketball, water polo, swimming and athletics.

In 1999 the club was declared bankrupt, being closed for a short time. In 2000 Talleres signed an agreement with Club Atlético Vélez Sarsfield which ended in 2003. At the end of 2008 Talleres could revoke the bankruptcy petition.

The club colours (red and white, in vertical stripes) were taken from the Alumni Athletic Club, a legendary team founded in 1893 by a group of students of the Buenos Aires English High School which was dissolved in 1913. Alumni was the most successful team during the first 20 years of Argentine football, having won 10 Primera División titles between 1900 and 1911, when the squad played its last official match versus Club Porteño.

== Notable former managers ==
- (Argentina) Ángel Bargas
- (Argentina) Oscar Calics
- (Argentina) Mariano Campodónico
- (Argentina) Adrián Czornomaz
- (Argentina) Héctor D'Angelo
- (Argentina) Federico Edwards
- (Paraguay) Manuel Fleitas Solich
- (Argentina) Claudio "Turco" García
- (Argentina) Jorge Ginarte
- (Argentina) Mario Gomez
- (Argentina) Hugo Gottardi
- (Argentina) Hernán Meske
- (Argentina) Juan Carlos Murúa
- (Argentina) Julio Olarticoechea
- (Argentina) Norberto Raffo
- (Argentina) Ricardo Rodríguez
- (Argentina) Hugo Smaldone
- (Argentina) Ricardo Trigilli
- (Argentina) Antonio Villamor
- (Argentina) Jorge Vivaldo
- (Argentina) José Yudica

== Honours ==
- División Intermedia (1): 1925 AAm (Note: The Asociación Amateurs de Football (Aam) was a dissident association that organized its own championships from 1919 to 1926.)
- Primera B (2): 1987–88, 2023
- Primera C (2): 1970, 1978
