= Sportivo Italiano =

Argentine association football club

- Full name: Club Sportivo Italiano
- Nickname: Azzurro
- Founded: 7 May 1955; 71 years ago
- Ground: República de Italia, Ciudad Evita, La Matanza Partido, Greater Buenos Aires
- Capacity: 8,000
- Chairman: Salvador D'Antonio
- Manager: Matías Giménez
- League: Primera C
- 2016: 2°
Home colours	Away colours	Third colours

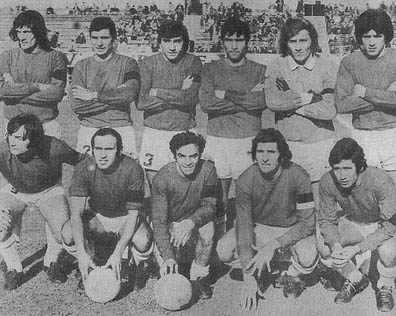
The 1974 Deportivo Italiano team that won the Primera C championship.

Club Sportivo Italiano is an Argentine professional football club located in Ciudad Evita, La Matanza Partido, Greater Buenos Aires. The team currently plays in the Primera B Metropolitana, the third division of the Argentine football league system.

The club was founded on May 7, 1955 by Italian immigrants who lived in Florida neighbourhood (part of Vicente López Partido in the Greater Buenos Aires). The club was originally named "Associazione del Calcio Italiano in Argentina". In 1978 the institution merged with Sociedad Italiana and changed its name to "Club Deportivo Italiano". The club's last name change occurred in 2000, when it became known under its current denomination "Club Sportivo Italiano".

The team mainly appeared in the 2nd and third division of Argentine football, although in the 1986–87 played its only season in the Argentine top flight. Despite finishing bottom of the league and being relegated, this was its highest league finish ever.

== Players ==
=== Current squad ===
Note: Flags indicate national team as defined under FIFA eligibility rules; some limited exceptions apply. Players may hold more than one non-FIFA nationality.

No.	Pos.	Nation	Player
—	GK	ARG	Rodrigo Drago
—	GK	PAR	Celso Capdevila
—	DF	URU	Héctor Vázquez
—	DF	ARG	Cesar Perez
—	DF	ARG	Gabriel Giménez
—	DF	ARG	Leonardo Gómez
—	DF	ARG	Ariel Martínez
—	DF	ARG	Rubén Darío Meozzi
—	DF	ARG	Julián Monachelli
—	MF	ARG	Daniel Imperiale
—	MF	ARG	Diego Bulacio
—	MF	ARG	Gonzalo Alvarez
—	MF	ARG	Gustavo Britos

No.	Pos.	Nation	Player
—	MF	ARG	Gabriel Correa
—	MF	ARG	Arturo Gauna
—	MF	ARG	Juan Augusto Huerta
—	MF	ARG	Sebastián Lamacchia
—	MF	ARG	Leonel Natalicchio
—	MF	ARG	Gustavo Pinto
—	FW	ARG	Lucas Vico
—	FW	ARG	Martín Castagnino
—	FW	ARG	Carlos Ibañez
—	FW	ARG	Francisco Rosa
—	FW	ARG	Mariano Sabadia
—	FW	ARG	Juan Pablo Zárate
—	FW	ARG	Victor Meza

== Notable managers ==
- (Spain) (Argentina) Ramón Cabrero (1985–87)

== Honours ==
- Primera B (3): 1986, 1995–96, 2008–09
- Primera C (3): 1962, 1974, 2013–14
- Primera D (1): 1960
