= Ciudad Evita =

- City
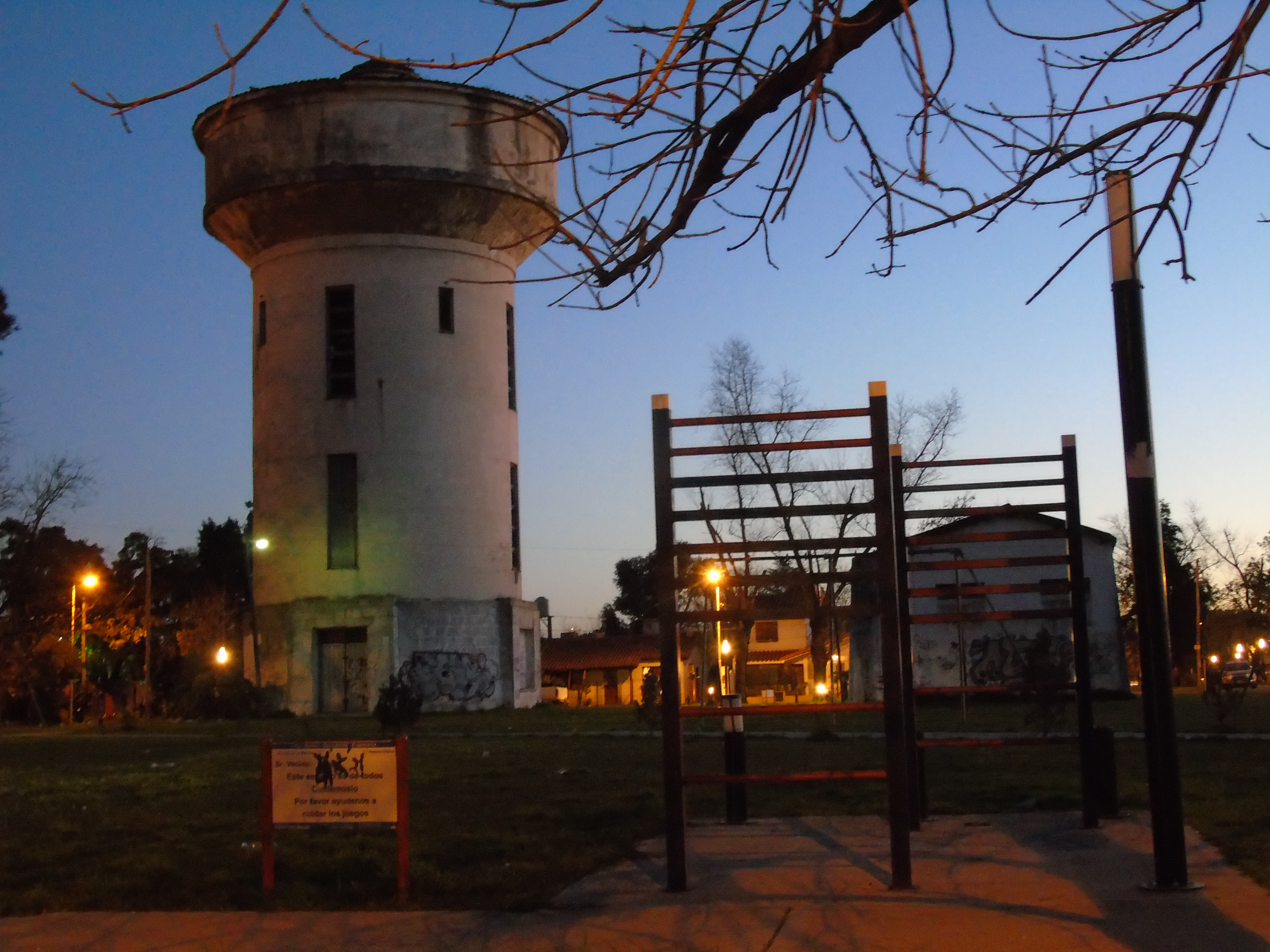

- Location in Greater Buenos Aires
- Coordinates: 34°43′S 58°32′W
- Country: Argentina
- Province: Buenos Aires
- Partido: La Matanza
- Founded: 1947
- Named for: Eva Perón

Area
  - Total: 22.3 km^{2} (8.6 sq mi)
- Elevation: 15 m (49 ft)

Population (2001 census [INDEC])
  - Total: 68,650
  - Density: 3,080/km^{2} (7,970/sq mi)
- CPA Base: B 1778
- Area code: +54 11

Ciudad Evita is a city in the partido of La Matanza in Buenos Aires Province, Argentina, located 20 kilometers (13 mi) from Downtown Buenos Aires within the Greater Buenos Aires metro area. Ciudad Evita has a population of 68,650 (2001).

== History ==
Ciudad Evita was established in 1947 by Argentine President Juan Perón in Decree No. 33221 as a planned community, and the initial settlement was developed by the Eva Perón Foundation. Perón's decree stipulated that this new suburb of Buenos Aires be named after the namesake of the foundation, his wife Eva "Evita" Duarte de Perón, and was named "Ciudad Evita" meaning Evita City in Spanish. the city's original 15,000 homes were designed in a simplified Spanish Colonial Revival style favored during the Perón era, and allegedly featured a street layout built in the shape of Eva Perón's profile, which seemingly "waved" to airline passengers from Ministro Pistarini International Airport, located 6 kilometers (4 mi) south of the city.

In 1955, following the Revolución Libertadora military coup that deposed Perón, the city's overt homage to the influential first lady prompted Ciudad Evita's renaming to Ciudad General Belgrano, in honor of General Manuel Belgrano. The city was administered by Banco Hipotecario following the coup, which covered all administrative activities except for some public services that were provided by the Municipality of La Matanza. The city continued to grow, incorporating the Barrio Vemme ward between 1960 and 1967. Ciudad Evita was transferred to La Matanza Council in 1963, and upon the return of Peronists to power in the 1973 general election, the city's name was reverted to Ciudad Evita. A second addition, Barrio Alas, was opened in 1974 for Argentine Air Force officers stationed at the Morón Air Base.

The March 1976 coup ousted the Peronist government and again led to a change of name for the town, this time to Ciudad General Martín Miguel de Güemes, in honor of General Martín Miguel de Güemes. The return of democracy in the 1983 general election led to the city's name being reverted to Ciudad Evita again, and the city was chosen as the site of the Buenos Aires Temple of the Church of Jesus Christ of Latter-day Saints which was dedicated in 1986. Ciudad Evita was declared a National Historic Monument of Argentina in 1997.

== Notable people ==
- Juan Ignacio Chela, tennis player
- Gabriel Furlán, racing driver
- Cristian Fabbiani, footballer
- Mauricio Hanuch, footballer
- Pocha Lamadrid, activist
