= 2024 Primera B Metropolitana =

Primera B Metropolitana
- Season: 2024
- Dates: 2 Feb – 14 Dec
- Champions: Colegiales (2nd. title)
- Promoted: Colegiales; Los Andes
- Relegated: Cañuelas
- 2025 Copa Argentina: Colegiales; Argentino de Quilmes; Deportivo Armenio; Excursionistas; Ferrocarril Midland; Los Andes
- Matches: 468
- Goals: 917 (1.96 per match)
- Top goalscorer: (Argentina) Leonel Barrios (17)

The 2024 Argentine Primera B Metropolitana was the 127th. season of Primera B Metropolitana, the third division of the Argentine football league system. The season began on 2 February and ended on 14 December 2024. Twenty-two teams competed in the league.

A total of 22 teams took part of the competition, with six teams from 2023 Primera C, they were Excursionistas, Deportivo Laferrere, Ferrocarril Midland, Sportivo Italiano, Liniers y San Martín de Burzaco, plus two relegated clubs from 2023 Primera Nacional, Flandria and Villa Dálmine.

The championship was won by Colegiales, winner of Torneo Clausura, which defeated Los Andes (winner of Apertura) in a two-legged series, also promoting to 2025 Primera Nacional.

== Format ==
During the course of a season, two round-robin tournaments were played. The two winners played each other and the winner was recognized as the Primera B champion and automatically promoted to Primera B Nacional.

The loser and the teams that held the six best positions at the aggregate table had the chance to enter the Torneo Reducido (small tournament) whose winner would be promoted.

The team with the lowest aggregate points total in Primera B Metropolitana was relegated to Primera C Metropolitana.

Besides, the champion and the five best placed teams qualified to 2025 Copa Argentina.

== Regular season ==
=== Apertura ===
Pos	Team	Pld	W	D	L	GF	GA	GD	Pts	Promotion or Qualification
1	Los Andes (Q)	21	14	4	3	29	16	+13	46	Qualification to Championship Final
2	Colegiales	21	13	5	3	33	13	+20	44	
3	Argentino de Quilmes	21	11	8	2	28	12	+16	41	
4	Deportivo Armenio	21	11	6	4	31	17	+14	39	
5	Dock Sud	21	10	5	6	27	22	+5	35	
6	Ferrocarril Midland	21	9	7	5	29	19	+10	34	
7	Excursionistas	21	9	6	6	30	21	+9	33	
8	Flandria	21	9	6	6	21	17	+4	33	
9	Fénix	21	6	12	3	24	19	+5	30	
10	Acassuso	21	7	5	9	16	25	−9	26	
11	Comunicaciones	21	6	7	8	25	20	+5	25	
12	Argentino de Merlo	21	6	7	8	18	20	−2	25	
13	Deportivo Merlo	21	6	7	8	15	18	−3	25	
14	San Martín de Burzaco	21	6	7	8	15	20	−5	25	
15	Deportivo Laferrere	21	5	9	7	23	28	−5	24	
16	Cañuelas	21	6	4	11	18	30	−12	22	
17	Sacachispas	21	6	3	12	14	35	−21	21	
18	Villa Dálmine	21	3	11	7	12	19	−7	20	
19	Liniers	21	5	4	12	12	18	−6	19	
20	Villa San Carlos	21	4	6	11	21	27	−6	18	
21	UAI Urquiza	21	3	9	9	19	31	−12	18	
22	Sportivo Italiano	21	2	10	9	16	29	−13	16	

Source: Soccerway
Rules for classification: 1) points; 2) goal difference; 3) goals scored; 4) head-to-head points; 5) head-to-head goal difference; 6) head-to-head goals scored.
(Q) Qualified for the phase indicated

=== Clausura ===
Pos	Team	Pld	W	D	L	GF	GA	GD	Pts	Promotion or Qualification
1	Colegiales (Q)	21	13	3	5	26	12	+14	42	Qualification to Championship Final
2	Deportivo Armenio	21	11	6	4	32	17	+15	39	
3	Argentino de Quilmes	21	10	9	2	24	9	+15	39	
4	Argentino de Merlo	21	11	4	6	29	24	+5	37	
5	Deportivo Merlo	21	10	7	4	21	16	+5	37	
6	Ferrocarril Midland	21	9	8	4	24	13	+11	35	
7	Comunicaciones	21	8	8	5	22	18	+4	32	
8	UAI Urquiza	21	9	5	7	24	25	−1	32	
9	Excursionistas	21	7	10	4	34	25	+9	31	
10	Liniers	21	7	9	5	20	16	+4	30	
11	Sportivo Italiano	21	6	9	6	22	19	+3	27	
12	Dock Sud	21	7	6	8	24	22	+2	27	
13	Villa Dálmine	21	7	6	8	10	13	−3	27	
14	Flandria	21	7	6	8	16	20	−4	27	
15	Sacachispas	21	6	6	9	13	22	−9	24	
16	Los Andes	21	5	6	10	16	21	−5	21	Apertura winners, assured of Championship Final
17	Villa San Carlos	21	4	8	9	12	19	−7	20	
18	Acassuso	21	4	8	9	15	24	−9	20	
19	San Martín de Burzaco	21	5	5	11	14	23	−9	20	
20	Deportivo Laferrere	21	3	10	8	14	27	−13	19	
21	Fénix	21	4	5	12	9	23	−14	17	
22	Cañuelas	21	3	6	12	12	25	−13	15	

Source: Soccerway
Rules for classification: 1) points; 2) goal difference; 3) goals scored; 4) head-to-head points; 5) head-to-head goal difference; 6) head-to-head goals scored.
(Q) Qualified for the phase indicated

== Aggregate table ==
Pos	Team	Pld	W	D	L	GF	GA	GD	Pts	Promotion or Qualification
1	Colegiales	42	26	8	8	59	25	+34	86	Advance to Championship Final and qualification for Copa Argentina
2	Argentino de Quilmes	42	21	17	4	52	21	+31	80	Advance to Torneo Reducido and qualification for Copa Argentina
3	Deportivo Armenio	42	22	12	8	63	34	+29	78	Advance to Torneo Reducido and qualification for Copa Argentina
4	Ferrocarril Midland	42	18	15	9	53	32	+21	69	Advance to Torneo Reducido and qualification for Copa Argentina
5	Los Andes	42	19	10	13	45	37	+8	67	Advance to Championship Final and qualification for Copa Argentina
6	Excursionistas	42	16	16	10	64	46	+18	64	Advance to Torneo Reducido and qualification for Copa Argentina
7	Dock Sud	42	17	11	14	51	44	+7	62	Advance to Torneo Reducido
8	Argentino de Merlo	42	17	11	14	47	44	+3	62	Advance to Torneo Reducido
9	Deportivo Merlo	42	16	14	12	36	34	+2	62	
10	Flandria	42	16	12	14	37	37	0	60	
11	Comunicaciones	42	14	15	13	47	38	+9	57	
12	UAI Urquiza	42	12	14	16	43	56	−13	50	
13	Liniers	42	12	13	17	32	34	−2	49	
14	Fénix	42	10	17	15	33	42	−9	47	
15	Villa Dálmine	42	10	17	15	22	32	−10	47	
16	Acassuso	42	11	13	18	31	49	−18	46	
17	San Martín de Burzaco	42	11	12	19	29	43	−14	45	
18	Sacachispas	42	12	9	21	27	57	−30	45	
19	Sportivo Italiano	42	8	19	15	38	48	−10	43	
20	Deportivo Laferrere	42	8	19	15	37	55	−18	43	
21	Villa San Carlos	42	8	14	20	33	46	−13	38	
22	Cañuelas	42	9	10	23	30	55	−25	37	Relegation to Primera C Metropolitana

Source: Soccerway
Rules for classification: 1) points; 2) goal difference; 3) goals scored; 4) head-to-head points; 5) head-to-head goal difference; 6) head-to-head goals scored.

== Championship finals ==
The winners of Torneo Apertura (Los Andes) and Clausura (Colegiales) played a two-legged series to decide the champions and the first team promoted to Primera Nacional. The losing team entered the Torneo Reducido in the second round.

=== First leg ===
9 November 2024
15:45 UTC−3

Los Andes	0–0	Colegiales
	Report

Estadio Eduardo Gallardón, Lomas de Zamora
Referee: Felipe Viola

=== Second leg ===
16 November 2024
19:00 UTC−3

Colegiales	2–0	Los Andes
Marra 27'; Camargo 67'	Report

Estadio Libertarios Unidos, Florida Oeste
Referee: Edgardo Zamora

Team details

Colegiales
Los Andes

GK	1	Emilio Di Fulvio	Yellow card
DF	4	Diego Magallanes (c)
DF	2	Ian Rasso
DF	6	Federico Marchesini
DF	3	Franco Hanashiro	Yellow card
MF	8	Matias Machado
MF	5	Joaquín Cancio
MF	7	Laureano Marra		Substituted off
MF	10	Santiago Camacho		Substituted off
MF	11	Álvaro Marín		Substituted off
FW	9	Felix Villacorta		Substituted off
Substitutions:
DF	14	Mauricio Camargo		Substituted on
MF	15	Facundo Montiel		Substituted on
FW	17	Nazareno Diósquez		Substituted on
FW	20	Nicolás Toloza		Substituted on
Manager:
(Argentina) Leonardo Fernández

GK	1	Sebastián López (c)
DF	4	Gabriel Cañete		Substituted off
DF	2	Guido Segalerba	Yellow card
DF	6	Héctor Igarzabal	Yellow card
DF	3	Nazareno Fernández
MF	11	Taiel Arancibia		Substituted off
MF	5	Leonardo López	Yellow card	Substituted off
MF	8	Ezequiel Gallegos
MF	10	Lautaro Torres		Substituted off
FW	7	Matías González		Substituted off
FW	9	Manuel Brondo	Yellow card
Substitutions:
MF	15	Aaron Sandoval	Substituted on
FW	17	Axel Páez		Substituted on
FW	18	Ivo Kestler		Substituted on
FW	19	Gastón Gerzel		Substituted on
FW	20	Federico Martínez		Substituted on
Manager:
(Argentina) Leonardo Lemos

Note: Colegiales won the series 3–1 on points (2–0 on goal difference), promoting to Primera B Nacional.

== Torneo Reducido ==
The teams best placed in the general table (with the exception of winners of Torneo Apertura and Clausura) qualified to "Torneo Reducido", an elimination tournament played over two legs which will define the team that will play a promotion playoff against a team from Torneo Federal A seeking promotion to Primera Nacional. Best placed teams will face worst placed teams (p.e., 1 vs 6, 2 vs 5, 3 vs 4). In the second round, the championship final loser will enter the Reducido. In case of the series ended in a tie, a penalty shoot-out will be conducted, with no extra time.

=== First round ===
Team 1	Agg.	Team 2	1st leg	2nd leg
Argentino de Quilmes	4–1	Argentino de Merlo	1–0	3–1
Deportivo Armenio	3–0	Dock Sud	2–0	1–0
Ferrocarril Midland	1–1 (3–4 p)	Excursionistas	1–1	0–0

==== First leg ====
8 Nov 2024	Excursionistas	1–1	Ferrocarril Midland	Buenos Aires
20:30 UTC−3	Barrios 61'	Report	Frattini 46'	Stadium: Estadio de Excursionistas; Referee: Wenceslao Meneses

10 Nov 2024	Dock Sud	0–2	Deportivo Armenio	Dock Sud
11:00 UTC−3		Report	Maldonado 49'; López 81'	Stadium: Estadio de los Inmigrantes; Referee: Gastón Iglesias

10 Nov 2024	Argentino de Merlo	0–1	Argentino de Quilmes	Merlo
15:00 UTC−3		Report	Alegre 84'	Stadium: Estadio Argentino de Merlo; Referee: Américo Monsalvo

==== Second leg ====
16 Nov 2024	Deportivo Armenio	1–0	Dock Sud	Ingeniero Maschwitz
17:00 UTC−3	Barbieri 83'	Report		Stadium: Estadio Armenia; Referee: Ariel Cruz

17 Nov 2024	Ferrocarril Midland	0–0 (3–4 p)	Excursionistas	Libertad
17:00 UTC−3				Stadium: Estadio Ciudad de Libertad; Referee: Gonzalo Pereira

17 Nov 2024	Argentino de Quilmes	3–1	Argentino de Merlo	Quilmes
17:00 UTC−3				Stadium: Estadio Argentino de Quilmes; Referee: Sebastián Bresba

=== Semifinals ===
Team 1	Agg.	Team 2	1st leg	2nd leg
Argentino de Quilmes	1–0	Excursionistas	0–0	1–0
Deportivo Armenio	2–3	Los Andes	1–0	1–3

==== First leg ====
23 Nov 2024	Excursionistas	0–0	Argentino de Quilmes	Buenos Aires
				Stadium: Estadio de Excursionistas

25 Nov 2024	Los Andes	0–1	Deportivo Armenio	Lomas de Zamora
				Stadium: Estadio Eduardo Gallardón

==== Second leg ====
2 Dec 2024	Argentino de Quilmes	1–0	Excursionistas	Quilmes
				Stadium: Estadio Argentino de Quilmes

1 Dec 2024	Deportivo Armenio	1–3	Los Andes	Ingeniero Maschwitz
				Stadium: Estadio Armenia

=== Final ===
Team 1	Agg.	Team 2	1st leg	2nd leg
Argentino de Quilmes	1–1 (4–5 p)	Los Andes	0–1	1–0

==== First leg ====
8 Dec 2024	Los Andes	1–0	Argentino de Quilmes	Lomas de Zamora
	Gerzel 49'	Report		Stadium: Estadio Eduardo Gallardón; Referee: Américo Monsalvo

==== Second leg ====
14 Dec 2024	Argentino de Quilmes	1–0 (4–5 p)	Los Andes	Quilmes
	J.E. Martínez 6'			Stadium: Estadio Argentino de Quilmes; Referee: Ignacio Lupani

Note: Los Andes qualified to play the final v Sarmiento (LB) (winner of "Reválida" of 2024 Torneo Federal A) to define another promotion to Primera Nacional.

== Second promotion final ==
Winners of Torneo Reducido (Los Andes) and Sarmiento (LB) (winner of "Reválida" stage of 2024 Torneo Federal A) will play a match to define which team promote to the second division in order to play the 2025 Primera Nacional season.

21 December 2024

Los Andes	1–0	Sarmiento (LB)
M. González 28'

Estadio Julio César Villagra, Córdoba
Referee: Ariel Penel

Team details

Los Andes
Sarmiento (LB)

GK	1	Sebastián López (c)
DF	4	Lucas Barrientos
DF	6	Guido Segalerba
DF	2	Gonzalo Cozzoni	Yellow card
DF	3	Nazareno Fernández
MF	7	Matías González		Substituted off
MF	5	Gabriel Cañete		Substituted off
MF	10	Matías Gómez		Substituted off
MF	8	Gastón Gerzel		Substituted off
FW	9	Manuel Brondo		Substituted off
FW	11	Federico Martínez	Yellow card
Substitutions:
DF	13	Robertino Canavesio		Substituted on
MF	14	Leonardo J. López		Substituted on
DF	16	Luciano Maidana		Substituted on
MF	19	Ezequiel Gallegos		Substituted on	Yellow card
FW	23	Ivo Kestler		Substituted on
Manager:
(Argentina) Leonardo Lemos

GK	1	Juan Mendonca
DF	4	Raúl Chamorro
DF	2	Rodrigo Herrera (c)	Yellow card
DF	6	Gabriel Fernández
DF	3	Alan Tévez		Substituted off
MF	8	Axel Pinto		Substituted off
MF	5	Nicolás Juárez
MF	10	Pablo López	Yellow card	Substituted off
FW	7	Nahuel Speck		Substituted off
FW	9	Brian Risso Patrón		Substituted off
FW	11	Claudio Vega
Substitutions:
MF	16	Emanuel Cuevas		Substituted on
FW	18	Facundo Pérez		Substituted on
FW	19	Matías Pato		Substituted on
MF	20	Iván Garzón		Substituted on
MF	22	Adrián Toloza		Substituted on
Manager:
(Argentina) Pablo Martel

Note: Los Andes became the 2nd. team to promote to Primera Nacional.

== See also ==
- 2024 Argentine Primera División
- 2024 Primera Nacional
- 2024 Torneo Federal A
- 2024 Primera C Metropolitana
- 2024 Copa Argentina
