= 1994–95 Primera B Nacional =

9th season of the second-tier football league in Argentina

Primera B Nacional
- Season: 1994–95
- Champions: Estudiantes (LP) (1st divisional title)
- Promoted: Estudiantes (LP); Colón
- Relegated: Sportivo Italiano; Deportivo Laferrere; Talleres (RE)
- Top goalscorer: Alejandro Abaurre 29 goals

The 1994–95 Argentine Primera B Nacional was the ninth season of second division professional of football in Argentina. A total of 22 teams competed; the champion and runner-up were promoted to Argentine Primera División.

== Club information ==
Club	City	Stadium
All Boys	Floresta	Islas Malvinas
Almirante Brown	Isidro Casanova	Fragata Presidente Sarmiento
Arsenal	Sarandí	Julio H. Grondona
Atlético de Rafaela	Rafaela	Nuevo Monumental
Atlético Tucumán	San Miguel de Tucumán	Monumental Presidente Jose Fierro
Central Córdoba	Rosario	Gabino Sosa
Chacarita Juniors	Villa Maipú	Chacarita Juniors
Colón	Santa Fe	Brigadier General Estanislao López
Deportivo Laferrere	Gregorio de Laferrere	José Luis Sánchez
Deportivo Morón	Morón	Francisco Urbano
Douglas Haig	Pergamino	Miguel Morales
Estudiantes	La Plata	Jorge Luis Hirschi
Gimnasia y Tiro	Salta	Gigante del Norte
Godoy Cruz	Mendoza	Malvinas Argentinas
Instituto	Córdoba	Presidente Perón
Los Andes	Lomas de Zamora	Eduardo Gallardón
Nueva Chicago	Mataderos	Nueva Chicago
Quilmes	Quilmes	Centenario
San Martín	San Miguel de Tucumán	La Ciudadela
Sportivo Italiano	Ciudad Evita	Republica de Italia
Talleres	Remedios de Escalada	Talleres de Remedios de Escalada
Unión	Santa Fe	15 de Abril

== Standings ==
Estudiantes (LP) was declared champion and was automatically promoted to Primera División, and the teams placed 2nd to 8th qualified for the Second Promotion Playoff.

Pos	Team	Pld	W	D	L	GF	GA	GD	Pts	Promotion or qualification
1	Estudiantes (LP)	42	27	11	4	86	34	+52	65	Champion, promoted to Primera División
2	Atlético de Rafaela	42	21	12	9	68	38	+30	54	Qualified for the Second Promotion Playoff
3	Colón	42	20	12	10	73	44	+29	52	Qualified for the Second Promotion Playoff
4	Godoy Cruz	42	20	10	12	68	49	+19	50	Qualified for the Second Promotion Playoff
5	San Martín (T)	42	20	8	14	68	50	+18	48	Qualified for the Second Promotion Playoff
6	Gimnasia y Tiro	42	17	14	11	51	49	+2	48	Qualified for the Second Promotion Playoff
7	Quilmes	42	13	19	10	48	40	+8	45	Qualified for the Second Promotion Playoff
8	All Boys	42	16	13	13	66	63	+3	45	Qualified for the Second Promotion Playoff
9	Douglas Haig	42	15	15	12	45	45	0	45	
10	Unión	42	17	12	13	70	54	+16	43 (Note: 3 points deducted)	
11	Instituto	42	14	15	13	68	70	−2	43	
12	Nueva Chicago	42	14	13	15	55	61	−6	41	
13	Deportivo Morón	42	12	17	13	43	49	−6	41	
14	Chacarita Juniors	42	10	20	12	51	55	−4	40	
15	Los Andes	42	14	11	17	47	48	−1	39	
16	Central Córdoba (R)	42	12	15	15	50	56	−6	39	
17	Almirante Brown	42	13	13	16	48	57	−9	39	
18	Arsenal	42	9	18	15	47	61	−14	36	
19	Sportivo Italiano	42	10	12	20	39	53	−14	32	
20	Atlético Tucumán	42	9	14	19	45	67	−22	32	
21	Deportivo Laferrere	42	5	13	24	29	82	−53	23	
22	Talleres (RE)	42	6	9	27	26	69	−43	21	

== Second Promotion Playoff ==
The Second Promotion Playoff or Torneo Reducido was played by the teams placed 2nd to 8th in the overall standings: Atlético de Rafaela (2nd), Colón (3rd), Godoy Cruz (4th), San Martín (T) (5th), Gimnasia y Tiro (6th), Quilmes (7th) and All Boys (8th), and the champion of Primera B Metropolitana: Atlanta. The winning team was promoted to Primera División.

=== Bracket ===
Quarterfinals
3	Colón (a)	1	0	1
8	All Boys	1	0	1
4	Godoy Cruz (a)	1	0	1
7	Quilmes	1	0	1
2	Atlético de Rafaela^{1}	1	2	3
PBM	Atlanta	2	1	3
5	San Martín (T)	0	1	1
6	Gimnasia y Tiro	0	0	0

Semifinals
3	Colón	0	5	5
4	Godoy Cruz	0	0	0
2	Atlético de Rafaela	0	0	0
5	San Martín (T)	1	0	1

Final
3	Colón	1	3	4
5	San Martín (T)	0	1	1

1: Qualified because of sport advantage.

- Note: The team in the first line plays at home the second leg.

=== Finals ===
Torneo Reducido Final
(2nd. promotion playoff)
23 Jul 1995
First leg

San Martín (T)	0–1	Colón
	Report	Marini

Estadio La Ciudadela, Tucumán

29 Jul 1995
Second leg

Colón	3–1	San Martín (T)
Gambier 7', 86'; Uliambre 29'	Report	Salgado 52'

Estadio Brigadier López, Santa Fe
Attendance: 25,000
Referee: Francisco Lamolina

Team details

Colón
San Martín (T)

GK	Leonardo Díaz
DF	Hugo Ibarra
DF	Horacio Ameli
DF	Marcelo Kobistyj
DF	Dante Unali
MF	Javier López
MF	Ricardo Kuzemka
MF	Ricardo Solbes
MF	Gabriel González
FW	Pedro Uliambre
FW	Miguel Ángel Gambier
Substitutes:
Manager:
(Uruguay) Nelson Chabay

GK	Rubén Urquiza
DF	Ramón Galarza
DF	Gustavo Del Castillo
DF	Mario Jiménez
DF	Gustavo Rescaldani
MF	Marcelo Romagnoli
MF	Daniel Bini
MF	Oscar Salomón
FW	Daniel Hernández
FW	Claudio Rodríguez
FW	José Zelaya
Substitutes:
Manager:
(Argentina) Ricardo Gareca

Note: Colón won 4–1 on aggregate and promoted to Primera División.

== Relegation ==
Pos	Team	1992–93 Pts	1993–94 Pts	1994–95 Pts	Total Pts	Total Pld	Avg	Situation	Affiliation
1	Estudiantes (LP)	—	—	65	65	42	1.548		Direct
2	Colón	56	47	52	155	126	1.23		Direct
3	Godoy Cruz	—	—	50	50	42	1.19		Indirect
4	Gimnasia y Tiro	51	—	48	99	84	1.179		Indirect
5	Quilmes	45	55	45	145	126	1.151		Direct
6	San Martín (T)	—	47	48	95	84	1.131		Indirect
7	Atlético de Rafaela	43	42	54	139	126	1.103		Indirect
8	All Boys	—	45	45	90	84	1.071		Direct
9	Nueva Chicago	44	46	41	131	126	1.04		Direct
10	Instituto	41	46	43	130	126	1.032		Indirect
11	Unión	43	43	44	130	126	1.032		Direct
12	Arsenal	45	43	36	124	126	0.984		Direct
13	Almirante Brown	45	38	39	122	126	0.968		Direct
14	Deportivo Morón	35	45	41	121	126	0.96		Direct
15	Chacarita Juniors	—	—	40	40	42	0.952		Direct
16	Douglas Haig	34	41	45	120	126	0.952		Indirect
17	Atlético Tucumán	42	45	32	119	126	0.944		Indirect
18	Central Córdoba (R)	46	34	39	119	126	0.944		Direct
19	Los Andes	—	—	39	42	42	0.929		Direct
20	Sportivo Italiano	48	36	32	116	126	0.921	Primera B Metropolitana	Direct
21	Deportivo Laferrere	40	39	23	102	126	0.81	Primera B Metropolitana	Direct
22	Talleres (RE)	41	32	21	94	126	0.746	Primera B Metropolitana	Direct

Note: Clubs with indirect affiliation with AFA are relegated to their respective league of his province according to the Argentine football league system, while clubs directly affiliated face relegation to Primera B Metropolitana. Clubs with direct affiliation are all from Greater Buenos Aires, with the exception of Newell's, Rosario Central, Central Córdoba and Argentino de Rosario, all from Rosario, and Unión and Colón from Santa Fe.

== See also ==
- 1994–95 in Argentine football
