= 1993–94 Primera B Nacional =

8th season of the second-tier football league in Argentina

Primera B Nacional
- Season: 1993–94
- Champions: Gimnasia y Esgrima (J) (1st divisional title)
- Promoted: Gimnasia y Esgrima (J); Talleres (C)
- Relegated: Ituzaingó; Sarmiento (J); Chaco For Ever
- Top goalscorer: Dante Fernández (29 goals)

The 1993–94 Argentine Primera B Nacional was the eighth season of second division professional of football in Argentina. A total of 22 teams competed; the champion and runner-up were promoted to Argentine Primera División.

== Club information ==
| Club | City | Stadium |
|---|---|---|
| All Boys | Floresta | Islas Malvinas |
| Almirante Brown | Isidro Casanova | Fragata Presidente Sarmiento |
| Arsenal | Sarandí | Julio H. Grondona |
| Atlético de Rafaela | Rafaela | Nuevo Monumental |
| Atlético Tucumán | San Miguel de Tucumán | Monumental Presidente Jose Fierro |
| Central Córdoba | Rosario | Gabino Sosa |
| Chaco For Ever | Resistencia | Juan Alberto García |
| Colón | Santa Fe | Brigadier General Estanislao López |
| Deportivo Laferrere | Gregorio de Laferrere | José Luis Sánchez |
| Deportivo Morón | Morón | Francisco Urbano |
| Douglas Haig | Pergamino | Miguel Morales |
| Gimnasia y Esgrima | San Salvador de Jujuy | 23 de Agosto |
| Instituto | Córdoba | Presidente Perón |
| Ituzaingó | Ituzaingó | Ituzaingó |
| Nueva Chicago | Mataderos | Nueva Chicago |
| Quilmes | Quilmes | Centenario |
| San Martín | San Miguel de Tucumán | La Ciudadela |
| Sarmiento | Junín | Eva Perón |
| Sportivo Italiano | Ciudad Evita | Republica de Italia |
| Talleres | Córdoba | La Boutique |
| Talleres | Remedios de Escalada | Talleres de Remedios de Escalada |
| Unión | Santa Fe | 15 de Abril |

== Standings ==
Gimnasia y Esgrima (J) was declared champion and was automatically promoted to Primera División, and the teams placed 2nd to 8th qualified for the Second Promotion Playoff.

| Pos | Team | Pld | W | D | L | GF | GA | GD | Pts | Promotion or qualification |
|---|---|---|---|---|---|---|---|---|---|---|
| 1 | Gimnasia y Esgrima (J) | 42 | 21 | 16 | 5 | 66 | 36 | +30 | 58 | Champion, promoted to Primera División |
| 2 | Quilmes | 42 | 20 | 15 | 7 | 71 | 41 | +30 | 55 | Qualified for the Second Promotion Playoff |
| 3 | San Martín (T) | 42 | 14 | 19 | 9 | 51 | 39 | +12 | 47 | Qualified for the Second Promotion Playoff |
| 4 | Colón | 42 | 17 | 13 | 12 | 59 | 49 | +10 | 47 | Qualified for the Second Promotion Playoff |
| 5 | Talleres (C) | 42 | 15 | 17 | 10 | 42 | 34 | +8 | 47 | Qualified for the Second Promotion Playoff |
| 6 | Nueva Chicago | 42 | 16 | 14 | 12 | 70 | 52 | +18 | 46 | Qualified for the Second Promotion Playoff |
| 7 | Instituto | 42 | 16 | 14 | 12 | 59 | 50 | +9 | 46 | Qualified for the Second Promotion Playoff |
| 8 | Atlético Tucumán | 42 | 18 | 9 | 15 | 64 | 52 | +12 | 45 | Qualified for the Second Promotion Playoff |
| 9 | All Boys | 42 | 18 | 9 | 15 | 55 | 59 | −4 | 45 | |
| 10 | Deportivo Morón | 42 | 15 | 15 | 12 | 61 | 72 | −11 | 45 | |
| 11 | Arsenal | 42 | 13 | 17 | 12 | 42 | 39 | +3 | 43 | |
| 12 | Unión | 42 | 15 | 13 | 14 | 55 | 54 | +1 | 43 | |
| 13 | Atlético de Rafaela | 42 | 13 | 16 | 13 | 52 | 50 | +2 | 42 | |
| 14 | Douglas Haig | 42 | 12 | 17 | 13 | 50 | 52 | −2 | 41 | |
| 15 | Deportivo Laferrere | 42 | 11 | 17 | 14 | 45 | 54 | −9 | 39 | |
| 16 | Almirante Brown | 42 | 12 | 14 | 16 | 51 | 63 | −12 | 38 | |
| 17 | Sportivo Italiano | 42 | 11 | 14 | 17 | 41 | 43 | −2 | 36 | |
| 18 | Sarmiento (J) | 42 | 9 | 18 | 15 | 43 | 55 | −12 | 36 | |
| 19 | Central Córdoba (R) | 42 | 9 | 16 | 17 | 44 | 63 | −19 | 34 | |
| 20 | Talleres (RE) | 42 | 9 | 14 | 19 | 35 | 58 | −23 | 32 | |
| 21 | Ituzaingó | 42 | 9 | 12 | 21 | 36 | 52 | −16 | 30 | |
| 22 | Chaco For Ever | 42 | 6 | 17 | 19 | 28 | 53 | −25 | 29 | |

== Second Promotion Playoff ==
The Second Promotion Playoff or Torneo Reducido was played by the teams placed 2nd to 8th in the overall standings: Quilmes (2nd), San Martín (T) (3rd), Colón (4th), Talleres (C) (5th), Nueva Chicago (6th), Instituto (7th) and Atlético Tucumán (8th), and the champion of Primera B Metropolitana: Chacarita Juniors. The winning team was promoted to Primera División.

=== Bracket ===
Quarterfinals
3 | San Martín (T) (a) | 2 | 1 | 3
8 | Atlético Tucumán | 2 | 1 | 3
5 | Talleres (C) (a) | 2 | 0 | 2
6 | Nueva Chicago | 2 | 0 | 2
2 | Quilmes | 1 | 1 | 2
PBM | Chacarita Juniors | 0 | 1 | 1
4 | Colón | 0 | 1 | 1
7 | Instituto | 2 | 2 | 4

Semifinals
3 | San Martín (T) | 0 | 0 | 0
5 | Talleres (C) | 2 | 0 | 2
2 | Quilmes | 0 | 3 | 3
7 | Instituto | 3 | 3 | 6

Final
5 | Talleres (C) | 1 | 3 | 4
7 | Instituto | 1 | 1 | 2

- Note: The team in the first line plays at home the second leg.

=== Finals ===
Torneo Reducido final
(2nd. promotion playoff)
30 July 1994
First leg

| Instituto | 1–1 | Talleres (C) |

6 August 1994
Second leg

| Talleres (C) | 3–1 | Instituto |
|---|---|---|
| Kesman 5'; Benítez 76'; Osorio 86' | Report | Guerrero 40' (pen.) |

Estadio Chateau Carreras, Córdoba

Team details

Talleres

Instituto

| GK | Gustavo Irusta |
| DF | Rodolfo Graieb |
| DF | Daniel Kesman |
| DF | Catalino Rivarola |
| DF | José María Rozzi |
| MF | Arsenio Benítez |
| MF | Gustavo Chacoma |
| MF | Silvio Risso |
| MF | Omar Gauna |
| FW | Ariel Boldrini |
| FW | Oscar Osorio |
Substitutes:
Manager:
(Argentina) Daniel Willington

| GK | Rubén Del Olmo |
| DF | Francisco Guerrero |
| DF | Claudio Becacceci |
| DF | Federico Bessone |
| DF | José Alberto Flores |
| MF | Claudio Marchetti |
| MF | Sergio González |
| MF | Mario Ghirardo |
| FW | Nicolás Oliva |
| FW | Sergio Bonfigli |
| FW | Diego Klimowicz |
Substitutes:
Manager:
(Argentina) Jorge Ginarte

Note: Talleres de Córdoba won 4–2 on aggregate, promoting to Primera División.

== Relegation ==
| Pos | Team | 1991–92 Pts | 1992–93 Pts | 1993–94 Pts | Total Pts | Total Pld | Avg | Situation | Affiliation |
|---|---|---|---|---|---|---|---|---|---|
| 1 | Gimnasia y Esgrima (J) | — | — | 58 | 58 | 42 | 1.381 | | Indirect |
| 2 | Colón | 52 | 56 | 47 | 155 | 126 | 1.23 | | Direct |
| 3 | Quilmes | — | 45 | 55 | 100 | 84 | 1.19 | | Direct |
| 4 | San Martín (T) | 51 | — | 47 | 98 | 84 | 1.167 | | Indirect |
| 5 | Talleres (C) | — | — | 47 | 47 | 42 | 1.119 | | Indirect |
| 6 | Nueva Chicago | 49 | 44 | 46 | 139 | 126 | 1.103 | | Direct |
| 7 | All Boys | — | — | 45 | 45 | 42 | 1.071 | | Direct |
| 8 | Almirante Brown | 52 | 45 | 38 | 135 | 126 | 1.071 | | Direct |
| 9 | Instituto | 47 | 41 | 46 | 134 | 126 | 1.063 | | Indirect |
| 10 | Atlético Tucumán | 46 | 42 | 45 | 133 | 126 | 1.056 | | Indirect |
| 11 | Arsenal | — | 45 | 43 | 88 | 84 | 1.048 | | Direct |
| 12 | Unión | — | 43 | 43 | 86 | 84 | 1.024 | | Direct |
| 13 | Douglas Haig | 50 | 34 | 41 | 125 | 126 | 0.992 | | Indirect |
| 14 | Central Córdoba (R) | 42 | 46 | 34 | 122 | 126 | 0.968 | | Direct |
| 15 | Sportivo Italiano | 38 | 48 | 36 | 122 | 126 | 0.968 | | Direct |
| 16 | Deportivo Morón | 41 | 35 | 45 | 121 | 126 | 0.96 | | Direct |
| 17 | Atlético de Rafaela | 35 | 43 | 42 | 120 | 126 | 0.952 | | Indirect |
| 18 | Deportivo Laferrere | 39 | 40 | 39 | 118 | 126 | 0.937 | | Direct |
| 19 | Talleres (RE) | 44 | 41 | 32 | 117 | 126 | 0.929 | | Direct |
| 20 | Chaco For Ever | 46 | 41 | 29 | 116 | 126 | 0.921 | Liga Chaqueña de fútbol | Indirect |
| 21 | Sarmiento (J) | — | — | 36 | 36 | 42 | 0.857 | Primera B Metropolitana | Direct |
| 22 | Ituzaingó | — | 38 | 30 | 68 | 84 | 0.81 | Primera B Metropolitana | Direct |

Note: Clubs with indirect affiliation with AFA are relegated to their respective league of his province according to the Argentine football league system, while clubs directly affiliated face relegation to Primera B Metropolitana. Clubs with direct affiliation are all from Greater Buenos Aires, with the exception of Newell's, Rosario Central, Central Córdoba and Argentino de Rosario, all from Rosario, and Unión and Colón from Santa Fe.

== See also ==
- 1993–94 in Argentine football
