= Matías Coselli =

Argentine professional footballer

Personal information
- Full name: Matías Nicolás Coselli
- Date of birth: 27 February 1990 (age 36)
- Place of birth: Gregorio de Laferrère, Argentina
- Height: 1.83 m (6 ft 0 in)
- Position: Forward

Team information
- Current team: Argentino

Youth career
- 2001–2002: San Lorenzo
- 2002–2008: Deportivo Laferrere

Senior career*
Years	Team	Apps	(Gls)
2008–2014	Deportivo Laferrere	17	(0)
2011–2012	→ Centro Español (loan)	27	(6)
2012–2013	→ Lugano (loan)	32	(9)
2014	Central Ballester	8	(0)
2015–2017	Deportivo Paraguayo	50	(15)
2017–2018	Victoriano Arenas	42	(31)
2019	Deportivo Español	8	(0)
2019–	Argentino	24	(10)
- * Club domestic league appearances and goals as of 12:57, 14 October 2020 (UTC)

Matías Nicolás Coselli (born 27 February 1990) is an Argentine professional footballer who plays as a forward for Argentino.

== Career ==
Coselli began his career with Deportivo Laferrere, after joining from San Lorenzo in 2002. He broke into the Primera C Metropolitana team's senior ranks for six years from 2008, making 17 appearances for the club. During his time with the Greater Buenos Aires outfit, he was loaned out twice - to Primera D Metropolitana duo Centro Español and Lugano, netting six and nine goals respectively. In 2014, Coselli moved to the fellow fifth tier team Central Ballester, where he made eight appearances. The following year, he signed with Deportivo Paraguayo. His stay there lasted three seasons, as he scored fifteen in fifty.

On 30 June 2017, Coselli agreed to terms with Victoriano Arenas. Nineteen goals arrived in his opening campaign, as they won promotion as champions to Primera C Metropolitana in 2017–18. He followed that up with twelve further goals in tier four, which led to Coselli's departure to Primera B Metropolitana's Deportivo Español in January 2019. He made his debut on 1 February during a goalless draw against Tristán Suárez, with the forward appearing seven more times without netting in a season that concluded with relegation. Coselli joined Argentino in July 2019, scoring ten times in 2019–20.

== Career statistics ==
As of 14 October 2020.

Appearances and goals by club, season and competition
Club	Season	League			Cup		League Cup		Continental		Other		Total	
Club	Season	Division	Apps	Goals	Apps	Goals	Apps	Goals	Apps	Goals	Apps	Goals	Apps	Goals
Deportivo Laferrere	2011–12	Primera C Metropolitana	0	0	0	0	—		—		0	0	0	0
Deportivo Laferrere	2012–13	Primera C Metropolitana	0	0	0	0	—		—		0	0	0	0
Deportivo Laferrere	Total		0	0	0	0	—		—		0	0	0	0
Centro Español (loan)	2011–12	Primera D Metropolitana	27	6	1	0	—		—		0	0	28	6
Lugano (loan)	2012–13	Primera D Metropolitana	32	9	0	0	—		—		0	0	32	9
Central Ballester	2014	Primera D Metropolitana	8	0	0	0	—		—		0	0	8	0
Victoriano Arenas	2017–18	Primera D Metropolitana	27	19	0	0	—		—		0	0	27	19
Victoriano Arenas	2018–19	Primera C Metropolitana	15	12	1	0	—		—		0	0	16	12
Victoriano Arenas	Total		42	31	1	0	—		—		0	0	43	31
Deportivo Español	2018–19	Primera B Metropolitana	8	0	0	0	—		—		0	0	8	0
Argentino	2019–20	Primera C Metropolitana	24	10	0	0	—		—		0	0	24	10
Career total			141	56	2	0	—		—		0	0	143	56

== Honours ==
Victoriano Arenas

- Primera D Metropolitana: 2017–18

Individual

- Primera D Metropolitana Top Goalscorer: 2017–18
