= Franco Benítez (footballer, born 1991) =

Argentine professional footballer

Personal information
- Full name: Franco Daniel Benítez
- Date of birth: 14 June 1991 (age 35)
- Place of birth: Buenos Aires, Argentina
- Position: Midfielder

Team information
- Current team: Excursionistas

Youth career
- Nueva Chicago

Senior career*
Years	Team	Apps	(Gls)
2012–2014	Nueva Chicago	12	(0)
2015	Sacachispas	28	(2)
2016–2018	Deportivo Merlo	78	(6)
2018–2019	Deportivo Español	3	(0)
2019–2020	Deportivo Laferrere	24	(2)
2020–2021	Deportivo Merlo	43	(2)
2022–	Excursionistas	10	(4)
- * Club domestic league appearances and goals as of 08:27, 20 August 2022 (UTC)

Franco Daniel Benítez (born 14 June 1991) is an Argentine professional footballer who plays as a midfielder for Excursionistas.

== Career ==
Benítez started his career with Nueva Chicago. He made one appearance in the 2011–12 Primera B Metropolitana campaign as they won promotion via the play-offs. Benítez was sent off on his Primera B Nacional debut in March 2013 versus Sarmiento, though soon returned to appear nine times as the club suffered relegation back to the third tier. Benítez remained for two more seasons, the first of which ended as title winners, before leaving in 2015 to Sacachispas. Two goals in twenty-eight came in Primera C Metropolitana. January 2016 saw Benítez join Deportivo Merlo. He scored six goals in two years there.

On 17 August 2018, Benítez completed a move to Primera B Metropolitana's Deportivo Español. He didn't appear competitively until May 2019, though would subsequently play two hundred and seventy minutes across fixtures with Justo José de Urquiza, Colegiales and Comunicaciones; as they were relegated to tier four. Benítez spent 2019–20 with Deportivo Laferrere, before moving across Primera C Metropolitana to rejoin Deportivo Merlo in July 2020.

== Career statistics ==
As of 28 August 2020.

Appearances and goals by club, season and competition
Club	Season	League			Cup		League Cup		Continental		Other		Total	
Club	Season	Division	Apps	Goals	Apps	Goals	Apps	Goals	Apps	Goals	Apps	Goals	Apps	Goals
Nueva Chicago	2011–12	Primera B Metropolitana	1	0	0	0	—		—		0	0	1	0
Nueva Chicago	2012–13	Primera B Nacional	9	0	0	0	—		—		0	0	9	0
Nueva Chicago	2013–14	Primera B Metropolitana	2	0	0	0	—		—		0	0	2	0
Nueva Chicago	2014	Primera B Nacional	0	0	0	0	—		—		0	0	0	0
Nueva Chicago	Total		12	0	0	0	—		—		0	0	12	0
Sacachispas	2015	Primera C Metropolitana	28	2	0	0	—		—		0	0	28	2
Deportivo Español	2018–19	Primera B Metropolitana	3	0	0	0	—		—		0	0	3	0
Deportivo Laferrere	2019–20	Primera C Metropolitana	24	2	0	0	—		—		0	0	24	2
Deportivo Merlo	2020–21	Primera C Metropolitana	0	0	0	0	—		—		0	0	0	0
Career total			67	4	0	0	—		—		0	0	67	4

== Honours ==
Nueva Chicago

- Primera B Metropolitana: 2013–14
