= Football in Buenos Aires =

Football is the most popular sport, both in terms of participants and spectators, in the Argentine capital of Buenos Aires. Buenos Aires has one of the highest concentration of football teams of any city in the world (featuring at least 18 professional football teams), with many of its teams playing in the top tier Primera División. This has led to the development of several rivalries within the city, contested as "derbys" when the regular league schedule brings these teams together, such as the Superclásico between Boca Juniors and River Plate – deemed one of the "50 sporting things you must do before you die" by The Observer. Other major clubs include Vélez Sarsfield, Ferro Carril Oeste and Argentinos Juniors.

Diego Maradona, born in Lanús Partido (county), outside of the city of Buenos Aires but in its metropolitan area, is widely considered one of the greatest football players of all time. Maradona started his career with Argentinos Juniors, later playing for Boca Juniors, the Argentina national football team and others (most notably FC Barcelona in Spain and SSC Napoli in Italy).

== Professional Clubs ==
Teams
Club	League	Venue	Neighbourhood	Established (team)
Argentinos Juniors	Primera División	Estadio Diego Armando Maradona (26,000)	La Paternal	1904
Barracas Central	Primera División	Estadio Claudio Chiqui Tapia (4,400)	Barracas	1904
Boca Juniors	Primera División	La Bombonera (57,200)	La Boca	1905
Huracán	Primera División	Estadio Tomás Adolfo Ducó (48,314)	Parque Patricios	1908
River Plate	Primera División	Estadio Monumental Antonio Vespucio Liberti (84,567)	Núñez/Belgrano	1901
San Lorenzo de Almagro	Primera División	Pedro Bidegain (47,964)	Boedo	1908
Vélez Sarsfield	Primera División	José Amalfitani Stadium (49,540)	Liniers	1910
All Boys	Primera B Nacional	Estadio Islas Malvinas (21,500)	Floresta	1913
Atlanta	Primera B Nacional	Estadio Don León Kolbovski (14,000)	Villa Crespo	1904
Defensores de Belgrano	Primera B Nacional	Juan Pasquale (9,000)	Belgrano	1906
Deportivo Riestra	Primera B Nacional	Estadio Guillermo Laza (3000)	Nueva Pompeya & Villa Soldati	1931
Ferro Carril Oeste	Primera B Nacional	Estadio Arquitecto Ricardo Etcheverry (24,442)	Caballito	1904
Nueva Chicago	Primera B Nacional	Estadio Nueva Chicago (28,500)	Mataderos	1911
Club Comunicaciones	Primera B Metropolitana	Estadio Alfredo Ramos (3,500)	Agronomía	1931
Sacachispas	Primera B Metropolitana	Beto Larrosa (7,000)	Villa Soldati	1948
Deportivo Español	Primera C Metropolitana	Nueva España (32,500)	Parque Avellaneda	1956
Excursionistas	Primera C Metropolitana	Excursionistas (7,200)	Belgrano	1910
General Lamadrid	Primera C Metropolitana	Estadio Enrique Sexto (3,500)	Villa Devoto	1950
Sportivo Barracas	Primera D Metropolitana		Barracas	1913

== Honours ==
- Argentina football champion (68)
  - River Plate(36)
  - Boca Juniors(32)

== Buenos Aires derby ==
- Superclásico: River Plate vs. Boca Juniors
- Porteño derby: Huracán vs. San Lorenzo
- Western derby: Ferro Carril Oeste vs. Vélez Sarsfield
- Barraqueño derby: Barracas Central vs. Sportivo Barracas
- Superclásico del Ascenso: All Boys vs. Nueva Chicago
- Clásico del Bajo: Defensores de Belgrano vs. Excursionistas
- Malevo Derby: Deportivo Riestra vs. Sacachispas
- Comu-Lama derby: Comunicaciones vs. General Lamadrid
- Argentinos Juniors vs. Atlanta
- All Boys vs. Atlanta
- Comunicaciones vs. Excursionistas

== Stadiums ==
- Estadio Monumental Antonio Vespucio Liberti: Hosted the 1978 FIFA World Cup Final

== Locations of teams ==
Locations of the 2017–18 Argentine Primera División teams within the city Buenos Aires (excluding metropolitan area).
Locations of the 2017–18 Primera B Nacional teams within the city of Buenos Aires (excluding. metropolitan area).

== Attendances ==
The top-flight football league clubs from the city of Buenos Aires and their average home league attendance in 2025:

#	Club	Average
1	CA River Plate	84,782
2	CA Boca Juniors	52,478
3	San Lorenzo de Almagro	46,349
4	CA Huracán	30,275
5	CA Vélez Sarsfield	24,364
6	AA Argentinos Juniors	16,858
7	Deportivo Riestra	2,916
8	Barracas Central	510
Average per club		32,317

Source: League page on Wikipedia

== See also ==
- Football in Argentina
