= Agustín Occhiato =

Argentine professional footballer

Personal information
- Full name: Agustín Daniel Occhiato
- Date of birth: 8 July 1997 (age 29)
- Place of birth: Villa Luzuriaga, Argentina
- Height: 1.75 m (5 ft 9 in)
- Position: Forward

Youth career
- 2011–2017: Almirante Brown

Senior career*
Years	Team	Apps	(Gls)
2017–2020	Almirante Brown	6	(0)
2020	→ Deportivo Laferrere (loan)	6	(0)
2020–2021	Sambenedettese	0	(0)
2022 -	Liniers	0	(1)
- * Club domestic league appearances and goals as of 20 March 2022

Agustín Daniel Occhiato (born 8 July 1997) is an Argentine professional footballer who plays as a forward.

== Career ==
After progressing through Almirante Brown's youth ranks from 2011, Occhiato was promoted into the senior set-up in the 2017–18 campaign under manager Lorenzo Ojeda. He was selected six times that season, including for his professional debut on 8 October 2017 versus San Miguel. A loan move to Italian Serie C's Potenza fell through in late-2018, which coincided with the forward suffering a cruciate ligament injury. In January 2020, Occhiato was loaned to Primera C Metropolitana side Deportivo Laferrere. Six appearances followed, prior to Occhiato sealing a move to Italy with Sambenedettese.

== Personal life ==
Occhiato is the brother of television presenter Nicolás Occhiato, who participated in and won Bailando 2019.

== Career statistics ==
As of 20 August 2020.

Appearances and goals by club, season and competition
Club	Season	League			Cup		League Cup		Continental		Other		Total	
Club	Season	Division	Apps	Goals	Apps	Goals	Apps	Goals	Apps	Goals	Apps	Goals	Apps	Goals
Almirante Brown	2017–18	Primera B Metropolitana	6	0	0	0	—		—		0	0	6	0
Almirante Brown	2018–19	Primera B Metropolitana	0	0	0	0	—		—		0	0	0	0
Almirante Brown	2019–20	Primera B Metropolitana	0	0	0	0	—		—		0	0	0	0
Almirante Brown	Total		6	0	0	0	—		—		0	0	6	0
Deportivo Laferrere (loan)	2019–20	Primera C Metropolitana	6	0	0	0	—		—		0	0	6	0
Sambenedettese	2020–21	Serie C	0	0	0	0	—		—		0	0	0	0
Career total			12	0	0	0	—		—		0	0	12	0
