= Facundo Talín =

Argentine footballer

Personal information
- Full name: Facundo Talín
- Date of birth: 27 May 1985 (age 41)
- Place of birth: Ezeiza, Argentina
- Height: 1.85 m (6 ft 1 in)
- Position: Centre-back

Youth career
- Nueva Chicago

Senior career*
Years	Team	Apps	(Gls)
2006–2008	Nueva Chicago	32	(1)
2008	CS Pandurii	0	(0)
2008–2009	Râmnicu Vâlcea		
2009–2010	Nueva Chicago	29	(2)
2010	CAI	18	(0)
2011	Tiro Federal	14	(0)
2011–2012	Patronato	13	(0)
2012–2014	Platense	63	(10)
2014–2015	Tristán Suárez	34	(1)
2015	San Miguel	0	(0)
2016	Club Blooming	4	(0)
2016–2017	Almirante Brown	18	(1)
2017	PS Tira	12	(2)
2019	Deportivo Español	10	(0)
2019	Deportivo Laferrere	3	(0)
2020–2021	Ciudad de Bolívar	8	(0)
2022	Vigor Trani	11	(1)
2022–2023	U. S. Mola		
2022–2023	U. C. Bisceglie		
2024	Canosa Calcio		
2025	U. C. Bisceglie		
- * Club domestic league appearances and goals as of 10:17, 10 January 2026 (UTC)

Facundo Talín (born 27 May 1985) is an Argentine footballer who plays as a centre-back. He is currently without a team.

== Career ==
Talín made his professional debut with Nueva Chicago, in 2006 against Chacarita Juniors. He had two stints with the Mataderos club, from 2006 to 2008, playing in both the first and second divisions, and again in the 2009/10 season when Nueva Chicago was in the third division of Argentine football. He played a total of 61 matches for Nueva Chicago, scoring 3 goals.

Between these two spells at Nueva Chicago, he spent a season abroad, specifically in Romania with CS Pandurii, where he did not make any appearances.

After his second spell at Nueva Chicago, he was transferred for half a season to C.A.I., where he played 18 matches and did not score any goals.

In early 2011, he was signed by the Rosario club Tiro Federal, where he played 14 matches.

For the 2011/12 season, he moved to newly promoted Patronato de Entre Ríos, where he played 13 matches and failed to score.

In mid-2012, he joined Club Atlético Platense, where he played for two years. It was at Platense that he best demonstrated his finishing ability, scoring ten goals.

On April 1, 2014, he left Platense after being pressured by the club's hooligans at halftime of a match against Nueva Chicago. Three days earlier, Sebastián Matos and Gonzalo Peralta had also left.

In July 2014, Tristán Suárez signed him to a two-year contract.

In 2015, Talín was featured in a documentary about footballers called Fulboy.

After a brief stint at San Miguel. In January 2016, he transferred to Club Blooming of Bolivia.

He also played for Almirante Brown, PS TNI of Indonesia, Deportivo Español, Deportivo Laferrere, Ciudad Bolívar, and Italian clubs such as Vigor Trani, U. C. Bisceglie, and Canosa Calcio.
