= Pablo Rotchen =

Argentine footballer

Personal information
- Full name: Pablo Oscar Rotchen Suárez
- Date of birth: 23 April 1973 (age 53)
- Place of birth: Buenos Aires, Argentina
- Height: 1.82 m (6 ft 0 in)
- Position: Centre back

Senior career*
Years	Team	Apps	(Gls)
1992–1999	Independiente	186	(4)
1999–2002	RCD Espanyol	65	(5)
2002–2005	Monterrey	102	(4)

International career
1995–1997	Argentina	4	(0)
Medal record
Men's football
Representing Argentina
Pan American Games
Gold medal – first place	1995 Mar del Plata	Team competition
- * Club domestic league appearances and goals as of June 2008

Pablo Oscar Rotchen Suárez (born 23 April 1973 in Buenos Aires) is a retired Argentine football defender who played for the Argentina national team in Copa América 1997.

Rotchen started his professional career playing for Club Atlético Independiente on November 22, 1992, in a 1–0 away win against Boca Juniors in the Bombonera. From there he went on to make over 200 appearances for the club in all competitions.

Rotchen helped Independiente to win the Clausura 1994 championship. They also won the Supercopa Sudamericana in 1994 and 1995 and the Recopa Sudamericana in 1995.

Rotchen joined RCD Espanyol in 1999 and was part of the squad that won the Copa del Rey in 2000.

In 2002, he joined team Monterrey where he was part of the squad that won the Clausura 2003 championship. He retired in 2005.

== Honours ==
Independiente

- Primera División Argentina: Clausura 1994
- Supercopa Sudamericana: 1994, 1995
- Recopa Sudamericana: 1995

Espanyol

- Copa del Rey: 1999–2000

Monterrey

- La Primera División: Clausura 2003
