= Big Five (Argentine football) =

Main five teams of Argentine association football

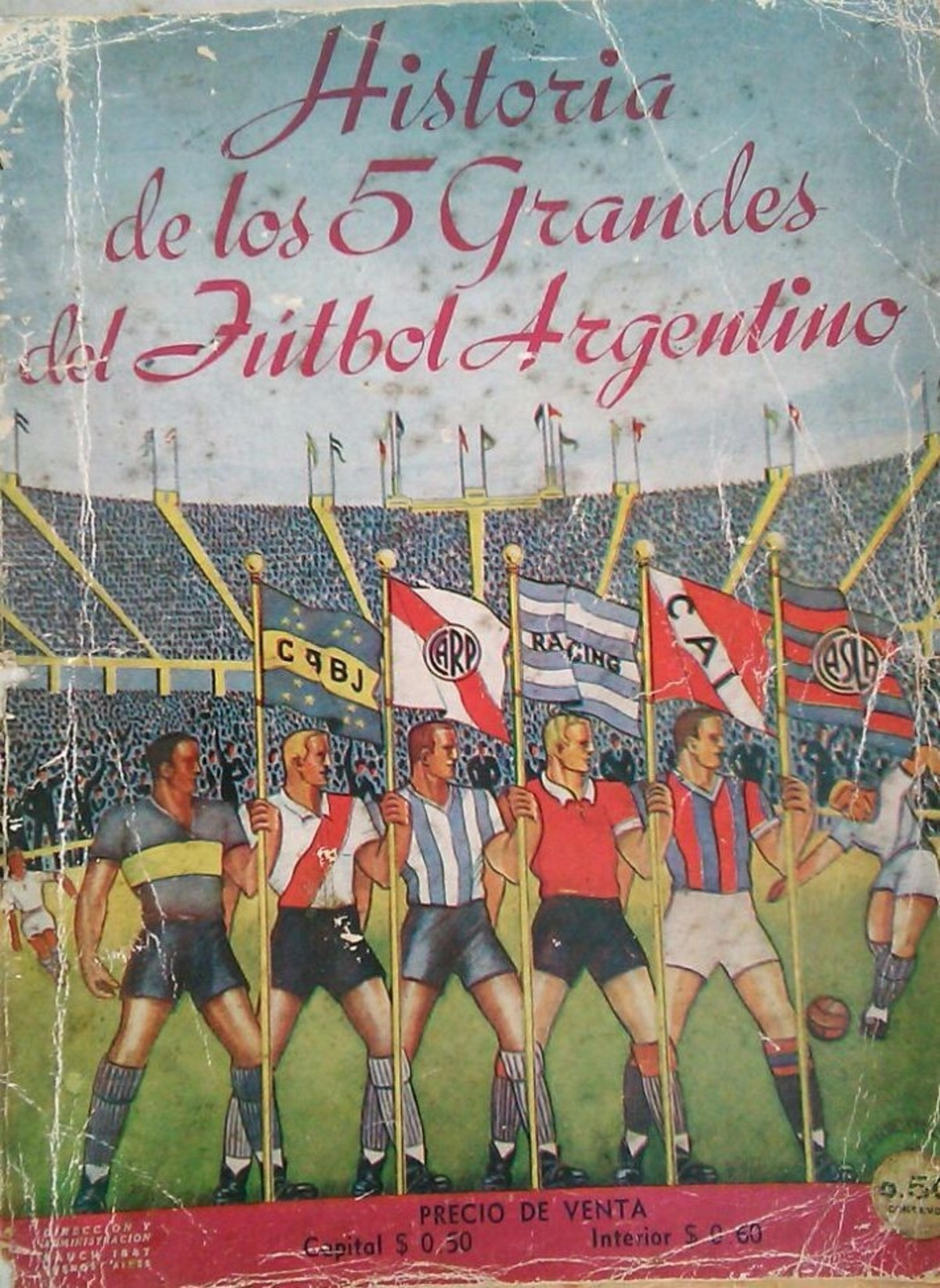
Cover of Historia de los 5 Grandes del Fútbol Argentino, published in 1937, featuring the Big Five, fltr: Boca Juniors, River Plate, Racing, Independiente and San Lorenzo.

In Argentine football, the Big Five (Spanish: Cinco Grandes) refers to the traditional top five clubs: Boca Juniors, Independiente, Racing, River Plate and San Lorenzo.

== History ==
The term was coined on August 4, 1937, when the Argentine Football Association (AFA) arranged a system of proportional representation for the sport clubs involved: the vote of clubs with either 15,000 members and at least 20 years playing the tournament and two or more championship titles would be weighted threefold, the vote of clubs with 20 years and 10,000 to 15,000 members or one championship would be weighted twofold, and the vote of the others would have the standard value. Boca Juniors, Independiente, Racing, River Plate, and San Lorenzo were the only five clubs who qualified for the threefold vote. These five teams have had a leading role in Argentine football since then, and during the first 36 years of the AFA (1931 to 1966) no team outside the five won the championship; the first one to do so was Estudiantes (LP) in 1967. The 1937 decision was officially promulgated on AFA Bulletin n° 286.

The decision brought controversy, with some journalists giving their opinions, such as reads below:

The main five clubs rule football now. Three votes each totalise fifteen, while the representative of Second Division, only one. Therefore they are majority to get anything they want".

— La Cancha magazine, 10 August 1937

"Since a while ago, the big five, joined as a block..."

— El Mundo newspaper, 1 September 1937

In August 1941, the book Historia de los 5 Grandes del Fútbol Argentino, written by anonymous sports journalists, stated "...this was written with no commercial purposes, fulfilling the purpose of bringing unbiased and accurate data to million football supporters, so they can be avoid wrong judgement, constituting a serious testimony of immediate reference to put an end to heated discussions that frequently happens".

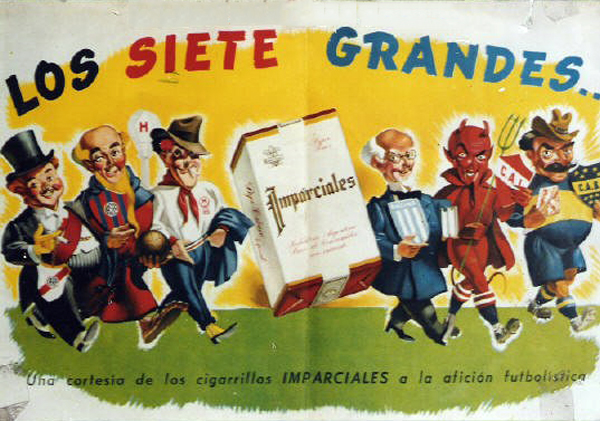
Advertisement by "Cigarrillos Imparciales" featuring "the big seven", c. 1950

The vote was modified every two years. In March 1941, Huracán became the sixth club to have 3 votes. That decision would be reflected a year later, when "Imparciales" cigarettes released an advertisement including Huracán among the big six, with the cigarette brand as "the seventh big".

Other additions came in 1949 when AFA approved requests by La Plata clubs Estudiantes (LP) and Gimnasia y Esgrima (LP) plus Chacarita Juniors, which increased their votes to two, according to AFA Bulletin n° 1443. Nevertheless, some requests were rejected. Newell's Old Boys, Lanús, Platense and Vélez Sarsfield were among them.

The proportional vote remained until January 1955, when an extraordinary assembly ruled that all the representatives will have one vote from then on.

== Overview ==
These five teams are the most popular in Argentina and the only ones that have fans all over the country (not only in specific cities or regions). Boca Juniors (16.1 million supporters), River Plate (13.7 million), Independiente (4.6 million), Racing (4.2 million) and San Lorenzo (3.9 million) hold almost 86% of the fanbase in Argentina (although an important minority of these people are also fans of smaller clubs, usually from a lower division, a phenomenon very common in Argentina), being the biggest and most successful football clubs. The Big Five are also the five most successful clubs in the history of the Argentine Primera División when ranked by the number of Argentine national championship titles won.

The Big Five clubs are all based in Greater Buenos Aires (Boca Juniors, River Plate and San Lorenzo are located in the autonomous city of Buenos Aires, while Independiente and Racing are based in Avellaneda, a city within the adjacent metropolitan area, part of the Buenos Aires Province).

The term is currently used as jargon within Argentine football, rather than with an actual definition and no defined order; sympathizers of other strong teams propose the idea of a Sixth Big.

There are two derbies among the Big Five: the superderby (El Superclásico) between Boca Juniors and River Plate, considered one of the biggest and most important derbies in the world, and the Avellaneda derby between Independiente and Racing, the second-most important in the country and also one of the most important in the world. San Lorenzo's derby is with Huracán, a club which is not considered among the Big Five, but achieved the threefold vote in 1946 and is considered as a mid-sized team.

== See also ==
- Football in Buenos Aires
- Big Twelve (Brazilian football)
- Big Four (Mexico)
