= 1994–95 Argentine Primera División =

Primera División
- Season: 1994–95
- Dates: 1 September 1994 – 26 June 1995
- Champions: Apertura: River Plate (26th. title); Clausura: San Lorenzo (12th. title)
- 1996 Copa Libertadores: River Plate; San Lorenzo
- 1995 Copa CONMEBOL: Gimnasia y Esgrima (LP); Rosario Central

The 1994–95 Argentine Primera División was a season of top-flight professional football in Argentina. The league season had two champions, with River Plate winning the Apertura (26th. league title for the club), while San Lorenzo won the Clausura championship (12th. league title). Gimnasia y Esgrima de Jujuy (as champion of 1993–94 Primera B Nacional) and Talleres de Córdoba (winner of "Torneo Octogonal" after beating Instituto) promoted from the Primera B Nacional (second division).

On the other hand, Deportivo Mandiyú and Talleres (Córdoba) were relegated to Primera B Nacional.

== Torneo Apertura ==
Apertura
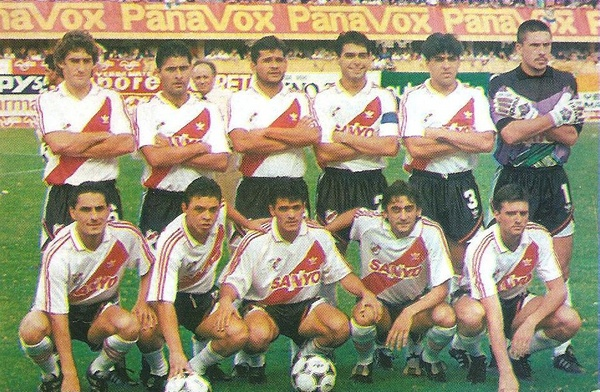
- River Plate, Apertura champions
- Season: 1994
- Dates: 2 September – 19 December
- Champions: River Plate (26th. title)
- Promoted: Gimnasia y Esgrima (J); Talleres (C)
- Top goalscorer: Enzo Francescoli (12 goals)
- Biggest home win: Boca Juniors 5–0 Lanús (15 Dec)
- Biggest away win: Ferro C.O. 1–6 Vélez Sarsfield (17 Nov)

=== League standings ===
Pos	Team	Pld	W	D	L	GF	GA	GD	Pts
1	River Plate	19	12	7	0	31	14	+17	31
2	San Lorenzo	19	9	8	2	30	21	+9	26
3	Vélez Sársfield	19	9	6	4	28	16	+12	24
4	Newell's Old Boys	19	7	9	3	22	14	+8	23
5	Argentinos Juniors	19	8	6	5	24	19	+5	22
6	Belgrano	19	7	7	5	25	18	+7	21
7	Lanús	19	7	7	5	20	24	−4	21
8	Banfield	19	7	6	6	20	15	+5	20
9	Rosario Central	19	7	6	6	22	20	+2	20
10	Gimnasia y Esgrima (LP)	19	5	10	4	20	19	+1	20
11	Independiente	19	7	5	7	29	28	+1	19
12	Racing	19	6	7	6	15	18	−3	19
13	Boca Juniors	19	5	7	7	29	28	+1	17
14	Huracán	19	6	4	9	22	25	−3	16
15	Platense	19	5	6	8	19	24	−5	16
16	Ferro Carril Oeste	19	5	6	8	21	30	−9	16
17	Gimnasia y Esgrima (J)	19	6	3	10	13	24	−11	15
18	Deportivo Español	19	3	6	10	16	26	−10	12
19	Deportivo Mandiyú	19	1	9	9	19	31	−12	11
20	Talleres (C)	19	2	7	10	18	29	−11	9 (Note: 2 points deducted)

=== Top scorers ===
Rank.	Player	Team	Goals
1	(Uruguay) Enzo Francescoli	River Plate	12
2	(Uruguay) Sergio Martínez	Boca Juniors	8
3	(Argentina) Luis Artime	Belgrano (C)	7
3	(Argentina) Omar Asad	Vélez Sársfield	7
3	(Argentina) Iván Gabrich	Newell's Old Boys	7

== Torneo Clausura ==
Clausura
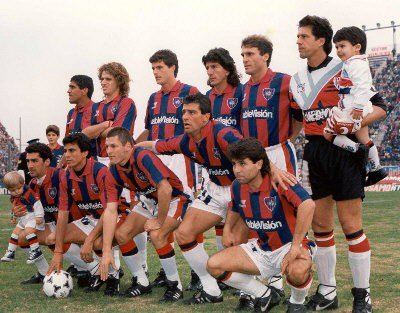
- San Lorenzo, Clausura champions
- Season: 1995
- Dates: 24 February – 26 June 1994
- Champions: San Lorenzo (12th. title)
- Relegated: Deportivo Mandiyú; Talleres (C)
- Top goalscorer: José Flores (14 goals)
- Biggest home win: Boca Juniors 5–0 Independiente (28 May)
- Biggest away win: Huracán 2–5 Rosario Central (21 Apr)

=== League standings ===
Pos	Team	Pld	W	D	L	GF	GA	GD	Pts
1	San Lorenzo	19	14	2	3	31	12	+19	30
2	Gimnasia y Esgrima (LP)	19	12	5	2	29	13	+16	29
3	Vélez Sársfield	19	12	4	3	31	13	+18	28
4	Boca Juniors	19	9	6	4	33	19	+14	24
5	Deportivo Español	19	10	4	5	27	13	+14	24
6	Racing	19	6	8	5	20	19	+1	20
7	Rosario Central	19	5	9	5	29	23	+6	19
8	Platense	19	4	11	4	15	14	+1	19
9	Lanús	19	7	4	8	21	19	+2	18
10	River Plate	19	7	4	8	29	30	−1	18
11	Independiente	19	7	4	8	24	26	−2	18
12	Gimnasia y Esgrima (J)	19	4	9	6	19	23	−4	17
13	Banfield	19	5	6	8	17	22	−5	16
14	Ferro Carril Oeste	19	4	8	7	12	20	−8	16
15	Newell's Old Boys	19	5	5	9	21	27	−6	15
16	Talleres (C)	19	3	9	7	20	29	−9	15
17	Belgrano	19	5	5	9	12	26	−14	15
18	Deportivo Mandiyú	19	3	8	8	18	27	−9	14
19	Huracán	19	3	7	9	20	35	−15	13
20	Argentinos Juniors	19	2	8	9	18	36	−18	12

=== Top scorers ===
Rank.	Player	Team	Goals
1	(Argentina) José Flores	Vélez Sársfield	14
2	(Peru) Hugo Castillo	Deportivo Español	10
2	(Argentina) Darío Scotto	Rosario Central	10
3	(Argentina) Claudio Biaggio	San Lorenzo	9
3	(Uruguay) Sergio Martínez	Boca Juniors	9
3	(Argentina) Javier Mazzoni	Independiente	9

== Relegation ==
Team	Average	Points	Played	1992–93	1993–94	1994-1995
San Lorenzo	1.272	145	114	45	44	56
River Plate	1.228	140	114	46	45	49
Vélez Sársfield	1.211	138	114	48	38	52
Boca Juniors	1.149	131	114	48	42	41
Independiente	1.106	126	114	41	48	37
Gimnasia y Esgrima (LP)	1.053	120	114	34	37	49
Lanús	1.026	117	114	37	41	39
Racing	1.026	117	114	36	42	39
Rosario Central	1.018	116	114	39	38	39
Huracán	1.009	115	114	43	43	29
Banfield	1.000	76	76	N/A	40	36
Belgrano	0.956	109	114	38	35	36
Deportivo Español	0.956	109	114	41	32	36
Ferro Carril Oeste	0.921	105	114	38	35	32
Argentinos Juniors	0.903	103	114	33	36	34
Platense	0.886	101	114	28	38	35
Newell's Old Boys	0.868	99	114	25	36	38
Gimnasia y Esgrima (J)	0.842	32	38	N/A	N/A	32
Deportivo Mandiyú	0.807	92	114	37	30	25
Talleres (C)	0.632	24	38	N/A	N/A	24

== See also ==
- 1994–95 in Argentine football
