= Guillermo Szeszurak =

Argentine footballer

Personal information
- Full name: Guillermo Szeszurak
- Date of birth: October 16, 1971 (age 55)
- Place of birth: Buenos Aires, Argentina
- Position: Striker

Youth career
- –1989: River Plate

Senior career*
Years	Team	Apps	(Gls)
1989–1994	Excursionistas		
1995	Los Andes		
1996–1997	F.C. Felgueiras		
1998–1999	Excursionistas		
2000–2001	Laferrere		
2001–2003	Excursionistas		

Managerial career
- 2008–2010: Club Atlético Atlas
- 2010–2013: Argentino de Quilmes
- 2014–2019: Deportivo Riestra
- 2019–present: El Porvenir
- * Club domestic league appearances and goals

Guillermo Szeszurak (born October 16, 1971, in Buenos Aires) is a former Argentine football player.

Szeszurak joined River Plate. He made his debut in the season 1989/90 for the Excursionistas.

Szeszurak also played for Los Andes, Laferrere in Argentina and F.C. Felgueiras in Portugal.

== Titles ==
- National B: 1994
