= Rodolfo Graieb =

Argentine footballer

Personal information
- Full name: Rodolfo Moises Graieb
- Date of birth: June 8, 1974 (age 52)
- Place of birth: Río Ceballos, Argentina
- Height: 1.75 m (5 ft 9 in)
- Position: Defender

Senior career*
Years	Team	Apps	(Gls)
1994–1997	Talleres de Córdoba	102	(0)
1997–2003	Huracán	211	(1)
2003	Barcelona SC	16	(0)
2004–2009	Lanús	143	(0)
- * Club domestic league appearances and goals as of 09:40, 4 October 2009 (UTC)

Rodolfo Moises Graieb (born 8 June 1974 in Río Ceballos, Córdoba) is an Argentine football defender who is without a club, he most recently played for Club Atlético Lanús in Argentina.

Graieb started his professional career in 1994 with Talleres de Córdoba. In 1997, he moved to Buenos Aires to play for Club Atlético Huracán where he stayed until 2003.

Graieb moved to Ecuador in 2003 where ha played for Barcelona Sporting Club, he returned to Argentina in 2004 to join Lanús. In 2007, he was part of the squad that won the Apertura 2007 tournament, Lanús' first ever top flight league title.

At the end of the 2008-09 season Graieb was released by Lanús.

== Titles ==
Season	Team	Title
Apertura 2007	Lanús	Primera División Argentina
