= 1899 in Argentine football =

Football in Argentina
- Season: 1899

Men's football
- Primera División: Belgrano A.C.
- Segunda División: Banfield

1899 in Argentine football saw the Argentine league reduced to 4 teams to accommodate the creation of a Second Division. Palermo A.C. and United Banks left the Association while Banfield registered to the recently created Segunda División.

Banfield would win the title, becoming the first second division champion ever.

== Primera división ==
The championship Primera división took the format of a league of 4 teams, with each team playing the other twice. Lanús Athletic only completed 2 games, with the other 4 fixtures being awarded to their opponents. The game between Lomas and Lobos was awarded to Lobos.

=== Final standings ===
Pos	Team	Pts	G	W	D	L	Gf	Ga	Gd
1	Belgrano AC	11	6	5	1	0	10	2	+8
2	Lobos	9	6	4	1	1	4	2	+2
3	Lomas AC	3	6	1	1	4	2	8	-6
4	Lanús Athletic	1	6	0	1	5	1	3	-4

== Lower divisions ==
=== Segunda División ===
- Champion: Banfield
