= Matías González (footballer, born 1999) =

Argentine professional footballer

Personal information
- Full name: Matías Tomás González
- Date of birth: 2 July 1999 (age 27)
- Place of birth: Mendoza, Argentina
- Position: Forward

Team information
- Current team: Los Andes

Youth career
- Years: Team
- 2021-2026: Godoy Cruz
- 2022: → Deportivo Maipú
- 2023-2026: → Los Andes

Matías Tomás González (born 2 July 1999) is an Argentine professional footballer who plays as a forward for Los Andes, on loan from Godoy Cruz.

== Career ==
González spent thirteen years in the youth system of Godoy Cruz. He was promoted into the first-team by manager Diego Martínez, with the forward appearing for his senior debut on 14 November 2020 in a Copa de la Liga Profesional home loss to River Plate at the Estadio Malvinas Argentinas.

In February 2022, González joined Deportivo Maipú on a one-year loan deal.

Without a place at Godoy Cruz, he moved to Los Andes in 2023, where he won the Apertura in 2024 and achieved promotion to the Primera Nacional by scoring against Sarmiento de La Banda in the second promotion match.

== Career statistics ==
As of October 2026..

Club	División	Temporada	Liga			Copa Nacionales			Internacional			Otros			Total		
Club	División	Temporada	Part	Goles	Asist	Part	Goles	Asist	Part	Goles	Asist	Part	Goles	Asist	Part	Goles	Asist
Godoy Cruz	Primera División	2021	1	0	0	0	0	0	0	0	0	0	0	0	1	0	0
Godoy Cruz	Primera División	2025	6	0	0	0	0	0	1	0	0	0	0	0	7	0	0
Godoy Cruz	Total club		7	0	0	0	0	0	1	0	0	0	0	0	8	0	0
Deportivo Maipú	Torneo Transición Federal A 2020	2022	24	0	0	0	0	0	0	0	0	0	0	0	24	0	0
Los Andes	Primera B	2023	24	3	3	0	0	0	0	0	0	0	0	0	24	3	3
Los Andes	Primera B	2024	28	1	2	1	0	0	0	0	0	1	1	0	30	2	2
Los Andes	Primera Nacional	2025	15	2	3	0	0	0	0	0	0	0	0	0	15	2	3
Los Andes	Primera Nacional	2026	29	1	2	0	0	0	0	0	0	0	0	0	29	1	2
Los Andes	Total club		81	7	10	1	0	0	0	0	0	1	1	0	98	8	10
Total en su carrera			112	7	10	1	0	0	0	0	0	1	1	0	130	8	10
