= Club Social y Deportivo Liniers =

Argentine association football club

Liniers
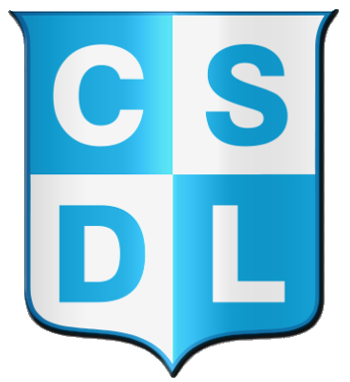
- Full name: Club Social y Deportivo Liniers
- Nickname: La Topadora del Oeste
- Founded: 2 July 1931; 94 years ago
- Ground: Juan Antonio Arias, Villegas, La Matanza Partido, Greater Buenos Aires
- Capacity: 5,000
- Chairman: José Vidal
- Manager: César Monasterio
- League: Primera B Metropolitana
- 2024: Primera B Metropolitana, 13th
Home colours	Away colours

Club Social y Deportivo Liniers is an Argentine football club from the Villegas district of La Matanza Partido, Greater Buenos Aires. The team currently plays in Primera B Metropolitana, the regionalised third division of the Argentine football league system.

== History ==
=== Origins ===
The origins of Liniers go back to its predecessor, the Liniers Sport Club, founded on 7 February 1919 in the Liniers neighborhood. (Note: http://biblioteca.afa.org.ar/libros/libro_30/#page/333) (Note: https://cosasdebarrioweb.com.ar/2022/01/10/cuando-liniers-se-viste-de-celeste) That same year it joined the Asociación Argentina de Football, competing in the Second Division. As a result of the split suffered that year in the Association, it was promoted to the División Intermedia in 1920.

In 1921 it had its peak, when it won the South Zone and played the final for the sixth promotion against Dock Sud, winner of the North Zone, where it fell 3 to 0 in the playoff match. In 1922, it joined the Asociación Amateurs de Football. Incorporated into the División Intermedia, in 1923 it fought again for promotion to the First Division, tying for first place with Liberal Argentino. On 13 January 1924, at Racing ground, it lost 3 to 2 in the tiebreaker. In the following years it continued to have good campaigns, without managing to qualify for the final for promotion.

In 1927 it joined the Asociación Amateurs Argentina de Football and, in the midst of the merger and restructuring of Argentine football, the División Intermedia moved to the third division. That year it reached the runner-up position for the first time, finishing below Unión de Caseros, which obtained promotion. After good performances, in 1931, they finished last in their section, and were relegated to the Segunda División.

Thanks to a restructuring, it was promoted in 1933 to the second level, in Segunda División. In 1934, they finished just 1 point behind the winner and runner-up of their zone. In 1935, they joined the Asociación del Football Argentino and were relegated to the Tercera División, and disaffiliated after the tournament ended.

=== Foundation and merger ===
The club was founded on 2 June 1931 as "Sarmiento". Some time later, it merged with Liniers Sport Club and was renamed "Club Atlético Sportivo Liniers Sud". In 1941 the football team affiliated to the Argentine Football Association.

In its new stage in Argentine football, it achieved third place in the championship.

=== First title ===
In 1942, it managed to equal first place with Estudiantes. On 18 and 25 November, at Ferro and La Bombonera fields, Estudiantes and Liniers triumphed, respectively. Finally, on 2 December at El Gasómetro, Estudiantes won 4-2 and took the championship.

In 1950, the second level was divided into Primera División B and Segunda División, making Tercera División the fourth level. Considered the first Primera D championship, it was won by Liniers, beating Juventud de Bernal 3-1 on the last date, and is promoted to Segunda División for the first time.

With moderate performance, the club managed to remain in the third level for 17 years.

=== Promotion to Primera B ===
In 1966, it once again took centre stage in the championship, now called Primera C, reaching third place.

At the end of the year, the AFA was taken over by the government and, under new leadership, was restructured. In the Primera C 1967, it finished first in its zone and qualified for the Torneo Reclasificatorio of Primera B.

On 10 December, on the last date of the Torneo Reclasificatorio, it tied 0-0 with All Boys and achieved promotion to Primera B.

=== Relegations ===
On 9 March 1968, they made their debut in Primera B, tying 1-1 with Estudiantes. On 13 April, they won their first match, 1-0 against All Boys. Despite the poor performance, they managed to avoid the Reclassification Tournament with Primera C. In 1969, with a similar performance, they managed to avoid the Reclassification Tournament again.

In 1970, they finished last in the championship. In the mini-tournament for the first relegation, they managed to avoid it and went on to play the Reclassification Tournament. On 28 November, they won their last match, 1-0 against Tigre. On 12 December, they lost 6-0 against Talleres for the Reclassification Tournament. On 15 December, forced to win, they lost 4-2 against Argentino de Quilmes and were condemned to relegation. On 19 December, they said goodbye to the tournament, losing 4-3 against Almagro.

Once again in the third level, which had been renamed the Superior Division of Amateur Football, the team continued to decline in 1971. It managed to avoid direct relegation by tying 1-1 with Central Córdoba on the last matchday. On 11 December, it played the playoff, where it lost 3-2 to Leandro N. Alem and was relegated to the fourth level.

=== 70s and 80s ===
In 1972, they managed to return to Primera C, after beating Barracas Central in the triangular playoff of the decagonal Tournament. With a moderate performance, they managed to stay in Primera C until 1978, when they finished last in the championship and were relegated to Primera D.

In Primera D, they stood out in the 1982 tournament, where they qualified for the Final Tournament and fought for promotion until the last date, where the victory of Ituzaingó left them without promotion. In 1984 they managed to qualify for the Reduced Tournament, where they were eliminated in the semi-finals.

In 1986 they managed to win one of the 6 promotions to Primera C, which from 1986/87 onwards was moved to the fourth level. In 1988 they finished second to last in the Average Table and were relegated to Primera D, which had moved to the fifth level.

=== Second title ===
In 1989, they finished second in the Primera D and reached the semi-finals of the Torneo Reducido.

On 23 December 1990, they were crowned champions for the second time in their history, after beating San Martín 2-1 with goals from Schenardi in the penultimate round, and were promoted to Primera C.

=== 90s and 2000s ===
In 1991, they quickly returned to Primera D, finishing second to last in the championship and last in the average table. But in 1993, they managed to return to Primera C, beating San Martín in the Torneo Reducido and achieving their second promotion.

In 1994, after a great performance in the Torneo Clausura, they reached the final of the Torneo Reducido, where they missed out on promotion against Excursionistas due to sporting advantage. In 1998, they reached the final of the Torneo Reducido again, and again missed out on promotion due to sporting advantage against General Lamadrid.

In 2003, they finished last in the championship, while in 2004 they finished last in the championship and in the average table, descending to Primera D.

In 2005, they achieved second place, after losing in the final against Fénix on penalties; while they managed to access the promotion, by beating Defensores Unidos in the final of the Torneo Reducido, but ended up losing in the overall result against San Miguel.

In 2006 they were runners-up again, after winning the Torneo Clausura and losing in the final against Ituzaingó on penalties.

In 2007, they managed to reach the final of the Torneo Reducido, where they fell to Berazategui, leaving them out of the promotion.

=== 2010s ===
In 2010, they qualified for the Promotion, after beating San Martín in the final of the Torneo Reducido. After beating Argentino de Rosario in the overall result, they achieved promotion to Primera C.

On 7 September 2011, they made their debut in the Copa Argentina, falling 3-1 to Argentino de Merlo.

In 2012, they finished last in the championship, and the subsequent poor performance led them to finish last in the average table in 2014, descending to Primera D again.

In 2015, they managed to ascend again to Primera C, by triumphing over Atlas in the final of the Torneo Reducido. But, in 2016, they finished second to last in the championship, and descended by finishing last in the Average Table.

In 2019, they reached the final of the Reduced Tournament, where they lost to Real Pilar.

=== Present ===
On 18 February 2021, they made their debut in the final phase of the Copa Argentina and faced one of the five greats of Argentine football for the first time, San Lorenzo de Almagro, where they lost 3-0. In the Primera D championship, they managed to become champion for the third time in their history, after beating Puerto Nuevo in the final, and were promoted to Primera C.

On 23 October 2023, while Liniers was playing the Torneo Reducido de Primera C for the fourth promotion, the AFA decided to eliminate the third relegation in the Primera Nacional, which was to correspond to a directly affiliated team. (Note: https://tycsports.com/primera-nacional/bombazo-afa-anulo-el-tercer-descenso-de-la-primera-nacional-todos-los-detalles-id543122.html) This measure granted promotion to Liniers, which had finished in fourth place in the championship, because additional promotions had been established in the regulations, so that there would be 22 teams in the Primera B in 2024. After the end of the Torneo Reducido, where they lost in the final, on 12 December, the AFA made an official announcement confirming the promotion of Liniers. In this way, Liniers ascends to Primera B 54 years after its last participation. (Note: https://tntsports.com.ar/ligaprofesional/afa-futbol-argentino-deportivo-liniers-sportivo-italiano-ascenso-primera-b-metropolitana-b-nacional-20231212-0081.html)

== Titles ==
- Primera D: 3

1950, 1989–90, 2021

== Team 2022 ==
Actually 20 March 2022 Note: Flags indicate national team as defined under FIFA eligibility rules; some limited exceptions apply. Players may hold more than one non-FIFA nationality.

No.	Pos.	Nation	Player
1	GK	ARG	Ignacio Díaz
7	MF	ARG	Agustín Occhiato
9	FW	ARG	Franco Méndez
10	MF	ARG	Ignacio Sallaberry
