= Gastón Gerzel =

Argentine footballer (born 2000)

Personal information
- Full name: Pablo Gastón Gerzel
- Date of birth: 5 January 2000 (age 26)
- Place of birth: Resistencia, Argentina
- Height: 1.72 m (5 ft 8 in)
- Position: Winger

Team information
- Current team: FAP
- Number: 10

Youth career
- Sarmiento
- 2010–2020: Boca Juniors

Senior career*
Years	Team	Apps	(Gls)
2020–26	Boca Juniors	0	(0)
2021	→ Platense (loan)	24	(0)
2023	→ Sarmiento (loan)	1	(0)
2024–2025	→ Los Andes (loan)	47	(3)
2026–	→ FAP	12	(2)

International career
2015	Argentina U15		
2016	Argentina U17		
- * Club domestic league appearances and goals as of 14 May 2026

Pablo Gastón Gerzel (born 5 January 2000) is an Argentine professional footballer who plays as a winger for FAP, in the Serbian First League.

== Club career ==
Gerzel played for Sarmiento from the age of four, up until his departure to Boca Juniors in 2010; having impressed at the Torneo Valesanito in Santa Fe; amid interest from Argentinos Juniors. He signed his first pro contract in September 2020, which preceded the winger appearing on Boca's bench five times during November and December; including for Copa Libertadores games with Libertad and Racing Club. On 12 February 2021, Gerzel was loaned to newly promoted Primera División side Platense. He debuted on 21 February against Argentinos Juniors in the Copa de la Liga Profesional; assisting Jorge Pereyra Díaz's winner.

In 2026, after terminating his contract with Boca Juniors due to being deemed surplus to requirements, he joined FAP in the Serbian First League.

== International career ==
In April 2015, Gerzel was called up by the Argentina U15s. October 2016 saw Gerzel receive a call-up from the U17s.

== Personal life ==
In September 2020, it was revealed that Gerzel had tested positive for COVID-19 amid the pandemic.

== Career statistics ==
As of 21 February 2021.

Appearances and goals by club, season and competition
Club	Season	League			Cup		League Cup		Continental		Other		Total	
Club	Season	Division	Apps	Goals	Apps	Goals	Apps	Goals	Apps	Goals	Apps	Goals	Apps	Goals
Boca Juniors	2020–21 (Note: Soccerway counts 2020 Copa de la Liga Profesional appearances as league appearances.)	Primera División	0	0	0	0	0	0	0	0	0	0	0	0
Boca Juniors	2021 (Note: Soccerway counts 2021 Copa de la Liga Profesional appearances as league appearances.)	Primera División	0	0	0	0	—		0	0	0	0	0	0
Boca Juniors	Total		0	0	0	0	0	0	0	0	0	0	0	0
Platense (loan)	2021	Primera División	1	0	0	0	—		—		0	0	1	0
Career total			1	0	0	0	0	0	0	0	0	0	1	0
