= 1994–95 in Argentine football =

Football in Argentina
- Season: 1994–95

The 1994–95 season in Argentine football saw River Plate win the Apertura 1994 and San Lorenzo win the Clausura 1995 tournaments.

== Torneo Apertura ("Opening" Tournament) ==
Position	Team	Points	Played	Won	Drawn	Lost	For	Against	Difference
1	River Plate	31	19	12	7	0	31	14	17
2	San Lorenzo	26	19	9	8	2	30	21	9
3	Vélez Sársfield	24	19	9	6	4	28	16	12
4	Newell's Old Boys	23	19	7	9	3	22	14	8
5	Argentinos Juniors	22	19	8	6	5	24	19	5
6	Belgrano de Córdoba	21	19	7	7	5	25	18	7
7	Lanús	21	19	7	7	5	20	24	-4
8	Banfield	20	19	7	6	6	20	15	5
9	Rosario Central	20	19	7	6	6	22	20	2
10	Gimnasia de La Plata	20	19	5	10	4	20	19	1
11	Independiente	19	19	7	5	7	29	28	1
12	Racing Club	19	19	6	7	6	15	18	-3
13	Boca Juniors	17	19	5	7	7	29	28	1
14	Huracán	16	19	6	4	9	22	25	-3
15	Platense	16	19	5	6	8	19	24	-5
16	Ferro Carril Oeste	16	19	5	6	8	21	30	-9
17	Gimnasia de Jujuy	15	19	6	3	10	13	24	-11
18	Deportivo Español	12	19	3	6	10	16	26	-10
19	Textil Mandiyú	11	19	1	9	9	19	31	-12
20	Talleres de Córdoba	9	19	2	7	10	18	29	-11

=== Top scorer ===
Position	Player	Team	Goals
1	Enzo Francescoli	River Plate	12

== Torneo Clausura ("Closing" Tournament) ==
Position	Team	Points	Played	Won	Drawn	Lost	For	Against	Difference
1	San Lorenzo	30	19	14	2	3	31	12	19
2	Gimnasia de La Plata	29	19	12	5	2	29	13	16
3	Vélez Sársfield	28	19	12	4	3	31	13	18
4	Boca Juniors	24	19	9	6	4	33	19	14
5	Deportivo Español	24	19	10	4	5	27	13	14
6	Racing Club	20	19	6	8	5	20	19	1
7	Rosario Central	19	19	5	9	5	29	23	6
8	Platense	19	19	4	11	4	15	14	1
9	Lanús	18	19	7	4	8	21	19	2
10	River Plate	18	19	7	4	8	29	30	-1
11	Independiente	18	19	7	4	8	24	26	-2
12	Gimnasia de Jujuy	17	19	4	9	6	19	23	-4
13	Banfield	16	19	5	6	8	17	22	-5
14	Ferro Carril Oeste	16	19	4	8	7	12	20	-8
15	Newell's Old Boys	15	19	5	5	9	21	27	-6
16	Talleres de Córdoba	15	19	3	9	7	20	29	-9
17	Belgrano de Córdoba	15	19	5	5	9	12	26	-14
18	Textil Mandiyú	14	19	3	8	8	18	27	-9
19	Huracán	13	19	3	7	9	20	35	-15
20	Argentinos Juniors	12	19	2	8	9	18	36	-18

=== Top Scorers ===
Position	Player	Team	Goals
1	José Oscar Flores	Vélez Sársfield	14
2	Hugo Castillo	Deportivo Español	10
2	Darío Scotto	Rosario Central	10

== Relegation ==
Team	Average	Points	Played	1992-93	1993-94	1994-1995
San Lorenzo	1.272	145	114	45	44	56
River Plate	1.228	140	114	46	45	49
Vélez Sársfield	1.211	138	114	48	38	52
Boca Juniors	1.149	131	114	48	42	41
Independiente	1.106	126	114	41	48	37
Gimnasia de La Plata	1.053	120	114	34	37	49
Lanús	1.026	117	114	37	41	39
Racing Club	1.026	117	114	36	42	39
Rosario Central	1.018	116	114	39	38	39
Huracán	1.009	115	114	43	43	29
Banfield	1.000	76	76	N/A	40	36
Belgrano de Córdoba	0.956	109	114	38	35	36
Deportivo Español	0.956	109	114	41	32	36
Ferro Carril Oeste	0.921	105	114	38	35	32
Argentinos Juniors	0.903	103	114	33	36	34
Platense	0.886	101	114	28	38	35
Newell's Old Boys	0.868	99	114	25	36	38
Gimnasia de Jujuy	0.842	32	38	N/A	N/A	32
Textil Mandiyú	0.807	92	114	37	30	25
Talleres de Córdoba	0.632	24	38	N/A	N/A	24

== Argentine clubs in international competitions ==
Team	Recopa 1994	Supercopa 1994	CONMEBOL 1994	Copa Libertadores 1995
Independiente	Champions	Champions	N/A	Round 2
Boca Juniors	N/A	Runner up	did not qualify	did not qualify
Vélez Sársfield	Runner up	N/A	N/A	QF
River Plate	N/A	QF	N/A	SF
San Lorenzo	N/A	N/A	QF	did not qualify
Estudiantes	N/A	QF	did not qualify	did not qualify
Huracán	N/A	N/A	1st round	did not qualify
Lanús	N/A	N/A	1st round	did not qualify
Argentinos Juniors	N/A	1st round	did not qualify	did not qualify
Racing Club	N/A	1st round	did not qualify	did not qualify
