= Río Ceballos =

- City
- Location of Río Ceballos in Argentina Río Ceballos (Córdoba Province)
- Coordinates: 31°10′S 64°19′W
- Country: Argentina
- Province: Córdoba
- Department: Colón Department

Government
  - Intendant: Ezequiel Lemos
- Elevation: 729 m (2,392 ft)

Population (2010 census)
  - Total: 22,432
- Demonym: rioceballense
- Time zone: UTC−3 (ART)
- CPA base: X5111
- Dialing code: +54 3543
- Climate: Cfb

Río Ceballos is a city and tourist destination in the province of Córdoba located in the center of Argentina. Río Ceballos is located at the foot of the Sierras Chicas, about 30 km north of the provincial capital of Córdoba and is part of the Greater Córdoba area. Río Ceballos is accessed from Córdoba by taking Route E-53 north passing the Airport or by Cordoba City through Villa Allende, Mendiolaza and Unquillo, vía Route E-57. The Natural Hydrologic Reserve "La Quebrada Park" ("Parque La Quebrada") is 7 km beyond Río Ceballos taking the San Martin Avenue till its end.

Río Ceballos had 16,632 inhabitants according to the 2001 census, representing an increase of 29.9% over the population counted for the 1991 census. It has the fourth largest population of cities in the Greater Córdoba area.
