= 1993–94 in Argentine football =

Football in Argentina
- Season: 1993–94

1993–94 in Argentine football saw River Plate win the Apertura championship and Independiente win the Clausura. Vélez Sársfield won their first international title, the 1994 Copa Libertadores and Gimnasia de La Plata won a special one-off Copa Centenario which was played to mark the centenary of the Argentine league system.

== Torneo Apertura ("Opening" Tournament) ==
Position	Team	Points	Played	Won	Drawn	Lost	For	Against	Difference
1	River Plate	24	19	9	6	4	29	17	12
2	Vélez Sársfield	23	19	8	7	4	19	14	5
3	Racing Club	23	19	8	7	4	23	20	3
4	Boca Juniors	22	19	8	6	5	25	12	13
5	Independiente	22	19	7	8	4	27	20	7
6	Lanús	22	19	6	10	3	23	18	5
7	Gimnasia de La Plata	21	19	6	9	4	21	15	6
8	San Lorenzo	21	19	8	5	6	23	20	3
9	Banfield	20	19	6	8	5	20	17	3
10	Ferro Carril Oeste	19	19	4	11	4	17	20	-3
11	Argentinos Juniors	18	19	4	10	5	23	20	3
12	Huracán	18	19	5	8	6	22	23	-1
13	Textil Mandiyú	17	19	5	7	7	25	24	1
14	Platense	17	19	4	9	6	22	24	-2
15	Newell's Old Boys	17	19	4	9	6	16	22	-6
16	Gimnasia y Tiro	16	19	5	6	8	16	25	-9
17	Belgrano de Córdoba	16	19	4	8	7	18	30	-12
18	Rosario Central	15	19	2	11	6	15	24	-9
19	Deportivo Español	15	19	3	9	7	8	20	-12
20	Estudiantes de La Plata	14	19	3	8	8	16	23	-7

=== Top Scorer ===
Position	Player	Team	Goals
1	Sergio Martínez	Boca Juniors	12

=== Relegation ===
There is no relegation after the Apertura. For the relegation results of this tournament see below

== Torneo Clausura ("Closing" Tournament) ==
Position	Team	Points	Played	Won	Drawn	Lost	For	Against	Difference
1	Independiente	26	19	8	10	1	32	13	19
2	Huracán	25	19	10	5	4	25	22	3
3	Rosario Central	23	19	8	7	4	26	14	12
4	San Lorenzo	23	19	8	7	4	22	15	7
5	River Plate	21	19	7	7	5	24	14	10
6	Platense	21	19	7	7	5	28	23	5
7	Boca Juniors	20	19	6	8	5	25	19	6
8	Banfield	20	19	8	4	7	23	20	3
9	Belgrano de Córdoba	19	19	6	7	6	16	17	-1
10	Newell's Old Boys	19	19	7	5	7	16	18	-2
11	Lanús	19	19	6	7	6	23	26	-3
12	Racing Club	19	19	6	7	6	14	17	-3
13	Argentinos Juniors	18	19	3	12	4	23	24	-1
14	Deportivo Español	17	19	3	11	5	13	20	-7
15	Ferro Carril Oeste	16	19	5	6	8	13	17	-4
16	Estudiantes de La Plata	16	19	5	6	8	23	29	-6
17	Gimnasia de La Plata	16	19	5	6	8	20	29	-9
18	Vélez Sársfield	15	19	4	7	8	23	31	-8
19	Gimnasia y Tiro	14	19	4	6	9	15	26	-11
20	Textil Mandiyú	13	19	3	7	9	17	27	-10

=== Top Scorers ===
Position	Player	Team	Goals
1	Hernán Crespo	River Plate	11
1	Marcelo Espina	Platense	11

== Relegation ==
Team	Average	Points	Played	1991–92	1992–93	1993–94
River Plate	1.281	146	114	55	46	45
Boca Juniors	1.228	140	114	50	48	42
Vélez Sársfield	1.175	134	114	48	48	38
Independiente	1.096	125	114	36	41	48
Huracán	1.088	124	114	38	43	43
San Lorenzo	1.079	123	114	34	45	44
Banfield	1.053	40	38	N/A	N/A	40
Deportivo Español	1.035	118	114	45	41	32
Lanús	1.026	78	76	N/A	37	41
Racing Club	1.026	117	114	39	36	42
Gimnasia de La Plata	0.982	112	114	41	34	37
Rosario Central	0.974	111	114	34	39	38
Ferro Carril Oeste	0.965	110	114	37	38	35
Belgrano de Córdoba	0.947	108	114	35	38	35
Platense	0.947	108	114	42	28	38
Newell's Old Boys	0.921	105	114	44	25	36
Argentinos Juniors	0.912	104	114	35	33	36
Textil Mandiyú	0.877	100	114	33	37	30
Estudiantes de La Plata	0.851	97	114	29	38	30
Gimnasia y Tiro	0.789	30	38	N/A	N/A	30

== Argentine clubs in international competitions ==
Team	Supercopa 1993	CONMEBOL 1993	Copa Libertadores 1994
Vélez Sársfield	N/A	N/A	Champions
San Lorenzo	N/A	SF	did not qualify
Estudiantes de La Plata	QF	did not qualify	did not qualify
River Plate	QF	did not qualify	did not qualify
Boca Juniors	Round 1	N/A	Round 1
Huracán	N/A	Round 1	did not qualify
Deportivo Español	N/A	Round 1	did not qualify
Argentinos Juniors	Round 1	did not qualify	did not qualify
Independiente	Round 1	did not qualify	did not qualify
Racing Club	Round 1	did not qualify	did not qualify
