= Estadio de Excursionistas =

Football stadium in Buenos Aires, Argentina

Coordinates: 34.5589°S 58.4430°W

Excursionistas Stadium
- Estadio de Excursionistas
- Coliseo del Bajo Belgrano

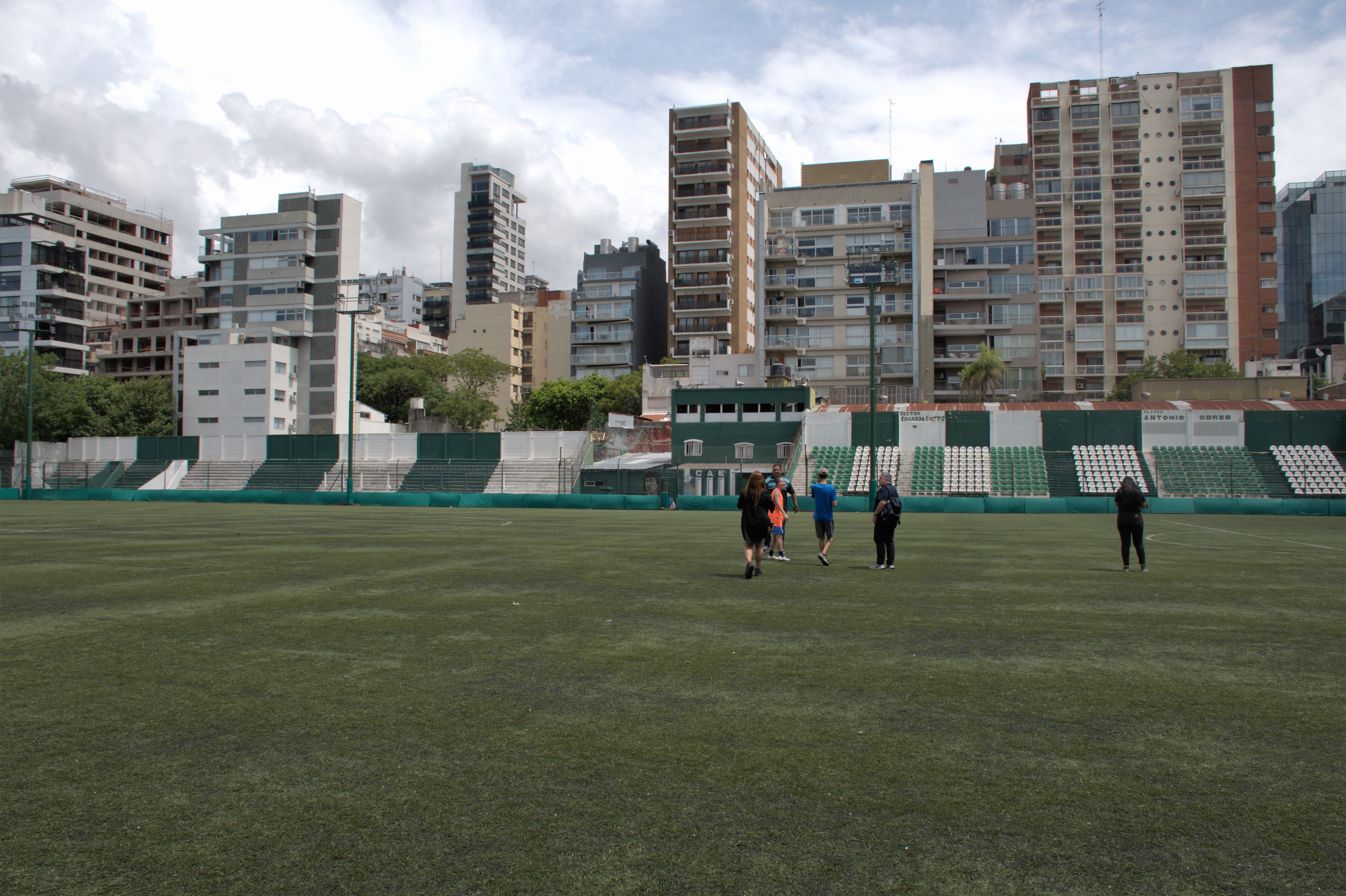
- The stadium in 2023
- Interactive map of Excursionistas Stadium
- Address: La Pampa 1376; Buenos Aires; Argentina
- Owner: CA Excursionistas
- Operator: CA Excursionistas
- Capacity: 8,000
- Type: Stadium
- Surface: Artificial turf
- Field size: 99 x 67 m

Construction
- Opened: 14 April 1912; 114 years ago
- Renovated: 2015

Tenants
- Excursionistas; Excursionistas women's

Website
- excursionistas.org.ar/estadio

The Excursionistas Stadium is a football stadium located in the Belgrano neighborhood of Buenos Aires, Argentina. It is owned and operated by CA Excursionistas. Opened in 1912, is one of the oldest stadiums in the city of Buenos Aires, and the first with artificial turf.

The stadium does not have an official name, and is thus simply referred to as "Estadio de Excursionistas" or colloquially as Pampa y Miñones (due to the street names where it is located), or El Coliseo del Bajo Belgrano.

== Overview ==
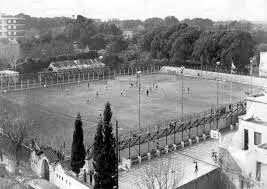
The stadium c. 1920s

The stadium was officially inaugurated on April 14, 1912, on the occasion of a third division ("Tercera de Ascenso") match between Excursionistas and club Libertad. Excursio went on to win the match 4–0. The land where the stadium was built had been acquired after the efforts made by secretary of the club Santos Cameán.

The stadium comprises the full block between streets La Pampa, Miñones, Migueletes and José Hernández. Excursionistas is the only club affiliated to the Argentine Football Association that has never relocated its stadium, making it a unique and historic venue.

The stadium currently has a capacity of 7,200 spectators. In 2014 it underwent significant renovations, including a new artificial turf (the first to be approved by the Argentine Football Association for official competitions), an improved lighting system, new dressing rooms and club and medical facilities. While works were in progress, Excursionistas played their home matches at JJ Urquiza stadium for 18 months. The team returned to their home venue on 23 April 2015. The artificial turf was provided by local company Forbex, and rated two stars (the highest quality according to FIFA certifications).

== Concerts ==
In December 2004, rock band Callejeros performed at Excursionistas Stadium with an attendance of 15,000 people. Only few days later, on December 30, the band played a concert at the club República Cromagnon that ended in a tragedy eventually killing 194 people, mostly due to burnings in the respiratory tract and inhalation of carbon monoxide. The incident remains at the worst tragedy in Argentine music.
