= Club Atlético Excursionistas =

Argentine sports club

Excursionistas
- Full name: Club Atlético Excursionistas
- Nicknames: Excursio; Verde; Villeros; El Nevado
- Founded: 1 February 1910; 116 years ago
- Ground: Estadio de Excursionistas, Belgrano, Buenos Aires, Argentina
- Capacity: 8,000
- Chairman: Javier Méndez Cartier
- Manager: Rodrigo Bilbao
- League: Primera B Metropolitana
- 2021: 7°
- Website: excursionistas.org.ar
Home colours	Away colours	Third colours

Club Atlético Excursionistas is an Argentine sports club based in the Belgrano neighbourhood of Buenos Aires. The club is mainly known for their football team. It currently plays in the Primera B Metropolitana, the third level of the Argentine football league system.

== History ==
=== Foundation ===
Club Atlético Excursionistas was founded on the night of 1 February 1910, at the house located at 3631 Soler Street in the Palermo neighbourhood, where a group of friends used it as a meeting point to go on excursions to the Paraná River and Maciel Island, and where they also held athletic competitions. Local residents Santos Cameán, José Zelada, Raúl Gantes, Luis Ghiano, and Antonio Masciotra created the Club Unión Excursionistas, this name was in use until 1919 where it was changed to the current one; the house would later become the institution's headquarters. Finally, February 1, 1910, would be officially recognized as the date of its founding.

On the initiative of several members, and given the growing popularity of the sport, it was decided to form an association football team. Through contacts made by one of the founding members, several players from the La Nación newspaper team formed the club's first team. It was decided that the colours of the shirt would be green with a horizontal white stripe across the chest: green for the colour of the grass and white for the colour of the tablecloths used at picnics during excursions.

=== Entering the football league ===
In 1911, they played in its first tournament in Argentine Football Association, in the Third Division (the fourth category of football at that time). As they did not have its own pitch, they played its home games at Club Florida, located in the town of the same name, north of Buenos Aires. Before the start of the 1912 tournament, thanks to the secretary and founding member Santos Cameán, they obtained a sports field in an open space in Bajo Belgrano. In 1913, they competed in the Intermediate Division, having been incorporated due to a restructuring, and at the end of the tournament they moved up to the Second Division. It was there that they built its own stadium, which is the current one and the only one the club has had in its history, located on the corner of what are now La Pampa and Miñones streets. Thus, in 1916, participating in the Argentine Football Association, after great performances in 1914 and 1915, they defeated the Sportivo Palermo club 1-0 at the Eureka club's ground, obtaining the runner-up position in the Second Division, which gave it the right to promote its promotion to the Intermediate Division.

They were promoted from the third level of the Argentine Football Association (then called the Second Division) to the second (Intermediate). The club, still called Unión Excursionistas, fielded two teams. One participated in Group C and the other in Group D of the North Zone. Unión Excursionistas in Group C led the table, earning the right to face the winner of Group D, Sportivo Palermo. Thanks to its victory (1-0 at Eureka), they secured promotion. They then lost 4-1 to Huracán (at Estudiantil Porteño), which had won the Group A and B tie. Huracán subsequently beat San Telmo, winner of the South and West tie, and became champion, although they did not gain promotion as they already had representatives in the higher division.

In 1916, the team was promoted to the second division (then named División Intermedia) after defeating Palermo by 1–0.

=== Promotion to the first division: 1920s to 1950s ===
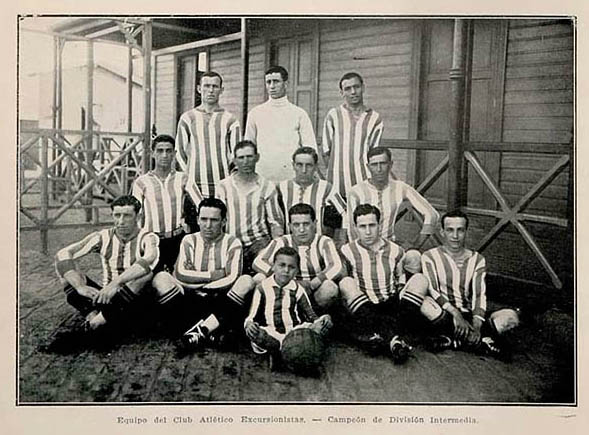
The squad that got promoted to the first division in 1924

In 1924, in the old San Lorenzo de Almagro stadium, Excursionistas defeated Talleres de Remedios de Escalada 2–1, thus proclaiming themselves champion and earning the promotion to Primera División. More than 10,000 spectators attended the match.

In 1931 goalkeeper Fortunato Grimoldi was called up to the Argentina national team. He also appeared on the cover of El Gráfico (the most important sports magazine in Latin America) in 1930.

=== Relegation ===
In 1934 the Argentine Football Association (which Excursionistas was affiliated to) merged with dissident Liga Argentina de Football in a unified league. This restructuring sent Excursionistas to the second division along with many other teams that decided to continue as amateurs. Since then, the club has remained in the lower divisions of Argentine football.

In 1942 Excursionistas finished 2nd after Rosario Central. That team, coached by Pedro Tilhet, is regarded by fans as the best Excursionistas team of all-time. In 1957 Excursionistas had to play a playoff series against Argentino de Quilmes in order to define which team would be relegated to second division. After a 2–2 draw in the first game, Excursionistas achieved a great 6–1 win in the second match, so the team kept its place in Primera División and sent off Argentino to Primera B.

=== 1970–2010 ===
In 1972 Excursionistas was relegated to Primera C, where they remained until 1995 when the team was promoted to Primera B, although they lasted there for just one season. During the 1998–99 season Excursionistas made a great campaign, putting together a 16 match unbeaten streak. The following season (1999–2000), the squad, coached by Néstor Rapa, achieved a historic landmark of 10 consecutive wins, finishing in 1st place and thus earning promotion. Nevertheless, the institution was punished with a 21-point deduction due to the riot caused by a portion of its fans during the match against Club Comunicaciones, in which the fans invaded the pitch and attacked the Comunicaciones players. As a result, Excursionistas missed the opportunity to earn promotion.

In 2001, Excursionistas won the Clausura tournament, although the team was not promoted due to the restructuring of the tournament format. That title only earned Excursionistas the right to play a two-leg semi-final for the right to earn promotion. Their rival on the occasion was Deportivo Laferrere, who proceeded to eliminate Excursionistas. The results were 2-0 for Laferrere in the first leg and 3-2 for Excursionistas in the second, which meant Excursionistas were eliminated on global 4-3.

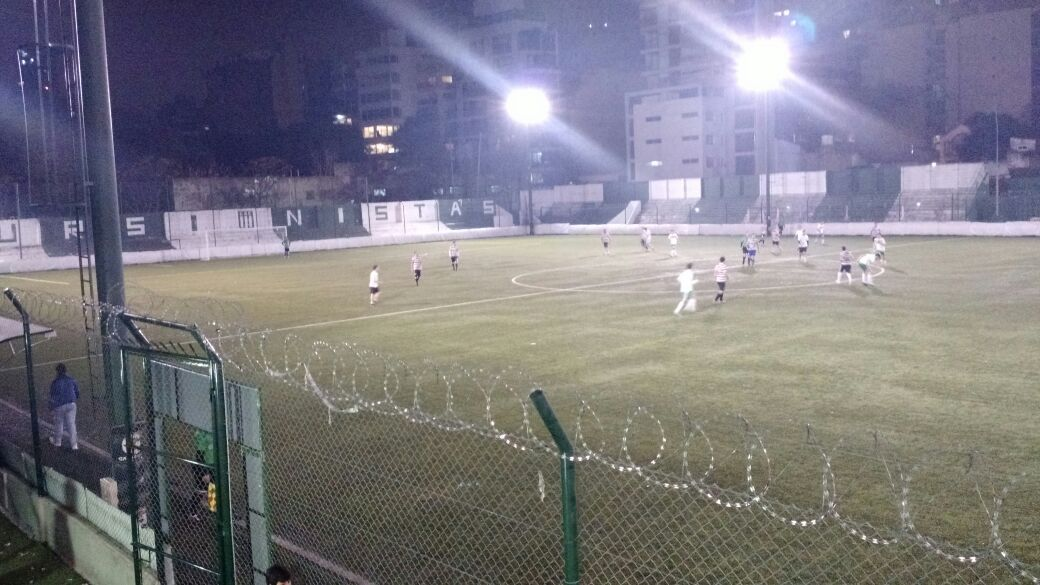
Friendly match at Excursionistas stadium.

=== 2010 onward ===
In the 2010–11 season, Excursionistas finished 8th in the division, thus qualifying for the second phase of the tournament. They then qualified for a subsequent round against Talleres (RE) after winning 3-1 at home and 0-1 away, before being eliminated by Argentino de Merlo due to a 1-2 home defeat and a 0-0 away draw. Excursionistas' defense remained the most invulnerable in the division that season, with only 27 goals scored against in 38 matches.

In the 2016 "Campeonato Transición Primera C," Excursionistas was crowned champion after beating Sacachispas 1-0, thus earning the only spot for promotion to Primera B in the season. The team reached 41 points in the season on a record of 12 victories, 5 draws, 2 defeats, 36 goals for and 24 against. Their standout player for the season was Leonardo Ruiz, who finished the season as top scorer with 16 goals.

== Presidents ==
- 1910–12 Oscar Piñera
- 1913–14 Raúl Gantes
- 1915–16 Eusebio Gorostidi
- 1917–19 Amadeo Aldini
- 1920–26 Julio Ferraris
- 1927 José David
- 1928 Francisco Greco
- 1929–30 Julio Ferraris
- 1931–35 Eusebio Gorostidi
- 1936–43 Armando Policella
- 1944–51 José David
- 1952–53 Pedro Guerra
- 1954 José Giordano
- 1955–56 Dr. Anselmo Bidoglio
- 1957 Dr. Germán Wernicke
- 1958 Antonio Lleira
- 1959–60 Dr. Anselmo Bidoglio
- 1961–63 Luis Martín
- 1964 Rogelio Fortunato
- 1965 –67 Jorge de Santo Monasterio
- 1968 Dr. Anselmo Bidoglio
- 1969–73 Rogelio Fortunato
- 1974–81 Carlos Ianowski
- 1982–85 Dr. Guillermo Black
- 1986–87 Enrique Viva
- 1988–91 Antonio Gorsd
- 1992 Raúl Padró
- 1993–98 Rogelio Pita
- 1998–02 Camilo Scorpaniti
- 2002–10 Armando Mainoli
- 2010 Angel Lozano

== Stadium ==
The Stadium does not have an official name. It is informally known as "El Coliseo del Bajo Belgrano " or "Pampa y Miñones". It has capacity for 8,000 spectators.

== Other Sports ==
=== Academy ===
In the club's academy, children between 5 and 18 years old learn and play representing the club in championships organized by AFA.

=== Futsal ===
The club has a Futsal section. It is affiliated to AFA and plays in the División de Honor.

=== Women's Football ===
The club has a women's football team that is affiliated to AFA, and plays in Campeonato de Fútbol Femenino.

== Honours ==
- Primera B Metropolitana (1): 2026
- División Intermedia (1): 1924 AAm (Note: The "Asociación Amateurs de Football" (AAm) was an amateur league which organized its own championships from 1919 to 1926 when merging with rival Argentine Football Association.)
- Primera C (3): 1926, 2016, 2023
