= Gregorio de Laferrère, Buenos Aires =

City in Argentina

Gregorio de Laferrère
- City

- Location in Greater Buenos Aires
- Coordinates: 34°45′S 58°35′W
- Country: Argentina
- Province: Buenos Aires
- Partido: La Matanza
- Established: May 4, 1911
- Elevation: 4 m (13 ft)

Population (2001 census [INDEC])
  - Total: 175,670
  - Density: 7,059/km^{2} (18,280/sq mi)
- CPA Base: B 1757
- Area code: +54 11
- Website: http://www.laferrere.com/

Gregorio de Laferrère is a city (Spanish: ciudad) in the La Matanza Partido of Buenos Aires Province.

== History and overview ==
The site of cattle ranches and part of the county seat of San Justo from 1858, the city was established as a real estate development on May 4, 1911, by playwright Gregorio de Laferrère, Honorio Luque, and Dr. Pedro Luro. The latter partner, a prominent area physician, had earlier developed what became the Villa Luro section of Buenos Aires. The location was chosen for a station installed by the Buenos Aires and Pacific Railway, and by 1913, the first twenty chalets had been sold. The settlement had, by then, been renamed for Laferrère, who had died that year.

The effects of World War I on the local economy slowed the town's progress, though it resumed with the establishment of the first civic institutions in 1922. The community grew slowly in its initial decades, partly due to recurring flooding from the Río Matanza, east of the town. The growth of manufacturing in the county, mainly around San Justo and other points north of Laferrère, during the 1940s made the town a primary destination for migrants from the underdeveloped north of the country, and thousands of lots were auctioned from 1949 onwards.

The first parish and the first local football club, Deportivo Laferrere, were established in 1956. The new parish priest, Monsignor Leopoldo López May, founded a local institution of higher learning (Instituto Cristo Rey) in 1958. The city had grown to nearly 70,000 inhabitants by 1970, outstripping public road and water and sanitation systems in its outlying areas. Laferrère was declared a city by the Provincial Legislature on September 18, 1973.

It surpassed the county seat, San Justo, in population, and by 1980, with nearly 120,000 people, became the largest municipality in La Matanza County, as well as the fourth-largest in Greater Buenos Aires. Located near the southwestern edge of the metro area, Laferrère remains, with its neighboring communities of Isidro Casanova, González Catán, and Rafael Castillo, among the most economically disadvantaged urban areas in the country, and continues to suffer from inadequate infrastructure.
