= Primera B Metropolitana =

Argentine association football league

- Founded: 1899; 127 years ago
- Country: Argentina
- Confederation: CONMEBOL
- Number of clubs: 22
- Level on pyramid: 3 (1986–present)
- Promotion to: Primera Nacional
- Relegation to: Primera C
- Domestic cup: Copa Argentina
- Current champions: Excursionistas (1st. title) (2026)
- Most championships: Banfield; Ferro Carril Oeste (7 titles each)
- Broadcasters: TyC Sports; DirecTV Sports
- Website: afa.com.ar/primera-b

Primera B Metropolitana, also known as B Metro, is one of two professional leagues that form the third level of the Argentine football league system. The division is made up of 17 clubs mainly from the city of Buenos Aires and its metropolitan area, Greater Buenos Aires.

Originally created as the second division, it became the third level after a restructuring of the system in 1985 that ended with the creation of Primera B Nacional, set as the second division since then.

The other league at level three is the Torneo Federal A, where teams from regional leagues take part.

== Format ==
Primera B Metropolitana is currently organized so, during the course of a season, each club plays the others twice (a double round robin system), once at their home stadium and once at that of their opponents.

The team that gets the most points at the end of the season is recognized as the Primera B champion and is automatically promoted to Primera B Nacional. The teams that hold the second to fifth positions have the chance to enter the Torneo Reducido (small tournament) whose winner will be promoted.

The teams with the 2 lowest aggregate points total in Primera B Metropolitana are relegated to Primera C Metropolitana.

== History ==
Established in 1899, the Primera B Metropolitana (originally named "Segunda División") was the first second division championship in Argentine football. Some of the teams participating were youth or reserve teams of Primera División clubs. Since 1906, a promotion and relegation system was established. Porteño would be the first club to achieve promotion under those rules.

In 1911, the Association created the "División Intermedia" as a second level of Argentine football pyramid, therefore the Segunda División became the third division of the system. Three years later, San Lorenzo de Almagro promoted to Primera División after beating Honor y Patria. Tournaments organised by dissident Asociación Amateurs (AAm) were named "Extra". When both associations, AAmF and AAF merged in 1926, from the 1927 season, the "Primera División Sección B" (predecessor of Primera B) is created and the Segunda División was set as the fourth level (level of youth team), and Intermedia the third.

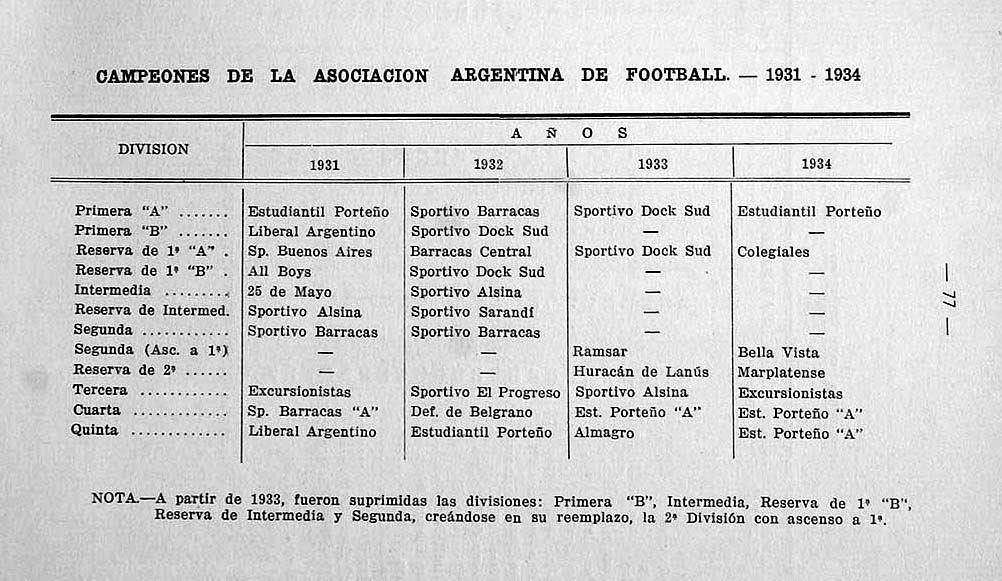
In the first decades of professionalism, some tournaments were called "Primera Amateur" and "Segunda de Ascenso", taking the names of their predecessors: "Primera Division" (AAmF) and "Segunda División con ascenso a 1ª" (from the Biblioteca AFA 1934)

In 1933, the Primera División Sección B and División Intermedia are eliminated and, its participants, become part of the Second Division and Third Division, which are again second and third level.

In 1949, the Primera División B was recreated and was contested by teams from the Segunda Division, which returned to the third level in 1950.

In 1986 the Argentine Association created the Primera B Nacional with the purpose of allowing clubs throughout Argentina to play official competitions. Primera B Nacional became the second division of Argentine football while Primera B was set as the third division, being also renamed "Primera B Metropolitana" due to it was contested by teams from the Buenos Aires metropolitan area (including Greater Buenos Aires).

Primera B Metropolitana has received several names since its inception in 1899 as the second division of Argentine football. The following charts describe the changes made to the division since its creation:

=== Division levels ===
Since its inception in 1899 as "Segunda División", the Primera B Metropolitana has changed levels (between 2 and 3) and names several times. The table below shows them in details:

Year	Level	Promotion to	Relegation to
1899–1910	2	Primera División	(None) (Note: No third division or level existing then.)
1911–1926	3	Intermedia	Tercera División
1927–1985	2	Primera División	Tercera División
1986–present	3	Primera Nacional	Primera C

== Current clubs (2026) ==
Club	City/Neighborhood	Area	Stadium
Argentino	Merlo	Greater Buenos Aires	Argentino de Merlo
Argentino de Quilmes	Quilmes	Greater Buenos Aires	Argentino de Quilmes
Arsenal	Sarandí	Greater Buenos Aires	Julio Grondona
Brown	Adrogué	Greater Buenos Aires	Lorenzo Arandilla
Comunicaciones	Agronomía	City of Buenos Aires	Alfredo Ramos
Defensores Unidos	Zárate	Buenos Aires Province	Gigante de Villa Fox
Deportivo Armenio	Ingeniero Maschwitz	Buenos Aires Province	República de Armenia
Deportivo Laferrere	Laferrere	Greater Buenos Aires	José Luis Sánchez
Deportivo Merlo	Merlo	Greater Buenos Aires	José Manuel Moreno
Dock Sud	Dock Sud	Greater Buenos Aires	de los Inmigrantes
Excursionistas	Belgrano	City of Buenos Aires	Estadio Excursionistas
Fénix	Pilar	Buenos Aires Province	(none)
Ferrocarril Midland	Libertad	Greater Buenos Aires	Ferrocarril Midland
Flandria	Jáuregui	Buenos Aires Province	Carlos V
Liniers	Gral. Villegas	Greater Buenos Airee	Juan Antonio Arias
Real Pilar	Pilar	Buenos Aires Province	Carlos Barraza
Sacachispas	Villa Soldati	City of Buenos Aires	Beto Larossa
San Martín (B)	Burzaco	Greater Buenos Aires	Francisco Boga
Sportivo Italiano	Ciudad Evita	Greater Buenos Aires	República de Italia
UAI Urquiza	Villa Lynch	Greater Buenos Aires	Monumental de Villa Lynch
Villa Dálmine	Campana	Buenos Aires Province	El Coliseo
Villa San Carlos	Berisso	Greater Buenos Aires	Genacio Sálice

== List of champions ==
The tournament has received different names since its first edition in 1899, such as "Segunda División" (1899–1926), "Primera División B" (or simply "Primera B", since 1927).

After the restructuring of the Argentine football league system in 1985, the tournament became the third division, changing its name to "Primera B Metropolitana" to set a difference with Primera B Nacional.

Ed.	Season	Champion	Runner-up
Segunda División
As Second Division tournament
1	1899	Banfield (1)	English High School (Note: Then renamed "Alumni AC", in 1901.)
2	1900	Banfield (2)	English High School II (Note: As the senior team was competing in Primera División, the club played the second division with reserve teams.)
3	1901	Barracas A.C. (1)	Belgrano A.C. II
4	1902	Belgrano A.C. II (1)	Estudiantes (BA)
5	1903	Barracas A.C. II (2)	Estudiantes (BA)
6	1904	Barracas A.C. II (3)	Alumni II
7	1905	América (1)	Belgrano A.C.
8	1906	Estudiantes (BA) (1)	Estudiantil Porteño
9	1907	Nacional (Floresta) (1)	River Plate
10	1908	River Plate (1)	Racing
11	1909	Gimnasia y Esgrima (BA) (1)	San Isidro
12	1910	Racing (1)	Boca Juniors
As Third Division tournament (Note: In those years, the second level was División Intermedia.)
13	1911	Riachuelo (1)	Olivos
14	1912	Banfield (3)	
14	1912 FAF (Note: The Federación Argentina de Football (FAF) was a rival association that organized its own championships from 1912 to 1914.)	Tigre (1)	Vélez Sarsfield
15	1913	Ferro Carril Oeste (1)	
15	1913 FAF	Estudiantes (LP) (1)	
16	1914	San Lorenzo (1)	Germinal
16	1914 FAF	Tigre (1)	
17	1915	Martínez (1)	
18	1916	Huracán (1)	San Telmo
19	1917	Sportivo Palermo (1)	Almagro
20	1918	San Fernando (1)	Del Plata
21	1919	El Porvenir (1)	
21	1919 AAm (Note: The Asociación Amateurs de Football (Aam) was a rival association that organized its own championships from 1919 to 1926.)	Sportivo Barracas (1)	
22	1920	Sportivo Avellaneda (1)	
22	1920 AAm	Oriente del Sud (1)	
23	1921	Huracán (2)	
23	1921 AAm	Villa Crespo (1)	Rañó
24	1922	Central Argentino (1)	
24	1922 AAm	Nacional (Adrogué) (1)	
25	1923	Bristol (1)	
25	1923 AAm	Acassuso (1)	
26	1924	Leandro N. Alem (1)	
26	1924 AAm	Racing (2)	
27	1925	Sportivo Balcarce (1)	
27	1925 AAm	Perla del Plata (1)	Sportivo Palermo
28	1926	Libertad (1)	Mariano Moreno
28	1926 AAm	Racing (3)	Villa Fischer
Primera B
As Second Division tournament
29	1927	El Porvenir (1)	Argentino (B)
30	1928	Colegiales (1)	Temperley
31	1929	Honor y Patria (1)	Porteño
32	1930	Nueva Chicago (1)	All Boys
33	1931	Liberal Argentino (1)	All Boys
33	1931 LAF (Note: The Liga Argentina de Football (LAF) was a dissident professional association that organized its own championships from 1931 to 1934, when it merged the official body (AFA).)	(Not held)	
34	1932	Dock Sud (1)	Sportivo Balcarce
34	1932 LAF	(Not held)	
Segunda División
35	1933	Ramsar (1)	25 de Mayo
35	1933 LAF	(Not held)	
36	1934	Bella Vista (1)	Los Andes
36	1934 LAF	River Plate II (2)	San Lorenzo II
37	1935	Estudiantes (LP) II (2)	Independiente II
38	1936	Boca Juniors II (1)	San Lorenzo II
39	1937	Almagro (1)	Excursionistas
40	1938	Argentino (Q) (1)	Quilmes
41	1939	Banfield (4)	All Boys
42	1940	Argentinos Juniors (1)	Acasusso
43	1941	Chacarita Juniors (1)	Colegiales
44	1942	Rosario Central (1)	Excursionistas
45	1943	Vélez Sarsfield (1)	Unión
46	1944	Gimnasia y Esgrima (LP) (1)	Tigre
47	1945	Tigre (3)	Argentino (R)
48	1946	Banfield (5)	Gimnasia y Esgrima (LP)
49	1947	Gimnasia y Esgrima (LP) (2)	Quilmes
50	1948	(Abandoned because of a players strike) (Note: The tournament began in April and ran until December, when it was cancelled by the AFA after a players strike. An annual assembly decided Atlanta and Ferro C.O. were promoted to Primera División.)	
Primera División B (Note: Some referred to this era with several names, with few variations.)
51	1949	Quilmes (1)	Colón
52	1950	Lanús (1)	Colón
53	1951	Rosario Central (2)	Colón
54	1952	Gimnasia y Esgrima (LP) (3)	Tigre
55	1953	Tigre (4)	Atlanta
56	1954	Estudiantes (LP) (3)	Argentinos Juniors
57	1955	Argentinos Juniors (2)	Unión
58	1956	Atlanta (1)	Central Córdoba (R)
59	1957	Central Córdoba (R) (1)	Platense
60	1958	Ferro Carril Oeste (2)	Nueva Chicago
61	1959	Chacarita Juniors (2)	Quilmes
62	1960	Los Andes (1)	Tigre
63	1961	Quilmes (2)	Banfield
64	1962	Banfield (6)	Platense
65	1963	Ferro Carril Oeste (3)	Sarmiento (J)
66	1964	Lanús (2)	Platense
67	1965	Colón (1)	Quilmes
68	1966	Unión (1)	Argentino (Q)
69	1967	Defensores de Belgrano (1)	Tigre
70	1968	Almagro (1)	Nueva Chicago
71	1969	Ferro Carril Oeste (4) (Note: Ferro C.O. won the tournament but could not promote to Primera División after they lost in the Reclasificatorio tournament.)	San Telmo
72	1970	Ferro Carril Oeste (5)	Almirante Brown
73	1971	Lanús (3)	Arsenal
74	1972	All Boys (1)	Almirante Brown
75	1973	Banfield (7)	Temperley
76	1974	Temperley (1)	Unión
77	1975	Quilmes (3)	San Telmo
78	1976 I (Note: In 1976 two tournaments were disputed, proclaiming one champion each. Both titles were official.)	Platense (1)	Lanús
78	1976 II	Lanús (4)	Almirante Brown
79	1977	Estudiantes (BA) (2)	Los Andes
80	1978	Ferro Carril Oeste (6)	Almirante Brown
81	1979	Tigre (5)	Sportivo Italiano
82	1980	Sarmiento (J) (1)	Atlanta
83	1981	Nueva Chicago (2)	Quilmes
84	1982	San Lorenzo (2)	Atlanta
85	1983	Atlanta (2)	Chacarita Juniors
86	1984	Deportivo Español (1)	Defensores de Belgrano
87	1985	Rosario Central (3)	San Miguel
Primera B Metropolitana (Note: Became the third level when Primera B Nacional was created as the second division of Argentine football league system.)
As Third Division tournament
88	1986–87	Quilmes (4)	Almirante Brown
89	1987–88	Talleres (RE) (2)	Almagro
90	1988–89	Villa Dálmine (1)	Argentino (R)
91	1989–90	Deportivo Morón (1)	Atlanta
92	1990–91	Central Córdoba	Almagro
93	1991–92	Ituzaingó	Los Andes
94	1992–93	All Boys (2)	Sarmiento (J)
95	1993–94	Chacarita Juniors (3)	Los Andes
96	1994–95	Atlanta	Tigre
97	1995–96	Sportivo Italiano	Estudiantes (BA)
98	1996–97	Defensa y Justicia	San Miguel
99	1997–98	El Porvenir (2)	Tigre
100	1998–99	Argentino (R) (1)	Temperley
101	1999–00	Estudiantes (BA) (3)	Sarmiento (J)
102	2000–01	Defensores de Belgrano (2)	Temperley
103	2001–02	Deportivo Español (2)	Ferro Carril Oeste
104	2002–03	Ferro Carril Oeste (7)	All Boys
105	2003–04	Sarmiento (J) (2)	Atlanta
106	2004–05	Tigre (6)	Platense
107	2005–06	Platense (2)	Deportivo Morón
108	2006–07	Almirante Brown (1)	Estudiantes (BA)
109	2007–08	All Boys	Los Andes
110	2008–09	Sportivo Italiano (2)	Deportivo Merlo
111	2009–10	Almirante Brown (2)	Sarmiento
112	2010–11	Atlanta (3)	Estudiantes (BA)
113	2011–12	Sarmiento (J) (3)	Nueva Chicago
114	2012–13	Villa San Carlos (1)	Platense
115	2013–14	Nueva Chicago (3)	Temperley
116	2014	(no champion crowned) (Note: Teams were divided into two groups, with the best placed of each zone (Chacarita Juniors and Los Andes) directly promoting to Primera B Nacional.)	–
117	2015	Brown (A) (1)	Estudiantes (BA)
118	2016	Flandria (1)	Atlanta
119	2016–17	Deportivo Morón (2)	Deportivo Riestra
120	2017–18	Platense (3)	Estudiantes (BA)
121	2018–19	Barracas Central (1)	Atlanta
122	2019–20	(Abandoned because of the COVID-19 pandemic) (Note: On 28 April 2020 and after eight rounds played, the AFA decided to abandon the competition and declare the season finished. All other official competitions had been suspended on 17 March.)	
123	2020	Almirante Brown (3)	J. J. de Urquiza
124	2021	Flandria (2)	Colegiales
125	2022	Defensores Unidos (1)	Villa San Carlos
126	2023	Talleres (RE) (3)	San Miguel
127	2024	Colegiales (2)	Los Andes
128	2025	Ferrocarril Midland (1)	Real Pilar
129	2026	Excursionistas (1)	Arsenal

== Titles by club ==
This list include all the titles won with both, senior and reserve teams.

Club	Titles	Winning years
Banfield	7	1899, 1900, 1912, 1939, 1946, 1962, 1973
Ferro Carril Oeste	7	1913, 1958, 1963, 1969, 1970, 1978, 2002–03
Tigre	6	1912 FAF, 1914, 1945, 1953, 1979, 2004–05
Quilmes	4	1949, 1961, 1975, 1986–87
Lanús	4	1950, 1964, 1971, 1976
Barracas A.C.	3	1901, 1903, 1904
Estudiantes (BA)	3	1906, 1977, 1999–2000
Racing	3	1910, 1924 AAm, 1926 AAm
Estudiantes (LP)	3	1913 FAF, 1935, 1954
Nueva Chicago	3	1930, 1981, 2013–14
Chacarita Juniors	3	1941, 1959, 1993–94
Atlanta	3	1956, 1983, 2010–11
Gimnasia y Esgrima (LP)	3	1944, 1947, 1952
All Boys	3	1972, 1992–93, 2007–08
Rosario Central	3	1942, 1951, 1985
Platense	3	1976, 2005–06, 2017–18
Sarmiento (J)	3	1980, 2003–04, 2011–12
Almirante Brown	3	2006–07, 2009–10, 2020
Talleres (RE)	3	1925 AAm, 1987–88, 2023
River Plate	2	1908, 1934 LAF
El Porvenir	2	1927, 1997–98
Defensores de Belgrano	2	1967, 2000–01
San Lorenzo	2	1914, 1982
Huracán	2	1916, 1921
Racing	3	1910, 1924 AAm, 1926 AAm
Almagro	2	1937, 1968
Argentinos Juniors	2	1940, 1955
Central Córdoba (R)	2	1957, 1990–91
Deportivo Español	2	1984, 2001–02
Deportivo Morón	2	1989–90, 2016–17
Flandria	2	2016, 2021
Colegiales	2	1928, 2024
Belgrano A.C.	1	1902
Gimnasia y Esgrima (BA)	1	1909
Floresta	1	1913 FAF
Tigre Juniors	1	1914 FAF
Sportivo Palermo	1	1917
San Fernando	1	1918
Sportivo Barracas	1	1919 AAm
Sportivo Balcarce	1	1925
Perla del Plata	1	1925 AAm
Honor y Patria	1	1929
Ramsar	1	1933
Bella Vista	1	1934
Argentino (Q)	1	1938
Vélez Sarsfield	1	1943
Los Andes	1	1960
Colón	1	1965
Unión	1	1966
Temperley	1	1974
Liberal Argentino	1	1931
Dock Sud	1	1932
Boca Juniors	1	1936
Villa Dálmine	1	1988–89
Argentino (R)	1	1998–99
Sportivo Italiano	1	2008–09
Villa San Carlos	1	2012–13
Brown (A)	1	2015
Barracas Central	1	2018–19
Defensores Unidos	1	2022
Ferrocarril Midland	1	2025
Excursionistas	1	2026
