= Deportivo Laferrere =

Argentine association football club

Laferrere
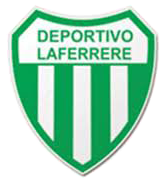
- Full name: Club Deportivo Laferrere
- Nicknames: Los Villeros; Lafe
- Founded: 9 July 1956; 69 years ago
- Ground: Estadio José Luis Sánchez, Laferrere, La Matanza Partido
- Capacity: 9,000
- Chairman: Gabriel Aranda
- Manager: Guillermo Szeszurak
- League: Primera B
- 2023: 3° (Promoted)
- Website: http://www.deportivolaferrere.org/site/
| Home colours | Away colours |

Club Deportivo Laferrere is a football club from the homonymous district of La Matanza Partido, Greater Buenos Aires. The team currently plays in Primera B, the regionalized third division of the Argentine football league system.

Laferrere was founded in 1956, and registered with AFA in 1978. The team has spent most of its time playing in the third and fourth divisions. Nevertheless, Laferrere had a brief spell in the Primera B Nacional (the second division) between 1990 and 1995. Its best league position to date was 15th in the 2nd division, which it achieved in 1991 and 1993.

== Current squad ==
As of 22 September 2019

Note: Flags indicate national team as defined under FIFA eligibility rules; some limited exceptions apply. Players may hold more than one non-FIFA nationality.

| No. | Pos. | Nation | Player |
|---|---|---|---|
| — | GK | ARG | Sebastián Blázquez |
| — | GK | ARG | Cristian Moyano |
| — | DF | ARG | Juan Azil |
| — | DF | ARG | José Barreal |
| — | DF | ARG | Ariel Cafferatta |
| — | DF | ARG | Juan Ferreira |
| — | DF | ARG | Santiago López |
| — | DF | ARG | Sebastián Pérez |
| — | DF | ARG | Diego Sequeira |
| — | DF | ARG | Facundo Talín |
| — | MF | ARG | Germán Basualdo |
| — | MF | ARG | Franco Benítez |
| — | MF | ARG | Diego Brizuela |

| No. | Pos. | Nation | Player |
|---|---|---|---|
| — | MF | ARG | Leandro Coronel |
| — | MF | ARG | Walter Godoy |
| — | MF | ARG | Maximiliano Mallemaci |
| — | MF | ARG | David Orellana |
| — | MF | ARG | Néstor Pintos |
| — | MF | ARG | Lucas Robledo |
| — | MF | ARG | Lucas Scarnatto |
| — | MF | ARG | Braian Valdez |
| — | FW | ARG | Oscar Acuña |
| — | FW | ARG | Marcelo Bechen |
| — | FW | ARG | Rodrigo Faust |
| — | FW | ARG | Vicente Méndez |

== Titles ==
- Primera C (2): 1986–87, 2001–02
