= Fernando Espinoza (politician) =

Argentine politician (born 1968)

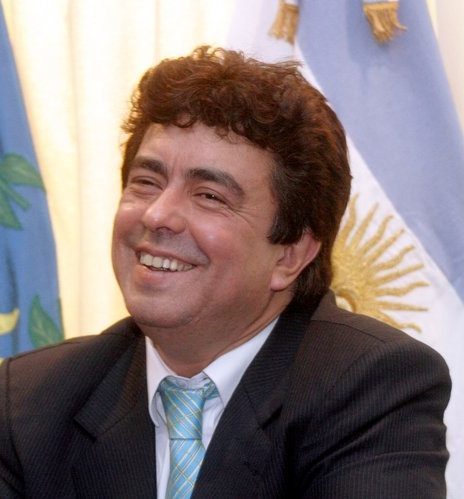

Mayor of La Matanza
- Incumbent
- Assumed office 11 December 2019
- Preceded by: Verónica Magario
- In office 10 December 2005 – 12 December 2015
- Preceded by: Alberto Balestrini
- Succeeded by: Verónica Magario

National Deputy
- In office 10 December 2017 – 10 December 2019
- Constituency: Buenos Aires

Personal details
- Born: 30 December 1968 (age 57) Ramos Mejia, Argentina
- Party: Justicialist Party

Fernando Espinoza (born 30 December 1968) is a politician from Argentina, and is the current intendente (mayor) of La Matanza.

== Political career ==
Fernando Espinoza studied in the Jorge Newbery college from San Justo, where he was part of the student center of the institution while he was studying for his high-school degree. After graduating, he entered the Juventud Peronista (Peronist Youth) and the Movimiento de Unidad, Solidaridad y Organización (MUSO). There, he met Alberto Balestrini, who became his political mentor. In 1995 he became a secretary in the Juventud Peronista in the Consejo del Partido Justicialista (Justicialist Party Council) in the district of La Matanza. On 24 October 1999 he was elected as councillor from the party, and chosen by his peers as the president of the Honorable Concejo Deliberante (part of the legislature), a position he would hold from 2002 to 2003, and then again, after being re-elected from 2003 to 2005.

In the year 2005 he abandoned the legislative position and appointed as the Intendente of La Matanza, after Ballestrini was elected as the head of the Cámara de Diputados de La Nación. He was sworn in at the San Justo Cathedral by recognizing himself as a devotee of Nuestra Señora del Buen Viaje. In the elections for the national executive held on 28 October 2007, he declared himself again as candidate for the city mayor, winning the election with over 50% of the votes. Espinoza was re-elected as a mayor in the elections held in 2011, with more than 60% of the votes of the citizens, becoming the incumbent mayor.

=== Mayorship of La Matanza ===
The government of Espinoza as mayor of La Matanza was marked by the start of a decentralization policy, dividing the territory in communes. He also founded the Centro de Operaciones Municipales (COM) (District Operations Center) and the Local Patrol in response to a growing request from the population for security improvements. During his administration a local book fair, along with music festivals and artistic events, have been held in the city. In the health policy, three new hospitals were built between 2005 and 2013.

== Recognition ==
In 2008 he won the Public Service Award, in the category "poverty reduction" by his programs towards the social inclusion. In September 2009, as part of a charity dinner held once a year by the Obra del Padre Mario Pantaleo, Espinoza got the Solidarity Hand for his "Work for the wealth of the community".

== Legal Issues ==
In May 2024, three years after being denounced by a former private secretary for sexual abuse, he was indicted for simple sexual abuse and non-compliance with the court. The judge in charge of the case ordered an embargo of $1.500.000 argentine pesos and a restraining order against Espinoza that prohibited him from approaching his accuser.

== Electoral history ==
=== Executive ===
Electoral history of Fernando Espinoza
Election	Office	List	Votes			Result	Ref.
Election	Office	List	Total	%	P.	Result	Ref.
2007	Mayor of La Matanza	Front for Victory	266.903	50.06%	1st	Elected	
2011	Mayor of La Matanza	Front for Victory	392.535	60.56%	1st	Elected	
2019	Mayor of La Matanza	Frente de Todos	531,031	64.18%	1st	Elected	
2023	Mayor of La Matanza	Union For the Homeland	418.256	53.73%	1st	Elected	

=== Legislative ===
Electoral history of Fernando Espinoza
Election	Office	List	#	District	Votes			Result	Ref.
Election	Office	List	#	District	Total	%	P.	Result	Ref.
1999	Councillor	Justicialist Concertation	2	La Matanza Partido	218,402	41.12%	1st (Note: Presented on an electoral list. The data shown represents the share of the vote the entire party/alliance received in that constituency.)	Elected	
2003	Councillor	Justicialist Party	1	La Matanza Partido	219,281	46.60%	1st	Elected	
2017	National Deputy	Unidad Ciudadana	3	Buenos Aires Province	3,383,114	36.28%	2nd	Elected	
