= Verónica Magario =

Argentine politician (born 1969)

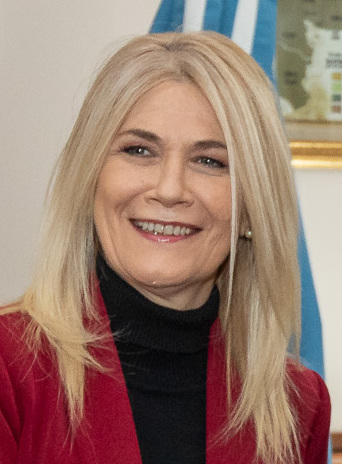

Vice Governor of Buenos Aires
- Incumbent
- Assumed office 10 December 2019
- Governor: Axel Kicillof
- Preceded by: Daniel Salvador

Mayor of La Matanza
- In office 12 December 2015 – 11 December 2019
- Preceded by: Fernando Espinoza
- Succeeded by: Fernando Espinoza

National Deputy
- In office 10 December 2013 – 10 December 2015
- Constituency: Buenos Aires

Personal details
- Born: Verónica María Magario; 26 May 1969 (age 57) Santa Fe, Argentina
- Party: Justicialist Party
- Other political affiliations: Front for Victory (2005–2017); Citizen's Unity (2017–2019); Frente de Todos (2019–2023); Union for the Homeland (2023–present)
- Education: Otto Krause Technical School

Verónica María Magario (born 26 May 1969) is an Argentine politician, currently serving as Vice Governor of Buenos Aires Province, alongside Governor Axel Kicillof, since 10 December 2019. From 2015 to 2019, Magario was intendente (mayor) of La Matanza, the most populous partido in the Greater Buenos Aires metropolitan area.

She was also a National Deputy from 2013 to 2015, and member of the La Matanza city council from 2011 to 2013.

== Early life and education ==
Verónica María Magario was born on 26 May 1969 in Santa Fe de la Vera Cruz, in Santa Fe Province. Her parents were María Eugenia Calderón, a school teacher, and Raúl Magario, a member of Montoneros and the organization's financial administrator. She spent most of her childhood in San Isidro and Ramos Mejía, but after the 1976 coup d'état, her family was forced into exile in Mexico, where she lived for eight years.

The family returned to Argentina in 1984, after the fall of the last military dictatorship, and Raúl Magario was imprisoned; he was released in 1989 following a pardon issued by president Carlos Menem. Magario attended the Otto Krause Technical School and graduated with a technical degree on chemistry, which she used to work as a high school teacher.

She began studying mathematics at the University of Buenos Aires, hoping to eventually attain a licenciatura and attend the Balseiro Institute to become a nuclear physicist, but she had to drop out as her studies interfered with her burgeoning political career.

== Political career ==
Magario started working at the Argentine Chamber of Deputies in 1988, where she met national deputy Alberto Balestrini and became an advisor in his legislative office. Concurrently, she became a union delegate at the Asociación del Personal Legislativo (legislative workers' union).

She accompanied Balestrini upon his election as intendente of La Matanza in 1999, holding a number of municipal posts. She remained in the municipal government when Balestrini was succeeded by Fernando Espinoza in 2005, becoming his deputy chief of staff in 2006.

In 2011 she was elected to the La Matanza city council, which she went on to preside. Magario was the third candidate in the Front for Victory list to the Argentine Chamber of Deputies at the 2013 legislative election; she was elected and sworn in on 10 December 2013.

=== Mayor of La Matanza ===
At the 2015 municipal election, running as the Front for Victory's mayoral candidate, Magario received 47.54% of the vote, defeating the Cambiemos candidate by over 20 points. She succeeded Fernando Espinoza on 12 December 2015 to become La Matanza's first woman mayor. As mayor, she rejected the proposal to split the partido introduced by GEN provincial deputy Marcelo Díaz.

She was the first Citizen's Unity candidate for the La Matanza city council at the 2017 legislative election; the candidacy was unsuccessfully denounced as "testimonial" before the provincial Electoral Tribunal.

=== Vice governor of Buenos Aires ===
Ahead of the 2019 general election, Magario was chosen as Axel Kicillof's running mate in the Frente de Todos list for the governorship of Buenos Aires. The Kicillof–Magario ticket won 52.15% of the vote, against incumbent governor María Eugenia Vidal's 38.49%. She took office alongside Kicillof on 11 December 2019.

== Electoral history ==
=== Executive ===
Electoral history of Verónica Magario
Election	Office	List	Votes			Result	Ref.
Election	Office	List	Total	%	P.	Result	Ref.
2015	Mayor of La Matanza	Front for Victory	352,422	47.74%	1st	Elected	
2019	Vice Governor of Buenos Aires	Frente de Todos	5,274,511	52.40%	1st	Elected	
2023	Vice Governor of Buenos Aires	Union for the Homeland	4,233,092	44.88%	1st	Elected	

=== Legislative ===
Electoral history of Verónica Magario
Election	Office	List	#	District	Votes			Result	Ref.
Election	Office	List	#	District	Total	%	P.	Result	Ref.
2011	Councillor	Front for Victory	1	La Matanza Partido	392,535	60.56%	1st (Note: Presented on an electoral list. The data shown represents the share of the vote the entire party/alliance received in that constituency.)	Elected	
2013	National Deputy	Front for Victory	3	Buenos Aires Province	2,900,494	32.33%	2nd	Elected	
2017	Councillor	Unidad Ciudadana	1	La Matanza Partido	397,298	50.02%	1st	Elected (Note: Never took office.)	

Political offices
Preceded by Fernando Espinoza	Mayor of La Matanza; 2015–2019	Succeeded by Fernando Espinoza
Preceded by Daniel Salvador	Vice Governor of Buenos Aires; 2019–present	Succeeded by Incumbent
