= Villa Luzuriaga =

- Town
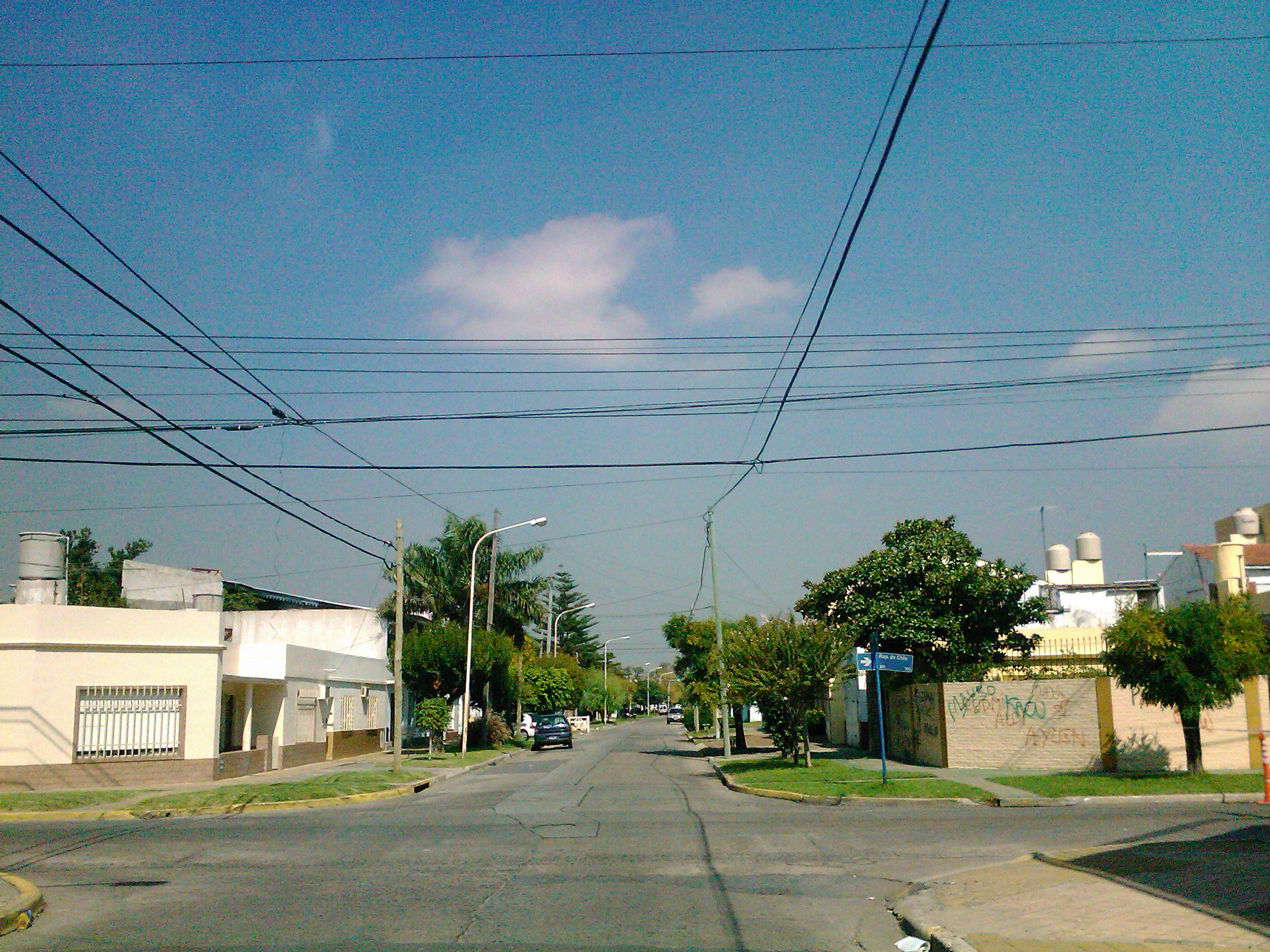
- Street in Villa Luzuriaga

- Location in Greater Buenos Aires
- Coordinates: 34°40′00″S 58°35′00″W
- Country: Argentina
- Province: Buenos Aires
- Partido: La Matanza
- Established: 1 June 1939

Area
  - Total: 9.43 km^{2} (3.64 sq mi)
- Elevation: 25 m (82 ft)

Population (2001 census [INDEC])
  - Total: 73,681
  - Density: 7,810/km^{2} (20,200/sq mi)
- CPA Base: B 1754
- Area code: +54 011

Villa Luzuriaga, formally Villa General Luzuriaga, is a city in La Matanza Partido, Buenos Aires Province, Argentina. It forms part of the urban area of Greater Buenos Aires. The locality was granted city status by Provincial Law No. 13,970 in 2009.

== History ==
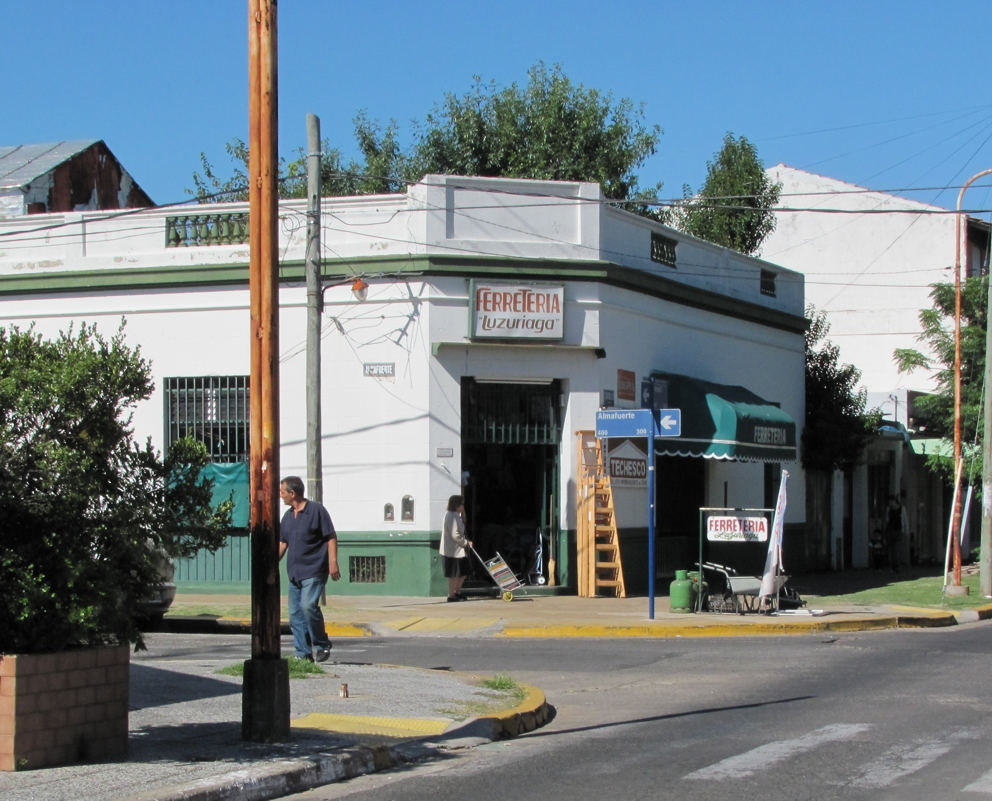
Corner store in Villa Luzuriaga

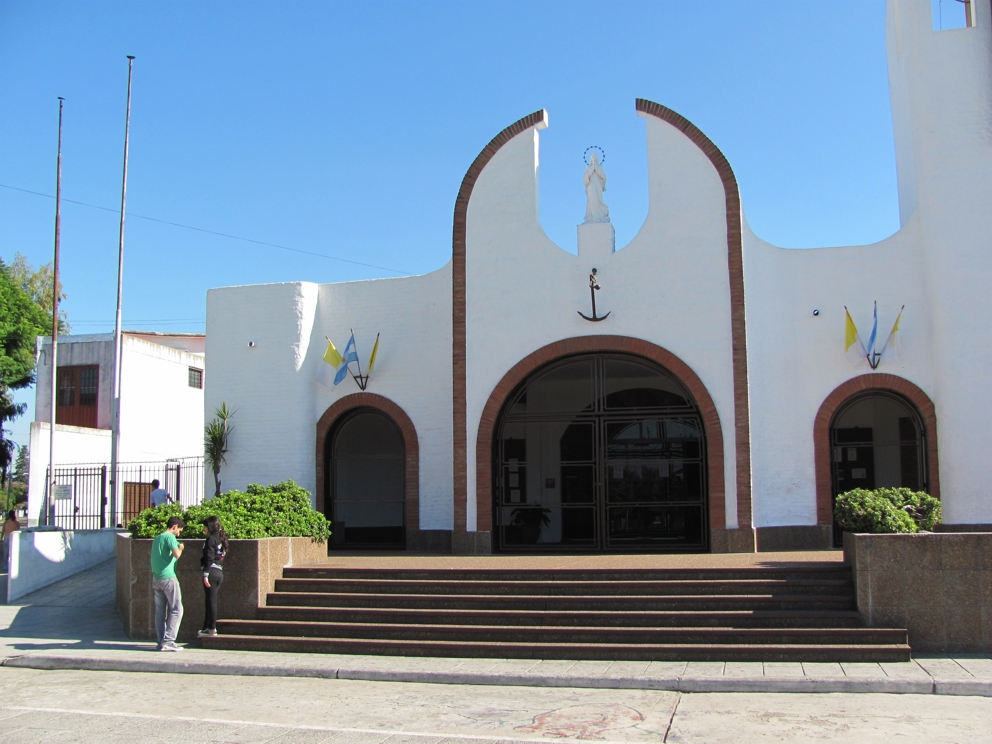
Stella Maris parish

During the colonial period, the area was known as Alto Redondo. It remained predominantly rural throughout the nineteenth century and was occupied by a small number of landowning families, including the Méndez, Villegas, Madariaga, Navarro, Cufre and Schoo families.

In 1888, former Buenos Aires city councillor Nicanor Méndez acquired approximately 72 ha (180 acres) of land and constructed a twelve-room country house. The property was named Villa Las Margaritas in honour of his wife, Margarita Elsegood. Following her death in 1908, the Méndez family sold the property through auctioneer Manuel T. Durán. The estate was divided into 1,651 lots, which were offered in 80 interest-free monthly instalments. The resulting settlement became popularly known as Villa Vieja, although the wider area continued to be called Villa Las Margaritas.

The settlement began to grow during the early twentieth century, initially attracting employees of the railway workshops at Haedo and workers associated with Ingeniero Brian station. Building activity intensified between 1914 and 1947, leading to the formation of neighbourhoods such as Ramón Falcón, Villa Santa Teresita, Villa Colombo, Santiago Brian and Villa Mazzarello. Until the mid-twentieth century, much of the population consisted of European immigrants, particularly Italians, Portuguese and Spaniards. Migrants from other Argentine provinces began arriving in greater numbers during the 1930s, followed later by immigrants from neighbouring countries.

The origin of the name Villa Luzuriaga is not conclusively documented. Local historians associate it with Julio Félix Luzuriaga, a jurist and historian who owned property in the area during the early twentieth century. Local accounts credit his participation in efforts to establish a school, introduce electric lighting and organize an early neighbourhood improvement association. His family was also politically prominent: his sister Delia Luzuriaga was married to future president Ramón S. Castillo.

On 1 June 1939, the Deliberative Council of La Matanza approved Municipal Ordinance No. 542, establishing a new street nomenclature in which the name Villa Luzuriaga appeared officially. The date is generally commemorated as the foundation of the locality. Urbanisation continued through residential subdivisions, credit programmes and social-housing developments. Several developments were associated with the Argentine Navy and workers' organisations such as the Unión Ferroviaria and the Asociación del Personal Aeronáutico, which enabled their members to construct homes in the locality. In 2009, the Legislature of Buenos Aires Province formally declared Villa General Luzuriaga a city through Provincial Law No. 13,970.

== Geography ==
Villa Luzuriaga is situated in the first urban ring of Greater Buenos Aires and has an area of approximately 9.43 km^{2} (3.64 sq mi). Its boundaries follow Avenida Don Bosco, Avenida Cristianía, Venezuela, Mon, Bufano, Lartigau, Rivera Indarte and La Paz streets, as well as the railway corridor of the Haedo–La Plata branch. It borders Morón Partido and the cities of Ramos Mejía, San Justo, Rafael Castillo and Isidro Casanova.

The locality is predominantly residential, although it also contains commercial and industrial activity. Its incorporation into the metropolitan urban area took place gradually: although much of the first ring of Greater Buenos Aires was considered fully urbanised by 1950, some sections of Villa Luzuriaga still contained undeveloped or inadequately serviced land during the 1960s. According to the 2001 census, Villa Luzuriaga had 73,681 inhabitants.

== Notable landmarks ==
Plaza Armada Argentina is the principal public square of Villa Luzuriaga. It is situated near Bermúdez and Pichincha streets, adjacent to the Stella Maris parish complex. The square was developed through contributions from the Argentine Navy and work carried out by local residents, and has served as a venue for civic ceremonies and community events. Other notable landmarks include the Stella Marish parish, originally established as a smaller chapel, and later expanded through successive community-supported construction projects, and the Flag Monument inaugurated on 20 June 1945, opposite the town's police detachment.
