= Buenos Aires Province Senate =

Senate of Buenos Aires Province Senado de la Provincia de Buenos Aires

Type
- Type: Upper house of the Legislature of Buenos Aires Province

Leadership
- President: Verónica Magario, UP since 10 December 2019
- 1st Vice President: Luis Vivona, UP since 10 December 2021
- 2nd Vice President: Alejandro Cellillo, UCR since 10 December 2021
- 3rd Vice President: Ayelen Durán, UP since 10 December 2021

Structure
- Seats: 92
- Political groups: Union for the Homeland (24); La Libertad Avanza (10); PRO (5); UCR–CF (4); Union and Freedom (3)

Elections
- Voting system: Party-list proportional representation Hare quota
- Last election: 7 September 2025

Meeting place
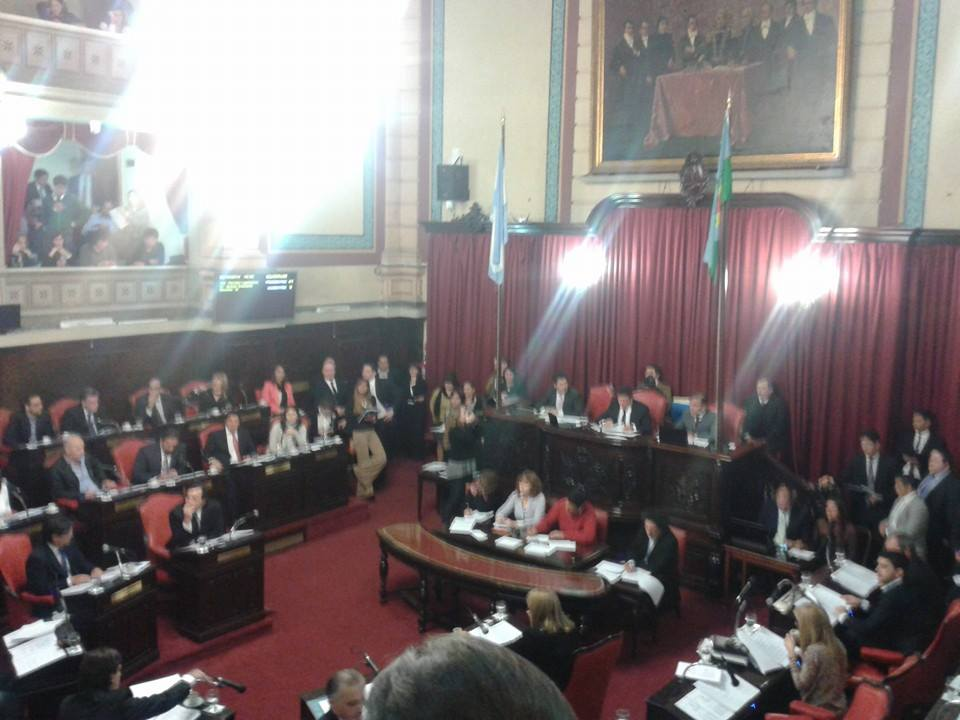
- Legislative Palace of the Province of Buenos Aires; La Plata, Argentina

Website
- http://www.senado-ba.gov.ar/

The Senate of Buenos Aires Province (Spanish: Senado de la provincia de Buenos Aires) is the upper house of the Legislature of Buenos Aires Province, the largest and most populous of Argentina's provinces. It comprises 46 members elected in eight multi-member constituencies known as Electoral Sections. The number of senators that correspond to each of the electoral sections is proportional to their population, as observed in the results of every nationwide census conducted in Argentina every 10 years. Seats may only be added to adjust the proportionality of each section, but never reduced.

As in the National Chamber of Deputies and most other provincial legislatures, elections to the Senate are held every two years, so that half of its members are up in each election. The same system is employed in the provincial Chamber of Deputies.

The Senate was established with the promulgation of the Constitution of the State of Buenos Aires, a short-lived secessionist state, in 1854. Originally located in the City of Buenos Aires, the provincial legislature was moved to La Plata following that city's establishment in 1882. The body meets in the Legislative Palace, designed by Hannover architects Gustav Heine and Georg Hagemann in 1883 and completed in 1888.

== List of presidents of the Senate ==
The Senate is chaired by the vice governor of the province, who is elected alongside the governor every four years. The Vice Governor may only cast tie-breaking votes (according to article 93 of the provincial constitution). The following is a list of vice governors of Buenos Aires since the return of democracy in 1983.

President	Party	Term start	Term end	Governor
Elva Roulet	UCR	10 December 1983	10 December 1987	Alejandro Armendáriz
Luis María Macaya	PJ–FR	10 December 1987	10 December 1991	Antonio Cafiero
Rafael Romá	PJ	10 December 1991	10 December 1999	Eduardo Duhalde
Felipe Solá	PJ	10 December 1999	3 January 2002	Carlos Ruckauf
Alejandro Corvatta	PJ	3 January 2002	10 December 2003	Felipe Solá
Graciela Giannettasio	PJ–FPV	10 December 2003	10 December 2007	Felipe Solá
Alberto Balestrini	PJ–FPV	10 December 2007	7 April 2010	Daniel Scioli
Gabriel Mariotto	PJ–FPV	7 April 2010	10 December 2015	Daniel Scioli
Daniel Salvador	UCR–C	10 December 2015	10 December 2019	María Eugenia Vidal
Verónica Magario	PJ–UP	10 December 2019	incumbent	Axel Kicillof
