= Rafael Pascual =

Rafael Pascual may refer to:

- Rafael Pascual (volleyball)
- Rafael Pascual (politician)
