= Alberto Balestrini =

Argentine politician

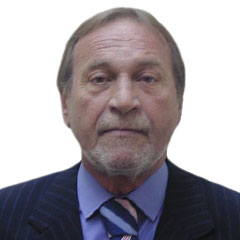

Vice Governor of Buenos Aires
- In office 10 December 2007 – 7 April 2010
- Governor: Daniel Scioli
- Preceded by: Graciela Giannettasio
- Succeeded by: Gabriel Mariotto

President of the Chamber of Deputies
- In office 10 December 2005 – 10 December 2007
- Preceded by: Eduardo Camaño
- Succeeded by: Eduardo Fellner

National Deputy
- In office 10 December 2005 – 10 December 2007
- Constituency: Buenos Aires
- In office 10 December 1991 – 10 December 1995
- Constituency: Buenos Aires

Mayor of La Matanza
- In office 10 December 1999 – 10 December 2005
- Preceded by: Francisco Di Leva
- Succeeded by: Fernando Espinoza

Provincial Senator of Buenos Aires
- In office 10 December 1995 – 10 December 1999
- Constituency: Third Electoral Section

Personal details
- Born: 9 March 1947 Buenos Aires, Argentina
- Died: 11 April 2017 (aged 70) Banfield, Buenos Aires Province, Argentina
- Party: Justicialist Party
- Other political affiliations: Front for Victory (2003–2017)
- Education: Universidad del Salvador
- Profession: lawyer

Alberto Edgardo Balestrini (9 March 1947 – 4 April 2017) was an Argentine lawyer and politician of the Justicialist Party. Balestrini held a number of important posts throughout his career: he served as Vice Governor of Buenos Aires Province under Daniel Scioli from 2007 to 2010, as President of the Argentine Chamber of Deputies from 2005 to 2007, and as intendente (mayor) of La Matanza from 1999 to 2005.

In addition, Balestrini served as a member of the Buenos Aires provincial senate, and as president of the Buenos Aires Province chapter of the Justicialist Party. Balestrini's career was cut short by a debilitating stroke in April 2010, following which he retired from politics in order to recover. He died in 2017, aged 70.

== Early life and education ==
Alberto Balestrini was born on 9 March 1947 in Buenos Aires. His father was a Peronist military officer who was forced into exile in 1955 following the coup of the Revolución Libertadora and the ensuing dictatorship; for this reason, Balestrini spent part of his childhood in Chile.

Balestrini studied magistracy at the Instituto Padre Elizalde in Ciudadela. In the 1970s he began his political career in the students' union of the Universidad del Salvador, from which he attained his law degree in 1975. During the last military dictatorship (1976–1983), Balestrini worked with Father Carlos Mugica.

== Political career ==
Balestrini began his career in the Justicialist Party under the wing of Alberto Pierri, an important Justicialist leader in La Matanza. When Pierri backed Carlos Menem's re-election campaign in 1999, however, Balestrini backed Eduardo Duhalde in the Justicialist Party primaries. Duhalde then selected Balestrini as the mayoral candidate in that year's election in La Matanza. Balestrini ran against Alliance candidate Lidia "Pinky" Satragno; upon his victory, the Justicialist Party continued its streak as the sole ruling party in the district since 1983.

Toward the end of the 1990s, Balestrini formed, alongside Julio Alak and Juan José Álvarez, a trio of promising young Justicialist politicians known as the "Three Musketeers". Balestrini maintained amicable relations with the Piquetero leaders Juan Carlos Alderete and Luis D'Elía.

After being elected to the Argentine Chamber of Deputies for a second time in 2005, Balestrini was voted as the new president of the Chamber, a post he held until 2007. At the 2007 provincial elections in Buenos Aires, Balestrini was Daniel Scioli's running mate in the Justicialist Party–Front for Victory gubernatorial ticket. Scioli and Balestrini won the election with 49% of the votes, ahead of the Civic Coalition candidate Margarita Stolbizer.

In December 2008, Balestrini was elected as the new president of the Buenos Aires Province chapter of the Justicialist Party.

== Later years and death ==
On 7 April 2010, Balestrini suffered a debilitating stroke and was interned at the Policlínico General San Martín in La Plata. As he was unfit for office, he was succeeded in his posts; by Gabriel Mariotto as Vice Governor of Buenos Aires and by Hugo Moyano as president of the Buenos Aires PJ. Balestrini never fully recovered and wouldn't walk on his own again until 2013.

In 2013, he was honored with the naming of a maternity and pediatric hospital, the Dr. Alberto Balestrini Hospital, located in La Matanza. The inauguration was attended by then-Argentine President Cristina Kirchner.

Balestrini died in the early morning of 11 April 2017, in a private clinic in Banfield.

== Bibliography ==
- O'Donnell, María (2012). El aparato. Aguilar. ISBN 9870423175.

Political offices
Preceded by Francisco Di Leva	Mayor of La Matanza; 1999–2005	Succeeded by Fernando Espinoza
Preceded by Eduardo Camaño	President of the Chamber of Deputies; 2005–2007	Succeeded by Eduardo Fellner
Preceded by Graciela Giannettasio	Vice Governor of Buenos Aires; 2007–2010	Succeeded by Gabriel Mariotto
