= Isidro Casanova =

City in Buenos Aires Province, Argentina

- City

- Location in Greater Buenos Aires
- Coordinates: 34°42′S 58°35′W
- Country: Argentina
- Province: Buenos Aires
- Partido: La Matanza
- Founded: May 15, 1911

Area
  - Total: 19.5 km^{2} (7.5 sq mi)
- Elevation: 14 m (46 ft)

Population (2001 census [INDEC])
  - Total: 131,981
  - Density: 6,770/km^{2} (17,500/sq mi)
- CPA Base: B 1765
- Area code: +54 11
- Website: www.casanova-web.com.ar

Isidro Casanova is a city in La Matanza Partido, Greater Buenos Aires, Argentina. It borders the towns of Villa Luzuriaga, San Justo, Ciudad Evita, Rafael Castillo, Laferrere, and Ezeiza.

== History ==
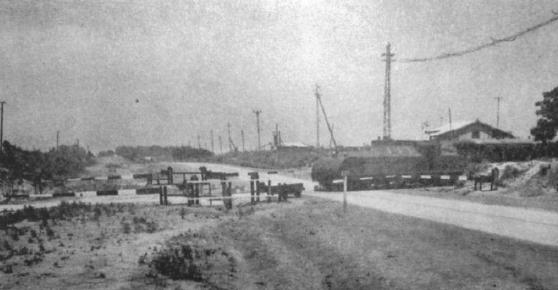
1939 view of local stretch of Route 3

The area encompassing Isidro Casanova was initially utilized by cattle ranches and dairy farms established by German Argentine immigrants around 1850. The Buenos Aires Midland Railway (Spanish: Ferrocarril Midland de Buenos Aires) extended southwest into the area in 1909, and the San Sebastián station was inaugurated. A railyard followed in 1910, and in 1911, the Carhué station was opened; though the town has no specific establishment date, May 15 of that year was later acknowledged as its foundation.

The settlement's first significant manufacturing establishment was inaugurated shortly afterward by Isidro Casanova, an Italian Argentine immigrant. The town was renamed in his honor following his death, and one of its main streets would later be named República de Portugal in honor of the town's distinction as the home of the largest Portuguese community in Argentina. The Provincial Legislature recognized Isidro Casanova as a city on August 29, 1974. Local historian Alejandro Enrique published two volumes on the history of Isidro Casanova in 2010.

== Sport ==
The city is home to the Club Almirante Brown multi-sports club, founded in 1922.
