= Graciela Giannettasio =

Argentine lawyer and politician (1950–2022)

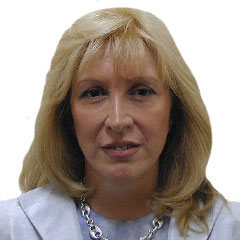
- Giannettasio in 2007

National Deputy
- In office 10 December 2007 – 27 November 2015
- Constituency: Buenos Aires
- In office 10 December 1999 – 7 January 2002
- Constituency: Buenos Aires

Vice Governor of Buenos Aires
- In office 10 December 2003 – 10 December 2007
- Governor: Felipe Solá
- Preceded by: Felipe Solá
- Succeeded by: Alberto Balestrini

Minister of Education, Science and Technology
- In office 7 January 2002 – 25 May 2003
- President: Eduardo Duhalde
- Preceded by: Ricardo Biazzi
- Succeeded by: Daniel Filmus

Provincial Senator of Buenos Aires
- In office 10 December 1987 – April 1992
- Constituency: Third Electoral Section

Personal details
- Born: 20 October 1950 Remedios de Escalada, Argentina
- Died: 5 April 2022 (aged 71)
- Party: Justicialist Party
- Other political affiliations: Front for Victory (2003–2015)
- Education: University of Buenos Aires

Graciela María Giannettasio de Saiegh (20 October 1950 – 5 April 2022) was an Argentine politician belonging to the Justicialist Party. She served in a number of high-profile posts during her career, most notably as Minister of Education during the interim presidency of Eduardo Duhalde from 2002 to 2003, and later as Vice Governor of Buenos Aires Province under Felipe Solá from 2003 to 2007.

== Early life and education ==
Giannettasio was born on 20 October 1950 in Remedios de Escalada, in the Lanús Partido of Buenos Aires Province. She attended an Escuela Normal to become a teacher, and later attained a law degree from the University of Buenos Aires, specialising in administrative law.

== Political career ==
Giannettasio's first political post was as director of legal affairs at the municipal government of Lomas de Zamora, during the mayorship of Eduardo Duhalde. Since then, she forged a close political relationship with Duhalde and his wife, Hilda González de Duhalde, who were important members of the Buenos Aires Province Justicialist Party (PJ).

Giannettasio later served in a number of posts in the municipality of Florencio Varela, up until her election to the Provincial Senate in 1987 on the Justicialist Party ticket. She was re-elected for a second four-year term in 1991, but resigned in 1992 when she was appointed Director General of Culture and Education in the provincial government, then led by Duhalde. During her tenure, she introduced a controversial education reform which transformed primary education into the "Educación General Básica" (EGB) and secondary education into the polimodal systems. She later supported efforts to reverse the reform during the tenure of Adriana Puiggrós as education minister of Buenos Aires.

In the 1999 legislative election, Giannettasio ran for one of Buenos Aires's 35 seats in the National Chamber of Deputies as part of the Justicialist Party list. With 41.68% of the vote, the Justicialist Party received enough votes for Giannettasio to gain a seat, and she took office on 10 December 1999. In January 2002, in the aftermath of the December 2001 rioting and presidential succession crisis, Eduardo Duhalde was appointed interim president of Argentina, and Giannettasio became Minister of Education, Science and Technology in his government.

=== Vice Governor of Buenos Aires ===
In the 2003 provincial election, Felipe Solá and Giannettasio ran on the Justicialist Party ticket for the governorship and vice-governorship of Buenos Aires, respectively. The Solá–Giannettasio ticket won with 43.32% of the vote. She was the second woman to hold the position of Vice Governor in Buenos Aires, after Elva Roulet did so from 1983 to 1987. In 2004, Giannettasio briefly served as the interim head of the provincial ministry of security after the resignation of Raúl Rivara. During her tenure, she supported efforts to include women in high-ranking executive and legislative posts.

Giannettasio did not run for a second term as Vice Governor in 2007, and Alberto Balestrini was Solá's running mate in the 2007 provincial election. Instead, she ran for a seat in the Chamber of Deputies in that year's legislative election, as the sixth candidate on the Front for Victory (FPV) list. With 46.02% of the vote, the FPV received sufficient support for Giannettasio to be elected. She was re-elected in 2011, this time as the 10th candidate on the FPV list. She did not run for a third term in 2015.

== Personal life ==
Giannettasio was married to businessman and fellow Justicialist Party politician Miguel Saiegh. She lived in Florencio Varela. In 2006, her private residence was burgled while she was abroad.

She died on 5 April 2022 at the age of 71 after a long illness.
