= Doce noches =

Non-fiction book by Argentine writer Ceferino Reato

- Author: Ceferino Reato
- Language: Spanish
- Subject: December 2001 riots in Argentina
- Genre: History
- Publisher: Sudamericana
- Publication date: 2015
- Publication place: Argentina
- ISBN: 978-950-07-5203-9

Doce Noches (Spanish: Twelve nights) is a 2015 Argentine book by Ceferino Reato. It details the causes and consequences of the December 2001 riots in Argentina, that forced the president Fernando de la Rúa to resign, and the appointment of Adolfo Rodríguez Saá and Eduardo Duhalde as presidents by the Congress.

== Release ==
The book was presented at the Buenos Aires International Book Fair, alongside the politicians Mauricio Macri, Ernesto Sanz, Elisa Carrió, Rafael Pascual and Ramón Puerta. A common controversy about the riots is the alleged involvement of the Justicialist Party in them, and if it was a "Soft coup" against De la Rúa or not. The book cites the reasons and evidences used by both the supporters and detractors of that idea, without openly taking a side. Pascual agreed with the idea, Puerta did not.
