= Lyna Vallejos =

Argentine gamer, writer and YouTuber

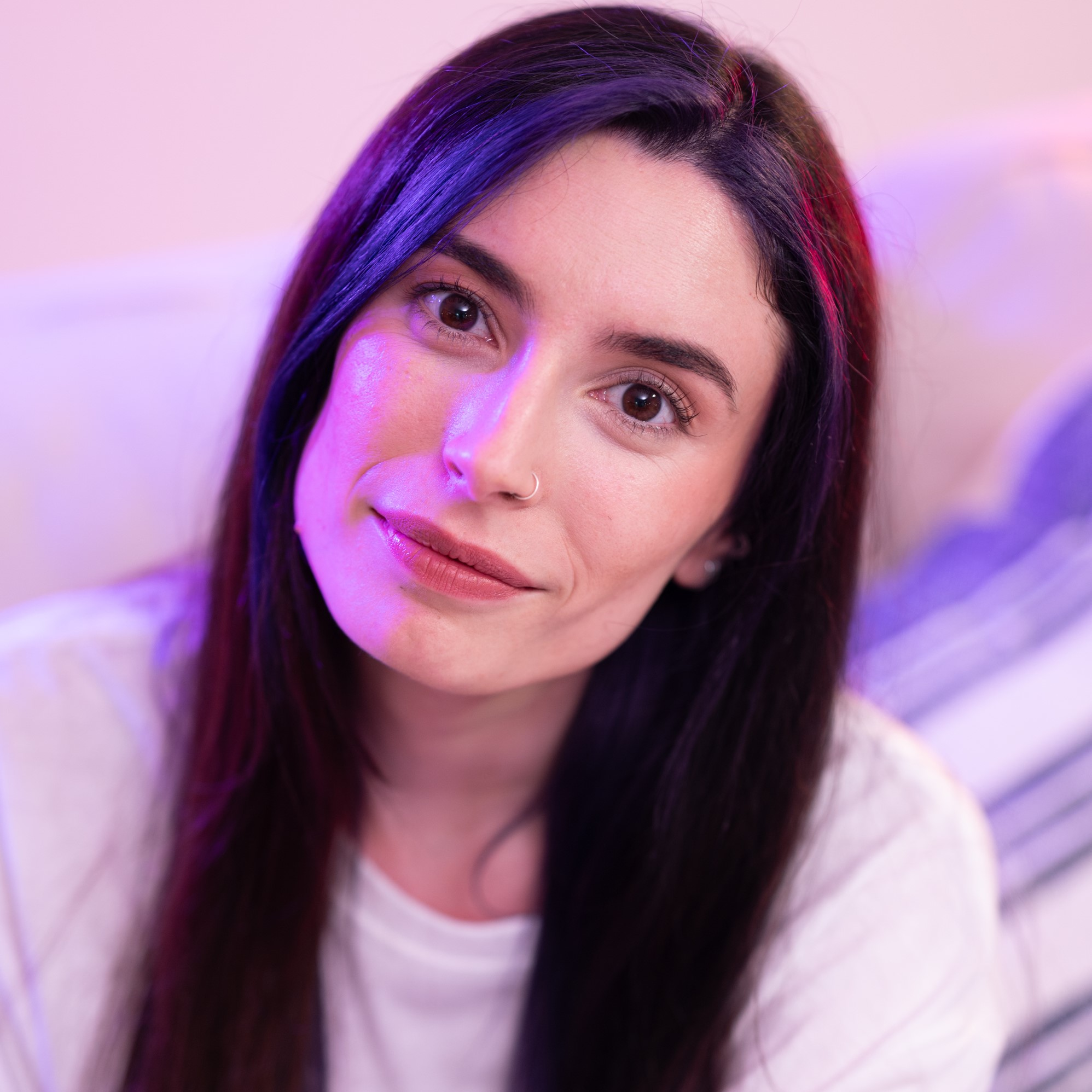
- Vallejos in 2023
- Born: Evelyn Vallejos; 1993 or 1994 (age 32–33); Morón, Buenos Aires, Argentina
- Education: National University of La Matanza
- Occupations: Gamer, writer, YouTuber
- Spouse: Daniel Morro

YouTube information
- Channel: Lyna
- Years active: 2014–present
- Subscribers: 25.1 million
- Views: 11 billion
- Last updated: 13 July 2026

Evelyn Vallejos (born 1993/1994), known professionally as Lyna, is an Argentine gamer, writer and YouTuber. She is best known for her Minecraft and Roblox videos. As of July 2026, her YouTube channel has over 25.1 million subscribers.

== Life and career ==
Vallejos was born in Morón, Buenos Aires. Her father worked as a truck driver, and her mother worked in a neuropsychiatric hospital. At an early age, her parents divorced. She was a dancer and a model. She attended the National University of La Matanza, studying journalism.

On 8 September 2014, Vallejo created her YouTube channel, uploading her first gameplay video of the social simulation game The Sims 4 on 12 September. She then began uploading Minecraft and Roblox videos, and in 2018, she wrote the children's saga An Abnormal Family, published by Random House. In the same year, she stopped uploading gameplays of The Sims 4.

As of 2026, Vallejo mainly uploads Roblox gameplays on her YouTube channel.

== Personal life ==
Vallejo is married to Daniel Morro, a YouTuber. She lives in Palma de Mallorca in Spain with Morro.
