= Cristian Ritondo =

Argentine politician

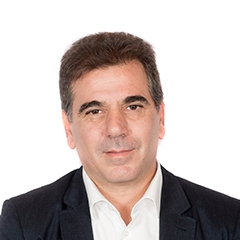
- Ritondo in 2020

National Deputy
- Incumbent
- Assumed office 10 December 2019
- Constituency: Buenos Aires
- In office 10 December 2003 – 10 December 2007
- Constituency: City of Buenos Aires

Personal details
- Born: 27 July 1966 (age 59) Buenos Aires
- Party: Justicialist Party (1982–2005); Republican Proposal (2005–present)
- Other political affiliations: Juntos por el Cambio (2005–2023)
- Profession: Politician

Cristian Adrián Ritondo (27 July 1966) is an Argentine politician and National Deputy for Buenos Aires Province. He leads Republican Proposal in the lower house of National Congress.

== Political career ==
Born in the neighborhood of Mataderos, Buenos Aires. He is married and the father of two sons. He was Undersecretary of the Interior of the Nation (2001-2003) during the presidency of Eduardo Duhalde. After, he was National Deputy (2006-2007) and Legislator in the City of Buenos Aires (2007-2015) for Republican Proposal. In 2009 he became the President of the PRO block in the Buenos Aires City Legislature. From 2011 to 2015 he was the 1st Vice President of the Legislature.

Between December 10, 2015 and December 9, 2019, he was part of María Eugenia Vidal's cabinet in the Province of Buenos Aires as Minister of Security.

On December 10, 2019, he assumed as National Deputy for Juntos por el Cambio for Buenos Aires Province, with a mandate until 2023. Ritondo was elected chairman of the Republican Proposal bloc in the lower house.
