= Eduardo Camaño =

President of Argentina

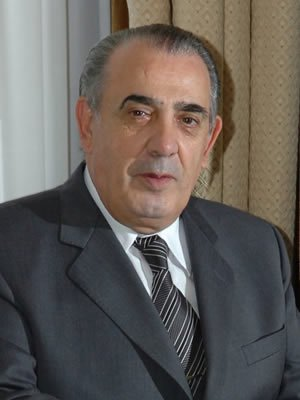

Acting President of Argentina (Note: President of the Chamber of Deputies in exercise of the Executive Branch)
- In office 31 December 2001 – 2 January 2002
- Vice President: None
- Preceded by: Adolfo Rodríguez Saá
- Succeeded by: Eduardo Duhalde

President of the Chamber of Deputies
- In office 5 December 2001 – 6 December 2005
- Preceded by: Rafael Pascual
- Succeeded by: Alberto Balestrini

Minister of Government of Buenos Aires Province
- In office 20 March 2009 – 10 December 2011
- Governor: Daniel Scioli
- Preceded by: Alberto Pérez
- Succeeded by: Cristina Álvarez Rodríguez

National Deputy
- In office 10 December 1991 – 10 December 2007
- Constituency: Buenos Aires Province

Mayor of Quilmes
- In office 10 December 1987 – 10 December 1991
- Preceded by: Eduardo Vides
- Succeeded by: Aníbal Fernández

Personal details
- Born: 17 June 1946 (age 80) Buenos Aires, Argentina
- Party: Justicialist
- Profession: Lawyer
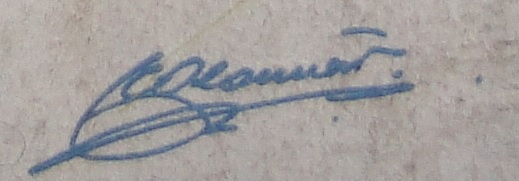
- Signature

Eduardo Oscar Camaño (Spanish pronunciation: [eˈðwaɾðo osˈkaɾ kaˈmaɲo]; born 17 June 1946) is an Argentine Justicialist Party politician. He was in charge of the executive branch in a caretaker capacity, effectively acting as president, for two days between 31 December 2001, and 1 January 2002.

== Political career ==
Camaño was mayor of Quilmes Partido from 1987 to 1991. Until 2007 he sat in the Argentine Chamber of Deputies as a deputy elected in Buenos Aires Province. He served as majority leader of the lower house of the Argentine Congress from 2001, hence bringing him to the position of acting president. He became head of the executive branch because of the resignations of interim President Adolfo Rodríguez Saá and provisional Senate president Ramón Puerta.

In recent years he sat in the Federal Peronist block allied to Eduardo Duhalde, largely in opposition to then President Néstor Kirchner. In 2007, Camaño stood again for deputy, this time heading a list of anti-Kirchner Peronists in support of the presidential bid of dissident Peronist Roberto Lavagna. The list did badly and he faced a recount for the final place in the Chamber for the Province with Ricardo Cuccovillo of the Civic Coalition. Ultimately Cuccovillo was sworn in as deputy and Camaño lost his seat.

Camaño chaired the national council of the Justicialist Party, making him de facto party leader, alongside supporters of both Duhalde and Kirchner. In 2008, when Kirchner assumed the leadership of the Justicialist Party, Camaño was offered an executive position, the only ally of Lavagna to do so, in what had been seen as a chance to reconcile the different wings of Peronism.

== Notes ==
Political offices
Preceded by Rafael Pascual	President of the Chamber of Deputies; 2001–2005	Succeeded by Alberto Balestrini
Preceded by Adolfo Rodríguez Saá as President	Acting head of the executive branch of Argentina; 2001–2002	Succeeded by Eduardo Duhalde as Interim President
