= Ciudad Madero, Argentina =

City in Buenos Aires Province, Argentina

Ciudad Madero
- City
- Location in Greater Buenos Aires
- Coordinates: 34°41′S 58°30′W
- Argentina: Argentina
- Province: Buenos Aires
- Partido: La Matanza
- Founded: 1908

Area
  - Total: 9 km^{2} (3.5 sq mi)
- Elevation: 6 m (20 ft)

Population (2001 census [INDEC])
  - Total: 75,582
  - Density: 8,400/km^{2} (22,000/sq mi)
- CPA Base: B 1768
- Area code: +54 011
- Website: Municipio de La Matanza: Ciudad Madero

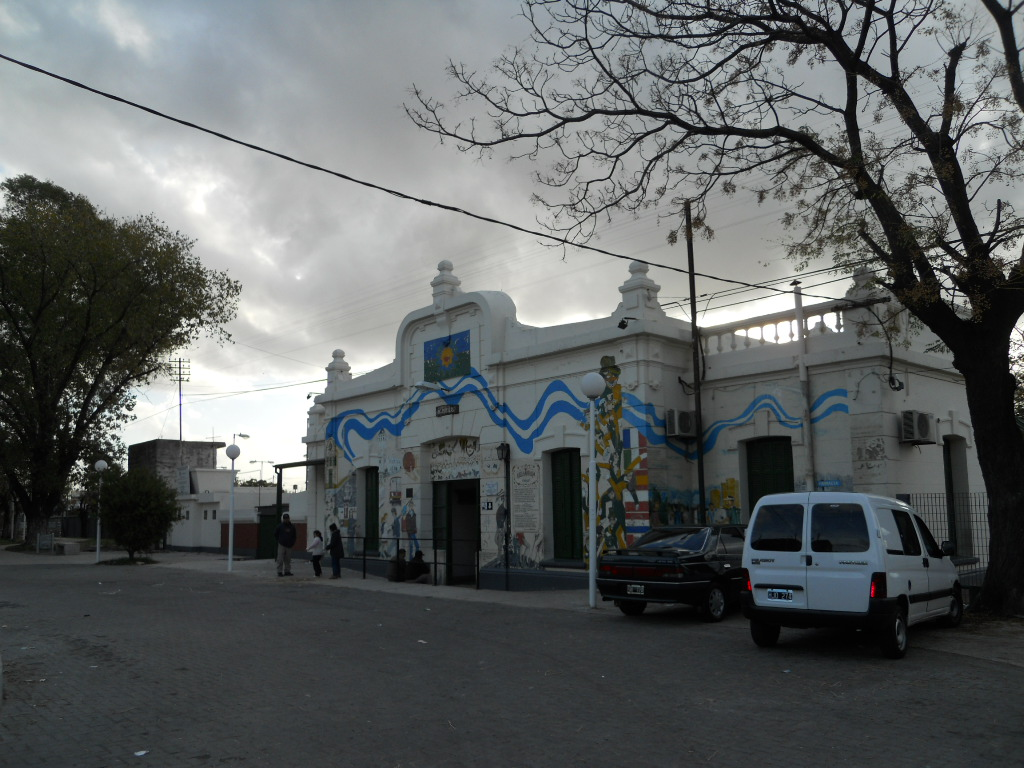
The station at Villa Madero

Ciudad Madero, also known as Villa Eduardo Madero, is a city in La Matanza Partido, Buenos Aires Province, Argentina. It is located within the Greater Buenos Aires metropolitan area.

Populated originally by the Querandí people, a portion of the land today occupied by the city was deed to Pedro Gutiérrez by Governor Hernando Arias de Saavedra in 1615. It was added to Martín José de Altolaguirre's extensive holdings (which would occupy most of northern La Matanza County) in 1775, and was in turn purchased by Francisco Ramos Mejía in 1808. Prior to Mrs. Ramos Mejía's death in 1860, she bequeathed the property among her four children, the second of whom (her daughter, Marta) married a family ally in their struggles against Governor Juan Manuel de Rosas, Francisco Bernabé Madero.

The Maderos lived in rural Dolores Partido; they, however, retained the property in La Matanza as an investment, and leased parcels to tallow refiners. Following Madero's death in 1896, these lands were parceled out to other manufacturers, and by 1900, an informal settlement (Villa Las Fabricas, or, "Factory Town") had been built by the growing numbers of immigrant laborers at the site. The first school was built there in 1905, and the arrival of the Buenos Aires Western Railway in 1908 prompted the creation of the first settlement formally established at the site: Villa Circunvalación.

Villa Circunvalación was established by the sale of lots by La Franco Argentina, a leading Buenos Aires developer which established other nearby towns, and in which the Madero and Ramos Mejía families were shareholders. The Circunvalación and Fabricas settlements became known as Villa Eduardo Madero when the local train station was renamed in 1913 in honor of the former landowner's nephew, Eduardo Madero; Madero, who died in 1894, had developed what became known as Puerto Madero, the nation's first maritime docks.

The city's economy became relatively diversified; its manufacturing base is built on a number of tool and die makers, as well as food processing plants.
