= Karina Banfi =

Argentine politician (born 1972)

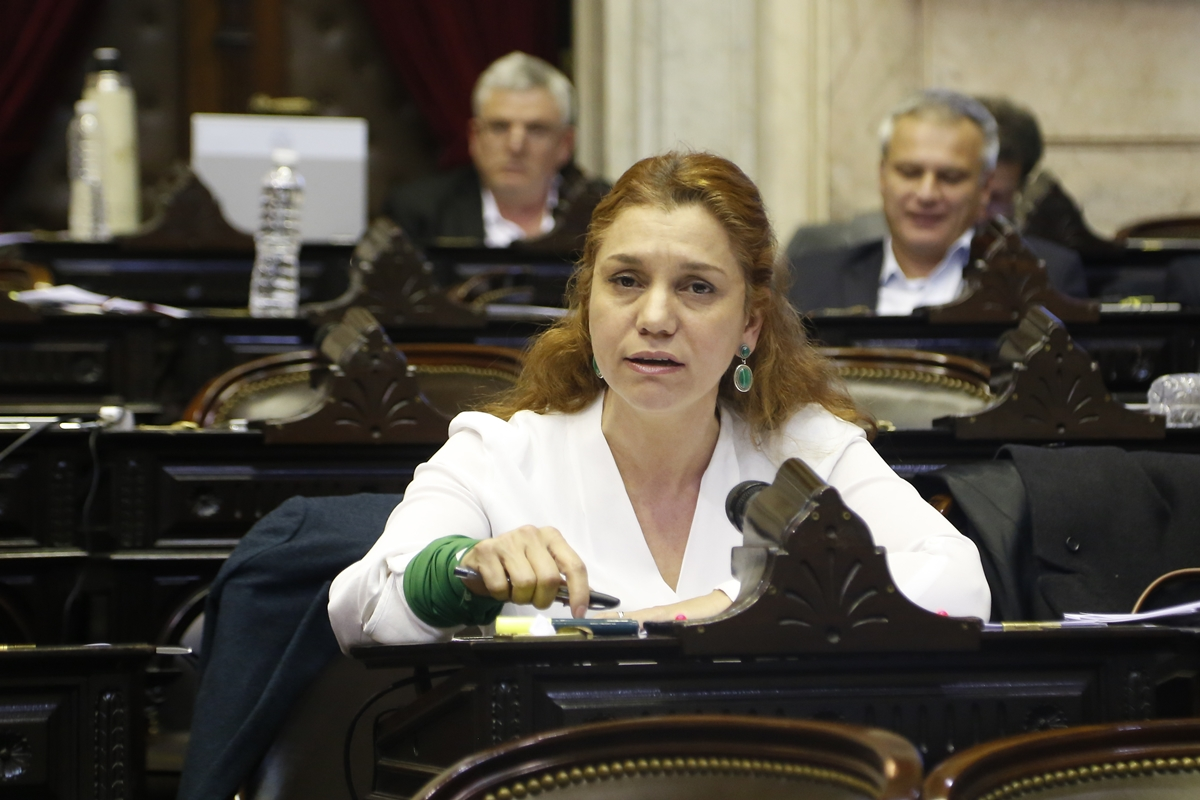

National Deputy
- Incumbent
- Assumed office 10 December 2015
- Constituency: Buenos Aires

Personal details
- Born: 27 February 1972 (age 54) Bahía Blanca, Argentina
- Party: Radical Civic Union; Adelante Buenos Aires (since 2025)
- Other political affiliations: Juntos por el Cambio (2015–2023)
- Education: University of Buenos Aires

Karina Verónica Banfi (born 27 February 1972) is an Argentine politician, currently serving as National Deputy elected in Buenos Aires Province since 2015. She is a member of the Radical Civic Union (UCR).

== Early life and education ==
Banfi was born on 27 February 1972 in Bahía Blanca. She studied law at the University of Buenos Aires and has a postgraduate degree on Law and Compared Media Policies from Oxford University and another on Inter-American and International Human Rights Protection Systems from the Washington College of Law. She is married to Hernán Charosky and has two children.

== Political career ==
Banfi served as Regional Coordinator of Transparency and Governance Programmes at the Organization of American States, and as advisor on Freedom of Expression at the Inter-American Commission on Human Rights.

Banfi ran for a seat in the Chamber of Deputies in the 2015 legislative election, as the tenth candidate in the Cambiemos list in Buenos Aires Province. The list came second with 33.75% of the vote, and Banfi was elected. She was re-elected in 2019, again as the tenth candidate in the Juntos por el Cambio list.

As a national deputy, Banfi formed part of the parliamentary commissions on Communications and Informatics, General Legislation, Constitutional Affairs, Human Rights and Guarantees, Freedom of Expression, Petitions, Powers and Norms, and Foreign Affairs. Banfi was a vocal supporter of the legalization of abortion in Argentina. She voted in favor of the two Voluntary Interruption of Pregnancy bills that were debated by the Argentine Congress in 2018 and 2020.

== Electoral history ==
Electoral history of Karina Banfi
Election	Office	List	#	District	Votes			Result	Ref.
Election	Office	List	#	District	Total	%	P.	Result	Ref.
2015	National Deputy	Cambiemos	10	Buenos Aires Province	3,037,552	33.75%	2nd (Note: Presented on an electoral list. The data shown represents the share of the vote the entire party/alliance received in that constituency.)	Elected	
2019	National Deputy	Juntos por el Cambio	10	Buenos Aires Province	3,668,580	37.77%	2nd	Elected	
2023	National Deputy	Juntos por el Cambio	2	Buenos Aires Province	2,484,593	26.53%	2nd	Elected	
