= Alberto Pierri =

Argentine businessman and politician

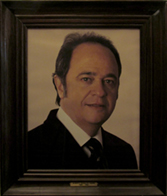

National Deputy
- In office 10 December 1985 – 10 December 2001
- Constituency: Buenos Aires

President of the Chamber of Deputies
- In office 10 December 1989 – 10 December 1999
- Preceded by: Leopoldo Moreau
- Succeeded by: Rafael Pascual

Personal details
- Born: 1948 (age 77–78) Buenos Aires, Argentina
- Party: Justicialist Party

Alberto Reinaldo Pierri (born 1948) is an Argentine businessman and former politician of the Justicialist Party. Pierri is the owner and managing director of Telecentro, one of Argentina's largest communications company. He served as a member of the National Chamber of Deputies elected in Buenos Aires Province during 16 years, and presided the Chamber from 1989 to 1999 – being the longest-serving president of the Chamber of Deputies since the restoration of Argentine democracy in 1983.

His tenure as president of the Chamber of Deputies was marred by a number of controversies, such as the infamous "diputrucho" incident, where a man who was not an elected member of Congress voted in place of an absent deputy. He was the sponsor of the bill that mandated the creation of the National University of La Matanza in 1989.

In 2003, he unsuccessfully ran for Governor of Buenos Aires Province as part of the Front for Loyalty, the electoral coalition backing Carlos Menem in that year's presidential election.

Political offices
Preceded by Leopoldo Moreau	President of the Chamber of Deputies; 1989–1999	Succeeded by Rafael Pascual
