= National University of La Matanza =

University in Argentina

Coordinates: 34°40′14″S 58°33′46″W

- Universidad Nacional de La Matanza
- Type: State
- Established: 1989
- Rector: Prof. Dr. Daniel Martínez
- Academic staff: 1,338
- Students: 41,250
- Location: La Matanza, Buenos Aires, Argentina
- Campus: Urban
- Website: www.unlam.edu.ar

The National University of La Matanza (Spanish: Universidad Nacional de La Matanza, UNLaM) is an Argentine national university situated in La Matanza Partido, Buenos Aires Province.

== History ==
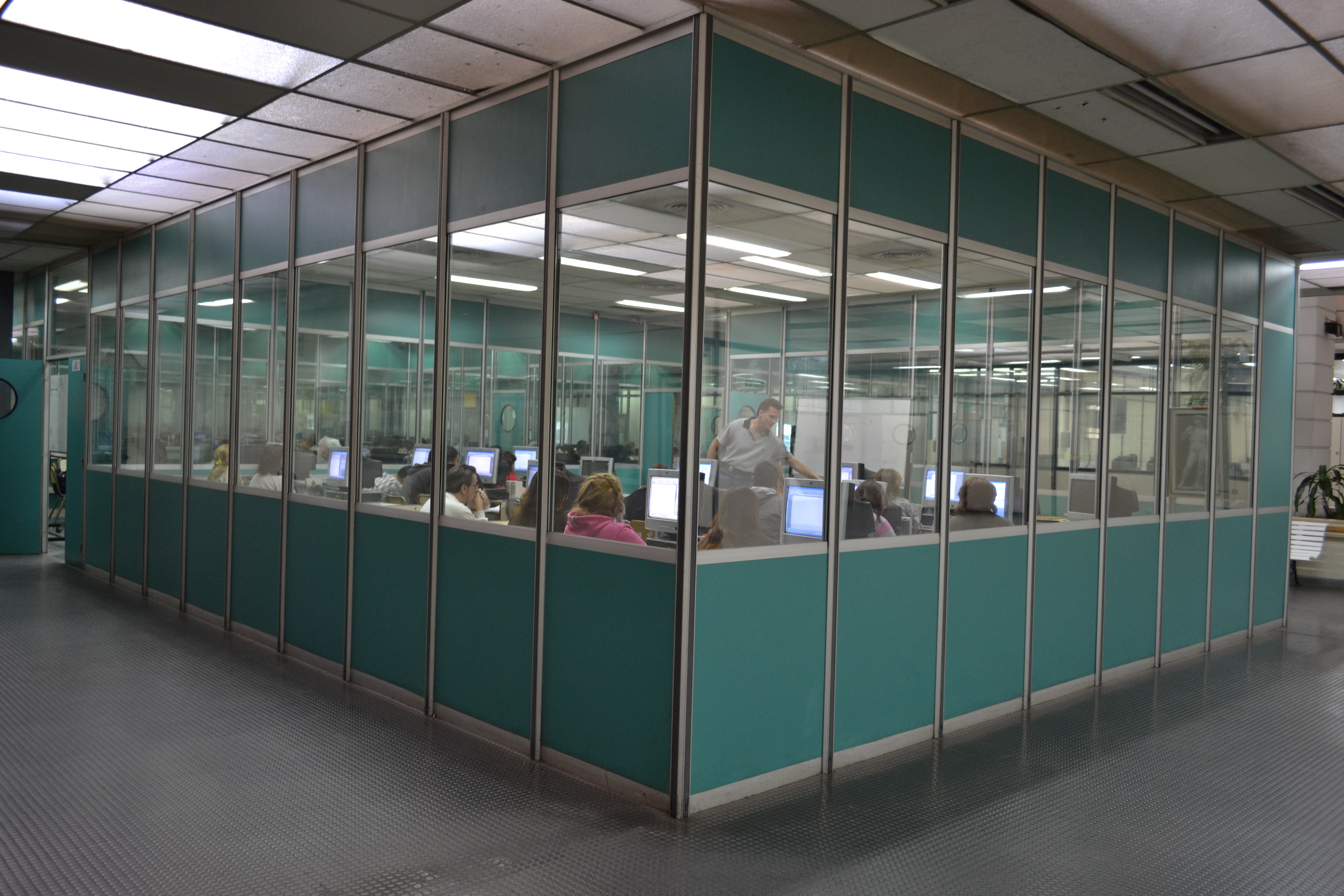

The university was created under the National Law 23.748 on 23 October 1989. This law was enacted to resolve the lack of institutions of higher education over the most populous county in Buenos Aires Province. This law bill encouraged the creation of various universities in the Greater Buenos Aires area. The other universities being National University of Tres de Febrero and National University of Quilmes. This law served a twofold purpose. It will allow a populous urban area to be able to access public and free universities, and it will also ease demographic pressure, particularly on University of Buenos Aires, which had been the only public university available in many science and engineering fields.

Thirty years after its creation, the university was second in number of undergraduate students in the Buenos Aires Province after La Plata National University.

== Departments ==
The institution is divided into departments. The university, as of 2012, offered a Licenciado degree or Ingeniero degree in the following disciplines:

A. Engineering

1. Computer Science
2. Electronic Engineering
3. Industrial Engineering
4. Web engineering

B. Humanities

1. Social communication
2. Social Work
3. Labor Relations
4. Physical Education
5. Public Relations
6. Ceremonial and Etiquette

C. Economics

1. Administration of business
2. Public accounting
3. International Trade
4. Economy

D. Law

1. Law
2. Politics
3. Tutorials

E. Health

1. Nursing
2. Nutrition
3. Kinesiology and Physical medicine and rehabilitation\Phisiatry
4. Medicine

== Postgraduate school ==
In Argentina, and throughout Latin America, postgraduate school education has only been implemented relatively recently due to the widespread hlobalization. At the time of writing, the following programs are being offered in the university.

A. Specialist degree

1. Tax.
2. Customs.
3. Psychoanalysis.
4. Law.

B. Magister degree (Master)

1. Computer Science
2. Environmentalism.
3. International Commerce
4. Social Science.
5. Public Finance
6. Psychoanalysis.
7. Law.

C. Doctorate of Sciences (PhD)

1. Economics

== Sports ==
The university has fostered since its origins sports activities for students. Moreover, an open-doors policy had allowed members of the community to participate actively in sport activities and to use university installations.

In 2007 it was inaugurated a sport ground consisted of a 27-yard long swimming pool, beach volley ground, a soccer pitch and a running track.

== Notable people ==
- Lyna Vallejos – gamer, writer and YouTuber

== See also ==
- List of Argentine universities
