= Rafael Pascual (politician) =

Argentine politician

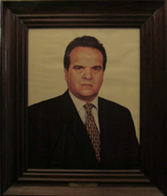

President of the Chamber of Deputies
- In office 10 December 1999 – 10 December 2001
- Preceded by: Alberto Pierri
- Succeeded by: Eduardo Camaño

National Deputy
- In office 10 December 1993 – 10 December 2001
- Constituency: City of Buenos Aires
- In office 10 December 1987 – 10 December 1989
- Constituency: City of Buenos Aires

Personal details
- Born: 18 December 1951 (age 74) Buenos Aires, Argentina
- Party: Radical Civic Union
- Other political affiliations: Alliance for Work, Justice and Education (1997–2001)
- Education: University of Buenos Aires

Rafael Manuel Pascual (born 18 December 1951) is an Argentine politician of the Radical Civic Union. He was a National Deputy elected in Buenos Aires on two occasions, from 1987 to 1989, and later from 1993 to 2001. From 1999 to 2001 he was President of the Chamber of Deputies.

== Early life ==
Pascual was born on 18 December 1951 in the Parque Patricios barrio of Buenos Aires. Before entering politics, he worked as a realtor and administered a gambling agency. He studied law at the University of Buenos Aires. In 1970, as a student, he joined Franja Morada, the Radical Civic Union's student wing. Later, in 1972, he was a delegate to the Argentine University Federation, and in 1975 he became president of the Buenos Aires Juventud Radical.

== Political career ==
Early in his career, as a member of the Juventud Radical, Pascual was a supporter of Ricardo Balbín. Pascual was first elected to the National Chamber of Deputies as part of the Radical Civic Union (UCR) list in Buenos Aires in the 1987 legislative elections. In 1989, he succeeded Fernando de la Rúa as president of the Buenos Aires UCR Committee. He was elected to the Chamber of Deputies a second time in 1993.

He served as Fernando de la Rúa's campaign manager during his successful 1999 presidential run. In that year's legislative election, he ran for re-election in Buenos Aires as the first candidate in the UCR list. Following the election of de la Rúa, Pascual was tapped to be the next president of the Chamber of Deputies, office he took on 10 December 1999. In December 2001, in the aftermath of the political and economic crisis and de la Rúa's resignation, Pascual resigned from his position as president of the Chamber and was succeeded by the peronist Eduardo Camaño.

== Personal life ==
Pascual is married to Graciela Dalma, a judge based in Buenos Aires, and has three children. He is a supporter of Club Atlético Huracán.

Political offices
Preceded by Alberto Pierri	President of the Chamber of Deputies; 1999–2001	Succeeded by Eduardo Camaño
