= San Justo, Buenos Aires =

City in Buenos Aires Province, Argentina

San Justo
- City
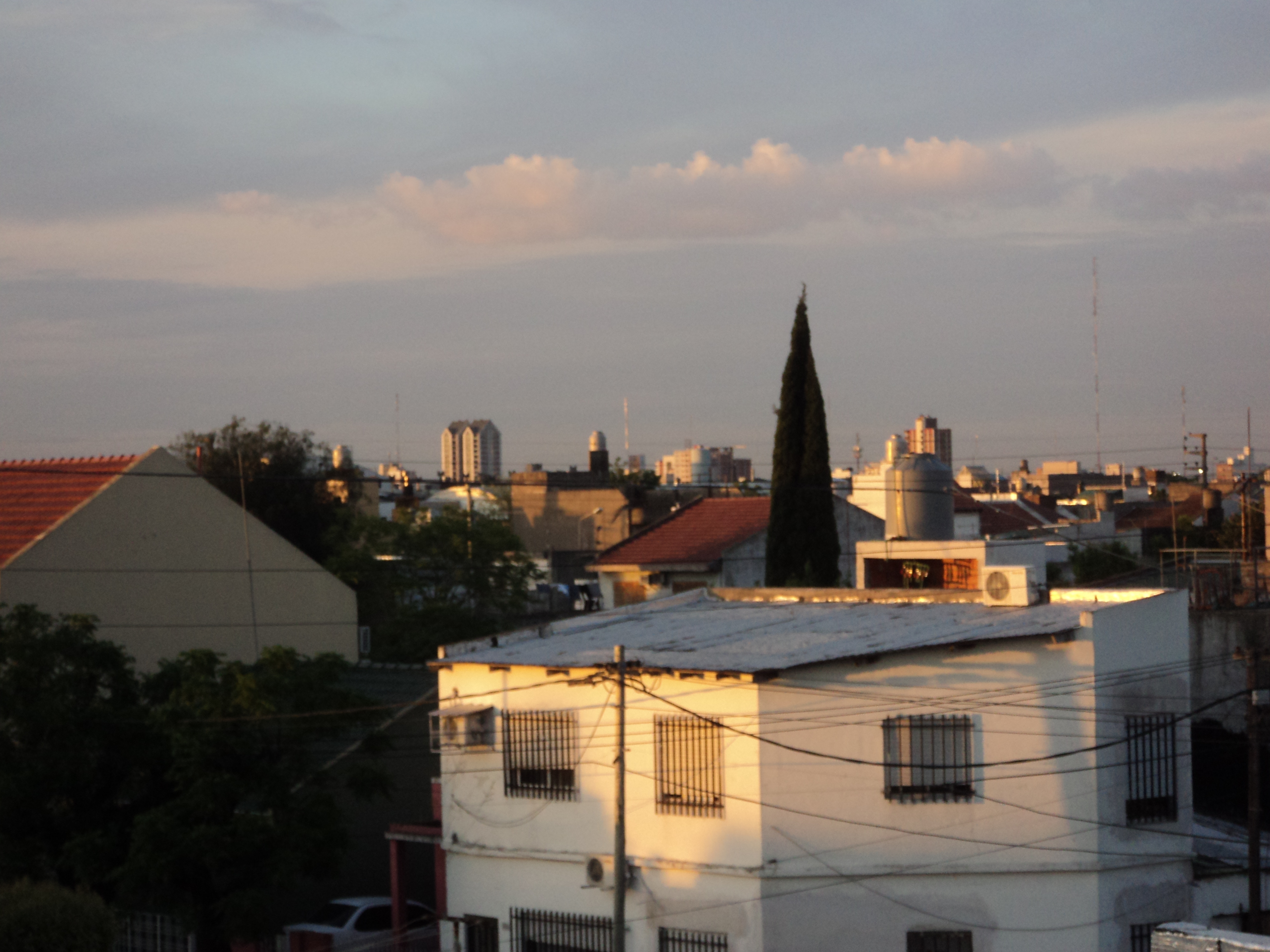
- View towards the city centre of San Justo from the residential area

- Location in Greater Buenos Aires Location in the Province of Buenos Aires Location in Argentina
- Coordinates: 34°41′S 58°33′W
- Country: Argentina
- Province: Buenos Aires
- Partido: La Matanza
- Founded: December 25, 1856
- Elevation: 26 m (85 ft)

Population (2001 census [INDEC])
  - Total: 105,274
  - Density: 6,958/km^{2} (18,020/sq mi)
- CPA Base: B 1754
- Area code: +54 11

San Justo is a city and the seat of government of La Matanza Partido, Buenos Aires Province, Argentina.

San Justo is a relatively prosperous city enjoying a variety of commercial and cultural resources. Its strategic location on National Highway 3 and Provincial Highway 4 (the Greater Buenos Aires beltway), make it among the most active, for its size, in the partido.

Pedro Bonifacio Palacios, an Argentine poet, was born in San Justo, and one of the main streets of the city is named in his honor under his nickname Almafuerte.

The Plaza San Martín is the center of La Matanza and its civic center, where the main institutions of the partido are located within a four-block radius.

== History ==
Magistrate Lino Lagos made the first applications in 1852 for the land needed to establish a capital city in La Matanza. It was not however until 1856 that the land was granted. José Gorchs, representing the heirs of Justo Villegas, proposed that the foundation took place in the lands they possessed and was willing to donate them to the community.

There they would build a municipality, a church, school and security management. The handed lots also included lands for the construction of a cemetery, a market and a residential area. On December 25, 1856, the city was founded on land requisitioned from Justo Villegas, a prominent landowner; at the request of the heirs of Justo Villegas, the city was named San Justo.

Melchor Romero was in charge of the demarcation of the village, it was adopted on November 13, 1857, by the Survey Department of the Province, thus being limited to a square league. The civic center was built in the Spanish Colonial form, with a park and the town hall, the church, the bank and the police station on each one of its sides.

The economy was based mainly on livestock and agricultural activity, the grain production being the most predominant. After 1852 there were some changes regarding the livestock activity such as cattle breeding being displaced by wool-bearing (preponderant until the late nineteenth century).

=== Society and Economy ===
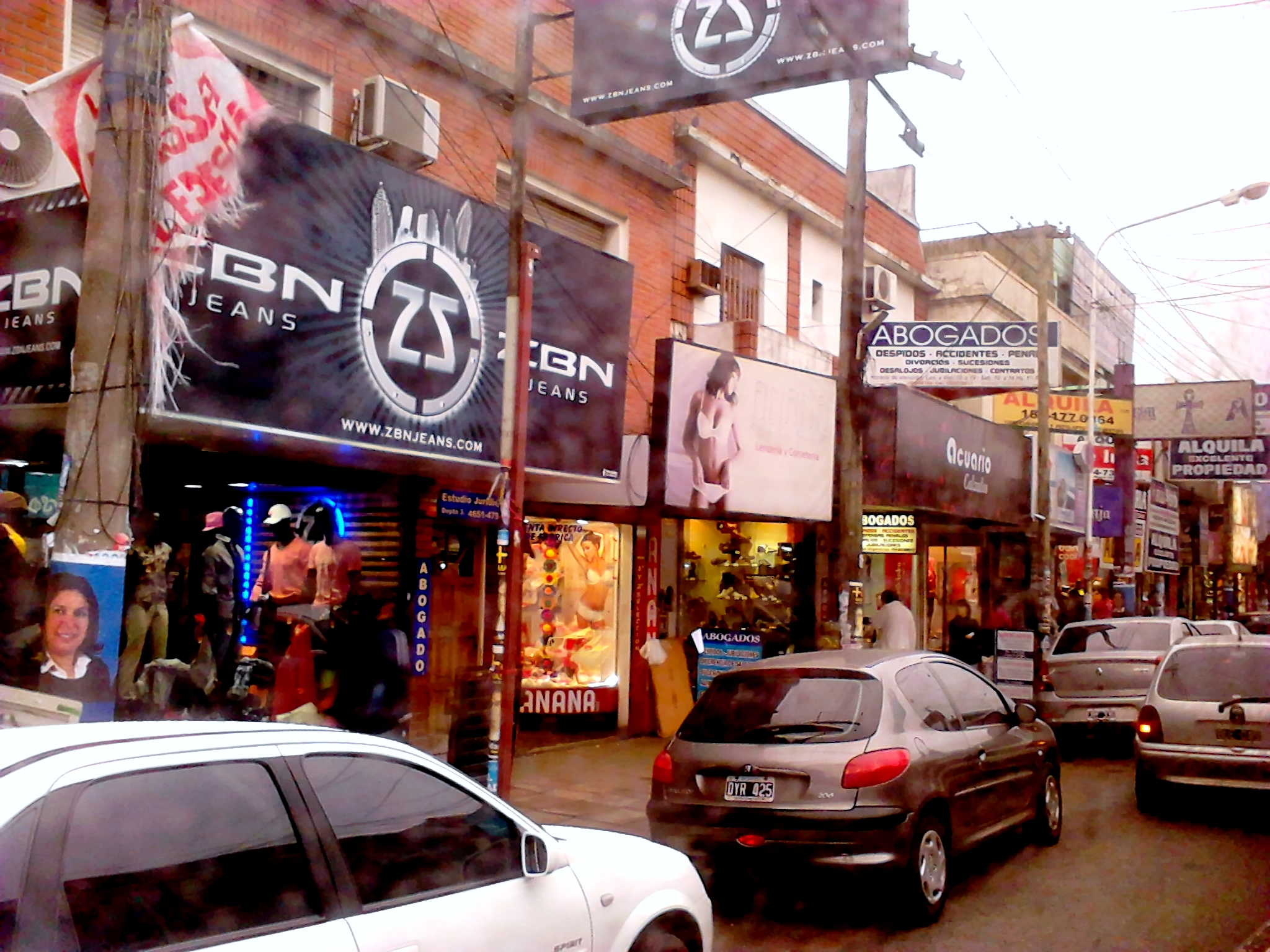
Avenida Arieta

San Justo became an important industrial center during the 1940s and 1950s. The city, however, suffered the loss of a sizeable portion of its industrial base after 1980. Shantytowns (referred to as villas miserias in Argentina) blight numerous abandoned lots in the city, particularly in the western half, though public housing efforts have been recently stepped up, a process of revitalization aided by the return of numerous industrial and wholesaling employers. Some of the largest employers in San Justo include an Acindar steel mill, construction materials maker Eternit, the Papelera Tucumán paper mill, and a former Siam di Tella machinery factory purchased in 1986 by the Pérez Companc Group. The city continued to grow and, as fewer than 20% live in substandard housing, most of its 36,000 households live in middle-class neighborhoods.

== Education ==
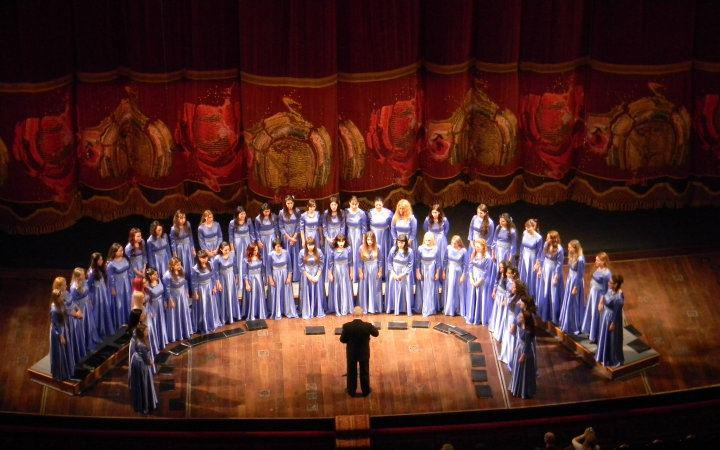
The San Justo Women's Chorus

San Justo residents avail themselves of numerous primary, secondary and tertiary schools, the best-known of which are probably the "Almafuerte" School, an award-winning public school, and the San Justo Parochial School.

The National University of La Matanza is located in San Justo, and is now a leading center for education, sports and cultural activities in the area.

== Notable people ==
- Sebastián Driussi (b. 1996), footballer
- Pedro Bonifacio Palacios (1854-1917), poet
- Lidia Elsa Satragno (b. 1935), entertainer and politician
- Franco Paredes (b. 1999), footballer
- Leandro Paredes (b. 1994), footballer
