= Ramos Mejía =

City in Buenos Aires Province, Argentina

- City
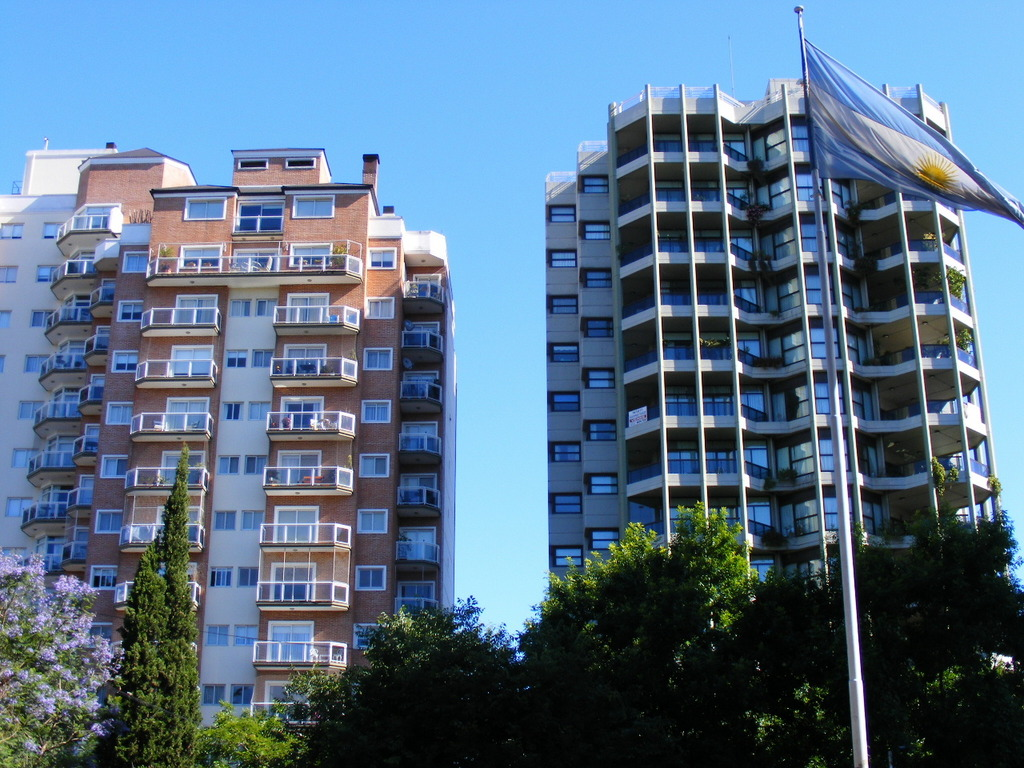
- Nickname: Town of commerce
- Location in Greater Buenos Aires
- Coordinates: 34°39′S 58°34′W
- Country: Argentina
- Province: Buenos Aires
- Partido: La Matanza
- Founded: 1871

Government
  - Type: Municipal council
  - Headquarters: Town Hall of La Matanza
  - Intendant of La Matanza: Fernando Espinoza (Front for Victory)

Area
  - Total: 11.9 km^{2} (4.6 sq mi)
- Elevation: 26 m (85 ft)

Population (2011)
  - Total: 98,547
  - Density: 8,280/km^{2} (21,400/sq mi)
- CPA Base: B 1704
- Area code: +54 011

Ramos Mejía (Spanish pronunciation: [ˈramos meˈxia]) is a city in La Matanza Partido, Buenos Aires Province, Argentina. The town has an area of 11.9 km^{2} (4.6 sq mi) and a population of 98,547. The city is one of the largest commercial districts in the Western area of Greater Buenos Aires.

== History ==
The land where the city is now located was originally purchased from Martín José de Altolaguirre by Francisco Ramos Mejía in 1808. Ramos Mejía was the son of a merchant from Seville, and had returned from a nine-year stay in the Upper Peru, where his business interests had met with success. The ranch became noteworthy as the site of the first public religious controversy in Argentina, when Ramos Mejía's differences over the interpretation of biblical canon with the local parish priest, Father Castañeda, led to the former's exile from the parish in 1821.

The property remained in name of wife, María Antonia Segurola de Ramos Mejía, who became its sole proprietor upon her husband's death in 1828. Confiscated by order of Governor Juan Manuel de Rosas in 1840, it was returned to the widow in 1853 following Rosas' overthrow. She bequeathed the land to her four sons in a living trust. They, in turn, sold the first lots to the Buenos Aires Western Railway, which opened the station at the site on September 25, 1858, along the nation's first rail line.

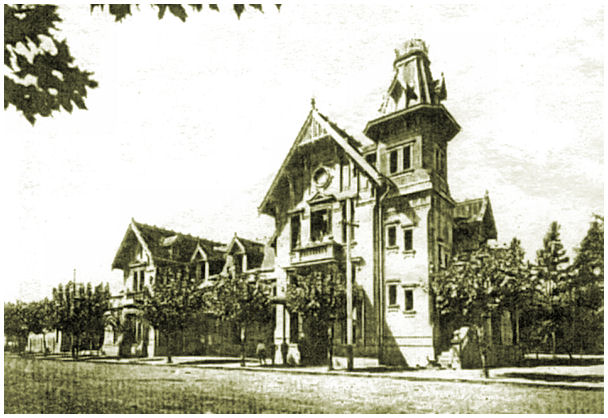
The Ramos Mejía Sarmiento Line station. Opened in 1907, the central building was converted to a museum in 2008.

Subsequent sales by the heirs, and its resale as parcels, led to the establishment of the town in 1871. Buoyed by the subsequent wave of immigration in Argentina, Ramos Mejía grew rapidly and in 1904, the cobblestone Avenida Rivadavia reached the town from Buenos Aires. The original station was replaced in 1907 by a larger structure designed by Dutch architect John Doyer; one of the most recognizable examples of Victorian architecture in Argentina, the building itself was converted to a museum in 2008.

Ramos Mejía would be the site of other milestones in the history of Argentine public transport. The establishment of the Transporte Ideal San Justo, a shared taxi company, in 1921, marked the birth of the popular transport service in Argentina (where they are known as colectivos). The electrification of the Western Railway line in 1923 between Ramos Mejía and the Once railway station terminal in Buenos Aires would be another first in the nation.

Among the most important educational institutions in the city are the Ward College, established in 1913, the Santo Domingo College (founded in 1915), and the Salesian Wilfrid Barón College of Don Bosco, established in 1930; one of its alumni was the future Pope Francis, who (as Jorge Bergoglio) studied here as a sixth-grader. The local Casa de la Cultura ("cultural house") houses the Leopoldo Marechal Theatre, one of the most important such establishments in La Matanza County. Ramos Mejía was officially recognized as a city by the Provincial Legislature on September 17, 1964.

The city is the birthplace of, among other well-known personalities in Argentina, comedian Antonio Gasalla, cyclist and olympic gold medalist Walter Pérez, former Vice President Carlos Ruckauf, Governor Daniel Scioli, screenwriter Damián Szifrón, and songwriter María Elena Walsh.

== Places of interest ==
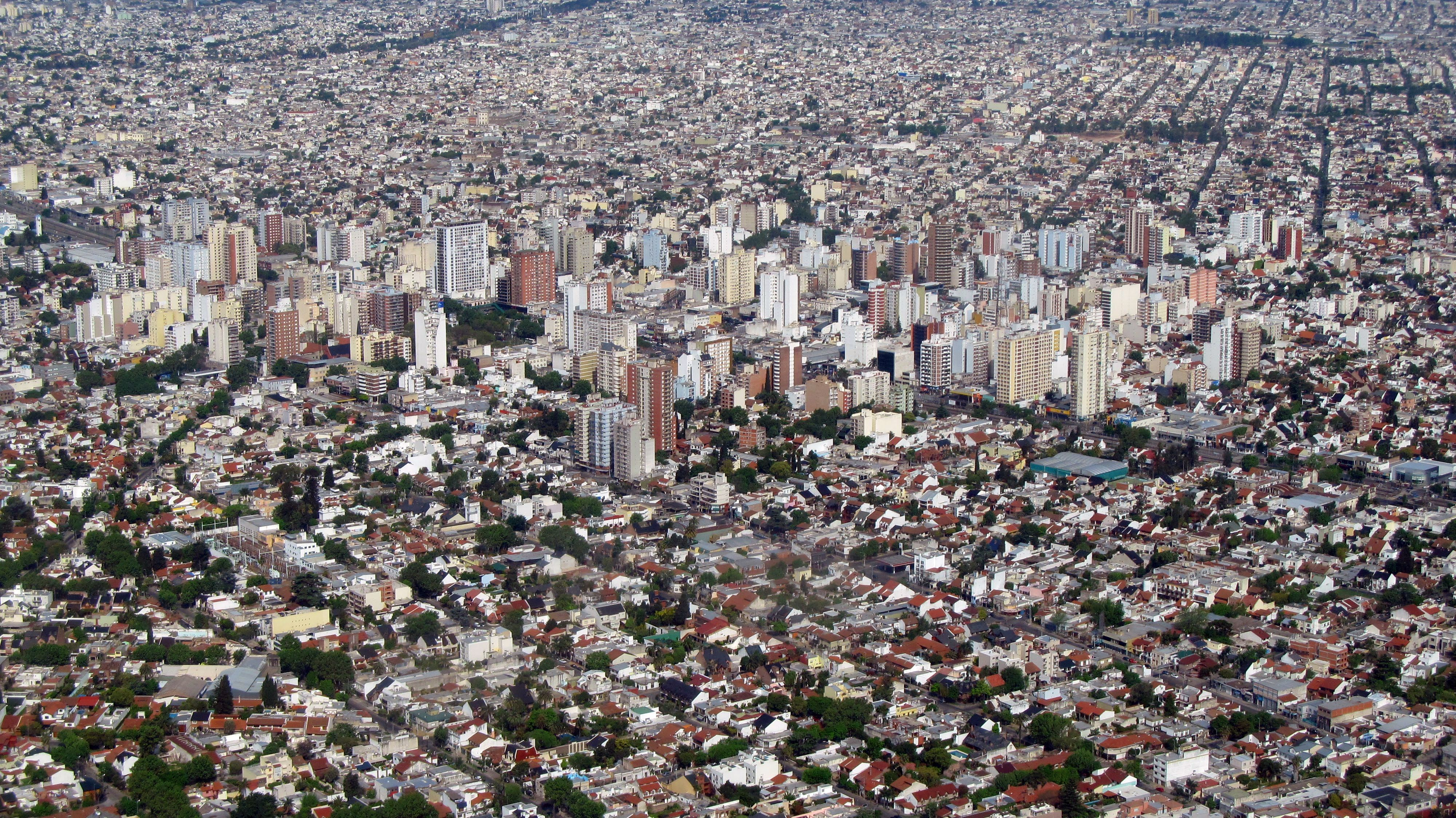
Aerial photo of Ramos Mejia

Ramos Mejía is located approximately 14 kilometres (8.7 mi) from the center of Buenos Aires (capital), and has rapid access through highways. Has many historical buildings, churches, and schools

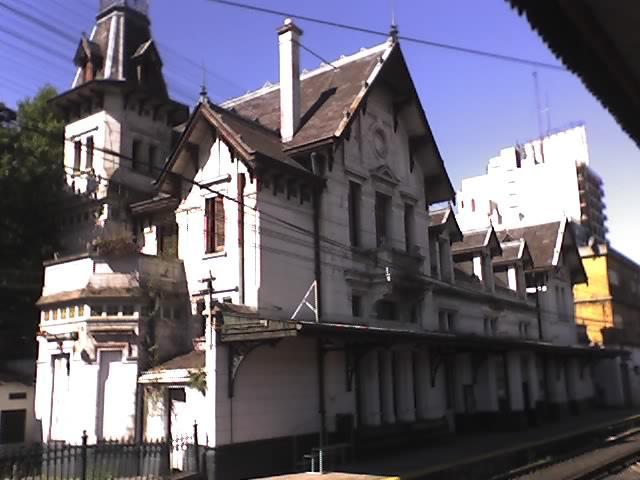
Ramos Mejia Train station

The Ramos Mejia Station: it's a city heritage, and the mansion next to the station has symbolic value, because it is the center of the history of Ramos Mejia. This building, from 1906 was designed and built by Dutch architect John Doyer (1862–1936), who designed and built also the Once railway station. The architecture design matches the late Victorian style.

== Education ==
=== Public schools ===
- School Nuestra Señora del Carmen (Elementary)
- School General José de San Martín (Elementary/High School)
- School José Manuel Estrada (Elementary/High School)
- School Bernardino Rivadavia (Elementary)
- School República de Brasil (Elementary)
- School Juan Bautista Alberdi (Elementary)
- School Hipólito Yrigoyen (Elementary)
- School Patricias Argentinas (Elementary)
- School Jorge Simon Liborio Muse (Elementary)
- School Sargento Cabral (Elementary)
- School General G. A. de Lamadrid (Elementary)
- School Alas Argentinas (Elementary)
- School República de Venezuela (Elementary)
- School José Félix Bogado (High School)
- School Santa María de Buenos Aires (High School)
- School Esteban Echeverria (High School)
- School Juan B de la Salle (High School)

=== Private schools ===
- School Nuestra Señora de Fatima (Elementary – High School)
- School Parroquial San Juan XXIII (Maternal – Inicial – Elementary – High School regular and technical – Tertiary)
- Institute Don Bosco (Elementary – High School)
- School Ramos Mejia (Inicial – Elementary – High School)
- School Santo Domingo (Kindergarten – Elementary – High School)
- Institute San Miguel (Inicial – Elementary – High School)
- School Santísimo Redentor (Elementary – High School)
- Escuela Argentina del Oeste (Elementary – High School)
- Escuela Jean Piaget (Elementary – High School)
- Institute Santo Tomás de Aquino (Kindergarten – Elementary – High School)
- Institute French (Kindergarten – Elementary – High School)
- School del Parque (Elementary – High School)
- Escuela Colina de la Paz (Elementary)
- Institute Sarmiento (High School)
- Institute Juan José Castelli (High School) — Closed in 2008 permanently
- School Guillermo de Orange – Orange Day School (Inicial – Elementary – High School)

== Notable people ==
- Luis Fabián Artime, soccer player
- Bizarrap, DJ and record producer
- Héctor Calcaño, actor
- Germán Delfino, soccer referee
- Mariano Donda, soccer player
- Leopoldo Federico, tango conductor
- Sabrina Garciarena, actress
- Antonio Gasalla, actor and comedian
- Christian Gómez, soccer player
- Araceli González, actress
- Diana Ingro, actress
- Verónica Magario, politician, Mayor of La Matanza between 2015 and 2019
- Jorge Minissale, rock musician
- Agustín Orión, soccer player (Boca Juniors)
- Gustavo "Cucho" Parisi, singer and musician, leader of Los Auténticos Decadentes
- Walter Pérez, cyclist
- Erica Rivas, actress
- Carlos Ruckauf, politician
- Damián Szifron, tv producer
- Fernando Tobio, soccer player
- Diego Urcola, Jazz Musician (trumpet)
- María Elena Walsh, writer and musician
