= La Matanza Partido =

La Matanza Partido de La Matanza
- Partido
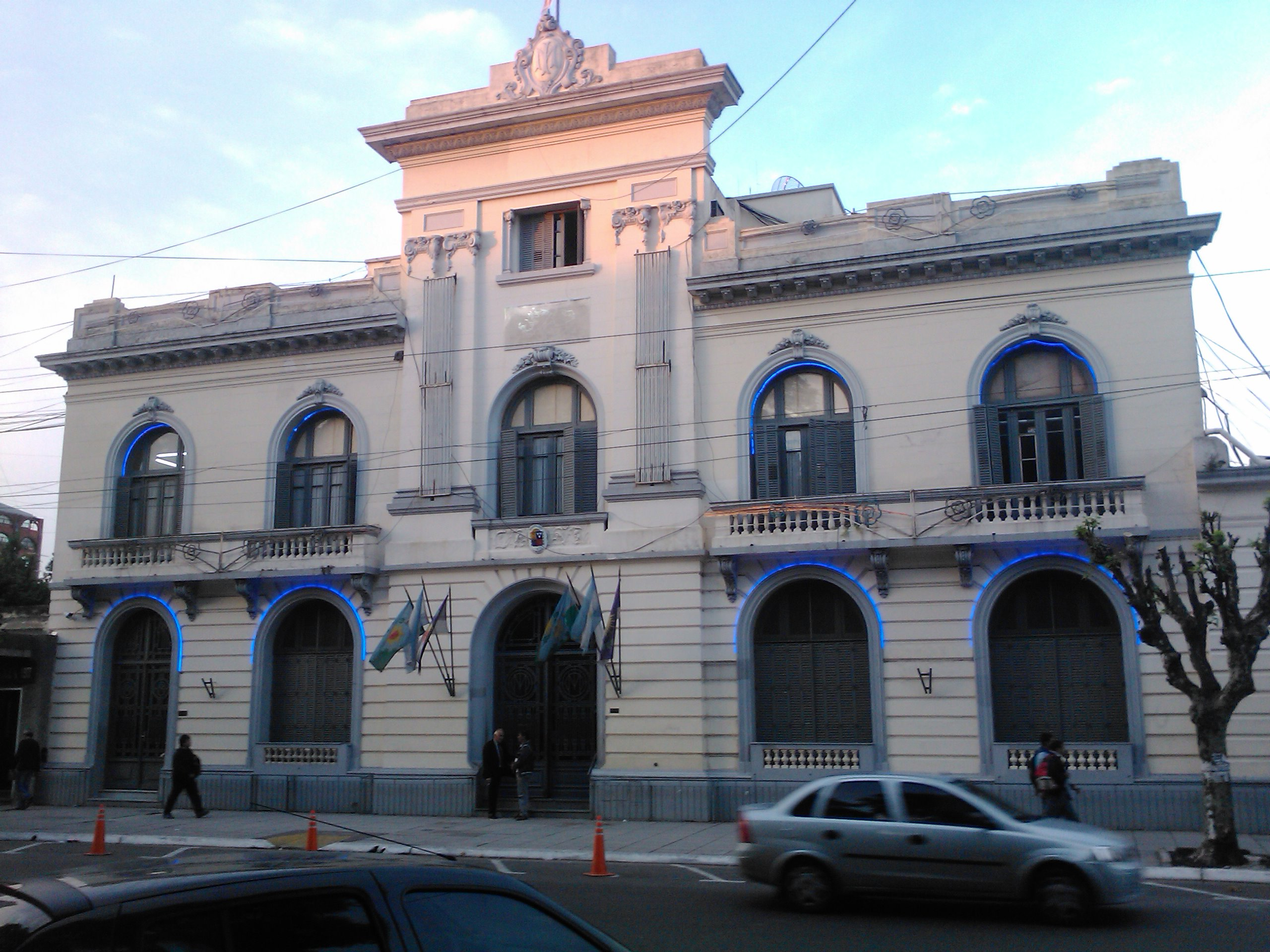
- La Matanza town hall in San Justo

- Flag Seal

- Location in Greater Buenos Aires and Buenos Aires Province
- Interactive map of La Matanza
- Coordinates: 34°43′S 58°38′W
- Country: Argentina
- Established: 1784
- Seat: San Justo

Government
  - Intendant: Fernando Espinoza (PJ-FdT)

Area
  - Total: 325.71 km^{2} (125.76 sq mi)

Population
  - Total: 1,775,272
  - Density: 5,450.5/km^{2} (14,117/sq mi)
- Demonym: matancero
- Postal Code: B1625
- IFAM: BUE065
- Area Code: 011 or 02202
- Website: www.lamatanza.gov.ar

La Matanza ('The Slaughter' in Spanish) is a partido (county or department) located in the urban agglomeration of Greater Buenos Aires, Buenos Aires Province, Argentina.

This provincial subdivision had 1,775,272 inhabitants (at the 2010 Census) in an area of 325.71 km^{2} (125.76 sq mi). Its capital city is San Justo, which is located around 16 km (10 mi) from the City of Buenos Aires.

== History ==
The origin of the name is uncertain. Is believed to reference a confrontation that Diego, the brother of conquistador Pedro de Mendoza, had with the Querandí tribe in 1536, where he and 22 soldiers that were with him died. This area and the river were named La Matanza (The Slaughter) probably in his name, sometimes using the plural form (Matanzas). The oldest document in which the name of La Matanza appears is dated 29 July 1603.

The partido was named Pago until 1730, then Partido de Matanza y Pozos (Partido of Slaughter and Wells): it was then a largely underpopulated rural area, and was led by a two-mayor system. In 1784, the partido was divided in two into La Matanza and Cañada de Morón (Morón Gully). In 1856, the capital city San Justo was founded.

In the 20th century, its population dramatically increased with the influx of the European immigration first and the internal migration later to the surroundings of the City of Buenos Aires, followed by migrants from neighbouring countries (mainly Bolivia and Paraguay) by the end of the century.

== Population ==
La Matanza population pyramid (2022 census)

According to the Argentine census bureau, the INDEC, the population was 1,121,298 in 1991, 1,255,288 in 2001 and 1,772,130 in 2010. With an estimate of over 2 million by 2020, it is the most populated partido in the Province of Buenos Aires and the most populated municipality in the country.

== Administrative subdivisions ==
La Matanza Partido is divided into sixteen subdivisions or localidades:

- Aldo Bonzi
- Ciudad Evita
- González Catán
- Gregorio de Laferrere
- Isidro Casanova
- La Tablada
- Lomas del Mirador
- Rafael Castillo
- Ramos Mejía
- San Justo (seat)
- Tapiales
- Veinte de Junio
- Villa Celina
- Villa Luzuriaga
- Villa Madero
- Virrey del Pino
