= Argentine Chamber of Deputies =

Lower house of the Argentine National Congress

Coordinates: 34°36′34.75″S 58°23′33.29″W

Honorable Chamber of Deputies of the Argentine Nation Honorable Cámara de Diputados de la Nación Argentina
- 2025–2027 Period

Type
- Type: Lower house of the National Congress of Argentina
- Term limits: None

Leadership
- President: Martín Menem, LLA since 10 December 2023
- 1st Vice President: Cecilia Moreau, FP since 10 December 2023
- First Minority Leader: Germán Martínez, FP since 1 February 2022
- Second Minority Leader: Cristian Ritondo, PRO since 10 December 2019

Structure
- Seats: 257
- Political groups: Government (95): LLA (95); Allies (24): PRO (12); UCR (6); MID (2); PyT (2); Adelante Buenos Aires (1); Por Santa Cruz (1); Independent (41): United Provinces (18); Innovación Federal (7); Independencia (3); Elijo Catamarca (3); País Federal (3); CC-ARI (2); Encuentro Federal (2); Defendamos Córdoba (1); La Neuquinidad (1); Primero San Luis (1); Opposition (97): FP (93); FIT-U (4)
- Length of term: 4 years

Elections
- Voting system: Party-list proportional representation D'Hondt method
- Last election: 26 October 2025 (127 seats)
- Next election: 24 October 2027 (130 seats)

Meeting place
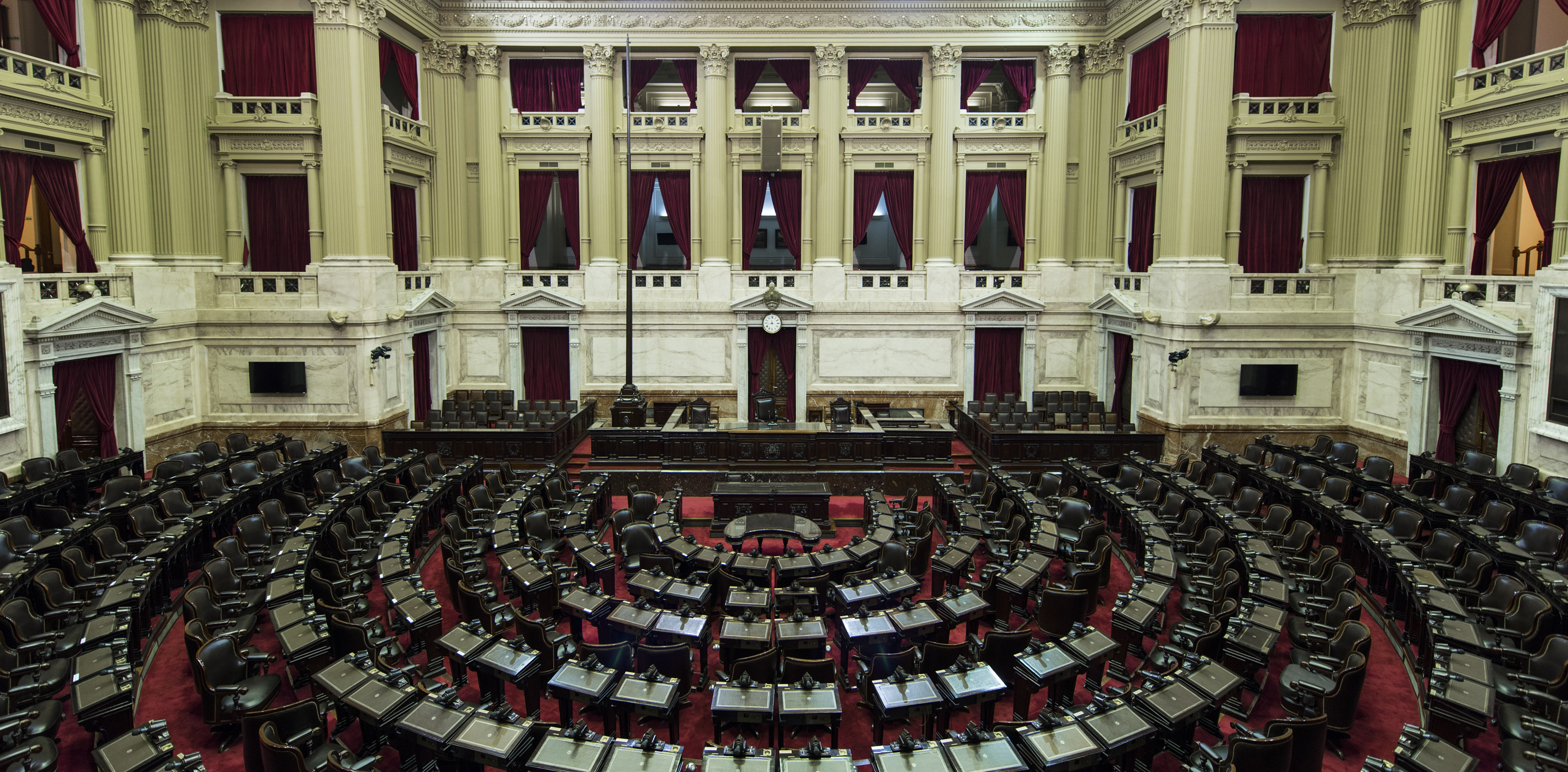
- Chamber of Deputies, Congress Palace, Buenos Aires, Argentina

Website
- hcdn.gob.ar

The Chamber of Deputies (Spanish: Cámara de Diputados de la Nación), officially the Honorable Chamber of Deputies of the Argentine Nation, is the lower house of the Argentine National Congress (Spanish: Congreso de la Nación). It is made up of 257 national deputies who are elected in multi-member constituencies corresponding with the territories of the 23 provinces of Argentina (plus the Federal Capital) by party list proportional representation. Elections to the Chamber are held every two years, so that half of its members are up in each election, making it a rare example of staggered elections used in a lower house.

The Constitution of Argentina lays out certain attributions that are unique to the Chamber of Deputies. The Chamber holds exclusive rights to levy taxes; to draft troops; and to accuse the president, cabinet ministers, and members of the Supreme Court before the Chamber of Senators. Additionally, the Chamber of Deputies receives for consideration bills presented by popular initiative.

The Chamber of Deputies is presided over by the president of the Chamber (Spanish: Presidente de la Cámara), who is deputized by three vice presidents. All of them are elected by the chamber itself.

== Current composition ==
It has 257 seats, and one-half of the members are elected every two years to serve four-year terms by the people of each district (23 provinces, and the Autonomous City of Buenos Aires), using proportional representation (list PR), D'Hondt formula, with a 3% of the district-registered voters threshold, and the following distribution:

=== By province ===
Province	Deputies	Population (2010)
Buenos Aires City	25	2,890,151
Buenos Aires	70	15,625,084
Catamarca	5	367,828
Chaco	7	1,053,466
Chubut	5	506,668
Córdoba	18	3,304,825
Corrientes	7	993,338
Entre Ríos	9	1,236,300
Formosa	5	527,895
Jujuy	6	672,260
La Pampa	5	316,940
La Rioja	5	331,847
Mendoza	10	1,741,610
Misiones	7	1,097,829
Neuquén	5	550,334
Río Negro	5	633,374
Salta	7	1,215,207
San Juan	6	680,427
San Luis	5	431,588
Santa Cruz	5	272,524
Santa Fe	19	3,200,736
Santiago del Estero	7	896,461
Tierra del Fuego	5	126,190
Tucumán	9	1,448,200

=== By political groups ===
127 of the current members of the Chamber of Deputies for the 2025-2027 period were elected in 2025, while the remaining 130 were elected in 2023. The governing party La Libertad Avanza, to which President Javier Milei belongs, is the largest parliamentary bloc, with 95 deputies, while the main opposition, Homeland Force, holds 93 deputies.

Bloc	Leader
La Libertad Avanza (95)	Gabriel Bornoroni
Homeland Force (93)	Germán Martínez
United Provinces (18)	Gisela Scaglia
PRO (12)	Cristian Ritondo
Federal Innovation (7)	Alberto Arrúa
Radical Civic Union (6)	Pamela Verasay
Workers' Left Front – Unity (4)	Myriam Bregman
Elijo Catamarca (3)	Sebastián Nóblega
Independencia (3)	Gladys Medina
País Federal (3)	Claudio Álvarez
Civic Coalition (2)	Maximiliano Ferraro
Encuentro Federal (2)	Miguel Ángel Pichetto
Integration and Development Movement (2)	Oscar Zago
Production and Labour (2)	Nancy Picón
Adelante Buenos Aires (1)	Karina Banfi
Defendamos Córdoba (1)	Natalia de la Sota
La Neuquinidad (1)	Karina Maureira
For Santa Cruz (1)	José Luis Garrido
Primero San Luis (1)	Jorge Fernández
Source: hcdn.gob.ar (last update: 14 December 2025)

== Requirements ==
Individuals elected to congress must be at least twenty five years old with at least four years of active citizenship. The elected individuals have to have been naturalized in the province in which they are being elected, or have at least two years of immediate residency in said province. (Art. 48 of the Argentine Constitution).

== History ==
The Chamber of Deputies was provided for in the Constitution of Argentina, ratified on May 1, 1853. Eligibility requisites are that members be at least twenty-five years old, and have been a resident of the province they represent for at least two years; as congressional seats are elected at-large, members nominally represent their province, rather than a district.

Otherwise patterned after Article One of the United States Constitution per legal scholar Juan Bautista Alberdi's treatise, Bases de la Constitución Argentina, the chamber was originally apportioned in one seat per 33,000 inhabitants. The constitution made no provision for a national census, however, and because the Argentine population doubled every twenty years from 1870 to 1930 as a result of immigration (disproportionately benefiting Buenos Aires and the Pampas area provinces), censuses were conducted generationally, rather than every decade, until 1947.

=== Apportionment controversy ===
The distribution of the Chamber of Deputies is regulated since 1982 by Law 22.847, also called Ley Bignone, enacted by the last Argentine dictator, General Reynaldo Bignone, ahead of the 1983 general elections. This law established that, initially, each province shall have one deputy per 161,000 inhabitants, with standard rounding; after this is calculated, each province is granted three more deputies. If a province has fewer than five deputies, the number of deputies for that province is increased to reach that minimum.

Controversially, apportionment remains based on the 1980 population census, and has not been modified since 1983; national censuses since then have been conducted in 1991, 2001, 2010, and 2022. The minimum of five seat per province allots the smaller ones a disproportionately large representation, as well. Accordingly, this distribution does not reflect Argentina's current population balance.

== Presidents of the Chamber ==
The president of the Chamber is elected by a majority of the Chamber's members. Traditionally, the presidency is held by a member of the party or alliance of the national executive, though exceptions have occurred, such as in 2001, when the Peronist Eduardo Camaño was elected president of the Chamber during the presidency of the radical Fernando de la Rúa. The officeholders for this post since 1983 have been:

President	Party	Term start	Term end	Province
Juan Carlos Pugliese	UCR	29 November 1983	3 April 1989	Buenos Aires Province
Leopoldo Moreau	UCR	26 April 1989	6 July 1989	Buenos Aires Province
Alberto Pierri	PJ	6 July 1989	1 December 1999	Buenos Aires Province
Rafael Pascual	UCR	1 December 1999	5 December 2001	City of Buenos Aires
Eduardo Camaño	PJ	5 December 2001	6 December 2005	Buenos Aires Province
Alberto Balestrini	PJ–FPV	6 December 2005	12 December 2007	Buenos Aires Province
Eduardo Fellner	PJ–FPV	12 December 2007	6 December 2011	Jujuy
Julián Domínguez	PJ–FPV	6 December 2011	4 December 2015	Buenos Aires Province
Emilio Monzó	PRO–C	4 December 2015	10 December 2019	Buenos Aires Province
Sergio Massa	FDT	10 December 2019	2 August 2022	Buenos Aires Province
Cecilia Moreau	FDT/UP	2 August 2022	7 December 2023	Buenos Aires Province
Martín Menem	LLA	7 December 2023	Incumbent	La Rioja (Argentina)

== Current authorities ==
Current leadership positions include:

Title	Officeholder	Party	Province
Chamber President	Martín Menem	La Libertad Avanza	La Rioja
First Vice President	Cecilia Moreau	Union for the Homeland	Buenos Aires
Second Vice President	Julio Cobos	Radical Civic Union	Mendoza
Third Vice President	Vacant	—N/a	
Parliamentary Secretary	Tomás Ise Figueroa	—N/a	
Administrative Secretary	Laura Emilia Oriolo	—N/a	
Coordinating Secretary		—N/a	

== See also ==
- Argentine Senate
- Politics of Argentina
- List of legislatures by country
