= Pedro Troglio =

Argentine football manager (born 1965)

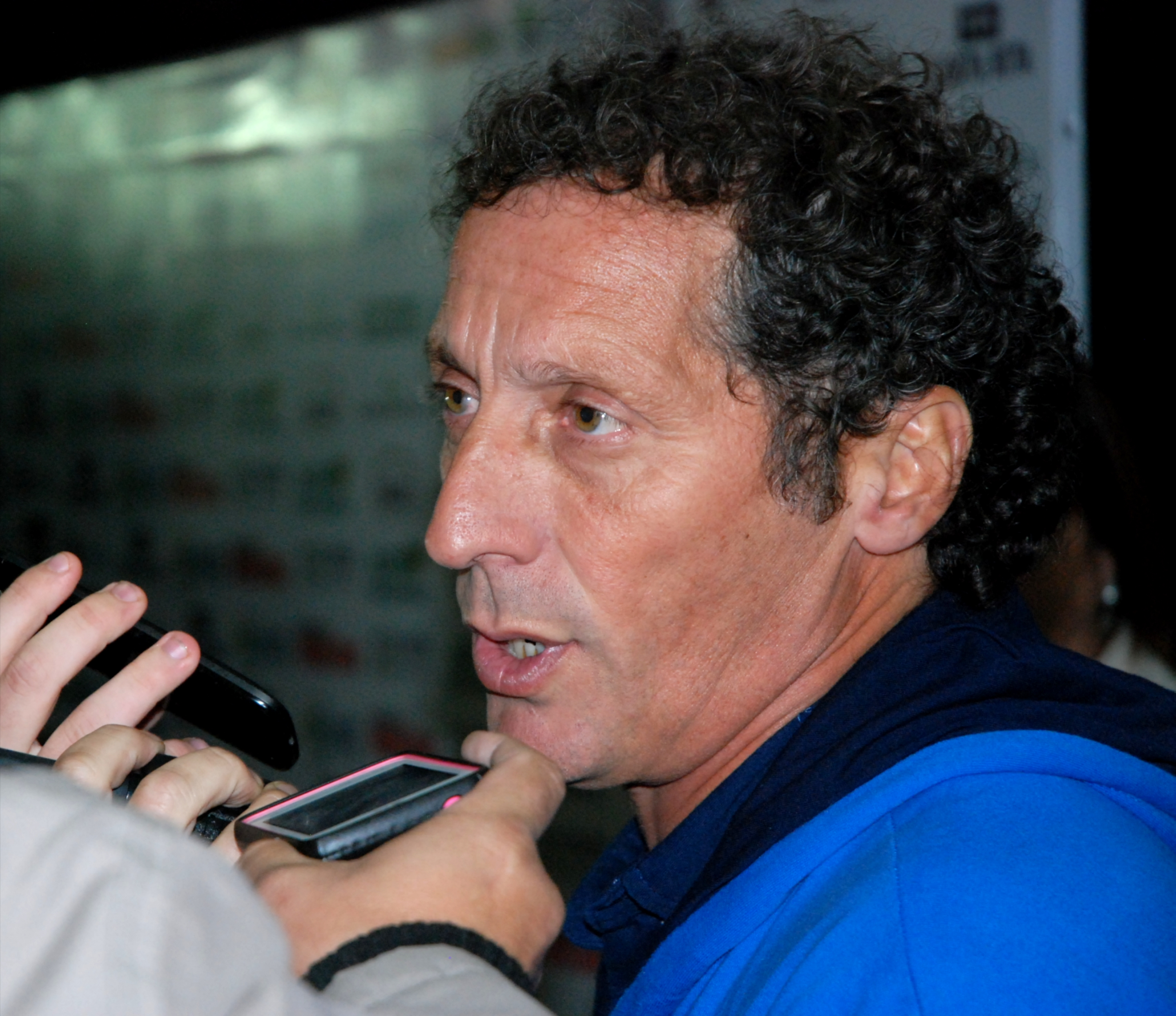

Personal information
- Full name: Pedro Antonio Troglio
- Date of birth: 28 July 1965 (age 61)
- Place of birth: Buenos Aires, Argentina
- Height: 1.72 m (5 ft 8 in)
- Position: Midfielder

Team information
- Current team: Banfield (manager)

Senior career*
Years	Team	Apps	(Gls)
1983–1988	River Plate	59	(3)
1988–1989	Verona	32	(1)
1989–1991	Lazio	40	(1)
1991–1994	Ascoli	106	(13)
1994–1996	Avispa Fukuoka	56	(20)
1997–2002	Gimnasia La Plata	124	(4)
2002–2003	Villa Dálmine	31	(4)
Total		448	(46)

International career
1987–1990	Argentina	21	(2)

Managerial career
- 2004–2005: Godoy Cruz
- 2005–2007: Gimnasia La Plata
- 2007–2008: Independiente
- 2008–2010: Cerro Porteño
- 2010–2011: Argentinos Juniors
- 2011–2016: Gimnasia La Plata
- 2016: Tigre
- 2017–2018: Universitario
- 2018–2019: Gimnasia La Plata
- 2019–2021: CD Olimpia
- 2022: San Lorenzo
- 2022–2024: CD Olimpia
- 2025: Instituto
- 2025–: Banfield
- * Club domestic league appearances and goals

Pedro Antonio Troglio (born 28 July 1965) is an Argentine football manager and former professional player who played as a central midfielder or defensive midfielder and is the current head coach of the Argentine Primera División club Banfield. A Copa Libertadores and Intercontinental Cup champions, Troglio also had a notable stint in the Argentina national team.

== Playing career ==
During his career as a footballer, Troglio played for River Plate, as well as at the 1990 FIFA World Cup with Argentina, where he scored a goal against the USSR.

He then spent the main part of his career in Italy, playing four seasons in Serie A (for Hellas Verona, Lazio and Ascoli) and two in Serie B.

During the final years of his career, Troglio played for Gimnasia y Esgrima de La Plata and Villa Dálmine (a fourth division team where he played alongside fellow veterans José Basualdo, Roberto Monserrat, Mario Pobersnik and Raúl "Pacha" Cardozo).

== Coaching career ==
Troglio then went on to coach Godoy Cruz de Mendoza in Primera B Nacional but he left in the middle of the tournament to take on in March 2005 a demoralized Gimnasia and helped keep the team in the Primera. The next season, he led them to 2nd place in the Apertura tournament, equalling their highest finish ever.

In June 2006 his #21 jersey was retired in Gimnasia y Esgrima de La Plata, being this the first number ever retired in an Argentine football club.

After the successful 2005 campaign, Gimnasia has performance declined markedly. Following a series of defeats in national and international competitions, including a 7:0 derby defeat to Estudiantes de La Plata, Troglio resigned in April 2007, and was temporarily replaced with former aide Ricardo Kuzemka. Nevertheless, Troglio's status with fans did not deteriorate strongly, with most press articles blaming club president Juan José Muñoz on the poor performances of the team.

In 2007, after Jorge Burruchaga's departure of Independiente, Troglio was hired to manage this institution. In March 2008, after an erratic season start, Troglio was sacked and replaced by Miguel Ángel Santoro.

In 2009, he won the campeonato Apertura with Cerro Porteño. On 30 May 2010 Argentinos Juniors hired the former Cerro Porteno coach to replace Claudio Borghi.

He stepped down as manager of Argentinos on 18 September 2011 after a bad start to the 2011–12 Apertura.

In 2019 he agreed to move to Honduras to manage CD Olimpia, the club with most titles in the country. He arrived to a team experiencing a 6-tournament drought, having won their last title in the 2015–16 Clausura. In 2019 Pedro and his team won the 2019–20 Clausura, ending a three-and-a-half-year stretch without winning the cup.

On June 2, 2022, he re-signed with former club CD Olimpia after a short period with Argentine club San Lorenzo.

== Career statistics ==
=== Club ===
Club performance			League		Cup		League Cup		Total	
Season	Club	League	Apps	Goals	Apps	Goals	Apps	Goals	Apps	Goals
Argentina			League		Cup		League Cup		Total	
1985–86	River Plate	Primera División	1	0					1	0
1986–87	River Plate	Primera División	23	1					23	1
1987–88	River Plate	Primera División	33	2					33	2
Italy			League		Coppa Italia		League Cup		Total	
1988–89	Hellas Verona	Serie A	32	1					32	1
1989–90	Lazio	Serie A	24	0					24	0
1990–91	Lazio	Serie A	16	1					16	1
1991–92	Ascoli	Serie A	32	4					32	4
1992–93	Ascoli	Serie B	38	6					38	6
1993–94	Ascoli	Serie B	36	3					36	3
Japan			League		Emperor's Cup		J.League Cup		Total	
1994	Fujieda Blux	Football League	0	0	1	0	-		1	0
1995	Fukuoka Blux	Football League	29	10	3	1	-		32	11
1996	Avispa Fukuoka	J1 League	27	10	1	0	14	2	42	12
Argentina			League		Cup		League Cup		Total	
1996/97	Gimnasia y Esgrima La Plata	Primera División	15	0					15	0
1997–98	Gimnasia y Esgrima La Plata	Primera División	6	1					6	1
1998–99	Gimnasia y Esgrima La Plata	Primera División	35	3					35	3
1999–2000	Gimnasia y Esgrima La Plata	Primera División	28	0					28	0
2000–01	Gimnasia y Esgrima La Plata	Primera División	13	0					13	0
2001–02	Gimnasia y Esgrima La Plata	Primera División	27	0					27	0
2002–03	Unión	Primera División	31	4					31	4
Country	Argentina		212	11					212	11
Country	Italy		178	15					178	15
Country	Japan		56	20	5	1	14	2	75	23
Total			446	46	5	1	14	2	465	49

=== International ===
Argentina national team
Year	Apps	Goals
1987	1	0
1988	3	1
1989	8	0
1990	9	1
Total	21	2

== Managerial statistics ==
As of match played 28 March 2026

Managerial record by team and tenure
Team	Nat	From	To	Record							
Team	Nat	From	To	G	W	D	L	GF	GA	GD	Win %
Godoy Cruz	(Argentina)	10 January 2005	27 March 2005	8	3	3	2	14	15	−1	37.50
Gimnasia La Plata	(Argentina)	2 April 2005	3 April 2007	85	38	16	31	116	127	−11	44.71
Independiente	(Argentina)	1 July 2007	24 March 2008	26	11	5	10	43	31	+12	42.31
Barcelona	(Ecuador)	1 July 2008	30 June 2009	41	15	12	14	41	36	+5	36.59
Cerro Porteño	(Paraguay)	1 July 2009	5 June 2010	59	29	13	17	83	64	+19	49.15
Argentinos Juniors	(Argentina)	6 June 2010	18 September 2011	51	15	21	15	51	49	+2	29.41
Gimnasia La Plata	(Argentina)	6 October 2011	14 March 2016	174	73	52	49	206	161	+45	41.95
Tigre	(Argentina)	23 March 2016	19 March 2017	26	8	10	8	32	28	+4	30.77
Universitario	(Peru)	22 March 2017	30 June 2018	58	23	21	14	89	73	+16	39.66
Gimnasia La Plata	(Argentina)	1 July 2018	17 February 2019	25	8	6	11	22	32	−10	32.00
C.D. Olimpia	(Honduras)	1 July 2019	31 December 2021	116	73	24	19	234	87	+147	62.93
San Lorenzo	(Argentina)	1 January 2022	14 April 2022	10	1	5	4	8	10	−2	10.00
C.D. Olimpia	(Honduras)	2 June 2022	31 December 2024	131	80	37	14	258	106	+152	61.07
Instituto	(Argentina)	1 January 2025	9 April 2025	13	4	2	7	13	15	−2	30.77
Banfield	(Argentina)	29 April 2025	present	30	12	4	14	33	37	−4	40.00
Total				837	378	231	228	1,243	869	+374	45.16

== Honours ==
=== Player ===
River Plate

- Argentine Primera División: 1985–86
- Copa Libertadores: 1986
- Intercontinental Cup: 1986
- Copa Interamericana: 1986

Avispa Fukuoka

- Japan Football League: 1995

Gimnasia y Esgrima La Plata

- Argentine Primera División runner-up: 2001-02

Villa Dálmine

- Primera C Metropolitana runner-up: 2002–03

Argentina Youth

- South American Games: 1986

Argentina

- FIFA World Cup runner-up: 1990

=== Manager ===
Cerro Porteño

- Paraguayan Primera División: 2009

C.D. Olimpia

- Liga Nacional de Fútbol Profesional de Honduras: 2019 Apertura, 2020 Apertura, 2021 Clausura, 2021 Apertura, 2022 Apertura, 2023 Clausura
- CONCACAF League: 2022
