= 1986 Copa Interamericana =

- Event: Copa Interamericana
Alajuelense	River Plate
(Costa Rica)	(Argentina)
0	3
- on aggregate

First leg
Alajuelense	River Plate
0	0
- Date: July 25, 1987
- Venue: Estadio Alejandro Morera Soto, Alajuela
- Referee: José Antonio Garza y Ochoa (Mexico)
- Attendance: 15,991

Second leg
River Plate	Alajuelense
3	0
- Date: August 16, 1987
- Venue: Estadio Monumental, Buenos Aires
- Referee: Juan Escobar (Paraguay)
- Attendance: 20,000

The 1986 Copa Interamericana was the tenth edition of the Copa Interamericana, the annual football match contested between the winners of the CONCACAF Champions' Cup and the Copa Libertadores. It was played over two legs between Alajuelense of Costa Rica and River Plate of Argentina. The first leg was played at Estadio Alejandro Morera Soto, Alajuela, on 25 July 1987 and the second leg was played on 16 August 1987 at the Estadio Monumental, Buenos Aires. Both teams were appearing in the competition for the first time.

The teams had qualified for the tournament by winning the two seasonal continental competitions. River Plate were the reigning champions of the Copa Libertadores, winning the 1986 final against Colombian team América de Cali 3–1 on aggregate. Alajuelense won 1986 CONCACAF Champions' Cup, beating Surinamese team S.V. Transvaal 6–2 over two legs.

A crowd of 15,991 observed the first leg at the Estadio Alejandro Morera Soto, which resulted in a goalless draw. Watched by a crowd of 20,000 at the Estadio Monumental, River Plate took the lead in the first half when Jorge Villazán scored. Juan Gilberto Funes extended their lead in the second half, and Héctor Enrique added one further seven minutes later. Following a 3–0 scoreline, River Plate secured their first Copa Interamericana.

== Background ==
The Copa Interamericana was an international competition, played between 1969 and 1998, which paired the champions of the South American tournament Copa Libertadores and the North American CONCACAF Champions' Cup to determine the best team in the Americas. It was specially relevant for the North American teams, as it was the highest international honour their side could achieve.

River Plate qualified for the match as the reigning Copa Libertadores winners. They had won the 1986 Copa Libertadores final by beating Colombian team América de Cali 3–1 on aggregate. They were making their first appearance in the Copa Interamericana.

Alajuelense qualified for the competition as a result of winning the 1986 CONCACAF Champions' Cup. They had beaten Surinamese side S.V. Transvaal 6–2 over two legs to become the first Costa Rican team to win a North American trophy. Therefore, they were making their first appearance in the Copa Interamericana as the first Costa Rican team to compete in the tournament.

== First leg ==
=== Summary ===
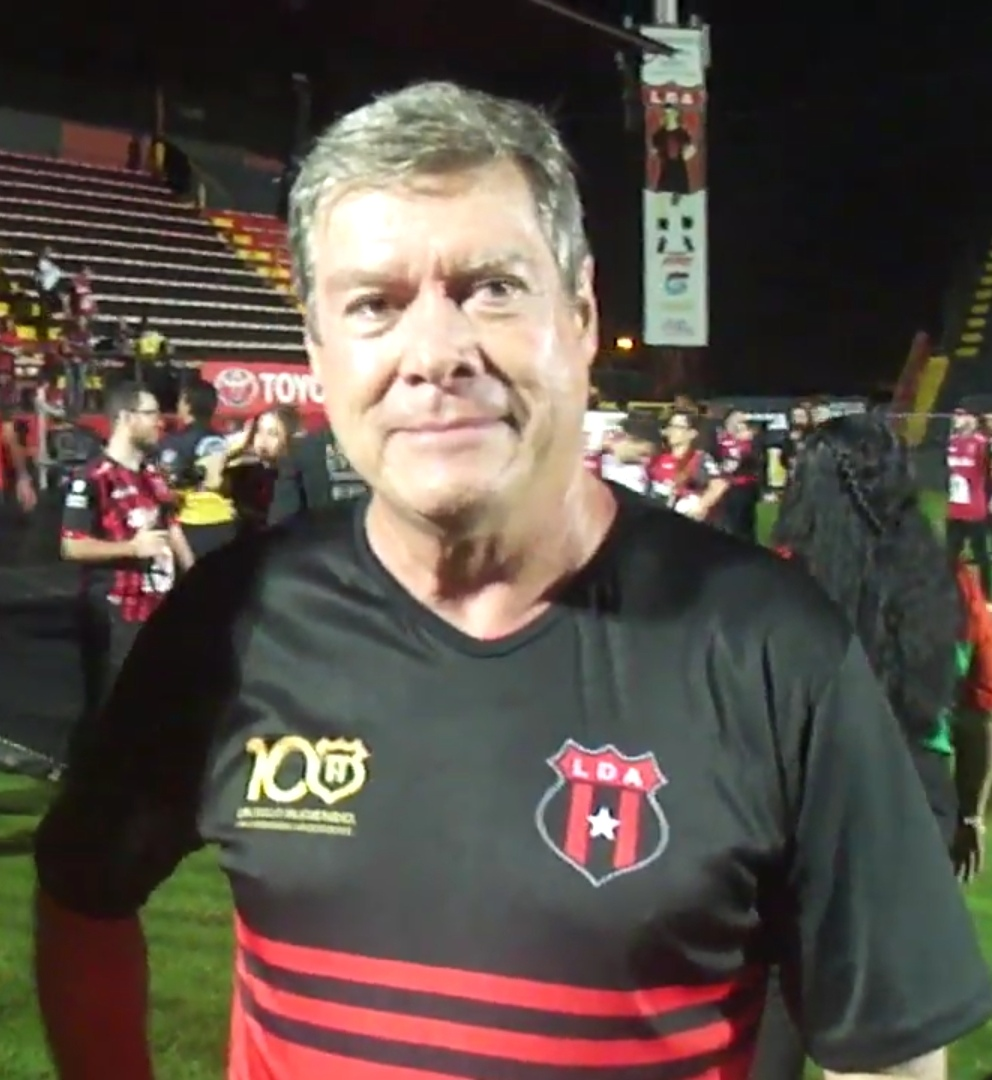
Goalkeeper Alejandro González withstood River Plate's offensive pressure.

The first leg was held at the Estadio Alejandro Morera Soto, the home ground of Alajuelense. River Plate manager Carlos Griguol fielded a 4–3–3 formation for the match, as he expected his team to be superior to their opposition. The hosts would reply with a defensive scheme. Nonetheless, Alajuelense stood up to the Argentine side, coming close on several occasions to the goal defended by Sergio Goycochea through Juan Cayasso, Álvaro Solano and Óscar Ramírez. They would be forced into a substitution in the 35th minute, when Miguel Ángel Vargas sustained an injury. Fellow defender Claudio Benavidez was his replacement. Although Alajuelense eventually abandoned their attacking approach, the visitors failed to deliver on their desired performance. River Plate had bettered their offensive efforts in the second half, creating numerous chances to open the scoring, but they ran into goalkeeper Alejandro González, who fended them off successfully and thus carried the tie into the second leg.

River Plate came away with a very different impression on Alajuelense, as their captain Américo Gallego later admitted: "What I liked most about the Costa Rican team was that they wanted to respect the spectacle and played toe-to-toe with our team. It was undoubtedly a very tough match". Carlos Griguol also praised Alajuelense on their showing: "The result doesn’t surprise me. I had heard about them and how well prepared they are."

Czechoslovak manager Josef Bouška addressed his team's performance, stating: "Costa Rican football can compete with that of any place in the world". Coming into the second leg, he further added: "We'll go to Buenos Aires with the mindset of performing well and avoiding a catastrophe."

=== Details ===
July 25, 1987

Alajuelense (Costa Rica)	0–0	(Argentina) River Plate
	Report

Estadio Alejandro Morera Soto, Alajuela
Attendance: 15,991
Referee: José Antonio Garza y Ochoa (Mexico)

Alajuelense	River Plate

GK	1	(Costa Rica) Alejandro González
DF		(Costa Rica) Miguel Ángel Vargas	(substituted off) 35'
DF		(Uruguay) Hernán Sosa
DF		(Costa Rica) Mauricio Montero
DF		(Costa Rica) José Carlos Chaves
MF		(Costa Rica) Álvaro Solano
MF	14	(Costa Rica) Ronald Mora
MF		(Costa Rica) Oscar Ramírez
MF		(Costa Rica) Juan Cayasso (c)
FW		(Costa Rica) Jorge Ulate
FW		(Costa Rica) Elías Arias
Substitutes:
GK		(Costa Rica) Carlos Porras
DF		(Costa Rica) Claudio Benavidez	(substituted on) 35'
DF		(Costa Rica) Ricardo Chacón
MF		(Costa Rica) José Mario Rodríguez
FW		(Costa Rica) Guillermo Guardia
Manager:
(Czechoslovakia) Josef Bouška

GK	1	(Argentina) Sergio Goycochea
DF	4	(Argentina) Jorge Borelli
DF	2	(Uruguay) Nelson Gutiérrez
DF	6	(Argentina) Oscar Ruggeri
DF	3	(Argentina) Alejandro Montenegro
MF	8	(Argentina) Néstor Gorosito
MF	5	(Argentina) Américo Gallego (c)
MF	10	(Argentina) Omar Palma
FW	7	(Argentina) Claudio Caniggia
FW	9	(Argentina) Juan Gilberto Funes
FW	11	(Argentina) Roque Alfaro
Substitutes:
GK	12	(Argentina) Alberto Vivalda
DF	13	(Argentina) Ernesto Corti
MF	14	(Argentina) Héctor Enrique
MF	15	(Argentina) Claudio Morresi
FW	16	(Argentina) Ramón Centurión
Manager:
(Argentina) Carlos Griguol

Assistant referees
Juan Pablo Escobar (Guatemala)
Rodolfo Martínez (Honduras)

== Second leg ==
=== Summary ===
At the Estadio Monumental, the home side decided to go all out from the start, taking an offensive approach. Alajuelense opted to sit back, looking to take advantage of any counter-attack prospects that arose. They managed to cancel their opposition out, steering clear of danger with Ronald Mora being the centrepiece of their defensive production, but would ultimately concede the opening goal in the 16th minute. Juan Gilberto Funes dribbled his way into the box and unveiled a low cross towards Uruguayan winger Jorge Villazán, who tapped the ball into the net. The renewed scoreline dealt a blow to the visitors' morale, as they struggled to get to the opposing area.

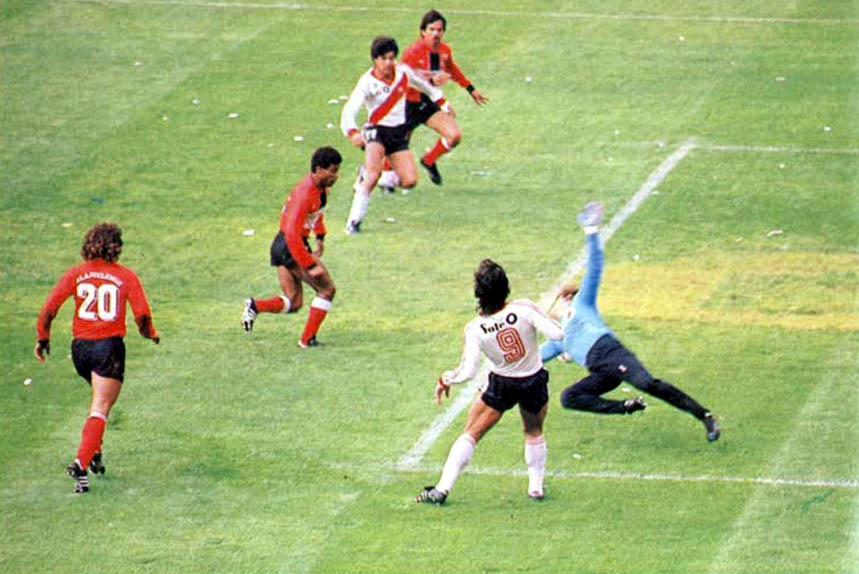
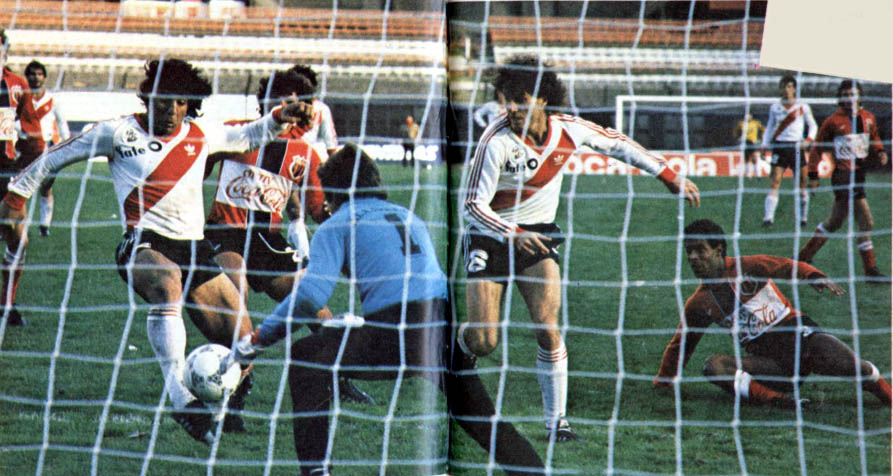
Juan Gilberto Funes' assist and goal that opened the scoring.

The home side came out strong again in the second half, as the course of the match remained unchanged. Even though Alajuelense increased their offensive efforts, powered by Juan Cayasso, River Plate's level of play and dominance prevailed, as they extended their lead at the 60-minute mark. Américo Gallego sent a cross over to Jorge Borelli, who headed it across the penalty area for Funes to pounce on. Shortly after, the home team switched wingers when Carlos Griguol replaced Villazán with Antonio Alzamendi. Just a minute later, a loft was sent by Héctor Enrique over to Ramón Centurión, who was tussling with his marker. Alejandro González shifted his focus to the struggle, not paying attention to the trajectory of the ball as it went into the goal, sealing the match with a 3–0 scoreline.

=== Details ===
August 16, 1987
15:35 UTC−3

River Plate (Argentina)	3–0	(Costa Rica) Alajuelense
Villazán 16'; Funes 60'; Enrique 67'	Report

Estadio Monumental, Buenos Aires
Attendance: 20,000
Referee: Juan Escobar (Paraguay)

River Plate	Alajuelense

GK	1	(Argentina) Sergio Goycochea
DF	4	(Argentina) Rubén Darío Gómez
DF	3	(Argentina) Jorge Borelli
DF	2	(Uruguay) Nelson Gutiérrez
DF	6	(Argentina) Oscar Ruggeri
MF	8	(Argentina) Héctor Enrique	Yellow card
MF	5	(Argentina) Américo Gallego (c)
MF	10	(Argentina) Omar Palma
FW	7	(Argentina) Ramón Centurión
FW	9	(Argentina) Juan Gilberto Funes
FW	11	(Argentina) Jorge Villazán		(substituted off) 66'
Substitutes:
GK	12	(Argentina) Alberto Vivalda
DF	13	(Argentina) Ernesto Corti
MF	14	(Argentina) Roque Alfaro
FW	15	(Argentina) Claudio Caniggia
FW	16	(Uruguay) Antonio Alzamendi		(substituted on) 66'
Manager:
(Argentina) Carlos Griguol

GK	1	(Costa Rica) Alejandro González
DF		(Costa Rica) Miguel Ángel Vargas	Yellow card
DF		(Uruguay) Hernán Sosa
DF		(Costa Rica) Mauricio Montero	Yellow card
DF		(Costa Rica) José Carlos Chaves
MF		(Costa Rica) Oscar Ramírez
MF	14	(Costa Rica) Ronald Mora
MF		(Costa Rica) Álvaro Solano
MF		(Costa Rica) Juan Cayasso (c)
FW		(Costa Rica) Elías Arias
FW		(Costa Rica) Jorge Ulate
Substitutes:
GK		(Costa Rica) Carlos Porras
DF		(Costa Rica) Claudio Benavidez
DF		(Costa Rica) Ricardo Chacón
MF		(Costa Rica) José Mario Rodríguez
FW		(Costa Rica) Guillermo Guardia
Manager:
(Czechoslovakia) Josef Bouška

Assistant referees
Asterio Martínez (Paraguay)
Lucio González (Paraguay)

== See also ==
- 1987 Copa Libertadores
- 1987 CONCACAF Champions' Cup
