= Patricio Hernández =

Argentine footballer and coach

Patricio Jose Hernández
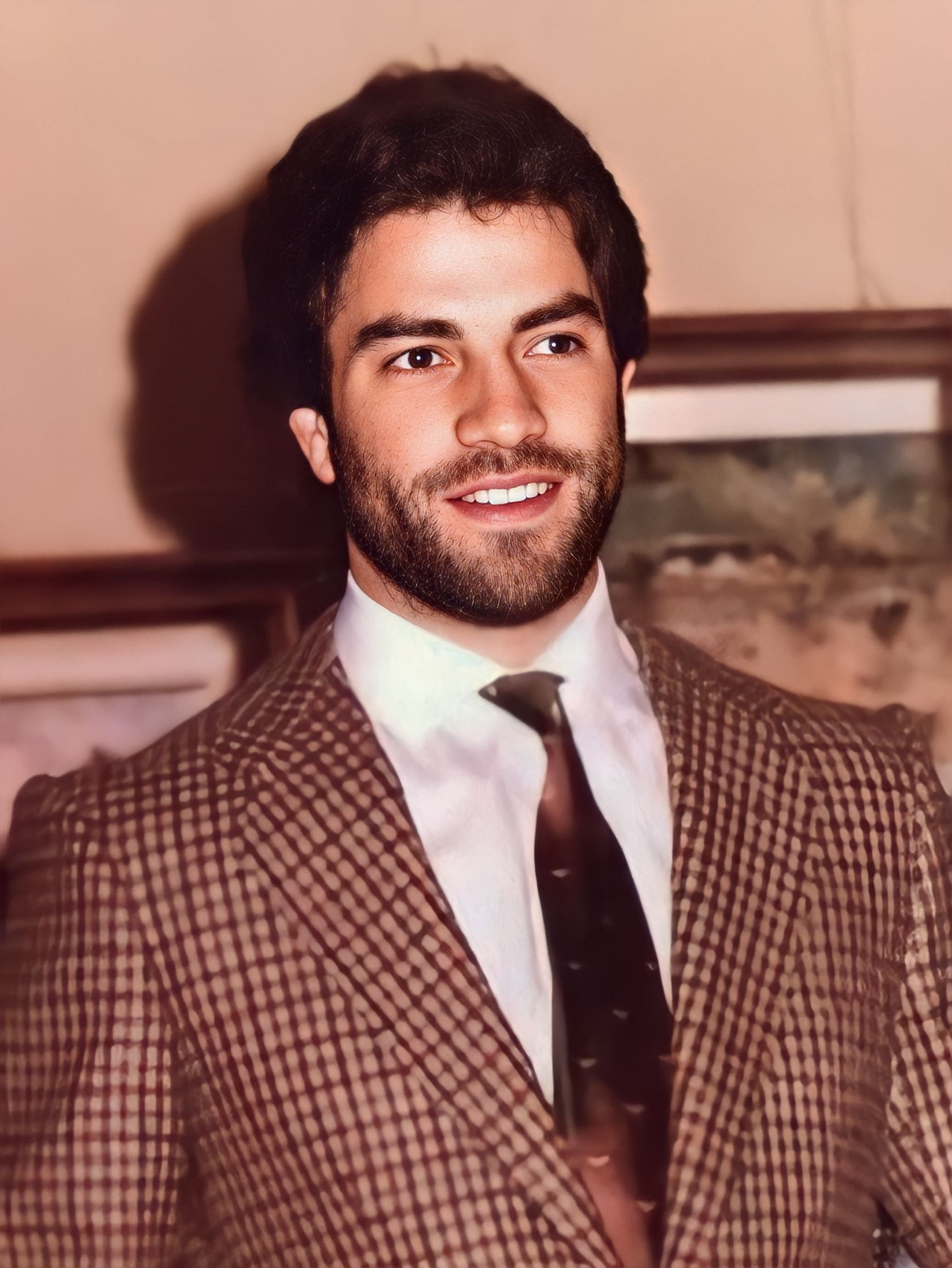
- Hernández while playing for Torino in 1983–84

Personal information
- Full name: Patricio José Hernández
- Date of birth: 16 August 1956 (age 70)
- Place of birth: San Nicolás de los Arroyos, Argentina
- Position: Midfielder

Senior career*
Years	Team	Apps	(Gls)
1974–1982	Estudiantes (LP)	198	(58)
1982–1984	Torino	57	(15)
1984–1985	Ascoli	26	(2)
1986–1987	River Plate	34	(12)
1987–1988	Argentinos Juniors	75	(32)
1989	Cruz Azul	37	(23)
1990–1991	Argentinos Juniors	31	(7)
1991–1992	Huracán	19	(2)
1992–1993	Instituto (C)		

International career
–1982–	Argentina		
- * Club domestic league appearances and goals as of 31 December 2006

Patricio Hernández (born 16 August 1956) is an Argentine football coach and former player.

Hernández started his career in 1974 at Estudiantes de La Plata, a club that he would later manage. He soon earned a reputation as a skillful attacking midfielder, with a very precise shot. He was transferred to Italian team Torino F.C. in 1982 for a then record transfer fee for Estudiantes. This record fee allowed Estudiantes to build an excellent roster, who won championships in 1982 and 1983.

Argentina coach César Menotti included Hernández in the 1982 FIFA World Cup squad as his third choice for creative midfielder, behind Diego Maradona and José Daniel Valencia. He did not manage to play any game in that tournament, though.

After the disappointment of going to, but not playing in, the world Cup, Hernández played for 2 seasons with Torino before moving to fellow Italian side Ascoli.

In 1985 Hernández returned to Argentina to play for River Plate. He was part of the team that won the Copa Libertadores in 1986. In 1987, he moved to Argentinos Juniors.

In 1989 Hernández moved to Mexico to play for Cruz Azul but he returned to Argentinos Juniors in 1990, he then had a season with Huracán in 1991-1992 and another with Instituto where he retired from playing in 1993.

Hernández has had a heretofar unsuccessful coaching career, including Estudiantes, Racing Club, and other teams in South America, mostly in Ecuador. In February 2007, Hernández was hired as coach of Club Atlético Banfield from the Argentine premiership, but he was fired March 16, 2007 after a home defeat to Estudiantes.

Hernández is also a respected football commentator with Argentine sports network Torneos y Competencias where he does in-depth tactical analysis, usually assisted with video clips and props.

He also has two relatives who have achieved huge success in other sports. His nephew Juan Martín Hernández is one of Argentina's biggest stars in rugby union and a fixture in the national team. His niece and Juan Martín's older sister María de la Paz Hernández is an Argentine international in field hockey.

== Honours ==
=== Player ===
Estudiantes

- Argentine Primera División: 1982

River Plate

- Argentine Primera División: 1985-86
- Copa Libertadores: 1986
- Intercontinental Cup: 1986
- Copa Interamericana: 1986

=== Manager ===
San miguel

- Primera D Metropolitana: 2014 Torneo Reducido

River Plate

- Argentine Primera División: 2000 Clausura
