= Roque Alfaro =

Argentine footballer and manager

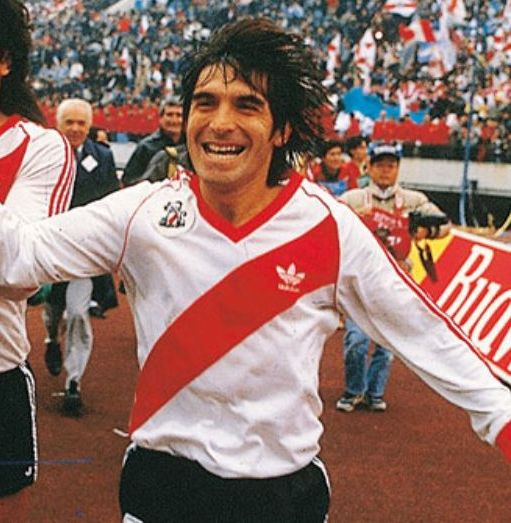
- Alfaro with River Plate in 1986

Personal information
- Full name: Roque Raúl Alfaro
- Date of birth: 15 August 1956 (age 70)
- Place of birth: Nogoyá, Argentina
- Position: Striker

Senior career*
Years	Team	Apps	(Gls)
1975–1980	Newell's Old Boys	274 (total)	(71)
1980–1981	Panathinaikos	10	(2)
1981–1983	América de Cali	92	(29)
1984–1987	River Plate	112	(13)
1987–1990	Newell's Old Boys	(see above)	(?)
1990–1992	O'Higgins	70	(10)
Total		558	(125)

International career
1987	Argentina	5	(0)

Managerial career
- 1993: Newell's Old Boys
- 1995: Quilmes
- 1996: O'Higgins
- 1997–1998: Platense
- 2000: River Plate (assistant)
- 2000–2002: Emelec
- 2002: Independiente (assistant)
- 2003–2004: Olmedo
- 2005: The Strongest
- 2005: Libertad
- 2006: San Martín de San Juan
- 2006: Independiente Rivadavia
- 2007: Talleres de Perico
- 2007: Juventud Antoniana
- 2007: Macará
- 2007: Fénix
- 2009: Total Chalaco
- 2010: San Martín de Mendoza
- 2011: Textil Mandiyú
- 2011: Alianza Atlético
- 2011: Racing Montevideo
- 2011–2012: Platense
- 2012: Atlético Uruguay
- 2012: Olmedo
- 2013: Talleres de Perico
- 2015: Platense
- 2017: Guastatoya
- * Club domestic league appearances and goals

Roque Raúl Alfaro (born 15 August 1956) is an Argentine former professional football player and former manager who played as a striker.

== Playing career ==
Alfaro started his professional career with Newell's Old Boys in the mid-1970s. In 1981, he was signed by Panathinaikos in Greece, and he played under the Greek surname Bistakis. He returned to South America later that year to play for América de Cali in Colombia where he won two league championships.

In 1983, he returned to Argentina to play for River Plate, he was part of the championship winning team of 1895-1986 and helped the team to win their first ever Copa Libertadores in 1986. The club also won the less prestigious Copa Interamericana during his time at the club.

He was selected to play for Argentina in the Copa América 1987. In 1987, he returned to Newell's Old Boys where he won another league title in 1987–1988. Towards the end of his playing career he had a spell in Chile playing for O'Higgins until his retirement in 1992.

== Managerial career ==
Alfaro has had spells as manager of Newell's Old Boys, Platense, Independiente Rivadavia San Martín de San Juan, Textil Mandiyú, Talleres de Perico, among others, in Argentina. Outside Argentina he has taken charge of O'Higgins in Chile, The Strongest in Bolivia, Libertad in Paraguay, Macará and Olmedo in Ecuador where he led the team to promotion by winning the Ecuadorian Serie B in 2003, Alianza Atlético in Peru, among others.

== Honours ==
=== Player ===
América de Cali

- Categoría Primera A: 1982, 1983

River Plate

- Argentine Primera División: 1985–86
- Copa Libertadores: 1986
- Copa Intercontinental: 1986
- Copa Interamericana: 1986

Newell's Old Boys

- Argentine Primera División: 1987–88
- Copa Libertadores runner-up: 1988

=== Manager ===
C.D. Olmedo

- Ecuadorian Serie B: 2003
