= Alejandro Montenegro =

Argentine footballer

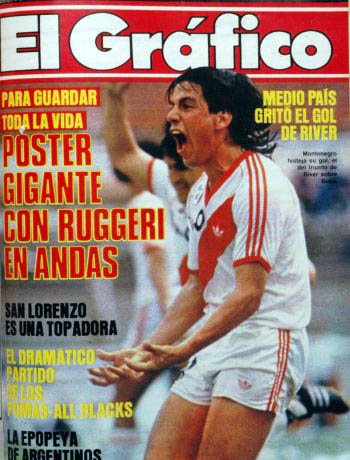
- Montenegro with River Plate in 1985, after making a notable goal against rivals Boca Juniors

Personal information
- Full name: Alejandro Alfredo Montenegro
- Date of birth: 2 September 1963 (age 63)
- Place of birth: Buenos Aires, Argentina
- Position: Defender

Senior career*
Years	Team	Apps	(Gls)
1983–1988	River Plate	85	(4)
1984	Chacarita Juniors	42	(0)
1988–1990	Talleres de Córdoba	46	(0)
1990–1992	San Lorenzo	58	(1)
1992–1993	Belgrano	15	(1)
1993–1994	Talleres de Córdoba	23	(0)
- * Club domestic league appearances and goals

Alejandro Alfredo Montenegro (born 2 September 1963) is an Argentine former professional football player who played as a left-back having a notable stint in River Plate, club where he made his official debut in 1983.

== Club career ==
Montenegro made his debut with River Plate in 1983. He then played for Chacarita Juniors in 1984 before returning to River Plate. He remained at the club for four years, winning four titles. Montenegro then went on to play for Talleres, San Lorenzo and Belgrano.

== Honours ==
River Plate

- Argentine Primera División: 1985–86
- Copa Libertadores: 1986
- Intercontinental Cup: 1986
- Copa Interamericana: 1986
