= Jorge Gordillo =

Argentine footballer

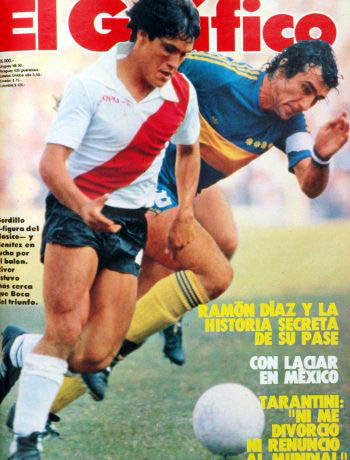
- Gordillo in 1982

Personal information
- Full name: Jorge Manuel Gordillo
- Date of birth: 27 January 1962 (age 64)
- Place of birth: Buenos Aires, Argentina
- Position: Defender

Senior career*
Years	Team	Apps	(Gls)
1981–1992	River Plate	232	(4)
1992–1995	Independiente	28	(1)
- * Club domestic league appearances and goals

Jorge Manuel Gordillo (born 27 January 1962) is an Argentine former footballer who played as a defender.

== Career ==
Gordillo made his debut with River Plate in 1981. He played at the club for 11 years, winning six titles.

In 1992, he joined Independiente, where he played for another three years, winning the 1994 Clausura and the 1994 Supercopa Libertadores.

== Honours ==
=== Club ===
River Plate

- Argentine Primera División: 1981 Nacional, 1985–86, 1989–90, 1991 Apertura
- Copa Libertadores: 1986
- Intercontinental Cup: 1986

Independiente

- Argentine Primera División: 1994 Clausura
- Supercopa Libertadores: 1994
