= Néstor Gorosito =

Argentine footballer & manager (born 1964)

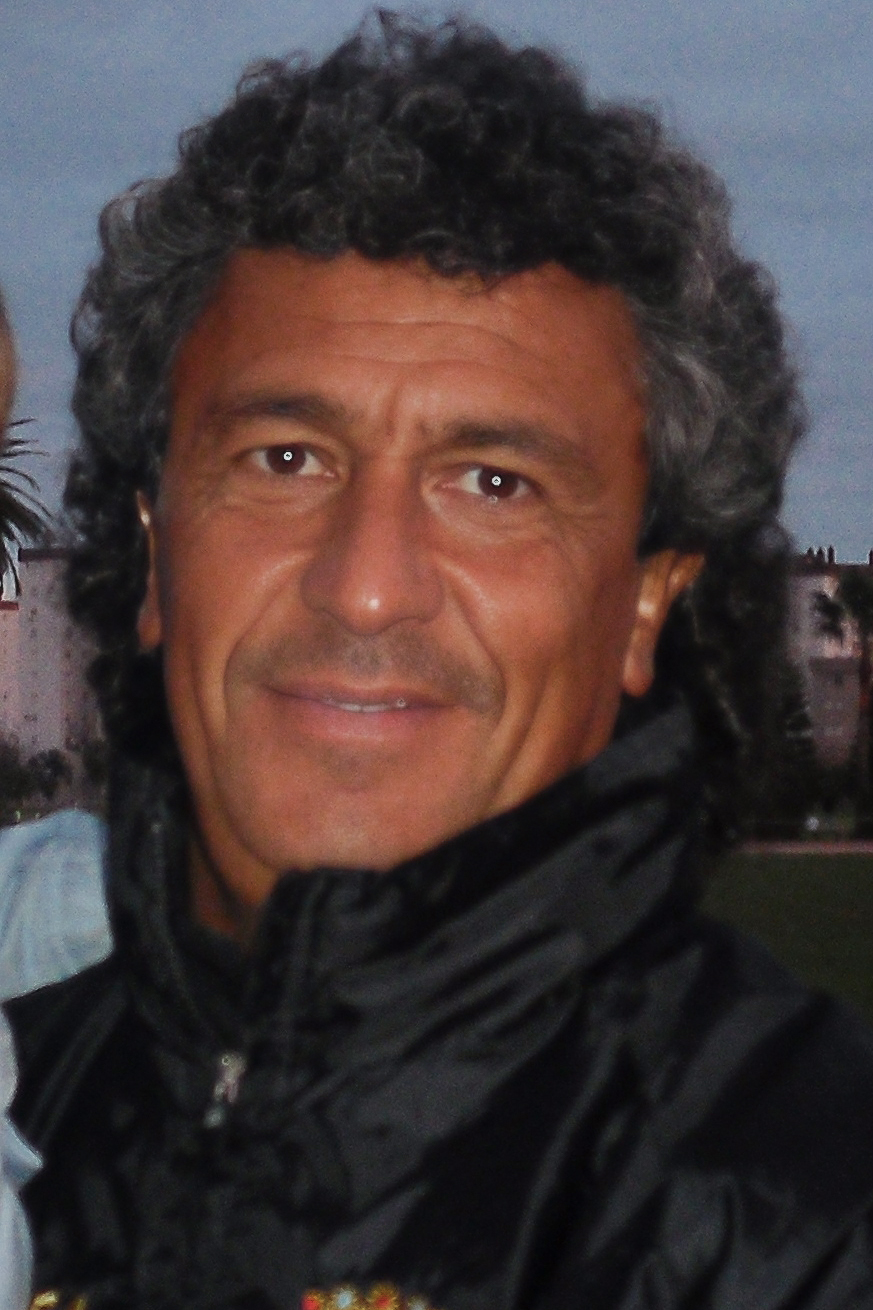
- Gorosito as manager of Xerez in 2010

Personal information
- Full name: Néstor Raúl Gorosito
- Date of birth: 14 May 1964 (age 62)
- Place of birth: San Fernando, Argentina
- Height: 1.77 m (5 ft 10 in)
- Position: Midfielder

Senior career*
Years	Team	Apps	(Gls)
1982–1988	River Plate	109	(8)
1988–1994	San Lorenzo	110	(36)
1989–1992	→ Swarovski Tirol (loan)	56	(16)
1994–1995	Universidad Católica	58	(12)
1996	Yokohama Marinos	6	(3)
1997–1999	San Lorenzo	99	(29)
1999–2001	Universidad Católica	39	(1)
Total		477	(105)

International career
1989–1997	Argentina	19	(1)

Managerial career
- 2002–2003: Nueva Chicago
- 2003–2004: San Lorenzo
- 2005: Lanús
- 2006–2007: Rosario Central
- 2007–2008: Argentinos Juniors
- 2009: River Plate
- 2010: Xerez
- 2011–2012: Argentinos Juniors
- 2012–2013: Tigre
- 2015: Argentinos Juniors
- 2015–2016: Almería
- 2017–2018: San Martín (SJ)
- 2019–2020: Tigre
- 2020–2021: Olimpia
- 2021–2022: Gimnasia La Plata
- 2023: Colón
- 2024: Tigre
- 2025: Alianza Lima
- 2026: San Lorenzo
Medal record
Representing Argentina
Copa América
Winner	1993 Ecuador	Team
CONMEBOL–UEFA Cup of Champions
Winner	1993 Argentina	Team
- * Club domestic league appearances and goals

Néstor Raúl "Pipo" Gorosito (born 14 May 1964) is an Argentine football manager and former player who played as a midfielder.

== Playing career ==
Néstor Pipo Gorosito began his playing career at River Plate, and subsequently had 3 spells at San Lorenzo where he scored 72 goals in 241 appearances. His other main club was Chile's Universidad Católica, where he contributed with 149 appearances and retired with the side in 2000.

Gorosito had a spell playing for Swarovski Tirol in Austria between 1989 and 1991, and in Japan with Yokohama Marinos in 1996. He also made 19 appearances for Argentina national team between 1989 and 1997.

== Managerial history ==
Gorosito started his managerial career at Nueva Chicago in 2003, avoiding relegation with the side in the play-offs. He was subsequently appointed at San Lorenzo de Almagro, but was sacked in 2004 after a poor run of results.

In 2005, Gorosito was named Lanús manager, but his reign only lasted two months. He was appointed at the helm of Rosario Central in the following year, being relieved from his duties in March 2007.

In 2008, Gorosito guided Argentinos Juniors to a qualification for that year's Copa Sudamericana, the club's first international tournament since 1996 Supercopa Sudamericana. Appointed by River Plate on 8 December 2008, he resigned on 4 October 2009 after underachieving in both Copa Libertadores and Primera División.

On 19 January 2010, Gorosito was named Xerez CD manager, with the side being dead last in La Liga. Despite suffering relegation, he achieved seven wins out of 19 matches, but left the club in July after failing to agree a new deal.

In September 2011, Gorosito returned to Argentinos Juniors, but resigned on 28 February of the following year, after suffering intestinal damage and a fractured vertebra in a car crash hours before his team lost against San Lorenzo. On 23 October 2012 he was appointed manager of Tigre.

Gorosito took Tigre to the final of 2012 Copa Sudamericana, but stepped down from his role on 6 July 2013 after having altercations with the club's board. In October 2014, he returned to Argentinos, taking the club back to the first division at first attempt.

On 23 December 2015, Gorosito was appointed manager of UD Almería, ranked last in Segunda División. On 16 May of the following year, he was sacked after his side was still in the relegation zone.

== Personal life ==
Gorosito has also worked in TV, as a consultant manager during 2005, on Fox Sports Latin America.

== Career statistics ==
=== Club ===
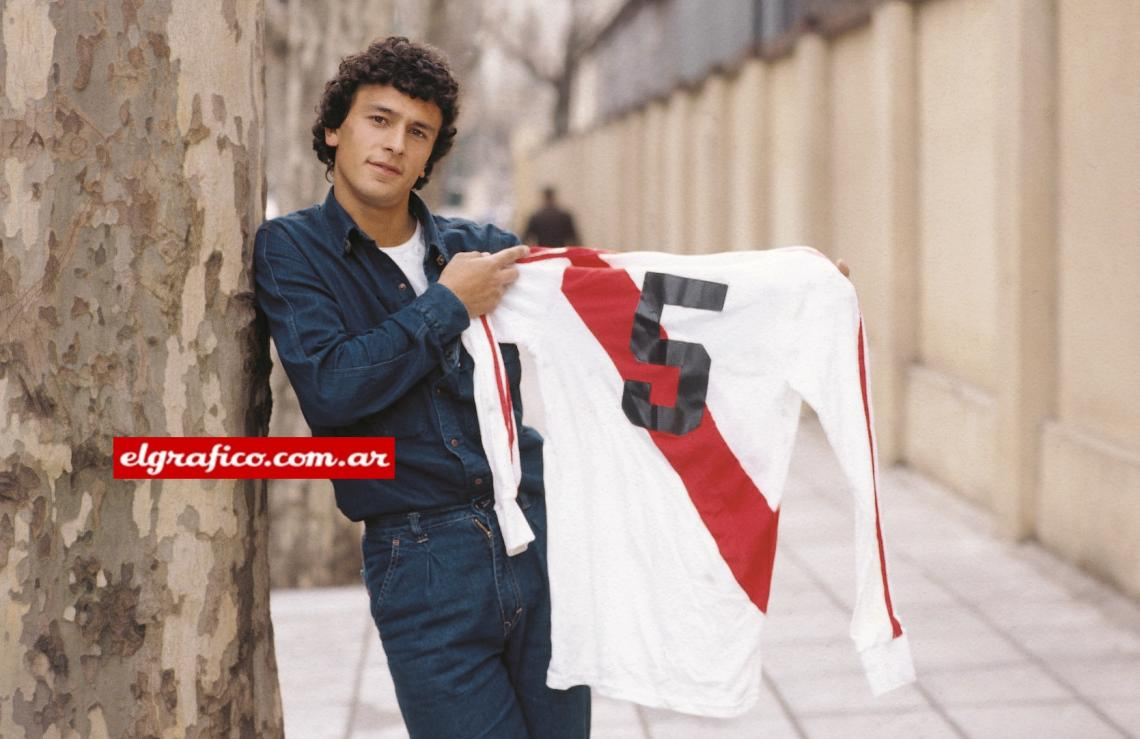
A young Gorosito with the River Plate jersey at the beginning of his career

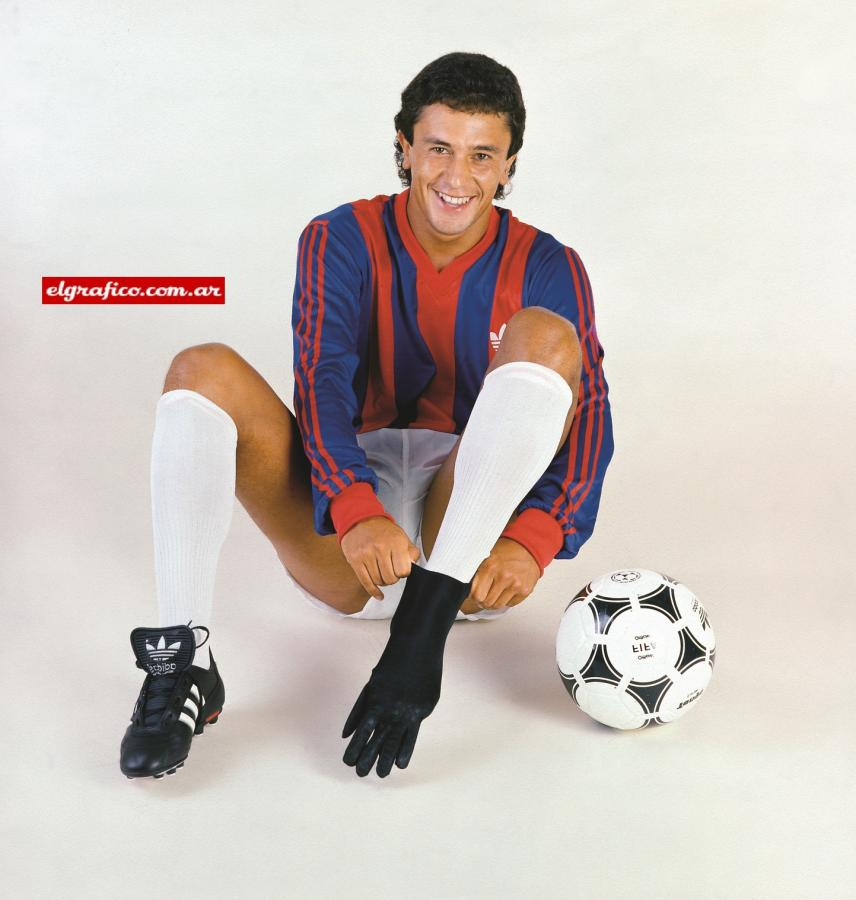
Gorosito in San Lorenzo, c. 1988

Club	Season	Competition	League		Cup		Continental		Other		Total	
Club	Season	Competition	Apps	Goals	Apps	Goals	Apps	Goals	Apps	Goals	Apps	Goals
River Plate	1983	Primera División	7	0	—		—		—		7	0
River Plate	1984	Primera División	9	0	—		—		—		9	0
River Plate	1985	Primera División	10	0	—		—		—		10	0
River Plate	1985–86	Primera División	31	2	—		—		—		31	2
River Plate	1986–87	Primera División	32	5	—		—		—		32	5
River Plate	1987–88	Primera División	16	0	—		—		—		16	0
River Plate	1988–89	Primera División	4	1	—		—		—		4	1
River Plate	Total		109	8	—		—		—		109	8
San Lorenzo	1988–89	Primera División	37	21	—		—		—		37	21
San Lorenzo	1989–90	Primera División	6	4	—		—		—		6	4
San Lorenzo	Total		43	25	—		—		—		43	25
Swarovski Tirol	1989–90	Austrian Bundesliga	26	11	—		3	0	1	0	30	11
Swarovski Tirol	1990–91	Austrian Bundesliga	30	5	—		4	1	—		34	6
Swarovski Tirol	1991–92	Austrian Bundesliga	21	6	—		4	1	—		25	7
Swarovski Tirol	Total		77	22	0	0	11	2	1	0	89	24
San Lorenzo	1991–92	Primera División	14	1	—		—		—		14	1
San Lorenzo	1992–93	Primera División	34	6	—		—		—		34	6
San Lorenzo	1993–94	Primera División	19	4	—		—		—		19	4
San Lorenzo	Total		67	11	—		—		—		67	11
Universidad Católica	1994	Primera División	30	7	—		—		—		30	7
Universidad Católica	1995	Primera División	28	5	—		—		—		28	5
Universidad Católica	Total		58	12	—		—		—		58	12
Yokohama Marinos	1996	J1 League	6	3	—		—		—		6	3
San Lorenzo	1996–97	Primera División	31	7	—		—		—		31	7
San Lorenzo	1997–98	Primera División	36	8	—		—		—		36	8
San Lorenzo	1998–99	Primera División	32	14	—		—		—		32	14
San Lorenzo	Total		99	29	—		—		—		99	29
Universidad Católica	1999	Primera División	29	1	—		—		—		29	1
Universidad Católica	2000	Primera División	10	0	—		—		—		10	0
Universidad Católica	Total		39	1	—		—		—		39	1
Career totals			498	111	0	0	11	2	1	0	510	113

=== National team ===
Argentina national team
Year	Apps	Goals
1989	5	0
1990	2	0
1992	2	0
1993	8	0
1997	2	1
Total	19	1

== Managerial statistics ==
As of 31 August 2026

Managerial record by team and tenure
Team	Nat	From	To	Record							
Team	Nat	From	To	G	W	D	L	GF	GA	GD	Win %
Nueva Chicago	(Argentina)	1 July 2002	30 June 2003	30	11	7	12	45	50	−5	36.67
San Lorenzo	(Argentina)	16 July 2003	25 August 2004	42	19	12	11	50	33	+17	45.24
Lanús	(Argentina)	1 January 2005	10 November 2005	32	10	12	10	48	48	+0	31.25
Rosario Central	(Argentina)	27 July 2006	10 March 2007	24	9	6	9	33	29	+4	37.50
Argentinos Juniors	(Argentina)	2 September 2007	31 December 2008	59	24	17	18	77	66	+11	40.68
River Plate	(Argentina)	1 January 2009	4 October 2009	34	10	9	15	40	49	−9	29.41
Xerez	(Spain)	19 January 2010	30 June 2010	20	7	5	8	31	34	−3	35.00
Argentinos Juniors	(Argentina)	20 September 2011	28 February 2012	16	6	5	5	16	13	+3	37.50
Tigre	(Argentina)	23 October 2012	30 June 2013	45	15	10	20	54	61	−7	33.33
Argentinos Juniors	(Argentina)	26 October 2014	22 December 2015	41	14	10	17	44	48	−4	34.15
Almería	(Spain)	23 December 2015	17 May 2016	20	6	8	6	20	21	−1	30.00
San Martín San Juan	(Argentina)	1 January 2017	18 March 2018	37	11	11	15	35	45	−10	29.73
Tigre	(Argentina)	13 February 2019	25 October 2020	44	19	8	17	58	57	+1	43.18
Olimpia	(Paraguay)	16 November 2020	15 March 2021	17	7	4	6	29	24	+5	41.18
Gimnasia La Plata	(Argentina)	31 August 2021	31 December 2022	60	27	16	17	74	59	+15	45.00
Colón	(Argentina)	22 February 2023	26 October 2023	36	10	15	11	37	41	−4	27.78
Tigre	(Argentina)	1 January 2024	19 March 2024	11	1	2	8	5	17	−12	9.09
Alianza Lima	(Peru)	5 December 2024	7 December 2025	55	27	16	12	81	55	+26	49.09
San Lorenzo	(Argentina)	3 July 2026	1 September 2026	8	2	2	4	3	6	−3	25.00
Total				631	235	175	221	782	757	+25	37.24

== Honours ==
=== Player ===
River Plate

- Primera División Argentina: 1985–86
- Copa Libertadores: 1986
- Intercontinental Cup: 1986
- Copa Interamericana: 1986

Swarovski Tirol

- Austrian Bundesliga: 1989–90

Universidad Católica

- Copa Interamericana: 1993
- Copa Chile: 1995

Argentina

- Copa América: 1993
- Artemio Franchi Cup: 1993

=== Manager ===
Tigre

- Copa de la Superliga: 2019

Olimpia

- Paraguayan Primera División: 2020

=== Individual ===
- Argentine Primera División Top scorer: 1988–89
