= Antonio Alzamendi =

Uruguayan footballer (born 1956)

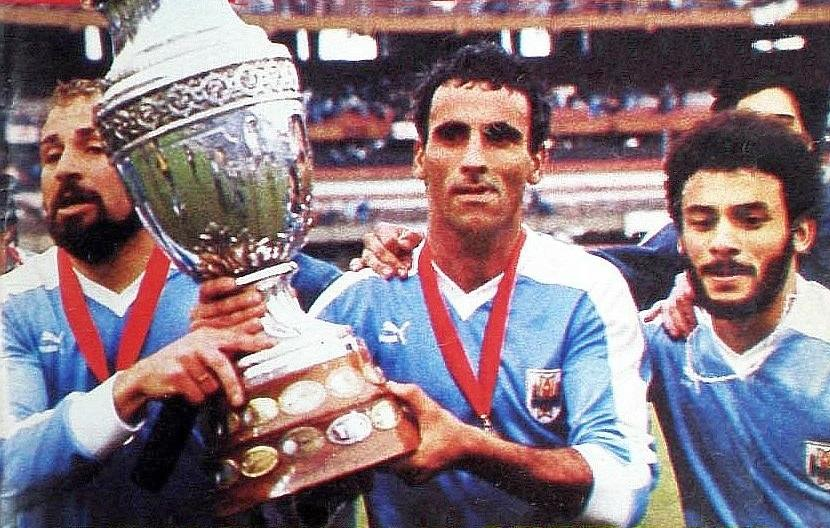
- Alzamendi (centre) with José Enrique Peña and Alfonso Domínguez after winning 1987 Copa América.

Personal information
- Full name: Antonio Alzamendi Casas
- Date of birth: 7 June 1956 (age 70)
- Place of birth: Durazno, Uruguay
- Height: 1.75 m (5 ft 9 in)
- Position: Second striker

Senior career*
| Years | Team | Apps | (Gls) |
| 1971–1973 | Wanderers de Durazno | | |
| 1974–1976 | Policial de Durazno | | |
| 1977–1978 | Sud América | 31 | (14) |
| 1978–1982 | Independiente | 185 | (75) |
| 1982–1983 | River Plate | | |
| 1983 | Nacional | 17 | (5) |
| 1983–1984 | Tecos UAG | 17 | (2) |
| 1985 | Peñarol | 28 | (13) |
| 1986–1988 | River Plate | 77 | (31) |
| 1988–1990 | Logroñés | 62 | (15) |
| 1990/'91 | Deportivo Mandiyú | 9 | (0) |
| 1993 | Rampla Juniors | 4 | (1) |

International career
| 1978–1990 | Uruguay | 32 | (6) |
Medal record
Representing Uruguay
Copa América
| Winner | 1987 Argentina |
| Runner-up | 1989 Brazil |
- * Club domestic league appearances and goals

Antonio Alzamendi Casas (born 7 June 1956) is a Uruguayan former footballer who played as a forward.

== Career ==
His official debut was with the Uruguayan team Wanderers de Durazno. Alzamendi played for Uruguay at the 1986 and 1990 FIFA World Cups, scoring against West Germany in 1986. He played several years for River Plate of Argentina, winning both the Copa Libertadores de América and Intercontinental Cup in 1986. In the Intercontinental Cup final, Alzamendi was named as man of the match and scored the only goal of the game in the 28th minute when he headed into the net after his initial shot had hit the post and then came back off the goalkeeper. That year he was also named South American Footballer of the Year.

In July 2001 he was appointed as coach of the Australian National Soccer League team Canberra Cosmos. However his contract was then terminated shortly after due to financial problems with the club.

In 2008, he became the coach of Sport Ancash from Peru.

== Honours ==
Independiente

- Argentine Primera División: 1978 Nacional

Nacional

- Uruguayan Primera División: 1983

River Plate

- Argentine Primera División: 1985-86
- Copa Libertadores: 1986
- Intercontinental Cup: 1986
- Copa Interamericana: 1986

Uruguay

- Copa América: 1987

=== Individuals ===
- South American Team of the Year: 1986, 1987
- South American Footballer of the Year: 1986
- Intercontinental Cup Man of the match: 1986
- Uruguayan Primera División Top Scorer: 1985 (13 goals)
- Supercopa Libertadores Top Scorer: 1988 (4 goals)

| Preceded by Michel Platini | World Club Championship Best Player; 1986 | Succeeded by Rabah Madjer |
