= Sergio Goycochea =

Argentine footballer (born 1963)

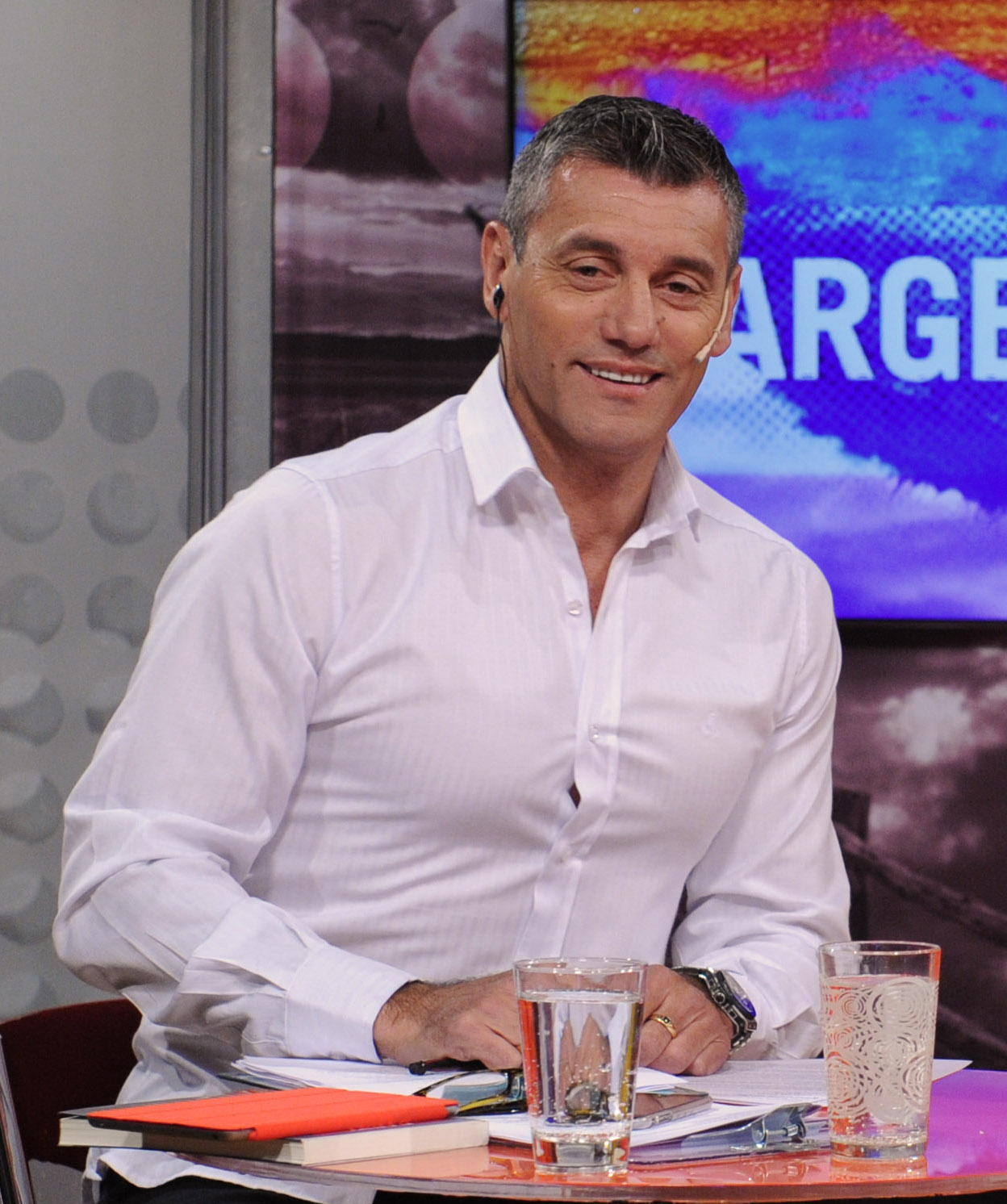
- Goycochea in 2015

Personal information
- Full name: Sergio Javier Goycochea
- Date of birth: 17 October 1963 (age 63)
- Place of birth: Zárate, Buenos Aires, Argentina
- Height: 1.85 m (6 ft 1 in)
- Position: Goalkeeper

Senior career*
Years	Team	Apps	(Gls)
1979–1982	Defensores Unidos		
1982–1988	River Plate	58	(0)
1988–1990	Millonarios	39	(0)
1990–1991	Racing Club	35	(0)
1991	Brest	11	(0)
1992	Cerro Porteño		
1992–1993	Olimpia		
1993–1994	River Plate	16	(0)
1994–1995	Mandiyú	30	(0)
1995–1996	Internacional	22	(0)
1996–1997	Vélez Sársfield	2	(0)
1997–1998	Newell's Old Boys	13	(0)
Total		226	(0)

International career
1981	Argentina U20	3	(0)
1987–1994	Argentina	44	(0)
Medal record
Men's football
Representing Argentina
Copa América
Winner	1991 Chile
Winner	1993 Ecuador
FIFA Confederations Cup
Winner	1992 Saudi Arabia
CONMEBOL–UEFA Cup of Champions
Winner	1993 Argentina
FIFA World Cup
Runner-up	1990 Italy
- * Club domestic league appearances and goals

Sergio Javier Goycochea (Spanish pronunciation: [ˈseɾxjo xaˈβjeɾ ɣojkoˈtʃea]; born 17 October 1963) is an Argentine former professional footballer who played as a goalkeeper. He is best known for helping his country reach the 1990 FIFA World Cup Final with his penalty kick saves.

== Club career ==
Goycochea played a few months in the French second division in 1991 for Stade Brestois 29, then named Brest Armorique, a team which included players such as David Ginola, Corentin Martins and Stéphane Guivarc'h. Nonetheless, the team went bankrupt in November of that year, and was moved to the third division and lost its professional-team status.

== International career ==
Goycochea was the substitute for Nery Pumpido both in River Plate and in the Argentina national team, and got his big break at the 1990 FIFA World Cup. When Pumpido broke his leg in Argentina's second group game against the Soviet Union, Goycochea stepped in and remained the team's starting goalkeeper for the remainder of the tournament.

In the knockout stage, Goycochea effectively played a huge part in keeping Argentina in the tournament; he kept a clean sheet in the 1–0 Second Round victory over Brazil and saved penalties in the quarter-final and semi-final penalty shootout victories against Yugoslavia and host Italy.

In the final, Argentina lost 1–0 to West Germany; Goycochea was also close to saving the 85th minute penalty kick from Andreas Brehme (controversially awarded after Roberto Sensini bought down Rudi Völler), while earlier at the 58th minute mark Goycochea was fortunate not to concede a penalty kick for blatantly tripping Klaus Augenthaler in the box. Goycochea was chosen as the goalkeeper of the Cup's All-Star Team. Reflecting on the 1990 tournament, he told FIFA: "To my mind, it was as if we were world champions again anyway".

With the national team, Goycochea went on to win the 1991 Copa América, 1992 FIFA Confederations Cup, 1993 Artemio Franchi Cup, and 1993 Copa América. At the latter tournament, he appeared on TV commercials for a Pepsi promotion by PepsiCo's division in Guayaquil. Goycochea also was on TV commercials for Adidas years later.

His last name, Goycochea, spelled without e, but which other people of the same genealogy spell as Goycoechea, is derived from the Basque surname Goikoetxea meaning topmost house (from goiko "of the top" and etxe "house"). Sergio is frequently nicknamed thus El Vasco, but also El Goyco.

Goycochea is a football journalist hosting Elegante Sport (Argentina's Canal 7) and has partnered with Diego Maradona at La Noche del 10.

== Career statistics ==
=== International ===
Argentina national team
Year	Apps	Goals
1987	1	0
1988	0	0
1989	0	0
1990	7	0
1991	13	0
1992	4	0
1993	16	0
1994	3	0
Total	44	0

== Honours ==
=== Club ===
River Plate

- Argentine Primera División: 1985–86, 1993 Apertura
- Copa Libertadores: 1986
- Copa Interamericana: 1986
- Intercontinental Cup: 1986
- Copa Centenario de la AFA runner-up: 1993

Millonarios

- Campeonato Colombiano: 1988

Olimpia

- Copa CONMEBOL runner-up: 1992

Vélez Sarsfield

- Recopa Sudamericana: 1997

=== International ===
Argentina Youth

- South American Games: 1982, 1986

Argentina

- Copa América: 1991, 1993
- FIFA Confederations Cup: 1992
- CONMEBOL–UEFA Cup of Champions: 1993
- FIFA World Cup runner-up: 1990

=== Individual ===
- FIFA World Cup All-Star Team: 1990
- Footballer of the Year of Argentina: 1990
- World XI: 1991
- IFFHS World's Best Goalkeeper (2): Silver ball 1991, 1993
- South American Team of the Year (2): 1992, 1993
- Copa América player of the tournament: 1993

== See also ==
- List of expatriate footballers in Paraguay
- Players and Records in Paraguayan Football
