= Ramón Centurión =

Argentine footballer

Personal information
- Full name: Ramón Miguel Centurión
- Date of birth: January 20, 1962 (age 64)
- Place of birth: Santa Fe, Argentina
- Position: Striker

Senior career*
Years	Team	Apps	(Gls)
1978–1985	Unión de Santa Fe	156	(47)
1985	Boca Juniors	19	(6)
1986–1990	River Plate	50	(14)
1990–1991	Estudiantes	15	(3)
1991–1992	Unión de Santa Fe	21	(3)
- * Club domestic league appearances and goals

Ramón Miguel Centurión (born 20 January 1962 in Santa Fe) is a former Argentine football striker who won Copa Libertadores 1986 with River Plate.

== Playing career ==
Centurión began his playing career in 1978 with home town club Unión de Santa Fe where he made 156 appearances and scored 47 goals. In 1985, he joined Boca Juniors but only participated in the first half of the 1985-86 season before joining Boca's fiercest rivals, River Plate.

In his first year with River they won the Primera División Argentina 1985-86 championship and the Copa Libertadores 1986. Centurión was the top scorer for the club with 7 goal.

In 1986 Centurión was embroiled in a doping scandal and served a suspension after testing positive for Methamphetamines, he still maintains that he never intentionally took performance-enhancing drugs. One of the most popular rumours involves Juan Gilberto Funes, Centurion's teammate at the time. Funes is accused of introducing drugs in a bottle of water which was handled to Centurion after a match.

After serving his suspension he returned to play in River's championship winning team of 1989-90. He then had a short stint with Estudiantes de La Plata before returning to Unión de Santa Fe where he retired from football in 1992.

== After retirement ==
Centurión suffered from depression for many years before returning to work at Unión as a youth team coach in 2003.

== Titles ==
Season	Team	Title
1985-86	River Plate	Primera División Argentina
1986	River Plate	Copa Libertadores
1989-90	River Plate	Primera División Argentina
