= Héctor Enrique =

Argentine footballer (born 1962)

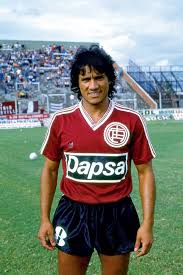
- Enrique while playing for Lanús in 1982

Personal information
- Full name: Héctor Adolfo Enrique
- Date of birth: 26 April 1962 (age 64)
- Place of birth: Lanús, Argentina
- Height: 1.72 m (5 ft 8 in)
- Position: Midfielder

Senior career*
| Years | Team | Apps | (Gls) |
| 1982 | Lanús | | |
| 1983–1990 | River Plate | 134 | (7) |
| 1990–1991 | Deportivo Español | 22 | (3) |
| 1991–1993 | Lanús | 60 | (12) |
| 1995 | Tosu Futures | | |
| 1996–1997 | FPI Hamamatsu | | |

International career
| 1986–1989 | Argentina | 11 | (0) |
Medal record
Representing Argentina
FIFA World Cup
| Winner | 1986 Mexico | Team |
- * Club domestic league appearances and goals

Héctor Adolfo Enrique (born 26 April 1962), better known as El Negro Enrique, is an Argentine football coach and former player who is assistant coach at Al-Wasl club of UAE Arabian Gulf League. A midfielder, he played for Argentina national team in the 1986 World Cup and in Copa América 1989, winning the former competition. He later was assistant coach of La Seleccion.

== Career ==
Nicknamed El Negro by both press and fans, Enrique began his playing career in 1982 with 2nd division side Club Atlético Lanús, in 1983 he joined Club Atlético River Plate where he played between 1983 and 1990. His Golden Year was 1986, when he won the 1985–86 Primera División Argentina, Copa Libertadores and Intercontinental Cup. For Argentina he was a vital part of the squad that won the 1986 World Cup.

Enrique was the last man to touch the ball when inside the Argentine half he passed it to Diego Maradona, who would then score what became known as the Goal of the Century. After the game, he jokingly suggested that his pass was so good, it would have been difficult for Maradona not to score. This joke would then become popular in Argentina, often mentioned by players involved in popular goals.

A serious knee injury prevented him from playing in the 1990 World Cup.

== Personal life ==
Enrique played alongside his brother Carlos at River (1988–1990) and at their home town club Lanús (1992–1993). He also played for Deportivo Español in Argentina and Tosu Futures and FPI Hamamatsu in Japan. His sons, Ramiro and Fernando, also played football professionally; while other son, Facundo, played rugby.

Politically, Enrique has been a staunch supporter of former Argentine president Cristina Fernández de Kirchner.

== Honours ==
River Plate

- Primera División: 1985–86, 1989–90
- Intercontinental Cup: 1986
- Copa Libertadores: 1986
- Copa Interamericana: 1986

Lanús

- Primera B Nacional: 1991–92

Argentina

- FIFA World Cup: 1986

Individual

- South American Team of the Year: 1986
