= Américo Gallego =

Argentine footballer and coach (born 1955)

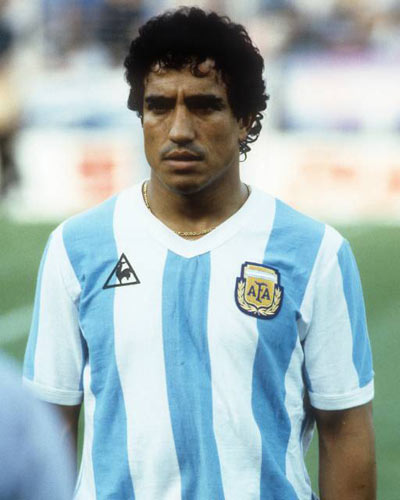
- Gallego with Argentina in 1982

Personal information
- Full name: Américo Rubén Gallego
- Date of birth: 25 April 1955 (age 71)
- Place of birth: Morteros, Argentina
- Height: 1.70 m (5 ft 7 in)
- Position: Central midfielder

Senior career*
Years	Team	Apps	(Gls)
1974–1980	Newell's Old Boys	262	(25)
1981–1988	River Plate	180	(10)
Total		442	(35)

International career
1975–1982	Argentina	73	(3)

Managerial career
- 1994: River Plate
- 2000–2001: River Plate
- 2002–2003: Independiente
- 2004: Newell's Old Boys
- 2005–2007: Toluca
- 2007–2008: Tigres
- 2009–2010: Independiente
- 2011: Colo-Colo
- 2012–2013: Independiente
- 2015: Newell's Old Boys
- 2019–2020: Panama
Medal record
Men's football
Representing Argentina
FIFA World Cup
Winner	1978
- * Club domestic league appearances and goals

Américo Rubén "Tolo" Gallego (born 25 April 1955) is an Argentine professional former football player and former manager. As a midfielder, he played 73 times for the Argentina national team during his playing career, where he won the 1978 FIFA World Cup. Then in 1986, he won the Copa Libertadores and the Intercontinental Cup.

== Club career ==
Gallego said he was taken to Rosario, Santa Fe, Argentina at the age of 5 and played for Club Alianza Sport as a child. He made his debut with Newell's Old Boys at the age of 14.

As the age of 19, Gallego debuted in the Argentine league in 1974 as a midfielder for Newell's Old Boys. After a rookie season in which he saw little action, he quickly made a name for himself and was given a starting spot and regular playing time during the 1975 season. Gallego played for Argentina at the 1975 Pan American Games. After being part of the Argentina national team that won the 1978 FIFA World Cup, Gallego stayed on at Newell's for three more years before being transferred to one of the two biggest teams in his country: River Plate.

Gallego played at River until the end of his career. He played for the "Millonarios" for seven years before retiring at the conclusion of the 1987/88 season. He is hailed as a legend at River, as he was the captain during the team's achieving their first Copa Libertadores, Intercontinental Cup and Copa Interamericana's in their rich history.

"El Tolo" Gallego's career ended with a total of 440 Argentine league appearances and 35 goals in a span of 14 years.

== Coaching career ==
After retirement, Gallego turned his attention towards coaching. In 1994 Gallego was chosen to manage his former team, River Plate. In his first tournament as head coach, his Millonarios went undefeated to win the championship.

From 1995, he served as an assistant coach under Daniel Passarella, the Argentine national team's head coach, for the three-year tenure. After his experience with the national team, El Tolo returned to coach River Plate, with whom he won another championship, this time in 2000.

In 2002, he coached Independiente to a championship, ending the team's 8-year drought. In 2004, he returned to the Newell's Old Boys organization after a 23-year hiatus, and once again proved his worth as a head coach, winning a championship that very same year. With that, he became only the second coach ever to win the Argentine Primera championship with three different Argentine clubs (along with José Yudica, who did the same with Argentinos Juniors, Quilmes and Newell's).

His success attracted attention from teams in other countries, notably from Mexico. After leaving Newell's Old Boys, Gallego was sought after by a myriad of clubs, including San Lorenzo de Almagro, but chose CD Toluca in Mexico. Despite being overtly criticized by the media and his team's own fans for his defensive style and benching of established players in favor of younger, inexperienced players – his scheme paid off and Toluca won the Apertura 2005 championship in Mexico, and was named Best Coach of the championship. In 2007 Gallego resigned as coach for Toluca and said he wanted some time off to be with his family and be away from soccer for a while. His time off did not last long, as a juicy offer from Tigres UANL made him change his mind and take over for Mario Carrillo as coach. After an unsuccessful spell and a streak of bad results he was sacked in February 2008.

In March 2009 he returned to Independiente to take over from Miguel Ángel Santoro, and signed until June 2010, but did not end up winning any championships nor renewing his contract.

In February 2011 he began a new tenure in Colo-Colo of Chile, which finished on August of that same year.

== Career statistics ==
=== Player ===
Club performance			League		Cup		League Cup		Continental		Total	
Season	Club	League	Apps	Goals	Apps	Goals	Apps	Goals	Apps	Goals	Apps	Goals
1974	Newell's Old Boys	Primera División	4	0								
1975	Newell's Old Boys	Primera División	27	2								
1976	Newell's Old Boys	Primera División	45	5								
1977	Newell's Old Boys	Primera División	56	6								
1978	Newell's Old Boys	Primera División	27	7								
1979	Newell's Old Boys	Primera División	29	1								
1980	Newell's Old Boys	Primera División	46	4								
1981	Newell's Old Boys	Primera División	28	0								
1981	River Plate	Primera División	15	1								
1982	River Plate	Primera División	18	0								
1983	River Plate	Primera División	34	3								
1984	River Plate	Primera División	30	4								
1985	River Plate	Primera División	44	1								
1985–86	River Plate	Primera División	0	0								
1986–87	River Plate	Primera División	16	0								
1987–88	River Plate	Primera División	23	1								
Career total												

=== International career ===
Argentina national team
Year	Apps	Goals
1975	7	1
1976	13	0
1977	9	0
1978	13	1
1979	9	0
1980	10	0
1981	4	1
1982	8	0
Total	73	3

=== Manager ===
Team	Nation	From	To	Record				
Team	Nation	From	To	G	W	D	L	Win %
River Plate	(Argentina)	1994	1994					
River Plate	(Argentina)	2000	2001					
Independiente	(Argentina)	2002	2003					
Newell's Old Boys	(Argentina)	2003	2004					
Toluca	(Mexico)	2005	2007					
Tigres	(Mexico)	2007	2008					
Independiente	(Argentina)	2009	2010					
Colo-Colo	(Chile)	2011	2011					
Total								

== Honours ==
=== Player ===
River Plate

- Argentine Primera División: Nacional 1981, 1985–86
- Copa Libertadores: 1986
- Copa Interamericana: 1986
- Intercontinental Cup: 1986

Argentina Youth

- Toulon Tournament: 1975

Argentina

- FIFA World Cup: 1978

=== Manager ===
River Plate

- Argentine Primera División: Apertura 1994, Clausura 2000

Independiente

- Argentine Primera División: Apertura 2002

Newell's Old Boys

- Argentine Primera División: Apertura 2004

Toluca

- Mexican Primera División: Apertura 2005
- Campeón de Campeones: 2006
