= Jonathan Arias =

Mexican footballer (born 1986)

Personal information
- Full name: Jonathan Arias Tenorio
- Date of birth: 18 April 1986 (age 40)
- Place of birth: Toluca, Mexico
- Height: 1.77 m (5 ft 9 1/2 in)
- Position: Defender

Youth career
- Toluca

Senior career*
Years	Team	Apps	(Gls)
2006–2009	Atlético Mexiquense	30	(0)
2006–2008	Toluca	21	(0)
2009–2011	Potros UAEM		
2011	Altamira	0	(0)
- * Club domestic league appearances and goals

Jonathan Arias Tenorio (born 18 April 1986) is a Mexican former footballer who played as central defender.

Arias started his career in the Toluca youth team until catching the eye of the then Toluca coach Americo Gallego. Gallego was so impressed by Arias' leaping ability and fast reaction time that he described Arias as someone who in the future could be called the "Mexican Cannavaro", making reference to Italy's World Cup winning captain Fabio Cannavaro.

Arias made his debut with the Toluca senior squad on 20 August 2006 in a 3–0 home victory over Gallos Blancos de Querétaro FC. He played the full 90 minutes of the match. He impressed Gallego in that game with his good decision making and composure. He was included in the team in nine out of the next 15 league games. After Gallego left Toluca, Arias has had few appearances with the major team.
