= 1986 Intercontinental Cup =

- Cover of the match's programme, depicting Steaua București's László Bölöni and River Plate's Norberto "Beto" Alonso
Steaua București	River Plate
(Romania)	(Argentina)
0	1
- Date: 14 December 1986
- Venue: National Stadium, Tokyo
- Man of the Match: Antonio Alzamendi (River Plate)
- Referee: José Luis Martínez Bazán (Uruguay)
- Attendance: 62,000

The 1986 Intercontinental Cup was the 25th edition of the Intercontinental Cup, an annual association football match between the winners of the European Cup (now referred to as the Champions League) and the Copa Libertadores. The match was played on 14 December 1986 at the National Stadium in Tokyo, Japan, between Steaua București of Romania and River Plate of Argentina, both having qualified for the first time as champions of their respective continental tournaments.

River Plate won 1–0 in front of a crowd of 62,000, with Antonio Alzamendi scoring the only goal in the 28th minute following a quick free kick. A Steaua București goal was ruled out for offside in the 16th minute, a decision later criticized by players from the Romanian side. The victory marked River Plate's first Intercontinental Cup. Alzamendi was named most valuable player of the match, and Norberto Alonso announced his retirement after the tournament, making the final his last match as a footballer.

== Background ==
The 1986 Intercontinental Cup was the 25th edition of the Intercontinental Cup, a association football match contested annually between the champions of the European Cup (now known as the Champions League) and the Copa Libertadores. The first edition was played in 1960, with Spanish club Real Madrid after defeating Uruguayan club Peñarol 5–1 on aggregate. By the late 1970s, the competition was in decline, with several European champions withdrawing and leaving their places to European Cup runners-up, as a number of matches had ended in serious fights. In 1980, British company West Nally had discussions with Japanese advertising company Dentsu and Japanese car company Toyota to support the InterSoccer4 program. Toyota proposed to make an event for them; after learning about the Intercontinental Cup, they agreed to rename it as the Toyota Cup. The first match under Toyota's name would be the 1980 edition, won by Club Nacional de Football.

Romanian club Steaua București qualified for the tournament as the 1985–86 European Cup winners (now known as the Champions League), after beating Spanish club Barcelona 2–0 in a penalty shoot-out when the match resulted in a goalless draw, becoming the first Eastern European club to do so. It was the first edition of the European Cup after the Heysel Stadium disaster where 39 people died, and the subsequent indefinite ban on English clubs from European competition. Steaua București were the reigning league champions, winning the 1985–86 Divizia A with 57 points. Their last match before the tournament was played at home against Petrolul Ploiești in the 1986–87 season on 5 December, winning 3–0.

River Plate qualified for the tournament for the first time as the 1986 Copa Libertadores winners after beating Colombian club América de Cali in the finals 1–3 on aggregate. It was the club's first Libertadores; they had previously lost the 1966 Copa Libertadores finals to Peñarol and the 1976 Copa Libertadores finals to Brazilian club Cruzeiro. Like Steaua București, Argentine club River Plate were also the reigning league champions, securing the 1985–86 Argentine Primera División after beating Vélez Sarsfield 3–0 on the 33rd match day and finishing with 56 points. Their last match before the tournament was in the 1986–87 season, away against Rosario Central—who would be that season's champion—on 7 December, winning 2–3.

== Match ==
=== Pre-match ===
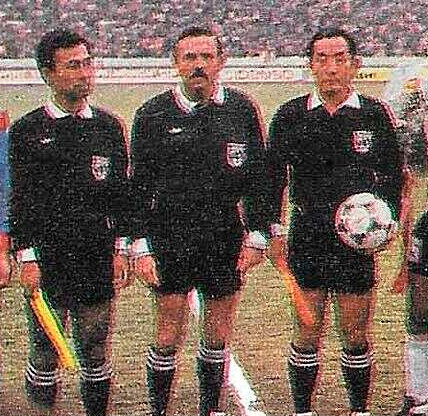
The referees chosen for the match were main referee José Luis Martínez Bazán (middle) and assistant referees Lee Do Ha (right) and Shizuo Takada (left).

The stadium that was chosen for the match was the now-demolished National Stadium in Tokyo, Japan, which was chosen in all editions of the cup from 1980 to 2001. The referee for the match was José Luis Martínez Bazán from Uruguay, and the assistant referees were Lee Do Ha from South Korea and Shizuo Takada from Japan.

Manager of the newly crowned European champions, Emerich Jenei, was appointed as the head coach of the Romanian national team and left the club as a consequent. Assistant Anghel Iordănescu assumed his position following his departure. Before the match, it was of public knowledge the several injuries suffered in the Romanian side. Midfielder László Bölöni and goalkeeper Helmut Duckadam, who had both started in the European Cup final, had physical impairments and were believed to not play. Nonetheless, the Romanians sent Bölöni with the squad to Japan in hopes of a swift recovery, which ultimately didn't occur. Steaua București made only one change from their European Cup final lineup, apart from Bölöni and Duckadam: Mihail Majearu, who was named as a substitute. On the other hand, the 33 year-old River Plate captain, Norberto "Beto" Alonso, was not in good physical condition, and his place in the starting eleven was doubted. River Plate were considered favourites to win the tournament.

=== Summary ===
==== First half ====
The match was played on 14 December 1986, kicking off at 11 a.m. local time (2 am UTC). 62,000 people attended the match and was televised in around 60 countries. In Romania it was not broadcast live, as it was played at 4 a.m. Eastern European Time and television broadcasts were then only allowed until 10 pm; it was shown a day later. In the first ten minutes, River Plate was granted three free kicks near the penalty area; one of them was in the fifth minute, where Alonso made a fast free kick pass to Roque Alfaro, who took a shot that was saved by the keeper. In the 16th minute, Miodrag Belodedici scored after a River Plate player passed him the ball, but referee Takado ruled the goal out for offside. (Note: Under the Laws of the Game, a ball played to an attacker by an opponent does not constitute an offside offence.)

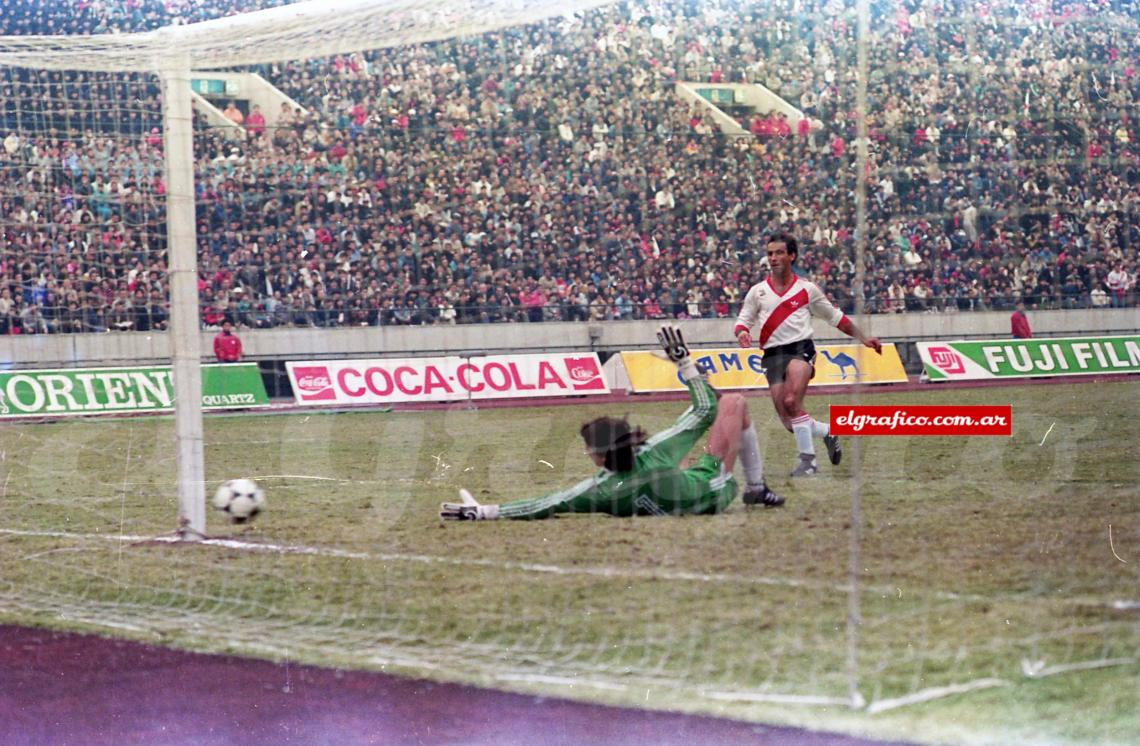
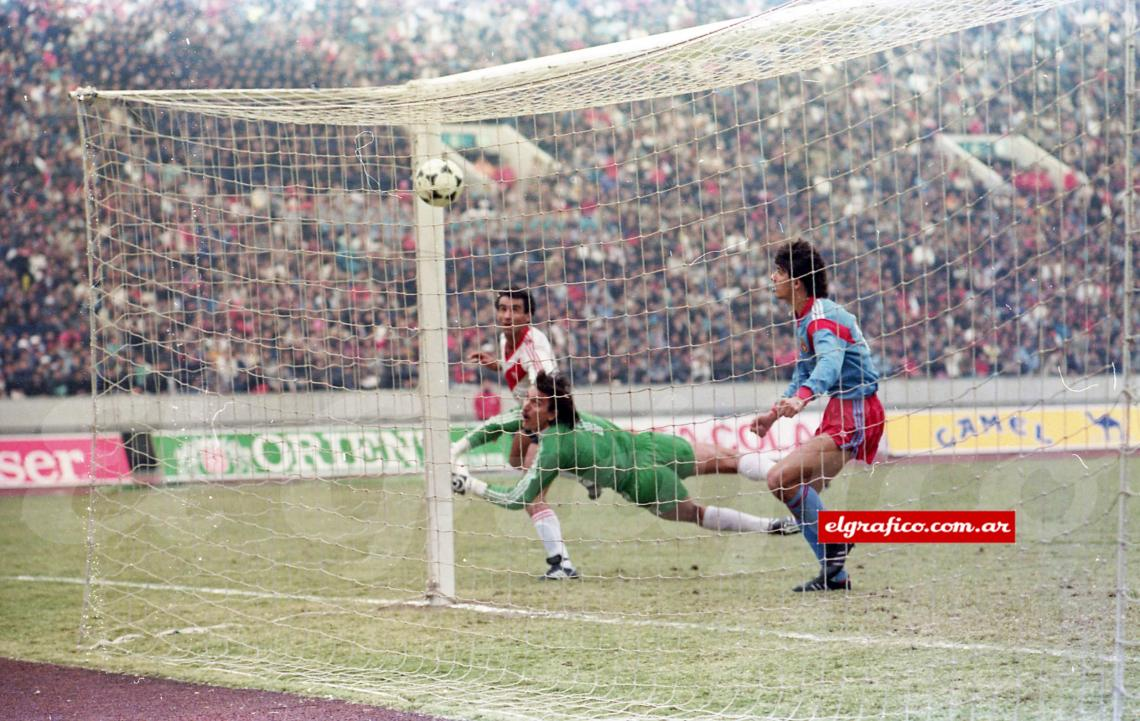
Sequence of the only goal of the match, scored by Antonio Alzamendi

The only goal of the match came in the 28th minute, when Alonso took a quick free kick after Juan Gilberto Funes was fouled 22 metres from goal by Adrian Bumbescu, who remained arguing with Bazán. The move caught the Steaua București defence off guard. Antonio Alzamendi received Alonso's pass and shot, hitting the left post, before heading the rebound into the net. In a match report for El Gráfico, sports journalist Natalio Gorin criticised Alonso's performance, citing his physical condition, but praised his “mental velocity” and credited it for River Plate's winning goal.

==== Second half ====
River Plate ran down the clock at various points in the second half. According to authors Diego Estévez and Sergio Lodise, Steaua București were desperate to draw the match. Spanish newspaper Mundo Deportivo agreed, but noted that River Plate were also playing nervously. Steaua București still controlled most of the match, though many of their chances were wasted on long-range shots or stopped by River Plate's defence.

Missed shot by Roque Alfaro

Around the middle of the second half, Alfaro passed the ball to Alzamedi, who broke through to the rival's penalty area and crossed it back to Alfaro, who delivered a right-leg shot but was denied by the goalkeeper. Steaua București captain Tudorel Stoica was through on goal against Nery Pumpido in the 52nd minute, but could not score. In the 60th minute, Steaua București made its only substitution, replacing Ilie Bărbulescu for Majearu. Eight minutes later, River Plate would do the same, replacing Alfaro for Daniel Sperandío. In the final minutes of the game, River Plate manager Héctor Veira tried to force the game to end by making a small pitch invasion along with his players.

Gorin described Steaua București's style of play as creative and bold, giving Marius Lăcătuș and Gabi Balint as examples of these characteristics. However, he also criticised their defence and organisation, writing that they were exposing themselves by not closing down spaces and that they did not agree amongst themselves. Writer Miguel Angel Bertolotto noted an "offensive counterattacking" playing style from the Argentine team, which he thought Viera used extensively in his career as a head coach.

=== Details ===
14 December 1986
11:00 JST

Steaua București (Romania)	0–1	(Argentina) River Plate
	Report	Alzamendi 28'

National Stadium, Tokyo
Attendance: 62,000
Referee: José Luis Martínez Bazán (Uruguay)

Steaua București	River Plate

GK	1	(Romania) Dumitru Stângaciu
DF	2	(Romania) Ștefan Iovan
DF	6	(Romania) Miodrag Belodedici
DF	4	(Romania) Adrian Bumbescu	Yellow card
DF	11	(Romania) Anton Weissenbacher
MF	3	(Romania) Ilie Bărbulescu	(substituted off) 60'
MF	5	(Romania) Tudorel Stoica (c)
MF	8	(Romania) Lucian Bălan
MF	10	(Romania) Gabi Balint
FW	7	(Romania) Marius Lăcătuș
FW	9	(Romania) Victor Pițurcă
Substitutes:
GK	12	(Romania) Constantin Blid
DF	13	(Romania) Niță Cireașă
MF	14	(Romania) Mihail Majearu		(substituted on) 60'
MF	15	(Romania) Iosif Rotariu
Manager:
(Romania) Anghel Iordănescu

GK	1	(Argentina) Nery Pumpido
DF	4	(Argentina) Jorge Gordillo
DF	2	(Uruguay) Nelson Gutiérrez
DF	6	(Argentina) Oscar Ruggeri
DF	3	(Argentina) Alejandro Montenegro	Yellow card
MF	8	(Argentina) Héctor Enrique	Yellow card
MF	5	(Argentina) Américo Gallego (c)
MF	10	(Argentina) Norberto Alonso
MF	11	(Argentina) Roque Alfaro	(substituted off) 68'
FW	7	(Uruguay) Antonio Alzamendi
FW	9	(Argentina) Juan Gilberto Funes
Substitutes:
GK	12	(Argentina) Sergio Goycochea
DF	13	(Argentina) Rubén D. Gómez
MF	14	(Argentina) Daniel Sperandío	(substituted on) 68'
MF	15	(Argentina) Néstor Gorosito
MF	16	(Argentina) Claudio Morresi
Manager:
(Argentina) Héctor Veira

Man of the Match
Antonio Alzamendi (River Plate)

Assistant referees
Lee Do Ha (South Korea)
Shizuo Takada (Japan)

== Post-match ==
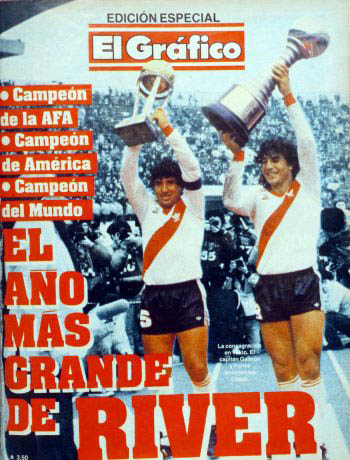
Cover of El Gráfico showing River Plate captain Américo Gallego (left) and Juan Gilberto Funes (right) lifting the trophies

At the final whistle, River Plate became the fifth Argentine club to win the Intercontinental Cup. The River Plate team made a victory lap to celebrate its triumph and lifted both the Intercontinental Cup trophy and the Toyota trophy. Around 60 photographers showed up to take pictures of the players, and the team proceeded a reverse victory lap. Alzamendi was named most valuable player of the match, which carried a Toyota Carina as a prize. He declined the car and asked instead for a cheque to be shared with the kit men and medics.

The event generated US$600,000 in revenue (equivalent to about USD 1.77 million as of December 2025). After the tournament, Alonso announced his retirement at the age of 34, making the Intercontinental Cup his last match as a footballer. River Plate players each received a bonus of US$38,177 (about US$112,900 as of December 2025) for winning the cup, while Steaua București players received US$4,090 each (about US$12,100).

In a 2015 interview, Veira reflected on the final, describing it as a very tactical game, as he had expected, that demanded a high level of concentration. He added that he only encountered difficulty when Steaua București began crossing the ball. In an interview after the match in 1986, Alonso said that Steaua București had unbalanced River Plate in midfield and switched play quickly through the wings, but were lacking in front of goal. In 1995, he cited the match as one of the best of his 15-year career.

Steaua București manager Anghel Iordănescu said in a post-match interview that his team had lost concentration for a brief moment before Alzamendi's goal, and that this cost them the match. He also said that the result would have been different had Bölöni played. In a 2011 interview, Belodedici criticised Takada's decision to rule Steaua București's goal offside. He suggested that, amid the commotion in the penalty area, Takada had not seen that the ball had been played to him by a River Plate player. In a 2021 interview with ProSport, Stoica said that Steaua would have won the cup had video assistant referees (VAR) existed at the time.

Steaua București finished the 1986–87 season as the league's champion with 59 points, 15 points above Dinamo București. They were eliminated in the second round of the 1986–87 European Cup by R.S.C. Anderlecht. The team would reach the final again in the 1988–89 European Cup, where they lost 4–0 to AC Milan.

== See also ==
- Steaua București in European football
- River Plate in international football

== Bibliography ==
- Hale, Steve; Ponting, Ivan (1992). Liverpool In Europe. London: Guinness Publishing. ISBN 0-85112-569-7.
- Zaharia, Mihai. Steaua Bucureşti – deceniul de aur (1986-1996). Amintiri de suporter (in Romanian). LOGOS SRL. ISBN 978-973-8131-51-4. Archived from the original on 19 December 2025.
- Williamson, Daniel (18 July 2022). When Two Worlds Collide. Pitch Publishing. ISBN 978-1-80150-145-3.
- Bertolotto, Miguel Angel (2000). River, el campeón del siglo (in Spanish). Buenos Aires: Océano Argentina Temas Grupo Editorial. ISBN 978-987-9164-50-1.
- Estévez, Diego Ariel; Lodise, Sergio Alberto (2006). 105: historia de un siglo rojo y blanco (in Spanish). Buenos Aires: Ed. Continente. ISBN 978-950-754-198-8.
