= Rónald Mora =

Costa Rican footballer (born 1961)

Personal information
- Full name: Rónald A. Mora Padilla
- Date of birth: 18 July 1961 (age 65)
- Place of birth: Acosta, Costa Rica
- Position: Defender

Senior career*
Years	Team	Apps	(Gls)
1980–1987	Saprissa		
1987–1989	Alajuelense		
1990–1992	Carmelita		

Managerial career
- 1993–1995: Carmelita
- 1996–1998: Limonense
- 1999–2003: Santos de Guápiles
- 2003: Liberia Mía
- 2003: Santa Bárbara
- 2004–2005: Herediano
- 2005: Puntarenas
- 2006–2007: Cartaginés
- 2007: Santos de Guápiles
- 2008: Municipal Grecia
- 2009: Herediano
- 2010–2011: Limón
- 2012: Puntarenas
- 2012–2013: Deportivo Ayutla
- 2013: Siquirreña
- 2013–2014: Costa Rica U-20
- * Club domestic league appearances and goals

Rónald Mora Padilla (born 18 July 1961) is a retired Costa Rican football player who played most of his career with Deportivo Saprissa, during the 1980s, as well as Alajuelense and Carmelita.

== Club career ==
He won one national championship with Saprissa and one CONCACAF Champions Cup with Alajuelense. Nicknamed El Macho, he is remembered for being a strong defender.

== Managerial career ==
He began a career in coaching upon retiring, starting with Carmelita in 1993 and has coached teams such as Limonense, Santos de Guápiles (twice), Liberia Mía, Santa Bárbara, Herediano (twice), Cartaginés, Municipal Grecia and Limón, of Costa Rica's first division. He reached the local finals with Santos de Guápiles and Herediano. He lost both to the teams that he played for when active, while with Santos with Alajuelense and when coaching Herediano with Saprissa. In October 2012, he was fired by Puntarenas. In September 2013 he left the Guatemalan side Deportivo Ayutla and took charge at second division Siquirreña.

In July 2014, Mora was dismissed as coach of the Costa Rica U-20 football team after taking the reins in November 2013.

As a coach, he discovered future stars, such as Andy Herron, Kurt Bernard, Adrián De Lemos, among others.
