= Álvaro Solano =

Costa Rican footballer (born 1961)

Personal information
- Full name: Álvaro Enrique Solano Artavia
- Date of birth: 25 June 1961 (age 65)
- Place of birth: Alajuela, Costa Rica
- Position: Midfielder

Senior career*
Years	Team	Apps	(Gls)
1978–1991	Alajuelense	396	(73)
1992–1993	Carmelita	55	(8)
Total		451	(81)

International career
1983–1990	Costa Rica	14	(2)

Managerial career
- 1999: Alajuelense
- 2000: Municipal Puntarenas
- 2000: Universidad
- 2001–2003: Carmelita
- 2004–: Santa Bárbara
- 2007: Alajuelense
- * Club domestic league appearances and goals

Álvaro Enrique Solano Artavia (born 25 June 1961) is a retired Costa Rican football player, who used to play as a midfielder.

== Club career ==
Solano made his professional debut for Alajuelense on 2 July 1978 against Limonense and went on to play 396 games for them, ranking him 4th on the club's all-time appearances list. He scored his first goal on 18 March 1979 against Barrio México. He later played for Carmelita.

== International career ==
He made his debut for Costa Rica in a March 1983 friendly match against Mexico and earned a total of 14 caps (excluding 12 unofficial matches), scoring 2 goals. He represented his country in 8 FIFA World Cup qualification matches and he played at the 1984 Summer Olympics.

His final international was a February 1990 FIFA World Cup warm-up match against the Soviet Union.

== Managerial career ==
After retiring as a player, he became manager of his beloved Liga in 1999 and also was in charge at Carmelita, Santa Bárbara and Municipal Puntarenas. He returned as caretaker at the helm of Alajuelense in January 2007, replacing Colombian José Cheché Hernández.
