= José Luis Martínez Bazán =

Uruguayan football referee (1942–2015)

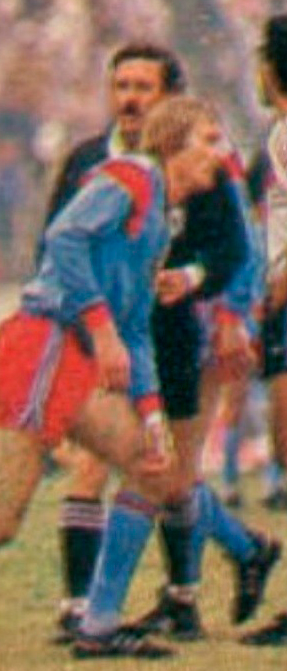
- Bazán pictured in 1986 behind Adrian Bumbescu
- Full name: José Luis Martínez Bazán
- Born: 11 February 1942; Uruguay
- Died: 21 July 2015 (aged 73); Villa del Cerro, Montevideo, Uruguay

Domestic
Years	League	Role

International
Years	League	Role
1986	FIFA listed	Referee

José Luis Martínez Bazán (February 11, 1942 – July 21, 2015 In the Villa del Cerro) was a Uruguayan football referee. He is known for having refereed one match in the 1986 FIFA World Cup in Mexico and also refereed the 1986 Intercontinental Cup.

He died on July 21, 2015, aged 73.
