= Guillermo Guardia =

Costa Rican footballer (born 1960)

Personal information
- Full name: Guillermo Guardia Morales
- Date of birth: February 27, 1960 (age 66)
- Place of birth: San José, Costa Rica
- Height: 1.70 m (5 ft 7 in)
- Position: Striker

Senior career*
Years	Team	Apps	(Gls)
1978–1985	Saprissa		
1986	San Carlos		
1987–1988	Alajuelense		
1989–1990	Uruguay de Coronado		
1991–1992	Turrialba		
1992–1993	Limonense		(14)
1994–1996	Pérez Zeledón		
Total		-	(149)

International career^{‡}
1983–1984	Costa Rica		

Managerial career
- 1997–2000: Pérez Zeledón
- 2001–2002: Santa Bárbara
- 2002: Municipal Liberia
- 2003–2004: San Carlos
- * Club domestic league appearances and goals ‡ National team caps and goals as of 1 June 2014

Guillermo Guardia Morales (born 27 February 1960) is considered one of the best Costa Rican soccer strikers during the 1980s.

== Club career ==
Nicknamed Nica, Guardia played the greatest years of his career for Deportivo Saprissa, where he became the best goal scorer of the Costa Rica's first division during 1981, year when Saprissa finished being the champion. Later he played for Alajuelense and San Carlos among others, totalling 7 different clubs. He is especially remembered for saving an Alajuelense penalty kick when Turrialba goalkeeper Miguel Segura was sent off in a league game and Guardia replaced him in goal on 31 May 1992.

Guardia's great scoring talents and quickness, helped him and teammate Evaristo Coronado form a lethal duo in the early 80s in Saprissa. He scored a total of 149 league goals.

== International career ==
He played with the Costa Rica national football team as well, and was part of Costa Rican squad that played at the 1984 Olympic Games held in Los Angeles.

== Managerial career ==
After retiring, he began his coaching career, and has managed several teams in Costa Rica's first division, such as Pérez Zeledón, Municipal Liberia and San Carlos.
