= Juan Gilberto Funes =

Argentine footballer

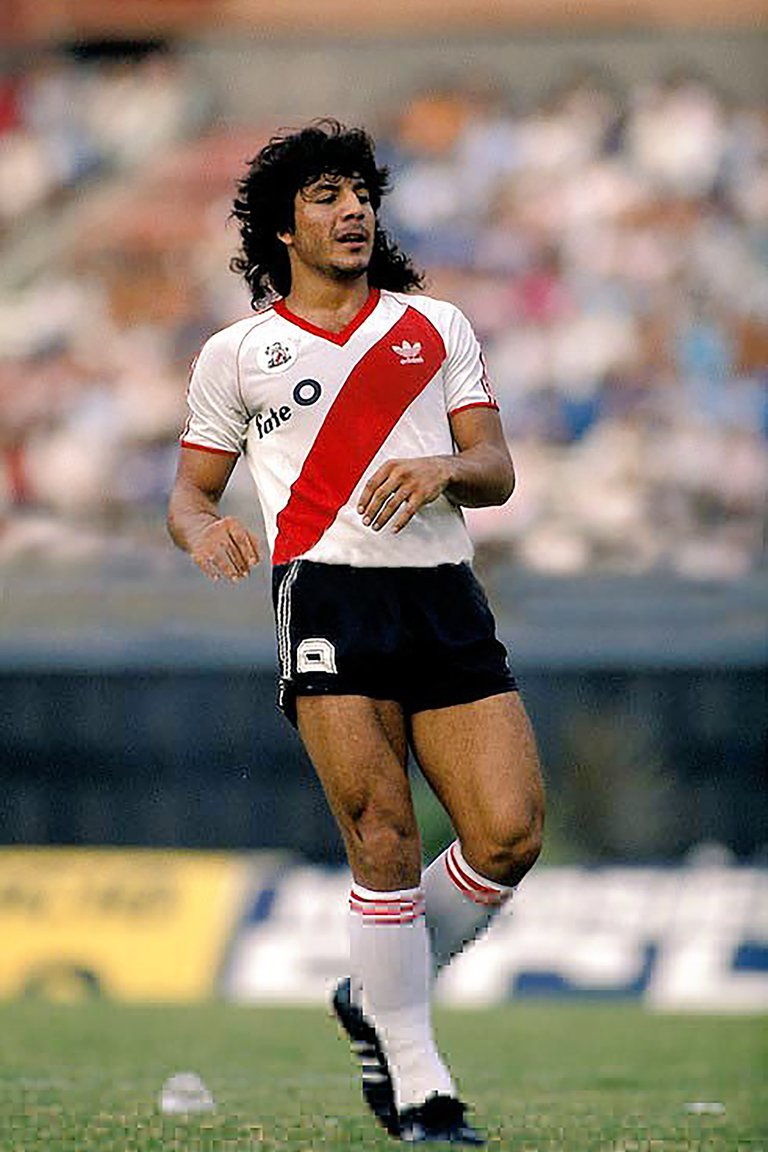
- Funes with River Plate in 1986

Personal information
- Full name: Juan Gilberto Funes Baldovino
- Date of birth: 8 March 1963
- Place of birth: San Luis, Argentina
- Date of death: 11 January 1992 (aged 28)
- Place of death: Buenos Aires, Argentina
- Height: 1.78 m (5 ft 10 in)
- Position: Striker

Senior career*
Years	Team	Apps	(Gls)
1981	Huracán de San Luis		
1982	Sarmiento de Junín		
1983	Jorge Newbery		
1983–1984	Gimnasia y Esgrima (M)	9	(1)
1984–1986	Millonarios	85	(45)
1986–1988	River Plate	84	(47)
1988–1989	Olympiacos	29	(10)
1989–1990	Vélez Sársfield	25	(12)

International career
1987	Argentina	4	(0)
- * Club domestic league appearances and goals

Juan Gilberto Funes Baldovino (8 March 1963 – 11 January 1992), nicknamed "El Búfalo" (The Buffalo), was an Argentine professional footballer who played as a striker, known for his physical style of play. He was a important part of the River Plate team who won the treble in 1986.

== Club career ==
He first played football for local club Huracán de San Luis, then Estudiantes de La Plata, Sarmiento de Junin, Jorge Newbery and Gimnasia y Esgrima de Mendoza, and then for Colombian Millonarios FC in 1984. In that year, his team became runner-up of Colombian Primera A, and the following year he achieved a record 33 goals in a single season. Nowadays, he is one of the most iconic idols of the club.

=== River Plate ===
Funes was a key player in the River Plate team that won the 1986 Copa Libertadores for the first time, in which he scored a goal in the first match in Cali, which River won by the score of 2–1 and at home in Buenos Aires, for the 1–0 victory against América de Cali. Ironically, this was not the first time Colombian teams and fans saw his moves; in the glory days of the Colombian league in the 1980s, Funes played for Millonarios, the team with the most championships in Colombia, where he simply "schooled" other forwards with his opportunistic technique and his attitude.

=== Olympiacos ===
After his tenure on River Plate, Funes moved to Greece where he played for Olympiacos. With the Piraeus club Funes scored some very important goals (2 goals in the 1988 Greek Cup semifinal against OFI, scoring 10 goals in 29 appearances).

=== Vélez Sársfield ===
He returned to his homeland for a second time, being about to play for Boca Juniors but he finally could not debut with the team due to a heart failure detected by the doctors. Despite that, Funes did not end his professional career, joining Vélez Sársfield. However, his health forced him to retire shortly afterwards.

He is considered today one of the great legends of Millonarios de Bogotá, and the River Plate fans remember his goals in the 1986 Copa Libertadores Finals. Millonarios has one group of fans called Barra del Búfalo in honour of the idol of the club.

== International career ==
Funes was capped four times by the Argentina National Team.

== Death ==
He died of a heart attack on 11 January 1992. The Estadio Provincial in San Luis was named "Juan Gilberto Funes" in his honour, in 2003.

== Honours ==
=== Gimnasia y Esgrima ===
- Liga Mendocina de Fútbol: 1983

=== Millonarios F.C. ===
- Categoría Primera A runner-up: 1984

=== River Plate ===
- Copa Libertadores: 1986
- Intercontinental Cup: 1986
- Copa Interamericana: 1986
