= Alejandro González (Costa Rican footballer) =

Costa Rican footballer (born 1955)

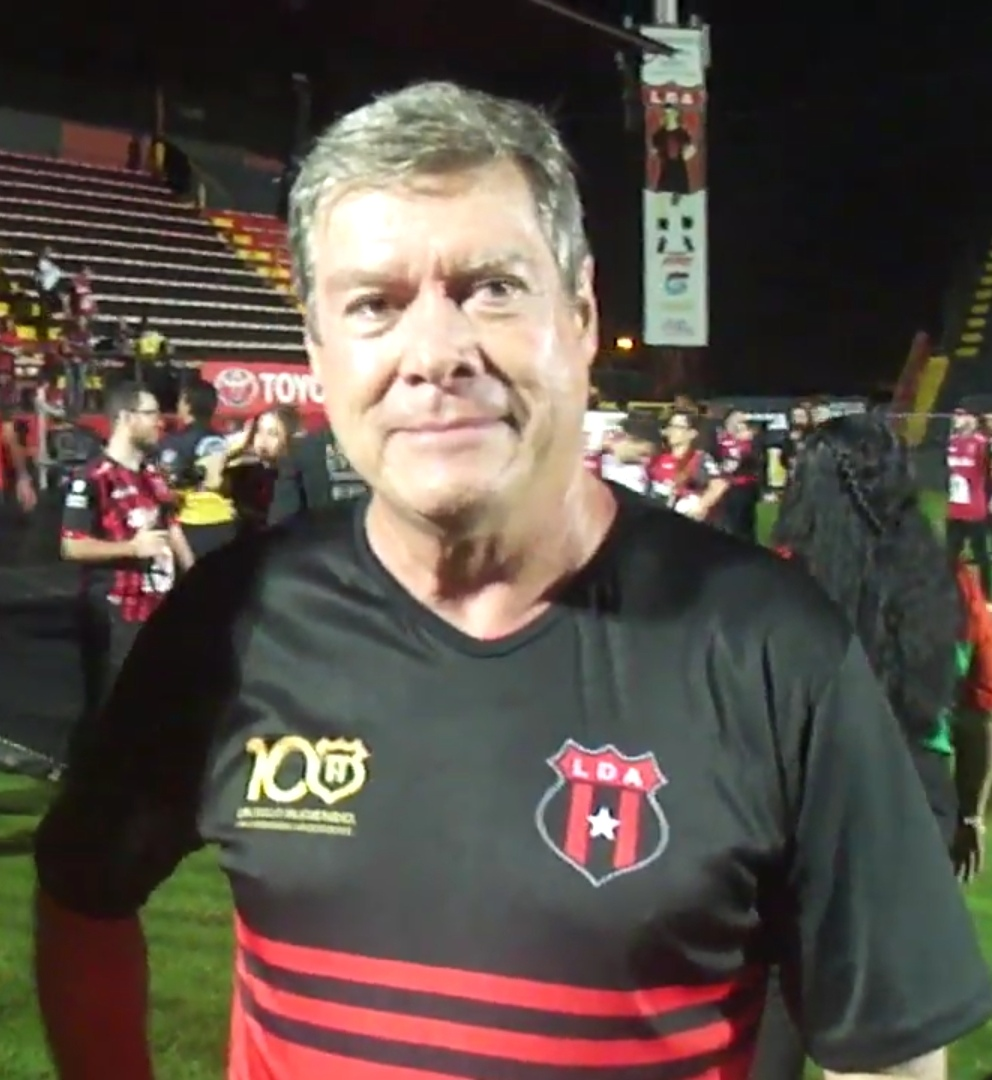

Personal information
- Full name: Alejandro González Rojas
- Date of birth: 3 March 1955 (age 71)
- Place of birth: Atenas, Costa Rica
- Height: 1.80 m (5 ft 11 in)
- Position: Goalkeeper

Senior career*
Years	Team	Apps	(Gls)
1975–1979	Alajuelense		
1979–1980	→Ramonense (loan)		
1980–1990	Alajuelense		(1)
Total		365	(1)

International career
1983–1989	Costa Rica	13	(0)
- * Club domestic league appearances and goals

Alejandro González Rojas (born March 3, 1955) is a former Costa Rican goalkeeper who played most of his career for Alajuelense in the Primera Division de Costa Rica.

== Club career ==
He made his official debut on June 29, 1975, coming up as a substitute on an Alajuelense 4–0 win against Ramonense. After that González played a total of 360 official games in the Primera Division de Costa Rica. He scored his only goal on his final professional match against Uruguay which was won by Alajuelense 4–1 on 23 September 1990, shooting a penalty kick; he was later substituted by up-and-coming goalkeeper Paul Mayorga. González played one final match against Czechoslovak opposition Inter Bratislava in December 1990 on an international friendly which also served as his testimonial. González was again substituted by Mayorga fifteen minutes into the first half.

He kept a record successive clean sheets for la Liga, totalling 844 minutes in the 1982 season which stands as the club record, and for a total 27 years, one month and nine days was the goalkeeper with most appearances for the club with 315. His record stood since his final competitive match on 23 September 1990 and lasted until 1 November 2017 when it was surpassed by current first choice keeper Patrick Pemberton. Pemberton matched González's 315 matches three days earlier on the 29 October 2017 Clásico against Saprissa.

He was part of the Alajuelense team that won league titles in the 1980, 1983–84 and 1984-85 seasons; as well as the team who won the CONCACAF Champions' Cup in 1986. González also played during the 1988 CONCACAF Champions' Cup in which Alajuelense made the semifinals against Club Olimpia. González superbly played on the first leg on Tegucigalpa and earned praise from the Honduran press. He nursed a shoulder injury during part of the second half, which caused him to miss the return leg at Alajuela. Save for this match and the final match of one of the group stages (both played by sub Desiderio Calvo), González made the starting XI on the entire CONCACAF run. He also disputed the Interamerican Cup in 1987 against CA River Plate.

== International career ==
He made his debut for Costa Rica in a March 1983 friendly match against Mexico and earned a total of 13 caps. He represented his country in 5 FIFA World Cup qualification matches and was part of the team that participated in the Los Angeles Summer Olympic Games in 1984. He declined to join Costa Rica's 1990 World Cup squad after falling out with Bora Milutinovic.
