= Mario Pobersnik =

Argentine football manager and player

Personal information
- Full name: Mario Gabriel Pobersnik
- Date of birth: 18 July 1971 (age 55)
- Place of birth: Ramos Mejía, Argentina
- Height: 1.98 m (6 ft 6 in)
- Position: Forward

Youth career
- Ferro Carril Oeste

Senior career*
Years	Team	Apps	(Gls)
1990–1995	Ferro Carril Oeste	163	(37)
1995–1996	Rosario Central	31	(5)
1997–1998	Banfield	24	(1)
1999–2000	Gimnasia La Plata	1	(0)
2001	Platense	10	(0)
2002	Estudiantes BA	22	(1)
2003	Villa Dálmine	29	(13)
2004	Ariano	–	(–)
2004	Guillermo Brown	6	(0)

Managerial career
- 2008–2012: Tigre (youth)
- 2013–2016: Racing Club (youth)
- 2016: Unión La Calera
- 2016: Defensa y Justicia II
- 2017–2019: Boca Juniors II (assistant)
- 2022: Rosario Central (assistant)
- 2023–2024: Independiente (assistant)
- 2024: Rosario Central (assistant)
- 2025–: Rosario Central II
- * Club domestic league appearances and goals

Mario Gabriel Pobersnik (born 18 July 1971) is an Argentine football manager and former player who played as a forward. He is currently in charge of the Rosario Central reserve team.

== Career ==
Born in Ramos Mejía, Argentina, Pobersnik started his career with Ferro Carril Oeste, becoming the top goalscorer for them in the 90's with 36 goals in 163 matches.

Pobersnik developed almost all his career in his homeland playing for Ferro Carril Oeste, Rosario Central, Banfield, Gimnasia y Esgrima La Plata, Platense, Estudiantes de Buenos Aires, Villa Dálmine and Guillermo Brown. With Rosario Central, he won the 1995 Copa CONMEBOL.

Abroad, Pobersnik has a stint with Italian side Ariano in 2004.

As a football coach, Pobersnik started his career with the youth systems of Tigre and Racing Club de Avellaneda. He has also served as an assistant coach in Rosario Central, Independiente and Boca Juniors.

As a head coach, Pobersnik led Chilean club Unión La Calera in the second half of 2016.

In 2025, Pobersnik assumed as coach for the Rosario Central reserve team.
