= Jorge Villazán =

Uruguayan footballer (born 1962)

Personal information
- Full name: Jorge Villazán Guillén
- Date of birth: 5 October 1962 (age 64)
- Place of birth: Durazno, Uruguay
- Height: 1.75 m (5 ft 9 in)
- Position: Midfielder

Senior career*
Years	Team	Apps	(Gls)
1977–1984	Club Nacional de Football		
1985–1986	River Plate		
1986–1987	Gimnasia y Esgrima (LP)		
1987–1989	River Plate		
1989–1990	Club Atlético Platense (Uruguay)		
1990	Montevideo Wanderers		
1991	Progreso		
1992	Alianza Lima		
1993	Deportivo Maldonado		

International career
1983	Uruguay	5	(0)
- * Club domestic league appearances and goals

Jorge Villazán Guillén (born 5 October 1962) is a Uruguayan former footballer who played as a midfielder. He made five appearances for the Uruguay national team in 1983. He was also part of Uruguay's squad for the 1983 Copa América tournament.
