= Claudio Morresi =

Argentine footballer (born 1962)

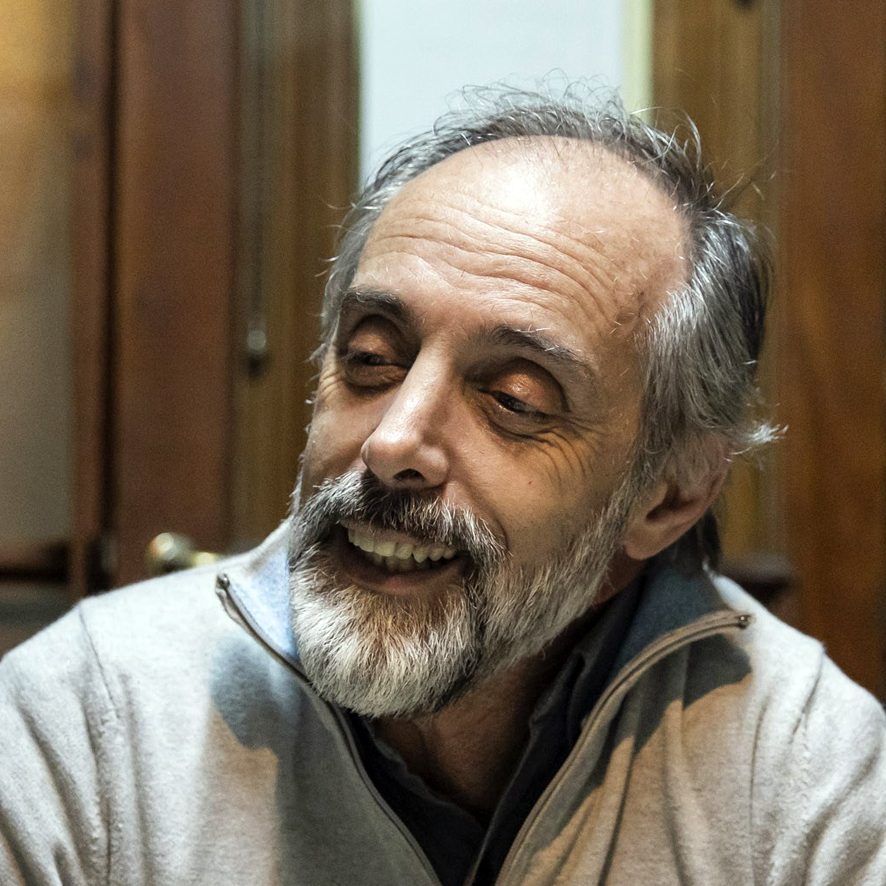
- Morresi in 2019

Personal information
- Full name: Claudio Alberto Morresi
- Date of birth: 30 April 1962 (age 64)
- Place of birth: Buenos Aires, Argentina
- Position: Midfielder

Senior career*
Years	Team	Apps	(Gls)
1980–1985	Huracán	158	(46)
1985–1988	River Plate	79	(27)
1988	Independiente Santa Fe	15	(5)
1988–1990	Vélez Sársfield	48	(10)
1990–1991	Santos Laguna	18	(1)
1991–1992	Platense	9	(1)

International career
1981	Argentina U20	3	(1)
- * Club domestic league appearances and goals

Claudio Alberto Morresi (born 30 April 1962) is an Argentine former footballer and politician. He has served as Sports Secretary of Argentina, and serves as a member of the Buenos Aires City Legislature. He is a member of the Kolina party.

== Career ==
Born in Buenos Aires, Morresi formed with Enzo Francescoli one of the best striking partnerships in soccer at the River Plate football club in the early 1980s.

Morresi played for Argentina at the 1981 FIFA World Youth Championship finals in Australia.

== Honours ==
River Plate

- Primera Division Argentina: 1985–86
- Copa Libertadores: 1986
- Copa Intercontinental: 1986

== Electoral history ==
Electoral history of Claudio Morresi
Election	Office	List	#	District	Votes			Result	Ref.
Election	Office	List	#	District	Total	%	P.	Result	Ref.
2019	City Legislator	Frente de Todos	4	City of Buenos Aires	667,732	33.88%	2nd (Note: Presented on an electoral list. The data shown represents the share of the vote the entire party/alliance received in that constituency.)	Elected	
