= A.D. Santa Bárbara =

Costa Rican football club

- Full name: Asociación Deportiva Santa Bárbara
- Founded: 3 January 1943
- Ground: Estadio Carlos Alvarado Villalobos, Santa Bárbara de Heredia
- Capacity: 1,500

Asociación Deportiva Santa Bárbara is a Costa Rican football club, currently playing in the Tercera División.

They are based in Santa Bárbara de Heredia and play their home games at the Estadio Carlos Alvarado Villalobos.

== History ==
Founded in 1943, Club Sport Barbareño represented Santa Bárbara in the first division of the national football league. Between 1962 and 1975, they played in the third division before winning the title in 1976 and subsequent promotion to the Second Division. The team changed its name to Asociación Deportiva Barbareña in 1984. In 1997 they won promotion to the Costa Rican Primera División and made their debut in the top tier against San Carlos on 17 August 1997. In summer 2000, they announced the arrival of former World Champion Mario Kempes as their new manager, only for the Argentinian to leave the club after a week due to a dispute between the club and the players representatives. In 2004, the team sold their franchise and moved to Puntarenas, becoming Puntarenas F.C.

Santa Bárbara have totalled 7 seasons in the top tier, with a 4th place being their best league result.

== Honours ==
=== National ===
- Segunda División de Costa Rica: 1

1997

- Tercera División de Costa Rica: 1

1976
