= 1986 Copa Libertadores =

27th season of Copa Libertadores

1986 Copa Libertadores de América
Tournament details
- Dates: March 12 – October 29
- Teams: 19 (from 9 associations)

Final positions
- Champions: (Argentina) River Plate (1st title)
- Runners-up: (Colombia) América de Cali

Tournament statistics
- Matches played: 65
- Goals scored: 170 (2.62 per match)
- Top scorer: (Uruguay) Juan Carlos de Lima (9 goals)

The 1986 Copa Libertadores was the 27th edition of the Copa Libertadores, CONMEBOL's annual international club tournament. River Plate won the competition for their first ever title, after winning the first leg 2–1 and the second leg 1–0.

The representatives of Venezuela, Estudiantes de Mérida and Unión Atlético Táchira, did not participate upon the Venezuelan Football Federation's suspension by FIFA.

== Qualified teams ==
Country	Team	Qualification method
CONMEBOL (1 berth)	Argentinos Juniors	1985 Copa Libertadores champion
Argentina (2 berths)	River Plate	1985–86 Primera División champion
Argentina (2 berths)	Boca Juniors	1985–86 Liguilla Pre-Libertadores winner
Bolivia (2 berths)	Bolívar	1985 Primera División champion
Bolivia (2 berths)	Jorge Wilstermann	1985 Primera División runner-up
Brazil (2 berths)	Coritiba	1985 Campeonato Brasileiro Série A champion
Brazil (2 berths)	Bangu	1985 Campeonato Brasileiro Série A runner-up
Chile (2 berths)	Cobresal	1985 Pre-Copa Libertadores play-off winner
Chile (2 berths)	Universidad Católica	1985 Liguilla Pre-Copa Libertadores winner
Colombia (2 berths)	América de Cali	1985 Campeonato Profesional champion
Colombia (2 berths)	Deportivo Cali	1985 Campeonato Profesional runner-up
Ecuador (2 berths)	Barcelona	1985 Campeonato Ecuatoriano champion
Ecuador (2 berths)	Deportivo Quito	1985 Campeonato Ecuatoriano runner-up
Paraguay (2 berths)	Olimpia	1985 Primera División champion
Paraguay (2 berths)	Nacional	1985 Primera División runner-up
Peru (2 berths)	Universitario	1985 Primera División champion
Peru (2 berths)	UTC	1985 Primera División runner-up
Uruguay (2 berths)	Peñarol	1985 Liguilla Pre-Libertadores winner
Uruguay (2 berths)	Montevideo Wanderers	1985 Liguilla Pre-Libertadores runner-up

== Draw ==
The champions and runners-up of each football association were drawn into the same group along with another football association's participating teams. Three clubs from Argentina competed as Argentinos Juniors was champion of the 1985 Copa Libertadores. They entered the tournament in the Semifinals.

Group 1	Group 2	Group 3	Group 4	Group 5
Argentina; Uruguay	Bolivia; Peru	Brazil; Ecuador	Chile; Colombia	Paraguay; Venezuela

== Group stage ==
=== Group 1 ===
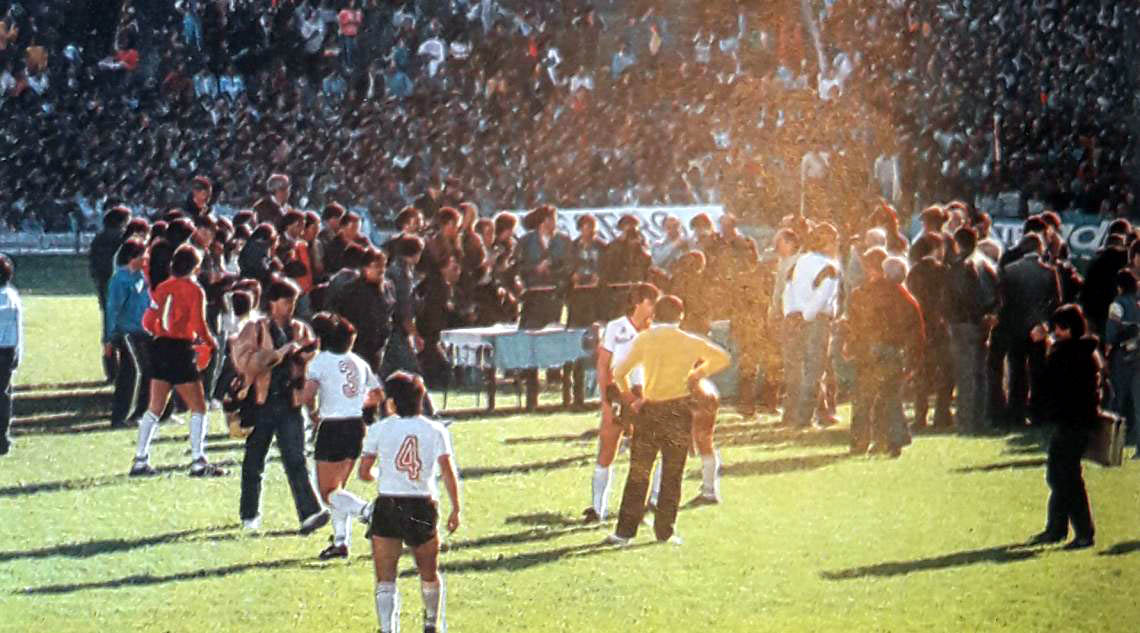
Boca v River at La Bombonera

Pos	Team	Pld	W	D	L	GF	GA	GD	Pts	Qualification	(Argentina) RIV	(Uruguay) WAN	(Argentina) BOC	(Uruguay) PEÑ
1	(Argentina) River Plate	6	5	1	0	13	4	+9	11	Semifinals	—	4–2	1–0	3–1
2	(Uruguay) Montevideo Wanderers	6	3	0	3	10	10	0	6		0–2	—	2–0	3–1
3	(Argentina) Boca Juniors	6	2	2	2	7	8	−1	6		1–1	3–2	—	1–1
4	(Uruguay) Peñarol	6	0	1	5	4	12	−8	1		0–2	0–1	1–2	—

=== Group 2 ===
Pos	Team	Pld	W	D	L	GF	GA	GD	Pts	Qualification	(Bolivia) BOL	(Bolivia) WIL	(Peru) UNI	(Peru) UTC
1	(Bolivia) Bolívar	6	4	1	1	12	7	+5	9	Semifinals	—	2–0	4–0	2–1
2	(Bolivia) Jorge Wilstermann	6	3	0	3	11	8	+3	6		1–2	—	4–0	2–0
3	(Peru) Universitario	6	3	0	3	9	11	−2	6		3–0	1–2	—	2–0
4	(Peru) UTC	6	1	1	4	7	13	−6	3		2–2	3–2	1–3	—

=== Group 3 ===
Pos	Team	Pld	W	D	L	GF	GA	GD	Pts	Qualification	(Ecuador) BAR	(Brazil) COR	(Ecuador) QUI	(Brazil) BAN
1	(Ecuador) Barcelona	6	2	4	0	7	5	+2	8	Semifinals	—	1–1	3–3	1–0
2	(Brazil) Coritiba	6	2	3	1	8	5	+3	7		0–0	—	3–1	2–0
3	(Ecuador) Deportivo Quito	6	2	3	1	12	11	+1	7		0–0	2–1	—	3–1
4	(Brazil) Bangu	6	0	2	4	6	12	−6	2		1–2	1–1	3–3	—

=== Group 4 ===
Pos	Team	Pld	W	D	L	GF	GA	GD	Pts	Qualification	(Colombia) AME	(Colombia) CAL	(Chile) COB	(Chile) CAT
1	(Colombia) América de Cali	6	3	3	0	8	4	+4	9	Semifinals	—	0–0	0–0	2–1
2	(Colombia) Deportivo Cali	6	2	3	1	8	5	+3	7		0–1	—	1–1	3–1
3	(Chile) Cobresal	6	1	5	0	5	4	+1	7		2–2	1–1	—	1–1
4	(Chile) Universidad Católica	6	0	1	5	5	13	−8	1		1–3	1–3	0–1	—

=== Group 5 ===
Pos	Team	Pld	W	D	L	GF	GA	GD	Pts	Qualification	(Paraguay) OLI	(Paraguay) NAC
1	(Paraguay) Olimpia	2	2	0	0	5	2	+3	4	Semifinals	—	3–1
2	(Paraguay) Nacional	2	0	0	2	2	5	−3	0		1–2	—

- The representatives of Venezuela, Estudiantes de Mérida and Unión Atlético Táchira, did not participate upon the Venezuelan Football Federation's suspension by FIFA.

== Semifinals ==
=== Group 1 ===
Pos	Team	Pld	W	D	L	GF	GA	GD	Pts	Qualification	(Argentina) RIV	(Argentina) ARG	(Ecuador) BAR
1	(Argentina) River Plate	4	2	1	1	7	3	+4	5	Finals	—	0–2	4–1
2	(Argentina) Argentinos Juniors	4	2	1	1	3	1	+2	5		0–0	—	1–0
3	(Ecuador) Barcelona	4	1	0	3	2	8	−6	2		0–3	1–0	—

==== Tiebreaker ====
- River Plate qualify due to better goal difference in group.

Team 1	Score	Team 2
River Plate (Argentina)	0–0	(Argentina) Argentinos Juniors

=== Group 2 ===
Pos	Team	Pld	W	D	L	GF	GA	GD	Pts	Qualification	(Colombia) AME	(Paraguay) OLI	(Bolivia) BOL
1	(Colombia) América de Cali	4	2	1	1	4	4	0	5	Finals	—	1–0	2–1
2	(Paraguay) Olimpia	4	1	2	1	5	4	+1	4		1–1	—	3–1
3	(Bolivia) Bolívar	4	1	1	2	5	6	−1	3		2–0	1–1	—

== Finals ==
=== 1st leg ===
1986-10-22

(Colombia) América de Cali	1 – 2	River Plate (Argentina)
Cabañas 46'		Funes 22'; Alonso 25'

Cali, Estadio Pascual Guerrero

=== 2nd leg ===
1986-10-29

River Plate (Argentina)	1 – 0	(Colombia) América de Cali
Funes 69'

Buenos Aires, Estadio Monumental

River Plate won 3–1 on aggregate.

Copa Libertadores
1986 Winner

River Plate
First Title
