= 1985–86 Argentine Primera División =

95th season of top-tier football league in Argentina

Primera División
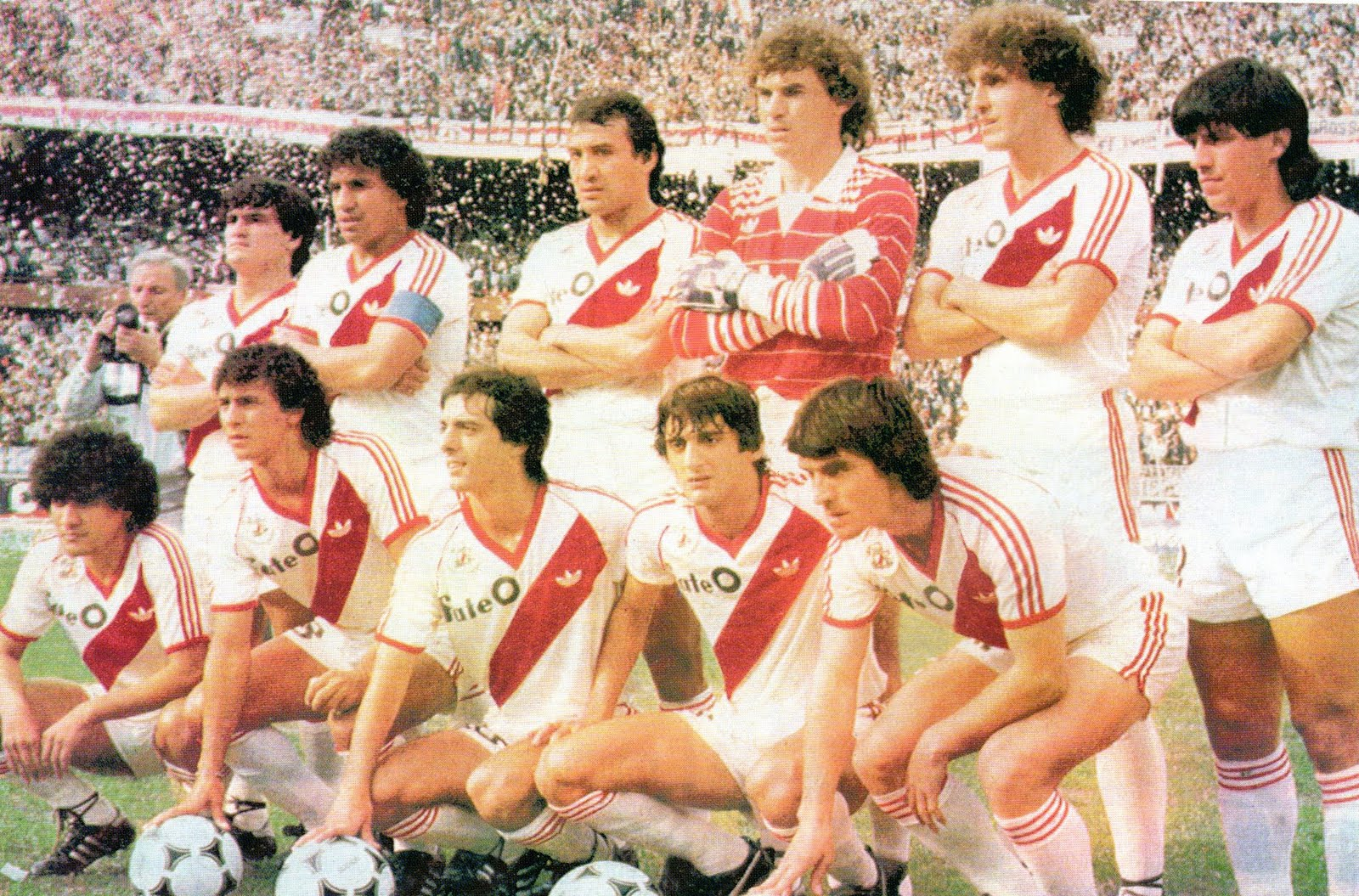
- River Plate, champions
- Season: 1985–86
- Champions: River Plate (21st title)
- Relegated: Chacarita Juniors; Huracán
- 1986 Copa Libertadores: River Plate; Boca Juniors
- Top goalscorer: (Uruguay) Enzo Francescoli (25 goals)

The 1985–86 Argentine Primera División was the 95th season of top-flight football in Argentina. The season began on July 6, 1985 and ended on April 20, 1986.

This tournament saw a major reform in Argentine football, as the European calendar was adopted for the tournament format. River Plate won the league title for the 21st time.

== League table ==
Pos	Team	Pld	W	D	L	GF	GA	GD	Pts
1	River Plate	36	23	10	3	74	26	+48	56
2	Newell's Old Boys	36	15	16	5	46	30	+16	46
3	Deportivo Español	36	18	10	8	41	35	+6	46
4	Argentinos Juniors	36	16	12	8	47	39	+8	44
5	Boca Juniors	36	14	13	9	57	47	+10	41
6	Ferro Carril Oeste	36	12	16	8	45	33	+12	40
7	San Lorenzo	36	14	12	10	43	33	+10	40
8	Talleres (C)	36	10	17	9	43	37	+6	37
9	Independiente	36	15	6	15	38	36	+2	36
10	Gimnasia y Esgrima (LP)	36	9	18	9	29	36	−7	36
11	Instituto	36	11	13	12	33	33	0	35
12	Vélez Sársfield	36	11	12	13	48	48	0	34
13	Huracán	36	10	12	14	44	47	−3	32
14	Unión	36	9	13	14	27	38	−11	31
15	Temperley	36	8	13	15	44	60	−16	29
16	Estudiantes (LP)	36	10	7	19	33	47	−14	27
17	Platense	36	7	13	16	37	55	−18	27
18	Racing (C)	36	6	14	16	31	52	−21	26
19	Chacarita Juniors	36	5	11	20	24	53	−29	21

== Relegation ==
Relegation was determined by averaging the number of points obtained over the three previous seasons

=== Relegation table ===
Team	1983	1984	1985–86	Total points	Seasons	Points average
Deportivo Español	N/A	N/A	46	46	1	46.00
Ferro Carril Oeste	46	50	40	136	3	45.33
Argentinos Juniors	36	51	44	131	3	43.66
River Plate	29	43	56	128	3	42.33
San Lorenzo	47	37	40	124	3	41.33
Vélez Sársfield	44	42	34	120	3	40.00
Newell's Old Boys	35	38	46	119	3	39.67
Independiente	48	31	36	115	3	38.33
Estudiantes (LP)	38	48	27	113	3	37.67
Boca Juniors	37	30	41	108	3	36.00
Gimnasia y Esgrima (LP)	N/A	N/A	36	36	1	36.00
Talleres (C)	33	34	37	104	3	34.67
Instituto	35	33	35	103	3	34.33
Unión	38	30	31	99	3	33.00
Racing (C)	27	43	26	96	3	32.00
Platense	34	33	27	94	3	31.33
Temperley	33	31	29	93	3	31.00
Huracán	32	27	32	91	3	30.33
Chacarita Juniors	N/A	34	21	55	2	27.50

- Chacarita Juniors were relegated directly
- Huracán played in the Octagonal promotion tournament.

== Qualification for Copa Libertadores 1986 ==
- River Plate qualified as League champions
- Argentinos Juniors qualified as Copa Libertadores holders
- The remaining qualification place was determined by the Liguella Pre-Libertadores

=== Liguilla Pre-Libertadores ===
Qualifying round

Home (1st leg)	Home (2nd leg)	1st Leg	2nd leg	Aggregate
Alianza (CCo)	Boca Juniors	1-2	1-2	2-4
Concepción	Vélez Sársfield	0-3	1-2	1-5
Ferro Carril Oeste	Güemes	2-1	2-1	4-2
San Lorenzo	Guaraní Antonio Franco	4-1	3-0	7-1

Quarter-finals

		Score
Ferro Carril Oeste	Deportivo Español	4-1 (aet)
Newell's Old Boys	Belgrano	2-1
Olimpo	Boca Juniors	2-3
San Lorenzo	Vélez Sársfield	0-0 (4-3 p.k.)

Semi-finals

Home (1st leg)	Home (2nd leg)	1st Leg	2nd leg	Aggregate
Newell's Old Boys	Ferro Carril Oeste	1-0	1-1	2-1
San Lorenzo	Boca Juniors	1-2	0-0	1-2

Final

Home (1st leg)	Home (2nd leg)	1st Leg	2nd leg	Aggregate
Boca Juniors	Newell's Old Boys	0-2	4-1	4-3

- Boca Juniors qualified for the 1986 Copa Libertadores.

== See also ==
- 1985-86 in Argentine football
