= 2008 Colo-Colo season =

Colo-Colo
2008 season
- Presidents: Cristián Varela (Corporación); Gabriel Ruiz-Tagle (Blanco y Negro)
- Coach: Claudio Borghi (until 28 March); Fernando Astengo (until 23 August); Marcelo Barticciotto
- Stadium: Estadio Monumental
- Torneo Apertura: Runners-up
- Torneo Clausura: Winners
- Copa Chile: Quarterfinals
- Copa Libertadores: Group stage
- Top goalscorer: League: Lucas Barrios (37 goals); All: Lucas Barrios (42 goals)
- Biggest win: 5–1 vs Unión Española (9 March, Torneo Apertura)
- Biggest defeat: 0–3 vs Club Atlas (21 February, Copa Libertadores); 1–4 vs Ñublense (24 February, Torneo Apertura); 0–3 vs Everton (3 June, Torneo Apertura Final)
Home colours	Away colours	Third colours

The 2008 Colo-Colo season players and competition. "Club Social y Deportivo Colo-Colo" (Spanish pronunciation: [ˌkolo ˈkolo]) is a Chilean professional football club based in Macul, Santiago, founded in 1925.

== Players ==
=== Squad information ===
Note: Flags indicate national team as defined under FIFA eligibility rules; some limited exceptions apply. Players may hold more than one non-FIFA nationality.

No.	Pos.	Nation	Player
1	GK	ARG	Cristián Muñoz
2	DF	CHI	Jorge Carrasco
3	DF	CHI	Luis Mena
4	MF	CHI	Roberto Cereceda
5	DF	CHI	Miguel Riffo
6	FW	CHI	José Luis Cabión
7	FW	CHI	Eduardo Rubio
8	FW	ARG	Lucas Barrios
9	FW	CHI	Rodolfo Moya
10	MF	CHI	Daniel González
11	FW	CHI	Gonzalo Fierro
12	GK	CHI	Rainer Wirth
14	MF	CHI	Rodrigo Millar
15	MF	CHI	Moisés Villarroel
16	DF	CHI	Ricardo Rojas

No.	Pos.	Nation	Player
17	MF	CHI	Arturo Sanhueza (captain)
18	MF	CHI	Rodrigo Meléndez
19	MF	CHI	Cristobal Jorquera
20	MF	COL	Carlos Salazar
21	DF	CHI	Bastián Arce
22	FW	CHI	José Pedro Fuenzalida
23	MF	CHI	Fernando Meneses
24	MF	PAR	Domingo Salcedo
25	GK	CHI	Raúl Olivares
26	FW	COL	John Jairo Castillo
27	DF	CHI	Gonzalo Jara
30	FW	CHI	Johan González
31	DF	CHI	Bruno Romo
33	MF	CHI	Mauro Silva
35	MF	CHI	Boris Sagredo

== Transfers ==
=== Apertura ===
In

- (Argentina) Lucas Barrios from (Mexico) Atlas (On Loan)
- (Chile) Ricardo Rojas from (Mexico) América
- (Chile) Daniel González from (Chile) O'Higgins
- (Paraguay) José Domingo Salcedo from (Argentina) Racing Club de Avellaneda
- (Chile) Cristobal Jorquera from (Chile) Unión Española (Loan return)
- (Chile) Fernando Meneses from (Chile) Cobreloa (Loan return)
- (Chile) Raúl Olivares from (Chile) Santiago Morning (Loan return)
- (Chile) José Pedro Fuenzalida from (Chile) Universidad Católica
- (Colombia) John Jairo Castillo from (Venezuela) Guaros FC
- (Colombia) Carlos Eduardo Salazar from (Colombia) Deportes Tolima

Out

- (Colombia) Giovanni Hernandez to (Colombia) Atlético Junior
- (Chile) David Henriquez to (Mexico) Dorados de Sinaloa
- (Chile) Miguel Aceval to (Uruguay) Defensor Sporting
- (Chile) Rodrigo Millar to (Colombia) Once Caldas
- (Argentina) Claudio Bieler to (Ecuador) LDU Quito
- (Chile) David Henriquez to (Mexico) Dorados de Sinaloa
- (Chile) Boris González to (Chile) Universidad Católica
- (Chile) Richard Leyton to (Chile) Puerto Montt (Loaned)
- (Chile) Ariel Salinas to (Chile) Unión San Felipe (Loaned)
- (Chile) Juan Pablo Arenas to (Chile) Deportes Melipilla (Loaned)

=== Clausura ===
In

- (Colombia) Macnelly Torres from (Colombia) Cúcuta Deportivo
- (Chile) Daud Gazale from (Chile) Deportes Concepción
- (Chile) Gerardo Cortés from (Chile) Deportes Concepción
- (Chile) Juan Gonzalo Lorca from (Netherlands) Vitesse Arnhem
- (Chile) Luis Pedro Figueroa from (Chile) Cobreloa
- (Chile) Rodrigo Millar from (Colombia) Once Caldas

Out

- (Chile) José Luis Cabión to (Chile) Everton
- (Colombia) John Jairo Castillo to (Chile) Everton
- (Chile) Eduardo Rubio to (Switzerland) FC Basel
- (Colombia) Carlos Eduardo Salazar to (Colombia) Deportivo Pereira
- (Chile) Gerardo Cortés from (Chile) Deportes Concepción
- (Uruguay) Gustavo Biscayzacu to (Mexico) Club Necaxa
- (Chile) José Pedro Fuenzalida to (Chile) O'Higgins
- (Chile) Rafael Caroca to (Chile) O'Higgins
- (Chile) Daniel González to (Chile) Cobreloa (loan)
- (Chile) Fernando Meneses to (Chile) Universidad de Concepción (loan)
- (Chile) Boris Sagredo to (Chile) Palestino (loan)
- (Chile) Gonzalo Fierro to (Brazil) Flamengo

== Pre-season and friendlies ==
16 January 2008 Copa Ciudad de Osorno, Semifinals	Colo-Colo	2–2 (4–3 p)	Unión Española	Osorno
20:30	Biscayzacú 17'; Barrios 60'	Report	Sierra 6'; Fuentes 29'	Stadium: Rubén Marcos; Referee: Eduardo Gamboa

20 January 2008 Copa Ciudad de Osorno, Final	Colo-Colo	0–1	Universidad Católica	Osorno
20:30	Sanhueza (red card)	Report	Bottinelli 68'	Stadium: Rubén Marcos; Referee: Guido Aros

30 January 2008 Copa Movistar	Colo-Colo	3–3 (4–5 p)	Universidad de Chile	Talca
22:00	Biscayzacú 40', 57'; Barrios 69'	Report	Díaz 46'; Gómez 52', 87'	Stadium: Fiscal; Attendance: 10,000; Referee: Jorge Osorio
	Penalties
	Millar (penalty scored); Carrasco (penalty scored); Jorquera (penalty scored); Barrios (penalty scored); Mena (penalty missed)		(penalty scored) Olarra; (penalty scored) Díaz; (penalty scored) Gómez; (penalty scored) Rivera; (penalty scored) Martínez

25 June 2008 Copa Gato	Colo-Colo	2–1	Universidad de Chile	Iquique
22:00	Gazale 9'; Riffo (red card) 76'; Fierro 90+1' (pen.)	Report	Villalobos (red card) 15'; O. González 36'	Stadium: Tierra de Campeones; Attendance: 10,000; Referee: Claudio Puga

2 September 2008 Copa Revancha	Colo-Colo	0–5	Everton	Macul, Santiago
22:00		Report	Canío 8', 30', 45'; Reyes 60'; Rojas 85' (pen.)	Stadium: Monumental; Referee: Claudio Fuenzalida

== Competitions ==
=== Torneo Apertura ===
==== Regular season table ====
Group 3

Pos	Team	Pld	W	D	L	GF	GA	GD	Pts	Qualification
1	Colo-Colo	19	7	6	6	35	29	+6	27	Play-offs
2	Cobreloa	19	6	5	8	25	29	−4	23	Repechage
3	Deportes Antofagasta	19	4	5	10	16	29	−13	17	
4	Provincial Osorno	19	5	1	13	19	38	−19	16	
5	Deportes Melipilla	19	3	1	15	22	40	−18	10	

Source: RSSSF, El Mercurio

==== Regular season matches ====
25 January 2008 1	Provincial Osorno	0–3	Colo-Colo	Osorno
		Report	Aguilar 12' (o.g.); D. González 20'; Barrios 76'	Stadium: Rubén Marcos

2 February 2008 2	Colo-Colo	4–3	Deportes Melipilla	Macul, Santiago
	Barrios 21', 66'; Biscayzacú 51', 90+2'	Report	Riffo 25' (o.g.); Díaz 29' (pen.); Muñoz 70'	Stadium: Monumental

9 February 2008 3	Palestino	1–0	Colo-Colo	La Serena
	Úbeda 24'	Report		Stadium: La Portada

13 February 2008 4	Colo-Colo	1–0	Universidad de Concepción	Macul, Santiago
	Salazar 42'	Report		Stadium: Monumental

17 February 2008 5	Rangers	2–2	Colo-Colo	Talca
	Barra 42' (pen.); Palma 90'	Report	Castillo 35'; Jorquera 75'	Stadium: Fiscal

24 February 2008 6	Colo-Colo	1–4	Ñublense	Macul, Santiago
	Sagredo 15'	Report	Cantero 12'; Cisternas 16', 55'; Cabión 32' (o.g.)	Stadium: Monumental

2 March 2008 7	Colo-Colo	0–1	Universidad Católica	Macul, Santiago
		Report	Bottinelli 26'	Stadium: Monumental

9 March 2008 9	Unión Española	1–5	Colo-Colo	Talca
	Cáceres 58'	Report	Biscayzacú 17'; Barrios 18', 74'; Salazar 66'; D. González 88'	Stadium: Fiscal
Note: The match was originally set at the Estadio Nacional in Santiago, but was moved due to the Iron Maiden concert (as part of the Somewhere Back in Time World Tour) being held at the same day.

12 March 2008 10	Colo-Colo	1–1	O'Higgins	Macul, Santiago
	Salcedo 26'	Report	Gómez 81'	Stadium: Monumental

15 March 2008 11	Santiago Morning	1–3	Colo-Colo	Ñuñoa, Santiago
	Paredes 13'	Report	Barrios 7', 14'; D. González 88' (pen.)	Stadium: Nacional

23 March 2008 12	Colo-Colo	2–1	Deportes Antofagasta	Macul, Santiago
	Barrios 10'; Fuenzalida 34'	Report	Guerrero 87' (pen.)	Stadium: Monumental

30 March 2008 13	Deportes Concepción	2–2	Colo-Colo	Concepción
	Gazale 33'; Almendra 57' (pen.)	Report	Biscayzacú 12'; Barrios 50'	Stadium: Collao

5 April 2008 14	Colo-Colo	3–1	Everton	Macul, Santiago
	D. González 60'; Biscayzacú 61'; Barrios 68'	Report	Sánchez 56'	Stadium: Monumental

13 April 2008 15	Universidad de Chile	1–0	Colo-Colo	Ñuñoa, Santiago
	Villalobos 32'	Report		Stadium: Nacional

16 April 2008 8(*)	Audax Italiano	3–2	Colo-Colo	Ñuñoa, Santiago
	Villanueva 45'; Ramos 58'; Orellana 74' (pen.)	Report	Barrios 7'; Rubio 90'	Stadium: Nacional
Note: The match was originally scheduled between 5 and 6 March, but was postponed in order to allow Audax Italiano to play against São Paulo at the Copa Libertadores (5 March).

19 April 2008 16	Colo-Colo	0–0	Cobreloa	Macul, Santiago
		Report		Stadium: Monumental

26 April 2008 17	Deportes La Serena	2–2	Colo-Colo	La Serena
	Salazar 58'; Tapia 67'	Report	Barrios 39', 81'	Stadium: La Portada

29 April 2008 18	Colo-Colo	2–2	Huachipato	Macul, Santiago
	Biscayzacú 55', 87'	Report	Monje 35', 68'	Stadium: Monumental

3 May 2008 19	Cobresal	3–2	Colo-Colo	Calama
	Oyarzún 51', 68'; Silva 89'	Report	Barrios 37', 83'	Stadium: Municipal
Note: Cobresal could not use the Estadio El Cobre as its home soil due to a strike of subcontractor workers.

==== Play-offs ====
Quarter-finals

10 May 2008 Leg 1	Colo-Colo	3–1	Universidad Católica	Macul, Santiago
18:30	Jorquera 12'; Fierro 50'; Barrios 63'	Report	M. González 34'; Acevedo (red card) 85'; Bottinelli (red card) 85'; Imboden (red card) 90'	Stadium: Monumental; Attendance: 22,000; Referee: Enrique Osses

13 May 2008 Leg 2	Universidad Católica	1–1 (2–4 agg.)	Colo-Colo	Ñuñoa, Santiago
18:30	Toloza 28' (pen.)	Report	D. González 23'	Stadium: Nacional; Attendance: 25,000; Referee: Pablo Pozo

Semi-finals

18 May 2008 Leg 1	Colo-Colo	0–1	Ñublense	Macul, Santiago
16:00		Report	Cantero 18'	Stadium: Monumental; Attendance: 25,000; Referee: Jorge Osorio

21 May 2008 Leg 2	Ñublense	1–2 (2–2a agg.)	Colo-Colo	Concepción
15:30	Flores 45+1'	Report	Barrios 81', 83'	Stadium: Collao; Attendance: 25,000; Referee: Pablo Pozo

Finals

28 May 2008 Leg 1	Colo-Colo	2–0	Everton	Macul, Santiago
19:30	Barrios 85'; Fierro 90+1'	Report	Arias (red card) 59'	Stadium: Monumental; Attendance: 40,000; Referee: Pablo Pozo

3 June 2008 Leg 2	Everton	3–0 (3–2 agg.)	Colo-Colo	Viña del Mar
19:30	Miralles 46', 76'; Riveros 71'	Report		Stadium: Sausalito; Attendance: 19,000; Referee: Rubén Selman

=== Torneo Clausura ===
==== Regular season table ====
Group 1

Pos	Team	Pld	W	D	L	GF	GA	GD	Pts	Qualification or relegation
1	Universidad de Chile	18	12	2	4	39	21	+18	38	Play-offs
2	Colo-Colo	18	10	3	5	32	19	+13	33	Play-offs
3	Unión Española	18	7	4	7	28	32	−4	25	
4	Ñublense	18	3	8	7	21	29	−8	17	
5	Deportes Concepción (D)	0	0	0	0	0	0	0	0	Relegated to Primera B

Source: RSSSF, El Mercurio
(D) Disqualified

==== Regular season matches ====
29 June 2008 2	Deportes Melipilla	0–2	Colo-Colo	Melipilla
		Report	Gazale 24'; Jorquera 52'	Stadium: Roberto Bravo

6 July 2008 3	Colo-Colo	0–0	Palestino	Macul, Santiago
		Report		Stadium: Monumental

13 July 2008 4	Universidad de Concepción	1–2	Colo-Colo	Concepción
	Meneses 80'	Report	Fierro 2', 52'	Stadium: Collao

16 July 2008 1(*)	Colo-Colo	4–1	Provincial Osorno	Macul, Santiago
	Gazale 9'; Fierro 13'; Torres 30', 55'	Report	Teuber 40'	Stadium: Monumental
Note: The match was originally scheduled between 21 and 22 June, but was postponed in order to give Colo-Colo recovery time after the Apertura Final.

20 July 2008 5	Colo-Colo	2–3	Rangers	Macul, Santiago
	Gazale 23'; Figueroa 90'	Report	Barra 45+1'; Cellerino 52', 82'	Stadium: Monumental

27 July 2008 6	Ñublense	1–2	Colo-Colo	Concepción
	Cantero 69'	Report	Barrios 1', 63'	Stadium: Collao

3 August 2008 7	Universidad Católica	1–0	Colo-Colo	Ñuñoa, Santiago
	Caggiano 37'	Report		Stadium: Nacional

9 August 2008 8	Colo-Colo	1–1	Audax Italiano	Macul, Santiago
	Figueroa 35'	Report	Gigena 28'	Stadium: Monumental

15 August 2008 9	Colo-Colo	2–1	Unión Española	Macul, Santiago
	Millar 75'; Torres 83'	Report	Pérez 55'	Stadium: Monumental
Note: Match was suspended at the 18th minute due to intense rain. Play was resumed in 27 August

24 August 2008 10	O'Higgins	0–3	Colo-Colo	Rancagua
		Report	Fierro 8'; Jorquera 14'; Torres 86'	Stadium: El Teniente

30 August 2008 11	Colo-Colo	2–1	Santiago Morning	Macul, Santiago
	Barrios 42', 63'	Report	Paredes 78'	Stadium: Monumental

14 September 2008 12	Deportes Antofagasta	1–0	Colo-Colo	Antofagasta
	Pedrozo 76'	Report		Stadium: Regional

13	Colo-Colo	Cancelled	Deportes Concepción
Note: On 26 June, the ANFP declared "economic insolvency" on Deportes Concepción and ordered its relegation to Primera B. Therefore, all of its matches for the Torneo Clausura were cancelled.

28 September 2008 14	Everton	3–1	Colo-Colo	Viña del Mar
	Miralles 67', 88'; Saavedra 90'	Report	Torres 54'	Stadium: Sausalito

5 October 2008 15	Colo-Colo	2–0	Universidad de Chile	Macul, Santiago
	Barrios 35', 74'	Report		Stadium: Monumental

19 October 2008 16	Cobreloa	4–3	Colo-Colo	Calama
	Savoia 17', 42'; D. González 32' (pen.); Mannara 38'	Report	Torres 44'; Barrios 60' (pen.), 65'	Stadium: Municipal

24 October 2008 17	Colo-Colo	3–0	Deportes La Serena	Macul, Santiago
	Barrios 8', 16', 88'	Report		Stadium: Monumental

2 November 2008 18	Huachipato	0–2	Colo-Colo	Concepción
		Report	Gazale 39', 87'	Stadium: Collao

9 November 2008 19	Colo-Colo	1–1	Cobresal	Macul, Santiago
	Millar 21'	Report	Olea 72'	Stadium: Monumental

==== Play-offs ====
Quarter-finals

15 November 2008 Leg 1	Huachipato	1–1	Colo-Colo	Concepción
18:15	García 45+1' (pen.)	Report	Barrios 36'	Stadium: Collao; Attendance: 12,000; Referee: Rubén Selman

22 November 2008 Leg 2	Colo-Colo	4–2 (5–3 agg.)	Huachipato	Macul, Santiago
19:00	Gazale 13'; Barrios 54', 67'; Cereceda (red card) 75'; Figueroa 89'	Report	Rebolledo 41'; Monje (red card) 75'; Cortés 80'	Stadium: Monumental; Attendance: 35,000; Referee: Enrique Osses

Semi-finals

29 November 2008 Leg 1	Cobreloa	3–3	Colo-Colo	Calama
16:00	Benítez 20'; Savoia 35', 75'	Report	Moya 8'; Torres 45'; Meléndez (red card) 49'; Gazale 70'	Stadium: Municipal; Attendance: 12,000; Referee: Jorge Osorio

6 December 2008 Leg 2	Colo-Colo	2–2 (5a–5 agg.)	Cobreloa	Macul, Santiago
20:00	Barrios 44', 46'	Report	Mannara 14'; D. González 71' (pen.)	Stadium: Monumental; Attendance: 40,000; Referee: Carlos Chandía

Finals

14 December 2008 Leg 1	Palestino	1–1	Colo-Colo	Ñuñoa, Santiago
18:30	Núñez (red card) 27'; Bishara (red card); Ibáñez 79'	Report	Barrios 28'	Stadium: Nacional; Attendance: 30,000; Referee: Rubén Selman

20 December 2008 Leg 2	Colo-Colo	3–1 (4–2 agg.)	Palestino	Macul, Santiago
18:30	Barrios 27'; Gazale 50'; Millar 61'	Report	Pavez 37'; Pineda (red card) 74'	Stadium: Monumental; Attendance: 45,000; Referee: Carlos Chandía

=== Copa Chile ===
1st Round	Bye	{{{team2}}}

25 September 2008 2nd Round	Fernández Vial	2–4	Colo-Colo	Concepción
	D. Campo 27' (pen.); Ó. Reyes 78'	Report	Carrasco 13'; Barrios 39'; Pinto 55'; Jorquera 90+2'	Stadium: Collao; Attendance: 10,000; Referee: Eduardo Gamboa

30 October 2008 3rd Round	Unión La Calera	3–3 (4–5 p)	Colo-Colo	La Calera
	Estay 11', 58'; Pereyra 43'	Report; Report	Barrios 10', 29'; Salcedo 90+3'	Stadium: Nicolás Chahuán; Attendance: 10,000; Referee: Julio Bascuñán
	Penalties
	Pereyra (penalty scored); R. Corrales (penalty scored); C. Cancino (penalty missed); K. Tapia (penalty scored); Estay (penalty scored)		(penalty scored) Barrios; (penalty scored) Salcedo; (penalty scored) Pinto; (penalty scored) Jorquera; (penalty scored) Cereceda

3 February 2009 Quarterfinals	Deportes Ovalle	2–2 (4–1 p)	Colo-Colo	Coquimbo
	Cuéllar 24'; E. González 41'	Report	Cereceda 20'; Barrios 58'	Stadium: Francisco Sánchez Rumoroso; Attendance: 10,000; Referee: Patricio Polic
	Penalties
	J. Canales (penalty scored); J. Yáñez (penalty scored); H. Acevedo (penalty scored); Gaete (penalty scored)		(penalty missed) Barrios; (penalty missed) Cabrera; (penalty scored) Torres

Source: RSSSF

=== Copa Libertadores ===
Pos	Team	Pld	W	D	L	GF	GA	GD	Pts	Qualification	ATL	BOC	CC	MAR
1	(Mexico) Club Atlas	6	3	2	1	11	6	+5	11	Knockout stage	—	3–1	3–0	3–0
2	(Argentina) Boca Juniors	6	3	1	2	12	9	+3	10	Knockout stage	3–0	—	4–3	3–0
3	(Chile) Colo-Colo	6	3	1	2	11	9	+2	10		1–1	2–0	—	2–0
4	(Venezuela) U.A. Maracaibo	6	0	2	4	3	13	−10	2		1–1	1–1	1–3	—

Source: RSSSF

21 February 2008 Matchday 1	Club Atlas (Mexico)	3–0	(Chile) Colo-Colo	Guadalajara, Mexico
20:40 (CT)	Marioni 7'; Colotto 40'; Medina 67'	Report		Stadium: Jalisco; Attendance: 46,846; Referee: Federico Beligoy (Argentina)

28 February 2008 Matchday 2	U.A. Maracaibo (Venezuela)	1–3	(Chile) Colo-Colo	Maracaibo, Venezuela
19:50 (VET)	H. Díaz 90+2'	Report	Fierro 48'; Biscayzacú 68'; Lancken 86' (o.g.)	Stadium: José Pachencho Romero; Attendance: 42,215; Referee: Samuel Haro (Ecuador)

20 March 2008 Matchday 3	Colo-Colo (Chile)	2–0	(Argentina) Boca Juniors	Santiago, Chile
20:00 (CLST)	Jorquera 3'; Biscayzacú 34'; Barrios (red card) 64'	Report	Morel (red card) 64'	Stadium: Monumental; Attendance: 45,000; Referee: Martín Vázquez (Uruguay)

27 March 2008 Matchday 4	Boca Juniors (Argentina)	4–3	(Chile) Colo-Colo	Buenos Aires, Argentina
21:00 (ART)	Monzón (red card) 22'; Palermo 29'; Gracián 49'; Palacio 65'; N Cardozo 88'	Report	Biscayzacú 25', 43'; Moya 90+2'	Stadium: La Bombonera; Attendance: 50,000; Referee: Carlos Amarilla (Paraguay)

10 April 2008 Matchday 5	Colo-Colo (Chile)	2–0	(Venezuela) U.A. Maracaibo	Santiago, Chile
20:00 (CLST)	Biscayzacú 47'; Barrios 50'	Report		Stadium: Monumental; Attendance: 30,000; Referee: René Ortubé (Bolivia)

22 April 2008 Matchday 6	Colo-Colo (Chile)	1–1	(Mexico) Club Atlas	Santiago, Chile
20:10 (CLT)	Rojas 5'	Report	Colotto 65'	Stadium: Monumental; Attendance: 20,000; Referee: Jorge Larrionda (Uruguay)
