= 1984 Campeonato Nacional finals =

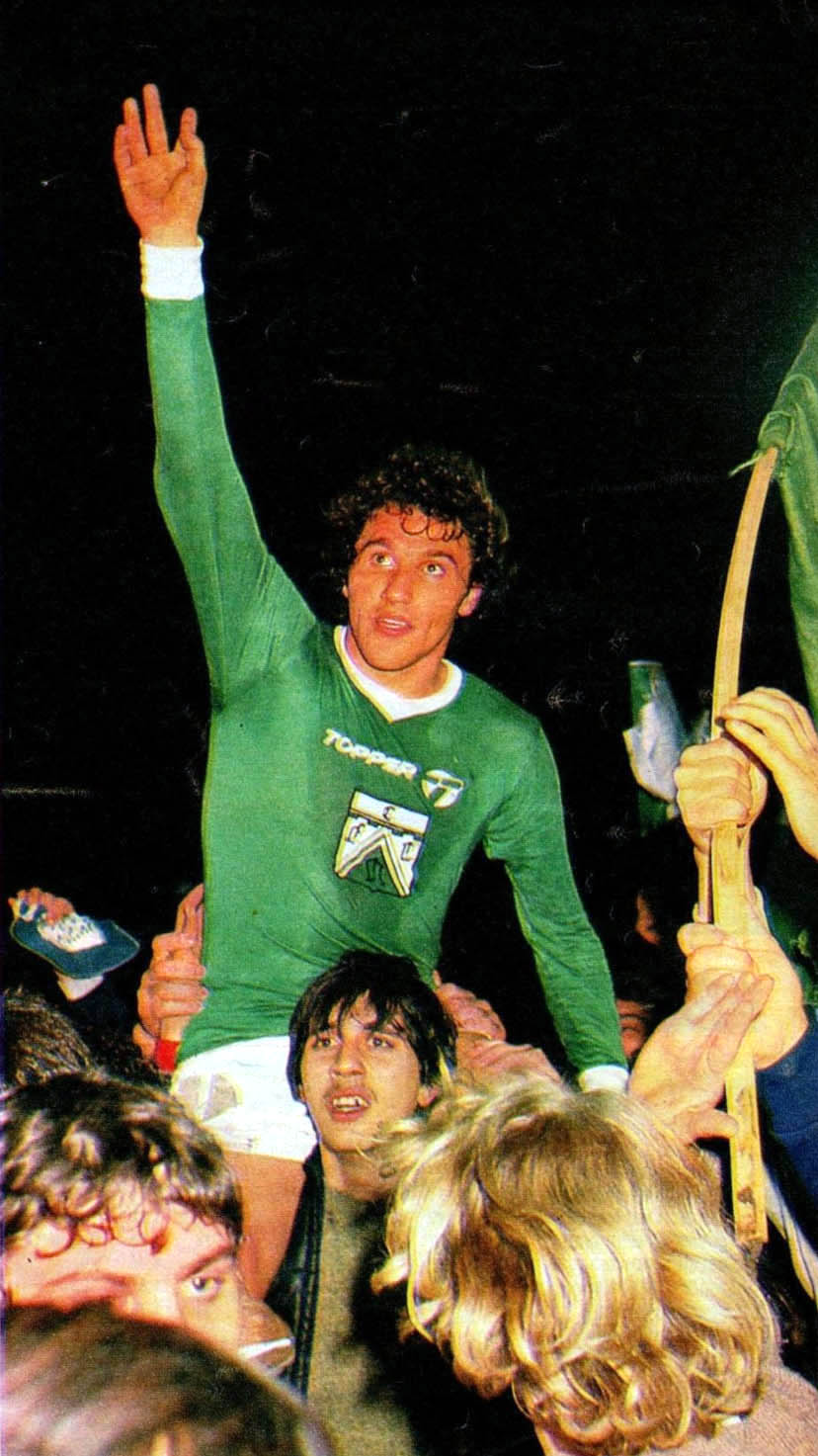
- Alberto Márcico celebrating the title with the fans
- Event: 1984 Campeonato Nacional
River Plate	Ferro Carril Oeste
0	4
- on aggregate

First leg
River Plate	Ferro Carril Oeste
0	3
- Date: 24 May 1984
- Venue: Estadio Monumental, Buenos Aires
- Referee: Arturo Ithurralde

Second leg
Ferro Carril Oeste	River Plate
0	1
- Date: 30 May 1984
- Venue: Estadio Ferro Carril Oeste, Buenos Aires
- Referee: Teodoro Nitti

The 1984 Campeonato Nacional finals were the final matches of the 1984 Campeonato Nacional, the second of the two league championships held during the 93th season of the Argentine Primera División. The two-legged event was contested between River Plate and Ferro Carril Oeste. The first leg was played at the Estadio Monumental, Buenos Aires on 24 May 1984, and the second leg was played on 30 May 1984 at the Estadio Ferro Carril Oeste, Buenos Aires.

It was the second final between both teams after the 1981 Campeonato Nacional finals won by River Plate.

Ferro Carril Oeste won the series 4–0 on goal difference to win their 2nd. title in the upper division of Argentine football.

== Background ==
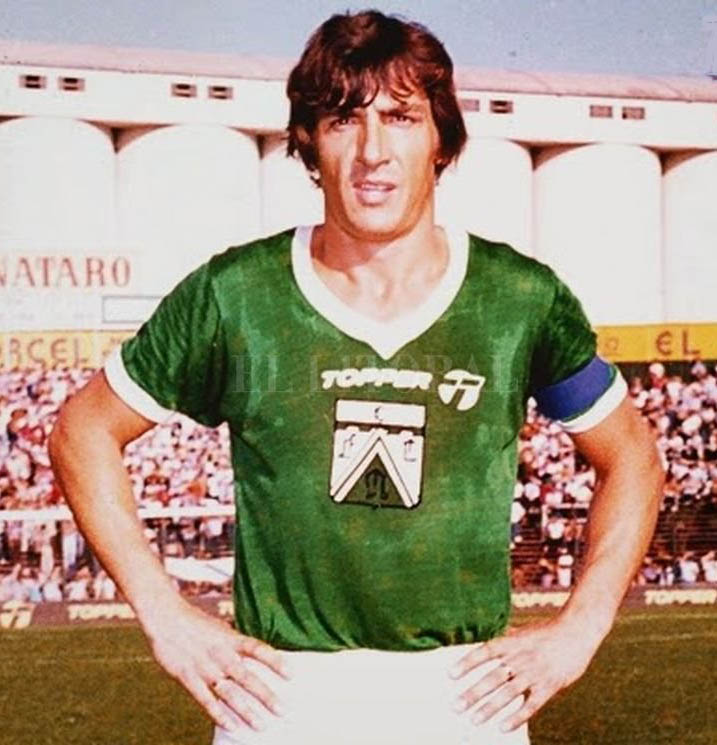
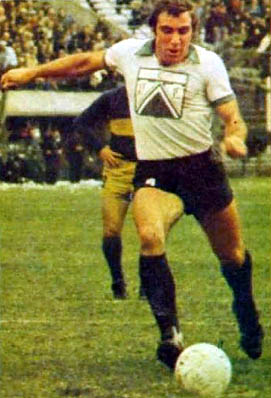
Ferro's legends Gerónimo Saccardi (left) and Juan D. Rocchia had retired from football one year before the final

Ferro Carril Oeste was in a transicional phase due to some of the key players that had made significant contributions to the team that won their first Primera División title won in 1982, such as Gerónimo Saccardi Juan Domingo Rocchia (both retired in 1983), Carlos Barisio (transferred to Boca Juniors), Claudio Crocco (traded to Chilean Club Universidad de Chile in 1984), were no longer part of the team.

Nevertheless, the emergence of new players from the youth divisions of the club such as Víctor Marchesini, Hugo Noremberg, or José Fantaguzzi, allowed manager Carlos Griguol to consolidate the team structure.

On the River Plate side, the club had hired goalkeeper Nery Pumpido after the departure of legend Ubaldo Fillol (transferred to Argentinos Juniors after receiving a call from Ángel Labruna, manager of the team by then), midfielders Enzo Francescoli (arrived in 1983) and Roque Alfaro, and forwards Alberto Bica and Enrique Villalba.

== Qualified teams ==
Team	Previous finals app.
Ferro Carril Oeste	1981 Nac
River Plate	**1932**, **1936**, 1969 Met, 1972 Nac, 1976 Nac, 1978 Nac, **1979 Met**, **1981 Nac**

- Bold: indicates winning years
- Met: Campeonato Metropolitano
- Nac: Campeonato Nacional

=== Venues ===
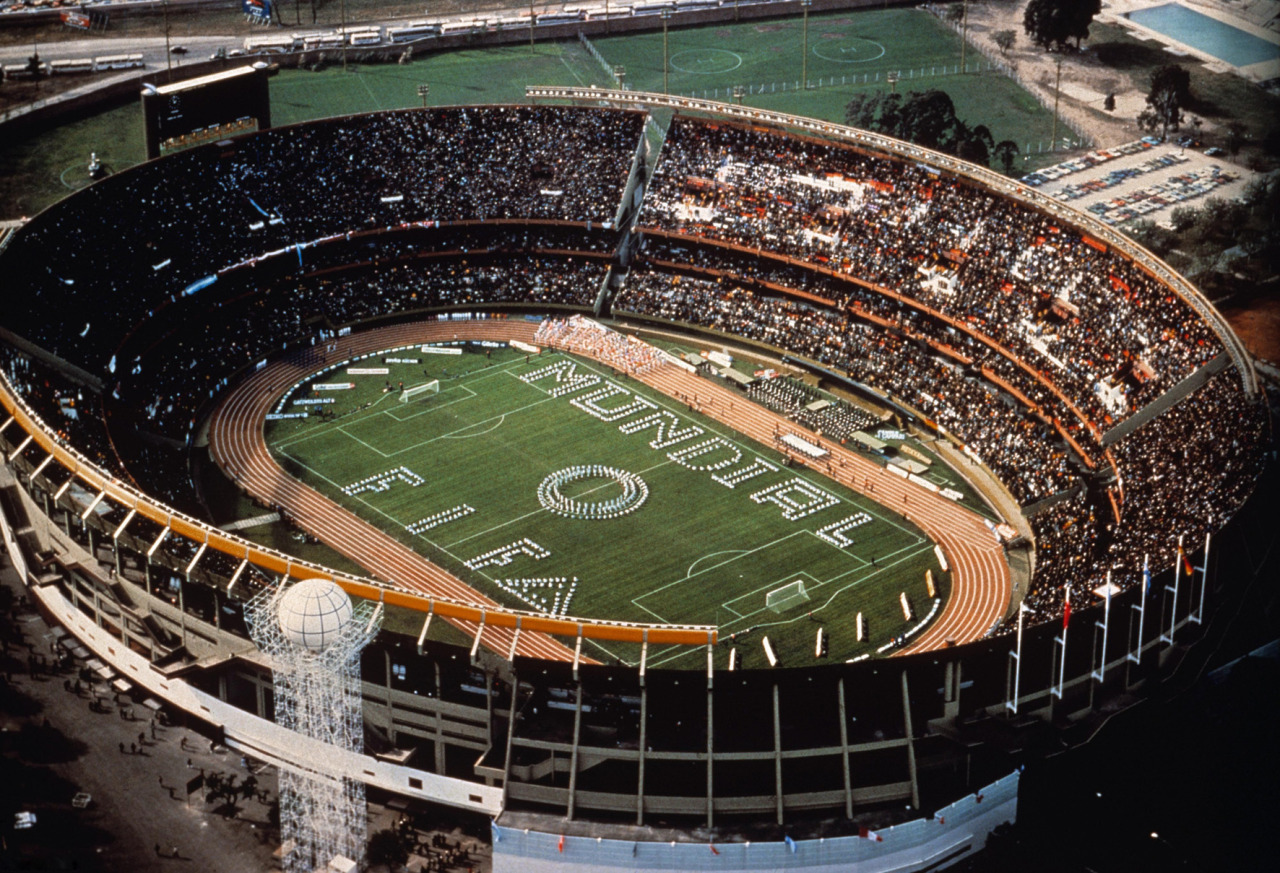
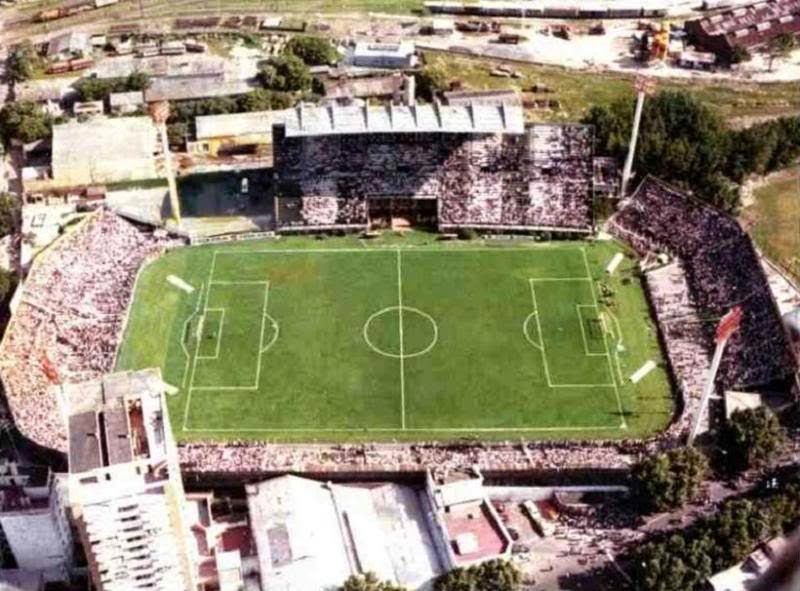
Estadio Monumental (left) and Estadio Arquitecto Ricardo Etcheverri (right), venues

== Road to the final ==
Each club needed to progress through the group stage and three knockout rounds to reach the final, playing 12 matches in total.

Ferro Carril Oeste				Round	River Plate			
Opponent	Result			Group stage	Opponent	Result		
Platense	4–1 (A)			Matchday 1	Huracán	2–0 (H)		
Altos Hornos Zapla	2–0 (H)			Matchday 2	Atlético Uruguay	5–0 (H)		
Instituto (C)	3–3 (A)			Matchday 3	Estudiantes (RC)	2–2 (A)		
Altos Hornos Zapla	1–0 (H)			Matchday 4	Atlético Uruguay	6–0 (A)		
Instituto (C)	3–3 (A)			Matchday 5	Estudiantes (RC)	3–2 (H)		
Platense	1–1 (H)			Matchday 6	Huracán	4–1 (A)		
**Group D winners**: Pos. / Team / Pts / W / T / L / Pl; 1 / Ferro Carril Oeste / 9 / 3 / 3 / 0 / 6; 2 / Instituto (C) / 7 / 2 / 3 / 1 / 6; 3 / Platense / 7 / 2 / 3 / 1 / 6; 4 / Altos Hornos Zapla / 1 / 0 / 1 / 5 / 6				Final standings	**Group E winners**: Pos. / Team / Pts / W / T / L / Pl; 1 / River Plate / 11 / 5 / 1 / 0 / 6; 2 / Huracán / 8 / 4 / 0 / 2 / 6; 3 / Estudiantes (RC) / 4 / 1 / 2 / 3 / 6; 4 / Atlético Uruguay / 1 / 0 / 1 / 5 / 6			
Opponent	Agg.	1st leg	2nd leg	Knockout stage	Opponent	Agg.	1st leg	2nd leg
Huracán	1–1 (7–6 p)	1–0 (A)	0–1 (H)	Round of 16	Instituto (C)	2–0	0–0 (A)	2–0 (H)
Independiente	2–1	1–1 (H)	1–0 (A)	Quarterfinals	Belgrano (C)	4–2	4–0 (A)	0–2 (H)
Talleres (C)	2–1	1–0 (H)	1–1 (A)	Semifinals	San Lorenzo	4–2	2–1 (A)	2–1 (H)

== Matches ==
=== First leg ===
==== Summary ====
Ferro Carril Oeste took a quick lead in the 3rd minute of the match, when Paraguayan midifielder Adolfino Cañete's header could not be stopped by goalkeeper Nery Pumpido to set the 1–0 for the visitor team. In the 30th minute, winger Hugo Noremberg dribbled Pumpido to score Ferro's second goal.

Ferro's performance was rated as "perfect" while the River Plate's was "disastrous", according to journalist Julio César Pasquatto on sports magazine El Gráfico. The journalist emphasized the team's skill, tactical discipline, perseverance, and ability to capitalize on the opponent's mistakes, were the main virtues of Ferro Carril Oeste. On the other hand, River Plate's performance was described as "disastrous".

Focusing on individual performances, in the case of River Plate, Pasquatto rated Enzo Francescoli's and Roque Alfaro's as very poor considering they were key figures of the team along with Norberto Alonso, who struggled against not only opposing defenders but his teammates.

Regarding Ferro C.O., the journalist praised the performances of Cañete and Alberto Márcico, remarking that the best plays originated from the feet of both players. Goalkeeper Eduardo Bacigalup was also highlighted as one of the team's best players, with some key saves.

When the ball is in the opponent's possession, Ferro's performance holds no surprises, yet it still manages to be astonishing. It's as if their players are multiplying. Their staggered formation, without man-marking but consistently occupying their zone with close cover, is admirable. So much so that in the last 55 minutes of the first leg and the 70 minutes of the second, when River tried to build attacks and launch them, we had the feeling that they couldn't create any scoring danger even if they played three days in a row. Their defensive screens, the functioning of their 'small partnerships,' the orderly multiplicity with which everyone reveals everyone else, might seem like routine.

— El Gráfico journalist Julio C. Pasquato about FCO

==== Details ====
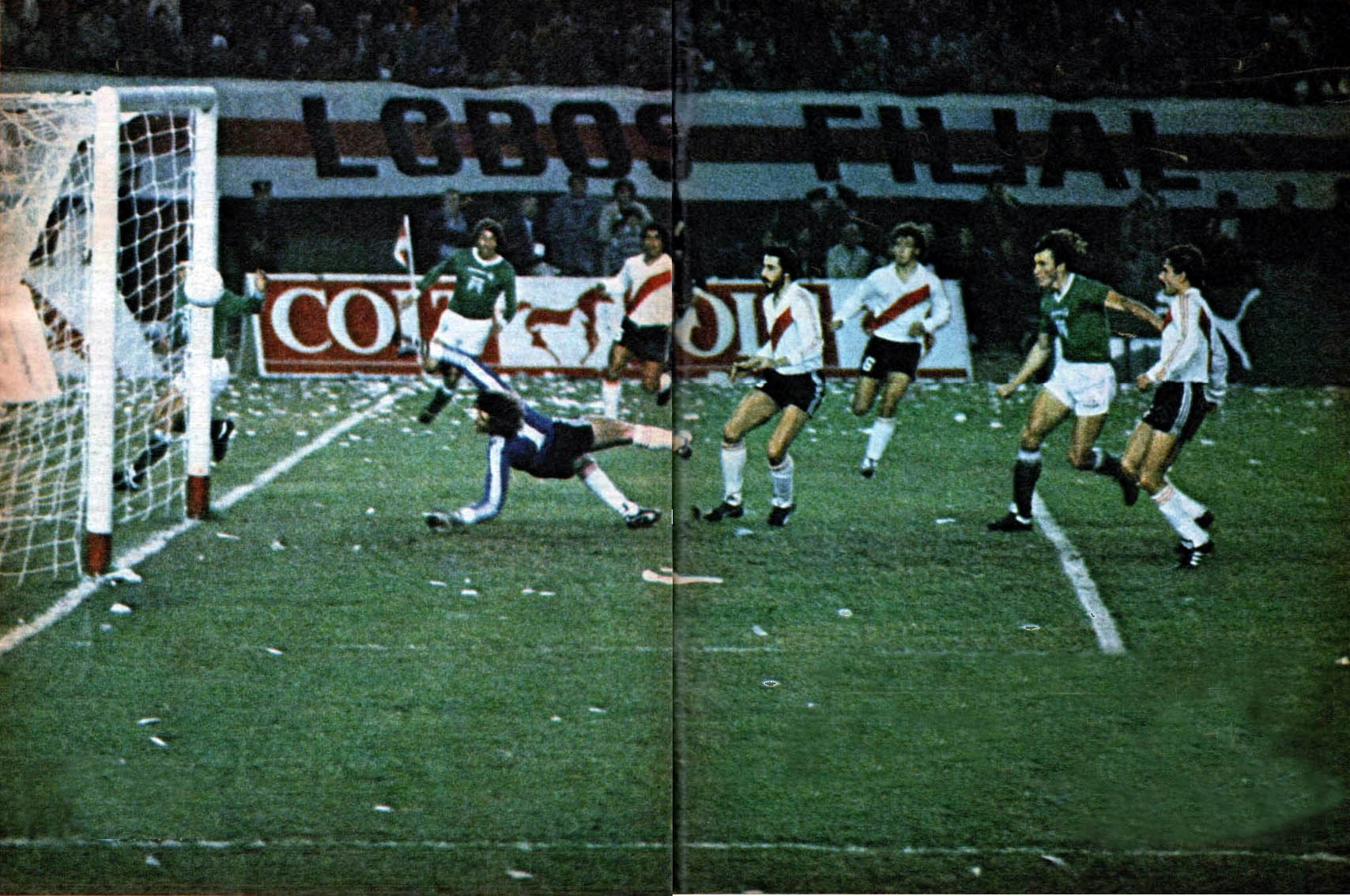
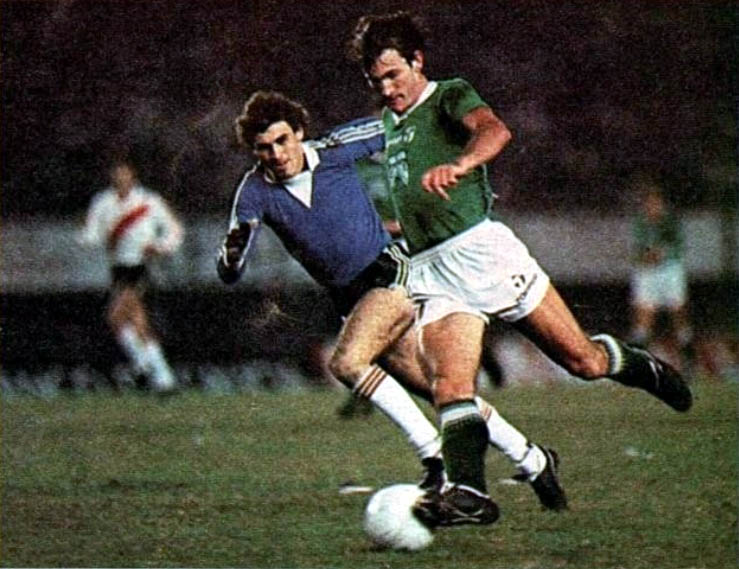
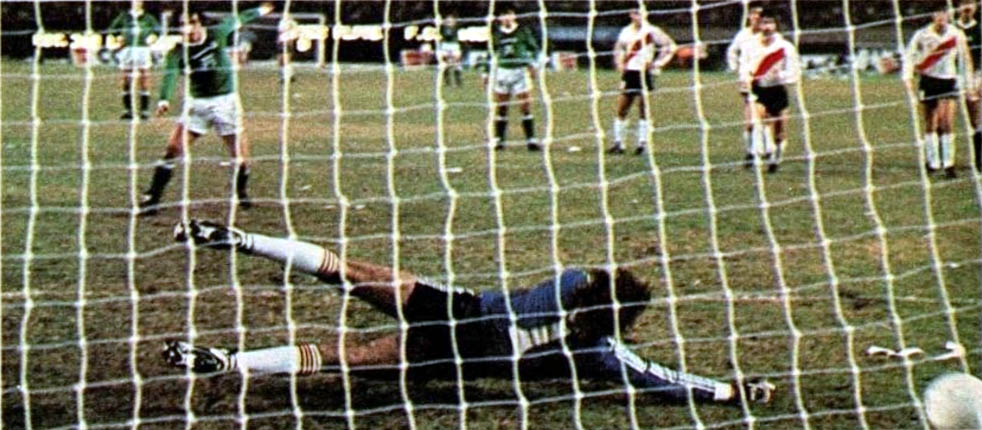
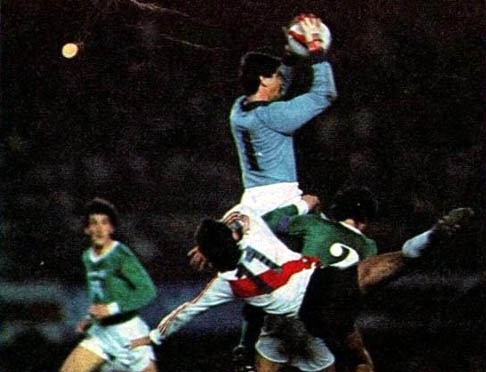
Some moments of the first leg at Estadio Monumental, fltr: the Ferro C.O. goals, in order (photos 1–3); Eduardo Bacigalup catching the ball (4)
1984 Torneo Nacional Final
24 May 1984
First leg

River Plate	0–3	Ferro Carril Oeste
	Report	Cañete 3'; Noremberg 20'; Márcico 35' (pen.)

Estadio Monumental, Buenos Aires
Referee: Arturo Ithurralde

**River Plate**	**Ferro Carril Oeste**

GK	1	(Argentina) Nery Pumpido
DF	4	(Argentina) Eduardo Saporiti
DF	2	(Uruguay) Alfredo de los Santos
DF	6	(Argentina) Jorge Borelli
DF	3	(Argentina) Jorge García
MF	8	(Argentina) Enzo Francescoli
MF	5	(Argentina) Américo Gallego	(substituted off) 45'
MF	11	(Argentina) Roque Alfaro
MF	10	(Argentina) Norberto Alonso
FW	7	(Uruguay) Alberto Bica	(substituted off) 63'
FW	9	(Paraguay) Enrique Villalba
Substitutes:
FW		(Argentina) Daniel Teglia	(substituted on) 45'
MF		(Argentina) Carlos Tapia	(substituted on) 63'
GK		(Argentina) Carlos Gay
DF		(Argentina) Carlos Karabin
DF		(Argentina) Julio Olarticoechea
Manager:
(Uruguay) Luis Cubilla

GK	1	(Argentina) Eduardo Basigalup
DF	4	(Argentina) Oscar Agonil
DF	2	(Argentina) Héctor Cúper
DF	6	(Argentina) Víctor Marchesini
DF	3	(Argentina) Oscar Garré
MF	8	(Argentina) Carlos Arregui
MF	5	(Argentina) Jorge Brandoni
MF	10	(Paraguay) Adolfino Cañete
FW	7	(Argentina) Hugo Noremberg	(substituted off) 22'
FW	9	(Argentina) Alberto Márcico
FW	11	(Argentina) Roberto Gargini	(substituted off) 57'
Substitutes:
MF		(Argentina) Daniel Fernández	(substituted on) 22'
MF		(Argentina) José Fantaguzzi	(substituted on) 57'
GK		(Argentina) Ricardo Ferrero
DF		(Argentina) José L. Carrizo
MF		(Argentina) Oscar R. Acosta
Manager:
(Argentina) Carlos Griguol

=== Second leg ===
==== Summary ====
Ferro quickly opened the scoring when midfielder Adolfino Cañete headed the ball after a pass from the right by Carlos Arregui in the 2nd. minute of game. The match was suspended due to incidents caused by River Plate fans, who arsoned a stand of the stadium (which were of wood by then) located on calle Martín de Gainza side (East). Ferro Carril Oeste estimated losses of AR$ 300,000, which River Plate committed to pay. Damages included three wooden planks, and a turnstile.

After the match concluded, River Plate players and staff were attacked by a group of Ferro's barras with a help from Argentinos Juniors' violent supporters. Norberto Alonso had been previously attacked on the pitch immediately after Nitti ended the match. The federal police arrested 40 fans, of which 17 were underage.

==== Details ====
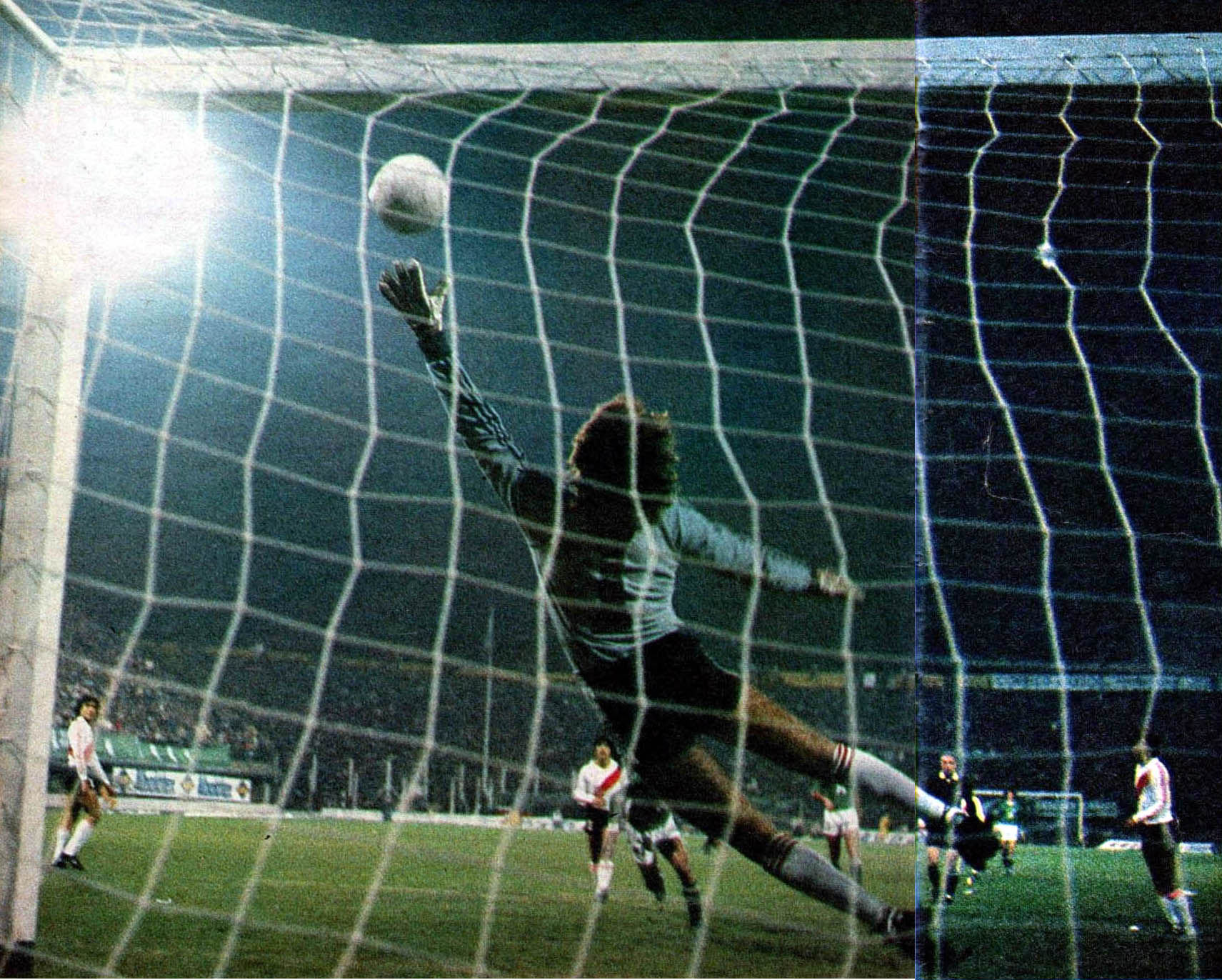
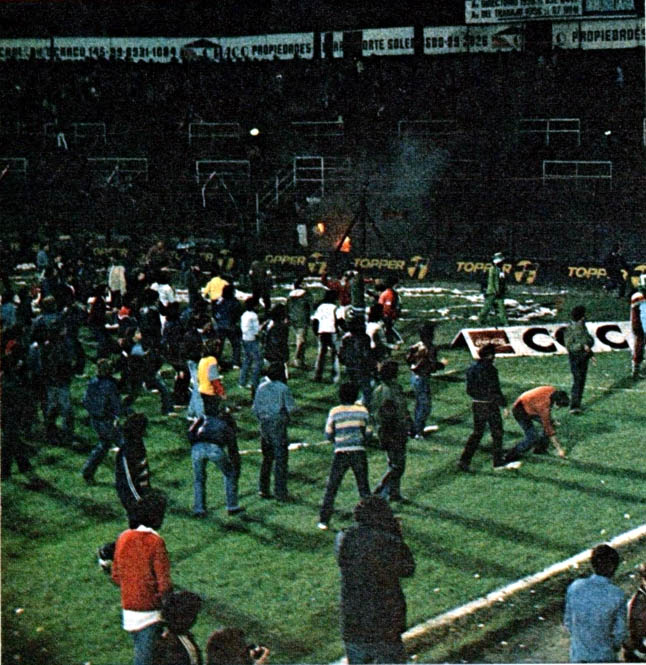
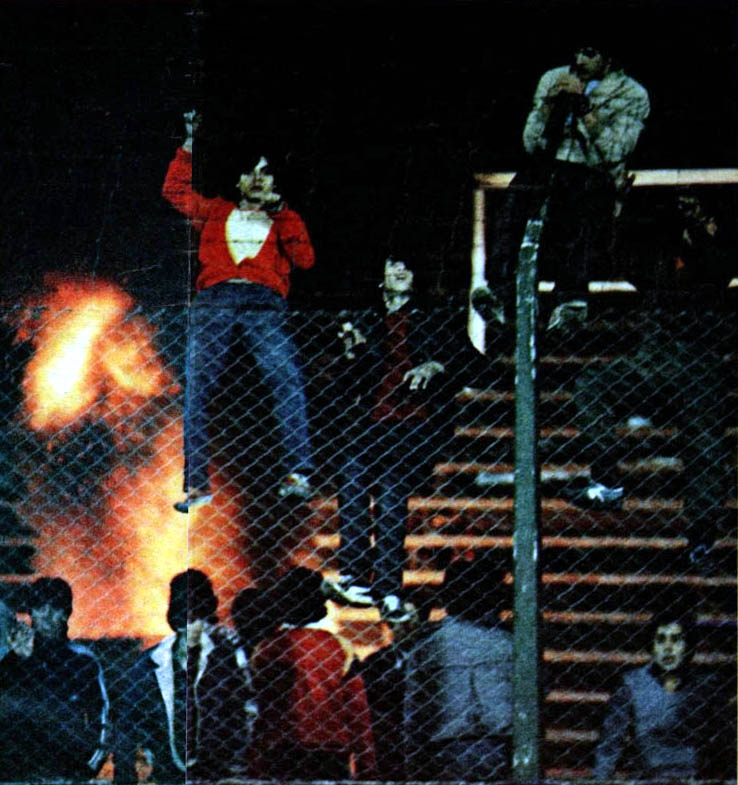
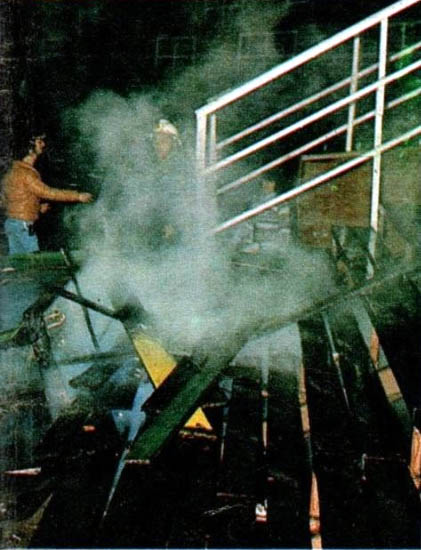
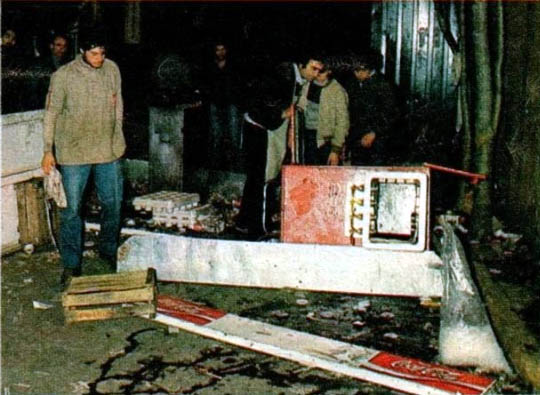
The only goal of the match scored by Adolfino Cañete (left); the incidents at Ferro C. Oeste stadium that forced referee Teodoro Nitti to suspend the match
30 May 1984
Second leg

Ferro Carril Oeste	1–0	River Plate
Cañete 2'	Report

Estadio Ferro Carril Oeste, Buenos Aires
Attendance: 23,650
Referee: Teodoro Nitti

**Ferro Carril Oeste**
**River Plate**

GK	1	(Argentina) Eduardo Basigalup
DF	4	(Argentina) Oscar Agonil
DF	2	(Argentina) Héctor Cúper
DF	6	(Argentina) Víctor Marchesini
DF	3	(Argentina) Oscar Garré
MF	8	(Argentina) Carlos Arregui
MF	5	(Argentina) Jorge Brandoni
MF	10	(Paraguay) Adolfino Cañete
FW	7	(Argentina) Mario Noremberg
FW	9	(Argentina) Alberto Márcico
FW	11	(Argentina) Roberto Gargini
Manager:
(Argentina) Carlos Griguol

GK	1	(Argentina) Nery Pumpido
DF	4	(Argentina) Eduardo Saporiti
DF	2	(Uruguay) Alfredo de los Santos
DF	6	(Argentina) Jorge Borelli
DF	3	(Argentina) Jorge García
MF	8	(Uruguay) Enzo Francescoli
MF	5	(Argentina) Julio Olarticoechea
MF	10	(Argentina) Norberto Alonso
MF		(Argentina) Héctor Enrique	(substituted off) 45'
FW		(Paraguay) Enrique Villalba	(substituted off) 45'
FW		(Argentina) Daniel Teglia
Substitutes:
FW		(Uruguay) Alberto Bica	(substituted on) 45'
MF		(Argentina) Roque Alfaro	(substituted on) 45'
Manager:
(Uruguay) Luis Cubilla

Suspended at 70th minute

== Aftermath ==
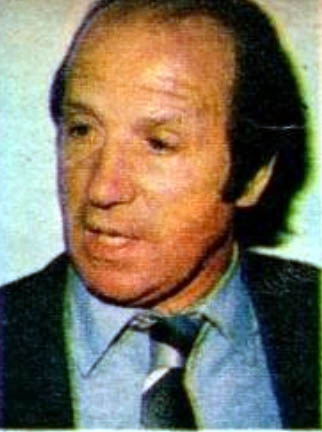
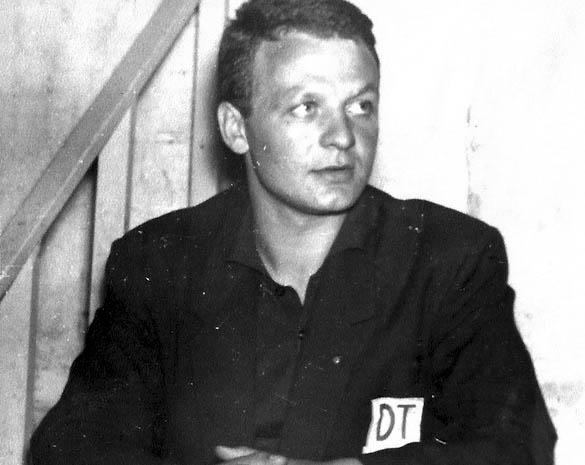
Ferro Carril Oeste manager Carlos Griguol (left) took some tactical concepts from basketball, applying to his football system. He and basketball coach José Najnudel (right) worked side-on-side analysing videos of games from both sports

Ferro Carril Oeste consolidated the style imposed by Griguol, based on (according to his own words): order, respect, and discipline. He had been serving in the club since 1980, when the executive committee leaded by Santiago Leyden and Ricardo Etcheverry contacted Griguol after a suggestion from basketball coach León Najnudel (considered "the father" of Liga Nacional de Básquet and Ferro C. Oeste basketball coach by then). Griguol himself stated that Ferro had hired him to avoid Ferro to be relegated to the second division.

Najnudel exchanged tactical concepts from basketball with Griguol to incorporate into football, such as pick and roll, which Griguol eventually used, particularly to gain an advantage on corner kicks to free up headers. Najnudel filmed the football matches and Griguol the basketball games, and then they analyzed each play to improve their teams' performance.

Ferro is the National Champion, but that doesn't mean Ferro is the truth about football, nor that I have the magic formula. There are no magicians in football."

— Carlos Griguol about his team and the 1984 Nacional championship won.

I met León (Najnudel) through Timoteo (Griguol). He was a huge fan of what he did. We discussed both sports. He showed us how to gain position on the field using our bodies in screens and how to train for them. He helped us with those things that could be incorporated into football. He and Timoteo were two visionaries

— Carlos Aimar, Griguol's assistant coach

== Bibliography ==
- El Gráfico editions:
    1. 3373, 29 May 1984
    2. 3374, 5 June 1984
