= Nelson Gutiérrez =

Uruguayan footballer (born 1962)

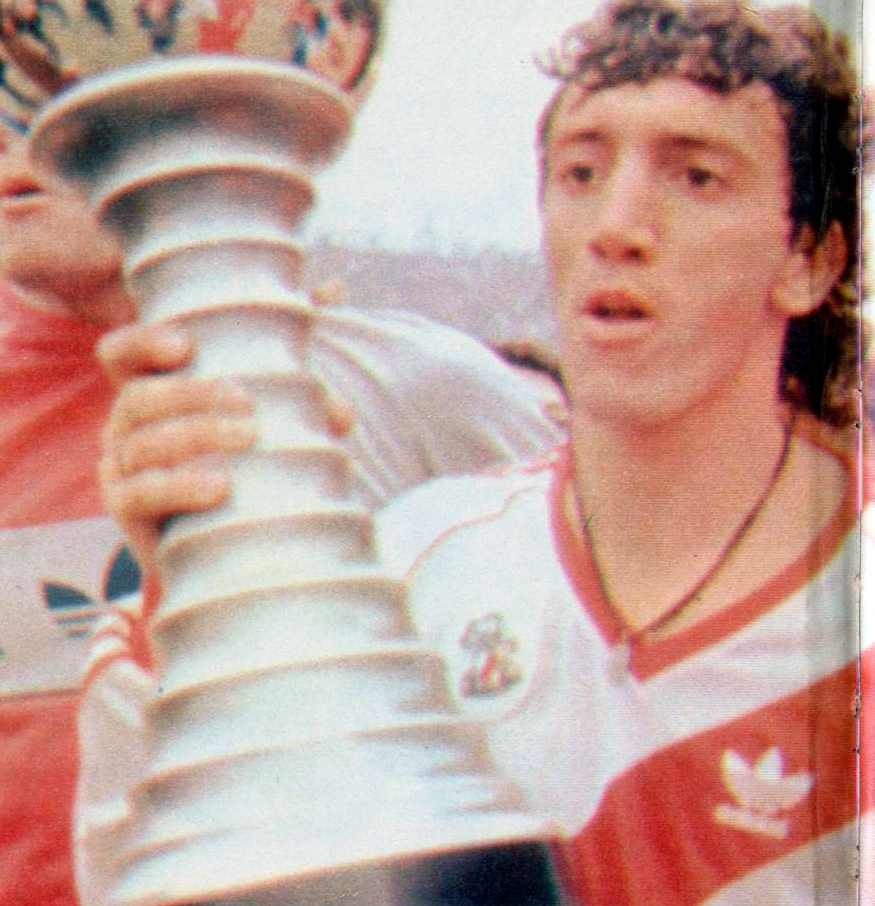
- Gutiérrez after winning the Intercontinental Cup

Personal information
- Full name: Nelson Daniel Gutiérrez Luongo
- Date of birth: 13 April 1962 (age 64)
- Place of birth: Montevideo, Uruguay
- Height: 1.82 m (5 ft 11 1/2 in)
- Position: Defender

Senior career*
Years	Team	Apps	(Gls)
1981–1985	Peñarol	104	(3)
1985	Atlético Nacional	26	
1986–1988	River Plate	68	(3)
1988–1989	SS Lazio	17	(1)
1989–1991	Hellas Verona	27	(3)
1991–1993	Logroñés	60	(1)
1993–1996	Peñarol		
1997	Defensor		

International career
1983–1990	Uruguay	57	(0)
Medal record
Representing Uruguay
Copa América
Winner	1983
Winner	1987 Argentina
Runner-up	1989 Brazil
CONMEBOL–UEFA Cup of Champions
Runner-up	1985 France
- * Club domestic league appearances and goals

Nelson Daniel Gutiérrez Luongo (born 13 April 1962) is a Uruguayan former footballer who played as a defender. He won 57 international caps for the Uruguay national football team, and was a member of the team that competed at the 1986 and 1990 FIFA World Cups.

== Biography ==
Gutiérrez started his playing career in 1980 with Peñarol. He was part of the squad that won the league championships in 1981 and 1982.

1982 also saw Peñarol win the Copa Libertadores and the Copa Intercontinental against Aston Villa F.C. in England.

In 1985 Gutiérrez joined Atlético Nacional in Colombia, but he didn't settle there and soon joined River Plate in Argentina.

Gutiérrez helped River win the Argentine Primera in 1985–86 and was part of the squad that won the club's first Copa Libertadores title in 1986. They also won the Copa Intercontinental and the Copa Interamericana during his time with the club.

In the late 1980s he moved to Italy where he played for Lazio and then Hellas Verona. Between 1991 and 1993 he played in Spain for Logroñés before returning to Uruguay.

Gutiérrez returned to Peñarol in 1993 and helped the club win the Uruguayan championship in 1993, 1994, 1995 and 1996. He finished his playing career with Defensor Sporting Club in 1997.

== Honours ==
=== Peñarol ===
- Uruguayan First Division (6): 1981, 1982, 1993, 1994, 1995, 1996
- Copa Libertadores (1): 1982
- Intercontinental Cup (1): 1982

=== River Plate ===
- Argentine First Division (1): 1985-86
- Copa Libertadores (1): 1986
- Intercontinental Cup (1): 1986
- Copa Interamericana (1): 1986

=== Uruguay ===
- Copa América: 1983, 1987; runner-up: 1989

=== Individual ===
- South American Team of The Year: 1986, 1987
