= Rodrigo Rivera =

Rodrigo Rivera may refer to:

- Rodrigo Rivera Salazar (born 1963), Colombian politician
- Rodrigo Rivera (footballer, born 1983), Chilean football centre-back
- Rodrigo Rivera (footballer, born 1993), Salvadoran football midfielder

== See also ==
- Rodrigo Riera (1923–1999), Venezuelan guitarist and composer
- Rodrigo Rivero (born 1995), Uruguayan football winger
