= Claudio Borghi (footballer) =

Argentine footballer and manager

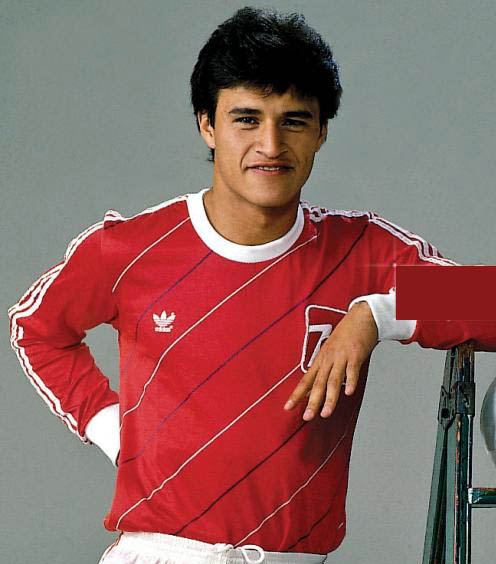
- Borghi in 1985, when he raised as a youth star from Argentinos Juniors

Personal information
- Full name: Claudio Daniel Borghi Bidos
- Date of birth: 28 September 1964 (age 62)
- Place of birth: Castelar, Argentina
- Height: 1.81 m (5 ft 11 in)
- Position: Attacking midfielder

Senior career*
Years	Team	Apps	(Gls)
1981–1987	Argentinos Juniors	39	(8)
1987–1988	Milan	0	(0)
1987	→ Como (loan)	7	(0)
1988	Neuchâtel Xamax	?	(?)
1988–1989	River Plate	21	(1)
1989	Flamengo	6	(0)
1990	Independiente	12	(1)
1990–1991	Unión de Santa Fe	7	(1)
1991	Huracán	22	(1)
1992	Colo-Colo	18	(5)
1992–1993	Platense	12	(0)
1994	Correcaminos UAT	10	(0)
1995	O'Higgins	22	(4)
1996	Audax Italiano	20	(6)
1998	Santiago Wanderers	6	(0)
Total		238	(34)

International career
1985–1986	Argentina	9	(0)

Managerial career
- 2001: Colo-Colo (assistant)
- 2002–2003: Audax Italiano
- 2006–2008: Colo-Colo
- 2008: Independiente
- 2009–2010: Argentinos Juniors
- 2010: Boca Juniors
- 2011–2012: Chile
- 2014: Argentinos Juniors
- 2016: LDU Quito
Medal record
Men's football
Representing Argentina
FIFA World Cup
Winner	1986 Mexico
- * Club domestic league appearances and goals

Claudio Daniel Borghi Bidos (Spanish pronunciation: [ˈklawðjo ˈβoɾɣi]; born 28 September 1964), nicknamed Bichi, is an Argentine and Chilean football manager and former player who played as an attacking midfielder.

He has been active as a player and coach mostly in Argentina and Chile, and also played in Italy, Switzerland, Brazil and Mexico; and coached in Ecuador.

== Career ==
=== Club career ===
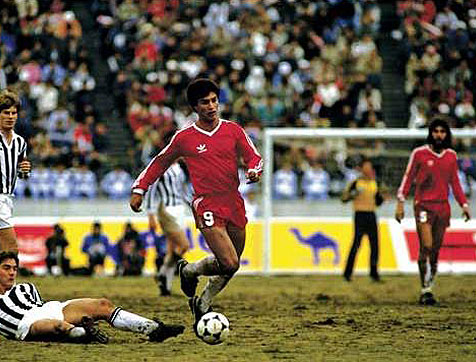
Borghi during the 1985 Intercontinental Cup match vs. Juventus

Borghi started his career as an attacking midfielder for Argentinos Juniors in the early 1980s. He was considered a bright young star for Argentina and tipped by many to match Diego Maradona's level.

Borghi's exceptional performance in the 1985 Intercontinental Cup final (Argentinos Juniors lost to Juventus on penalties) drew the attention of AC Milan president Silvio Berlusconi, and Borghi was signed for the club in 1987. Borghi was drafted in alongside Dutchmen Marco van Basten and Ruud Gullit, but, since teams were allowed only two foreign players, he was loaned out to Como for the 1987–88 season. The next year the maximum number of foreign players was increased to three, but Milan coach Arrigo Sacchi – who had won respect by securing the Scudetto a few months earlier – asked his team to sign another Dutch player, Frank Rijkaard, instead of bringing Borghi back, as Berlusconi wished. Afterwards Borghi left Italy and tried his luck in Switzerland with Neuchâtel Xamax, before returning to South America where he played for River Plate, Flamengo and Independiente. Eventually he wound up in Chile, winning the Recopa Sudamericana and Copa Interamericana with Colo-Colo in 1992, and concluded his playing career with Santiago Wanderers in 1999.

=== International career ===
Borghi was called up to the Argentina national team for the 1986 FIFA World Cup in Mexico, where he won the World Cup with Argentina and played in two group matches alongside Diego Maradona at his peak.

=== Managerial career ===
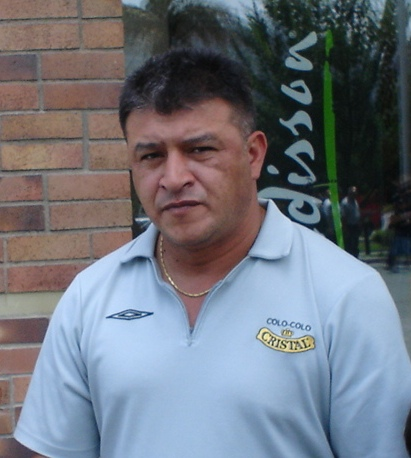
Borghi in 2006, as manager of Chilean club Colo Colo

After retiring as a player, Borghi started a career as a manager in Chile, between 2004 and 2005 he worked as the coach of Audax Italiano.

In 2006 Borghi was appointed as the coach of Colo-Colo. He led the team to four consecutive league championships between 2006 and 2007. He also led the club to the final of the 2006 Copa Sudamericana and received the South American Coach of the Year award in 2006.

In June 2008, Borghi returned to Argentina to become the 19th coach of Independiente in the last 10 years. Borghi was unable to accomplish a winning campaign and resigned from the position on 5 October 2008 following, a 1–0 loss to Huracán. While at Independiente, Borghi managed the team for 17 matches, winning 4, drawing 9, and losing 4.

In June 2009, he returned to Argentinos Juniors as their new manager following their dismal 2009 Clausura campaign, which had seen the club finish 20th (last) in the table, with only 2 wins from their 19 games.

After leading the club to a 6th-place finish in the 2009 Apertura championship, Borghi and the Argentinos Juniors directors set the target of surpassing the 61 points from the 2007–08 season to avoid dropping further down the relegation table.

In the 2010 Clausura championship, Argentinos recorded a 6–3 win against Lanús in their second fixture of the campaign, but after five games this was their only win, with two draws and two defeats. Subsequently, Argentinos won their 6th fixture against Estudiantes de La Plata, which was the start of a 14-game unbeaten streak that saw Argentinos finish 1 point ahead of Estudiantes at the end of the season. The most significant result in this 14-game run was in their penultimate fixture against title challengers Independiente, which saw Argentinos come back from 1–3 down to win 4–3, which featured two goals in the final minutes of the game to seal the win and leave Argentinos top of the table with one game to play. They sealed their first domestic championship in 25 years with a 1–2 away win against Huracán in the Estadio Tomás Adolfo Ducó.

This championship was Borghi's fifth title with the club, considering the four he had won as a player in the mid-1980s. Borghi achieved a great turnaround in the fortunes of the team that had finished in last place only one year previously and the successful Clausura championship campaign secured qualification for the 2010 Copa Sudamericana and the 2011 Copa Libertadores. However, he decided to leave Argentinos at the end of the tournament.

On 21 May 2010 Boca Juniors signed Borghi as their new head coach. His period in Boca was short however, as he resigned on 17 November, after obtaining 17 points over 42 possible in his 14 official games. His departure was subsequent to a 0–1 defeat to River Plate in the 2010 Apertura's Superclásico, that left Boca in the 15th league table position.

On 24 February 2011, he was presented by the Chilean Football Federation as the new coach, in replacement of Marcelo Bielsa, under a contract of US$1.5 Million per year until the end of the 2014 FIFA World Cup playoffs, to be extended automatically in case of qualification.

On 14 November 2012, Borghi was sacked after poor performances, including five straight losses, three in the World Cup qualifiers, and two in international friendlies.

==== Managerial statistics with Chile ====
Team	Nat	From	To	Record							
Team	Nat	From	To	G	W	D	L	Win %	GF	GA	+/-
Chile	(Chile)	24 February 2011	14 November 2012	27	11	5	11	46.9	40	40	0

== Personal life ==
His son, Filippo Borghi Pagnuco, was with the Unión Española youth ranks as a striker, but he switched to the rugby union when he was a student of Redland School, representing Chile at international tournaments.

== Other works ==
Borghi spent over six years with TNT Sports Chile (before Canal del Fútbol) as a football commentator between 2019 and 2025. In March 2025, he switched to ESPN Chile. In March 2026, he moved back to TNT Sports Chile.

In March 2025, Borghi assumed as an adviser for Argentinos Juniors.

In February 2026, Claudio and his son, Filippo, joined the sports streaming media Picado TV Chile.

== Honours ==
=== Player ===
==== Club ====
Argentinos Juniors

- Primera División Argentina (2): 1984, 1985
- Copa Libertadores: 1985
- Copa Interamericana: 1985
- Intercontinental Cup runner-up: 1985

Colo-Colo

- Copa Interamericana: 1992
- Recopa Sudamericana: 1992
- Chilean Primera División runner-up: 1992
- Copa Chile runner-up: 1992

==== International ====
Argentina

- FIFA World Cup: 1986

=== Manager ===
==== Club ====
Colo-Colo

- Torneo Apertura (2): 2006, 2007
- Torneo Clausura (2): 2006, 2007.

Argentinos Juniors

- Torneo Clausura: 2010

=== Individual ===
==== Manager ====
- South American Coach of the Year: 2006
