= 1980 Copa Libertadores finals =

1980 Copa Libertadores de América finals
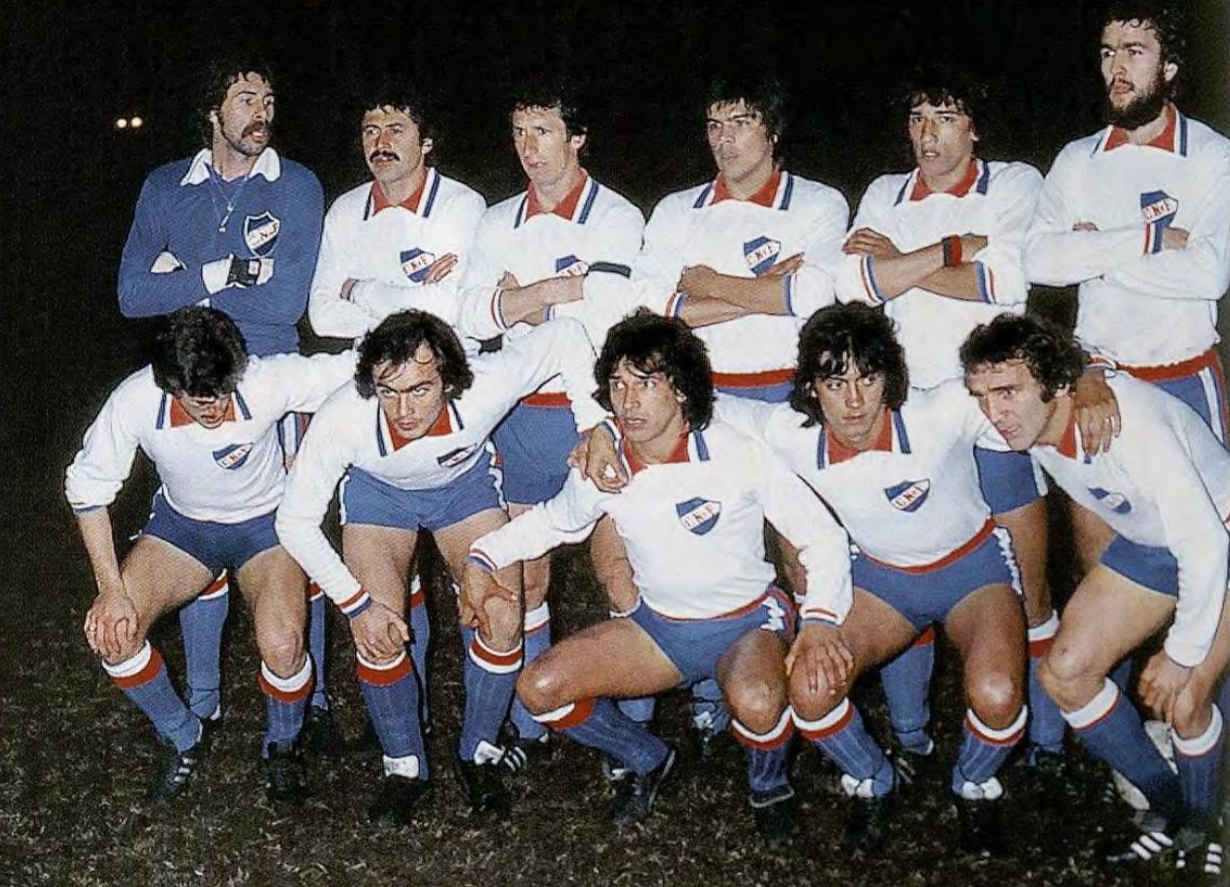
- Nacional, champions
- Event: 1980 Copa Libertadores
Internacional	Nacional
(Brazil)	(Uruguay)
0	1

First leg
Internacional	Nacional
0	0
- Date: 30 July 1980
- Venue: Beira-Rio, Porto Alegre
- Attendance: 70,000

Second leg
Nacional	Internacional
1	0
- Date: 6 August 1980
- Venue: Centenario, Montevideo
- Attendance: 65,000

The 1980 Copa Libertadores de América finals was the final two-legged tie to determine the Copa Libertadores de América champion. It was contested by Uruguayan club Nacional and Brazilian club Internacional. The first leg of the tie was played on 30 July at Estádio Beira-Rio of Porto Alegre, with the second leg played on 6 August at Estadio Centenario in Montevideo.

For the first time in 18 years, a club from Argentina did not play in the Copa Libertadores final.

With the first game tied 0–0, Nacional were crowned champion after winning the second leg 1–0 with a goal by striker Waldemar Victorino, achieving their second Copa Libertadores title. Victorino was also the top scorer of the edition with 6 goals.

The second leg of the finals was Paulo Roberto Falcão's last match as a player for Internacional.

== Format ==
The finals was played over two legs; home and away. The team that accumulated the most points —two for a win, one for a draw, zero for a loss— after the two legs was crowned champion. If the two teams were tied on points after the second leg, a playoff in a neutral would become the next tie-breaker. Goal difference was used as a last resort.

== Qualified teams ==
Team	Previous finals app.
(Brazil) Internacional	None
(Uruguay) Nacional	4 (1964, 1967, 1969, 1971)

== Venues ==
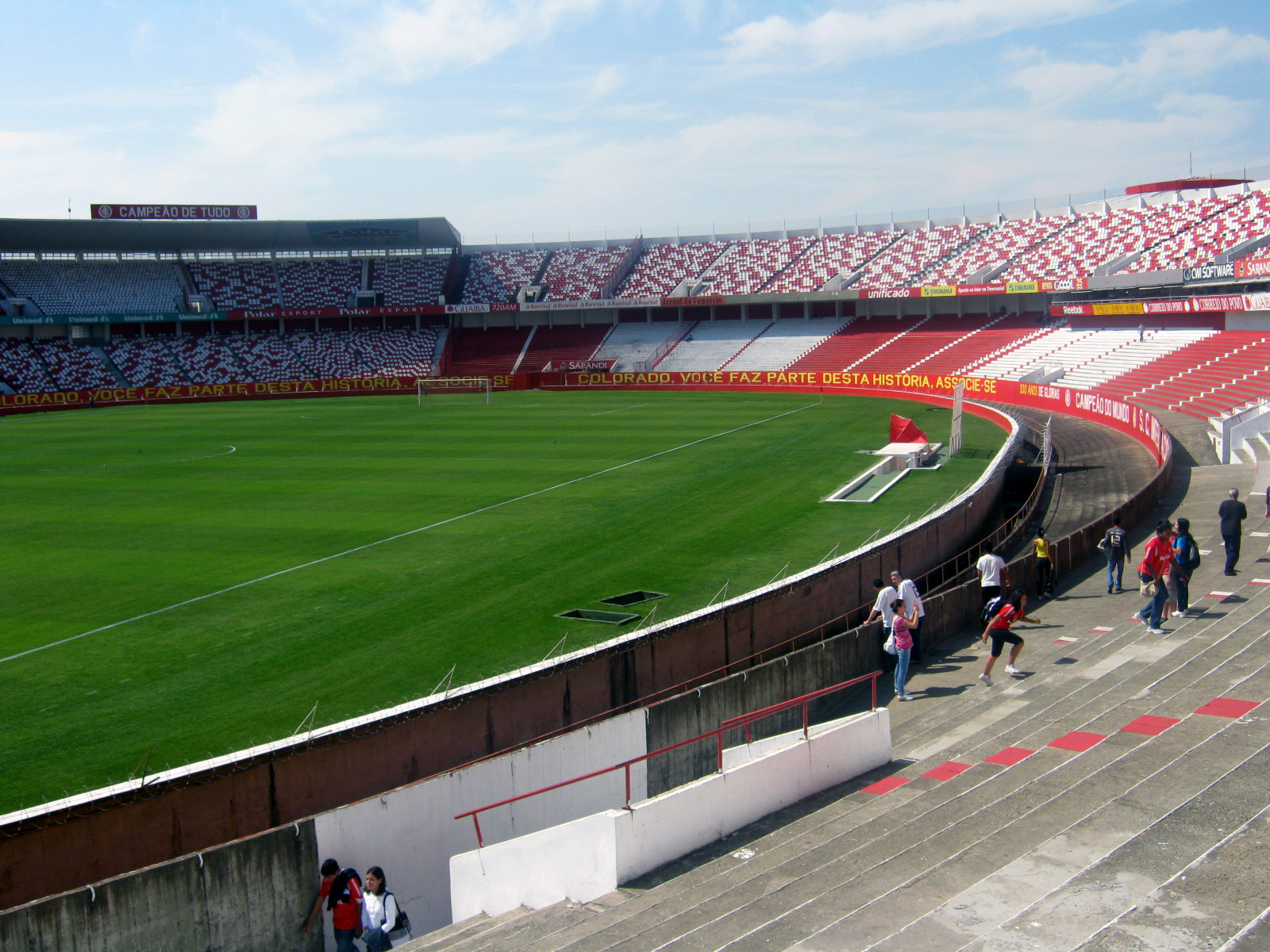
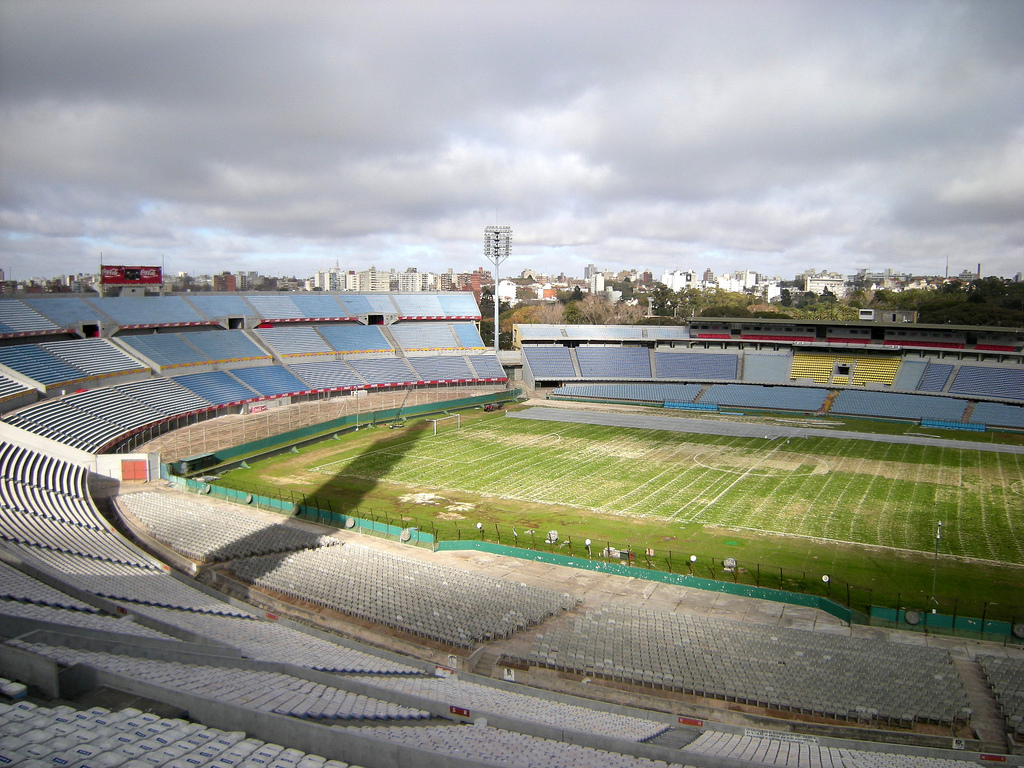
Estádio Beira-Rio (left) and Estadio Centenario, venues for the series

== Match details ==
=== First leg ===
1980 Copa Libertadores finals
30 July 1980
First leg

Internacional (Brazil)	0–0	(Uruguay) Nacional
	Report

Estadio Beira-Rio, Porto Alegre
Attendance: 70,000
Referee: Jorge Romero (Argentina)

Internacional	Nacional

GK	1	(Brazil) Gasperin
DF	2	(Brazil) Toninho
DF	3	(Brazil) Mauro Pastor (c)
DF	4	(Brazil) Mauro Galvão
DF	6	(Brazil) André Luís
MF	5	(Brazil) Falcão
MF	8	(Brazil) Batista
MF	10	(Brazil) Jair
FW	7	(Brazil) Chico Spina	Substituted off
FW	9	(Brazil) Tonho
FW	11	(Brazil) Mário Sérgio
Substitutes:
FW		(Brazil) Adavílson	Substituted on
Manager:
(Brazil) Ênio Andrade

GK	1	(Uruguay) Rodolfo Rodríguez
DF	4	(Uruguay) José H. Moreira
DF	2	(Uruguay) Juan Carlos Blanco (c)
DF	3	(Uruguay) Hugo De León
DF	6	(Uruguay) Washington González
MF	5	(Uruguay) Víctor Espárrago
MF	8	(Uruguay) Eduardo de la Peña
MF	10	(Uruguay) Arsenio Luzardo
FW	7	(Uruguay) Alberto Bica
FW	9	(Uruguay) Waldemar Victorino
FW	11	(Uruguay) Dardo Pérez
Substitutes:
Manager:
(Uruguay) Juan Mujica

=== Second leg ===
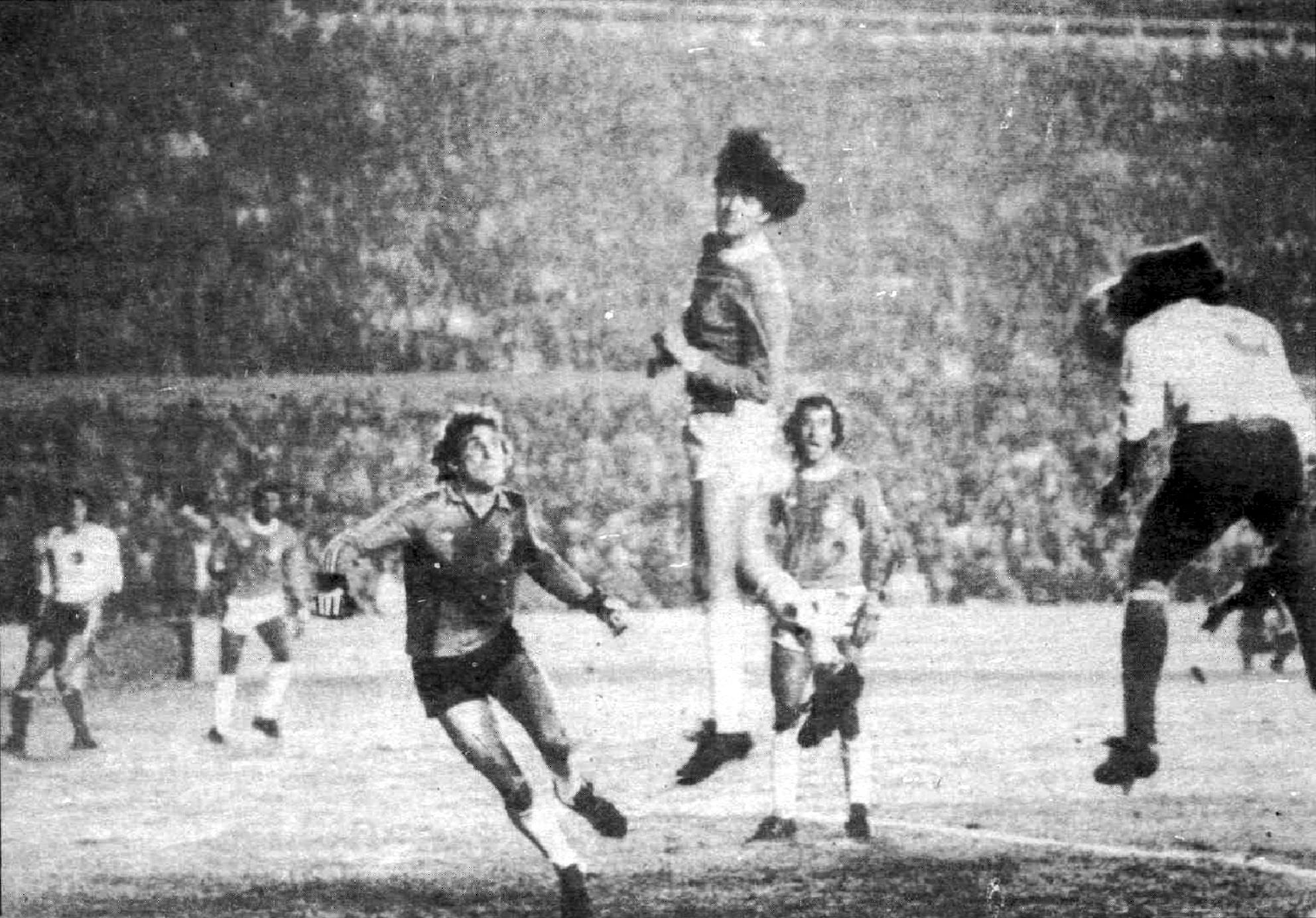
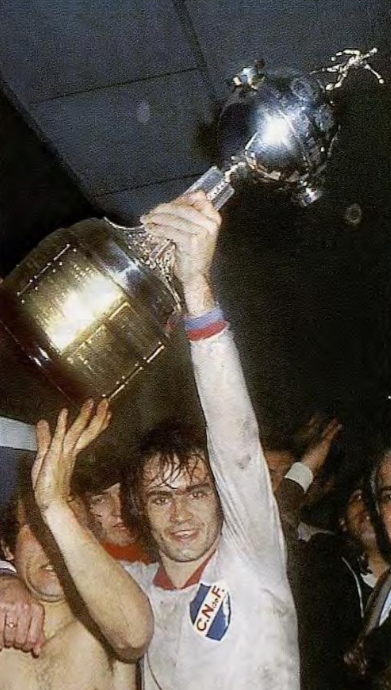
(left): Victorino scoring the winning goal for Nacional; (right): players of Nacional raising the trophy
6 August 1980
Second leg

Nacional (Uruguay)	1–0	(Brazil) Internacional
Victorino 34'	Report

Estadio Centenario, Montevideo
Attendance: 65,000
Referee: Edilson Pérez (Peru)

Nacional	Internacional

GK	1	(Uruguay) Rodolfo Rodríguez
DF	4	(Uruguay) José H. Moreira
DF	2	(Uruguay) Juan Carlos Blanco (c)
DF	3	(Uruguay) Hugo De León
DF	6	(Uruguay) Washington González
MF	5	(Uruguay) Víctor Espárrago
MF	8	(Uruguay) Eduardo de la Peña
MF	10	(Uruguay) Arsenio Luzardo
FW	7	(Uruguay) Alberto Bica
FW	9	(Uruguay) Waldemar Victorino
FW	11	(Uruguay) Julio César Morales
Manager:
(Uruguay) Juan Martín Mugica

GK	1	(Brazil) Gasperin
DF	2	(Brazil) Toninho
DF	3	(Brazil) Mauro Pastor (c)
DF	4	(Brazil) Mauro Galvão
DF	6	(Brazil) Cláudio Mineiro
MF	5	(Brazil) Falcão
MF	8	(Brazil) Batista
MF	10	(Brazil) Jair	Substituted off
FW	7	(Brazil) Chico Spina
FW	9	(Brazil) Adílson
FW	11	(Brazil) Mário Sérgio
Substitutes:
MF		(Brazil) Berreta	Substituted on
Manager:
(Brazil) Ênio Andrade
