= 1985 in Argentine football (Nacional) =

This page covers the period January - September 1985. The rest of 1985 is covered in 1985-86 in Argentine football.

== Nacional 1985 ==
1985 featured the last ever edition of the Nacional championship. The structure of the tournament made it the most complicated championship in the history of the Argentine first division. The eventual champions were Argentinos Juniors who beat Vélez Sársfield in a 2nd final.

=== Group Stages (1st step) ===
The top two teams go through to the winners knockout, the bottom two go to the losers knockout.

==== Group A ====
| Position | Team | Points | Played | Won | Drawn | Lost | For | Against | Difference |
| 1 | Estudiantes La Plata | 9 | 6 | 4 | 1 | 1 | 12 | 4 | 8 |
| 2 | Ramón Santamarina | 5 | 6 | 2 | 1 | 3 | 5 | 6 | -1 |
| 3 | Racing de Córdoba | 5 | 6 | 2 | 1 | 3 | 5 | 8 | -3 |
| 4 | Platense | 5 | 6 | 2 | 1 | 3 | 5 | 9 | -4 |

==== Group B ====
| Position | Team | Points | Played | Won | Drawn | Lost | For | Against | Difference |
| 1 | Boca Juniors | 8 | 6 | 3 | 2 | 1 | 13 | 6 | 7 |
| 2 | Estudiantes Río Cuarto | 7 | 6 | 3 | 1 | 2 | 12 | 12 | 0 |
| 3 | Temperley | 5 | 6 | 2 | 1 | 3 | 8 | 11 | -3 |
| 4 | Altos Hornos Zapla | 4 | 6 | 2 | 0 | 4 | 5 | 9 | -4 |

==== Group C ====
| Position | Team | Points | Played | Won | Drawn | Lost | For | Against | Difference |
| 1 | Independiente | 7 | 6 | 3 | 1 | 2 | 11 | 6 | 5 |
| 2 | Talleres de Córdoba | 7 | 6 | 3 | 1 | 2 | 6 | 6 | 0 |
| 3 | Guaraní Antonio Franco | 7 | 6 | 3 | 1 | 2 | 6 | 8 | -2 |
| 4 | Huracán | 3 | 6 | 0 | 3 | 3 | 7 | 10 | -3 |

==== Group D ====
| Position | Team | Points | Played | Won | Drawn | Lost | For | Against | Difference |
| 1 | River Plate | 10 | 6 | 4 | 2 | 0 | 10 | 4 | 6 |
| 2 | Unión de Santa Fe | 5 | 6 | 1 | 3 | 2 | 9 | 6 | 3 |
| 3 | Gimnasia La Plata | 5 | 6 | 1 | 3 | 2 | 4 | 10 | -6 |
| 4 | Cipolletti | 4 | 6 | 0 | 4 | 2 | 5 | 8 | -3 |

==== Group E ====
| Position | Team | Points | Played | Won | Drawn | Lost | For | Against | Difference |
| 1 | Newell's Old Boys | 8 | 6 | 2 | 4 | 0 | 9 | 6 | 3 |
| 2 | San Lorenzo | 7 | 6 | 2 | 3 | 1 | 10 | 5 | 5 |
| 3 | Huracán Las Heras | 7 | 6 | 2 | 3 | 1 | 8 | 8 | 0 |
| 4 | Círculo Deportivo | 2 | 6 | 1 | 0 | 5 | 6 | 14 | -8 |

==== Group F ====
| Position | Team | Points | Played | Won | Drawn | Lost | For | Against | Difference |
| 1 | Argentinos Juniors | 9 | 6 | 3 | 3 | 0 | 16 | 5 | 11 |
| 2 | Chacarita Juniors | 7 | 6 | 3 | 1 | 2 | 11 | 6 | 5 |
| 3 | Central Norte | 5 | 6 | 1 | 3 | 2 | 4 | 14 | -10 |
| 4 | Belgrano de Córdoba | 3 | 6 | 0 | 3 | 3 | 8 | 14 | -6 |

==== Group G ====
| Position | Team | Points | Played | Won | Drawn | Lost | For | Against | Difference |
| 1 | San Martín Tucumán | 8 | 6 | 3 | 2 | 1 | 12 | 4 | 8 |
| 2 | Vélez Sársfield | 8 | 6 | 2 | 3 | 1 | 11 | 6 | 5 |
| 3 | Argentino de Firmat | 5 | 6 | 2 | 1 | 3 | 5 | 10 | -5 |
| 4 | Juventud Alianza | 3 | 6 | 1 | 1 | 4 | 4 | 12 | -8 |

==== Group H ====
| Position | Team | Points | Played | Won | Drawn | Lost | For | Against | Difference |
| 1 | Ferro Carril Oeste | 9 | 6 | 4 | 1 | 1 | 8 | 2 | 6 |
| 2 | Deportivo Español | 7 | 6 | 3 | 1 | 2 | 9 | 6 | 3 |
| 3 | Instituto de Córdoba | 6 | 6 | 3 | 0 | 3 | 9 | 9 | 0 |
| 4 | Juventud Antoniana | 2 | 6 | 1 | 0 | 5 | 4 | 13 | -9 |

=== 2nd step ===
==== Winners knockout ====
The winners progressed to the winners QF, the losers enter the losers 3rd round.

| Home (1st leg) | Home (2nd leg) | 1st Leg | 2nd leg | Aggregate |
|---|---|---|---|---|
| Independiente | Ramón Santamarina | 3-1 | 3-2 | 6-3 |
| Talleres | Estudiantes La Plata | 1-1 | 1-3 | 2-4 |
| Newell's Old Boys | Chacarita Juniors | 0-0 | 2-1 | 2-1 |
| San Lorenzo | Argentinos Juniors | 2-2 | 0-1 | 2-3 |
| San Martín | Estudiantes RC | 4-2 | 0-0 | 4-2 |
| Boca Juniors | Vélez Sársfield | 3-2 | 0-3 | 3-4 |
| Ferro Carril Oeste | Unión | 1-0 | 2-1 | 3-1 |
| Deportivo Español | River Plate | 2-1 | 0-5 | 2-6 |

==== Losers knockout ====
| Home (1st leg) | Home (2nd leg) | 1st Leg | 2nd leg | Aggregate |
|---|---|---|---|---|
| Guaraní | Platense | 0-0 | 0-1 | 0-1 |
| Huracán | Racing de Córdoba | 2-1 | 1-1 | 3-2 |
| Belgrano | Huracán La Heras | 2-1 | 1-3 | 3-4 |
| Central Norte | Círculo Deportivo | 0-0 | 2-3 | 2-3 |
| Altos Hornos Zapla | Argentino (F) | 2-0 | 1-2 | 3-2 |
| Juventud Alianza | Temperley | 4-3 | 1-4 | 5-7 |
| Cipolletti | Instituto | 0-0 | 1-3 | 1-3 |
| Gimnasia La Plata | Juventud Antoniana | 3-0 | 0-1 | 3-1 |

=== 3rd step ===
Winners Quarter-finals

| | | Score |
|---|---|---|
| San Martín | Argentinos Juniors | 0-2 |
| Ferro Carril Oeste | Independiente | 3-0 |
| River Plate | Estudiantes La Plata | 2-0 |
| Newell's Old Boys | Vélez Sársfield | 1-2 (aet) |

Losers 3rd round

| | | Score |
|---|---|---|
| Estudiantes (RC) | Temperley | 0-1 |
| Gimnasia La Plata | Deportivo Español | 0-2 |
| Unión | Platense | 3-0 |
| Talleres | Instituto | 0-4 |
| Boca Juniors | Altos Hornos Zapla | 3-1 |
| Huracán La Heras | San Lorenzo | 3-3 (2-3 p.k.) |
| Chacarita Juniors | Huracán | 0-0 (4-3 p.k.) |
| Central Norte | Ramón Santamarina | 1-1 (4-2 p.k.) |

=== 4th step ===
Winners Semi-finals

| | | Score |
|---|---|---|
| Ferro Carril Oeste | Argentinos Juniors | 0-3 |
| Vélez Sársfield | River Plate | 3-0 |

Losers 4th round

| | Score | |
|---|---|---|
| Independiente | Boca Juniors | 1-0 |
| Newell's Old Boys | Temperley | 2-1 |
| Chacarita Juniors | San Lorenzo | 2-0 (aet) |
| Estuidaintes (LP) | Deportivo Español | 1-1 (6-5 p.k.) |
| Central Norte | Unión | 0-0 (1-3 p.k.) |
| San Martín | Instituto | 0-0 (4-1 p.k.) |

=== 5th step ===
Winners final

| Home (1st leg) | Home (2nd leg) | 1st Leg | 2nd leg | Aggregate |
|---|---|---|---|---|
| Argentinos Juniors | Vélez Sársfield | 2-0 | 0-2 | 2-2 (4-3 p.k.) |

- Argentinos Juniors to play in the final
- Vélez Sársfield progress to the losers final

Losers 5th round

| | | Score |
|---|---|---|
| Newell's Old Boys | Chacarita Juniors | 1-0 |
| Estudiantes (LP) | San Martín | 1-0 |
| River Plate | Unión | 1-0 |
| Ferro Carril Oeste | Independiente | 0-0 (2-4 p.k.) |

=== 6th step ===
Losers 6th round

| | | Score |
|---|---|---|
| River Plate | Estudiantes (LP) | 4-1 |
| Independiente | Newell's Old Boys | 0-2 |

=== 7th step ===
Losers 7th round

| | | Score |
|---|---|---|
| River Plate | Newell's Old Boys | 2-0 |

=== 8th step ===
Losers final

| | | Score |
|---|---|---|
| Vélez Sársfield | River Plate | 2-1 |

- Vélez Sársfield to play in the final

=== Final ===
August 28, 1985

| | | Score |
|---|---|---|
| Argentinos Juniors | Vélez Sársfield | 1-1 (3-4 p.k.) |

- As Argentinos Juniors had made it to the final without losing a game, the final had to be replayed to give them the 2nd chance that every other team had already had.

September 3, 1985

| | | Score |
|---|---|---|
| Vélez Sársfield | Argentinos Juniors | 1-2 |
