= Marcelo Teuber =

Chilean footballer (born 1984)

Personal information
- Full name: Marcelo Alejandro Teuber Coser
- Date of birth: 15 August 1984 (age 42)
- Place of birth: Chuquicamata, Chile
- Height: 1.81 m (5 ft 11 in)
- Position: Midfielder

Senior career*
Years	Team	Apps	(Gls)
2004	Deportes Puerto Montt	1	(0)
2006	Instituto Nacional	0	(0)
2007–2008	Provincial Osorno	45	(2)
2009	Deportes Puerto Montt	17	(0)
2010–2011	Unión San Felipe	17	(0)
2012–2013	Naval	17	(0)
2013–2014	Curicó Unido	9	(0)
Total		106	(2)
- * Club domestic league appearances and goals

Marcelo Alejandro Teuber Coser (born 15 August 1984) is a Chilean former professional footballer who played as a midfielder. His last club was Curicó Unido.

== Personal life ==
He is the older brother of Samuel Teuber, who was a professional footballer during the 2000s.

== Honours ==
Provincial Osorno

- Primera B: 2007
