= Luis Flores Abarca =

Chilean footballer (born 1982)

Personal information
- Full name: Luis Reinaldo Flores Abarca
- Date of birth: May 3, 1982 (age 44)
- Place of birth: Chile
- Height: 1.75 m (5 ft 9 in)
- Position: Striker

Senior career*
Years	Team	Apps	(Gls)
2005–2006	O'Higgins	12	(0)
2006	Deportes Antofagasta	17	(2)
2007–2011	Ñublense	127	(27)
2015–2017	Ñublense	32	(1)

International career
2007	Chile	2	(1)
- * Club domestic league appearances and goals as of 19 January 2018

Luis Reinaldo Flores Abarca (born 3 May 1982) is a Chilean retired footballer.

== Career and Ñublense ==
Luis Flores started his career the 2000, with 18 years in Palestino, and has played in many teams, like Palestino, O'higgins and Antofagasta, but in 2007 he transferred to Ñublense. He is a very fast forward, and he has a very good control of the ball. He currently has a score of 17 goals in Ñublense, 7 in Apertura 2007, 2 in Clausura 2007, and 8 in Apertura 2008.

=== International goals ===
Scores and results list Chile's goal tally first.

No	Date	Venue	Opponent	Score	Result	Competition
1.	9 May 2007	Estadio Rubén Marcos Peralta, Osorno, Chile	Cuba	3–0	3–0	Friendly
