= Carlos Tapia =

Carlos Tapia may refer to:

- Carlos Daniel Tapia (born 1962), retired Argentine footballer
- Carlos Tapia (Chilean footballer) (born 1977), Chilean footballer for Barnechea
