= Daniel González (footballer, born 1984) =

Chilean footballer

Personal information
- Full name: Daniel Felipe González Calvo
- Date of birth: 30 January 1984 (age 42)
- Place of birth: Quilpué, Chile
- Height: 1.76 m (5 ft 9 in)
- Position: Attacking midfielder

Youth career
- Santa Marta
- Estudiantes de Quilpué
- 2000–2004: Everton

Senior career*
Years	Team	Apps	(Gls)
2004–2006	Everton	83	(11)
2006	→ O'Higgins (loan)	21	(7)
2007	O'Higgins	34	(13)
2008–2012	Colo-Colo	19	(5)
2008	→ Cobreloa (loan)	23	(10)
2009	→ Náutico (loan)	6	(1)
2009	→ O'Higgins (loan)	9	(1)
2010	→ Everton (loan)	11	(1)
2010–2011	→ Cobreloa (loan)	30	(11)
2011–2012	→ Audax Italiano (loan)	29	(6)
2012–2013	Huachipato	49	(5)
2014	Deportes Antofagasta	11	(0)
2015	Barnechea	9	(1)
2015–2016	Trasandino	15	(8)
2016–2017	San Antonio Unido	20	(1)
Total		369	(81)

International career
2007	Chile	3	(1)
- * Club domestic league appearances and goals

Daniel Felipe González Calvo (born 30 January 1984), commonly known as Chucky González, is a former professional footballer who played as an attacking midfielder. Internationally, he made three appearances for the Chile national team, scoring once. He is known in Chile for being a free-kick specialist.

== Club career ==
González was with club Santa Marta Belloto Norte and Estudiantes de Quilpué before joining the Everton de Viña del Mar youth ranks. He began his football career at Everton at their football system top tier, where scored 11 goals in 83 appearances during two seasons. In June 2006, González moved to O'Higgins, club of the same division of Everton based in Rancagua. In January 2008, he was sold to Chilean powerhouse club Colo-Colo, for a US$750.000 transfer fee. After a regular pass at the Colo-Colo team that was runner-up of the Apertura Tournament of that year, he was deemed surplus requirements at Pedreros, thus joining Cobreloa on loan.

In January 2009, he traveled to Brazil and signed for Náutico of the country's first tier in that moment, leaving shortly after not receiving much playing time. Back on his home country, he had spells at O'Higgins and Everton, both loans, but without finding much success.

In June 2010, he returned to Cobreloa, where he became a key part of the Calama team starting eleven, scoring 11 goals during his stay, leaving the team after his one-year loan from Colo-Colo expired. The next season, Gónzalez signed for Audax Italiano, again on loan. At Audax, he played a key part on Audax's season that year, most notably scoring a Hat-trick in a 4–2 away win against La Serena, all of his goals during that match coming from direct free-kicks. Despite being a starter during the year and being on top form throughout the season, he choose to leave the club at the end of the season despite offers from Audax for him to stay.

After terminating his contract with Colo-Colo, he signed for Huachipato, playing regularly, but receiving much criticism for his poor play at the Talcahuano club during the season, especially his low scoring, even from free-kicks. During his first season, he played in 17 matches out of 18, but only scored one goal on regular season, against Iquique at Estadio CAP in a 4–1 victory for the home team.

Huachipato qualified for the championship play-offs that year, with González starting on both matches against Palestino (3–2 victory for Huachipato on aggregate) and also starting on the 1–0 victory against Rangers at home, only missing the return match on Talca after picking up an injury. The return match ended on a 1–1 tie, thus qualifying the steelers to the final for the first time in history. He was left out of the starting eleven of the first leg of the final, against Unión Española at the Santa Laura, only coming on as a sub in the second half. The match ended on a 3–1 for the home side. At the return leg, he was surprisingly put on the starting eleven by coach Jorge Pellicer, despite his low form and injury concerns. He scored two goals on the second leg of the final, one coming from a direct free-kick and adding a second after dribbling two Unión Española players on the run and chipping the ball from outside the box, putting Huachipato 2–1 up at that moment. The match finally ended 3–1 for the home side, and the title was decided by a penalty shoot-out. González unfortunately missed his attempt, sending the ball over the bar, however Huachipato prevailed, winning 3–2 on penalties and becoming Chilean league champions for the second time in history. This is Daniel González first title of his career.

== International career ==
González played internationally with the Chile national team in 2007, playing three friendly matches previous to the Copa América. He scored his first international goal for Chile from a free kick in a victory against Cuba, 2–0, at Estadio Rubén Marcos Peralta during a friendly match in Osorno.

== Coaching career ==
González has led football academies in Viña del Mar. He has also studied for football manager at INAF.

== Personal life ==
He is nicknamed Chucky.

His father was with the Santiago Wanderers youth ranks.

== Career statistics ==
Goal	Date	Venue	Opponent	Score	Result	Competition
1	16 May 2007	Estadio Rubén Marcos Peralta, Osorno, Chile	Cuba	2–0	2–0	Friendly

== Honours ==
Huachipato

- Primera División de Chile: 2012 Apertura
