= Enrique Villalba =

Paraguayan footballer (born 1955)

Personal information
- Full name: Enrique Atanasio Villalba Flor
- Date of birth: 2 January 1955 (age 71)
- Place of birth: Asunción, Paraguay
- Height: 1.84 m (6 ft 0 in)
- Position: Striker

Senior career*
Years	Team	Apps	(Gls)
1973–1979	Olimpia		
1979–1980	Anderlecht		
1980–1982	Tecos		
1982–1983	Tampico Madero		
1983	Millonarios		
1984	River Plate		
1985–1986	Cerro Porteño		
1987–1990	Sport Colombia		

International career
1977–1985	Paraguay	13	(1)
- * Club domestic league appearances and goals

Enrique Atanasio Villalba Flor (born 2 January 1955) is a former Paraguayan football striker. Villalba was a member of Paraguay national team and he won 1979 Copa América with the team.

== Honours ==
=== Club ===
- Olimpia
  - Paraguayan Primera División: 1978, 1979
  - Copa Libertadores: 1979
  - Copa Interamericana: 1979
  - Intercontinental Cup: 1979

=== International ===
- Paraguay
  - Copa América: 1979
