= Rodrigo Barra =

Chilean footballer (born 1975)

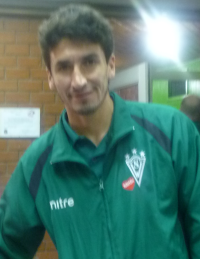

Personal information
- Full name: Rodrigo Alejandro Barra Carrasco
- Date of birth: 24 September 1975 (age 51)
- Place of birth: Traiguén, Chile
- Height: 1.80 m (5 ft 11 in)
- Position: Defender

Team information
- Current team: Santiago Wanderers

Senior career*
Years	Team	Apps	(Gls)
1997	Iberia		
1998	Temuco	27	(0)
1999–2000	Puerto Montt	24	(1)
2001–2005	Santiago Wanderers	131	(4)
2006	Cobresal	29	(0)
2007	Ñublense	19	(3)
2008	Rangers	14	(3)
2009–2013	Santiago Wanderers	29	(0)

International career^{‡}
2001	Chile	0	(0)
- * Club domestic league appearances and goals as of 17 March 2020 ‡ National team caps and goals as of 17 March 2020

Rodrigo Alejandro Barra Carrasco (born 24 September 1975) was a Chilean professional footballer.

He played for Santiago Wanderers.

El Gráfico (Chile) magazine selected Barra in its ideal eleven for the year 2008.

== Honours ==
=== Club ===
Santiago Wanderers

- Primera División de Chile (1): 2001

Deportes Antofagasta

- Primera B (2): 2011 Apertura, 2011
