= 1984 in Argentine football =

Football in Argentina
- Season: 1984

In 1984 Ferro Carril Oeste won the Nacional, Argentinos Juniors won the Metropolitano and Independiente won the Copa Libertadores 1984.

== Nacional 1984 ==
=== Group stages ===
Group A

Position	Team	Points	Played	Won	Drawn	Lost	For	Against	Difference
1	Newell's Old Boys	8	6	3	2	1	9	8	1
2	Talleres de Córdoba	7	6	3	1	2	14	11	3
3	Boca Juniors	7	6	2	3	1	7	5	2
4	Ferro Carril Oeste (GP)	2	6	0	2	4	6	12	-6

Group B

Position	Team	Points	Played	Won	Drawn	Lost	For	Against	Difference
1	San Lorenzo	9	6	3	3	0	14	8	6
2	Gimnasia de Mendoza	5	6	0	5	1	10	11	-1
3	Unión de General Pinedo	5	6	0	5	1	6	7	-1
4	Temperley	5	6	0	5	1	6	10	-4

Group C

Position	Team	Points	Played	Won	Drawn	Lost	For	Against	Difference
1	Belgrano de Córdoba	9	6	4	1	1	8	4	4
2	Rosario Central	8	6	3	2	1	9	6	3
3	Vélez Sársfield	6	6	2	2	2	9	6	3
4	Central Norte	1	6	0	1	5	2	12	-10

Group D

Position	Team	Points	Played	Won	Drawn	Lost	For	Against	Difference
1	River Plate	11	6	5	1	0	22	5	17
2	Huracán	8	6	4	0	2	14	8	6
3	Estudiantes de Río Cuarto	4	6	1	2	3	9	10	-1
4	Atlético Uruguay	1	6	0	1	5	2	24	-22

Group E

Position	Team	Points	Played	Won	Drawn	Lost	For	Against	Difference
1	Ferro Carril Oeste	9	6	3	3	0	12	6	6
2	Instituto de Córdoba	7	6	2	3	1	11	6	5
3	Platense	7	6	2	3	1	7	7	0
4	Altos Hornos Zapla	1	6	0	1	5	2	13	-11

Group F

Position	Team	Points	Played	Won	Drawn	Lost	For	Against	Difference
1	Independiente	9	6	4	1	1	10	3	7
2	Atlético Tucumán	5	6	2	1	3	7	7	0
3	Chacarita Juniors	2	6	4	0	2	14	6	8
4	Kimberley	2	6	0	2	4	3	18	-15

Group G

Position	Team	Points	Played	Won	Drawn	Lost	For	Against	Difference
1	Argentinos Juniors	9	6	3	3	0	10	4	6
2	Racing de Córdoba	6	6	1	4	1	6	7	-1
3	Unión de Santa Fe	5	6	2	1	3	9	12	-3
4	Atlético Ledesma	4	6	1	2	3	9	11	-2

Group H

Position	Team	Points	Played	Won	Drawn	Lost	For	Against	Difference
1	Estudiantes de La Plata	11	6	5	1	0	15	5	10
2	Olimpo de Bahía Blanca	7	6	3	1	2	10	9	1
3	Atlanta	5	6	2	1	3	9	9	0
4	Unión de San Vicente	1	6	0	1	5	6	17	-11

=== Knockout stages ===
2nd round

Home (1st leg)	Home (2nd leg)	1st Leg	2nd leg	Aggregate
Belgrano	Atlético Tucumán	2-0	0-0	2-0
Racing de Córdoba	San Lorenzo	1-1	1-3	2-4
Estudiantes La Plata	Talleres	0-1	1-1	1-2
Rosario Central	Independiente	1-1	0-1	1-2
Instituto	River Plate	0-2	0-0	0-2
Ferro Carril Oeste	Huracán	1-0	0-1	1-1 (7-6 p.k.)
Olimpo	Newell's Old Boys	0-0	1-1	1-1 (6-7 p.k.)
Argentinos Juniors	Gimnasia de Mendoza	3-2	2-1	5-3

Quarter-final

Home (1st leg)	Home (2nd leg)	1st Leg	2nd leg	Aggregate
Belgrano	River Plate	0-4	2-0	2-4
Argentinos Juniors	Talleres	2-1	2-4	4-5
Newell's Old Boys	San Lorenzo	2-2	1-2	3-4
Ferro Carril Oeste	Independiente	1-1	1-0	2-1

Semi-final

Home (1st leg)	Home (2nd leg)	1st Leg	2nd leg	Aggregate
San Lorenzo	River Plate	1-2	1-2	2-4
Ferro Carril Oeste	Talleres	1-0	1-1	2-1

=== Final ===
Home (1st leg)	Home (2nd leg)	1st Leg	2nd leg	Aggregate
River Plate	Ferro Carril Oeste	0-3	0-1	0-4

- Ferro Carril Oeste qualified for the Copa Libertadores 1985 as champions of Nacional 1984

== Metropolitano 1984 ==
=== League table ===
Position	Team	Points	Played	Won	Drawn	Lost	For	Against	Difference
1	Argentinos Juniors	51	36	20	11	5	69	36	33
2	Ferro Carril Oeste	50	36	19	12	5	46	18	28
3	Estudiantes de La Plata	48	36	21	6	9	49	27	22
4	River Plate	43	36	15	13	8	51	38	13
5	Racing de Córdoba	43	36	16	11	9	42	31	11
6	Vélez Sársfield	42	36	14	14	8	43	32	11
7	Newell's Old Boys	38	36	17	4	15	36	39	-3
8	San Lorenzo	37	36	11	15	10	47	46	1
9	Talleres de Córdoba	34	36	11	12	13	56	55	1
10	Chacarita Juniors	34	36	11	12	13	30	36	-6
11	Instituto de Córdoba	33	36	13	7	16	46	47	-1
12	Platense	33	36	10	13	13	34	45	-11
13	Temperley	31	36	9	13	14	23	28	-5
14	Independiente	31	36	10	11	15	45	59	-14
15	Unión de Santa Fe	30	36	11	8	17	43	46	-3
16	Boca Juniors	30	36	10	10	16	34	49	-15
17	Huracán	27	36	9	9	18	36	55	-19
18	Rosario Central	25	36	7	11	18	27	41	-14
19	Atlanta	24	36	8	8	20	32	61	-29

=== Relegation table ===
Team	1982	1983	1984	Total points	Seasons	Points average
Estudiantes de La Plata	54	38	48	140	3	46.66
Ferro Carril Oeste	37	46	50	133	3	44.33
Independiente	52	48	31	131	3	43.67
Vélez Sársfield	42	44	42	128	3	42.67
San Lorenzo	N/A	47	37	84	2	42.00
Newell's Old Boys	44	35	38	117	3	39.00
Argentinos Juniors	28	36	51	115	3	38.33
Boca Juniors	48	37	30	115	3	38.33
Racing de Córdoba	39	27	43	109	3	36.33
River Plate	34	29	43	106	3	35.33
Chacarita Juniors	N/A	N/A	34	34	1	34.00
Instituto de Córdoba	33	35	33	101	3	33.67
Huracán	41	32	27	100	3	33.33
Talleres de Córdoba	33	33	34	100	3	33.33
Temperley	N/A	33	31	64	2	32.00
Platense	28	34	33	95	3	31.67
Unión de Santa Fe	27	38	30	95	3	31.67
Rosario Central	37	30	25	92	3	30.67
Atlanta	N/A	N/A	24	24	1	24.00

== Copa Libertadores 1984 ==
Argentine teams in Copa Libertadores 1984

- Independiente: Champions
- Estudiantes de La Plata: 1st round
