= Roberto Gargini =

Argentine footballer

Personal information
- Full name: Roberto Walter Gargini
- Date of birth: 30 April 1962 (age 64)
- Place of birth: Trelew, Argentina
- Position: Forward

Senior career*
Years	Team	Apps	(Gls)
1974–1979	Huracán de Trelew		
1979	Unión de Santa Fe		
1980	Huracán de Trelew		
1981–1986	Ferro Carril Oeste	72	(3)
1986–1990	Chaco For Ever		
1990–1991	PAS Giannina	3	(0)
1992	Alvarado		
1993	Germinal de Rawson		
1994	Racing de Trelew		
1995–1996	Huracán de Trelew		
- * Club domestic league appearances and goals

Roberto Gargini (born 30 April 1962 in Trelew) is a former Argentine professional football (soccer) player.

== Club career ==
Gargini played for Ferro Carril Oeste and Chaco For Ever in the Primera División de Argentina. He had also had a spell with PAS Giannina in the Super League Greece during the 1990–91 season.
