= Mario Noremberg =

Argentine footballer

Personal information
- Full name: Hugo Mario Noremberg
- Date of birth: 15 May 1962 (age 64)
- Place of birth: Oberá, Misiones, Argentina
- Position: Forward

Senior career*
Years	Team	Apps	(Gls)
1983–1987	Ferro Carril Oeste	88	(20)
1987–1990	Chaco For Ever	?	(?)
1990–1991	Gençlerbirliği	23	(6)
1991–1992	Estudiantes de La Plata	10	(2)
1992	Ferro Carril Oeste	(see above)	
?	Quilmes	?	(?)
- * Club domestic league appearances and goals

Hugo Mario Noremberg (born 15 May 1962) is a former Argentine footballer.

Noremberg played for several clubs in the Primera División Argentina, beginning with Ferro Carril Oeste where he won the 1984 Nacional Championship and finishing with Estudiantes de La Plata. He also had a spell with Gençlerbirliği S.K. in the Turkish Super Lig.
