= Samuel Teuber =

Chilean footballer (born 1987)

Personal information
- Full name: José Samuel Teuber Coser
- Date of birth: 13 February 1987 (age 39)
- Place of birth: Chuquicamata, Chile
- Height: 1.82 m (6 ft 0 in)
- Position: Forward

Youth career
- 1997–2004: Universidad Católica

Senior career*
Years	Team	Apps	(Gls)
2004–2005	Deportes Puerto Montt	1	(0)
2006	Instituto Nacional	–	(–)
2007	Everton	11	(1)
2008	Provincial Osorno	27	(6)
2009–2014	O'Higgins	67	(15)
2011	→ Grosseto (loan)	0	(0)
2012	→ Palestino (loan)	10	(1)
2013–2014	→ Santiago Morning (loan)	24	(4)
Total		139	(27)

International career
2007	Chile U20	4	(0)
- * Club domestic league appearances and goals

José Samuel Teuber Coser (born 13 February 1987), known as Samuel Teuber, is a Chilean former professional footballer who played as a forward.

== Club career ==
Born in Chuquicamata, Teuber began his football career at Universidad Católica, Chilean powerhouse club of Las Condes. After many years in Universidad Católica's youth system, he moved to Deportes Puerto Montt in 2004, joining three years after to Everton, in where he scored one goal in eleven matches during his debut season. The next season, Teuber signed for Provincial Osorno, in where he played along with his brother Marcelo.

In January 2009, he joined to O'Higgins, team managed by Jorge Sampaoli in that moment. After very successful seasons at the team of Rancagua, Teuber completed a six-month loan with Italian Serie B side Grosseto in 2011, but on mid year, Teuber returned to his old team for play the Clausura Tournament, after an unsuccessful spell in Europe.

== International career ==
After representing Chile U20 at both a tournament in Japan and a friendly match against Mexico U20, he had the opportunity of integrate the final squad that achieved the third place at the 2007 FIFA U-20 World Cup held in Canada, but the coach José Sulantay not included him in the 23-man squad.

== Personal life ==
He is the younger brother of the former footballer Marcelo Teuber.

== After football ==
Since 2017, he has worked as manager of FTA Tour USA, organising football tennis tournaments in countries such as the United States and Chile.
