= John Jairo Castillo =

Colombian football striker (born 1984)

Personal information
- Date of birth: 20 April 1984 (age 42)
- Place of birth: Cali, Colombia
- Height: 1.78 m (5 ft 10 in)
- Position: Striker

Youth career
- Deportes Tolima

Senior career*
Years	Team	Apps	(Gls)
2000	Millonarios	3	(1)
2001	América de Cali	8	(0)
2004	Cortuluá		
2005	Oriente Petrolero	20	(17)
2005	Once Caldas	5	(0)
2006	Girardot		
2006	Cortuluá		
2007	Deportes Tolima	10	(0)
2007	Guaros	18	(12)
2008	Colo-Colo	12	(1)
2008	Everton	11	(0)
2010	Cortuluá	16	(3)
2010–2011	Itagüí	6	(0)
2011–2012	Universitario Popayán	3	(0)
2012	Portuguesa	11	(3)
2013–2014	UdeG	8	(0)
2014–2015	Platense		
2015	UTC	5	(1)
2016	Santa Rosa		
- * Club domestic league appearances and goals

John Jairo Castillo (born 20 April 1984) is a Colombian former footballer who played as a striker.

Castillo's first name is sometimes spelled Jhon and his nickname is "Tigrillo".

== Club career ==
He signed with Everton in January 2008 on a long-team contract. He has played for numerous Colombian teams such as Deportes Tolima in the Copa Mustang and also for Bolivian club Oriente Petrolero and for Venezuelan club Guaros.
