= 1985–86 in Argentine football =

Football in Argentina
- Season: 1985–86

1985–86 in Argentine football saw the introduction of "European Style seasons" in the Argentine first division. The league title was won by River Plate. Argentinos Juniors were the winners of the Copa Libertadores 1985.

== Primera División ==
=== League table ===
Position	Team	Points	Played	Won	Drawn	Lost	For	Against	Difference
	River Plate	56	36	23	10	3	74	26	48
2	Newell's Old Boys	46	36	15	16	5	46	30	16
3	Deportivo Español	46	36	18	10	8	41	35	6
4	Argentinos Juniors	44	36	16	12	8	47	39	8
5	Boca Juniors	41	36	14	13	9	57	47	10
6	Ferro Carril Oeste	40	36	12	16	8	45	33	12
7	San Lorenzo	40	36	14	12	10	43	33	10
8	Talleres de Córdoba	37	36	10	17	9	43	37	6
9	Independiente	36	36	15	6	15	38	36	2
10	Gimnasia de La Plata	36	36	9	18	9	29	36	-7
11	Instituto de Córdoba	35	36	11	13	12	33	33	0
12	Vélez Sársfield	34	36	11	12	13	48	48	0
13	Huracán	32	36	10	12	14	44	47	-3
14	Unión de Santa Fe	31	36	9	13	14	27	38	-11
15	Temperley	29	36	8	13	15	44	60	-16
16	Estudiantes de La Plata	27	36	10	7	19	33	47	-14
17	Platense	27	36	7	13	16	37	55	-18
18	Racing de Córdoba	26	36	6	14	16	31	52	-21
19	Chacarita Juniors	21	36	5	11	20	24	53	-31

=== Relegation ===
Relegation was determined by averaging the number of points obtained over the three previous seasons

==== Relegation table ====
Team	1983	1984	1985-1986	Total points	Seasons	Points average
Deportivo Español	N/A	N/A	46	46	1	46.00
Ferro Carril Oeste	46	50	40	136	3	45.33
Argentinos Juniors	36	51	44	131	3	43.66
River Plate	29	43	56	128	3	42.33
San Lorenzo	47	37	40	124	3	41.33
Vélez Sársfield	44	42	34	120	3	40.00
Newell's Old Boys	35	38	46	119	3	39.67
Independiente	48	31	36	115	3	38.33
Estudiantes de La Plata	38	48	27	113	3	37.67
Boca Juniors	37	30	41	108	3	36.00
Gimnasia de La Plata	N/A	N/A	36	36	1	36.00
Talleres de Córdoba	33	34	37	104	3	34.67
Instituto de Córdoba	35	33	35	103	3	34.33
Unión de Santa Fe	38	30	31	99	3	33.00
Racing de Córdoba	27	43	26	96	3	32.00
Platense	34	33	27	94	3	31.33
Temperley	33	31	29	93	3	31.00
Huracán	32	27	32	91	3	30.33
Chacarita Juniors	N/A	34	21	55	2	27.50

- Chacarita Juniors were relegated directly
- Huracán played in the Octagonal promotion tournament.

==== Octagonal tournament ====
Quarter Finals

Home (1st leg)	Home (2nd leg)	1st Leg	2nd leg	Aggregate
Huracán	Lanús	2-0	3-2	5-2
Los Andes	Deportivo Armenio	1-0	2-2	3-2
Banfield	Defensa y Justicia	2-0	2-2	4-2
Deportivo Italiano	Tigre	2-0	2-1	4-1

Semi-finals

Home (1st leg)	Home (2nd leg)	1st Leg	2nd leg	Aggregate
Huracán	Los Andes	1-0	3-1	4-1
Deportivo Italiano	Banfield	1-0	1-2	2-2 (4-3 p.k.)

Final

Home (1st leg)	Home (2nd leg)	1st Leg	2nd leg	Aggregate
Deportivo Armenio	Huracán	1-0	1-2	2-2 (4-2 p.k.)

=== Qualification for Copa Libertadores 1986 ===
- River Plate qualified as League champions
- Argentinos Juniors qualified as Copa Libertadores holders
- The remaining qualification place was determined by the Liguella Pre-Libertadores

==== Liguella Pre-Libertadores ====
Qualifying round

Home (1st leg)	Home (2nd leg)	1st Leg	2nd leg	Aggregate
Alianza de Cutral Có	Boca Juniors	1-2	1-2	2-4
Concepción	Vélez Sársfield	0-3	1-2	1-5
Ferro Carril Oeste	Güemes	2-1	2-1	4-2
San Lorenzo	Guaraní Antonio Franco	4-1	3-0	7-1

Quarter-finals

		Score
Ferro Carril Oeste	Deportivo Español	4-1 (aet)
Newell's Old Boys	Belgrano de Córdoba	2-1
Olimpo de Bahía Blanca	Boca Juniors	2-3
San Lorenzo	Vélez Sársfield	0-0 (4-3 p.k.)

Semi-finals

Home (1st leg)	Home (2nd leg)	1st Leg	2nd leg	Aggregate
Newell's Old Boys	Ferro Carril Oeste	1-0	1-1	2-1
San Lorenzo	Boca Juniors	1-2	0-0	1-2

Final

Home (1st leg)	Home (2nd leg)	1st Leg	2nd leg	Aggregate
Boca Juniors	Newell's Old Boys	0-2	4-1	4-3

- Boca Juniors qualify for the Copa Libertadores 1986.

== Copa Libertadores ==
Argentine teams in Copa Libertadores 1985

- Argentinos Juniors: Champions
- Independiente: Semi-finalists
- Ferro Carril Oeste: 1st round
