= Roberto Reyes (footballer) =

Chilean footballer (born 1988)

Personal information
- Full name: Roberto Andrés Reyes Loyola
- Date of birth: 4 February 1988 (age 38)
- Place of birth: Viña del Mar, Chile
- Height: 1.70 m (5 ft 7 in)
- Position: Midfielder

Youth career
- Everton

Senior career*
Years	Team	Apps	(Gls)
2007–2012	Everton	55	(3)
2014	→ Deportes Copiapó (loan)	15	(1)
2013	Cobresal	3	(0)
2014–2017	Santiago Morning	108	(6)
2018	Ñublense	26	(2)
2019–2020	Barnechea	17	(0)
2021	Deportes Concepción	16	(1)
Total		240	(13)
- * Club domestic league appearances and goals

Roberto Andrés Reyes Loyola (born 4 February 1988) is a Chilean former footballer who played as a midfielder.

== Club career ==
Product of Everton youth set-up, he was member of the 2008 Torneo Apertura team champion.

He retired at the end of the 2021 season as a player of Deportes Concepción in the Segunda División Profesional de Chile.

== Honours ==
Everton

- Primera División de Chile (1): 2008 Apertura
- Primera B (1): 2011 Apertura
