= Domingo Salcedo =

Paraguayan footballer and coach (born 1983)

José Domingo Salcedo
Personal information
- Full name: José Domingo Salcedo Gonzalez
- Date of birth: 9 November 1983 (age 43)
- Place of birth: Fernando de la Mora, Paraguay
- Height: 1.81 m (5 ft 11 in)
- Positions: Left midfielder; left back

Team information
- Current team: Cerro Porteño (reserves head coach)

Senior career*
Years	Team	Apps	(Gls)
2001–2007	Cerro Porteño	109	(12)
2007	Racing Club	15	(0)
2008–2011	Colo-Colo	67	(4)
2010	→ Cerro Porteño (loan)	14	(0)
2011–2012	Cerro Porteño	25	(2)
2013	Rubio Ñú	19	(0)
2013	Deportivo Capiatá	21	(0)
2014	3 de Febrero	37	(0)
2015	Sol de América	36	(0)
2016	Libertad	1	(0)
2017–2019	Sol de América	33	(0)
2019	San Lorenzo	9	(0)

International career
2005–2007	Paraguay	5	(0)

Managerial career
- 2019: Cerro Porteño (assistant)
- 2020–: Cerro Porteño (reserves)
- * Club domestic league appearances and goals

José Domingo Salcedo González (born 9 November 1983) is a retired Paraguayan football midfielder and current head coach of Cerro Porteño's reserve team.

== Career ==
=== Club career ===
Salcedo started his career with Paraguayan club Cerro Porteño, before signing for Argentine Racing Club de Avellaneda in 2007. In January 2008, Salcedo signed for Colo-Colo of Chile. Salcedo is one of Colo-Colo's third most expensive acquisitions, costing Colo-Colo more than $1 million, only below Lucas Barrios with $2 million and Macnelly Torres who cost the club $2.4 million.

In 2010 Salcedo returned to Cerro Porteño.

=== International career ===
In June 2007, he was selected for the Paraguay national football team that competed in the 2007 Copa América.

=== Coaching career ===
On 9 October 2019 it was confirmed, that Salcedo would retire and continue as an assistant coach to interim head coach Víctor Bernay at his former club, Cerro Porteño, for the rest of the season. A new head coach was hired at the end of the year, and Salcedo continued as head coach for the club's reserve team for 2020.

== Personal life ==
Domingo is the brother of Paraguayan footballer Santiago Salcedo.

== Honours ==
=== Club ===
Colo-Colo

- Primera División de Chile (2): 2008 Clausura, 2009 Clausura
