= Rodrigo Rivera (footballer, born 1983) =

Chilean footballer

Personal information
- Full name: Rodrigo Osvaldo Rivera Godoy
- Date of birth: December 3, 1983 (age 42)
- Place of birth: Iquique, Chile
- Height: 1.83 m (6 ft 0 in)
- Position: Centre back

Youth career
- Coquimbo Unido

Senior career*
Years	Team	Apps	(Gls)
2003–2006	Coquimbo Unido	49	(3)
2007–2009	Universidad de Chile	33	(1)
2010	Huachipato	4	(0)
2011	Ñublense	12	(1)
2012	Curicó Unido	11	(0)

International career
2007	Chile	1	(0)
- * Club domestic league appearances and goals as of 17 June 2012

Rodrigo Osvaldo Rivera Godoy (born December 3, 1983) is a Chilean footballer.

== Career ==
Rivera began playing professionally in 2003 with Coquimbo Unido where he played until the end of 2006.

During the January 2007 transfer window he joined and in January 2010 he joined Universidad de Chile. He made his international debut in 2007 and was part of the squad that won the Apertura 2009 championship.

In January 2010 he joined Huachipato on loan. But he finally signed a contract after being released by Universidad de Chile.

He was reported as missing after the Chile earthquake in 2010, but later reports in early March indicated he was unharmed.

== Personal life ==
He is son of Rolando Rivera, a historical goalkeeper of Coquimbo Unido.

== Honours ==
=== Club ===
Universidad de Chile

- Primera División de Chile (1): 2009 Apertura
