= Carlos Tapia (Chilean footballer) =

Chilean footballer (born 1977)

Personal information
- Full name: Carlos Mauricio Tapia Pavez
- Date of birth: 18 September 1977 (age 49)
- Place of birth: Santiago, Chile
- Height: 1.83 m (6 ft 0 in)
- Position: Centre-back

Senior career*
Years	Team	Apps	(Gls)
1998–2003	Unión Española	64	(1)
2003–2004	Universidad Católica	44	(1)
2005	Unión Española	18	(0)
2005	Everton	1	(0)
2006–2011	Deportes La Serena	134	(2)
2011–2012	Barnechea	20	(1)
- * Club domestic league appearances and goals as of 18 March 2020

Carlos Mauricio Tapia Pavez (born 18 September 1977) was a Chilean footballer.

He is remembered for his spells at Unión Española and Deportes La Serena.

== Honours ==
=== Club ===
Unión Española

- Primera B (1): 1999
- Primera División de Chile (1): 2005 Apertura
