= Atlético Uruguay =

Argentine football club

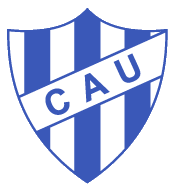
- Full name: Club Atlético Uruguay
- Nickname(s): Decano
- Founded: 1 September 1904; 120 years ago
- Ground: Estadio Simón Plazaola, Concepción del Uruguay, Entre Ríos Province, Argentina
- League: Torneo Argentino B
| Home colours | Away colours |

Club Atlético Uruguay is an Argentine football club, located in Concepción del Uruguay, Entre Ríos Province. The team currently plays at Torneo Argentino B, the regionalised 4th division of Argentine football league system.

The club were founded on 1 September 1904 and played at the highest level of Argentine football only once, the National tournament of 1984. Atlético Uruguay finished bottom of its group and only managed one draw in six matches played, as well as being heavily defeated 5–0 and 6–0 by River Plate and 7–0 by Huracán.
