= Alberto Bica =

Uruguayan footballer (1958–2021)

Personal information
- Full name: Alberto Viller Bica Alonso
- Date of birth: 11 February 1958
- Place of birth: Montevideo, Uruguay
- Date of death: 22 August 2021 (aged 63)
- Position: Right winger

International career
Years	Team	Apps	(Gls)
1979–1981	Uruguay	9	(1)

Alberto Viller Bica Alonso (11 February 1958 – 22 August 2021) was a Uruguayan footballer who played as a right winger. He played in nine matches for the Uruguay national team from 1979 to 1981. He was also part of Uruguay's squad for the 1979 Copa América tournament.

Bica died on 22 August 2021, aged 63, after living with leukemia for 16 years.
