= Estadio Rubén Marcos Peralta =

Stadium in Osorno, Chile

Coordinates: 40°35′00″S 73°07′54″W

Estadio Municipal Rubén Marcos Peralta
- El Parque
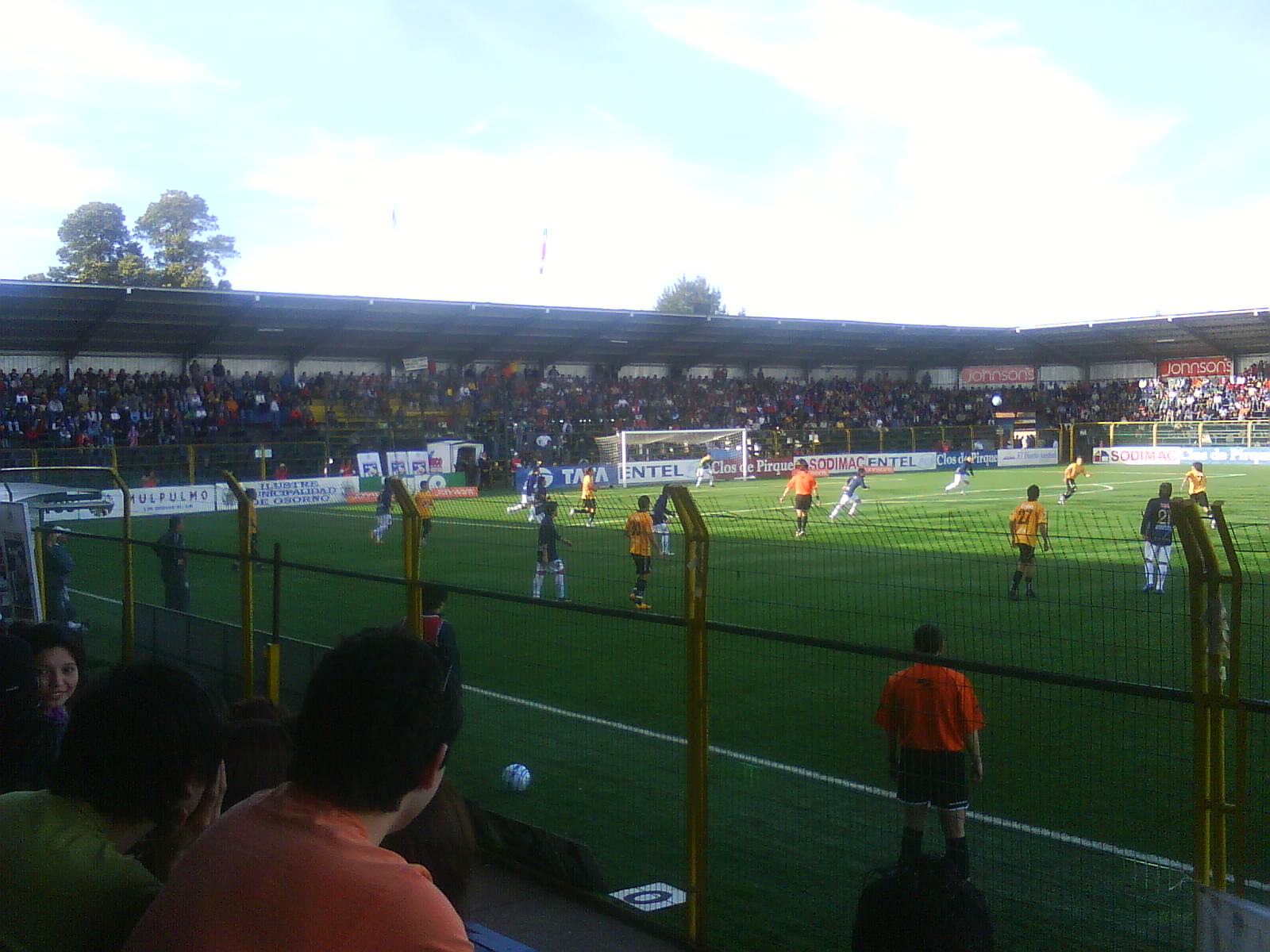
- Interactive map of Estadio Municipal Rubén Marcos Peralta
- Former names: Parque Schott
- Location: Osorno, Chile
- Owner: Illustrious Municipality of Osorno
- Capacity: 10,000
- Surface: Artificial grass

Construction
- Opened: 1940

Tenant
- Provincial Osorno

Estadio Rubén Marcos Peralta, formerly known as Parque Schott, is a football stadium located in Osorno, Chile. It serves as the home ground for the Provincial Osorno club. The stadium was originally constructed in 1940 and has a seating capacity of 10,000 spectators. The majority of the stands feature wooden structures, and more than eighty percent of the seating area is covered by a roof.

In August 2006, the stadium underwent a significant renovation, which included the replacement of the natural grass pitch with artificial turf. Following the completion of the renovations, the stadium was re-inaugurated in November 2006 under its current official name, paying tribute to the local football legend, Rubén Marcos Peralta. Peralta, who played for Universidad de Chile and the Chilean National Team during the 1960s, is honored by the stadium's name.

== Record attendance ==
- 11,357 set on August 26, 1995, (Primera Division 1995), Provincial Osorno vs. Universidad de Chile
