= 1981 FIFA World Youth Championship squads =

FIFA championship roster

Below are the rosters for the 1981 FIFA World Youth Championship tournament in Australia. Those marked in bold went on to earn full international caps.

== Group A ==
=== Poland ===
Head coach: Waldemar Obrebski

No.	Pos.	Player	Date of birth (age)	Caps	Club
1	GK	**Józef Wandzik**	13 August 1963 (aged 18)		(Poland) Ruch Chorzów
2	MF	Robert Grzanka	6 September 1962 (aged 19)		(Poland) Motor Lublin
3	MF	**Zbigniew Kaczmarek**	1 June 1963 (aged 18)		(Poland) Stoczniowiec Gdańsk
4	DF	**Kazimierz Sokołowski**	10 February 1963 (aged 18)		(Poland) Pogoń Szczecin
5	DF	Henryk Majer	29 January 1963 (aged 18)		(Poland) Odra Opole
6	MF	**Ryszard Tarasiewicz**	27 April 1962 (aged 19)		(Poland) Śląsk Wrocław
7	DF	**Dariusz Wdowczyk**	25 September 1962 (aged 19)		(Poland) Gwardia Warszawa
8	FW	**Jan Urban**	14 May 1962 (aged 19)		(Poland) Zagłębie Sosnowiec
9	FW	Erwin Koźlik	4 February 1962 (aged 19)		(Poland) Górnik Zabrze
10	FW	**Dariusz Dziekanowski**	30 September 1962 (aged 19)		(Poland) Gwardia Warszawa
11	MF	**Piotr Rzepka**	18 August 1961 (aged 20)		(Poland) Bałtyk Gdynia
12	GK	Jerzy Zajda	10 May 1963 (aged 18)		(Poland) Zaglebie Wałbrzych
13	MF	Jerzy Kowalik	15 October 1961 (aged 19)		(Poland) Wisła Kraków
14	DF	**Modest Boguszewski**	8 January 1963 (aged 18)		(Poland) Motor Lublin
15	MF	**Mirosław Pękala**	15 October 1961 (aged 19)		(Poland) Śląsk Wrocław
16	DF	**Roman Geszlecht**	28 December 1961 (aged 19)		(Poland) Zagłębie Sosnowiec
17	MF	**Tadeusz Świątek**	8 November 1961 (aged 19)		(Poland) Wisła Płock
18	FW	Andrzej Łatka	31 October 1962 (aged 18)		(Poland) Stal Mielec

=== Qatar ===
Head coach: (Brazil) Evaristo de Macedo

No.	Pos.	Player	Date of birth (age)	Caps	Club
1	GK	**Younes Ahmed**	17 August 1963 (aged 18)		(Qatar) Al-Rayyan
2	DF	Mohammed Al-Sowaidi	25 June 1962 (aged 19)		(Qatar) Al-Arabi
3	DF	Abdullah Mubarak	5 August 1962 (aged 19)		(Qatar) Al-Ahli
4	DF	Jamal Khalifah	4 December 1961 (aged 19)		(Qatar) Al-Rayyan
5	DF	Adel Malallah	15 September 1961 (aged 20)		(Qatar) Al-Ahli
6	MF	Sameer Sultan	8 November 1961 (aged 19)		(Qatar) Al-Ahli
7	FW	Khamis Sultan	3 November 1961 (aged 19)		(Qatar) Al-Rayyan
8	MF	Mohamed Saeed Afifa	7 December 1962 (aged 18)		(Qatar) Al-Rayyan
9	FW	Badr Bilal	4 November 1962 (aged 18)		(Qatar) Al-Sadd
10	MF	Nasser Salem	4 March 1962 (aged 19)		(Qatar) Al Arabi
11	FW	Khamis Daham	3 December 1961 (aged 19)		(Qatar) Al-Arabi
12	FW	**Ali Zaid**	20 January 1961 (aged 20)		(Qatar) Al-Arabi
13	MF	Majed Bakheet	4 October 1961 (aged 19)		Qatar SC
14	MF	Ibrahim Khalfan	25 October 1961 (aged 19)		(Qatar) Al-Arabi
15	MF	Issa Al-Mohammadi	19 December 1963 (aged 17)		(Qatar) Al-Ahli
16	DF	**Khalid Salman**	5 April 1962 (aged 19)		(Qatar) Al-Sadd
17	MF	Mansour Mubarak	9 October 1961 (aged 19)		(Qatar) Al Ahli
18	GK	Ahmad Al-Majed	18 June 1962 (aged 19)		(Qatar) Al-Arabi

=== Uruguay ===
Head coach: Raúl Bentancor

No.	Pos.	Player	Date of birth (age)	Caps	Club
1	GK	Carlos Arias	13 September 1961 (aged 20)		(Uruguay) Fénix
2	DF	**Nelson Gutiérrez**	13 April 1962 (aged 19)		(Uruguay) Peñarol
3	MF	**José Enrique Peña**	7 May 1963 (aged 18)		(Uruguay) Huracán Buceo
4	MF	Carlos Vásquez	12 March 1962 (aged 19)		(Uruguay) Bella Vista
5	MF	Carlos Berrueta	21 August 1961 (aged 20)		(Uruguay) Danubio
6	MF	Carlos Melián	5 September 1961 (aged 20)		(Uruguay) Wanderers
7	FW	**Carlos Aguilera**	21 September 1964 (aged 17)		(Uruguay) Nacional
8	MF	Javier López Báez	19 July 1962 (aged 19)		(Uruguay) River Plate
9	FW	**Jorge da Silva**	11 December 1961 (aged 19)		(Uruguay) Defensor Sporting
10	FW	**Enzo Francescoli**	12 November 1961 (aged 19)		(Uruguay) Wanderers
11	FW	Jorge Villazán	5 October 1962 (aged 18)		(Uruguay) Nacional
12	GK	**Javier Zeoli**	2 May 1962 (aged 19)		(Uruguay) Danubio
13	MF	Eduardo Linaris	26 April 1962 (aged 19)		(Uruguay) River Plate
14	MF	Gustavo Ancheta	21 November 1963 (aged 17)		(Uruguay) Miramar Misiones
15	DF	**José Batista**	6 March 1962 (aged 19)		(Uruguay) Cerro
16	MF	Yubert Lemos	12 June 1962 (aged 19)		(Uruguay) Nacional
17	FW	**Adolfo Barán**	22 November 1961 (aged 19)		(Uruguay) Rentistas
18	FW	Alexis Noble	5 May 1963 (aged 18)		(Uruguay) Peñarol

=== United States ===
Head coach: Walt Chyzowych

No.	Pos.	Player	Date of birth (age)	Caps	Club
1	GK	Craig Scarpelli	17 September 1963 (aged 18)		(United States) University of Tampa
2	DF	Al Smith	6 October 1962 (aged 18)		(United States) Wichita Wings
3	DF	Chris Hundelt	7 June 1963 (aged 18)		(United States) SIU Edwardsville Cougars
4	DF	Jay Ainslie	13 September 1961 (aged 20)		(United States) Chicago Sting
5	DF	Tom Gardiner	19 September 1962 (aged 19)		(United States) Philadelphia Fever
6	MF	George Fernandez	29 October 1961 (aged 19)		(United States) Cal State Hayward Pioneers
7	FW	**Tom Kain**	7 January 1963 (aged 18)		(United States) Duke Blue Devils
8	MF	Keith Meyer	21 September 1961 (aged 20)		(United States) New York Cosmos
9	FW	Dave Lischner	18 December 1962 (aged 18)		(United States) Philadelphia Fever
10	MF	Todd Saldana	15 November 1962 (aged 18)		(United States) Los Angeles Aztecs
11	FW	Darryl Gee	6 June 1963 (aged 18)		(United States) New York Cosmos
12	FW	Mark Devey	6 June 1963 (aged 18)		(United States) Moravian Academy
13	MF	Daryl Doran	29 March 1963 (aged 18)		(United States) Saint Louis Louis Billikens
14	MF	**John Stollmeyer**	25 October 1962 (aged 18)		(United States) Thomas Jefferson High School
15	FW	Peter Jianette	11 February 1963 (aged 18)		(United States) New York Arrows
16	FW	Steve McLean	31 October 1961 (aged 19)		(United States) Philadelphia Textile
17	FW	**Amr Aly**	8 January 1962 (aged 19)		(United States) Columbia Lions
18	GK	Mark White	5 December 1961 (aged 19)		(United States) Philadelphia Fever

== Group B ==
=== Brazil ===
Head coach: Vavá

No.	Pos.	Player	Date of birth (age)	Caps	Club
1	GK	Pereira	8 February 1962 (aged 19)		(Brazil) Atlético Mineiro
2	DF	Luiz Antônio	25 September 1961 (aged 20)		(Brazil) São Bento
3	DF	**Mauro Galvão**	19 December 1961 (aged 19)		(Brazil) Internacional
4	DF	**Paulo Roberto**	27 January 1962 (aged 19)		(Brazil) Grêmio
5	DF	**Júlio César**	8 March 1963 (aged 18)		(Brazil) Guarani
6	MF	**Nelsinho**	31 December 1962 (aged 18)		(Brazil) São Paulo
7	FW	Cacau	20 November 1962 (aged 18)		(Brazil) Goiás
8	MF	**Josimar**	19 September 1961 (aged 20)		(Brazil) Botafogo
9	FW	Marcelo	19 February 1963 (aged 18)		(Brazil) Guarani
10	MF	Leomir	18 December 1961 (aged 19)		(Brazil) Coritiba
11	FW	Djalma Bahia	9 April 1962 (aged 19)		(Brazil) Matsubara
12	GK	Bourguignon	26 April 1962 (aged 19)		(Brazil) Atlético Mineiro
13	MF	Partala	25 September 1962 (aged 19)		(Brazil) Matsubara
14	MF	Paulo César	5 June 1963 (aged 18)		(Brazil) Grêmio
15	MF	**Geovani**	6 April 1964 (aged 17)		(Brazil) Desportiva Capixaba
16	FW	Ronaldo	14 March 1962 (aged 19)		(Brazil) Flamengo
17	FW	Pedro Verdum	20 August 1963 (aged 18)		(Brazil) Internacional
18	GK	Brigatti	14 March 1964 (aged 17)		(Brazil) Ponte Preta

=== Italy ===
Head coach: Italo Acconcia

No.	Pos.	Player	Date of birth (age)	Caps	Club
1	GK	Carlo Riccetelli	2 January 1962 (aged 19)		(Italy) Empoli
2	DF	Pasquale Bruno	9 June 1962 (aged 19)		(Italy) Lecce
3	MF	Andrea Icardi	14 June 1963 (aged 18)		(Italy) Milan
4	MF	Andrea Manzo	5 November 1961 (aged 19)		(Italy) Sampdoria
5	DF	**Riccardo Ferri**	20 August 1963 (aged 18)		(Italy) Internazionale
6	DF	Domenico Progna	7 August 1963 (aged 18)		(Italy) Lecce
7	DF	Pietro Mariani	9 June 1962 (aged 19)		(Italy) Torino
8	MF	Giovanni Koetting	10 March 1962 (aged 19)		(Italy) SPAL
9	FW	**Giuseppe Galderisi**	22 March 1963 (aged 18)		(Italy) Juventus
10	MF	Francesco Mileti	27 May 1962 (aged 19)		(Italy) Lecce
11	FW	Gianfranco Cinello	8 April 1962 (aged 19)		(Italy) Udinese
12	GK	Giulio Drago	25 June 1962 (aged 19)		(Italy) Juventus
13	DF	Roberto Fontanini	29 May 1962 (aged 19)		(Italy) Monza
14	DF	**Ubaldo Righetti**	1 March 1963 (aged 18)		(Italy) Roma
15	MF	Marcello Gamberini	10 October 1961 (aged 19)		(Italy) Catania
16	DF	Fausto Pari	15 September 1962 (aged 19)		(Italy) Parma
17	MF	Dario Donà	17 September 1961 (aged 20)		(Italy) Lanerossi Vicenza
18	FW	Nicola Coppola	1 October 1962 (aged 19)		(Italy) Reggina

=== South Korea ===
Head coach: Park Jong-Hwan

No.	Pos.	Player	Date of birth (age)	Caps	Club
1	GK	**Choi In-Young**	5 March 1962 (aged 19)		(South Korea) Seoul Metropolitan Government
2	DF	Kim Man-Kil	4 January 1962 (aged 19)		(South Korea) Seoul Physical Education High School
3	DF	Choi Jong-Hak	10 May 1962 (aged 19)		(South Korea) Seoul National University
4	MF	Jun Jong-Son	15 February 1962 (aged 19)		(South Korea) Seoul Metropolitan Government
5	DF	Yoon Yong-Seung	8 January 1962 (aged 19)		(South Korea) Kyung Hee University
6	MF	Kim Sung-Ki	21 November 1961 (aged 19)		(South Korea) Hanyeong High School
7	GK	Lee Joo-Han	27 April 1962 (aged 19)		(South Korea) Paichai High School
8	DF	Kang Yong-Kook	17 November 1961 (aged 19)		(South Korea) Yanggok High School
9	MF	Kim Kyung-Ho	22 March 1963 (aged 18)		(South Korea) POSCO
10	MF	Jun Kwang-Woon	10 September 1961 (aged 20)		(South Korea) Chungnam National University
11	MF	Kang Deuk-Soo	16 August 1961 (aged 20)		(South Korea) Yonsei University
12	MF	Kim Sam-Soo	8 February 1963 (aged 18)		(South Korea) Daejeon Commercial High School
13	FW	**Choi Soon-Ho**	10 January 1962 (aged 19)		(South Korea) POSCO
14	FW	Kim Suk-Won	7 November 1961 (aged 19)		(South Korea) Korea University
15	FW	Baek Chi-Soo	3 September 1962 (aged 19)		(South Korea) Hanyang University
16	FW	Choi Chul-Hee	3 October 1962 (aged 19)		(South Korea) Dong-A University
17	FW	Lee Kyung-Nam	14 November 1961 (aged 19)		(South Korea) Shinheung High School
18	FW	Kwak Sung-Ho	24 December 1961 (aged 19)		(South Korea) Moonil High School

=== Romania ===
Head coach: Constantin Cernăianu

No.	Pos.	Player	Date of birth (age)	Caps	Club
1	GK	Iosif Lovas	7 May 1962 (aged 19)		(Romania) UTA Arad
2	DF	Gheorghe Viscreanu	19 August 1961 (aged 20)		(Romania) Sport Club Bacău
3	DF	**Ioan Andone**	15 March 1960 (aged 21)		(Romania) Corvinul Hunedoara
4	DF	**Augustin Eduard**	1 August 1962 (aged 19)		(Romania) Argeș Pitești
5	DF	**Mircea Rednic**	9 April 1962 (aged 19)		(Romania) Corvinul Hunedoara
6	MF	Costel Ilie	19 September 1961 (aged 20)		(Romania) ASA Târgu Mureș
7	FW	Dorel Zamfir	30 September 1961 (aged 20)		(Romania) Dinamo București
8	MF	**Gavril Balint**	3 January 1963 (aged 18)		(Romania) Steaua București
9	FW	Stere Sertov	15 February 1963 (aged 18)		(Romania) Steaua București
10	MF	Mihăiță Hanghiuc	7 November 1961 (aged 19)		(Romania) FCM Galați
11	FW	**Romulus Gabor**	14 October 1961 (aged 19)		(Romania) Corvinul Hunedoara
12	GK	Constantin Gârjoabă	18 June 1963 (aged 18)		(Romania) Progresul București
13	DF	Marin Matei	5 October 1961 (aged 19)		(Romania) Olt Scornicești
14	DF	Doru Vuscan	19 November 1962 (aged 18)		(Romania) UTA Arad
15	DF	Cornel Fâșic	29 May 1962 (aged 19)		(Romania) Sport Club Bacău
16	MF	Decebal Balaur	26 December 1961 (aged 19)		(Romania) Argeș Pitești
17	FW	Mircea Bolba	31 October 1961 (aged 19)		(Romania) ASA Târgu Mureș
18	MF	Horațiu Lasconi	8 April 1963 (aged 18)		(Romania) Jiul Petroșani

== Group C ==
=== Egypt ===
Head coach: Hany Moustafa

No.	Pos.	Player	Date of birth (age)	Caps	Club
1	GK	Mohamed Ashour	12 October 1961 (aged 19)		(Egypt) Al-Masry
2	DF	Moustafa Abouldahab	15 December 1961 (aged 19)		(Egypt) Al-Ahly
3	DF	Khaled El Amshati	22 January 1964 (aged 17)		(Egypt) El-Mansoura
4	MF	Mohamed Helmy	29 October 1962 (aged 18)		(Egypt) Al-Zamalek
5	DF	Osama Abbas	6 February 1962 (aged 19)		(Egypt) Al-Ahly
6	DF	**Hamada Sedki**	25 August 1961 (aged 20)		(Egypt) El Minya SC
7	MF	Hisham Saleh	4 May 1962 (aged 19)		(Egypt) El-Mokawloon El-Arab
8	MF	Khamis Hassan	1 March 1963 (aged 18)		(Egypt) Al-Ittihad Alexandria
9	FW	**Tarek Soliman**	24 January 1962 (aged 19)		(Egypt) Al-Masry
10	FW	Khaled El Kamash	23 May 1962 (aged 19)		(Egypt) Al-Ismaily
11	DF	Atef El Sayed	15 March 1962 (aged 19)		(Egypt) Al-Ittihad Alexandria
12	FW	**Taher Abouzeid**	10 April 1962 (aged 19)		(Egypt) Al-Ahly
13	DF	Hisham Berto	1 March 1962 (aged 19)		(Egypt) Smouha SC
14	MF	**Alaa Mayhoub**	9 January 1962 (aged 19)		(Egypt) Al-Ahly
15	MF	Sherif El Kashab	25 September 1961 (aged 20)		(Egypt) Ghazl El-Mahalla
16	DF	Mohammed Hasheesh	25 October 1962 (aged 18)		(Egypt) Al-Ahly
17	GK	Mohamed Hozain	21 April 1962 (aged 19)		(Egypt) Al-Ittihad Alexandria
18	GK	Fawzi El Tawil	2 December 1961 (aged 19)		(Egypt) Al-Zamalek

=== Mexico ===
Head coach: Alfonso Portugal

No.	Pos.	Player	Date of birth (age)	Caps	Club
1	GK	**Adrián Chávez**	27 June 1962 (aged 19)		(Mexico) Atlético Español
2	DF	Francisco Chávez	4 October 1958 (aged 22)		(Mexico) Atlas
3	DF	**Aarón Aguirre**	8 January 1959 (aged 22)		(Mexico) Coyotes Neza
4	DF	Luis Dominguez	12 August 1962 (aged 19)		(Mexico) America
5	DF	**Raúl Servín**	29 April 1963 (aged 18)		(Mexico) Pumas UNAM
6	DF	Ángel Martínez	1 May 1963 (aged 18)		(Mexico) Atlético Español
7	MF	Carlos Muñoz	8 September 1962 (aged 19)		(Mexico) La Laguna
8	MF	José Curiel	11 December 1962 (aged 18)		(Mexico) Atletas Campesinos
9	FW	José Luis Herrera	17 October 1962 (aged 18)		(Mexico) Deportivo Neza
10	FW	Agustín Coss	23 May 1962 (aged 19)		(Mexico) Atlético Español
11	FW	Ildefonso Ríos	23 January 1962 (aged 19)		(Mexico) La Laguna
12	GK	Silvino Escobedo	26 January 1961 (aged 20)		(Mexico) Cruz Azul
13	MF	Gonzalo Farfán	25 February 1961 (aged 20)		(Mexico) Atlante
14	MF	José María Guillén	18 April 1962 (aged 19)		(Mexico) Guadalajara
15	MF	Ramón Pereda	6 February 1962 (aged 19)		(Mexico) Cruz Azul
16	FW	José Enrique Vaca	15 May 1962 (aged 19)		(Mexico) Atlético Español
17	FW	José Antonio Alonso	11 September 1962 (aged 19)		(Mexico) Atlético Español
18	MF	Gerardo Coría	12 July 1962 (aged 19)		(Mexico) Pumas UNAM

=== Spain ===
Head coach: Chus Pereda

No.	Pos.	Player	Date of birth (age)	Caps	Club
1	GK	Fernando Peralta	15 August 1961 (aged 20)		(Spain) Málaga
2	DF	Alberto Vallina	11 November 1961 (aged 19)		(Spain) Sporting Gijón
3	DF	Jorge Fabregat	4 December 1961 (aged 19)		(Spain) Terrassa
4	DF	Narcís Julià	24 April 1963 (aged 18)		(Spain) Gerona
5	MF	**Francisco López**	1 November 1962 (aged 18)		(Spain) Sevilla
6	MF	José Manuel Lacalle	30 April 1962 (aged 19)		(Spain) Real Sociedad
7	FW	Alfonso Martínez	2 February 1962 (aged 19)		(Spain) Castilla
8	MF	Reces Casero	20 March 1962 (aged 19)		(Spain) Hércules
9	FW	Chano	18 August 1961 (aged 20)		(Spain) Cádiz
10	FW	Sebastián Nadal	3 October 1963 (aged 18)		(Spain) Atlético Madrid B
11	FW	Chalo	1 March 1962 (aged 19)		(Spain) Tenerife
12	MF	**Roberto Marina**	28 August 1961 (aged 20)		(Spain) Atlético Madrid B
13	MF	José Ramón Romo	12 October 1963 (aged 17)		(Spain) Real Betis
14	MF	Tolo Ocaña	2 August 1961 (aged 20)		(Spain) Albacete
15	GK	Manuel Ruiz	3 December 1962 (aged 18)		(Spain) Jerez
16	DF	Javi Rodríguez	28 August 1962 (aged 19)		(Spain) Real Valladolid
17	DF	Francis Rodríguez	28 December 1962 (aged 18)		(Spain) Real Madrid
18	DF	Antonio Iriarte	5 March 1962 (aged 19)		(Spain) Barcelona

=== West Germany ===
Head coach: Dietrich Weise

No.	Pos.	Player	Date of birth (age)	Caps	Club
1	GK	Rüdiger Vollborn	12 February 1963 (aged 18)		(West Germany) Bayer Leverkusen
2	DF	Helmut Winklhofer	27 August 1961 (aged 20)		(West Germany) Bayern Munich
3	DF	Anton Schmidkunz	3 January 1963 (aged 18)		(West Germany) 1860 Munich
4	DF	Michael Nushöhr	14 August 1962 (aged 19)		(West Germany) 1. FC Saarbrücken
5	MF	Martin Trieb	23 September 1961 (aged 20)		(West Germany) Eintracht Frankfurt
6	MF	**Michael Zorc**	25 August 1962 (aged 19)		(West Germany) Borussia Dortmund
7	MF	Thomas Brunner	10 August 1962 (aged 19)		(West Germany) 1. FC Nürnberg
8	FW	Holger Anthes	9 August 1962 (aged 19)		(West Germany) Eintracht Frankfurt
9	FW	Thomas Herbst	5 October 1962 (aged 18)		(West Germany) Bayern Munich
10	DF	Ralf Loose	5 January 1963 (aged 18)		(West Germany) Borussia Dortmund
11	FW	**Roland Wohlfarth**	11 January 1963 (aged 18)		(West Germany) MSV Duisburg
12	GK	Rainer Wilk	22 November 1963 (aged 17)		(West Germany) Arminia Bielefeld
13	MF	Alfred Schön	13 January 1962 (aged 19)		(West Germany) Waldhof Mannheim
14	MF	Ingo Aulbach	5 August 1962 (aged 19)		(West Germany) Viktoria Aschaffenburg
15	MF	Ralf Sievers	30 October 1961 (aged 19)		(West Germany) Lüneburger SK
16	FW	Axel Brummer	25 November 1961 (aged 19)		(West Germany) 1. FC Kaiserslautern
17	MF	Bernhard Scharold	20 September 1962 (aged 19)		(West Germany) Hamburger SV
18	FW	Martin Hermann	14 January 1963 (aged 18)		(West Germany) 1. FC Nürnberg

== Group D ==
=== Argentina ===
Head coach: Roberto Saporiti

No.	Pos.	Player	Date of birth (age)	Caps	Club
1	GK	**Sergio Goycochea**	17 October 1963 (aged 17)		(Argentina) Defensores Unidos
2	DF	Sergio Giovagnoli	23 February 1962 (aged 19)		(Argentina) Newell's Old Boys
3	DF	Jorge Gordillo	27 January 1962 (aged 19)		(Argentina) River Plate
4	DF	José Eduardo Alul	22 April 1963 (aged 18)		(Argentina) Gimnasia y Esgrima Jujuy
5	MF	**Gerardo Martino**	20 November 1962 (aged 18)		(Argentina) Newell's Old Boys
6	DF	Gustavo Paredes	19 March 1962 (aged 19)		(Argentina) Instituto de Córdoba
7	FW	Juan Ramón Comas	2 October 1962 (aged 19)		(Argentina) Patronato de Parana
8	FW	**Jorge Burruchaga**	9 October 1962 (aged 18)		(Argentina) Arsenal de Sarandí
9	MF	Enrique Borrelli	8 April 1962 (aged 19)		(Argentina) Chacarita Juniors
10	MF	Claudio Morresi	30 April 1962 (aged 19)		(Argentina) Huracán
11	MF	Carlos Mendoza	13 January 1962 (aged 19)		(Argentina) Unión de Santa Fe
12	GK	Sergio Genaro	12 July 1962 (aged 19)		(Argentina) Boca Juniors
13	DF	**Néstor Clausen**	29 September 1962 (aged 19)		(Argentina) Independiente
14	MF	Cayetano Palermo	27 August 1961 (aged 20)		(Argentina) Huracán
15	MF	**Carlos Tapia**	20 August 1962 (aged 19)		(Argentina) River Plate
16	FW	**Juan José Urruti**	24 May 1962 (aged 19)		(Argentina) Racing de Córdoba
17	FW	**Claudio García**	24 August 1963 (aged 18)		(Argentina) Huracán
18	MF	Jorge Cecchi	15 May 1963 (aged 18)		(Argentina) Boca Juniors

=== Australia ===
Head coach: Les Scheinflug

No.	Pos.	Player	Date of birth (age)	Caps	Club
1	GK	Glen Ahearn	13 February 1962 (aged 19)		(Australia) Sydney City
2	DF	**Robert Wheatley**	17 May 1962 (aged 19)		(Australia) Blacktown City
3	FW	Howard Tredinnick	23 February 1962 (aged 19)		(Australia) Newcastle KB United
4	DF	Steven Blair	28 December 1961 (aged 19)		(Australia) South Melbourne
5	MF	**Oscar Crino**	9 August 1962 (aged 19)		(Australia) Australian Institute of Sport
6	MF	**Paul Kay**	18 May 1962 (aged 19)		(Australia) Wollongong City
7	FW	**Ian Hunter**	10 August 1961 (aged 20)		(Australia) Marconi Fairfield
8	MF	**Peter Raskopoulos**	22 February 1962 (aged 19)		(Australia) Sydney Olympic
9	FW	**David Mitchell**	13 June 1962 (aged 19)		(Australia) Adelaide City
10	MF	Grant Lee	19 October 1961 (aged 19)		(Australia) Sydney City
11	FW	Fabio Incantalupo	30 December 1963 (aged 17)		(Australia) Melbourne Juventus
12	DF	David Skeen	13 January 1962 (aged 19)		(Australia) St. George
13	DF	**Brett Woods**	4 April 1963 (aged 18)		(Australia) Sydney City
14	MF	**Mark Koussas**	9 January 1963 (aged 18)		(Australia) Sydney Olympic
15	MF	Jim Patikas	18 October 1963 (aged 17)		(Australia) Sydney City
16	MF	Dennis Colusso	2 November 1961 (aged 19)		(Australia) Marconi Fairfield
17	MF	John Little	14 April 1962 (aged 19)		(Australia) Preston Makedonia
18	GK	Dennis Ivanac	29 June 1963 (aged 18)		(Australia) Australian Institute of Sport

=== Cameroon ===
Head coach: (Socialist Federal Republic of Yugoslavia) Radivoje Ognjanović

No.	Pos.	Player	Date of birth (age)	Caps	Club
1	GK	Pierre Yombo	8 October 1961 (aged 19)		(Cameroon) Canon Yaounde
2	GK	Mathias Ebongué	28 April 1962 (aged 19)		(Cameroon) Bamboutos FC
3	DF	Jules Denis Onana	12 June 1964 (aged 17)		(Cameroon) Canon Yaounde
4	DF	Sunday Nji	24 October 1961 (aged 19)		(Cameroon) Tiko United
5	MF	André Kopla	20 December 1961 (aged 19)		(Cameroon) Unisport de Bafang
6	DF	Omer Nyamsi	9 September 1962 (aged 19)		(Cameroon) Union Douala
7	DF	Gaston Kwedi	12 February 1962 (aged 19)		(Cameroon) Aigle Royal
8	DF	Stéphane Macky	2 April 1962 (aged 19)		(Cameroon) Danay FC
9	FW	Michel Wamba	11 September 1961 (aged 20)		(Cameroon) Unisport de Bafang
10	MF	**Ernest Ebongue**	15 May 1962 (aged 19)		(Cameroon) Tonnerre Yaoundé
11	FW	**Bonaventure Djonkep**	20 August 1961 (aged 20)		(Cameroon) Union Douala
12	FW	**Alain Eyobo**	17 October 1961 (aged 19)		(Cameroon) Dynamo Douala
13	DF	Hermann Kingué	21 September 1961 (aged 20)		(Cameroon) Aigle Royal
14	MF	Alexandre Belinga	25 August 1962 (aged 19)		(Cameroon) Tiko United
15	FW	**Bertin Ollé Ollé**	18 October 1963 (aged 17)		(Cameroon) Tonnerre Yaoundé
16	MF	**Louis-Paul Mfédé**	26 February 1961 (aged 20)		(Cameroon) Canon Yaoundé
17	MF	David Dibongué	18 October 1961 (aged 19)		(Cameroon) Bamboutos FC
18	DF	Engelbert Mbarga	31 October 1962 (aged 18)		(Cameroon) Canon Yaounde

=== England ===
Head coach: John Cartwright

No.	Pos.	Player	Date of birth (age)	Caps	Club
1	GK	Mark Kendall	12 October 1961 (aged 19)		(England) Aston Villa
2	MF	Paul Allen	28 August 1962 (aged 19)		(England) West Ham United
3	DF	Neil Banfield	20 January 1962 (aged 19)		(England) Crystal Palace
4	MF	Geoff Dey	11 January 1964 (aged 17)		(England) Sheffield United
5	MF	John Cooke	25 April 1962 (aged 19)		(England) Sunderland
6	DF	Phil Crosby	9 November 1962 (aged 18)		(England) Grimsby Town
7	MF	Tony Finnigan	17 October 1962 (aged 18)		(England) Fulham
8	DF	Colin Greenall	30 December 1963 (aged 17)		(England) Blackpool
9	FW	Steve Kinsey	2 January 1963 (aged 18)		(England) Manchester City
10	FW	Ian Muir	5 May 1963 (aged 18)		(England) Queens Park Rangers
11	MF	Kevin Gage	21 April 1964 (aged 17)		(England) Wimbledon
12	MF	Andy Peake	1 November 1961 (aged 19)		(England) Leicester City
13	GK	Andy Gosney	8 November 1963 (aged 17)		(England) Portsmouth
14	MF	Stewart Robson	6 November 1964 (aged 16)		(England) Arsenal
15	DF	Peter Southey	4 January 1962 (aged 19)		(England) Tottenham Hotspur
16	FW	Mike Small	2 February 1962 (aged 19)		(England) Luton Town
17	FW	**Danny Wallace**	21 January 1964 (aged 17)		(England) Southampton
18	MF	**Neil Webb**	14 January 1963 (aged 18)		(England) Reading
