= Sebastián López =

Sebastián López may refer to:

- Sebastián López (footballer, born September 1985), Argentine goalkeeper
- Sebastián López (footballer, born October 1985), Argentine midfielder
- Sebastián López Serrano (born 1961), Spanish footballer known as Chano
