= 2014 Campeonato Baiano =

Campeonato Baiano de Futebol
- Season: 2013
- Champions: Bahia
- Relegated: Juazeiro; Botafogo de Salvador
- Copa do Brasil: Bahia; Jacuipense; Vitória
- Série D: Jacuipense
- Copa do Nordeste: Bahia; Vitória; Serrano
- Matches played: 76
- Goals scored: 233 (3.07 per match)
- Top goalscorer: Tiago Alagoano (Jacuipense) - 12 goals

The 2014 Campeonato Baiano de Futebol was the 110th season of Bahia's top professional football league. The competition began on January 8 and ended on April 13. Bahia won the championship by the 45th time, while Juazeiro and Botafogo de Salvador were relegated.

== Format ==
In the first stage, all teams except those who are playing in the Copa do Nordeste, play against each other in a single round-robin. The worst 2 teams are relegated, and the best five advance to the second stage. The five teams are joined by the three from the Copa Nordeste.

The eight teams are split in two groups, and play against the teams in the other group twice (home and away). The two best from each team advance to the final stage, where they face in the semifinals and then the finals.

== Participating teams ==
Club	Home city	2013 result
Bahia	Salvador	2nd
Bahia de Feira	Feira de Santana	5th
Botafogo de Salvador	Salvador	7th
Catuense	Catu	2nd (2nd division)
Feirense	Feira de Santana	8th
Galícia	Salvador	1st (2nd division)
Jacuipense	Riachão do Jacuípe	9th
Juazeiro	Juazeiro	4th
Juazeirense	Juazeiro	3rd
Serrano	Vitória da Conquista	10th
Vitória	Salvador	1st
Vitória da Conquista	Vitória da Conquista	6th

== First stage ==
Pos	Team	Pld	W	D	L	GF	GA	GD	Pts	Qualification or relegation
1	Serrano (A)	8	5	1	2	14	9	+5	16	Advances to the Second stage
2	Jacuipense (A)	8	4	4	0	13	5	+8	16	Advances to the Second stage
3	Juazeirense (A)	8	4	3	1	15	13	+2	15	Advances to the Second stage
4	Galícia (A)	8	4	2	2	13	5	+8	14	Advances to the Second stage
5	Catuense (A)	8	3	3	2	15	10	+5	12	Advances to the Second stage
6	Bahia de Feira	8	1	5	2	7	9	−2	8	
7	Feirense	8	1	2	5	11	18	−7	5	
8	Juazeiro (R)	8	1	2	5	7	15	−8	5	Relegated
9	Botafogo de Salvador (R)	8	1	2	5	9	20	−11	5	Relegated

(A) Advance to a further round; (R) Relegated

=== Results ===
Home \ Away	BAF	BOT	CAT	FEI	GAL	JAC	JUA	JSE	SER
Bahia de Feira		1–0			0–2	0–0		1–2	
Botafogo de Salvador			2–2	0–4				2–3	3–1
Catuense	1–1			4–0		0–0	4–2		
Feirense	1–1				1–4	1–3		3–3	
Galícia		4–0	1–2			0–0			1–2
Jacuipense		4–1					3–1	2–2	1–0
Juazeiro	1–1	1–1		1–0	0–1				
Juazeirense			2–1		0–0		3–1		0–3
Serrano	2–2		2–1	2–1			2–0		

Legend: Blue = home team win; Yellow = draw; Red = away team win.

== Second stage ==
=== Group 2 ===
Pos	Team	Pld	W	D	L	GF	GA	GD	Pts	Qualification
1	Vitória (A)	8	6	1	1	18	8	+10	19	Advances to the Final stage
2	Vitória da Conquista (A)	8	3	3	2	18	11	+7	12	Advances to the Final stage
3	Galícia	8	3	3	2	11	8	+3	12	
4	Jacuipense	8	2	2	4	14	13	+1	8	

Rules for classification: 1) points; 2) goal difference; 3) number of goals scored.
(A) Advance to a further round

=== Group 3 ===
Pos	Team	Pld	W	D	L	GF	GA	GD	Pts	Qualification
1	Bahia (A)	8	5	2	1	13	8	+5	17	Advances to the Final stage
2	Serrano (A)	8	2	1	5	7	20	−13	7	Advances to the Final stage
3	Juazeirense	8	1	3	4	12	15	−3	6	
4	Catuense	8	1	3	4	8	18	−10	6	

Rules for classification: 1) points; 2) goal difference; 3) number of goals scored.
(A) Advance to a further round

=== Results ===
Home \ Away	BAH	CAT	GAL	JAC	JSE	SER	VIT	VCO
Bahia			1–2	2–1			2–0	1–1
Catuense			0–0	3–3			1–3	0–5
Galícia	1–2	3–0			1–0	1–1		
Jacuipense	0–1	1–3			1–1	5–0		
Juazeirense			2–2	1–0			1–2	1–2
Serrano			2–1	2–3			1–4	1–0
Vitória	1–1	2–0			3–2	3–0		
Vitória da Conquista	2–3	1–1			4–4	3–0		

Legend: Blue = home team win; Yellow = draw; Red = away team win.

== Semifinals ==
Team 1	Agg.	Team 2	1st leg	2nd leg
Vitória da Conquista	1–8	Vitória	1–2	0–6
Serrano	1–2	Bahia	1–1	0–1

== Finals ==
April 6, 2014
16:00 UTC−4

Bahia	2–0	Vitória
Anderson Talisca 38'; Fahel 79'

Arena Fonte Nova, Salvador
Attendance: 32,049
Referee: Wilton Sampaio

April 13, 2014
16:00 UTC−4

Vitória	2-2	Bahia
Juan 57' (pen.); Ayrton 74'		Fahel 20'; Lincoln 42'

Estádio de Pituaçu, Salvador
Attendance: 22,364
Referee: Péricles Bassols

Bahia won 4–2 on aggregate.
