= 2002–03 Xerez CD season =

Xerez CD
2002–03 season
- Manager: Bernd Schuster (until June); Manuel Ruiz (interim)
- Stadium: Estadio Municipal de Chapín
- Segunda División: 6th
- Copa del Rey: Round of 16
- Top goalscorer: League: Antonio Calle (13); All: Antonio Calle (13)
- Biggest win: Xerez 4–1 Oviedo; Numancia 1–4 Xerez
- Biggest defeat: Almería 6–0 Xerez

The 2002–03 Xerez CD season was the club's 56th season in existence and the second consecutive season in the second division of Spanish football. In addition to the domestic league, Xerez participated in this season's edition of the Copa del Rey. The season covered the period from 1 July 2002 to 30 June 2003.

== Competitions ==
=== Overview ===
Competition	First match	Last match	Starting round	Final position	Record							
Competition	First match	Last match	Starting round	Final position	Pld	W	D	L	GF	GA	GD	Win %
Segunda División	31 August 2002	28 June 2003	Matchday 1	6th	0	0	0	0	0	0	+0	—
Copa del Rey	11 September 2002	15 January 2003	Round of 64	Round of 16	3	2	0	1	4	4	+0	66.67
Total					3	2	0	1	4	4	+0	66.67

Source: Competitions

=== Segunda División ===
==== League table ====
Pos	Team	Pld	W	D	L	GF	GA	GD	Pts
4	Levante	42	16	17	9	59	44	+15	65
5	Las Palmas	42	16	16	10	53	43	+10	64 (Note: XER 2–2 LPA; LPA 4–0 XER)
6	Xerez	42	17	13	12	55	53	+2	64
7	Salamanca	42	14	18	10	44	32	+12	60
8	Tenerife	42	13	18	11	53	39	+14	57

Source: LFP - Liga Adelante
Rules for classification: 1st points; 2nd head-to-head points; 3rd head-to-head goal difference; 4th head-to-head goals scored; 5th goal difference; 6th number of goals scored; 7th Fair-play points

==== Results summary ====
Overall								Home						Away					
Pld	W	D	L	GF	GA	GD	Pts	W	D	L	GF	GA	GD	W	D	L	GF	GA	GD
42	17	13	12	55	53	+2	64	9	8	4	33	25	+8	8	5	8	22	28	−6

==== Results by round ====
Round	1	2	3	4	5	6	7	8	9	10	11	12	13	14	15	16	17	18	19	20	21	22	23	24	25	26	27	28	29	30	31	32	33	34	35	36	37	38	39	40	41	42
Ground	A	H	H	A	H	A	H	A	H	A	H	A	H	A	H	A	H	A	H	A	H	H	A	A	H	A	H	A	H	A	H	A	H	A	H	A	H	A	H	A	H	A
Result	W	D	W	W	W	L	L	W	W	D	D	L	L	W	D	L	L	L	D	W	D	W	L	D	D	D	W	D	W	D	W	W	D	W	W	L	L	L	D	L	W	W
Position	4	6	3	2	1	1	4	2	1	1																																

A = Away; H = Home; W = Win; D = Draw; L = Loss

==== Matches ====
31 August 2002 1	Elche	0–1	Xerez	Elche
CEST (UTC+2)

15 September 2002 2	Xerez	2–2	Las Palmas	Jerez
CEST (UTC+2)				Stadium: Estadio Municipal de Chapín

22 September 2002 3	Xerez	1–0	Sporting Gijón	Jerez
CEST (UTC+2)				Stadium: Estadio Municipal de Chapín

28 September 2002 4	Leganés	1–2	Xerez	Leganés
CEST (UTC+2)

5 October 2002 5	Xerez	1–0	Albacete	Jerez
CEST (UTC+2)				Stadium: Estadio Municipal de Chapín

12 October 2002 6	Polideportivo Ejido	2–0	Xerez	El Ejido
CEST (UTC+2)

20 October 2002 7	Xerez	0–1	Salamanca	Jerez
CEST (UTC+2)				Stadium: Estadio Municipal de Chapín

27 October 2002 8	Córdoba	1–3	Xerez	Córdoba
CEST (UTC+2)

2 November 2002 9	Xerez	2–1	Levante	Jerez
CEST (UTC+2)				Stadium: Estadio Municipal de Chapín

10 November 2002 10	Murcia	1–1	Xerez	Murcia
CEST (UTC+2)

17 November 2002 11	Xerez	1–1	Tenerife	Jerez
CEST (UTC+2)				Stadium: Estadio Municipal de Chapín

24 November 2002 12	Racing Ferrol	2–1	Xerez	Ferrol
CEST (UTC+2)

1 December 2002 13	Xerez	0–1	Compostela	Jerez
CEST (UTC+2)				Stadium: Estadio Municipal de Chapín

7 December 2002 14	Oviedo	1–2	Xerez	Ferrol
CEST (UTC+2)

15 December 2002 15	Xerez	0–0	Getafe	Jerez
CEST (UTC+2)				Stadium: Estadio Municipal de Chapín

22 December 2002 16	Zaragoza	1–0	Xerez	Zaragoza
CEST (UTC+2)

4 January 2003 17	Xerez	1–2	Almería	Jerez
CEST (UTC+2)				Stadium: Estadio Municipal de Chapín

12 January 2003 18	Eibar	1–0	Xerez	Eibar
CEST (UTC+2)

18 January 2003 19	Xerez	2–2	Terrassa	Jerez
CEST (UTC+2)				Stadium: Estadio Municipal de Chapín

26 January 2003 20	Badajoz	0–1	Xerez	Badajoz
CEST (UTC+2)

2 February 2003 21	Xerez	2–2	Numancia	Jerez
CEST (UTC+2)				Stadium: Estadio Municipal de Chapín

9 February 2003 22	Xerez	2–1	Elche	Jerez
CEST (UTC+2)				Stadium: Estadio Municipal de Chapín

15 February 2003 23	Las Palmas	4–0	Xerez	Las Palmas
CEST (UTC+2)

22 February 2003 24	Sporting Gijón	1–1	Xerez	Gijón
CEST (UTC+2)

2 March 2003 25	Xerez	2–2	Leganés	Jerez
CEST (UTC+2)				Stadium: Estadio Municipal de Chapín

9 March 2003 26	Albacete	0–0	Xerez	Albacete
CEST (UTC+2)

16 March 2003 27	Xerez	2–1	Polideportivo Ejido	Jerez
CEST (UTC+2)				Stadium: Estadio Municipal de Chapín

23 March 2003 28	Salamanca	1–1	Xerez	Salamanca
CEST (UTC+2)

29 March 2003 29	Xerez	1–0	Córdoba	Jerez
CEST (UTC+2)				Stadium: Estadio Municipal de Chapín

6 April 2003 30	Levante	0–0	Xerez	Valencia
CEST (UTC+2)

13 April 2003 31	Xerez	2–0	Murcia	Jerez
CEST (UTC+2)				Stadium: Estadio Municipal de Chapín

20 April 2003 32	Tenerife	1–3	Xerez	Santa Cruz de Tenerife
CEST (UTC+2)

27 April 2003 33	Xerez	1–1	Racing Ferrol	Jerez
CEST (UTC+2)				Stadium: Estadio Municipal de Chapín

3 May 2003 34	Compostela	0–1	Xerez	Santiago de Compostela
CEST (UTC+2)

10 May 2003 35	Xerez	4–1	Oviedo	Jerez
CEST (UTC+2)				Stadium: Estadio Municipal de Chapín

18 May 2003 36	Getafe	2–1	Xerez	Getafe
CEST (UTC+2)

25 May 2003 37	Xerez	1–3	Zaragoza	Jerez
CEST (UTC+2)				Stadium: Estadio Municipal de Chapín

31 May 2003 38	Almería	6–0	Xerez	Almería
CEST (UTC+2)

8 June 2003 39	Xerez	1–1	Eibar	Jerez
CEST (UTC+2)				Stadium: Estadio Municipal de Chapín

15 June 2003 40	Terrassa	2–0	Xerez	Terrassa
CEST (UTC+2)

21 June 2003 41	Xerez	5–3	Badajoz	Jerez
CEST (UTC+2)				Stadium: Estadio Municipal de Chapín

28 June 2003 42	Numancia	1–4	Xerez	Soria
CEST (UTC+2)

=== Copa del Rey ===
11 September 2002 Round of 64	Cacereño	0–2	Xerez	Cáceres
CEST (UTC+2)

6 November 2002 Round of 32	Xerez	2–0	Málaga	Jerez
CET (UTC+1)				Stadium: Estadio Municipal de Chapín
