= 2014 Campeonato Paraibano =

Campeonato Paraibano de Futebol
- Season: 2014
- Champions: Botafogo-PB
- Relegated: Queimadense and Sport Campina
- Copa do Brasil: Campinense and Botafogo-PB
- Série D: Campinense
- Copa do Nordeste: Campinense and Botafogo-PB
- Matches played: 230
- Goals scored: 353 (1.53 per match)
- Top goalscorer: 17 goals (Carlinhos, Santa Cruz-PB)
- Biggest home win: Campinense 6–1 Sport Campina, Round 2, 16 January 2014
- Biggest away win: Sport Campina 0–9 CSP, Round 9, 9 February 2014
- Highest scoring: 9 goals (Sport Campina 0–9 CSP, Round 9, 9 February 2014)
- Longest winning run: 4 (Auto Esporte)
- Longest unbeaten run: 18 (Sousa)
- Longest winless run: 14 (Sport Campina)
- Longest losing run: 13 (Sport Campina)

The 2014 Campeonato Paraibano de Futebol was the 104th edition of Paraíba's top professional football league. The competition ran from 12 January to 29 June. The champions, for the 27th time, were Botafogo-PB.

== Format ==
The competition retained the same format as 2013, being divided into three stages.

In the first stage, the eight teams faced each other home and away for a total of 14 games. The bottom two teams were relegated to the second division. The top two teams in this stage automatically qualified for the final stage. Campinense and Treze were exempted from this phase due to their involvement in Copa do Nordeste.

In the second stage, Botafogo-PB and Treze joined the six remaining teams from the first stage, and the eight teams faced each other home and away for a total of 14 games. The top two teams from this stage, who had not already qualified from the first stage, qualified for the final stage.

In the final stage, the four teams played each other in a semi-final over two legs (winner of first stage vs second best qualifier of second stage; best qualifier of second stage vs runner up of first stage). The winners played each other in a final over two legs.

=== Qualification ===
The champions qualified to participate in the 2016 Copa do Brasil. The best placed team (other than Botafogo-PB) qualified to participate in the 2015 Campeonato Brasileiro Série D. The champions and vice champions qualified to participate in the 2016 Copa do Nordeste.

== Participating teams ==
On 11 November 2013, the Paraíba Football Federation announced that Esporte and Nacional, the two clubs from Patos, had withdrawn from the competition due to financial concerns. As a result, the teams finishing third and fourth in the 2013 Second Division - Queimadense and Sport Campina - were included in the competition.

Club	Home city	2013 result
Atlético Cajazeirense	Cajazeiras	5th
Auto Esporte	João Pessoa	6th
Botafogo-PB	João Pessoa	1st
Campinense	Campina Grande	4th
CSP	João Pessoa	3rd
Queimadense	Queimadas	3rd (2nd division)
Santa Cruz-PB	Santa Rita	2nd (2nd division)
Sousa	Sousa	8th
Sport Campina	Campina Grande	4th (2nd division)
Treze	Campina Grande	2nd

== First stage ==
=== Standings ===
Pos	Team	Pld	W	D	L	GF	GA	GD	Pts	Qualification
1	CSP	14	8	5	1	34	15	+19	29	Qualification for Final stage
2	Auto Esporte	14	9	1	4	23	14	+9	28	Qualification for Final stage
3	Sousa	14	7	7	0	23	10	+13	28	Qualification for Second stage
4	Campinense	14	7	5	2	29	12	+17	26	Qualification for Second stage
5	Santa Cruz-PB	14	4	3	7	20	19	+1	15	Qualification for Second stage
6	Atlético Cajazeirense	14	4	3	7	18	25	−7	15	Qualification for Second stage
7	Queimadense	14	1	7	6	9	17	−8	10	Relegated to Second Division
8	Sport Campina	14	0	1	13	10	54	−44	1	Relegated to Second Division

Updated to match(es) played on 16 March 2014. Source:
Rules for classification: 1) points; 2) wins; 3) goal difference; 4) number of goals scored; 5) least red cards; 6) least yellow cards; 7) Seeding by FPF

== Second stage ==
=== Standings ===
Pos	Team	Pld	W	D	L	GF	GA	GD	Pts	Qualification
1	Campinense	14	8	4	2	23	11	+12	28	Qualification for Final stage
2	Botafogo-PB	14	8	3	3	26	14	+12	27	Qualification for Final stage
3	Sousa	14	7	4	3	22	14	+8	25	
4	Treze	14	6	4	4	22	14	+8	22	
5	Atlético Cajazeirense	14	5	2	7	21	29	−8	17	
6	Auto Esporte	14	4	4	6	19	19	0	16	
7	CSP	14	4	2	8	18	25	−7	14	
8	Santa Cruz-PB	14	2	1	11	18	40	−22	7	

Updated to match(es) played on 11 June 2014. Source:
Rules for classification: 1) points; 2) wins; 3) goal difference; 4) number of goals scored; 5) least red cards; 6) least yellow cards; 7) Seeding by FPF

== Final stage ==
Semi Final
Botafogo-PB	2	3	5
CSP	1	1	2
Campinense	2	1	3
Auto Esporte	0	2	2

Final
Botafogo-PB	3	0	3
Campinense	0	0	0
