= 2014 in Brazilian football =

Football in Brazil
- Season: 2014

Men's football
- Série A: Cruzeiro
- Série B: Joinville
- Série C: Macaé
- Série D: Tombense
- Copa do Brasil: Atlético Mineiro

The following article presents a summary of the 2014 football (soccer) season in Brazil, which was the 113th season of competitive football in the country.

== Campeonato Brasileiro Série A ==
The 2014 Campeonato Brasileiro Série A started on April 19, 2014, and concluded on December 7, 2014.

- Atlético Mineiro
- Atlético Paranaense
- Bahia
- Botafogo
- Chapecoense
- Corinthians
- Coritiba
- Criciúma
- Cruzeiro
- Figueirense
- Flamengo
- Fluminense
- Goiás
- Grêmio
- Internacional
- Palmeiras
- Santos
- São Paulo
- Sport
- Vitória

Pos	Team	Pld	W	D	L	GF	GA	GD	Pts	Qualification or relegation
1	Cruzeiro (C)	38	24	8	6	67	38	+29	80	2015 Copa Libertadores group stage
2	São Paulo	38	20	10	8	59	40	+19	70	2015 Copa Libertadores group stage
3	Internacional	38	21	6	11	53	41	+12	69	2015 Copa Libertadores group stage
4	Corinthians	38	19	12	7	49	31	+18	69	2015 Copa Libertadores first stage
5	Atlético Mineiro	38	17	11	10	51	38	+13	62	2015 Copa Libertadores group stage (Note: Atlético Mineiro has a berth guaranteed to the second stage as the 2014 Copa do Brasil champions.)
6	Fluminense	38	17	10	11	61	42	+19	61	2015 Copa do Brasil round of 16 (Note: Because neither of Brazilian teams won the 2014 Copa Libertadores, an additionally berth to the 2015 Copa do Brasil round of 16 was given to the best non-qualified to 2015 Copa Libertadores, the sixth-placed Fluminense.)
7	Grêmio	38	17	10	11	36	24	+12	61	2015 Copa Sudamericana second stage (Note: Teams that will entry in 2015 Copa Sudamericana if they do not reach 2015 Copa do Brasil round of 16. Also the 2014 Copa Verde champion (Brasília FC) and the 2015 Copa do Nordeste champion (Ceará) have a berth guaranteed.)
8	Atlético Paranaense	38	15	9	14	43	42	+1	54	2015 Copa Sudamericana second stage
9	Santos	38	15	8	15	42	35	+7	53	2015 Copa Sudamericana second stage
10	Flamengo	38	14	10	14	46	47	−1	52	2015 Copa Sudamericana second stage
11	Sport	38	14	10	14	36	46	−10	52	2015 Copa Sudamericana second stage
12	Goiás	38	13	8	17	38	40	−2	47	2015 Copa Sudamericana second stage
13	Figueirense	38	13	8	17	37	47	−10	47	
14	Coritiba	38	12	11	15	42	45	−3	47	
15	Chapecoense	38	11	10	17	39	44	−5	43	
16	Palmeiras	38	11	7	20	34	59	−25	40	
17	Vitória (R)	38	10	8	20	37	54	−17	38	Relegation to 2015 Campeonato Brasileiro Série B
18	Bahia (R)	38	9	10	19	31	43	−12	37	Relegation to 2015 Campeonato Brasileiro Série B
19	Botafogo (R)	38	9	7	22	31	48	−17	34	Relegation to 2015 Campeonato Brasileiro Série B
20	Criciúma (R)	38	7	11	20	28	56	−28	32	Relegation to 2015 Campeonato Brasileiro Série B

Updated to match(es) played on unknown. Source: Soccerway.com
Rules for classification: 1) points; 2) wins; 3) goal difference; 4) goals scored; 5) head-to-head results; 6) least red cards received; 7) least yellow cards received; 8) draw.
(C) Champions; (R) Relegated
Notes:

Cruzeiro won the Campeonato Brasileiro Série A.

=== Relegation ===
The four worst placed teams, which are Vitória, Bahia, Botafogo and Criciúma, were relegated to the following year's second level.

== Campeonato Brasileiro Série B ==
The 2014 Campeonato Brasileiro Série B started on April 19, 2014 and concluded on November 29, 2014.

- ABC
- América (MG)
- América (RN)
- Atlético Goianiense
- Avaí
- Boa Esporte
- Bragantino
- Ceará
- Icasa
- Joinville
- Luverdense
- Náutico
- Oeste
- Paraná
- Ponte Preta
- Portuguesa
- Sampaio Corrêa
- Santa Cruz
- Vasco da Gama
- Vila Nova

Pos	Team	Pld	W	D	L	GF	GA	GD	Pts	Promotion or relegation
1	Joinville (P, C)	38	21	7	10	54	33	+21	70	Promotion to 2015 Série A
2	Ponte Preta (P)	38	19	12	7	61	38	+23	69	Promotion to 2015 Série A
3	Vasco da Gama (P)	38	16	15	7	50	36	+14	63	Promotion to 2015 Série A
4	Avaí (P)	38	18	8	12	47	40	+7	62	Promotion to 2015 Série A
5	América-MG	38	20	7	11	59	39	+20	61 (Note: América-MG deducted 6 points for lining up an irregular player)	
6	Boa Esporte	38	18	5	15	51	48	+3	59	
7	Atlético Goianiense	38	17	8	13	54	49	+5	59	
8	Ceará	38	16	9	13	58	53	+5	57	
9	Santa Cruz	38	14	13	11	51	38	+13	55	
10	Sampaio Corrêa	38	13	14	11	54	46	+8	53	
11	Paraná	38	13	12	13	45	43	+2	51	
12	Luverdense	38	15	5	18	40	46	−6	50	
13	Náutico	38	14	8	16	40	47	−7	50	
14	ABC	38	14	6	18	34	40	−6	48	
15	Oeste	38	12	12	14	39	48	−9	48	
16	Bragantino	38	13	7	18	45	55	−10	46	
17	América-RN (R)	38	12	7	19	44	53	−9	43	Relegation to 2015 Série C
18	Icasa (R)	38	11	10	17	34	43	−9	43	Relegation to 2015 Série C
19	Vila Nova (R)	38	10	2	26	35	70	−35	32	Relegation to 2015 Série C
20	Portuguesa (R)	38	4	13	21	29	59	−30	25	Relegation to 2015 Série C

Updated to match(es) played on 15 November 2014. Source: CBF
Rules for classification: 1st points; 2nd wins; 3rd goal difference; 4th goals scored; 5th head-to-head results; 6th least red cards received; 7th least yellow cards received; 8th draw.
(C) Champions; (P) Promoted; (R) Relegated
Notes:

Joinville won the Campeonato Brasileiro Série B.

=== Promotion ===
The four best placed teams, which are Joinville, Ponte Preta, Vasco da Gama and Avaí, were promoted to the following year's first level.

=== Relegation ===
The four worst placed teams, which are América (RN), Icasa, Vila Nova and Portuguesa, were relegated to the following year's third level.

== Campeonato Brasileiro Série C ==
The 2014 Campeonato Brasileiro Série C started on April 26, 2014, and concluded on November 23, 2014.

- Águia de Marabá
- ASA de Arapiraca
- Botafogo-PB
- Caxias
- CRAC
- CRB
- Cuiabá
- Duque de Caxias
- Fortaleza
- Guarani
- Guaratinguetá
- Juventude
- Macaé
- Madureira
- Mogi Mirim
- Paysandu
- Salgueiro
- São Caetano
- Treze
- Tupi

The Campeonato Brasileiro Série C final was played between Oeste and Icasa.

November 15, 2014

Macaé	1–1	Paysandu

Moacyrzão

November 22, 2014

Paysandu	3–3	Macaé

Mangueirão

Macaé won the league after beating Paysandu on goal difference.

=== Promotion ===
The four best placed teams, which are Macaé, Paysandu, Mogi Mirim and CRB, were promoted to the following year's second level.

=== Relegation ===
The four worst placed teams, which are São Caetano, Treze, CRAC and Duque de Caxias, were relegated to the following year's fourth level.

== Campeonato Brasileiro Série D ==
The 2014 Campeonato Brasileiro Série D started on July 19, 2014 and concluded on November 16, 2014.

- Anapolina
- Ariquemes
- Atlético Acreano
- Baraúnas
- Boavista
- Brasil de Pelotas
- Brasiliense
- Cabofriense
- Campinense
- CENE
- Central
- Confiança
- Coruripe
- Estrela do Norte
- Globo
- Goianésia
- Grêmio Barueri
- Guarani de Palhoça
- Guarany de Sobral
- Interporto
- Ipatinga
- Ituano
- Jacuipense
- Londrina
- Luziânia
- Maringá
- Metropolitano
- Moto Club
- Operário de Várzea Grande
- Pelotas
- Penapolense
- Porto
- Princesa do Solimões
- Remo
- Rio Branco
- Ríver
- São Raimundo-RR
- Santos-AP
- Tombense
- Villa Nova
- Vitória da Conquista

The Campeonato Brasileiro Série D final was played between Brasil de Pelotas and Tombense.

November 9, 2014

Brasil de Pelotas	0–0	Tombense

Estádio Bento Freitas

November 16, 2014

Tombense	0–0	Brasil de Pelotas
Penalties
	4–2

Estádio Soares de Azevedo

Tombense won the league after beating Brasil de Pelotas 4-2 on penalties.

=== Promotion ===
The four best placed teams, which are Tombense, Brasil de Pelotas, Confiança and Londrina, were promoted to the following year's third level.

== Copa do Brasil ==
The 2014 Copa do Brasil started on February 19, 2014, and concluded on November 26, 2014. The Copa do Brasil final was played between Atlético Mineiro and Cruzeiro.

November 12, 2014

Atlético Mineiro	2–0	Cruzeiro

Independência

November 26, 2014

Cruzeiro	0–1	Atlético Mineiro

Mineirão

Atlético Mineiro won the cup by aggregate score of 3–0.

== State championship champions ==
State	Champion
(Acre (state)) Acre	Rio Branco
Alagoas	Coruripe
Amapá	Santos-AP
(Amazonas (Brazilian state)) Amazonas	Nacional
Bahia	Bahia
Ceará	Ceará
(Federal District (Brazil)) Distrito Federal	Luziânia
Espírito Santo	Estrela do Norte
Goiás	Atlético Goianiense
Maranhão	Sampaio Corrêa
Mato Grosso	Cuiabá
Mato Grosso do Sul	CENE
Minas Gerais	Cruzeiro
Pará	Remo
Paraíba	Botafogo-PB
(Paraná (state)) Paraná	Londrina
Pernambuco	Sport
Piauí	Ríver Atlético Clube
(Rio de Janeiro (state)) Rio de Janeiro	Flamengo
Rio Grande do Norte	América-RN
Rio Grande do Sul	Internacional
Rondônia	Vilhena
Roraima	São Raimundo-RR
(Santa Catarina (state)) Santa Catarina	Figueirense
(São Paulo (state)) São Paulo	Ituano
Sergipe	Confiança
Tocantins	Interporto

== Youth competition champions ==
Competition	Champion
Campeonato Brasileiro Sub-20	Corinthians
Copa do Brasil Sub-17^{(1)}	Atlético Mineiro
Copa do Brasil Sub-20	Internacional
Copa Nacional do Espírito Santo Sub-17^{(1)}	Red Bull
Copa Rio Sub-17	Fluminense
Copa Santiago de Futebol Juvenil	Internacional
Copa São Paulo de Futebol Júnior	Santos
Copa Sub-17 de Promissão	Cruzeiro
Taça Belo Horizonte de Juniores	América (MG)

^{(1)} The Copa Nacional do Espírito Santo Sub-17, between 2008 and 2012, was named Copa Brasil Sub-17. The similar named Copa do Brasil Sub-17 is organized by the Brazilian Football Confederation and it was first played in 2013.

== Other competition champions ==
Competition	Champion
Campeonato Paulista do Interior	Penapolense
Copa Espírito Santo	Real Noroeste
Copa FGF	Lajeadense
Copa do Nordeste	Sport
Copa Paulista de Futebol	Santo André
Copa Rio	Resende
Copa Verde	Brasília

== Brazilian clubs in international competitions ==
Team	2014 Copa Libertadores	2014 Copa Sudamericana	2014 Recopa Sudamericana
Atlético Mineiro	Round of 16 eliminated by (Colombia) Atlético Nacional	N/A	Champions defeated (Argentina) Lanús
Atlético Paranaense	Eliminated in the Second Stage	N/A	N/A
Bahia	N/A	Round of 16 eliminated by (Peru) Univ. César Vallejo	N/A
Botafogo	Eliminated in the Second Stage	N/A	N/A
Criciúma	N/A	Second Stage eliminated by (Brazil) São Paulo	N/A
Cruzeiro	Quarterfinals eliminated by (Argentina) San Lorenzo	N/A	N/A
Flamengo	Eliminated in the Second Stage	N/A	N/A
Fluminense	N/A	Second Stage eliminated by (Brazil) Goiás	N/A
Goiás	N/A	Round of 16 eliminated by (Ecuador) Emelec	N/A
Grêmio	Round of 16 eliminated by (Argentina) San Lorenzo	N/A	N/A
Internacional	N/A	Second Stage eliminated by (Brazil) Bahia	N/A
São Paulo	N/A	Semifinals eliminated by (Colombia) Atlético Nacional	N/A
Sport Recife	N/A	Second Stage eliminated by (Brazil) Vitória	N/A
Vitória	N/A	Round of 16 eliminated by (Colombia) Atlético Nacional	N/A

== Brazil national team ==
The following table lists all the games played by the Brazilian national team in official competitions and friendly matches during 2014.

== Record ==
Type	MP	W	D	L	GF	GA
Friendly Matches	16	12	2	2	35	15
Total	16	12	2	2	35	15

=== Friendlies ===
March 5	South Africa	0–5	Brazil	Johannesburg, South Africa
14:00 (UTC–3)		Report	Oscar 10'; Neymar 41', 46', 90+1'; Fernandinho 79'	Stadium: Soccer City; Attendance: 67,616; Referee: António Caxala (Angola)

June 3	Brazil	4–0	Panama	Goiânia, Brazil
16:00 (UTC–3)	Neymar 27'; Alves 40'; Hulk 46'; Willian 73'	Report		Stadium: Serra Dourada; Attendance: 20,000; Referee: Raúl Orosco (Bolivia)

June 6	Brazil	1–0	Serbia	São Paulo, Brazil
16:00 (UTC–3)	Fred 58'	Report		Stadium: Morumbi; Attendance: 67,042; Referee: Enrique Cáceres (Paraguay)

September 5	Brazil	1–0	Colombia	Miami Gardens, United States
22:00 (UTC–3)	Neymar 83'	Report		Stadium: Sun Life Stadium; Attendance: 73,479; Referee: Dave Gantar (Canada)

September 9	Brazil	1–0	Ecuador	East Rutherford, United States
22:00 (UTC–3)	Willian 31'	Report		Stadium: MetLife Stadium; Attendance: 35,975; Referee: Edvin Jurisevic (United States)

October 14	Japan	0–4	Brazil	Kallang, Singapore
8:45 (UTC–3)		Report	Neymar 18', 48', 77', 81'	Stadium: Singapore National Stadium; Attendance: 51,577; Referee: Ahmad A'Qashah Al'Badowe (Singapore)

November 12	Turkey	0–4	Brazil	Istanbul, Turkey
16:30 (UTC–2)		Report	Neymar 20', 60'; Kaya 24' (o.g.); Willian 44'	Stadium: Atatürk Olympic Stadium; Attendance: 50,509; Referee: Ravshan Irmatov (Uzbekistan)

November 18	Austria	1–2	Brazil	Vienna, Austria
16:00 (UTC–2)	Dragović 75' (pen.)	Report	David Luiz 64'; Firmino 83'	Stadium: Ernst-Happel-Stadion; Attendance: 48,500; Referee: Willie Collum (Scotland)

=== FIFA World Cup ===
June 12 Group A	Brazil	3–1	Croatia	São Paulo, Brazil
17:00	Neymar 29', 71' (pen.); Oscar 90+1'	Report	Marcelo 11' (o.g.)	Stadium: Arena de São Paulo; Attendance: 62,103; Referee: Yuichi Nishimura (Japan)

June 17 Group A	Brazil	0–0	Mexico	Fortaleza, Brazil
16:00		Report		Stadium: Castelão; Attendance: 60,342; Referee: Cüneyt Çakır (Turkey)

June 23 Group A	Cameroon	1–4	Brazil	Brasília, Brazil
17:00	Matip 26'	Report	Neymar 17', 34'; Fred 49'; Fernandinho 84'	Stadium: Estádio Nacional Mané Garrincha; Attendance: 69,112; Referee: Jonas Eriksson (Sweden)

June 28 Round of 16	Brazil	1–1 (a.e.t.) (3–2 p)	Chile	Belo Horizonte, Brazil
13:00	David Luiz 18'	Report	Sánchez 32'	Stadium: Mineirão; Attendance: 57,714; Referee: Howard Webb (England)
	Penalties
	David Luiz (penalty scored); Willian (penalty missed); Marcelo (penalty scored); Hulk (penalty missed); Neymar (penalty scored)		(penalty missed) Pinilla; (penalty missed) Sánchez; (penalty scored) Aránguiz; (penalty scored) Díaz; (penalty missed) Jara

July 4 Quarter-finals	Brazil	2–1	Colombia	Fortaleza, Brazil
17:00	Silva 7'; David Luiz 69'	Report	Rodríguez 80' (pen.)	Stadium: Castelão; Attendance: 60,342; Referee: Carlos Velasco Carballo (Spain)

July 8 Semi-finals	Brazil	1–7	Germany	Belo Horizonte, Brazil
17:00	Oscar 90'	Report	Müller 11'; Klose 23'; Kroos 24', 26'; Khedira 29'; Schürrle 69', 79'	Stadium: Mineirão; Attendance: 58,141; Referee: Marco Rodríguez (Mexico)

July 12 Third place play-off	Brazil	0–3	Netherlands	Brasília, Brazil
17:00		Report	Van Persie 3' (pen.); Blind 16'; Wijnaldum 90+1'	Stadium: Estádio Nacional Mané Garrincha; Attendance: 68,034; Referee: Djamel Haimoudi (Algeria)

=== Superclásico de las Américas ===
October 11	Brazil	2–0	Argentina	Beijing, China
20:05	Tardelli 28', 64'	Report		Stadium: Beijing National Stadium; Attendance: 52,313; Referee: Fan Qi (China)

== Women's football ==
=== National team ===
The following table lists all the games played by the Brazil women's national football team in official competitions and friendly matches during 2014.

=== Friendlies ===
April 6 International friendly	Australia	0 – 1	Brazil	Brisbane, Australia
		Report		Stadium: Queensland Sport and Athletics Centre

April 9 International friendly	Australia	2 – 1	Brazil	Brisbane, Australia
		Report		Stadium: Queensland Sport and Athletics Centre

June 11 International friendly	France	0 – 0	Brazil	Remire-Montjoly, French Guiana
		Report		Stadium: Stade Municipal Dr. Edmard Lama; Referee: Stéphane Frappart (France)

June 16 International friendly	New Zealand	1 – 1	Brazil	Auckland, New Zealand
	White 86'	Report	Cristiane 43'	Stadium: Mount Smart Stadium; Referee: Anna-Marie Knightley (New Zealand)

June 19 International friendly	New Zealand	0 – 0	Brazil	Taupō, New Zealand
		Report		Stadium: Owen Delany Park; Referee: Nick Waldron (New Zealand)

August 20 International friendly	Netherlands	0 – 0	Brazil	Nijmegen, Netherlands
		Report		Stadium: Stadion de Goffert

November 26 International friendly	France	2 – 0	Brazil	Lyon, France
	Le Somme 31'; Dali 61'			Stadium: Stade de Gerland

=== South American Games ===
March 8 First Stage	Brazil	0 – 0	Uruguay	Santiago, Chile
				Stadium: Estadio Bicentenario de La Florida; Referee: María Lara Fortunato (Argentina)

March 10 First Stage	Brazil	5 – 0	Venezuela	Santiago, Chile
	Cristiane 13', 65'; Darlene 30'; Bruna 35'; Poliana 40'			Stadium: Estadio Bicentenario de La Florida

March 12 First Stage	Brazil	2 – 1	Colombia	Santiago, Chile
	Rafinha 29'; Bruna 47'		Pineda 66'	Stadium: Estadio Bicentenario de La Florida; Referee: Paola Barria (Chile)

March 14 Semifinals	Brazil	0 – 0 (3–5 p)	Argentina	Santiago, Chile
				Stadium: Estadio Bicentenario de La Florida; Referee: Viviana Muñoz (Colombia)

March 16 Third Place Playoff	Brazil	2 – 1	Venezuela	Santiago, Chile
	Bruna Benites 15'; Poliana 84'			Stadium: Estadio Bicentenario de La Florida; Referee: Barbra Bastias (Chile)

=== Copa América Femenina ===
September 12 First round	Brazil	6 – 0	Bolivia	Loja, Ecuador
19:10	Formiga 19', 73'; Andressa 30'; Darlene 51'; Thaisa 84'; Fabiana 90+2'	Report		Stadium: Estadio Federativo Reina del Cisne; Referee: Juana Delgado (Ecuador)

September 14 First round	Paraguay	1 – 4	Brazil	Ambato, Ecuador
15:10	Fleitas 9'	Report	Andressa 35'; Cristiane 45+5', 56'; Fabiana 57'	Stadium: Estadio Bellavista; Referee: Silvia Reyes (Peru)

September 18 First round	Chile	0 – 2	Brazil	Cuenca, Ecuador
19:10		Report	Maurine 22'; Cristiane 49'	Stadium: Estadio Alejandro Serrano Aguilar; Referee: Viviana Muñoz (Colombia)

September 20 First round	Brazil	0 – 2	Argentina	Azogues, Ecuador
19:10		Report	Cometti 23'; Banini 73' (pen.)	Stadium: Estadio Jorge Andrade; Referee: Gabriela Bandeira (Uruguay)

September 24 Second round	Brazil	4 – 0	Ecuador	Quito, Ecuador
15:10	Cristiane 14', 17'; Maurine 37'; Raquel 87'	Report		Stadium: Estadio Chillogallo; Referee: Yercinia Correa (Venezuela)

September 26 Second round	Brazil	6 – 0	Argentina	Sangolquí, Ecuador
18:00	Cristiane 32'; Andressa 36'; Maurine 58'; Tayla 66'; Tamires 71'; Raquel 84'	Report		Stadium: Estadio Rumiñahui; Referee: María Belén Carvajal (Chile)

September 28 Second round	Colombia	0 – 0	Brazil	Quito, Ecuador
12:10		Report		Stadium: Estadio Olímpico Atahualpa; Referee: Gabriela Bandeira (Uruguay)

=== Torneio Internacional de Brasília ===
December 10 First round	Brazil	4 – 0	Argentina	Brasília, Brazil
21:50	Debinha 14'; Formiga 41', 82'; Raquel 78'			Stadium: Estádio Mané Garrincha

December 14 First round	Brazil	3 – 2	United States	Brasília, Brazil
18:45	Marta 19', 55', 64'		Carli Lloyd 30'; Megan Rapinoe 9'	Stadium: Estádio Mané Garrincha

December 17 First round	Brazil	4 – 1	China	Brasília, Brazil
21:50	Darlene 13'; Andressinha 25'; Debinha 60'; Andressa 64' (pen.)		Ren Guixin 90+3'	Stadium: Estádio Mané Garrincha

December 21 Final	Brazil	0 – 0	United States	Brasília, Brazil
19:00				Stadium: Estádio Mané Garrincha

The Brazil women's national football team competed in the following competitions in 2014:

Competition	Performance
Copa América Femenina	Champions
South American Games	Third place
Torneio Internacional de Brasília	Champions

== Campeonato Brasileiro de Futebol Feminino ==
The 2014 Campeonato Brasileiro de Futebol Feminino started on September 10, 2014, and concluded on November 30, 2014.

The Campeonato Brasileiro de Futebol Feminino final was played between Ferroviária and Kindermann.

November 4, 2014

Kindermann	0–3	Ferroviária

November 7, 2014

Ferroviária	5–3	Kindermann

Ferroviária won the league by aggregate score of 8–3.

=== Copa do Brasil de Futebol Feminino ===
The 2014 Copa do Brasil de Futebol Feminino started on January 29, 2014 and concluded on April 15, 2014.

March 30, 2014

Ferroviária	1–0	São José

Fonte Luminosa

April 15, 2014

São José	1–0	Ferroviária
Penalties
	4–5

Estádio Joe Sanchez

Ferroviária won the cup after beating São José 5-4 on penalties.

=== Domestic competition champions ===
Competition	Champion
Campeonato Carioca	Botafogo
Campeonato Paulista	São José

=== Brazilian clubs in international competitions ===
Team	2014 Copa Libertadores Femenina	2014 International Women's Club Championship
Centro Olímpico	Eliminated in the First Stage	N/A
São José	Champions defeated (Venezuela) Caracas	Champions defeated (England) Arsenal
Vitória das Tabocas	Eliminated in the First Stage	N/A
