= Jerzy Kowalik =

Polish footballer

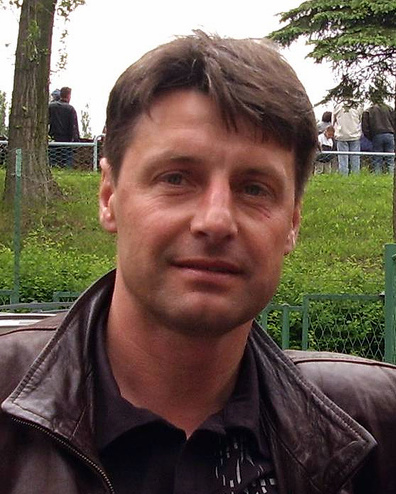

Personal information
- Date of birth: 15 October 1961 (age 65)
- Place of birth: Kraków, Poland
- Height: 1.82 m (6 ft 0 in)
- Position: Midfielder

Senior career*
Years	Team	Apps	(Gls)
1979–1983	Wisła Kraków	39	(2)
1983–1984	Szombierki Bytom	28	(3)
1984–1987	Górnik Wałbrzych	79	(10)
1990–1996	Hutnik Kraków		
1992	→ Tromsø IL (loan)	10	(2)
1998–2000	Lubań Maniowy		

International career
- Poland U18

Managerial career
- 1996–1997: Górnik Wieliczka
- 1998: Wisła Kraków
- 2000–2001: Hutnik Kraków
- 2005–2007: Kmita Zabierzów
- 2007: Zagłębie Sosnowiec
- 2008: Polonia Warsaw
- 2008: Nida Pińczów
- 2010: Kolejarz Stróże
- 2011–2012: Kmita Zabierzów
- 2013–2014: Kmita Zabierzów
- 2015: Kmita Zabierzów
- 2018: MKS Trzebinia
- 2018: Bocheński KS
Medal record
Men's football
Representing Poland
UEFA European Under-18 Championship
Runner-up	1980 East Germany
- * Club domestic league appearances and goals

Jerzy Kowalik (born 15 October 1961) is a Polish football manager and former professional player who played as a midfielder.

He was a squad member for the 1980 UEFA European Under-18 Championship and the 1981 FIFA World Youth Championship.

== Honours ==
Poland U18

- UEFA European Under-18 Championship runner-up: 1980
