= Leomir =

Brazilian footballer

Personal information
- Full name: Leomir Soares Cruz
- Date of birth: 7 April 1987 (age 39)
- Place of birth: São João de Meriti, Brazil
- Height: 1.79 m (5 ft 10 in)
- Position: Midfielder

Team information
- Current team: Jaraguá

Senior career*
| Years | Team | Apps | (Gls) |
| 2010 | Criciúma | 0 | (0) |
| 2011 | Moto Club | 0 | (0) |
| 2011 | Ituano | 0 | (0) |
| 2012 | Red Bull Brasil | 0 | (0) |
| 2012–2013 | Mirassol | 8 | (0) |
| 2013 | Mogi Mirim | 12 | (0) |
| 2014 | Botafogo-PB | 4 | (0) |
| 2015 | Marília | 0 | (0) |
| 2015 | Toledo | 0 | (0) |
| 2015 | Kukësi | 15 | (0) |
| 2016 | URT | 0 | (0) |
| 2017 | São Paulo-RS | 5 | (0) |
| 2018 | Guarani-MG | 0 | (0) |
| 2018 | CRAC | 0 | (0) |
| 2019 | Guarani-MG | 0 | (0) |
| 2019 | Bagé | 0 | (0) |
| 2020– | Jaraguá | 0 | (0) |
- * Club domestic league appearances and goals as of 02:35, 28 September 2020 (UTC)

Leomir Soares Cruz (born 7 April 1987), commonly known as Leomir, is a Brazilian footballer who plays as a midfielder for Jaraguá.

== Career ==
Leomir's career all started with Criciúma in 2010, before a move to Moto Club. His third club was Ituano, he didn't make a league appearance but did play 12 times for the club in the 2011 Campeonato Paulista; a season in-which Ituano survived relegation on goal difference. One year later, Leomir made a move to Red Bull Brasil and then Mirassol, he made his debut for the latter on 1 July 2012 against Arapongas in Série D. He went on to make seven further league appearances in his first season with Mirassol, the following season saw Leomir make 16 appearances in the club's relegation campaign in the 2013 Campeonato Paulista.

Shortly after the state championship season had ended Leomir left Mirassol to join Série C side Mogi Mirim. He made 12 appearances in Brazil's third tier before departing. After leaving Mogi Mirim, he signed for fellow Série C club Botafogo, he played in 11 matches for Botafogo over the course of 2014 in three different competitions before moving clubs once again. Leomir's next club was Marília, he made 8 appearances for the club in Campeonato Paulista before departing to make a move to Toledo and subsequently moving outside of Brazil for the first time as he agreed to sign for Albanian Superliga side Kukësi in 2015.

He participated in 15 matches between September and December for the Kukës based club. January 2016 saw Leomir leave Kukësi and return to Brazil as he signed for URT. After eight appearances in Campeonato Mineiro, he left and eventually completed a transfer to São Paulo of Série D. Leomir joined Guarani ahead of the 2018 Campeonato Mineiro II campaign. He scored on his debut in a 2–0 win away to Ipatinga. Leomir subsequently scored four goals in twelve as Guarani won promotion to the Campeonato Mineiro after defeating Uberaba on 21 April. On 5 May, Gurani won the Mineiro II title after defeating Tupynambás.

Three months later, in 2018, Leomir was on the move again as he signed for CRAC of the Campeonato Goiano lower leagues; his fourteenth senior club. They won the second tier title in September 2018, with Leomir netting two goals throughout the campaign. He rejoined Guarani in the following November ahead of the 2019 campaign. He subsequently featured nine times as they suffered relegation. Across the following twelve months, Leomir had spells with Bagé (in Divisão de Accesso) and Jaraguá (in Campeonato Goiano).

== Career statistics ==
As of 28 September 2020

Appearances and goals by club, season and competition
| Club | Season | League | | | Cup | | Continental | | Other | | Total | |
| Club | Season | Division | Apps | Goals | Apps | Goals | Apps | Goals | Apps | Goals | Apps | Goals |
|---|---|---|---|---|---|---|---|---|---|---|---|---|
| Criciúma | 2010 | Série C | 0 | 0 | 0 | 0 | — | | 0 | 0 | 0 | 0 |
| Moto Club | 2011 | Campeonato Maranhense | — | | 0 | 0 | — | | 0 | 0 | 0 | 0 |
| Ituano | 2011 | Campeonato Paulista | — | | 0 | 0 | — | | 12 | 0 | 12 | 0 |
| Red Bull Brasil | 2012 | Paulista Série A2 | — | | 0 | 0 | — | | 0 | 0 | 0 | 0 |
| Mirassol | 2012 | Série D | 8 | 0 | 0 | 0 | — | | 0 | 0 | 8 | 0 |
| Mirassol | 2013 | Campeonato Paulista | — | | 0 | 0 | — | | 16 | 2 | 16 | 2 |
| Mirassol | Total | | 8 | 0 | 0 | 0 | — | | 16 | 2 | 24 | 2 |
| Mogi Mirim | 2013 | Série C | 12 | 0 | 0 | 0 | — | | 0 | 0 | 12 | 0 |
| Botafogo | 2014 | Série C | 4 | 0 | 1 | 0 | — | | 6 (Note: Appearance(s) in the Campeonato Paraibano and Copa do Nordeste) | 0 | 11 | 0 |
| Marília | 2015 | Campeonato Paulista | — | | 0 | 0 | — | | 8 | 0 | 8 | 0 |
| Toledo | 2015 | Campeonato Paranaense | — | | 0 | 0 | — | | 0 | 0 | 0 | 0 |
| Kukësi | 2015–16 | Albanian Superliga | 15 | 0 | 4 | 2 | — | | 0 | 0 | 19 | 2 |
| URT | 2016 | Campeonato Mineiro | — | | 0 | 0 | — | | 8 | 0 | 8 | 0 |
| São Paulo | 2017 | Série D | 5 | 0 | 0 | 0 | — | | 8 (Note: Appearance(s) in the Campeonato Gaúcho) | 1 | 13 | 1 |
| Guarani | 2018 | Mineiro Módulo II | — | | 0 | 0 | — | | 14 | 4 | 14 | 4 |
| Guarani | 2019 | Campeonato Mineiro | — | | 0 | 0 | — | | 9 | 0 | 9 | 0 |
| Guarani | Total | | — | | 0 | 0 | — | | 23 | 4 | 23 | 4 |
| Jaraguá | 2020 | Campeonato Goiano | — | | 0 | 0 | — | | 7 | 0 | 7 | 0 |
| Career total | | | 44 | 0 | 5 | 2 | — | | 88 | 7 | 137 | 9 |

== Honours ==
Botafogo

- Campeonato Paraibano: 2014

Guarani

- Campeonato Mineiro Módulo II: 2018

CRAC

- Campeonato Goiano II: 2018
