= Ronaldo (footballer, born 1962) =

Brazilian footballer

Personal information
- Full name: Ronaldo Marques Sereno
- Date of birth: March 14, 1962 (age 64)
- Place of birth: Brazil
- Height: 1.84 m (6 ft 0 in)
- Position: Forward

Senior career*
Years	Team	Apps	(Gls)
1980–1983	Flamengo	32	(7)
?	?		
1994	Hyundai Horangi	21	(5)

International career
1981	Brazil U20	4	(3)
- * Club domestic league appearances and goals

Ronaldo Marques Sereno, also known as Ronaldo (born March 14, 1962, is a Brazilian former professional footballer who played as a forward. He was a member of the squad of 1981 FIFA World Youth Championship. He played for Ulsan Hyundai of the South Korean K League, then known as Hyundai Horangi.
