= Alexis Noble =

Uruguayan footballer (1963–2025)

Personal information
- Full name: Alexis Wilman Noble Rosa
- Date of birth: 5 May 1963
- Place of birth: Montevideo, Uruguay
- Date of death: 10 April 2025 (aged 61)
- Position: Forward

Youth career
- 1979: Peñarol

Senior career*
Years	Team	Apps	(Gls)
1980–1982	Peñarol	2	(0)
1982	Independiente Medellín		
1983–1985	Universidad Católica	35	(4)
1985	Nacional	9	(0)
1986–1987	San Lorenzo	19	(2)
1988	River Plate Montevideo		
1989	Peñarol		
1989	Central Español		
1990	Defensor Sporting		
1990	Sud América		
1991	Huracán Buceo		
1992	Aucas		
1993	El Tanque Sisley		
1994–1995	Basáñez		
1996	Progreso		
1997	Rampla Juniors		
1998	Cerro		
1999	Fénix		

International career
1981	Uruguay U20	9	(2)
- * Club domestic league appearances and goals

Alexis Wilman Noble Rosa (5 May 1963 – 10 April 2025) was a Uruguayan footballer who played as a forward.

== Career ==
Noble was a product of Peñarol, with whom he was from 1980 to 1982 and 1988. He also played for the classic rival, Nacional, in 1985 and 1986.

Besides Uruguay, Noble played in Colombia for Independiente Medellín, Chile for Universidad Católica, Argentina for San Lorenzo and Ecuador for Aucas.

He was part of the 1984 Universidad Católica team that won the Primera División de Chile.

At international level, Noble represented Uruguay U20 in both the 1981 South American Championship, becoming the champions, and the 1981 FIFA World Cup.

== Death ==
Noble died on 10 April 2025, at the age of 61.

== Honours ==
Universidad Católica

- Chilean Primera División: 1984
