= Tom Gardiner =

American soccer player

Personal information
- Full name: Thomas Gardiner
- Date of birth: September 19, 1962 (age 64)
- Place of birth: Hebron, Connecticut, U.S.
- Position: Defender

Youth career
- 1980: Southern Connecticut State University

Senior career*
Years	Team	Apps	(Gls)
1981–1982	Philadelphia Fever (indoor)	1	(0)

International career
- U.S. U-20
- * Club domestic league appearances and goals

Thomas Gardiner is an American retired soccer player who played professionally in the Major Indoor Soccer League and was a member of the U.S. team at the 1981 FIFA World Youth Championship.

Gardiner graduated from RHAM High School where he was an outstanding soccer player. A member of the 1977 Connecticut High School championship soccer team, he was a 1979 High School All American. In 1980, Gardiner played a single season with the Southern Connecticut State University men's soccer team before leaving the team to concentrate on preparations for the 1981 FIFA World Youth Championship. Gardiner played all three U.S. games in that tournament. In the fall of 1981, he signed with the Philadelphia Fever of the Major Indoor Soccer League but tore is medial collateral ligament after playing only one game. As he recovered from that surgery, he suffered a career ending ankle injury in 1982.

He was inducted into the Connecticut Soccer Hall of Fame in 2008.
