= List of governors of Falcón =

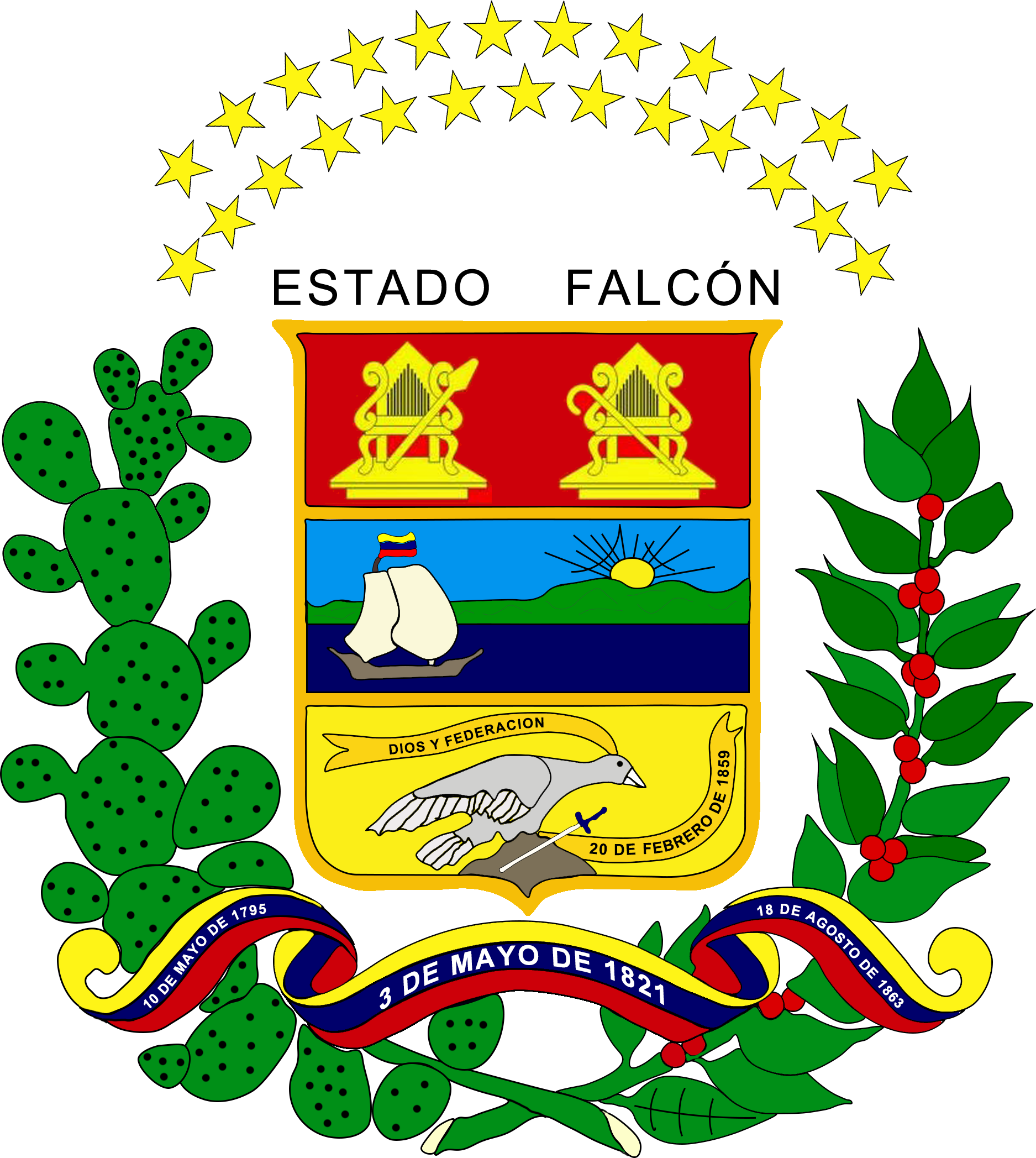
- State coat of arms

- Flag of the State
- Incumbent; Víctor José Clark
- Style: Governor
- Status: Head of State
- Term length: Four years

This is a list of governors of the Venezuelan Falcón State:

Until 1989, they were appointed by the president of Venezuela. Starting from that year they are elected in universal, direct and secret elections.

== Elected governors ==
Took office	Left office	Governor	Vote
1989	1992	Aldo Cermeño, COPEI	50.63
1992	1995	Aldo Cermeño, COPEI	51.73
1995	1998	José Curiel, COPEI	37.83
1998	2000	José Curiel, COPEI	49.97
2000	2004	Jesús Montilla, MVR	48.62
2004	2008	Jesús Montilla, MVR	59.47
2008	2012	Stella Lugo, PSUV	55.35
2012	2017	Stella Lugo, PSUV	51.58
2017	2021	Víctor Clark, PSUV	52.44
2021	2025	Víctor Clark, PSUV	42.98
2025	2029	Víctor Clark, PSUV	83.17

== See also ==
- List of Venezuela governors
- Politics of Venezuela
- History of Venezuela
