= Peter Jianette =

American soccer player

Personal information
- Date of birth: November 2, 1963 (age 62)
- Place of birth: Hicksville, New York, U.S.
- Positions: Forward; midfielder

Senior career*
Years	Team	Apps	(Gls)
1980–1983	New York Arrows (indoor)	1	(0)
1983–1984	Phoenix Pride (indoor)	34	(4)
1986–1987	New York Express (indoor)	9	(3)

International career
- U.S. U-20
- * Club domestic league appearances and goals

Peter Jianette is an American retired soccer player who played professionally in the Major Indoor Soccer League and was a member of the U.S. team at the 1981 FIFA World Youth Championship. He was inducted into the Long Island Soccer Player Hall of Fame on February 27, 2022.

Jianette graduated from Hicksville High School where he was a 1980 Dr. Pepper and Parade Magazine High School All American soccer player. He was also the 1980 Nassau County Player of the Year. In the fall of 1980, Jianette turned professional with the New York Arrows of the Major Indoor Soccer League. He remained with the Arrows for three seasons before moving to the Phoenix Pride for the 1983–1984 MISL season. He returned to the MISL when he played six games for the New York Express during the 1986–1987 season tearing his medial collateral ligament December of 86 against the Dallas Sidekicks which ended his professional soccer career.

In 1981, Jianette was a member of the United States U-20 men's national soccer team at the 1981 FIFA World Youth Championship.

Peter Jianette was drafted as the 1st round territorial pick for the New York Arrows of the MISL in 1980 and was a 3rd round pick by the NY Cosmos of the NASL draft. He signed with the NY Arrows in December 1980 during his senior year at Hicksville High School, where he had accumulated a total of 67 goals and 27 assists in just 65 games.

On February 10, 1982, Jianette made his professional debut with the Arrows and tore his ACL. He spent a total of 3 years with the club. He then signed with the Phoenix pride of the MISL. He played the 83–84 season with the Pride, where he played 34 games.

In 1981 Jianette participated in the FIFA World Youth Cup and Asian Tour. In 1985 he played for the New York Express during their inaugural season at the Nassau County Coliseum, where he led the team in scoring with 9 goals in 6 games, being named MVP of the 1st ever game with an 8–5 win over Arsenals indoor team. In 1986 the Express joined the MISL and signed a three-year contract.

In addition to his professional career, Jianette played on the United States U-16, U-17, and U-20 National Soccer Teams. He played 31 games in 14 countries on 5 continents with a total of 19 full youth international appearances. He played in 9 international tournaments from 1978 to 1982 highlighted by the FIFA U-20 World Championship in Australia.
