= Luis Amuchástegui =

Argentine footballer

Personal information
- Full name: Luis Antonio Amuchástegui
- Date of birth: December 12, 1960 (age 65)
- Place of birth: Córdoba, Argentina
- Position: Striker

Senior career*
Years	Team	Apps	(Gls)
1980–1983	Racing de Córdoba	224 total	(65)
1984	San Lorenzo	40	(6)
1985–1986	River Plate	47	(19)
1986–1987	América	22	(5)
1988–1991	Racing de Córdoba	(see above)	
1992	General Paz Juniors	?	(?)

International career
1981–1983	Argentina	3	(0)
- * Club domestic league appearances and goals as of 23 October 2007

Luis Antonio Amuchástegui (born 12 December 1960 in Córdoba) is a former Argentine footballer. He played for a number of clubs in Argentina and represented the Argentina national football team. he played over 200 games for Racing de Córdoba.

Amuchástegui started his career with Racing de Córdoba, he was an important member of the team that contested the final of the Nacional championship in 1980. In 1983, he travelled to Spain to join Valencia CF for a fee of US$300,000 but he could not acclimatise to life in Europe and returned to Argentina without signing the contract, Valencia eventually signed Juan Jose Urruti instead, and Amuchástegui spent several months without a club before joining San Lorenzo de Almagro in 1984.

After a successful season with San Lorenzo he joined River Plate where he was part of the championship winning team of 1985–1986. He then helped the club to win the Copa Libertadores in 1986.

Amuchástegui moved to Mexico in 1986 and played for América. After a few years in Mexico he returned to Argentina to play for Racing de Córdoba and then General Paz Juniors in the lower leagues. In 1992, he joined San Lorenzo for pre-season training but walked out of the club without playing a single game for them. This incident marked his retirement from professional football.

== Titles ==
River Plate

- Argentine Primera División: 1985–86
- Copa Libertadores: 1986

América

- CONCACAF Champions' Cup: 1987
