= Alexandre Belinga =

Cameroonian football coach

Personal information
- Full name: Alexandre Belinga
- Date of birth: 25 August 1962 (age 64)
- Place of birth: Cameroon

Managerial career
- Years: Team
- 2015–2016: Cameroon

Alexandre Belinga (born 25 August 1962) is a Cameroonian football coach who once coached the Cameroon national team.

As a player, he was a squad member for the 1981 FIFA World Youth Championship.
