= José Curiel =

Venezuelan politician (1937–2022)

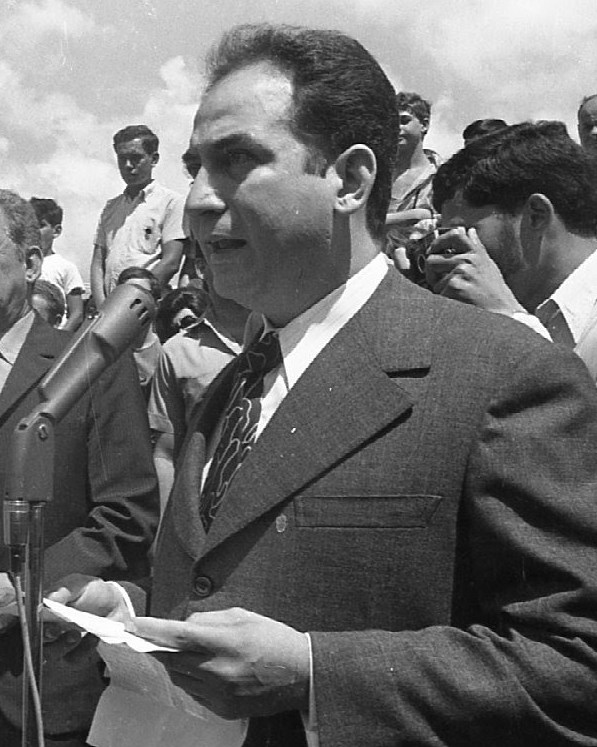
- Curiel in 1971

Governor of Falcón
- In office 1996–2000
- Preceded by: Aldo Cermeño
- Succeeded by: Jesús Montilla

Minister of Public Works
- In office 11 March 1969 – 12 March 1974

Personal details
- Born: 22 March 1937 Coro, United States of Venezuela
- Died: 8 January 2022 (aged 84) Caracas, Venezuela
- Party: Copei

José Curiel (22 March 1937 – 8 January 2022) was a Venezuelan politician. A member of Copei, he served as Governor of Falcón from 1996 to 2000. He died in Caracas on 8 January 2022, at the age of 84.
