= José Ramón Romo =

Spanish footballer

Personal information
- Full name: José Ramón González Romo
- Date of birth: 12 October 1963 (age 63)
- Place of birth: Seville, Spain
- Height: 1.70 m (5 ft 7 in)
- Position: Midfielder

Youth career
- Betis

Senior career*
Years	Team	Apps	(Gls)
1981–1989	Betis	76	(9)
1983–1984	→ Recreativo (loan)	16	(0)
1989–1991	Cádiz	27	(0)
1991–1993	Recreativo		

International career
1981–1982	Spain U18	16	(4)
1981	Spain U20	2	(0)
- * Club domestic league appearances and goals

José Ramón González Romo (born 12 October 1963) is a Spanish former footballer who played as a midfielder.

== Football career ==
Born in Seville, Romo spent his entire professional career, which lasted 12 years, in his native Andalusia. He started with local giants Real Betis in 1981, remaining eight seasons with the club but being played sparingly during his spell – only in 1985–86 did he appear on a regular basis, scoring seven goals in 25 matches for an eventual eighth-place finish; he was also loaned to Recreativo de Huelva in Segunda División before being released in 1989.

Romo then played two seasons with Cádiz CF, again in La Liga, again without much individual fortune. Before retiring in 1993 at not yet 30, he again represented Huelva, now in Segunda División B, and amassed Spanish top level totals of 103 games and nine goals.

== Post-retirement ==
After retiring, Romo worked as a bus driver in the public transport service company of Seville.
