= Roman Geszlecht =

Polish footballer

Personal information
- Date of birth: 28 December 1961 (age 64)
- Place of birth: Chorzów, Poland
- Height: 1.86 m (6 ft 1 in)
- Position: Defender

Youth career
- Chorzowianka Chorzów

Senior career*
Years	Team	Apps	(Gls)
1980–1982	Zagłębie Sosnowiec	45	(2)
1982–1983	Schalke 04	0	(0)
1983–1985	Bayer Leverkusen	49	(1)
1986	Hannover 96	18	(1)
1986–1988	FC 08 Homburg	40	(0)
1989	Rot-Weiss Essen	17	(0)
1989–1991	BV 04 Düsseldorf		
1991–1996	Rot-Weiss Essen		

International career
1981	Poland	4	(0)
- * Club domestic league appearances and goals

Roman Geszlecht (born 28 December 1961) is a Polish former professional footballer who played as a defender.

He earned four caps for the Poland national team in 1981.
