= John Cooke (footballer, born 1962) =

English footballer

Personal information
- Full name: John Cooke
- Date of birth: 25 April 1962 (age 64)
- Place of birth: Salford, England
- Height: 5 ft 8 in (1.73 m)
- Position: Right winger

Senior career*
Years	Team	Apps	(Gls)
1979–1985	Sunderland	55	(4)
1984–1985	→ Carlisle United (loan)	6	(2)
1985	Sheffield Wednesday	0	(0)
1985–1988	Carlisle United	106	(11)
1988–1990	Stockport County	58	(7)
1990–1992	Chesterfield	53	(8)
- Gateshead
- Spennymoor United
Total		278	(32)

International career
1981	England U20	3	(1)
- * Club domestic league appearances and goals

John Cooke (born 25 April 1962) is an English former professional footballer who played as a right winger.

== Career ==
Born in Salford, Cooke played for Sunderland, Carlisle United, Sheffield Wednesday, Carlisle United, Stockport County, Chesterfield, Gateshead, and Spennymoor United.

Cooke also made three appearances for England at the 1981 FIFA World Youth Championship.

He joined his former club Sunderland as kit manager in January 1994 and was still in post as of April 2020. He left the club in late 2020, with his son Jay Turner-Cooke, a Sunderland youth player, leaving the club to join rivals Newcastle United as a result.
