= Peter Southey =

English footballer

Personal information
- Full name: Peter Charles Southey
- Date of birth: 4 January 1962
- Place of birth: Parsons Green, England
- Date of death: 28 December 1983 (aged 21)
- Position: Full back

Senior career*
Years	Team	Apps	(Gls)
1979–1983	Tottenham Hotspur	1	(0)

International career
1981	England U20	2	(0)
- * Club domestic league appearances and goals

Peter Charles Southey (4 January 1962 – 28 December 1983) was an English professional footballer who played for Tottenham Hotspur.

== Playing career ==
Southey joined Tottenham Hotspur as an apprentice in October 1979. The promising full back played one senior match for the Spurs in a league match versus Brighton & Hove Albion in September 1979. Southey died from leukemia in 1983.
