= Sebastián López (footballer, born October 1985) =

Argentine footballer (born 1985)

Personal information
- Full name: Sebastián Oscar López
- Date of birth: 13 October 1985 (age 41)
- Place of birth: San Francisco Solano, Argentina
- Height: 1.80 m (5 ft 11 in)
- Position: Midfielder

Team information
- Current team: Argentino de Quilmes

Senior career*
Years	Team	Apps	(Gls)
2005–2008	Lugano	81	(11)
2008–2014	Deportivo Armenio	207	(11)
2014–2015	Deportivo Español	59	(4)
2016–2021	Deportivo Riestra	146	(3)
2022–	Argentino de Quilmes	21	(1)
- * Club domestic league appearances and goals as of 07:28, 20 August 2022 (UTC)

Sebastián Oscar López (born 13 October 1985) is an Argentine professional footballer who plays as a midfielder for Argentino de Quilmes.

== Career ==
López started his senior career with Lugano in 2005. Eleven goals arrived across eighty-one appearances in Primera D Metropolitana. In 2008, López moved up to Primera B Metropolitana with Deportivo Armenio. He scored goals against Estudiantes, Comunicaciones and Temperley in his first campaign, before netting at least once in each of the following five seasons. In total, the midfielder participated in over two hundred Primera B Metropolitana games for Deportivo Armenio. On 2 July 2014, López joined fellow third tier team Deportivo Español. In season two, López started forty of their forty-two league fixtures.

January 2016 saw López sign for Deportivo Riestra. His first goal for the club didn't arrive until match number one hundred and three versus Fénix in April 2019, in the succeeding season after their twelve-month stint in Primera B Nacional following 2016–17 promotion.

== Career statistics ==
As of 3 June 2019.

Appearances and goals by club, season and competition
Club	Season	League			Cup		League Cup		Continental		Other		Total	
Club	Season	Division	Apps	Goals	Apps	Goals	Apps	Goals	Apps	Goals	Apps	Goals	Apps	Goals
Lugano	2007–08	Primera D Metropolitana	31	5	0	0	—		—		0	0	31	5
Deportivo Armenio	2008–09	Primera B Metropolitana	34	3	0	0	—		—		0	0	34	3
Deportivo Armenio	2009–10	Primera B Metropolitana	39	2	0	0	—		—		0	0	39	2
Deportivo Armenio	2010–11	Primera B Metropolitana	25	2	0	0	—		—		0	0	25	2
Deportivo Armenio	2011–12	Primera B Metropolitana	37	1	0	0	—		—		0	0	37	1
Deportivo Armenio	2012–13	Primera B Metropolitana	38	1	3	0	—		—		0	0	41	1
Deportivo Armenio	2013–14	Primera B Metropolitana	34	2	3	0	—		—		0	0	37	1
Deportivo Armenio	Total		207	11	6	0	—		—		0	0	213	11
Deportivo Español	2014	Primera B Metropolitana	19	1	0	0	—		—		0	0	19	1
Deportivo Español	2015	Primera B Metropolitana	40	3	3	0	—		—		0	0	43	3
Deportivo Español	Total		59	4	3	0	—		—		0	0	62	4
Deportivo Riestra	2016	Primera B Metropolitana	17	0	0	0	—		—		0	0	17	0
Deportivo Riestra	2016–17	Primera B Metropolitana	29	0	0	0	—		—		5 (Note: Appearance(s) in the Primera B Metropolitana play-offs)	0	34	0
Deportivo Riestra	2017–18	Primera B Nacional	22	0	1	0	—		—		0	0	23	0
Deportivo Riestra	2018–19	Primera B Metropolitana	35	1	1	0	—		—		0	0	36	1
Deportivo Riestra	Total		103	1	2	0	—		—		5	0	110	1
Career total			400	21	11	0	—		—		5	0	416	21
