= Geoff Dey =

English footballer

Personal information
- Date of birth: 11 January 1964 (age 62)
- Place of birth: Chesterfield, England
- Position: Midfielder

Youth career
- Sheffield United

Senior career*
Years	Team	Apps	(Gls)
1981–1983	Sheffield United	0	(0)
1983–1985	Scunthorpe United	17	(1)
- Worcester City
- * Club domestic league appearances and goals

Geoff Dey (born 11 January 1964) is an English former professional footballer who played as a midfielder.

== Career ==
Dey began his career with Sheffield United, before moving to Scunthorpe United, where he made 17 appearances in the Football League. Dey later played non-league football for Worcester City.

Dey also participated at the 1981 FIFA World Youth Championship, making four appearances in the tournament.
