= 1980 UEFA European Under-18 Championship =

Tournament details
- Host country: East Germany
- Dates: 16–25 May
- Teams: 16

Final positions
- Champions: England (8th title)
- Runners-up: Poland
- Third place: Italy
- Fourth place: Netherlands

The UEFA European Under-18 Championship 1980 Final Tournament was held in East Germany. It also served as the European qualification for the 1981 FIFA World Youth Championship.

== Qualification ==
=== Group 1 ===
Teams	Pld	W	D	L	GF	GA	GD	Pts
France	4	3	1	0	8	3	+5	7
Republic of Ireland	4	1	2	1	3	4	–1	4
Belgium	4	0	1	3	3	7	–4	1

Republic of Ireland	2–1	Belgium
Belgium	2–3	France
France	2–0	Republic of Ireland
France	2–0	Belgium
Belgium	0–0	Republic of Ireland
Republic of Ireland	1–1	France

=== Other groups ===
Team 1	Agg.	Team 2	1st leg	2nd leg
Northern Ireland	2–0	Wales	2–0	0–0
Norway	5–2	Sweden	1–1	4–1
Iceland	1–5	Finland	1–3	0–2
Netherlands	3–3 (6–5p)	Scotland	2–1	1–2
Denmark	1–7	England	1–3	0–4
Luxembourg	2–11	West Germany	1–5	1–6
Portugal	5–0	Malta	3–0	2–0
Spain	5–0	Switzerland	3–0	2–0
Italy	6–2	Austria	5–1	1–1
Poland	6–0	Cyprus	5–0	1–0
Bulgaria	3–2	Czechoslovakia	2–1	1–1
Greece	2–3	Hungary	1–0	1–3
Soviet Union	0–4	Yugoslavia	0–2	0–2
Turkey	0–4	Romania	0–1	0–3

== Teams ==
The following teams qualified for the tournament:

- Bulgaria
- East Germany (host)
- England
- Finland
- France
- West Germany
- Hungary
- Italy
- Netherlands
- Northern Ireland
- Norway
- Poland
- Portugal
- Romania
- Spain
- Yugoslavia

== Group stage ==
=== Group A ===
Teams	Pld	W	D	L	GF	GA	GD	Pts
Italy	3	2	1	0	6	3	+3	5
Spain	3	2	0	1	4	2	+2	4
Norway	3	0	2	1	2	3	–1	2
Hungary	3	0	1	2	2	6	–4	1

16 May	Italy	1–0	Spain
	Norway	0–0	Hungary
18 May	Spain	2–1	Norway
	Italy	4–2	Hungary
20 May	Spain	2–0	Hungary
	Italy	1–1	Norway

=== Group B ===
Teams	Pld	W	D	L	GF	GA	GD	Pts
Netherlands	3	2	1	0	5	0	+5	5
East Germany	3	1	1	1	2	1	+1	3
France	3	1	0	2	7	5	+2	2
Bulgaria	3	1	0	2	2	10	–8	2

16 May	Bulgaria	1–0	East Germany
	Netherlands	2–0	France
18 May	Netherlands	3–0	Bulgaria
	East Germany	2–0	France
20 May	France	7–1	Bulgaria
	East Germany	0–0	Netherlands

=== Group C ===
Teams	Pld	W	D	L	GF	GA	GD	Pts
Poland	3	3	0	0	7	2	+5	6
Romania	3	2	0	1	3	2	+1	4
West Germany	3	1	0	2	8	6	+2	2
Finland	3	0	0	3	3	11	–8	0

16 May	Romania	2–1	Finland
	Poland	3–2	West Germany
18 May	Poland	1–0	Romania
	West Germany	6–2	Finland
20 May	Romania	1–0	West Germany
	Poland	3–0	Finland

=== Group D ===
Teams	Pld	W	D	L	GF	GA	GD	Pts
England	3	2	1	0	4	1	+3	5
Portugal	3	1	2	0	3	2	+1	4
Yugoslavia	3	0	2	1	3	5	–2	2
Northern Ireland	3	0	1	2	2	4	–2	1

16 May	England	1–0	Northern Ireland
	Yugoslavia	1–1	Portugal
18 May	Northern Ireland	2–2	Yugoslavia
	England	1–1	Portugal
20 May	Portugal	1–0	Northern Ireland
	England	2–0	Yugoslavia

== Semifinals ==
23 May 1980

Poland	2 – 0	Italy

Gera
23 May 1980

England	1 – 0	Netherlands

Halle

== Third place match ==
25 May 1980

Italy	3 – 0	Netherlands

Leipzig

== Final ==
25 May 1980

England	2 – 1	Poland
Allen; Gibson

Leipzig
Attendance: 8,000

1980 UEFA European Under-18 Championship

England
Eighth title

== Qualification to World Youth Championship ==
The six best performing teams qualified for the 1981 FIFA World Youth Championship: four semifinalists and the best group runners-up (based on points and goal difference).

- England
- West Germany (replaced Netherlands, declining participation)
- Italy
- Poland
- Romania (won draw against Portugal)
- Spain
