= 2015 Copa do Nordeste =

Nordestão

Tournament details
- Country: Brazil
- Dates: 3 February – 29 April
- Teams: 16

Final positions
- Champions: Ceará
- Runners-up: Bahia
- 2015 Copa Sudamericana: Ceará

Tournament statistics
- Matches played: 73
- Goals scored: 173 (2.37 per match)
- Attendance: 506,803 (6,943 per match)
- Top goal scorer(s): Max (6 goals)

The 2015 Copa do Nordeste was the 12th edition of the main football tournament featuring teams from the Brazilian Northeast Region. The competition featured 20 clubs, with Bahia and Pernambuco having three seeds each, and Ceará, Rio Grande do Norte, Sergipe, Alagoas, Paraíba, Maranhão and Piauí with two seeds each. For the first time, the competition included teams from Maranhão and Piauí.

== Qualified teams ==
Association	Team (Berth)	Entry stage
(Alagoas) Alagoas; 2 berths	Coruripe	2014 Campeonato Alagoano champions
(Alagoas) Alagoas; 2 berths	CRB	2014 Campeonato Alagoano runners-up
(Bahia) Bahia; 3 berths	Vitória	2014 Campeonato Baiano runners-up
(Bahia) Bahia; 3 berths	Bahia	2014 Campeonato Baiano champions
(Bahia) Bahia; 3 berths	Serrano	2014 Campeonato Baiano champions of the first phase
(Ceará) Ceará; 2 berths	Ceará	2014 Campeonato Cearense champions
(Ceará) Ceará; 2 berths	Fortaleza	2014 Campeonato Cearense runners-up
(Maranhão) Maranhão; 2 berths	Sampaio Corrêa	2014 Campeonato Maranhense champions
(Maranhão) Maranhão; 2 berths	Moto Club	2014 Campeonato Maranhense runners-up
(Paraíba) Paraíba; 2 berths	Botafogo	2014 Campeonato Paraibano champions
(Paraíba) Paraíba; 2 berths	Campinense	2014 Campeonato Paraibano runners-up
(Pernambuco) Pernambuco; 3 berths	Sport	2014 Campeonato Pernambucano champions
(Pernambuco) Pernambuco; 3 berths	Náutico	2014 Campeonato Pernambucano runners-up
(Pernambuco) Pernambuco; 3 berths	Salgueiro	2014 Campeonato Pernambucano 3rd place
(Piauí) Piauí; 2 berths	Ríver	2014 Campeonato Piauiense champions
(Piauí) Piauí; 2 berths	Piauí	2014 Campeonato Piauiense runners-up
(Rio Grande do Norte) Rio Grande do Norte; 2 berths	América	2014 Campeonato Potiguar champions
(Rio Grande do Norte) Rio Grande do Norte; 2 berths	Globo	2014 Campeonato Potiguar runners-up
(Sergipe) Sergipe; 2 berths	Confiança	2014 Campeonato Sergipano champions
(Sergipe) Sergipe; 2 berths	Socorrense	2014 Campeonato Sergipano runners-up

== Knockout phase ==
=== Bracket ===
Quarter-finals
(Ceará) Fortaleza	1	0	1 (2)
(Pernambuco) Sport	0	1	1 (4)
(Paraíba) Campinense	0	0	0
Bahia	0	1	1
(Pernambuco) Salgueiro	0	1	1
Ceará	2	2	4
(Rio Grande do Norte) América	0	2	2
(Bahia) Vitória	1	4	5

Semi-finals
(Pernambuco) Sport	0	2	2
Bahia	0	3	3
Ceará (a.e.t.)	0	2	2
(Bahia) Vitória	0	2	2

Finals
Bahia	0	1	1
Ceará	1	2	3

=== Quarterfinals ===
Team 1	Agg.	Team 2	1st leg	2nd leg
Sport (Pernambuco)	1–1 (4–2 p)	(Ceará) Fortaleza	0–1	1–0
Bahia	1–0	(Paraíba) Campinense	0–0	1–0
Ceará	4-1	(Pernambuco) Salgueiro	2–0	2–1
Vitória (Bahia)	5–2	(Rio Grande do Norte) América	1–0	4–2

=== Semifinals ===
Team 1	Agg.	Team 2	1st leg	2nd leg
Vitória (Bahia)	2–2 (a.e.t.)	Ceará	0–0	2–2
Bahia	3–2	(Pernambuco) Sport	0–0	3–2

=== Finals ===
22 April 2015
22:00 UTC−3

Bahia	0–1	Ceará
	Report	Ricardinho 71'

Arena Fonte Nova, Salvador
Attendance: 40,805
Referee: Pablo dos Santos Alves

29 April 2015
22:00 UTC−3

Ceará	2–1	Bahia
Charles 15'; Gilvan 51'	Report	Maxi Biancucchi 88'

Castelão, Fortaleza
Attendance: 63,399
Referee: Ítalo Medeiros de Azevedo

2015 Copa do Nordeste
Champions

Ceará
1st title

== Top scorers ==
Rank	Player	Club	Goals
1	(Brazil) Max	América de Natal	6
2	(Brazil) Kieza	Bahia	5
2	(Brazil) Magno Alves	Ceará	5
4	(Brazil) Robert	Sampaio Corrêa	4
