= Queimadas, Paraíba =

Coordinates: 7.35778°S 35.8978°W

- Municipality
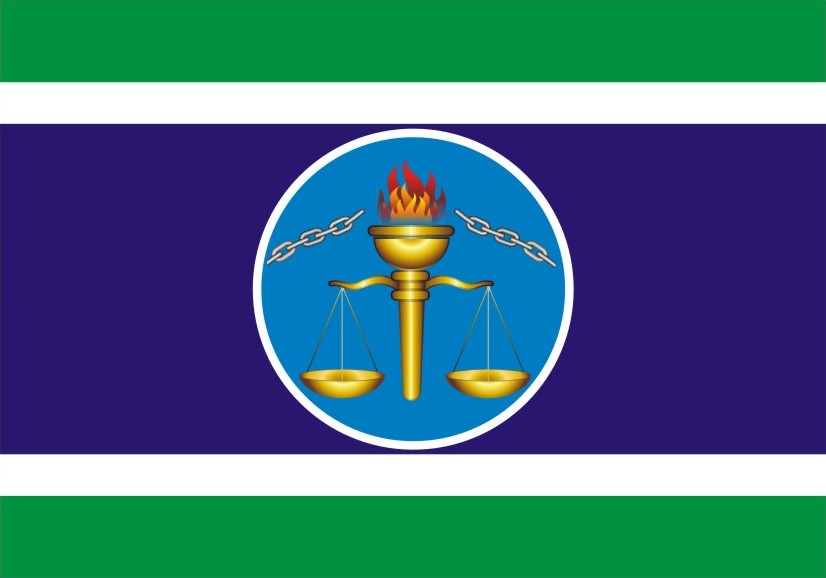
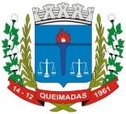
- Flag Coat of arms
- Nickname: Tataguaçu
- Interactive map of Queimadas, Paraíba
- Country: Brazil
- Region: Northeast
- State: Paraíba
- Mesoregion: Agreste Paraibano

Area
  - Total: 157.991 sq mi (409.196 km^{2})
- Elevation: 1,480 ft (450 m)

Population (2020)
  - Total: 44,179
  - Density: 259.9/sq mi (100.33/km^{2})
- Time zone: UTC−3 (BRT)
- Postal code: 58475-000
- Website: http://www.queimadas.pb.gov.br/

Queimadas (Central northeastern portuguese pronunciation: [kẽˈmɐdɐ(s)]) is a municipality in the state of Paraíba in the Northeast Region of Brazil. The town has the seventeenth GDP and is the twelfth largest city of the state.

== See also ==
- List of municipalities in Paraíba
