= Serrano Sport Club =

Serrano
- Full name: Serrano Sport Club
- Nickname(s): Mongoió; Serra; Triunfo; Rubro-Verde; Serra da Vitória
- Founded: December 22, 1979; 45 years ago
- Ground: Lomantão, Vitória da Conquista, Bahia state, Brazil
- Capacity: 12,500
- Website: http://www.serranosportclub.com.br/
Home colours

Serrano Sport Club, commonly known as Serrano, is a Brazilian football club from Vitória da Conquista, Bahia state. They competed in the Série B once.

== History ==
The club was founded on December 22, 1979. They won the Campeonato Baiano Second Level in 1992 and finishing as runners-up in the competition in 2010, gaining promotion to the Campeonato Baiano 2011. They competed in the Série B in 1987.

== Achievements ==
- Campeonato Baiano Second Level:
  - Winners (1): 1992

== Stadium ==
Serrano Sport Club play their home games at Estádio Lomanto Júnior, nicknamed Lomantão. The stadium has a maximum capacity of 12,500 people.
