= 1981 FIFA World Youth Championship =

FIFA World Youth Championship Australia 1981

Tournament details
- Host country: Australia
- Dates: 3–18 October
- Teams: 16 (from 6 confederations)
- Venues: 6 (in 6 host cities)

Final positions
- Champions: West Germany (1st title)
- Runners-up: Qatar
- Third place: Romania
- Fourth place: England

Tournament statistics
- Matches played: 32
- Goals scored: 87 (2.72 per match)
- Attendance: 443,094 (13,847 per match)
- Top scorer(s): (West Germany) Ralf Loose (West Germany) Roland Wohlfarth (Egypt) Taher Abouzaid (Australia) Mark Koussas (4 goals)
- Best player: (Romania) Romulus Gabor
- Fair play award: Australia

The 1981 FIFA World Youth Championship, the third edition of the FIFA World Youth Championship, was held in Australia from 3 to 18 October 1981. The tournament took place in across venues in Adelaide, Brisbane, Canberra, Melbourne, Newcastle and Sydney where a total of 32 matches were played. The championship winner was West Germany, who defeated Qatar 4–0 in a final held at Sydney Cricket Ground. The official mascot was the kookaburra 'Kickaburra'.

== Qualification ==
Confederation	Qualifying Tournament	Qualifier(s)
AFC (Asia)	1980 AFC Youth Championship	Qatar^{1} South Korea
CAF (Africa)	1981 African Youth Championship	Cameroon^{1} Egypt^{1}
CONCACAF (North, Central America & Caribbean)	1980 CONCACAF U-20 Tournament	Mexico; United States^{1}
CONMEBOL (South America)	1981 South American Youth Championship	Argentina; Brazil; Uruguay
OFC (Oceania)	Host nation	Australia^{1}
UEFA (Europe)	1980 UEFA European Under-18 Football Championship	England^{1} Italy; Poland; Romania^{1} Spain West Germany^{1}

1.Teams that made their debut.

== Squads ==
For a list of all squads that played in the final tournament, see 1981 FIFA World Youth Championship squads.

== Group stage ==
=== Group A ===
Pos	Team	Pld	W	D	L	GF	GA	GD	Pts	Group stage result
1	Uruguay	3	3	0	0	5	0	+5	6	Advance to knockout stage
2	Qatar	3	1	1	1	2	2	0	3	Advance to knockout stage
3	Poland	3	1	0	2	4	2	+2	2	
4	United States	3	0	1	2	1	8	−7	1	

3 October 1981
18:30

Poland	0–1	Qatar
	(Report)	Bilal 37'

Lang Park, Brisbane
Attendance: 17,200
Referee: Tony Boskovic (Australia)

3 October 1981
20:30

United States	0–3	Uruguay
	(Report)	López Báez 5'; Aguilera 60'; Da Silva 67'

Lang Park, Brisbane
Attendance: 17,200
Referee: Emilio Soriano Aladren (Spain)

6 October 1981
18:30

United States	1–1	Qatar
Devey 43'	(Report)	Bilal 56'

Lang Park, Brisbane
Attendance: 10,122
Referee: Tesfaye Gebreyesus (Ethiopia)

6 October 1981
20:30

Uruguay	1–0	Poland
Da Silva 58'	(Report)

Lang Park, Brisbane
Attendance: 10,122
Referee: Antonio Márquez Ramírez (Mexico)

8 October 1981
19:00

Qatar	0–1	Uruguay
	(Report)	Villazán 52'

Lang Park, Brisbane
Attendance: 8,264
Referee: Stanislas Kamdem (Cameroon)

8 October 1981
21:00

Poland	4–0	United States
Rzepka 17'; Kowalik 18'; Dziekanowski 65', 67'	(Report)

Lang Park, Brisbane
Attendance: 8,264
Referee: Tony Boskovic (Australia)

=== Group B ===
Pos	Team	Pld	W	D	L	GF	GA	GD	Pts	Group stage result
1	Brazil	3	2	1	0	5	1	+4	5	Advance to knockout stage
2	Romania	3	2	1	0	3	1	+2	5	Advance to knockout stage
3	South Korea	3	1	0	2	4	5	−1	2	
4	Italy	3	0	0	3	1	6	−5	0	

3 October 1981
18:30

Italy	1–4	South Korea
Mariani 83'	(Report)	Kwak Sung-ho 7'; Choi Soon-ho 12', 29'; Lee Kyung-nam 88'

Olympic Park, Melbourne
Attendance: 13,538
Referee: Gastón Castro (Chile)

3 October 1981
20:30

Romania	1–1	Brazil
Zamfir 82'	(Report)	Leomir 67'

Olympic Park, Melbourne
Attendance: 13,538
Referee: George Courtney (England)

6 October 1981
18:45

Romania	1–0	South Korea
Sertov 5'	(Report)

Olympic Park, Melbourne
Attendance: 17,500
Referee: Jorge Romero (Argentina)

6 October 1981
20:45

Brazil	1–0	Italy
Djalma Baia 56'	(Report)

Olympic Park, Melbourne
Attendance: 17,500
Referee: Jan Redelfs (West Germany)

8 October 1981
18:45

South Korea	0–3	Brazil
	(Report)	Paulo Roberto 48'; Ronaldo 61'; Jun J.S. 79' (o.g.)

Olympic Park, Melbourne
Attendance: 9,000
Referee: Hussein Fahmy Baheig (Egypt)

8 October 1981
20:45

Italy	0–1	Romania
	(Report)	Gabor 56' (pen.)

Olympic Park, Melbourne
Attendance: 9,000
Referee: Robert Valentine (Scotland)

=== Group C ===
Pos	Team	Pld	W	D	L	GF	GA	GD	Pts	Group stage result
1	West Germany	3	2	0	1	6	4	+2	4	Advance to knockout stage
2	Egypt	3	1	2	0	7	6	+1	4	Advance to knockout stage
3	Mexico	3	0	2	1	4	5	−1	2	
4	Spain	3	0	2	1	5	7	−2	2	

3 October 1981
19:00

Spain	2–2	Egypt
Chano 65'; Nadal 74'	(Report)	Abouzaid 6', 78'

Hindmarsh Stadium, Adelaide
Attendance: 7,504
Referee: Lee Woo Bong (South Korea)

3 October 1981
21:00

West Germany	1–0	Mexico
Loose 2'	(Report)

Hindmarsh Stadium, Adelaide
Attendance: 7,504
Referee: Robert Valentine (Scotland)

6 October 1981
19:00

West Germany	1–2	Egypt
Loose 35'	(Report)	Helmy 31'; Abouzaid 54'

Hindmarsh Stadium, Adelaide
Attendance: 14,120
Referee: Rómulo Méndez Molina (Guatemala)

6 October 1981
21:00

Mexico	1–1	Spain
Coss 75'	(Report)	Chano 45' (pen.)

Hindmarsh Stadium, Adelaide
Attendance: 14,120
Referee: José Martínez Bazán (Uruguay)

8 October 1981
18:30

Egypt	3–3	Mexico
Guillén 33' (o.g.); Saleh 64', 71'	(Report)	Vaca 18'; Farfán 28'; Ríos 69'

Bruce Stadium, Canberra
Attendance: 8,150
Referee: Henning Lund-Sorensen (Denmark)

8 October 1981
20:30

Spain	2–4	West Germany
F. López 72'; Fabregat 78'	(Report)	Trieb 29'; Wohlfarth 47', 85'; Anthes 55'

Bruce Stadium, Canberra
Attendance: 14,120
Referee: Arnaldo Coelho (Brazil)

=== Group D ===
Pos	Team	Pld	W	D	L	GF	GA	GD	Pts	Group stage result
1	England	3	1	2	0	4	2	+2	4	Advance to knockout stage
2	Australia (H)	3	1	2	0	6	5	+1	4	Advance to knockout stage
3	Argentina	3	1	1	1	3	3	0	3	
4	Cameroon	3	0	1	2	3	6	−3	1	

(H) Hosts
3 October 1981
13:00

England	2–0	Cameroon
Finnigan 57'; Dey 78'	(Report)

Sports Ground, Sydney
Attendance: 15,814
Referee: Toshikazu Sano (Japan)

3 October 1981
15:00

Australia	2–1	Argentina
Koussas 79'; Hunter 89'	(Report)	Morresi 66'

Sports Ground, Sydney
Attendance: 15,814
Referee: Alojzy Jarguz (Poland)

5 October 1981
15:00

Australia	3–3	Cameroon
Mitchell 9'; Koussas 53', 78' (pen.)	(Report)	Olle Olle 17'; Djonkep 35', 52'

Newcastle Stadium, Newcastle
Attendance: 13,797
Referee: Toros Kibritjian (Syria)

5 October 1981
15:00

England	1–1	Argentina
Small 79'	(Report)	Urruti 57'

Sports Ground, Sydney
Attendance: 16,674
Referee: Gianfranco Menegali (Italy)

8 October 1981
19:00

Cameroon	0–1	Argentina
	(Report)	Cecchi 6'

Sports Ground, Sydney
Attendance: 28,932
Referee: Mubarak Waleed Saeed (Qatar)

8 October 1981
21:00

England	1–1	Australia
Small 82'	(Report)	Koussas 7'

Sports Ground, Sydney
Attendance: 28,932
Referee: Ioan Igna (Romania)

== Knockout stage ==
Quarter-finals
11 October - Melbourne
Uruguay	1
Romania	2
11 October - Canberra
West Germany	1
Australia	0
11 October - Newcastle
Brazil	2
Qatar	3
11 October - Sydney
England	4
Egypt	2

Semi-finals
14 October - Melbourne
Romania	0
West Germany (a.e.t.)	1
14 October - Sydney
Qatar	2
England	1

Final
18 October - Sydney
West Germany	4
Qatar	0
Third place
17 October - Adelaide
Romania	1
England	0

=== Quarter-finals ===
11 October 1981
15:00

Uruguay	1–2	Romania
Berruetta 60'	(Report)	Gabor 25', 84'

Olympic Park, Melbourne
Attendance: 14,800
Referee: Gianfranco Menegali (Italy)

11 October 1981
15:00

Brazil	2–3	Qatar
Ronaldo 27', 78'	(Report)	Al-Muhannadi 10', 54', 87'

Newcastle Stadium, Newcastle
Attendance: 12,993
Referee: Antonio Márquez Ramírez (Mexico)

11 October 1981
15:00

West Germany	1–0	Australia
Wohlfarth 69'	(Report)

Bruce Stadium, Canberra
Attendance: 13,780
Referee: Henning Lund-Sorensen (Denmark)

11 October 1981
15:00

England	4–2	Egypt
Webb 41', 64', 82'; Cooke 60'	(Report)	Abouzaid 28' (pen.); Helmy 40'

Sports Ground, Sydney
Attendance: 8,293
Referee: José Martínez Bazán (Uruguay)

=== Semi-finals ===
14 October 1981
20:00

Qatar	2–1	England
Bilal 12'; Alsada 62'	(Report)	Small 70'

Cricket Ground, Sydney
Attendance: 12,476
Referee: Jorge Romero (Argentina)

14 October 1981
20:30

Romania	0–1 (a.e.t.)	West Germany
	(Report)	Schön 103'

Olympic Park, Melbourne
Attendance: 15,000
Referee: Robert Valentine (Scotland)

=== Third place play-off ===
17 October 1981
15:00

Romania	1–0	England
Gabor 36'	(Report)

Hindmarsh Stadium, Adelaide
Attendance: 10,492
Referee: Henning Lund-Sorensen (Denmark)

=== Final ===
18 October 1981
15:00

West Germany	4–0	Qatar
Loose 28', 66'; Wohlfarth 42'; Anthes 86'	(Report)

Cricket Ground, Sydney
Attendance: 18,531
Referee: Arnaldo Coelho (Brazil)

== Result ==
1981 World Youth Championship winners

West Germany
First title

== Awards ==
Golden Shoe	Golden Ball	Fair Play Award
(Romania) Romulus Gabor	(Romania) Romulus Gabor	Australia

== Goalscorers ==
Romulus Gabor of Romania won the Golden Boot award for scoring four goals. In total, 87 goals were scored by 56 different players, with two of them credited as own goals.

4 goals

- (Romania) Romulus Gabor
- (Australia) Mark Koussas
- (Egypt) Taher Abouzaid
- (West Germany) Ralf Loose
- (West Germany) Roland Wohlfarth

3 goals

- (Brazil) Ronaldo
- (Egypt) Hisham Saleh
- (England) Michael Small
- (England) Neil Webb
- (Qatar) Badr Bilal
- (Qatar) Khalid Salman

2 goals

- (Cameroon) Bonaventure Djonkep
- (Poland) Dariusz Dziekanowski
- (South Korea) Choi Soon-Ho
- (Spain) Chano
- (West Germany) Holger Anthes
- (Uruguay) Jorge da Silva

1 goal

- (Argentina) Claudio Morresi
- (Argentina) Jorge Cecchi
- (Argentina) Juan Jose Urruti
- (Australia) David Mitchell
- (Australia) Ian Hunter
- (Brazil) Djalma Baia
- (Brazil) Leomir
- (Brazil) Paulo Roberto
- (Cameroon) Bertin Olle Olle
- (Egypt) Mohamed Helmy
- (England) Anthony Finnigan
- (England) Geoffrey Dey
- (England) John Cooke
- (Italy) Pietro Mariani
- (Mexico) Agustín Coss
- (Mexico) González Farfán
- (Mexico) Ildefonso Ríos
- (Mexico) José Enrique Vaca
- (Poland) Piotr Rzepka
- (Poland) Jerzy Kowalik
- (Qatar) Ali Alsada
- (Romania) Augustin Eduard
- (Romania) Cornel Fisic
- (Romania) Dorel Zamfir
- (Romania) Stere Sertov
- (South Korea) Kwak Sung-Ho
- (South Korea) Lee Kyung-Nam
- (Spain) Francisco López
- (Spain) Jorge Fabregat
- (Spain) Sebastián Nadal
- (United States) Mark Devey
- (Uruguay) Carlos Berruetta
- (Uruguay) Javier López Báez
- (Uruguay) Carlos Aguilera
- (Uruguay) Jorge Villazán
- (West Germany) Alfred Schön
- (West Germany) Martin Trieb

Own goals

- (Mexico) Jose Guillen (playing against Egypt)
- (South Korea) Jun Jong-Son (playing against Brazil)

== Final ranking ==
Pos	Team	Pld	W	D	L	GF	GA	GD	Pts	Final result
1	West Germany	6	5	0	1	12	4	+8	10	Champions
2	Qatar	6	3	1	2	7	9	−2	7	Runners-up
3	Romania	6	4	1	1	6	3	+3	9	Third place
4	England	6	2	2	2	9	7	+2	6	Fourth place
5	Uruguay	4	3	0	1	6	2	+4	6	Eliminated in Quarter-finals
6	Brazil	4	2	1	1	7	4	+3	5	Eliminated in Quarter-finals
7	Australia (H)	4	1	2	1	6	6	0	4	Eliminated in Quarter-finals
8	Egypt	4	1	2	1	9	10	−1	4	Eliminated in Quarter-finals
9	Argentina	3	1	1	1	3	3	0	3	Eliminated in Group stage
10	Poland	3	1	0	2	4	2	+2	2	Eliminated in Group stage
11	South Korea	3	1	0	2	4	5	−1	2	Eliminated in Group stage
12	Mexico	3	0	2	1	4	5	−1	2	Eliminated in Group stage
13	Spain	3	0	2	1	5	7	−2	2	Eliminated in Group stage
14	Cameroon	3	0	1	2	3	6	−3	1	Eliminated in Group stage
15	United States	3	0	1	2	1	8	−7	1	Eliminated in Group stage
16	Italy	3	0	0	3	1	6	−5	0	Eliminated in Group stage

Source: rsssf.com
(H) Hosts
