= Juan José Urruti =

Argentine footballer

- Urruti in 1987

Personal information
- Full name: Juan José Urruti Acosta
- Date of birth: May 24, 1962 (age 64)
- Place of birth: Rosario, Argentina
- Position: Forward

Senior career*
Years	Team	Apps	(Gls)
1979–1983	Racing de Córdoba	82	(14)
1983–1986	Valencia	74	(8)
1986–1988	Rosario Central	35	(5)
1988–1990	Bolívar	88	(9)
1991	Platense	8	(0)
1991–1992	Bolívar		
1993–1995	Wilstermann	75	(11)
1996	San José	21	(3)
1997	Huachipato		

International career
1980	Argentina U20	4	(0)
1983	Argentina	1	(0)
- * Club domestic league appearances and goals

Juan José Urruti (born May 24, 1962) is a Argentine former professional footballer who played as a forward for a number of clubs in Argentina, Spain, Bolivia and Chile.

== Career ==
Urruti was born in Rosario. He started his professional career in 1979 with Racing de Córdoba. In 1980 Racing got to the final of the Nacional championship but eventually lost to Rosario Central.

In 1983 Urruti was signed by Valencia after a deal to buy his Racing Club teammate Luis Amuchástegui fell through at the last minute. Urruti played for Valencia until 1986, but he only managed to score 8 goals in 74 games.

In 1986 Urruti returned to Argentina to play for Rosario Central, he was part of the team that won the 1986–87 championship.

In 1988 Urruti was signed by Bolívar in Bolivia, he won two Bolivian league championships either side of a brief return to Argentina in 1991 to play for Club Atlético Platense.

In 1993 Urruti joined Jorge Wilstermann where he won another Bolivian league championship in 1994. He joined San José in 1996 and played out his career with Huachipato in Chile in 1997.

== Personal life ==
With his wife, Claudia Mussa, Urruti has a son Maximiliano who is a professional footballer and plays for New England Revolution in the MLS.

== Honours ==
Rosario Central

- Argentine Primera División: 1986–87

Bolívar

- Liga de Fútbol Profesional Boliviano: 1988, 1992

Wilstermann

- Liga de Fútbol Profesional Boliviano: 1994
