= Manuel Ruiz (footballer, born 1962) =

Spanish footballer and manager

Manolo Ruiz
Personal information
- Full name: Manuel Ruiz Pérez
- Date of birth: 3 December 1962 (age 63)
- Place of birth: Jerez de la Frontera, Spain
- Height: 1.84 m (6 ft 0 in)
- Position: Goalkeeper

Youth career
- Melilla
- Sanluqueño
- Xerez

Senior career*
Years	Team	Apps	(Gls)
1980–1983	Xerez	16	(0)
1983–1990	Zaragoza	9	(0)
1984–1986	Zaragoza B	68	(0)
1987–1988	→ Deportivo La Coruña (loan)	0	(0)
1990–1991	Levante	18	(0)
1991–1993	Estepona	69	(0)
1993–1994	Almería	28	(0)
1994–1996	Melilla	57	(0)
1996–1997	Sanluqueño		
Total		265	(0)

International career
1981	Spain U18	8	(0)

Managerial career
- 1997–2004: Xerez (assistant)
- 1999: Xerez
- 2001: Xerez
- 2003: Xerez
- 2004: Xerez
- 2004–2005: Levante (assistant)
- 2005–2007: Getafe (assistant)
- 2007–2008: Real Madrid (assistant)
- 2010–2011: Beşiktaş (assistant)
- 2015–2016: Linense
- 2017–2018: Extremadura
- 2019: El Ejido
- * Club domestic league appearances and goals

Manuel "Manolo" Ruiz Pérez (born 3 December 1962) is a Spanish retired footballer who played as a goalkeeper, and a current manager.

== Playing career ==
Ruiz was born in Jerez de la Frontera, Province of Cádiz, Andalusia. After playing youth football for UD Melilla and Atlético Sanluqueño CF, he signed for Xerez CD in 1979. Four years later, he moved to La Liga with Real Zaragoza, making his debut on 4 December 1983 in a 0–0 away draw against FC Barcelona.

During his four-year spell with the Aragonese, however, Ruiz only played in a combined nine league matches, barred by Andoni Cedrún which would later become a legendary player for the club. In 1985–86 he featured prominently for Zaragoza's reserves in Segunda División, in an eventual relegation-ending season.

Before retiring, Ruiz also played professionally for Deportivo de La Coruña – no appearances whatsoever due to a serious injury– and Levante UD, suffering another second division relegation with the latter side.

== Coaching career ==
In 1997, shortly after retiring, Ruiz started coaching, starting with his first senior team Xerez and helping the Andalusians return to the second level in 2001 after a three-year absence. Subsequently, he was part of Bernd Schuster's staff at the Estadio Municipal de Chapín (in six matches comprising two separate seasons, he would also act as an interim manager).

Schuster signed with FC Shakhtar Donetsk in 2003, and Ruiz was one of four coaches as Xerez finished ninth in the second tier. When the German returned to Spain to join Levante UD, Ruiz re-joined his coaching staff, continuing to work with him at his following clubs, Getafe CF and Real Madrid, until he was dismissed from the latter in December 2008; amongst other tasks, he was charged with designing the teams' strategic set pieces.

Ruiz started a career as manager in his own right in 2011, being linked to AD Alcorcón and CE Sabadell FC in 2013. On 24 December 2015, he was named Real Balompédica Linense coach after replacing the fired Rafael Escobar.

== Managerial statistics (second division) ==
Nat	Team	From	To	Record							
Nat	Team	From	To	G	W	L	D	Win %	GF	GA	+/-
(Spain)	Xerez	2003	2003	3	2	0	1	66.67%	9	6	+3
(Spain)	Xerez	2003	2004	3	0	1	2	0%	3	7	-4
Total Career				6	2	1	3	33.33%	12	13	-1
