= Chano (footballer, born 1961) =

Spanish footballer

Personal information
- Full name: Sebastián López Serrano
- Date of birth: 18 August 1961 (age 65)
- Place of birth: Tétouan, Morocco
- Height: 1.71 m (5 ft 7 in)
- Position: Right back

Senior career*
Years	Team	Apps	(Gls)
1978–1980	Cádiz B		
1980–1984	Cádiz	72	(1)
1984–1988	Mallorca	129	(0)
1988–1991	Málaga	90	(2)
Total		294	(3)

International career
1978–1979	Spain U18	2	(0)
1981	Spain U19	3	(1)
1981	Spain U20	4	(3)
1981–1984	Spain U21	2	(0)
- * Club domestic league appearances and goals

Sebastián López Serrano (born 18 August 1961), known as Chano, is a Spanish retired footballer who played as a right back.

He appeared in 165 La Liga games during six seasons, representing in the competition Cádiz, Mallorca and Málaga.

== Club career ==
=== Cádiz ===
Born in Tétouan, Morocco to Spanish parents, Chano made his professional debut for Cádiz CF on 13 January 1980, in a 0–2 Segunda División defeat away to Deportivo Alavés. From 1981 to 1984 he achieved two promotions to La Liga, and an equal number of relegations.

On 12 September 1982, Chano scored the first and only league goal for the Andalusians, in a 1–0 success at Atlético Madrid B for the second level championship. He made the first of 31 appearances for the club in the Spanish top flight on 27 December 1981, coming on as a 70th-minute substitute in a 5–1 home routing of CD Castellón.

=== Mallorca / Málaga ===
In July 1984, Chano signed for RCD Mallorca in the second tier, contributing with 27 games to the Balearic Islands side's ascension to the top flight in his second season and leaving following its relegation in his fourth. He then joined CD Málaga, playing two campaigns in the former competition and as many in division two, scoring twice in 1990–91 and retiring in 1992 at the age of 30 from a broken tibia and fibula.

== International career ==
Chano won 11 caps for Spain at youth level, including two for the under-21s. He scored twice at the 1981 FIFA World Youth Championship for the under-20 team, in a group stage exit.

== Personal life ==
In May 2006, Chano was called to court in San Fernando, Cádiz on the charge of being violently abusive towards his son. He had previously been jailed in Cádiz on a charge of child grooming, of which he was later released innocent. In 2003, he was convicted in Málaga of making threats – including death threats – to a woman with whom he had a daughter, also being convicted for threats to his wife in October of that year.

== Honours ==
Spain Under-21

- UEFA Under-21 European Championship runner-up: 1984
