= 1981 Campeonato Nacional finals =

Football matches in Argentina

- Event: 1981 Campeonato Nacional
River Plate	Ferro Carril Oeste
2	0
- on aggregate

First leg
River Plate	Ferro Carril Oeste
1	0
- Date: December 16, 1981
- Venue: Estadio Monumental, Buenos Aires
- Referee: Jorge Eduardo Romero
- Attendance: 40,485

Second leg
Ferro Carril Oeste	River Plate
0	1
- Date: December 20, 1981
- Venue: Estadio Arquitecto Ricardo Etcheverri, Buenos Aires
- Referee: Teodoro Nitti
- Attendance: 22,371

The 1981 Campeonato Nacional finals were the final matches of the 1981 Campeonato Nacional, the second of the two league championships held during the 90th season of Argentine football. The two-legged event was contested between River Plate and Ferro Carril Oeste. The first leg was played at the Estadio Monumental, Buenos Aires, on 16 December 1981 and the second leg was played on 20 December 1981 at the Estadio Arquitecto Ricardo Etcheverri, Buenos Aires.

Each club needed to progress through the group stage and two knockout rounds to reach the final, playing 18 matches in total. Both finalists landed in the same group. Ferro Carril Oeste topped the group before beating Gimnasia y Esgrima (J) and Vélez Sarsfield to reach the final. River Plate finished second and subsequently beat Rosario Central and Independiente to progress to the final.

== Qualified teams ==
Team	Previous finals app.
River Plate	**1932**, **1936**, 1969 Met, 1972 Nac, 1976 Nac, 1978 Nac, **1979 Met**
Ferro Carril Oeste	(none)

- Bold: indicates winning years
- Met: Campeonato Metropolitano
- Nac: Campeonato Nacional

== Venues ==
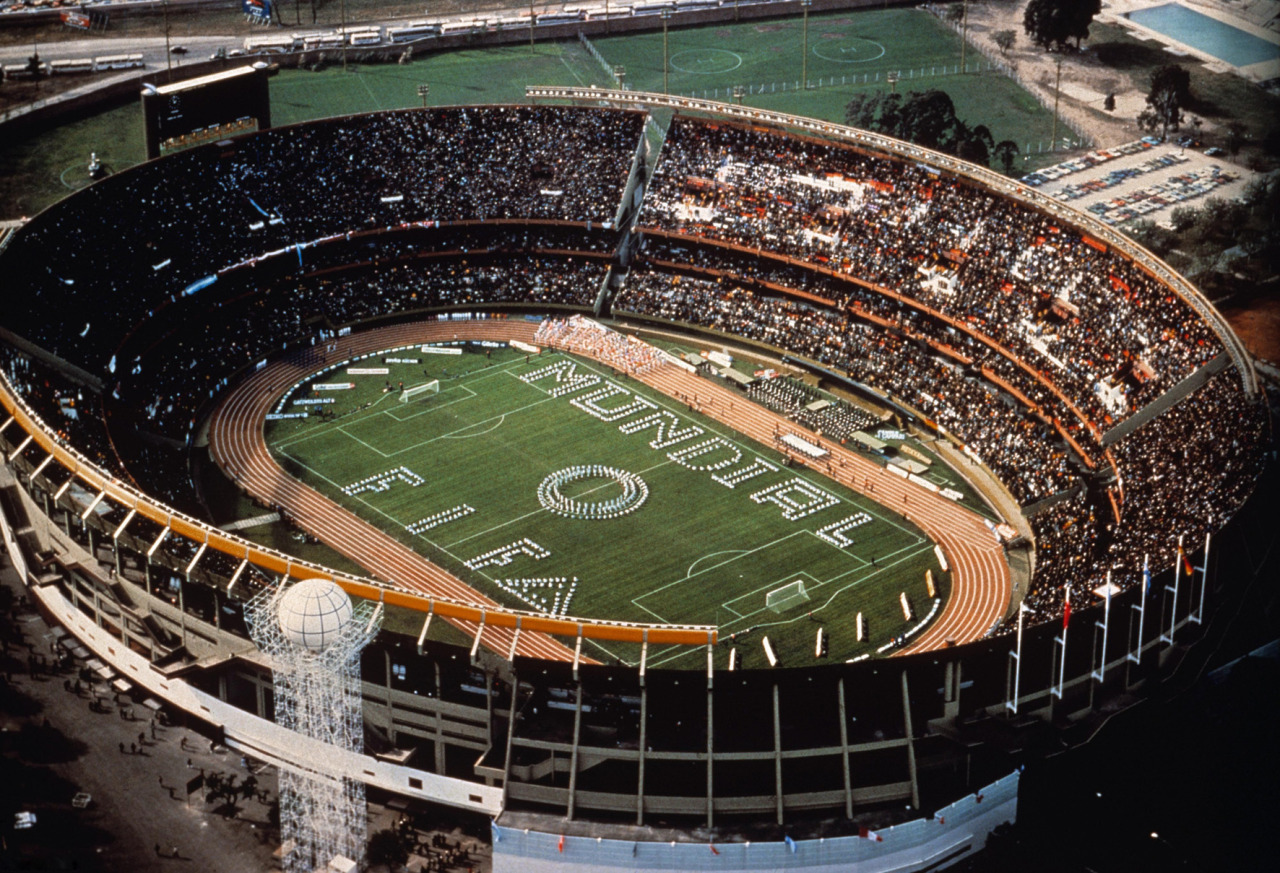
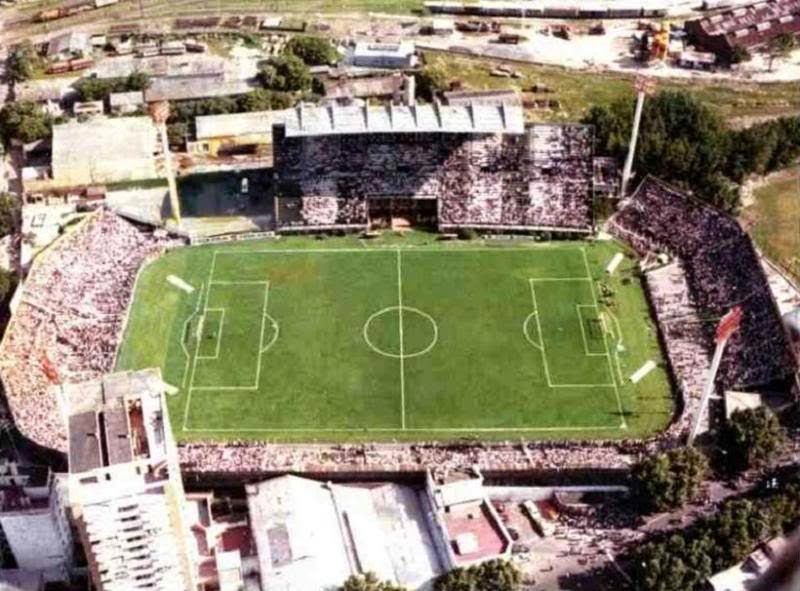
Estadio Monumental (left) and Estadio Arquitecto Ricardo Etcheverri (right), venues

== Matches ==
=== First leg ===
December 16, 1981

River Plate	1–0	Ferro Carril Oeste
Olarticoechea 71'	Report

Estadio Monumental, Buenos Aires
Attendance: 40,485
Referee: Jorge Eduardo Romero

**River Plate**	**Ferro Carril Oeste**

GK	1	(Argentina) Ubaldo Fillol
DF	4	(Argentina) Eduardo Saporiti
DF	2	(Argentina) Alberto Tarantini
DF	6	(Argentina) Daniel Passarella (c)
DF	3	(Argentina) Julio Olarticoechea
MF	8	(Argentina) Juan José López	(substituted off) 45'
MF	5	(Argentina) Enzo Bulleri
MF	10	(Argentina) Emilio Commisso
FW	7	(Argentina) Ramón Díaz
FW	9	(Argentina) Roberto Gordon	(substituted off) 78'
FW	11	(Argentina) José María Vieta
Substitutes:
GK	12	(Argentina) Jorge Ferrero
DF		(Argentina) Jorge Gordillo
MF		(Argentina) Reinaldo Merlo	(substituted on) 45'
MF		(Argentina) Daniel Messina
FW		(Argentina) Pedro Vega	(substituted on) 78'
Manager:
(Argentina) Alfredo Di Stéfano

GK	1	(Argentina) Carlos Barisio
DF	4	(Argentina) Mario Gómez
DF	2	(Argentina) Héctor Cúper
DF	6	(Argentina) Juan Domingo Rocchia
DF	3	(Argentina) Oscar Garré
MF	8	(Argentina) Carlos Arregui
MF	5	(Argentina) Gerónimo Saccardi
MF	10	(Paraguay) Adolfino Cañete
FW	7	(Argentina) Alberto Márcico
FW	9	(Uruguay) Julio César Jiménez	(substituted off) 80'
FW	11	(Argentina) Miguel Ángel Juárez	(substituted off) 80'
Substitutes:
GK	12	(Argentina) Eduardo Basigalup
DF		(Argentina) Silvio Sotelo
MF		(Argentina) Jorge Brandoni	(substituted on) 80'
FW		(Argentina) Claudio Crocco	(substituted on) 80'
FW		(Argentina) Rafael Herrera
Manager:
(Argentina) Carlos Griguol

=== Second leg ===
December 20, 1981

Ferro Carril Oeste	0–1	River Plate
	Report	Kempes 58'

Estadio Arquitecto Ricardo Etcheverri, Buenos Aires
Attendance: 22,371
Referee: Teodoro Nitti

**Ferro Carril Oeste**	**River Plate**

GK	1	(Argentina) Carlos Barisio
DF	4	(Argentina) Mario Gómez
DF	2	(Argentina) Héctor Cúper
DF	6	(Argentina) Juan Domingo Rocchia
DF	3	(Argentina) Oscar Garré
MF	8	(Argentina) Carlos Arregui
MF	5	(Argentina) Gerónimo Saccardi
MF	10	(Paraguay) Adolfino Cañete
FW	7	(Argentina) Claudio Crocco	(substituted off) 54'
FW	9	(Uruguay) Julio César Jiménez
FW	11	(Argentina) Miguel Ángel Juárez	(substituted off) 60'
Substitutes:
GK	12	(Argentina) Eduardo Basigalup
DF		(Argentina) Silvio Sotelo
MF		(Argentina) Jorge Brandoni
MF		(Argentina) Alberto Márcico	(substituted on) 54'
FW		(Argentina) Luis Andreuchi	(substituted on) 60'
Manager:
(Argentina) Carlos Griguol

GK	1	(Argentina) Ubaldo Fillol
DF	4	(Argentina) Eduardo Saporiti
DF	2	(Argentina) Alberto Tarantini
DF	6	(Argentina) Daniel Passarella (c)
DF	3	(Argentina) Julio Olarticoechea
MF	8	(Argentina) Enzo Bulleri
MF	5	(Argentina) Américo Gallego
MF	10	(Argentina) Emilio Commisso
FW	7	(Argentina) Jorge Tévez	(substituted off) 45'
FW	9	(Argentina) Mario Kempes
FW	11	(Argentina) José María Vieta	(substituted off) 67'
Substitutes:
GK	12	(Argentina) Jorge Ferrero
DF		(Argentina) Jorge Gordillo
MF		(Argentina) Reinaldo Merlo	(substituted on) 67'
MF		(Argentina) Daniel Messina
FW		(Argentina) Ramón Díaz	(substituted on) 45'
Manager:
(Argentina) Alfredo Di Stéfano
