= 1979 Campeonato Metropolitano finals =

- Event: 1979 Campeonato Metropolitano
Vélez Sarsfield	River Plate
1	7
- on goal difference

First leg
Vélez Sarsfield	River Plate
0	2
- Date: August 12, 1979
- Venue: Estadio José Amalfitani, Buenos Aires
- Referee: Claudio Busca

Second leg
River Plate	Vélez Sarsfield
5	1
- Date: August 20, 1979
- Venue: Estadio Monumental, Buenos Aires
- Referee: Teodoro Nitti

The 1979 Campeonato Metropolitano finals were the final matches of the 1979 Campeonato Metropolitano, the first of the two league championships held during the 88th season of Argentine football. The two-legged event was contested between Vélez Sarsfield and River Plate. The first leg was played at the Estadio José Amalfitani, Buenos Aires on 12 August 1979 and the second leg was played on 20 August 1979 at the Estadio Monumental, Buenos Aires.

Each club needed to progress through the group stage and a single knockout round to reach the final, playing 20 matches in total. Both finalists landed in the same group. River Plate topped the group before beating Independiente to reach the final. Vélez Sarsfield finished third, but won a tiebreaker match against Argentinos Juniors and subsequently beat Rosario Central to progress to the final.

== Qualified teams ==
Team	Previous app.
River Plate	**1932**, **1936**, 1969 Met
Vélez Sarsfield	(none)

- Bold: indicates winning years
- Met: Campeonato Metropolitano
- Nac: Campeonato Nacional

== Venues ==
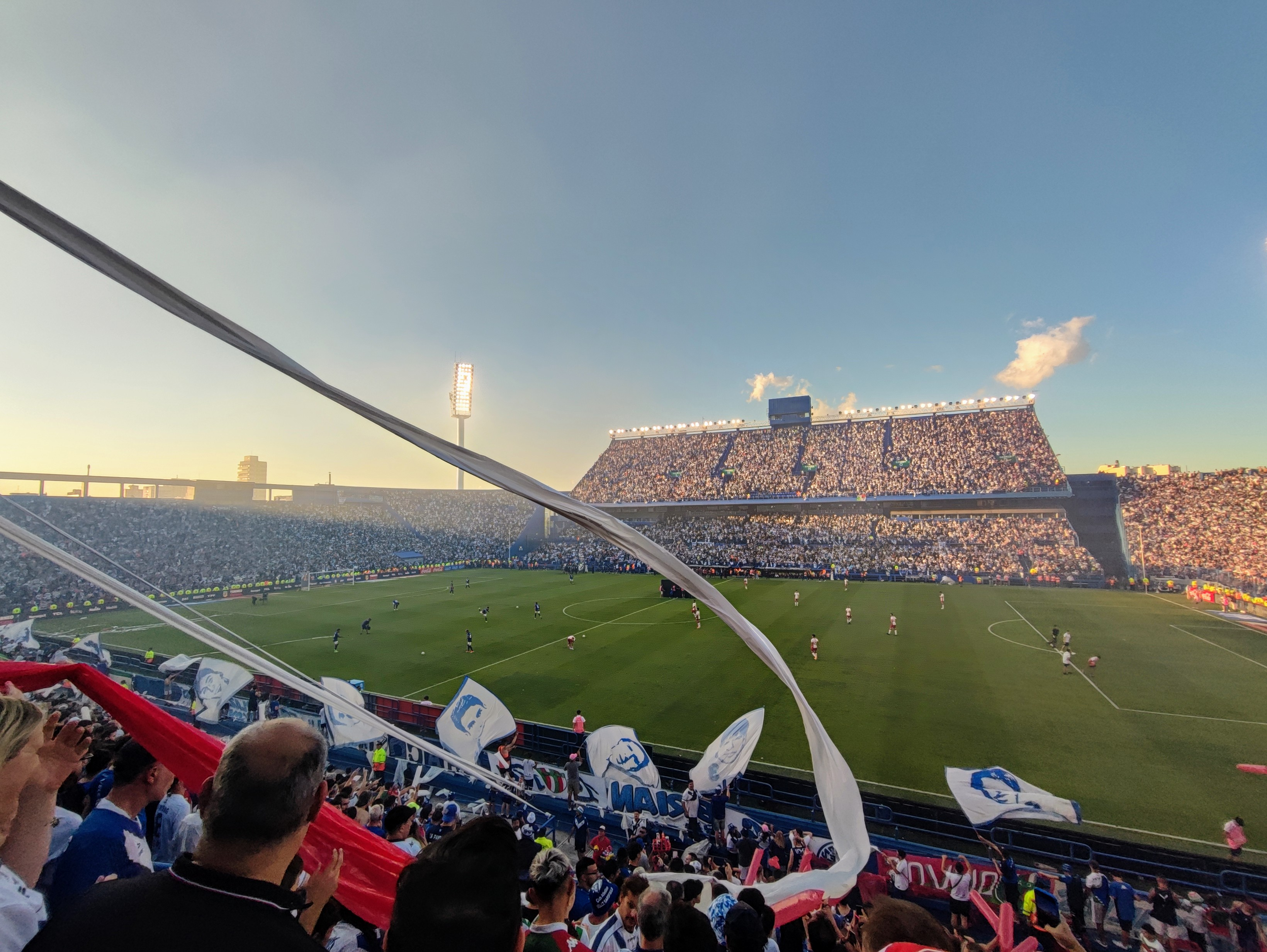
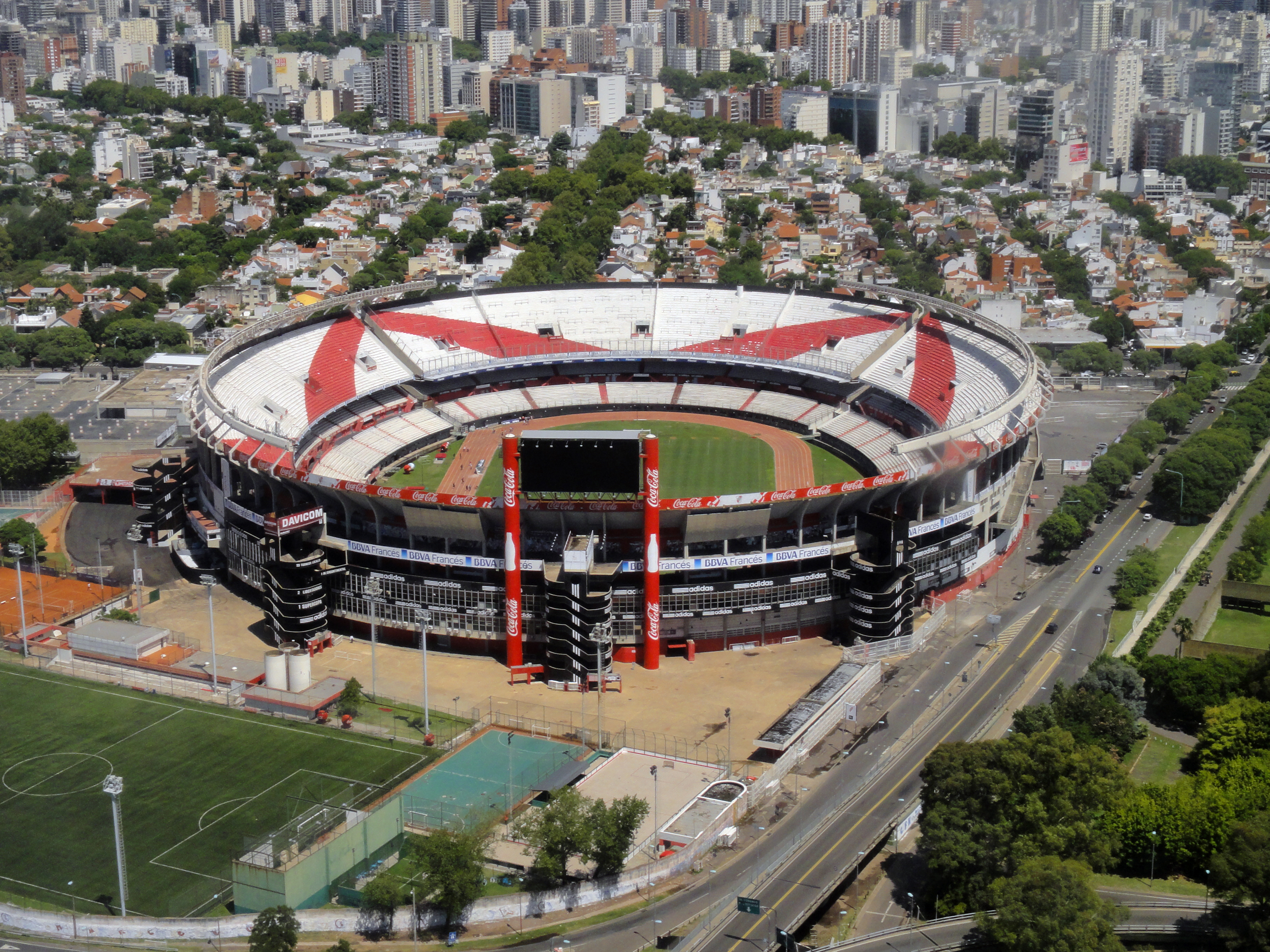
Estadio José Amalfitani (left) and Estadio Monumental (right), venues

== Matches ==
=== First leg ===
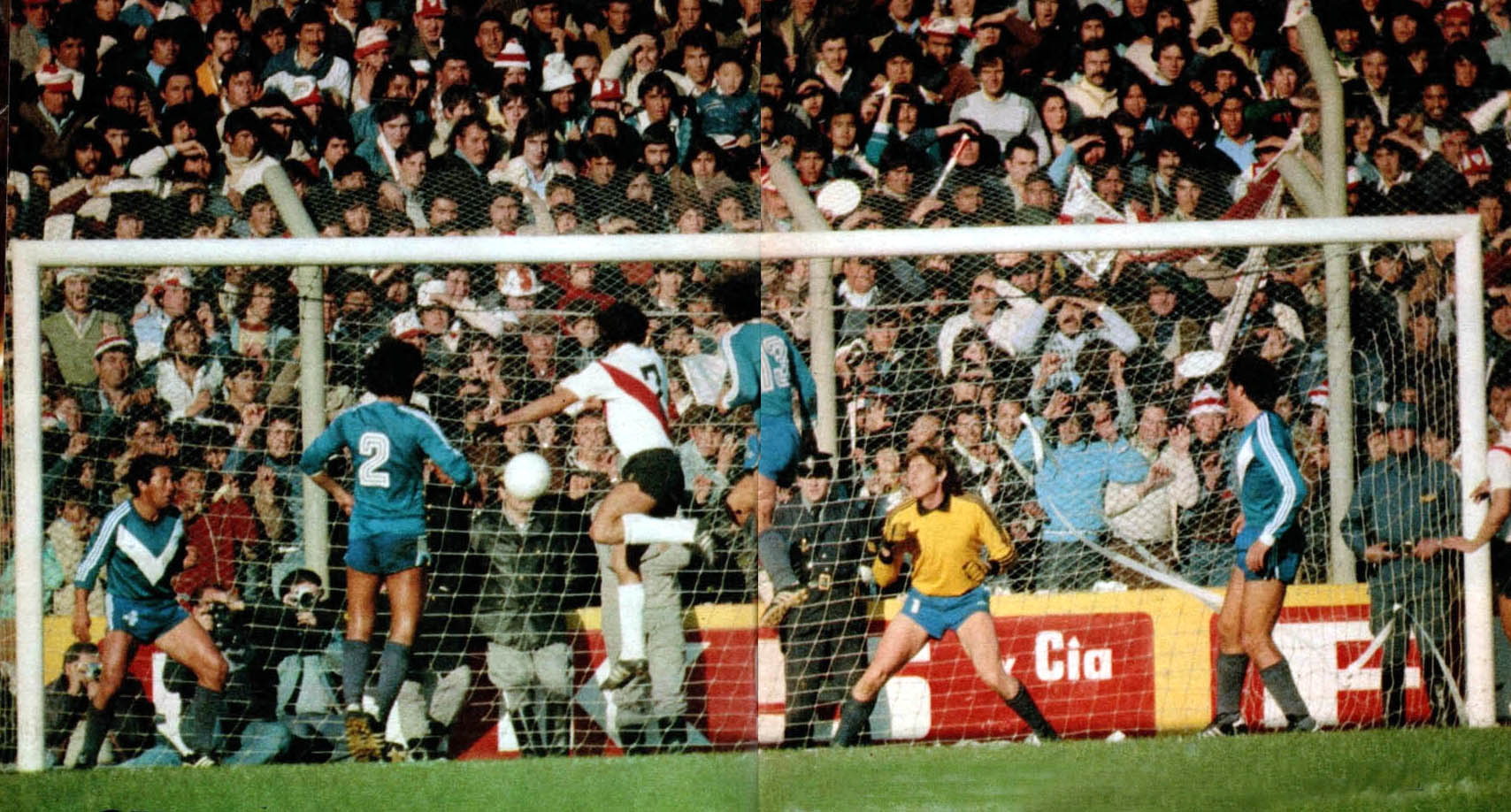
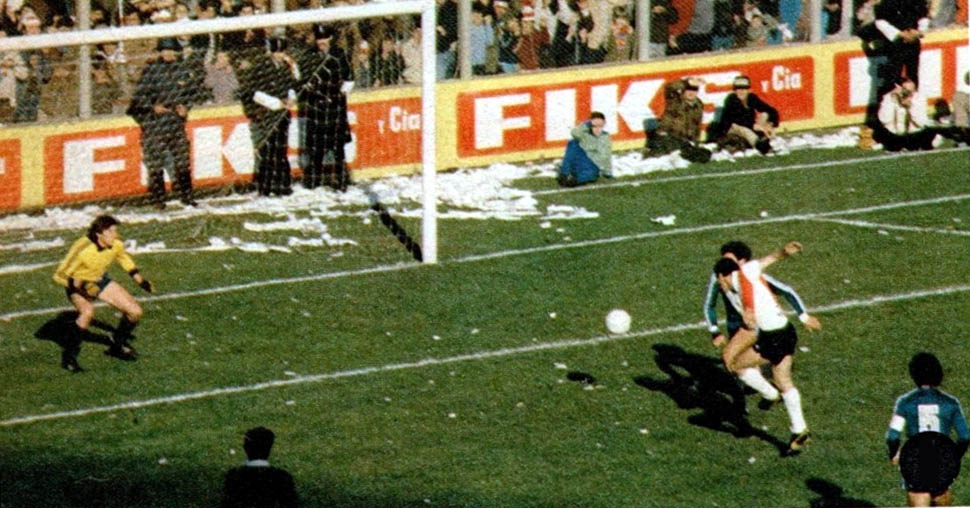
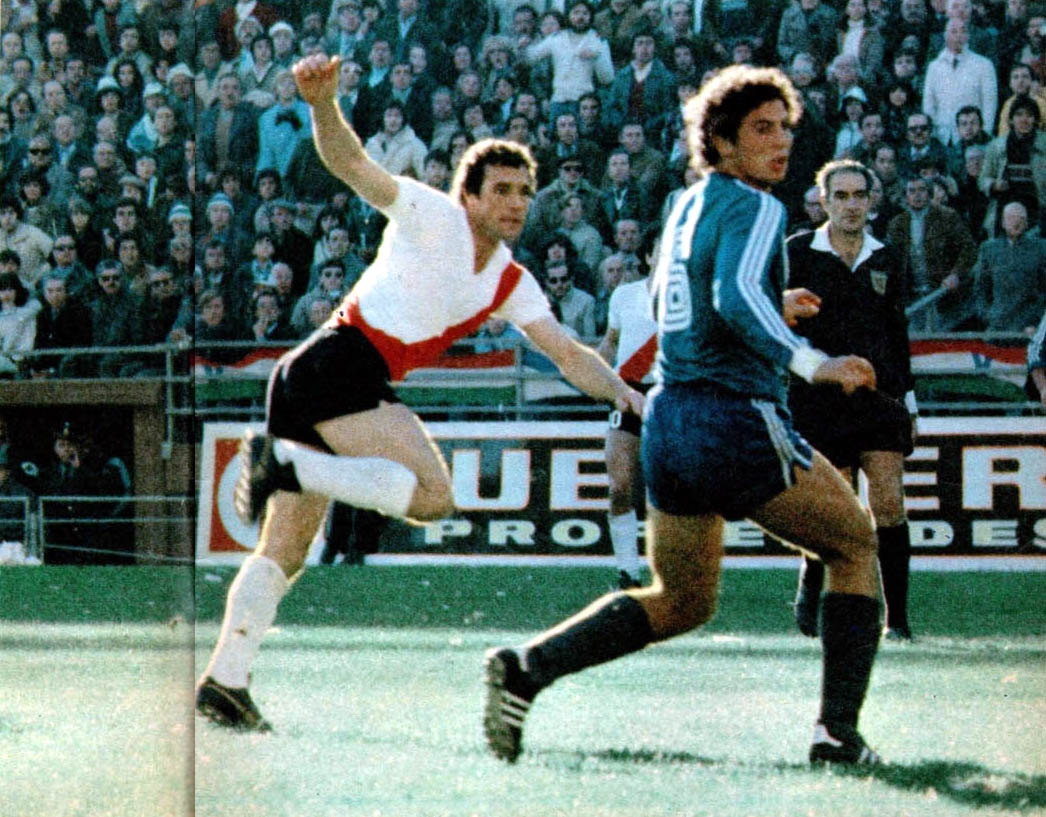
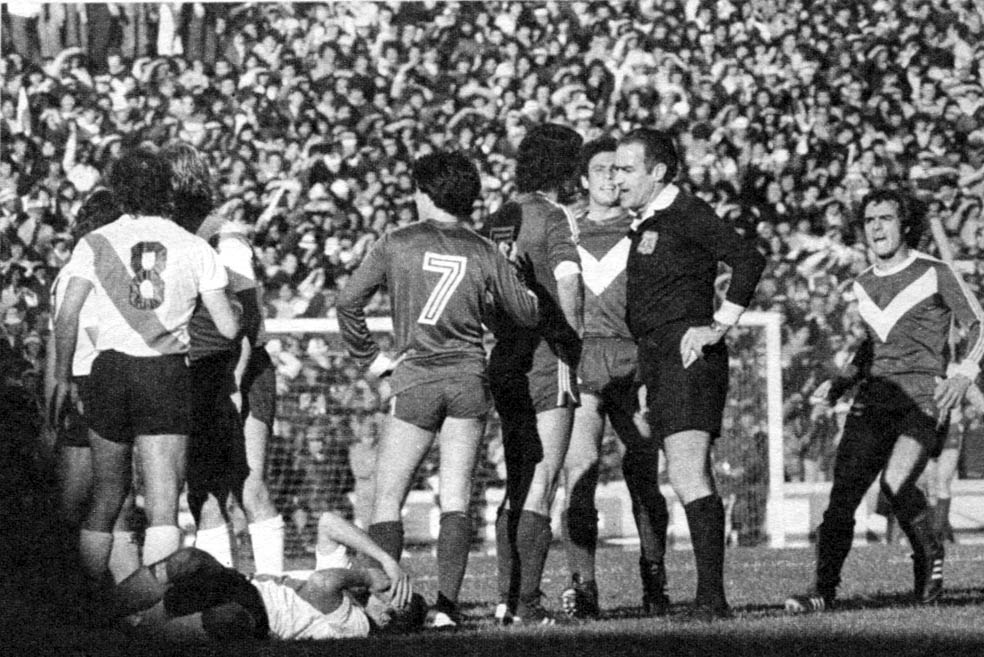
Some moments of the match held in José Amalfitani Stadium; Fltr, Pedro González (1) and Galetti (2–3) goals, and manager Angel Labruna celebrating (4)
August 12, 1979

Vélez Sarsfield	0–2	River Plate
	Report	Galletti 52'; P. Gónzalez 65'

Estadio José Amalfitani, Buenos Aires
Referee: Claudio Busca

**Vélez Sarsfield**	**River Plate**

GK	1	(Argentina) Julio César Falcioni
DF	4	(Uruguay) José Jorge González
DF	2	(Argentina) Orlando Ruíz
DF	6	(Argentina) Omar Jorge
DF	3	(Argentina) Roberto Avanzi		(substituted off) 40'
MF	8	(Argentina) Armando Quinteros
MF	5	(Argentina) Pedro Larraquy
MF	10	(Uruguay) Julio César Jiménez
FW	7	(Argentina) José Antonio Castro	(red card) 59'
FW	9	(Argentina) Omar Pedro Roldán
FW	11	(Argentina) Carlos Ischia
Substitutes:
GK	12	(Argentina) Gustavo Antoun
MF		(Uruguay) Anastasio Malaquín		(substituted on) 40'
MF		(Argentina) Claudio Rotondi
FW		(Argentina) Omar Mehmed
FW		(Argentina) Gabriel Savini
Managers:
(Argentina) Cielinski-Montaño-Bermúdez

GK	1	(Argentina) Ubaldo Fillol
DF	4	(Argentina) Eduardo Saporiti
DF	2	(Argentina) José Luis Pavoni
DF	6	(Argentina) Daniel Passarella (c)
DF	3	(Argentina) Héctor Osvaldo López
MF	8	(Argentina) Juan José López
MF	5	(Argentina) Reinaldo Merlo
MF	10	(Argentina) Norberto Alonso	(substituted off) 83'
FW	7	(Argentina) Pedro Gónzalez
FW	9	(Argentina) Ruben Galletti
FW	11	(Argentina) Emilio Commisso
Substitutes:
GK	12	(Argentina) Luis Landaburu
DF		(Uruguay) Alfredo de los Santos
DF		(Argentina) Pablo Comelles
DF		(Argentina) Daniel Lonardi	(substituted on) 83'
FW		(Argentina) Ramón Díaz
Manager:
(Argentina) Ángel Labruna

=== Second leg ===
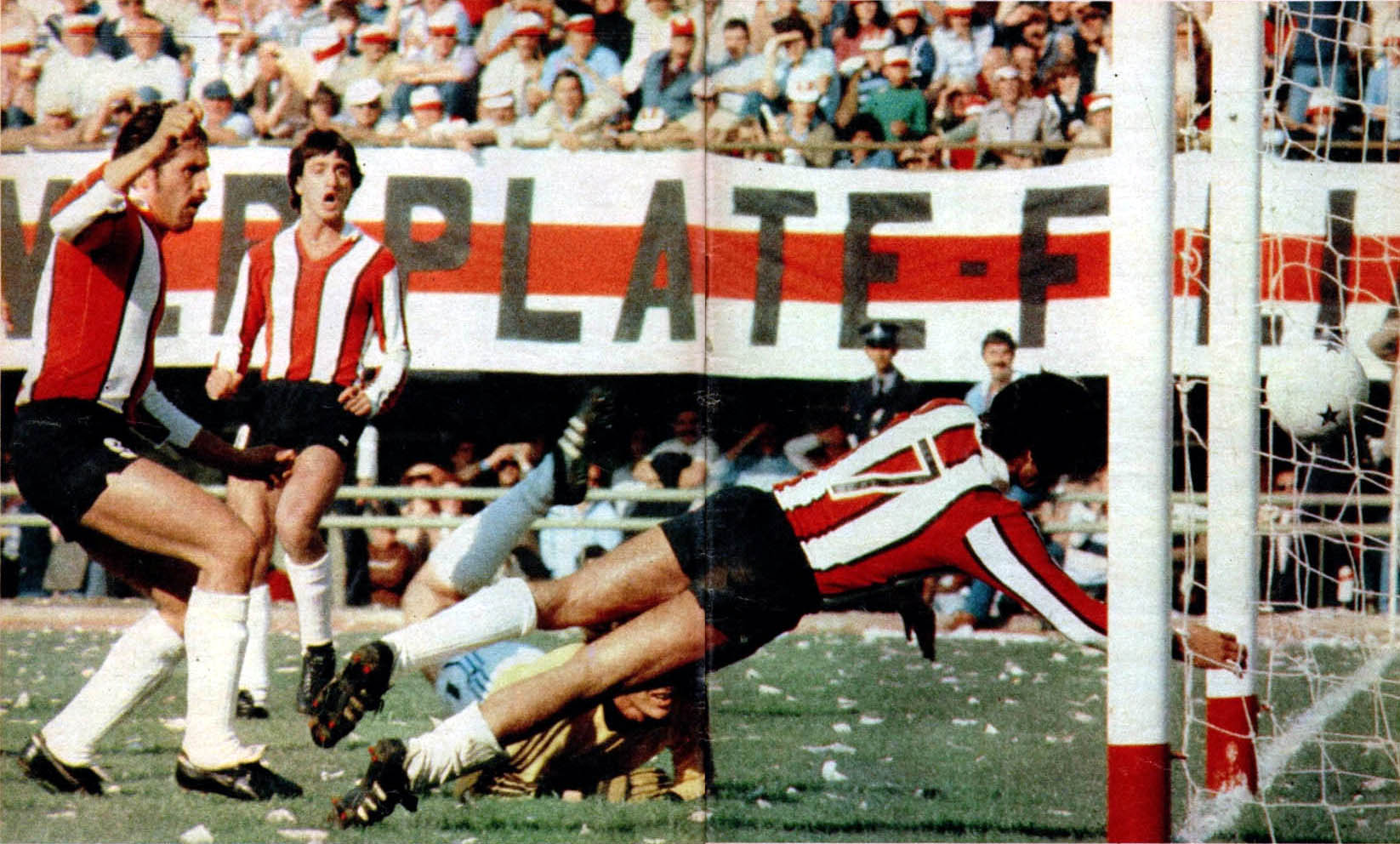
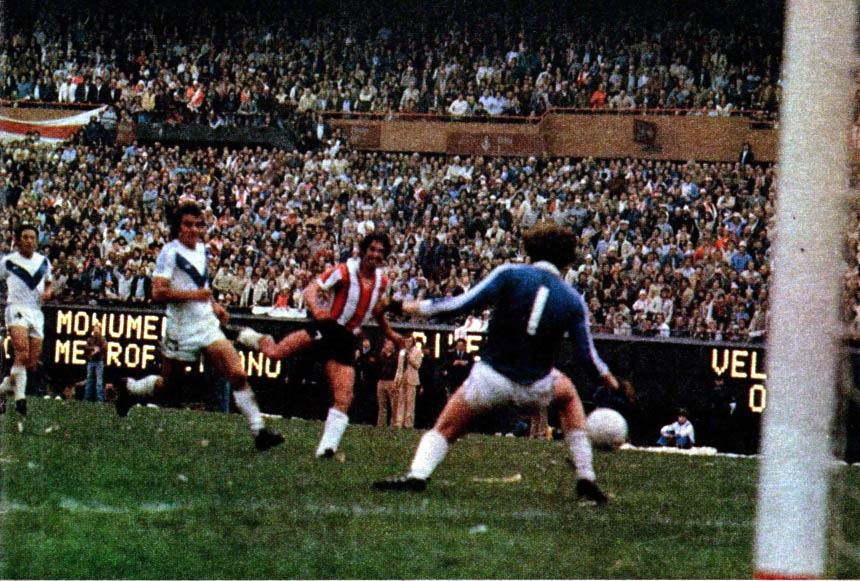
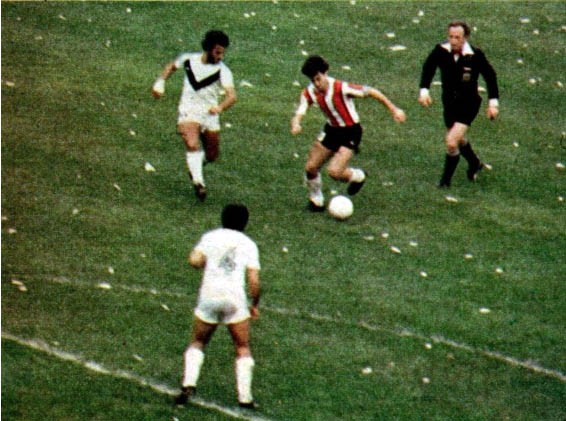
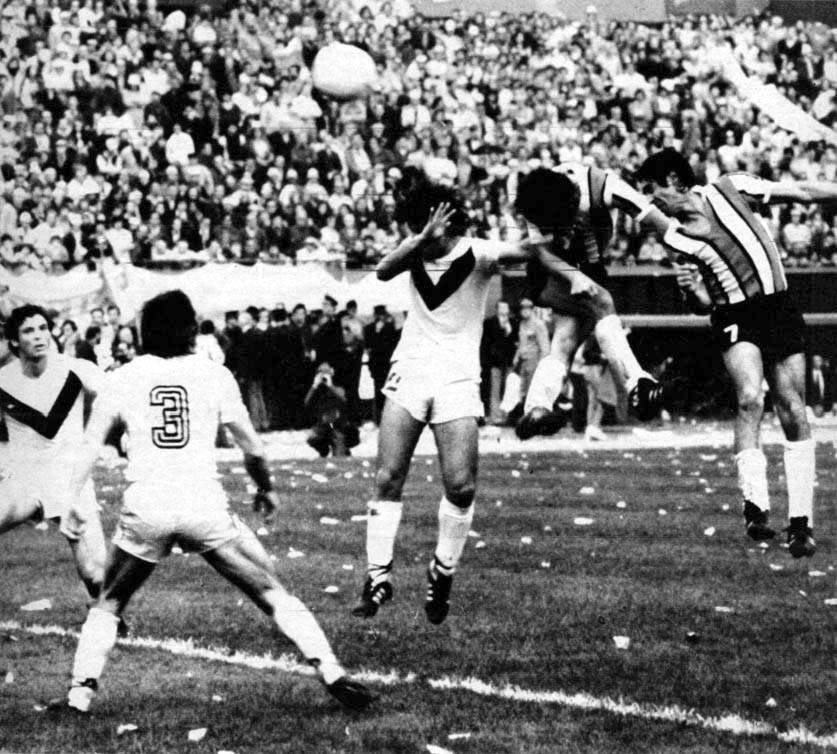
Some moments of the match held in Estadio Monumental
August 20, 1979

River Plate	5–1	Vélez Sarsfield
Alonso 13'; Commisso 41'; Luque 55'; P. Gónzalez 57', 89'	Report	Jorge 87'

Estadio Monumental, Buenos Aires
Referee: Teodoro Nitti

**River Plate**	**Vélez Sarsfield**

GK	1	(Argentina) Ubaldo Fillol
DF	4	(Argentina) Eduardo Saporiti
DF	2	(Argentina) José Luis Pavoni
DF	6	(Argentina) Daniel Passarella (c)
DF	3	(Argentina) Héctor Osvaldo López	(substituted off) 75'
MF	8	(Argentina) Juan José López
MF	5	(Argentina) Reinaldo Merlo
MF	10	(Argentina) Norberto Alonso
FW	7	(Argentina) Pedro Gónzalez
FW	9	(Argentina) Leopoldo Luque
FW	11	(Argentina) Emilio Commisso
Substitutes:
GK	12	(Argentina) Luis Landaburu
DF		(Uruguay) Alfredo de los Santos
DF		(Argentina) Horacio Rodríguez	(substituted on) 75'
MF		(Uruguay) Juan Ramón Carrasco
FW		(Argentina) Ruben Galletti
Manager:
(Argentina) Ángel Labruna

GK	1	(Argentina) Julio César Falcioni
DF	4	(Uruguay) José Jorge González
DF	2	(Argentina) Orlando Ruíz
DF	6	(Argentina) Omar Jorge
DF	3	(Uruguay) Anastasio Malaquín
MF	8	(Argentina) Armando Quinteros	(substituted off) 45'
MF	5	(Argentina) Pedro Larraquy
MF	10	(Argentina) Claudio Rotondi	(substituted off) 58'
FW	7	(Argentina) Carlos Ischia
FW	9	(Uruguay) Julio César Jiménez
FW	11	(Argentina) Jorge Salas
Substitutes:
GK	12	(Argentina) Gustavo Antoun
MF		(Argentina) Jorge Escandón
FW		(Argentina) Omar Mehmed
FW		(Argentina) Omar Pedro Roldán	(substituted on) 45'
FW		(Argentina) Gabriel Savini	(substituted on) 58'
Managers:
(Argentina) Cielinski-Montaño-Bermúdez
