= Carlos Timoteo Griguol =

Argentine footballer and manager (1934–2021)

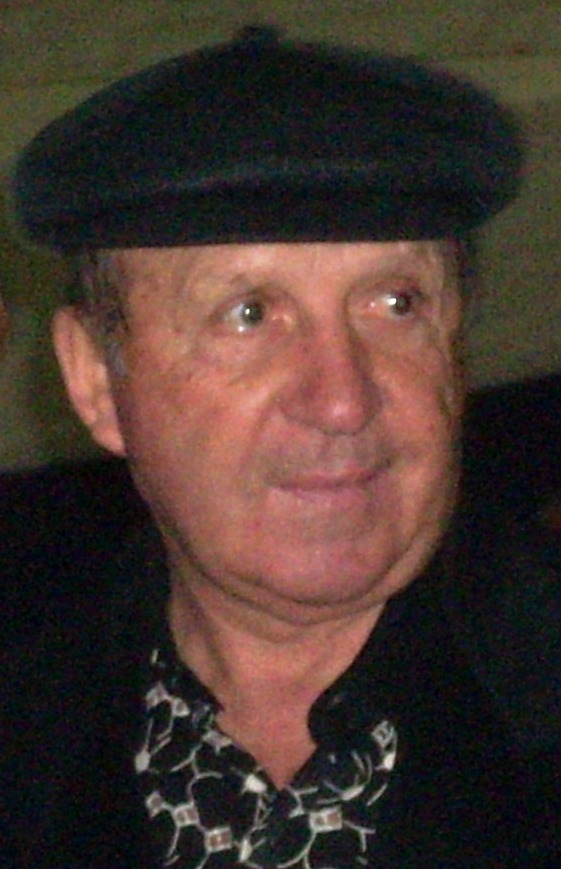
- Griguol in 2008

Personal information
- Full name: Carlos Timoteo Griguol
- Date of birth: 4 September 1936
- Place of birth: Las Palmas, Córdoba, Argentina
- Date of death: 6 May 2021 (aged 84)
- Place of death: Buenos Aires, Argentina
- Position: Midfielder

Senior career*
Years	Team	Apps	(Gls)
1957–1965	Atlanta	236	(16)
1966–1969	Rosario Central	138	(13)

International career
1959–1963	Argentina	12	(0)

Managerial career
- 1971: Rosario Central
- 1973–1975: Rosario Central
- 1975: Tecos de Guadalajara
- 1977–1978: Rosario Central
- 1979: Kimberley
- 1979–1987: Ferro Carril Oeste
- 1987–1988: River Plate
- 1988–1993: Ferro Carril Oeste
- 1994–1999: Gimnasia y Esgrima La Plata
- 1999–2000: Real Betis
- 2000–2001: Gimnasia y Esgrima La Plata
- 2002: Unión de Santa Fe
- 2003–2004: Gimnasia y Esgrima La Plata
- * Club domestic league appearances and goals

Carlos Timoteo Griguol (4 September 1934 – 6 May 2021) was an Argentine football coach and player, who played as a midfielder.

== Life ==
His playing career was spent with Atlanta and Rosario Central. As a coach, after winning the championship with Rosario Central in 1973. He had three spells and a successful career in the Rosario's club. In the 1980s he soared to the top ranks of Argentine football by guiding Ferro Carril Oeste to two championships, in 1982 and 1984, featuring players such as Adolfino Cañete, Héctor Cúper, Gerónimo Saccardi, Juan Domingo Rocchia, Julio Cesar Jiménez, Oscar Garré and Alberto Márcico.

During his Ferrocarril Oeste days, Griguol would videotape the basketball team, and basketball coach Leon Najnudel would return the favor.

His conservative style made Griguol a non-contender for the job of national coach. He did get a chance to coach River Plate in the mid-1980s, but despite winning the Copa Interamericana in 1987 he was swiftly dismissed when results were not forthcoming and the team's style did not please the fans.

In the 1990s, Griguol took Gimnasia y Esgrima de La Plata under his wing, propelling it to its best harvest ever: two second-place finishes. He would return to Gimnasia twice.

He has also worked in Spain as the manager of Real Betis. His trademark was a most unusual token of encouragement: he would slap each player in the face before the team entered the pitch. TV cameras caught this ritual more than once.

Timoteo was known mostly by his middle name, or as el viejo ("the old man").

== Death ==
Griguol was hospitalized in late April 2021, after contracting COVID-19, which derived in pulmonary complications. He also had Alzheimer's disease. He died at Sanatorio Los Arcos in Buenos Aires on 6 May 2021, at the age of 86.

== Honours ==
=== Player ===
Club Atlético Atlanta

- Copa Suecia: 1960

Argentina

- Copa América: 1959

=== Manager ===
Rosario Central

- Primera División: 1973 Nacional

Ferro Carril Oeste

- Primera División: 1982 Nacional, 1984 Nacional

River Plate

- Copa Interamericana: 1986

Gimnasia y Esgrima La Plata

- Argentine Primera División runner-up: 1995 Clausura, 1996 Clausura, 1998 Apertura

== See also ==
- List of football managers with the most matches
