= 1982 Argentine Primera División =

91st season of top-tier football league in Argentina

Primera División
- Season: 1982
- Champions: Estudiantes LP (Metropolitano); Ferro Carril Oeste (Nacional)

The 1982 Primera División season was the 91st season of top-flight football in Argentina. Estudiantes (LP) won the Metropolitano (3rd title) while Ferro Carril Oeste (1st title) won the Nacional championship.

Quilmes and Sarmiento (Junín) were relegated.

== Metropolitano Championship ==
Primera División
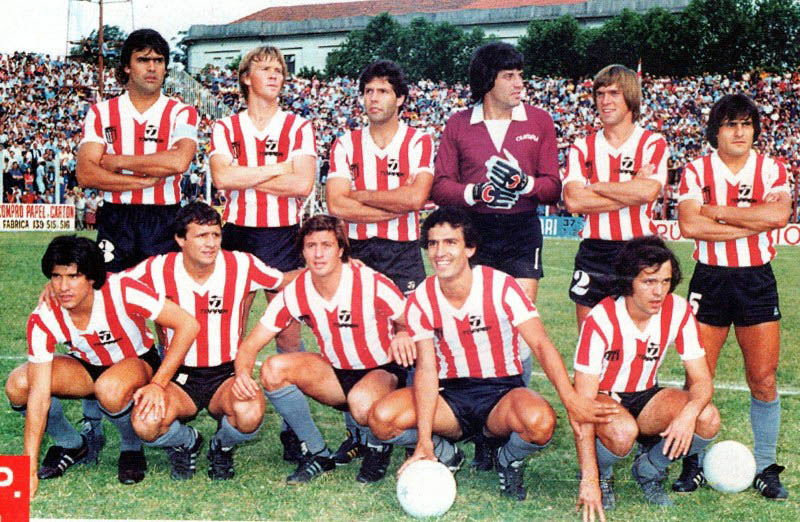
- Estudiantes LP, Metropolitano champion
- Season: 1982
- Champions: Estudiantes LP (3rd title)
- Promoted: Nueva Chicago; Quilmes; Racing (C)
- Relegated: Quilmes; Sarmiento (Junín)
- 1983 Copa Libertadores: Estudiantes LP
- Top goalscorer: (Argentina) Carlos Morete (20 goals)

Pos	Team	Pld	W	D	L	GF	GA	GD	Pts
1	Estudiantes (LP)	36	21	12	3	50	18	+32	54
2	Independiente	36	19	14	3	64	30	+34	52
3	Boca Juniors	36	17	14	5	60	36	+24	48
4	Newell's Old Boys	36	15	14	7	60	34	+26	44
5	Vélez Sársfield	36	16	10	10	45	37	+8	42
6	Huracán	36	15	11	10	44	37	+7	41
7	Racing (C)	36	13	13	10	62	47	+15	39
8	Rosario Central	36	13	11	12	55	49	+6	37
8	Ferro Carril Oeste	36	11	15	10	36	39	−3	37
10	River Plate	36	12	10	14	43	46	−3	34
11	Talleres (C)	36	12	9	15	55	59	−4	33
11	Instituto	36	11	11	14	39	56	−17	33
13	Argentinos Juniors	36	7	14	15	49	58	−9	28
13	Platense	36	9	10	17	41	55	−14	28
13	Nueva Chicago	36	8	12	16	33	50	−17	28
13	Racing	36	10	8	18	36	58	−22	28
17	Unión	36	7	13	16	36	57	−21	27
17	Quilmes	36	9	9	18	30	53	−23	27
19	Sarmiento	36	5	14	17	32	51	−19	24

== Nacional Championship ==
Nacional
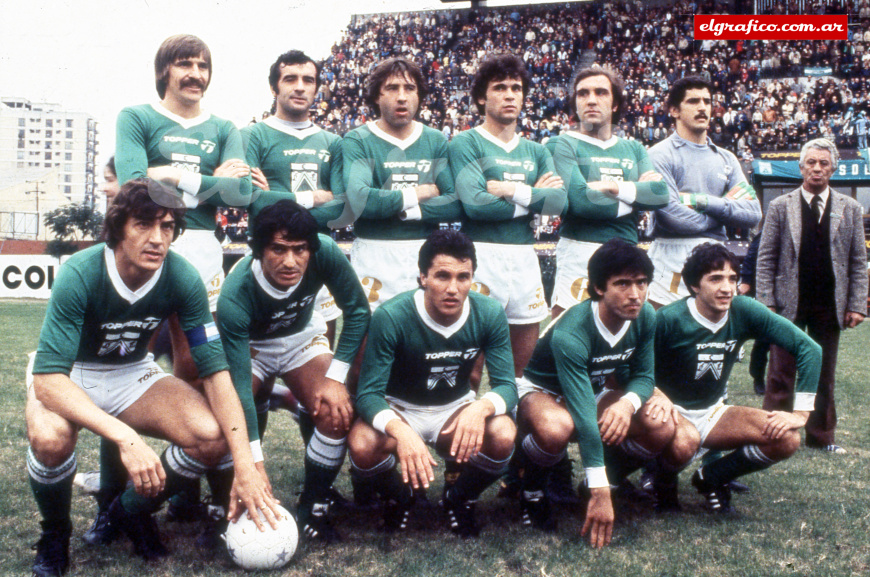
- Ferro Carril Oeste, Nacional champion
- Season: 1982
- Champions: Ferro Carril Oeste (1st title)
- 1983 Copa Libertadores: Ferro Carril Oeste
- Top goalscorer: (Argentina) Miguel A. Juárez (22 goals)

=== Group A ===
Pos	Team	Pld	W	D	L	GF	GA	GD	Pts
1	Quilmes	16	8	4	4	32	27	+5	20
1	Independiente Rivadavia	16	8	4	4	28	30	−2	20
3	Newell's Old Boys	16	5	8	3	29	17	+12	18
3	Instituto	16	7	4	5	28	22	+6	18
5	Sarmiento	16	4	7	5	27	27	0	15
6	River Plate	16	4	6	6	20	27	−7	14
7	Gimnasia y Esgrima (J)	16	3	6	7	22	26	−4	12
8	Nueva Chicago	16	2	7	7	18	28	−10	11

=== Group B ===
Pos	Team	Pld	W	D	L	GF	GA	GD	Pts
1	Ferro Carril Oeste	16	13	3	0	39	9	+30	29
2	Unión	16	8	7	1	29	9	+20	23
2	Independiente	16	9	5	2	27	19	+8	23
4	Argentinos Juniors	16	5	7	4	20	22	−2	17
5	Atlético Uruguay	16	4	3	9	19	26	−7	11
6	San Lorenzo	16	3	4	9	24	33	−9	10
7	Unión San Vicente	16	1	7	8	19	32	−13	9
8	Estudiantes (SdE)	16	1	2	13	13	41	−28	4

=== Group C ===
Pos	Team	Pld	W	D	L	GF	GA	GD	Pts
1	Estudiantes (LP)	16	8	7	1	22	10	+12	23
2	Talleres (C)	16	8	6	2	36	22	+14	22
3	Rosario Central	16	8	3	5	35	16	+19	19
3	Boca Juniors	16	6	7	3	26	18	+8	19
5	Gimnasia y Esgrima (M)	16	7	4	5	25	20	+5	18
6	Central Norte	16	5	3	8	17	27	−10	13
7	Huracán	16	3	6	7	16	22	−6	12
8	Mariano Moreno	16	0	2	14	11	53	−42	2

=== Group D ===
Pos	Team	Pld	W	D	L	GF	GA	GD	Pts
1	Racing (C)	16	8	5	3	30	20	+10	21
2	San Martín (T)	16	8	4	4	18	11	+7	20
3	Vélez Sársfield	16	7	4	5	25	17	+8	18
4	Renato Cesarini	16	5	7	4	22	22	0	17
5	Platense	16	5	6	5	18	16	+2	16
6	Deportivo Roca	16	5	4	7	18	27	−9	14
7	Guaraní Antonio Franco	16	4	4	8	17	25	−8	12
7	Racing	16	2	8	6	16	25	−9	12

=== Quarterfinals ===
Team 1	Agg.	Team 2	1st leg	2nd leg
Unión	2–2 (3–4 p)	Quilmes	1–1	1–1
Estudiantes (LP)	5–3	San Martín (T)	3–1	2–2
Talleres (C)	4–2	Racing (C)	1–1	3–1
Independiente Rivadavia	0–2	Ferro Carril Oeste	0–1	0–0

=== Semifinals ===
Team 1	Agg.	Team 2	1st leg	2nd leg
Ferro Carril Oeste	8–4	Talleres (C)	4–0	4–4
Quilmes	3–0	Estudiantes (LP)	2–0	1–0

=== Finals ===
Team 1	Agg.	Team 2	1st leg	2nd leg
Quilmes	0–2	Ferro Carril Oeste	0–0	0–2

- Ferro Carril Oeste won 2–0 on aggregate.

==== First leg ====
1982 Torneo Nacional Final
20 Jun 1982
First leg

Quilmes	0–0	Ferro Carril Oeste
	Report

Estadio Guido y Sarmiento, Quilmes

==== 2nd leg ====
27 Jun 1982
Second leg

Ferro Carril Oeste	2–0	Quilmes
Juárez 24'; Rocchia 53'	Report

Estadio Ferro Carril Oeste, Buenos Aires
Attendance: 21,166
Referee: (Argentina) Teodoro Nitti

Ferro Carril Oeste	Quilmes

GK	1	(Argentina) Eduardo Basigalup
DF	4	(Argentina) R.C. Gómez
DF	2	(Argentina) Héctor Cúper
DF	6	(Argentina) Juan D. Rocchia
DF	3	(Argentina) Oscar Garré
MF	8	(Argentina) Carlos Arregui
MF	5	(Argentina) Gerónimo Saccardi
MF	10	(Paraguay) Adolfino Cañete
FW	7	(Argentina) Claudio Crocco
FW	9	(Argentina) Alberto Márcico
FW	11	(Argentina) Miguel A. Juárez
Manager:
(Argentina) Carlos Griguol

GK	1	(Argentina) Hugo Tocalli
DF	4	(Argentina) Guillermo Zárate
DF	2	(Argentina) Horacio Milozzi
DF	6	(Argentina) Héctor C. Díaz
DF	3	(Argentina) Oscar E. Ghizzi
MF	8	(Argentina) Néstor Freddiani	Substituted off
MF	5	(Argentina) Jorge Gáspari
MF	10	(Argentina) Oscar A. Gissi	Substituted off
FW	7	(Argentina) César Lorea
FW	9	(Argentina) Daniel Acevedo
FW	11	(Argentina) Miguel A. Converti
Substitutes:
DF		(Argentina) Víctor Martínez	Substituted on
FW		(Argentina) Ramón H. Ponce	Substituted on
Manager:
(Argentina) Roberto Rogel
