= Rubén Galletti =

Argentine footballer

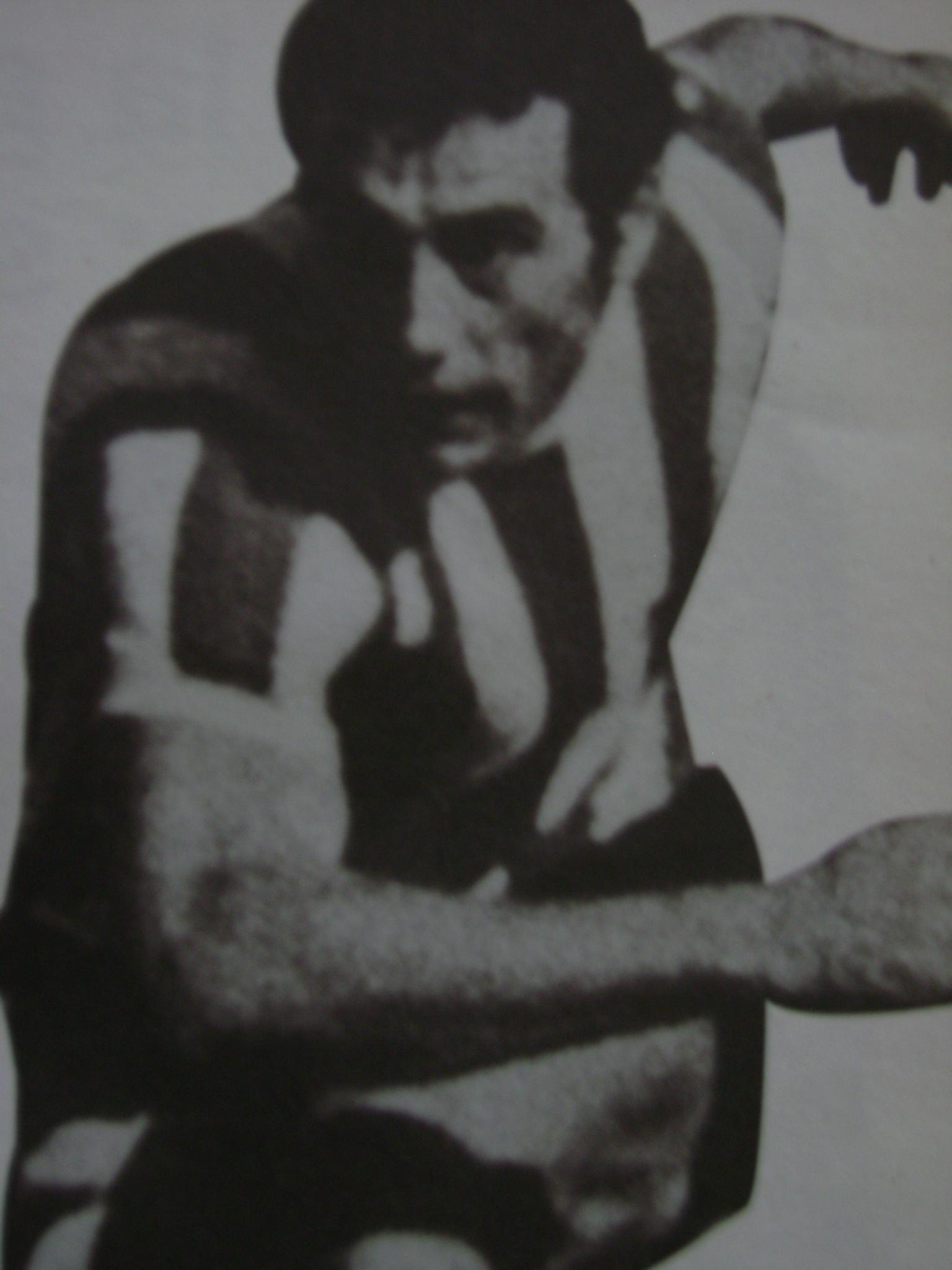
- Galletti while playing for Estudiantes de la Plata

Personal information
- Full name: Rubén Horacio Galletti
- Date of birth: September 10, 1950 (age 76)
- Place of birth: Buenos Aires, Argentina
- Position: Right winger

Youth career
- Boca Juniors

Senior career*
Years	Team	Apps	(Gls)
1971–1972	Boca Juniors	10	(4)
1973–1977	Estudiantes de La Plata	203 (total)	(88)
1978–1979	River Plate	56	(13)
1980–1982	Estudiantes de La Plata	(see above)	
1983	Argentinos Juniors	37	(9)
1984	Huracán	3	(0)
1985	Talleres (RE)	3	(1)

International career
- Argentina
- * Club domestic league appearances and goals as of 23:49, 18 May 2009 (UTC)

Rubén Horacio Galletti (born 10 September 1950 in Buenos Aires) is an Argentine retired footballer who won two Primera División championships and played for the Argentina national team.

Galletti began his playing career with Boca Juniors in a game against Platense on 18 April 1971. After playing only ten games for Boca, he joined Estudiantes de La Plata where he made a total of 203 appearances and scored 88 goals in his two spells with the club.

Between 1978 and 1979 he played for Boca's fiercest rivals River Plate where he won both the Metropolitano and the Nacional championship in 1979.

Galletti returned to Estudiantes in 1980 where he was part of the Metropolitano championship winning team in 1982.

Galletti played out his career with Argentinos Juniors, Huracán and Talleres de Remedios de Escalada.

Galletti's son Luciano also played for Estudiantes before continuing his career in Italy.

Father and son made headlines in the Argentina press in October 2012, when they became donor and recipient in a kidney transplantation after Luciano had to retire from activity while playing for Olympiacos in 2010, following an acute kidney failure.

== Titles ==
Season	Team	Title
Metropolitano1979	River Plate	Primera División Argentina
Nacional 1979	River Plate	Primera División Argentina
Metropolitano 1982	Estudiantes de La Plata	Primera División Argentina
