= Mario Gómez (footballer, born 1957) =

Argentine footballer and manager

Personal information
- Full name: Roberto Carlos Mario Gomez
- Date of birth: 27 February 1957 (age 69)
- Place of birth: Mar del Plata, Argentina
- Position: Defender

Team information
- Current team: Güemes (technical director)

Senior career*
Years	Team	Apps	(Gls)
1979	Temperley	10	(0)
1980–1987	Ferro Carril Oeste	135	(3)
Total		145	(3)

Managerial career
- 1997–1999: Lanús
- 1999: Mallorca
- 2003: Gimnasia La Plata
- 2005–2006: Gimnasia Jujuy
- 2006: Quilmes
- 2006–2007: Gimnasia Jujuy
- 2007–2008: Belgrano
- 2009: Asteras Tripolis
- 2010: Atlético Tucumán
- 2011–2012: Ferro Carril Oeste
- 2012–2013: Gimnasia Jujuy
- 2014: Deportivo Cuenca
- 2014–2015: South China
- 2015–2017: Johor Darul Ta'zim
- 2017–2018: Persib Bandung
- 2019: Borneo Samarinda
- 2020: Arema
- 2020–2021: Borneo Samarinda
- 2022–2023: Deportivo Armenio
- 2023: Gimnasia Jujuy
- 2023–2024: Bhayangkara
- 2024: Talleres Remedios de Escalada
- 2025–2026: Bashundhara Kings
- * Club domestic league appearances and goals

Roberto Carlos Mario Gómez (born 27 February 1957), also known as Mario Gómez, is an Argentine professional football manager and former player who is the technical director of Primera Nacional club Güemes.

== Playing career ==
Gómez started playing for Kimberley in 1979.

In 1980, he signed for Ferro Carril Oeste. Gómez played through Ferro's glory years in the 1980s, helping the club win two Primera División titles in 1982 and 1984. Gómez made 135 appearances for Ferro between 1980 and 1987.

== Managerial career ==
After retiring as a player, in 1995 Gómez initially became Héctor Cúper's assistant at Lanús. When Cúper left to join Mallorca in Spain, Gómez took over as manager and surprisingly led the club to its second Copa CONMEBOL final in a row, eventually losing to Atlético Mineiro. The club also ended up finishing second in the 1998 Clausura.

In the summer of 1999, Gómez took over as manager of Mallorca. He failed to qualify for the UEFA Champions League group stage, losing to Norwegian club Molde on away goals, eventually retreating to the UEFA Cup. He was only in charge for 14 games (three wins, four draws, seven defeats) and was heavily criticized for his defensive style of play.

Gómez then resumed his position as Cúper's assistant at Valencia and then Inter Milan.

In 2004, Gómez returned to Argentina to take over as manager of Gimnasia La Plata.

In December 2004, he took over at Gimnasia Jujuy, guiding them to second place in the Primera B Nacional and consequent promotion to Primera División. The following season, the club achieved a fourth place finish in the 2006 Clausura.

In 2006, Gómez joined the struggling Quilmes, but could not turn the club's fortunes around, failing to win any of his six games in charge. Gómez then returned to Gimnasia Jujuy.

In June 2009, Gómez agreed to sign as manager of Greek team Asteras Tripolis.

On 9 March 2010, bottom club Atlético Tucumán sacked Osvaldo Sosa and replaced him with Gómez. He was able to take the team from the relegation zone to fifth place at the end of the season, before resigning.

In July 2011, Gómez rejoined Gimnasia Jujuy as manager for the third time.

In 2013, Gómez was confirmed as the head coach of Ecuador's Deportivo Cuenca.

At the end of 2014, South China announced that Gómez had taken over as the club's new manager, replacing Yeung Ching Kwong.

Between 2015 and 2017, Gómez led Johor Darul Ta'zim to two Super League Malaysia titles, in 2015 and 2016. The club also managed to win the 2015 AFC Cup, with JDT becoming the first Southeast Asian team in history to win the competition. He was awarded as the best coach in Malaysia in 2015.

In 2016, Gómez also managed to win the Malaysia FA Cup and the Malaysian Charity Shield.

In March 2017, he was initially appointed as the Malaysia national team's head coach. However, Gómez demanded a higher salary, which was subsequently rejected.

In November 2017, Persib Bandung confirmed the signing of Gómez as head coach.

Gómez started a court battle against JDT due to unpaid wages. JDT's president Tunku Ismail Ibrahim denied the allegations and hit back over claims.

On 3 October 2023, Gómez was appointed as head coach of Bhayangkara, in the hope of bringing the team out of the relegation zone. However, Gómez was unable to lift the team out of bottom position with only one win in nine matches. On 29 February 2024, Gómez was eventually sacked from Bhayangkara following poor performances.

== Managerial statistics ==
As of 25 August 2025

Managerial record by team and tenure
Team	Nat.	From	To	Record					Ref.
Team	Nat.	From	To	G	W	D	L	Win %	Ref.
Lanús	(Argentina)	1 November 1997	30 June 1999	0	0	0	0	—	
Mallorca	(Spain)	1 July 1999	15 November 1999	0	0	0	0	—	
Gimnasia La Plata	(Argentina)	4 July 2003	7 October 2003	0	0	0	0	—	
Gimnasia Jujuy	(Argentina)	1 July 2005	30 June 2006	0	0	0	0	—	
Quilmes	(Argentina)	1 July 2006	11 September 2006	0	0	0	0	—	
Gimnasia de Jujuy	(Argentina)	12 October 2006	4 November 2007	0	0	0	0	—	
Belgrano	(Argentina)	19 November 2007	30 June 2008	0	0	0	0	—	
Asteras Tripolis	(Greece)	1 July 2009	25 October 2009	0	0	0	0	—	
Atlético Tucumán	(Argentina)	9 March 2010	30 June 2010	0	0	0	0	—	
Ferro	(Argentina)	8 July 2011	15 March 2012	0	0	0	0	—	
Gimnasia Jujuy	(Argentina)	20 March 2012	13 December 2013	0	0	0	0	—	
Deportivo Cuenca	(Ecuador)	1 January 2014	2 March 2014	0	0	0	0	—	
South China	(Hong Kong)	15 December 2014	28 April 2015	0	0	0	0	—	
Johor Darul Ta'zim	(Malaysia)	29 April 2015	18 January 2017	74	52	15	7	70.27	
Persib Bandung	(Indonesia)	27 November 2017	12 December 2018	36	16	10	10	44.44	
Borneo Samarinda	(Indonesia)	15 April 2019	31 December 2019	0	0	0	0	—	
Arema	(Indonesia)	2 January 2020	3 August 2020	0	0	0	0	—	
Borneo Samarinda	(Indonesia)	21 August 2020	10 September 2021	0	0	0	0	—	
Deportivo Armenio	(Argentina)	1 January 2022	8 March 2023	0	0	0	0	—	
Gimnasia de Jujuy	(Argentina)	9 March 2023	15 July 2023	0	0	0	0	—	
Bhayangkara	(Indonesia)	1 November 2023	29 February 2024	0	0	0	0	—	
Talleres	(Argentina)	28 August 2024	31 December 2024	0	0	0	0	—	
Bashundhara Kings	(Bangladesh)	25 August 2025	Present	0	0	0	0	—	
Career Total				110	68	25	17	61.82	

== Honours ==
=== As player ===
Ferro Carril Oeste

- Primera División: 1982 Nacional, 1984 Nacional

=== As manager ===
Lanús

- Clausura runner-up: 1998
- Copa CONMEBOL runner-up: 1997

Gymnasia y Esgrima de Jujuy

- Primera B Nacional runner-up: 2005 (Promotion to Primera División)

Deportivo Cuenca

- Lunar New Year Cup: 2014

Johor Darul Ta'zim

- Malaysia Super League: 2015, 2016
- Malaysia FA Cup: 2016
- Piala Sumbangsih: 2016
- AFC Cup: 2015

=== Individual ===
- FAM Football Awards – Best Coach: 2015
