= Claudio Crocco =

Argentine footballer

Personal information
- Date of birth: 12 May 1958 (age 68)
- Place of birth: Buenos Aires, Argentina
- Position: Midfielder

Senior career*
Years	Team	Apps	(Gls)
1975–1985	Ferro Carril Oeste	264	(33)
1984	→ Universidad de Chile (loan)	8	(2)
1986	Platense	5	(1)
1986–1987	Unión	4	(1)
1987	Italiano	7	(0)
- * Club domestic league appearances and goals

Claudio Crocco (born 12 May 1958) is an Argentine former professional footballer who played as a midfielder for clubs in Argentina and Chile.

== Career ==
- Ferro Carril Oeste 1975–1984
- Universidad de Chile 1984
- Ferro Carril Oeste 1985
- Platense 1986
- Unión de Santa Fe 1986–1987
- Deportivo Italiano 1987

== Honours ==
Ferro Carril Oeste

- Argentine Primera División: 1982, 1984
- Primera División B: 1978
