= Alberto Márcico =

Argentine footballer and manager

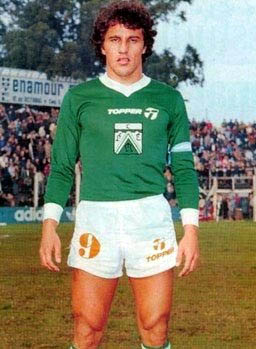
- Márcico with Ferro Carril Oeste in 1982

Personal information
- Full name: Alberto José Márcico
- Date of birth: 13 May 1960 (age 66)
- Place of birth: Corrientes, Argentina
- Position: Midfielder

Senior career*
| Years | Team | Apps | (Gls) |
| 1980–1985 | Ferro Carril Oeste | 210 | (44) |
| 1986–1992 | Toulouse | 227 | (64) |
| 1992–1995 | Boca Juniors | 126 | (13) |
| 1996–1998 | Gimnasia y Esgrima (LP) | 31 | (10) |

International career
| 1983–1992 | Argentina | 15 | (0) |
- * Club domestic league appearances and goals

Alberto José Márcico (born 13 May 1960) is an Argentine former professional football midfielder. He played club football with Ferro Carril Oeste, Toulouse, Boca Juniors, and Gimnasia y Esgrima (LP). He represented the Argentina national football team on 15 occasions between 1983 and 1992, including at the 1983 Copa América.

In 2003, he coached Nueva Chicago for five games.

== Career ==
Márcico made his professional debut in 1980 with Ferro Carril Oeste under manager Carlos Timoteo Griguol. In 1982, he was part of the team that won the Nacional championship without losing a single game. In 1984, he helped Ferro to win their second Nacional and was awarded the 1984 Player of the Year title.

Márcico was sold to French club Toulouse FC where he played for six years before returning to Argentina in 1992 to play for Boca Juniors where he won three titles with the club, but his career was interrupted several times with injuries. One of the highlights of his time with Boca came on 18 June 1995, when he scored a goal in a 4–2 win against fierce rivals River Plate in the superclásico derby at Estadio Monumental.

In 1996, he was offered a chance to return to Ferro, but he chose instead to rejoin former manager Griguol, who was then in charge of Gimnasia de La Plata. Márcico started his time at Gimnasia in fine form scoring 10 goals in 14 games, but then the injuries returned, eventually forcing him to quit the game in 1998.

After retirement Márcico went into coaching, he returned to Boca in 2002 as field assistant to Oscar Tabárez. He was also head coach of Nueva Chicago for a short spell. He now runs a football school in the French city of Auch.

== Honours ==
Ferro Carril Oeste

- Primera División: 1982 Nacional, 1984 Nacional

Boca Juniors

- Primera División: 1992 Apertura
- Copa Master: 1992
- Copa de Oro: 1993

=== Individual ===
- Footballer of the Year of Argentina: 1984
