= Alfredo de los Santos (footballer) =

Uruguayan footballer (born 1956)

Personal information
- Full name: Alfredo Héctor de los Santos Silva
- Date of birth: 12 February 1956 (age 70)
- Place of birth: Punta del Este, Uruguay
- Position: Defender

Senior career*
Years	Team	Apps	(Gls)
1974–1979	Nacional	83	(32)
1979–1984	River Plate	62	(1)
1984	Defensor		
1985–1986	Barcelona		
1986–1987	Cobras de Querétaro		

International career
1975–1983	Uruguay	25	(0)
- * Club domestic league appearances and goals

Alfredo Héctor de los Santos Silva (born 12 February 1956) is a Uruguayan footballer. He played in twenty-five matches for the Uruguay national football team from 1975 to 1983. He was also part of Uruguay's squad for the 1975 Copa América tournament. At a club level, he played for Nacional, River Plate, and Barcelona, among others.
