= Omar Jorge =

Argentine footballer

Personal information
- Date of birth: 30 August 1956 (age 70)
- Position: Defender

Senior career*
Years	Team	Apps	(Gls)
1979–1983	Vélez Sarsfield		
1983–1987	Estudiantes Tecos	106	(6)
1989–1992	Douglas Haig		

International career
1983	Argentina	2	(0)
- * Club domestic league appearances and goals

Omar Jorge (born 30 August 1956) is an Argentine former footballer who played as a defender.

== Career ==
Jorge played club football in Argentina and Mexico for Vélez Sarsfield, Estudiantes Tecos, and Douglas Haig.

He earned two international caps for Argentina in 1983.
