= Gustavo Antoun =

Argentine footballer

Personal information
- Full name: Gustavo Miguel Ángel Antoun
- Date of birth: November 11, 1957 (age 68)
- Place of birth: Sarmiento, Chubut, Argentina
- Position: Goalkeeper

Youth career
- Vélez Sarsfield

Senior career*
Years	Team	Apps	(Gls)
1978–1979	Vélez Sarsfield	1	(0)
1980	Villa Dálmine	1	(0)
1981	Deportes Linares		
1981–1982	San Luis	15	(0)
1983–1984	Arsenal de Sarandí	14	(0)
1985–1987	Instituto	13	(0)
1987–1988	Racing de Córdoba	1	(0)
1988–1989	Instituto	(total)	(↑)
Medal record
Second place	Argentine Primera División	1979
- * Club domestic league appearances and goals

Gustavo Miguel Ángel Antoun (born November 11, 1957) is a retired Argentine footballer who played for clubs from Argentina and Chile.

== Teams ==
- (Argentina) Vélez Sarsfield 1978–1979
- (Argentina) Villa Dálmine 1980
- (Chile) Deportes Linares 1981
- (Chile) San Luis 1981–1982
- (Argentina) Arsenal de Sarandí 1983–1984
- (Argentina) Instituto 1985–1987
- (Argentina) Racing de Córdoba 1987–1988
- (Argentina) Instituto 1988–1989

== Post-retirement ==
Antoun graduated as a lawyer and became a judge.
