= 1984 Argentine Primera División =

93rd season of top-tier football league in Argentina

Primera División
- Season: 1984
- Champions: Argentinos Juniors (Metropolitano); Ferro Carril Oeste (Nacional)

Statistics of Primera División Argentina in season 1984.

== Nacional Championship ==
Nacional
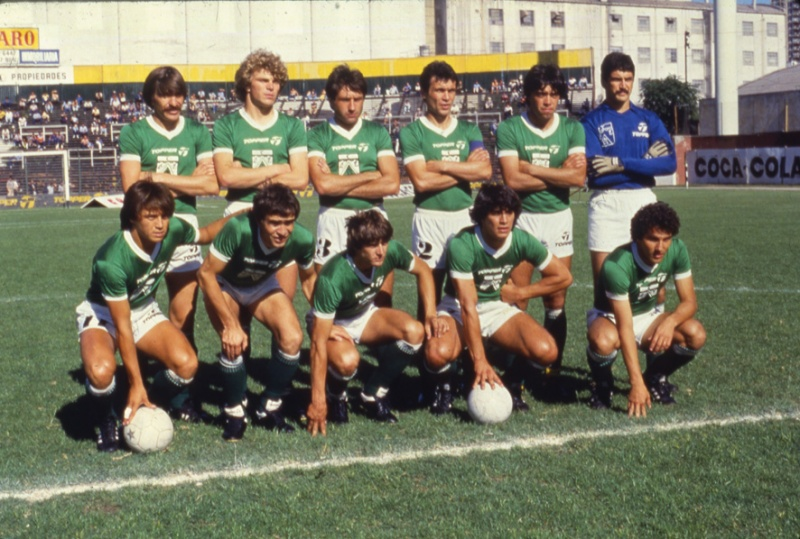
- Ferro Carril Oeste, Nacional champions
- Season: 1984
- Champions: Ferro Carril Oeste (2nd title)
- Promoted: Atlanta; Chacarita Juniors
- 1985 Copa Libertadores: Ferro Carril Oeste
- Top goalscorer: (Argentina) Pedro Pasculli (9 goals)

=== Group stages ===
Group A
Pos	Team	Pld	W	D	L	GF	GA	GD	Pts
1	Newell's Old Boys	6	3	2	1	9	8	+1	8
2	Talleres (C)	6	3	1	2	14	11	+3	7
3	Boca Juniors	6	2	3	1	7	5	+2	7
4	Ferro Carril Oeste (GP)	6	0	2	4	6	12	−6	2

Group B
Pos	Team	Pld	W	D	L	GF	GA	GD	Pts
1	San Lorenzo	6	3	3	0	14	8	+6	9
2	Gimnasia y Esgrima (M)	6	0	5	1	10	11	−1	5
3	Unión (GP)	6	0	5	1	6	7	−1	5
4	Temperley	6	0	5	1	6	10	−4	5

Group C
Pos	Team	Pld	W	D	L	GF	GA	GD	Pts
1	Belgrano	6	4	1	1	8	4	+4	9
2	Rosario Central	6	3	2	1	9	6	+3	8
3	Vélez Sársfield	6	2	2	2	9	6	+3	6
4	Central Norte	6	0	1	5	2	12	−10	1

Group D
Pos	Team	Pld	W	D	L	GF	GA	GD	Pts
1	River Plate	6	5	1	0	22	5	+17	11
2	Huracán	6	4	0	2	14	8	+6	8
3	Estudiantes (RC)	6	1	2	3	9	10	−1	4
4	Atlético Uruguay	6	0	1	5	2	24	−22	1

Group E
Pos	Team	Pld	W	D	L	GF	GA	GD	Pts
1	Ferro Carril Oeste	6	3	3	0	12	6	+6	9
2	Instituto	6	2	3	1	11	6	+5	7
3	Platense	6	2	3	1	7	7	0	7
4	Altos Hornos Zapla	6	0	1	5	2	13	−11	1

Group F
Pos	Team	Pld	W	D	L	GF	GA	GD	Pts
1	Independiente	6	4	1	1	10	3	+7	9
2	Atlético Tucumán	6	2	1	3	7	7	0	5
3	Chacarita Juniors	6	4	0	2	14	6	+8	2 (Note: Chacarita Juniors had 6 points deducted)
4	Kimberley	6	0	2	4	3	18	−15	2

Notes:

Group G
Pos	Team	Pld	W	D	L	GF	GA	GD	Pts
1	Argentinos Juniors	6	3	3	0	10	4	+6	9
2	Racing (C)	6	1	4	1	6	7	−1	6
3	Unión	6	2	1	3	9	12	−3	5
4	Ledesma	6	1	2	3	9	11	−2	4

Group H
Pos	Team	Pld	W	D	L	GF	GA	GD	Pts
1	Estudiantes (LP)	6	5	1	0	15	5	+10	11
2	Olimpo	6	3	1	2	10	9	+1	7
3	Atlanta	6	2	1	3	9	9	0	5
4	Unión San Vicente	6	0	1	5	6	17	−11	1

=== Knockout stages ===
2nd round
Home (1st leg)	Home (2nd leg)	1st Leg	2nd leg	Aggr.
Belgrano	Atlético Tucumán	2-0	0-0	2-0
Racing (C)	San Lorenzo	1-1	1-3	2-4
Estudiantes (LP)	Talleres (C)	0-1	1-1	1-2
Rosario Central	Independiente	1-1	0-1	1-2
Instituto	River Plate	0-2	0-0	0-2
Ferro Carril Oeste	Huracán	1-0	0-1	1-1 (7-6 p)
Olimpo	Newell's Old Boys	0-0	1-1	1-1 (6-7 p)
Argentinos Juniors	Gimnasia y Esgrima (M)	3-2	2-1	5-3

Quarter-final
Home (1st leg)	Home (2nd leg)	1st Leg	2nd leg	Aggr.
Belgrano	River Plate	0-4	2-0	2-4
Argentinos Juniors	Talleres (C)	2-1	2-4	4-5
Newell's Old Boys	San Lorenzo	2-2	1-2	3-4
Ferro Carril Oeste	Independiente	1-1	1-0	2-1

Semi-final
Home (1st leg)	Home (2nd leg)	1st Leg	2nd leg	Aggr.
San Lorenzo	River Plate	1-2	1-2	2-4
Ferro Carril Oeste	Talleres (C)	1-0	1-1	2-1

=== Finals ===
Home (1st leg)	Home (2nd leg)	1st Leg	2nd leg	Aggr.
River Plate	Ferro Carril Oeste	0-3	0-1	0-4

Ferro Carril Oeste won on aggregate 4–0.

1984 Torneo Nacional Final
24 May 1984
First leg

River Plate	0–3	Ferro Carril Oeste
	Report	Cañete; Noremberg; Márcico

River Plate, Buenos Aires

30 May 1984
Second leg

Ferro Carril Oeste	1–0	River Plate
Cañete 2'	Report

Ferro C. Oeste, Buenos Aires
Attendance: 23,650
Referee: Teodoro Nitti

== Metropolitano Championship ==
Metropolitano
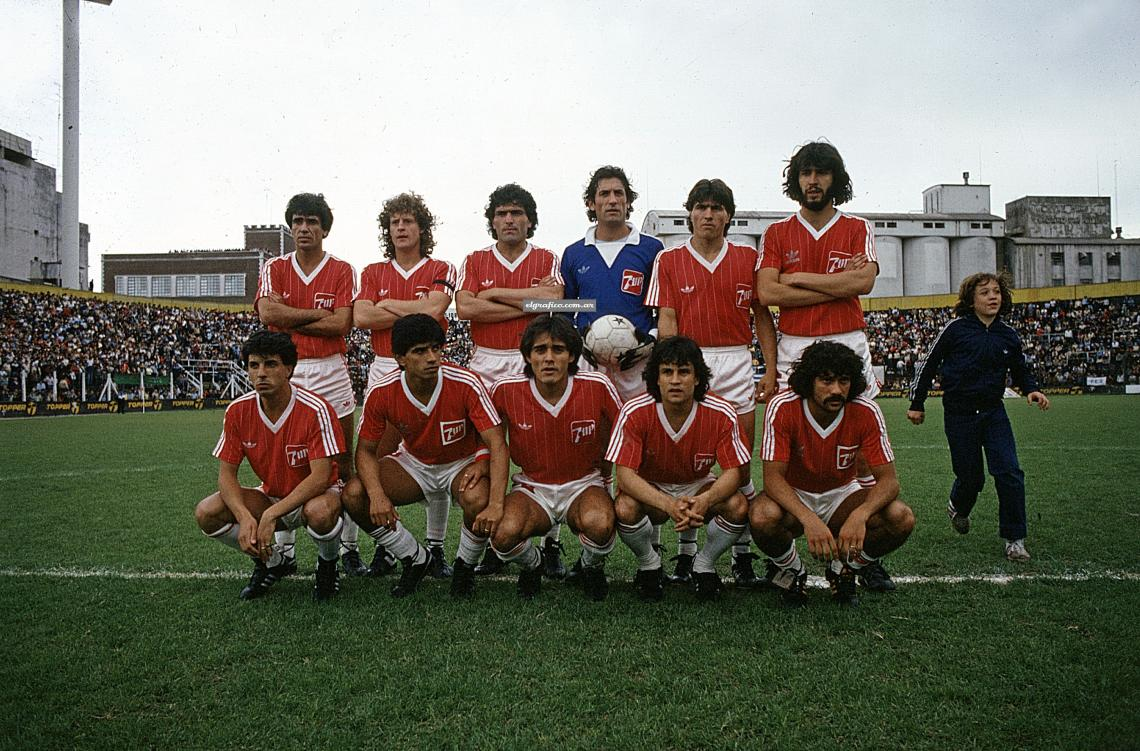
- Argentinos Jrs, Metropolitano champions
- Season: 1984
- Champions: Argentinos Juniors (1st title)
- Relegated: Atlanta; Rosario Central
- 1985 Copa Libertadores: Argentinos Juniors
- Top goalscorer: (Uruguay) Enzo Francescoli (24 goals)

=== League table ===
Pos	Team	Pld	W	D	L	GF	GA	GD	Pts
1	Argentinos Juniors	36	20	11	5	69	36	+33	51
2	Ferro Carril Oeste	36	19	12	5	46	18	+28	50
3	Estudiantes (LP)	36	21	6	9	49	27	+22	48
4	River Plate	36	15	13	8	51	38	+13	43
5	Racing (C)	36	16	11	9	42	31	+11	43
6	Vélez Sársfield	36	14	14	8	43	32	+11	42
7	Newell's Old Boys	36	17	4	15	36	39	−3	38
8	San Lorenzo	36	11	15	10	47	46	+1	37
9	Talleres (C)	36	11	12	13	56	55	+1	34
10	Chacarita Juniors	36	11	12	13	30	36	−6	34
11	Instituto	36	13	7	16	46	47	−1	33
12	Platense	36	10	13	13	34	45	−11	33
13	Temperley	36	9	13	14	23	28	−5	31
14	Independiente	36	10	11	15	45	59	−14	31
15	Unión	36	11	8	17	43	46	−3	30
16	Boca Juniors	36	10	10	16	34	49	−15	30
17	Huracán	36	9	9	18	36	55	−19	27
18	Rosario Central	36	7	11	18	27	41	−14	25
19	Atlanta	36	8	8	20	32	61	−29	24

=== Relegation table ===
Team	1982	1983	1984	Total points	Seasons	Points average
Estudiantes (LP)	54	38	48	140	3	46.66
Ferro Carril Oeste	37	46	50	133	3	44.33
Independiente	52	48	31	131	3	43.67
Vélez Sársfield	42	44	42	128	3	42.67
San Lorenzo	N/A	47	37	84	2	42.00
Newell's Old Boys	44	35	38	117	3	39.00
Argentinos Juniors	28	36	51	115	3	38.33
Boca Juniors	48	37	30	115	3	38.33
Racing (C)	39	27	43	109	3	36.33
River Plate	34	29	43	106	3	35.33
Chacarita Juniors	N/A	N/A	34	34	1	34.00
Instituto	33	35	33	101	3	33.67
Huracán	41	32	27	100	3	33.33
Talleres (C)	33	33	34	100	3	33.33
Temperley	N/A	33	31	64	2	32.00
Platense	28	34	33	95	3	31.67
Unión	27	38	30	95	3	31.67
Rosario Central	37	30	25	92	3	30.67
Atlanta	N/A	N/A	24	24	1	24.00

== See also ==
- 1984 in Argentine football
