= Eduardo Saporiti =

Argentine footballer

Personal information
- Date of birth: 29 December 1954 (age 71)

International career
Years	Team	Apps	(Gls)
1979–1984	Argentina	4	(0)

Eduardo Saporiti (born 29 December 1954) is an Argentine footballer. He played in four matches for the Argentina national football team from 1979 to 1984. He was also part of Argentina's squad for the 1979 Copa América tournament.

== Honours ==
River Plate

- Primera División: 1977 Metropolitano, 1979 Nacional, 1979 Metropolitano, 1980 Metropolitano, 1981 Nacional, 1985–86
- Copa Libertadores: 1986
- Intercontinental Cup: 1986

Racing

- Supercopa Libertadores: 1988
