= Daniel Messina =

Argentine footballer (born 1962)

Personal information
- Full name: Daniel Horacio Messina
- Date of birth: 5 May 1962 (age 64)
- Place of birth: Argentina
- Position: Midfielder

Senior career*
Years	Team	Apps	(Gls)
1981–1983	River Plate		
1984–1985	Vélez Sarsfield		
1985–1987	Huracán		
1988	Blooming		
1989	Elche		
1990	Unión Española		
1990–1991	Huachipato		
1992–1994	Águila		
1994–1995	Lamadrid		
1996	Estudiantes (BA)		
1997	Excursionistas		

Managerial career
- 1999–2002: Excursionistas
- 2002–2003: La Plata FC
- 2004–2005: Acassuso
- 2006: Liniers
- 2007–2008: Deportivo San Martín
- 2009: Midland
- 2010: Riestra
- 2011–2012: Liniers
- 2013: River Plate (youth)
- 2014: Águila
- 2015–2017: Huracán (technical coordinator)
- 2020: Águila
- 2024-2025: Águila
- 2025-2026: Águila (Sporting Director)
- * Club domestic league appearances and goals

Daniel Horacio Messina (born 5 May 1962) is an Argentine football manager and former who played as a midfielder. Since retiring as a player he has coached teams in Argentina and El Salvador.
