= 1979 Argentine Primera División =

88th season of top-tier football league in Argentina

Primera División
- Season: 1979
- Champions: River Plate (Metropolitano and Nacional)

The 1979 Primera División season was the 88th season of top-flight football in Argentina. River Plate won both the Metropolitano and Nacional championship, achieving 19 titles total.

There were three teams relegated, Atlanta, Chacarita Juniors and Gimnasia y Esgrima (LP).

== Metropolitano Championship ==
Metropolitano
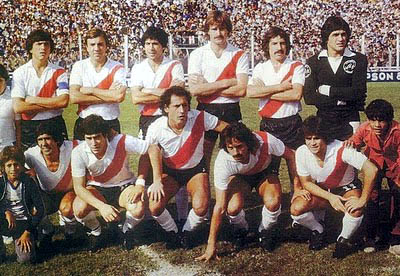
- River Plate, Metropolitano champions
- Season: 1979
- Champions: River Plate (18th title)
- Promoted: Ferro Carril Oeste
- Relegated: Atlanta; Chacarita Juniors; Gim. y Esgrima LP
- 1980 Copa Libertadores: River Plate
- Top goalscorer: (Argentina) Sergio Fortunato (Argentina) Diego Maradona (14 goals each)

=== Group A ===
Pos	Team	Pld	W	D	L	GF	GA	GD	Pts
1	River Plate	18	9	6	3	28	19	+9	24
2	Vélez Sársfield	18	10	3	5	27	20	+7	23
2	Argentinos Juniors	18	10	3	5	34	26	+8	23
4	Newell's Old Boys	18	8	6	4	27	14	+13	22
4	Racing	18	8	6	4	31	20	+11	22
6	Unión	18	6	7	5	23	20	+3	19
7	Quilmes	18	6	5	7	23	20	+3	17
8	Huracán	18	6	4	8	24	31	−7	16
9	Gimnasia y Esgrima (LP)	18	3	2	13	11	28	−17	8
10	Platense	18	2	2	14	15	45	−30	6

2nd place playoff

- Vélez Sársfield 4-0 Argentinos Juniors

=== Group B ===
Pos	Team	Pld	W	D	L	GF	GA	GD	Pts
1	Rosario Central	18	10	6	2	37	17	+20	26
2	Independiente	18	11	2	5	36	25	+11	24
3	Estudiantes (LP)	18	8	6	4	34	27	+7	22
4	Boca Juniors	18	7	6	5	27	19	+8	20
5	Colón	18	6	7	5	24	23	+1	19
5	Ferro Carril Oeste	18	6	7	5	24	28	−4	19
7	San Lorenzo	18	4	9	5	28	25	+3	17
8	All Boys	18	5	5	8	17	28	−11	15
9	Atlanta	18	0	9	9	10	23	−13	9
9	Chacarita Juniors	18	2	5	11	15	37	−22	9

=== Semifinals ===
Club	-	Club	1st leg	2nd leg
River Plate	-	Independiente	4-3	2-1
Rosario Central	-	Vélez Sársfield	0-1	0-0

=== Metropolitano finals ===
Club	-	Club	1st leg	2nd leg
Vélez Sársfield	-	River Plate	0-2	1-5

== Nacional Championship ==
Nacional
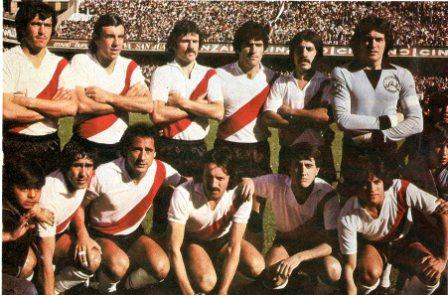
- River Plate, Nacional champions
- Season: 1979
- Champions: River Plate (19th title)
- 1980 Copa Libertadores: Vélez Sársfield
- Top goalscorer: (Argentina) Diego Maradona (12 goals)

=== Group A ===
Pos	Team	Pld	W	D	L	GF	GA	GD	Pts
1	Vélez Sársfield	14	7	5	2	26	15	+11	19
2	Unión	14	6	5	3	20	13	+7	17
2	Ferro Carril Oeste	14	6	5	3	22	17	+5	17
2	San Martín (T)	14	5	7	2	20	18	+2	17
5	Independiente	14	7	1	6	26	22	+4	15
6	Alianza Juventud Pringles (Note: From San Luis Province)	14	3	5	6	15	21	−6	11
7	Ledesma	14	0	4	10	12	33	−21	4

=== Group B ===
Pos	Team	Pld	W	D	L	GF	GA	GD	Pts
1	Talleres (C)	14	8	4	2	31	20	+11	20
2	River Plate	14	7	4	3	26	14	+12	18
3	Huracán	14	6	5	3	29	22	+7	17
4	Newell's Old Boys	14	6	4	4	29	20	+9	16
5	Quilmes	14	4	2	8	14	18	−4	10
5	Kimberley	14	4	2	8	19	29	−10	10
7	Gimnasia y Tiro	14	1	3	10	10	37	−27	5

=== Group C ===
Pos	Team	Pld	W	D	L	GF	GA	GD	Pts
1	Racing	14	6	5	3	24	17	+7	17
1	Atético Tucumán	14	6	5	3	22	15	+7	17
3	Argentinos Juniors	14	5	5	4	20	14	+6	15
3	Colón	14	5	5	4	19	17	+2	15
5	All Boys	14	4	4	6	12	18	−6	12
6	Independiente Rivadavia	14	3	5	6	13	20	−7	11
7	Altos Hornos Zapla	14	2	5	7	13	24	−11	9

=== Group D ===
Pos	Team	Pld	W	D	L	GF	GA	GD	Pts
1	Instituto	14	7	4	3	24	11	+13	18
1	Rosario Central	14	7	4	3	25	15	+10	18
3	Boca Juniors	14	5	7	2	15	11	+4	17
4	San Lorenzo	14	6	4	4	23	11	+12	16
5	Estudiantes (LP)	14	7	0	7	24	21	+3	14
6	Chaco For Ever	14	4	2	8	13	30	−17	10
7	Cipolletti	14	2	3	9	11	34	−23	7

=== Quarterfinals ===
Club	-	Club	1st leg	2nd leg
Instituto	-	Atético Tucumán	3-2	0-3
Unión	-	Talleres (C)	3-0	0-2
Vélez Sársfield	-	River Plate	1-0	0-1 (PK 3-4)
Racing	-	Rosario Central	1-3	0-3

=== Semifinals ===
Club	-	Club	1st leg	2nd leg
River Plate	-	Rosario Central	4-0	3-1
Atético Tucumán	-	Unión	0-2	0-2

=== Nacional finals ===
Club	-	Club	1st leg	2nd leg
Unión	-	River Plate	1-1	0-0
