= Juan Domingo Rocchia =

Argentine footballer and manager

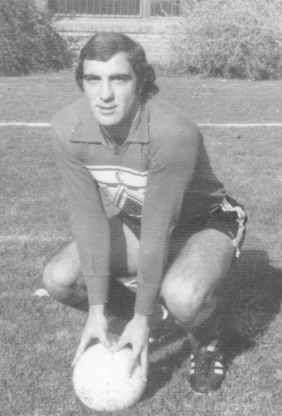
- Rocchia in Ferro Carril Oeste colours

Personal information
- Full name: Juan Domingo Antonio Rocchia
- Date of birth: June 13, 1951
- Place of birth: Rafaela, Santa Fe, Argentina
- Position: Central defender

Senior career*
Years	Team	Apps	(Gls)
1970–1972	Racing Club	52	(23)
1973–1983	Ferro Carril Oeste	377	(78)

International career
1975	Argentina	?	(?)
- * Club domestic league appearances and goals as of August 28, 2007

Juan Domingo Antonio Rocchia is a retired professional footballer. He played for Racing Club and Ferro Carril Oeste in the Argentine Primera.

He played in central defence and he formed a famous partnership with Héctor Cúper in his time at Ferro Carril Oeste. He played 377 games for Ferro, putting him 6th on their all time appearances list.

His nickname was Burro (Donkey), he was a combative player and scored 78 goals in his career. He is Ferro Carril Oeste's 4th highest goalscorer of all time.

Roccia played for the Argentina national football team in 1975 under the managership of César Luis Menotti.

In 1982, he was an integral part of the Ferro Carril Oeste team that became only the second team after San Lorenzo to win the Primera without losing a single game.

In 1981, he helped goalkeeper Carlos Barisio set an Argentine record of 1,075 minutes without conceding a goal.

== Titles ==
Season	Club	Title
1978	Ferro Carril Oeste	Primera B Nacional
Nacional 1982	Ferro Carril Oeste	Primera División Argentina

== Coaching career ==
Rocchia was joint manager of Ferro between 1999 and 2000 with Jorge Brandoni.
