= Carlos Barisio =

Argentine footballer (1951–2020)

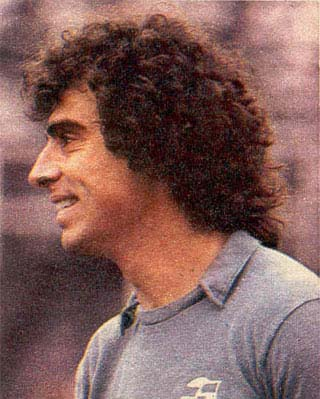

Personal information
- Full name: Carlos José Barisio
- Date of birth: 3 January 1951
- Place of birth: San Fernando, Buenos Aires, Argentina
- Date of death: 5 February 2020 (aged 69)
- Position: Goalkeeper

Senior career*
| Years | Team | Apps | (Gls) |
| 1968–1974 | River Plate | 26 | (0) |
| 1975 | Gimnasia de La Plata | 45 | (0) |
| 1976–1978 | All Boys | 59 | (0) |
| 1978–1983 | Ferro Carril Oeste | 140 | (0) |
| 1983 | Boca Juniors | 3 | (0) |
| 1984 | Deportivo Armenio | ? | (?) |
| 1986–1987 | Chacarita Juniors | ? | (?) |
| 1988–1989 | Belgrano de Parana | | |
- * Club domestic league appearances and goals as of May 2007

Carlos José Barisio (3 January 1951 – 5 February 2020) was a professional goalkeeper, born in San Fernando, Buenos Aires. He retired from football in 1987, after amassing 271 appearances in the Argentinian Primera.

His greatest achievement came as a Ferro Carril Oeste player in 1981, when he set the Primera record for the longest period without letting in a goal. He went 1,075 minutes without conceding, this consisted of 10 complete games and 2 partial games.

In 1982, he was the goalkeeper when Ferro Carril Oeste became only the second team after San Lorenzo to win the Primera without losing a single game.

== Titles ==
| Season | Club | Title |
|---|---|---|
| Nacional 1982 | Ferro Carril Oeste | Primera Division Argentina |
