= Ferro Carril Oeste =

Argentine sports club

- Full name: Club Ferro Carril Oeste
- Nicknames: El Verde (The Green); Verdolaga; El Expreso Oeste (The Western Express); El Expreso de Caballito (The Caballito Express); Oeste (West)
- Founded: 28 July 1904; 122 years ago
- Ground: Ricardo Etcheverri, Caballito, Buenos Aires
- Capacity: 17,000
- Chairman: Guillermo Bameule
- Manager: Juan Manuel Sara
- League: Primera Nacional
- 2025: Primera Nacional Zone A, 12th of 18
- Website: ferrocarriloeste.org.ar
Home colours	Away colours	Third colours

Club Ferro Carril Oeste, known simply as Ferro Carril Oeste or familiarly, Ferro, is an Argentine sports club from the neighbourhood of Caballito, Buenos Aires. Although many activities are hosted by the club, Ferro is mostly known for its football team, which plays in the Primera Nacional, the second division of the Argentine football league system.

Apart from football, Ferro Carril Oeste hosts a wide variety of sports that can be practised at the club, such as athletics, basketball, baseball, futsal, handball, field hockey, swimming, taekwondo, tennis, table tennis, volleyball. and, since 2001, professional boxing shows, including world championship boxing contests.

As its name indicates, the club had railway origins, being founded in 1904 by employees of the Buenos Aires Western Railway. The club had its glory days in the 1980s, having won numerous titles in several sports disciplines, being also recognised by Unesco as a model institution. Ferro Carril Oeste had 50,000 members by those years.

== History ==
=== The beginning ===
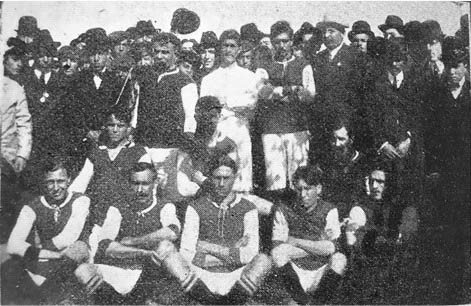
Ferro Carril Oeste in 1907, wearing the maroon and light blue jersey based on English club Aston Villa.

Always located in Caballito, the club was founded as "Club Atlético del Ferrocarril Oeste de Buenos Aires" on 28 July 1904, by a hundred employees of the Buenos Aires Western Railway (then Ferrocarril Domingo Faustino Sarmiento). The club was approved and supported by railway managers, so Ferro soon incorporated lands to build its headquarters and sports installations. In 1905 the club built its own stadium, Estadio Arquitecto Ricardo Etcheverry, financed by its main founding member, David Simpson. Ferro affiliated to the Argentine Football Association to register a team to play in the third division.

The first official match was played on 21 April 1907 v River Plate. In 1912, Ferro won the División Intermedia (then, the second division) title and promoted to Primera División. That same year the club won the Copa Bullrich title. Ferro C. Oeste would win another Copa Bullrich title the following year, but playing with reserve teams.

Ferro debuted in the top division in 1913 v Riachuelo (1–1 draw). By those years, the club also inaugurated running tracks, bocce, tennis courts, basque pelota courts but also closed the cricket section in 1914.

=== The Five Musketeers ===
At the end of the 1930s, the club emancipated from the railway company, changing its name to "Club Ferro Carril Oeste". In 1937 five talented players rose from the youth divisions, forming an offensive line which would be remembered as The Five Musketeers. They were Bernardo Gandulla, Juan José Maril, Luis Borgnia, Jaime Sarlanga and Raúl Emeal. But those skilled players only played together between 1937 and 1938, due to other clubs acquiring them (Sarlanga would have a memorable run with Boca Juniors). Both Gandulla and Sarlanga together scored more than the 50% of the goals scored by Ferro in the 1937 season.

Other notable player for the club was Delfín Benítez Cáceres, who played from 1941 until his retirement in 1944 scoring 20 goals. Gandulla and Emeal returned to Ferro in 1944 after their stint with Boca Juniors. But despite having such prominent players, Ferro finished last in 1946 and was relegated to Primera B for the first time in its history.

Apart from football, the club added several sections to its range of sports disciplines, such as swimming, water polo, and chess (starting after the club affiliated to Argentine Chess Federation). In 1933, Ferro C.O. formed its first basketball team. In the 1940s, Ferro also added fencing and roller skating. As a result, the club increased its number of members, with more than 6,000 by 1941.

=== 1950–1970 ===
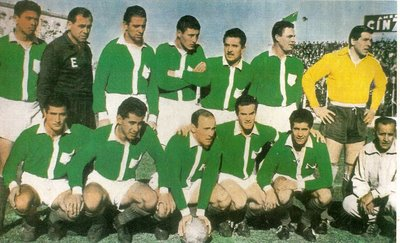
The 1958 team that won the Primera B championship

Ferro soon returned to the first division in 1949, when winning the Primera B title. Being presided by Atilio Renzi (a politician affiliated to Justicialist Party and private secretary of Eva Perón), the club added volleyball to its list of sports. The football team stayed in Primera until 1957, when its poor performance during that championship caused Ferro C.O. was relegated for the second time in its history. Ferro only lasted one year in Primera B, returning in 1958 when the squad crowned champion. Ferro totalised 50 points in 34 matches played, followed by Nueva Chicago with 46.

In the 1959 Primera División, Ferro finished 4th, being the best position in the top division until then. After being relegated again, Ferro won the Primera B championship in 1963, returning to Primera División. In the top level, Ferro reached another 4th place in the 1965 tournament. Ferro would be relegated again in 1968 after playing a "Reclasificatorio" tournament. In the 1969 Primera B season, Ferro C.O. won the tournament (with San Telmo as runner up) but none of them could promote to Primera after they lost in the Reclasificatorio tournament to Banfield and Deportivo Morón (the worst placed teams in 1969 Metropolitano).

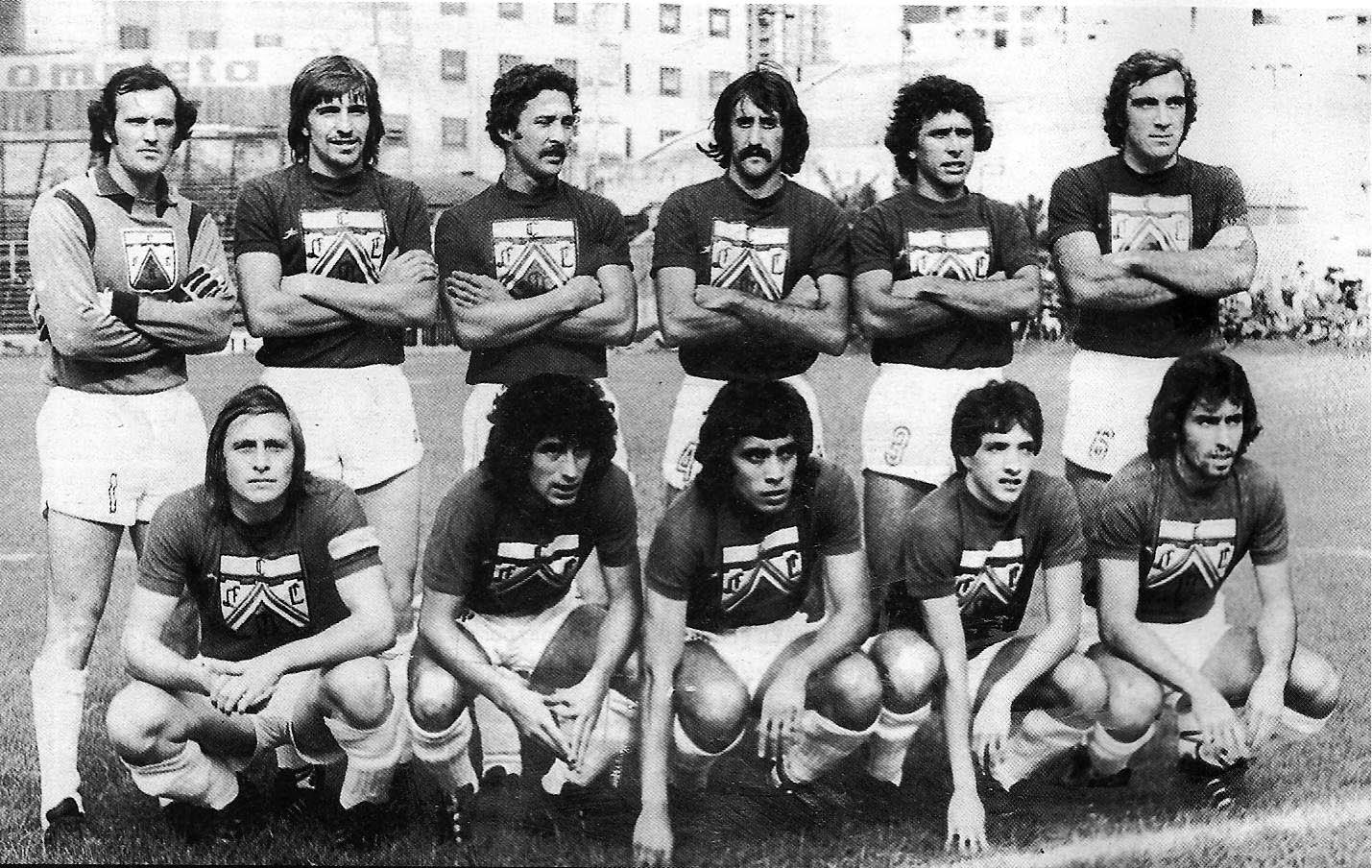
The Ferro C. Oeste squad in 1978 that won the Primera B title

Following with the good performance in 1969 season, Ferro C.O. won its second consecutive Primera B title in 1970, directly promoting to Primera División to play the 1971 season. By 1972, the club had 17,299 members and inaugurated the Gimnasio Héctor Etchart, home venue for the basketball team. In 1974 Ferro wore an orange jersey, paying tribute to World sub-champion Netherlands national football team, The Clockwork Orange, finishing 6th in the Torneo Nacional disputed that year. Gerónimo Saccardi was one of the most notable players for the club during those years. After some irregular campaigns, Ferro finished 23rd (last) in 1977, being relegated along with Lanús and Temperley.

Ferro C. Oeste quickly returning to Primera so the team won the Primera B championship in 1978.

=== The Golden Age: 1980s ===
Ferro had a prominent role in Argentine sports in the 1980s, more specifically in football and basketball. The football team won 2 titles of Argentine Primera División and played the Copa Libertadores. Otherwise, the basketball team won the Liga Nacional de Básquet (the Argentine first division league) championship 3 times.

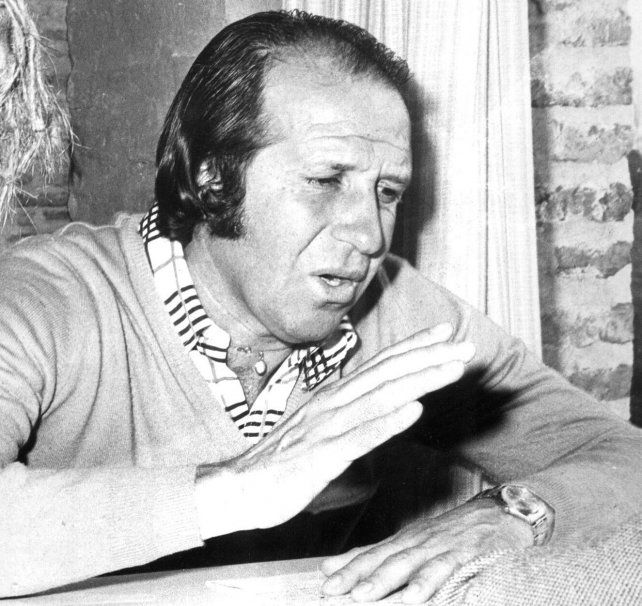
Carlos Griguol (here in 1978) lead Ferro C.O. to win their first titles in Primera División during his two tenures on the club

In 1979 Carlos Griguol was hired as club manager. He would become the most successful coach in the club's history, winning 2 Primera División titles for the first time and also promoting players such as Alberto Márcico, Héctor Cúper and Oscar Garré. In the 1981 Metropolitano championship Ferro finished 2nd, totalling 49 points, just one less than champion Boca Juniors. In that season, goalkeeper Carlos Barisio set a national record by keeping his goal unbeaten for 1,075 minutes. This included a run of 10 complete games without conceding a goal. That same year Ferro reached the Torneo Nacional final although the team was defeated by River Plate (by the same score: 1–0 in the two matches played).

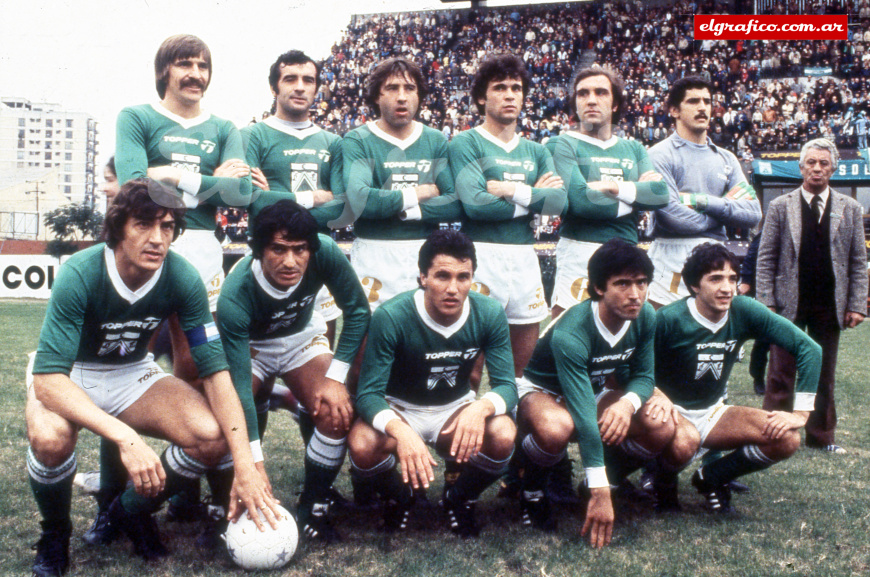
In 1982, Ferro C. Oeste won its first title in Primera División

Ferro finally won its first title at Primera in 1982, winning the Nacional tournament after beating defending champions Quilmes in the finals (0–0, 2–0). The squad played a total of 22 matches, winning 16 with 6 draws so they won the championship remaining unbeaten. Ferro scored 50 goals and conceded 13. Left wing Miguel Angel Juárez was the top scorer with 22 goals. Other notable players for the champion team were Adolfino Cañete, Alberto Márcico, Juan Domingo Rocchia, and Héctor Cúper.

Although some key players during the 1982 tournament (Saccardi, Rocchia, Crocco) had left the club, Ferro won another Torneo Nacional in 1984, defeating River Plate (with Norberto Alonso and Enzo Francescoli) winning the two finals (3–0 and 1–0). The team played 14 matches, winning 8 and losing only 1, with 5 draws. Ferro scored 32 goals and only conceded 9, with Márcico being the top scorer with 5 goals. As one of the Argentine champions, Ferro debuted in Copa Libertadores playing the 1983 edition in a group with Estudiantes LP, and Chilean teams Colo Colo and Cobreloa, being eliminated after finishing last.

The good performances by the squad in local football followed in the 1984 Metropolitano, where Ferro C.O. finished 2nd. (50 pts) after Argentinos Juniors (51 pts). Ferro returned to international competitions to play the 1985 Copa Libertadores, being eliminated in the first stage.

During the 1980s, Ferro gained recognition not only in football but also in basketball, being the first winner of the recently created Liga Nacional in 1985 after beating Atenas 2–1 in the finals. Santiago Leyden was the president between 1964 and 1993. He is regarded as the man who led the club to a decade of greatness that included more than 100 titles in several sports disciplines. Leyden was also vicepresident of CONMEBOL between 1976 and 1980. Also in the 1980s. Ferro Carril Oeste reached its peak as sports and social club, with more than 50,000 members and was proclaimed as a "model institution" by Unesco.

In 1987 Carlos Griguol left the club, and was hired by River Plate. He had won 2 titles in the first division (who still are the only two championships won by Ferro at the top level of Argentine football) and 2 sub-championships. Griguol returned in 1988, coaching Ferro until 1993.

=== Decline ===
On the other hand, Ferro had the longest run without scoring a goal. The team went 875 minutes without scoring between the end of the 1998 Apertura and the 1999 Clausura. The run was cut in a match v River Plate, when Christian Chaparro scored for his team.

In the 1990s, Ferro's form gradually declined and relegated to the third division (Primera B Metropolitana) in 2001 after two consecutive relegations. Ferro finally returned to the second division two years later.

Ferro has a strong rivalry with Vélez Sársfield, so both teams disputed what is known as Clásico del Oeste.

== Team image ==
=== Uniform ===
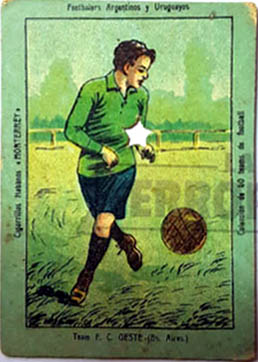
An early Argentine cigarette card c. 1910, showing the Ferro C. Oeste green shirt

According to some historians of the club, the first acts stated that the uniform was a white shirt with a red crest bearing the club's initials, inspired on the colors of the flag of England so the first executives of Ferro C. Oeste were English. Nevertheless, many workers of the Buenos Aires Western Railway (whose workers had founded the club) were Irish. The club then switched to a garnet shirt with light blue sleeves similar to Aston Villa shirt, donated by some English sailors that had played a friendly match against Ferro.

In 1910 Ferro C. Oeste affiliated to the Argentine Football Association and the idea of those Irish employees prevailed, so a green shirt was registered with the AFA (as Nile green). That would remain as the definitive color for the club, worn up to present days.

The club has also worn different designs (as alternate jerseys) over the years, such as a green and white square shirt (in 1952), another model similar to the Celtic F.C. shirt (that was European Cup reigning champion by then) in 1966, and even an orange shirt, inspired on the Netherlands national football team that had had an outstanding performance at the 1974 World Cup, it was worn only once that same year in a match v Rosario Central.

1904–07	1907–11	1911–present

== Players ==
=== Current squad ===
As of 22 October 2026

Note: Flags indicate national team as defined under FIFA eligibility rules; some limited exceptions apply. Players may hold more than one non-FIFA nationality.

No.	Pos.	Nation	Player
—	GK	ARG	Fernando Monetti
—	GK	ARG	Lucas Ruiz
—	DF	ARG	Gustavo Canto
—	DF	ARG	Sebastián Corda
—	DF	ARG	Nazareno Kihm
—	DF	ARG	Juan Orellana (loan from San Martín de Tucumán)
—	DF	ARG	Leandro Peña Biafore
—	DF	ARG	Misael Tarón
—	DF	ARG	Federico Tévez (loan from Tigre)
—	DF	ARG	Fernando Torrent
—	DF	ARG	Matías Zubowicz
—	MF	ARG	Martín Campos
—	MF	ARG	Gonzalo Castellani
—	MF	ARG	Sebastián Flores

No.	Pos.	Nation	Player
—	MF	ARG	Santiago García
—	MF	ARG	Nicolás Gómez
—	MF	ARG	Enzo Hoyos (loan from Deportes Iquique)
—	MF	ARG	Matías Kabalin
—	MF	ARG	Laureano Marra
—	MF	ARG	Felipe Obradovich
—	MF	ARG	Gino Olguín
—	MF	ARG	Emiliano Ozuna
—	FW	ARG	Emanuel Dening
—	FW	URU	Franco García
—	FW	ARG	Ángel González
—	FW	ARG	Jonathan Menéndez
—	FW	ARG	Lautaro Parisi
—	FW	ARG	Nicolás Reniero

=== Out on loan ===
Note: Flags indicate national team as defined under FIFA eligibility rules; some limited exceptions apply. Players may hold more than one non-FIFA nationality.

No. / Pos. / Nation / Player	No. / Pos. / Nation / Player

=== Notable former players ===
- (Argentina) Bernardo Gandulla (1934–39)
- (Argentina) Jaime Sarlanga (1937–39)
- (Paraguay) Delfín Benítez Cáceres (1941–44)
- (Argentina) Vicente Gambardella (1960)
- (Argentina) Gerónimo Saccardi (1969–75, 1979–83)
- (Argentina) Juan Domingo Rocchia (1973–83)
- (Argentina) Oscar Garré (1974–88)
- (Argentina) Héctor Cúper (1976–77, 1978–88)
- (Argentina) Carlos Barisio (1978–83)
- (Argentina) Alberto Márcico (1980–85)
- (Paraguay) Adolfino Cañete (1980–84)
- (Argentina) Carlos Moya

== Managers ==
- (Argentina) Mario Fortunato (1937), (1953)
- (Argentina) Pedro Dellacha (1965)
- (Argentina) Victorio Spinetto (1973–76)
- (Argentina) Carlos Griguol (1979–87), (1988–93)
- (Argentina) Gerónimo Saccardi (1997–99)
- (Argentina) Rubén Darío Insúa (1999)
- (Argentina) Héctor Rivoira (2004–05)
- (Argentina) José Luis Brown (2007–08)
- (Argentina) Carlos Trullet (2008–09)
- (Argentina) Jorge Luis Ghiso (2009)
- (Argentina) Dalcio Giovagnoli (2010)
- (Argentina) Mario Gómez (2011–12)
- (Argentina) José Luis Brown (2013)
- (Argentina) José Romero (2014)
- (Argentina) Marcelo Broggi (2015)
- (Argentina) Walter Perazzo (2016)
- (Argentina) Marcelo Broggi (2017–18)
- (Uruguay) Alejandro Orfila (2018)
- (Argentina) Jorge Cordon (2018–20)
- (Argentina) Diego Osella (2020-)

== Honours ==
=== League ===
- Primera División (2): 1982 Nacional, 1984 Nacional
- Primera División B (5): 1958, 1963, 1969, 1970, 1978
- División Intermedia (1): 1912
- Primera B Metropolitana (1): 2002–03

=== Cups ===
- Copa Bullrich (Note: The Copa Bullrich was an official football competition contested by clubs playing in the Second Division. The AFA has not included this competition into the list of national cups because only teams in Primera División participated in those competitions.) (2): 1912, 1913 (Note: Ferro fielded a reserve team to play the competition.)

=== Friendly ===
- Copa El Diario (1): 1908

== Other sports ==
=== Basketball ===
Ferro Carril Oeste was one of the most successful basketball clubs in Argentina during the 1980s, being the first champion of Liga Nacional de Básquet in 1985. The club has won a total of three LNB and one Campeonato Argentino title.

At international level, Ferro won three South American Championship titles (being also the first Argentine team to win that competition). Ferro remains (along with Boca Juniors) as the most winning Argentine team.

2019–20 Ferro Carril Oeste season

=== Volleyball ===
==== Honours ====
Men's team

- Primera División (6): 1977, 1980, 1981, 1983, 1984, 1985
- Copa Morgan (7): 1966, 1977, 1977, 1983, 1984, 1985, 1986
- Campeonato Sudamericano (2): 1987, 1998

Women's team

- Primera División (8): 1979, 1980, 1981, 1982, 1983, 1984, 1985, 1990
- Copa Morgan (11): 1977, 1978, 1980, 1981, 1983, 1984, 1986, 1987, 1988, 1998, 2004
