= Julio César Jiménez =

Uruguayan footballer (born 1954)

Personal information
- Full name: Julio César Jiménez Tejito
- Date of birth: 27 August 1954 (age 72)
- Place of birth: Artigas, Uruguay
- Position: Midfielder

International career
Years	Team	Apps	(Gls)
- Uruguay

Julio César Jiménez Tejito (also spelled Giménez, born 27 August 1954) is a Uruguayan former professional footballer with Uruguayan club C.A. Peñarol and was part of the Uruguayan Squad at the World Cup in Germany in 1974. He played as a midfielder.
