= Gerónimo Saccardi =

Argentine footballer and manager

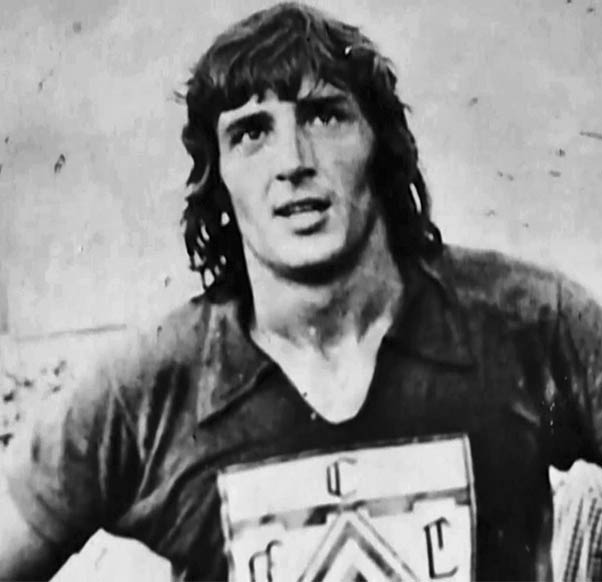
- Saccardi with Ferro Carril Oeste in 1974

Personal information
- Full name: Gerónimo Luis Saccardi Román
- Date of birth: 1 October 1949
- Place of birth: Buenos Aires, Argentina
- Date of death: 4 May 2002 (aged 52)
- Place of death: Moreno, Argentina
- Position: Midfielder

Youth career
- Ferro Carril Oeste

Senior career*
Years	Team	Apps	(Gls)
1969–1975	Ferro Carril Oeste		
1975–1979	Hércules	113	(12)
1979–1983	Ferro Carril Oeste		

International career
1974	Argentina	2	(0)

Managerial career
- 1997–1999: Ferro Carril Oeste
- ?–?: Gimnasia y Esgrima (Jujuy)
- * Club domestic league appearances and goals

Gerónimo Luis Saccardi Román (1 October 1949 – 4 May 2002) was an Argentine football midfielder and manager.

== Club career ==
Born Buenos Aires, Saccardi played the vast majority of his career with Ferro Carril Oeste, appearing in 358 games in the Primera División and scoring 44 goals for his main club overall.

From 1975 to 1979 Saccardi competed in Spain in representation of Hércules CF, always in La Liga. After his second spell in Ferro (four seasons, ten in total) he later managed the team, first alongside Oscar Garré then as head coach.

== Death ==
Saccardi died on 4 May 2002 in Moreno, Buenos Aires. He was 52 years old.
