= Adolfino Cañete =

Paraguayan footballer (born 1956)

Personal information
- Full name: Adolfino Cañete Azcurra
- Date of birth: 13 September 1956 (age 70)
- Place of birth: Asunción, Paraguay
- Height: 1.72 m (5 ft 8 in)
- Position: Midfielder

Senior career*
Years	Team	Apps	(Gls)
- General Caballero
- River Plate Asunción
- Sol de América
1980–1984	Ferrocarril Oeste	211	(31)
1984–1986	Cruz Azul	38	(2)
1987	Unión Magdalena	7	(0)
1987–1988	Textil Mandiyú	34	(3)
1988–1990	Talleres de Córdoba	62	(13)
1990	Cobreloa		
1991	Lanús	15	(2)
1991–1993	Colón de Santa Fe	82	(14)

International career
1985–1989	Paraguay	29	(3)
- * Club domestic league appearances and goals

Adolfino Cañete Azcurra (born 13 September 1956) is a retired professional Paraguayan footballer. He was part of the 1986 Paraguay national team that played in the World Cup that year at Mexico. Cañete was credited with three assists during that World Cup.

== Career ==
Cañete played for many clubs during his career, including Mexican side Cruz Azul and in Argentina, Ferro Carril Oeste, Talleres de Córdoba and Club Atlético Lanús. Cañete played in the central midfield for Ferro during the early 1980s, helping the club win its first two Argentine Primera División titles: the Torneo Nacional in 1982 and 1984.

Cañete made 29 appearances for the Paraguay national football team from 1985 to 1989.
