= 1990–91 in Australian soccer =

Soccer in Australia
- Season: 1990–91

Men's soccer
- NSL Premiership: Melbourne Croatia
- NSL Championship: South Melbourne
- NSL Cup: Melita Eagles

The 1990–91 season was the 22nd season of national competitive soccer in Australia and 108th overall.

== National teams ==
=== Australia men's national soccer team ===
==== Results and fixtures ====
===== Friendlies =====
6 September 1990	South Korea	1–0	Australia	Seoul, South Korea
	Byung-joo 17'	Report		Stadium: Tongdaemun Stadium; Attendance: 18,000; Referee: Kil Ki-Chul (South Korea)

9 September 1990	South Korea	1–0	Australia	Pusan, South Korea
	Byung-joo 17'	Report		Stadium: Kudok Stadium; Attendance: 20,000; Referee: Choi Kil-Soo (South Korea)

30 January 1991	Australia	0–1	Czechoslovakia	Melbourne, Australia
		Report	Krištofík 44'	Stadium: Olympic Park; Attendance: 6,854; Referee: Chris Bambridge (Australia)

6 February 1991	Australia	0–2	Czechoslovakia	Sydney, Australia
		Report	Kula 59'; Grussmann 87'	Stadium: Parramatta Stadium; Attendance: 8,221; Referee: John McConnell (Australia)

1 June 1991	Australia	0–1	England	Sydney, Australia
		Report	Gray 40' (o.g.)	Stadium: Sydney Football Stadium; Attendance: 35,742; Referee: Barry Tasker (New Zealand

===== 1990 Indonesian Independence Cup =====
25 August 1990 Final	Indonesia	0–3	Australia	Jakarta, Indonesia
		Report	Wade 55', 76'; Zinni 63'	Stadium: Senayan Stadium; Attendance: 20,000; Referee: N. Yasunori (Japan)

===== 1991 Trans-Tasman Cup =====
12 May 1991	New Zealand	0–1	Australia	Christchurch, New Zealand
		Report	Milosevic 44'	Stadium: QEII Stadium; Attendance: 8,000; Referee: Gary Fleet (New Zealand)

15 May 1991	Australia	2–1	New Zealand	Adelaide, Australia
	Petersen 46'; Vidmar 50'	Report	Roberts 75'	Stadium: Hindmarsh Stadium; Attendance: 6,500; Referee: Bill Monteverde (Australia)

===== 1991 President's Cup International Football Tournament =====
14 June 1991 Semi-finals	South Korea	0–0 (a.e.t.) (3–4 p)	Australia	Seoul, South Korea
		Report		Stadium: Tongdaemun Stadium; Attendance: 16,000; Referee: Witaya Wongsmarn (Thailand)
	Penalties
	Wade (penalty scored); Arnold (penalty missed); Blagojevic (penalty scored); Milosevic (penalty scored); Vidmar (penalty missed)		(penalty scored) Seok-ju; (penalty scored) Dae-shik; (penalty missed) Deok-yeo; (penalty scored) Jeong-woon; (penalty scored) Kang-hee

=== Australia women's national soccer team ===
==== Results and fixtures ====
===== 1991 OFC Women's Championship =====
Pos	Team	Pld	W	D	L	GF	GA	GD	Pts	Qualification
1	New Zealand (C)	4	3	0	1	28	1	+27	6	Qualification for 1991 FIFA Women's World Cup
2	Australia (H)	4	3	0	1	21	1	+20	6	
3	Papua New Guinea	4	0	0	4	0	47	−47	0	

Source: RSSSF
(C) Champions; (H) Hosts

20 May 1991	New Zealand	1–0	Australia	Sydney, Australia
	Sharpe 66'	Report		Stadium: Marconi Stadium

21 May 1991	Australia	12–0	Papua New Guinea	Sydney, Australia
	Hughes ?', ?', ?', ?'; Iannotta ?', ?'; Wass ?', ?'; Gegenhuber ?'; Tann ?'; Bartlett ?'; (unknown) ?'	Report		Stadium: Marconi Stadium

24 May 1991	New Zealand	0–1	Australia	Sydney, Australia
		Report	Dodd 8'	Stadium: Marconi Stadium

25 May 1991	Australia	8–0	Papua New Guinea	Sydney, Australia
		Report	Vinson ?', ?', ?', ?', ?', ?'; Hughes ?', ?'	Stadium: Marconi Stadium

=== Australia men's national under-20 soccer team ===
==== Results and fixtures ====
===== 1991 FIFA World Youth Championship =====
====== Group C ======
Pos	Team	Pld	W	D	L	GF	GA	GD	Pts	Qualification
1	Australia	3	3	0	0	4	0	+4	6	Advance to knockout stage
2	Soviet Union	3	2	0	1	5	1	+4	4	Advance to knockout stage
3	Egypt	3	1	0	2	6	2	+4	2	
4	Trinidad and Tobago	3	0	0	3	0	12	−12	0	

Source: RSSSF

15 June 1991	Trinidad and Tobago	0–2	Australia	Braga, Portugal
19:30		Report	Okon 52'; Seal 76'	Stadium: Estádio Primeiro de Maio; Attendance: 1,720; Referee: Alberto Tejada (Peru)

18 June 1991	Australia	1–0	Soviet Union	Braga, Portugal
21:30	Maloney 21'	Report		Stadium: Estádio Primeiro de Maio; Attendance: 10,000; Referee: Bernd Heynemann (Germany)

20 June 1991	Australia	1–0	Egypt	Guimarães, Portugal
17:00	Trajanovski 43'	Report		Stadium: Estádio D. Afonso Henriques; Attendance: 10,000; Referee: Francisco Oscar Lamolina (Argentina)

====== Knockout stage ======
23 June 1991 Quarter-finals	Australia	1–1 (a.e.t.) (5–4 p)	Syria	Braga, Portugal
17:00	Seal 20'	Report	Mando 56'	Stadium: Estádio Primeiro de Maio; Attendance: 10,000; Referee: Renato Marsiglia (Brazil)
	Penalties
	Seal (penalty scored); Okon (penalty scored); Kindtner (penalty missed); Muscat (penalty scored); Babic (penalty scored); Stanton (penalty scored)		(penalty scored) F. Mando; (penalty missed) Khalifa; (penalty scored) Ghaeb; (penalty scored) Abdul Razak; (penalty scored) Ramadan; (penalty missed) Sibai

26 June 1991 Semi-finals	Portugal	1–0	Australia	Lisbon, Portugal
21:30	Costa 31'	Report		Stadium: Estádio da Luz; Attendance: 112,000; Referee: Sándor Puhl (Hungary)

29 June 1991 Third place play-off	Australia	1–1 (a.e.t.) (4–5 p)	Soviet Union	Porto, Portugal
21:30	Seal 87'	Report	Scherbakov 39' (pen.)	Stadium: Estádio das Antas; Attendance: 6,000; Referee: Idrissa Sarr (Mauritania)
	Penalties
	Seal (penalty missed); Okon (penalty scored); Corica (penalty scored); Babic (penalty scored); Popovic (penalty scored); Stanton (penalty missed)		(penalty missed) Pokhlebayev; (penalty scored) Bushmanov; (penalty scored) Babalaryan; (penalty scored) Mamchur; (penalty scored) Scherbakov; (penalty scored) Minko

===== 1990 OFC U-20 Championship =====
====== First round ======
Pos	Team	Pld	W	D	L	GF	GA	GD	Pts	Qualification
1	Australia	4	4	0	0	22	0	+22	8	Advance to Inter-continental play-off
2	New Zealand	4	2	0	2	5	9	−4	4	
3	Vanuatu	4	2	0	2	4	10	−6	4	
4	Tahiti	4	1	1	2	3	10	−7	3	
5	Fiji (H)	4	0	1	3	2	7	−5	1	

Source: RSSSF
(H) Hosts

1 September 1990	Australia	6–0	Vanuatu	Ba, Fiji
	Trajanovski 6', 63'; Okon 42'; Seal 72', 82'; Corica 77'	Report		Stadium: Govind Park

3 September 1990	Australia	7–0	Tahiti	Nadi, Fiji
	Bingley 14', 69'; Trajanovski 23', 89'; (unknown) ?' (o.g.); Corica 34', 43'	Report

6 September 1990	Fiji	0–3	Australia	Lautoka, Fiji
		Report	Trajanovski 33'; Kindtner 38'; Okon 50'	Stadium: Churchill Park

8 September 1990	Australia	6–0	New Zealand	Ba, Fiji
	Trajanovski 12'; Seal 41', 48', 77'; Maloney 69', 73'	Report		Stadium: Govind Park

====== Inter-continental qualification ======
6 March 1991	Australia	0–1	Israel	Sydney, Australia
		Report

9 March 1991	Israel	1–2 (2–2 agg.)	Australia	Sydney, Australia
	(unknown) ?'	Report	Seal ?'; Trajanovski ?'

=== Australia men's national under-17 soccer team ===
==== Results and fixtures ====
===== 1991 OFC U-17 Championship =====
Pos	Team	Pld	W	D	L	GF	GA	GD	Pts	Qualification
1	Australia	4	3	1	0	15	4	+11	7	Qualification for 1991 FIFA U-17 World Championship
2	New Zealand (H)	4	2	1	1	9	3	+6	5	
3	Fiji	4	0	0	4	4	21	−17	0	

Source: RSSSF
(H) Hosts

11 January 1991	Australia	6–1	Fiji	Napier, New Zealand
	Kalogeracos 2', 11', 22'; Carbone 17' (pen.); Campagna ?'; Kiratzoglou ?'	Report	Samusamuvodre ?'	Stadium: Park Island

13 January 1991	New Zealand	1–1	Australia	Napier, New Zealand
	Kingi 18'	Report	Kalogeracos 15'	Stadium: Park Island

11 January 1991	Australia	7–2	Fiji	Napier, New Zealand
	Campagna 1'; Kiratzoglou 2', 18', 70'; Healey 19', 23'; Usalj 90'	Report	Pillay 38'; Yakub 67'	Stadium: Park Island

13 January 1991	New Zealand	0–1	Australia	Napier, New Zealand
		Report	Campagna 70'	Stadium: Park Island

== Domestic soccer ==
=== National Soccer League ===
Pos	Team	Pld	W	D	L	GF	GA	GD	Pts	Qualification or relegation
1	Melbourne Croatia	26	15	7	4	55	39	+16	37	Qualification for the Finals series
2	South Melbourne (C)	26	14	6	6	45	33	+12	34	Qualification for the Finals series
3	Adelaide City	26	12	9	5	40	24	+16	33	Qualification for the Finals series
4	Marconi Fairfield	26	14	3	9	48	33	+15	31	Qualification for the Finals series
5	Parramatta Eagles	26	10	9	7	38	31	+7	29	Qualification for the Finals series
6	Sydney Olympic	26	8	13	5	31	25	+6	29	
7	Sydney Croatia	26	8	10	8	27	33	−6	26	
8	Preston Makedonia	26	8	9	9	26	27	−1	25	
9	Wollongong City	26	8	8	10	32	34	−2	24	
10	St George-Budapest (R)	26	6	10	10	34	41	−7	22	Relegation to the NSW Division 1
11	APIA Leichhardt	26	7	7	12	27	28	−1	21	
12	Heidelberg United	26	6	9	11	26	37	−11	21	
13	Sunshine George Cross (R)	26	7	3	16	39	53	−14	17	Relegation to the Victorian Premier League
14	Wollongong Macedonia (R)	26	3	9	14	23	53	−30	15	Relegation to the NSW Division 1

Updated to match(es) played on unknown. Source: rsssf.com
Rules for classification: 1) points; 2) goal difference; 3) number of goals scored.
(C) Champions; (R) Relegated

=== NSL Cup ===
==== Final ====
7 April 1991

Melita Eagles	1–0	Preston Makedonia
Brown 89'	Report

Marconi Stadium, Sydney
Attendance: 6,749
Referee: Tom McRoe
