= 1991 FIFA World Youth Championship =

Campeonato Mundial de Júniores Portugal '91

Tournament details
- Host country: Portugal
- Dates: 14–30 June
- Teams: 16 (from 6 confederations)
- Venues: 5 (in 5 host cities)

Final positions
- Champions: Portugal (2nd title)
- Runners-up: Brazil
- Third place: Soviet Union
- Fourth place: Australia

Tournament statistics
- Matches played: 32
- Goals scored: 82 (2.56 per match)
- Attendance: 731,500 (22,859 per match)
- Top scorer(s): (Soviet Union) Serhiy Scherbakov (5 goals)
- Best player: (Portugal) Emílio Peixe
- Fair play award: Soviet Union

The 1991 FIFA World Youth Championship was the eighth staging of the FIFA World Youth Championship, an international football competition organized by FIFA for men's youth national teams, and the eighth since it was established in 1977 as the FIFA World Youth Tournament. The final tournament took place for the first time in Portugal, between 14 and 30 June 1991. Matches were played across five venues in as many cities: Faro, Braga, Guimarães, Porto and Lisbon. Nigeria originally won the bid to host but was stripped of its right after found guilty for committing age fabrication.

North Korea and South Korea competed for the first time as a united team, although FIFA attributes its historical data to South Korea. Portugal entered the competition as the defending champions, after winning the previous tournament. They reached the final, where a record attendance of 127,000 witnessed the hosts defeat Portuguese-speaking rival Brazil 4–2 on penalties to secure their second consecutive title. The Soviet Union made its last FIFA tournament appearance, as the country was dissolved later that year.

== Qualification ==
In addition to the host team, Portugal, 15 other national teams qualified from six continental tournaments. The North Korean and South Korean teams decided to have a unified team in the tournament.

| Confederation | Qualifying tournament | Qualifier(s) |
|---|---|---|
| AFC (Asia) | 1990 AFC Youth Championship | (Korea) Korea^{1} Syria |
| CAF (Africa) | 1991 African Youth Championship | Ivory Coast; Egypt |
| CONCACAF (North, Central America & Caribbean) | 1990 CONCACAF U-20 Tournament | Mexico; Trinidad and Tobago^{1} |
| CONMEBOL (South America) | 1991 South American Youth Championship | Argentina; Brazil; Uruguay |
| OFC (Oceania) | 1990 OFC U-20 Championship | Australia |
| UEFA (Europe) | Host nation | Portugal |
| UEFA (Europe) | 1990 UEFA European Under-18 Championship | England; Republic of Ireland; Soviet Union; Spain; Sweden^{1} |

1.Teams that made their debut.

== Match officials ==
Africa

- (The Gambia) Alhagi Ibrahima Faye
- (Togo) Mawukpona Hounnake-Kouassi
- (Mauritania) Idrissa Sarr

Asia

- (United Arab Emirates) Ali Bujsaim
- (Japan) Kiichiro Tachi
- (China) Wei Jihong

Europe

- (Belgium) Guy Goethals
- (Germany) Bernd Heynemann
- (Northern Ireland) Leslie Irvine
- (Portugal) João Pinto Correia
- (Norway) Egil Nervik
- (Italy) Pierluigi Pairetto
- (Hungary) Sándor Puhl
- (Switzerland) Daniel Roudit
- (Poland) Ryszard Wojcik

North, Central America and Caribbean

- (United States) Raúl Domínguez
- (Guatemala) Juan Escobar López
- (Canada) Robert Sawtell

South America

- (Uruguay) Ernesto Filippi
- (Argentina) Francisco Lamolina
- (Chile) Enrique Marín Gallo
- (Brazil) Renato Marsiglia
- (Peru) Alberto Tejada

Oceania

- (Australia) John McConnell

== Squads ==
For a list of all squads that played in the final tournament, see 1991 FIFA World Youth Championship squads

== Group stages ==
The 16 teams were split into four groups of four teams. Four group winners, and four second-place finishers qualify for the knockout round.

=== Group A ===
| Pos | Team | Pld | W | D | L | GF | GA | GD | Pts | Group stage result |
|---|---|---|---|---|---|---|---|---|---|---|
| 1 | Portugal (H) | 3 | 3 | 0 | 0 | 6 | 0 | +6 | 6 | Advance to knockout stage |
| 2 | Korea | 3 | 1 | 1 | 1 | 2 | 2 | 0 | 3 | Advance to knockout stage |
| 3 | Republic of Ireland | 3 | 0 | 2 | 1 | 3 | 5 | −2 | 2 | |
| 4 | Argentina | 3 | 0 | 1 | 2 | 2 | 6 | −4 | 1 | |

(H) Hosts
14 June 1991
21:00

| Portugal | 2–0 | Republic of Ireland |
|---|---|---|
| Pinto 17'; Capucho 78' | Report |

Estádio das Antas, Porto
Attendance: 65,000
Referee: Pierluigi Pairetto (Italy)

15 June 1991
19:00

| Argentina | 0–1 | Korea |
|---|---|---|
| | Report | Cho In-chol 88' |

Estádio da Luz, Lisbon
Attendance: 2,000
Referee: Ernesto Filippi (Uruguay)

17 June 1991
19:00

| Republic of Ireland | 1–1 | Korea |
|---|---|---|
| McCarthy 58' | Report | Choi Chol 89' |

Estádio da Luz, Lisbon
Attendance: 5,500
Referee: Robert Sawtell (Canada)

17 June 1991
21:30

| Portugal | 3–0 | Argentina |
|---|---|---|
| Gil 56'; Torres 80'; Toni 86' | Report |

Estádio da Luz, Lisbon
Attendance: 60,000
Referee: Guy Goethals (Belgium)

20 June 1991
19:00

| Republic of Ireland | 2–2 | Argentina |
|---|---|---|
| O'Connor 9'; Byrne 63' | Report | Delgado 55'; Molina 57' (pen.) |

Estádio da Luz, Lisbon
Attendance: 38,000
Referee: Raúl Domínguez (United States)

20 June 1991
21:30

| Portugal | 1–0 | Korea |
|---|---|---|
| Torres 42' | Report |

Estádio da Luz, Lisbon
Attendance: 38,000
Referee: Enrique Marín Gallo (Chile)

=== Group B ===
| Pos | Team | Pld | W | D | L | GF | GA | GD | Pts | Group stage result |
|---|---|---|---|---|---|---|---|---|---|---|
| 1 | Brazil | 3 | 2 | 1 | 0 | 6 | 3 | +3 | 5 | Advance to knockout stage |
| 2 | Mexico | 3 | 1 | 2 | 0 | 6 | 3 | +3 | 4 | Advance to knockout stage |
| 3 | Sweden | 3 | 1 | 0 | 2 | 4 | 6 | −2 | 2 | |
| 4 | Ivory Coast | 3 | 0 | 1 | 2 | 3 | 7 | −4 | 1 | |

15 June 1991
19:00

| Mexico | 3–0 | Sweden |
|---|---|---|
| Hernández 20'; Pineda 51'; Álvarez 64' | Report |

Estádio das Antas, Porto
Attendance: 2,000
Referee: Kiichiro Tachi (Japan)

15 June 1991
21:30

| Brazil | 2–1 | Ivory Coast |
|---|---|---|
| Andrei 29'; Luiz Fernando 79' | Report | Tiéhi 48' |

Estádio das Antas, Porto
Attendance: 8,000
Referee: Ryszard Wojcik (Poland)

17 June 1991
19:00

| Brazil | 2–2 | Mexico |
|---|---|---|
| Paulo Nunes 18'; Luiz Fernando 45' | Report | Pineda 57', 67' |

Estádio das Antas, Porto
Attendance: 3,500
Referee: Leslie Irvine (Northern Ireland)

18 June 1991
19:00

| Ivory Coast | 1–4 | Sweden |
|---|---|---|
| Mambo 64' (pen.) | Report | Rödlund 13'; Bild 23', 46'; Andersson 87' |

Estádio das Antas, Porto
Attendance: 1,500
Referee: João Correia Pinto (Portugal)

20 June 1991
19:00

| Ivory Coast | 1–1 | Mexico |
|---|---|---|
| Seri 79' | Report | Pineda 83' |

Estádio das Antas, Porto
Attendance: 4,000
Referee: Ali Bujsaim (United Arab Emirates)

20 June 1991
21:30

| Brazil | 2–0 | Sweden |
|---|---|---|
| Paulo Nunes 29'; Élber 78' | Report |

Estádio das Antas, Porto
Attendance: 4,000
Referee: Pierluigi Pairetto (Italy)

=== Group C ===
| Pos | Team | Pld | W | D | L | GF | GA | GD | Pts | Group stage result |
|---|---|---|---|---|---|---|---|---|---|---|
| 1 | Australia | 3 | 3 | 0 | 0 | 4 | 0 | +4 | 6 | Advance to knockout stage |
| 2 | Soviet Union | 3 | 2 | 0 | 1 | 5 | 1 | +4 | 4 | Advance to knockout stage |
| 3 | Egypt | 3 | 1 | 0 | 2 | 6 | 2 | +4 | 2 | |
| 4 | Trinidad and Tobago | 3 | 0 | 0 | 3 | 0 | 12 | −12 | 0 | |

15 June 1991
19:30

| Trinidad and Tobago | 0–2 | Australia |
|---|---|---|
| | Report | Okon 52'; Seal 76' |

Estádio Primeiro de Maio, Braga
Attendance: 1,720
Referee: Alberto Tejada Noriega (Peru)

16 June 1991
17:00

| Egypt | 0–1 | Soviet Union |
|---|---|---|
| | Report | Scherbakov 6' |

Estádio Municipal de Guimarães, Guimarães
Attendance: 5,680
Referee: Juan Escobar López (Guatemala)

18 June 1991
19:30

| Trinidad and Tobago | 0–6 | Egypt |
|---|---|---|
| | Report | Hussein 8'; Sadek 24'; Abdel Halil 36'; Sakr 60'; El-Sheshini 79'; Abdel Aziz 82' |

Estádio Primeiro de Maio, Braga
Attendance: 10,000
Referee: Wei Jihong (China)

18 June 1991
21:30

| Australia | 1–0 | Soviet Union |
|---|---|---|
| Maloney 21' | Report |

Estádio Primeiro de Maio, Braga
Attendance: 10,000
Referee: Bernd Heynemann (Germany)

20 June 1991
17:00

| Australia | 1–0 | Egypt |
|---|---|---|
| Trajanovski 43' | Report |

Estádio Municipal de Guimarães, Guimarães
Attendance: 8,800
Referee: Francisco Lamolina (Argentina)

20 June 1991
19:30

| Trinidad and Tobago | 0–4 | Soviet Union |
|---|---|---|
| | Report | Pokhlebayev 9'; Konovalov 15'; Mikhailenko 22'; Scherbakov 35' |

Estádio Municipal de Guimarães, Guimarães
Attendance: 8,800
Referee: Idrissa Sarr (Mauritania)

=== Group D ===
| Pos | Team | Pld | W | D | L | GF | GA | GD | Pts | Group stage result |
|---|---|---|---|---|---|---|---|---|---|---|
| 1 | Spain | 3 | 2 | 1 | 0 | 7 | 0 | +7 | 5 | Advance to knockout stage |
| 2 | Syria | 3 | 1 | 2 | 0 | 4 | 3 | +1 | 4 | Advance to knockout stage |
| 3 | England | 3 | 0 | 2 | 1 | 3 | 4 | −1 | 2 | |
| 4 | Uruguay | 3 | 0 | 1 | 2 | 0 | 7 | −7 | 1 | |

15 June 1991
19:30

| England | 0–1 | Spain |
|---|---|---|
| | Report | Pier 84' |

Estádio de São Luís, Faro
Attendance: 11,500
Referee: Renato Marsiglia (Brazil)

16 June 1991
19:00

| Syria | 1–0 | Uruguay |
|---|---|---|
| Ramadan 57' | Report |

Estádio de São Luís, Faro
Attendance: 5,500
Referee: Alhagi Faye (Gambia)

18 June 1991
19:00

| Spain | 6–0 | Uruguay |
|---|---|---|
| Pier 10' (pen.), 34'; Urzaiz 22', 75', 80' (pen.); Mauricio 36' | Report |

Estádio de São Luís, Faro
Attendance: 11,500
Referee: Daniel Roduit (Switzerland)

18 June 1991
21:30

| England | 3–3 | Syria |
|---|---|---|
| Allen 12'; Awford 69', 84' | Report | Ramadan 18'; Awad 27'; Helou 65' |

Estádio de São Luís, Faro
Attendance: 11,500
Referee: John McConnell (Australia)

20 June 1991
19:00

| Spain | 0–0 | Syria |
|---|---|---|
| | Report |

Estádio de São Luís, Faro
Attendance: 5,000
Referee: Leslie Irvine (Northern Ireland)

20 June 1991
21:30

| England | 0–0 | Uruguay |
|---|---|---|
| | Report |

Estádio de São Luís, Faro
Attendance: 5,000
Referee: Sándor Puhl (Hungary)

== Knockout stage ==
=== Bracket ===
Quarter-finals
June 22 – Lisbon
Portugal (a.e.t.) | 2
Mexico | 1
June 23 – Braga
Australia (p) | 1 (5)
Syria | 1 (4)
June 22 – Porto
Brazil | 5
Korea | 1
June 23 – Faro
Spain | 1
Soviet Union | 3

Semi-finals
June 26 – Lisbon
Portugal | 1
Australia | 0
June 26 – Guimarães
Brazil | 3
Soviet Union | 0

Final
June 30 – Lisbon
Portugal (p) | 0 (4)
Brazil | 0 (2)
Third place
June 29 – Porto
Australia | 1 (4)
Soviet Union (p) | 1 (5)

=== Quarter-finals ===
22 June 1991
18:30

| Portugal | 2–1 (a.e.t.) | Mexico |
|---|---|---|
| Torres 3' (pen.); Toni 101' | Report | Mendoza 35' |

Estádio da Luz, Lisbon
Attendance: 90,000
Referee: Ryszard Wojcik (Poland)

22 June 1991
21:30

| Brazil | 5–1 | Korea |
|---|---|---|
| Marquinhos 15'; Élber 41', 67'; Djair 47', 53' | Report | Choi Chol 40' |

Estádio das Antas, Porto
Attendance: 25,000
Referee: Guy Goethals (Belgium)

23 June 1991
17:00

| Australia | 1–1 (a.e.t.) | Syria |
|---|---|---|
| Seal 20' | Report | A. Mando 56' |
Penalties
| Seal (penalty scored); Okon (penalty scored); Kindtner (penalty missed); Muscat (penalty scored); Babic (penalty scored); Stanton (penalty scored) | 5–4 | (penalty scored) F. Mando; (penalty missed) Khalifa; (penalty scored) Ghaeb; (penalty scored) Abdul Razak; (penalty scored) Ramadan; (penalty missed) Sibai |

Estádio Primeiro de Maio, Braga
Attendance: 10,000
Referee: Renato Marsiglia (Brazil)

23 June 1991
21:30

| Spain | 1–3 | Soviet Union |
|---|---|---|
| Urzáiz 85' | Report | Scherbakov 35', 64'; Mandreko 80' |

Estádio de São Luís, Faro
Attendance: 13,000
Referee: Francisco Lamolina (Argentina)

=== Semi-finals ===
26 June 1991
18:30

| Brazil | 3–0 | Soviet Union |
|---|---|---|
| Marquinhos 15'; Castro 18'; Élber 32' | Report |

Estádio Municipal de Guimarães, Guimarães
Attendance: 22,000
Referee: Raúl Domínguez (United States)

26 June 1991
21:30

| Portugal | 1–0 | Australia |
|---|---|---|
| Rui Costa 31' | Report |

Estádio da Luz, Lisbon
Attendance: 112,000
Referee: Sándor Puhl (Hungary)

=== Third place play-off ===
29 June 1991
21:30

| Australia | 1–1 (a.e.t.) | Soviet Union |
|---|---|---|
| Seal 87' | Report | Scherbakov 39' (pen.) |
Penalties
| Seal (penalty missed); Okon (penalty scored); Corica (penalty scored); Babic (penalty scored); Popovic (penalty scored); Stanton (penalty missed) | 4–5 | (penalty missed) Pokhlebayev; (penalty scored) Bushmanov; (penalty scored) Babalaryan; (penalty scored) Mamchur; (penalty scored) Scherbakov; (penalty scored) Minko |

Estádio das Antas, Porto
Attendance: 6,000
Referee: Idrissa Sarr (Mauritania)

=== Final ===
30 June 1991
19:00

| Portugal | 0–0 (a.e.t.) | Brazil |
|---|---|---|
| | Report |
Penalties
| Jorge Costa (penalty scored); Figo (penalty scored); Paulo Torres (penalty scored); Rui Costa (penalty scored) | 4–2 | (penalty scored) Ramon; (penalty missed) Élber; (penalty scored) Andrei; (penalty missed) Marquinhos |

Estádio da Luz, Lisbon
Attendance: 127,000
Referee: Francisco Lamolina (Argentina)

1991 FIFA World Youth Championship winners

Portugal
Second title

== Awards ==
| Golden Shoe | Golden Ball | Fair Play Award |
|---|---|---|
| (Soviet Union) Serhiy Scherbakov | (Portugal) Emílio Peixe | Soviet Union |

== Goalscorers ==
Serhiy Scherbakov of Soviet Union won the Golden Boot award for scoring five goals. In total, 82 goals were scored by 54 different players, with none of them credited as own goal.

5 goals

- (Soviet Union) Serhiy Scherbakov

4 goals

- (Brazil) Giovane Élber
- (Mexico) Pedro Pineda
- (Spain) Ismael Urzaiz

3 goals

- (Australia) David Seal
- (Portugal) Paulo Torres
- (Spain) Pier

2 goals

- (Brazil) Djair
- (Brazil) Luiz Fernando
- (Brazil) Marquinhos
- (Brazil) Paulo Nunes
- (England) Andy Awford
- (Korea) Choi Chol
- (Portugal) Toni
- (Sweden) Andreas Bild
- (Syria) Munaf Ramadan

1 goal

- (Australia) Brad Maloney
- (Australia) Paul Okon
- (Australia) Kris Trajanovski
- (Argentina) Marcelo Delgado
- (Argentina) Roberto Molina
- (Brazil) Castro
- (Brazil) Andrei Frascarelli
- (Egypt) Amir Abdel Aziz
- (Egypt) Sami El-Sheshini
- (Egypt) Samir Hussein
- (Egypt) Sami Abdel Halil
- (Egypt) Mostafa Sadek
- (Egypt) Tamer Sakr
- (England) Bradley Allen
- (Republic of Ireland) Brian Byrne
- (Republic of Ireland) Paul McCarthy
- (Republic of Ireland) Barry O'Connor
- (Ivory Coast) Ambroise Mambo
- (Ivory Coast) Ambroise Seri
- (Ivory Coast) Sylvain Tiéhi
- (Korea) Cho In-chol
- (Mexico) Damián Álvarez
- (Mexico) Héctor Hernández
- (Mexico) Bruno Mendoza
- (Portugal) Capucho
- (Portugal) Rui Costa
- (Portugal) Gil Gomes
- (Portugal) João Pinto
- (Soviet Union) Serhiy Konovalov
- (Soviet Union) Sergei Mandreko
- (Soviet Union) Dmytro Mykhaylenko
- (Soviet Union) Yevhen Pokhlebayev
- (Spain) José Mauricio Casas
- (Sweden) Patrik Andersson
- (Sweden) Jonny Rödlund
- (Syria) Ammar Awad
- (Syria) Abdul Latif Helou
- (Syria) Abdullah Mando

== Final ranking ==
| Pos | Team | Pld | W | D | L | GF | GA | GD | Pts | Final result |
|---|---|---|---|---|---|---|---|---|---|---|
| 1 | Portugal (H) | 6 | 5 | 1 | 0 | 9 | 1 | +8 | 11 | Champions |
| 2 | Brazil | 6 | 4 | 2 | 0 | 14 | 4 | +10 | 10 | Runners-up |
| 3 | Soviet Union | 6 | 3 | 1 | 2 | 9 | 6 | +3 | 7 | Third place |
| 4 | Australia | 6 | 3 | 2 | 1 | 6 | 3 | +3 | 8 | Fourth place |
| 5 | Spain | 4 | 2 | 1 | 1 | 8 | 3 | +5 | 5 | Eliminated in Quarter-finals |
| 6 | Syria | 4 | 1 | 3 | 0 | 5 | 4 | +1 | 5 | Eliminated in Quarter-finals |
| 7 | Mexico | 4 | 1 | 2 | 1 | 7 | 5 | +2 | 4 | Eliminated in Quarter-finals |
| 8 | Korea | 4 | 1 | 1 | 2 | 3 | 7 | −4 | 3 | Eliminated in Quarter-finals |
| 9 | Egypt | 3 | 1 | 0 | 2 | 6 | 2 | +4 | 2 | Eliminated in Group stage |
| 10 | England | 3 | 0 | 2 | 1 | 3 | 4 | −1 | 2 | Eliminated in Group stage |
| 11 | Sweden | 3 | 1 | 0 | 2 | 4 | 6 | −2 | 2 | Eliminated in Group stage |
| 12 | Republic of Ireland | 3 | 0 | 2 | 1 | 3 | 5 | −2 | 2 | Eliminated in Group stage |
| 13 | Ivory Coast | 3 | 0 | 1 | 2 | 3 | 7 | −4 | 1 | Eliminated in Group stage |
| 14 | Argentina | 3 | 0 | 1 | 2 | 2 | 6 | −4 | 1 | Eliminated in Group stage |
| 15 | Uruguay | 3 | 0 | 1 | 2 | 0 | 7 | −7 | 1 | Eliminated in Group stage |
| 16 | Trinidad and Tobago | 3 | 0 | 0 | 3 | 0 | 12 | −12 | 0 | Eliminated in Group stage |

Source: rsssf.com
(H) Hosts
