= 1992–93 Real Madrid CF season =

91st season in existence of Real Madrid CF

Real Madrid C.F.
1992–93 season
- President: Ramón Mendoza
- Head coach: Benito Floro
- Stadium: Santiago Bernabéu
- La Liga: 2nd
- Copa del Rey: Winners (In UEFA Cup Winners' Cup)
- UEFA Cup: Quarter-finals
- Top goalscorer: League: Iván Zamorano (26); All: Iván Zamorano (37)
Home colours	Away colours

The 1992–93 season was the 62nd season for Real Madrid C.F. in La Liga.

== Summary ==
Real Madrid once again failed to win the La Liga despite taking the lead in late May thanks to Barcelona's several slips in the league. However, they once again collapsed in the season finale against Tenerife for the second season in a row.

After failing to win the league, Real Madrid once again settled for Copa del Rey as a consolation prize by defeating Real Zaragoza 2–0 against in late June. On the other hand, Real Madrid also went out of the UEFA Cup against Paris-Saint Germain in the quarter-finals.

== Squad ==
Note: Flags indicate national team as defined under FIFA eligibility rules; some limited exceptions apply. Players may hold more than one non-FIFA nationality.

No.	Pos.	Nation	Player
—	GK	ESP	Paco Buyo
—	GK	ESP	Pedro Luis Jaro
—	GK	ESP	Juanmi
—	DF	ESP	Chendo
—	DF	ESP	Francisco Villarroya
—	DF	ESP	Luis Miguel Ramis
—	DF	BRA	Ricardo Rocha
—	DF	ESP	Mikel Lasa
—	DF	ESP	Nando
—	DF	ESP	Manolo Sanchís
—	MF	ESP	Fernando Hierro
—	MF	ESP	Míchel

No.	Pos.	Nation	Player
—	MF	CRO	Robert Prosinečki
—	MF	ESP	Luis Enrique Martínez
—	MF	ESP	Rafael Martín Vázquez
—	MF	ESP	Luis Milla
—	MF	ESP	Paco Llorente
—	MF	ESP	Alberto Toril
—	MF	ESP	Santiago Aragón
—	MF	ESP	Juan José Maqueda
—	FW	ESP	Emilio Butragueño
—	FW	CHI	Iván Zamorano
—	FW	ESP	Alfonso Pérez
—	FW	ARG	Juan Eduardo Esnáider
—	FW	ESP	Ismael Urzaiz

=== Transfers ===
In
Pos.	Name	from	Type
FW	Ivan Zamorano	Sevilla FC	
DF	Nando	FC Barcelona	
MF	Santiago Aragon	Real Valladolid	loan ended
GK	Juanmi	Real Madrid Castilla	
MF	Luiz Fernando Gomes	SC Internacional	

Out
Pos.	Name	To	Type
FW	Hugo Sánchez	CF America	
MF	Gheorghe Hagi	Brescia Calcio	
MF	Rafael Gordillo	Real Betis	
DF	Miguel Tendillo	Real Burgos	
MF	Aldana	Deportivo La Coruña	
MF	Luiz Fernando Gomes	S.C. Braga	loan

==== Winter ====
In
Pos.	Name	from	Type
MF	Martín Vázquez	Olympique Marseille	

Out
Pos.	Name	To	Type
FW	Santiago Aragon	Real Zaragoza	

== Competitions ==
=== La Liga ===
==== League table ====
Pos	Team	Pld	W	D	L	GF	GA	GD	Pts	Qualification or relegation
1	Barcelona (C)	38	25	8	5	87	34	+53	58	Qualification for the Champions League first round
2	Real Madrid	38	24	9	5	75	28	+47	57	Qualification for the Cup Winners' Cup first round (Note: Real Madrid entered European Cup Winners' Cup as winners of 1992–93 Copa del Rey.)
3	Deportivo La Coruña	38	22	10	6	67	33	+34	54	Qualification for the UEFA Cup first round
4	Valencia	38	19	10	9	60	33	+27	48	Qualification for the UEFA Cup first round
5	Tenerife	38	15	14	9	59	47	+12	44	Qualification for the UEFA Cup first round

Source: LFP
Rules for classification: 1) points; 2) head-to-head points; 3) head-to-head goal difference; 4) head-to-head goals scored; 5) goal difference; 6) number of goals scored.
(C) Champions

==== Results by round ====
Round	1	2	3	4	5	6	7	8	9	10	11	12	13	14	15	16	17	18	19	20	21	22	23	24	25	26	27	28	29	30	31	32	33	34	35	36	37	38
Ground	A	H	A	H	A	H	A	H	A	H	A	H	A	H	A	H	A	A	H	H	A	H	A	H	A	H	A	H	A	H	A	H	A	H	A	H	H	A
Result	L	W	D	W	L	W	W	W	W	W	D	W	L	W	L	W	W	D	W	W	W	D	W	W	W	D	D	W	W	W	W	D	D	W	D	W	W	L
Position	16	8	10	5	9	5	4	2	2	2	2	2	4	3	3	3	3	3	3	3	3	3	3	2	2	2	2	2	2	2	2	2	2	2	1	1	1	2

Source: Competitive matches
A = Away; H = Home; W = Win; D = Draw; L = Loss; = Leader, 1993–94 UEFA Champions League; = 1993–94 UEFA Cup

==== Matches ====
4 September 1992 1	FC Barcelona	2-1	Real Madrid	Barcelona
	Bakero 4'; Stoichkov 87'	Report	Míchel 71' (pen.)	Stadium: Camp Nou

12 September 1992 2	Real Madrid	3-0	Real Burgos	Madrid
	Hierro 11'; Zamorano 70' 85'	Report		Stadium: Estadio Santiago Bernabéu

19 September 1992 3	Sporting Gijón	0-0	Real Madrid	Gijón
		Report		Stadium: Estadio El Molinón

25 September 1992 4	Real Madrid	3-0	Albacete Balompié	Madrid
	Hierro 11'; Zamorano 70' 85'	Report		Stadium: Estadio Santiago Bernabéu

3 October 1992 5	Deportivo La Coruña	3-2	Real Madrid	A Coruña
	Bebeto 35' 65'; Rocha (80og.)	Report	Hierro 21'; Zamorano 25'	Stadium: Estadio Riazor

8 October 1992 6	Real Madrid	2-0	Valencia CF	Madrid
	Hierro 71'; Prosinečki 89'	Report		Stadium: Estadio Santiago Bernabéu

18 October 1992 7	CD Logroñés	0-3	Real Madrid	Logroño
		Report	Vázquez 15'; Enrique 50'; Alfonso 83'	Stadium: Las Gaunas

24 October 1992 8	Real Madrid	2-0	Athletic Bilbao	Madrid
	Zamorano 3'; Butragueño 53'	Report		Stadium: Estadio Santiago Bernabéu

30 October 1992 9	Real Zaragoza	0-1	Real Madrid	Zaragoza
		Report	Zamorano 3'	Stadium: Estadio La Romareda

7 November 1992 10	Real Madrid	3-1	RCD Español	Madrid
	Zamorano 46' 57'; Alfonso 89'	Report	Korneev 32' (pen.)	Stadium: Estadio Santiago Bernabéu

20 November 1992 11	Cádiz CF	1-1	Real Madrid	Cádiz
	Oliva 48'	Report	Milla 65'	Stadium: Ramón de Carranza

28 November 1992 12	Real Madrid	3-2	Real Oviedo	Madrid
	Hierro 30'; Martín Vázquez 48'; Milla 79'	Report	Berto 21'; Carlos 66'	Stadium: Estadio Santiago Bernabéu

5 December 1992 13	Rayo Vallecano	2-0	Real Madrid	Madrid
	Riesco 6'; Polster 23'	Report		Stadium: Vallecas

12 December 1992 14	Real Madrid	1-0	Celta Vigo	Madrid
	Zamorano 83'	Report		Stadium: Estadio Santiago Bernabéu

18 December 1992 15	Sevilla CF	2-0	Real Madrid	Seville
	Šuker 32'; Marcos 89'	Report		Stadium: Estadio Sánchez Pizjuán

2 January 1993 16	Real Madrid	3-0	CA Osasuna	Madrid
	Hierro 55' 83'; Butragueño 87'	Report		Stadium: Estadio Santiago Bernabéu

9 January 1993 17	Real Sociedad	1-5	Real Madrid	San Sebastián
	Imaz 25'	Report	Butragueño 9'; Hierro 26'; Zamorano 46' 63'; Luis Enrique 83'	Stadium: Atotxa

15 January 1993 18	Atlético Madrid	1-1	Real Madrid	Madrid
	Sabas 14'	Report	Zamorano 27'	Stadium: Estadio Vicente Calderón

23 January 1993 19	Real Madrid	3-0	CD Tenerife	Madrid
	Zamorano 27' 89'; Gómez (75og.)	Report		Stadium: Estadio Santiago Bernabéu

29 January 1993 20	Real Madrid	2-1	FC Barcelona	Madrid
	Zamorano 9'; Míchel 41' (pen.)	Report	Amor 15'	Stadium: Estadio Santiago Bernabéu

6 February 1993 21	Real Burgos	1-2	Real Madrid	Burgos
	Emilio 80'	Report	Martín Vázquez 6' 66'	Stadium: El Plantío

13 February 1993 22	Real Madrid	0-0	Sporting Gijón	Madrid
		Report		Stadium: Estadio Santiago Bernabéu

20 February 1993 23	Albacete Balompié	0-3	Real Madrid	Albacete
		Report	Prosinečki 57'; Fernando Hierro 58'; Michel 62' (pen.)	Stadium: Estadio Carlos Belmonte

26 February 1993 24	Real Madrid	2-1	Deportivo La Coruña	Madrid
	Zamorano 55'; Michel 84'	Report	Barragán 33'	Stadium: Estadio Santiago Bernabéu

6 March 1993 25	Valencia CF	1-2	Real Madrid	Valencia
	Penev 5'	Report	Míchel 47'; Zamorano 89'	Stadium: Estadio Mestalla

13 March 1993 26	Real Madrid	2-2	CD Logroñés	Madrid
	Butragueño 77'; Esnáider 88'	Report	Abadia 61' (pen.) 89'	Stadium: Estadio Santiago Bernabéu

20 March 1993 27	Athletic Bilbao	1-1	Real Madrid	Bilbao
	Urrutia 73'	Report	Butragueño 44'	Stadium: San Mamés

3 April 1993 28	Real Madrid	4-0	Real Zaragoza	Madrid
	Sanchís 19'; Zamorano 34' 87'; Hierro 37'	Report		Stadium: Estadio Santiago Bernabéu

10 April 1993 29	RCD Español	1-3	Real Madrid	Barcelona
	Escaich 30'	Report	Hierro 7'; Prosinečki 50'; Zamorano 65'	Stadium: Sarrià

17 April 1993 30	Real Madrid	3-1	Cádiz CF	Madrid
	Butragueño 53' 74'; Zamorano 64'	Report	Macedo 33'	Stadium: Estadio Santiago Bernabéu

30 April 1993 31	Real Oviedo	0-4	Real Madrid	Oviedo
		Report	Butragueño 2'; Hierro 36'; Zamorano 63' 89'	Stadium: Carlos Tartiere

8 May 1993 32	Real Madrid	1-1	Rayo Vallecano	Madrid
	Zamorano 71'	Report	Riesco 46'	Stadium: Estadio Santiago Bernabéu

14 May 1993 33	Celta Vigo	1-1	Real Madrid	Vigo
	Gudelj 47'	Report	Míchel 12' (pen.)	Stadium: Estadio Balaídos

22 May 1993 34	Real Madrid	5-0	Sevilla FC	Madrid
	Zamorano 15' 38' 40'; Míchel 32'; Hierro 73'	Report		Stadium: Estadio Santiago Bernabéu

29 May 1993 35	CA Osasuna	0-0	Real Madrid	Pamplona
		Report		Stadium: Estadio El Sadar

4 June 1993 36	Real Madrid	2-0	Real Sociedad	Madrid
	Milla 54'; Míchel 89'	Report		Stadium: Estadio Santiago Bernabéu

11 June 1993 37	Real Madrid	1-0	Atlético Madrid	Madrid
	Hierro 51'	Report		Stadium: Estadio Santiago Bernabéu

19 June 1993 38	CD Tenerife	2-0	Real Madrid	Santa Cruz de Tenerife
	Oscar Dertycia 11' (yellow card); Chano 42'; Llorente (yellow card); César Gómez (yellow card) (yellow-red card); Toño (yellow card)		Sanchís (yellow card); Zamorano (red card) 79'	Stadium: Estadio Heliodoro Rodriguez; Referee: Celino Gracia Redondo

=== Copa del Rey ===
==== Round of 16 ====
2 February 1993	RCD Mallorca	2-0	Real Madrid	Palma
	Pepe 13'; Delgado 70'			Stadium: Lluís Sitjar

17 February 1993	Real Madrid	3-0	RCD Mallorca	Madrid
	Zamorano 35' 38'; Alfonso 63'			Stadium: Estadio Santiago Bernabéu

==== Quarter-finals ====
23 March 1993	Real Madrid	4-0	Real Sociedad	Madrid
	Oceano 10' (o.g.); Zamorano 13' 48'; Prosinečki 55'			Stadium: Estadio Santiago Bernabéu

12 April 1993	Real Sociedad	4-1	Real Madrid	San Sebastián
	Alkiza 13' 43' 68'; Álaba 74'		Esnáider 30'	Stadium: Atotxa

==== Semi-finals ====
8 June 1993	Real Madrid	1-1	FC Barcelona	Madrid
	Zamorano 40'	Report	Bakero 30'	Stadium: Estadio Santiago Bernabéu

15 June 1993	FC Barcelona	1-2	Real Madrid	Barcelona
	Laudrup 87'	Report	Míchel 24' (pen.); Zamorano 82'	Stadium: Estadio Nou Camp

==== Final ====
26 June 1993	Real Madrid	2-0	Real Zaragoza	Valencia
20:00 CET	Butragueño 29'; Lasa 78'	Report		Stadium: Estadio Luis Casanova; Attendance: 42,000; Referee: Joaquin Urio Velazquez

=== UEFA Cup ===
==== First round ====
15 September 1992	Politehnica Timișoara (Romania)	1-1	(Spain) Real Madrid	Timișoara
	Cuc 61'	Report	Alfonso 15'	Stadium: Politehnica

29 September 1992	Real Madrid (Spain)	4-0	(Romania) Politehnica Timișoara	Madrid
	Alfonso 28'; Enrique 57'; Esnaider 63'; Michel 87'	Report		Stadium: Estadio Santiago Bernabéu

==== Second round ====
21 October 1992	Real Madrid (Spain)	5-2	(Russia) Torpedo Moscow	Madrid
	Hierro 8' 28' 32'; Zamorano 52'; Michel 85' (pen.)	Report	Shustikov 36'; Grishin 39'	Stadium: Estadio Santiago Bernabéu

3 November 1992	Torpedo Moscow (Russia)	3-2	(Spain) Real Madrid	Moscow
	Talalayev 11'; Tishkov 61'; Murashov 77'	Report	Zamorano 9'; Hierro 56'	Stadium: Eduard Streltsov

==== Third round ====
25 November 1992	Vitesse Arnhem (Netherlands)	0-1	(Spain) Real Madrid	Arnhem
		Report	Hierro 73'	Stadium: Nieuw Monnikenhuize

9 December 1992	Real Madrid (Spain)	1-0	(Netherlands) Vitesse Arnhem	Madrid
	Zamorano 31'	Report		Stadium: Estadio Santiago Bernabéu

==== Quarter-finals ====
1 March 1993	Real Madrid (Spain)	3-1	(France) Paris Saint-Germain	Madrid
	Butragueno 31'; Zamorano 34'; Michel 90'	Report	Ginola 49'	Stadium: Estadio Santiago Bernabéu

17 March 1993	Paris Saint-Germain (France)	4-1	(Spain) Real Madrid	Paris
	Weah 33'; Ginola 81'; Valdo 87'; Kombouare 90'	Report	Zamorano 90'	Stadium: Parc des Princes

== Statistics ==
=== Squad statistics ===
No.	Pos	Nat	Player	Total		La Liga		Copa del Rey		UEFA Cup	
No.	Pos	Nat	Player	Apps	Goals	Apps	Goals	Apps	Goals	Apps	Goals
	GK	(Spain) ESP	Buyo	33	-28	26	-19	3	-2	4	-7
	DF	(Spain) ESP	Nando	45	0	32	0	5+1	0	7	0
	DF	(Brazil) BRA	Ricardo Rocha	40	0	31	0	5	0	4	0
	DF	(Spain) ESP	Sanchis	49	1	37	1	6	0	6	0
	DF	(Spain) ESP	Mikel Lasa	44	1	34	0	3+1	1	6	0
	MF	(Croatia) CRO	Robert Prosinečki	37	4	28+1	3	3	1	5	0
	MF	(Spain) ESP	Fernando Hierro	45	18	33	13	6	0	6	5
	MF	(Spain) ESP	Míchel	51	13	37	9	6	1	8	3
	MF	(Spain) ESP	Luis Enrique	48	3	20+14	2	6	0	7+1	1
	FW	(Spain) ESP	Butragueño	43	11	34	9	3	1	6	1
	FW	(Chile) CHI	Iván Zamorano	45	37	34	26	4	6	7	5
	GK	(Spain) ESP	Pedro Jaro	20	-19	12	-9	4	-6	4	-4
	MF	(Spain) ESP	Martin Vázquez	23	4	17+2	4	3+1	0	0	0
	MF	(Spain) ESP	Luis Milla	34	3	13+8	3	6	0	5+2	0
	FW	(Spain) ESP	Alfonso Pérez	39	6	4+23	3	4+1	1	3+4	2
	DF	(Spain) ESP	Chendo	18	0	12	0	4	0	1+1	0
	DF	(Spain) ESP	Francisco Villarroya	17	0	6+3	0	2+2	0	2+2	0
	DF	(Spain) ESP	Ramis	14	0	6+1	0	2+1	0	4	0
	MF	(Spain) ESP	Paco Llorente	13	0	1+7	0	1+2	0	0+2	0
	FW	(Argentina) ARG	Juan Esnaider	15	3	1+7	1	1+3	1	0+3	1
	MF	(Spain) ESP	Toril	4	0	0+2	0	0	0	2	0
	DF	(Spain) ESP	Tendillo	1	0	0	0	0	0	1	0
	MF	(Spain) ESP	Aragon	1	0	0	0	0	0	0+1	0
	FW	(Spain) ESP	Urzaiz	1	0	0	0	0+1	0	-	-
	DF	(Spain) ESP	Velasco	1	0	0	0	0+1	0	-	-
	MF	(Spain) ESP	Maqueda	0	0	0	0	-	-	-	-
	DF	(Spain) ESP	Juanmi	0	0	0	0	-	-	-	-

- Source: https://www.bdfutbol.com/en/t/t1992-932.html
