= Soviet Union national under-20 football team =

National U-20 association football team

Soviet Union U-20
- Nickname: Lads (Юноши)
- Association: Football Federation of the Soviet Union
- Confederation: UEFA (Europe)
- Head coach: -
- FIFA code: URS
First colours	Second colours

First international
- Soviet Union 3–1 Iraq (Sfax, Tunisia; 28 June 1977); Last international Australia 1–1 (4–5 p) Soviet Union (Porto, Portugal; 29 June 1991)

Biggest win
- Soviet Union 5–0 Canada (Minsk, Soviet Union; 29 August 1985)

Biggest defeat
- Brazil 3–0 Soviet Union (Guimarães, Portugal; 26 June 1991)

FIFA U-20 World Cup
- Appearances: 6 (first in 1977)
- Best result: Winners, 1977

The Soviet national youth football team was a special under-18 and under-20 football team of the Soviet Union designated specifically for FIFA World Youth Championship (today FIFA U-20 World Cup). It ceased to exist on the breakup of the Union.

The team was created in 1977 for the newly created FIFA competition for junior teams (among lads, under-18).

With dissolution of the Soviet Union, the Soviet Union youth football team competed at the 1992 UEFA European Under-18 Championship as the CIS youth under-18 football team which qualified for the 1993 FIFA World Youth Championship. That berth was passed over (grandfathered) to the Russia national under-20 football team.

== FIFA World Youth Championship ==
Champions Runners-up Third place Fourth place

FIFA World Youth Championship record
Year	Round	Position	GP	W	D*	L	GS	GA
(Tunisia) 1977	Champions	1st	5	2	3	0	7	4
(Japan) 1979	Runners-up	2nd	6	3	1	2	12	7
(Australia) 1981	Did not qualify							
(Mexico) 1983	Group stage	15th	3	0	0	3	3	6
(Soviet Union) 1985	Fourth place	4th	6	3	3	0	10	3
(Chile) 1987	Did not qualify							
(Saudi Arabia) 1989	Quarter-finals	5th	4	3	1	0	11	6
(Portugal) 1991	Third place	3rd	6	3	1	2	9	6
Total	1 title	6/8	30	14	9	7	52	32

*Denotes draws include knockout matches decided on penalty kicks.

== Head-to-head record ==
The following table shows Soviet Union's head-to-head record in the FIFA U-20 World Cup.

Opponent	Pld	W	D	L	GF	GA	GD	Win %
Argentina	1	0	0	1	1	3	−2	0.00
Australia	3	0	2	1	1	2	−1	0.00
Austria	1	0	1	0	0	0	+0	0.00
Brazil	2	0	0	2	1	5	−4	0.00
Canada	1	1	0	0	5	0	+5	100.00
China	1	1	0	0	1	0	+1	100.00
Colombia	1	1	0	0	3	1	+2	100.00
Costa Rica	1	1	0	0	1	0	+1	100.00
Egypt	1	1	0	0	1	0	+1	100.00
Guinea	1	1	0	0	3	0	+3	100.00
Hungary	1	1	0	0	5	1	+4	100.00
Iraq	1	1	0	0	3	1	+2	100.00
Mexico	1	0	1	0	2	2	+0	0.00
Netherlands	1	0	0	1	2	3	−1	0.00
Paraguay	2	1	1	0	4	3	+1	50.00
Poland	1	1	0	0	1	0	+1	100.00
Nigeria	4	1	2	1	6	6	+0	25.00
Spain	2	1	1	0	5	3	+2	50.00
Syria	1	1	0	0	3	1	+2	100.00
Trinidad and Tobago	1	1	0	0	4	0	+4	100.00
Uruguay	2	0	1	1	0	1	−1	0.00
Total	30	14	9	7	52	32	+20	46.67

== Head coaches ==
- 1977 Sergei Mosyagin
- 1979 Sergei Korshunov
- 1983 Nikolay Kiselyov
- 1985 Sergei Mosyagin
- 1989 Boris Ignatyev
- 1991 Gennadi Kostylev

== 1991 FIFA World Youth Championship ==
The last Soviet U-20 team

Head coach
Gennadi Kostylev

No.	Pos.	Player	Date of birth (age)	Caps	Club
1	GK	Oleksandr Pomazun	11 October 1971 (aged 20)		(Soviet Union) Metallist Kharkov
2	DF	Yervand Krbachian	1 October 1971 (aged 20)		(Soviet Union) Ararat Yerevan
3	DF	Sergei Mandreko	1 August 1971 (aged 20)		(Soviet Union) Pamir Dushanbe
4	DF	Sergei Mamchur	3 February 1972 (aged 19)		(Soviet Union) Dnipro Dnipropetrovsk
5	DF	Valeri Minko	8 August 1971 (aged 20)		(Soviet Union) CSKA Moscow
6	DF	Evgeni Bushmanov	2 November 1971 (aged 20)		(Soviet Union) Spartak Moscow
7	MF	Dmitri Mikhailenko	13 July 1973 (aged 18)		(Soviet Union) Dnipro Dnipropetrovsk
8	FW	Serhiy Scherbakov	15 August 1971 (aged 20)		(Soviet Union) Shakhtar Donetsk
9	FW	Dmitri Karsakov	29 December 1971 (aged 20)		(Soviet Union) CSKA Moscow / KAMAZ N. Chelny
10	FW	Serhiy Konovalov	1 March 1972 (aged 19)		(Soviet Union) Dnipro Dnipropetrovsk
11	MF	Volodymyr Sharan	18 September 1971 (aged 20)		(Soviet Union) Karpaty Lviv / Dynamo Kyiv
12	GK	Andrei Novosadov	27 March 1972 (aged 19)		(Soviet Union) CSKA Moscow
13	DF	Dmitri Klimovich	30 April 1972 (aged 19)		(Soviet Union) Dinamo Minsk
14	DF	Alexei Guschin	21 October 1971 (aged 20)		(Soviet Union) CSKA Moscow
15	MF	Yuri Alekseevich Drozdov	16 January 1972 (aged 19)		(Soviet Union) Dynamo Moscow
16	MF	Vitali But	16 November 1972 (aged 19)		(Soviet Union) Dynamo Moscow
17	MF	Armen Babalarian	15 August 1971 (aged 20)		(Soviet Union) Ararat Yerevan / Kotayk
18	MF	Evgueni Pokhlebaev	25 November 1971 (aged 20)		(Soviet Union) Dnipro Dnipropetrovsk
19	GK	Gennady Tumilovich	3 September 1971 (aged 20)		(Soviet Union) Dinamo Minsk

Notes:

- All data through December 31, 1991.
- 1992 transfers: Mandreko moved to Austria (Rapid Wien), Mamchur - Russia (Asmaral Moscow), Bushmanov changed team (CSKA Moscow), Scherbakov - Portugal (Sporting CP), Novosadov changed team (KAMAZ Naberezhnye Chelny), Tumilovich changed team (Belarus Minsk).

== See also ==
- Soviet Union national football team
- Soviet Union national under-18 football team
- Soviet Union national under-16 football team
- FIFA U-20 World Cup
- UEFA European Under-19 Championship
