= 1994–95 Real Madrid CF season =

93rd season in existence of Real Madrid CF

Real Madrid CF
1994–95 season
- President: Ramón Mendoza
- Head coach: Jorge Valdano
- Stadium: Santiago Bernabéu
- La Liga: 1st
- Copa del Rey: Round of 16
- UEFA Cup: Round of 16
- Top goalscorer: League: Ivan Zamorano (28 goals); All: Ivan Zamorano (31 goals)
Home colours	Away colours

The 1994–95 season was the 64th season for Real Madrid in La Liga.

== Summary ==
During the summer, the club was reinforced in the midfield with Danish playmaker Michael Laudrup (in a controversial transfer from Barcelona) and Argentine Fernando Redondo; right back defender Sánchez Flores arrived from Valencia, and changes came to the dugout too, with Argentine head coach Jorge Valdano arriving from CD Tenerife after seven years of his forced retirement as a player during the climax of "La Quinta del Buitre" era.

The team played a 4–4–2 system with Buyo remaining as goalkeeper, Quique Sánchez Flores replacing aging Chendo as right back, while the central defenders were Fernando Hierro and Manolo Sanchís who replaced an injured Alkorta, along with the left back Mikel Lasa. Valdano changed the midfield towards aggressive play with Redondo and Laudrup in the center, Amavisca played superb as left winger and Luis Enrique took the right wing, a new role for him that turned out to be crucial for the squad. In the attacking line, Zamorano recovered his high level of play after a disastrous campaign last season, winning the Pichichi Trophy as the league top scorer. The season also saw the breakthrough of a 17-year-old forward Raúl who would assume the starting position in place of rapidly declining Alfonso and Emilio Butragueño.

In the meantime, financial worries increased during the season and on 16 February 1995, incumbent Ramon Mendoza defeated challenger Florentino Pérez in the club's longest ever Presidential election by just 698 votes. Mendoza's re-election was possible due to the good pace of the team in the league. Madrid ultimately clinched its first 26th league title and first in five years. In the cup competitions, however, the team was less fortunate, going out at the round of 16 stage both in the Copa del Rey and UEFA Cup to Valencia and Odense, respectively. The latter exit was particularly marred due to an embarrassing 0–2 home loss after a 3–2 first leg away victory.

== Squad ==
Note: Flags indicate national team as defined under FIFA eligibility rules; some limited exceptions apply. Players may hold more than one non-FIFA nationality.

No.	Pos.	Nation	Player
-	GK	ESP	Francisco Buyo
-	GK	ESP	Santiago Cañizares
-	DF	ESP	Quique Sánchez Flores
-	DF	ESP	Chendo
-	DF	ESP	Manolo Sanchís
-	DF	ESP	Rafael Alkorta
-	DF	ESP	Mikel Lasa
-	DF	ESP	Fernando Muñoz
-	MF	ESP	Míchel
-	MF	ESP	Fernando Hierro
-	MF	ESP	Luis Milla

No.	Pos.	Nation	Player
-	MF	ESP	Martín Vázquez
-	MF	DEN	Michael Laudrup
-	MF	ARG	Fernando Redondo
-	MF	ESP	José Amavisca
-	FW	CHI	Iván Zamorano
-	FW	ESP	Luis Enrique
-	FW	ESP	Emilio Butragueño
-	FW	ESP	Alfonso Pérez
-	FW	ESP	Raul
-	FW	ESP	Dani
-	FW	SVK	Peter Dubovský

=== Transfers ===
In
Pos.	Name	from	Type
FW	Michael Laudrup	FC Barcelona	
MF	Fernando Redondo	CD Tenerife	€4,500,000
MF	José Amavisca	Real Valladolid	€1,050,000
GK	Santiago Cañizares	Celta Vigo	
DF	Quique Flores	Valencia CF	
FW	Raul	Castilla	
GK	Pedro Contreras	Castilla	
MF	Luiz Fernando Gomes	Castilla	loan ended

Out
Pos.	Name	To	Type
FW	Juan Esnaider	Real Zaragoza	
DF	Francisco Villarroya	Deportivo	
GK	Pedro Luis Jaro	Real Betis	
MF	Paco Llorente	SD Compostela	
GK	Carlos Cano	Celta Vigo	
MF	Alberto Toril	Celta Vigo	
DF	Jesús Velasco	Sporting Gijón	
MF	Luiz Fernando Gomes	SC Internacional	free

==== Winter ====
In
Pos.	Name	from	Type

Out
Pos.	Name	To	Type
FW	Robert Prosinečki	Real Oviedo	loan

== Competitions ==
=== La Liga ===
==== Position by round ====
Round	1	2	3	4	5	6	7	8	9	10	11	12	13	14	15	16	17	18	19	20	21	22	23	24	25	26	27	28	29	30	31	32	33	34	35	36	37	38
Ground	A	H	H	A	H	A	H	A	H	A	H	A	H	A	H	A	H	A	H	H	A	A	H	A	H	A	H	A	H	A	H	A	H	A	H	A	H	A
Result	W	W	D	W	L	W	W	D	L	W	W	W	D	W	W	W	D	W	D	W	W	D	D	W	L	W	D	W	W	W	W	D	L	W	L	W	W	L
Position	1	2	3	1	3	2	1	2	3	3	2	1	1	1	1	1	1	1	1	1	1	1	1	1	1	1	1	1	1	1	1	1	1	1	1	1	1	1

Source: Competitive matches
A = Away; H = Home; W = Win; D = Draw; L = Loss; = Leader, 1995–96 UEFA Champions League group stage; = 1995–96 UEFA Cup first round; = 1994–95 relegation playoff to 1995–96 Segunda Division; = 1995–96 Segunda Division; R = 1995–96 UEFA Cup Winners' Cup

==== League table ====
Pos	Team	Pld	W	D	L	GF	GA	GD	Pts	Qualification or relegation
1	Real Madrid (C)	38	23	9	6	76	29	+47	55	Qualification for the Champions League group stage
2	Deportivo La Coruña	38	20	11	7	68	32	+36	51	Qualification for the Cup Winners' Cup first round (Note: Deportivo entered UEFA Cup Winners' Cup as winners of 1994–95 Copa del Rey.)
3	Real Betis	38	15	16	7	46	25	+21	46 (Note: BAR 1–1 BET; BET 1–1 BAR)	Qualification for the UEFA Cup first round
4	Barcelona	38	18	10	10	60	45	+15	46	Qualification for the UEFA Cup first round
5	Sevilla (Note: On July 31, 1995, Sevilla and Celta Vigo were relegated to Segunda División B for not providing documentation (an audit) nor making their payments to the Royal Spanish Football Federation within the time limit. The two best qualified teams to be relegated, Albacete and Valladolid were readmitted to La Liga. Later, Sevilla and Celta Vigo claimed that according to the law they had another 15 working days because they made allegations days before. Finally, the solution was to not relegate any involved team and expand the league to 22 teams for the next two seasons.)	38	16	11	11	55	41	+14	43 (Note: SEV: 7 pts; ESP: 3 pts; ZAR: 2 pts)	Qualification for the UEFA Cup first round

Source: LFP
Rules for classification: 1) points; 2) head-to-head points; 3) head-to-head goal difference; 4) head-to-head goals scored; 5) goal difference; 6) number of goals scored.
(C) Champions

==== Matches ====
3 September 1994 1	Sevilla	1–4	Real Madrid	Seville
	Bango 72'		Zamorano 1', 4'; Alfonso 14'; Míchel 47' (pen.)	Stadium: Ramón Sánchez Pizjuán; Referee: Manuel Díaz Vega

10 September 1994 2	Real Madrid	2–0	Logroñés	Madrid
	Zamorano 19', 48'			Stadium: Santiago Bernabéu; Referee: Juan Manuel Brito Arceo

18 September 1994 3	Albacete	1–1	Real Madrid	Albacete
	Óscar 85'		Sanchís 83'	Stadium: Carlos Belmonte; Referee: Arturo Daudén Ibáñez

24 September 1994 4	Real Madrid	4–0	Athletic Bilbao	Madrid
	Zamorano 13', 39'; Hierro 41'; Amavisca 50'			Stadium: Santiago Bernabéu; Referee: Antonio Martin Navarrete

2 October 1994 5	Sporting Gijón	1–0	Real Madrid	Gijón
	Velasco 86'			Stadium: El Molinón; Referee: Juan Ansuategui Roca

9 October 1994 6	Real Madrid	3–1	Racing Santander	Madrid
	Zamorano 1'; Martín Vázquez 56'; Butragueño 63'		Papov 51'	Stadium: Santiago Bernabéu; Referee: José Andradas Asurmendi

15 October 1994 7	Espanyol	1–2	Real Madrid	Barcelona
	Yotov 59'		Amavisca 26', 40'	Stadium: Sarrià; Referee: Francisco Santamaría Uzqueda

23 October 1994 8	Real Madrid	1–1	Compostela	Madrid
	Amavisca 4'		Ohen 55'	Stadium: Santiago Bernabéu; Referee: Luis Contador Crespo

29 October 1994 9	Real Zaragoza	3–2	Real Madrid	Zaragoza
	Juan Esnáider 7', 52'; Gus Poyet 86'		Zamorano 57'; Amavisca 78'	Stadium: La Romareda; Referee: José Rubio Valdivieso

6 November 1994 10	Real Madrid	4–2	Atlético Madrid	Madrid
	Míchel 20' (pen.); Zamorano 25', 43'; Raúl 36'		Kosecki 36'; Simeone 44' (pen.)	Stadium: Santiago Bernabéu; Referee: Antonio López Nieto

19 November 1994 11	Valencia	1–2	Real Madrid	Valencia
	Mijatović 89'		Amavisca 21'; Zamorano 86'	Stadium: Mestalla; Referee: Manuel Díaz Vega

27 November 1994 12	Real Madrid	4–2	Tenerife	Madrid
	Flores 24'; Amavisca 33'; Zamorano 58', 66'		Chano 26' (pen.); Juan Pizzi 74'	Stadium: Santiago Bernabéu; Referee: Francisco Santamaría Uzqueda

3 December 1994 13	Real Sociedad	1–1	Real Madrid	San Sebastián
	Kodro 89'		Hierro 62' (pen.)	Stadium: Anoeta; Referee: Antonio Martin Navarrete

11 December 1994 14	Real Madrid	2–0	Real Oviedo	Madrid
	Raúl 56'; Laudrup 59'			Stadium: Santiago Bernabéu; Referee: Juan Fernández Marín

22 December 1994 15	Real Valladolid	0–5	Real Madrid	Valladolid
			Enrique 4'; Zamorano 12', 31'; Raúl 52'; Alfonso 74'	Stadium: José Zorrilla; Referee: Juan Ansuategui Roca

7 January 1995 16	Real Madrid	5–0	Barcelona	Madrid
	Zamorano 5', 21', 39'; Luis Enrique 68'; Amavisca 70'			Stadium: Santiago Bernabéu; Referee: Francisco Santamaría Uzqueda

14 January 1995 17	Deportivo La Coruña	0–0	Real Madrid	A Coruña
				Stadium: Riazor; Referee: Antonio López Nieto

22 January 1995 18	Real Madrid	4–0	Celta Vigo	Madrid
	Raúl 21', 51'; Hierro 26', 70'			Stadium: Santiago Bernabéu; Referee: Gonzalo Panadero Martínez

29 January 1995 19	Real Betis	0–0	Real Madrid	Seville
				Stadium: Benito Villamarín; Referee: Manuel Díaz Vega

4 February 1995 20	Real Madrid	2–0	Sevilla FC	Madrid
	Raúl 61 ' Lasa 92'; Hierro (yellow card)	Report	Groove (yellow card); Moacir (yellow card); Dumitrescu (yellow card)	Stadium: Estadio Santiago Bernabéu; Referee: Arturo Ibanez

11 February 1995 21	CD Logroñés	1–4	Real Madrid	Logroño
	Silvio (yellow card); Ignacio (yellow card)	Report	Zamorano 31 ' Luis Enrique 41'; Laudrup 59 ' Laudrup 64'; Lasa (yellow card)	Stadium: Las Gaunas; Referee: Juan Arqueo

18 February 1995 22	Real Madrid	0–0	Albacete Balompié	Madrid
	Luis Enrique (yellow card)	Report	Santi Denia (yellow card); Sala (yellow card); López (yellow card); Morientes (yellow card); Salvador (yellow card)	Stadium: Estadio Santiago Bernabéu; Referee: Juan Roca

25 February 1995 23	Athletic Bilbao	1–1	Real Madrid	Bilbao
	Andrinua 43' (yellow card); Estibariz (yellow card); Garitano (yellow card)	Report	Zamorano 75 ' Milla (yellow card); Laudrup (yellow card)	Stadium: San Mamés; Referee: Juan Oliver

4 March 1995 24	Real Madrid	4–0	Sporting Gijón	Madrid
	Hierro 33' (yellow card); Amavisca 36'; Redondo 44 ' Laudrup 61'; Zamorano (yellow card); Vasquez (yellow card)	Report	Pérez (yellow card); Loggi (yellow card)	Stadium: Estadio Santiago Bernabéu; Referee: Gonzalo Martínez

11 March 1995 25	Racing Santander	3–1	Real Madrid	Santander
	Radchenko 52 ' Torre 64' (yellow card); Popov 80'; Adepoju (yellow card); Alfaro (yellow card); Merino (yellow card)	Report	Zamorano 35 '	Stadium: Estadio El Sardinero; Referee: Miguel Lopez

18 March 1995 26	Real Madrid	1–0	RCD Español	Madrid
	Zamorano 44 ' Sanchís (yellow card); Martín Vázquez (yellow card)	Report	López (yellow card); Pochettino (yellow card); Alfaro (yellow card)	Stadium: Estadio Santiago Bernabéu; Referee: Jose Valdivieso

1 April 1995 27	SD Compostela	1–1	Real Madrid	Santiago de Compostela
	Soares 51 ' Villena (yellow card); Christensen (yellow card)	Report	Raúl 40 ' Sanchis (yellow card); Flores (yellow card)	Stadium: San Lázaro; Referee: Celino Redondo

8 April 1995 28	Real Madrid	3–0	Real Zaragoza	Madrid
	Raúl 19 ' Zamorano 77'; Dubovský 79 '	Report	Cáceres (yellow card); Aguado (yellow card); Poyet (yellow card)	Stadium: Estadio Santiago Bernabéu; Referee: Manuel Díaz Vega

14 April 1995 29	Atlético Madrid	0–2	Real Madrid	Madrid
	Solozabal (yellow card); Lopez (yellow card); Dobrovolsky (yellow card); Valencia (yellow card); Kosecki (yellow card)	Report	Zamorano 30 ' Zamorano 71'; Alkorta (yellow card)	Stadium: Estadio Vicente Calderón; Referee: Juan Marin

21 April 1995 30	Real Madrid	3–1	Valencia CF	Madrid
	Zamorano 24 ' Zamorano 72'; Hierro 35 ' (pen.)	Report	Penev 74 ' Cervera (yellow card); Giner (yellow card); Otero (yellow card)	Stadium: Estadio Santiago Bernabéu; Referee: Arturo Ibanez

29 April 1995 31	CD Tenerife	0–1	Real Madrid	Santa Cruz de Tenerife
	Llorente (yellow card); Miñambres (yellow card)	Report	Zamorano 28 '	Stadium: Estadio Heliodoro Rodríguez; Referee: Antonio Nieto

6 May 1995 32	Real Madrid	0–0	Real Sociedad	Madrid
	Chendo (yellow card)	Report	Fuentes (yellow card); Aranzabal (yellow card); De Pedro (yellow card); Alguacil (yellow card); Idiakez (yellow card)	Stadium: Estadio Santiago Bernabéu; Referee: Miguel Lopez

13 May 1995 33	Real Oviedo	3–2	Real Madrid	Oviedo
	Rivas 6', 51'; Carlos 88' (yellow card); Jerkan (yellow card); Jokanović (yellow card); Prosinečki (yellow card); Berto (yellow card); Oli (yellow card)	Report	Hierro 42 ' (pen.) (yellow card); Luis Enrique 60'; Redondo (yellow card)	Stadium: Carlos Tartiere; Referee: Juan Oliver

20 May 1995 34	Real Madrid	1–0	Real Valladolid	Madrid
	Chendo 44 '	Report	Gómez (yellow card) 85' (yellow-red card); Esono (yellow card) 80' (yellow-red card); Quaresma (yellow card)	Stadium: Estadio Santiago Bernabéu; Referee: Alfonso Lopez

26 May 1995 35	FC Barcelona	1–0	Real Madrid	Barcelona
	Nadal 62' (yellow card); Abelardo (yellow card); Koeman (yellow card); Bakero (yellow card); Jordi Cruijff (yellow card)	Report	Lasa (yellow card); Hierro (yellow card); Sánchez Flores (yellow card)	Stadium: Camp Nou; Referee: Juan Marin

2 June 1995 36	Real Madrid	2–1	Deportivo La Coruña	Madrid
	Amavisca 38 ' Zamorano 85' (yellow card); Luis Enrique (yellow card); Redondo (yellow card); Hierro (yellow card); Sánchez Flores (yellow card)	Report	Bebeto 68 ' Rivera (yellow card); Nando (yellow card); Ramon (yellow card)	Stadium: Estadio Santiago Bernabéu; Referee: Antonio Nieto

9 June 1995 37	Celta Vigo	0–2	Real Madrid	Vigo
	Berges (yellow card); Tarraga (yellow card)	Report	Raúl 83 ' Rivera 87'; Sandro (yellow card); Nando (yellow card)	Stadium: Estadio Balaídos; Referee: Celino Redondo

17 June 1995 38	Real Madrid	0–2	Real Betis	Madrid
	Hierro (yellow card); Zamorano (yellow card)	Report	Aquino 19'; Aquino 49'; Vidakovic (yellow card); Merino (yellow card)	Stadium: Estadio Santiago Bernabéu; Referee: Juan Marin

=== Copa del Rey ===
==== Round of 16 ====
9 February 1995	Real Madrid	1–2	Valencia CF	Madrid
		Report		Stadium: Estadio Santiago Bernabéu

16 February 1995	Valencia CF	2–1	Real Madrid	Valencia
				Stadium: Estadio Mestalla

=== UEFA Cup ===
==== First round ====
12 September 1994	Real Madrid (Spain)	1–0	(Portugal) Sporting CP	Madrid
		Report		Stadium: Estadio Santiago Bernabéu

27 September 1994	Sporting CP (Portugal)	2–1 (2–2a agg.)	(Spain) Real Madrid	Lisbon
		Report

==== Second round ====
18 October 1994	Dinamo Moscow (Russia)	2–2	(Spain) Real Madrid	Moscow
		Report

1 November 1994	Real Madrid (Spain)	4–0	(Russia) Dinamo Moscow	Madrid
		Report		Stadium: Estadio Santiago Bernabéu

==== Round of 16 ====
21 November 1994	Odense BK (Denmark)	2–3	(Spain) Real Madrid	Odense
		Report

5 December 1994	Real Madrid (Spain)	0–2	(Denmark) Odense BK	Madrid
		Report		Stadium: Estadio Santiago Bernabéu

== Statistics ==
=== Squad statistics ===
No.	Pos	Nat	Player	Total		La Liga		UEFA Cup		Copa del Rey	
No.	Pos	Nat	Player	Apps	Goals	Apps	Goals	Apps	Goals	Apps	Goals
	GK	(Spain) ESP	Buyo	43	-8	37	0	4	-4	2	-4
	DF	(Spain) ESP	Sanchez Flores	37	1	30	1	5	0	2	0
	DF	(Spain) ESP	Hierro	40	7	33	7	5	0	2	0
	DF	(Spain) ESP	Sanchis	42	1	37	1	3	0	2	0
	DF	(Spain) ESP	Lasa	28	1	25	1	1	0	2	0
	MF	(Spain) ESP	Martín Vázquez	38	3	21+10	2	5	1	0+2	0
	MF	(Argentina) ARG	Redondo	26	2	21+2	1	3	1	0	0
	MF	(Denmark) DEN	Laudrup	40	7	32+1	4	5	2	2	1
	MF	(Spain) ESP	Luis Enrique	43	4	34+1	4	6	0	2	0
	FW	(Chile) CHI	Zamorano	44	31	38	28	5	3	1	0
	FW	(Spain) ESP	Amavisca	45	11	34+3	10	5+1	1	2	0
	GK	(Spain) ESP	Cañizares	3	-4	1	0	2	-4	0	0
	FW	(Spain) ESP	Raúl	30	10	19+9	9	0	0	2	1
	MF	(Spain) ESP	Milla	24	0	17+3	0	2+1	0	1	0
	MF	(Spain) ESP	Míchel	18	2	13	2	3+2	0	0	0
	DF	(Spain) ESP	Chendo	12	1	8+2	1	1+1	0	0	0
	FW	(Spain) ESP	Alfonso	19	2	5+11	2	1	0	0+2	0
	DF	(Spain) ESP	Alkorta	14	0	5+4	0	4	0	1	0
	DF	(Spain) ESP	Alberto	3	0	3	0	0	0	0	0
	MF	(Spain) ESP	Sandro	16	1	2+11	0	1+2	1	0	0
	FW	(Slovakia) SVK	Dubovský	9	1	2+3	1	1+2	0	1	0
	DF	(Spain) ESP	Nando	1	0	1	0	0	0	0	0
	FW	(Spain) ESP	Butragueño	12	1	0+8	1	3+1	0	0	0
	FW	(Spain) ESP	Dani	2	2	0+1	0	0+1	2	0	0
	FW	(Spain) ESP	Rivera	1	0	0+1	0	0	0	0	0
	DF	(Spain) ESP	Nando	1	0	0	0	1	0	0	0
	GK	(Spain) ESP	Contreras	0	0	0	0	0	0	0	0

- Source: https://www.bdfutbol.com/en/t/t1994-952.html
