= Luis Enrique =

Spanish football manager (born 1970)

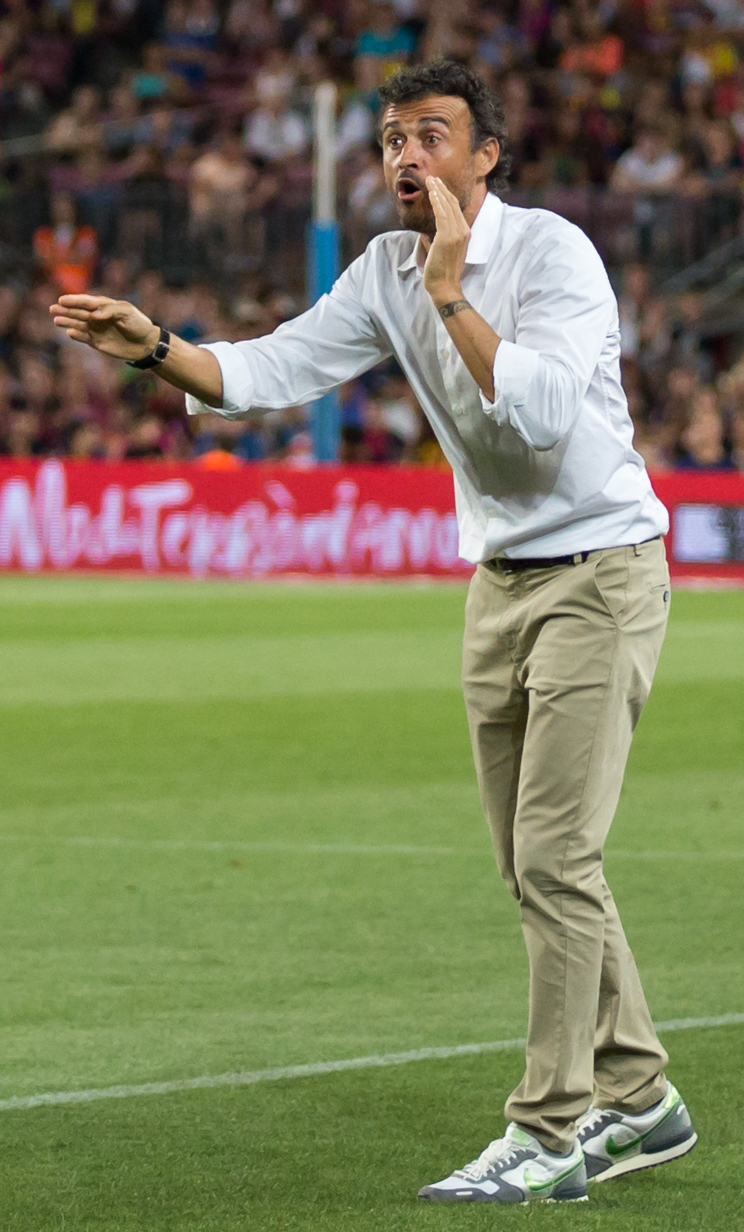
- Luis Enrique in 2014

Personal information
- Full name: Luis Enrique Martínez García
- Date of birth: 8 May 1970 (age 56)
- Place of birth: Gijón, Spain
- Height: 1.80 m (5 ft 11 in)
- Positions: Midfielder; forward

Team information
- Current team: Paris Saint-Germain (head coach)

Youth career
- 1981–1988: Sporting Gijón
- 1984–1988: → La Braña (loan)

Senior career*
Years	Team	Apps	(Gls)
1988–1990	Sporting Gijón B	61	(28)
1989–1991	Sporting Gijón	36	(15)
1991–1996	Real Madrid	157	(15)
1996–2004	Barcelona	207	(73)
Total		461	(131)

International career
1990–1991	Spain U21	5	(0)
1991–1992	Spain U23	14	(3)
1991–2002	Spain	62	(12)
1999–2000	Asturias	2	(0)

Managerial career
- 2008–2011: Barcelona B
- 2011–2012: Roma
- 2013–2014: Celta
- 2014–2017: Barcelona
- 2018–2019: Spain
- 2019–2022: Spain
- 2023–: Paris Saint-Germain
Medal record
Men's football
Representing Spain
Olympic Games
Gold medal – first place	1992 Barcelona	Team
Representing Spain (as manager)
UEFA European Championship
Bronze medal – third place	2020
UEFA Nations League
Runner-up	2021
- * Club domestic league appearances and goals

Luis Enrique Martínez García (Spanish pronunciation: [lwis enˈrike maɾˈtineθ ɡaɾˈθia]; born 8 May 1970) is a Spanish football manager and former player who is the head coach of Ligue 1 club Paris Saint-Germain.

A versatile player with good technique, he was capable of playing in several positions but was usually deployed as a midfielder or forward, and was also noted for his temperament and stamina. Starting in 1988 and ending in 2004, he began his career at Sporting de Gijón and later represented both Real Madrid and Barcelona with both individual and team success, taking part in 558 official games and scoring 144 goals. He appeared with the Spain national team in three World Cups and Euro 1996.

Luis Enrique started working as a manager in 2008 with Barcelona B, before moving to Roma three years later. In the 2013–14 season, he managed Celta, before returning to Barcelona and winning the treble in his first year and the double in the second. In 2018, he was appointed Spain head coach for the first time before resigning for family reasons in 2019, but reassumed the position the same year and subsequently led the team to the semi-finals of Euro 2020 and to second place in the 2020–21 Nations League, resigning at the end of the 2022 World Cup. In July 2023, he joined French club Paris Saint-Germain, claiming three trophies in his first season and four in his second, including the first UEFA Champions League in their history, a title he retained the following campaign.

== Club career ==
Luis Enrique was born in Gijón, Asturias, and began his career with local Sporting de Gijón, where he gained the nickname Lucho after Luis Flores, a Mexican forward in the team. He then spent most of his playing days with the two biggest Spanish clubs: first Real Madrid for five seasons and, in 1996, after seeing out his contract and notably scoring in a 5–0 home win against Barcelona in January 1995, stating later he "rarely felt appreciated by the Real Madrid supporters and didn't have good memories there", he moved to their fierce rivals at the Camp Nou on a free transfer. The Catalans' supporters were at first hesitant about their new acquisition, but he soon won the hearts of the culers, staying eight years, eventually becoming team captain and scoring several times in El Clásico against his former employers; he passionately celebrated at the Santiago Bernabéu, where he grabbed his jersey after a 25-yard strike that beat the opposing goalkeeper.

Luis Enrique scored 46 La Liga goals in his first three seasons with Barcelona, with the side finishing runner-up in 1996–97 and subsequently winning back-to-back domestic championship accolades. Furthermore, he was named Spanish Player of the Year by El País in the following campaign. He also scored the opening goal in the 1997 UEFA Super Cup, a 3–1 aggregate triumph against Borussia Dortmund.

During his final years in Barcelona, Luis Enrique was often injured, and did not want to renew his contract. He had been offered a deal by his first club Sporting, which he, however, declined, stating that "he wouldn't be able to reach the level he demanded of himself" and that "he wouldn't be doing Sporting much of a favour by going there." His concerns about his level and fitness made him retire on 10 August 2004 at the age of 34, and he finished his professional career with league totals of 400 games and 102 goals, being named by Pelé as one of the top 125 greatest living footballers in March.

== International career ==
Luis Enrique played for Spain in three FIFA World Cups: 1994, 1998 and 2002 (as well as UEFA Euro 1996), and scored 12 goals while earning 62 caps. He was also a member of the gold-winning squad at the 1992 Summer Olympics in Barcelona, and made his debut for the main side on 17 April 1991, featuring for 22 minutes in a 0–2 friendly loss to Romania in Cáceres.

In the 1994 World Cup, held in the United States, Luis Enrique scored his first international goal, in the round-of-16 3–0 win over Switzerland in Washington, D.C. In the 2–1 quarter-final defeat against Italy at the Foxboro Stadium, Mauro Tassotti's elbow made contact with Luis Enrique's face to bloody effect but the incident went unpunished during the match – Tassotti was banned for eight games afterwards; Tassotti later stated he had instantly and deeply regretted his actions, describing them as "stupid" but not premeditated and purely instinctive since his shirt had been pulled by Luis Enrique, and the former personally apologised to the latter. Nonetheless, when Spain met Italy at Euro 2008 on 22 June, to battle for a place in the semi-finals, Luis Enrique reportedly called for the team to "take revenge" for the 1994 World Cup incident by beating Italy. Tassotti, an assistant coach with AC Milan at the time, told the newspaper Marca that he was tired of always being reminded of this incident, and that he had never intended to hurt the Spaniard.

At the 1998 World Cup, Luis Enrique played a major role in a 6–1 rout of Bulgaria in the last game of the group, scoring and assisting once and also winning a penalty, but the Spaniards were eliminated nonetheless. On 5 June of the following year, he scored a hat-trick in a 9–0 win in Villarreal over San Marino in the Euro 2000 qualifiers.

On 23 June 2002, Luis Enrique retired from international football, in order to give the younger players more playing time and focus only on his club.

== Style of play ==
Having occupied several positions, Luis Enrique was most noted for his exceptional versatility and consistency. He was capable of playing anywhere in midfield or along the front line, and was fielded in all positions on the pitch throughout his career, except those of central defender and goalkeeper. His usual position was as an attacking midfielder in the centre of the pitch, due to his ability to link-up the forwards and the midfield, or as a right winger, but he was capable of playing anywhere along the right flank, and was often deployed as an attacking full-back or wing-back, or even as a left winger on occasion.

Due to his keen eye for goal and ability to make attacking runs into the box, Luis Enrique frequently played as a forward, either in a withdrawn role as a second striker behind the team's main goalscorer, or even as an out-and-out striker or centre-forward – he was also used in deeper midfield roles. In addition to his playing abilities, he also stood out for his commitment, temperament, determination and leadership.

== Managerial career ==
=== Barcelona B ===
On 26 May 2008, Luis Enrique returned to Barcelona, taking over the reins of the B team, renamed Barcelona Atlètic for that season; as he succeeded long-time Barcelona teammate Pep Guardiola, he stated: "I have come home" and "I finished playing here and now I will start coaching here". He found success in his second year, helping the club return to Segunda División after an absence of eleven years.

In mid-March 2011, Luis Enrique announced he would leave at the end of the campaign, despite still having two years left on his contract. He led the side to the playoffs, but they were ineligible for promotion.

=== Roma ===
On 8 June 2011, Luis Enrique reached an agreement with Italian Serie A club Roma to become the Giallorossi's new head coach. He signed a two-year contract and was joined by a staff of four members including Iván de la Peña, who played two years for crosstown rivals Lazio, as a technical collaborator.

Roma were eliminated from the UEFA Europa League by Slovan Bratislava, amid great discussion of the substitution of Francesco Totti for Stefano Okaka. The capital-based side also lost their first game in the domestic league against Cagliari, making it just the third time that they lost the opener in 18 years.

Even though he still had two years remaining on his contract, Luis Enrique decided to leave Roma at the end of the season after failure to qualify for any European competition.

=== Celta ===
On 8 June 2013, Luis Enrique became Celta de Vigo's new manager, replacing former national teammate Abel Resino. He led the Galicians to the ninth position in his only season, highlights including a 2–0 home win against Real Madrid that ended the opposition's possibilities of winning the league title.

On 16 May 2014, Luis Enrique announced that he would be leaving Celta.

=== Barcelona ===
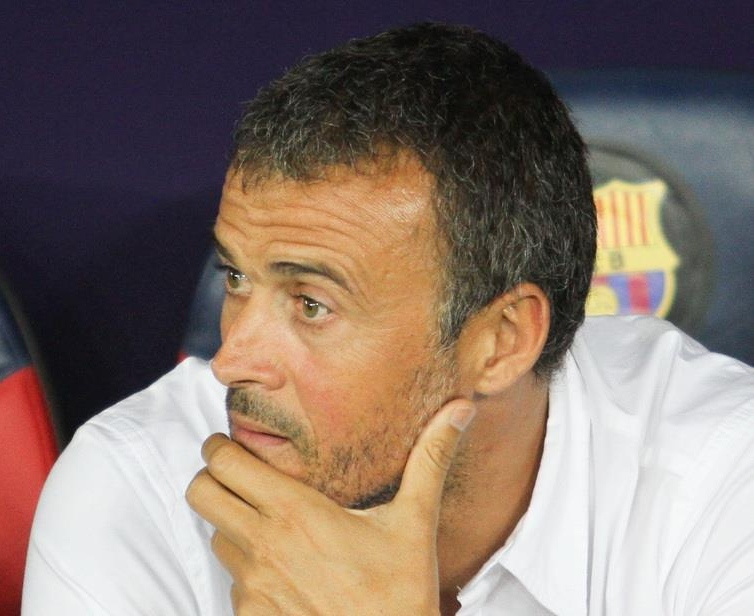
Luis Enrique with Barcelona at the 2015 UEFA Super Cup

On 19 May 2014, Luis Enrique returned to Barcelona as a manager on a two-year deal. He was recommended by sporting director Andoni Zubizarreta, his former national teammate. His first competitive match was a 3–0 home league win over Elche, where he handed debuts to new signings Claudio Bravo, Jérémy Mathieu and Ivan Rakitić, and gave youth products Munir El Haddadi, Rafinha and Sandro Ramírez their maiden league appearances for the club, while summer signing Luis Suárez was unavailable for selection due to suspension.

Luis Enrique suffered his first defeat in the competition on 25 October 2014, away against Real Madrid, and although Barcelona had a successful run in the year, his management came under scrutiny because of his tactics involving several lineup changes in consecutive games. Moreover, a quarrel with Lionel Messi and other players further accentuated the team's poor form.

Amid reports of dressing room unrest and after a defeat to Real Sociedad, Zubizarreta was dismissed in early January, weakening Luis Enrique's standing at the club. A significant upturn in form followed, as a result of the coach deciding on a settled lineup with a tweak in the formation: Messi and Neymar now played as inverted wingers, while Suárez was the lone striker. He soon equaled Guardiola's record of eleven consecutive victories, while the side went on to beat Atlético Madrid and Villarreal convincingly in the Copa del Rey to advance to the final. In the domestic league, after eight wins in nine matches, they returned to the top of the table after 15 weeks.

On 21 April 2015, Luis Enrique recorded his 42nd win after 50 games in charge of Barcelona with a 2–0 victory over Paris Saint-Germain, the best record of any manager. He went on to lead the club to the final of the UEFA Champions League and, on 17 May, led it to its 23rd national championship with one match to spare following a 1–0 win at the Vicente Calderón against Atlético Madrid. On 6 June, having earlier won the domestic cup against Athletic Bilbao by the same score, the team sealed a treble with a 3–1 defeat of Juventus in the Champions League final in Berlin, and three days later he signed a new contract until 2017.

On 11 August 2015, Barcelona won the 2015 UEFA Super Cup 5–4 against Sevilla. On 2 December, against Villanovense in the Copa del Rey round of 32, Luis Enrique decided against bringing on a new player following Mathieu's injury with 12 minutes to go even though two replacements could still be made, as the score was 6–1 at that time and the manager said he did not want to risk introducing players to the game without adequate warm-up.

In his first two seasons, Luis Enrique rotated his goalkeepers, with Bravo playing league games and Marc-André ter Stegen playing cup and European matches. Both players, however, expressed opposition to this policy. A second double was achieved on 22 May 2016, following a 2–0 Copa del Rey victory over Sevilla after extra time in which the team played more than 50 minutes with one player less, following the dismissal of Javier Mascherano.

On 1 March 2017, Luis Enrique announced that he would not continue as team manager after 30 June on expiration of his contract.

=== Spain ===
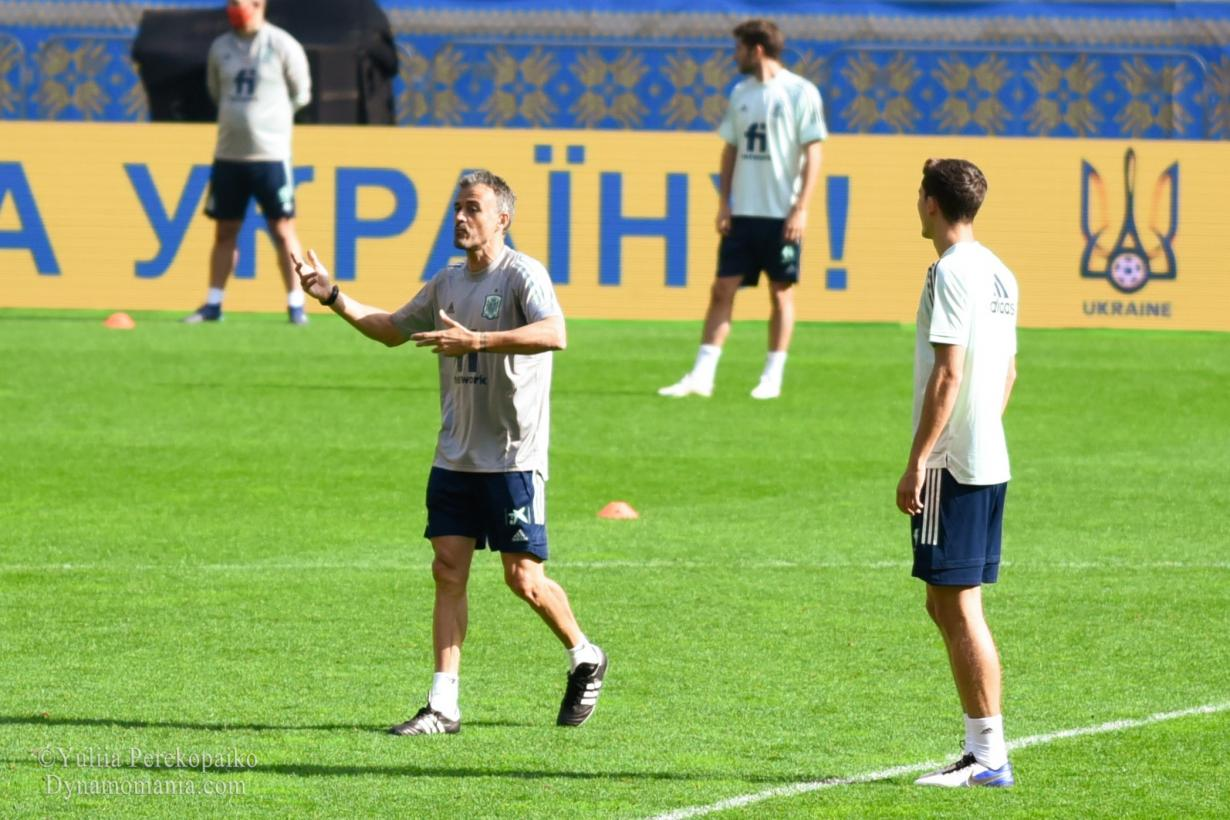
Luis Enrique managing Spain in 2020

Luis Enrique was named coach of the Spain national team on 9 July 2018, replacing former club and country teammate Fernando Hierro. His first match in charge occurred on 8 September, and he led the side to a 2–1 win against England in the UEFA Nations League at Wembley.

In November 2019, Luis Enrique rejoined the national team after having quit his post for personal reasons four months prior. Speaking to the press after his return, a visibly angry Luis Enrique alleged that his friend and colleague of six years Robert Moreno — who managed the national team after his resignation — was "disloyal" and wanted to hold on to his interim position.

When Luis Enrique selected a 24-man Euro 2020 squad (despite being allowed 26) that contained no Real Madrid players, he was accused of having an anti-Madrid bias. Several high-profile omissions from his squad were seen as a way for him to assert control over the dressing room and the team. However, he led Spain to the tournament's semi-finals, in which they lost against Italy on penalties, after a 1–1 draw.

At the 2022 World Cup, Luis Enrique's team were defeated in the round of 16 following another shootout, 3–0 against Morocco. In the wake of this performance, he stepped down from his position.

=== Paris Saint-Germain ===
On 5 July 2023, Luis Enrique officially became the manager of Ligue 1 club Paris Saint-Germain, succeeding Christophe Galtier; he signed a two-year contract. He won a domestic treble in his first season, also reaching the Champions League semi-finals.

PSG renewed their domestic supremacy in 2024–25, losing no matches in the first 28 and winning the league with six to spare. Luis Enrique also led them to retain the Coupe de France and to the final of the Champions League, where they beat Inter Milan 5–0 to complete a continental treble, the first by a French club, while he became the second manager to achieve this twice. He also guided the side to the final of the 2025 FIFA Club World Cup, the first edition of the expanded competition, but lost 3–0 to Chelsea, ending hopes of claiming seven trophies in a calendar year for the first time in history.

On 28 April 2026, Luis Enrique secured his 50th Champions League victory in just 77 matches, surpassing the previous record set by Guardiola who reached the milestone in 80. A month later, his side claimed the French title with a 2–0 win against Lens, marking his third in the competition. He then guided Paris Saint-Germain to a 4–3 shootout victory over Arsenal in the Champions League final following a 1–1 draw after extra time.

== Manager profile ==
=== Tactics ===
One of the most successful managers of his generation, Luis Enrique's incisive and direct football featuring quick transitions from defense to attack, though reliant on the front three of Messi, Suárez and Neymar, was in sharp contrast to the possession-heavy approach of Barcelona managers immediately prior to him. Statistically, Luis Enrique's Barcelona, in his first two years at the club, were better than Guardiola's: Comparatively his team had scored more goals and conceded fewer, had a higher win percentage and won competitions at a similar rate. Guardiola hailed them as the best counter-attacking team in the world.

In his first two seasons at the Camp Nou, Luis Enrique fielded a 4–3–3 formation. Results improved after he stopped changing his starting eleven. The team's creative outlet was the wings with Neymar and Messi as inside forwards flanking Suárez, a departure from their usual playing style. Ivan Rakitić played a pivotal role in transitioning defense to attack, and Andrés Iniesta's influence withered, while Xavi, the club's captain, reduced to a part-time, substitute role. With overlapping full-backs offering width, Neymar and Messi often drifted in-field, encouraging midfielders, Rakitic and Iniesta, to move into channels and attack in and around the box. In his third and final year, struggling for form and results, the manager switched to a 3–4–3 offense morphing into a 4–4–2 defensive shape, reminiscent of Antonio Conte's Premier League winners Chelsea more than Johan Cruyff's Dream Team, with Messi at the top of a midfield diamond, acting as chief play-maker, and Sergio Busquets, the sole holding defensive midfielder, responsible for breaking the first-line of opposition press. The system favoured Neymar in particular, who played as a left forward, often cutting inside to link with lone striker Suárez, or to create an overload in the final-third sharing creative responsibilities with Messi. This change in formation was instrumental as they overcame 4–0, the biggest first-leg deficit in Champions League history, by defeating PSG 6–1 in the second-leg; however, the physical and tactical discipline required to sustain a 3–4–3 proved controversial.

Luis Enrique continued to favour 4–3–3 for Spain, and at times the riskier 3–4–3 when the situation demanded, with the sole defensive midfielder in the pivot being the only commonality. Lacking the front three he had at Barcelona, his football retained positional and vertical aspects, though with box-to-box central midfielders, like Koke or Pedri, offering attacking thrust while the center forward dropped deep to bring wide forwards into play, accompanied by overlapping full-backs who offer width. Whilst pressing oppositions high-up, the center forward, usually Álvaro Morata, screened the opposition defensive midfielder as wide forwards engaged opposition center backs. Spain's defensive midfielder, often Busquets, tracked the run of opposition attackers when they dropped deep, sometimes pressing higher than the team's other central midfielders. In possession, Spain usually started playing out from the back, to draw the opposition in, with Thiago Alcântara or any other central midfielder, dropping alongside Busquets to help progress the ball forward. Should the opposition press aggressively, the full-backs linked up to offer additional passing options as the center backs go deep and narrow. Wide forwards made diagonal runs into the midfield to link play with those in front of them. Once the ball was progressed out of the defense, they adjusted their attacking rhythm to match the opposition's defensive structure, either opting for a speedy transition against a higher block or relying on a more positional approach play against a lower block. To mix it up, Spain initially played short passes in the defensive-third before playing long to the center forward who then attempted to bring outfield runners in to play. Wing play was used to stretch opposition and create spaces infield or create crossing opportunities, especially against compact defenses.

With Paris Saint-Germain, Luis Enrique continued to use an attacking 4–3–3 formation and continued to favour keeping the ball, but placed less emphasis on possession than in the past. He began to incorporate a bold new tactic at kick-offs, where his team's striker would kick the ball out of play deep into the opposition half; during the ensuing throw-in, his team would then apply pressure to their opponents, through heavy pressing, in an attempt to win back the ball in attacking areas. He made use of a balanced approach between attack and defence, with attacking full-backs that could assist at both ends of the pitch, while the movement of his front-three often disoriented opponents.

"I do not treat all of my players the same, just as I do not treat all of my children the same. I have negotiated things with the players. On some things I have been permissive and on some I have been demanding. There are some rules that everyone must follow. That is one of my principles."

— Luis Enrique, speaking to the press after falling out with Messi in January 2015.

Known for his brave and fearless management style, Luis Enrique is quick to remove any influence that undermines his authority. Reports of his altercation with Messi at Barcelona and with Totti at Roma, both of whom wielded considerable power at their respective clubs, being prime examples of that. His flexibility in adopting different playing styles, while at odds with the possession-based style synonymous with Barcelona, furthered this narrative, as he continued to remain unfazed in the face of criticism and pressure. Royal Spanish Football Federation president Luis Rubiales, on the back of three consecutive unsuccessful tournaments, appointed him to curb ill-discipline and complacency in the squad, stating: "We are looking for an incontestable leader, who sets out the path, and nobody then strays from that path."

Luis Enrique has also been known to drop or sell key players in his team whom he feels are not suited to his system or philosophy, as was the case with Kylian Mbappé and Gianluigi Donnarumma at Paris Saint-Germain.

=== Reception ===
Messi described Luis Enrique as one of the two best managers he played for, the other being Guardiola. While Guardiola maintained that though he took on many great footballing sides as a head coach, Luis Enrique's Barcelona and Jürgen Klopp's Liverpool were the best he ever faced.

In comparing the coaches he played for, Spain international Alcântara said: "[Luis Enrique] has the analytical positioning of Pep [and] the aggressiveness of Klopp", while also praising Luis Enrique's communication skills in conveying his footballing ideas.

=== Relations with journalists ===
Luis Enrique had a strained relationship with journalists. In September 2024, he claimed that he would gladly take a 50% cut in his salary if that meant he could avoid speaking to them.

== Endorsements ==
Luis Enrique was sponsored by sportswear company Nike, and appeared in commercials for the brand. In a global advertising campaign in the run-up to the 2002 World Cup in South Korea and Japan, he starred in a "Secret Tournament" commercial (branded "Scorpion KO") directed by Terry Gilliam, appearing alongside footballers such as Luís Figo, Thierry Henry, Hidetoshi Nakata, Roberto Carlos, Ronaldinho, Ronaldo and Totti, with former player Eric Cantona the tournament "referee".

== Personal life ==
Luis Enrique married his longtime partner Elena Cullell on 27 December 1997. Their youngest daughter, Xana, died of bone cancer at age 9 on 29 August 2019; they also had son Pacho (born 1998) and daughter Sira (2000), with the latter dedicating herself to equestrianism.

After retiring from football, Luis Enrique lived for a while in Australia to practice surfing. He took part in the 2005 edition of the New York City Marathon, finished the Amsterdam Marathon in 2006, the Florence Marathon in 2007 and the Marathon des Sables in 2008, while also entering and finishing Frankfurt Ironman in 2007; he was due to take part in the Ironman Triathlon the following year, but eventually declined due to his engagement as manager of Barcelona B.

== Career statistics ==
=== Club ===
Appearances and goals by club, season and competition
Club	Season	League			Cup		Europe		Other		Total	
Club	Season	Division	Apps	Goals	Apps	Goals	Apps	Goals	Apps	Goals	Apps	Goals
Sporting Gijón B	1989–90	Segunda División B	27	5	–		–		–		27	5
Sporting Gijón	1989–90	La Liga	1	0	–		–		–		1	0
Sporting Gijón	1990–91	La Liga	35	15	9	3	–		–		44	18
Sporting Gijón	Total		36	15	9	3	0	0	0	0	45	18
Real Madrid	1991–92	La Liga	29	4	6	1	6	0	–		41	5
Real Madrid	1992–93	La Liga	34	2	6	0	8	1	–		48	3
Real Madrid	1993–94	La Liga	28	2	4	1	6	0	2 (Note: Appearances in Supercopa de España)	0	40	3
Real Madrid	1994–95	La Liga	35	4	2	0	6	0	–		43	4
Real Madrid	1995–96	La Liga	31	3	0	0	8	0	2	0	41	3
Real Madrid	Total		157	15	18	2	34	1	4	0	213	18
Barcelona	1996–97	La Liga	35	17	7	1	7	0	2	0	51	18
Barcelona	1997–98	La Liga	34	18	6	3	6	4	1	0	47	25
Barcelona	1998–99	La Liga	26	11	3	0	3	1	2	0	34	12
Barcelona	1999–2000	La Liga	19	3	5	3	7	6	2	0	33	12
Barcelona	2000–01	La Liga	28	9	4	1	9	6	–		41	16
Barcelona	2001–02	La Liga	23	4	0	0	15	6	–		38	10
Barcelona	2002–03	La Liga	18	8	0	0	8	2	–		26	10
Barcelona	2003–04	La Liga	24	3	1	0	5	2	–		30	5
Barcelona	Total		207	73	26	8	60	27	7	0	300	108
Career total			427	108	53	13	94	28	11	0	585	149

=== International ===
Appearances and goals by national team and year
National team	Year	Apps	Goals
Spain	1991	1	0
Spain	1992	0	0
Spain	1993	2	0
Spain	1994	9	3
Spain	1995	8	0
Spain	1996	9	2
Spain	1997	4	2
Spain	1998	8	1
Spain	1999	8	4
Spain	2000	3	0
Spain	2001	5	0
Spain	2002	5	0
Total		62	12

Scores and results list Spain's goal tally first, score column indicates score after each Luis Enrique goal.

List of international goals scored by Luis Enrique
No.	Date	Venue	Opponent	Score	Result	Competition
1	2 July 1994	RFK Memorial, Washington, United States	Switzerland	2–0	3–0	1994 FIFA World Cup
2	16 November 1994	Sánchez Pizjuán, Seville, Spain	Denmark	3–0	3–0	UEFA Euro 1996 qualifying
3	17 December 1994	Constant Vanden Stock, Brussels, Belgium	Belgium	4–1	4–1	UEFA Euro 1996 qualifying
4	4 September 1996	Svangaskarð, Toftir, Faroe Islands	Faroe Islands	1–0	6–2	1998 FIFA World Cup qualification
5	13 November 1996	Heliodoro Rodríguez López, Tenerife, Spain	Slovakia	3–1	4–1	1998 FIFA World Cup qualification
6	11 October 1997	El Molinón, Gijón, Spain	Faroe Islands	1–0	3–1	1998 FIFA World Cup qualification
7	11 October 1997	El Molinón, Gijón, Spain	Faroe Islands	3–1	3–1	1998 FIFA World Cup qualification
8	24 June 1998	Félix Bollaert, Lens, France	Bulgaria	2–0	6–1	1998 FIFA World Cup
9	5 June 1999	El Madrigal, Villarreal, Spain	San Marino	2–0	9–0	UEFA Euro 2000 qualifying
10	5 June 1999	El Madrigal, Villarreal, Spain	San Marino	6–0	9–0	UEFA Euro 2000 qualifying
11	5 June 1999	El Madrigal, Villarreal, Spain	San Marino	7–0	9–0	UEFA Euro 2000 qualifying
12	4 September 1999	Ernst Happel, Vienna, Austria	Austria	3–1	3–1	UEFA Euro 2000 qualifying

== Managerial statistics ==
As of match played 21 November 2026

Managerial record by team and tenure
Team	From	To	Record								Ref
Team	From	To	G	W	D	L	GF	GA	GD	Win %	Ref
Barcelona B	26 May 2008	8 June 2011	124	59	40	25	208	139	+69	47.58	
Roma	8 June 2011	13 May 2012	42	17	9	16	64	59	+5	40.48	
Celta	8 June 2013	17 May 2014	40	15	7	18	50	58	−8	37.50	
Barcelona	19 May 2014	29 May 2017	181	138	22	21	519	147	+372	76.24	
Spain	9 July 2018	26 March 2019	8	6	0	2	21	9	+12	75.00	
Spain	19 November 2019	8 December 2022	39	20	14	5	76	28	+48	51.28	
Paris Saint-Germain	5 July 2023	Present	191	130	34	27	467	188	+279	68.06	
Total			625	385	126	114	1,403	626	+777	61.60	—

== Honours ==
=== Player ===
Real Madrid

- La Liga: 1994–95
- Copa del Rey: 1992–93
- Supercopa de España: 1993

Barcelona

- La Liga: 1997–98, 1998–99
- Copa del Rey: 1996–97, 1997–98
- Supercopa de España: 1996
- UEFA Cup Winners' Cup: 1996–97
- UEFA Super Cup: 1997

Spain U23

- Summer Olympic Games: 1992

Individual

- La Liga Breakthrough Player: 1990–91
- ESM Team of the Year: 1996–97
- FIFA 100

=== Manager ===
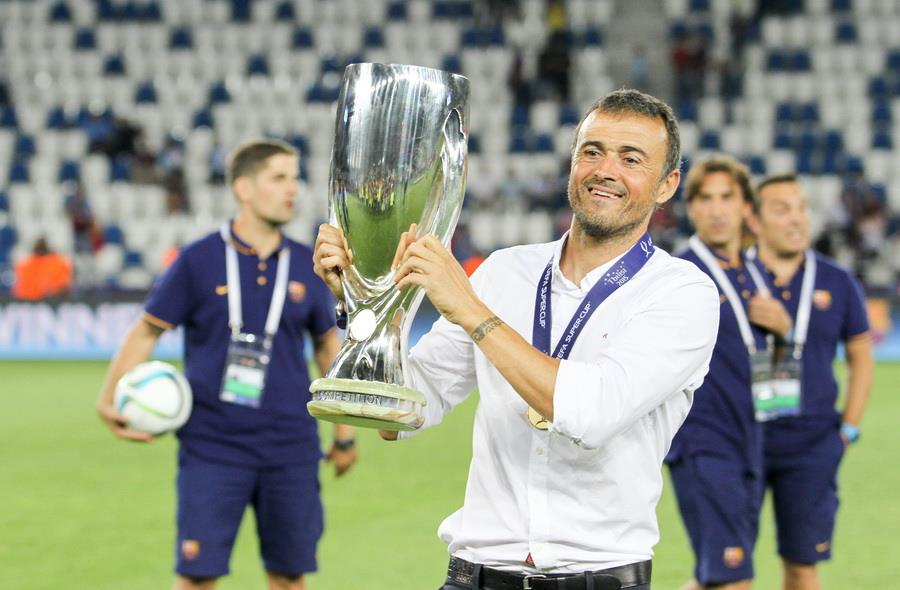
Luis Enrique with the 2015 UEFA Super Cup trophy

Barcelona

- La Liga: 2014–15, 2015–16
- Copa del Rey: 2014–15, 2015–16, 2016–17
- Supercopa de España: 2016
- UEFA Champions League: 2014–15
- UEFA Super Cup: 2015
- FIFA Club World Cup: 2015

Paris Saint-Germain

- Ligue 1: 2023–24, 2024–25, 2025–26
- Coupe de France: 2023–24, 2024–25
- Trophée des Champions: 2023, 2024, 2025
- UEFA Champions League: 2024–25, 2025–26
- UEFA Super Cup: 2025, 2026
- FIFA Intercontinental Cup: 2025
- FIFA Club World Cup runner-up: 2025

Spain

- UEFA Nations League runner-up: 2020–21

Individual

- La Liga Coach of the Year: 2015
- FIFA World Coach of the Year: 2015
- IFFHS World's Best Club Coach: 2015, 2025
- World Soccer Manager of the Year: 2015, 2025
- La Liga Manager of the Month: May 2016
- UNFP Ligue 1 Manager of the Year: 2024–25
- Men's Johan Cruyff Trophy: 2025
- The Best FIFA Football Coach: 2025
- Globe Soccer Awards Coach of the Year: 2025
- Onze d'Or Coach of the Year: 2024–25

== See also ==
- List of FC Barcelona players (100+ appearances)
- List of La Liga players (400+ appearances)
- List of Real Madrid CF players
- List of footballers with 400 or more La Liga appearances
