= Roberto Molina (footballer, born 1971) =

Argentine footballer

Personal information
- Full name: Roberto Antonio Molina
- Date of birth: 28 October 1971 (age 55)
- Place of birth: Mendoza, Argentina
- Height: 1.76 m (5 ft 9 in)
- Position: Midfielder

Senior career*
Years	Team	Apps	(Gls)
1990–1993	Ferro Carril Oeste	49	(0)
1994–1995	Rosario Central	54	(7)
1995–1998	Independiente	63	(1)
1998	América	8	(0)
1999	Atlante	32	(4)
2000	Toros Neza	15	(2)
2000	Puebla	13	(0)
2001	Universitario de Deportes		
2001	Veracruz		
2002	Barcelona		
2003	Racing	5	(0)
2004	Ferro Carril Oeste		

International career
1991	Argentina U20	3	(1)
1996	Argentina	1	(0)
- * Club domestic league appearances and goals

Roberto Antonio Molina (born 28 October 1971 in Mendoza) is a former Argentine footballer.

== Club career ==
Molina played for Ferro Carril Oeste, Rosario Central, Independiente and Racing in the Primera División Argentina. Molina played several seasons in the Primera División de México, with América, Atlante, Toros Neza and Puebla. He also had a brief spell with Barcelona in Ecuador.

Molina also earned one cap for Argentina, coming on as a substitute in a World Cup qualifying match against Venezuela on October 9, 1996. He also played for Argentina at the 1991 FIFA World Youth Championship finals in Portugal.
