= Fawaz Mando =

Syrian footballer (born 1971)

Personal information
- Full name: Fawaz Iyad Mando
- Date of birth: 27 December 1971 (age 54)
- Place of birth: Homs, Syria
- Height: 1.77 m (5 ft 10 in)
- Position: Midfielder

Youth career
- 1980–1988: Al-Karamah

Senior career*
Years	Team	Apps	(Gls)
1988–2000	Al-Karamah		

International career
1987–1991	Syria U20		
1991–2000	Syria	2	(0)
- * Club domestic league appearances and goals

Fawaz Iyad Mando (Arabic: فواز مندو; born 27 December 1971) is a Syrian former footballer who played as a midfielder for Al-Karamah and Syria national team.

== Career ==
Mando spent his entire career in Al-Karamah, from 1988 until 2000. He won the Syrian Premier League in 1996, and the Syrian Cup in 1995 and 1996.

Mando played for the Syria U20 in many tournaments: 1988 AFC Youth Championship, 1989 FIFA World Youth Championship, 1990 AFC Youth Championship, and 1991 FIFA World Youth Championship. Later on, he played for Syria until 2000.
