= Sergei Mosyagin =

Soviet footballer and football coach

Personal information
- Full name: Sergei Mikhailovich Mosyagin
- Date of birth: 29 December 1937
- Place of birth: Mozharskiy District, Ryazan Oblast, Russian SFSR, USSR
- Date of death: 25 November 2011 (aged 73)
- Place of death: Moscow, Russia
- Position: Defender

Youth career
- 1950s: ? (Podolsk)

Senior career*
Years	Team	Apps	(Gls)
1950s	FC Dynamo-2 Moscow	?	(?)
1956–1958	FC MVO Moscow	?	(?)
1959–1962	FC SKIF Moscow	?	(?)

Managerial career
- 1963–1966: Znamya Truda Orekhovo-Zuyevo
- 1967–1970: Russian SFSR youth team
- 1971–1973: Zenit Izhevsk
- 1973: Soviet Sports Committee (Football Administration) staff
- 1974–1975: Soviet Union youth team (assistant)
- 1975–1978: Soviet Union youth team
- 1979: Soviet Union (assistant)
- 1980: Pakhtakor Tashkent
- 1981–1982: Soviet Union youth team
- 1983: Soviet Union (assistant)
- 1984–1985: Soviet Union youth team
- 1986–1990: Soviet Union (assistant)
- 1990–1992: UAE youth team & UAE (assistant)
- * Club domestic league appearances and goals

Sergei Mosyagin (Russian: Сергей Михайлович Мосягин) was a Soviet footballer and football coach.

In 1970s after winning the 1977 FIFA World Youth Championship, he was awarded honorary titles of Merited Coach of the Soviet Union and Merited Coach of the Russian SFSR (Russia).
