= Renato Marsiglia =

Brazilian football referee

Renato Marsiglia (born 3 June 1951 in Rio Grande, Rio Grande do Sul) is a retired Brazilian football referee. He is known for supervising two matches during the 1994 FIFA World Cup in the United States.

Marsiglia also officiated at the 1991 and 1993 FIFA World Youth Championships, as well as the 1994 World Cup qualifiers.

He was a Rede Globo football commentator who specialized in analysing referee's performances, until 2018.
