= Ammar Awad =

Syrian footballer (born 1968)

Personal information
- Date of birth: 1 August 1968 (age 58)
- Place of birth: Latakia, Syria
- Position: Midfielder

Senior career*
Years	Team	Apps	(Gls)
1989–1994	Hutteen		
1989–1994	Toulon		

International career
1988–1996	Syria		
- * Club domestic league appearances and goals

Ammar Awad (Arabic: عمار عوض; born 1 August 1968) is a former Syrian footballer who played for Syria national football team.
