= Hatem Ghaeb =

Syrian footballer (born 1971)

Personal information
- Date of birth: 25 September 1971 (age 55)
- Place of birth: Al-Asharah, Syria
- Position: Defender

Senior career*
Years	Team	Apps	(Gls)
1987–2000	Al-Shorta		

International career
1990–1991	Syria U20	8	(0)
1992–1997	Syria	10	(0)
- * Club domestic league appearances and goals

Hatem Ghaeb (Arabic: حاتم الغايب) is a Syrian football defender who played for Syria in the 1996 Asian Cup.

== Early life ==
Ghaeb was born in 1971 in Al-Asharah, Deir ez-Zor Governorate, which indicates to age fabrication, to enable him to participate in the youth tournaments, as he was registered as born on 25 September 1971.

== Career ==
Ghaeb played his entire career for Al-Shorta from 1987 to 2000. He played for Syria U20 in the 1990 AFC Youth Championship and 1991 FIFA World Youth Championship.

In December 2019, Ghaeb was voted to be the Chairman of the Syrian Arab Federation for Football. In June 2023, it was reported that the Ministry of Finance issued a "seizure" directive targeting the assets of various entities and individuals including Ghaeb and his spouse, demanding €1 million, linked to his past engagements within the federation.

== See also ==
- List of one-club men
