= Anwar Hussein (photographer) =

Tanzanian photojournalist (1938–2024)

- Born: 3 November 1938; Chunya, Tanganyika (now Tanzania)
- Died: 23 September 2024 (aged 85)
- Known for: Royal photography
- Website: http://www.anwarhussein.com/

Anwar Hussein (3 November 1938 – 23 September 2024) was a Tanganyika-born British photojournalist and author. In 2016, he became the longest-serving photographer covering the British royal family and Queen Elizabeth II.

He changed perceptions of the royal family through shooting casual photographs instead of formal portrait photography. Elizabeth II and The Queen Mother used his photographs on their Christmas cards.

Two of Hussein's sons became royal photographers working independently of him.

Anwar Hussein died after a long illness on 23 September 2024, at the age of 85.
