= Sergei Mamchur =

Russian footballer

Personal information
- Full name: Sergei Nikolaevich Mamchur
- Date of birth: 3 February 1972
- Place of birth: Dnipropetrovsk, Ukrainian SSR
- Date of death: 26 December 1997 (aged 25)
- Place of death: Moscow, Russia
- Height: 1.79 m (5 ft 10 in)
- Position: Defender

Youth career
- Dnipro-75 Dnipropetrovsk

Senior career*
Years	Team	Apps	(Gls)
1988–1992	Dnipro Dnipropetrovsk	37	(0)
1992	Asmaral Moscow	3	(0)
1993–1997	CSKA Moscow	112	(12)

International career
1991	USSR U20		
1992–1994	Russia U21		
Medal record
Men's football
Representing Soviet Union
FIFA World Youth Championship
Bronze medal – third place	1991 Portugal
UEFA European Under-18 Championship
Winner	1990 Hungary
- * Club domestic league appearances and goals

Sergei Nikolaevich Mamchur (Russian: Серге́й Николаевич Мамчур; 3 February 1972 – 26 December 1997) was a Russian football defender.

== International ==
He was capped for the USSR U-20 team at the 1991 FIFA World Youth Championship.

== Honours ==
- UEFA European Under-18 Championship champion: 1990

== Death ==
He died in his Moscow apartment due to a heart failure. Mamchur was buried in his hometown Dnipro.
