= Serhiy Shcherbakov =

Ukrainian footballer (born 1971)

Sergei Scherbakov
Personal information
- Full name: Sergei Gennadiyevich Scherbakov
- Date of birth: 15 August 1971 (age 55)
- Place of birth: Bryansk, Russian SFSR, USSR
- Height: 1.80 m (5 ft 11 in)
- Position: Midfielder

Youth career
- Shakhtar Donetsk

Senior career*
Years	Team	Apps	(Gls)
1988–1992	Shakhtar Donetsk	70	(16)
1992–1993	Sporting CP	25	(5)

International career
1990	USSR U18		
1991	USSR U20	6	(5)
1991	USSR U21	3	(1)
1992	Ukraine	2	(0)
1992	Russia U21	6	(7)
Medal record
Men's football
Representing Soviet Union
FIFA World Youth Championship
Bronze medal – third place	1991 Portugal
UEFA European Under-18 Championship
Winner	1990 Hungary
- * Club domestic league appearances and goals

Sergei Gennadiyevich Scherbakov (Russian: Серге́й Геннадиевич Щербаков, Ukrainian: Сергій Геннадiйович Щербаков, Serhiy Hennadiyovych Shcherbakov; born 15 August 1971) is a Ukrainian former professional footballer who played as a midfielder.

In Portuguese media and some FIFA sources, the footballer is also known as Serguei Cherbakov. In Portugal Scherbakov was known as a Russian footballer despite the fact of playing for Ukraine.

== Career ==
A native of Bryansk, a city near the border with Ukraine, Sergei was born in a sports family where his father was a footballer for Soviet Novator Mariupol playing as a central defender, while mother of Sergei was a gymnast. As an athlete, he was brought up by youth coaches of Shakhtar and soon made his way to the main squad, already at his 17 he played his first game. His first coaches were Mykola Kryvenko and Petro Ponomarenko who were former players of the Soviet "teams of masters" (professional footballers).

Shcherbakov made his debut for the Shakhtar senior team in the USSR Federation Cup on 16 June 1988 in an away match against FC Kairat out of Almaty. He was substituted out on 61st minute by Oleksandr Barabash and his team lost 3–1. He made his debut in a league match on 30 March 1989 when Shakhtar was visiting Metalist Kharkiv in a Round 4 game. Shcherbakov came out on substitution for Ihor Petrov on 50th minute when Shakhtar was one goal behind but was not able to change outcome of the game and Shakhtar lost 2–1. Until 1990 he continued to play for the Shakhtar reserve team in parallel league competition. His first goal for the Shakhtar senior team Shcherbakov scored on 9 March 1990 in the Round 2 league away match against Pamir Dushanbe, which Shakhtar lost 2–1, nonetheless.

In total, Shcherbakov played in the Soviet Top League 52 games over three seasons and scored 12 times. With dissolution of the Soviet Union, he along with Shakhtar joined the Vyshcha Liha that commenced on territory of the independent Ukraine.

His first game in Ukrainian competitions was the Round 1 league away match against Metalurh Zaporizhia on 7 March 1992. Shcherbakov played all 90 minutes and Shakhtar tied the game at 1. His first goal in Ukrainian competitions occurred in his first cup game when Shakhtar was hosting Karpaty Lviv as part of the 1992 Ukrainian Cup Round of 16 second leg match on 14 March 1992. Shakhtar won the game 2–0 and Shcherbakov was one of the two scorers.

He capped for USSR U-20 team at the 1991 FIFA World Youth Championship. He shared the golden shoe with Pedro Pineda in that tournament as the highest scorer with four goals. In 1991 following the performance of the Soviet youth teams, Scherbakov was invited to PSV Eindhoven where he spent six weeks, but for uncertain reasons was not able to sign a contract. After receiving an offer from Sporting in 1992 he did not think twice.

Shcherbakov had been brought to Sporting CP by Bobby Robson who also joined the club in July 1992. At that time among his assistants Robson had José Mourinho. Robson was complaining about "terrible situation" in the club and periodically had arguments with the club's president. The manager was fired following their Uefa Cup exit against Casino Salzburg during winter break of the 1993–94 season with Sporting CP in the lead. The players hosted a dinner party for him, but afterwards Shcherbakov was involved in a serious car accident that left him paralysed from the waist down, and has used a wheelchair ever since. Shcherbakov went to a pub used by the Russian community, stayed until early hours and then shot a set of traffic lights. His car was hit side on. Had he been wearing the seat belt, the injuries would have been minor. The Resident newspaper also reported that he had been "over the legal alcohol limit" at the time and had jumped a red light. The accident fractured Shcherbakov's skull and his spinal column in three places. During rehabilitation he vowed he would once again don the Sporting jersey on the pitch someday, but he never regained use of his legs. After the crash, Sir Bobby Robson said that had the crash not happened, Shcherbakov would have gone on to become one of the best midfielders in Europe. He was only 22.

== Later life ==
Shcherbakov works with several football-related charities, such as the Federation of Football that unites football lovers that have cerebral paralysis, as well as a youth scout, and lives in Moscow.

== Career statistics ==
=== Club ===
Appearances and goals by club, season and competition
Club	Season	League			National cup		Continental		Other		Total	
Club	Season	Division	Apps	Goals	Apps	Goals	Apps	Goals	Apps	Goals	Apps	Goals
Shakhtar Donetsk	1988	Soviet Top League	0	0	1	0	0	0	1	0	2	0
Shakhtar Donetsk	1989	Soviet Top League	15	0	3	0	0	0	4	0	22	0
Shakhtar Donetsk	1990	Soviet Top League	17	5	3	0	0	0	2	0	22	5
Shakhtar Donetsk	1991	Soviet Top League	20	7	2	0	0	0	0	0	22	7
Shakhtar Donetsk	1992	Vyshcha Liha	18	4	5	3	0	0	0	0	23	7
Shakhtar Donetsk	Total		70	16	14	3	0	0	7	0	91	19
Sporting CP	1992–93	Primeira Divisão	17	4	4	0	0	0	0	0	21	4
Sporting CP	1993–94	Primeira Divisão	8	1	1	0	6 (Note: Appearances in UEFA Cup)	1	0	0	15	2
Sporting CP	Total		25	5	5	0	6	1	0	0	36	6
Career total			95	21	19	3	6	1	7	0	127	25

=== International ===
Appearances and goals by national team and year
National team	Year	Apps	Goals
Ukraine	1992	2	0
Total		2	0

== Honours ==
Soviet Union U18

- UEFA European Under-18 Championship: 1990

Individual

- FIFA World Youth Championship Golden Boot: 1991
