= Francisco Lamolina =

Argentine football referee

Francisco Oscar Lamolina
- Full name: Francisco Oscar "Pancho" Lamolina
- Born: 25 October 1950; Argentina

Domestic
Years	League	Role

International
Years	League	Role
1994	FIFA listed	Referee

Francisco Oscar "Pancho" Lamolina (October 25, 1950 - August 17, 2025) is an Argentine former football (soccer) referee.

He was an official at 1994 FIFA World Cup.

He was known in Argentine First Division for his laissez-faire style into the field, completely opposed to the strictness of Javier Castrilli's.

Even though he was highly regarded in the 1980s, towards the end of his career he was criticized for his style, that allowed much rudeness to go unpunished. His classic gesture was to simulate pushing a cart to suggest movement, sometimes (allegedly) accompanied by his saying siga, siga ("go on, go on"), which became a derogatory way of making allusion to this school of refereeing.
