= Luiz Fernando Gomes =

Brazilian footballer (born 1971)

Luiz Fernando
Personal information
- Full name: Luiz Fernando Gomes da Costa
- Date of birth: 15 November 1971 (age 54)
- Place of birth: Porto Alegre, Brazil
- Height: 1.72 m (5 ft 8 in)
- Position: Central midfielder

Youth career
- –1991: Internacional

Senior career*
Years	Team	Apps	(Gls)
1990–1992	Internacional		
1992–1994	Real Madrid	0	(0)
1992–1993	→ Braga (loan)	7	(0)
1993–1994	→ Real Madrid B (loan)	44	(9)
1994	Internacional		
1995–1997	Cruzeiro	83	(16)
1996	→ Rio Branco-SP (loan)		
1997	XV de Piracicaba		
1997	Londrina		
1997	Rio Branco-SP		
1998	América-SP		
1998	Ponte Preta		
1999–2000	Guarani		
2000	Goiás		
2001	Guarani		
2001	Gama		
2002	Marília		
2002	Santo André		
2003	Brasiliense		
2004	Pelotas		

International career
1991	Brazil U20	6	(2)
- * Club domestic league appearances and goals

Luiz Fernando Gomes da Costa (born 15 November 1971), simply known as Luiz Fernando or Luiz Fernando Gomes, is a Brazilian former professional footballer who played as a central midfielder.

== Career ==
Central midfielder for the Brazilian team in the 1991 FIFA World Youth Championship, Luiz Fernando caught the attention of Real Madrid and was signed for the following season. Loaned to S.C. Braga and Real Madrid B, he did not adapt to European football, returning to Internacional. Because he played for both Internacional and Cruzeiro with Luís Fernando Flores, he ended up becoming Luiz Fernando Gomes to differentiate himself. Played for several clubs in Brazil, without much prominence, ending his career at EC Pelotas in 2004.

== Honours ==
Internacional

- Campeonato Gaúcho: 1991

Cruzeiro

- Copa Master de Supercopa: 1995
- Campeonato Mineiro: 1996

Brazil U20

- South American U-20 Championship: 1991

Individual

- 1990 Bola de Prata
