= Abdullah Mando =

Syrian footballer (born 1971)

Personal information
- Date of birth: 9 October 1971 (age 55)
- Place of birth: Syria
- Position: Midfielder

Senior career*
Years	Team	Apps	(Gls)
- Tishreen

International career
- Syria U20
- Syria
- * Club domestic league appearances and goals

Abdullah Mando (Arabic: عبد الله مندو; born 9 October 1971) is a Syrian former footballer who played as a midfielder for Tishreen and the Syria national team.
