= Berto (footballer) =

Spanish footballer (born 1962)

Personal information
- Full name: Alberto Martínez Díaz
- Date of birth: 27 October 1962 (age 63)
- Place of birth: Lugo, Spain
- Height: 1.70 m (5 ft 7 in)
- Position: Midfielder

Youth career
- Figaredo

Senior career*
Years	Team	Apps	(Gls)
1980–1984	Caudal	125	(19)
1984–1999	Oviedo	447	(19)
1999–2001	Ponferradina	46	(0)
2001–2003	Águilas	1	(0)
2003–2004	Astur	32	(1)
Total		651	(39)

International career
1991	Spain	1	(0)
- * Club domestic league appearances and goals

Alberto Martínez Díaz (born 27 October 1962), known as Berto (Spanish pronunciation: [ˈbeɾto]), is a Spanish former professional footballer who played as a midfielder.

== Club career ==
Born in Lugo, Galicia, Berto's career was mainly associated with Real Oviedo for which he played 15 seasons, appearing in a team-best 512 official matches. He signed in 1984 from Asturias neighbours Caudal Deportivo in the lower leagues, and spent his first four years in the Segunda División, promoting to La Liga in 1988.

Berto made his debut in the Spanish top flight on 3 September 1988, playing the full 90 minutes in a 1–0 home win against Real Sociedad and scoring one of his six league goals during the campaign. He only competed at that level until his departure in 1999, more often than not as a starter and captain, and added two appearances in the UEFA Cup with his main club, both in the 1991–92 edition.

Berto retired from football in 2004 at the age of 41, after spells with SD Ponferradina in the Segunda División B and amateurs Águilas CF and Astur CF. For his transfer to the latter, he revealed he received death threats.

== International career ==
Berto earned one cap for Spain, the occurrence taking place on 4 September 1991 as he came on as a 56th minute substitute for Manolo in a 2–1 friendly victory over Uruguay in Oviedo.

== Honours ==
Oviedo

- Copa de la Liga (Segunda División): 1985
