= Mahmoud Abdul Razak =

Syrian footballer (born 1971)

Personal information
- Date of birth: 27 November 1971 (age 54)
- Place of birth: Syria
- Position: Defender

Senior career*
Years	Team	Apps	(Gls)
- Al-Fotuwa

International career
- Syria U20
- Syria
- * Club domestic league appearances and goals

Mahmoud Abdul Razak (Arabic: محمود عبد الرزاق; born 27 November 1971) is a Syrian former footballer who played as a defender for the Syria national team.
