= Paul Okon =

Australian soccer player (born 1972)

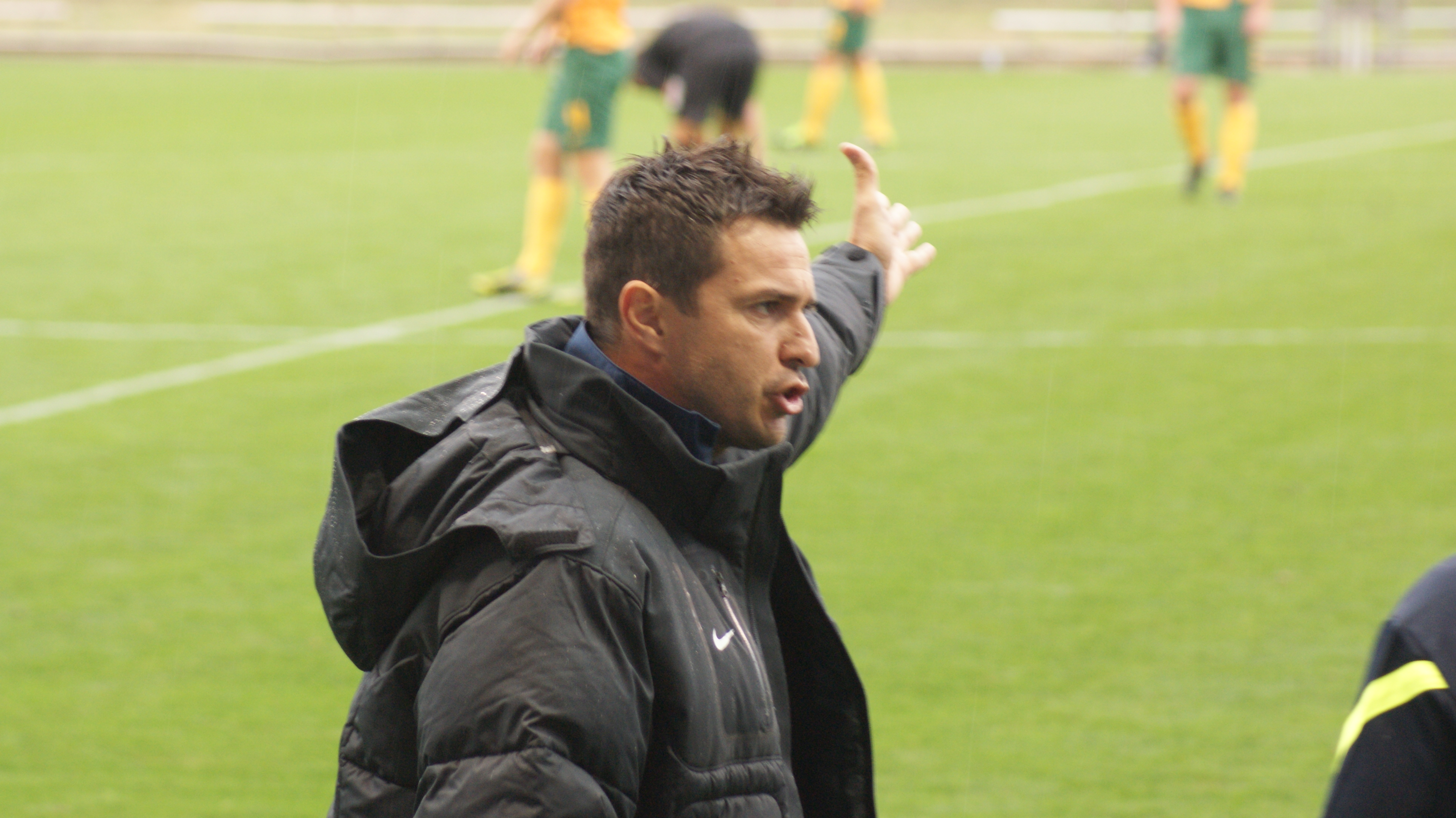
- Okon coaching the Australia youth

Personal information
- Full name: Paul Michael Okon
- Date of birth: 5 April 1972 (age 54)
- Place of birth: Sydney, Australia
- Height: 1.77 m (5 ft 10 in)
- Positions: Defender; midfielder

Team information
- Current team: Australia (assistant)

Senior career*
Years	Team	Apps	(Gls)
1989–1991	Marconi Stallions	49	(4)
1991–1996	Club Brugge	72	(1)
1996–1999	Lazio	19	(0)
1999–2000	Fiorentina	11	(0)
2000–2002	Middlesbrough	28	(0)
2002	→ Watford (loan)	15	(0)
2002–2003	Leeds United	15	(0)
2003–2004	Vicenza	28	(2)
2004–2005	Oostende	33	(0)
2005–2006	APOEL	9	(0)
2006–2007	Newcastle Jets	17	(0)
Total		296	(9)

International career
1991	Australia U20	4	(0)
1992	Australia U23	3	(0)
1991–2003	Australia	28	(0)

Managerial career
- 2012–2016: Australia U20
- 2016–2018: Central Coast Mariners
- 2024–: Australia (assistant)
Medal record
Representing Australia
Men's Association football
FIFA Confederations Cup
Third place	2001 South Korea-Japan
OFC Nations Cup
Winner	2000 Tahiti
OFC U-20 Championship
Winner	1990 Fiji
- * Club domestic league appearances and goals

Paul Michael Okon (/ˈoːkɔn/; born 5 April 1972) is an Australian former soccer player who played as a defender or midfielder.

He previously captained the Australia national team and has represented Australia Olympic Football Team at the 1992 Summer Olympics in Barcelona. Okon's career began at Marconi Stallions in the old NSL in Australia. He then went on to play at many European clubs including Lazio and Fiorentina in Italy's Serie A, Vicenza in Serie B, Middlesbrough and Leeds United in the English Premier League, Club Brugge, Oostende in Belgium's Jupiler League and APOEL in the Cypriot First Division. Okon was inducted into the Australian Football Hall of Fame in 2009, for his services to football in Australia.

== Club career ==
Okon grew up in a Sydney suburb of Bossley Park. He is of German and Italian descent. He represented his high school, Patrician Brothers' College, Fairfield during his time as a teenage schoolboy and featured prominently in all teams including the A Grade squad. However, his abilities did not stop at the football pitch. He set the record for high jump at the college's annual athletics carnival in the under 16s age group which was not broken until 2004.

Okon left Marconi Stallions in 1991 for Club Brugge, and due to a series of excellent performances at sweeper won the Belgian Golden Shoe (95/96), the Belgian Jupiler league (95/96) and two Belgian Cups (94/95 and 95/96). These performances captured the attention of some of Europe's biggest clubs, and in 1996 Dino Zoff – then coach of Italian giants Lazio – flew out to Belgium to personally sign the Australian, stipulating in his contract that Okon would play sweeper and promising first team football. However, with the departure of Roberto Di Matteo to Chelsea – forcing him to play in midfield – and a succession of knee injuries (a problem caused by a misaligned pelvis, the result of a childhood car-crash) resulted in game-time being limited. While he did return for the 1999 Scudetto decider (playing in one of the final games of the season against Juventus, which Lazio lost, handing the title to Milan), that summer he departed the Roman club.

This began a turbulent chapter of Okon's career, with spells at Fiorentina, Middlesbrough, Leeds United and Vicenza before returning to the country where he made his name with Oostende in 2004. After a brief spell with APOEL in Cyprus, Okon returned to Australia.

He signed with A-League club Newcastle United Jets for the 2006–07 season. Okon fit into a well-constructed Jets side and helped then make the play-offs in 2007. Due to injury concerns, Okon decided to retire from professional football in June 2007. Okon played for amateur team West Ryde Rovers' over-35 Division 1 team in the GHFA.

== Managerial career ==
On 24 June 2008, along with Alex Tobin, Alistair Edwards and Nicola Williams, Okon was a recipient of an inaugural three-year scholarship under the Elite Coaching Development Program led by the FFA. As part of the program, Okon spent time at Coverciano with the Italian U-23 side under Pierluigi Casiraghi in the lead up to the 2008 Olympic Games, and spent a stint studying the youth setup of PSV Eindhoven.

On 2 September 2008, Okon was appointed assistant coach to Miron Bleiberg at Gold Coast United for their inaugural season. Before taking up his new role he took up an interim coaching role at APIA Leichhardt for their 2009 NSW Premier League season.

On 30 October 2008, Okon was appointed to lead the Australian U-18 side at the Australian Youth Olympic Festival in the month of January, aimed as part of a long-term view towards establishing the team for the 2012 Olympic Games.

On 23 February 2010, Okon did not renew his contract with Gold Coast United, following the team's loss in the first round of the A-league finals. Since then, he has gone away on tour with the Australian Olympic under-23 squad for a tournament in Vietnam, where he was assistant coach to Aurelio Vidmar.

On 19 April 2012, it was announced he was appointed head coach of the Australia U20 national team and assistant coach of the Australia Olympic soccer team.

On 29 August 2016, Okon was appointed the new manager of the Central Coast Mariners, signing a two-year contract. Okon replaced Tony Walmsley who was sacked following Central Coast's FFA Cup elimination at the hands of National Premier Leagues Victoria team Green Gully.

In Okon's debut as Central Coast manager, the Mariners drew 3–3 with Perth Glory at Nib Stadium, after coming back from 3-0 down at half time. Okon achieved his first win as Central Coast manager in his fifth game in charge: a 2–1 win over defending champions Adelaide United at Hindmarsh Stadium on 6 November 2016.

On 20 March 2018, with the Mariners being at the bottom of the A-League, it was announced that Okon had resigned from his position as manager of the Central Coast Mariners.

On 30 September 2024, Football Australia announced that Okon would replace René Meulensteen as the assistant manager of the Socceroos.

== Personal life ==
Okon's son, Paul Jr., is also a footballer, and currently plays at 1.FC Koln. Okon went by the nickname "Pistol" throughout his playing career. During his time in Belgium, Okon acquired citizenship of the country.

== Career statistics ==
Appearances and goals by national team and year
National team	Year	Apps	Goals
Australia	1991	1	0
Australia	1992	0	0
Australia	1993	1	0
Australia	1994	1	0
Australia	1995	1	0
Australia	1996	1	0
Australia	1997	0	0
Australia	1998	0	0
Australia	1999	0	0
Australia	2000	11	0
Australia	2001	9	0
Australia	2002	0	0
Australia	2003	3	0
Total		28	0

== Managerial statistics ==
As of 6 May 2018

Team	Nat	From	To	Record				
Team	Nat	From	To	G	W	D	L	Win %
Central Coast Mariners	(Australia)	29 August 2016	20 March 2018	51	10	13	28	19.61
Total				51	10	13	28	19.61

== Honours ==
Club Brugge

- Belgian Supercup: 1991, 1992, 1994
- Belgian Pro League: 1995–96
- Belgian Cup: 1994–95, 1995–96

Lazio

- Coppa Italia: 1997–98
- Supercoppa Italiana: 1998
- UEFA Cup Winners' Cup: 1998–99

APOEL

- Cypriot Cup: 2005–06

Australia

- FIFA Confederations Cup: 3rd place, 2001
- OFC Nations Cup: 2000

Australia U20

- OFC U-20 Championship: 1990

Individual

- NSL Papasavas Medal (U-21): 1989–1990, 1990–1991
- Belgian Golden Shoe: 1995–1996
- Oceania Footballer of the Year: 1996
- The Best Golden Shoe Team (2011)
