= Yevhen Pokhlebayev =

Ukrainian footballer (born 1971)

Personal information
- Full name: Yevhen Vasylyovych Pokhlebayev
- Date of birth: 25 November 1971 (age 54)
- Place of birth: Poltava, Ukrainian SSR
- Height: 1.76 m (5 ft 9 in)
- Position: Midfielder

Senior career*
Years	Team	Apps	(Gls)
1988–1994	Dnipro Dnipropetrovsk	100	(9)
1995–1997	Dynamo Kyiv	57	(11)
1996–1997	→ Dynamo-2 Kyiv	5	(4)
1997	→ Dynamo-3 Kyiv	1	(1)
Total		163	(25)

International career
- USSR U18
1991	USSR youth	6	(1)
1992–1996	Ukraine	14	(0)
1992	Ukraine (unofficial)	1	(1)
Medal record
Men's football
Representing Soviet Union
FIFA World Youth Championship
Bronze medal – third place	1991 Portugal
UEFA European Under-18 Championship
Winner	1990 Hungary
- * Club domestic league appearances and goals

Yevhen Vasylyovych Pokhlebaev (Ukrainian: Євген Васильович Похлебаєв; born 25 November 1971) is a Ukrainian former professional footballer who played as a midfielder.

== Career ==
Pokhlebaev capped six games for USSR youth team at 1991 FIFA World Youth Championship and scored one goal against the youth team of Trinidad and Tobago.

He had to retire in 1997 after complications from acute herpesviral encephalitis caused him to have severe amnesia.

== Honours ==
Dnepr Dnepropetrovsk

- Soviet Top League: 1988
- USSR Federation Cup: 1989

Dynamo Kyiv

- Ukrainian Top League: 1994–95, 1995–96, 1996–97
- Ukrainian Cup: 1995–96

Soviet Union U18

- UEFA European championship: 1990
