= Lorenz Kindtner =

Australian soccer player

Personal information
- Full name: Lorenz Kindtner
- Date of birth: 13 October 1971 (age 55)
- Place of birth: Melbourne, Australia
- Position: Defender

Senior career*
Years	Team	Apps	(Gls)
1989	AIS		
1989–1991	Sunshine George Cross	37	(7)
1991–1994	Club Brugge	0	(0)
1994–1995	SW Harelbeke	?	(?)
1995–1996	Sint-Truidense	15	(0)
1996–1999	Oostende	28	(3)
1999–2000	Cercle Brugge	31	(4)
2000–2003	KSV Roeselare	54	(2)
2004–2008	Western Suburbs SC	113	(12)
2009–	Richmond SC	13	(1)

International career
1990	Australia U-20	2	(0)
1991–1992	Australia U-23	5	(0)
1996	Australia	1	(0)
- * Club domestic league appearances and goals

Lorenz Kindtner (born 13 October 1971) is an Australian soccer player.

== Playing career ==
=== Club career ===
After playing at the AIS and Sunshine George Cross, Kindtner played almost a decade in Belgium, playing for a number of teams including Club Brugge and Cercle Brugge.

In 2009, Kindter played for Richmond SC in the Victorian Premier League.

=== International career ===
Kindtner played one match for Australia against Saudi Arabia in Riyadh in 1996.
