= Armen Babalaryan =

Armenian football midfielder

Personal information
- Date of birth: 15 August 1971 (age 55)
- Place of birth: USSR
- Height: 1.72 m (5 ft 8 in)
- Position: Midfielder

Senior career*
Years	Team	Apps	(Gls)
1988	FC Iskra Yerevan	2	(0)
1989–1991	FC Ararat Yerevan	11	(0)
1991	FC Kotayk	5	(0)
1992	FC Ararat Yerevan	14	(4)

International career
1991	USSR U-20		

Managerial career
- ?: San Fernando Valley Golden Eagles (Assistant)
- * Club domestic league appearances and goals

Armen Babalaryan (Armenian: Արմեն Բաբալարյան; born 15 August 1971) is an Armenian football midfielder.

Between 1989 and 1991, he played for famous Armenian clubs like Ararat Yerevan and Kotayk Abovyan. He was also capped for the USSR U-20 team at the 1991 FIFA World Youth Championship.
