= 1985 FIFA World Youth Championship squads =

FIFA championship roster

Below are the rosters for the 1985 FIFA World Youth Championship tournament in Soviet Union. Those marked in bold went on to earn full international caps.

== Group A ==
=== Bulgaria ===
Head coach: Boris Angelov

No.	Pos.	Player	Date of birth (age)	Caps	Club
1	GK	Lyuben Zhilkov	15 November 1965 (aged 19)		(Bulgaria) Pirin Blagoevgrad
2	DF	Dimitre Kalkanov	5 April 1966 (aged 19)		(Bulgaria) Lokomotiv Plovdiv
3	DF	**Pavel Dochev**	28 September 1965 (aged 19)		(Bulgaria) Lokomotiv Sofia
4	DF	**Dimitar Vasev**	10 September 1965 (aged 19)		(Bulgaria) Lokomotiv Sofia
5	DF	Rosen Pachov	11 March 1966 (aged 19)		(Bulgaria) Pirin Blagoevgrad
6	MF	Aleksandar Ivanov	25 September 1967 (aged 17)		(Bulgaria) PFC Shumen
7	FW	**Emil Kostadinov**	12 August 1967 (aged 18)		(Bulgaria) Sredetz Sofia
8	MF	**Ivaylo Kirov**	30 December 1966 (aged 18)		(Bulgaria) Sredetz Sofia
9	FW	**Petar Mihtarski**	15 August 1966 (aged 19)		(Bulgaria) Pirin Blagoevgrad
10	MF	**Krasimir Balakov**	29 March 1966 (aged 19)		(Bulgaria) Etar Veliko Tarnovo
11	FW	Aleksandar Bonchev	30 November 1965 (aged 19)		(Bulgaria) Lokomotiv Sofia
12	GK	Rumen Dankov	20 November 1965 (aged 19)		(Bulgaria) Etar Veliko Tarnovo
13	DF	Yulian Garev	9 April 1967 (aged 18)		(Bulgaria) Spartak Pleven
14	MF	**Lyuboslav Penev**	31 August 1966 (aged 18)		(Bulgaria) Sredetz Sofia
15	MF	Radko Kalaydzhiev	28 September 1967 (aged 17)		(Bulgaria) Beroe Stara Zagora
16	MF	Plamen Petkov	17 October 1967 (aged 17)		(Bulgaria) Lokomotiv Ruse
17	MF	**Zlatko Yankov**	27 August 1966 (aged 18)		(Bulgaria) Neftochimic Burgas
18	FW	Dimitar Krastev	16 February 1966 (aged 19)		(Bulgaria) Akademik Sofia

=== Colombia ===
Head coach: Luis Marroquín

No.	Pos.	Player	Date of birth (age)	Caps	Club
1	GK	**René Higuita**	27 August 1966 (aged 18)		(Colombia) Atlético Nacional
2	FW	Carlos Mesa	25 May 1966 (aged 19)		(Colombia) Liga de Nariño
3	DF	Álvaro Nuñez	9 June 1967 (aged 18)		(Colombia) Independiente Santa Fe
4	DF	John Álvarez	11 November 1965 (aged 19)		(Colombia) Atlético Nacional
5	DF	**Jairo Ampudia**	14 February 1966 (aged 19)		(Colombia) América de Cali
6	MF	José Hurtado	21 February 1966 (aged 19)		(Colombia) América de Cali
7	FW	**John Jairo Tréllez**	29 April 1968 (aged 17)		(Colombia) Atlético Nacional
8	MF	**Orlando Maturana**	11 October 1966 (aged 18)		(Colombia) Atlético Bucaramanga
9	FW	**Wilmer Cabrera**	15 September 1967 (aged 17)		(Colombia) Independiente Santa Fe
10	MF	Carlos Álvarez	6 October 1965 (aged 19)		(Colombia) Atlético Nacional
11	DF	Diego Láinez	7 September 1965 (aged 19)		(Colombia) Deportes Tolima
12	GK	**Eduardo Niño**	8 August 1967 (aged 18)		(Colombia) Independiente Santa Fe
13	DF	John Jairo Córdoba	22 October 1965 (aged 19)		(Colombia) Unión Magdalena
14	FW	Felipe Pérez	24 January 1967 (aged 18)		(Colombia) Atlético Nacional
15	FW	Rafael Álvarez	17 July 1966 (aged 19)		(Colombia) Liga de Bolívar
16	MF	Hugo Caicedo	22 July 1967 (aged 18)		(Colombia) Deportivo Cali
17	FW	John Castaño	12 May 1966 (aged 19)		(Colombia) América de Cali
18	MF	Wilson Rodríguez	16 August 1965 (aged 20)		(Colombia) Deportes Tolima

=== Hungary ===
Head coach: Bertalan Bicskei

No.	Pos.	Player	Date of birth (age)	Caps	Club
1	GK	**Zsolt Petry**	23 September 1966 (aged 18)		(Hungary) MTK
2	DF	**József Szalma**	22 August 1966 (aged 19)		(Hungary) Tatabánya
3	DF	**Attila Pintér**	7 May 1966 (aged 19)		(Hungary) Ferencváros
4	DF	**József Keller**	25 September 1965 (aged 19)		(Hungary) Ferencváros
5	DF	László Szélpál	20 August 1965 (aged 20)		(Hungary) SZEOL
6	MF	**Ervin Kovács**	24 January 1967 (aged 18)		(Hungary) Újpesti Dózsa
7	FW	**János Zsinka**	2 October 1965 (aged 19)		(Hungary) Ferencváros
8	MF	Sándor Deák	11 September 1965 (aged 19)		(Hungary) Ferencváros
9	FW	**Kálmán Kovács**	11 September 1965 (aged 19)		(Hungary) Honvéd
10	MF	**István Vincze**	22 January 1967 (aged 18)		(Hungary) Tatabánya
11	FW	**Pál Fischer**	29 January 1967 (aged 18)		(Hungary) Ferencváros
12	MF	Ferenc Haáz	12 February 1966 (aged 19)		(Hungary) Ferencváros
13	MF	Róbert Csoboth	7 October 1965 (aged 19)		(Hungary) Pécs
14	MF	Attila Horváth	2 May 1967 (aged 18)		(Hungary) MTK
15	FW	Gyula Zsivóczky	21 April 1966 (aged 19)		(Hungary) Ferencváros
16	FW	**József Zvara**	17 August 1966 (aged 19)		(Hungary) Ferencváros
17	FW	György Orovecz	2 October 1967 (aged 17)		(Hungary) MTK
18	GK	Sándor Lanczkor	16 March 1966 (aged 19)		(Hungary) Ferencváros

=== Tunisia ===
Head coach: Mrad Mahjoub

No.	Pos.	Player	Date of birth (age)	Caps	Club
1	GK	**Chokri El Ouaer**	15 August 1966 (aged 19)		(Tunisia) Étoile Sahel
2	DF	Taoufik Mhadhbi	19 December 1965 (aged 19)		(Tunisia) AS Mégrine
3	DF	Lotfi Chihi	14 May 1966 (aged 19)		(Tunisia) Olympique Transports
4	DF	**Mohamed Mahjoubi**	28 September 1966 (aged 18)		(Tunisia) AS Marsa
5	DF	Mohamed Abdelhak	7 March 1966 (aged 19)		(Tunisia) Club Africain
6	MF	Mourad Gharbi	25 January 1966 (aged 19)		(Tunisia) CA Bizertin
7	FW	Mohamed Dergaa	16 January 1966 (aged 19)		(Tunisia) CS Sfaxien
8	MF	Lotfi Ounis	21 October 1965 (aged 19)		(Tunisia) SR Sports
9	FW	**Kaïs Yacoubi**	18 August 1966 (aged 19)		(Tunisia) Club Africain
10	MF	**Haithem Abid**	22 September 1965 (aged 19)		(Tunisia) Étoile Sahel
11	FW	**Lotfi Rouissi**	13 November 1965 (aged 19)		(Tunisia) Club Africain
12	MF	Mounir El Bez	5 January 1966 (aged 19)		(Tunisia) CA Bizertin
13	FW	Sami Touati	29 August 1965 (aged 19)		(Tunisia) Club Africain
14	FW	**Jameleddine Limam**	11 June 1967 (aged 18)		(Tunisia) Stade Tunisien
15	MF	Hicham Grioui	19 December 1965 (aged 19)		(Tunisia) Club Africain
16	DF	Mohamed Dagdoug	9 July 1966 (aged 19)		(Tunisia) CS Sfaxien
17	MF	Tarak Haouari	25 March 1966 (aged 19)		(Tunisia) AS Gabès
18	GK	Ahmed Bourchada	22 September 1966 (aged 18)		(Tunisia) CA Bizertin

== Group B ==
=== Brazil ===
Head coach: Gilson Nunes

No.	Pos.	Player	Date of birth (age)	Caps	Club
1	GK	**Cláudio Taffarel**	8 May 1966 (aged 19)		(Brazil) Internacional
2	DF	Luciano	13 October 1965 (aged 19)		(Brazil) Portuguesa (SP)
3	DF	Luis Carlos	12 April 1966 (aged 19)		(Brazil) Grêmio
4	DF	Henrique	15 March 1966 (aged 19)		(Brazil) Grêmio
5	MF	João Antonio	14 June 1966 (aged 19)		(Brazil) Grêmio
6	DF	Dida	26 October 1965 (aged 19)		(Brazil) Coritiba
7	MF	**Silas**	27 August 1965 (aged 19)		(Brazil) São Paulo
8	MF	Tosin	16 April 1966 (aged 19)		(Brazil) Guarani
9	FW	Gérson	23 September 1965 (aged 19)		(Brazil) Guarani
10	FW	**Müller**	31 January 1966 (aged 19)		(Brazil) São Paulo
11	MF	Antonio Carlos	21 December 1965 (aged 19)		(Brazil) Vitória
12	GK	Chico	20 January 1967 (aged 18)		(Brazil) Grêmio
13	DF	Polaco	4 January 1966 (aged 19)		(Brazil) América (SP)
14	DF	Stinico	20 September 1967 (aged 17)		(Brazil) Ponte Preta
15	MF	Marçal	20 December 1965 (aged 19)		(Brazil) Atlético Goianiense
16	FW	Izael	20 September 1965 (aged 19)		(Brazil) América (SP)
17	FW	Binho	24 March 1966 (aged 19)		(Brazil) Grêmio
18	FW	Balalo	17 August 1965 (aged 20)		(Brazil) Internacional

=== Republic of Ireland ===
Head coach: Liam Tuohy

No.	Pos.	Player	Date of birth (age)	Caps	Club
1	GK	James Myers	4 December 1967 (aged 17)		(Republic of Ireland) St Joseph's
2	DF	Pat O'Kelly	31 July 1967 (aged 18)		(Republic of Ireland) Home Farm
3	DF	Pat Kelch	5 May 1966 (aged 19)		(England) Manchester United
4	DF	Tim O'Shea	12 November 1966 (aged 18)		(England) Tottenham Hotspur
5	DF	Pat Dolan	20 September 1967 (aged 17)		(England) Arsenal
6	DF	Noel Bollard	26 August 1965 (aged 19)		(Republic of Ireland) Home Farm
7	DF	Seamus Purcell	10 September 1965 (aged 19)		(Republic of Ireland) Shamrock Rovers
8	MF	Martin Bayly	14 June 1966 (aged 19)		(England) Wolverhampton Wanderers
9	MF	Derek Murray	29 November 1965 (aged 19)		(Republic of Ireland) Home Farm
10	MF	Eamonn Collins	22 October 1965 (aged 19)		(England) Southampton
11	MF	Martin Russell	27 April 1967 (aged 18)		(England) Manchester United
12	MF	Marcus Tuite	11 May 1968 (aged 17)		(England) Luton Town
13	MF	Derek Swan	24 October 1966 (aged 18)		(Republic of Ireland) Home Farm
14	FW	Brian Mooney	2 February 1966 (aged 19)		(England) Liverpool
15	FW	John Neal	11 March 1966 (aged 19)		(England) Millwall
16	GK	Paul Kelly	6 November 1966 (aged 18)		(Republic of Ireland) Home Farm
17	FW	Eamonn Dolan	20 September 1967 (aged 17)		(England) West Ham United
18	FW	Tom McDermott	26 September 1966 (aged 18)		(England) Leeds United

=== Saudi Arabia ===
Head coach: (Brazil) Oswaldo Sempaio

No.	Pos.	Player	Date of birth (age)	Caps	Club
1	GK	Samir Al-Solaimani	11 August 1966 (aged 19)		(Saudi Arabia) Al-Ahli
2	MF	Abdulaziz Al-Razgan	6 December 1969 (aged 15)		(Saudi Arabia) Al-Shebab
3	DF	Esam Al-Saud	15 September 1966 (aged 18)		(Saudi Arabia) Al-Shebab
4	DF	**Abdulrahman Al-Roomi**	28 October 1969 (aged 15)		(Saudi Arabia) Al-Shebab
5	DF	Bassim Abu-Dawod	7 November 1965 (aged 19)		(Saudi Arabia) Al-Ahli
6	MF	Saleh Al-Saleh	3 January 1966 (aged 19)		(Saudi Arabia) Al-Nasr
7	FW	**Musaed Ibrahim**	18 November 1965 (aged 19)		(Saudi Arabia) Al-Shebab
8	MF	**Fahad Al-Bishi**	10 September 1965 (aged 19)		(Saudi Arabia) Al-Nasr
9	FW	Hathal Al-Dosari	29 September 1966 (aged 18)		(Saudi Arabia) Al-Hilal
10	DF	Khaled Al-Muhaizee	2 September 1966 (aged 18)		(Saudi Arabia) Al-Nahda
11	FW	**Mohaisen Al-Jam'an**	6 April 1966 (aged 19)		(Saudi Arabia) Al-Nasr
12	MF	Faisal Al-Mowaled	2 October 1966 (aged 18)		(Saudi Arabia) Al-Ahli
13	DF	Mohammed Al-Maglouth	15 September 1965 (aged 19)		(Saudi Arabia) Al-Ettifaq
14	DF	Saad Al-Zafer	12 September 1967 (aged 17)		(Saudi Arabia) Al-Hilal
15	GK	Ismail Hakami	6 August 1966 (aged 19)		(Saudi Arabia) Al-Ittihad
16	DF	Hassan Al-Habashi	9 November 1965 (aged 19)		(Saudi Arabia) Al-Hilal
17	MF	Bandar Al-Nakhli	25 October 1965 (aged 19)		(Saudi Arabia) Ohod
18	GK	Khaled Al-Daiyel	8 November 1966 (aged 18)		(Saudi Arabia) Al-Hilal

=== Spain ===
Head coach: Jesús Pereda

No.	Pos.	Player	Date of birth (age)	Caps	Club
1	GK	Juan Carlos Unzué	22 April 1967 (aged 18)		(Spain) Osasuna
2	DF	Marcelino García	14 August 1965 (aged 20)		(Spain) Sporting de Gijón
3	DF	César Mendiondo	25 June 1966 (aged 19)		(Spain) Atlético Madrid
4	DF	**Rafael Paz**	2 August 1965 (aged 20)		(Spain) Sevilla
5	DF	Pedro Arozarena	24 February 1966 (aged 19)		(Spain) Osasuna
6	DF	José Tirado	4 November 1965 (aged 19)		(Spain) Sevilla
7	DF	**Patxi Ferreira**	22 May 1967 (aged 18)		(Spain) Athletic Bilbao
8	MF	Iñigo Lizarralde	14 June 1966 (aged 19)		(Spain) Athletic Bilbao
9	MF	José Aurelio Gay	10 December 1965 (aged 19)		(Spain) Real Madrid
10	MF	**Fernando Gómez**	11 September 1965 (aged 19)		(Spain) Valencia
11	MF	Nayim	5 November 1966 (aged 18)		(Spain) Barcelona
12	MF	Juanma Sánchez	4 November 1966 (aged 18)		(Spain) Málaga
13	GK	**Julen Lopetegui**	28 August 1966 (aged 18)		(Spain) Real Sociedad
14	FW	**Jon Andoni Goikoetxea**	21 October 1965 (aged 19)		(Spain) Osasuna
15	FW	Manuel Peña	18 December 1965 (aged 19)		(Spain) Real Valladolid
16	MF	Jose Michel Fajardo	29 April 1968 (aged 17)		(Spain) Real Betis Balompie
17	FW	**Sebastián Losada**	3 September 1967 (aged 17)		(Spain) Real Madrid
18	FW	Francis Cabral	3 November 1965 (aged 19)		(Spain) Cádiz

== Group C ==
=== Australia ===
Head coach: (England) Jim Shoulder

No.	Pos.	Player	Date of birth (age)	Caps	Club
1	GK	Paul Jones	1 January 1967 (aged 18)		(Australia) Australian Institute of Sport
2	DF	**Robert Hooker**	6 March 1967 (aged 18)		(Australia) Australian Institute of Sport
3	DF	John Gregson	23 August 1965 (aged 20)		(Australia) Melita Eagles
4	DF	Mark Jones	5 June 1966 (aged 19)		(Australia) Newcastle Rosebud
5	DF	Loucas Kotzamichalis	12 May 1966 (aged 19)		(Australia) Melbourne Croatia
6	MF	**Andrew Koczka**	9 September 1965 (aged 19)		(Australia) St George
7	FW	Alex Bundalo	18 May 1966 (aged 19)		(Australia) Wollongong City
8	MF	John Panagis	28 March 1966 (aged 19)		(Australia) West Adelaide
9	FW	Peter Petrovski	25 September 1966 (aged 18)		(Australia) St George
10	MF	Lou Hristodolou	7 August 1967 (aged 18)		(Australia) Australian Institute of Sport
11	MF	**Chris Kalantzis**	22 July 1967 (aged 18)		(Australia) Sydney Olympic
12	DF	Michael McLennan	13 April 1967 (aged 18)		(Australia) Australian Institute of Sport
13	FW	Sean Ingham	13 August 1965 (aged 20)		(Australia) Australian Institute of Sport
14	FW	**Warren Spink**	4 October 1966 (aged 18)		(Australia) Preston Makedonia
15	MF	Richard Bassingthwaite	18 August 1965 (aged 20)		(Australia) Brisbane Lions
16	MF	David Sharpe	29 June 1966 (aged 19)		(Australia) Australian Institute of Sport
17	DF	**Ange Postecoglou**	27 August 1965 (aged 19)		(Australia) South Melbourne
18	GK	Mirko Runje	14 October 1966 (aged 18)		(Australia) Melbourne Croatia

=== Canada ===
Head coach: (England) Bob Bearpark

No.	Pos.	Player	Date of birth (age)	Caps	Club
1	GK	**Bryan Rosenfeld**	8 May 1966 (aged 19)		(Canada) Thunder Bay
2	DF	Lino Tomasetti	3 June 1966 (aged 19)		(Canada) Hamilton
3	DF	**Peter Gilfillan**	29 December 1965 (aged 19)		(Canada) Ontario U-18
4	DF	**Jeff Cambridge**	22 November 1966 (aged 18)		(Canada) Ontario U-18
5	DF	John DiPasquale	13 January 1966 (aged 19)		(Canada) Ontario U-18
6	MF	**Peter Sloly**	5 August 1966 (aged 19)		(Canada) Ontario U-18
7	MF	**Lucio Ianiero**	13 December 1966 (aged 18)		(Canada) Ontario U-18
8	MF	Pierre-Richard Thomas	20 March 1966 (aged 19)		(Canada) Montreal
9	FW	**Alex Bunbury**	18 June 1967 (aged 18)		(Canada) Quebec U-18
10	MF	**Pat Cubellis**	7 February 1967 (aged 18)		(Canada) Ontario U-18
11	MF	Ramy Rajballie	9 April 1967 (aged 18)		(Canada) St Andrews
12	MF	Franz Simon	29 September 1965 (aged 19)		(Canada) Ontario U-18
13	FW	**Doug McNaught**	6 July 1967 (aged 18)		(Canada) Ontario U-18
14	MF	**David Phillips**	25 May 1966 (aged 19)		(Canada) Alberta U-18
15	FW	Larry Pretto	4 April 1966 (aged 19)		(Canada) Ontario U-18
16	DF	Brian Bullen	6 June 1966 (aged 19)		(Canada) Ontario U-18
17	MF	**Gregor Young**	8 February 1966 (aged 19)		(Canada) British Columbia U-18
18	GK	Larry Hoole	22 January 1966 (aged 19)		(Canada) Ontario U-18

- Player 18 is also called Larry or Harry Houle in some sources.

=== Nigeria ===
Head coach: (Nigeria) Paul Hamilton

No.	Pos.	Player	Date of birth (age)	Caps	Club
1	GK	**Alloy Agu**	12 July 1967 (aged 18)		(Nigeria) NEPA Lagos
2	DF	Godwin Eveh	1 June 1968 (aged 17)		(Nigeria) First Bank
3	DF	Kingsley Onye	5 August 1966 (aged 19)		(Nigeria) Enugu Rangers
4	DF	**Waidi Akanni**	3 April 1969 (aged 16)		(Nigeria) NEPA Lagos
5	DF	**Andrew Uwe**	12 October 1967 (aged 17)		(Nigeria) Leventis United
6	MF	Michael Odu	24 February 1966 (aged 19)		(Nigeria) Flash Flamingoes
7	FW	Michael Dominic	12 September 1969 (aged 15)		(Nigeria) First Bank
8	MF	Augustine Igbinabaro	7 August 1967 (aged 18)		New Nigeria Bank
9	FW	Monday Odiaka	12 October 1966 (aged 18)		(Nigeria) ACB Lagos
10	MF	Obabaifo Osaro	1 August 1966 (aged 19)		(Nigeria) Flash Flamingoes
11	FW	Mark Anunobi	12 October 1967 (aged 17)		(Nigeria) NNPC
12	FW	**Ndubuisi Okosieme**	28 September 1966 (aged 18)		(Nigeria) Julius Berger
13	MF	**Samson Siasia**	14 August 1967 (aged 18)		(Nigeria) Flash Flamingoes
14	DF	Titus Mba	5 May 1968 (aged 17)		(Nigeria) Flash Flamingoes
15	MF	Niyi Adeleye	19 October 1966 (aged 18)		(Nigeria) Julius Berger
16	MF	Wasiu Ipaye	6 July 1968 (aged 17)		(Nigeria) First Bank
17	GK	**Christian Obi**	2 January 1967 (aged 18)		(Nigeria) Julius Berger
18	GK	Uche Ikeogu	28 December 1967 (aged 17)		(Nigeria) Standards Jos

=== Soviet Union ===
Head coach: Sergei Mosyagin

No.	Pos.	Player	Date of birth (age)	Caps	Club
1	GK	**Igor Kutepov**	17 December 1967 (aged 17)		(Soviet Union) Metallist Kharkov
2	DF	**Gela Ketashvili**	27 September 1965 (aged 19)		(Soviet Union) Dynamo Tbilisi
3	DF	**Vladimir Gorilyi**	11 October 1965 (aged 19)		(Soviet Union) Dynamo Kiev
4	DF	**Soso Chedia**	9 October 1965 (aged 19)		(Soviet Union) Dynamo Tbilisi
5	DF	**Sergey Kolotovkin**	28 September 1965 (aged 19)		(Soviet Union) Zenit Leningrad
6	MF	**Valdas Ivanauskas**	31 July 1966 (aged 19)		(Soviet Union) CSKA Moscow
7	MF	Sergei Khudozhilov	6 September 1965 (aged 19)		(Soviet Union) Dnepr Dnepropetrovsk
8	MF	Vyacheslav Medvid	28 August 1965 (aged 19)		(Soviet Union) CSKA Moscow
9	FW	Sergei Savchenko	10 August 1966 (aged 19)		(Soviet Union) CSKA Moscow
10	MF	**Vladimir Tatarchuk**	25 April 1966 (aged 19)		(Soviet Union) CSKA Moscow
11	FW	**Igor Sklyarov**	31 August 1966 (aged 18)		(Soviet Union) SKA Rostov on Don
12	DF	**Andrey Mokh**	20 October 1966 (aged 18)		(Soviet Union) CSKA Moscow
13	FW	Oleg Kuzhlev	12 August 1966 (aged 19)		(Soviet Union) Spartak Moscow
14	MF	Oleg Serdyuk	22 August 1966 (aged 19)		(Soviet Union) Iskra Smolensk
15	FW	Rolandas Bubliauskas	10 September 1966 (aged 18)		(Soviet Union) Zalgiris Vilnius
16	GK	**Andrei Manannikov**	5 August 1965 (aged 20)		(Soviet Union) Pamir Dushanbe
17	MF	**Armands Zeiberliņš**	13 August 1965 (aged 20)		(Soviet Union) SKA Rostov on Don
18	MF	Aleksandr Yesipov	14 September 1965 (aged 19)		(Soviet Union) Metallist Kharkov

== Group D ==
=== China ===
Head coach: Zhang Zhicheng

No.	Pos.	Player	Date of birth (age)	Caps	Club
1	GK	Xu Tao	9 August 1965 (aged 20)		(China) Liaoning
2	DF	Dong Yugang	4 October 1965 (aged 19)		(China) Beijing
3	FW	Zhao Xudong	24 November 1965 (aged 19)		(China) Beijing
4	DF	Yang Feipeng	4 August 1966 (aged 19)		(China) Yunnan
5	DF	Li Hongbing	10 August 1965 (aged 20)		(China) Jiangsu
6	DF	Ju Lijin	31 January 1966 (aged 19)		(China) Shanghai
7	MF	Pang Zhijian	14 November 1965 (aged 19)		(China) Guangxi
8	MF	Gong Lei	15 October 1965 (aged 19)		(China) Beijing
9	FW	**Gao Hongbo**	21 January 1966 (aged 19)		(China) Beijing
10	FW	**Zhang Yan**	3 October 1966 (aged 18)		(China) Beijing
11	MF	You Kewei	12 November 1965 (aged 19)		(China) Shenyang
12	GK	Lun Zhiming	4 October 1965 (aged 19)		(China) Guangzhou
13	GK	Li Jiandong	20 August 1965 (aged 20)		(China) Beijing
14	MF	Fu Bo	20 September 1965 (aged 19)		(China) Liaoning
15	FW	**Li Hui**	8 September 1965 (aged 19)		(China) Liaoning
16	DF	Yang Weijian	2 September 1965 (aged 19)		(China) Shandong
17	FW	**Song Lianyong**	8 October 1965 (aged 19)		(China) Tianjin
18	MF	**Gao Zhongxun**	4 October 1965 (aged 19)		(China) Jilin

=== England ===
Head coach: Dave Sexton

No.	Pos.	Player	Date of birth (age)	Caps	Club
2	DF	Terry Howard	26 February 1966 (aged 19)		(England) Crystal Palace
3	DF	**Michael Thomas**	24 August 1967 (aged 18)		(England) Arsenal
4	MF	Gary Stebbing	11 August 1965 (aged 20)		(England) Crystal Palace
5	MF	John Beresford	4 September 1966 (aged 18)		(England) Manchester City
6	DF	David Corner	15 May 1966 (aged 19)		(England) Sunderland
7	FW	Richard Cooke	4 September 1965 (aged 19)		(England) Tottenham Hotspur
8	FW	Paul Moulden	6 September 1967 (aged 17)		(England) Manchester City
9	FW	Robbie Wakenshaw	22 December 1965 (aged 19)		(England) Everton
10	MF	Stephen Scott	8 May 1965 (aged 20)		(England) Queens Park Rangers
12	FW	Nicky Wood	11 January 1966 (aged 19)		(England) Manchester United
13	GK	Derick Williams	5 October 1965 (aged 19)		(England) Reading
14	MF	Franz Carr	24 September 1966 (aged 18)		(England) Nottingham Forest
15	FW	Mark Stein	29 January 1966 (aged 19)		(England) Luton Town
16	GK	Darren Heyes	11 January 1967 (aged 18)		(England) Nottingham Forest
17	MF	Philip Priest	9 September 1966 (aged 18)		(England) Chelsea
18	DF	Simon Ratcliffe	8 February 1967 (aged 18)		(England) Manchester United

- Only 16 players in England squad. Goalkeeper (N°1) **Tim Flowers** 03/02/1967 Wolverhampton Wanderers F.C. England and forward (N°11) Ian Marshall 20/03/1966 Everton F.C. England were cut from the final squad and not replaced.

=== Mexico ===
Head coach: Jesús del Muro

No.	Pos.	Player	Date of birth (age)	Caps	Club
1	GK	**Alejandro García**	26 February 1961 (aged 24)		(Mexico) Toros Neza
2	DF	Teodoro Orozco	22 October 1963 (aged 21)		(Mexico) Irapuato
3	DF	Ángel Torres	1 October 1965 (aged 19)		(Mexico) Guadalajara
4	DF	José Salatiel	23 July 1967 (aged 18)		(Mexico) Atlético Potosino
5	DF	Guillermo Huerta	4 September 1967 (aged 17)		(Mexico) América
6	FW	Víctor Medina	9 October 1964 (aged 20)		(Mexico) Atlético Potosino
7	MF	Guillermo Vázquez	25 May 1967 (aged 18)		(Mexico) UNAM
8	MF	**José de la Torre**	13 November 1965 (aged 19)		(Mexico) Guadalajara
9	MF	**Alberto García Aspe**	11 May 1967 (aged 18)		(Mexico) UNAM
10	FW	**Francisco Javier Cruz**	24 May 1966 (aged 19)		(Mexico) Monterrey
11	FW	**Juan Francisco Uribe Ronquillo**	11 January 1964 (aged 21)		(Mexico) Pumas Enep
12	GK	Héctor Quintero	6 August 1964 (aged 21)		(Mexico) Tecos UAG
13	DF	Ignacio Herrera	10 October 1967 (aged 17)		(Mexico) Cruz Azul
14	MF	Alejandro Frías	24 December 1967 (aged 17)		(Mexico) Puebla
15	MF	Héctor Almazan	8 December 1965 (aged 19)		(Mexico) Tecos UAG
16	MF	**Ignacio Ambríz**	7 February 1965 (aged 20)		(Mexico) Necaxa
17	FW	**David Patiño**	6 September 1967 (aged 17)		(Mexico) Pumas Enep
18	FW	**Héctor Becerra**	10 May 1965 (aged 20)		(Mexico) Monterrey

=== Paraguay ===
Head coach: Salvador Breglia

No.	Pos.	Player	Date of birth (age)	Caps	Club
1	GK	Balbino Balbuena	31 March 1966 (aged 19)		(Paraguay) Cerro Porteño
2	DF	**Virginio Cáceres**	21 May 1966 (aged 19)		(Paraguay) Guaraní
3	DF	Isidoro Aquino	4 April 1966 (aged 19)		(Paraguay) Sportivo Luqueño
4	DF	Pelagio Sánchez	8 October 1965 (aged 19)		(Paraguay) Sol de América
5	DF	Fulgencio Díaz	16 January 1966 (aged 19)		(Paraguay) Libertad
6	MF	Julio César Franco	1 October 1965 (aged 19)		(Paraguay) Guaraní
7	FW	Eumelio Palacios	15 September 1965 (aged 19)		(Paraguay) Libertad
8	MF	Adolfo Jara Heyn	29 December 1965 (aged 19)		(Paraguay) Olimpia
9	FW	Amancio Mereles	10 February 1966 (aged 19)		(Paraguay) River Plate
10	MF	José Paniagua	24 August 1965 (aged 20)		(Paraguay) Nacional
11	FW	Jorge Cartaman	20 August 1965 (aged 20)		(Paraguay) Sol de América
12	GK	Ubaldo González	16 May 1966 (aged 19)		(Paraguay) Sportivo Luqueño
13	DF	César Castro	24 April 1966 (aged 19)		(Paraguay) Olimpia
14	DF	Marcelino Antero	3 January 1966 (aged 19)		(Paraguay) Sol de América
15	MF	Adolfo Vera	27 September 1965 (aged 19)		(Paraguay) Sportivo Luqueño
16	MF	Desiderio Díaz	19 September 1965 (aged 19)		(Paraguay) Libertad
17	FW	Luis Jara	29 December 1965 (aged 19)		(Paraguay) Olimpia
18	MF	Carlos Galeano	15 August 1965 (aged 20)		(Paraguay) Libertad
