= 1984 UEFA European Under-18 Championship squads =

Player listings in youth football competition

Players in bold have later been capped at full international level.

== Group A ==
=== Greece ===
Head coach:

=== Portugal ===
Head coach: José Augusto

No.	Pos.	Player	Date of birth (age)	Caps	Goals	Club
	GK	Sérgio Louro	3 January 1966 (aged 18)			(Portuguese Football Federation) Sporting
	GK	Paulo Renato	31 May 1966 (aged 17)			(Portuguese Football Federation) Benfica
	DF	**Fernando Mendes**	5 November 1966 (aged 17)			(Portuguese Football Federation) Sporting
	DF	Carlos Carvalhal	4 December 1965 (aged 18)			(Portuguese Football Federation) Braga
	DF	Jorge Paixão	19 December 1965 (aged 18)			(Portuguese Football Federation) Amora
	DF	Carlos Manuel	13 February 1966 (aged 18)			(Portuguese Football Federation) Vitória de Setúbal
	DF	Caetano	5 July 1966 (aged 17)			(Portuguese Football Federation) Boavista
	DF	Germano Santos	27 November 1965 (aged 18)			(Portuguese Football Federation) Sporting
	DF	Luís Ferrinho	13 March 1966 (aged 18)			(Portuguese Football Federation) Sporting
	DF	Rui Eugénio	21 July 1966 (aged 17)			(Portuguese Football Federation) Sporting
	MF	Júlio Sérgio	14 August 1965 (aged 18)			(Portuguese Football Federation) FC Porto
	MF	Mito	26 September 1965 (aged 18)			(Portuguese Football Federation) FC Porto
	MF	**Samuel Quina**	3 August 1966 (aged 17)			(Portuguese Football Federation) Benfica
	MF	**Jorge Ferreira**	18 March 1966 (aged 18)			(Portuguese Football Federation) Barreirense
	MF	**Litos**	6 January 1967 (aged 17)			(Portuguese Football Federation) Sporting
	FW	**Paulo Futre**	28 February 1966 (aged 18)			(Portuguese Football Federation) Sporting
	FW	Seca	24 September 1965 (aged 18)			(Portuguese Football Federation) Torralta

=== Republic of Ireland ===
Head coach: Liam Touhy

=== Scotland ===
Head coach:

== Group B ==
=== Bulgaria ===
Head coach:

=== Denmark ===
Head coach:

=== Italy ===
Head coach:

=== Poland ===
Head coach: (Poland) Henryk Apostel

No.	Pos.	Player	Date of birth (age)	Caps	Goals	Club
	GK	Mirosław Dreszer	28 August 1965 (aged 18)			(Polish Football Association) GKS Tychy
	GK	Marek Grzywacz	24 December 1965 (aged 18)			(Polish Football Association) Górnik Wałbrzych
	GK	Grzegorz Maśnik	8 December 1967 (aged 16)			(Polish Football Association) Stal Stocznia Szczecin
	DF	Paweł Dylewski	22 December 1965 (aged 18)			(Polish Football Association) Wisła Płock
	DF	**Jacek Duchowski**	2 January 1966 (aged 18)			(Polish Football Association) Pogoń Szczecin
	DF	Jarosław Giszka	6 August 1965 (aged 18)			(Polish Football Association) Gryf Słupsk
	DF	Jacek Mróz	20 March 1966 (aged 18)			(Polish Football Association) Raków Częstochowa
	DF	Piotr Haśko	21 June 1966 (aged 17)			(Polish Football Association) Pafawag Wrocław
	DF	Dionizy Nowak	23 July 1966 (aged 17)			(Polish Football Association) Śląsk Wrocław
	MF	Mirosław Jaworski	15 September 1965 (aged 18)			(Polish Football Association) Ruch Chorzów
	MF	**Andrzej Rudy**	15 October 1965 (aged 18)			(Polish Football Association) Śląsk Wrocław
	MF	Dariusz Wójtowicz	23 August 1965 (aged 18)			(Polish Football Association) Lechia Gdańsk
	MF	Mariusz Kuras	21 August 1965 (aged 18)			(Polish Football Association) Pogoń Szczecin
	MF	**Dariusz Skrzypczak**	13 November 1966 (aged 17)			(Polish Football Association) Lech Poznań
	FW	**Tomasz Cebula**	31 March 1966 (aged 18)			(Polish Football Association) Legia Warszawa
	FW	**Dariusz Marciniak**	30 November 1966 (aged 17)			(Polish Football Association) Widzew Łódź
	FW	**Jacek Ziober**	18 November 1965 (aged 18)			(Polish Football Association) ŁKS Łódź
	FW	**Roman Kosecki**	15 February 1966 (aged 18)			(Polish Football Association) Ursus Warszawa
	FW	Andrzej Golecki	19 August 1965 (aged 18)			(Polish Football Association) Arka Gdynia
	FW	**Marek Świerczewski**	1 March 1967 (aged 17)			(Polish Football Association) Wisła Kraków

== Group C ==
=== East Germany ===
Head coach:

No.	Pos.	Player	Date of birth (age)	Caps	Goals	Club
	GK	Detlev Hartmann	16 August 1965 (aged 18)	1	0	(Deutscher Fußball-Verband der DDR) FC Vorwärts Frankfurt
	GK	Marco Kostmann	12 April 1966 (aged 18)	3	0	(Deutscher Fußball-Verband der DDR) BFC Dynamo
	DF	Udo Fankhänel	30 November 1965 (aged 18)	3	0	(Deutscher Fußball-Verband der DDR) FC Karl-Marx-Stadt
	DF	Uwe Lüdtke	18 November 1965 (aged 18)	3	0	(Deutscher Fußball-Verband der DDR) 1. FC Lokomotive Leipzig
	DF	Frank Mappes	14 April 1966 (aged 18)	3	0	(Deutscher Fußball-Verband der DDR) 1. FC Lokomotive Leipzig
	DF	Roland Szepanski	16 May 1966 (aged 18)	1	1	(Deutscher Fußball-Verband der DDR) FC Carl Zeiss Jena
	DF	Thorsten Wude	19 November 1965 (aged 18)	3	0	(Deutscher Fußball-Verband der DDR) Dynamo Dresden
	MF	**Heiko Bonan**	10 February 1966 (aged 18)	3	0	(Deutscher Fußball-Verband der DDR) 1. FC Magdeburg
	MF	Holger Fandrich	6 September 1965 (aged 18)	1	0	(Deutscher Fußball-Verband der DDR) BFC Dynamo
	MF	**Matthias Lindner**	5 October 1965 (aged 18)	3	2	(Deutscher Fußball-Verband der DDR) 1. FC Lokomotive Leipzig
	MF	**Andreas Thom**	7 September 1965 (aged 18)	3	0	(Deutscher Fußball-Verband der DDR) BFC Dynamo
	MF	Lutz Wienhold	15 September 1966 (aged 17)	3	0	(Deutscher Fußball-Verband der DDR) FC Karl-Marx-Stadt
	FW	**Thomas Doll**	9 April 1966 (aged 18)	2	1	(Deutscher Fußball-Verband der DDR) FC Hansa Rostock
	FW	Thomas Grether	24 November 1965 (aged 18)	1	0	(Deutscher Fußball-Verband der DDR) BFC Dynamo
	FW	**Ulf Kirsten**	4 December 1965 (aged 18)	3	1	(Deutscher Fußball-Verband der DDR) Dynamo Dresden
	DF	**Olaf Marschall**	19 March 1966 (aged 18)	2	0	(Deutscher Fußball-Verband der DDR) 1. FC Lokomotive Leipzig

=== England ===
Head coach:

No.	Pos.	Player	Date of birth (age)	Caps	Goals	Club
	GK	Perry Suckling	12 October 1964 (aged 19)			(The Football Association) Coventry City
	DF	Nigel Gibbs	20 November 1965 (aged 18)			(The Football Association) Watford
	DF	Gary Elkins	4 May 1966 (aged 18)			(The Football Association) Wimbledon
	DF	Gary Stebbing	11 August 1965 (aged 18)			(The Football Association) Crystal Palace F.C.
	DF	Darren Bradley	1 January 1965 (aged 19)			NA
	MF	Michael Forsyth	20 March 1966 (aged 18)			(The Football Association) West Bromwich Albion
	MF	Richard Cooke	4 September 1965 (aged 18)			(The Football Association) Tottenham Hotspur
	MF	David Lowe	30 August 1965 (aged 18)			(The Football Association) Wigan Athletic
	MF	Gerry Nardiello	5 May 1966 (aged 18)			(The Football Association) Shrewsbury Town
	FW	**Teddy Sheringham**	2 April 1966 (aged 18)			(The Football Association) Millwall
	FW	Gary Cooper	20 November 1965 (aged 18)			(The Football Association) Queens Park Rangers
	MF	Paul Atkinson	19 January 1966 (aged 18)			(The Football Association) Sunderland
	DF	Steve Parkin	7 November 1965 (aged 18)			(The Football Association) Stoke City
	DF	M Brennan	1 January 1965 (aged 19)			NA
	MF	Gary Porter	6 March 1966 (aged 18)			(The Football Association) Watford
	DF	D Andrews	1 January 1965 (aged 19)			NA
	MF	Neil McDonald	2 November 1965 (aged 18)			(The Football Association) Newcastle United

Darren Bradley MF 24/11/1965 Aston Villa Football Club England Mark Robert Brennan MF 04/10/1965 Ipswich Town Football Team England

=== Luxembourg ===
Head coach:

=== Soviet Union ===
Head coach:

== Group D ==
=== Czechoslovakia ===
Head coach:

=== Hungary ===
Head coach: Bertalan Bicskei

No.	Pos.	Player	Date of birth (age)	Caps	Club
1	GK	**Zsolt Petry**	23 September 1966 (aged 17)		(Hungary) MTK
2	DF	Ferenc Haáz	12 February 1966 (aged 18)		(Hungary) Ferencváros
3	DF	**Attila Pintér**	7 May 1966 (aged 18)		(Hungary) Salgótarjáni TC
4	DF	**József Keller**	25 September 1965 (aged 18)		(Hungary) Nagykanizsa FC
5	DF	Sándor Deák	11 September 1965 (aged 18)		(Hungary) Ferencváros
6	DF	László Szélpál	20 August 1965 (aged 18)		(Hungary) SZEOL
7	FW	**István Vincze**	22 January 1967 (aged 17)		(Hungary) Tatabánya
8	FW	György Orovecz	2 October 1967 (aged 16)		(Hungary) MTK
9	FW	**János Zsinka**	2 October 1965 (aged 18)		(Hungary) Volán FC
10	MF	**Ervin Kovács**	24 January 1967 (aged 17)		(Hungary) Újpesti Dózsa
11	FW	**Kálmán Kovács**	11 September 1965 (aged 18)		(Hungary) Honvéd
12	GK	József Szeiler	3 November 1965 (aged 18)		(Hungary) Ferencváros
13	FW	József Takács	16 November 1965 (aged 18)		(Hungary) Diósgyőri VTK
14	MF	Sándor Krizán	27 March 1967 (aged 17)		(Hungary) Nyíregyháza
15	MF	Róbert Csoboth	27 October 1965 (aged 18)		(Hungary) Pécs
16	FW	Gyula Zsivóczky	21 April 1966 (aged 18)		(Hungary) Ferencváros
17	FW	**József Zvara**	17 August 1966 (aged 17)		(Hungary) Vasas SC

=== Spain ===
Head coach:

=== Switzerland ===
Head coach:
