= 1985 FIFA World Youth Championship =

Кубок ФИФА Кока-Кола 1985

Tournament details
- Host country: Soviet Union
- Dates: 24 August – 7 September
- Teams: 16 (from 6 confederations)
- Venues: 10 (in 8 host cities)

Final positions
- Champions: Brazil (2nd title)
- Runners-up: Spain
- Third place: Nigeria
- Fourth place: Soviet Union

Tournament statistics
- Matches played: 32
- Goals scored: 80 (2.5 per match)
- Attendance: 657,800 (20,556 per match)
- Top scorer(s): (Brazil) Gérson (Brazil) Balalo (Brazil) Müller (Spain) Sebastián Losada (Spain) Fernando Gómez (Nigeria) Monday Odiaka (Mexico) Alberto García Aspe (3 goals)
- Best player: (Brazil) Paulo Silas
- Fair play award: Colombia

The 1985 FIFA World Youth Championship was the fifth edition FIFA World Youth Championship, was held in the Soviet Union (USSR) from 24 August to 7 September 1985. The tournament took place in ten venues within eight host cities — Baku, Yerevan, Leningrad, Minsk (2 stadiums), Moscow, Hoktemberyan, Tbilisi (2 stadiums) and Sumqayit — where a total of 32 matches were played. U20 Brazil successfully defended its title, defeating Spain, 1–0, in the final match at Moscow's Luzhniki Stadium.

== Venues ==
10 different stadiums hosted the tournament in 8 host cities, divided among 5 Soviet republics: Armenian SSR (2 venues in 2 host cities), Azerbaijan SSR (2 venues in 2 host cities), Byelorussian SSR (2 venues in 1 host city), Georgian SSR (2 venues in 1 host city), and Russian SFSR (2 venues in 2 host cities).

Moscow	Leningrad	Tbilisi		Yerevan
Central Lenin Stadium	Kirov Stadium	Lenin Dinamo Stadium	Lokomotivi Stadium	Hrazdan Stadium
Capacity: 103,000	Capacity: 72,000	Capacity: 74,354	Capacity: 36,000	Capacity: 70,000
1985 FIFA World Youth Championship is located in the Soviet Union
Minsk		Hoktemberyan	Baku	Sumqayit
Dinamo Stadium	Traktor Stadium	Yubileynyi Stadium	Vladimir Lenin Stadium	Mehdi Huseynzade Stadium
Capacity: 40,000	Capacity: 17,600	Capacity: 10,000	Capacity: 30,000	Capacity: 15,500

== Qualification ==
Confederation	Qualifying Tournament	Qualifier(s)
AFC (Asia)	1985 AFC Youth Championship	China; Saudi Arabia^{1}
CAF (Africa)	1985 African Youth Championship	Nigeria; Tunisia
CONCACAF (North, Central America & Caribbean)	1984 CONCACAF U-20 Tournament	Canada; Mexico
CONMEBOL (South America)	1985 South American Youth Championship	Brazil; Colombia^{1} Paraguay
OFC (Oceania)	1985 OFC U-20 Championship	Australia
UEFA (Europe)	Host nation	Soviet Union
UEFA (Europe)	1984 UEFA European Under-18 Football Championship	Bulgaria^{1} England; Hungary; Republic of Ireland^{1} Spain

1.Teams that made their debut.

== Squads ==
For a list of all squads that played in the final tournament, see 1985 FIFA World Youth Championship squads

== Group stage ==
=== Group A ===
Pos	Team	Pld	W	D	L	GF	GA	GD	Pts	Group stage result
1	Bulgaria	3	1	2	0	4	2	+2	4	Advance to knockout stage
2	Colombia	3	1	2	0	5	4	+1	4 (Note: Colombia advanced by drawing.)	Advance to knockout stage
3	Hungary	3	1	2	0	5	4	+1	4	
4	Tunisia	3	0	0	3	2	6	−4	0	

Notes:
24 August 1985
15:00

Hungary	2–2	Colombia
Pintér 59' (pen.); Zsinka 85'	Report	Pérez 88'; Rodríguez 89'

Hrazdan Stadium, Yerevan
Attendance: 10,000
Referee: George Sandoz (Switzerland)

24 August 1985
19:00

Tunisia	0–2	Bulgaria
	Report	Mihtarski 32'; Penev 78'

Hrazdan Stadium, Yerevan
Attendance: 14,000
Referee: Joseph B. Worrall (England)

26 August 1985
19:00

Hungary	2–1	Tunisia
Pintér 60' (pen.); Fischer 87'	Report	Touati 46'

Hrazdan Stadium, Yerevan
Attendance: 19,000
Referee: Juan Francisco Escobar (Paraguay)

27 August 1985
19:00

Colombia	1–1	Bulgaria
Tréllez 74'	Report	Kalaydzhiev 69'

Hrazdan Stadium, Yerevan
Attendance: 15,000
Referee: Jassim Mandi Abdul-Rahman (Bahrain)

29 August 1985
18:30

Colombia	2–1	Tunisia
Castaño 19'; Tréllez 68'	Report	Abdelhak 76'

Yubileynyi Stadium, Hoktemberyan
Attendance: 9,000
Referee: Vladimir Kuznetsov (Soviet Union)

29 August 1985
19:00

Hungary	1–1	Bulgaria
Fischer 80'	Report	Kostadinov 57'

Hrazdan Stadium, Yerevan
Attendance: 17,000
Referee: Edgardo Codesal (Mexico)

=== Group B ===
Pos	Team	Pld	W	D	L	GF	GA	GD	Pts	Group stage result
1	Brazil	3	3	0	0	5	1	+4	6	Advance to knockout stage
2	Spain	3	1	1	1	4	4	0	3	Advance to knockout stage
3	Saudi Arabia	3	1	1	1	1	1	0	3	
4	Republic of Ireland	3	0	0	3	3	7	−4	0	

24 August 1985
15:00

Republic of Ireland	1–2	Brazil
Tuite 86'	Report	Balalo 20'; Dida 80'

Lenin Dinamo Stadium, Tbilisi
Attendance: 45,000
Referee: Nouhoum Traore (Mali)

24 August 1985
19:00

Saudi Arabia	0–0	Spain
	Report

Lenin Dinamo Stadium, Tbilisi
Attendance: 25,000
Referee: Antonio Evangelista (Canada)

26 August 1985
19:00

Republic of Ireland	0–1	Saudi Arabia
	Report	Al-Jam'an 54' (pen.)

Lenin Dinamo Stadium, Tbilisi
Attendance: 20,000
Referee: Berny Ulloa Morera (Costa Rica)

27 August 1985
19:00

Brazil	2–0	Spain
Luciano 50'; Balalo 65'	Report

Lenin Dinamo Stadium, Tbilisi
Attendance: 20,000
Referee: Jamal Al Sharif (Syria)

29 August 1985
19:00

Republic of Ireland	2–4	Spain
Mooney 51'; Kelch 56' (pen.)	Report	Fernando 3', 61'; Losada 35', 85'

Lenin Dinamo Stadium, Tbilisi
Attendance: 9,800
Referee: Jesús Díaz Palacio (Colombia)

29 August 1985
19:00

Brazil	1–0	Saudi Arabia
Müller 35'	Report

Lokomotivi Stadium, Tbilisi
Attendance: 9,000
Referee: Yuriy Savchenko (Soviet Union)

=== Group C ===
Pos	Team	Pld	W	D	L	GF	GA	GD	Pts	Group stage result
1	Soviet Union (H)	3	2	1	0	7	1	+6	5	Advance to knockout stage
2	Nigeria	3	2	0	1	6	4	+2	4	Advance to knockout stage
3	Australia	3	0	2	1	2	3	−1	2	
4	Canada	3	0	1	2	0	7	−7	1	

(H) Hosts
24 August 1985
15:00

Soviet Union	0–0	Australia
	Report

Dinamo Stadium, Minsk
Attendance: 16,000
Referee: Victoriano Sánchez Arminio (Spain)

24 August 1985
19:00

Nigeria	2–0	Canada
Monday 1'; Siasia 78'	Report

Dinamo Stadium, Minsk
Attendance: 16,000
Referee: Luigi Agnolin (Italy)

26 August 1985
19:00

Soviet Union	2–1	Nigeria
Khudozhilov 23' (pen.); Chedia 41'	Report	Anunobi 81'

Dinamo Stadium, Minsk
Attendance: 23,000
Referee: José Ramiz Wright (Brazil)

27 August 1985
19:00

Australia	0–0	Canada
	Report

Dinamo Stadium, Minsk
Attendance: 8,000
Referee: Ali Bennaucer (Tunisia)

29 August 1985
19:00

Soviet Union	5–0	Canada
Ketashvili 38'; Tatarchuk 39'; Ivanauskas 60'; Sklyarov 64' (pen.); Kuzhlev 79'	Report

Dinamo Stadium, Minsk
Attendance: 16,000
Referee: Joël Quiniou (France)

29 August 1985
19:00

Australia	2–3	Nigeria
Panagis 27'; Kalantzis 38' (pen.)	Report	Adeleye 63'; Monday 78'; Anunobi 79'

Traktor Stadium, Minsk
Attendance: 7,000
Referee: Shizuo Takada (Japan)

=== Group D ===
Pos	Team	Pld	W	D	L	GF	GA	GD	Pts	Group stage result
1	Mexico	3	3	0	0	6	1	+5	6	Advance to knockout stage
2	China	3	2	0	1	5	4	+1	4	Advance to knockout stage
3	Paraguay	3	0	1	2	3	6	−3	1	
4	England	3	0	1	2	2	5	−3	1	

24 August 1985
15:00

England	2–2	Paraguay
Wakenshaw 19'; Priest 31'	Report	Cartaman 41'; Jara 74'

Vladimir Lenin Stadium, Baku
Attendance: 40,000
Referee: Laszlo Padar (Hungary)

24 August 1985
19:00

China	1–3	Mexico
Gong Lei 68'	Report	Ambríz 19' (pen.); García Aspe 30', 45'

Vladimir Lenin Stadium, Baku
Attendance: 30,000
Referee: William K. Munro (New Zealand)

26 August 1985
19:00

England	0–2	China
	Report	Gao Hongbo 76'; Gong Lei 89'

Vladimir Lenin Stadium, Baku
Attendance: 12,000
Referee: Juan Daniel Cardellino (Uruguay)

27 August 1985
19:00

Paraguay	0–2	Mexico
	Report	Cruz 22'; García Aspe 70'

Vladimir Lenin Stadium, Baku
Attendance: 7,000
Referee: Edwin Picon-Ackong (Mauritius)

29 August 1985
19:00

England	0–1	Mexico
	Report	Becerra 34'

Vladimir Lenin Stadium, Baku
Attendance: 12,000
Referee: Hernán Silva (Chile)

29 August 1985
19:00

Paraguay	1–2	China
Mereles 17'	Report	Song Lianyong 14'; Gao Hongbo 76'

Mehdi Huseynzade Stadium, Sumgait
Attendance: 15,500
Referee: David Syme (Scotland)

== Knockout stage ==
Quarter-finals
September 1 - Yerevan
Bulgaria	1
Spain	2
September 1 - Minsk
Soviet Union	1
China	0
September 1 - Tbilisi
Brazil	6
Colombia	0
September 1 - Baku
Mexico	1
Nigeria	2

Semi-finals
September 4 - Moscow
Spain (p)	2 (4)
Soviet Union	2 (3)
September 4 - Leningrad
Brazil	2
Nigeria	0

Final
September 7 - Moscow
Spain	0
Brazil (a.e.t.)	1
Third place
September 7 - Moscow
Soviet Union	0 (1)
Nigeria (p)	0 (3)

=== Quarterfinals ===
1 September 1985
19:00

Bulgaria	1–2	Spain
Kostadinov 47'	Report	Marcelino 33'; Fernando 67' (pen.)

Hrazdan Stadium, Yerevan
Attendance: 20,500
Referee: Joe Worrall (England)

1 September 1985
17:00

Brazil	6–0	Colombia
Gérson 51', 69', 90''; Silas 54'; Dida 72'; Müller 81'	Report

Lenin Dinamo Stadium, Tbilisi
Attendance: 20,000
Referee: Berny Ulloa Morera (Costa Rica)

1 September 1985
17:00

Soviet Union	1–0	China
Kuzhlev 1'	Report

Dinamo Stadium, Minsk
Attendance: 40,000
Referee: Ali Bennaceur (Tunisia)

1 September 1985
17:00

Mexico	1–2	Nigeria
Medina 50'	Report	Igbinabaro 33'; Monday 35'

Vladimir Lenin Stadium, Baku
Attendance: 20,000
Referee: Juan Daniel Cardellino (Uruguay)

=== Semi-finals ===
4 September 1985
19:00

Spain	2–2 (a.e.t.)	Soviet Union
Losada 70'; Goikoetxea 120'	Report	Khudozhilov 38' (pen.); Ivanauskas 107'
Penalties
	4–3

Central Lenin Stadium, Moscow
Attendance: 37,000
Referee: Hernán Silva (Chile)

4 September 1985
18:00

Brazil	2–0	Nigeria
Müller 22'; Balalo 44'	Report

Kirov Stadium, Leningrad
Attendance: 51,500
Referee: Joël Quiniou (France)

=== Third place play-off ===
7 September 1985
13:00

Soviet Union	0–0 (a.e.t.)	Nigeria
	(Report)
Penalties
	1–3

Central Lenin Stadium, Moscow
Attendance: 12,500
Referee: Jassim Mandi Abdul-Rahman (Bahrain)

=== Final ===
7 September 1985
19:00

Brazil	1–0 (a.e.t.)	Spain
Henrique 92'	Report

Central Lenin Stadium, Moscow
Attendance: 41,000
Referee: David Syme (Scotland)

== Result ==
1985 World Youth Championship winners

Brazil
Second title

== Awards ==
Golden Shoe	Golden Ball	FIFA Fair Play Award
(Spain) Sebastián Losada	(Brazil) Paulo Silas	Colombia

== Goalscorers ==
Sebastián Losada of Spain won the Golden Boot award for scoring three goals. In total, 80 goals were scored by 55 different players, with none of them credited as own goal.

3 goals

- (Brazil) Balalo
- (Brazil) Gérson
- (Brazil) Müller
- (Mexico) Alberto García Aspe
- (Nigeria) Odiaka Monday
- (Spain) Fernando Gómez Colomer
- (Spain) Sebastián Losada

2 goals

- (Brazil) Dida
- (Bulgaria) Emil Kostadinov
- (China) Gao Hongbo
- (China) Gong Lei
- (Colombia) John Jairo Tréllez
- (Hungary) Attila Pintér
- (Hungary) Pál Fischer
- (Nigeria) Mark Anunobi
- (Soviet Union) Oleg Kuzhlev
- (Soviet Union) Sergei Khudozhilov
- (Soviet Union) Valdas Ivanauskas

1 goal

- (Australia) Cris Kalantzis
- (Australia) John Panagis
- (Brazil) Henrique Arlindo Etges
- (Brazil) Luciano
- (Brazil) Paulo Silas
- (Bulgaria) Lyuboslav Penev
- (Bulgaria) Petar Mihtarski
- (Bulgaria) Radko Kalaydjiev
- (China) Song Lianyong
- (Colombia) Felipe Pérez
- (Colombia) John Castaño
- (Colombia) Wilson Rodríguez
- (England) Philip Priest
- (England) Robert Wakenshaw
- (Hungary) János Zsinka
- (Republic of Ireland) Brian Mooney
- (Republic of Ireland) Pat Kelch
- (Republic of Ireland) Marcus Tuite
- (Mexico) Francisco Javier Cruz
- (Mexico) Héctor Becerra
- (Mexico) Ignacio Ambríz
- (Mexico) Víctor Medina
- (Nigeria) Augustine Igbinabaro
- (Nigeria) Niyi Adeleye
- (Nigeria) Samson Siasia
- (Paraguay) Jorge Cartaman
- (Paraguay) Luis Jara
- (Paraguay) Trigo Mereles
- (Saudi Arabia) Mohaisen Al-Jam'an
- (Soviet Union) Igor Sklyarov
- (Soviet Union) Gela Ketashvili
- (Soviet Union) Soso Chedia
- (Soviet Union) Vladimir Tatarchuk
- (Spain) Jon Andoni Goikoetxea
- (Spain) Marcelino
- (Tunisia) Mohamed Abdelhak
- (Tunisia) Sami Touati

== Final ranking ==
Pos	Team	Pld	W	D	L	GF	GA	GD	Pts	Final result
1	Brazil	6	6	0	0	14	1	+13	12	Champions
2	Spain	6	2	2	2	8	8	0	6	Runners-up
3	Nigeria	6	3	1	2	8	7	+1	7	Third place
4	Soviet Union (H)	6	3	3	0	10	3	+7	9	Fourth place
5	Mexico	4	3	0	1	7	3	+4	6	Eliminated in Quarter-finals
6	China	4	2	0	2	5	5	0	4	Eliminated in Quarter-finals
7	Bulgaria	4	1	2	1	5	4	+1	4	Eliminated in Quarter-finals
8	Colombia	4	1	2	1	5	10	−5	4	Eliminated in Quarter-finals
9	Hungary	3	1	2	0	5	4	+1	4	Eliminated in Group stage
10	Saudi Arabia	3	1	1	1	1	1	0	3	Eliminated in Group stage
11	Australia	3	0	2	1	2	3	−1	2	Eliminated in Group stage
12	Paraguay	3	0	1	2	3	6	−3	1	Eliminated in Group stage
13	England	3	0	1	2	2	5	−3	1	Eliminated in Group stage
14	Canada	3	0	1	2	0	7	−7	1	Eliminated in Group stage
15	Republic of Ireland	3	0	0	3	3	7	−4	0	Eliminated in Group stage
16	Tunisia	3	0	0	3	2	6	−4	0	Eliminated in Group stage

Source: rsssf.com
(H) Hosts
