= 2021–22 Bundesliga =

59th season of Bundesliga

Bundesliga
- Season: 2021–22
- Dates: 13 August 2021 – 14 May 2022
- Champions: Bayern Munich; 31st Bundesliga title 32nd German title
- Relegated: Arminia Bielefeld; SpVgg Greuther Fürth
- Champions League: Bayern Munich; Borussia Dortmund; Bayer Leverkusen; RB Leipzig; Eintracht Frankfurt (Note: Eintracht Frankfurt qualified for the Champions League group stage by winning the 2021–22 UEFA Europa League.)
- Europa League: Union Berlin; SC Freiburg
- Europa Conference League: 1. FC Köln
- Matches: 306
- Goals: 954 (3.12 per match)
- Top goalscorer: Robert Lewandowski (35 goals)
- Biggest home win: Bayern Munich 7–0 Bochum
- Biggest away win: Mönchengladbach 0–6 Freiburg
- Highest scoring: Fürth 3–6 Hoffenheim
- Longest winning run: 5 games Munich
- Longest unbeaten run: 10 games Freiburg
- Longest winless run: 14 games Fürth
- Longest losing run: 12 games Fürth
- Highest attendance: 81,365; Dortmund v Leipzig
- Attendance: 6,431,246 (21,017 per match) (Note: Due to the COVID-19 pandemic in Germany, each local health department allowed a different number of spectators.)

The 2021–22 Bundesliga was the 59th season of the Bundesliga, Germany's premier football competition. It began on 13 August 2021 and concluded on 14 May 2022. The fixtures were announced on 25 June 2021.

Bayern Munich were the defending champions and successfully defended their title, winning their record-extending 10th consecutive title and 32nd title overall (31st in the Bundesliga era) on 23 April with three matches to spare. Bayern also became the first ever club in Europe's top five leagues to achieve a tenth consecutive league title, the previous record being Juventus' nine consecutive titles from 2012 to 2020.

Arminia Bielefeld and Greuther Furth were relegated to the 2. Bundesliga.

== Teams ==
Locations of the 2021–22 Bundesliga teams

A total of eighteen teams participated in the 2021–22 edition of the Bundesliga.

=== Team changes ===
Promoted from 2020–21 2. Bundesliga	Relegated from 2020–21 Bundesliga
VfL Bochum; Greuther Fürth	Werder Bremen; Schalke 04

=== Stadiums and locations ===
Team	Location	Stadium	Capacity	Ref.
FC Augsburg	Augsburg	WWK Arena	30,660	
Hertha BSC	Berlin	Olympiastadion	74,649	
Union Berlin	Berlin	Stadion An der Alten Försterei	22,012	
Arminia Bielefeld	Bielefeld	Schüco-Arena	27,300	
VfL Bochum	Bochum	Vonovia Ruhrstadion	27,599	
Borussia Dortmund	Dortmund	Signal Iduna Park	81,365	
Eintracht Frankfurt	Frankfurt	Deutsche Bank Park	51,500	
SC Freiburg	Freiburg im Breisgau	Dreisamstadion; Europa-Park Stadion^{1}	24,000; 34,700	
Greuther Fürth	Fürth	Sportpark Ronhof Thomas Sommer	16,626	
1899 Hoffenheim	Sinsheim	PreZero Arena	30,150	
1. FC Köln	Cologne	RheinEnergieStadion	49,698	
RB Leipzig	Leipzig	Red Bull Arena	47,069	
Bayer Leverkusen	Leverkusen	BayArena	30,210	
Mainz 05	Mainz	Mewa Arena	34,000	
Borussia Mönchengladbach	Mönchengladbach	Borussia-Park	54,057	
Bayern Munich	Munich	Allianz Arena	75,000	
VfB Stuttgart	Stuttgart	Mercedes-Benz Arena	60,449	
VfL Wolfsburg	Wolfsburg	Volkswagen Arena	30,000	

^{1} SC Freiburg played their first three home matches at the Dreisamstadion before permanently moving to the Europa-Park Stadion.

=== Personnel and kits ===
Team	Manager	Captain	Kit manufacturer	Shirt sponsor	
Team	Manager	Captain	Kit manufacturer	Front	Sleeve
FC Augsburg	(Germany) Markus Weinzierl	(Netherlands) Jeffrey Gouweleeuw	Nike	WWK	Siegmund
Hertha BSC	(Germany) Felix Magath	(Belgium) Dedryck Boyata	Nike	Autohero	Hyundai
Union Berlin	(Switzerland) Urs Fischer	(Austria) Christopher Trimmel	Adidas	Aroundtown	wefox/Comedy Central (in cup and UEFA matches)
Arminia Bielefeld	(Germany) Marco Kostmann	(Germany) Fabian Klos/Manuel Prietl	Macron	Schüco	JAB Anstoetz Textilien
VfL Bochum	(Germany) Thomas Reis	(France) Anthony Losilla	Nike	Vonovia	Viactiv Betriebskrankenkasse
Borussia Dortmund	(Germany) Marco Rose	(Germany) Marco Reus	Puma	1&1/Evonik (in cup and UEFA matches)	Opel/GLS Group (in cup and UEFA matches)
Eintracht Frankfurt	(Austria) Oliver Glasner	(Germany) Sebastian Rode	Nike	Indeed.com	dpd
SC Freiburg	(Germany) Christian Streich	(Germany) Christian Günter	Nike	Schwarzwaldmilch	ROSE Bikes
Greuther Fürth	(Germany) Stefan Leitl	(Sweden) Branimir Hrgota	Puma	Hofmann Personal	BVUK
1899 Hoffenheim	(Germany) Sebastian Hoeneß	(Germany) Benjamin Hübner	Joma	SAP	SNP
1. FC Köln	(Germany) Steffen Baumgart	(Germany) Jonas Hector	Uhlsport	REWE	DEVK
RB Leipzig	(Italy) Domenico Tedesco	(Hungary) Péter Gulácsi	Nike	Red Bull	CG Immobilien/Veganz (in cup and UEFA matches)
Bayer Leverkusen	(Switzerland) Gerardo Seoane	(Finland) Lukáš Hrádecký	Jako	Barmenia Versicherungen	Iqoniq/Floki (since Dec 2021)/Kumho Tyres (in cup matches)/The Football Club Social Alliance (in UEFA matches)
Mainz 05	(Denmark) Bo Svensson	(France) Moussa Niakhaté	Kappa	Kömmerling	fb88.com
Borussia Mönchengladbach	(Austria) Adi Hütter	(Germany) Lars Stindl	Puma	flatex	Sonepar
Bayern Munich	(Germany) Julian Nagelsmann	(Germany) Manuel Neuer	Adidas	Deutsche Telekom	Qatar Airways/Audi (in cup and UEFA matches)
VfB Stuttgart	(United States) Pellegrino Matarazzo	(Japan) Wataru Endo	Jako	Mercedes-Benz Bank	Mercedes-Benz EQ
VfL Wolfsburg	(Germany) Florian Kohfeldt	(Belgium) Koen Casteels	Nike	Volkswagen	Linglong Tire

=== Managerial changes ===
Team	Outgoing	Manner	Exit date		Position in table	Incoming	Incoming date		Ref.
Team	Outgoing	Manner	Announced on	Departed on	Position in table	Incoming	Announced on	Arrived on	Ref.
Borussia Dortmund	(Germany) Edin Terzić (interim)	End of caretaker spell	13 December 2020	30 June 2021	Pre-season	(Germany) Marco Rose	15 February 2021	1 July 2021	
Borussia Mönchengladbach	(Germany) Marco Rose	Signed for Borussia Dortmund	15 February 2021	30 June 2021	Pre-season	(Austria) Adi Hütter	13 April 2021	1 July 2021	
Bayer Leverkusen	(Germany) Hannes Wolf (interim)	End of caretaker spell	23 March 2021	30 June 2021	Pre-season	(Switzerland) Gerardo Seoane	19 May 2021	1 July 2021	
1. FC Köln	(Germany) Friedhelm Funkel	End of caretaker spell	8 April 2021	30 June 2021	Pre-season	(Germany) Steffen Baumgart	11 May 2021	1 July 2021	
Eintracht Frankfurt	(Austria) Adi Hütter	Signed for Borussia Mönchengladbach	13 April 2021	30 June 2021	Pre-season	(Austria) Oliver Glasner	26 May 2021	1 July 2021	
Bayern Munich	(Germany) Hansi Flick	Signed for Germany	27 April 2021	30 June 2021	Pre-season	(Germany) Julian Nagelsmann	27 April 2021	1 July 2021	
RB Leipzig	(Germany) Julian Nagelsmann	Signed for Bayern Munich	27 April 2021	30 June 2021	Pre-season	(United States) Jesse Marsch	29 April 2021	1 July 2021	
VfL Wolfsburg	(Austria) Oliver Glasner	Signed for Eintracht Frankfurt	26 May 2021	30 June 2021	Pre-season	(Netherlands) Mark van Bommel	2 June 2021	1 July 2021	
VfL Wolfsburg	(Netherlands) Mark van Bommel	Sacked	24 October 2021		8th	(Germany) Florian Kohfeldt	26 October 2021		
Hertha BSC	(Hungary) Pál Dárdai	Sacked	29 November 2021		14th	(Turkey) Tayfun Korkut	29 November 2021		
RB Leipzig	(United States) Jesse Marsch	Sacked	5 December 2021		11th	(Germany) Achim Beierlorzer (interim)	5 December 2021		
RB Leipzig	(Germany) Achim Beierlorzer (interim)	End of caretaker spell	9 December 2021		11th	(Italy) Domenico Tedesco	9 December 2021		
Hertha BSC	(Turkey) Tayfun Korkut	Sacked	13 March 2022		17th	(Germany) Felix Magath (interim)	13 March 2022		
Arminia Bielefeld	(Germany) Frank Kramer	Sacked	20 April 2022		17th	(Germany) Marco Kostmann (interim)	20 April 2022		

== League table ==
Pos	Team	Pld	W	D	L	GF	GA	GD	Pts	Qualification or relegation
1	Bayern Munich (C)	34	24	5	5	97	37	+60	77	Qualification for the Champions League group stage
2	Borussia Dortmund	34	22	3	9	85	52	+33	69	Qualification for the Champions League group stage
3	Bayer Leverkusen	34	19	7	8	80	47	+33	64	Qualification for the Champions League group stage
4	RB Leipzig	34	17	7	10	72	37	+35	58	Qualification for the Champions League group stage
5	Union Berlin	34	16	9	9	50	44	+6	57	Qualification for the Europa League group stage (Note: Since the 2021–22 DFB-Pokal winners, RB Leipzig, qualified for the Champions League based on league position, the Europa League group stage spot was passed to the sixth-placed team, and the Europa Conference League play-off round spot was passed to the seventh-placed team.)
6	SC Freiburg	34	15	10	9	58	46	+12	55	Qualification for the Europa League group stage
7	1. FC Köln	34	14	10	10	52	49	+3	52	Qualification for the Europa Conference League play-off round
8	Mainz 05	34	13	7	14	50	45	+5	46	
9	1899 Hoffenheim	34	13	7	14	58	60	−2	46	
10	Borussia Mönchengladbach	34	12	9	13	54	61	−7	45	
11	Eintracht Frankfurt	34	10	12	12	45	49	−4	42	Qualification for the Champions League group stage (Note: Eintracht Frankfurt qualified for the Champions League group stage by winning the UEFA Europa League.)
12	VfL Wolfsburg	34	12	6	16	43	54	−11	42	
13	VfL Bochum	34	12	6	16	38	52	−14	42	
14	FC Augsburg	34	10	8	16	39	56	−17	38	
15	VfB Stuttgart	34	7	12	15	41	59	−18	33	
16	Hertha BSC (O)	34	9	6	19	37	71	−34	33	Qualification for the relegation play-offs
17	Arminia Bielefeld (R)	34	5	13	16	27	53	−26	28	Relegation to 2. Bundesliga
18	Greuther Fürth (R)	34	3	9	22	28	82	−54	18	Relegation to 2. Bundesliga

Source: DFB
Rules for classification: 1) Points; 2) Goal difference; 3) Goals scored; 4) Head-to-head results; 5) Head-to-head away goals scored; 6) Away goals scored; 7) Play-off.
(C) Champions; (O) Play-off winners; (R) Relegated

== Results ==
Home \ Away	AUG	BSC	UNB	BIE	BOC	DOR	FRA	FRE	FÜR	HOF	KÖL	LEI	LEV	MAI	MÖN	MUN	STU	WOL
FC Augsburg	—	0–1	2–0	1–1	2–3	1–1	1–1	1–2	2–1	0–4	1–4	1–1	1–4	2–1	1–0	2–1	4–1	3–0
Hertha BSC	1–1	—	1–4	2–0	1–1	3–2	1–4	1–2	2–1	3–0	1–3	1–6	1–1	1–2	1–0	1–4	2–0	1–2
Union Berlin	0–0	2–0	—	1–0	3–2	0–3	2–0	0–0	1–1	2–1	1–0	2–1	1–1	3–1	2–1	2–5	1–1	2–0
Arminia Bielefeld	0–1	1–1	1–0	—	2–0	1–3	1–1	0–0	2–2	0–0	1–1	1–1	0–4	1–2	1–1	0–3	1–1	2–2
VfL Bochum	0–2	1–3	0–1	2–1	—	1–1	2–0	2–1	2–1	2–0	2–2	0–1	0–0	2–0	0–2 (Note: The VfL Bochum v Borussia Mönchengladbach match from 18 March 2022 was suspended after 69 minutes and a score of 0–2 due to an assistant referee being hit by a beverage cup thrown from the stands. The match was abandoned and later awarded on 24 March 2022 to Borussia Mönchengladbach with a score of 0–2.)	4–2	0–0	1–0
Borussia Dortmund	2–1	2–1	4–2	1–0	3–4	—	5–2	5–1	3–0	3–2	2–0	1–4	2–5	3–1	6–0	2–3	2–1	6–1
Eintracht Frankfurt	0–0	1–2	2–1	0–2	2–1	2–3	—	1–2	0–0	2–2	1–1	1–1	5–2	1–0	1–1	0–1	1–1	0–2
SC Freiburg	3–0	3–0	1–4	2–2	3–0	2–1	0–2	—	3–1	1–2	1–1	1–1	2–1	1–1	3–3	1–4	2–0	3–2
Greuther Fürth	0–0	2–1	1–0	1–1	0–1	1–3	1–2	0–0	—	3–6	1–1	1–6	1–4	2–1	0–2	1–3	0–0	0–2
1899 Hoffenheim	3–1	2–0	2–2	2–0	1–2	2–3	3–2	3–4	0–0	—	5–0	2–0	2–4	0–2	1–1	1–1	2–1	3–1
1. FC Köln	0–2	3–1	2–2	3–1	2–1	1–1	1–0	1–0	3–1	0–1	—	1–1	2–2	3–2	4–1	0–4	1–0	0–1
RB Leipzig	4–0	6–0	1–2	0–2	3–0	2–1	0–0	1–1	4–1	3–0	3–1	—	1–3	4–1	4–1	1–4	4–0	2–0
Bayer Leverkusen	5–1	2–1	2–2	3–0	1–0	3–4	2–0	2–1	7–1	2–2	0–1	0–1	—	1–0	4–0	1–5	4–2	0–2
Mainz 05	4–1	4–0	1–2	4–0	1–0	0–1	2–2	0–0	3–0	2–0	1–1	1–0	3–2	—	1–1	3–1	0–0	3–0
Borussia Mönchengladbach	3–2	2–0	1–2	3–1	2–1	1–0	2–3	0–6	4–0	5–1	1–3	3–1	1–2	1–1	—	1–1	1–1	2–2
Bayern Munich	1–0	5–0	4–0	1–0	7–0	3–1	1–2	2–1	4–1	4–0	3–2	3–2	1–1	2–1	1–2	—	2–2	4–0
VfB Stuttgart	3–2	2–2	1–1	0–1	1–1	0–2	2–3	2–3	5–1	3–1	2–1	0–2	1–3	2–1	3–2	0–5	—	1–1
VfL Wolfsburg	1–0	0–0	1–0	4–0	1–0	1–3	1–1	0–2	4–1	1–2	2–3	1–0	0–2	5–0	1–3	2–2	0–2	—

Source: DFB
Legend: Blue = home team win; Yellow = draw; Red = away team win.

== Relegation play-offs ==
The relegation play-offs took place on 19 and 23 May 2022. The away goals rule is no longer used as of the 2021/22 season.

=== Overview ===
Team 1	Agg.	Team 2	1st leg	2nd leg
Hertha BSC (B)	2–1	Hamburger SV (2B)	0–1	2–0

=== Matches ===
All times Central European Summer Time (UTC+2)

19 May 2022
20:30

Hertha BSC	0–1	Hamburger SV
	Report	Reis 57'

Olympiastadion, Berlin
Attendance: 75,500
Referee: Harm Osmers
23 May 2022
20:30

Hamburger SV	0–2	Hertha BSC
	Report	Boyata 4'; Plattenhardt 63'

Volksparkstadion, Hamburg
Attendance: 57,000
Referee: Deniz Aytekin

Hertha BSC won 2–1 on aggregate, and therefore both clubs remained in their respective leagues.

== Statistics ==
=== Top goalscorers ===
Rank	Player	Club	Goals
1	(Poland) Robert Lewandowski	Bayern Munich	35
2	(Czech Republic) Patrik Schick	Bayer Leverkusen	24
3	(Norway) Erling Haaland	Borussia Dortmund	22
4	(France) Anthony Modeste	1. FC Köln	20
4	(France) Christopher Nkunku	RB Leipzig	20
6	(Nigeria) Taiwo Awoniyi	Union Berlin	15
7	(Germany) Serge Gnabry	Bayern Munich	14
8	(France) Moussa Diaby	Bayer Leverkusen	13
9	(Germany) Jonas Hofmann	Borussia Mönchengladbach	12
9	(Germany) Max Kruse	Union Berlin; VfL Wolfsburg	12

=== Hat-tricks ===
Player	Club	Against	Result	Date
(Poland) Robert Lewandowski	Bayern Munich	Hertha BSC	5–0 (H)	28 August 2021
(Togo) Ihlas Bebou	1899 Hoffenheim	Greuther Fürth	6–3 (A)	27 November 2021
(Czech Republic) Patrik Schick^{4}	Bayer Leverkusen	Greuther Fürth	7–1 (H)	4 December 2021
(Germany) Serge Gnabry	Bayern Munich	VfB Stuttgart	5–0 (A)	14 December 2021
(Poland) Robert Lewandowski	Bayern Munich	1. FC Köln	4–0 (A)	15 January 2022
(France) Moussa Diaby	Bayer Leverkusen	FC Augsburg	5–1 (H)	22 January 2022
(Germany) Max Kruse	VfL Wolfsburg	Mainz 05	5–0 (H)	22 April 2022
(Norway) Erling Haaland	Borussia Dortmund	VfL Bochum	3–4 (H)	30 April 2022

- ^{4} Player scored four goals.

=== Clean sheets ===
Rank	Player	Club	Clean sheets
1	(Belgium) Koen Casteels	VfL Wolfsburg	10
1	(Netherlands) Mark Flekken	SC Freiburg	10
1	(Germany) Manuel Neuer	Bayern Munich	10
1	(Germany) Robin Zentner	Mainz 05	10
5	(Poland) Rafał Gikiewicz	FC Augsburg	9
5	(Hungary) Péter Gulácsi	RB Leipzig	9
7	(Finland) Lukáš Hrádecký	Bayer Leverkusen	8
7	(Germany) Oliver Baumann	1899 Hoffenheim	8
9	(Switzerland) Gregor Kobel	Borussia Dortmund	7
9	(Germany) Manuel Riemann	VfL Bochum	7

== Awards ==
=== Monthly awards ===
Month	Player of the Month		Rookie of the Month		Goal of the Month		Ref.
Month	Player	Club	Player	Club	Player	Club	Ref.
August	(Norway) Erling Haaland	Borussia Dortmund	(Hungary) Dominik Szoboszlai	RB Leipzig	(Philippines) Gerrit Holtmann	VfL Bochum	
September	(Germany) Florian Wirtz	Bayer Leverkusen	(Egypt) Omar Marmoush	VfB Stuttgart	(Norway) Erling Haaland	Borussia Dortmund	
October	(France) Christopher Nkunku	RB Leipzig	(Hungary) Dominik Szoboszlai	RB Leipzig	(England) Jude Bellingham	Borussia Dortmund	
November	(Canada) Alphonso Davies	Bayern Munich	(Japan) Hiroki Itō	VfB Stuttgart	(Norway) Erling Haaland	Borussia Dortmund	
December	(Czech Republic) Patrik Schick	Bayer Leverkusen	(Denmark) Jesper Lindstrøm	Eintracht Frankfurt	(Germany) Niklas Dorsch	FC Augsburg	
January	(Germany) Thomas Müller	Bayern Munich	(Austria) Patrick Wimmer	Arminia Bielefeld	(France) Corentin Tolisso	Bayern Munich	
February	(France) Christopher Nkunku	RB Leipzig	(Denmark) Jonas Wind	VfL Wolfsburg	(Denmark) Jonas Wind	VfL Wolfsburg	
March	(France) Christopher Nkunku	RB Leipzig	(Egypt) Omar Marmoush	VfB Stuttgart	(France) Kingsley Coman	Bayern Munich	
April	(France) Christopher Nkunku	RB Leipzig	(Hungary) Dominik Szoboszlai	RB Leipzig	—N/a		

=== Annual awards ===
Award	Winner	Club	Ref.
Player of the Season	(France) Christopher Nkunku	RB Leipzig	
Rookie of the Season	(Denmark) Jesper Lindstrøm	Eintracht Frankfurt	
Goal of the Season	(Philippines) Gerrit Holtmann	VfL Bochum	

=== Team of the season ===
==== kicker ====
Pos.	Player	Club	Ref.
GK	(Germany) Marvin Schwäbe	1. FC Köln	
DF	(Germany) Christian Günter	SC Freiburg	
DF	(Germany) Nico Schlotterbeck	SC Freiburg	
DF	(Germany) Niklas Süle	Bayern Munich	
DF	(Netherlands) Jeremie Frimpong	Bayer Leverkusen	
MF	(France) Christopher Nkunku	RB Leipzig	
MF	(Turkey) Salih Özcan	1. FC Köln	
MF	(Germany) Jamal Musiala	Bayern Munich	
FW	(Norway) Erling Haaland	Borussia Dortmund	
FW	(Poland) Robert Lewandowski	Bayern Munich	
FW	(Czech Republic) Patrik Schick	Bayer Leverkusen	

==== EA Sports ====
Pos.	Player	Club	Ref.
GK	(Germany) Manuel Neuer	Bayern Munich	
DF	(Canada) Alphonso Davies	Bayern Munich	
DF	(France) Evan Ndicka	Eintracht Frankfurt	
DF	(Germany) Nico Schlotterbeck	SC Freiburg	
DF	(Germany) David Raum	1899 Hoffenheim	
MF	(England) Jude Bellingham	Borussia Dortmund	
MF	(Germany) Joshua Kimmich	Bayern Munich	
MF	(Germany) Florian Wirtz	Bayer Leverkusen	
FW	(Norway) Erling Haaland	Borussia Dortmund	
FW	(Poland) Robert Lewandowski	Bayern Munich	
FW	(France) Christopher Nkunku	RB Leipzig	
