= Kelch =

Kelch (from the Flemish for chalice) may refer to:

- Kelch motif, a region of protein sequence
- Kelch proteins, which contain multiple Kelch motifs
- A type of beer glass or goblet, used for Trappist ales
- Kelch (surname)
