= Marco Kostmann =

German footballer (born 1966)

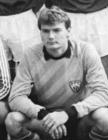
- Kostmann with BFC Dynamo at the Friedrich-Ludwig-Jahn-Sportpark in 1987

Personal information
- Date of birth: 12 April 1966 (age 60)
- Place of birth: Rostock, East Germany
- Height: 1.86 m (6 ft 1 in)
- Position: Goalkeeper

Team information
- Current team: Augsburg (goalkeeping coach)

Youth career
- 1971–1981: Dynamo Rostock-Mitte
- 1981–1984: BFC Dynamo

Senior career*
Years	Team	Apps	(Gls)
1984–1988	BFC Dynamo II	89	(0)
1984–1988	BFC Dynamo	0	(0)
1988–1989	Hansa Rostock	0	(0)
1989–1991	Union Berlin	36	(0)
1991–1994	Saarbrücken	41	(0)
1994–1997	Hamburger SV II		
1997–1998	Norderstedt		
1998–2000	Paderborn	36	(0)

Managerial career
- 1999: Paderborn (player-manager)
- 2000–2003: St. Pauli (youth)
- 2007–2009: Ivory Coast (goalk. coach)
- 2009–2010: Hansa Rostock (goalk. coach)
- 2010: Hansa Rostock
- 2011–2012: Arminia Bielefeld II (goalk. coach)
- 2011–2015: Arminia Bielefeld (goalk. coach)
- 2015–2017: Hamburger SV II (goalk. coach)
- 2017–2023: Arminia Bielefeld (goalk. coach)
- 2022: → Arminia Bielefeld
- 2023–: Augsburg (goalk. coach)
- * Club domestic league appearances and goals

Marco Kostmann (born 12 April 1966) is a German football goalkeeper and later manager.

He is a son of Gerd Kostmann. He started his youth career in Dynamo Rostock-Mitte, moving to BFC Dynamo in 1981. He was also a youth international for East Germany. Among others, he was a squad member for the 1984 UEFA European Under-18 Championship.

After several years in BFC Dynamo he joined his hometown team FC Hansa Rostock in 1988, but went on to 1. FC Union Berlin one year later. Then, after several years in the DDR-Liga, Kostmann moved to the West and played in the 2. Bundesliga and Bundesliga for 1. FC Saarbrücken. He moved on to Hamburger SV, but did not get any first-team games.

Near the end of his playing career he held his first job as a manager, in SC Paderborn 07. He later worked several years for the German Football Association as a youth goalkeeping coach and coordinator in Schleswig-Holstein. From 2007 to 2009 he was goalkeeping coach of the Ivory Coast men's national football team under manager Uli Stielike. He then rejoined Hansa Rostock, this time as goalkeeping coach. He also served as manager of Hansa Rostock before a long stint in Arminia Bielefeld. In April 2022, he was briefly promoted to manager. He was ultimately let go at Arminia Bielefeld in June 2023.
