= Jacek Duchowski =

Polish footballer

Personal information
- Date of birth: 2 January 1966 (age 60)
- Place of birth: Świnoujście, Poland
- Height: 1.78 m (5 ft 10 in)
- Position: Defender

Senior career*
Years	Team	Apps	(Gls)
1984–1985	Pogoń Szczecin	11	(0)
1986–1988	Olimpia Poznań	65	(3)
1989–1990	GKS Katowice	19	(2)
Total		95	(5)

International career
- Poland U18
1990	Poland	1	(0)
Medal record
Men's football
Representing Poland
UEFA European Under-18 Championship
Third place	1984 Soviet Union
- * Club domestic league appearances and goals

Jacek Duchowski (born 2 January 1966) is a Polish former professional footballer who played as a defender.

He made one appearance for the Poland national team in a 1–0 friendly win over Iran on 4 February 1990.

== Honours ==
Poland U18

- UEFA European Under-18 Championship third place: 1984
