= Holstebro Boldklub =

Danish football club

- Full name: Holstebro Boldklub
- Short name: HB
- Founded: 21 March 1921; 105 years ago
- Ground: Holstebro Idrætspark
- Capacity: 15,000
- Chairman: Kåre Madsen
- Manager: Kim Kristensen
- League: Danish 3rd Division
- 2025–26: Denmark Series Promotion group west, 1st of 10 (promoted)
- Website: https://www.holstebroboldklub.dk/
Home colours	Away colours

Holstebro Boldklub (Danish pronunciation: [hʌlˌstəˈpʁoˀ ˈpʌlˀtkʰlup]; also simply called Holstebro or HB) is an association football club based in the town of Holstebro, West Jutland, Denmark, that competes in the Danish 3rd Division, the fourth tier of the Danish football league system. Founded in 1921, it is affiliated to the DBU Jutland, the regional body of football in Jutland. The team plays its home matches at Holstebro Idrætspark, where it has been based since 1989.

== History ==
=== Formation and early development (1921–1940s) ===
Holstebro Boldklub was established on 21 March 1921. Previously, cricket was the main sport in Holstebro, with association football introduced in the region around the turn of the century. The town's first recorded football match was held on the market square between Holstebro Idrætsforening, a precursor to Holstebro Boldklub, and the main club from nearby Lemvig. Interest in football grew rapidly, especially after the Holstebro–Lemvig teams became among Jutland's strongest in the 1910s, attracting a record 5,000 spectators in a 1919 match against Skive.

Johannes Nielsen organised a meeting on 21 March 1921 at Holstebro's temperance hotel, resulting in the formation of Holstebro Boldklub. Nielsen served as the first chairman, with a board that included local tradespeople and craftsmen. Despite achieving several early victories, including promotion to Mesterrækken (now the Jutland Series), the club faced challenges as top players often transferred to stronger regional clubs like Herning Fremad, which led to a quick relegation.

Holstebro Boldklub achieved an early milestone by winning the Jutland junior division championship, featuring future national team players Oluf Skjelmose and Kaj Nielsen. Under chairman Martin Schmidt, Holstebro developed a cohesive internal culture, referred to as the "HB spirit." The club advanced by winning its Mellemrække group and earning promotion to JBU's Mesterskabsrække with a win over Brønderslev, remaining undefeated for 29 consecutive matches during this period.

Holstebro then won the northern division of the Mesterskabsrække and took fourth place in the DBU's promotion series, the second-tier of the Danish football league system, competing with clubs such as HIK and B 1913. The club also won the Jutland Championship with a 3–2 victory over Vejle, attended by 3,000 spectators. Holstebro was recognised among the top clubs in Jutland after winning the "Jutland Cup Tournament," but the outbreak of World War II soon interrupted the season. Despite challenges during the war, the club continued to focus on youth development.

=== Post-War growth and competitive success (1950s–1990s) ===
Holstebro appointed its first professional coach, Axel Larsen, who led them to another northern Mesterskabsrække title, though promotion was not secured. With new coach Carl I. Christensen, Holstebro improved in fitness and performance, achieving promotion to the Danish 4th Division in 1958 after a successful playoff against Herning Fremad. Though they faced subsequent relegations, Holstebro returned briefly to the 4th Division under coach Robert Andreasen.

In 1989, the club opened a new clubhouse, and its team in the Denmark Series (which had replaced the 4th Division in 1966) earned promotion once again. Holstebro reached its highest historical ranking in 1995, placing 5th in the second-tier Danish 1st Division. In 1999, Holstebro Boldklub won the Danish indoor football championship.

=== Modern era and recent achievements (2000s–present) ===
At the turn of the century, Holstebro competed in the third-tier Danish 2nd Division, finishing in the bottom half of the league table during the 1999–2000 season. Results steadily improved the following seasons, with the club finishing fourth in the 2001–02 season. In April 2003, Holstebro became part of the FS MidtVest talent development partnership with FC Midtjylland, which included over 57 clubs. This collaboration aimed to enhance player and coach development, while providing Holstebro members with free access to Midtjylland's home games. Additionally, fringe players from Midtjylland would have opportunities to play for Holstebro in the 2nd Division. In the following years, Holstebro narrowly avoided relegation, and managed to stay in the 2nd Division.

In September 2005, Holstebro faced accusations of match fixing after a 3–2 loss to Næsby in the 2nd Division, marking the first instance of such allegations in Danish football. Significant betting activity raised suspicions, as around 95% of bets were placed on a Næsby victory, leading experts to warn that Danish football is vulnerable to manipulation by Asian betting syndicates. Holstebro denied any wrongdoing, stating that an internal investigation found no evidence of misconduct among players or staff.

On 8 June 2008, Holstebro was relegated from the 2nd Division to the fourth-tier Denmark Series after a 1–0 home loss to Midtjylland's reserves, ending a 19-year tenure in the Danish divisions. The following season, Holstebro earned immediate promotion back to the 2nd Division. In the 2008–09 Danish Cup fourth round, they faced Danish Superliga club Brøndby, narrowly losing 2–1. The match marked the return of former player Bo Hansen, who had played for both clubs, as well as Bolton Wanderers in the Premier League. Retired since 2004 due to injuries, Hansen returned to the pitch for the final 20 minutes of the game.

After ten years away, the club returned to the third-tier Danish 2nd Division in 2020, continuing its presence in the divisions of Danish football.

== Players ==
=== First-team squad ===
As of 1 October 2026

Note: Flags indicate national team as defined under FIFA eligibility rules; some limited exceptions apply. Players may hold more than one non-FIFA nationality.

No.	Pos.	Nation	Player
1	GK	DEN	Mikkel Jahn
1	GK	DEN	Magnus Bjerrum
2	DF	DEN	Lasse Risager
3	DF	DEN	Casper Bæksted
4	MF	DEN	Christoffer Svenningsen
7	FW	PUR	Anders Iversen
8	FW	DEN	Noah Iversen
9	FW	DEN	Anders Rønn Lind
10	MF	DEN	Rasmus Aagaard
11	FW	DEN	August Madsen
12	DF	DEN	Viktor Fisker
14	DF	DEN	Daniel Vester

No.	Pos.	Nation	Player
15	MF	DEN	Emil Kjer
17	MF	DEN	Mads Schmidt Hansen
18	FW	DEN	Nikolaj Houborg
19	DF	DEN	Niklas Øvreås Poulsen
20	GK	DEN	Silas Novrup
21	FW	DEN	Nikolai Klausen
23	FW	DEN	Mikkel Tønnesen
28	FW	DEN	Nikolai Sønderby
31	DF	COD	John Ndjate
35	MF	DEN	Emil Søgård
36	DF	DEN	Okan Avci
37	DF	DEN	Kristian Elkjær

=== Former players ===
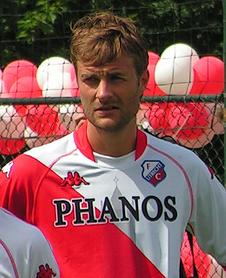
Morten Skoubo (pictured in 2009) played youth football for Holstebro.

Goalkeeper Peer Lauritsen played over 400 matches for the club. Holstebro Boldklub has developed players who later reached top-level Danish and international football, including Jakob Kjeldbjerg (Chelsea), Jens Risager (Brøndby), Bo Hansen (Brøndby, Bolton Wanderers), Kim Kristensen (Midtjylland, Herfølge, Vejle), Claus Bech Jørgensen, Morten Skoubo (Midtjylland, Brøndby, Borussia Mönchengladbach, Real Sociedad), and Søren Krogh (Brøndby).

== Club officials ==
=== Management ===
Position	Name
Chairman	Kåre Madsen
Vice-chairman	Anja Lund
Youth-chairman	Glenn Wiik
Board of directors	Kristian Hedegaard, Ronnie Elbæk, Michael Pedersen
Sports Director	Henrik Christensen

=== Technical staff ===
As of 27 October 2024

Position	Name
Head coach	Kim Kristensen
Assistant manager	Kenneth Birkedal
First-team coach	Arne Linnet
Goalkeeping coach	Morten Jänichen
First-team leader	Jimmi Pedersen
First-team leaders	Frank Lauritsen, Peter 'Futte' Fejerskov; Anders Bojer Jørgensen
Second team coach	Morten Tandrup
