= John Neal (footballer, born 1966) =

English footballer

Personal information
- Full name: John James Neal
- Date of birth: 11 March 1966 (age 60)
- Place of birth: Hornsey, England
- Position: Forward

Youth career
- Millwall

Senior career*
| Years | Team | Apps | (Gls) |
| 1983–1984 | Millwall | 6 | (1) |
| 1985–1986 | Barnet | 8 | (1) |
| 1986 | Hitchin Town | 8 | (2) |
- Walthamstow Avenue
- Basildon United
- Harlow Town
- Dagenham
| 1989–1990 | Barking | | (9) |
- Bishops Stortford
- Saffron Walden Town
- * Club domestic league appearances and goals

John James Neal (born 11 March 1966) is a former professional footballer who played as a forward in the Football League for Millwall.

Neal was born in Hornsey, in the London Borough of Haringey, and played football for England Schoolboys. He then played for the Republic of Ireland in two European Championships at U18 level. He finished top scorer in the competition and went on to play in the 1985 FIFA World Youth Championship.

At club level, he made six appearances in the 1983–84 Football League Third Division for Millwall. He moved on to Barnet, for whom he scored once from eight appearances in the 1985–86 Alliance Premier League. He went on to play non-league football for clubs including Hitchin Town, Walthamstow Avenue, Basildon United, Harlow Town, Dagenham, Barking, Bishops Stortford and Saffron Walden Town.

He finished top scorer in the Vauxhall Opel scoring 23 league goals.
