= Sándor Krizán =

Hungarian footballer

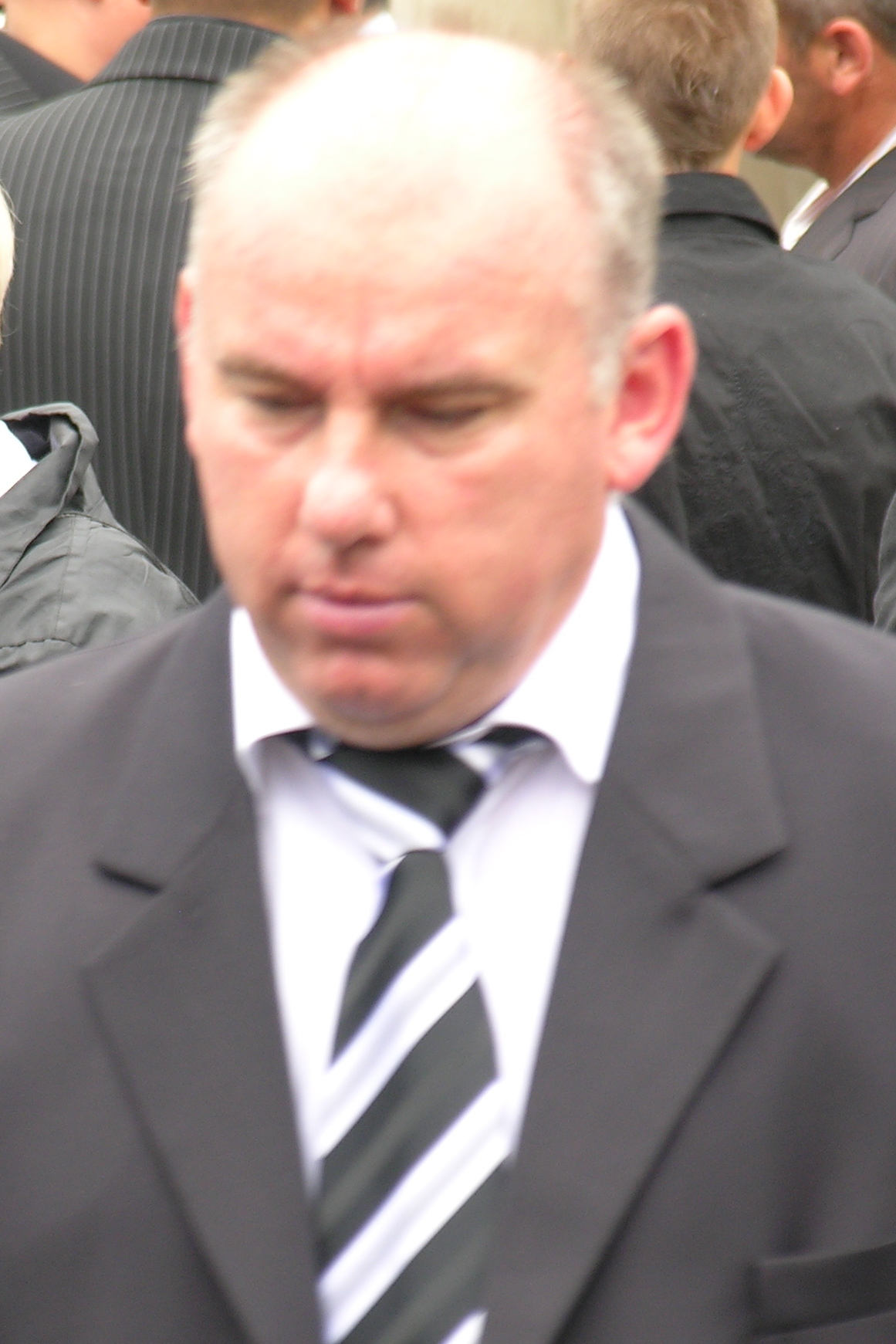

Personal information
- Full name: Sándor Krizán
- Date of birth: 1968 (age 57–58)
- Place of birth: Hungary
- Position: Midfielder

Youth career
- Nyíregyháza Spartacus FC

Senior career*
Years	Team	Apps	(Gls)
1986–1987	Budapest Honvéd FC	2	(0)
1987–1988	Szombathelyi Haladás	9	(0)
1989	Diósgyőri VTK		
1990–1991	OFK Kikinda	9	(0)

International career
1984	Hungary U-18		
- * Club domestic league appearances and goals

Sándor Krizán (born 1968) is a retired Hungarian footballer.

== Club career ==
Krizán was playing with Nyíregyháza Spartacus FC when he played for Hungary at the European youth championship. Later he played with Budapest Honvéd FC and Szombathelyi Haladás in the Nemzeti Bajnokság I, Hungarian top-league. He also played with Diósgyőri VTK in 1989. He had one spell abroad, it was with OFK Kikinda playing in the 1990–91 Yugoslav Second League.

After retiring, he worked as businessman in the private sector, but on August 1, 2013, he returned to football, this time to become sports director of Nyíregyháza Spartacus FC. He was later sports director of second-level side Aqvital FC Csákvár, a post he held until January 1, 2015, when he resigned after receiving an invitation to work within the Hungarian Football Federation.

== International career ==
He played with the Hungarian national U-19 team at the 1984 UEFA European Under-18 Championship becoming part of the generation that won that tournament.

== Honors ==
Hungary U-18

- UEFA European Under-18 Championship: 1984
