= Kelch (surname) =

Kelch is a surname of German-language origin and may have originated from one of the following meanings:

- the nickname "Kelch", which means "double chin" or "goiter" in Middle High German
- "chalice" or "goblet" in German (wikt:Kelch, de:wikt:Kelch)

Notable people with the surname include:

- Alexander Kelch, Russian nobleman
- Jim Kelch, American sports announcer
- Pat Kelch (born 1966), Irish footballer
