= Tomasz Cebula =

Polish footballer (born 1966)

Personal information
- Date of birth: 31 March 1966 (age 60)
- Place of birth: Brzeziny, Poland
- Height: 1.75 m (5 ft 9 in)
- Position: Striker

Senior career*
Years	Team	Apps	(Gls)
1983–1985	Legia Warsaw	26	(1)
1986–1987	Zagłębie Lubin	21	(0)
1987	Legia Warsaw	1	(0)
1987–1989	Igloopol Dębica		
1989–1995	ŁKS Łódź	157	(27)
1995–1996	Hapoel Petah Tikva	27	(3)
1996	ŁKS Łódź	4	(1)
1996–1997	Hapoel Ironi Rishon LeZion	24	(3)
1997–1998	ŁKS Łódź	36	(1)
1998–1999	Śląsk Wrocław		
2000	Siarka Tarnobrzeg		
2000	ŁKS Łódź		
2000–2001	Dolcan Ząbki		
2001–2003	Da Nang		
2004	An Giang		

International career
- Poland U18
1990–1994	Poland	12	(0)
Medal record
Men's football
Representing Poland
UEFA European Under-18 Championship
Third place	1984 Soviet Union
- * Club domestic league appearances and goals

Tomasz Cebula (born 31 March 1966) is a Polish former professional footballer who played as a striker.

Cebula made 12 appearances for the Poland national football team.

== Honours ==
ŁKS Łódź

- Ekstraklasa: 1997–98

Poland U18

- UEFA European Under-18 Championship third place: 1984
