= Gérson da Silva =

Brazilian footballer (1965–1994)

Personal information
- Full name: Gérson Pereira da Silva
- Date of birth: 23 September 1965
- Place of birth: Santos, São Paulo, Brazil
- Date of death: 17 May 1994 (aged 28)
- Place of death: Guarujá, São Paulo, Brazil
- Height: 1.80 m (5 ft 11 in)
- Position: Forward

Senior career*
| Years | Team | Apps | (Gls) |
| 1985 | Santos | 7 | (6) |
| 1985 | Guarani | 10 | (1) |
| 1986–1987 | Paulista | 0 | (0) |
| 1988–1991 | Atlético Mineiro | 56 | (21) |
| 1992–1993 | Internacional | 15 | (6) |

International career
| 1989–1990 | Brazil | 5 | (0) |
Medal record
Representing Brazil
FIFA World Youth Championship
| Gold medal – first place | 1985 Soviet Union |
- * Club domestic league appearances and goals

Gérson Pereira da Silva (September 23, 1965 – May 17, 1994), sometimes known as just Gérson, was a Brazilian footballer who played as a forward.

== Career ==
Gerson da Silva’s talents became evident at age 18, when he was top scorer in the Copa São Paulo de Futebol Júnior 1984 with Santos. Having spent the Guarani de Campinas and Paulista Futebol Clube, became the idol of Atlético Mineiro and Sport Club Internacional, clubs whereby, within 4 years, was three times top scorer of the Copa do Brasil (1989 and 1991 by Atletico, 1992 by Inter), and remains the only player to have hit that mark. In 1991, he helped Atletico to the biggest win of all time in the Brazil Cup: 11–0 in Caiçara Esporte Clube, Campo Maior, Piauí, at Independence Stadium in Belo Horizonte, having scored five goals in this game. At Internacional, where he was known affectionately as "Nego Gerson," he scored a number of beautiful goals and was instrumental in the successful campaigns of the Copa do Brasil of 1992 (when he scored 9 of the team's 18 goals) and Campeonato Gaúcho, won just 10 days after. At the time that the Colorado lifted the Brazilian Cup, the coach Antônio Lopes became aware of the clinical state of Gérson. However, rather than remove him from the group, Lopes kept between holders. The coach confirmed that used the example of basketball player Magic Johnson, gold medal at the 1992 Summer Olympics months before, to motivate his shirt 9. He died in 1994, victim of toxoplasmosis, a few months after leaving to train for health problems related to AIDS. His wife Andréa Felipe Silva confirmed that Gerson died from AIDS and accused Internacional of abandoning him. According to statements from the direction of the Internacional, Gérson was diagnosed with HIV, however the player and his family have always denied. Recently doctors declared that centre forward probably never would have received proper treatment at the time due to the lack of progress in the area, and was apparently upset with the psychological state, possibly due to personal problems or his health, since he never proved to be believer its recovery. For these reasons, the disease could have advanced more quickly.

Gerson managed to win the topscorer award of the Copa do Brasil on three of its five editions (launched in 1989) before retiring in 1993. He scored a total of 166 goals in 291 league games between 1985 and 1993, including the State championships.

== Honours ==
Internacional

- Campeonato Gaúcho: 1992
- Copa do Brasil: 1992

Atlético Mineiro

- Campeonato Mineiro: 1988, 1989

Brazil youth

- FIFA World Youth Championship 1985

Individual

- 1985 FIFA World Youth Championship top scorer: 1985
- Special Division Championship top scorer: 1988 by Paulista Jundiai
- Copa do Brasil top scorer: 1989, 1991, 1992
