= Pál Fischer =

Hungarian footballer

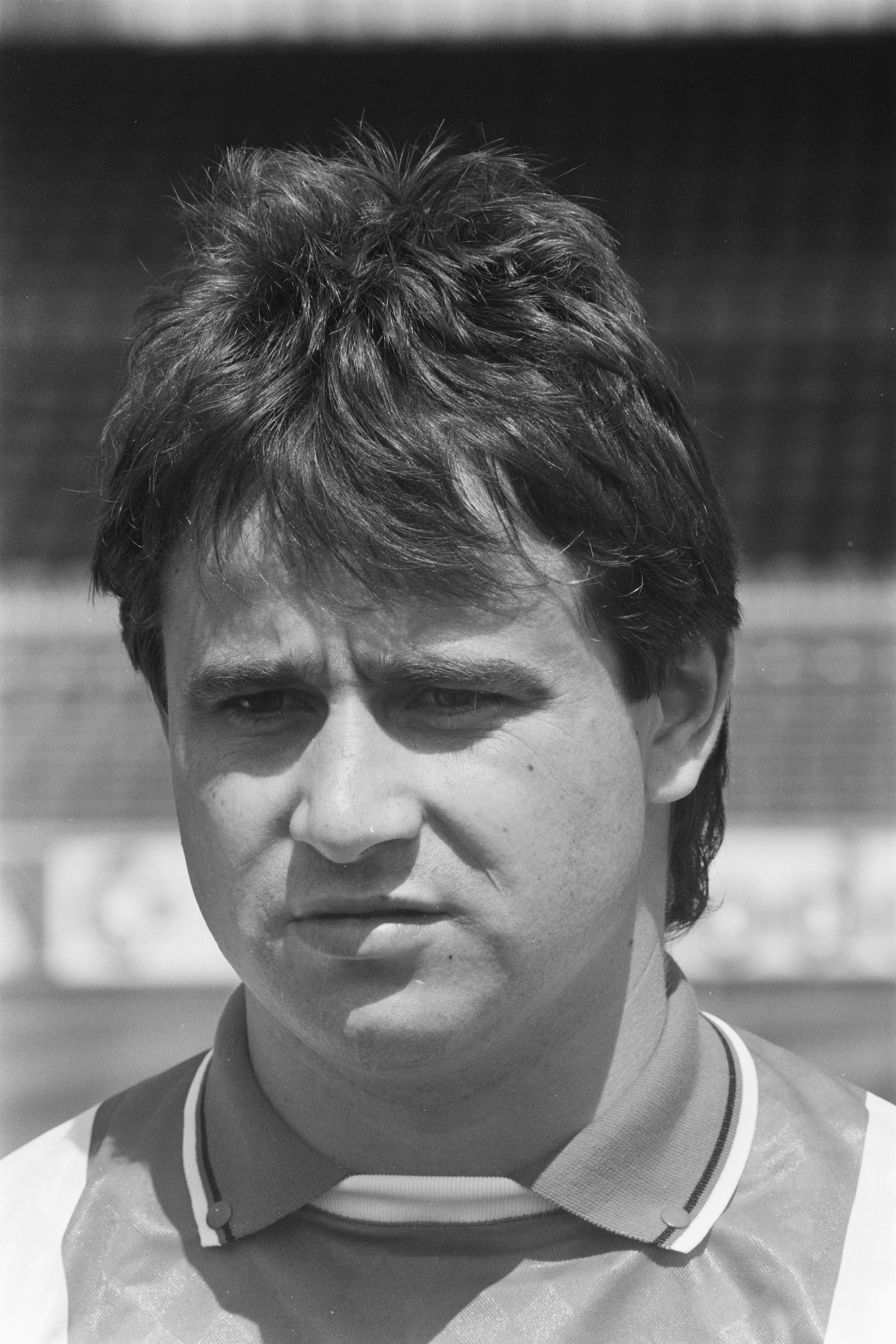
- Fischer in 1989

Personal information
- Date of birth: 29 January 1966 (age 60)
- Place of birth: Budapest, Hungary
- Height: 1.80 m (5 ft 11 in)
- Position: Forward

Youth career
- 1980–1982: Bp. Építők
- 1982–1984: Ferencvaros

Senior career*
Years	Team	Apps	(Gls)
1984–1991	Ferencváros	120	(49)
1989–1990	→ AFC Ajax (loan)	15	(7)
1991–1992	BFC Siófok	30	(16)
1992–1993	Kispest Honvéd	23	(5)
1993–1994	BFC Siófok	22	(8)
1994–1995	Soproni LC	15	(5)
1995–1997	Vasas SC	61	(17)
1997–1998	NK Osijek	11	(4)
1998–1999	BKV Előre	9	(1)
1999–2000	III. Kerületi TUE	16	(4)

International career
1988–1992	Hungary	19	(0)
- * Club domestic league appearances and goals

Pál Fischer (born 29 January 1966) is a Hungarian former professional footballer who played as a forward.

== Club career ==
Fischer was born in Budapest. After playing initially with Ferencváros between 1984 and 1991, he managed to be Hungarian national champion and league top scorer in 1992, a year after returning from a year-long loan at Ajax where he was already Dutch Eredivisie champion in 1990. After this successful period he moved to BFC Siófok but after a year he signed with Kispest Honvéd where he was Hungarian champion again in 1993. Afterwards he returned to BFC Siofók in 1993, joined Soproni LC in 1994 before moving to Vasas SC in 1995 where he settled for two seasons. In 1997, he emigrated again, this time to play with Prva HNL club NK Osijek. After one season in Croatia he returned to Hungary and played with BKV Előre SC, III. Kerületi TUE and Magyargéc before retiring in 2003.

== International career ==
Fischer was part of the Hungary team that participated in the 1985 FIFA World Youth Championship. He was part of the Hungary national team and played a total of 19 matches from 1988 until 1992.

== Honours ==
Ajax

- Eredivisie: 1989–90

Ferencváros

- Magyar Kupa: 1990–91

Honvéd Budapest

- Nemzeti Bajnokság I: 1992–93

Individual

- Nemzeti Bajnokság I top goalscorer: 1991–92 (16 goals, together with Ferenc Orosz)
