= Luciano (footballer, born 1965) =

Brazilian footballer

Personal information
- Full name: Sebastião Carlos Luciano
- Date of birth: 13 October 1965 (age 61)
- Place of birth: Bauru, Brazil
- Height: 1.83 m (6 ft 0 in)
- Position: Right back

Youth career
- –1985: Matsubara

Senior career*
Years	Team	Apps	(Gls)
1985–1990	Portuguesa	177	(0)
1990	Guarani		
1991–1992	Inter de Limeira		
1992	União São João		
1993	Atlético Mineiro	28	(0)
1994	Santos		
1994–1995	XV de Jaú		

International career
1985	Brazil U20		
- * Club domestic league appearances and goals as of 4 October 2024

Sebastião Carlos Luciano (born 13 October 1965), simply known as Luciano, is a Brazilian former professional footballer who played as a right back.

== Career ==
Revealed by Matsubara-PR, Luciano arrived at Portuguesa in 1985. He was South American and World Champion with the Brazil under-20 team and a member of the Portuguesa side from 1985 to 1990, making 177 appearances. He also played for other teams in the São Paulo countryside and for Atlético Mineiro in 1993, where he played 28 matches.

== Honours ==
Brazil U20

- FIFA U-20 World Cup: 1985
- South American U-20 Championship: 1985
