= Pat Kelch =

Irish footballer

Personal information
- Date of birth: 5 May 1966 (age 60)
- Place of birth: Dublin, Ireland
- Position: Full back

Youth career
- 1974–1983: Cambridge Boys
- 1983–1984: Manchester United
- 1985: Bradford City

Senior career*
Years	Team	Apps	(Gls)
1985–1986	Home Farm	16	(1)
1986–1987	Athlone Town	10	(1)
1987–1993	St Patrick's Athletic	?	(?)
1993–1994	Bohemians	7	(0)
- * Club domestic league appearances and goals

Pat Kelch (born 5 May 1966) was an Irish soccer player.

== Career ==
Kelch was a defender who started out with local side Cambridge Boys who he captained to the All-Ireland SFAI Barry Cup Final in 1982. He played for St Patrick's Athletic and Bohemians amongst others during his career in the League of Ireland. He began his career at Manchester United where his teammates in the youth team included David Platt. Kelch played in a full strength United side in a testimonial for Ian Botham in December 1984. However, he never made the breakthrough to the first team and returned to Ireland. A solid full back, he signed for Bohs in August 1993.

Kelch played for the Republic of Ireland national under-19 football team in the 1984 UEFA European Under-18 Football Championship finals in the Soviet Union and scored against Portugal as Ireland won 3-2 . As a Bradford player he played and scored in the 1985 FIFA World Youth Championship .

He was a part of the "All Stars", a best League XI in 1992.

Kelch made his League of Ireland debut for Home Farm on 20 October 1985. After one season he moved to Athlone Town A.F.C. In September 1990 he made 2 appearances against Dinamo Bucharest in the European Cup.
