= Philip Priest =

English footballer (born 1966)

Personal information
- Full name: Philip Priest
- Date of birth: 6 September 1966 (age 60)
- Place of birth: Warley, Essex, England
- Height: 5 ft 7 in (1.70 m)
- Position: Midfielder

Youth career
- Chelsea

Senior career*
Years	Team	Apps	(Gls)
1985–1987	Chelsea	0	(0)
1986	→ Blackpool (loan)	1	(0)
1987	→ Brentford (loan)	5	(1)
1987–1990	Shrewsbury Town	60	(3)

International career
1983–1984	England U17	10	(5)
1984	England Youth	6	(1)
1985	England U20	3	(1)
- * Club domestic league appearances and goals

Philip Priest (born 9 September 1966) is an English former professional footballer who played as a midfielder.

== Career ==
Priest played for Chelsea, Blackpool, Brentford and Shrewsbury Town.

He also participated at the 1985 FIFA World Youth Championship.
