= Balalo =

Brazilian footballer

Personal information
- Full name: Luís Carlos da Silva Maciel
- Date of birth: 17 August 1965 (age 61)
- Place of birth: Uruguaiana, Brazil
- Position: Midfielder

Youth career
- 1980–1984: Internacional

Senior career*
Years	Team	Apps	(Gls)
1985–1988	Internacional		
1988	Sport Recife		
1989	Caxias		
1990	Novo Hamburgo		
1990	Internacional		
1990–1993	Gaziantepspor		
1994	Novo Hamburgo		
1994–1998	15 de Novembro		
1999	Inter de Limeira		
1999	Novo Hamburgo		
2000	Sapiranga		
2001	Ulbra		
2004	Garibaldi		

International career
1985	Brazil U20		
- * Club domestic league appearances and goals as of 24 February 2024

Luís Carlos da Silva Maciel (born 17 August 1965), better known as Balalo, is a Brazilian former professional footballer who played as a midfielder.

== Career ==
A great highlight of Internacional, champion in all youth categories for the club, Balalo was part of the Brazilian under-20 champion team in 1985. In 1986 he was top scorer in the state championship with 14 goals, but did not win titles in the professional category.

== Honours ==
Brazil

- FIFA U-20 World Cup: 1985

Individual

- 1986 Campeonato Gaúcho top scorer: 14 goals
