= Kenneth Birkedal =

Danish footballer (born 1965)

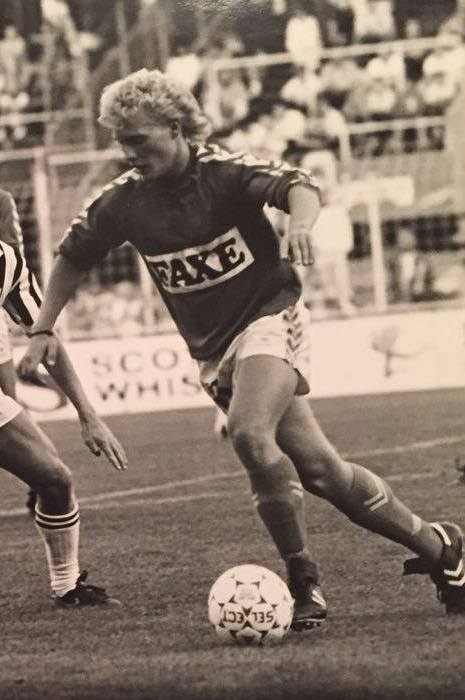
- Birkedal playing for BK Frem in 1986

Personal information
- Full name: Kenneth Birkedal
- Date of birth: 19 November 1965 (age 60)
- Place of birth: Copenhagen, Denmark
- Position: Midfielder

Team information
- Current team: Holstebro (assistant)

Youth career
- 1976–1979: Sylvia
- 1980–1983: BK Frem

Senior career*
Years	Team	Apps	(Gls)
1984–1986	BK Frem	90	(12)
1987	B 1903		
1988–1991	BK Frem	108	(4)
1991–1992	B 1903	31	
1992	Copenhagen	5	(0)
1993	BK Frem	18	(1)
1993–1994	Herfølge	30	(1)
1994–1996	BK Frem	66	(14)
1997–1998	Holstebro	30	(2)

International career
1982–1984	Denmark U19	29	(3)

Managerial career
- 2000–?: Måbjerg IF
- 2021–: Holstebro (assistant)
- * Club domestic league appearances and goals

Kenneth Birkedal (born 19 November 1965) is a Danish football coach and former professional footballer who is assistant manager of Danish 3rd Division club Holstebro.

== Coaching career ==
Birkedal has held various coaching roles since retiring from professional football. After initially playing for Holstebro's first team upon moving to the town, he transitioned into coaching. He served as a head coach of Måbjerg IF before becoming an assistant coach for Holstebro's first team. He later coached FS Holstebro's U17 team for five years, working alongside his son. In 2021, Birkedal returned to Holstebro as an assistant coach for the first team competing in the Danish 3rd Division.

== Personal life ==
After ending his football career in 1996, Birkedal moved from his hometown Copenhagen to Holstebro to open an acupuncture clinic, Birkedal Akupunktur & Massage, where he treats patients for various conditions, including sports injuries, pain, and allergies. Trained as a reflexologist and acupuncturist, he now focuses on helping clients with techniques that include acupuncture.

Birkedal lives in Holstebro with his wife, Karin, a pedagogue, and their three children.
