= Wasiu Ipaye =

Nigerian footballer

Personal information
- Date of birth: 6 July 1968 (age 58)

International career
Years	Team	Apps	(Gls)
1989–1995	Nigeria	3	(0)

Wasiu Ipaye (born 6 July 1968) is a Nigerian footballer. He played in three matches for the Nigeria national football team from 1989 to 1995. He was also named in Nigeria's squad for the 1990 African Cup of Nations tournament.
