= Mourad Gharbi =

Tunisian footballer

Personal information
- Date of birth: 21 January 1966 (age 60)

International career
Years	Team	Apps	(Gls)
1987–1994	Tunisia	24	(0)

Mourad Gharbi (born 21 January 1966) is a Tunisian footballer. He played as a midfielder in 24 matches for the Tunisia national football team from 1987 to 1994. He was also named in Tunisia's squad for the 1994 African Cup of Nations tournament.
