= Jorge Ferreira (footballer) =

Portuguese footballer

Personal information
- Full name: Jorge da Costa Ferreira
- Date of birth: 18 March 1966 (age 60)
- Place of birth: Benguela, Angola
- Height: 1.77 m (5 ft 10 in)
- Position: Centre back

Youth career
- 1980–1981: GDR Portugal
- 1981–1982: Galitos
- 1982–1985: Barreirense

Senior career*
| Years | Team | Apps | (Gls) |
| 1985–1988 | Barreirense | | |
| 1988–1992 | Vitória Setúbal | 140 | (1) |
| 1992–1996 | Braga | 115 | (2) |
| 1996–1999 | Campomaiorense | 82 | (0) |
| 1999–2000 | União Madeira | 33 | (1) |
| 2000–2004 | Alcochetense | | |
| 2004–2008 | Quintajense | | |
| Total | | 370 | (4) |

International career
| 1984 | Portugal U18 | 5 | (0) |
| 1987–1989 | Portugal U21 | 3 | (0) |
| 1989–1990 | Portugal | 4 | (0) |

Managerial career
- 2009–2011: Barreirense (assistant)
- * Club domestic league appearances and goals

Jorge da Costa Ferreira (born 18 March 1966 in Benguela, Portuguese Angola) is a Portuguese retired footballer who played as a central defender.
