= Isidoro Aquino =

Paraguayan footballer (born 1966)

Personal information
- Full name: Isidoro Aquino Díaz
- Date of birth: 4 April 1966 (age 60)
- Place of birth: Luque, Paraguay
- Height: 1.83 m (6 ft 0 in)
- Position: Central defender

Senior career*
Years	Team	Apps	(Gls)
1983-1985	Sportivo Luqueño	4	(0)
1985-1987	Tigres UANL	22	(4)
1987	Cerro Porteño		
1988-2002	Sportivo Luqueño		

International career
1985	Paraguay	1	(0)
- * Club domestic league appearances and goals

Isidoro Aquino Díaz (born 4 April 1966) is a Paraguayan former footballer who played as a central defender for Sportivo Luqueño and the Paraguay national team.
