= Gong Lei (footballer) =

Chinese footballer, manager, and media pundit

Gong Lei 宫磊
Personal information
- Full name: Gong Lei
- Date of birth: 15 October 1965 (age 61)
- Place of birth: Beijing, China
- Height: 1.77 m (5 ft 10 in)
- Position: Midfielder

Youth career
- 1980–1983: Beijing Team

Senior career*
Years	Team	Apps	(Gls)
1984–1989	Beijing Team		
1990–1996	AS Pirae		
1997	Toronto Lynx	22	(2)
1997–1998	South China		
1998	Toronto Olympians	14	(17)
1999–2001	Beijing Kuanli		

International career
1983–1986	China U-20	4	(2)
1993–1995	Tahiti	2	(1)

Managerial career
- 2003: Gansu Tianma
- 2007–2009: Shaanxi Chanba (assistant)
- 2009: Shaanxi Zhongjian (caretaker)
- 2010–2012: Guizhou Renhe (assistant)
- 2012–2014: Guizhou Renhe (caretaker)
- 2015: Guizhou Renhe
- 2016: Jiangsu Suning (team manager)
- 2017–2018: Chongqing Dangdai Lifan (general manager)
- 2024–2025: Guangxi Lanhang
Medal record
Men's football
Representing China
AFC Youth Championship
Gold medal – first place	1985 Abu Dhabi	Team
- * Club domestic league appearances and goals

Gong Lei (Chinese: 宫磊; born 15 October 1965) is a Chinese football manager and former player as well as media pundit.

As a player, he represented Beijing Team, AS Pirae, Toronto Lynx, South China, Toronto Olympians and Beijing Kuanli before he retired and moved into coaching. His first coaching position would be with Gansu Tianma F.C. where he had a short spell with them before becoming an assistant at Shaanxi Zhongjian. He would manage Chinese Super League side Guizhou Renhe where he won the 2013 Chinese FA Cup.

== Playing career ==
As a youth player Gong Lei was considered a promising youngster and was part of the Beijing Football Team that won the 1984 Chinese Jia-A League title.

After several seasons with Beijing, Gong then went abroad to Tahiti and joined AS Pirae, where he experienced significant success by winning several league and cup titles with them. He was nominated for FIFA World Player of the Year in 1993 and is the only Chinese footballer to be nominated for this award. He placed in joint-twenty-second, alongside international stars such as Lothar Matthäus, Jürgen Kohler and Tomas Brolin, among others, with five points.

Nearing the end of his career, he then spent a short time with Canadian club Toronto Lynx, Hong Kong team South China, Toronto Olympians and Beijing Kuanli before he retired.

== International career ==
=== China youth ===
His form with Beijing saw him called up to the Chinese U-20 team squad that took part in the 1985 FIFA World Youth Championship, where China were knocked out in the quarter-finals on 1 September 1985 by the Soviet Union.

=== Tahiti ===
After living in Tahiti for three years, he was naturalized in 1993, going on to score for Tahiti in the final of the 1993 South Pacific Mini Games, in a 3–0 win against Fiji.

== Managerial career ==
Gong became a football commentator and pundit in 2002, providing analysis to CCTV sports channel for La Liga before he gained his first Head coaching position with second-tier Chinese club Gansu Tianma F.C. before the start of the 2003 league season. The club had high expectations for the season after they brought in English international Paul Gascoigne into the team, however Gong lost his influential marquee player after the club's owners had a dispute with the player over wages. This saw results decline and the club's owners decided to move to Ningbo, rename themselves Ningbo Yaoma while ending the campaign in a disappointing 11th-place finish before Gong left the team.

After several years out of management Gong returned as an assistant coach to top tier club Shaanxi Chanba in 2007 before becoming the caretaker manager after the club's manager Cheng Yaodong resigned from the team. Gong's return to Head coaching was brief and Zhu Guanghu was soon brought in while he returned to his assistant duties. Gong would work with several further managers and stayed with the club as they moved to Guizhou and renamed themselves Guizhou Renhe before the owners asked him to be the caretaker manager once again while the club looked for a new manager before the start of the 2013 league campaign. The club did not bring anyone in before the start of the season and results under Gong improved over the course of the campaign, which resulted him guiding the club to their first ever Chinese FA Cup when they beat Guangzhou Evergrande F.C. in the 2013 Chinese FA Cup final.

On 3 June 2016, Gong Lei was named as vice-president of Suning Sports which its parent company, Suning Holdings Group, acquired a controlling stake in Inter Milan. In 2024, he was named the manager for Guangxi Lanhang in the China League Two. His contract with Guangxi Lanhang was terminated on 1 May 2025.

== Personal life ==
Gong's two sons, Haolun (born 1997) and Haoren (born 2009) are also footballers, with Haoren currently playing in the academy of Beijing Guoan.

== Honours ==
=== Player ===
==== Club ====
Beijing Team

- Chinese Jia-A League: 1984
- FA Cup: 1985

AS Pirae

- Tahiti Division Fédérale: 1991, 1993, 1994
- Tahiti Coupe des: 1996
- Tahiti Cup: 1994, 1996
- Coupe de Polynésie: 1994, 1996

Toronto Olympians

- Open Canada Cup: 1998
- Canadian Professional Soccer League Regular Season: 1998

==== International ====
China U-20 national football team

- AFC U-19 Championship: 1985

==== Individual ====
- Tahiti Division Fédérale Golden Boot awardee: 1994, 1995
- Tahiti Division Fédérale Player of the Year: 1994, 1995

=== Manager ===
Guizhou Renhe

- Chinese FA Cup: 2013
