= Sung Lin Yung =

Chinese footballer

Personal information
- Full name: Song Lianyong (China PR); Sung Lin Yung Stephen (Hong Kong)
- Date of birth: 7 May 1965 (age 61)
- Place of birth: Tianjin, China PR
- Height: 1.82 m (6 ft 0 in)
- Positions: Defender; midfielder; striker

Youth career
- 1983: Tianjin II

Senior career*
Years	Team	Apps	(Gls)
1984–1993	Tianjin		
1993–1998	South China	87	(7)
1998–1999	Sing Tao	25	(7)
1999–2000	Instant-Dict	23	(3)

International career
1985	China U-21	7	(1)
1987	China	1	(0)
1997–1998	Hong Kong		
- * Club domestic league appearances and goals as of 13:06, 7 May 2010 (UTC)

Sung Lin Yung
- Traditional Chinese: 宋連勇
- Simplified Chinese: 宋连勇
Transcriptions
Standard Mandarin
- Hanyu Pinyin: Song Lianyong

Stephen Sung Lin Yung (born 7 May 1965 in Tianjin) is a retired football player who represented the Hong Kong football team. Starting his career in China he played for the Chinese U-20 and the Chinese Olympic team before he established himself with Chinese top-tier side Tianjin where he played as a forward. Moving away from China he joined Hong Kong football team South China and became their utility player playing anywhere on the field, though he spent most of time as a defensive midfielder where he had a successful time with them winning several cups and the 1996–97 Hong Kong First Division League title with them.

== International career ==
Sung would then become a Hong Kong permanent resident before he played for the Hong Kong national team and played a major role in Hong Kong's World Cup Qualifiers in 1997. By 1998, he moved to other Hong Kong football teams Sing Tao and then Instant-Dict as well as represented Hong Kong during the 1998 Asian Games football event before he retired.

== Honours ==
South China AA

- Hong Kong First Division League: 1996–97
- Hong Kong Senior Shield: 1995–96, 1996–97
- Hong Kong Viceroy Cup: 1993–94, 1997–98
- Hong Kong FA Cup: 1995–96
