= Héctor Becerra =

Mexican footballer and manager (born 1965)

Personal information
- Full name: Héctor Becerra Becerra
- Date of birth: 10 May 1965 (age 61)
- Place of birth: Monterrey, Nuevo León, Mexico
- Height: 1.78 m (5 ft 10 in)
- Position: Winger

Youth career
- Monterrey

Senior career*
Years	Team	Apps	(Gls)
1984–1992	Monterrey	167	(20)
1992–1993	UAT	26	(0)
1993–1996	Monterrey La Raza		

International career
1988–1989	Mexico	2	(0)

Managerial career
- 2002–2015: Monterrey (Assistant)
- 2015–2017: Monterrey Reserves and Academy
- 2018–2021: Monterrey (women)
- 2021–2023: Raya2 (Assistant)
- 2022: Raya2 (Interim)
- * Club domestic league appearances and goals

Héctor Becerra (born May 10, 1965) is a Mexican football manager and former player.
