= Oleg Kuzhlev =

Russian footballer

Personal information
- Full name: Oleg Borisovich Kuzhlev
- Date of birth: 12 August 1966 (age 60)
- Place of birth: Krasnoyarsk, Russian SFSR
- Height: 1.75 m (5 ft 9 in)
- Position: Midfielder

Youth career
- ShISP Leningrad

Senior career*
Years	Team	Apps	(Gls)
1983–1989	Spartak Moscow	39	(1)
1989	Dynamo Moscow	0	(0)
1989	Lokomotiv Moscow	2	(0)
1990	Spartak Moscow	0	(0)
1990–1991	Žilina		
1991–1992	Spartak Moscow	5	(0)
1992–1993	Étoile Sahel	12	(9)
1993–1994	Tekhinvest-M Moskovsky	40	(1)
1994	Samotlor-XXI Nizhnevartovsk	7	(1)
1995	Moskovsky-Selyatino Selyatino	31	(7)
1995–1996	Shanghai The 9		
1997	Gigant Voskresensk	27	(20)
1998	Kolomna	33	(3)
1999	Moskabelmet Moscow		
2000	Dinamo Brest	5	(3)
2001	Titan Reutov	17	(2)
2002	Oka Stupino		
2008	Korston Moscow		

Managerial career
- 2003–2007: Spartak Moscow (youth teams)
- * Club domestic league appearances and goals

Oleg Borisovich Kuzhlev (Russian: Олег Борисович Кужлев; born 12 August 1966) is a Russian professional football coach and a former player.

== Club career ==
He made his professional debut in the Soviet Top League in 1983 for FC Spartak Moscow.

He played 1 game for the main FC Dynamo Moscow squad in the USSR Federation Cup.

== Personal life ==
His son Oleg Olegovich Kuzhlev also played football professionally.

== Honours ==
- Soviet Top League champion: 1987.
- Soviet Top League runner-up: 1983, 1984, 1985.
- Soviet Top League bronze: 1986.
- Soviet Cup winner: 1992.
- Russian Premier League champion: 1992.

== European club competitions ==
With FC Spartak Moscow.

- UEFA Cup 1986–87: 4 games, 1 goal.
- European Cup 1988–89: 2 games.
- European Cup Winners' Cup 1992–93: 1 game.
