= József Zvara =

Hungarian footballer

Personal information
- Date of birth: 17 August 1966 (age 60)
- Place of birth: Vác, Hungarian People's Republic
- Position: Midfielder

Youth career
- 1983: Vác FC
- 1983–1984: Vasas SC

Senior career*
Years	Team	Apps	(Gls)
1984–1987	Vasas SC	40	(4)
1987–1988	Vàc FC	13	(2)
1988–1994	Vasas SC	122	(18)
1994–1996	Vàc FC	13	(1)
1996–1997	FC Hatvan	16	(3)

International career
1992	Hungary	2	(0)
- * Club domestic league appearances and goals

József Zvara (17 August 1966) is a former Hungarian professional footballer who played as a forward. He was a member of the Hungary national team.

== Career ==
He started his football career at Vác FC. From there he moved to Vasas SC, where he made his debut in the top flight in 1984. In 1988 he played again for a short time for Vác FC, before returning to Angyalföld, Vasas. From 1994 he played for Vác FC again. Between 1996 and 1997 he retired from active football with FC Hatvan.

=== National team ===
In 1992 he played twice for the national team.

== Honours ==
- UEFA European Under-19 Championship
  - Gold medal: 1984, Soviet Union
- Magyar Kupa (MNK)
  - Winner: 1986
