= Soso Chedia =

Georgian footballer (born 1965)

Personal information
- Full name: Bessarion Chedia
- Date of birth: 9 October 1965 (age 61)
- Place of birth: Chitatskari, near Zugdidi, Georgian SSR
- Height: 1.82 m (6 ft 0 in)
- Position: Defender

Youth career
- Dinamo Zugdidi

Senior career*
Years	Team	Apps	(Gls)
1982	Guria Lanchkhuti	21	(0)
1983–1990	Dinamo Tbilisi	180	(5)
1991–1992	GIF Sundsvall	13	(0)
1993–1996	Olympiakos Nicosia	42	(2)
1996	KAMAZ-Chally Naberezhnye Chelny	8	(0)
1996–1997	Odishi Zugdidi	24	(0)
1997–1998	Groclin Dyskobolia Grodzisk	1	(0)

International career
1992	Georgia	1	(0)

Managerial career
- 2009: Olympiacos (assistant)
- 2015–2016: APOEL (assistant)
- 2016: AEK Athens (assistant)
- 2017: FC Orenburg (assistant)
- * Club domestic league appearances and goals

Bessarion "Soso" Chedia (Georgian: ბესარიონ (სოსო) ჭედია; born 9 October 1965) is a Georgian professional football coach and former player. He made one appearance for the Georgia national team and spent most of his club career in Georgia and Europe.

== Playing career ==
Chedia made his professional debut in the Soviet First League in 1982 for Guria Lanchkhuti. He soon moved to Dinamo Tbilisi, where he played from 1983 to 1990, making over 180 league appearances and scoring five goals.

Following the collapse of the Soviet Union, Chedia continued his career abroad. He played for GIF Sundsvall in Sweden (1991–1992), Olympiakos Nicosia in Cyprus (1993–1996), and later had shorter spells with KAMAZ Naberezhnye Chelny, Odishi Zugdidi, and Groclin Dyskobolia Grodzisk.

At international level, he earned one cap for the Georgia national team in 1992.

== Coaching career ==
After retiring from playing, Chedia worked primarily as an assistant coach. His coaching roles include:

- Assistant coach at Olympiacos FC (2009)
- Assistant coach at APOEL FC (2015–2016)
- Assistant coach at AEK Athens FC (2016)
- Assistant coach at FC Orenburg (2017)

== Honours ==
- Umaglesi Liga: 1990
