= Henrique (footballer, born 1966) =

Brazilian footballer

Personal information
- Full name: Henrique Arlindo Etges
- Date of birth: 15 March 1966 (age 60)
- Place of birth: Venâncio Aires, Brazil
- Height: 1.80 m (5 ft 11 in)
- Position: Defender

Senior career*
Years	Team	Apps	(Gls)
1985–1988	Grêmio		
1988–1991	Portuguesa Desportos		
1991–1992	União São João		
1992–1997	Corinthians Paulista		
1998	Verdy Kawasaki		
- * Club domestic league appearances and goals

Henrique Arlindo Etges (born 15 March 1966) is a former Brazilian footballer.

== Career statistics ==
Appearances and goals by club, season and competition
Club	Season	League			Emperor's Cup		J.League Cup		Total	
Club	Season	Division	Apps	Goals	Apps	Goals	Apps	Goals	Apps	Goals
Verdy Kawasaki	1998	J1 League	20	0	0	0	3	0	23	0
Career total			20	0	0	0	3	0	23	0
