= János Zsinka =

Hungarian footballer

Personal information
- Date of birth: 2 October 1965 (age 61)
- Place of birth: Szentendre, Hungarian People's Republic
- Height: 1.70 m (5 ft 7 in)
- Position: Forward

Youth career
- 1976–1981: Dunaújváros FC (1952)

Senior career*
Years	Team	Apps	(Gls)
1982–1983	Fehérvár	13	(1)
1983–1984	Volán	15	(2)
1984–1988	Ferencváros	80	(5)
1988–1989	Dunaújváros FC (1952)	24	(5)
1989	Budapest Honvéd	3	(0)
1989–1990	Békéscsaba 1912 Előre	20	(3)
1990–1992	Újpest	29	(6)
1993	Vác FC	7	(1)
1993–1994	Lourinhanense	29	(13)
1994–1996	Espinho	5	(0)
1996–1997	Soroksári TE	18	(3)

International career
1989	Hungary	1	(0)
- * Club domestic league appearances and goals

János Zsinka (born 2 October 1965) is a Hungarian former professional footballer who played as a forward. He made one appearance for the Hungary national team.

== Club career ==
Zsinka played for Ferencváros from 1984 to 1989 and for Újpest from 1990 to 1993, where he was a member of the 1992 Hungarian Cup winning team.

After 1993 he played one season for Lourinhanense and two seasons for Espinho in Portugal. He then played for Soroksár SC, where he finished his active sports career.

== International career ==
Zsinka made one appearance for the Hungary national team in 1989.

== Honours ==
- Nemzeti Bajnokság I: runner-up 1988–89, 1992–93
- Magyar Kupa: 1992; runner-up 1986
- UEFA European Under-19 Championship: gold medal 1984
