= 1984 UEFA European Under-18 Championship =

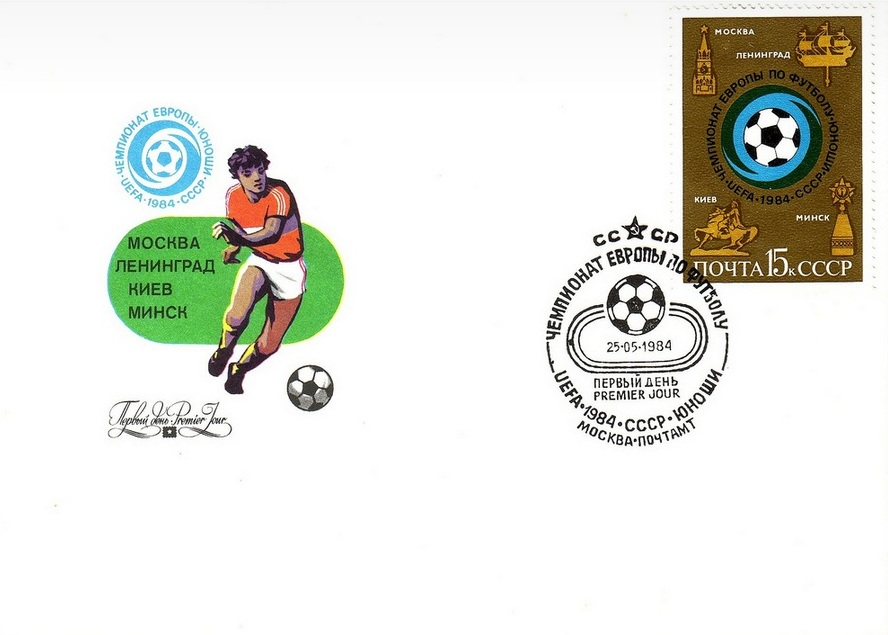
- Cover of the Soviet Union

Tournament details
- Host country: Soviet Union
- Dates: 25 May – 3 June
- Teams: 16

Final positions
- Champions: Hungary (3rd title)
- Runners-up: Soviet Union
- Third place: Poland
- Fourth place: Republic of Ireland

Tournament statistics
- Matches played: 28
- Goals scored: 69 (2.46 per match)

The UEFA European Under-18 Championship 1984 Final Tournament was held in the Soviet Union. It also served as the European qualification for the 1985 FIFA World Youth Championship.

== Qualification ==
=== Group 8 ===
Teams	Pld	W	D	L	GF	GA	GD	Pts
Italy	4	2	2	0	5	0	+5	6
West Germany	4	1	2	1	2	4	–2	4
Austria	4	0	2	2	1	4	–3	2

Austria	0–2	Italy

23 November 1983

West Germany	1 – 1	Austria
Häßler 44'		48' Johann Puchegger

Augsburg

Italy	3–0	West Germany
West Germany	0–0	Italy
Italy	0–0	Austria
Austria	0–1	West Germany

=== Other Groups ===
Team 1	Agg.	Team 2	1st leg	2nd leg
Republic of Ireland	3–1	Northern Ireland	3–0	0–1
Wales	2–8	Scotland	2–4	0–4
Iceland	0–6	England	0–3	0–3
Norway	0–2	Poland	0–2	0–0
Finland	2–3	Denmark	2–2	0–1
East Germany	5–2	Sweden	3–1	2–1
Malta	0–5	Switzerland	0–2	0–3
Luxembourg	4–2	Netherlands	1–2	~~0–1~~ 3–0^{1}
Portugal	4–2	Belgium	4–0	0–2
France	2–3	Spain	1–0	1–3
Czechoslovakia	3–0	Cyprus	3–0	0–0
Greece	(a)3–3	Yugoslavia	1–1	2–2
Hungary	3–0	Romania	1–0	2–0
Turkey	3–3 (4–5p)	Bulgaria	1–2	2–1

^{1}The match Netherlands - Luxembourg at IJmuiden ended 1–0 but was awarded 0–3 to Luxembourg due to fireworks thrown on the field, injuring the Luxembourg keeper.

27 September 1983

Finland	2 – 2	Denmark
Aaltonen 73'; Lius 79'		46' Birkedal; 51' Carsten Pedersen

Tapiolan urheilupuisto, Espoo
Referee: Kjell Johansson (Sweden)

24 March 1984

Turkey	1 – 2	Bulgaria
Hakan Çarkacı 20'		40', 55' Kirov

İnönü Stadium, Istanbul
Referee: Lajos Németh (Hungary)
7 April 1984

Bulgaria	1 – 2	Turkey
Penalties
	5 – 4

Vasil Levski Stadium, Sofia
Referee: Andrzej Libich (Poland)

== Teams ==
The following teams qualified for the tournament:

- Bulgaria
- Czechoslovakia
- Denmark
- East Germany
- England
- Greece
- Hungary
- Italy
- Luxembourg
- Poland
- Portugal
- Republic of Ireland
- Scotland
- Soviet Union (host)
- Spain
- Switzerland

== Group stage ==
=== Group A ===
Teams	Pld	W	D	L	GF	GA	GD	Pts
Republic of Ireland	3	2	1	0	7	3	+4	5
Scotland	3	1	1	1	4	5	–1	3
Portugal	3	1	0	2	6	7	–1	2
Greece	3	0	2	1	3	5	–2	2

25 May	Republic of Ireland	3–0	Scotland
	Greece	1–3	Portugal
27 May	Republic of Ireland	1–1	Greece
	Scotland	3–1	Portugal
29 May	Republic of Ireland	3–2	Portugal
	Scotland	1–1	Greece

=== Group B ===
Teams	Pld	W	D	L	GF	GA	GD	Pts
Poland	3	3	0	0	3	0	+3	6
Bulgaria	3	1	1	1	3	3	0	3
Italy	3	1	0	2	3	2	+1	2
Denmark	3	0	1	2	2	6	–4	1

25 May	Bulgaria	2–2	Denmark
	Poland	1–0	Italy
27 May	Bulgaria	0–1	Poland
	Denmark	0–3	Italy
29 May	Bulgaria	1–0	Italy
	Denmark	0–1	Poland

=== Group C ===
Teams	Pld	W	D	L	GF	GA	GD	Pts
Soviet Union	3	2	1	0	7	1	+6	5
England	3	1	2	0	4	2	+2	4
East Germany	3	1	1	1	5	2	+3	3
Luxembourg	3	0	0	3	0	11	–11	0

25 May	England	1–1	East Germany
	Soviet Union	5–0	Luxembourg
27 May	England	1–1	Soviet Union
	East Germany	4–0	Luxembourg
29 May	England	2–0	Luxembourg
	East Germany	0–1	Soviet Union

=== Group D ===
Teams	Pld	W	D	L	GF	GA	GD	Pts
Hungary	3	3	0	0	6	0	+6	6
Spain	3	1	1	1	3	4	–1	3
Czechoslovakia	3	1	1	1	3	5	–2	3
Switzerland	3	0	0	3	2	5	–3	0

25 May	Czechoslovakia	0–3	Hungary
	Switzerland	1–2	Spain
27 May	Czechoslovakia	2–1	Switzerland
	Hungary	2–0	Spain
29 May	Czechoslovakia	1–1	Spain
	Hungary	1–0	Switzerland

== Semifinals ==
1 June 1984

Republic of Ireland	1 – 2	Soviet Union

Dynamo Stadium, Moscow
1 June 1984

Poland	0 – 2	Hungary

Torpedo Stadium, Moscow

== Third place match ==
3 June 1984

Poland	2 – 1	Republic of Ireland

Central Lenin Stadium, Moscow
Referee: Manfred Roßner (East Germany)

== Final ==
3 June 1984

Hungary	0 – 0	Soviet Union
Penalties
	3 – 2

Central Lenin Stadium, Moscow
Attendance: 72.800
Referee: Jose Rosa dos Santos (Portugal)

1984 UEFA European Under-18 Championship

Hungary
Third title

== Qualification to World Youth Championship ==
The six best performing teams qualified for the 1985 FIFA World Youth Championship: four semifinalists and the best group runners-up (based on points, goal difference and scored goals). This would mean that both Poland and Scotland should have qualified. As for Poland, officials of the Polish Football Association (PZPN) missed deadline for application to the tournament. It is not clear why Scotland did not participate.

- Bulgaria
- England
- Hungary
- Republic of Ireland
- Soviet Union (host)
- Spain
