= 1978 Campeonato Brasileiro Série A =

Annual soccer tournament

Campeonato Brasileiro Série A
- Season: 1978
- Champions: Guarani (1st title)
- Copa Libertadores de América: Guarani; Palmeiras
- Matches: 792
- Goals: 1,771 (2.24 per match)
- Top goalscorer: Paulinho (Vasco da Gama) - 19 goals
- Biggest home win: Guarani 7-0 Itabuna (April 30, 1978)
- Biggest away win: Sergipe 0-5 Vasco da Gama (May 11, 1978); Remo 0-5 Vasco da Gama (June 10, 1978)
- Highest scoring: Botafogo-PB 6-3 Uberlândia (May 1, 1978)
- Longest winning run: Guarani (11 matches)
- Longest unbeaten run: Botafogo (24 matches)
- Longest losing run: Nacional-AM (8 matches)
- Average attendance: 10,540

The 1978 Campeonato Brasileiro Série A, (officially the IV Copa Brasil) was the 23rd edition of the Campeonato Brasileiro Série A.

== Overview ==
It was contested by 74 teams, and Guarani won the championship.

== First phase ==
=== Group A ===
Pos	Team	Pld	W	D	L	GF	GA	GD	PE	Pts
1	(Rio Grande do Sul) Internacional	12	8	2	2	26	11	+15	3	21
2	(Rio Grande do Sul) Grêmio	12	8	3	1	22	9	+13	1	20
3	(Paraná (state)) Coritiba	12	7	3	2	16	9	+7	0	17
4	(Rio Grande do Sul) Caxias	12	5	5	2	13	9	+4	0	15
5	(Rio Grande do Sul) Juventude	12	4	5	3	12	10	+2	1	14
6	(Santa Catarina (state)) Joinville	12	3	7	2	11	10	+1	0	13
7	(Paraná (state)) Londrina	12	5	1	6	17	16	+1	1	12
8	(Paraná (state)) Grêmio Maringá	12	4	3	5	18	15	+3	1	12
9	(Santa Catarina (state)) Chapecoense	12	4	1	7	9	17	−8	0	9
10	(Paraná (state)) Atlético-PR	12	3	3	6	7	15	−8	0	9
11	(Santa Catarina (state)) Figueirense	12	2	5	5	12	17	−5	0	9
12	(Paraná (state)) Colorado	12	4	0	8	7	15	−8	0	8
13	(Rio Grande do Sul) Brasil de Pelotas	12	1	2	9	6	23	−17	0	4

=== Group B ===
Pos	Team	Pld	W	D	L	GF	GA	GD	PE	Pts
1	(Pernambuco) Santa Cruz	12	8	4	0	24	6	+18	3	23
2	(Minas Gerais) Cruzeiro	12	8	2	2	30	13	+17	3	21
3	(Pernambuco) Náutico	12	9	1	2	22	9	+13	1	20
4	(Minas Gerais) Atlético Mineiro	12	7	3	2	17	5	+12	3	20
5	(Minas Gerais) Villa Nova	12	6	2	4	13	9	+4	0	14
6	(Pernambuco) Sport	12	5	4	3	13	7	+6	0	14
7	(Rio Grande do Norte) ABC	12	3	5	4	12	18	−6	0	11
8	(Rio Grande do Norte) América-RN	12	2	6	4	11	15	−4	0	10
9	(Paraíba) Botafogo-PB	12	3	2	7	17	26	−9	1	9
10	(Paraíba) Campinense	12	2	4	6	11	24	−13	1	9
11	(Minas Gerais) Uberaba	12	2	5	5	7	14	−7	0	9
12	(Minas Gerais) Uberlândia	12	1	5	6	11	28	−17	0	7
13	(Minas Gerais) América-MG	12	1	2	9	10	24	−14	1	5

=== Group C ===
Pos	Team	Pld	W	D	L	GF	GA	GD	PE	Pts
1	(São Paulo (state)) Corinthians	11	6	5	0	15	1	+14	3	20
2	Goiás	11	6	3	2	13	5	+8	1	16
3	(Mato Grosso) Mixto	11	4	7	0	14	7	+7	1	16
4	(Mato Grosso do Sul) Operário-MS	11	5	4	2	11	7	+4	1	15
5	(São Paulo (state)) Santos	11	3	5	3	16	11	+5	2	13
6	(Federal District (Brazil)) Brasília	11	4	3	4	10	13	−3	0	11
7	(Mato Grosso do Sul) Comercial-MS	11	2	7	2	9	10	−1	0	11
8	(Goiás) Vila Nova	11	3	3	5	9	12	−3	1	10
9	(Espírito Santo) Desportiva	11	2	5	4	5	9	−4	0	9
10	(Mato Grosso) Dom Bosco	11	2	4	5	11	18	−7	1	9
11	(Goiás) Anapolina	11	1	5	5	7	12	−5	0	7
12	(Espírito Santo) Rio Branco-ES	11	1	3	7	5	20	−15	0	5

=== Group D ===
Pos	Team	Pld	W	D	L	GF	GA	GD	PE	Pts
1	(Rio de Janeiro (state)) Vasco da Gama	11	8	3	0	26	5	+21	3	22
2	(Rio de Janeiro (state)) Botafogo	11	7	4	0	16	3	+13	2	20
3	Bahia	11	6	3	2	17	7	+10	1	16
4	(São Paulo (state)) Ponte Preta	11	6	2	3	19	10	+9	2	16
5	(São Paulo (state)) Guarani	11	5	4	2	21	9	+12	2	16
6	(Bahia) Vitória	11	5	3	3	12	12	0	0	13
7	(Alagoas) CRB	11	4	4	3	16	12	+4	0	12
8	(Alagoas) CSA	11	3	2	6	10	18	−8	0	8
9	(Sergipe) Confiança	11	1	3	7	8	21	−13	0	5
10	(Rio de Janeiro (state)) Volta Redonda	11	1	3	7	3	16	−13	0	5
11	Sergipe	11	1	3	7	5	20	−15	0	5
12	(Bahia) Itabuna	11	1	2	8	7	27	−20	0	4

=== Group E ===
Pos	Team	Pld	W	D	L	GF	GA	GD	PE	Pts
1	(São Paulo (state)) Palmeiras	11	6	4	1	20	4	+16	3	19
2	(São Paulo (state)) São Paulo	11	6	2	3	23	9	+14	3	17
3	(São Paulo (state)) Botafogo-SP	11	5	3	3	23	16	+7	3	16
4	Ceará	11	6	3	2	13	10	+3	0	15
5	(São Paulo (state)) América-SP	11	6	0	5	12	9	+3	1	13
6	(São Paulo (state)) Comercial-SP	11	4	4	3	11	8	+3	1	13
7	(São Paulo (state)) Noroeste	11	4	3	4	9	11	−2	0	11
8	(Ceará) Fortaleza	11	3	4	4	10	10	0	1	11
9	(Maranhão) Moto Club	11	3	5	3	6	7	−1	0	11
10	(Piauí) River	11	2	3	6	8	21	−13	0	7
10	(Maranhão) Sampaio Corrêa	11	2	3	6	8	21	−13	0	7
12	(Piauí) Flamengo-PI	11	0	4	7	1	19	−18	0	4

=== Group F ===
Pos	Team	Pld	W	D	L	GF	GA	GD	PE	Pts
1	(Rio de Janeiro (state)) Flamengo	11	10	0	1	19	7	+12	1	21
2	(São Paulo (state)) Portuguesa	11	7	3	1	20	4	+16	2	19
3	(Pará) Remo	11	6	2	3	15	4	+11	2	16
4	(Rio de Janeiro (state)) América-RJ	11	5	3	3	13	11	+2	0	13
5	(Rio de Janeiro (state)) Fluminense	11	5	2	4	9	9	0	0	12
6	(Rio de Janeiro (state)) Goytacaz	11	4	3	4	8	8	0	1	12
7	(Rio de Janeiro (state)) Americano	11	2	7	2	5	4	+1	0	11
8	(Amazonas (Brazilian state)) Fast	11	4	2	5	8	14	−6	0	10
9	(Pará) Paysandu	11	2	5	4	6	11	−5	0	9
10	(Rio de Janeiro (state)) Bangu	11	3	0	8	10	20	−10	1	7
11	(São Paulo (state)) XV de Piracicaba	11	1	4	6	9	16	−7	0	6
12	(Amazonas (Brazilian state)) Nacional-AM	11	1	1	9	4	18	−14	0	3

== Second phase ==
=== Group G ===
Pos	Team	Pld	W	D	L	GF	GA	GD	PE	Pts
1	(Rio Grande do Sul) Internacional	8	6	2	0	13	6	+7	0	14
2	(Minas Gerais) Cruzeiro	8	5	3	0	9	3	+6	0	13
3	(São Paulo (state)) Palmeiras	8	3	3	2	5	5	0	0	9
4	(São Paulo (state)) Ponte Preta	8	2	3	3	7	7	0	0	7
5	(Rio de Janeiro (state)) Goytacaz	8	2	3	3	9	11	−2	0	7
6	(Bahia) Vitória	8	2	3	3	4	7	−3	0	7
7	(Minas Gerais) Atlético Mineiro	8	1	5	2	7	7	0	0	7
8	(São Paulo (state)) América-SP	8	1	3	4	9	8	+1	1	6
9	(Mato Grosso) Mixto	8	1	1	6	6	15	−9	0	3

=== Group H ===
Pos	Team	Pld	W	D	L	GF	GA	GD	PE	Pts
1	(Pernambuco) Santa Cruz	8	5	3	0	11	5	+6	0	13
2	Goiás	8	4	1	3	13	9	+4	2	11
3	Bahia	8	3	3	2	10	9	+1	1	10
4	(Rio Grande do Sul) Grêmio	8	2	5	1	8	7	+1	1	10
5	(Rio de Janeiro (state)) Fluminense	8	3	3	2	7	6	+1	0	9
6	(São Paulo (state)) Santos	8	2	3	3	6	8	−2	1	8
7	(Pernambuco) Náutico	8	2	2	4	9	10	−1	1	7
8	Ceará	8	2	1	5	11	13	−2	1	6
9	(Santa Catarina (state)) Joinville	8	1	3	4	6	14	−8	0	5

=== Group I ===
Pos	Team	Pld	W	D	L	GF	GA	GD	PE	Pts
1	(Rio de Janeiro (state)) Botafogo	8	5	3	0	15	5	+10	2	15
2	(Pernambuco) Sport	8	3	3	2	12	6	+6	2	11
3	(São Paulo (state)) Botafogo-SP	8	4	1	3	10	7	+3	1	10
4	(São Paulo (state)) Corinthians	8	4	1	3	7	7	0	0	9
5	(Rio de Janeiro (state)) América-RJ	8	3	3	2	9	8	+1	0	9
6	(Mato Grosso do Sul) Operário-MS	8	3	2	3	7	9	−2	0	8
7	(Rio de Janeiro (state)) Flamengo (Note: Flamengo qualified as the eliminated team in the groups G, H, I and J with the best campaign overall.)	8	2	4	2	7	6	+1	0	8
8	(Rio Grande do Sul) Juventude	8	1	2	5	6	17	−11	0	4
9	(São Paulo (state)) Comercial-SP	8	0	3	5	3	11	−8	0	3

=== Group J ===
Pos	Team	Pld	W	D	L	GF	GA	GD	PE	Pts
1	(Rio de Janeiro (state)) Vasco da Gama	8	5	2	1	19	6	+13	2	14
2	(São Paulo (state)) São Paulo	8	4	3	1	13	6	+7	2	13
3	(São Paulo (state)) Portuguesa	8	5	2	1	15	9	+6	0	12
4	(São Paulo (state)) Guarani	8	3	3	2	12	10	+2	2	11
5	(Rio Grande do Sul) Caxias	8	3	2	3	11	9	+2	2	10
6	(Paraná (state)) Coritiba	8	3	2	3	8	8	0	1	9
7	(Pará) Remo	8	3	1	4	12	16	−4	1	8
8	(Minas Gerais) Villa Nova	8	2	0	6	6	17	−11	1	5
9	(Federal District (Brazil)) Brasília	8	0	1	7	1	16	−15	0	1

=== Group K ===
Pos	Team	Pld	W	D	L	GF	GA	GD	PE	Pts
1	(Paraná (state)) Londrina	6	5	1	0	11	4	+7	0	11
2	(Paraná (state)) Colorado	6	3	2	1	8	5	+3	1	9
3	(Paraná (state)) Grêmio Maringá (Note: Grêmio Maringá qualified as the eliminated team in the groups K, L, M, N, O and P with the best overall campaign.)	6	3	1	2	11	7	+4	1	8
4	(Santa Catarina (state)) Chapecoense	6	1	4	1	4	5	−1	0	6
5	(Santa Catarina (state)) Figueirense	6	2	1	3	6	6	0	0	5
6	(Rio Grande do Sul) Brasil de Pelotas	6	1	1	4	5	13	−8	0	3
7	(Paraná (state)) Atlético-PR	6	0	2	4	3	8	−5	0	2

=== Group L ===
Pos	Team	Pld	W	D	L	GF	GA	GD	PE	Pts
1	(Paraíba) Botafogo-PB	6	4	2	0	10	2	+8	1	11
2	(Rio Grande do Norte) ABC	6	2	4	0	7	4	+3	0	8
3	(Minas Gerais) Uberaba	6	1	4	1	6	6	0	0	6
4	(Minas Gerais) Uberlândia	6	1	3	2	3	3	0	0	5
5	(Minas Gerais) América-MG	6	1	3	2	4	6	−2	0	5
6	(Paraíba) Campinense	6	1	3	2	4	9	−5	0	5
7	(Rio Grande do Norte) América-RN	6	0	3	3	6	10	−4	0	3

=== Group M ===
Pos	Team	Pld	W	D	L	GF	GA	GD	PE	Pts
1	(Mato Grosso) Dom Bosco	5	3	1	1	8	4	+4	1	8
2	(Mato Grosso do Sul) Comercial-MS	5	2	2	1	7	5	+2	0	6
3	(Goiás) Vila Nova	5	2	1	2	5	7	−2	0	5
4	(Espírito Santo) Desportiva	5	2	0	3	5	6	−1	0	4
5	(Espírito Santo) Rio Branco-ES	5	1	2	2	6	7	−1	0	4
6	(Goiás) Anapolina	5	1	2	2	4	6	−2	0	4

=== Group N ===
Pos	Team	Pld	W	D	L	GF	GA	GD	PE	Pts
1	(Rio de Janeiro (state)) Volta Redonda	5	4	0	1	8	4	+4	1	9
2	(Alagoas) CRB	5	3	1	1	5	2	+3	0	7
3	(Bahia) Itabuna	5	2	1	2	6	3	+3	1	6
4	(Alagoas) CSA	5	2	2	1	8	6	+2	0	6
5	(Sergipe) Confiança	5	2	0	3	5	9	−4	0	4
6	Sergipe	5	0	0	5	2	10	−8	0	0

=== Group O ===
Pos	Team	Pld	W	D	L	GF	GA	GD	PE	Pts
1	(São Paulo (state)) Noroeste	5	4	0	1	8	4	+4	0	8
2	(Ceará) Fortaleza	5	3	1	1	7	4	+3	0	7
3	(Piauí) Flamengo-PI	5	3	0	2	5	4	+1	0	6
4	(Maranhão) Sampaio Corrêa	5	1	2	2	3	5	−2	0	4
5	(Maranhão) Moto Club	5	1	1	3	4	7	−3	0	3
6	(Piauí) River	5	1	0	4	5	8	−3	0	2

=== Group P ===
Pos	Team	Pld	W	D	L	GF	GA	GD	PE	Pts
1	(Rio de Janeiro (state)) Americano	5	3	2	0	8	1	+7	1	9
2	(Rio de Janeiro (state)) Bangu	5	3	2	0	9	3	+6	1	9
3	(São Paulo (state)) XV de Piracicaba	5	2	1	2	7	6	+1	1	6
4	(Pará) Paysandu	5	1	3	1	9	6	+3	1	6
5	(Amazonas (Brazilian state)) Fast	5	1	1	3	4	11	−7	0	3
6	(Amazonas (Brazilian state)) Nacional-AM	5	0	1	4	1	11	−10	0	1

== Third phase ==
=== Group Q ===
Pos	Team	Pld	W	D	L	GF	GA	GD	PE	Pts
1	(São Paulo (state)) Guarani	7	6	1	0	12	2	+10	2	15
2	(Rio Grande do Sul) Internacional	7	6	0	1	12	5	+7	1	13
3	(São Paulo (state)) Botafogo-SP	7	4	0	3	12	7	+5	1	9
4	Goiás	7	3	1	3	9	9	0	1	8
5	(São Paulo (state)) Santos	7	2	2	3	10	6	+4	2	8
6	(Paraíba) Botafogo-PB	7	2	1	4	6	10	−4	0	5
7	(Paraná (state)) Londrina	7	1	1	5	4	13	−9	0	3
8	(Rio de Janeiro (state)) Goytacaz	7	1	0	6	3	16	−13	0	2

=== Group R ===
Pos	Team	Pld	W	D	L	GF	GA	GD	PE	Pts
1	(Pernambuco) Santa Cruz	7	3	4	0	17	9	+8	2	12
2	(Pernambuco) Sport	7	4	2	1	9	6	+3	1	11
3	(São Paulo (state)) Ponte Preta	7	2	5	0	8	2	+6	2	11
4	(Mato Grosso do Sul) Operário-MS	7	3	2	2	8	8	0	0	8
5	(Rio de Janeiro (state)) Fluminense	7	2	3	2	7	5	+2	1	8
6	(São Paulo (state)) Portuguesa	7	2	3	2	6	5	+1	0	7
7	(Mato Grosso) Dom Bosco	7	1	1	5	6	14	−8	0	3
8	(Rio de Janeiro (state)) Volta Redonda	7	0	2	5	3	15	−12	0	2

=== Group S ===
Pos	Team	Pld	W	D	L	GF	GA	GD	PE	Pts
1	(Rio Grande do Sul) Grêmio	7	6	1	0	18	3	+15	3	16
2	(São Paulo (state)) Palmeiras	7	2	4	1	11	5	+6	2	10
3	(Rio de Janeiro (state)) Botafogo	7	3	3	1	9	8	+1	0	9
4	(Rio de Janeiro (state)) América-RJ	7	3	1	3	7	9	−2	0	7
5	(Paraná (state)) Coritiba	7	2	3	2	5	6	−1	0	7
6	(Rio de Janeiro (state)) Flamengo	7	1	3	3	7	10	−3	0	5
7	(São Paulo (state)) Noroeste	7	1	2	4	4	16	−12	0	4
8	(São Paulo (state)) São Paulo	7	0	3	4	6	10	−4	0	3

=== Group T ===
Pos	Team	Pld	W	D	L	GF	GA	GD	PE	Pts
1	Bahia	7	5	1	1	14	3	+11	2	13
2	(Rio de Janeiro (state)) Vasco da Gama	7	4	3	0	13	5	+8	1	12
3	(Rio Grande do Sul) Caxias	7	3	3	1	11	5	+6	1	10
4	(São Paulo (state)) Corinthians	7	2	3	2	7	8	−1	0	7
5	(Minas Gerais) Cruzeiro	7	1	5	1	5	5	0	0	7
6	(Rio de Janeiro (state)) Americano	7	2	1	4	3	12	−9	0	5
7	(Paraná (state)) Grêmio Maringá	7	1	2	4	7	10	−3	1	5
8	(Bahia) Vitória	7	0	2	5	2	14	−12	0	2

== Quarterfinals ==
Team 1	Agg.	Team 2	1st leg	2nd leg
Palmeiras	3–2	Bahia	2-1	1-1
Internacional	3–1	Santa Cruz	1-0	2-1
Sport	0–6	Guarani	0-2	0-4
Vasco da Gama	2–2	Grêmio	1-1	1-1

=== First leg ===
26 July 1978

Palmeiras (São Paulo (state))	2 – 1	Bahia
Toninho 16', 53'		Beijoca 71'

Morumbi, São Paulo (SP)
Attendance: 46,745
Referee: (Rio de Janeiro (state)) Valquir Pimentel

26 July 1978

Internacional (Rio Grande do Sul)	1 – 0	(Pernambuco) Santa Cruz
Jair 21'

Beira-Rio, Porto Alegre (RS)
Attendance: 30,859
Referee: (São Paulo (state)) Oscar Scolfaro

27 July 1978

Sport (Pernambuco)	0 – 2	(São Paulo (state)) Guarani
		Zenon 17'; Capitão 75'

Arruda, Recife (PE)
Attendance: 16,518
Referee: (Rio de Janeiro (state)) Luís Carlos Félix

27 July 1978

Vasco da Gama (Rio de Janeiro (state))	1 – 1	(Rio Grande do Sul) Grêmio
Guina 79'		André Catimba 79'

Maracanã, Rio de Janeiro (RJ)
Attendance: 84,327
Referee: (São Paulo (state)) Emídio Marques de Mesquita

=== Second leg ===
30 July 1978

Bahia	1 – 1	(São Paulo (state)) Palmeiras
Douglas 59'		Toninho 24'

Estádio Fonte Nova, Salvador (BA)
Attendance: 80,000
Referee: (Rio de Janeiro (state)) José Roberto Wright

30 July 1978

Santa Cruz (Pernambuco)	1 – 2	(Rio Grande do Sul) Internacional
Nunes 6'		Bill 48', 89'

Arruda, Recife (PE)
Attendance: 39,647
Referee: (Rio de Janeiro (state)) Valquir Pimentel

30 July 1978

Guarani (São Paulo (state))	4 – 0	(Pernambuco) Sport
Miranda 10'; Capitão 50', 65'; Renato 80'

Brinco de Ouro, Campinas (SP)
Attendance: 18,216
Referee: (Rio de Janeiro (state)) Arnaldo Cézar Coelho

30 July 1978

Grêmio (Rio Grande do Sul)	1 – 1	(Rio de Janeiro (state)) Vasco da Gama
Tarciso 39'		Roberto Dinamite 19'

Olímpico, Porto Alegre (RS)
Attendance: 57,965
Referee: (São Paulo (state)) José de Assis Aragão

== Semifinals ==
Team 1	Agg.	Team 2	1st leg	2nd leg
Guarani	4–1	Vasco da Gama	2-0	2-1
Palmeiras	3–1	Internacional	2-0	1-1

=== First leg ===
2 August 1978

Guarani (São Paulo (state))	2 – 0	(Rio de Janeiro (state)) Vasco da Gama
Orlando 45+3' (o.g.); Renato 54'

Brinco de Ouro, Campinas (SP)
Attendance: 30,092
Referee: (Pernambuco) Manuel Amaro de Lima

3 August 1978

Palmeiras (São Paulo (state))	2 – 0	(Rio Grande do Sul) Internacional
Toninho 16', 81'

Morumbi, São Paulo (SP)
Attendance: 59,459
Referee: (Rio de Janeiro (state)) Luís Carlos Félix

=== Second leg ===
6 August 1978

Vasco da Gama (Rio de Janeiro (state))	1 – 2	(São Paulo (state)) Guarani
Dirceu 82'		Zenon 7', 65'

Estádio do Maracanã, Rio de Janeiro (RJ)
Attendance: 101,541
Referee: (Minas Gerais) Maurílio José Santiago

6 August 1978

Internacional (Rio Grande do Sul)	1 – 1	(São Paulo (state)) Palmeiras
Chico Spina 29'		Jorge Mendonça 86'

Beira-Rio, Porto Alegre (RS)
Attendance: 56,611
Referee: (Rio de Janeiro (state)) Valquir Pimentel

== Finals ==
=== First leg ===
10 August 1978

Palmeiras (São Paulo (state))	0 – 1	(São Paulo (state)) Guarani
		Zenon 76'

Estádio do Morumbi, São Paulo (SP)
Attendance: 99,829
Referee: (Rio de Janeiro (state)) Arnaldo Cézar Coelho

=== Second leg ===
13 August 1978

Guarani (São Paulo (state))	1 – 0	(São Paulo (state)) Palmeiras
Careca 36'

Brinco de Ouro, Campinas (SP)
Attendance: 27,086
Referee: (Rio de Janeiro (state)) José Roberto Wright

== Final standings ==
Pos	Team	Pld	W	D	L	GF	GA	GD	PE	Pts
1	Guarani	32	20	8	4	57	22	+35	6	54
2	Palmeiras	32	13	13	6	42	19	+23	5	44
3	Internacional	31	22	5	4	55	26	+29	4	53
4	Vasco da Gama	30	17	10	3	61	22	+39	6	50
5	Santa Cruz	29	16	11	2	53	23	+30	5	48
6	Grêmio	29	16	11	2	50	21	+29	5	48
7	Bahia	28	14	8	6	43	22	+21	4	40
8	Sport	29	12	9	8	34	25	+9	3	36
9	Botafogo	26	15	10	1	40	16	+24	4	44
10	Cruzeiro	27	14	10	3	44	21	+23	3	41
11	Portuguesa	26	14	8	4	41	18	+23	2	38
12	Corinthians	26	12	9	5	29	16	+13	3	36
13	Botafogo-SP	26	13	4	9	45	30	+15	5	35
14	Goiás	26	13	5	8	35	23	+12	4	35
15	Caxias	27	11	10	6	35	23	+12	3	35
16	Flamengo	26	13	7	6	33	23	+10	1	34
17	Ponte Preta	26	10	10	6	34	19	+15	4	34
18	Coritiba	27	12	8	7	29	23	+6	1	33
19	São Paulo	26	10	8	8	42	25	+17	5	33
20	Operário-MS	26	11	8	7	26	24	+2	1	31
21	América-RJ	26	11	7	8	29	28	+1	0	29
22	Fluminense	26	10	8	8	23	20	+3	1	29
23	Santos	26	7	10	9	32	25	+7	5	29
24	Londrina	25	11	3	11	32	33	−1	1	26
25	Botafogo-PB	25	9	5	11	33	38	−5	2	25
26	Maringá	25	8	6	11	36	32	+4	3	25
27	Americano-RJ	23	7	10	6	16	17	−1	1	25
28	Noroeste	23	9	5	9	21	31	−10	0	23
29	Vitória	26	7	8	11	18	33	−15	0	22
30	Goytacaz-RJ	26	7	6	13	20	35	−15	1	21
31	Dom Bosco-MT	23	6	6	11	25	36	−11	2	20
32	Volta Redonda	23	5	5	13	14	35	−21	1	16
33	Náutico	20	11	3	6	31	19	+12	2	27
34	Atlético Mineiro	20	8	8	4	24	12	+12	3	27
35	Remo	19	9	3	7	27	20	+7	3	24
36	Ceará	19	8	4	7	24	23	+1	1	21
37	Villa Nova-MG	20	8	2	10	19	26	−7	1	19
38	América-SP	19	7	3	9	21	17	+4	2	19
39	Mixto	19	5	8	6	20	22	−2	1	19
40	Juventude	20	5	7	8	18	27	−9	1	18
41	Joinville	20	4	10	6	17	24	−7	0	18
42	Comercial-SP	19	4	7	8	14	19	−5	1	16
43	Brasília	19	4	4	11	11	29	−18	0	12
44	CRB	16	7	5	4	21	14	+7	0	19
45	ABC	18	5	9	4	19	22	−3	0	19
46	Fortaleza	16	6	5	5	17	14	+3	1	18
47	Colorado	18	7	2	9	15	20	−5	1	17
48	Comercial-MS	16	4	9	3	16	15	+1	0	17
49	Bangu	16	6	2	8	19	23	−4	2	16
50	Vila Nova-GO	16	5	4	7	14	19	−5	1	15
51	Chapecoense	18	5	5	8	13	22	−9	0	15
52	Paysandu	16	3	8	5	15	17	−2	1	15
53	CSA	16	5	4	7	18	24	−6	0	14
54	Moto Club	16	4	6	6	10	14	−4	0	14
55	Figueirense	18	4	6	8	18	23	−5	0	14
56	Campinense	18	3	7	8	15	33	−18	1	14
57	Fast	16	5	3	8	12	25	−13	0	13
58	Desportiva Capixaba	16	4	5	7	10	15	−5	0	13
59	Uberaba	18	2	9	7	13	20	−7	0	13
60	América-RN	18	2	9	7	17	25	−8	0	13
61	XV de Piracicaba	16	3	5	8	16	22	−6	1	12
62	Atlético Paranaense	18	3	5	10	10	23	−13	0	11
63	Sampaio Corrêa	16	3	5	8	11	26	−15	0	11
64	Uberlândia	18	3	5	10	14	31	−17	0	11
65	Anapolina	16	2	7	7	11	18	−7	0	11
66	Flamengo-PI	16	3	4	9	7	23	−16	0	10
67	Itabuna	16	3	3	10	13	30	−17	1	10
68	América Mineiro	18	2	5	11	14	30	−16	1	10
69	River	16	3	3	10	13	29	−16	0	9
70	Confiança	16	3	3	10	13	30	−17	0	9
71	Rio Branco-ES	16	2	5	9	11	27	−16	0	9
72	Brasil de Pelotas	18	2	3	13	11	36	−25	0	7
73	Sergipe	16	1	3	12	7	30	−23	0	5
74	Nacional	16	1	2	13	5	29	−24	0	4

Source: rsssf.com
