= FIFA U-20 World Cup records and statistics =

This is a list of records and statistics of the FIFA U-20 World Cup.

== Debut of national teams ==
Year	Debuting teams			Successor teams
Year	Teams	No.	Cum.	Successor teams
1977	Austria, Brazil, France, Honduras, Hungary, Iran, Iraq, Italy, Ivory Coast, Mexico, Morocco, Paraguay, Spain, Tunisia, Soviet Union, Uruguay	16	16	
1979	Algeria, Argentina, Canada, Guinea, Indonesia, Japan, Poland, Portugal, South Korea, Yugoslavia	10	26	
1981	Australia, Cameroon, Egypt, England, Qatar, Romania, United States, West Germany	8	34	
1983	China, Czechoslovakia, Scotland, Netherlands, Nigeria	5	39	
1985	Bulgaria, Colombia, Republic of Ireland, Saudi Arabia	4	43	
1987	Bahrain, Chile, East Germany, Togo	4	47	
1989	Costa Rica, Mali, Norway, Syria	4	51	
1991	Sweden, Trinidad and Tobago	2	53	
1993	Ghana, Turkey	2	55	Russia
1995	Burundi	1	56	
1997	Belgium, Malaysia, South Africa, United Arab Emirates	4	60	
1999	Croatia, Kazakhstan, Zambia	3	63	
2001	Angola, Ecuador, Ethiopia, Finland, Jamaica, Ukraine	6	69	Czech Republic
2003	Burkina Faso, Panama, Uzbekistan	3	72	Slovakia
2005	Benin, Switzerland	2	74	
2007	Congo, Gambia, Jordan, New Zealand, North Korea	5	79	
2009	Tahiti, Venezuela	2	81	
2011	Guatemala	1	82	
2013	Cuba, El Salvador, Greece	3	85	
2015	Fiji, Myanmar, Senegal	3	88	Serbia
2017	Vanuatu, Vietnam	2	90	
2019	None	0	90	
2023	Dominican Republic, Israel	2	92	
2025	New Caledonia	1	93	
2027	Azerbaijan	1	94	
2029	Armenia, Georgia	2	96	

== Overall team records ==
In this ranking 3 points are awarded for a win, 1 for a draw and 0 for a loss. As per statistical convention in football, matches decided in extra time are counted as wins and losses, while matches decided by penalty shoot-outs are counted as draws. Teams are ranked by total points, then by goal difference, then by goals scored.

As of 2025 FIFA U-20 World Cup.

Rank	Team	Part	Pld	W	D	L	GF	GA	GD	Points
1	Brazil	20	111	75	17	19	250	83	+167	242
2	Argentina	18	93	64	9	20	188	75	+113	201
3	Spain	16	77	45	14	18	156	84	+72	149
4	Uruguay	16	80	40	21	19	108	70	+38	141
5	United States	18	76	33	10	33	120	104	+16	109
6	Portugal	12	57	31	11	15	81	50	+31	104
7	Colombia	12	55	27	12	16	83	63	+20	93
8	Nigeria	14	65	27	12	26	94	83	+11	93
9	Mexico	17	70	24	20	26	99	79	+20	92
10	Ghana	7	43	26	9	8	76	47	+29	87
11	South Korea	17	71	23	17	31	89	109	–20	86
12	France	9	45	25	7	13	86	55	+31	82
13	Germany	11	47	24	9	14	91	51	+40	81
14	Italy	9	45	19	9	17	60	57	+3	66
15	Australia	16	59	17	15	27	67	95	–28	66
16	Japan	12	50	19	12	19	67	61	+6	69
17	Russia	8	38	18	11	9	63	45	+18	65
18	England	12	49	16	16	17	50	48	+2	64
19	Paraguay	10	40	14	11	15	50	52	–2	53
20	Egypt	9	35	13	5	17	48	50	-2	44
21	Chile	7	32	13	5	14	51	57	–6	44
22	Ukraine	5	23	12	7	4	41	21	+20	43
23	Costa Rica	9	35	12	4	19	41	62	–21	40
24	Czech Republic	6	26	9	10	7	34	31	+3	37
25	Mali	7	31	10	7	14	45	61	–16	37
26	Serbia	3	16	11	2	3	32	13	+19	35
27	Poland	5	23	9	4	10	36	28	+8	31
28	Morocco	4	21	9	4	8	28	25	+3	31
29	Ecuador	5	22	8	5	9	32	23	+9	29
30	Republic of Ireland	5	21	8	5	8	30	27	+3	29
31	Netherlands	4	17	8	4	5	30	20	+10	28
32	Iraq	5	20	8	4	8	27	37	–10	28
33	Senegal	4	19	6	7	6	20	23	–3	25
34	Hungary	6	23	7	4	12	33	39	–6	25
35	Cameroon	6	21	7	4	10	28	36	–8	25
36	China	5	18	7	3	8	25	26	–1	24
37	New Zealand	8	28	6	6	16	27	51	–24	24
38	Saudi Arabia	10	32	5	8	19	28	44	–16	23
39	Venezuela	2	11	7	1	3	24	8	+16	22
40	Uzbekistan	5	20	5	3	12	25	35	–10	18
41	Austria	5	20	4	6	10	10	33	–23	18
42	Zambia	3	12	5	2	5	22	23	–1	17
43	United Arab Emirates	3	14	5	2	7	12	26	–14	17
44	Canada	8	27	4	5	18	16	50	–34	17
45	Syria	4	14	4	4	6	13	23	–10	16
46	Honduras	9	27	5	1	21	27	86	–59	16
47	Norway	4	14	4	3	7	21	18	+3	15
48	East Germany	2	9	4	1	4	13	10	+3	13
49	Israel	1	7	4	1	2	11	8	+3	13
50	Romania	1	6	4	1	1	6	3	+3	13
51	Gambia	2	8	4	1	3	8	9	–1	13
52	South Africa	5	17	3	4	10	20	31	–11	13
53	Scotland	3	11	3	3	5	12	15	–3	12
54	Croatia	3	11	3	3	5	12	18	–6	12
55	Bulgaria	2	8	3	2	3	8	9	–1	11
56	Turkey	3	11	3	2	6	11	21	–10	11
57	Qatar	4	15	3	2	10	9	26	–17	11
58	Ivory Coast	5	16	1	7	8	13	30	–17	10
59	Slovakia	2	8	3	0	5	12	13	-1	9
60	Panama	7	22	1	5	16	15	44	–29	8
61	Burkina Faso	1	4	2	1	1	2	1	+1	7
62	Iran	3	9	2	1	6	8	19	–11	7
63	Tunisia	3	10	2	0	8	7	19	–12	6
64	Greece	1	4	1	2	1	4	5	–1	5
65	Angola	1	4	1	2	1	3	4	–1	5
66	Algeria	1	4	1	2	1	2	6	–4	5
67	Congo	1	4	1	1	2	3	7	–4	4
68	Belgium	1	4	1	1	2	4	14	–10	4
69	Sweden	1	3	1	0	2	4	6	–2	3
70	Finland	1	3	1	0	2	2	4	–2	3
71	Switzerland	1	3	1	0	2	2	5	–3	3
72	El Salvador	1	3	1	0	2	2	7	–5	3
73	Guatemala	2	7	1	0	6	1	18	–17	3
74	North Korea	3	9	0	3	6	3	21	–18	3
75	Fiji	2	6	1	0	5	4	27	–23	3
76	Benin	1	3	0	2	1	2	3	–1	2
77	Jordan	1	3	0	1	2	3	6	–3	1
78	Bahrain	1	3	0	1	2	1	4	–3	1
79	Jamaica	1	3	0	1	2	1	6	–5	1
80	Burundi	1	3	0	1	2	2	8	–6	1
81	Vietnam	1	3	0	1	2	0	6	–6	1
82	Trinidad and Tobago	2	6	0	1	5	2	18	–16	1
83	Guinea	2	6	0	1	5	1	19	–18	1
84	Cuba	2	6	0	1	5	5	18	–13	1
85	Ethiopia	1	3	0	0	3	4	8	–4	0
86	Malaysia	1	3	0	0	3	2	9	–7	0
87	Kazakhstan	1	3	0	0	3	1	9	–8	0
88	Togo	1	3	0	0	3	1	9	–8	0
89	Vanuatu	1	3	0	0	3	4	13	–9	0
90	Dominican Republic	1	3	0	0	3	1	11	–10	0
91	Myanmar	1	3	0	0	3	2	13	–11	0
92	Indonesia	1	3	0	0	3	0	16	–16	0
93	New Caledonia	1	0	0	0	3	1	20	–19	0
94	Tahiti	2	6	0	0	6	0	35	–35	0

Former countries

Team	Pld	W	D	L	GF	GA	GD	Points
Czechoslovakia (1977–1993)	7	3	1	3	10	10	0	7
West Germany (1977–1989)	12	9	2	1	26	7	+19	29
East Germany (1987–1989)	9	4	1	4	13	10	+3	13
Soviet Union (1977–1991)	30	14	9	7	52	32	+20	37
Yugoslavia (1977–1991)	9	6	1	2	22	9	+13	13

== Comprehensive team results by tournament ==
Legend

- 1st — Champions
- 2nd — Runners-up
- 3rd — Third place
- 4th — Fourth place
- QF — Quarter-finals
- R2 — Round 2 (since 1997; round of 16)
- R1 — Round 1 (group stage)
- • — Did not qualify
- × — Did not enter / Withdrew / Banned
- XX — Country did not exist or national team was inactive
- — Hosts
- Q — Qualified for upcoming tournament

For each tournament, the number of teams in each finals tournament are shown (in parentheses).

Team	Confederation	1977 (Tunisia) (16)	1979 (Japan) (16)	1981 (Australia) (16)	1983 (Mexico) (16)	1985 (Soviet Union) (16)	1987 (Chile) (16)	1989 (Saudi Arabia) (16)	1991 (Portugal) (16)	1993 (Australia) (16)	1995 (Qatar) (16)	1997 (Malaysia) (24)	1999 (Nigeria) (24)	2001 (Argentina) (24)	2003 (United Arab Emirates) (24)	2005 (Netherlands) (24)	2007 (Canada) (24)	2009 (Egypt) (24)	2011 (Colombia) (24)	2013 (Turkey) (24)	2015 (New Zealand) (24)	2017 (South Korea) (24)	2019 (Poland) (24)	2023 (Argentina) (24)	2025 (Chile) (24)	2027 (Azerbaijan) (Uzbekistan) (24)	2029 (Armenia) (Georgia (country)) (24)	2031 (24)	Total
Algeria	CAF	×	QF	•	•	•	×	•	×	•	•	•	•	•	•	•	•	•	•	•	×	•	•	•	•	•			1
Angola	CAF	×	×	×	•	•	×	•	×	×	•	•	•	R2	•	•	•	•	•	•	•	•	•	•	•	•			1
Argentina	CONMEBOL	•	1st	R1	2nd	•	•	QF	R1	•	1st	1st	R2	1st	4th	1st	1st	•	QF	•	R1	R1	R2	R2	2nd				18
Armenia	UEFA									×	•	•	•	•	•	•	•	•	•	•	•	•	•	•	•	•	Q		1
Australia	AFC	×	×	QF	R1	R1	R1	×	4th	4th	QF	R2	R1	R2	R2	R1	•	R1	R1	R1	•	•	•	•	R1	•			16
Austria	UEFA	R1	•	•	R1	•	•	•	•	•	•	•	•	•	•	•	4th	•	R1	•	R2	•	•	•	•	•			5
Azerbaijan	UEFA									×	×	•	•	•	•	•	•	•	•	•	•	•	•	•	•	Q			1
Bahrain	AFC	•	•	×	•	•	R1	•	•	•	•	•	•	•	•	•	•	•	•	•	•	•	•	•	•	•			1
Belgium	UEFA	•	•	•	•	•	•	•	•	•	•	R2	•	•	•	•	•	•	•	•	•	•	•	•	•	•			1
Benin	CAF	×	×	×	×	×	×	×	•	×	×	•	×	×	×	R1	×	•	•	•	•	×	•	•	•	•			1
Brazil	CONMEBOL	3rd	•	QF	1st	1st	QF	3rd	2nd	1st	2nd	QF	QF	QF	1st	3rd	R2	2nd	1st	•	2nd	•	•	QF	R1				20
Bulgaria	UEFA	•	•	•	•	QF	QF	•	•	•	•	•	•	•	•	•	•	•	•	•	•	•	•	•	•	•			2
Burkina Faso	CAF	×	×	×	×	×	×	×	×	×	•	•	×	•	R2	•	•	•	•	•	•	•	•	•	•				1
Burundi	CAF	×	×	×	×	×	×	×	×	×	R1	×	•	×	•	×	•	•	•	×	•	•	•	•	•	•			1
Cameroon	CAF	×	•	R1	•	•	•	•	•	R1	QF	•	R2	•	•	•	•	R1	R2	•	•	•	•	•	•				6
Canada	CONCACAF	•	R1	•	•	R1	R1	•	•	•	•	R2	•	R1	QF	R1	R1	•	•	•	•	•	•	•	•	Q			9
Chile	CONMEBOL	•	•	•	•	•	4th	•	•	•	R1	•	•	R1	•	R2	3rd	•	•	QF	•	•	•	•	R2				7
China	AFC	×	×	•	R1	QF	•	•	•	•	•	R1	•	R2	•	R2	•	•	•	•	•	•	•	•	•				5
Colombia	CONMEBOL	•	•	•	•	QF	R1	QF	•	R1	•	•	•	•	3rd	R2	•	•	QF	R2	R2	•	QF	QF	3rd				12
Congo	CAF	×	×	×	×	×	×	×	×	×	×	×	•	×	×	×	R2	•	•	•	•	•	•	•	×	•			1
Costa Rica	CONCACAF	•	•	•	•	•	•	R1	•	•	R1	R1	R2	R2	•	•	R1	4th	R2	•	•	R2	•	•	•	Q			10
Croatia	UEFA									•	•	•	R2	•	•	•	•	•	R1	R2	•	•	•	•	•	Q			3
Cuba	CONCACAF	•	•	•	•	•	•	•	•	•	•	•	•	•	•	•	•	•	•	R1	•	•	•	•	R1	•			2
Czech Republic	UEFA	•	•	•	QF	•	•	R1	•	•	•	•	•	QF	R1	•	2nd	R2	•	•	•	•	•	•	•	•			6
Dominican Republic	CONCACAF	•	•	•	×	×	×	×	×	•	×	•	×	•	•	•	•	•	×	•	•	•	•	R1	•	•			1
East Germany	UEFA	•	•	•	•	•	3rd	R1	•																				2
Ecuador	CONMEBOL	•	•	•	•	•	•	•	•	•	•	•	•	R2	•	•	•	•	R2	•	•	R1	3rd	R2	•				5
Egypt	CAF	•	•	QF	•	•	•	•	R1	•	•	•	•	3rd	R2	R1	•	R2	R2	R1	•	•	•	•	R1				9
El Salvador	CONCACAF	•	•	•	•	•	•	•	•	•	•	•	•	•	•	•	•	•	•	R1	•	•	•	•	•	•			1
England	UEFA	•	•	4th	•	R1	•	•	R1	3rd	•	R2	R1	•	R1	•	•	R1	R2	R1	•	1st	•	R2	•	•			12
Ethiopia	CAF	×	•	•	×	•	•	×	•	•	•	•	•	R1	•	×	•	×	×	×	•	•	•	•	•	•			1
Fiji	OFC	×	×	×	•	•	•	×	•	×	•	•	•	•	•	•	•	•	•	•	R1	•	•	R1	•	•			2
Team	Confederation	1977 (Tunisia) (16)	1979 (Japan) (16)	1981 (Australia) (16)	1983 (Mexico) (16)	1985 (Soviet Union) (16)	1987 (Chile) (16)	1989 (Saudi Arabia) (16)	1991 (Portugal) (16)	1993 (Australia) (16)	1995 (Qatar) (16)	1997 (Malaysia) (24)	1999 (Nigeria) (24)	2001 (Argentina) (24)	2003 (United Arab Emirates) (24)	2005 (Netherlands) (24)	2007 (Canada) (24)	2009 (Egypt) (24)	2011 (Colombia) (24)	2013 (Turkey) (24)	2015 (New Zealand) (24)	2017 (South Korea) (24)	2019 (Poland) (24)	2023 (Argentina) (24)	2025 (Chile) (24)	2027 (Azerbaijan) (Uzbekistan) (24)	2029 (Armenia) (Georgia (country)) (24)	2031 (24)	Total
Finland	UEFA	•	•	•	•	•	•	•	•	•	•	•	•	R1	•	•	•	•	•	•	•	•	•	•	•	•			1
France	UEFA	R1	•	•	•	•	•	•	•	•	•	QF	•	QF	•	•	•	•	4th	1st	•	R2	R2	R1	4th	•			9
Gambia	CAF	×	×	×	•	•	×	×	•	×	×	×	×	•	×	•	R2	•	•	•	•	•	•	R2	•				2
Germany	UEFA	•	•	1st	•	•	2nd	•	•	R1	R1	•	R1	R2	R1	QF	•	QF	•	•	QF	R2	•	•	•	Q			11
Ghana	CAF	×	×	×	×	•	•	•	•	2nd	•	4th	QF	2nd	•	•	•	1st	•	3rd	R2	•	•	•	•				7
Georgia	UEFA									×	•	•	•	•	•	•	•	•	•	•	•	•	•	•	•	•	Q		1
Greece	UEFA	•	•	•	•	•	•	•	•	•	•	•	•	•	•	•	•	•	•	R2	•	•	•	•	•	•			1
Guatemala	CONCACAF	•	×	•	•	•	×	•	•	×	•	•	•	•	•	•	•	•	R2	•	•	×	•	R1	•	•			2
Guinea	CAF	•	R1	•	•	•	•	•	•	×	•	•	•	×	•	•	•	•	•	•	•	R1	•	•	•				2
Honduras	CONCACAF	R1	•	•	•	•	×	•	•	•	R1	•	R1	•	•	R1	•	R1	•	•	R1	R1	R1	R1	•	•			9
Hungary	UEFA	R1	R1	•	•	R1	•	•	•	•	•	R1	•	•	•	•	•	3rd	•	•	R2	•	•	•	•	•			6
Indonesia	AFC	×	R1	•	•	•	•	×	•	•	•	•	×	•	•	•	•	•	•	•	•	×	•	•	•				1
Iran	AFC	R1	•	×	×	×	×	•	×	•	×	•	•	R1	•	•	•	•	•	•	•	R1	•	•	•				3
Iraq	AFC	R1	•	×	•	•	•	QF	×	×	•	×	•	R1	•	•	•	•	•	4th	•	•	•	R1	•				5
Israel	UEFA	×	•	•	•	•	•	•	•	•	•	•	•	•	•	•	•	•	•	•	•	•	•	3rd	•	•			1
Italy	UEFA	R1	•	R1	•	•	QF	•	•	•	•	•	•	•	•	QF	•	QF	•	•	•	3rd	4th	2nd	R2	•			9
Ivory Coast	CAF	R1	×	×	R1	•	•	•	R1	×	•	R1	•	•	R2	•	•	•	•	•	•	•	•	•	•	•			5
Jamaica	CONCACAF	•	•	•	•	•	•	•	•	•	•	•	•	R1	•	•	•	•	•	•	•	•	•	•	•	•			1
Japan	AFC	•	R1	•	•	•	•	•	•	•	QF	QF	2nd	R1	QF	R2	R2	•	•	•	•	R2	R2	R1	R2				12
Jordan	AFC	•	•	×	×	×	×	×	×	×	×	•	×	•	•	•	R1	•	•	•	•	•	•	•	•				1
Kazakhstan	UEFA									•	•	•	R1	•	•	•	•	•	•	•	•	•	•	•	•	•			1
Malaysia	AFC	•	•	•	•	×	•	×	•	•	•	R1	•	•	•	•	•	•	•	•	•	•	•	•	•				1
Mali	CAF	×	×	×	×	×	×	R1	•	•	•	•	3rd	•	R1	•	•	•	R1	R1	3rd	•	QF	•	•	•			7
Mexico	CONCACAF	2nd	R1	R1	R1	QF	•	×	QF	QF	•	R2	QF	•	R1	•	QF	•	3rd	R2	R1	QF	R1	•	QF	Q			18
Morocco	CAF	R1	•	•	•	•	•	•	•	•	•	R2	•	•	•	4th	•	•	•	•	•	•	•	•	1st				4
Myanmar	AFC	×	×	×	×	×	×	×	×	×	•	×	×	•	•	•	×	•	•	•	R1	•	•	•	•	•			1
Netherlands	UEFA	•	•	•	QF	•	•	•	•	•	R1	•	•	QF	•	QF	•	•	•	•	•	•	•	•	•	•			4
New Caledonia	OFC	×	×	×	×	×	×	×	×	×	×	×	×	•	•	•	•	•	•	•	•	•	•	•	R1	•			1
New Zealand	OFC	×	×	×	•	•	•	×	•	×	•	•	•	•	•	•	R1	•	R1	R1	R2	R2	R2	R2	R1	Q			9
Nigeria	CAF	×	•	•	R1	3rd	R1	2nd	•	•	•	•	QF	•	•	2nd	QF	R2	QF	R2	R2	•	R2	QF	R2	•			14
North Korea	AFC	•	•	•	•	•	•	•	•	•	•	•	•	•	•	•	R1	•	R1	•	R1	•	•	×	•				3
Norway	UEFA	•	•	•	•	•	•	R1	•	R1	•	•	•	•	•	•	•	•	•	•	•	•	R1	•	QF	•			4
Panama	CONCACAF	•	•	•	•	•	•	•	•	•	•	•	•	•	R1	R1	R1	•	R1	•	R1	•	R2	•	R1	•			7
Team	Confederation	1977 (Tunisia) (16)	1979 (Japan) (16)	1981 (Australia) (16)	1983 (Mexico) (16)	1985 (Soviet Union) (16)	1987 (Chile) (16)	1989 (Saudi Arabia) (16)	1991 (Portugal) (16)	1993 (Australia) (16)	1995 (Qatar) (16)	1997 (Malaysia) (24)	1999 (Nigeria) (24)	2001 (Argentina) (24)	2003 (United Arab Emirates) (24)	2005 (Netherlands) (24)	2007 (Canada) (24)	2009 (Egypt) (24)	2011 (Colombia) (24)	2013 (Turkey) (24)	2015 (New Zealand) (24)	2017 (South Korea) (24)	2019 (Poland) (24)	2023 (Argentina) (24)	2025 (Chile) (24)	2027 (Azerbaijan) (Uzbekistan) (24)	2029 (Armenia) (Georgia (country)) (24)	2031 (24)	Total
Paraguay	CONMEBOL	R1	QF	•	•	R1	•	•	•	•	•	R1	R2	4th	R2	•	•	R2	•	R2	•	•	•	•	R2				10
Poland	UEFA	•	4th	R1	3rd	•	•	•	•	•	•	•	•	•	•	•	R2	•	•	•	•	•	R2	•	•	•			5
Portugal	UEFA	•	QF	•	•	•	•	1st	1st	R1	3rd	•	R2	•	•	•	R2	•	2nd	R2	QF	QF	R1	•	•	•			12
Qatar	AFC	•	•	2nd	•	•	•	•	•	•	R1	•	•	•	•	•	•	•	•	•	R1	•	R1	•	•	•			4
Republic of Ireland	UEFA	•	•	•	•	R1	•	•	R1	•	•	3rd	R2	•	R2	•	•	•	•	•	•	•	•	•	•	•			5
Romania	UEFA	•	•	3rd	•	•	•	•	•	•	•	•	•	•	•	•	•	•	•	•	•	•	•	•	•	•			1
Russia	UEFA	1st	2nd	•	R1	4th	•	QF	3rd	QF	QF	•	•	•	•	•	•	•	•	•	•	•	•	×	×	×			8
Saudi Arabia	AFC	•	•	•	•	R1	R1	R1	•	R1	•	•	R1	•	R1	•	•	•	R2	•	•	R2	R1	•	R1				10
Scotland	UEFA	•	•	•	QF	•	QF	•	•	•	•	•	•	•	•	•	R1	•	•	•	•	•	•	•	•	•			3
Senegal	CAF	×	×	×	•	×	×	•	•	•	•	•	•	•	•	•	•	•	•	•	4th	R2	QF	R1	•	•			4
Serbia	UEFA	•	R1	•	•	•	1st	•	•	•	•	•	•	•	•	•	•	•	•	•	1st	•	•	•	•	•			3
Slovakia	UEFA										•	•	•	•	R2	•	•	•	•	•	•	•	•	R2	•	•			2
South Africa	CAF	×	×	×	×	×	×	×	×	×	•	R1	•	•	•	•	•	R2	•	•	•	R1	R1	•	R2				5
South Korea	AFC	•	R1	R1	4th	•	•	•	QF	R1	•	R1	R1	•	R2	R1	R1	QF	R2	QF	•	R2	2nd	4th	R2				17
Spain	UEFA	R1	QF	R1	•	2nd	•	R1	QF	•	4th	QF	1st	•	2nd	QF	QF	R2	QF	QF	•	•	•	•	QF	Q			16
Sweden	UEFA	•	•	•	•	•	•	•	R1	•	•	•	•	•	•	•	•	•	•	•	•	•	•	•	•	•			1
Switzerland	UEFA	•	•	•	•	•	•	•	•	•	•	•	•	•	•	R1	•	•	•	•	•	•	•	•	•	•			1
Syria	AFC	×	×	×	×	×	×	R1	QF	•	R1	•	•	•	•	R2	•	•	•	•	•	•	•	•	•	•			4
Tahiti	OFC	×	×	×	×	×	×	×	•	×	•	•	×	•	×	×	•	R1	×	×	×	•	R1	•	•				2
Togo	CAF	×	×	•	•	×	R1	×	×	•	•	×	•	×	•	×	•	×	•	×	•	×	•	•	•	•			1
Trinidad and Tobago	CONCACAF	•	•	•	•	•	•	•	R1	•	•	•	•	•	•	•	•	R1	•	•	•	•	•	•	•	•			2
Tunisia	CAF	R1	•	•	•	R1	•	•	•	•	•	•	•	•	•	•	•	•	•	•	•	•	•	R2	•	•			3
Turkey	UEFA	•	•	•	•	•	•	•	•	R1	•	•	•	•	•	R2	•	•	•	R2	•	•	•	•	•	•			3
Ukraine	UEFA									•	•	•	•	R2	•	R2	•	•	•	•	R2	•	1st	•	R2	Q			5
United Arab Emirates	AFC	•	•	•	•	•	•	•	•	•	•	R2	•	•	QF	•	•	QF	•	•	•	•	•	•	•	•			3
United States	CONCACAF	•	•	R1	R1	•	R1	4th	•	QF	•	R2	R2	R2	QF	R2	QF	R1	•	R1	QF	QF	QF	QF	QF	Q			19
Uruguay	CONMEBOL	4th	3rd	QF	QF	•	•	•	R1	QF	•	2nd	4th	•	•	•	R2	R2	R1	2nd	R2	4th	R2	1st	•				16
Uzbekistan	AFC									•	•	•	•	•	R1	•	•	R1	•	QF	QF	•	•	R2	•	Q			6
Vanuatu	OFC	×	×	×	×	×	×	×	•	×	•	×	•	•	•	•	•	×	•	•	•	R1	•	•	•	•			1
Venezuela	CONMEBOL	•	•	•	•	•	•	•	•	•	•	•	•	•	•	•	•	R2	•	•	•	2nd	•	•	•				2
Vietnam	AFC	×	×	×	×	×	×	×	×	×	×	•	•	•	•	•	•	•	•	•	•	R1	•	•	•	•			1
Zambia	CAF	×	×	×	×	•	•	×	•	×	•	•	R1	•	•	•	R2	•	•	•	•	QF	•	•	•	•			3
Team	Confederation	1977 (Tunisia) (16)	1979 (Japan) (16)	1981 (Australia) (16)	1983 (Mexico) (16)	1985 (Soviet Union) (16)	1987 (Chile) (16)	1989 (Saudi Arabia) (16)	1991 (Portugal) (16)	1993 (Australia) (16)	1995 (Qatar) (16)	1997 (Malaysia) (24)	1999 (Nigeria) (24)	2001 (Argentina) (24)	2003 (United Arab Emirates) (24)	2005 (Netherlands) (24)	2007 (Canada) (24)	2009 (Egypt) (24)	2011 (Colombia) (24)	2013 (Turkey) (24)	2015 (New Zealand) (24)	2017 (South Korea) (24)	2019 (Poland) (24)	2023 (Argentina) (24)	2025 (Chile) (24)	2027 (Azerbaijan) (Uzbekistan) (24)	2029 (Armenia) (Georgia (country)) (24)	2031 (24)	Total

== Teams that have finished in the top four ==
Team	Titles	Runners-up	Third place	Fourth place
Argentina	6 (1979, 1995, 1997, 2001, 2005, 2007)	2 (1983, 2025)		1 (2003)
Brazil	5 (1983, 1985, 1993, 2003, 2011)	4 (1991, 1995, 2009, 2015)	3 (1977, 1989, 2005)	
Portugal	2 (1989, 1991)	1 (2011)	1 (1995)	
Serbia^{1}	2 (1987, 2015)			
Uruguay	1 (2023)	2 (1997, 2013)	1 (1979)	3 (1977, 1999, 2017)
Ghana	1 (2009)	2 (1993, 2001)	1 (2013)	1 (1997)
Spain	1 (1999)	2 (1985, 2003)		1 (1995)
Russia^{2}	1 (1977)	1 (1979)	1 (1991)	1 (1985)
Germany^{3}	1 (1981)	1 (1987)		
England	1 (2017)		1 (1993)	1 (1981)
France	1 (2013)			2 (2011, 2025)
Morocco	1 (2025)			1 (2005)
Ukraine	1 (2019)			
Nigeria		2 (1989, 2005)	1 (1985)	
Italy		1 (2023)	1 (2017)	1 (2019)
Mexico		1 (1977)	1 (2011)	
South Korea		1 (2019)		2 (1983, 2023)
Qatar		1 (1981)		
Japan		1 (1999)		
Czech Republic		1 (2007)		
Venezuela		1 (2017)		
Mali			2 (1999, 2015)	
Colombia			2 (2003, 2025)	
Poland			1 (1983)	1 (1979)
Chile			1 (2007)	1 (1987)
Romania			1 (1981)	
East Germany			1 (1987)	
Republic of Ireland			1 (1997)	
Egypt			1 (2001)	
Hungary			1 (2009)	
Ecuador			1 (2019)	
Israel			1 (2023)	
Australia				2 (1991, 1993)
United States				1 (1989)
Paraguay				1 (2001)
Austria				1 (2007)
Costa Rica				1 (2009)
Iraq				1 (2013)
Senegal				1 (2015)

1 = includes results representing Yugoslavia
2 = includes results representing Soviet Union
3 = includes results representing West Germany

== Results of defending champions ==
Year	Defending champions	Finished
1979	Soviet Union	Runners-up
1981	Argentina	Group stage
1983	West Germany	Did not qualify
1985	Brazil	Champions
1987	Brazil	Quarter-finals
1989	Yugoslavia	Did not qualify
1991	Portugal	Champions
1993	Portugal	Group stage
1995	Brazil	Runners-up
1997	Argentina	Champions
1999	Argentina	Round of 16
2001	Spain	Did not qualify
2003	Argentina	Fourth place
2005	Brazil	Third place
2007	Argentina	Champions
2009	Argentina	Did not qualify
2011	Ghana	Did not qualify
2013	Brazil	Did not qualify
2015	France	Did not qualify
2017	Serbia	Did not qualify
2019	England	Did not qualify
2023	Ukraine	Did not qualify
2025	Uruguay	Did not qualify
2027	Morocco	

== Results of host nations ==
Year	Host nation	Finish
1977	Tunisia	Group stage
1979	Japan	Group stage
1981	Australia	Quarter-finals
1983	Mexico	Group stage
1985	Soviet Union	Fourth place
1987	Chile	Fourth place
1989	Saudi Arabia	Group stage
1991	Portugal	Champions
1993	Australia	Fourth place
1995	Qatar	Group stage
1997	Malaysia	Group stage
1999	Nigeria	Quarter-finals
2001	Argentina	Champions
2003	United Arab Emirates	Quarter-finals
2005	Netherlands	Quarter-finals
2007	Canada	Group stage
2009	Egypt	Quarter-finals
2011	Colombia	Quarter-finals
2013	Turkey	Round of 16
2015	New Zealand	Round of 16
2017	South Korea	Round of 16
2019	Poland	Round of 16
2023	Argentina	Round of 16
2025	Chile	Round of 16
2027	Azerbaijan	
2027	Uzbekistan	
2029	Armenia	
2029	Georgia	

== Results of confederations ==
— Hosting confederation

=== Overview ===
Confederation	1st	2nd	3rd	4th	Top 8	Top 16
CONMEBOL	12	9	8	6	49	52
UEFA	10	7	10	8	66	66
CAF	2	4	5	3	25	42
AFC	0	3	0	3	19	28
CONCACAF	0	1	1	2	21	27
OFC	0	0	0	2	4	6

=== AFC ===
	1977 (Tunisia) (16)	1979 (Japan) (16)	1981 (Australia) (16)	1983 (Mexico) (16)	1985 (Soviet Union) (16)	1987 (Chile) (16)	1989 (Saudi Arabia) (16)	1991 (Portugal) (16)	1993 (Australia) (16)	1995 (Qatar) (16)	1997 (Malaysia) (24)	1999 (Nigeria) (24)	2001 (Argentina) (24)	2003 (United Arab Emirates) (24)	2005 (Netherlands) (24)	2007 (Canada) (24)	2009 (Egypt) (24)	2011 (Colombia) (24)	2013 (Turkey) (24)	2015 (New Zealand) (24)	2017 (South Korea) (24)	2019 (Poland) (24)	2023 (Argentina) (24)	2025 (Chile) (24)	2027 (Azerbaijan) (Uzbekistan) (24)	2029 (Armenia) (Georgia (country)) (24)	Total
Teams	2	3	2	2	2	2	3	2	2	3	5	4	4	5	4	4	4	4	4	4	5	4	4	4	5	4	91
Top 16	—	—	—	—	—	—	—	—	—	—	2	1	1	3	3	1	2	2	3	1	3	2	2	2			28
Top 8	—	0	1	1	1	0	1	2	0	1	1	1	0	2	0	0	2	0	3	1	0	1	1	0			19
Top 4	0	0	1	1	0	0	0	0	0	0	0	1	0	0	0	0	0	0	1	0	0	1	1	0			6
Top 2	0	0	1	0	0	0	0	0	0	0	0	1	0	0	0	0	0	0	0	0	0	1	0	0			3
1st																											0
2nd			(Qatar)									(Japan)										(South Korea)					3
3rd																											0
4th				(South Korea)															(Iraq)				(South Korea)				3

=== CAF ===
	1977 (Tunisia) (16)	1979 (Japan) (16)	1981 (Australia) (16)	1983 (Mexico) (16)	1985 (Soviet Union) (16)	1987 (Chile) (16)	1989 (Saudi Arabia) (16)	1991 (Portugal) (16)	1993 (Australia) (16)	1995 (Qatar) (16)	1997 (Malaysia) (24)	1999 (Nigeria) (24)	2001 (Argentina) (24)	2003 (United Arab Emirates) (24)	2005 (Netherlands) (24)	2007 (Canada) (24)	2009 (Egypt) (24)	2011 (Colombia) (24)	2013 (Turkey) (24)	2015 (New Zealand) (24)	2017 (South Korea) (24)	2019 (Poland) (24)	2023 (Argentina) (24)	2025 (Chile) (24)	2027 (Azerbaijan) (Uzbekistan) (24)	2029 (Armenia) (Georgia (country)) (24)	Total
Teams	3	2	2	2	2	2	2	2	2	2	4	5	4	4	4	4	5	4	4	4	4	4	4	4	4	4	87
Top 16	—	—	—	—	—	—	—	—	—	—	2	4	3	3	2	4	4	3	2	4	2	3	3	3			42
Top 8	—	1	1	0	1	0	1	0	1	1	1	3	2	0	2	1	1	1	1	2	1	2	1	1			25
Top 4	0	0	0	0	1	0	1	0	1	0	1	1	2	0	2	0	1	0	1	2	0	0	0	1			14
Top 2	0	0	0	0	0	0	1	0	1	0	0	0	1	0	1	0	1	0	0	0	0	0	0	1			6
1st																	(Ghana)							(Morocco)			2
2nd							(Nigeria)		(Ghana)				(Ghana)		(Nigeria)												4
3rd					(Nigeria)							(Mali)	(Egypt)						(Ghana)	(Mali)							5
4th											(Ghana)				(Morocco)					(Senegal)							3

=== CONCACAF ===
	1977 (Tunisia) (16)	1979 (Japan) (16)	1981 (Australia) (16)	1983 (Mexico) (16)	1985 (Soviet Union) (16)	1987 (Chile) (16)	1989 (Saudi Arabia) (16)	1991 (Portugal) (16)	1993 (Australia) (16)	1995 (Qatar) (16)	1997 (Malaysia) (24)	1999 (Nigeria) (24)	2001 (Argentina) (24)	2003 (United Arab Emirates) (24)	2005 (Netherlands) (24)	2007 (Canada) (24)	2009 (Egypt) (24)	2011 (Colombia) (24)	2013 (Turkey) (24)	2015 (New Zealand) (24)	2017 (South Korea) (24)	2019 (Poland) (24)	2023 (Argentina) (24)	2025 (Chile) (24)	2027 (Azerbaijan) (Uzbekistan) (24)	2029 (Armenia) (Georgia (country)) (24)	Total
Teams	2	2	2	3	2	2	2	2	2	2	4	4	4	4	4	5	4	4	4	4	4	4	4	4	4	4	86
Top 16	—	—	—	—	—	—	—	—	—	—	3	3	2	2	1	2	1	3	1	1	3	2	1	2			27
Top 8	—	0	2	0	1	0	1	1	2	0	0	1	0	2	0	2	1	1	0	1	2	1	1	2			21
Top 4	1	0	0	0	0	0	1	0	0	0	0	0	0	0	0	0	1	1	0	0	0	0	0	0			4
Top 2	1	0	0	0	0	0	0	0	0	0	0	0	0	0	0	0	0	0	0	0	0	0	0	0			1
1st																											0
2nd	(Mexico)																										1
3rd																		(Mexico)									1
4th							(United States)										(Costa Rica)										2

=== CONMEBOL ===
	1977 (Tunisia) (16)	1979 (Japan) (16)	1981 (Australia) (16)	1983 (Mexico) (16)	1985 (Soviet Union) (16)	1987 (Chile) (16)	1989 (Saudi Arabia) (16)	1991 (Portugal) (16)	1993 (Australia) (16)	1995 (Qatar) (16)	1997 (Malaysia) (24)	1999 (Nigeria) (24)	2001 (Argentina) (24)	2003 (United Arab Emirates) (24)	2005 (Netherlands) (24)	2007 (Canada) (24)	2009 (Egypt) (24)	2011 (Colombia) (24)	2013 (Turkey) (24)	2015 (New Zealand) (24)	2017 (South Korea) (24)	2019 (Poland) (24)	2023 (Argentina) (24)	2025 (Chile) (24)	2027 (Azerbaijan) (Uzbekistan) (24)	2029 (Armenia) (Georgia (country)) (24)	Total
Teams	3	3	3	3	3	3	3	3	3	3	4	4	5	4	4	4	4	5	4	4	4	4	5	5	4	4	98
Top 16	—	—	—	—	—	—	—	—	—	—	3	3	4	4	4	4	4	4	4	3	2	4	5	4			52
Top 8	—	3	0	3	2	2	3	1	2	2	3	2	3	3	2	2	1	3	2	1	2	2	3	2			49
Top 4	2	2	0	2	1	1	1	1	1	2	2	1	2	3	2	2	1	1	1	1	2	1	1	2			35
Top 2	0	1	0	2	1	0	0	1	1	2	2	0	1	1	1	1	1	1	1	1	1	0	1	1			21
1st		(Argentina)		(Brazil)	(Brazil)				(Brazil)	(Argentina)	(Argentina)		(Argentina)	(Brazil)	(Argentina)	(Argentina)		(Brazil)					(Uruguay)				12
2nd				(Argentina)				(Brazil)		(Brazil)	(Uruguay)						(Brazil)		(Uruguay)	(Brazil)	(Venezuela)			(Argentina)			9
3rd	(Brazil)	(Uruguay)					(Brazil)							(Colombia)	(Brazil)	(Chile)						(Ecuador)		(Colombia)			8
4th	(Uruguay)					(Chile)						(Uruguay)	(Paraguay)	(Argentina)							(Uruguay)						6

=== OFC ===
	1977 (Tunisia) (16)	1979 (Japan) (16)	1981 (Australia) (16)	1983 (Mexico) (16)	1985 (Soviet Union) (16)	1987 (Chile) (16)	1989 (Saudi Arabia) (16)	1991 (Portugal) (16)	1993 (Australia) (16)	1995 (Qatar) (16)	1997 (Malaysia) (24)	1999 (Nigeria) (24)	2001 (Argentina) (24)	2003 (United Arab Emirates) (24)	2005 (Netherlands) (24)	2007 (Canada) (24)	2009 (Egypt) (24)	2011 (Colombia) (24)	2013 (Turkey) (24)	2015 (New Zealand) (24)	2017 (South Korea) (24)	2019 (Poland) (24)	2023 (Argentina) (24)	2025 (Chile) (24)	2027 (Azerbaijan) (Uzbekistan) (24)	2029 (Armenia) (Georgia (country)) (24)	Total
Teams	0	0	1	1	1	1	0	1	1	1	1	1	1	1	1	1	1	1	1	2	2	2	2	2	1	1	28
Top 16	—	—	—	—	—	—	—	—	—	—	1	0	0	1	0	0	0	0	0	1	1	1	1	0			6
Top 8	—	0	1	0	0	0	0	1	1	1	0	0	0	0	0	0	0	0	0	0	0	0	0	0			4
Top 4	0	0	0	0	0	0	0	1	1	0	0	0	0	0	0	0	0	0	0	0	0	0	0	0			2
Top 2	0	0	0	0	0	0	0	0	0	0	0	0	0	0	0	0	0	0	0	0	0	0	0	0			0
1st																											0
2nd																											0
3rd																											0
4th								(Australia)	(Australia)																		2

=== UEFA ===
	1977 (Tunisia) (16)	1979 (Japan) (16)	1981 (Australia) (16)	1983 (Mexico) (16)	1985 (Soviet Union) (16)	1987 (Chile) (16)	1989 (Saudi Arabia) (16)	1991 (Portugal) (16)	1993 (Australia) (16)	1995 (Qatar) (16)	1997 (Malaysia) (24)	1999 (Nigeria) (24)	2001 (Argentina) (24)	2003 (United Arab Emirates) (24)	2005 (Netherlands) (24)	2007 (Canada) (24)	2009 (Egypt) (24)	2011 (Colombia) (24)	2013 (Turkey) (24)	2015 (New Zealand) (24)	2017 (South Korea) (24)	2019 (Poland) (24)	2023 (Argentina) (24)	2025 (Chile) (24)	2027 (Azerbaijan) (Uzbekistan) (24)	2029 (Armenia) (Georgia (country)) (24)	Total
Teams	6	6	6	6	7	6	6	6	6	5	6	6	6	6	7	6	6	6	7	6	5	6	5	5	5	6	154
Top 16	—	—	—	—	—	—	—	—	—	—	5	4	5	3	5	5	5	4	6	6	5	4	4	5			66
Top 8	—	4	3	4	3	6	2	3	2	3	3	1	3	1	4	3	3	3	2	3	3	2	2	3			66
Top 4	1	2	3	1	2	3	1	2	1	2	1	1	0	1	0	2	1	2	1	1	2	2	2	1			35
Top 2	1	1	1	0	1	2	1	1	0	0	0	1	0	1	0	1	0	1	1	1	1	1	1	0			17
1st	(Soviet Union)		(West Germany)			(Socialist Federal Republic of Yugoslavia)	(Portugal)	(Portugal)				(Spain)							(France)	(Serbia)	(England)	(Ukraine)					10
2nd		(Soviet Union)			(Spain)	(West Germany)								(Spain)		(Czech Republic)		(Portugal)					(Italy)				7
3rd			(Romania)	(Poland)		(East Germany)		(Soviet Union)	(England)	(Portugal)	(Republic of Ireland)						(Hungary)				(Italy)		(Israel)				10
4th		(Poland)	(England)		(Soviet Union)					(Spain)						(Austria)		(France)				(Italy)		(France)			8

== Awards ==
At the end of each FIFA U-20 World Cup tournament, several awards are presented to the players and teams which have distinguished themselves in various aspects of the game.

There are four awards:

- the Golden Ball (commercially termed "adidas Golden Ball") for best player assigned by members of the media;
- the Golden Boot (commercially termed "adidas Golden Boot" for best scorer;
- the Golden Glove Award (commercially termed "adidas Golden Glove" for the best goalkeeper assigned since 2009 FIFA U-20 World Cup;
- the FIFA Fair Play Trophy for the team that advanced to the second round with the best record of fair play;

=== Golden Ball ===
The Adidas Golden Ball award is awarded to the player who plays the most outstanding football during the tournament. It is selected by the media poll. Since the 2007 tournament, those who finish as runners-up in the vote receive the Silver Ball and Bronze Ball awards as the second and third most outstanding players in the tournament respectively.

World Cup	Golden Ball	Silver Ball	Bronze Ball	Ref(s)
1977 Tunisia	(Soviet Union) Volodymyr Bessonov	(Brazil) Júnior Brasília	(Brazil) Cléber	
1979 Japan	(Argentina) Diego Maradona	(Paraguay) Romerito	(Argentina) Ramón Díaz	
1981 Australia	(Romania) Romulus Gabor	(West Germany) Michael Zorc	(West Germany) Roland Wohlfarth	
1983 Mexico	(Brazil) Geovani	(Argentina) Roberto Oscar Zárate	(Argentina) Luis Islas	
1985 Soviet Union	(Brazil) Paulo Silas	(Brazil) Gérson	(Spain) Juan Carlos Unzué	
1987 Chile	(Socialist Federal Republic of Yugoslavia) Robert Prosinečki	(Socialist Federal Republic of Yugoslavia) Zvonimir Boban	(West Germany) Marcel Witeczek	
1989 Saudi Arabia	(Brazil) Bismarck	(United States) Kasey Keller	(Nigeria) Christopher Nwosu	
1991 Portugal	(Portugal) Emílio Peixe	(Brazil) Giovane Élber	(Portugal) Paulo Torres	
1993 Australia	(Brazil) Adriano	Not awarded	Not awarded	
1995 Qatar	(Brazil) Caio	(Portugal) Dani	(Argentina) Joaquín Irigoytía	
1997 Malaysia	(Uruguay) Nicolás Olivera	(Uruguay) Marcelo Zalayeta	(Argentina) Pablo Aimar	
1999 Nigeria	(Mali) Seydou Keita	(Nigeria) Pius Ikedia	(Spain) Pablo Couñago	
2001 Argentina	(Argentina) Javier Saviola	(Argentina) Andrés D'Alessandro	(France) Djibril Cissé	
2003 United Arab Emirates	(United Arab Emirates) Ismail Matar	(Brazil) Dudu	(Brazil) Dani Alves	
2005 Netherlands	(Argentina) Lionel Messi	(Nigeria) John Obi Mikel	(Nigeria) Taye Taiwo	
2007 Canada	(Argentina) Sergio Agüero	(Argentina) Maxi Moralez	(Mexico) Giovani dos Santos	
2009 Egypt	(Ghana) Dominic Adiyiah	(Brazil) Alex Teixeira	(Brazil) Giuliano	
2011 Colombia	(Brazil) Henrique Almeida	(Portugal) Nélson Oliveira	(Mexico) Jorge Enríquez	
2013 Turkey	(France) Paul Pogba	(Uruguay) Nicolás López	(Ghana) Clifford Aboagye	
2015 New Zealand	(Mali) Adama Traoré	(Brazil) Danilo	(Serbia) Sergej Milinković-Savić	
2017 South Korea	(England) Dominic Solanke	(Uruguay) Federico Valverde	(Venezuela) Yangel Herrera	
2019 Poland	(South Korea) Lee Kang-in	(Ukraine) Serhiy Buletsa	(Ecuador) Gonzalo Plata	
2023 Argentina	(Italy) Cesare Casadei	(Uruguay) Alan Matturro	(South Korea) Lee Seung-won	
2025 Chile	(Morocco) Othmane Maamma	(Morocco) Yassir Zabiri	(Argentina) Milton Delgado	
2027 Azerbaijan/Uzbekistan				
2029 Armenia/Georgia				

=== Golden Boot ===
The Golden Boot (known commercially as the Adidas Golden Shoe) is awarded to the top goalscorer of the tournament. If more than one players are equal by same goals, the players will be selected based by the most assists made and, if still tied, less playing minutes recorded during the tournament.

World Cup	Golden Boot	Goals	Silver Boot	Goals	Bronze Boot	Goals	Ref(s)
1977 Tunisia	(Brazil) Guina	4	(Iraq) Hussein Saeed	3	(Mexico) Luis Plascencia	3	
1979 Japan	(Argentina) Ramón Díaz	8	(Argentina) Diego Maradona	6	(Poland) Andrzej Palasz	5	
1981 Australia	(Australia) Mark Koussas	4	(Egypt) Taher Amer	4	(West Germany) Ralf Loose	4	
1983 Mexico	(Brazil) Geovani	6	(Poland) Joachim Klemenz	5	(Argentina) Jorge Luis Gabrich	4	
1985 Soviet Union	(Spain) Sebastián Losada	3	(Spain) Fernando	3	(Nigeria) Odiaka Monday	3	
1987 Chile	(West Germany) Marcel Witeczek	7	(Socialist Federal Republic of Yugoslavia) Davor Šuker	6	(Chile) Camilo Pino	5	
1989 Saudi Arabia	(Soviet Union) Oleg Salenko	5	(Brazil) Marcelo Henrique	3	(Nigeria) Christopher Ohen	3	
1991 Portugal	(Soviet Union) Sergei Sherbakov	5	(Spain) Ismael Urzaiz	4	(Mexico) Pedro Pineda	4	
1993 Australia	(Colombia) Henry Zambrano	3	(United States) Chris Faklaris	3	(Mexico) Vicente Nieto	3	
1995 Qatar	(Spain) Joseba Etxeberria	7	(Brazil) Caio	5	(Portugal) Dani	4	
1997 Malaysia	(Brazil) Adaílton	10	(France) David Trezeguet	5	(Australia) Kostas Salapasidis	4	
1999 Nigeria	(Spain) Pablo Couñago	5	(Mali) Mahamadou Dissa	5	(United States) Taylor Twellman	4	
2001 Argentina	(Argentina) Javier Saviola	11	(Brazil) Adriano	6	(France) Djibril Cissé	6	
2003 United Arab Emirates	(United States) Eddie Johnson	4	(Japan) Daisuke Sakata	4	(Argentina) Fernando Cavenaghi	4	
2005 Netherlands	(Argentina) Lionel Messi	6	(Spain) Fernando Llorente	5	(Ukraine) Oleksandr Aliyev	5	
2007 Canada	(Argentina) Sergio Agüero	6	(Spain) Adrián	5	(Argentina) Maximiliano Moralez	4	
2009 Egypt	(Ghana) Dominic Adiyiah	8	(Hungary) Vladimir Koman	5	(Spain) Aarón	4	
2011 Colombia	(Brazil) Henrique Almeida	5	(Spain) Álvaro Vázquez	5	(France) Alexandre Lacazette	5	
2013 Turkey	(Ghana) Ebenezer Assifuah	6	(Portugal) Bruma	5	(Spain) Jesé	5	
2015 New Zealand	(Ukraine) Viktor Kovalenko	5	(Hungary) Bence Mervo	5	(Germany) Marc Stendera	4	
2017 South Korea	(Italy) Riccardo Orsolini	5	(United States) Josh Sargent	4	(France) Jean-Kévin Augustin	4	
2019 Poland	(Norway) Erling Haaland	9	(Ukraine) Danylo Sikan	4	(Senegal) Amadou Sagna	4	
2023 Argentina	(Italy) Cesare Casadei	7	(Brazil) Marcos Leonardo	5	(Colombia) Óscar Cortés	4	
2025 Chile	(United States) Benjamin Cremaschi	5	(Colombia) Néiser Villarreal	5	(France) Lucas Michal	5	
2027 Azerbaijan/Uzbekistan							
2029 Armenia/Georgia							

=== Golden Glove ===
The Golden Glove is awarded to the best goalkeeper of the tournament.

World Cup	Golden Gloves	Ref(s)
2009 Egypt	(Costa Rica) Esteban Alvarado	
2011 Colombia	(Portugal) Mika	
2013 Turkey	(Uruguay) Guillermo de Amores	
2015 New Zealand	(Serbia) Predrag Rajković	
2017 South Korea	(England) Freddie Woodman	
2019 Poland	(Ukraine) Andriy Lunin	
2023 Argentina	(Italy) Sebastiano Desplanches	
2025 Chile	(Argentina) Santino Barbi	
2027 Azerbaijan/Uzbekistan		
2029 Armenia/Georgia		

=== FIFA Fair Play Award ===
FIFA Fair Play Award is given to the team who has the best fair play record during the tournament with the criteria set by FIFA Fair Play Committee.

Tournament	FIFA Fair Play Award	Ref(s)
1977 Tunisia	Brazil	
1979 Japan	Poland	
1981 Australia	Australia	
1983 Mexico	South Korea	
1985 USSR	Colombia	
1987 Chile	West Germany	
1989 Saudi Arabia	United States	
1991 Portugal	Soviet Union	
1993 Australia	England	
1995 Qatar	Japan	
1997 Malaysia	Argentina	
1999 Nigeria	Croatia	
2001 Argentina	Argentina	
2003 United Arab Emirates	Colombia	
2005 Netherlands	Colombia	
2007 Canada	Japan	
2009 Egypt	Brazil	
2011 Colombia	Nigeria	
2013 Turkey	Spain	
2015 New Zealand	Ukraine	
2017 South Korea	Mexico	
2019 Poland	Japan	
2023 Argentina	United States	
2025 Chile	United States	
2027 Azerbaijan/Uzbekistan		
2029 Armenia/Georgia		

== Records and statistics ==
Most World Cup appearances (as of 2025)
20, Brazil
Most consecutive finals tournaments
16, Brazil (1981–2011)
Most tournament wins (player)
2, three players:

- Fernando Brassard (Portugal; 1989 and 1991)
- João Vieira Pinto (Portugal; 1989 and 1991)
- Sergio Agüero (Argentina; 2005 and 2007)

Largest win margin in one match
12 goals (Norway 12–0 Honduras, 30 May 2019)
Most goals scored in a match by a single player
9 goals (Erling Haaland for Norway against Honduras, 30 May 2019)

== See also ==
- FIFA U-17 World Cup records and statistics
