= 1977 AFC Youth Championship =

Tournament details
- Host country: Iran
- Dates: 15–28 April
- Teams: 13

Final positions
- Champions: Iraq (2nd title)
- Runners-up: Iran
- Third place: Bahrain
- Fourth place: Japan

The 1977 AFC Youth Championship was held between April 15 and April 28 in Iran. It was won by Iraq 4-3 over Iran in Aryamehr Stadium in Tehran in front of 100,000 spectators. Both teams qualified for 1977 FIFA World Youth Championship.

== Teams ==
The following teams entered the tournament:

- Afghanistan
- Bahrain
- Bangladesh
- Hong Kong
- India
- Iran
- Iraq
- Japan
- Jordan
- Malaysia
- Saudi Arabia
- Singapore
- South Korea

== Venues ==
Tehran
Aryamehr Stadium
Capacity: 100,000
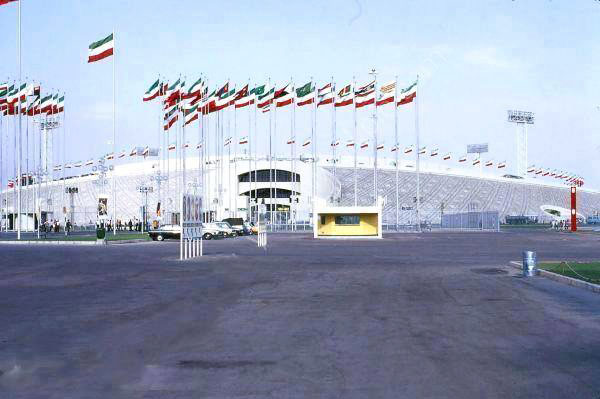

== Group stage ==
=== Group A ===
Teams	GP	W	D	L	GF	GA	GD	Pts
Iran	2	2	0	0	11	0	+11	4
Afghanistan	2	0	1	1	0	3	–3	1
Singapore	2	0	1	1	0	8	–8	1

Iran 8 - 0 Singapore

Iran 3 - 0 Afghanistan

Afghanistan 0 - 0 Singapore

=== Group B ===
Teams	GP	W	D	L	GF	GA	GD	Pts
Iraq	2	2	0	0	7	0	+7	4
India	2	1	0	1	4	4	0	2
Bangladesh	2	0	0	2	0	7	–7	0

Iraq 4 - 0 India

Iraq 3 - 0 Bangladesh

India 4 - 0 Bangladesh

=== Group C ===
Teams	GP	W	D	L	GF	GA	GD	Pts
Japan	2	1	1	0	6	1	+5	3
Bahrain	2	1	1	0	4	2	+2	3
Hong Kong	2	0	0	2	1	8	–7	0

Japan 5 - 0 Hong Kong

Japan 1 - 1 Bahrain

Bahrain 3 - 1 Hong Kong

=== Group D ===
Teams	GP	W	D	L	GF	GA	GD	Pts
Saudi Arabia	3	2	1	0	5	0	+5	5
South Korea	3	1	2	0	3	0	+3	4
Malaysia	3	0	2	1	1	4	–3	2
Jordan	3	0	1	2	1	6	–5	1

Saudi Arabia 2 - 0 Jordan

South Korea 0 - 0 Malaysia

South Korea 0 - 0 Saudi Arabia

Malaysia 1 - 1 Jordan

South Korea 3 - 0 Jordan

Saudi Arabia 3 - 0 Malaysia

== Quarterfinals ==
Iran 3 – 0 India

Iraq 5 – 1 Afghanistan

Japan 0 – 0 South Korea 3–1 after penalties

Saudi Arabia 2 – 2 Bahrain 5–6 after penalties

== Semifinals ==
Iran 2 - 1 Japan

Iraq 3 - 0 Bahrain

== Third place match ==
Bahrain 3 - 1 Japan

== Final ==
April 28, 1977

Iraq	4 – 3	Iran
Luaibi 29'; Abdul-Sahib 38'; Saeed 74', 80'		Asheri 7'; Hassanzadeh 55'; Suri 78'

Aryamehr Stadium, Tehran
Attendance: 100,000

1977 AFC Youth Championship

Iraq
Second title

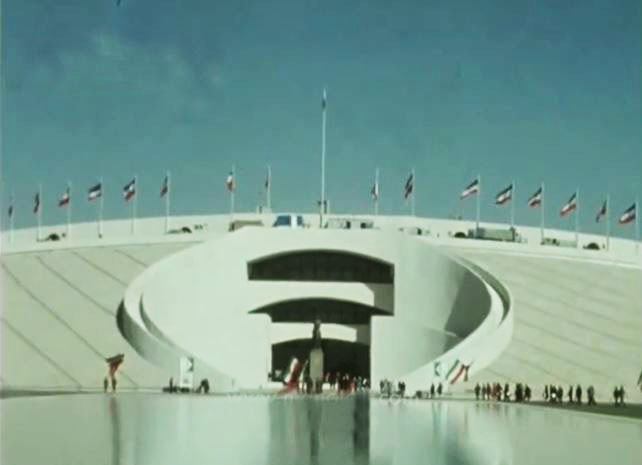

== Qualification to World Youth Championship ==
The two best performing teams qualified for the 1977 FIFA World Youth Championship.

- Iraq
- Iran
