= 1977 FIFA World Youth Championship =

بطولة العالم للشباب لكرة القدم 1977

Tournament details
- Host country: Tunisia
- Dates: 27 June – 10 July
- Teams: 16 (from 5 confederations)
- Venues: 4 (in 3 host cities)

Final positions
- Champions: Soviet Union (1st title)
- Runners-up: Mexico
- Third place: Brazil
- Fourth place: Uruguay

Tournament statistics
- Matches played: 28
- Goals scored: 70 (2.5 per match)
- Top scorer: (Brazil) Guina (4 goals)
- Best player: (Soviet Union) Vladimir Bessonov
- Fair play award: Brazil

The 1977 FIFA World Youth Championship was the inaugural staging of the FIFA World Youth Championship, hosted by Tunisia from 27 June to 10 July 1977, in three venues — Tunis, Sousse and Sfax. The 28 matches played were the smallest number in tournament history. The USSR U20s defeated Mexico U20s in a penalty shootout, in the final held at Tunis's Stade El Menzah.

The Tournament Committee was chaired by FIFA Vice-President Harry Cavan, who had spearheaded the creation of the World Youth Championship.

== Qualification ==
Confederation	Qualifying tournament	Qualifier(s)
AFC (Asia)	1977 AFC Youth Championship	Iran; Iraq
CAF (Africa)	Host nation	Tunisia
CAF (Africa)	1977 African Youth Qualifying for World Cup	Ivory Coast; Morocco
CONCACAF (North, Central America & Caribbean)	1976 CONCACAF U-20 Tournament	Honduras; Mexico
CONMEBOL (South America)	1977 South American Youth Championship	Brazil; Paraguay; Uruguay
UEFA (Europe)	1976 UEFA European Under-18 Football Championship	Austria; France; Hungary; Italy; Soviet Union; Spain

== Squads ==
For a list of all squads that began play in the group stage of the tournament, see 1977 FIFA World Youth Championship squads

== Venues ==
Tunis	1977 FIFA World Youth Championship is located in Tunisia	Tunis
Stade El Menzah	1977 FIFA World Youth Championship is located in Tunisia	Stade Chedly Zouiten
Capacity: 45,000	1977 FIFA World Youth Championship is located in Tunisia	Capacity: 18,000
Sousse	1977 FIFA World Youth Championship is located in Tunisia	Sfax
Stade Olympique de Sousse	1977 FIFA World Youth Championship is located in Tunisia	Stade Ameur El-Gargouri
Capacity: 10,000	1977 FIFA World Youth Championship is located in Tunisia	Capacity: 4,000

== Group stage ==
The group winners advanced directly to the semifinals.

=== Group A ===
Pos	Team	Pld	W	D	L	GF	GA	GD	Pts	Group stage result
1	Mexico	3	1	2	0	8	2	+6	4	Advance to semi-finals
2	Spain	3	1	1	1	3	3	0	3	
3	France	3	1	1	1	3	3	0	3	
4	Tunisia (H)	3	1	0	2	1	7	−6	2	

(H) Hosts
27 June 1977
12:00

France	1–2	Spain
Bacconnier 75'	(Report)	Escobar 29'; Casas 60'

Stade El Menzah, Tunis
Referee: Orhan Cebe (Turkey)

27 June 1977
16:00

Mexico	6–0	Tunisia
Manzo 46', 47'; Placencia 48', 69', 72'; Garduno 56'	(Report)

Stade El Menzah, Tunis
Referee: Farouk Bouzo (Syria)

30 June 1977
12:00

Spain	1–1	Mexico
Escobar 46'	(Report)	Rodríguez 73'

Stade El Menzah, Tunis
Referee: Franz Woehrer (Austria)

30 June 1977
16:00

Tunisia	0–1	France
	(Report)	Meyer 20'

Stade El Menzah, Tunis
Referee: Arturo Andrés Ithurralde (Argentina)

3 July 1977
12:00

France	1–1	Mexico
Wiss 64'	(Report)	Moses 70'

Stade El Menzah, Tunis
Referee: Gianfranco Menegali (Italy)

3 July 1977
16:00

Spain	0–1	Tunisia
	(Report)	Ben Fattoum 52'

Stade El Menzah, Tunis
Referee: Eldar Azimzade (Soviet Union)

=== Group B ===
Pos	Team	Pld	W	D	L	GF	GA	GD	Pts	Group stage result
1	Uruguay	3	3	0	0	6	1	+5	6	Advance to semi-finals
2	Honduras	3	2	0	1	3	1	+2	4	
3	Hungary	3	1	0	2	3	4	−1	2	
4	Morocco	3	0	0	3	0	6	−6	0	

28 June 1977
12:00

Morocco	0–1	Honduras
	(Report)	Norales 46'

Stade Chedly Zouiten, Tunis
Referee: Gerard Racine (Switzerland)

28 June 1977
16:00

Uruguay	2–1	Hungary
Diogo 15'; Bica 25' (pen.)	(Report)	Péter 17'

Stade Chedly Zouiten, Tunis
Referee: Gianfranco Menegali (Italy)

1 July 1977
12:00

Honduras	0–1	Uruguay
	(Report)	Nadal 29'

Stade Chedly Zouiten, Tunis
Referee: Birame N'Diaye (Senegal)

1 July 1977
16:00

Hungary	2–0	Morocco
Kerekes 26'; Nagy 56'	(Report)

Stade Chedly Zouiten, Tunis
Referee: Arnaldo Coelho (Brazil)

4 July 1977
12:00

Hungary	0–2	Honduras
	(Report)	Yearwood 7'; Duarte 30'

Stade Chedly Zouiten, Tunis
Referee: Sahar El Hawary (Egypt)

4 July 1977
16:00

Uruguay	3–0	Morocco
Nadal 36'; Enrique 44'; Ramos 51'	(Report)

Stade Chedly Zouiten, Tunis
Referee: Farouk Bouzo (Syria)

=== Group C ===
Pos	Team	Pld	W	D	L	GF	GA	GD	Pts	Group stage result
1	Brazil	3	2	1	0	8	2	+6	5	Advance to semi-finals
2	Iran	3	1	1	1	4	5	−1	3	
3	Italy	3	0	2	1	1	3	−2	2	
4	Ivory Coast	3	0	2	1	2	5	−3	2	

27 June 1977
12:00

Italy	1–1	Ivory Coast
Capuzzo 11'	(Report)	Kouassi 77'

Stade Olympique de Sousse, Sousse
Referee: Emmanuel Platopoulos (Greece)

27 June 1977
16:00

Brazil	5–1	Iran
Guina 22', 29', 39'; Paulo Roberto 37'; Júnior Brasília 52'	(Report)	Rajabi 55'

Stade Olympique de Sousse, Sousse
Referee: Michel Vautrot (France)

30 June 1977
12:00

Iran	0–0	Italy
	(Report)

Stade Olympique de Sousse, Sousse
Referee: Lajos Somlai (Hungary)

30 June 1977
16:00

Ivory Coast	1–1	Brazil
Ya Semon 46'	(Report)	Cléber 89'

Stade Olympique de Sousse, Sousse
Referee: Mohamed Kadri (Tunisia)

3 July 1977
12:00

Iran	3–0	Ivory Coast
Asheri 31', 87'; Barzegar 80'	(Report)

Stade Olympique de Sousse, Sousse
Referee: Salem Mahmud Adal (Syria)

3 July 1977
16:00

Brazil	2–0	Italy
Guina 11'; Paulinho 48'	(Report)

Stade Olympique de Sousse, Sousse
Referee: Dusan Maksimovic (Yugoslavia)

=== Group D ===
Pos	Team	Pld	W	D	L	GF	GA	GD	Pts	Group stage result
1	Soviet Union	3	2	1	0	5	2	+3	5	Advance to semi-finals
2	Paraguay	3	2	0	1	6	2	+4	4	
3	Iraq	3	1	0	2	6	8	−2	2	
4	Austria	3	0	1	2	1	6	−5	1	

28 June 1977
12:00

Soviet Union	3–1	Iraq
Petrakov 19', 23'; Bal 39'	(Report)	Luaibi 77'

Stade Ameur El-Gargouri, Sfax
Referee: Ángel Franco Martínez (Spain)

28 June 1977
16:00

Austria	0–1	Paraguay
	(Report)	Morel 62'

Stade Ameur El-Gargouri, Sfax
Referee: Zoubir Benganif (Algeria)

1 July 1977
12:00

Iraq	5–1	Austria
Luaibi 30'; Hussain 34', 38', 90+3'; Hammadi 90+4'	(Report)	Weiss 28'

Stade Ameur El-Gargouri, Sfax
Referee: Tesfaye Gebreyesus (Ethiopia)

1 July 1977
16:00

Paraguay	1–2	Soviet Union
Battaglia 38'	(Report)	Khidiyatullin 29'; Bessonov 59'

Stade Ameur El-Gargouri, Sfax
Referee: Michel Vautrot (France)

4 July 1977
12:00

Paraguay	4–0	Iraq
Salmaniego 26'; López 30', 68'; Giménez 67'	(Report)

Stade Ameur El-Gargouri, Sfax
Referee: Ángel Franco Martínez (Spain)

4 July 1977
16:00

Austria	0–0	Soviet Union
	(Report)

Stade Ameur El-Gargouri, Sfax
Referee: Mohamed Larache (Morocco)

== Knockout stage ==
Semi-finals
6 July – Tunis
Mexico (p)	1 (5)
Brazil	1 (3)
7 July – Tunis
Uruguay	0 (3)
Soviet Union (p)	0 (4)

Final
10 July – Tunis
Mexico	2 (8)
Soviet Union (p)	2 (9)
Third place
9 July – Tunis
Brazil	4
Uruguay	0

=== Semi-finals ===
6 July 1977
12:00

Mexico	1–1 (a.e.t.)	Brazil
Rergis 53'	(Report)	Jorge Luís 59'
Penalties
	5–3

Stade El Menzah, Tunis
Referee: Ángel Franco Martínez (Spain)

7 July 1977
12:00

Uruguay	0–0 (a.e.t.)	Soviet Union
	(Report)
Penalties
	3–4

Stade El Menzah, Tunis
Referee: Gianfranco Menegali (Italy)

=== Third place play-off ===
9 July 1977
12:00

Brazil	4–0	Uruguay
Cléber 13'; Paulo Roberto 30'; Paulinho 53'; Tião 69'	(Report)

Stade El Menzah, Tunis
Referee: Farouk Bouzo (Syria)

=== Final ===
10 July 1977
18:30

Mexico	2–2 (a.e.t.)	Soviet Union
Garduno 50'; Manzo 58'	(Report)	Bessonov 43', 54'
Penalties
	8–9

Stade El Menzah, Tunis
Attendance: 22,000
Referee: Michel Vautrot (France)

== Result ==
FIFA World Youth Championship 1977 winners

Soviet Union
First title

== Awards ==
Golden Shoe	Golden Ball	Fair Play Award
(Brazil) Guina	(Soviet Union) Vladimir Bessonov	Brazil

== Goalscorers ==
Guina of Brazil won the Golden Boot award for scoring four goals. In total, 70 goals were scored by 49 different players, with none of them credited as own goal.

4 goals

- (Brazil) Guina

3 goals

- (Iraq) Hussein Saeed
- (Mexico) Agustín Manzo
- (Mexico) Luis Placencia
- (Soviet Union) Vladimir Bessonov

2 goals

- (Brazil) Cléber
- (Brazil) Paulinho
- (Brazil) Paulo Roberto
- (Iran) Moharam Asheri
- (Iraq) Hussein Luaibi
- (Mexico) Fernando Garduno
- (Paraguay) Pedro López
- (Soviet Union) Valeri Petrakov
- (Spain) Ricardo Escobar Palacios
- (Uruguay) Amaro Nadal

1 goal

- (Austria) Heinz Weiss
- (Brazil) Jorge Luís
- (Brazil) Júnior Brasília
- (Brazil) Tião
- (France) Andre Wiss
- (France) Gerard Bacconnier
- (France) Thierry Meyer
- (Honduras) Gilberto Yearwood
- (Honduras) José Enrique Duarte
- (Honduras) Prudencio Norales
- (Hungary) Imre Nagy
- (Hungary) János Kerekes
- (Hungary) Zoltán Péter
- (Iran) Reza Rajabi
- (Iran) Abdolreza Barzegar
- (Iraq) Haddi Hammadi
- (Italy) Luigi Capuzzo
- (Ivory Coast) Honore Ya Semon
- (Ivory Coast) Lucien Kouassi
- (Mexico) Eduardo Moses
- (Mexico) Eduardo Rergis
- (Mexico) Hugo Rodríguez
- (Paraguay) Eugenio Giménez
- (Paraguay) Domingo Salmaniego
- (Paraguay) Juan Battaglia
- (Paraguay) Víctor Morel
- (Soviet Union) Andrei Bal
- (Soviet Union) Vagiz Khidiyatullin
- (Spain) José Casas
- (Tunisia) Ali Ben Fattoum
- (Uruguay) Alberto Bica
- (Uruguay) Daniel Enrique
- (Uruguay) Venancio Ramos
- (Uruguay) Víctor Diogo

== Final ranking ==
Pos	Team	Pld	W	D	L	GF	GA	GD	Pts	Final result
1	Soviet Union	5	2	3	0	7	4	+3	7	Champions
2	Mexico	5	1	4	0	11	5	+6	6	Runners-up
3	Brazil	5	3	2	0	13	3	+10	8	Third place
4	Uruguay	5	3	1	1	6	5	+1	7	Fourth place
5	Paraguay	3	2	0	1	6	2	+4	4	Eliminated in Group stage
6	Honduras	3	2	0	1	3	1	+2	4	Eliminated in Group stage
7	Spain	3	1	1	1	3	3	0	3	Eliminated in Group stage
7	France	3	1	1	1	3	3	0	3	Eliminated in Group stage
9	Iran	3	1	1	1	4	5	−1	3	Eliminated in Group stage
10	Hungary	3	1	0	2	3	4	−1	2	Eliminated in Group stage
11	Iraq	3	1	0	2	6	8	−2	2	Eliminated in Group stage
12	Italy	3	0	2	1	1	3	−2	2	Eliminated in Group stage
13	Ivory Coast	3	0	2	1	2	5	−3	2	Eliminated in Group stage
14	Tunisia (H)	3	1	0	2	1	7	−6	2	Eliminated in Group stage
15	Austria	3	0	1	2	1	6	−5	1	Eliminated in Group stage
16	Morocco	3	0	0	3	0	6	−6	0	Eliminated in Group stage

Source: rsssf.com
(H) Hosts
