= Hasanzade =

Hasanzade is an Azerbaijani surname. Notable people with the surname include:

- Jahangir Hasanzade (born 1979), Azerbaijani footballer
- Jamila Hasanzade (1947–2022), Azerbaijani writer
- Mirza Huseyn Hasanzade (1869–1947/1948), Azerbaijani teacher
- Nariman Hasanzade (1931–2026), Azerbaijani poet

== See also ==
- Hassanzadeh
