= Hassanzadeh =

Hassanzadeh or Hasanzadeh is an Iranian surname. Notable people with the surname include:

- Ahmad Hassanzadeh (born 1985), Iranian footballer
- Ali Asghar Hassanzadeh (born 1987), Iranian futsal player
- Farhad Hasanzadeh (born 1962), Iranian author and poet
- Khosrow Hassanzadeh (born 1963), Iranian painter
- Mohammad Hassanzadeh (born 1990), Iranian basketball player
- Reza Hassanzadeh (disambiguation), multiple Iranian footballers

== See also ==
- Hasanzade
