= Syrian Football Association =

Governing body of association football in Syria

Syrian Arab Football Association
AFC
- Short name: SFA
- Founded: 1936; 90 years ago
- Headquarters: Al-Fayhaa, Damascus, Syria
- FIFA affiliation: 1937
- AFC affiliation: 1970
- WAFF affiliation: 2001 (founding member)
- President: Firas Tiet
- Website: sfa.sy

The Syrian Arab Football Association (SFA; Arabic: الاتحاد العربي السوري لكرة القدم) is the governing body of football in Syria, controlling the Syrian national teams, the Syrian Premier League, and other domestic competitions. The SFA was founded in 1936 and has been a member of FIFA since 1937, the Asian Football Confederation since 1970, and the Sub-confederation regional body West Asian Football Federation since 2001. Syria is also part of the Union of Arab Football Associations and has been a member since 1974. Syria's team is commonly known as Nosour Qasioun (Arabic: نسور قاسيون, lit. 'Qasioun eagles').

== Affiliation ==
- FIFA (1937)
- AFC (1970)
- Union of Arab Football Associations (1974)
- WAFF (2001)

== Association staff ==
Name	Position	Source
(Syria) Firas Tiet	President	
(Syria) Fadi al-Dabbas	Vice President	
(Syria) Mohamed Mazen Daqouri	General Secretary	
(Syria) Moafak Fathallah	Treasurer	
(Syria) Vacant	Technical Director	
(Spain) José Lana	Team Coach (Men's)	
(Syria) Salim Jabalawi	Team Coach (Women's)	
(Syria) Mohammad Bachar	Media/Communications Manager	
(Syria) Ahmad Fesal	Futsal Coordinator	
(Syria) Mohammed Kanah	Referee Coordinator	

== List of presidents ==
The following is a list of SFA presidents in recent decades.

President	Term
Farouk Bouzo	1982–1994
Farouk Sariaah	2000–2002
Ahmed al-Jaban	2002–2008
Moutassem Ghotouq	2008–2009 (Acting)
Farouk Sariaah	2009–2012
Salah Ramadan	2012–2018
Fadi al-Dabbas	2018–2019
Hatem Al Ghaeeb	2019–2022
Salah Ramadan	2022–2024
Mohamed Mazen Daqouri	2024–2025 (Acting)
Firas Tiet	2025–present

== Management ==
=== League system ===
Tier 1: Syrian Premier League
Tier 2: Syrian League 1st Division
Tier 3: Syrian League 2nd Division
Tier 4: Syrian League 3rd Division

=== Domestic cup ===
- Syrian Cup
- Syrian Super Cup

=== National teams ===
- Syria universal, under-23, under-20, under-17, women's and women's under-20 national association football teams
- Syria national futsal team
- Syria national beach soccer team

== National teams ==
- Syria national football team
- Syria national under-23 football team
- Syria national under-20 football team
- Syria national under-17 football team
- Syria national futsal team
- Syria national beach soccer team
- Syria women's national football team

== Logo ==
Logo of SFA before December 2024

Logo of SFA since December 2024

== See also ==
- List of football stadiums in Syria
- Football in Syria
- Sport in Syria
