= Paulo Roberto =

Paulo Roberto are given names. Notable people with these given names include:

- Paulo Roberto (footballer, born 1958), Brazilian footballer
- Paulo Roberto Falcão, a Brazilian retired footballer and manager
- Paulo Roberto de Oliveira Júnior, a Brazilian retired footballer
- Paulo Roberto Cardoso Rodrigues, a Brazilian footballer
- Paulo Roberto Correia, Brazilian Olympic sprinter
- Paulo Roberto Curtis Costa, a Brazilian retired footballer
- Paulo Roberto Marqués Roris, a Brazilian-born Spanish futsal player
- Paulo Roberto Morais Júnior, a Brazilian footballer
- Paulo Roberto da Silva, a Brazilian footballer
- Paulo Roberto Prestes, a Brazilian retired footballer
- Paulo Roberto Paula, a Brazilian long-distance runner
- Paulo Roberto da Silva Souza, a Brazilian footballer
- Paulo Roberto da Silva Zaltron, a Brazilian footballer
- Paulo Roberto do Carmo, a Brazilian footballer
- Paulo Roberto dos Santos Almeida, a Brazilian footballer
- Paulo Roberto Gonzaga, a Brazilian footballer
- Paulo Roberto (footballer, born May 2005), Brazilian football forward
