= Toninho Quintino =

Brazilian footballer (born 1952)

Antônio "Toninho" Fernandes Quintino (born 27 February 1952) is a Brazilian former professional footballer who played as a forward for clubs in Brazil and Chile.

== Career ==
Born in Florianópolis, Toninho Quintino began playing football with local side Avaí Futebol Clube. He won the Santa Caterina state championship twice with Avaí, but gained fame with Sociedade Esportiva Palmeiras where he won the 1976 Campeonato Paulista.

== Teams ==
- (Brazil) Avaí 1972–1975
- (Brazil) Figueirense 1975
- (Brazil) Palmeiras 1976–1979
- (Brazil) Cruzeiro 1979–1980
- (Brazil) Corinthians 1981
- (Chile) Universidad Católica 1981–1982
- (Brazil) Ponte Preta 1983
- (Brazil) Ferroviária 1983
- (Brazil) Avaí 1984–1986
- (Brazil) XV de Piracicaba 1987
- (Brazil) Aimoré 1987

== Honours ==
Avai

- Campeonato Catarinense: 1973

Palmeiras

- Campeonato Paulista: 1976
- Campeonato Brasileiro runner-up: 1978
