= Farouk Bouzo =

Syrian association football referee

Farouk Bouzo (Arabic: فاروق بوظو; born 3 March 1938 Damascus, Syria) is a retired Syrian international football referee. He pioneered a new style of VAR in Egyptian football.

== Career ==
Farouk Bouzo was a FIFA referee from 1969 until 1980. He officiated an international match in the 1978 FIFA World Cup group stages. He has the distinct honor of being the first Syrian referee to lead a match at a World Cup and the first referee to receive a 10 (highest recognition) grade from his inspector for his great performance in a World Cup match. He also officiated three matches at the 1977 FIFA World Youth Championship. He issued two yellow cards at the 1978 World Cup match between Germany and Mexico (6–0), one to each side.

Date	Match	Team1	Score	Score	Team2	venue
6 June 1978	WC 1978 Group	Germany	6	0	Mexico	Córdoba

== After career ==
He served as Secretary-General of the Syrian Football Association in 1976 and President from 1982 to 1994. After his retirement from refereeing, Bouzo became the National Referee Coordinator and Chairman of the AFC Referees Committee.

== Successes ==
In 1996, he was awarded the FIFA Order of Merit, the highest honor by FIFA.
