= Ameur El-Gargouri Stadium =

Football stadium in Tunisia

Coordinates: 36.83974°N 10.18518°E

- Interactive map of Ameur El-Gargouri Stadium
- Full name: Ameur El-Gargouri Stadium
- Location: Sfax, Tunisia
- Capacity: 4,000
- Surface: Grass

Tenant
- Sfax Railways Sports

Ameur El-Gargouri Stadium is a Tunisian football stadium with the capacity of 4,000. It is in Sfax, Tunisia. It is the stadium of 1977 FIFA World Youth Championship and Sfax Railways Sports.
