= Hussein Luaibi =

Iraqi footballer and coach

Personal information
- Full name: Hussein Luaibi Munshid
- Date of birth: 1 July 1953 (age 73)
- Place of birth: Iraq
- Height: 1.84 m (6 ft 0 in)
- Position: Forward

Team information
- Current team: Al-Naft assistant coach

Senior career*
| Years | Team | Apps | (Gls) |
| 1971–1972 | Al-Najda | | |
| 1972–1973 | Al-Aliyat | | |
| 1973–1979 | Al-Shorta | | |
| 1979–1989 | Al-Tayaran | | |

International career
| 1976 | Iraq military | 2 | (0) |
| 1977–1978 | Iraq U20 | 8 | (5) |
| 1976–1978 | Iraq | 13 | (2) |

Managerial career
- 2003: Al-Quwa Al-Jawiya
- 2010: Al-Naft
- * Club domestic league appearances and goals

Hussein Luaibi (Arabic: حسين لعيبي; born 1953) is an Iraqi football coach and former footballer. He played as a forward.

== Club career ==
Luaibi started playing for Al-Najda FC and then Al-Aliyat FC. He then moved to Al-Shorta, where he played with them for six seasons, then moved to Al-Tayaran and stayed with them for 10 seasons until his retirement in 1989. In 27 years of playing he did not get one color card.

== Asian title and the first Iraqi goal in FIFA U-20 ==
Luaibi played the youth team and won the 1977 AFC Youth Championship in Tehran, than played in the 1977 FIFA World Youth Championship in Tunisia with the first participation of Iraq in the history of the tournament and scored the first goal of an Iraqi player in the history of this tournament, which scored against Soviet Union on 26 June 1977, and scored against Austria too.

== International career ==
On September 5, 1976, Luaibi played his debut with Iraq against Saudi Arabia in fully international match, in the Friendly match in Riyadh, which ended 0-0.

=== International goals ===
Scores and results list Iraq's goal tally first.

| Goal | Date | Venue | Opponent | Score | Result | Competition |
|---|---|---|---|---|---|---|
| 1. | 22 October 1976 | Al-Shaab Stadium, Baghdad | Libya | 2–1 | 3–1 | Friendly |
| 2. | 22 October 1976 | Al-Shaab Stadium, Baghdad | Libya | 3–1 | 3–1 | Friendly |

== Awards ==
- Finalist Pestabola Merdeka 1977 with Iraq
- Asian Youth champion in 1977 with Iraq U-19
- Winner of the Al-Wehdat Championship in 1986 with Al-Tayaran
