= Bill (footballer, born 1953) =

Brazilian footballer

Personal information
- Full name: Oswaldo Faria
- Date of birth: 3 April 1953
- Place of birth: Araguari, Brazil
- Date of death: 22 September 2002 (aged 49)
- Place of death: Aparecida de Goiânia, Brazil
- Height: 1.75 m (5 ft 9 in)
- Position: Forward

Senior career*
Years	Team	Apps	(Gls)
1971–1973	Itumbiara		
1973–1975	Vasco da Gama		
1975–1977	Goiânia		
1978	Internacional		
1979–1981	América (MEX)		
1981–1982	Tampico Madero		
1981	→ Los Angeles Aztecs (loan)		
1982	XV de Jaú		
1982	Goiânia		
1983	Goiás		
1984–1985	Vila Nova		
1985–1986	Atlético Goianiense		
1986–1987	Treze		
1987	Gama		
1987	Patrocinense		
1988	Goiatuba		
1989	Vila Nova		
1990	Itumbiara		
1990–1991	América-GO		
1991	Dom Bosco		
1992	Cristalina		
1992	Itumbiara		
1992	Buritialegrense		
1993	Imperatriz		
1996	Samambaia		
1997–1998	Imperatriz		
1999	Aparecidense		
- * Club domestic league appearances and goals as of 8 October 2024

Oswaldo Faria (3 April 1953 – 22 September 2002), better known as Bill, was a Brazilian professional footballer who played as a forward.

== Career ==
Striker revealed by Itumbiara EC, Bill marked his time with several Brazilian football teams. He was Brazilian champion with Vasco in 1974, semi-finalist in 1978 with Internacional, he is the greatest scorer in the history of Goiânia EC and achieved the curious feat of three state titles in Goiás with three different clubs (Goiás, Vila Nova and Atlético Goianiense), being top scorer in 1985. He also had a notable spell in Mexican and US football. He played until 1999 when he retired at Aparecidense.

== Honours ==
Vasco da Gama

- Campeonato Brasileiro: 1974

Los Angeles Aztecs

- 1980–81 Western Division

Goiás

- Campeonato Goiano: 1983

Vila Nova

- Campeonato Goiano: 1984

Atlético Goianiense

- Campeonato Goiano: 1985

Dom Bosco

- Campeonato Mato-Grossense: 1991

Individual

- 1985 Campeonato Goiano top scorer: 24 goals

== Personal life ==
Oswaldo Faria is father of the footballer Alessandro Faria, also nicknamed "Bill".

== Death ==
Bill died after being run over in Aparecida de Goiânia, on 22 September 2002 at the age of 49.
