= Amaro Nadal =

Uruguayan footballer (born 1958)

Personal information
- Full name: Carlos Amaro Nadal Antunes
- Date of birth: 16 March 1958 (age 68)
- Place of birth: Montevideo, Uruguay
- Position: Forward

Senior career*
Years	Team	Apps	(Gls)
1977–1978	Nacional	3	(0)
1979	Liverpool		
1980–1982	Bella Vista		
1982–1985	Deportivo Cali	104	(45)
1985–1987	Sevilla	40	(7)
1987–1988	Logroñés	35	(8)
1988–1989	Figueres	13	(4)
1989–1990	Nacional	4	(0)

International career
1977	Uruguay under-20	11	(6)
1982–1985	Uruguay	19	(10)
- * Club domestic league appearances and goals

Carlos Amaro Nadal Antunes (born 16 March 1958, in Montevideo) is a former Uruguayan footballer who played as a forward. Nadal began his professional career for Nacional in 1977, and after stints on Liverpool and Bella Vista transferred to Deportivo Cali in 1982, from there, being signed by Sevilla in 1985. After two seasons in Sevilla, he went to Logroñés and Figueres before retiring on Nacional.

Nadal was part of the Uruguay squad that reached fourth place in the 1977 FIFA World Youth Championship, scoring twice in that tournament, was also the top scorer of the 1977 South American U-20 Championship, and later, between 1982 and 1985, he received nineteen caps for the senior Uruguay national football team, scoring ten times.
