= Agustín Manzo =

Mexican footballer (born 1958)

Personal information
- Full name: Agustín Manzo Ponce
- Date of birth: 16 October 1958 (age 68)
- Place of birth: Mexico City, Mexico
- Position: Forward

Senior career*
Years	Team	Apps	(Gls)
1976–1980	América	59	(17)
1980–1981	Puebla	14	(2)
1981–1984	Toluca	102	(45)
1984–1989	Cruz Azul	97	(40)
1989–1990	Tampico Madero	3	(0)

International career
1977	Mexico U20	3	(3)
1980–1984	Mexico	7	(4)
Medal record
Men's football
Representing Mexico
FIFA U-20 World Cup
Silver medal – second place	1977 Tunisia	Team
- * Club domestic league appearances and goals

Agustín Manzo Ponce (born 16 October 1958) is a Mexican retired footballer. Nicknamed "Yayo", he played for América, Toluca and Cruz Azul throughout the late 1970s and the 1980s. He also represented Mexico internationally for the 1977 FIFA World Youth Championship.

== Club career ==
Manzo began his footballing career with América for their 1976–77 season. Despite the Águilas being champions in the prior 1974–75 season, they had suffered a lack of titles throughout the late 1970s. This led to him switching over to Puebla for their 1980–81 season in where the Camoteros nearly made the playoffs by a margin of just 5 points. He then began playing for Toluca throughout the following three seasons. By the time of his arrival to the club however, he had difficulties moving his left knee though the club's trainer, Aredes Barbosa, helped him recover. This investment would pay off as Manzo went on to become the top scorer in each season he appeared in and by the time of his departure following their 1983–84 season, he had become the 12th highest goalscorer in the history of the Escarleta's history.

Following his successful career with Toluca, he began playing for Cruz Azul for their 1984–85 season. His streak of being a highly successful goalscorer continued into his inauguration into the Máquina to the point of being a feared player within the Liga MX across the 1980s. Despite that however, Cruz Azul wouldn't achieve any titles across the decade with their best results being runners-up in the 1986–87 and the 1988–89 Mexican Primera División, losing out to Guadalajara and América respectively. He spent his final season with Tampico Madero during their 1989–90 season before retiring shortly after.

== International career ==
Manzo was first called up to represent the Mexico U20 team for the inaugural 1977 FIFA World Youth Championship. His first match against hosts Tunisia saw the Tricolor give a 6–0 thrashing with Manzo himself scoring two goals in the match. He later scored the 2–2 equalizer during the final against the Soviet Union with Mexico narrowly losing the final after a penalty shoot-out left them short with an 8–9 loss.

His international career continued into the senior team, first appearing as a substitute player for Pedro Munguía at the 75th minute in a friendly on 20 March 1980 against South Korea that ended in a 1–0 loss. His next appearance against Honduras on 18 March 1980 saw Manzo get sent off alongside Guillermo Mendizábal at the 60th minute though the Tricolor still managed to maintain their 0–1 lead. Despite his rough first impressions, his third appearance against Honduras was a stand-out moment as he scored the 2nd and 4th goals in the match, ending in a 5–0 beating. However, following a few appearances in 1980, he wouldn't make another appearance until a friendly against El Salvador where Manzo also scored the 3rd goal in a 5–0 beating on 25 October 1983. His final appearance saw him come in as a substitute for Mario Díaz Beltrán in a 5–0 thrashing by Italy on 4 February 1984.

== Personal life ==
Agustín is twin brothers with fellow Mexican international Armando Manzo. They briefly played together during the 1979–80 Club América season before Agustín left for Puebla the following season. They had more consistent appearances internationally however, with the two often appearing together in friendlies across the 1980s. This was in sharp contrast to their rivalry in the domestic stage due to Agustín signing with Cruz Azul whilst Armando remained with América. Despite their rivalry, they maintained good relations as when during an international training session at the Estadio Sergio León Chávez, Agustín had got caught within the chain-link fences that surrounded the field with Armando being the first to respond to his brother's pain and with the assistance of others, managed to get him free.

== Later life ==
Manzo remained active within Cruz Azul's operations as a part of the sporting management until resigning in the Apertura 2015 following poor results.
