= Paulo Roberto (footballer, born May 2005) =

Brazilian footballer

Personal information
- Full name: Paulo Roberto da Silva Souza
- Date of birth: 20 May 2005 (age 21)
- Place of birth: Tianguá, Brazil
- Height: 1.85 m (6 ft 1 in)
- Position: Forward

Team information
- Current team: Coritiba
- Number: 18

Youth career
- Fortaleza
- 2021–2022: Flamengo
- 2022–2024: Fortaleza
- 2024–2025: Coritiba

Senior career*
Years	Team	Apps	(Gls)
2025–	Coritiba	6	(1)
- * Club domestic league appearances and goals as of 15:13, 24 July 2026 (UTC)

Paulo Roberto da Silva Souza (born 20 May 2005), known as Paulo Roberto, is a Brazilian professional footballer who plays as a forward for Coritiba.

== Career ==
Born in Tianguá, Ceará, Paulo Roberto began his career with Fortaleza before moving to Flamengo in 2021. Back to his previous club in the following year, he renewed his contract until 2025 on 14 December 2022.

Paulo Roberto featured in two matches in the 2023 Copa Fares Lopes, as Fortaleza used an under-20 squad, before moving to Coritiba on 6 September 2024. After playing in the 2025 Campeonato Paranaense and the 2025 Taça FPF, he was registered in the main squad for the 2026 Série A in July of that year.

Paulo Roberto made his Série A debut on 22 July 2026; after coming on as a second-half substitute for Renato Marques, he scored Coxa's only goal in a 3–1 home loss to Palmeiras.

== Career statistics ==
As of 24 July 2026

Appearances and goals by club, season and competition
Club	Season	League			State League		Cup		Continental		Other		Total	
Club	Season	Division	Apps	Goals	Apps	Goals	Apps	Goals	Apps	Goals	Apps	Goals	Apps	Goals
Fortaleza	2023	Série A	—		—		—		—		2 (Note: Appearance(s) in Copa Fares Lopes)	0	2	0
Coritiba	2025	Série B	0	0	3	0	0	0	—		3 (Note: Appearance(s) in Taça FPF)	0	6	0
Coritiba	2026	Série A	1	1	2	0	0	0	—		—		3	1
Coritiba	Total		1	1	5	0	0	0	—		3	0	9	1
Career total			1	1	5	0	0	0	0	0	5	0	11	1
