= Moharam Asheri =

Iranian footballer (born 1959)

Personal information
- Full name: Moharam Asheri
- Date of birth: April 29, 1959 (age 67)
- Place of birth: Iran
- Position: Forward

Senior career*
| Years | Team | Apps | (Gls) |
| 1976–1983 | Taj / Esteghlal | | |

International career
| 1977 | Iran U20 | 3 | (2) |
- * Club domestic league appearances and goals

Moharam Asheri (Persian: محرم عاشری; born 29 April 1959) is a retired Iranian forward who played for Iran national under-20 football team in 1977 FIFA World Youth Championship. He was formerly played for Esteghlal Tehran.

== Goal in Derby ==
In the Tehran derby on 7 May 1977 between Taj (now known as Esteghlal) and Persepolis, Moharam Asheri scored a goal on the 45th minute to give Taj the lead. In final minutes, Hassan Rowshan scored second goal on the 84th minute and Saeid Maragehchian scored third goal on the 88th minute. The game finished 3–0.
