= Beijoca =

Brazilian footballer

Personal information
- Full name: Jorge Augusto Ferreira de Aragão
- Date of birth: 23 April 1954 (age 72)
- Place of birth: Salvador, Brazil
- Position: Forward

Youth career
- Bahia

Senior career*
Years	Team	Apps	(Gls)
1969–1970	Bahia		
1971–1972	São Domingos-AL		
1973–1974	Fortaleza		
1975–1977	Bahia		
1977	Sport Recife		
1977–1978	Fluminense de Feira		
1978	Bahia		
1979	Flamengo		
1979–1980	Bahia		
1980–1982	Catuense		
1982	Fortaleza		
1983	Vitória		
1984	Sergipe		
1984	Londrina		
1984	Bahia		
1985	Leônico		
1985	Sergipe		
1985–1986	Mogi Mirim		
1986	Ypiranga-BA		
1987	Londrina		
1988	Guará		
1988	São Domingos-AL		
1988	Leônico		
1988–1989	Estrela de Março-BA		
1989	Brusque		
1989	Gama		
1989	Guará		
1990–1991	Camaçari		
- * Club domestic league appearances and goals as of 18 February 2024

Jorge Augusto Ferreira de Aragão (born 23 April 1954), better known as Beijoca, is a Brazilian former professional footballer who played as a forward.

== Career ==
Beijoca is considered one of the greatest players in the history of EC Bahia, with 106 goals scored and state champion on six occasions. At the age of 16, he debuted in the professional team and formed an attacking partnership with José Sanfilippo, and scored his first goal for Bahia in a last-minute draw against SC Corinthians in the 1970 Torneio Roberto Gomes Pedrosa.

He played for a large number of clubs, most notably Flamengo, where he played in 1979 and played 9 games, scoring 1 goal.

In 1983, he played in the state championship for EC Vitória, claiming he was fulfilling the dream of his mother, a fan of the club.

== Style of play ==
Beijoca attracted attention on the field due to his physical form, always overweight and moving little on the field. He faced a major problem with alcoholism during his career, which was why he did not sign long contracts, in addition to frequently getting involved in fights. The most notable incident was against SE Palmeiras, where he assaulted players Mococa and Baroninho. Still, he had an outstanding ability to score goals.

== Personal life ==
The origin of the nickname was due to his childhood resemblance to the Estrela's doll called "Beijoca".

== Honours ==
Bahia

- Campeonato Baiano: 1970, 1975, 1976, 1977, 1978, 1979

Fortaleza

- Campeonato Cearense: 1973, 1974

Flamengo

- Ramón de Carranza Trophy: 1979

Individual

- 1981 Campeonato Baiano top scorer: 26 goals
