= Nariman Hasanzade =

Azerbaijani poet and playwright (1931–2026)

- Nəriman Həsənzadə
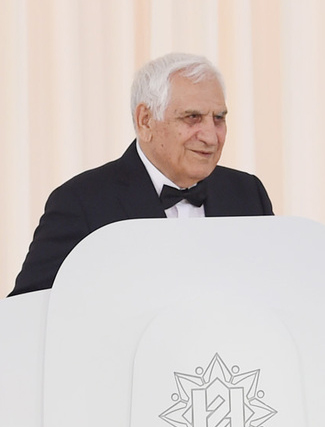
- Hasanzade in 2017
- Born: Nariman Alimammad oglu Hasanzade; 18 February 1931; Poylu, Azerbaijan SSR, Transcaucasian SFSR, Soviet Union
- Died: 1 August 2026 (aged 95); Baku, Azerbaijan
- Education: Maxim Gorky Literature Institute; Ganja State University; Baku State University
- Occupations: Poet; Playwright

Nariman Alimammad oglu Hasanzade (Azerbaijani: Nəriman Əliməmməd oğlu Həsənzadə; 18 February 1931 – 1 August 2026) was an Azerbaijani poet and playwright.

== Life and career ==
A graduate of Baku State University, he inititally pursued a career, in journalism, serving as editor-in-chief of Edebiyyat va incasanat from 1976 to 1990. From 1991 to 2001, he was First Deputy Minister of Press and Information.

Hasanzade died in Baku on 1 August 2026, at the age of 95.

== Works ==
=== Poetry ===
- Nəriman
- Zümrüd quşu
- Kimin sualı var?
- Atabəylər
- Pompeyin Qafqaza yürüşü
- Midiya sarayı
- Bəyanət
- Həsrət
- Vətənsiz
- Heybədə gəzən şeir
- Şahid ol, günəş
- Rəsul Həmzətova məktub
- Şəhid atası Şərif qağaya məktub
- Qafqaz
- Cavid
- Qaçaq Kərəm
- Səfirə
- Xarıbülbül
- Nə qəribədir
- Azadlıq himni

=== Stories ===
- Nabat xalanın çörəyi
