= Júnior Brasília =

Brazilian footballer

Personal information
- Full name: José Francisco Solano Júnior
- Date of birth: 10 April 1958 (age 68)
- Place of birth: Alvinópolis, Brazil
- Position: Midfielder

Senior career*
Years	Team	Apps	(Gls)
1975–1976	CEUB		
1976–1978	Flamengo		
1979–1980	Cruzeiro		
1980	Mixto		
1980	Grêmio Maringá		
1981	Operário-MS		
1982	Mixto		
1983–1985	Brasil de Pelotas		
1986–1987	Rio Verde-GO		

International career
1977	Brazil U20	5	(1)
- * Club domestic league appearances and goals

José Francisco Solano Júnior (born 10 April 1958), commonly known as Júnior Brasília, is a former Brazilian footballer. He was awarded the silver ball at the 1977 FIFA World Youth Championship for his performances.
