= Hugo Rodríguez (footballer, born 1959) =

Mexican footballer

Personal information
- Full name: Hugo René Rodríguez Corona
- Date of birth: 14 March 1959 (age 67)
- Place of birth: Torreón, Mexico
- Position: Forward

Senior career*
| Years | Team | Apps | (Gls) |
- Club Santos Laguna

International career
- Mexico
- * Club domestic league appearances and goals

Hugo René Rodríguez Corona (born 14 March 1959) is a Mexican former football forward who played for Mexico in the 1978 FIFA World Cup. He also played for Club Santos Laguna.
