= Reza Hassanzadeh =

Reza Hassanzadeh may refer to:

- Reza Hassanzadeh (Esteghlal, footballer) (born 1964), retired Iranian football player
- Reza Hassanzadeh (Tractor, footballer) (died 2006), Iranian football player
