= Douglas Franklin =

Brazilian footballer (1949–2026)

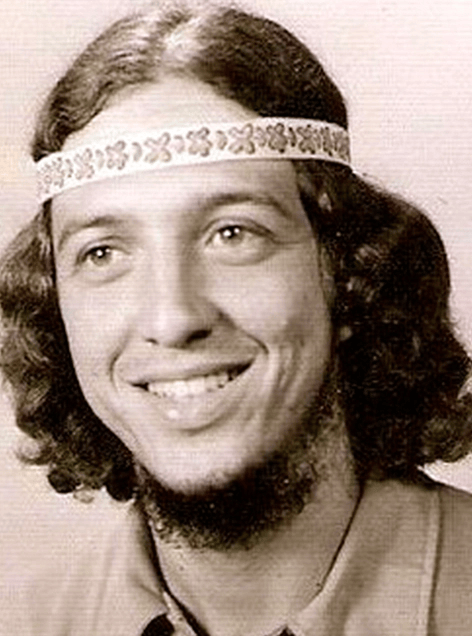

Personal information
- Full name: Douglas da Silva Franklin
- Date of birth: 9 September 1949
- Place of birth: Barretos, São Paulo, Brazil
- Date of death: 9 August 2026 (aged 76)
- Place of death: São Paulo, Brazil
- Position: Forward

Senior career*
Years	Team	Apps	(Gls)
1967–1971	Santos	223	(77)
1972–1980	Bahia	456	(184)
1980	Portuguesa	17	(2)
1981	Vitória		
1981–1985	Leônico		
1986–1988	Barretos		
1989	Dracena		

Managerial career
- 2006: Camaçari
- 2015: Barretos
- * Club domestic league appearances and goals

Douglas da Silva Franklin (9 September 1949 – 9 August 2026), better known as Douglas Franklin, was a Brazilian professional footballer and manager who played as forward.

== Career ==
Franklin began his career at Santos FC, where he even played alongside Pelé in the attack, making 223 appearances and scoring 77 goals for the club. At EC Bahia, he established himself as a standout player and a club icon, winning the state championship seven times and recording 184 goals in 456 matches, to this day, he remains the club's second-highest all-time goalscorer and the top scorer at Fonte Nova. He also played for Vitória, Portuguesa, Leônico, Barretos, and Dracena.

== Death ==
Franklin died from bowel cancer in São Paulo, on 9 August 2026, at the age of 76.

== Honours ==
Santos

- Campeonato Paulista: 1967, 1968, 1969
- Torneio Roberto Gomes Pedrosa: 1968
- Intercontinental Champions' Supercup: 1968

Bahia

- Campeonato Baiano: 1973, 1974, 1975, 1976, 1977, 1978, 1979

Individual

- Campeonato Baiano top scorer: 1973, 1978
