= Paulinho (footballer, born 1958) =

Brazilian footballer

Personal information
- Full name: Paulo Luiz Massariol
- Date of birth: April 3, 1958 (age 68)
- Place of birth: São Paulo, Brazil
- Position: Forward

Senior career*
Years	Team	Apps	(Gls)
- XV de Piracicaba
1977–1980	Vasco	69	(28)
1981	Palmeiras	6	(3)
1982	Grêmio	12	(1)
1983	Comercial-RP		
1984–1985	Leones Negros	8	(0)
- * Club domestic league appearances and goals

Paulo Luiz Massariol, commonly known as just Paulinho (born April 3, 1958), is a former Brazilian football forward, who played in several Série A clubs. He was the top goalscorer of the Série A 1978.

== Career ==
Born in São Paulo, Paulinho started his professional career with XV de Piracicaba. Paulinho played 69 Série A games for Vasco between 1977 and 1980, scoring 28 goals, and finished as the Série A 1978 with 19 goals. He then played six Série A games for Palmeiras in 1981, scoring three goals, moving to Grêmio in 1982, in which he scored a goal in 12 Série A games. Paulinho defended Comercial-RP in 1983, and retired in 1989.
