= Zenon (footballer) =

Brazilian footballer (born 1954)

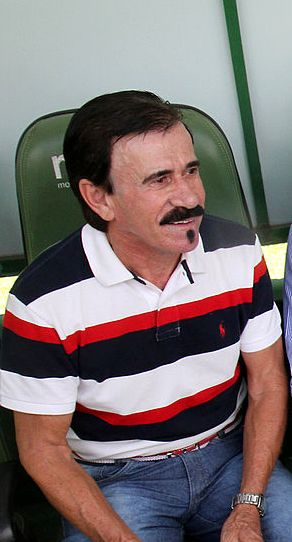

Personal information
- Full name: Zenon de Souza Farias
- Date of birth: March 31, 1954 (age 72)
- Place of birth: Tubarão, Brazil
- Height: 1.70 m (5 ft 7 in)
- Position: Central midfielder

Youth career
- Hercílio Luz
- Avaí

Senior career*
Years	Team	Apps	(Gls)
1973–1975	Avaí		
1976–1980	Guarani		
1980	Al-Ahli		
1981–1985	Corinthians		
1986–1988	Atlético Mineiro		
1988	Portuguesa		
1988–1990	Guarani		
1990	Grêmio Maringá		
1991–1992	São Bento		

International career^{‡}
1979–1984	Brazil	5	(0)
- * Club domestic league appearances and goals as of May 13, 2009 ‡ National team caps and goals as of May 13, 2009

Zenon de Souza Farias (born March 31, 1954) is a Brazilian former football (soccer) player who played for Avaí, Guarani, Corinthians, Atlético Mineiro and Portuguesa. He was born in Tubarão, Santa Catarina.

He was a skilled central midfielder with a great vision of the field, excellent long passes and was one of the best free kick takers in Brazil during the 1980s. He captained Brazil when they lost 2-0 at home to England in 1984.
