= Guina =

Brazilian footballer (born 1958)

Personal information
- Full name: Aguinaldo Roberto Gallon
- Date of birth: 4 February 1958 (age 68)
- Place of birth: Ribeirão Preto, Brazil
- Height: 1.78 m (5 ft 10 in)
- Position: Midfielder

Senior career*
Years	Team	Apps	(Gls)
1977	Comercial (SP)		
1977–1981	Vasco da Gama	81	(14)
1981–1986	Real Murcia	142	(29)
1986–1987	Belenenses	10	(1)
1987–1990	CD Tenerife	95	(16)
1990–1991	Elche CF	33	(2)
1991	São Caetano		
1992	Botafogo		
1993	Mauaense		
Total		361	(62)

International career
1977	Brazil U20		(8)
1979	Brazil	1	(0)
- * Club domestic league appearances and goals

Aguinaldo Roberto Gallon (born 4 February 1958), sometimes known as Guina or Quinha, is a Brazilian former professional footballer who played as a midfielder.

At 19 he was the top scorer of the 1977 South American Youth Championship and the 1977 FIFA World Youth Championship held in Tunisia, scoring four goals in each competition.

During his career, he played for CR Vasco da Gama, Real Murcia, C.F. Os Belenenses, C.D. Tenerife and Elche CF.

== Honours ==
Vasco de Gama

- Campeonato Carioca: 1977
- Taça Guanabara: 1977

Real Murcia

- Segunda División: 1982–83, 1985–86

Brazil

- FIFA World Youth Championship top scorer: 1977
- South American Youth Championship top scorer: 1977
