= 1977 FIFA World Youth Championship squads =

FIFA championship roster

Below are the rosters for the 1977 FIFA World Youth Championship tournament in Tunisia. Those marked in bold went on to earn full international caps.

== Group A ==
=== France ===
Head coach: (France) Jack Braun

No.	Pos.	Player	Date of birth (age)	Caps	Club
1	GK	Didier Billet	17 August 1958 (aged 18)		(France) Marseille
2	DF	**Michel Bibard**	30 November 1958 (aged 18)		(France) Nantes
3	DF	Gérard Bacconnier	17 January 1959 (aged 18)		(France) Marseille
4	DF	Bruno Creignou	19 August 1958 (aged 18)		(France) Le Havre
5	DF	Christophe Desbouillons	20 August 1958 (aged 18)		(France) Lyon
6	MF	Vincent Bracigliano	30 September 1958 (aged 18)		(France) Metz
7	FW	**Patrice Lecornu**	24 March 1958 (aged 19)		(France) Red Star Saint-Ouen
8	DF	**Philippe Jeannol**	6 August 1958 (aged 18)		(France) Nancy
9	FW	Pascal Françoise	28 February 1958 (aged 19)		(France) Lens
10	MF	**Bernard Genghini**	18 January 1958 (aged 19)		(France) Sochaux
11	FW	Thierry Meyer	22 January 1958 (aged 19)		(France) Sochaux
12	DF	Daniel Tallineau	6 May 1959 (aged 18)		(France) Bordeaux
13	MF	Philippe Piette	22 August 1958 (aged 18)		(France) Valenciennes
14	MF	Patrice Godel	25 November 1958 (aged 18)		(France) Lens
15	DF	Victorio Mastroianni	26 July 1958 (aged 18)		(France) Lens
16	FW	André Wiss	5 August 1959 (aged 17)		(France) Strasbourg
17	FW	**François Brisson**	9 April 1958 (aged 19)		(France) Paris SG
18	GK	Francis Tisiot	11 September 1958 (aged 18)		(France) Bordeaux

=== Mexico ===
Head coach: (Mexico) Alfonso Portugal

No.	Pos.	Player	Date of birth (age)	Caps	Club
1	GK	Marco Paredes	6 February 1957 (aged 20)		(Mexico) Jalisco
2	FW	Francisco Javier Mora	2 April 1958 (aged 19)		(Mexico) Cruz Azul
3	DF	Sergio Rubio	27 November 1956 (aged 20)		(Mexico) Unión de Curtidores
4	DF	Leonardo Álvarez	25 September 1955 (aged 21)		(Mexico) Monterrey
5	DF	José Flores	1 June 1958 (aged 19)		(Mexico) Leon
6	DF	Humberto Lucano	20 November 1958 (aged 18)		(Mexico) Jalisco
7	MF	Guillermo Cosio	15 September 1958 (aged 18)		(Mexico) Zacatepec
8	MF	Hugo Rodríguez	14 March 1959 (aged 18)		(Mexico) La Laguna
9	FW	Eduardo Moses	14 May 1958 (aged 19)		(Mexico) Monterrey
10	FW	Fernando Garduño	26 February 1958 (aged 19)		(Mexico) Irapuato
11	FW	Jacinto Ambriz	2 November 1958 (aged 18)		(Mexico) Atletico Español
12	GK	Eulogio Mena	27 July 1958 (aged 18)		(Mexico) Atlas
13	DF	Eduardo Rergis	20 April 1956 (aged 21)		(Mexico) América
14	MF	Carlos García	3 July 1954 (aged 22)		(Mexico) Monterrey
15	MF	**Enrique López Zarza**	25 October 1957 (aged 19)		(Mexico) Pumas UNAM
16	MF	**Jorge Dávalos**	3 July 1957 (aged 19)		(Mexico) Universidad de Guadalajara
17	FW	Agustín Manzo	15 October 1958 (aged 18)		(Mexico) America
18	MF	Luis Plascencia	4 February 1957 (aged 20)		(Mexico) Universidad de Guadalajara

=== Spain ===
Head coach: (Spain) Chus Pereda

No.	Pos.	Player	Date of birth (age)	Caps	Club
1	GK	**Francisco Buyo**	13 January 1958 (aged 19)		(Spain) Deportivo La Coruña
2	DF	**Santiago Urquiaga**	14 April 1958 (aged 19)		(Spain) Bilbao Athletic
3	DF	Salvador Campello	6 June 1958 (aged 19)		(Spain) Elche
4	DF	**Antonio García Navajas**	8 March 1958 (aged 19)		(Spain) Burgos
5	DF	Rafael García Cortés	18 January 1958 (aged 19)		(Spain) Real Madrid
6	MF	Jorge Casas	6 February 1958 (aged 19)		(Spain) Barcelona
7	FW	Emilio Gómez	14 January 1958 (aged 19)		(Spain) Barcelona
8	MF	**Ricardo Gallego**	8 February 1959 (aged 18)		(Spain) Real Madrid
9	FW	José Enrique Mayayo	9 June 1958 (aged 19)		(Spain) Bilbao Athletic
10	MF	Eduardo Lafuente	21 January 1958 (aged 19)		(Spain) Real Zaragoza
11	FW	Ángel González	3 December 1958 (aged 18)		(Spain) Espanyol
12	MF	Salvador Ribes	21 April 1958 (aged 19)		(Spain) Castellón
13	GK	José Manuel Sempere	15 February 1958 (aged 19)		(Spain) Orihuela
14	DF	Alberto Benedé	5 April 1958 (aged 19)		(Spain) Real Zaragoza
15	FW	José Antonio Alcañiz	23 October 1958 (aged 18)		(Spain) Elche
16	MF	Antonio Güembe	22 January 1959 (aged 18)		(Spain) Bilbao Athletic
17	MF	José Ricardo Escobar	13 June 1958 (aged 19)		(Spain) Cádiz
18	FW	Patricio Pelegrín	14 October 1958 (aged 18)		(Spain) Real Murcia

=== Tunisia ===
Head coach: Mokhtar Ben Nacef

No.	Pos.	Player	Date of birth (age)	Caps	Club
1	GK	Mohsen Rajhi	17 March 1958 (aged 19)		(Tunisia)
2	GK	Abdelkrim Jebali	29 January 1958 (aged 19)		(Tunisia)
3	DF	Mohamed Cheriti	23 May 1958 (aged 19)		(Tunisia)
4	DF	Samir Aloulou	24 June 1959 (aged 18)		(Tunisia)
5	DF	Fayçal Jelassi	10 October 1958 (aged 18)		(Tunisia)
6	DF	**Moncef Chargui**	7 August 1958 (aged 18)		(Tunisia)
7	MF	Mustapha Nabli	16 January 1959 (aged 18)		(Tunisia)
8	DF	Khaled Ben Yahia	12 November 1959 (aged 17)		(Tunisia)
9	FW	Abderrazak Zarrouk	18 February 1958 (aged 19)		(Tunisia)
10	FW	Khemais Ali Ben Fattoum	3 August 1958 (aged 18)		(Tunisia)
11	FW	Farid Belhoula	19 January 1958 (aged 19)		(Tunisia)
12	MF	Mohamed Ben Zitoun	20 January 1958 (aged 19)		(Tunisia)
13	MF	Mohamed Ben Dhiab	25 October 1958 (aged 18)		(Tunisia)
14	MF	Hassan Dakhli	10 February 1958 (aged 19)		(Tunisia)
15	FW	**Abdelhamid Hergal**	27 January 1959 (aged 18)		(Tunisia)
16	MF	Faouzi Marzouki	18 February 1958 (aged 19)		(Tunisia)
17	MF	Hedi Lakhal	12 June 1958 (aged 19)		(Tunisia)
18	FW	Lotfi Ben Barka	20 January 1958 (aged 19)		(Tunisia)

== Group B ==
=== Honduras ===
Head coach: (Honduras) Rodolfo Trinidad Ramirez Godoy

No.	Pos.	Player	Date of birth (age)	Caps	Club
1	GK	**Julio César Arzú**	4 May 1958 (aged 19)		(Honduras) Real España
2	DF	Pablo Palma	2 June 1958 (aged 19)		(Honduras) Club Deportivo Federal
3	DF	**Héctor Zelaya**	12 August 1958 (aged 18)		(Honduras) CD Motagua
4	MF	**Ramón Maradiaga**	30 October 1954 (aged 22)		(Honduras) CD Motagua
5	DF	**Allan Costly**	13 December 1959 (aged 17)		(Honduras) Tela Timsa
6	MF	Jose Barahona	15 November 1958 (aged 18)		(Honduras) Club Atletico Independiente
7	MF	**Prudencio Norales**	20 November 1958 (aged 18)		(Honduras) CD Olimpia
8	DF	**Gilberto Yearwood**	15 March 1959 (aged 18)		(Spain) Elche CF
9	FW	Jimmy Bailey	7 February 1958 (aged 19)		(Honduras) Real España
10	MF	Arturo Caceres	9 October 1958 (aged 18)		(Honduras) Club Deportivo La Salle
11	FW	**Porfirio Betancourt**	10 October 1957 (aged 19)		(Honduras) C.D. Marathón
12	MF	Rene Rios	3 June 1958 (aged 19)		(Honduras) Gimnastico Futbol Club
13	DF	Feliciano Merino	9 June 1958 (aged 19)		(Honduras) Club Atletico Independiente
14	MF	Luis Nuñez	19 March 1958 (aged 19)		(Honduras) Club Social y Deportivo Vida
15	MF	Jose Enrique Duarte	19 November 1959 (aged 17)		(Honduras) Club Deportivo La Salle
16	DF	Daniel Sambula	2 January 1959 (aged 18)		(Honduras) Club Deportivo Olimpia
17	MF	Orlando Rodriguez	27 November 1958 (aged 18)		(Honduras) Club Deportivo Federal
18	GK	Jose Francisco Zelaya	1 November 1958 (aged 18)		(Honduras) Club Deportivo Olimpia

=== Hungary ===
Head coach: (Hungary) Gyula Rákosi

No.	Pos.	Player	Date of birth (age)	Caps	Club
1	GK	**László Bodnár**	5 March 1959 (aged 18)		(Hungary) Pécsi MSC
2	DF	Gabor Szanto	31 January 1958 (aged 19)		(Hungary) Diósgyőri VTK
3	MF	Bela Hegedus	12 April 1958 (aged 19)		(Hungary) Vasas SC
4	DF	Árpád Toma	3 January 1958 (aged 19)		(Hungary) Pécsi MSC
5	MF	Janos Kerekes	18 September 1958 (aged 18)		(Hungary) Diósgyőri VTK
6	MF	Ferenc Fejes	4 January 1958 (aged 19)		(Hungary) Budapest Honvéd
7	MF	Rezső Kékesi	11 January 1958 (aged 19)		(Hungary) Ferencváros
8	MF	András Szebegyinszky	28 March 1958 (aged 19)		(Hungary) Vasas SC
9	MF	Imre Nagy	22 July 1958 (aged 18)		(Hungary) Pécsi MSC
10	MF	Janos Csepregi	11 March 1958 (aged 19)		(Hungary) Békéscsaba Előre
11	DF	**Zsolt Petry**	23 March 1958 (aged 19)		(Hungary) Zalaegerszegi TE
12	DF	Gabor Híres	26 February 1958 (aged 19)		(Hungary) Vasas SC
13	MF	Tibor Farkas	23 May 1958 (aged 19)		(Hungary) Kecskeméti SC
14	MF	Imre Schabel	14 July 1958 (aged 18)		(Hungary) Budapest Honvéd
15	MF	Péter Rácz	19 November 1958 (aged 18)		(Hungary) Békéscsaba Előre
16	MF	Pal Krisztin	9 January 1958 (aged 19)		(Hungary) Győri ETO
17	MF	Sandor Vincze	30 September 1958 (aged 18)		(Hungary) Ferencváros
18	GK	Istvan Varga	17 October 1958 (aged 18)		(Hungary) Vasas SC

=== Morocco ===
Head coach: Abdallah Ben Barek

No.	Pos.	Player	Date of birth (age)	Caps	Club
1	GK	Jilali Raounak	20 March 1958 (aged 19)		(Morocco) OS Safi
2	DF	Mustapha Jaoudi	22 June 1958 (aged 19)		(Morocco) FUS Rabat
3	DF	Rachid Sbaï	1 January 1958 (aged 19)		(Morocco) RS Berkane
4	DF	Belkebir Jaouad	30 March 1958 (aged 19)		(Morocco) Kenitra AC
5	DF	Abdelilah Marzak	2 May 1958 (aged 19)		(Morocco) FUS Rabat
6	FW	Mohamed Safri	18 April 1958 (aged 19)		(Morocco) Racing Casablanca
7	FW	Rachid Ksikes	5 April 1959 (aged 18)		(Morocco) Raja Beni Mellal
8	MF	Abdelhak Khelifi	1 January 1959 (aged 18)		(Morocco) Racing Casablanca
9	FW	Hafid Djourh	19 November 1958 (aged 18)		(Morocco) Raja Beni Mellal
10	MF	Said Hajar	27 July 1958 (aged 18)		(Morocco) RS Settat
11	FW	Abdelatif Miadi	1 January 1958 (aged 19)		(Morocco) USM Oudja
12	MF	Khalid Benkirane	22 January 1959 (aged 18)		(Morocco) AS Sale
13	MF	Brahim Azzaoui	20 February 1959 (aged 18)		(Morocco) OS Safi
14	FW	Mustapha Jennane	1 January 1958 (aged 19)		(Morocco) USM Oudja
15	DF	Nassim Faouzi	7 January 1958 (aged 19)		(Morocco) RS Settat
16	FW	Hamid Jnina	29 August 1958 (aged 18)		(Morocco) Kentra AC
17	MF	Driss Azzaoui	1 January 1958 (aged 19)		(Morocco) RS Berkane
18	GK	Mustapha Hinga	8 March 1958 (aged 19)		(Morocco) FUS Rabat

=== Uruguay ===
Head coach: (Uruguay) Agustín Isarch

No.	Pos.	Player	Date of birth (age)	Caps	Club
1	GK	**Fernando Álvez**	4 September 1959 (aged 17)		(Uruguay) Defensor Sporting
2	DF	José Luis Russo	14 July 1958 (aged 18)		(Uruguay) Defensor Sporting
3	MF	Daniel Enríquez	20 May 1958 (aged 19)		(Uruguay) Nacional
4	DF	**José Moreira**	30 September 1958 (aged 18)		(Uruguay) Danubio
5	MF	Victor Duque	19 February 1958 (aged 19)		(Uruguay) Danubio
6	DF	**Eliseo Rivero**	27 December 1957 (aged 19)		(Uruguay) Danubio
7	FW	Alberto Bica	11 February 1958 (aged 19)		(Uruguay) Cerro
8	MF	**Víctor Diogo**	9 April 1958 (aged 19)		(Uruguay) Peñarol
9	FW	Amaro Nadal	16 March 1958 (aged 19)		(Uruguay) Bella Vista
10	MF	Ariel Krasouski	31 May 1958 (aged 19)		(Uruguay) Wanderers
11	FW	**Venancio Ramos**	20 June 1959 (aged 18)		(Uruguay) Peñarol
12	GK	Carlos Maynard	21 May 1959 (aged 18)		(Uruguay) Nacional
13	DF	**Hugo de León**	27 February 1958 (aged 19)		(Uruguay) Nacional
14	FW	Héctor Vique	27 June 1958 (aged 19)		(Uruguay) Huracán Buceo
15	MF	**Mario Saralegui**	24 April 1959 (aged 18)		(Uruguay) Peñarol
16	FW	Américo Silva	7 December 1959 (aged 17)		(Uruguay) OFI
17	MF	Gerardo Caetano	30 April 1958 (aged 19)		(Uruguay) Defensor Sporting
18	MF	**Rubén Paz**	8 August 1959 (aged 17)		(Uruguay) Peñarol

== Group C ==
=== Brazil ===
Head coach: (Brazil) Evaristo de Macedo

No.	Pos.	Player	Date of birth (age)	Caps	Club
1	GK	João Roberto	14 July 1958 (aged 18)		(Brazil) Guarani
2	DF	**Edevaldo**	28 January 1958 (aged 19)		(Brazil) Fluminense
3	DF	**Juninho Fonseca**	29 August 1958 (aged 18)		(Brazil) Ponte Preta
4	MF	Jorge Luís	14 March 1958 (aged 19)		(Brazil) Flamengo
5	DF	Heraldo	12 July 1958 (aged 18)		(Brazil) Operário
6	DF	Valdemir	6 April 1958 (aged 19)		(Brazil) Caldense
7	MF	Tião	4 August 1959 (aged 17)		(Brazil) Cruzeiro
8	FW	Cléber	25 November 1958 (aged 18)		(Brazil) Atlético Mineiro
9	FW	Paulinho	25 April 1958 (aged 19)		(Brazil) XV de Piracicaba
10	FW	**Guina**	4 February 1958 (aged 19)		(Brazil) Comercial (SP)
11	FW	Baroninho	18 January 1958 (aged 19)		(Brazil) Noroeste
12	GK	Birigui	1 April 1958 (aged 19)		(Brazil) Guarani
13	DF	Grite	11 February 1958 (aged 19)		(Brazil) Figueirense
14	MF	Paulo Roberto	17 April 1958 (aged 19)		(Brazil) Juventus
15	FW	Zito	14 December 1958 (aged 18)		(Brazil) Botafogo
16	FW	Júnior Brasília	10 April 1958 (aged 19)		(Brazil) Flamengo
17	MF	Nardela	1 January 1958 (aged 19)		(Brazil) XV de Piracicaba
18	FW	**Baltazar**	17 July 1959 (aged 17)		(Brazil) Atlético Goianiense

=== Ivory Coast ===
Head coach: (Ivory Coast) George Beniamini

No.	Pos.	Player	Date of birth (age)	Caps	Club
1	GK	Gastien Krouba	20 February 1959 (aged 18)		(Ivory Coast) Asec Mimosas
2	DF	**Gaston Adjoukoua**	14 February 1958 (aged 19)		(Ivory Coast) AFAD Abidjan
3	DF	Léopold Bridji	16 December 1958 (aged 18)		(Ivory Coast) Asec Mimosas
4	DF	Basile Siagoué	2 January 1959 (aged 18)		(Ivory Coast) AFAD Abidjan
5	DF	Ignace Aka Kablan	15 October 1958 (aged 18)		(Ivory Coast) Asec Mimosas
6	MF	Laurent Madou	4 April 1958 (aged 19)		(Ivory Coast) USC Bassam
7	FW	Lucien Kouassi	26 December 1958 (aged 18)		(Ivory Coast) Abidjan City F.C.
8	MF	**Pascal Miézan**	3 April 1959 (aged 18)		(Ivory Coast) Africa Sports d'Abidjan
9	FW	Abdoulaye Fofana	21 March 1958 (aged 19)		(Ivory Coast) USC Bassam
10	MF	N'dri Koffi	2 January 1958 (aged 19)		(Ivory Coast) Abidjan City F.C.
11	FW	Honore Ya Semon	28 August 1958 (aged 18)		(Ivory Coast) AS Denguele
12	MF	Mamadou Sakisso	3 March 1959 (aged 18)		(Ivory Coast) AS Abobo
13	MF	Agustin Allé	28 August 1958 (aged 18)		(Ivory Coast) Football Club Hire
14	FW	Daniel Adzeu Allé	12 July 1958 (aged 18)		(Ivory Coast) AS Denguele
15	DF	Gnaly Oyourou	22 February 1959 (aged 18)		(Ivory Coast) Football Club Hire
16	FW	Jean-Noël Youayou Douagré	30 December 1958 (aged 18)		(Ivory Coast) Abidjan City F.C.
17	GK	Marcel Bodoua	5 January 1958 (aged 19)		(Ivory Coast) Africa Sports d'Abidjan
18	DF	Edouard Houhon	20 December 1958 (aged 18)		(Ivory Coast) AFAD Abidjan

=== Iran ===
Head coach: (Iran) Mahmoud Yavari

No.	Pos.	Player	Date of birth (age)	Caps	Club
1	GK	Ali Rasoulzadeh	1 February 1958 (aged 19)		(Iran) Bank Melli
2	DF	Abolghasem Kalantari	28 November 1958 (aged 18)		(Iran) Bargh Shiraz
3	DF	Habib Makvandi	22 March 1958 (aged 19)		(Iran) Zob Ahan
4	DF	**Asghar Sadri**	1 January 1958 (aged 19)		(Iran) Rah Ahan
5	MF	Reza Rajabi	25 January 1959 (aged 18)		(Iran) Bank Melli
6	MF	**Abdolali Changiz**	27 April 1957 (aged 20)		(Iran) Taj
7	MF	Ahmadali Heydari	20 October 1958 (aged 18)		(Iran) Shahbaz
8	MF	**Hamid Derakhshan**	13 January 1958 (aged 19)		(Iran) Persepolis
9	FW	Gholamhossein Hashempour	4 February 1959 (aged 18)		(Iran) Rah Ahan
10	FW	Moharram Asheri	29 April 1959 (aged 18)		(Iran) Taj
11	FW	Abbas Kargar	3 June 1958 (aged 19)		(Iran) Tractor Sazi
12	MF	Alikaram Suri	21 March 1960 (aged 17)		(Iran) Bank Melli
13	MF	Faramarz Omidvar	2 March 1958 (aged 19)		(Iran) Bargh Shiraz
14	MF	Alireza Najaflou	2 September 1958 (aged 18)		(Iran) Tractor Sazi
15	MF	**Abdolreza Barzegari**	18 August 1958 (aged 18)		(Iran) Sanat Naft
16	FW	**Gholamreza Naalchegar**	19 April 1958 (aged 19)		(Iran) Taj
17	FW	Jamshid Nassiri	15 March 1959 (aged 18)		(Iran) Rastakhiz
18	GK	Ebrahim Nikpour	17 July 1958 (aged 18)		(Iran) Daraei

=== Italy ===
Head coach: (Italy) Italo Acconcia

No.	Pos.	Player	Date of birth (age)	Caps	Club
1	GK	**Giovanni Galli**	29 April 1958 (aged 19)		(Italy) Fiorentina
2	DF	Stefano Garuti	15 July 1959 (aged 17)		(Italy) Bologna
3	DF	**Giuseppe Baresi**	7 February 1958 (aged 19)		(Italy) Internazionale
4	MF	Luigi Sacchetti	22 March 1958 (aged 19)		(Italy) Fiorentina
5	DF	Moreno Ferrario	20 March 1959 (aged 18)		(Italy) Varese
6	MF	**Antonio Di Gennaro**	5 October 1958 (aged 18)		(Italy) Fiorentina
7	MF	Ennio Mastalli	31 October 1958 (aged 18)		(Italy) Bologna
8	MF	**Antonio Sabato**	9 January 1958 (aged 19)		(Italy) Internazionale
9	FW	Luigi Capuzzo	1 April 1958 (aged 19)		(Italy) Juventus
10	MF	Gaudenzio Colla	22 January 1959 (aged 18)		(Italy) Atalanta
11	FW	Aldo Cantarutti	17 October 1958 (aged 18)		(Italy) Torino
12	GK	Rossano Pinti	19 January 1958 (aged 19)		(Italy) Perugia
13	DF	Andrea Maiani	17 October 1958 (aged 18)		(Italy) Reggiana
14	MF	Massimo Pedrazzini	3 February 1958 (aged 19)		(Italy) Varese
15	DF	Plinio Serena	8 May 1959 (aged 18)		(Italy) Juventus
16	MF	Pietro Sbaccanti	30 January 1958 (aged 19)		(Italy) Roma
17	MF	Giuseppe Greco	19 March 1958 (aged 19)		(Italy) Turris
18	FW	Luciano Gaudino	13 July 1958 (aged 18)		(Italy) A.C. Milan

== Group D ==
=== Austria ===
Head coach: (Austria) Alfred Hohenberger

No.	Pos.	Player	Date of birth (age)	Caps	Club
1	GK	Josef Heinisch	13 October 1958 (aged 18)		Austria Wien
2	MF	Karl Kolla	10 May 1959 (aged 18)		(Austria) SK Altheim
3	MF	Johann Koller	21 September 1958 (aged 18)		(Austria) Sturm Graz
4	DF	Oswald Stieger	17 March 1960 (aged 17)		(Austria) SC Eisenstadt
5	MF	Armin Kuhnert	16 February 1958 (aged 19)		(Austria) Rapid Wien
6	MF	Wolfgang Augustin	20 January 1958 (aged 19)		(Austria) Rapid Wien
7	MF	Peter Netuschill	16 September 1958 (aged 18)		(Austria) SC Neusiedl am See 1919
8	MF	Heinz Weiss	9 January 1958 (aged 19)		(Austria) Rapid Wien
9	MF	Gebhard Hammerle	28 July 1958 (aged 18)		SC Austria Lustenau
10	DF	Franz Zore	22 January 1959 (aged 18)		(Austria) SV St Veit
11	FW	Werner Gregoritsch	22 March 1958 (aged 19)		(Austria) Grazer AK
12	MF	Helmut Wartinger	13 September 1959 (aged 17)		(Austria) VOEST Linz
13	DF	Peter Müller	14 April 1960 (aged 17)		Austria Wien
14	FW	Adolf Meyer	4 March 1958 (aged 19)		(Austria) Wiener SC
15	DF	Martin Lefor	19 February 1960 (aged 17)		(Austria) SC Eisenstadt
16	GK	Erich Weidenauer	21 February 1959 (aged 18)		Austria Wien

- Only 16 players in Austria squad.

(N°17) Karl Meister MF Lask Linz Austria 24/2/1958 (N°18) Johann Gross FW Rapid Wien Austria 21/12/1959

=== Iraq ===
Head coach: (Socialist Federal Republic of Yugoslavia) Nedrag Stanković

No.	Pos.	Player	Date of birth (age)	Caps	Club
1	GK	Abdul-Salam Ali Hussein	1 January 1959 (aged 18)		(Iraq) Amanat Baghdad SC
2	DF	Abdul-Amir Ahmed Ali	1 January 1959 (aged 18)		(Iraq) Al-Tijara SC
3	DF	**Saadi Toma**	25 April 1955 (aged 22)		(Iraq) Al-Quwa Al-Jawiya
4	DF	Hassan Fadhel Hussein	1 January 1958 (aged 19)		(Iraq) Al-Sinaa SC
5	DF	Yahya Majeed Muhammad Ali	1 January 1959 (aged 18)		(Iraq) Al-Jaish SC
6	MF	**Mahdi Jassim**	4 March 1956 (aged 21)		(Iraq) Al-Zawraa
7	FW	**Hussein Luaibi**	1 July 1953 (aged 23)		(Iraq) Al-Shorta
8	MF	Najah Abduljabbar Kadhim	1 January 1958 (aged 19)		(Iraq) Al-Quwa Al-Jawiya
9	FW	Jabbar Hameed Awfi	1 January 1958 (aged 19)		(Iraq) Al-Shorta
10	FW	**Hussein Saeed**	21 January 1958 (aged 19)		(Iraq) Al-Jamea
11	FW	**Mahdi Abdul-Sahib**	28 July 1956 (aged 20)		(Iraq) Al-Jamea
12	MF	Hadi Hussein Ḥammadi	1 January 1958 (aged 19)		(Iraq) Al-Shorta
13	DF	Salih Najim Aboud	1 January 1958 (aged 19)		(Iraq) Amanat Baghdad SC
14	MF	**Wamidh Khudhor**	1 October 1958 (aged 18)		(Iraq) Al-Jamea
15	MF	Ramy Najim Abdullah	1 January 1959 (aged 18)		(Iraq) Al-Sinaa SC
16	MF	Fadhel Kadhim	1 January 1959 (aged 18)		(Iraq) Al-Sinaa SC
17	DF	**Ayad Mohammed Ali**	1 July 1956 (aged 20)		(Iraq) Al-Sinaa SC
18	GK	**Kadhim Nasser**	9 January 1960 (aged 17)		(Iraq) Al-Zawraa

=== Paraguay ===
Head coach: (Paraguay) Salvador Breglia

No.	Pos.	Player	Date of birth (age)	Caps	Club
1	GK	Enrique Bernal	15 July 1959 (aged 17)		(Paraguay) Sol de América
2	DF	Alfredo González Ledesma	19 August 1959 (aged 17)		(Paraguay) Cerro Porteño
3	DF	Alejandro Bóveda	9 February 1958 (aged 19)		(Paraguay) Nacional
4	DF	Marcial Espínola	12 January 1959 (aged 18)		(Paraguay) Sol de América
5	DF	Óscar Nicolas López	9 May 1958 (aged 19)		(Paraguay) Sportivo Luqueño
6	MF	Juan de la Cruz Sanabria	3 May 1958 (aged 19)		(Paraguay) Cerro Porteño
7	MF	Juan Manuel Battaglia	11 June 1957 (aged 20)		(Paraguay) Nacional
8	MF	Pedro Antonio López Galeano	29 June 1958 (aged 18)		(Paraguay) Guaraní
9	MF	Víctor Morel	9 September 1958 (aged 18)		(Paraguay) Libertad
10	FW	Gustavo Fanego	30 September 1958 (aged 18)		(Paraguay) Guaraní
11	FW	Darío Ferreira	25 June 1959 (aged 18)		(Paraguay) Club Capitán Figari
12	GK	Cipriano Leguizamón	26 September 1958 (aged 18)		(Paraguay) Guaraní
13	DF	Bernardo Benítez	12 March 1958 (aged 19)		(Paraguay) Libertad
14	DF	Virgilio Cantero	21 November 1958 (aged 18)		(Paraguay) Sol de América
15	MF	Valentín Rojas	16 December 1958 (aged 18)		(Paraguay) Rubio Ñu
16	FW	Domingo Salmaniego	20 December 1958 (aged 18)		(Paraguay) Club Olimpia
17	MF	Eugenio Giménez	4 May 1959 (aged 18)		(Paraguay) Cerro Porteño
18	MF	Jorge Galarza	8 October 1959 (aged 17)		(Paraguay) Cerro Porteño

=== Soviet Union ===
Head coach: (Soviet Union) Sergei Mosyagin

No.	Pos.	Player	Date of birth (age)	Caps	Club
1	GK	Aleksandr Novikov	27 February 1958 (aged 19)		(Soviet Union) CSKA Moscow
2	DF	Valentyn Kryachko	27 January 1958 (aged 19)		(Soviet Union) Metallist Kharkov
3	DF	**Sergei Baltacha**	17 February 1958 (aged 19)		(Soviet Union) Dinamo Kiev
4	DF	**Viktor Kaplun**	5 May 1958 (aged 19)		(Soviet Union) Metallist Kharkov
5	DF	Aleksei Ilyin	1 May 1958 (aged 19)		(Soviet Union) Lokomotiv Moscow
6	MF	**Andriy Bal**	16 February 1958 (aged 19)		(Soviet Union) Karpaty Lvov
7	MF	**Volodymyr Bezsonov**	5 March 1958 (aged 19)		(Soviet Union) Dinamo Kiev
8	MF	**Vagiz Khidiyatullin**	3 March 1959 (aged 18)		(Soviet Union) Spartak Moscow
9	MF	Igor Bychkov	19 April 1958 (aged 19)		(Soviet Union) CSKA Moscow
10	FW	Robert Khalaidjian	25 June 1958 (aged 19)		(Soviet Union) Ararat Yerevan
11	FW	**Valeriy Petrakov**	6 May 1958 (aged 19)		(Soviet Union) Lokomotiv Moscow
12	FW	Hryhoriy Batych	8 February 1958 (aged 19)		(Soviet Union) Karpaty Lvov
13	DF	Oleksandr Sopko	11 May 1958 (aged 19)		(Soviet Union) Dinamo Kiev
14	MF	Sergey Kiselnikov	19 May 1958 (aged 19)		(Soviet Union) Dynamo Moscow
15	DF	Vladimir Bodrov	8 July 1958 (aged 18)		(Soviet Union) Dynamo Moscow
16	DF	Sergei Igumin	9 May 1958 (aged 19)		(Soviet Union) CSKA Moscow
17	DF	Serhiy Zharkov	7 May 1958 (aged 19)		(Soviet Union) Chernomorets Odessa
18	GK	Yuriy Syvukha	13 January 1958 (aged 19)		(Soviet Union) Dinamo Kiev
