= Ukraine national under-20 football team =

Ukraine Under-20
- Association: Ukrainian Association of Football
- Confederation: UEFA (Europe)
- Head coach: Dmytro Mykhaylenko
- Captain: Maksym Melnychenko
- FIFA code: UKR
First colours	Second colours

First international
- Chile 2–4 Ukraine (Mendoza, Argentina, 17 June 2001)

Biggest win
- Myanmar 0–6 Ukraine (Whangārei, New Zealand, 2 June 2015)

Biggest defeat
- Ukraine 1–2 Paraguay (Mendoza, Argentina; 28 June 2001); China 3–2 Ukraine (Utrecht, Netherlands; 14 June 2005); Nigeria 1–0 Ukraine (Doetinchem, Netherlands; 22 June 2005)

FIFA U-20 World Cup
- Appearances: 6 (first in 2001)
- Best result: Champions (2019)

The Ukraine national under-20 football team is primarily a special team that is formed for the FIFA U-20 World Cup after a successful performance of the Ukraine national under-19 football team. The team is also used as an immediate reserve of the Ukraine national under-21 football team.

In the 1977 Soviet team that won the inaugural edition of the FIFA Youth World Championship, 9 of the 18 players of the Soviet squad were Ukrainian. As an independent country, in the 2019 FIFA U-20 World Cup Ukraine won their first title in the nation's history after defeating South Korea 3−1 in the final. They remained champions for almost 4 years, being that the 2021 edition was cancelled due to COVID-19 until they failed to qualify for the 2023 edition in which Uruguay won and became champions.

It is formed by its head coach who is appointed and directed by the Ukrainian Association of Football, the governing body for football in Ukraine.

== FIFA U-20 World Cup ==
Year	Round	Position	GP	W	D*	L	GS	GA	Squad
(Tunisia) 1977	Part of Soviet Union								
(Japan) 1979	Part of Soviet Union								
(Australia) 1981	Part of Soviet Union								
(Mexico) 1983	Part of Soviet Union								
(Soviet Union) 1985	Part of Soviet Union								
(Chile) 1987	Part of Soviet Union								
(Saudi Arabia) 1989	Part of Soviet Union								
(Portugal) 1991	Part of Soviet Union								
(Australia) 1993	Did not enter								
(Qatar) 1995	Did not qualify								
(Malaysia) 1997	Did not qualify								
(Nigeria) 1999	Did not qualify								
(Argentina) 2001	Round of 16	11th	4	1	2	1	6	5	Squad
(United Arab Emirates) 2003	Did not qualify								
(Netherlands) 2005	Round of 16	12th	4	1	1	2	7	7	Squad
(Canada) 2007	Did not qualify								
(Egypt) 2009	Did not qualify								
(Colombia) 2011	Did not qualify								
(Turkey) 2013	Did not qualify								
(New Zealand) 2015	Round of 16	9th	4	2	2	0	10	1	Squad
(South Korea) 2017	Did not qualify								
(Poland) 2019	Champions	1st	7	6	1	0	13	4	Squad
(Argentina) 2023	Did not qualify								
(Chile) 2025	Round of 16	10th	4	2	1	1	5	4	Squad
(Azerbaijan) (Uzbekistan) 2027	TBD		0	0	0	0	0	0	Squad
(Armenia) (Georgia (country)) 2029	To be determined								
Total	1 Title		23	12	7	4	41	21	5/15

- 2001: Round of 16 (led by Anatoli Kroschenko)
  - Ukraine's top scorer at the tournament: Oleksiy Byelik 3 goals
- 2005: Round of 16 (led by Oleksiy Mykhaylychenko)
  - Ukraine's top scorer at the tournament: Oleksandr Aliyev 5 goals
- 2015: Round of 16 (led by Oleksandr Petrakov)
  - Ukraine's top scorer at the tournament: Viktor Kovalenko 5 goals
- 2019: Champions (led by Oleksandr Petrakov)
  - Ukraine's top scorer at the tournament: Danylo Sikan 4 goals
- 2025: Round of 16 (led by Dmytro Mykhailenko)
  - Ukraine's top scorer at the tournament: Hennadiy Synchuk 2 goals

== Current squad ==
Players born in 2005 or later are eligible for the current representation.

The following players were called up for the 2025 FIFA U-20 World Cup in September-October 2025.

Caps and goals correct as of 7 October 2025, after the match against Spain.

No.	Pos.	Player	Date of birth (age)	Caps	Goals	Club
12	GK	Vladyslav Krapyvtsov	25 June 2005 (age 21)	5	0	(Royal Spanish Football Federation) Girona
1	GK	Svyatoslav Vanivskyi	27 February 2005 (age 21)	1	0	(Polish Football Association) Stal Rzeszów
16	GK	Markiyan Bakus	20 January 2006 (age 20)	1	0	(Ukrainian Association of Football) LNZ Cherkasy
6	DF	Maksym Melnychenko (captain)	12 February 2005 (age 21)	8	0	(Ukrainian Association of Football) Polissya Zhytomyr
20	DF	Oleksiy Husiev	16 March 2005 (age 21)	8	0	(Ukrainian Association of Football) Kudrivka
3	DF	Kyrylo Dihtyar	25 November 2007 (age 18)	7	1	(Ukrainian Association of Football) Metalist Kharkiv
4	DF	Mykola Kyrychok	16 May 2006 (age 20)	6	0	(Ukrainian Association of Football) Karpaty Lviv
17	DF	Maksym Derkach	22 February 2005 (age 21)	5	1	(Latvian Football Federation) Tukums 2000
13	DF	Daniel Vernattus	9 February 2006 (age 20)	5	0	(Ukrainian Association of Football) Metalist Kharkiv
5	DF	Vladyslav Kysil	14 June 2005 (age 21)	4	0	(Royal Spanish Football Federation) Ponferradina
7	MF	Artur Shakh	11 May 2005 (age 21)	8	0	(Ukrainian Association of Football) Karpaty Lviv
8	MF	Daniil Vashchenko	2 October 2005 (age 21)	8	0	(Ukrainian Association of Football) Oleksandriya
15	MF	Yaroslav Karaman	8 June 2006 (age 20)	8	0	(Ukrainian Association of Football) Polissya Zhytomyr
11	MF	Danylo Krevsun	21 April 2005 (age 21)	6	1	(German Football Association) Borussia Dortmund
18	MF	Bohdan Budko	7 January 2006 (age 20)	6	0	(Royal Dutch Football Association) AZ Alkmaar
2	MF	Vitaliy Katrych	17 February 2005 (age 21)	5	0	(Ukrainian Association of Football) Inhulets Petrove
14	MF	Kristian Shevchenko	10 November 2006 (age 20)	4	0	(The Football Association) Watford
21	MF	Matviy Panchenko	4 February 2006 (age 20)	3	0	(Ukrainian Association of Football) Metalist 1925 Kharkiv
10	MF	Hennadiy Synchuk	10 July 2006 (age 20)	2	2	(Canadian Soccer Association) Montréal
9	FW	Matviy Ponomarenko	11 January 2006 (age 20)	7	1	(Ukrainian Association of Football) Dynamo Kyiv
19	FW	Oleksandr Pyshchur	24 January 2005 (age 21)	5	1	(Hungarian Football Federation) Győri ETO

=== Recent call-ups ===
The following players have been called up for the team within the last 12 months.

Pos.	Player	Date of birth (age)	Caps	Goals	Club	Latest call-up
GK	Illya Popovych	30 November 2005 (age 20)	1	0	(Hungary) Kisvárda	v. United States, 10 June 2025
GK	Illya Voloshyn	15 January 2007 (age 19)	1	0	(Spain) Real Madrid	v. United States, 10 June 2025
GK	Denys Marchenko	5 February 2007 (age 19)	1	0	(Ukraine) Obolon Kyiv	v. United States, 10 June 2025
GK	Maksym Voronov	9 June 2006 (age 20)	1	0	(Brazil) Athletico Paranaense	v. Norway, 25 March 2025
DF	Mykola Oharkov	18 February 2005 (age 21)	3	0	(Ukraine) Shakhtar Donetsk	v. United States, 10 June 2025
DF	Vladyslav Zakharchenko	16 June 2006 (age 20)	3	0	(Ukraine) Dynamo Kyiv	v. United States, 10 June 2025
DF	Oleksandr Zhovtenko	17 February 2005 (age 21)	1	0	(Ukraine) Inhulets Petrove	v. United States, 10 June 2025
DF	Anton Drozd	6 August 2005 (age 21)	2	0	(Ukraine) Shakhtar Donetsk	v. Morocco, 6 June 2025 ^{RES}
DF	Ivan Yermachkov	8 June 2005 (age 21)	2	0	(Germany) Werder Bremen II	v. Norway, 25 March 2025
MF	Ramik Hadzhyiev	14 August 2005 (age 21)	3	1	(Ukraine) Metalist 1925 Kharkiv	v. United States, 10 June 2025
MF	Ivan Chaban	24 July 2006 (age 20)	3	1	(Ukraine) Karpaty Lviv	v. United States, 10 June 2025
MF	Roman Salenko	18 May 2005 (age 21)	3	0	(Ukraine) Dynamo Kyiv	v. United States, 10 June 2025
MF	Viktor Tsukanov	4 February 2006 (age 20)	1	0	(Ukraine) Shakhtar Donetsk	v. United States, 10 June 2025
MF	Dmytro Kremchanin	22 March 2005 (age 21)	0	0	(Ukraine) Dynamo Kyiv	v. United States, 10 June 2025
MF	Maksym Len	25 November 2006 (age 19)	0	0	(Germany) Fortuna Düsseldorf	v. United States, 10 June 2025
MF	Andriy Matkevych	11 January 2005 (age 21)	2	0	(Ukraine) Zorya Luhansk	v. Morocco, 6 June 2025 ^{RES}
MF	Dmytro Hodya	10 March 2005 (age 21)	2	1	(Ukraine) Veres Rivne	v. Norway, 25 March 2025
MF	Timur Tutierov	11 June 2005 (age 21)	0	0	(England) Sunderland	v. Northern Ireland, 20 March 2025 ^{WD}
FW	Artem Husol	5 January 2006 (age 20)	1	0	(Ukraine) Kolos Kovalivka	v. United States, 10 June 2025
FW	Vladyslav Herych	7 November 2005 (age 21)	0	0	(Ukraine) Dynamo Kyiv	v. United States, 10 June 2025 ^{INJ}
FW	Artem Stepanov	10 August 2007 (age 19)	0	0	(Germany) Bayer 04 Leverkusen	v. Morocco, 6 June 2025 ^{RES}
FW	Fedir Zadorozhnyi	16 November 2006 (age 20)	2	0	(Ukraine) Dynamo Kyiv	v. Norway, 25 March 2025
Notes: ^{WD} = Player withdrew from the squad due to non-injury issue.

== 2019 FIFA U-20 World Cup (Ukraine's best results) ==
=== Group stage ===
Pos	Team	Pld	W	D	L	GF	GA	GD	Pts	
1	Ukraine	3	2	1	0	4	2	+2	7	Knockout stage
2	United States	3	2	0	1	4	2	+2	6	Knockout stage
3	Nigeria	3	1	1	1	5	3	+2	4	Knockout stage
4	Qatar	3	0	0	3	0	6	−6	0	

Source: FIFA
Rules for classification: Group stage tiebreakers
24 May 2019
20:30

Ukraine	2–1	United States
Buletsa 26'; Popov 51'	Report	Servania 32'

Bielsko-Biała Stadium, Bielsko-Biała
Attendance: 4,310
Referee: Maguette N'Diaye (Senegal)
27 May 2019
18:00

Qatar	0–1	Ukraine
	Report	Popov 59'

Tychy Stadium, Tychy
Attendance: 3,513
Referee: Saíd Martínez (Honduras)
30 May 2019
20:30

Nigeria	1–1	Ukraine
Tijani 51' (pen.)	Report	Sikan 30'

Bielsko-Biała Stadium, Bielsko-Biała
Attendance: 3,143
Referee: Fernando Rapallini (Argentina)

=== Round of 16 ===
3 June 2019
17:30

Ukraine	4–1	Panama
Sikan 23', 45+1'; Popov 41'; Buletsa 83'	Report	Walker 50'

Tychy Stadium, Tychy
Attendance: 7,219
Referee: Leodán González (Uruguay)

=== Quarter-finals ===
7 June 2019
15:30

Colombia	0–1	Ukraine
	Report	Sikan 11'

Łódź Stadium, Łódź
Attendance: 8,443
Referee: Mustapha Ghorbal (Algeria)

=== Semi-finals ===
11 June 2019
17:30

Ukraine	1–0	Italy
Buletsa 65'	Report

Gdynia Stadium, Gdynia
Attendance: 7,776
Referee: Raphael Claus (Brazil)

=== Final ===
15 June 2019
18:00

Ukraine	3–1	South Korea
Supriaha 34', 54'; Tsitaishvili 89'	Report	Lee Kang-in 5' (pen.)

Łódź Stadium, Łódź
Attendance: 16,344
Referee: Ismail Elfath (United States)

== 2019 squad ==
The following 21 players have been called up to the 2019 FIFA U-20 World Cup. On 15 July 2019 all players of the squad were awarded by the presidential decree the Order of Merit, 3rd degree, while Petrakov's coaching staff were honored with title "Honored state functionary of physical culture and sport of Ukraine".

Head coach: Oleksandr Petrakov

- Coach: Andriy Annenkov
- Coach: Vyacheslav Kernozenko
- Coach: Vyacheslav Ruzhentsev

No.	Pos.	Player	Date of birth (age)	Club
1	GK	Andriy Lunin	11 February 1999 (aged 20)	(Royal Spanish Football Federation) Real Madrid
12	GK	Vladyslav Kucheruk	14 February 1999 (aged 20)	(Ukrainian Association of Football) Dynamo Kyiv
20	GK	Dmytro Riznyk	30 January 1999 (aged 20)	(Ukrainian Association of Football) Vorskla Poltava
2	DF	Valeriy Bondar	27 February 1999 (aged 20)	(Ukrainian Association of Football) Shakhtar Donetsk
3	DF	Oleksandr Safronov	11 June 1999 (aged 19)	(Ukrainian Association of Football) Desna Chernihiv
4	DF	Denys Popov	17 February 1999 (aged 20)	(Ukrainian Association of Football) Dynamo Kyiv
5	DF	Oleh Veremiyenko	13 February 1999 (aged 20)	(Ukrainian Association of Football) Kalush
9	DF	Viktor Korniyenko	14 February 1999 (aged 20)	(Ukrainian Association of Football) Shakhtar Donetsk
13	DF	Danylo Beskorovainyi	7 February 1999 (aged 20)	(Slovak Football Association) Zemplín Michalovce
17	DF	Yukhym Konoplia	26 August 1999 (aged 19)	(Ukrainian Association of Football) Shakhtar Donetsk
19	DF	Ihor Snurnitsyn	7 March 2000 (aged 19)	(Ukrainian Association of Football) Olimpik Donetsk
6	MF	Maksym Chekh	3 January 1999 (aged 20)	(Ukrainian Association of Football) Shakhtar Donetsk
7	MF	Heorhiy Tsitaishvili	18 November 2000 (aged 18)	(Ukrainian Association of Football) Dynamo Kyiv
8	MF	Oleksiy Khakhlyov	6 February 1999 (aged 20)	(Royal Spanish Football Federation) Alavés
10	MF	Serhiy Buletsa	16 February 1999 (aged 20)	(Ukrainian Association of Football) Dynamo Kyiv
15	MF	Kyrylo Dryshlyuk	16 September 1999 (aged 19)	(Ukrainian Association of Football) Oleksandriya
16	MF	Mykola Musolitin	21 January 1999 (aged 20)	(Ukrainian Association of Football) Chornomorets Odesa
21	MF	Oleksiy Kashchuk	29 June 2000 (aged 18)	(Ukrainian Association of Football) Shakhtar Donetsk
11	FW	Vladyslav Supriaha	15 February 2000 (aged 19)	(Ukrainian Association of Football) Dynamo Kyiv
14	FW	Danylo Sikan	16 April 2001 (aged 18)	(Ukrainian Association of Football) Mariupol
18	FW	Denys Ustymenko	12 April 1999 (aged 20)	(Ukrainian Association of Football) Oleksandriya

== Head-to-head record ==
The following table shows Ukraine's head-to-head record in the FIFA U-20 World Cup.

Opponent	Pld	W	D	L	GF	GA	GD	Win %
China	2	0	1	1	2	3	−1	0.00
Chile	1	1	0	0	4	2	+2	100.00
Colombia	1	1	0	0	1	0	+1	100.00
Italy	1	1	0	0	1	0	+1	100.00
Myanmar	1	1	0	0	6	0	+6	100.00
Nigeria	2	0	1	1	1	2	−1	0.00
Panama	3	2	1	0	8	3	+5	66.67
Paraguay	2	1	0	1	3	3	+0	50.00
Qatar	1	1	0	0	1	0	+1	100.00
New Zealand	1	0	1	0	0	0	+0	0.00
Senegal	1	0	1	0	1	1	+0	0.00
South Korea	2	2	0	0	5	2	+3	100.00
Spain	1	0	0	1	0	1	−1	0.00
Turkey	1	0	1	0	2	2	+0	0.00
United States	3	2	1	0	6	2	+4	66.67
Total	23	12	7	4	41	21	+20	52.17

== Honours ==
- FIFA U-20 World Cup:
  - Champions (1): 2019
- Maurice Revello Tournament:
  - Champions (1): 2024

== Ukrainian footballers in the Soviet Union squads ==
- 1977 winners (9/18): Valentyn Kryachko, Sergei Baltacha, Viktor Kaplun, Andriy Bal, Volodymyr Bezsonov, Hryhoriy Batych, Oleksandr Sopko, Serhiy Zharkov, Yuriy Syvukha
- 1979 runners-up (9/18): Viktor Chanov, ~~(Aleksandr Polukarov)~~, Yaroslav Dumansky, Mykhaylo Olefirenko, Valeriy Zubenko, Oleh Taran, Sergey Ovchinnikov, Anatoliy Radenko, Oleksandr Zavarov, Serhiy Krakovskyi (head coach Sergei Korshunov represented Ukraine in 1956)
- 1983 (6/18): Valeriy Palamarchuk, Vadym Karatayev, Pavlo Yakovenko, Hennadiy Lytovchenko, Ihor Petrov, Oleh Protasov
- 1985 (6/18): Ihor Kutyepov, Volodymyr Horilyi, Serhiy Khudozhilov, Vyacheslav Medvid, ~~(Sergei Savchenko)~~, Oleh Serdyuk, Oleksandr Yesipov
- 1989 (8/18): Oleh Benko, Serhiy Zayets, Serhiy Bezhenar, Oleg Salenko, Oleh Matvyeyev, Yuri Nikiforov, Yuri Moroz, Viktor Onopko
- 1991 third (7/18): Oleksandr Pomazun, Sergei Mamchur, Dmytro Mykhaylenko, Serhiy Scherbakov, Serhiy Konovalov, Volodymyr Sharan, Yevhen Pokhlebayev
