= Alexander Novikov (disambiguation) =

Alexander Novikov (1900–1976) was a Soviet Air Force marshal.

Alexander or Aleksandr Novikov may also refer to:

- Alexander Novikov (mathematician), professor of mathematics
- Aleksandr Novikov (singer) (born 1953), Soviet and Russian author and performer of songs
- Aleksandr Novikov (footballer, born 1955), Soviet and Russian football manager and former defender
- Aleksandr Novikov (footballer, born 1958) (1958–1991), Soviet Russian football goalkeeper
- Aleksandr Novikov (footballer, born 1984), Russian football centre-back
- Aleksandr Novikov (rower) (born 1985), Belarusian Olympic rower
