= Maksym Voronov =

Ukrainian footballer (born 2006)

Personal information
- Full name: Maksym Serhiyovych Voronov
- Date of birth: 9 April 2006 (age 20)
- Place of birth: Luhansk, Ukraine
- Height: 1.92 m (6 ft 4 in)
- Position: Goalkeeper

Team information
- Current team: Athletico Paranaense
- Number: 76

Youth career
- –2017: Vostok Kharkiv
- 2019: DYuSSh-2 Sievierodonetsk
- 2019–2021: Mayak Valky
- 2021–2023: Metalist Kharkiv
- 2023–: Athletico Paranaense

Senior career*
Years	Team	Apps	(Gls)
2025–	Athletico Paranaense	0	(0)

International career^{‡}
2025	Ukraine U20	1	(0)
- * Club domestic league appearances and goals ‡ National team caps and goals as of 22 March 2025

Maksym Serhiyovych Voronov (Ukrainian: Максим Сергійович Воронов; born 9 June 2006) is a Ukrainian professional footballer who plays as a goalkeeper for Club Athletico Paranaense.

== Club career ==
As a youth player, Voronov joined the youth academy of Ukrainian side Vostok Kharkiv. Two years later, he joined the youth academy of Ukrainian side DYuSSh-2 Sievierodonetsk. The same year, he joined the youth academy of Ukrainian side Mayak Valky.

In 2021, he joined the youth academy of Ukrainian side Metalist Kharkiv. Subsequently, he joined the youth academy of Brazilian side Athletico Paranaense in 2023, helping the under-20 team reach the semi-finals of the 2024 Campeonato Brasileiro Sub-20 and was promoted to the club's senior team in 2025.

== International career ==
Voronov is a Ukraine youth international. On 22 March 2025, he debuted for the Ukraine national under-20 football team during a 1–0 friendly away win over the Northern Ireland national under-21 football team.

== Style of play ==
Voronov plays as a goalkeeper and is right-footed. Initially, he played as a defender. Ukrainian news website Futbol 24 wrote in 2025 that "one of the Ukrainian's greatest strengths is his large anthropometry, in particular his arm span".
