= Oleksandr Petrakov =

Ukrainian footballer and manager (born 1957)

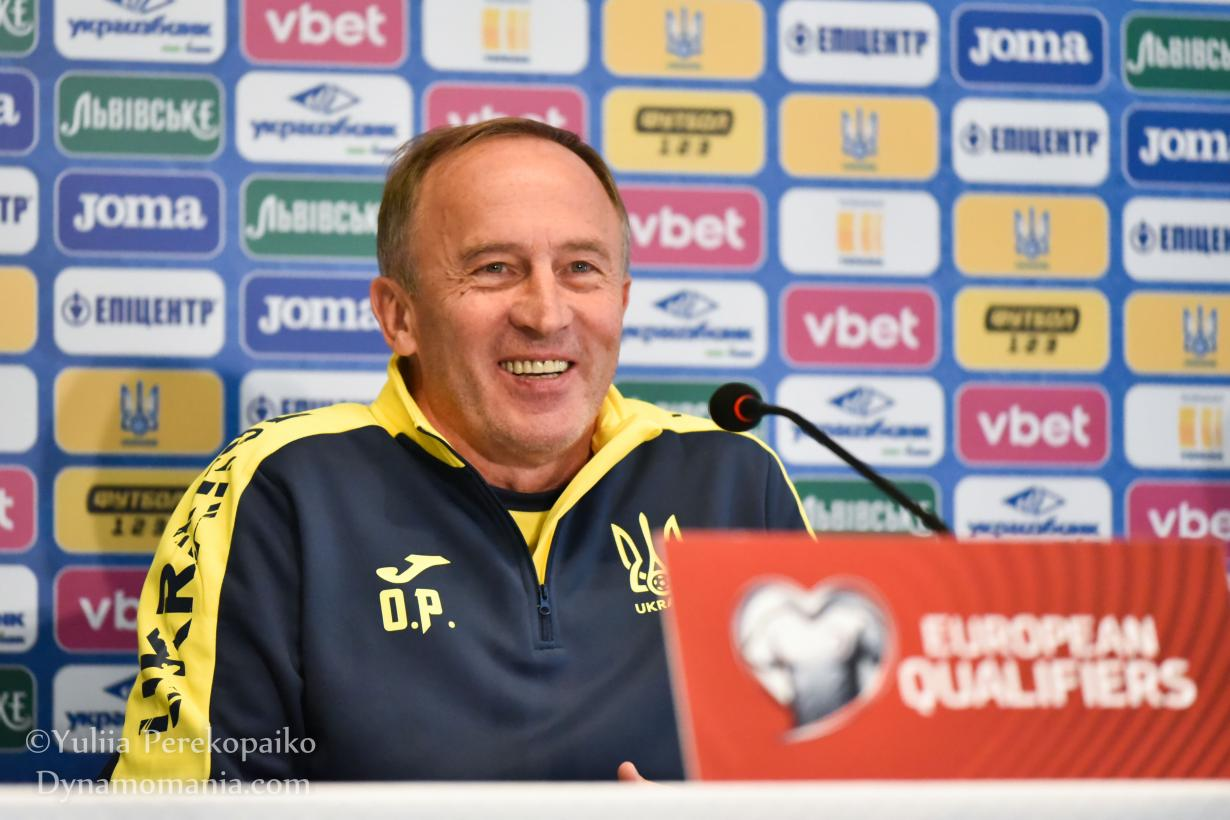
- Petrakov in 2021

Personal information
- Full name: Oleksandr Vasylyovych Petrakov
- Date of birth: 6 August 1957 (age 69)
- Place of birth: Kyiv, Ukrainian SSR, Soviet Union
- Position: Defender

Team information
- Current team: Kryvbas Kryvyi Rih (head coach)

Youth career
- Dynamo Kyiv

Senior career*
Years	Team	Apps	(Gls)
1976–1978	Lokomotyv Vinnytsia	69	(2)
1978	Bilshovyk Kyiv		
1978–1979	SKA Kyiv	13	(0)
1979–1980	Dnipro Cherkasy	41	(0)
1981–1982	Avanhard Rivne	90	(2)
1983–1984	Kolos Nikopol	46	(0)
1986–1990	SKA YGV Budapest		
1991	Budivelnyk Ivankiv		(1)

Managerial career
- 1991–1992: Budivelnyk Ivankiv
- 1993–1994: Torpedo Zaporizhzhia (assistant)
- 1996–1998: CSKA-2 Kyiv (assistant)
- 1998–1999: CSKA-2 Kyiv
- 2000: Spartak Sumy
- 2001: Vinnytsia
- 2001: Vinnytsia (assistant)
- 2002–2005: Dynamo Kyiv (academy)
- 2006–2010: RVUFK Kyiv
- 2011: Ukraine U16
- 2012: Ukraine U17
- 2013: Ukraine U18
- 2014: Ukraine U19
- 2015: Ukraine U20 / Ukraine U16
- 2016: Ukraine U17
- 2017: Ukraine U18
- 2018: Ukraine U19
- 2019: Ukraine U20 / Ukraine U16
- 2020: Ukraine U17
- 2021: Ukraine U18
- 2021–2023: Ukraine
- 2023–2024: Armenia
- 2026–: Kryvbas Kryvyi Rih
Medal record
Men's football
Representing Ukraine (as manager)
FIFA U-20 World Cup
Winner	2019	U-20 team
- * Club domestic league appearances and goals

Oleksandr Vasylyovych Petrakov (Ukrainian: Олекса́ндр Васи́льович Петрако́в; born 6 August 1957) is a Ukrainian professional football manager and former player who played as a defender. He was the coach of the Armenia national team.

== Playing career ==
Born in Kyiv, Petrakov is a product of the local Dynamo Kyiv youth sportive school system. He played for the Soviet third tier sides of Ukrainian group such as Lokomotyv Vinnytsia (1976–1978), SKA Kyiv (1978–1979), Dnipro Cherkasy (1979–1980), Avanhard Rivne (1981–1982), Kolos Nikopol (1983–1984). In 1986 Petrakov went abroad to play for the Soviet Southern Group of Forces team in Budapest, Hungary (1986–1990). In 1978 and 1991 he played for couple of amateur clubs like Bilshovyk Kyiv and Budivelnyk Ivankiv (near Chernobyl).

== Coaching career ==
In his coaching career were included: amateur side Budivelnyk Ivankiv (1991–1993, head coach), top tier Torpedo Zaporizhzhia (1993–1994, assistant coach), several second tier clubs like CSKA-2 Kyiv (1996–1998, assistant coach; 1998–1999, head coach), Spartak Sumy (2000–2001, head coach), FC Vinnytsia (2001, head coach), Dynamo Kyiv academy (2001–2005), amateur RVUFC Kyiv (2006–2010), different youth national teams of Ukraine (2010–2021), winning the 2019 FIFA U-20 World Cup when his side defeated South Korea 3–1 in the final. He was leading national team sides of 1996 years of birth, 1999 and 2003.

Petrakov from March 2014 possesses UEFA Pro Licence.

On 17 August 2021, Petrakov was appointed as an acting coach of Ukraine for the 2022 FIFA World Cup qualifying cycle. On 12 January 2023, Petrakov left his post as manager of Ukraine.

On 14 January 2023, he became the manager of the Armenia national team. On 13 October 2024, Petrakov left his post.

== Personal life ==
Petrakov is married to Iryna. The couple have a daughter, Viktoria, and a son, Yevhen.

During the 2022 Russian invasion of Ukraine, Petrakov and his wife refused to flee besieged Kyiv. Petrakov tried to sign up to Ukraine’s territorial defence forces, but his lack of military experience prevented this. According to Petrakov: “I am 64 but I felt it was normal to do this. I think I could take two or three enemies out.”

== Coaching statistics ==
As of 13 October 2024

Managerial record by team and tenure
Team	From	To	Record				
Team	From	To	P	W	D	L	Win %
Ukraine	18 August 2021	12 January 2023	15	6	7	2	40.0
Armenia	14 January 2023	13 October 2024	18	4	4	10	22.2

== Honours ==
=== Manager ===
Ukraine U20

- FIFA U-20 World Cup: 2019
