= 2019 FIFA U-20 World Cup final =

- Event: 2019 FIFA U-20 World Cup
Ukraine	South Korea
(Ukraine)	(South Korea)
3	1
- Date: 15 June 2019
- Venue: Łódź Stadium, Łódź
- Referee: Ismail Elfath (United States)
- Attendance: 16,344
- Weather: Partly Cloudy; 32 °C (90 °F); 37% humidity

The 2019 FIFA U-20 World Cup final was the final match of the 2019 FIFA U-20 World Cup in Poland. The match was played at the Łódź Stadium, Łódź on 15 June 2019 and was contested by Ukraine and South Korea. Ukraine won the match after defeating South Korea 3–1. It was the first-ever title for them and for a post-Soviet state.

== Road to the final ==
Ukraine
Round
South Korea
Opponent
Result
Group stage
Opponent
Result
United States
2–1
Match 1
Portugal
0–1
Qatar
1–0
Match 2
South Africa
1–0
Nigeria
1–1
Match 3
Argentina
2–1
Group D winners

Pos	Team	Pld	W	D	L	GF	GA	GD	Pts	Qualification
1	Ukraine	3	2	1	0	4	2	+2	7	Advance to knockout stage
2	United States	3	2	0	1	4	2	+2	6	Advance to knockout stage
3	Nigeria	3	1	1	1	5	3	+2	4	Advance to knockout stage
4	Qatar	3	0	0	3	0	6	−6	0	

Source: FIFA
Rules for classification: Group stage tiebreakers
Final standings
Group F runners-up

Pos	Team	Pld	W	D	L	GF	GA	GD	Pts	Qualification
1	Argentina	3	2	0	1	8	4	+4	6	Advance to knockout stage
2	South Korea	3	2	0	1	3	2	+1	6	Advance to knockout stage
3	Portugal	3	1	1	1	2	3	−1	4	
4	South Africa	3	0	1	2	3	7	−4	1	

Source: FIFA
Rules for classification: Group stage tiebreakers
Opponent
Result
Knockout stage
Opponent
Result
Panama
4–1
Round of 16
Japan
1–0
Colombia
1–0
Quarter-finals
Senegal
3–3 (aet) (3–2 pen.)
Italy
1–0
Semi-finals
Ecuador
1–0

== Match ==
=== Details ===
15 June 2019
18:00 CEST

Ukraine	3–1	South Korea
Supryaha 34', 53'; Tsitaishvili 89'	Report	Lee Kang-in 5' (pen.)

Łódź Stadium, Łódź
Attendance: 16,344
Referee: Ismail Elfath (United States)

Ukraine	South Korea

GK	1	Andriy Lunin
CB	3	Oleksandr Safronov
CB	13	Danylo Beskorovainyi
CB	2	Valeriy Bondar (c)
RM	17	Yukhym Konoplya	(yellow card) 86'
CM	8	Oleksiy Khakhlyov		(substituted off) 56'
CM	15	Kyrylo Dryshlyuk
LM	9	Viktor Korniyenko
RF	7	Heorhiy Tsitaishvili
CF	11	Vladyslav Supryaha		(substituted off) 63'
LF	10	Serhiy Buletsa		(substituted off) 88'
Substitutions:
MF	6	Maksym Chekh		(substituted on) 56'
FW	14	Danylo Sikan		(substituted on) 63'
MF	21	Oleksiy Kashchuk		(substituted on) 88'
Coach:
Oleksandr Petrakov

GK	1	Lee Gwang-yeon
RB	2	Hwang Tae-hyeon (c)
CB	4	Lee Ji-sol
CB	3	Lee Jae-ik	(yellow card) 56'
LB	19	Choi Jun		(substituted off) 80'
CM	5	Kim Hyun-woo	(yellow card) 33'
CM	6	Kim Jung-min
RW	10	Lee Kang-in
AM	20	Kim Se-yun		(substituted off) 46'
LW	18	Cho Young-wook		(substituted off) 63'
CF	9	Oh Se-hun	(yellow card) 78'
Substitutions:
FW	11	Um Won-sang		(substituted on) 46'
FW	7	Jeon Se-jin		(substituted on) 63'
DF	8	Lee Kyu-hyuk		(substituted on) 80'
Coach:
Chung Jung-yong

Assistant referees:
Kyle Atkins (United States)
Corey Parker (United States)
Fourth official:
Abdelkader Zitouni (Tahiti)
Video assistant referees:
Alan Kelly (Ireland)
Assistant video assistant referee:
Paweł Raczkowski (Poland)

Match rules:

- 90 minutes.
- 30 minutes of extra time if necessary.
- Penalty shoot-out if scores still level.
- Ten named eligible substitutes.
- Maximum of three substitutions, with a fourth allowed in extra time.
