= Lee Kang-in =

South Korean footballer (born 2001)

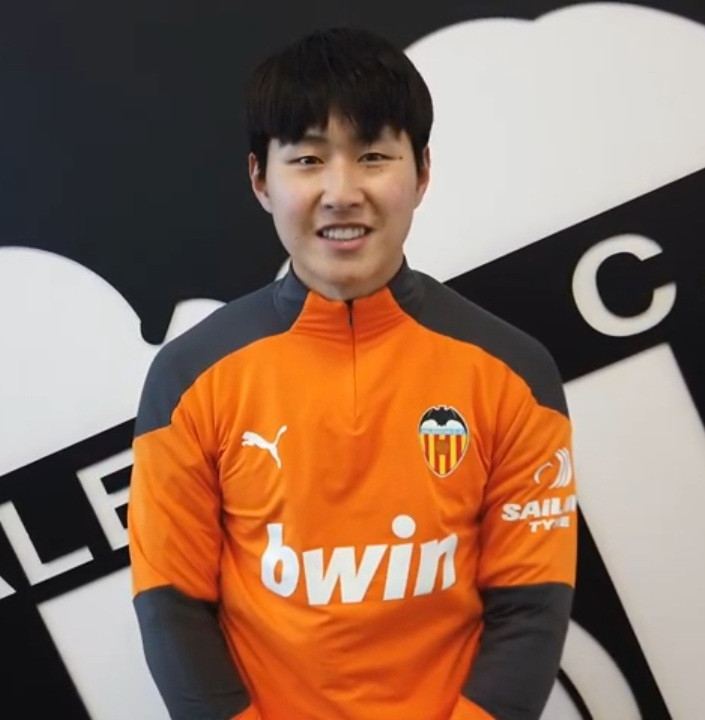
- Lee in 2021

Personal information
- Full name: Lee Kang-in
- Date of birth: 19 February 2001 (age 25)
- Place of birth: Incheon, South Korea
- Height: 1.73 m (5 ft 8 in)
- Positions: Attacking midfielder; winger

Team information
- Current team: Atlético Madrid
- Number: 7

Youth career
- 2009: Incheon United
- 2011: Flyings
- 2011–2017: Valencia

Senior career*
Years	Team	Apps	(Gls)
2017–2019	Valencia B	26	(4)
2018–2021	Valencia	44	(2)
2021–2023	Mallorca	66	(7)
2023–2026	Paris Saint-Germain	80	(12)
2026–	Atlético Madrid	13	(2)

International career^{‡}
2017–2019	South Korea U20	16	(7)
2021–2023	South Korea U23	15	(3)
2019–	South Korea	55	(11)
Medal record
Men's football
Representing South Korea
FIFA U-20 World Cup
Runner-up	2019 Poland
Asian Games
Gold medal – first place	2022 Hangzhou
- * Club domestic league appearances and goals as of 22 November 2026 (UTC) ‡ National team caps and goals as of 17 November 2026 (UTC)

- Lee Kang-in
- Hangul: 이강인
- Hanja: 李剛仁
- RR: I Gangin
- MR: I Kangin
- IPA: [i.ɡaŋ.in]

Lee Kang-in (Korean: 이강인; born 19 February 2001) is a South Korean professional footballer who plays as an attacking midfielder or winger for La Liga club Atlético Madrid and the South Korea national team.

A product of Valencia's youth academy, Lee made his professional debut at the age of 17 in 2018, becoming the youngest South Korean footballer to debut professionally in Europe. In his debut season, he won the Copa del Rey, before making his UEFA Champions League debut in his second professional season. Lee joined Mallorca in 2021, before joining French side Paris Saint-Germain in 2023. With PSG, he won three Ligue 1 titles and two Coupes de France, including two UEFA Champions League titles back-to-back in 2025 and 2026, with the former being part of a continental treble. This made Lee the first Asian, in global, professional football history to ever win multiple UEFA Champions League titles. Along with compatriot Cha Bum-kun, he is one of the two Asian players to have scored in a European final, scoring in the 2025 UEFA Super Cup.

In 2019, Lee won the Asian Young Footballer of the Year, the same year that he won the 2019 FIFA U-20 World Cup's Golden Ball award. Lee's team finished runner-up during the event. He later made his senior debut for South Korea in September 2019, representing his nation's squad for the 2022 FIFA World Cup, 2023 AFC Asian Cup and 2026 World Cup.

== Club career ==
=== Valencia ===
Lee joined Valencia's academy in July 2011. On 15 December 2017, he was called up to Valencia B (Mestalla). He had his debut on 21 December 2017, in a match with Deportivo Aragón, being substituted in the 82nd minute.

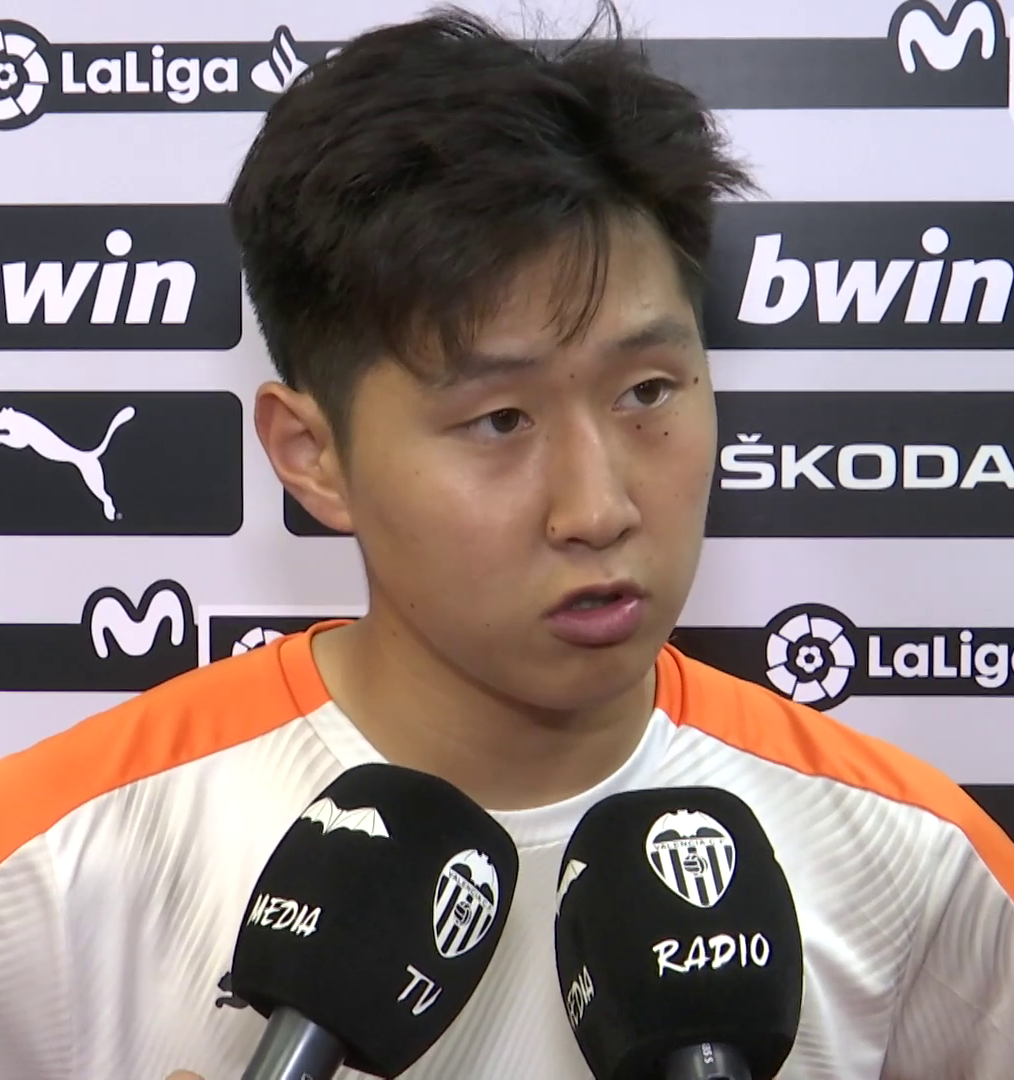
Lee with Valencia in 2019

Lee made his first team debut on 30 October 2018, starting and playing 83 minutes in a 2–1 win over Ebro in the Copa del Rey, becoming the youngest South Korean footballer to debut professionally in Europe.

Lee made his La Liga debut on 12 January 2019, substituting in for Denis Cheryshev in the 86th minute in a 1–1 draw with Real Valladolid during 2018–19 season. At 17 years, 10 months, and 24 days, Lee became the second youngest player in the 18–19 La Liga after Ander Barrenetxea from Real Sociedad who debuted at the age of 16 years, 11 months, and 24 days. He also became the youngest ever non-Spanish and the first Asian league debutant for Valencia, as well as the fifth Korean to play in La Liga. (Note: After Lee Chun-soo in 2003 for Real Sociedad, Lee Ho-jin in 2006 for Racing Santander, Park Chu-young in 2012 for Celta Vigo, and Kim Young-gyu in 2013 for Almería)

On 30 January 2019, Lee officially joined the Valencia first-team, receiving jersey number 16.

On 17 September 2019, Lee made his UEFA Champions League debut as a late substitute for Rodrigo in a 1–0 win against Chelsea, becoming the youngest ever Korean to debut in the competition at the age of 18 years and 6 months, a record previously held by Jeong Woo-yeong. He also became the 5th youngest ever to debut for Los Ches in the same competition. On 25 September 2019, he scored his first La Liga goal in a 3–3 draw against Getafe, to become the youngest non-Spanish to score for Valencia, aged 18 years and 219 days old, breaking the previous record of Mohamed Sissoko who scored in the 2003–04 UEFA Cup; and the third youngest ever, only behind Juan Mena and Fernando Gómez. (Note: On 1 November 2020, Yunus Musah broke Lee Kang-in's record, to become the youngest non-Spanish to score for Valencia, aged 17 years and 338 days.) His record as the youngest non-Spanish goalscorer for Valencia was broken the following season by American teammate Yunus Musah.

On 13 September 2020, Lee became the youngest player, aged 19 years and 207 days, to assist two goals in a La Liga match in the 21st century, in a 4–2 win over Levante, breaking the previous record of Juan Mata in 2008, aged 20 years and 150 days. Despite rejecting several renewal offers from the club throughout the year, he featured regularly under Javi Gracia as the Che ended the campaign on a mid-table position.

After being on the transfer list during the entire pre-season, Lee terminated his contract with Valencia on 29 August 2021.

=== Mallorca ===
On 21 August 2021, fellow La Liga club Mallorca confirmed the free transfer of Lee, signing on a four-year contract.

During the 2022–23 season, Lee became one of the best dribblers in the Big Five European leagues, with the highest dribble success rate and the sixth-highest number of successful dribbles.

=== Paris Saint-Germain ===
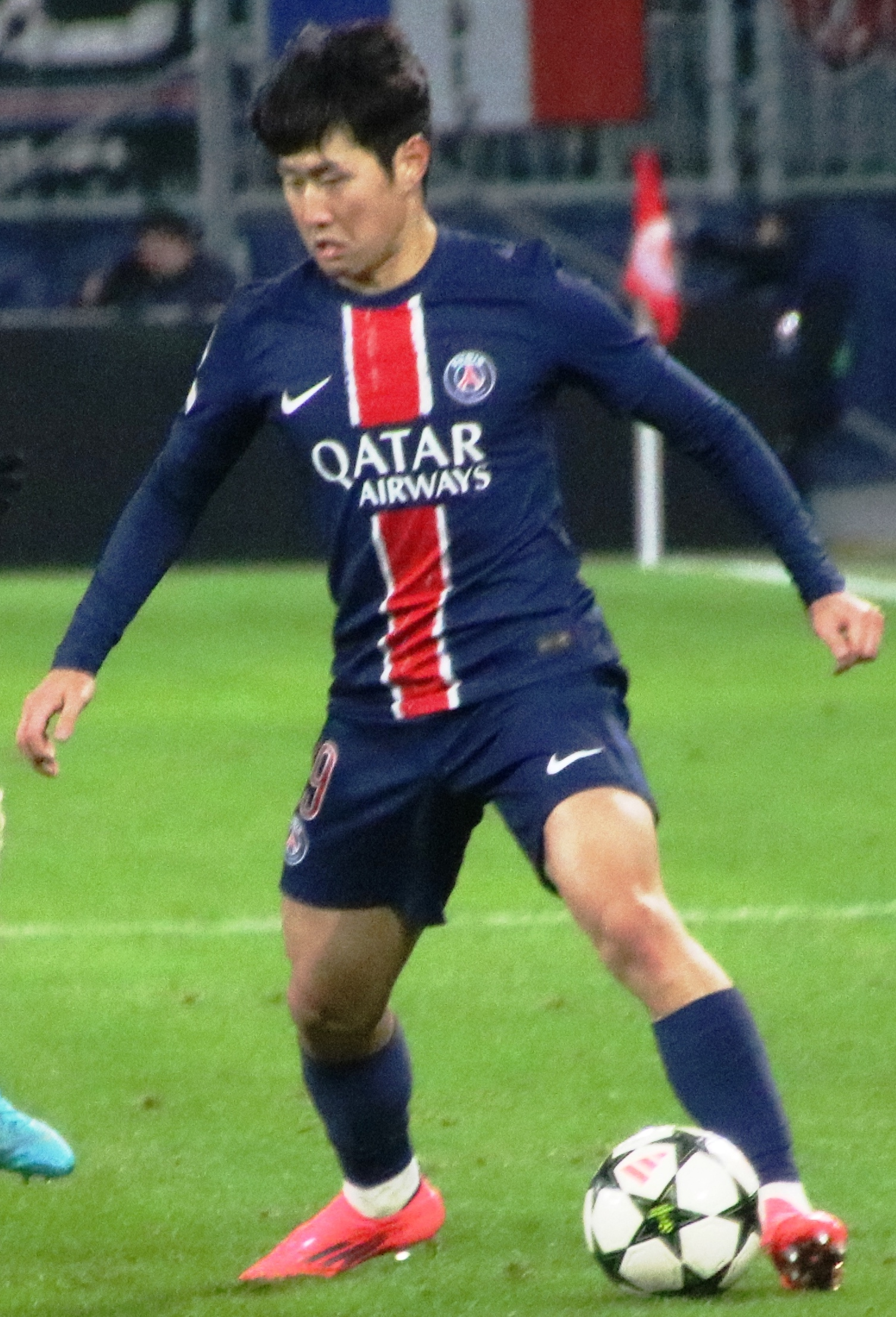
Lee with Paris Saint-Germain in 2024

On 8 July 2023, Ligue 1 club Paris Saint-Germain announced the signing of Lee on a five-year contract running through 2028, becoming the first ever South Korean to play for the club. A transfer fee of €22 million was paid out to Mallorca after Lee passed his medical at the start of June.

On 12 August, he made his Ligue 1 debut in a 0–0 draw against Lorient at the Parc des Princes. On 25 October, he scored his first PSG goal and his first Champions League goal in a 3–0 victory over AC Milan. On 3 November, he scored his first Ligue 1 goal in a 3–0 win over Montpellier. On 3 January 2024, he was named man of the match, after he scored the opening goal in the 2–0 Trophée des Champions win over Toulouse, where he won his first title with the club. As PSG won the Double of the Ligue 1 and the Coupe de France in the 2023–24 season, he became the first Asian player to win the Ligue 1. (Note: He also became the second Asian player to win the Coupe de France. (The first winner is Ado Onaiwu, who won the 2022–23 edition with Toulouse.))

In the 2024–25 season, Lee became the second Asian ever to receive a UEFA Champions League medal, following compatriot Park Ji-sung, but his playing time during the second half of the season decreased sharply due to Khvicha Kvaratskhelia's arrival and Désiré Doué's growth. He considered his transfer in the summer despite winning a continental treble, whereas the club was less willing to sell him actively. On 15 June 2025, he came on as a 72nd-minute substitute and scored his first FIFA Club World Cup goal on a penalty kick in a 4–0 win over Atlético Madrid.

At the 2025 UEFA Super Cup on 13 August, Lee was put into the field in the 67th minute when Tottenham Hotspur held a 2–0 lead. He scored PSG's first goal, which underlay a 2–2 tie, and their third penalty goal in a 4–3 penalty shoot-out win. During the 2025–26 season, he still remained a back-up for PSG as they secured their second successive Champions League title. While PSG's main players concentrated on winning the Champions League, he helped the club win their 12th Ligue 1 title in 14 years. On 30 May 2026, he became the first ever Asian to lift multiple UEFA Champions League trophies when his teammates defeated Arsenal on penalties in the final.

=== Atlético Madrid ===
On 25 July 2026, Lee signed a five-year contract with Atlético Madrid till June 2031. The deal was worth approximately €40 million, with €35 million fixed plus €5 million in add-ons. In his first competitive game for Atlético against Málaga, he scored the opening goal and was the match's MVP; his goal would go on to win La Liga Goal of the Month for August 2026. Less than a month later, he won the MVP award again after a dominant performance against Osasuna.

== International career ==
=== 2019 U-20 World Cup ===
Lee was selected to play for the South Korea U-20 football team in the 2019 FIFA U-20 World Cup and played in every group and knockout match, leading his team to a historic runner-up finish in the tournament and scoring two goals and four assists in seven games, including a goal in the final. As a result, he received the Golden Ball award as the tournament's best player.

=== 2022 World Cup ===
Lee received his first call up to the senior South Korea national football team in March 2019 for friendlies against Bolivia and Colombia, and became the 7th youngest to be in the South Korean national team. On 5 September 2019, Lee made his international debut in a 2–2 draw friendly match against Georgia as a starter.

Lee was called up for friendlies in September 2022 just before the 2022 FIFA World Cup by showing his evolution on both side of the ball in La Liga. He only participated in team training without appearances in the friendlies, but was selected for the 26-men World Cup team. He assisted Cho Gue-sung's header with an accurate cross in the second group match against Ghana.

=== 2023 Asian Cup ===
Lee was exempted from mandatory military service after winning the 2022 Asian Games in October 2023. In a senior friendly against Tunisia just after the Asian Games, he led South Korea to a 4–0 victory by scoring two goals including a free-kick goal, which were his first and second goals for senior national team respectively.

Lee was called up the South Korean squad for the 2023 AFC Asian Cup. He led South Korea to the knockout stage by scoring two goals in a 3–1 victory over Bahrain and having a free-kick goal and an assist from a corner in a 3–3 draw with Malaysia. He created the highest number of key passes and successful crosses until the quarter-finals. After South Korea was eliminated in the semi-finals by Jordan, however, it was reported that he had been in conflict with veteran players in the national team including captain Son Heung-min before the defeat.

=== 2026 World Cup ===
Lee received a call-up from Hong Myung-bo to join South Korea's squad for the 2026 FIFA World Cup. He assisted his teammate Hwang In-beom's goal against Czech Republic.

== Media ==
In 2007, the six-year-old Lee was featured in the third season of the KBS N Sports reality football show Fly Shoot Dori. After his exceptional performance, he passed through Yoo Sang-chul's youth academy and in 2009 joined the Incheon United U-12 youth team. He later attended Seokjeong Elementary School in Incheon and played for Flyings FC. In January 2011, he went to Spain under the recommendation of his youth team coach and took part in trials for the youth teams of Spanish clubs Villarreal and Valencia.

On August 14, 2026, Lee signed an exclusive contract with The Black Label to manage his activities outside of football.

== Personal life ==
Lee was born on 19 February 2001 in Incheon, South Korea, as the youngest of three children. His father, Lee Woon-seong, was a taekwondo instructor in Incheon and a big football fan (especially of Diego Maradona).

== Career statistics ==
=== Club ===
As of match played 22 November 2026

Appearances and goals by club, season and competition
Club	Season	League			National cup (Note: Includes Copa del Rey, Coupe de France)		Europe		Other		Total	
Club	Season	Division	Apps	Goals	Apps	Goals	Apps	Goals	Apps	Goals	Apps	Goals
Valencia B	2017–18	Segunda División B	11	1	—		—		—		11	1
Valencia B	2018–19	Segunda División B	15	3	—		—		—		15	3
Valencia B	Total		26	4	—		—		—		26	4
Valencia	2018–19	La Liga	3	0	6	0	2 (Note: Appearances in UEFA Europa League)	0	—		11	0
Valencia	2019–20	La Liga	17	2	2	0	5 (Note: Appearances in UEFA Champions League)	0	0	0	24	2
Valencia	2020–21	La Liga	24	0	3	1	—		—		27	1
Valencia	Total		44	2	11	1	7	0	0	0	62	3
Mallorca	2021–22	La Liga	30	1	4	0	—		—		34	1
Mallorca	2022–23	La Liga	36	6	3	0	—		—		39	6
Mallorca	Total		66	7	7	0	—		—		73	7
Paris Saint-Germain	2023–24	Ligue 1	23	3	3	0	9	1	1 (Note: Appearance in Trophée des Champions)	1	36	5
Paris Saint-Germain	2024–25	Ligue 1	30	6	3	0	11	0	5 (Note: One appearance in Trophée des Champions, four appearances and one goal in FIFA Club World Cup)	1	49	7
Paris Saint-Germain	2025–26	Ligue 1	27	3	0	0	10	0	2 (Note: One appearance and one goal in UEFA Super Cup, one appearance in FIFA Intercontinental Cup)	1	39	4
Paris Saint-Germain	Total		80	12	6	0	30	1	8	3	124	16
Atlético Madrid	2026–27	La Liga	13	2	0	0	3	0	0	0	16	2
Career total			229	27	24	1	40	1	8	3	301	32

=== International ===
As of match played 17 November 2026

Appearances and goals by national team and year
National team	Year	Apps	Goals
South Korea
South Korea	2019	3	0
South Korea	2020	2	0
South Korea	2021	1	0
South Korea	2022	4	0
South Korea	2023	8	4
South Korea	2024	17	6
South Korea	2025	9	1
South Korea	2026	11	0
Total		55	11

As of match played 28 September 2026
Scores and results list South Korea's goal tally first, score column indicates score after each Lee goal.

List of international goals scored by Lee Kang-in
No.	Date	Venue	Cap	Opponent	Score	Result	Competition
1	13 October 2023	Seoul World Cup Stadium, Seoul, South Korea	15	Tunisia	1–0	4–0	Friendly
2	13 October 2023	Seoul World Cup Stadium, Seoul, South Korea	15	Tunisia	2–0	4–0	Friendly
3	17 October 2023	Suwon World Cup Stadium, Suwon, South Korea	16	Vietnam	5–0	6–0	Friendly
4	16 November 2023	Seoul World Cup Stadium, Seoul, South Korea	17	Singapore	5–0	5–0	2026 FIFA World Cup qualification
5	15 January 2024	Jassim bin Hamad Stadium, Al Rayyan, Qatar	20	Bahrain	2–1	3–1	2023 AFC Asian Cup
6	15 January 2024	Jassim bin Hamad Stadium, Al Rayyan, Qatar	20	Bahrain	3–1	3–1	2023 AFC Asian Cup
7	25 January 2024	Al Janoub Stadium, Al Wakrah, Qatar	22	Malaysia	2–2	3–3	2023 AFC Asian Cup
8	6 June 2024	National Stadium, Kallang, Singapore	28	Singapore	1–0	7–0	2026 FIFA World Cup qualification
9	6 June 2024	National Stadium, Kallang, Singapore	28	Singapore	4–0	7–0	2026 FIFA World Cup qualification
10	11 June 2024	Seoul World Cup Stadium, Seoul, South Korea	29	China	1–0	1–0	2026 FIFA World Cup qualification
11	10 June 2025	Seoul World Cup Stadium, Seoul, South Korea	38	Kuwait	2–0	4–0	2026 FIFA World Cup qualification

== Honours ==
Valencia

- Copa del Rey: 2018–19

Paris Saint-Germain

- Ligue 1: 2023–24, 2024–25, 2025–26
- Coupe de France: 2023–24, 2024–25
- Trophée des Champions: 2023, 2024, 2025
- UEFA Champions League: 2024–25, 2025–26
- UEFA Super Cup: 2025
- FIFA Intercontinental Cup: 2025
- FIFA Club World Cup runner-up: 2025

South Korea U20

- FIFA U-20 World Cup runner-up: 2019

South Korea U23

- Asian Games: 2022

Individual

- Toulon Tournament Best XI: 2018
- FIFA U-20 World Cup Golden Ball: 2019
- AFC Youth Player of the Year: 2019
- Korean FA Young Player of the Year: 2019
- Diario AS Midfielder of the Season: 2022–23
- Ligue 1 Goal of the Month: November 2023
- Trophée des Champions Best Player: 2023
- IFFHS Asian Men's Team of the Year: 2023, 2024, 2025
- AFC Asian Cup Team of the Tournament: 2023
- AFC Asian International Player of the Year: 2025, 2026
- Korean FA Player of the Year: 2025
- La Liga Goal of the Month: August 2026
