= Robert Khalaidjian =

Armenian Soviet footballer (1958–2025)

Personal information
- Date of birth: 24 June 1958
- Date of death: 9 October 2025 (aged 67)
- Place of death: Yerevan, Armenian SSR, USSR
- Height: 1.67 m (5 ft 6 in)
- Position: Forward

Senior career*
Years	Team	Apps	(Gls)
1975–1978	Ararat Yerevan	37	(4)
1978	FC Kotayk	10	(4)
1982–1983	FC Kotayk	44	(21)
1984	Spartak Hoktemberyan	12	(1)
1987	Spartak Hoktemberyan	20	(5)
1988	Lori FC	24	(10)
- * Club domestic league appearances and goals

Robert Khalaidjian (Russian: Роберт Андреевич Халайджан; 24 June 1958 – 9 October 2025) was an Armenian Soviet footballer who played as a forward. He died on 9 October 2025, at the age of 67.

== Honours ==
Soviet Union U20

- FIFA World Youth Championship: 1977
