= Italo Acconcia =

Italian footballer and manager

Personal information
- Date of birth: 20 April 1925
- Place of birth: Castelvecchio Subequo, Italy
- Date of death: 12 February 1983 (aged 57)
- Place of death: Florence, Italy
- Position: Midfielder

Senior career*
| Years | Team | Apps | (Gls) |
| 1942–1946 | L'Aquila | | |
| 1946–1947 | Catanzaro | 32 | (1) |
| 1947–1950 | Fiorentina | 78 | (4) |
| 1950–1951 | → Udinese (loan) | 26 | (1) |
| 1951–1952 | Roma | 33 | (0) |
| 1952–1954 | Genoa | 36 | (0) |
| 1954–1955 | Modena | 9 | (0) |
| 1955–1956 | Salernitana | 20 | (1) |
| 1956–1957 | Pistoiese | 24 | (0) |
| 1957–1961 | Sangiovannese | 99 | (3) |
| 1961–1962 | Empoli | | |

Managerial career
- 1962: Pistoiese
- 1981: Italy U-21
- * Club domestic league appearances and goals as of 17 February 2015

Italo Acconcia (20 April 1925 – 12 February 1983) was an Italian football player and manager who played as a midfielder. He spent most of his career in the Italian Serie A. In 1981, he managed the national under-21 team during the 1981 FIFA World Youth Championship.

== Honours ==
Roma

- Serie B Championship: 1951–52

Genoa

- Serie B Championship: 1952–53
