= Kadhim Nasser =

Iraqi association football player

Personal information
- Full name: Kadhim Nasser Hussein
- Date of birth: 9 January 1960 (age 66)
- Place of birth: Iraq
- Position: Goalkeeper

International career
Years	Team	Apps	(Gls)
1979	Iraq		

Kadhim Nasser (born 9 January 1960) is an Iraqi former football goalkeeper who played for Iraq at the 1977 FIFA World Youth Championship.

Nasser played for the national team in 1979.
