= Helmut Wartinger =

Austrian footballer

Personal information
- Date of birth: 13 September 1959 (age 67)

International career
Years	Team	Apps	(Gls)
1980	Austria	1	(0)

Helmut Wartinger (born 13 September 1959) is an Austrian footballer. He played in one match for the Austria national football team in 1980.
