= Juan Mena =

Spanish footballer (1924–1984)

Personal information
- Full name: Juan Mena Tormo
- Date of birth: 8 November 1924
- Place of birth: Torrent, Spain
- Date of death: 1 June 1984 (aged 59)
- Position: Forward

Senior career*
Years	Team	Apps	(Gls)
1941–1947	Valencia	27	(7)
1947–1949	Hércules	43	(22)
1949–1952	Valencia	17	(9)
1952–1954	Valencia Mestalla	20	(6)
1954–1955	Real Zaragoza	7	(2)
Total		114	(46)
- * Club domestic league appearances and goals

Juan Mena Tormo (8 November 1924 – 1 June 1984) was a Spanish footballer who played as a forward for La Liga club Valencia.

== Career ==
On 14 December 1941, Mena scored in his debut for Valencia in a 7–3 win over Celta de Vigo, aged 17 years and 36 days. He later won the 1941–42 La Liga with Valencia, which was their first league title ever.

He played for Valencia until 1947, where he won another two La Liga titles, before joining Hércules for two seasons. In 1949, he returned to Valencia, then he played for two seasons for Valencia Mestalla. He last played for Real Zaragoza in the 1954–55 season.

== Honours ==
Valencia

- La Liga: 1941–42, 1943–44, 1946–47
- Copa del Generalísimo: 1954
- Copa Eva Duarte: 1949
