= Eliseo Rivero =

Uruguayan footballer (born 1957)

Personal information
- Full name: Eliseo Rivero Pérez
- Date of birth: 27 December 1957 (age 68)
- Place of birth: Montevideo, Uruguay
- Position: Defender

International career
Years	Team	Apps	(Gls)
1983–1986	Uruguay	7	(0)
Medal record
Representing Uruguay
Copa América
Winner	1983

Eliseo Rivero Pérez (born 27 December 1957) is a former Uruguayan footballer. He played for the club C.A. Peñarol.

Rivero made seven appearances for the Uruguay national football team from 1983 to 1986, and played at the 1977 FIFA World Youth Championship and the 1986 FIFA World Cup.
