= Vladimir Bodrov =

Russian footballer and coach

Personal information
- Full name: Vladimir Vasilyevich Bodrov
- Date of birth: 1 April 1958 (age 68)
- Place of birth: Khimki, Russian SFSR
- Height: 1.82 m (6 ft 0 in)
- Positions: Forward; midfielder

Team information
- Current team: FShM Moscow (academy coach)

Youth career
- FC Dynamo Moscow

Senior career*
Years	Team	Apps	(Gls)
1975–1980	FC Dynamo Moscow	0	(0)
1980	FC Volga Kalinin	20	(2)
1981	FC Saturn Rybinsk	30	(5)
1982–1984	FC Shinnik Yaroslavl	121	(16)
1985–1986	FC Lokomotiv Moscow	66	(2)
1987	FC Kairat	0	(0)
1987–1990	FC Shinnik Yaroslavl	134	(9)
1990–1991	TJ Vagónka Poprad		
1991	FC Volga Tver	19	(1)
1992–1993	TJ Vagónka Poprad		
1994–1997	FC Avtomobilist Noginsk	120	(36)
2000	FC TEKS Ivanteyevka		

Managerial career
- 1994–1997: FC Avtomobilist Noginsk
- 1998: FC Oryol (assistant)
- 1999: Dinaburg FC
- 1999–2000: FC Spartak Moscow (assistant)
- 2000–2008: FC Dynamo Moscow (academy)
- 2008: FC Zelenograd
- 2009–2018: FC Spartak Moscow (academy)
- 2019–: FShM Moscow (academy)
- * Club domestic league appearances and goals

Vladimir Vasilyevich Bodrov (Russian: Владимир Васильевич Бодров; born 1 April 1958) is a Russian football coach and a former player. He is the head coach of FShM Moscow academy.

== Honours ==
- 1977 FIFA World Youth Championship winner with the Soviet Union.
