= Ahmad Ali Heydari =

Iranian philosopher (born 1963)

- احمدعلی حیدر (Persian)
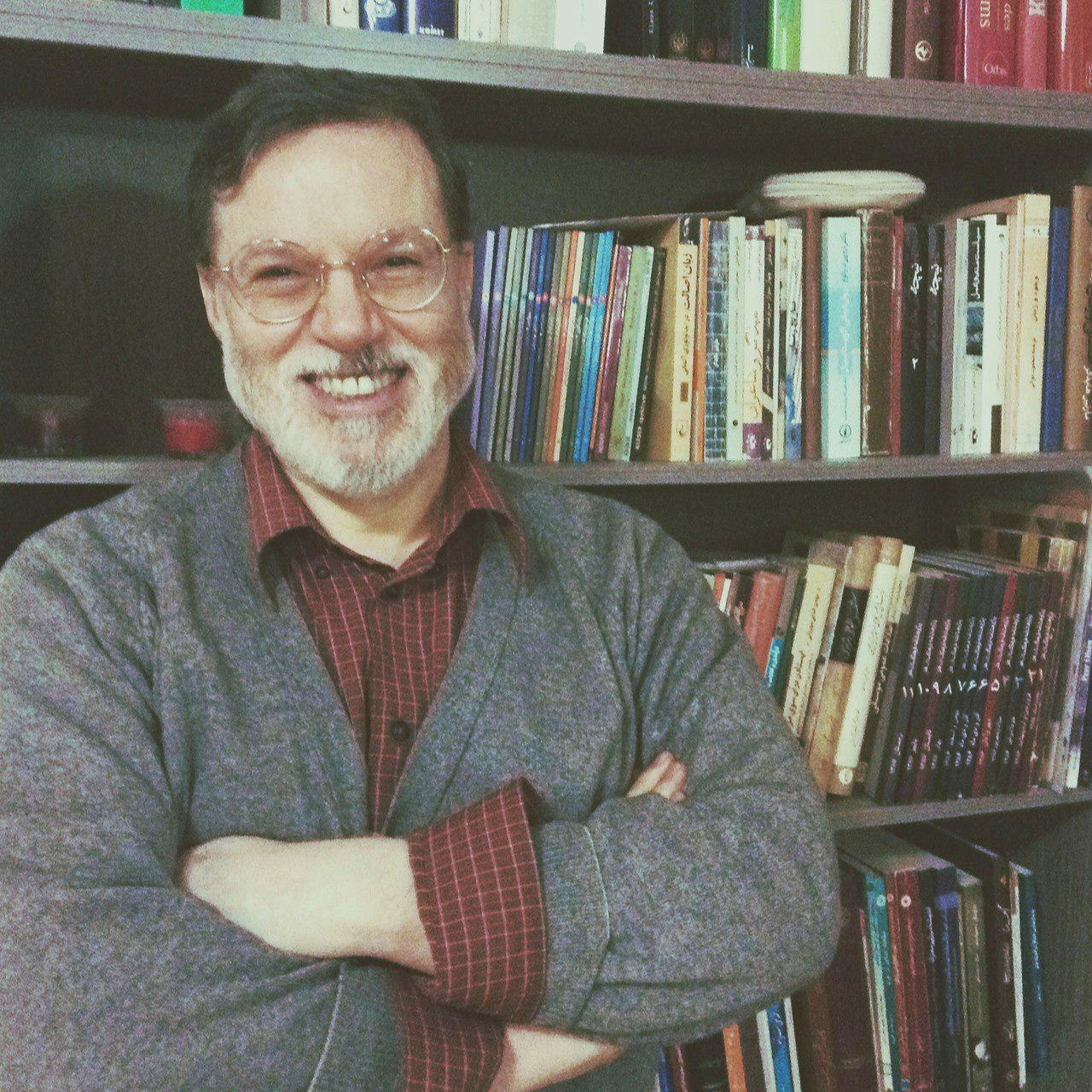
- Born: 1963 (age 62–63); Iran

Philosophical work
- Era: 21st century Philosophy
- Region: Western Philosophy
- School: Continental
- Main interests: Contemporary Iranian philosophy

Ahmad Ali Heydari (Persian: احمدعلی حیدری; born 1963) is an Iranian philosopher and professor of philosophy at Allameh Tabataba'i University known for his works on ethics and his research on the reception of Western philosophy by Iranian thinkers. He received his PhD in philosophy from University of Bonn in 2003. Heydari is a member of board of directors of Iranian Society of Intercultural Philosophy (ISIPH).

== Bibliography ==
- Wegbereiter der iranischen Moderne: Eine philosophische Analyse ihrer Befürworter und Gegner, SVH, 2010
- Perspectives on the thought of "Professor Rizvok Ehashi" and Intercultural Philosophy in Japan, Tehran: Allameh Tabatabaei University Press, 2016

=== Translations ===
- Ethik für junge Menschen, José Galindo and Héctor Zagal, Tehran: Hekmat
- Vorlesungen über Ethik, Ernst Tugendhat, Tehran: University of Tehran Press
- Martin Heidegger: Sein und Zeit, Andreas Luckner, Tehran: Elmi
- Knowledge and Faith: Collected Essays, Jürgen Habermas, Tehran: University of Tehran Press

== See also ==
- Iranian philosophy
