= Ayad Mohammed Ali =

Iraqi association football player

Personal information
- Full name: Ayad Mohammed Ali Shawkat
- Date of birth: 1 July 1956 (age 70)
- Place of birth: Iraq
- Position: Defender

International career
Years	Team	Apps	(Gls)
1978	Iraq		

Ayad Mohammed Ali (born 1 July 1956) is an Iraqi former football defender who played for Iraq at the 1977 FIFA World Youth Championship.

Ayad played for the national team in 1978.
