= Johann Koller =

Austrian hockey player

Personal information
- Nationality: Austrian
- Born: 3 March 1921 Vienna, Austria
- Died: 21 January 1999 (aged 77) Vienna, Austria

Sport
- Sport: Field hockey

Johann Koller (3 March 1921 – 21 January 1999) was an Austrian field hockey player. He competed at the 1948 Summer Olympics and the 1952 Summer Olympics.
