= Wamidh Khudhor =

Iraqi association football player

Personal information
- Full name: Wamidh Khudhor Abbas
- Date of birth: 1 October 1958 (age 68)
- Place of birth: Iraq
- Position: Midfielder

International career
Years	Team	Apps	(Gls)
1977	Iraq U20	8	(1)
1978–1981	Iraq		

Wamidh Khudhor (born 1 October 1958) is a former Iraqi football midfielder who played for Iraq at the 1977 FIFA World Youth Championship.

Khudhor played for Iraq between 1978 and 1981.
