= Gaston Adjoukoua =

Ivorian footballer

Personal information
- Date of birth: 14 February 1958
- Place of birth: Ivory Coast
- Date of death: 23 August 2015 (aged 57)
- Position: Midfielder

Senior career*
Years	Team	Apps	(Gls)
1982–1989	Africa Sports d'Abidjan	-	(-)

International career
1977–1984	Ivory Coast	6	(0)
- * Club domestic league appearances and goals

Gaston Adjoukoua was an Ivorian football midfielder who played for Ivory Coast in the 1980 and 1984 African Cup of Nations. He also played for Asec d'Abidjan at club level.
