= Sergei Igumin =

Russian Soviet footballer

Personal information
- Full name: Sergei Viktorovich Igumin
- Date of birth: 9 May 1958 (age 68)
- Height: 1.79 m (5 ft 10 1/2 in)
- Position: Defender

Senior career*
Years	Team	Apps	(Gls)
1976–1979	PFC CSKA Moscow	7	(0)
1979–1981	FC Volga Kalinin	79	(0)
1984–1985	FC SKA Khabarovsk	70	(0)
1986–1988	FC Krasnaya Presnya Moscow	88	(0)
1988	FC Fakel Voronezh	11	(0)
1989	FC Arsenal Tula	29	(0)

Managerial career
- 1989: FC Arsenal Tula
- * Club domestic league appearances and goals

Sergei Viktorovich Igumin (Russian: Сергей Викторович Игумин; born 9 May 1958) is a former Russian Soviet football player.

== Honours ==
- 1977 FIFA World Youth Championship winner with the Soviet Union.
