= Salvador Campello =

Spanish footballer

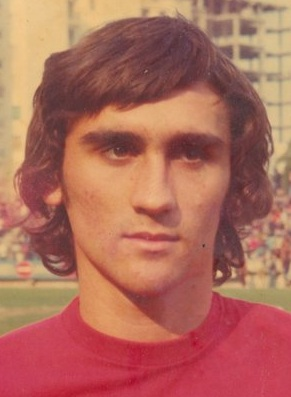

Personal information
- Full name: Salvador Estañ Campello
- Date of birth: 6 June 1958 (age 68)
- Place of birth: Callosa de Segura, Alicante, Spain
- Position: Defender

Youth career
- –1976: Elche

Senior career*
Years	Team	Apps	(Gls)
1976–1979	Elche	49	(0)
1979–1986	Real Murcia	171	(2)
1987–1988	Tenerife	26	(0)
1988–1989	Marino	29	(0)
Total		275	(2)

International career
1976	Spain U18	1	(0)
- * Club domestic league appearances and goals

Salvador Estañ Campello (born 6 June 1958), is a Spanish retired footballer who played as a defender.

== Club career ==
Campello started at Elche and was honoured by his club with a commemorative plaque in 2014 for his services.

== International career ==
He was called up to the Spain under-20 side for the 1977 FIFA World Youth Championship in Tunisia and the Spain under-21 side in 1980, but did not make an appearance for either.
