= Asghar Sadri =

Iranian footballer

Personal information
- Full name: Asghar Sadri
- Date of birth: 2 October 1957 (age 69)
- Place of birth: Iran
- Position: Defender

Youth career
- 1971–?: Rah Ahan F.C.

Senior career*
Years	Team	Apps	(Gls)
?–1977	Bargh Shiraz		
1977–1979	Shahbaz		
1979	MVV Maastricht		
1980	F.C. Waterschei		
1980–1984	KFC Diest		
1984–1989	K.V.C. Westerlo		
1989–1991	F.C. Beringen		
1991–1992	K.F.C. Tielen		

International career
1977	Iran-U20		
1976–1978	Iran		
- * Club domestic league appearances and goals

Asghar Sadri (Persian: اصغر صدری; born 2 October 1957) is a former Iranian football player.

== Playing career ==
He started playing at youth level for Rah Ahan F.C., then at senior level for Bargh Shiraz F.C. and Shahbaz. In 1979, at age of 22 moved to Germany to study architecture. Whilst in Europe he started his European football career with Dutch outfit MVV Maastricht which was then followed by a decade playing for clubs in Belgium.

== International career ==
He was a member of the Iran national under-20 football team at 1977 FIFA World Youth Championship. He was a member of Iran national football team at qualifications for 1976 AFC Asian Cup and 1978 FIFA World Cup.
