= Emilio Gómez (footballer) =

Spanish footballer

Personal information
- Full name: Emilio Gómez Gallardo
- Date of birth: 14 January 1958 (age 68)
- Place of birth: Tarragona, Spain
- Height: 1.66 m (5 ft 5 1/2 in)
- Position: Midfielder

Youth career
- –1976: Barcelona

Senior career*
Years	Team	Apps	(Gls)
1976–1977	Barcelona Atlètic	25	(4)
1979–1980	Gimnàstic	21	(5)
1980–1984	Celta	85	(6)
1988–1992	Andorra	109	(7)

International career
1977	Spain U20	1	(0)

Managerial career
- 1998–2000: Andorra
- 2002–2004: Andorra
- 2012–2014: Santa Coloma
- * Club domestic league appearances and goals

Emilio Gómez Gallardo (born 14 January 1958), commonly known as Emilio, is a Spanish retired footballer who played as a midfielder, and is a manager.

== Club career ==
Emilio started his career with the youth ranks of FC Barcelona, playing for the club's 'B' team in the 1976–77 Segunda División, before spending a season with fellow second division side Gimnàstic de Tarragona. In 1980, Emilio moved to Celta de Vigo, at the time also playing in the second division, before winning promotion to La Liga in the 1981–82 season.

== International career ==
Emilio represented the Spain under-20 side at the 1977 FIFA World Youth Championship in Tunisia, featuring in one game.
