= Aleksei Ilyin (footballer, born 1958) =

Russian footballer

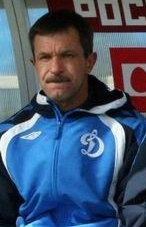
- Ilyin as coach of Dynamo Moscow in 2007

Personal information
- Full name: Aleksei Viktorovich Ilyin
- Date of birth: 1 May 1958 (age 68)
- Place of birth: Moscow, Russian SFSR
- Height: 1.73 m (5 ft 8 in)
- Positions: Defender; midfielder

Youth career
- FC Lokomotiv Moscow

Senior career*
Years	Team	Apps	(Gls)
1975–1979	FC Lokomotiv Moscow	43	(0)
1980–1981	FC Kairat	66	(0)
1982–1985	FC Lokomotiv Moscow	128	(3)
1986	FC Kolos Nikopol	26	(0)
1987–1991	FC Geolog Tyumen	177	(8)
1992–1993	FC Veres Rivne	37	(2)
1993	FC Dynamo Vologda	25	(2)
1994	FC Irtysh Tobolsk	16	(1)

Managerial career
- 2003: FC Saturn-RenTV Ramenskoye (assistant)
- 2004: FC Rostov (assistant)
- 2005–2006: FC Dynamo Moscow (assistant)
- 2006: FC Terek Grozny (assistant)
- 2007–2010: FC Dynamo Moscow (assistant)
- 2010–2011: FC Dynamo Bryansk (assistant)
- * Club domestic league appearances and goals

Aleksei Viktorovich Ilyin (Russian: Алексей Викторович Ильин; born 1 May 1958) is a Russian professional football coach and a former player.

== Honours ==
- 1977 FIFA World Youth Championship winner with the Soviet Union national under-20 football team (started in all 5 games at the tournament).
