= Vyacheslav Ruzhentsev =

Ukrainian professional footballer

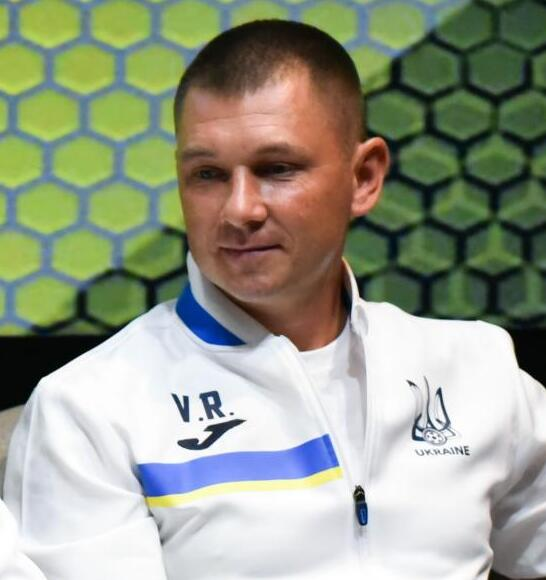

Personal information
- Full name: Vyacheslav Volodymyrovych Ruzhentsev
- Date of birth: 6 November 1980 (age 45)
- Place of birth: Kyiv, Ukrainian SSR
- Height: 1.80 m (5 ft 11 in)
- Position: Defender

Youth career
- 199?–1998: Obolon Kyiv

Senior career*
Years	Team	Apps	(Gls)
1998–1999	Obolon Kyiv	0	(0)
1998	→ Obolon-2 Kyiv	7	(0)
1999–2001	Dnipro Dnipropetrovsk	0	(0)
1999–2001	→ Dnipro-2 Dnipropetrovsk	16	(1)
2000–2001	→ Dnipro-3 Dnipropetrovsk	14	(0)
2001	Dinaz Vyshhorod	3	(1)
2001–2007	Nafkom Brovary	139	(4)
2004	→ Ros Bila Tserkva (loan)	1	(0)
2009	KNTEU Kyiv	6	(0)
2010–2011	FC Bucha		
2013–2019	Desna Pohreby	29	(2)

Managerial career
- 2009: Desna Pohreby
- 2012–2013: Desna Pohreby
- 2014: Taiher Hoholiv
- 2014: Gandzasar Kapan (assistant)
- 2015: Desna Pohreby
- 2022–2023: Ukraine (fitness coach)
- * Club domestic league appearances and goals

Vyacheslav Ruzhentsev (Ukrainian: В'ячеслав Володимирович Руженцев; born 6 November 1980) is a retired Ukrainian professional footballer who played as a defender and current football fitness coach. In 2019 he was a member of the Petrakov's coaching staff for the Ukraine U-20 that became the world champions, for which Ruzhentsev was honored with title "Honored state functionary of physical culture and sport of Ukraine".

== Career ==
Ruzhentsev is a product of his native Kyiv's Obolon youth academy system.

He spent his career in the different Ukrainian clubs of the lower leagues, and from 2009 began to work as a football fitness coach for physical training and rehabilitation.

On 29 August 2021 he was appointed as a fitness coach for the Ukraine national football team.

== Honours ==
Desna Pohreby

- Kyiv Region Cup: 2017

Bucha

- Ukrainian Amateur Cup: 2011
