= Árpád Toma =

Hungarian footballer (born 1958)

Personal information
- Full name: Árpád Toma
- Date of birth: 3 January 1958 (age 68)
- Place of birth: Pécs, Hungary
- Position: Defender

Youth career
- 1972-1977: Pécs Sports School

Senior career*
| Years | Team | Apps | (Gls) |
| 1977-1989 | Pécsi MFC | 312 | (9) |
| 1989-1990 | Komlói Bányász SK | | |
| 1990-1991 | Kemi City F.C. | | |
| 1991-1992 | Komlói Bányász SK | | |
| 1992 | SV Sallern | | |

International career
| 1987 | Hungary | 5 | (0) |

Managerial career
- 2000-2001: Pécsi MFC
- 2001-2010: Pécsi MFC U16
- 2010: Sellye
- * Club domestic league appearances and goals

Árpád Toma (born 3 January 1958) is a former Hungarian professional footballer who played as a defender, later became a football coach. He was a member of the Hungary national team.

== Career ==
He started playing football at the Pécs Sports School in 1972. In 1977 he made his debut in the top flight for Pécsi MFC. In the 1985-86 season he won the silver medal with the team. Until 1989 he played in 351 league matches and scored 9 goals. After that he played one season for Komlói Bányász SK, before moving to Kemi City F.C. in Finland, from where he returned to Komlói Bányasz SK. In 1992 he played for the German team SV Sallern.

=== National team ===
In 1987 he played five times for the Hungary national team.

=== As a coach ===
On 18 September 2000, he was appointed head coach of the Pécsi MFC senior team. Later he worked for the youth teams of Pécsi. In 2010 he coached Sellye.

== Achievements ==
- Nemzeti Bajnokság I (NB I)
  - Second: 1985-86
- Magyar Kupa (MNK)
  - Finalist: 1987
