= Sergey Kiselnikov =

Russian Soviet footballer (1958–2020)

Personal information
- Full name: Sergey Yuryevich Kiselnikov
- Date of birth: 19 May 1958
- Place of birth: Vologda, Russian SFSR
- Date of death: 2 December 2020 (aged 62)
- Height: 1.76 m (5 ft 9 1/2 in)
- Position: Defender

Senior career*
Years	Team	Apps	(Gls)
1976–1977	FC Dynamo Vologda	30	(1)
1977	FC Dynamo Moscow	0	(0)
1978	FC Dynamo Vologda	39	(3)
1979	FC Amur Blagoveshchensk	36	(6)
1980–1985	FC Dynamo Vologda	83	(2)
- * Club domestic league appearances and goals

Sergey Yuryevich Kiselnikov (Russian: Сергей Юрьевич Кисельников; 19 May 1958 – 2 December 2020) was a Russian Soviet football player.

== Honours ==
- 1977 FIFA World Youth Championship winner with the Soviet Union.
