= Hryhoriy Batych =

Personal information
- Full name: Hryhoriy Ivanovych Batych
- Date of birth: 8 February 1958
- Place of birth: Karaganda, Kazakh SSR
- Date of death: 24 November 2008 (aged 50)
- Place of death: Lviv, Ukraine
- Height: 1.78 m (5 ft 10 in)
- Position: Striker

Youth career
- 1969–1972: Sports school Karaganda
- 1972–1975: Sports school 4 Lviv
- 1975–1977: Karpaty Lviv

Senior career*
Years	Team	Apps	(Gls)
1977–1981	FC Karpaty Lviv	117	(26)
1982–1983	FC Nistru Kishinev	66	(30)
1984	SKA Karpaty Lvov	35	(7)
1986	FC Bukovyna Chernivtsi	39	(9)
1987	FC Zakarpattia Uzhhorod	45	(10)
1988	FC Avanhard Zhydachiv		
1989	FC Karpaty Lviv	22	(3)
1990	FC Zaria Balti	5	(0)

International career
1977	USSR youth		
Medal record
Men's football
Representing Soviet Union
FIFA U-20 World Cup
Winner	1977 Tunisia
- * Club domestic league appearances and goals

Hryhoriy Ivanovych Batych (Ukrainian: Григорій Іванович Батич, Russian: Григорий Иванович Батич, Hryhoriy Ivanovych Batych; 8 February 1958 – 24 November 2008) was a Ukrainian football midfielder and coach.

He capped for USSR youth team at 1977 FIFA World Youth Championship.

Hryhoriy Batych was born in a family of a deported Ukrainian Insurgent Army militant Ivan Batih whose name during deportation was butchered by a NKVD officials to Batich (adopted to Ukrainian as Batych). So it was left as such afterwards when the family returned to Lviv in 1972.

== Honours ==
Karpaty Lviv

- Soviet First League: 1979

Soviet Union youth

- FIFA World Youth Championship: 1977
