= Didier Billet =

French footballer (1958–2026)

Personal information
- Date of birth: 17 August 1958
- Place of birth: Fort de l'Eau, French Algeria
- Date of death: 14 September 2026 (aged 68)
- Height: 1.78 m (5 ft 10 in)
- Position: Goalkeeper

Senior career*
Years	Team	Apps	(Gls)
1968–1973	RC Agde		
1973–1975	SC Orange		
1975–1979	Olympique Marseille	23	(0)
1979–1980	Olympique Alès	33	(0)
1980–1981	FC Riedisheim		
1981–1983	Stade raphaëlois		
1983–1986	CS Alençon		
1986–1987	RD Agde		

International career
1977	France U-20	2	(0)
- * Club domestic league appearances and goals

Didier Billet (French: [didjˈe bijˈɛ]; 17 August 1958 – 14 September 2026) was a French footballer who played as a goalkeeper.

Billet started his career with RC Agde in 1968, also playing for Olympique Marseille, Olympique Alès, and CS Alençon before retiring with Agde in 1987. In international play, he appeared in two matches for the France U-20 team in the 1977 FIFA World Youth Championship.

Billet died on 14 September 2026, at the age of 68.
