= Aleksandr Novikov (footballer, born 1958) =

Soviet footballer

Personal information
- Full name: Aleksandr Nikolayevich Novikov
- Date of birth: 27 February 1958
- Date of death: 27 June 1991 (aged 33)
- Place of death: Leningrad, Russian SFSR
- Height: 1.85 m (6 ft 1 in)
- Position: Goalkeeper

Senior career*
Years	Team	Apps	(Gls)
1974–1975	FC Iskra Smolensk		
1977	PFC CSKA Moscow	0	(0)
1978–1991	FC Iskra Smolensk	303	(0)
- * Club domestic league appearances and goals

Aleksandr Nikolayevich Novikov (Russian: Александр Николаевич Новиков; born 27 February 1958; died 27 June 1991) was a Soviet football player.

== Honours ==
1977 FIFA World Youth Championship winner with the Soviet Union.

== Death ==
On 13 May 1991, the bus with his team FC Iskra Smolensk collided head-on with a truck on a highway on their way back from an away game. Team's head coach Dzhemal Silagadze died instantly, and Novikov died several weeks later in a hospital from head trauma.
