= Yuriy Syvukha =

Ukrainian footballer

Personal information
- Full name: Yuriy Petrovych Syvukha
- Date of birth: 13 January 1958 (age 68)
- Place of birth: Mala Danylivka, Kharkiv Oblast, Ukrainian SSR, Soviet Union
- Height: 1.89 m (6 ft 2 in)
- Position: Goalkeeper

Youth career
- 197?–1976: Trudovi Reservy Kharkiv

Senior career*
| Years | Team | Apps | (Gls) |
| 1976 | FC Metalist Kharkiv | 3 | (0) |
| 1977–1978 | FC Dynamo Kyiv | 1 | (0) |
| 1979–1988 | FC Metalist Kharkiv | 265 | (0) |
| 1989–1994 | FC Metalurh Zaporizhzhia | 117 | (0) |
| 1994 | FC Torpedo Zaporizhzhia | 6 | (0) |
| 1994–1995 | FC Zirka Kirovohrad | 14 | (0) |

International career
| 1975–1976 | USSR-18 | ? | (?) |
| 1977–1978 | USSR-20 | ? | (?) |

Managerial career
- 2001–2004: FC Metalist Kharkiv (assistant)
- 2005–2010: FC Kharkiv (assistant)
- 2013–2016: Ukraine (goalkeeping coach)
- 2017: FC Aktobe (goalkeeping coach)
- * Club domestic league appearances and goals

Yuriy Syvukha (Ukrainian: Юрій Петрович Сивуха; born 13 January 1958) is a former football goalkeeper and a current goalkeeping coach.

Syvukha began his coaching career as a goalkeepers coach. In January 2013 he was appointed as a goalkeeping coach in the Ukraine national football team.

== Awards and honours ==
Awards

- USSR Premier League runner-up: 1978
- USSR Cup: 1978, 1988

Individual honours

- Ukrainian Footballer of the Year: 1992, 1992–1993
