= FIFA U-20 World Cup =

- The trophy awarded since 2013
- Organiser(s): FIFA
- Founded: 1977; 49 years ago
- Region: International
- Teams: 24 (finals)
- Related competitions: FIFA U-20 Women's World Cup; FIFA U-17 World Cup
- Current champions: Morocco (1st title)
- Most championships: Argentina (6 titles)
- Website: fifa.com/u20worldcup
- 2027 FIFA U-20 World Cup

The FIFA U-20 World Cup is the biennial football world championship tournament for FIFA members' men's national teams with players up to the age of 20. The competition has been staged every two years since the inaugural tournament in 1977 when it was hosted by Tunisia under the tournament name of FIFA World Youth Championship until 2005. In 2007 the name was changed to its present form. FIFA bills the men's Under-20 World Cup as "the tournament of tomorrow's superstars." Diego Maradona, Lionel Messi and Paul Pogba are previous winners of the official player of the tournament award, and Erling Haaland was the top scorer at the 2019 edition. The reigning champions are Morocco, which won their first title at the 2025 tournament in Chile.

== History ==
In the twenty-three editions of the tournament held, twelve nations have won the title. Argentina U20 is the most successful team with six titles, followed by Brazil U20 with five titles. Portugal U20 and Serbia U20 have both won two titles (with the latter winning once as Yugoslavia U20), while Ghana U20, Germany U20, Spain U20, France U20, England U20, Ukraine U20, Russia U20 (as the USSR U20), Uruguay U20, and Morocco U20 have won the title once each.

A corresponding event for women's teams, the FIFA U-20 Women's World Cup, began in 2002 with the name "FIFA U-19 Women's World Championship" and an age limit of 19. The age limit for the women's competition was changed to 20 beginning with the 2006 FIFA U-20 Women's World Championship, and the competition was renamed as a "World Cup" in 2007 in preparation for the 2008 event. The next edition is planned to be held in 2027 in Azerbaijan and Uzbekistan.

== Qualification ==
24 national teams appear in the final tournament. 23 teams, including the defending champions, have to qualify in the youth championships of the six confederations. The team representing the host nation automatically qualifies.

Confederation	Championship
AFC (Asia)	AFC U-20 Asian Cup
CAF (Africa)	U-20 Africa Cup of Nations
CONCACAF (North, Central America and the Caribbean)	CONCACAF Under-20 Championship
CONMEBOL (South America)	CONMEBOL Sub 20
OFC (Oceania)	OFC U-19 Men's Championship
UEFA (Europe)	UEFA European Under-19 Championship

== Results ==
- 1977–2005: "FIFA World Youth Championship"
- 2007–present: "FIFA U-20 World Cup"
- a.e.t.: after extra time
- p: match won on penalties

Ed.	Year	Hosts	Final			Third place game			Num. teams
Ed.	Year	Hosts	(gold) Champions	Score	(silver) Runners-up	(bronze) Third place	Score	Fourth place	Num. teams
1	1977	Tunisia	Soviet Union	2–2 (a.e.t.) (9–8 p)	Mexico	Brazil	4–0	Uruguay	16
2	1979	Japan	Argentina	3–1	Soviet Union	Uruguay	1–1 (a.e.t.) (5–3 p)	Poland	16
3	1981	Australia	West Germany	4–0	Qatar	Romania	1–0	England	16
4	1983	Mexico	Brazil	1–0	Argentina	Poland	2–1 (a.e.t.)	South Korea	16
5	1985	Soviet Union	Brazil	1–0 (a.e.t.)	Spain	Nigeria	0–0 (a.e.t.) (3–1 p)	Soviet Union	16
6	1987	Chile	Yugoslavia	1–1 (a.e.t.) (5–4 p)	West Germany	East Germany	1–1 (a.e.t.) (3–1 p)	Chile	16
7	1989	Saudi Arabia	Portugal	2–0	Nigeria	Brazil	2–0	United States	16
8	1991	Portugal	Portugal	0–0 (a.e.t.) (4–2 p)	Brazil	Soviet Union	1–1 (a.e.t.) (5–4 p)	Australia	16
9	1993	Australia	Brazil	2–1	Ghana	England	2–1	Australia	16
10	1995	Qatar	Argentina	2–0	Brazil	Portugal	3–2	Spain	16
11	1997	Malaysia	Argentina	2–1	Uruguay	Republic of Ireland	2–1	Ghana	24
12	1999	Nigeria	Spain	4–0	Japan	Mali	1–0	Uruguay	24
13	2001	Argentina	Argentina	3–0	Ghana	Egypt	1–0	Paraguay	24
14	2003	United Arab Emirates	Brazil	1–0	Spain	Colombia	2–1	Argentina	24
15	2005	Netherlands	Argentina	2–1	Nigeria	Brazil	2–1	Morocco	24
16	2007	Canada	Argentina	2–1	Czech Republic	Chile	1–0	Austria	24
17	2009	Egypt	Ghana	0–0 (a.e.t.) (4–3 p)	Brazil	Hungary	1–1 (a.e.t.) (2–0 p)	Costa Rica	24
18	2011	Colombia	Brazil	3–2 (a.e.t.)	Portugal	Mexico	3–1	France	24
19	2013	Turkey	France	0–0 (a.e.t.) (4–1 p)	Uruguay	Ghana	3–0	Iraq	24
20	2015	New Zealand	Serbia	2–1 (a.e.t.)	Brazil	Mali	3–1	Senegal	24
21	2017	South Korea	England	1–0	Venezuela	Italy	0–0 (a.e.t.) (4–1 p)	Uruguay	24
22	2019	Poland	Ukraine	3–1	South Korea	Ecuador	1–0 (a.e.t.)	Italy	24
23	2023	Argentina	Uruguay	1–0	Italy	Israel	3–1	South Korea	24
24	2025	Chile	Morocco	2–0	Argentina	Colombia	1–0	France	24
25	2027	Azerbaijan; Uzbekistan							24
26	2029	Armenia; Georgia							24
27	2031	India							24

== Teams reaching the top four ==
Team	Title(s)	Runners-up	Third place	Fourth place
Argentina	6 (1979, 1995, 1997, 2001, 2005, 2007)	2 (1983, 2025)		1 (2003)
Brazil	5 (1983, 1985, 1993, 2003, 2011)	4 (1991, 1995, 2009, 2015)	3 (1977, 1989, 2005)	
Portugal	2 (1989, 1991)	1 (2011)	1 (1995)	
Serbia^{1}	2 (1987, 2015)			
Uruguay	1 (2023)	2 (1997, 2013)	1 (1979)	3 (1977, 1999, 2017)
Ghana	1 (2009)	2 (1993, 2001)	1 (2013)	1 (1997)
Spain	1 (1999)	2 (1985, 2003)		1 (1995)
Russia^{2}	1 (1977)	1 (1979)	1 (1991)	1 (1985)
Germany^{3}	1 (1981)	1 (1987)		
England	1 (2017)		1 (1993)	1 (1981)
France	1 (2013)			2 (2011, 2025)
Morocco	1 (2025)			1 (2005)
Ukraine	1 (2019)			
Nigeria		2 (1989, 2005)	1 (1985)	
Italy		1 (2023)	1 (2017)	1 (2019)
Mexico		1 (1977)	1 (2011)	
South Korea		1 (2019)		2 (1983, 2023)
Qatar		1 (1981)		
Japan		1 (1999)		
Czech Republic		1 (2007)		
Venezuela		1 (2017)		
Mali			2 (1999, 2015)	
Colombia			2 (2003, 2025)	
Poland			1 (1983)	1 (1979)
Chile			1 (2007)	1 (1987)
Romania			1 (1981)	
East Germany			1 (1987)	
Republic of Ireland			1 (1997)	
Egypt			1 (2001)	
Hungary			1 (2009)	
Ecuador			1 (2019)	
Israel			1 (2023)	
Australia				2 (1991, 1993)
United States				1 (1989)
Paraguay				1 (2001)
Austria				1 (2007)
Costa Rica				1 (2009)
Iraq				1 (2013)
Senegal				1 (2015)

1 = includes results representing Yugoslavia
2 = Russia inherited the records and history of the Soviet Union national football teams after the dissolution of the Soviet Union
3 = Germany inherited the records and history of the West Germany national football teams after the reunification of Germany

=== Performances by continental zones ===
Map of the best results for each country

All continental confederations except for the OFC (Oceania) have made an appearance in the final match of the tournament. To date, CONMEBOL (South America) leads with twelve titles, followed by UEFA (Europe) with ten titles and the CAF (Africa) with two titles. Teams reprensenting the AFC (Asia) have made the final three times, but were defeated by strong UEFA teams. Mexico is the only team from CONCACAF (North, Central America and the Caribbean) which has made the final. Mexico lost to the Soviet Union in the final of the inaugural tournament in 1977, which is also their only appearance in a final. No current OFC member has ever made the semi-finals; Australia reached the last four as an OFC member in 1991 and 1993, finishing fourth on both occasions, before the country joined the AFC in 2006.

Confederation (continent)	Performances			
Confederation (continent)	Winners	Runners-up	Third place	Fourth place
CONMEBOL (South America)	12 titles: Argentina (6), Brazil (5), Uruguay (1)	9 times: Brazil (4), Uruguay (2), Argentina (2), Venezuela (1)	8 times: Brazil (3), Colombia (2), Uruguay (1), Chile (1), Ecuador (1)	6 times: Uruguay (3), Chile (1), Paraguay (1), Argentina (1)
UEFA (Europe)	10 titles: Portugal (2), Serbia^{1} (2), Soviet Union (1), West Germany (1), Spain (1), France (1), England (1), Ukraine (1)	7 times: Spain (2), Soviet Union (1), West Germany (1), Czech Republic (1), Portugal (1), Italy (1)	10 times: Romania (1), Poland (1), East Germany (1), Soviet Union (1), England (1), Portugal (1), Republic of Ireland (1), Hungary (1), Italy (1), Israel (1)	8 times: France (2), Poland (1), England (1), Soviet Union (1), Spain (1), Austria (1), Italy (1)
CAF (Africa)	2 titles: Ghana (1), Morocco (1)	4 times: Ghana (2), Nigeria (2)	5 times: Mali (2), Nigeria (1), Egypt (1), Ghana (1)	3 times: Ghana (1), Morocco (1), Senegal (1)
AFC (Asia)	None	3 times: Qatar (1), Japan (1), South Korea (1)	None	3 times: South Korea (2), Iraq (1)
CONCACAF (North, Central America and the Caribbean)	None	1 time: Mexico (1)	1 time: Mexico (1)	2 times: United States (1), Costa Rica (1)
OFC (Oceania)	None	None	None	2 times: Australia^{2} (2)

1 = won one title as Yugoslavia (1987)
2 = as a member of the OFC (became a member of the AFC since 2006)

== Awards ==
The following awards are now presented:

- The Golden Ball is awarded to the most valuable player of the tournament;
- The Golden Boot is awarded to the top goalscorer of the tournament;
- The Golden Glove is awarded to the most valuable goalkeeper of the tournament;
- The FIFA Fair Play Trophy is presented to the team with the best disciplinary record in the tournament.

Tournament	Golden Ball	Golden Boot	Goals	Golden Glove	FIFA Fair Play Trophy
1977 Tunisia	(Soviet Union) Vladimir Bessonov	(Brazil) Guina	4	Not awarded	Brazil
1979 Japan	(Argentina) Diego Maradona	(Argentina) Ramón Díaz	8	Not awarded	Poland
1981 Australia	(Romania) Romulus Gabor	(Australia) Mark Koussas	4	Not awarded	Australia
1983 Mexico	(Brazil) Geovani	(Brazil) Geovani	6	Not awarded	South Korea
1985 Soviet Union	(Brazil) Paulo Silas	(Spain) Sebastián Losada	3	Not awarded	Colombia
1987 Chile	(Socialist Federal Republic of Yugoslavia) Robert Prosinečki	(West Germany) Marcel Witeczek	7	Not awarded	West Germany
1989 Saudi Arabia	(Brazil) Bismarck	(Soviet Union) Oleg Salenko	5	Not awarded	United States
1991 Portugal	(Portugal) Emílio Peixe	(Soviet Union) Sergei Sherbakov	5	Not awarded	Soviet Union
1993 Australia	(Brazil) Adriano	(Colombia) Henry Zambrano	3	Not awarded	England
1995 Qatar	(Brazil) Caio	(Spain) Joseba Etxeberria	7	Not awarded	Japan
1997 Malaysia	(Uruguay) Nicolás Olivera	(Brazil) Adaílton	10	Not awarded	Argentina
1999 Nigeria	(Mali) Seydou Keita	(Spain) Pablo Couñago	5	Not awarded	Croatia
2001 Argentina	(Argentina) Javier Saviola	(Argentina) Javier Saviola	11	Not awarded	Argentina
2003 United Arab Emirates	(United Arab Emirates) Ismail Matar	(United States) Eddie Johnson	4	Not awarded	Colombia
2005 Netherlands	(Argentina) Lionel Messi	(Argentina) Lionel Messi	6	Not awarded	Colombia
2007 Canada	(Argentina) Sergio Agüero	(Argentina) Sergio Agüero	6	Not awarded	Japan
2009 Egypt	(Ghana) Dominic Adiyiah	(Ghana) Dominic Adiyiah	8	(Costa Rica) Esteban Alvarado	Brazil
2011 Colombia	(Brazil) Henrique Almeida	(Brazil) Henrique Almeida	5	(Portugal) Mika	Nigeria
2013 Turkey	(France) Paul Pogba	(Ghana) Ebenezer Assifuah	6	(Uruguay) Guillermo de Amores	Spain
2015 New Zealand	(Mali) Adama Traoré	(Ukraine) Viktor Kovalenko	5	(Serbia) Predrag Rajković	Ukraine
2017 South Korea	(England) Dominic Solanke	(Italy) Riccardo Orsolini	5	(England) Freddie Woodman	Mexico
2019 Poland	(South Korea) Lee Kang-in	(Norway) Erling Haaland	9	(Ukraine) Andriy Lunin	Japan
2023 Argentina	(Italy) Cesare Casadei	(Italy) Cesare Casadei	7	(Italy) Sebastiano Desplanches	United States
2025 Chile	(Morocco) Othmane Maamma	(United States) Benjamin Cremaschi	5	(Argentina) Santino Barbi	United States
2027 Azerbaijan & Uzbekistan					

== See also ==
- List of association football competitions
- FIFA World Cup
- FIFA U-17 World Cup
- FIFA U-20 Women's World Cup
- FIFA U-20 World Cup records and statistics
- Toulon Tournament
- Granatkin Memorial
