= 1983 FIFA World Youth Championship squads =

FIFA championship roster

Below are the rosters for the 1983 FIFA World Youth Championship tournament in Mexico. Those marked in bold went on to earn full international caps. Age as of 2 June 1983, first day of the tournament.

== Group A ==
=== Australia ===
Head coach: (Australia) Les Scheinflug

No.	Pos.	Player	Date of birth (age)	Caps	Club
1	GK	Chris Hummel	4 May 1965 (aged 18)		(Australia) Canberra Arrows
2	DF	Ralph Maier	5 May 1964 (aged 19)		(Australia) Newcastle KB United
3	DF	**Tom McCulloch**	10 February 1964 (aged 19)		(Australia) Marconi Stallions
4	DF	Tony Dakos	9 April 1964 (aged 19)		(Australia) Sydney Olympic
5	DF	Roy Jones	20 September 1963 (aged 19)		(Australia) AIS
6	MF	Russell Stewart	27 March 1964 (aged 19)		(Australia) Brisbane Lions
7	FW	**Frank Farina**	5 September 1964 (aged 18)		(Australia) Canberra Arrows
8	MF	Jim Patikas	18 October 1963 (aged 19)		(Australia) Sydney Olympic
9	FW	Rod Brown	27 January 1964 (aged 19)		(Australia) Marconi Stallions
10	FW	David Lowe	30 August 1963 (aged 19)		(Australia) Newcastle KB United
11	MF	Fabio Incantalupo	30 December 1963 (aged 19)		(Australia) Brunswick Juventus
12	DF	Paul Daley	19 September 1964 (aged 18)		(Australia) Blacktown City
13	DF	Joe Rizzotto	11 April 1964 (aged 19)		(Australia) Marconi Stallions
14	DF	Ray Vlietstra	11 April 1964 (aged 19)		(Australia) Wollongong Wolves
15	FW	Rene Licata	28 February 1964 (aged 19)		(Australia) Marconi Stallions
16	FW	Steve Glockner	5 September 1964 (aged 18)		(Australia) Brisbane City
17	FW	Danny Wright	2 November 1964 (aged 18)		(Australia) Brisbane Lions
18	GK	**Tony Franken**	11 January 1965 (aged 18)		(Australia) AIS

=== South Korea ===
Head coach: (South Korea) Park Jong-Hwan

No.	Pos.	Player	Date of birth (age)	Caps	Club
1	GK	**Kim Poong-Joo**	1 October 1964 (aged 18)		(South Korea) Daewoo Royals
2	DF	**Kim Pan-Keun**	5 March 1966 (aged 17)		(South Korea) Korea University
3	DF	Moon Won-Keun	16 September 1963 (aged 19)		(South Korea) Dong-A University
4	DF	No In-Woo	1 September 1963 (aged 19)		(South Korea) Korea University
5	DF	**Yoo Byung-Ok**	2 March 1964 (aged 19)		(South Korea) Hanyang University
6	DF	**Jang Jung**	5 May 1964 (aged 19)		(South Korea) Ajou University
7	MF	Lee Tae-Hyung	1 September 1964 (aged 18)		(South Korea) Hanyang University
8	FW	Lee Kee-Keun	17 July 1965 (aged 17)		(South Korea) Hanyang University
9	FW	**Kim Jong-Boo**	13 January 1965 (aged 18)		(South Korea) Korea University
10	FW	**Shin Yon-Ho**	8 May 1964 (aged 19)		(South Korea) Korea University
11	FW	Lee Sung-Hee	17 August 1965 (aged 17)		(South Korea) Gangneung Agricultural High School
12	DF	Choi Ik-Hwan	23 June 1964 (aged 18)		(South Korea) Seoul FC
13	MF	Kim Heung-Kwon	2 December 1963 (aged 19)		(South Korea) Chonnam National University
14	MF	Kang Jae-Soon	15 December 1964 (aged 18)		(South Korea) Sungkyunkwan University
15	MF	**Kim Chong-Kon**	29 March 1964 (aged 19)		(South Korea) Seoul FC
16	FW	Choi Yong-Kil	15 March 1965 (aged 18)		(South Korea) Yonsei University
17	FW	Lee Hyun-Chul	14 February 1964 (aged 19)		(South Korea) Dankook University
18	GK	Lee Moon-Young	5 May 1965 (aged 18)		(South Korea) Dongbuk High School

=== Mexico ===
Head coach: (Mexico) Mario Velarde

No.	Pos.	Player	Date of birth (age)	Caps	Club
1	GK	**Nicolás Navarro**	17 September 1963 (aged 19)		(Mexico) Necaxa
2	DF	Roberto Hernández	28 September 1963 (aged 19)		(Mexico) Oaxtepec
3	DF	Horacio Macedo	15 April 1963 (aged 20)		(Mexico) Pumas UNAM
4	DF	Gerardo Quintero	18 January 1964 (aged 19)		(Mexico) Toluca
5	MF	Rodolfo Villegas	13 February 1963 (aged 20)		(Mexico) Pumas UNAM
6	MF	**Marcelino Bernal**	27 May 1962 (aged 21)		(Mexico) Coras de Tepic
7	FW	**Luis García**	4 April 1964 (aged 19)		(Mexico) Atlas
8	MF	**Miguel España**	31 January 1964 (aged 19)		(Mexico) Pumas UNAM
9	FW	Juan Muciño	23 December 1963 (aged 19)		(Mexico) Pumas UNAM
10	FW	Martín Reyna	5 December 1961 (aged 21)		(Mexico) Pumas UNAM
11	FW	**Paul Moreno**	1 September 1962 (aged 20)		(Mexico) Puebla
12	DF	**Abraham Nava**	23 January 1964 (aged 19)		(Mexico) Pumas UNAM
13	DF	Héctor Gamboa	28 August 1963 (aged 19)		(Mexico) Monterrey
14	FW	Jorge Pajarito	24 July 1964 (aged 18)		(Mexico) Atlas
15	MF	José María Huerta	18 February 1964 (aged 19)		(Mexico) Atlante F.C.
16	FW	Federico González	2 March 1965 (aged 18)		(Mexico) UAG
17	FW	Raúl Vázquez	13 December 1963 (aged 19)		(Mexico) Jalisco
18	GK	José Antonio Panduro	5 May 1963 (aged 20)		(Mexico) Jalisco

=== Scotland ===
Head coach: (Scotland) Andy Roxburgh

No.	Pos.	Player	Date of birth (age)	Caps	Club
1	GK	**Bryan Gunn**	22 December 1963 (aged 19)		(Scotland) Aberdeen
2	DF	Dave Beaumont	10 December 1963 (aged 19)		(Scotland) Dundee United
3	DF	**David Bowman**	10 March 1964 (aged 19)		(Scotland) Heart of Midlothian
4	FW	**Eric Black**	1 October 1963 (aged 19)		(Scotland) Aberdeen
5	DF	**Steve Clarke**	29 August 1963 (aged 19)		(Scotland) St Mirren
6	MF	Neale Cooper	24 November 1963 (aged 19)		(Scotland) Aberdeen
7	MF	Ally Dick	25 April 1965 (aged 18)		(England) Tottenham Hotspur
8	MF	James Dobbin	17 September 1963 (aged 19)		(Scotland) Celtic
9	FW	**Brian McClair**	8 December 1963 (aged 19)		(Scotland) Motherwell
10	DF	Gary McGinnis	21 October 1963 (aged 19)		(Scotland) Celtic
11	MF	**Jim McInally**	19 February 1964 (aged 19)		(Scotland) Celtic
12	GK	Ian Westwater	8 November 1963 (aged 19)		(Scotland) Heart of Midlothian
13	DF	**Dave McPherson**	28 January 1964 (aged 19)		(Scotland) Rangers
14	MF	**Paul McStay**	22 October 1964 (aged 18)		(Scotland) Celtic
15	MF	**Gary Mackay**	23 January 1964 (aged 19)		(Scotland) Heart of Midlothian
16	MF	**Pat Nevin**	6 September 1963 (aged 19)		(Scotland) Clyde
17	DF	John Philliben	14 March 1964 (aged 19)		(Scotland) Stirling Albion
18	MF	Brian Rice	11 October 1963 (aged 19)		(Scotland) Hibernian

== Group B ==
=== Ivory Coast ===
Head coach: (Ivory Coast) Benjamin Iojene

No.	Pos.	Player	Date of birth (age)	Caps	Club
1	GK	Lancina Doumbia	21 September 1963 (aged 19)		(Ivory Coast) Stella Club
2	DF	Léopold Didi	25 October 1963 (aged 19)		(Ivory Coast) CO Bouafle
3	DF	Gba Guedé	10 October 1964 (aged 18)		(Ivory Coast) USC Bassam
4	DF	Lohognon Soro	20 November 1963 (aged 19)		(Ivory Coast) Stella Club d'Adjamé
5	MF	Olivier Baroan	30 December 1963 (aged 19)		(Ivory Coast) Africa Sports
6	DF	Jean-Claude Boussou	18 December 1966 (aged 16)		(Ivory Coast) Stade d'Abidjan
7	DF	Alain Gbezié	22 October 1963 (aged 19)		(Ivory Coast) AS Denguele
8	FW	Léopold Sacré	1 January 1964 (aged 19)		(Ivory Coast) AS Denguele
9	FW	Aimé Tchétché	10 January 1964 (aged 19)		(Ivory Coast) Africa Sports
10	MF	Sidiki Diaby	15 August 1963 (aged 19)		(Ivory Coast) FC Hire
11	FW	Gnato Gbala	4 June 1964 (aged 18)		(Ivory Coast) Africa Sports
12	DF	Bernardin Gba	11 November 1963 (aged 19)		(Ivory Coast) USC Bassam
13	MF	Jean-Michel Kah	8 August 1966 (aged 16)		(Ivory Coast) CO Bouafle
14	FW	**Youssouf Fofana**	26 July 1966 (aged 16)		(Ivory Coast) ASEC Abidjan
15	FW	Lucien Kassy Kouadio	12 December 1963 (aged 19)		(Ivory Coast) ASEC Abidjan
16	MF	**Oumar Ben Salah**	2 July 1964 (aged 18)		(Ivory Coast) Stade d'Abidjan
17	MF	Richard Ori	3 August 1964 (aged 18)		(Ivory Coast) Stella Club
18	GK	Konan Assieoussou	1 April 1964 (aged 19)		(Ivory Coast) FC Hire

=== Poland ===
Head coach: (Poland) Mieczysław Broniszewski

No.	Pos.	Player	Date of birth (age)	Caps	Club
1	GK	**Józef Wandzik**	13 August 1963 (aged 19)		(Poland) Ruch Chorzów
2	DF	Marek Piotrowicz	20 November 1963 (aged 19)		(Poland) Górnik Zabrze
3	DF	**Witold Wenclewski**	14 April 1964 (aged 19)		(Poland) ŁKS Łódź
4	DF	Wojciech Gorgon	7 August 1963 (aged 19)		(Poland) Wisła Kraków
5	DF	Mirosław Modrzejewski	7 January 1964 (aged 19)		(Poland) Bałtyk Gdynia
6	MF	Roman Gruszecki	25 April 1964 (aged 19)		(Poland) Stal Mielec
7	MF	Mirosław Myśliński	6 December 1963 (aged 19)		(Poland) Widzew Łódź
8	MF	**Wiesław Wraga**	14 August 1964 (aged 18)		(Poland) Widzew Łódź
9	FW	Joachim Klemenz	16 February 1964 (aged 19)		(Poland) Górnik Zabrze
10	FW	Bolesław Błaszczyk	28 June 1964 (aged 18)		(Poland) Arka Gdynia
11	MF	Wiesław Krauze	23 April 1964 (aged 19)		(Poland) Bałtyk Gdynia
12	GK	**Jarosław Bako**	12 August 1964 (aged 18)		(Poland) ŁKS Łódź
13	DF	Dariusz Waśniewski	16 December 1964 (aged 18)		(Poland) Widzew Łódź
14	MF	Janusz Dobrowolski	19 August 1963 (aged 19)		(Poland) Stal Mielec
15	FW	Adrian Szczepański	30 October 1963 (aged 19)		(Poland) Gwardia Warszawa
16	MF	Rafał Stroiński	17 April 1964 (aged 19)		(Poland) Lech Poznań
17	DF	Jarosław Ludwiczak	3 February 1964 (aged 19)		(Poland) ŁKS Łódź
18	FW	**Marek Leśniak**	29 February 1964 (aged 19)		(Poland) Pogoń Szczecin

=== United States ===
Head coach: Angus McAlpine

No.	Pos.	Player	Date of birth (age)	Caps	Club
1	GK	Jeffrey Duback	5 January 1964 (aged 19)		(United States) Yale Bulldogs
2	GK	Kris Peat	30 January 1966 (aged 17)		(United States) North Carolina State
3	DF	Ralph Black	6 October 1963 (aged 19)		(United States) Baltimore Blast
4	DF	**Paul Caligiuri**	9 March 1964 (aged 19)		(United States) UCLA Bruins
5	MF	Karl Groesser	8 May 1964 (aged 19)		(United States) Colorado Comets
6	MF	Steven Maurer	18 February 1964 (aged 19)		(United States) Busch Soccer Club
7	FW	Robert Stewart	2 September 1964 (aged 18)		(United States) Alabama School
8	MF	Mark Arya	25 August 1963 (aged 19)		(United States) UC Santa Barbara Gauchos
9	MF	**Michael Brady**	1 July 1964 (aged 18)		(United States) American Eagles
10	MF	**Dale Ervine**	19 May 1964 (aged 19)		(United States) UCLA Bruins
11	MF	**Tab Ramos**	21 September 1966 (aged 16)		(United States) St. Benedict's
12	FW	**Troy Snyder**	24 November 1965 (aged 17)		(United States) Fleetwood Area High School
13	MF	Juan Forero	10 January 1965 (aged 18)		(United States) Archbishop Ryan High School
14	DF	George Gelnovatch	12 February 1965 (aged 18)		(United States) University of Virginia
15	FW	**Jeff Hooker**	21 March 1965 (aged 18)		(United States) UCLA Bruins
16	MF	**Hugo Pérez**	8 November 1963 (aged 19)		(United States) Tampa Bay Rowdies
17	MF	Derek Sanderson	14 December 1963 (aged 19)		(United States) San Jose Earthquakes
18	DF	Scott Snyder	11 February 1966 (aged 17)		(United States) Britannia Soccer Park

=== Uruguay ===
Head coach: (Uruguay) José Etchegoyen

No.	Pos.	Player	Date of birth (age)	Caps	Club
1	GK	Mario Picún	17 August 1965 (aged 17)		(Uruguay) Huracán Buceo
2	DF	Carlos Martínez	7 July 1964 (aged 18)		(Uruguay) Defensor Sporting
3	DF	Daniel Uberti	11 August 1963 (aged 19)		(Uruguay) Danubio
4	MF	Gabriel Esnal	21 August 1964 (aged 18)		(Uruguay) Wanderers
5	MF	**José Perdomo**	5 January 1965 (aged 18)		(Uruguay) Peñarol
6	MF	Fernando Silva	22 January 1964 (aged 19)		(Uruguay) River Plate
7	FW	Gerardo Miranda	30 August 1963 (aged 19)		(Uruguay) Defensor Sporting
8	MF	**José Zalazar**	26 October 1963 (aged 19)		(Uruguay) Peñarol
9	FW	**Carlos Aguilera**	21 September 1964 (aged 18)		(Uruguay) Nacional
10	MF	Jorge Martínez	22 February 1964 (aged 19)		(Uruguay) Sud América
11	FW	**Rubén Sosa**	25 April 1966 (aged 17)		(Uruguay) Danubio
12	GK	Pablo Fuentes	13 October 1963 (aged 19)		(Uruguay) Sud América
13	MF	Carlos De León	3 August 1963 (aged 19)		(Uruguay) Cerro
14	MF	Gustavo Ancheta	21 November 1963 (aged 19)		(Uruguay) Miramar Misiones
15	DF	**José Luis Saldanha**	26 October 1963 (aged 19)		(Uruguay) Nacional
16	MF	Miguel Montano	25 May 1964 (aged 19)		(Uruguay) Defensor Sporting
17	MF	Enrique Olivera	1 February 1966 (aged 17)		(Uruguay) Progreso
18	MF	Héctor Ayala	26 August 1963 (aged 19)		(Uruguay) OFI

== Group C ==
=== Argentina ===
Head coach: (Argentina) Carlos Pachamé

No.	Pos.	Player	Date of birth (age)	Caps	Club
1	GK	**Luis Islas**	22 December 1965 (aged 17)		(Argentina) Estudiantes La Plata
2	DF	**Jorge Borelli**	2 November 1964 (aged 18)		(Argentina) Platense
3	MF	Oscar Olivera	14 August 1964 (aged 18)		(Argentina) Independiente
4	DF	**Fabián Basualdo**	26 February 1964 (aged 19)		(Argentina) Newell's Old Boys
5	MF	Marco Antonio Dos Santos	1 July 1964 (aged 18)		(Argentina) Boca Juniors
6	DF	**Jorge Theiler**	12 May 1964 (aged 19)		(Argentina) Newell's Old Boys
7	FW	**Claudio García**	24 August 1963 (aged 19)		(Argentina) Huracán
8	MF	Mario Vanemerak	21 October 1963 (aged 19)		(Argentina) Vélez Sársfield
9	FW	Jorge Luis Gabrich	14 October 1963 (aged 19)		(Argentina) Instituto Córdoba
10	MF	Roberto Oscar Zárate	18 February 1964 (aged 19)		(Argentina) Newell's Old Boys
11	FW	**Oscar Dertycia**	3 March 1965 (aged 18)		(Argentina) Instituto de Córdoba
12	GK	Carlos Prono	5 October 1963 (aged 19)		(Argentina) Club Atlético Independiente
13	MF	Ariel Ramon Moreno	29 June 1965 (aged 17)		(Argentina) Talleres de Cordoba
14	FW	Alfredo Graciani	6 January 1965 (aged 18)		(Argentina) Atlanta
15	DF	Esteban Solaberrieta	26 March 1964 (aged 19)		(Argentina) Kimberley
16	FW	**Gustavo Dezotti**	14 February 1964 (aged 19)		(Argentina) Newell's Old Boys
17	MF	**Oscar Roman Acosta**	18 October 1964 (aged 18)		(Argentina) Ferro Carril Oeste
18	MF	Julio César Gaona	5 February 1964 (aged 19)		(Argentina) Platense

=== Austria ===
Head coach: (Austria) Gerhard Hitzel

No.	Pos.	Player	Date of birth (age)	Caps	Club
1	GK	**Franz Wohlfahrt**	1 July 1964 (aged 18)		Austria Wien
2	DF	Andreas Cvetko	15 December 1963 (aged 19)		Austria Klagenfurt
3	DF	**Robert Frind**	2 December 1963 (aged 19)		Austria Wien
4	DF	Josef Kleinbichler	14 December 1963 (aged 19)		(Austria) SSW Innsbruck
5	DF	Alfred Stumpfl	16 October 1963 (aged 19)		Austria Klagenfurt
6	MF	Alfred Tatar	8 August 1963 (aged 19)		(Austria) Wiener SC
7	FW	**Andreas Ogris**	7 October 1964 (aged 18)		Austria Wien
8	MF	Alois Weinrich	16 June 1964 (aged 18)		(Austria) SC Neusiedel am See
9	FW	**Toni Polster**	10 March 1964 (aged 19)		Austria Wien
10	MF	Gunter Haizinger	26 February 1964 (aged 19)		(Austria) VÖEST Linz
11	FW	**Rupert Marko**	24 November 1963 (aged 19)		(Austria) Sturm Graz
12	MF	Hannes Gort	24 September 1964 (aged 18)		(Switzerland) St. Gallen
13	MF	Gerald Rieder	30 December 1963 (aged 19)		Austria Salzburg
14	FW	Josef Hrstic	7 August 1963 (aged 19)		Austria Klagenfurt
15	FW	Michael Strobl	23 March 1964 (aged 19)		(Austria) Sturm Graz
16	MF	Michael Gabriel	15 December 1963 (aged 19)		(West Germany) Eintracht Frankfurt
17	GK	Walter Obexer	6 September 1964 (aged 18)		(Austria) SSW Innsbruck
18	MF	Bernd Walcher	4 November 1963 (aged 19)		(Austria) SC Mittersill

=== China ===
Head coach: (China) Gao Fengwen

No.	Pos.	Player	Date of birth (age)	Caps	Club
1	GK	**Fu Yubin**	29 August 1963 (aged 19)		(China) Liaoning
2	DF	Wang Wenzong	13 December 1963 (aged 19)		(China) Beijing
3	DF	**Jia Xiuquan**	9 November 1963 (aged 19)		(China) Bayi
4	MF	**Mai Chao**	21 October 1963 (aged 19)		(China) Guangzhou
5	DF	Hu Yijun	19 September 1963 (aged 19)		(China) Hubei
6	MF	Zhong Yunyue	7 November 1963 (aged 19)		(China) Bayi
7	MF	**Li Huayun**	22 September 1963 (aged 19)		(China) Liaoning
8	FW	Zhu Ping	27 October 1963 (aged 19)		(China) Sichuan
9	MF	Chen Fangping	25 September 1963 (aged 19)		(China) Bayi
10	MF	Fan Guanghui	19 September 1963 (aged 19)		(China) Liaoning
11	DF	Li Yong	5 February 1963 (aged 20)		(China) Bayi
12	FW	**Guo Yijun**	11 December 1963 (aged 19)		(China) Guangdong
13	MF	Cheng Jian	3 December 1963 (aged 19)		(China) Hunan
14	GK	Wang Jun	5 September 1963 (aged 19)		(China) Liaoning
15	FW	**Liu Haiguang**	11 September 1963 (aged 19)		(China) Shanghai
16	DF	**Duan Ju**	3 October 1963 (aged 19)		(China) Tianjin
17	DF	Shan Chunji	20 February 1964 (aged 19)		(China) Tianjin
18	GK	Li Zhigao	24 June 1964 (aged 18)		(China) Jiangsu

=== Czechoslovakia ===
Head coach: (Czechoslovakia) Milouš Kvaček

No.	Pos.	Player	Date of birth (age)	Caps	Club
1	GK	Jiří Krbeček	12 May 1964 (aged 19)		(Czechoslovakia) Škoda Plzeň
2	MF	**Ivan Hašek**	6 September 1963 (aged 19)		(Czechoslovakia) Sparta Prague
3	MF	Pavel Vrba	6 December 1963 (aged 19)		(Czechoslovakia) RH Cheb
4	DF	Eduard Kopča	30 August 1963 (aged 19)		(Czechoslovakia) Inter Bratislava
5	DF	**Aleš Bažant**	31 December 1963 (aged 19)		(Czechoslovakia) Dukla Prague
6	DF	**Luboš Kubík**	20 January 1964 (aged 19)		(Czechoslovakia) Slavia Prague
7	MF	Stanislav Dostál	7 November 1963 (aged 19)		(Czechoslovakia) Vítkovice
8	FW	Vlastimil Kula	10 August 1963 (aged 19)		(Czechoslovakia) Dukla Banská Bystrica
9	MF	Pavel Karoch	2 November 1963 (aged 19)		(Czechoslovakia) Dukla Prague
10	MF	**Karel Kula**	10 August 1963 (aged 19)		(Czechoslovakia) Dukla Banská Bystrica
11	MF	Miroslav Miškuf	20 December 1963 (aged 19)		(Czechoslovakia) FC Lokomotíva Košice
12	DF	**Peter Fieber**	16 May 1964 (aged 19)		(Czechoslovakia) Dukla Banská Bystrica
13	FW	Rostislav Halkoci	9 October 1963 (aged 19)		(Czechoslovakia) Banik Ostrava
14	MF	Miroslav Hirko	12 October 1963 (aged 19)		(Czechoslovakia) Slovan Bratislava
15	MF	Pravoslav Sukač	24 January 1964 (aged 19)		(Czechoslovakia) Baník Ostrava
16	FW	Dušan Horváth	31 October 1964 (aged 18)		(Czechoslovakia) Baník Ostrava
17	MF	Radek Zálešák	26 March 1964 (aged 19)		(Czechoslovakia) Slavia Prague
18	GK	Luboš Přibyl	16 October 1964 (aged 18)		(Czechoslovakia) VCHZ Pardubice

== Group D ==
=== Brazil ===
Head coach: Jair Pereira

No.	Pos.	Player	Date of birth (age)	Caps	Club
1	GK	Hugo	20 June 1964 (aged 18)		(Brazil) Flamengo
2	DF	Boni	8 March 1964 (aged 19)		(Brazil) São Paulo
3	DF	**Aloísio**	8 March 1964 (aged 19)		(Brazil) Internacional
4	MF	Heitor	14 February 1964 (aged 19)		(Brazil) Ponte Preta
5	MF	Coelho	28 November 1963 (aged 19)		(Brazil) Vitória
6	MF	Adalberto	3 June 1964 (aged 18)		(Brazil) Flamengo
7	FW	Maurícinho	29 December 1963 (aged 19)		(Brazil) Vasco da Gama
8	MF	**Geovani**	6 April 1964 (aged 19)		(Brazil) Vasco da Gama
9	FW	Márinho Rã	31 July 1964 (aged 18)		(Brazil) Portuguesa
10	FW	**Bebeto**	16 February 1964 (aged 19)		(Brazil) Vitória
11	FW	Paulinho Carioca	24 March 1964 (aged 19)		(Brazil) Fluminense
12	GK	Brigatti	14 March 1964 (aged 19)		(Brazil) Ponte Preta
13	DF	**Jorginho**	17 August 1964 (aged 18)		(Brazil) America-RJ
14	DF	Guto	14 May 1964 (aged 19)		(Brazil) Flamengo
15	MF	Regis	5 January 1964 (aged 19)		(Brazil) Vitória
16	MF	**Dunga**	31 October 1963 (aged 19)		(Brazil) Internacional
17	FW	Gilmar Popoca	18 February 1964 (aged 19)		(Brazil) Flamengo
18	FW	Sidney	20 August 1963 (aged 19)		(Brazil) São Paulo

=== Netherlands ===
Head coach: (Netherlands) Kees Rijvers

No.	Pos.	Player	Date of birth (age)	Caps	Club
1	GK	Rick Laurs	2 November 1963 (aged 19)		(Netherlands) FC Eindhoven
2	DF	**Adick Koot**	16 August 1963 (aged 19)		(Netherlands) PSV
3	DF	Henk Duut	14 January 1964 (aged 19)		(Netherlands) Feyenoord
4	DF	**Sonny Silooy**	31 August 1963 (aged 19)		(Netherlands) Ajax
5	DF	Tjabko Teuben	29 December 1963 (aged 19)		(Belgium) Club Brugge
6	DF	Mike Snoei	4 December 1963 (aged 19)		(Netherlands) Excelsior
7	MF	**John van 't Schip**	30 December 1963 (aged 19)		(Netherlands) Ajax
8	MF	**Gerald Vanenburg**	5 March 1964 (aged 19)		(Netherlands) Ajax
9	FW	**Marco van Basten**	31 October 1964 (aged 18)		(Netherlands) Ajax
10	MF	René Roord	15 May 1964 (aged 19)		(Netherlands) FC Twente
11	MF	**Rob de Wit**	8 September 1963 (aged 19)		(Netherlands) FC Utrecht
12	FW	Erik-Jan van den Boogaard	19 August 1964 (aged 18)		(Netherlands) PSV
13	MF	**Mario Been**	11 December 1963 (aged 19)		(Netherlands) Feyenoord
14	MF	Edwin Godee	29 September 1964 (aged 18)		(Netherlands) Ajax
15	MF	Ramon Kramer	10 January 1964 (aged 19)		(Netherlands) Vitesse Arnhem
16	GK	**Theo Snelders**	7 December 1963 (aged 19)		(Netherlands) FC Twente
17	FW	Edwin Bakker	3 September 1964 (aged 18)		(Netherlands) Ajax
18	MF	René Panhuis	26 August 1964 (aged 18)		(Netherlands) Ajax

=== Nigeria ===
Head coach: (Nigeria) Christopher Udemezue

No.	Pos.	Player	Date of birth (age)	Caps	Club
1	GK	**Wilfred Agbonavbare**	5 October 1966 (aged 16)		New Nigeria Bank
2	MF	Chibuzor Ehilegbu	30 April 1964 (aged 19)		(Nigeria) Sharks FC
3	FW	Femi Olukanni	27 November 1965 (aged 17)		(Nigeria) Plateau United
4	DF	Paul Lucky Okoku	27 December 1965 (aged 17)		(Nigeria) Calabar Rovers
5	FW	Dahiru Sadi	10 December 1965 (aged 17)		(Nigeria) Railways Lagos
6	DF	**Yisa Sofoluwe**	28 December 1967 (aged 15)		(Nigeria) Abiola Babes
7	FW	Christopher Anigala	8 October 1965 (aged 17)		(Nigeria) Bridge FC
8	DF	Ali Jeje	1 October 1964 (aged 18)		(Nigeria) Bridge FC
9	FW	Alphonsus Akhahan	8 October 1965 (aged 17)		(Nigeria) Calabar Rovers
10	MF	Dehinde Akinlotan	2 July 1965 (aged 17)		(Nigeria) Railways Lagos
11	MF	Tarila Okoronwanta	16 March 1965 (aged 18)		(Nigeria) Calabar Rovers
12	DF	Tajudeen Disu	27 December 1965 (aged 17)		(Nigeria) Plateau United
13	DF	Amaechi Otti	23 April 1965 (aged 18)		(Nigeria) Enugu Rangers
14	FW	Humphrey Edobor	12 March 1966 (aged 17)		New Nigeria Bank
15	MF	Wahab Adesina	11 November 1964 (aged 18)		(Nigeria) Abiola Babes
16	FW	Benson Edema	21 October 1965 (aged 17)		New Nigeria Bank
17	MF	Yemi Adfranjo	11 November 1964 (aged 18)		(Nigeria) Abiola Babes
18	GK	Patrick Udoh	31 October 1964 (aged 18)		(Nigeria) Sharks FC

=== Soviet Union ===
Head coach: (Soviet Union) Nikolay Kiselyov

No.	Pos.	Player	Date of birth (age)	Caps	Club
1	GK	Valeriy Palamarchuk	11 August 1963 (aged 19)		(Soviet Union) Chornomorets Odesa
2	DF	Pakhruddin Islamov	23 October 1963 (aged 19)		(Soviet Union) Pakhtakor Tashkent
3	DF	Mikhail Agapov	8 September 1963 (aged 19)		(Soviet Union) Uralmash Sverdlovsk
4	DF	Georgi Dokhia	18 September 1963 (aged 19)		(Soviet Union) Dynamo Tbilisi
5	DF	Vadim Karataev	15 January 1964 (aged 19)		(Soviet Union) Dynamo Kyiv
6	DF	**Aliaksandr Metlitskiy**	22 April 1964 (aged 19)		(Soviet Union) Dinamo Minsk
7	MF	Aleksei Yeryomenko	17 January 1964 (aged 19)		(Soviet Union) SKA Rostov-on-Don
8	MF	**Pavlo Yakovenko**	19 December 1963 (aged 19)		(Soviet Union) Dynamo Kyiv
9	MF	**Hennadiy Lytovchenko**	11 September 1963 (aged 19)		(Soviet Union) Dnipro Dnipropetrovsk
10	MF	**Ihor Petrov**	30 January 1964 (aged 19)		(Soviet Union) Shakhtar Donetsk
11	FW	**Oleh Protasov**	4 February 1964 (aged 19)		(Soviet Union) Dnipro Dnipropetrovsk
12	MF	Fanas Salimov	19 February 1964 (aged 19)		(Soviet Union) Kairat Almaty
13	DF	Vladimir Demidov	19 January 1964 (aged 19)		(Soviet Union) Dynamo Moscow
14	MF	**Gocha Tkebuchava**	24 November 1963 (aged 19)		(Soviet Union) Dynamo Moscow
15	DF	**Pavel Radnyonak**	30 July 1964 (aged 18)		(Soviet Union) Dinamo Minsk
16	GK	**Stanislav Cherchesov**	2 September 1963 (aged 19)		(Soviet Union) Spartak Ordzhonikidze
17	FW	**Sergey Dmitriev**	19 March 1964 (aged 19)		(Soviet Union) Zenit Leningrad
18	FW	Vitalis Levendrauskas	27 March 1964 (aged 19)		(Soviet Union) Žalgiris Vilnius
