= 1983 FIFA World Youth Championship =

Copa Mundial Juvenil México '83

Tournament details
- Host country: Mexico
- Dates: 2–19 June
- Teams: 16 (from 6 confederations)
- Venues: 7 (in 7 host cities)

Final positions
- Champions: Brazil (1st title)
- Runners-up: Argentina
- Third place: Poland
- Fourth place: South Korea

Tournament statistics
- Matches played: 32
- Goals scored: 91 (2.84 per match)
- Attendance: 1,155,160 (36,099 per match)
- Top scorer: (Brazil) Geovani (6 goals)
- Best player: (Brazil) Geovani
- Fair play award: South Korea

The 1983 FIFA World Youth Championship was the fourth edition FIFA World Youth Championship tournament, hosted from 2 June to 19 June 1983 in seven venues in Mexico — Guadalajara, Irapuato, León, Mexico City, Monterrey, Puebla and Toluca — where a total of 32 matches were played. Brazil U20 defeated Argentina, 1–0, at Mexico City's Azteca Stadium to claim its inaugural tournament title of five.

This edition still retains the record average daily attendance of 36,099 in the tournament's history. This test of Mexico's capacity and capability to host a major FIFA tournament was recognized in May to host the 1986 FIFA World Cup.

== Qualification ==
| Confederation | Qualifying Tournament | Qualifier(s) |
|---|---|---|
| AFC (Asia) | 1982 AFC Youth Championship | China^{1} South Korea |
| CAF (Africa) | 1983 African Youth Championship | Ivory Coast; Nigeria^{1} |
| CONCACAF (North, Central America & Caribbean) | Host nation | Mexico |
| CONCACAF (North, Central America & Caribbean) | 1982 CONCACAF U-20 Tournament | United States |
| CONMEBOL (South America) | 1983 South American Youth Championship | Argentina; Brazil; Uruguay |
| OFC (Oceania) | 1982 OFC U-20 Championship | Australia |
| UEFA (Europe) | 1982 UEFA European Under-18 Football Championship | Austria; Czechoslovakia^{1} Netherlands^{1} Poland; Scotland^{1} Soviet Union |

1.Teams that made their debut.

== Squads ==
For a list of all squads that played in the final tournament, see 1983 FIFA World Youth Championship squads.

== Group stage ==
=== Group A ===
| Pos | Team | Pld | W | D | L | GF | GA | GD | Pts | Group stage result |
|---|---|---|---|---|---|---|---|---|---|---|
| 1 | Scotland | 3 | 2 | 0 | 1 | 4 | 2 | +2 | 4 | Advance to knockout stage |
| 2 | South Korea | 3 | 2 | 0 | 1 | 4 | 4 | 0 | 4 | Advance to knockout stage |
| 3 | Australia | 3 | 1 | 1 | 1 | 4 | 4 | 0 | 3 | |
| 4 | Mexico (H) | 3 | 0 | 1 | 2 | 2 | 4 | −2 | 1 | |

(H) Hosts
2 June 1983
21:00

| Mexico | 1–1 | Australia |
|---|---|---|
| Bernal 16' | (Report) | Farina 73' |

Estadio Azteca, Mexico City
Attendance: 108,900
Referee: Gérard Biguet (France)
3 June 1983
15:00

| South Korea | 0–2 | Scotland |
|---|---|---|
| | (Report) | Dobbin 62', 78' |

Estadio Toluca 70, Toluca
Attendance: 26,191
Referee: Edward Bellion (United States)

5 June 1983
12:00

| South Korea | 2–1 | Mexico |
|---|---|---|
| No In-woo 29'; Shin Yon-ho 89' | (Report) | Reyna 10' |

Estadio Azteca, Mexico City
Attendance: 71,198
Referee: Jan Keizer (Netherlands)
5 June 1983
16:00

| Scotland | 1–2 | Australia |
|---|---|---|
| McStay 61' | (Report) | Incantalupo 52'; Patikas 87' |

Estadio Toluca 70, Toluca
Attendance: 22,111
Referee: Carlos Espósito (Argentina)

8 June 1983
16:00

| Australia | 1–2 | South Korea |
|---|---|---|
| Brown 53' | (Report) | Kim Chong-kon 16'; Kim Jong-boo 34' |

Estadio Toluca 70, Toluca
Attendance: 24,812
Referee: Horst Brummeier (Austria)
8 June 1983
20:00

| Mexico | 0–1 | Scotland |
|---|---|---|
| | (Report) | Clarke 45' |

Estadio Azteca, Mexico City
Attendance: 86,582
Referee: Luis C. Felix Ferreira (Brazil)

=== Group B ===
| Pos | Team | Pld | W | D | L | GF | GA | GD | Pts | Group stage result |
|---|---|---|---|---|---|---|---|---|---|---|
| 1 | Uruguay | 3 | 2 | 1 | 0 | 6 | 3 | +3 | 5 | Advance to knockout stage |
| 2 | Poland | 3 | 2 | 0 | 1 | 10 | 5 | +5 | 4 | Advance to knockout stage |
| 3 | United States | 3 | 1 | 0 | 2 | 3 | 5 | −2 | 2 | |
| 4 | Ivory Coast | 3 | 0 | 1 | 2 | 2 | 8 | −6 | 1 | |

3 June 1983
14:00

| Poland | 7–2 | Ivory Coast |
|---|---|---|
| Klemenz 4', 21', 51'; Gorgoń 22'; Wraga 48'; Myśliński 59'; Leśniak 85' | (Report) | Didi 67'; Kassy 80' |

Estadio Cuauhtémoc, Puebla
Attendance: 14,130
Referee: Zhang Daqiao (China)
3 June 1983
19:00

| Uruguay | 3–2 | United States |
|---|---|---|
| Aguilera 2'; Sosa 57', 64' | (Report) | Hooker 60'; Perez 67' |

Estadio Jalisco, Guadalajara
Attendance: 17,821
Referee: Ivan Gregr (Czechoslovakia)

5 June 1983
14:00

| United States | 1–0 | Ivory Coast |
|---|---|---|
| Gelnovatch 79' | (Report) |

Estadio Cuauhtémoc, Puebla
Attendance: 11,836
Referee: César Pagano (Peru)
6 June 1983
17:00

| Uruguay | 3–1 | Poland |
|---|---|---|
| Zalazar 52'; Aguilera 54', 66' | (Report) | Klemenz 57' |

Estadio León, León
Attendance: 23,117
Referee: Muhamed Larache (Morocco)

8 June 1983
14:00

| Poland | 2–0 | United States |
|---|---|---|
| Leśniak 76'; Szczepański 85' | (Report) |

Estadio Cuauhtémoc, Puebla
Attendance: 16,103
Referee: Okubule Eestus (Nigeria)
8 June 1983
15:00

| Ivory Coast | 0–0 | Uruguay |
|---|---|---|
| | (Report) |

Estadio Irapuato, Irapuato
Attendance: 15,317
Referee: Lee Do-Ha (South Korea)

=== Group C ===
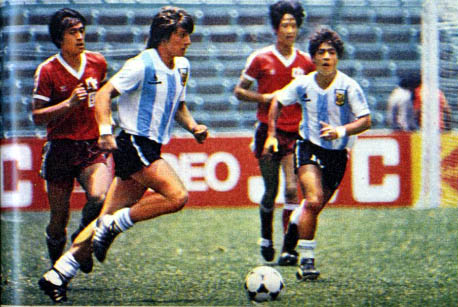
Claudio García (left) with the ball in the Argentina v China match

| Pos | Team | Pld | W | D | L | GF | GA | GD | Pts | Group stage result |
|---|---|---|---|---|---|---|---|---|---|---|
| 1 | Argentina | 3 | 3 | 0 | 0 | 10 | 0 | +10 | 6 | Advance to knockout stage |
| 2 | Czechoslovakia | 3 | 2 | 0 | 1 | 7 | 4 | +3 | 4 | Advance to knockout stage |
| 3 | China | 3 | 1 | 0 | 2 | 5 | 8 | −3 | 2 | |
| 4 | Austria | 3 | 0 | 0 | 3 | 0 | 10 | −10 | 0 | |

4 June 1983
12:00

| China | 0–5 | Argentina |
|---|---|---|
| | (Report) | Gabrich 16'; García 53'; Dertycia 70'; Zárate 81'; Acosta 89' |

Estadio Azteca, Mexico City
Attendance: 19,376
Referee: Hernán Silva Arce (Chile)
4 June 1983
12:00

| Czechoslovakia | 4–0 | Austria |
|---|---|---|
| Kula 9', 71'; Karoch 48'; Hirko 89' | (Report) |

Estadio Cuauhtémoc, Puebla
Attendance: 21,112
Referee: Romualdas Yushka (Soviet Union)

7 June 1983
15:00

| Czechoslovakia | 3–2 | China |
|---|---|---|
| Dostal 34', 89'; Kula 75' | (Report) | Mai Chao 49'; Li Huayun 56' |

Estadio Irapuato, Irapuato
Attendance: 15,317
Referee: M. Karim (Bahrain)
7 June 1983
19:00

| Austria | 0–3 | Argentina |
|---|---|---|
| | (Report) | Gabrich 13', 28'; Zárate 20' |

Estadio León, León
Attendance: 31,144
Referee: Brian R. McGinley (Scotland)

9 June 1983
15:00

| China | 3–0 | Austria |
|---|---|---|
| Liu Haiguang 48'; Guo Yijun 79'; Duan Ju 88' | (Report) |

Estadio Irapuato, Irapuato
Attendance: 15,317
Referee: Christopher Bambridge (Australia)
9 June 1983
17:00

| Argentina | 2–0 | Czechoslovakia |
|---|---|---|
| Vanemerak 15'; Gabrich 77' | (Report) |

Estadio León, León
Attendance: 14,143
Referee: Bernard Grah (Côte d'Ivoire)

=== Group D ===
| Pos | Team | Pld | W | D | L | GF | GA | GD | Pts | Group stage result |
|---|---|---|---|---|---|---|---|---|---|---|
| 1 | Brazil | 3 | 2 | 1 | 0 | 6 | 2 | +4 | 5 | Advance to knockout stage |
| 2 | Netherlands | 3 | 1 | 2 | 0 | 4 | 3 | +1 | 4 | Advance to knockout stage |
| 3 | Nigeria | 3 | 1 | 1 | 1 | 1 | 3 | −2 | 3 | |
| 4 | Soviet Union | 3 | 0 | 0 | 3 | 3 | 6 | −3 | 0 | |

4 June 1983
14:00

| Soviet Union | 0–1 | Nigeria |
|---|---|---|
| | (Report) | Okoronwanta 78' |

Estadio Universitario, San Nicolás de los Garza
Attendance: 37,837
Referee: Fermín Ramírez Zermeno (Mexico)
4 June 1983
19:00

| Netherlands | 1–1 | Brazil |
|---|---|---|
| Been 49' | (Report) | Geovani 77' |

Estadio Jalisco, Guadalajara
Attendance: 68,130
Referee: Rolf Ericson (Sweden)

6 June 1983
19:00

| Brazil | 3–0 | Nigeria |
|---|---|---|
| Gilmar Popoca 7'; Ra 32'; Geovani 43' | (Report) |

Estadio Jalisco, Guadalajara
Attendance: 41,182
Referee: Carlos Luis Alfaro (Costa Rica)
6 June 1983
21:00

| Netherlands | 3–2 | Soviet Union |
|---|---|---|
| Duut 12'; Been 48'; Van Basten 49' | (Report) | Salimov 40'; Protasov 46' |

Estadio Universitario, San Nicolás de los Garza
Attendance: 27,136
Referee: José Luis Martínez Bazán (Uruguay)

9 June 1983
19:00

| Soviet Union | 1–2 | Brazil |
|---|---|---|
| Litovchenko 87' | (Report) | Agapov 47' (o.g.); Geovani 80' |

Estadio Jalisco, Guadalajara
Attendance: 31,380
Referee: Keith Hackett (England)
9 June 1983
21:00

| Nigeria | 0–0 | Netherlands |
|---|---|---|
| | (Report) |

Estadio Universitario, San Nicolás de los Garza
Attendance: 41,283
Referee: Andrzej Libich (Poland)

== Knockout stage ==
Quarter-finals
11 June - Mexico City
Scotland | 0
Poland | 1
12 June - León
Argentina | 2
Netherlands | 1
11 June - San Nicolás de los Garza
Uruguay | 1
South Korea (a.e.t.) | 2
12 June - Guadalajara
Brazil | 4
Czechoslovakia | 1

Semi-finals
15 June - Mexico City
Poland | 0
Argentina | 1
15 June - San Nicolás de los Garza
South Korea | 1
Brazil | 2

Final
19 June - Mexico City
Argentina | 0
Brazil | 1
Third place
18 June - Guadalajara
Poland (a.e.t.) | 2
South Korea | 1

=== Quarter-finals ===
11 June 1983
12:00

| Scotland | 0–1 | Poland |
|---|---|---|
| | (Report) | Klemenz 5' |

Estadio Azteca, Mexico City
Attendance: 11,986
Referee: Gérard Biguet (France)

11 June 1983
17:00

| Uruguay | 1–2 (a.e.t.) | South Korea |
|---|---|---|
| Martínez 71' | (Report) | Shin Yon-ho 54', 104' |

Estadio Universitario, San Nicolás de los Garza
Attendance: 39,876
Referee: Carlos Luis Alfaro (Costa Rica)

12 June 1983
12:00

| Argentina | 2–1 | Netherlands |
|---|---|---|
| Borelli 65'; Gaona 90' | (Report) | Van Basten 4' |

Estadio León, León
Attendance: 24,830
Referee: Keith Hackett (England)

12 June 1983
12:00

| Brazil | 4–1 | Czechoslovakia |
|---|---|---|
| Dunga 18'; Bebeto 29'; Geovani 40', 60' | (Report) | Dostal 6' |

Estadio Jalisco, Guadalajara
Attendance: 36,183
Referee: Fermín Ramírez Zermeno (Mexico)

=== Semi-finals ===
15 June 1983
17:00

| Poland | 0–1 | Argentina |
|---|---|---|
| | (Report) | Zárate 59' |

Estadio Azteca, Mexico City
Attendance: 39,896
Referee: José Luis Martínez Bazán (Uruguay)

15 June 1983
17:00

| South Korea | 1–2 | Brazil |
|---|---|---|
| Kim Jong-Boo 14' | (Report) | Gilmar Popoca 22'; Ra 81' |

Estadio Universitario, San Nicolás de los Garza
Attendance: 55,914
Referee: Jan Keizer (Netherlands)

=== Third place play-off ===
18 June 1983
17:00

| Poland | 2–1 (a.e.t.) | South Korea |
|---|---|---|
| Krauze 77'; Szczepański 103' | (Report) | Lee Kee-keun 37' |

Estadio Jalisco, Guadalajara
Attendance: 35,000
Referee: Luis C. Felix Ferreira (Brazil)

=== Final ===
19 June 1983
12:00

| Argentina | 0–1 | Brazil |
|---|---|---|
| | (Report) | Geovani 39' (pen.) |

Estadio Azteca, Mexico City
Attendance: 110,000
Referee: Gérard Biguet (France)

== Result ==
FIFA World Youth Championship 1983 winners

Brazil
First title

== Awards ==
| Golden Ball | Golden Shoe | Fair Play Award |
|---|---|---|
| (Brazil) Geovani Faria da Silva | (Brazil) Geovani Faria da Silva | South Korea |

All-Star XI

- Goalkeeper: (Argentina) Luis Islas
- Sweeper: (Scotland) Neale Cooper
- Left defender: (South Korea) Kim Pan-keun
- Central defender: (Scotland) Paul McStay
- Right defender: (Argentina) Fabián Basualdo
- Left midfielder: (Argentina) Roberto Oscar Zárate
- Central midfielder: (Netherlands) Gerald Vanenburg
- Right midfielder: (Brazil) Geovani Faria da Silva
- Left forward: (Mexico) Paul Moreno
- Central forward: (Brazil) Bebeto
- Right forward: (Brazil) Mauricinho

== Goalscorers ==
Geovani of Brazil won the Golden Boot award for scoring six goals. In total, 91 goals were scored by 61 different players, with only one of them credited as own goals.

6 goals

- (Brazil) Geovani

5 goals

- (Poland) Joachim Klemenz

4 goals

- (Argentina) Jorge Luis Gabrich

3 goals

- (Argentina) Roberto Oscar Zárate
- (Czechoslovakia) Stanislav Dostal
- (South Korea) Shin Yon-ho
- (Uruguay) Carlos Aguilera

2 goals

- (Brazil) Gilmar Popoca
- (Brazil) Marinho Ra
- (Czechoslovakia) Vlastimil Kula
- (Netherlands) Marco van Basten
- (Netherlands) Mario Been
- (Poland) Adrian Szczepański
- (Poland) Marek Leśniak
- (Scotland) Jim Dobbin
- (South Korea) Kim Jong-boo
- (Uruguay) Rubén Sosa

1 goal

- (Argentina) Claudio García
- (Argentina) Jorge Borelli
- (Argentina) Julio César Gaona
- (Argentina) Mario Vanemerak
- (Argentina) Oscar Acosta
- (Argentina) Oscar Dertycia
- (Australia) Fabio Incantalupo
- (Australia) Frank Farina
- (Australia) Jim Patikas
- (Australia) Rodney Brown
- (Brazil) Bebeto
- (Brazil) Dunga
- (China) Duan Ju
- (China) Guo Yijun
- (China) Li Huayun
- (China) Liu Haiguang
- (China) Mai Chao
- (Czechoslovakia) Karel Kula
- (Czechoslovakia) Miroslav Hirko
- (Czechoslovakia) Pavel Karoch
- (Ivory Coast) Leopold Didi
- (Ivory Coast) Lucien Kassy
- (Mexico) Marcelino Bernal
- (Mexico) Martin Reyna
- (Netherlands) Henk Duut
- (Nigeria) Tarila Okoronwanta
- (Poland) Mirosław Myśliński
- (Poland) Wiesław Krauze
- (Poland) Wiesław Wraga
- (Poland) Wojciech Gorgoń
- (Scotland) Paul McStay
- (Scotland) Steve Clarke
- (South Korea) Kim Chong-kon
- (South Korea) Lee Kee-keun
- (South Korea) No In-woo
- (Soviet Union) Fanas Salimov
- (Soviet Union) Hennadiy Litovchenko
- (Soviet Union) Oleh Protasov
- (United States) George Gelnovatch
- (United States) Hugo Pérez
- (United States) Jeff Hooker
- (Uruguay) Jorge Martínez
- (Uruguay) José Zalazar

Own goals

- (Soviet Union) Mikhail Agapov (playing against Brazil)

== Final ranking ==
| Pos | Team | Pld | W | D | L | GF | GA | GD | Pts | Final result |
|---|---|---|---|---|---|---|---|---|---|---|
| 1 | Brazil | 6 | 5 | 1 | 0 | 13 | 4 | +9 | 11 | Champions |
| 2 | Argentina | 6 | 5 | 0 | 1 | 13 | 2 | +11 | 10 | Runners-up |
| 3 | Poland | 6 | 4 | 0 | 2 | 13 | 7 | +6 | 8 | Third place |
| 4 | South Korea | 6 | 3 | 0 | 3 | 8 | 9 | −1 | 6 | Fourth place |
| 5 | Uruguay | 4 | 2 | 1 | 1 | 7 | 5 | +2 | 5 | Eliminated in Quarter-finals |
| 6 | Scotland | 4 | 2 | 0 | 2 | 4 | 3 | +1 | 4 | Eliminated in Quarter-finals |
| 7 | Czechoslovakia | 4 | 2 | 0 | 2 | 8 | 8 | 0 | 4 | Eliminated in Quarter-finals |
| 8 | Netherlands | 4 | 1 | 2 | 1 | 5 | 5 | 0 | 4 | Eliminated in Quarter-finals |
| 9 | Australia | 3 | 1 | 1 | 1 | 4 | 4 | 0 | 3 | Eliminated in Group stage |
| 10 | Nigeria | 3 | 1 | 1 | 1 | 1 | 3 | −2 | 3 | Eliminated in Group stage |
| 11 | United States | 3 | 1 | 0 | 2 | 3 | 5 | −2 | 2 | Eliminated in Group stage |
| 12 | China | 3 | 1 | 0 | 2 | 5 | 8 | −3 | 2 | Eliminated in Group stage |
| 13 | Mexico (H) | 3 | 0 | 1 | 2 | 2 | 4 | −2 | 1 | Eliminated in Group stage |
| 14 | Ivory Coast | 3 | 0 | 1 | 2 | 2 | 8 | −6 | 1 | Eliminated in Group stage |
| 15 | Soviet Union | 3 | 0 | 0 | 3 | 3 | 6 | −3 | 0 | Eliminated in Group stage |
| 16 | Austria | 3 | 0 | 0 | 3 | 0 | 10 | −10 | 0 | Eliminated in Group stage |

Source: rsssf.com
(H) Hosts
