= 1982 UEFA European Under-18 Championship squads =

Player listings in youth football competition

Players in bold have later been capped at full international level.

== Group A ==
=== Austria ===
Head coach:

=== West Germany ===
Head coach: Dietrich Weise

No.	Pos.	Player	Date of birth (age)	Caps	Goals	Club
	GK	**Raimond Aumann**	12 October 1963 (aged 18)	3	0	(German Football Association) FC Bayern München
	DF	Heiko Ernst	18 August 1963 (aged 18)	3	0	(German Football Association) Eintracht Frankfurt
	DF	Jörg Horn	6 May 1964 (aged 18)	3	0	(German Football Association) Borussia Dortmund
	DF	Günther Hutwelker	15 April 1964 (aged 18)	2	0	(German Football Association) 1. FC Köln
	DF	Mike Kahlhofen	11 October 1963 (aged 18)	3	0	(German Football Association) Eintracht Frankfurt
	DF	Ulf Metschies	22 September 1963 (aged 18)	3	0	(German Football Association) VfL Osnabrück
	DF	Peter Rinner	13 September 1963 (aged 18)	1	0	(German Football Association) 1. FC Kaiserslautern
	MF	Egon Flad	5 March 1964 (aged 18)	3	1	(German Football Association) VfB Stuttgart
	MF	Uwe Haas	26 February 1964 (aged 18)	3	1	(German Football Association) 1. FC Saarbrücken
	MF	Dieter Kitzmann	11 July 1964 (aged 17)	3	0	(German Football Association) 1. FC Kaiserslautern
	MF	Roland Pohl	21 September 1963 (aged 18)	2	0	(German Football Association) VfL Bochum
	FW	Lars Beike	5 November 1963 (aged 18)	2	0	(German Football Association) Hannover 96
	FW	Uwe Bialon	30 August 1963 (aged 18)	3	0	(German Football Association) VfB Stuttgart
	FW	Gerd Dais	11 August 1963 (aged 18)	3	0	(German Football Association) VfR Mannheim
	FW	Jürgen Rinke	10 September 1963 (aged 18)	1	0	(German Football Association) Blau-Weiß 90 Berlin

=== Republic of Ireland ===
Head coach:

=== Soviet Union ===
Head coach:

== Group B ==
=== Belgium ===
Head coach:

=== Bulgaria ===
Head coach:

=== Poland ===
Head coach: (Poland) Henryk Apostel

No.	Pos.	Player	Date of birth (age)	Caps	Goals	Club
	GK	**Józef Wandzik**	13 August 1963 (aged 18)			(Polish Football Association) Ruch Chorzów
	GK	Mirosław Dygas	14 June 1964 (aged 17)			(Polish Football Association) Pogoń Szczecin
	DF	Marek Piotrowicz	20 November 1963 (aged 18)			(Polish Football Association) Górnik Zabrze
	DF	Dariusz Waśniewski	16 December 1964 (aged 17)			(Polish Football Association) Nogat Malbork
	DF	Mirosław Kuniczuk	10 October 1963 (aged 18)			(Polish Football Association) Gryf Słupsk
	DF	Mirosław Modrzejewski	7 January 1964 (aged 18)			(Polish Football Association) Zawisza Bydgoszcz
	DF	Rafał Stroiński	17 June 1964 (aged 17)			(Polish Football Association) Lech Poznań
	DF	Andrzej Marchel	16 March 1964 (aged 18)			(Polish Football Association) Lechia Gdańsk
	MF	Joachim Klemenz	16 February 1964 (aged 18)			(Polish Football Association) Górnik Zabrze
	MF	Roman Gruszecki	27 July 1964 (aged 17)			(Polish Football Association) Stal Mielec
	MF	**Wiesław Wraga**	14 August 1963 (aged 18)			(Polish Football Association) Błękitni Stargard Szczeciński
	MF	Jakub Nowak	20 September 1963 (aged 18)			(Polish Football Association) Zagłębie Sosnowiec
	MF	**Witold Wenclewski**	14 April 1964 (aged 18)			(Polish Football Association) ŁKS Łódź
	FW	Janusz Dobrowolski	19 August 1963 (aged 18)			(Polish Football Association) Stal Mielec
	FW	Mirosław Myśliński	6 December 1963 (aged 18)			(Polish Football Association) Siarka Tarnobrzeg
	FW	Mariusz Modracki	3 October 1963 (aged 18)			(Polish Football Association) Zawisza Bydgoszcz

=== Spain ===
Head coach:

== Group C ==
=== Czechoslovakia ===
Head coach:

=== Finland ===
Head coach:

=== Portugal ===
Head coach: José Augusto

No.	Pos.	Player	Date of birth (age)	Caps	Goals	Club
	GK	Diamantino Ferreira	19 December 1963 (aged 18)			(Portuguese Football Federation) Sanjoanense
	GK	Guimarães	8 December 1963 (aged 18)			(Portuguese Football Federation) Torralta
	DF	**Pedro Venâncio**	21 November 1963 (aged 18)			(Portuguese Football Federation) Sporting
	DF	Mário Paz	15 December 1963 (aged 18)			(Portuguese Football Federation) Belenenses
	DF	Faustino	16 November 1963 (aged 18)			(Portuguese Football Federation) Vitória de Setúbal
	DF	Décio	30 January 1965 (aged 17)			(Portuguese Football Federation) Torralta
	DF	Carlos Brito	21 September 1963 (aged 18)			(Portuguese Football Federation) Boavista
	DF	Paulo Nunes	20 March 1964 (aged 18)			(Portuguese Football Federation) Portimonense
	MF	António Vieira	13 December 1963 (aged 18)			(Portuguese Football Federation)
	MF	**António Morato**	6 November 1966 (aged 15)			(Portuguese Football Federation) Sporting
	MF	José Madureira	28 November 1963 (aged 18)			(Portuguese Football Federation) FC Porto
	FW	**Paulo Futre**	28 February 1966 (aged 16)			(Portuguese Football Federation) Sporting
	FW	**Jaime Mercês**	27 September 1963 (aged 18)			(Portuguese Football Federation) Amora
	FW	Jorge Silva	3 March 1964 (aged 18)			(Portuguese Football Federation) Belenenses
	FW	Alfredo Barrocal	7 November 1964 (aged 17)			(Portuguese Football Federation) Torralta
	FW	Carlos Ferreira	16 November 1963 (aged 18)			(Portuguese Football Federation) Benfica

=== Hungary ===
Head coach:

== Group D ==
=== Albania ===
Head coach: (Albania) Bahri Ishka

The following players participated in the tournament.

No.	Pos.	Player	Date of birth (age)	Caps	Goals	Club
	GK	**Halim Mersini**	22 September 1961 (aged 20)	3	0	(Albanian Football Federation) Shkëndija Tiranë
	DF	**Hysen Zmijani**	29 April 1963 (aged 19)	3	0	(Albanian Football Federation) Vllaznia Shkodër
	DF	**Adnan Oçelli**	6 August 1963 (aged 18)	3	0	(Albanian Football Federation) Partizani Tirana
	DF	**Skënder Gega**	14 November 1963 (aged 18)	2	0	(Albanian Football Federation) Shkëndija Tiranë
	DF	**Josif Gjergji**	13 April 1965 (aged 17)	1	0	(Albanian Football Federation) Shkëndija Tiranë
	DF	Koshta		1	0	(Albanian Football Federation)
	MF	**Sulejman Demollari**	15 May 1964 (aged 18)	3	0	(Albanian Football Federation) Dinamo Tirana
	MF	**Mirel Josa**	1 June 1963 (aged 18)	3	1	(Albanian Football Federation) 17 Nëntori Tirana
	MF	**Artur Lekbello**	23 February 1966 (aged 16)	3	0	(Albanian Football Federation) 17 Nëntori Tirana
	MF	Eduard Zhupa	4 August 1964 (aged 17)	3	0	(Albanian Football Federation) Shkëndija Tiranë
	MF	Isak Pashaj	25 March 1964 (aged 18)	2	0	(Albanian Football Federation) Vllaznia Shkodër
	FW	**Sokol Kushta**	17 April 1964 (aged 18)	3	1	(Albanian Football Federation) Flamurtari Vlorë
	FW	Gilbert Rrapo		3	0	(Albanian Football Federation) Skënderbeu Korçë
	FW	Sadedin Raxhimi		2	0	(Albanian Football Federation) Dinamo Tirana
	FW	Barci		1	0	(Albanian Football Federation)

=== Netherlands ===
Head coach:

=== Scotland ===
Head coach: Andy Roxburgh Assis: Walter Smith

No.	Pos.	Player	Date of birth (age)	Caps	Goals	Club
	GK	Robin Rae	18 January 1964 (aged 18)			(Scottish Football Association) Hibernian
	GK	Ian Westwater	8 November 1963 (aged 18)			(Scottish Football Association) Heart of Midlothian
	DF	Dave Beaumont	10 December 1963 (aged 18)			(Scottish Football Association) Dundee United
	DF	**Jim McInally**	19 February 1964 (aged 18)			(Scottish Football Association) Celtic
	DF	John Philliben	14 March 1964 (aged 18)			(Scottish Football Association) Stirling Albion
	DF	David Rennie	29 August 1964 (aged 17)			(The Football Association) Leicester City
	DF	Gary McGinnis	21 October 1963 (aged 18)			(Scottish Football Association) Dundee United
	MF	**Dave Bowman**	10 March 1964 (aged 18)			(Scottish Football Association) Heart of Midlothian
	MF	Brian Rice	11 October 1963 (aged 18)			(Scottish Football Association) Hibernian
	MF	**Paul McStay**	22 October 1964 (aged 17)			(Scottish Football Association) Celtic
	MF	**Gary Mackay**	23 January 1964 (aged 18)			(Scottish Football Association) Heart of Midlothian
	MF	Ally Dick	25 April 1965 (aged 17)			(The Football Association) Tottenham Hotspur
	MF	Jim Dobbin	17 September 1963 (aged 18)			(Scottish Football Association) Celtic
	FW	**Pat Nevin**	6 September 1963 (aged 18)			(Scottish Football Association) Clyde
	FW	Billy Livingstone	13 August 1964 (aged 17)			(The Football Association) Wolverhampton Wanderers
	FW	Sam McGivern	9 October 1963 (aged 18)			(Scottish Football Association) Kilmarnock

=== Turkey ===
Head coach:
