= Vanemerak =

Vanemerak is a surname. Notable people with the surname include:

- Mario Vanemerak (born 1963), Argentine footballer and manager
- Oscar Vanemerak (born 1989), Argentine footballer
