= Argentina national under-20 football team =

National under-20 football team of Argentina

Argentina U-20
- Nickname(s): Albiceleste (The White and Sky Blue); Los Cebollitas (Little Onions); Los Pibes (The Kids)
- Association: Asociación del Fútbol Argentino (Argentine Football Association)
- Confederation: CONMEBOL (South American Football Confederation)
- Head coach: Diego Placente
- Captain: Claudio Echeverri
- FIFA code: ARG
First colours	Second colours

First international
- Argentina 5–0 Venezuela (Buenos Aires, Argentina; 27 February 1951)

Biggest win
- Argentina 8–1 United States (São Paulo, Brazil; 4 May 1963)

Biggest defeat
- Uruguay 5–1 Argentina (Quito, Ecuador; March 8, 1981); Brazil 4–0 Argentina (Quito, Ecuador; March 5, 1981)

FIFA U-20 World Cup
- Appearances: 18 (first in 1979)
- Best result: Champions (1979, 1995, 1997, 2001, 2005, 2007)

CONMEBOL Sub 20
- Appearances: 29 (first in 1958)
- Best result: Champions (1967, 1997, 1999, 2003, 2015)
Medal record
FIFA U-20 World Cup
Gold medal – first place	1979 Japan	Team
Gold medal – first place	1995 Qatar	Team
Gold medal – first place	1997 Malaysia	Team
Gold medal – first place	2001 Argentina	Team
Gold medal – first place	2005 Netherlands	Team
Gold medal – first place	2007 Canada	Team
Silver medal – second place	1983 Mexico	Team
Silver medal – second place	2025 Chile	Team
- Website: afa.com.ar/selecciones

The Argentina national under-20 football team is the representative of Argentina in FIFA-sponsored tournaments that pertain to that age level.

Argentina is the most successful nation in the FIFA U-20 World Cup, winning the competition a record six times. The team has participated in 18 of the 24 World Championship events, since the 1979 edition, which they won. Argentina has also won five South American Youth Championships.

Many of Argentina's top players came through the ranks of the youth teams, including Sergio Agüero, Pablo Aimar, Nicolás Burdisso, Esteban Cambiasso, Ángel Di María, Ramón Díaz, Fernando Gago, Diego Maradona, Jorge Burruchaga, Javier Mascherano, Lionel Messi, Juan Román Riquelme, Oscar Ruggeri, Gabriel Calderón, Sergio Goycochea, Sergio Romero, Maxi Rodríguez, Luis Islas, Luciano Galletti, Juan Pablo Sorín, Franco Costanzo, Walter Samuel, Javier Saviola, Jorge Borelli, Leonardo Biagini, Diego Simeone, Carlos Tevez, Erik Lamela, Éver Banega, Manuel Lanzini, and Pablo Piatti.

== History ==
=== 1979: The first world title ===
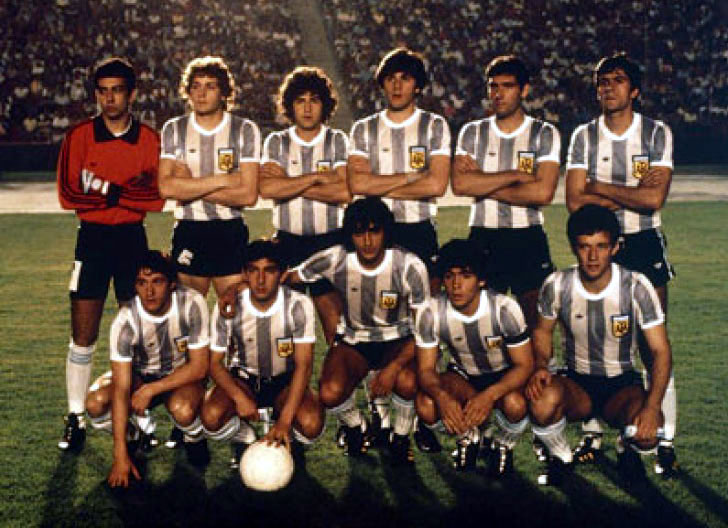
The Argentine team that won the 1979 World Youth Championship

Argentina did not participate in the first FIFA World Youth Championship in Tunisia, but appeared at the next edition held in Japan. The team, coached by César Luis Menotti with the help of Ernesto Duchini (who had previously chosen the players and worked with them), won the tournament, showing a fine style of play consisting of high possession of the ball, diverse passing, dribbling, a solid defense and a powerful offensive line that scored a total of 20 goals in the tournament. Diego Maradona and Ramón Díaz were the team's most notable players. The tournament was also the first official championship played by Maradona for the national team. After his frustration of 1978, Maradona made the most of his performances during the tournament, being the best player of the team due to his passing moves, dribbling, accuracy with free kicks and the six goals he scored.

Before every match, Diego played with the ball, putting it on his neck or his shoulders while the Japanese people couldn't stop applauding him. When I would see this, I would say to myself: "Wow, and the show hasn't even started yet".

— Osvaldo Rinaldi, remembering his teammate Maradona's performance at the 1979 FIFA World Youth Championship

Argentina debuted in Group B, thrashing Indonesia 5–0 in their first match, beating Yugoslavia 1–0 in the second and defeating Poland in the third match, 4–1. The youth squad finished first in the group with ten goals scored and only one conceded. En route to the final, Argentina hammered Algeria 5–0, then defeated arch-rival Uruguay 2–0. In the final against the Soviet Union on 7 September, the team won 3–1, becoming the World Youth Champions for the first time. Ramón Díaz won the Golden Shoe as the topscorer, with eight goals, while Maradona was awarded the Golden Ball as best player of the tournament.

Apart from Maradona and Díaz, other notable players of the team were Juan Simón, Hugo Alves, Gabriel Calderón, Juan Barbas and Osvaldo Escudero. That team is still regarded as one of the best Argentine national squads ever.

=== 1981–91: The dark decade ===
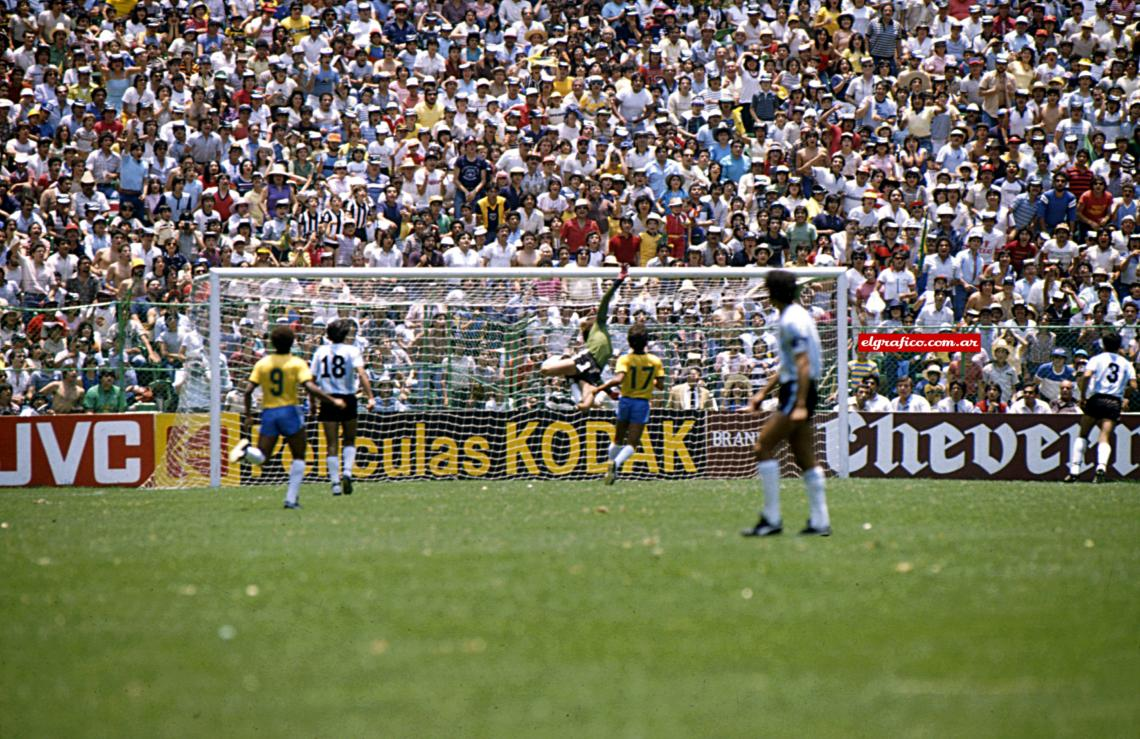
Argentina playing against Brazil in the 1983 World Cup final, where they lost 1–0

Argentina attended the next tournament, hosted by Australia in 1981. They were defeated 2–1 by hosts Australia, then achieved a draw with England (1–1) and beat Cameroon 1–0. Argentina did not qualify to the next stage, however, earning only three points after three matches played.

The team made a much better performance at the 1983 championship in Mexico, reaching the final with Brazil. On the first round, Argentina thrashed China PR 5–0, then defeated Austria 3–0 and beat Czechoslovakia 2–0. The team finished first in the group with zero goals conceded. In the quarter-finals, Argentina defeated Netherlands 2–1 (after Marco van Basten had opened the scored for the Oranje) and Poland 1–0 in the semi-finals. On 19 June 1983, Argentina played the final against Brazil, falling 1–0 at the Estadio Azteca. The team was coached by Carlos Pachamé, designated by the Senior team coach, Carlos Bilardo, to work with youth players.

Some of the players of that team were goalkeeper Luis Islas, defenders Fabián Basualdo, Jorge Theiler, Carlos Enrique; midfielders Mario Vanemerak, Oscar Acosta and Roberto Zárate; and forwards Claudio García, Jorge Luis Gabrich and Oscar Dertycia.

Argentina did not qualify for the 1985 and 1987 championships (played in the Soviet Union and Chile respectively), but the team participated in the tournament held in Saudi Arabia as one of the three qualified in the South American championship. Argentina was defeated by Spain in the first match. The team recovered winning the second game to Norway 2–0, but although it lost the last match to Iraq, Argentina qualified for the second round. In the knockout stage, the team was beaten 1–0 by Brazil.

For the 1991 championship held in Portugal, Argentina was coached by Reinaldo Merlo, who was designated by then-senior coach Alfio Basile as it had been in the precedent era.

Argentina made its worst campaign in youth tournaments, finishing last in their group with only one point earned from three matches. The team lost to Korea united team 1–0 in the first match, then were defeated by hosts Portugal 3–0 in a match where three Argentine players (Claudio París, Mauricio Pellegrino and Juan Esnáider) were sent off for their rough play which culminated in a brawl on the pitch between both teams. As a result, FIFA punished the Argentina Football Association (AFA) with a two-year suspension, as well as a one-year suspension for Esnáider and a two-year suspension for Norberto Recassens (one of the representatives of the AFA), both of whom insulted the referees in their dressing room at the end of the match.

Some of the players that took part of that team were goalkeeper Leonardo Díaz, defenders Diego Cocca, Mauricio Pochettino and Pellegrino; midfielders París, Walter Paz Hugo Morales and Christian Bassedas; and forwards Marcelo Delgado and Esnáider.

=== Pékerman era: the golden years ===
Because it was banned, Argentina did not participate in the 1993 World Cup in Australia. The Argentina Football Association (AFA) had opted to name a new coach entirely independent from the senior team coach as had been until then. Selected was José Pékerman, who, despite not having much previous experience, convinced the AFA to hire him.

The good results were immediate: Argentina won the first World Cup contested with Pékerman as coach, held in 1995 in Qatar. In the first stage, Argentina defeated the Netherlands 1–0, then lost to Portugal 1–0 followed by a 4–2 win over Honduras, securing a second-place finish and progression to the quarter-finals, where they thrashed Cameroon by 4–0. In semi-finals, Argentina beat Spain 3–0 then defeated Brazil 2–0 in the final, exacting revenge from the 1983 tournament where the Brazilians won.

Some of its most notable players were Juan Pablo Sorín, Joaquín Irigoytía, Federico Domínguez, Mariano Juan, Ariel Ibagaza, Leonardo Biagini and Walter Coyette.

Argentina won its third title at the 1997 championship, hosted by Malaysia. The team defeated Hungary 3–0 and Canada 2–1, but lost to Australia 4–3. Argentina passed to the round of 16 where they defeated England 2–1. In quarter-finals, Argentina eliminated Brazil after winning 2–0, then beat the Republic of Ireland 1–0 in the semi-finals. In the final match, played on 5 July 1997, the squad defeated Uruguay 2–1 to win its third championship. The team also received the FIFA Fair Play Award in recognition to the good behaviour showed on the field.

Argentina showed the talent of notable players such as Leonardo Franco, Fabián Cubero, Leandro Cufré, Walter Samuel, Diego Placente, Esteban Cambiasso, Pablo Aimar, Juan Román Riquelme and Bernardo Romeo, many of them with already many matched played in the Primera División when the tournament began.

The performance during the 1999 World Championship in Nigeria was not so good. Argentina finished 3rd of 4 in the group, winning over Kazakhstan 1–0 at the debut but with a game lost to Ghana (1-0) and a 0–0 draw with Croatia. On the round of 16, Argentina was largely defeated at the hands Mexico by 4-1 and eliminated from the tournament.

In 2001 Argentina hosted its first Youth Championship. The team won its fourth title, the third championship in seven years. Argentina debuted in the José Amalfitani Stadium (the venue where the team played all its games in Buenos Aires) defeating Finland 1–0. The next game Argentina thrashed Egypt 7–1 (with three goals by Javier Saviola), and closed its participation in Group A by smashing Jamaica by 5–1. In the knockout round, Argentina successively eliminated China (2–1), France (3–1) and Paraguay (5–0), winning the tournament with a convincing 3–0 over Ghana at the final, played on 8 July at Vélez Sársfield. Argentina won its fourth youth title unbeaten, scoring 27 goals in 7 matches, conceding 4. River Plate's forward Javier Saviola was awarded with the Golden Shoe (as the topscorer with 11) and Golden Ball as the best player of the tournament. Likewise, Argentina was awarded the FIFA Fair Play Award for the second-straight time. Apart from the multi-awarded Saviola, the national squad had a powerful team with most of its players being experienced playing at the domestic first division, notably Nicolás Burdisso, Leonardo Ponzio, Julio Arca, Leandro Romagnoli, Mauro Rosales, Andrés D'Alessandro and Maxi Rodríguez.

The 2001 championship was the last title won with Pékerman as coach, closing an era that brought back the prestige to Argentine football.

=== 2003–07: The success continues ===
After the departure of Pékerman, former goalkeeper Hugo Tocalli was designed to replace him. With Tocalli as coach, Argentina made its debut at 2003 championship defeating Spain 2–1. The team also beat Uzbekistan (by the same score) and Mali (3–1). Argentina finished first and unbeaten the first stage. In the round of 16, the national squad beat Egypt 2–1, then defeated United States 2-1 but Argentina lost to Brazil 1–0 at the semifinals. The team was also defeated by Colombia in the 3rd place match so Argentina finished in the 4th position of the general table. Striker Fernando Cavenaghi was the top scorer of the tournament with 4 goals.

In 2004, Pékerman was appointed to coach the Argentina senior team ahead of 2006 FIFA World Cup qualifying. One year later, Tocalli left the youth team to join Pékerman's coaching staff on the senior squad, so Francisco Ferraro was designated coach, won its fifth title at the World championship hosted by the Netherlands. Argentina lost to the United States in the first match, won against Egypt (2–1) and Germany (1–0) to qualify for the next stage. From the round of 16 to the semi-finals, Argentina successively eliminated Colombia (2–1), Spain (3–1) and Brazil (2–1) reaching the finals for the sixth time. On 2 July 2005, Argentina defeated Nigeria 2–1 in the final to win its fifth youth championship. Both goals were scored by Lionel Messi from the penalty spot. Messi was the leader of the team and his magical performances resulted in him winning both the top scorer and best player's awards.

In the 2005 team's squad, Lionel Messi was the star player and had already been a La Liga champion with FC Barcelona in the 2004–05 season. Other notable players for Argentina in that year were goalkeeper Oscar Ustari; defenders Ezequiel Garay and Julio Barroso, midfielders Pablo Zabaleta, Fernando Gago and Lucas Biglia and forwards Sergio Agüero and Neri Cardozo.

Two years later, the team won its second straight title at the 2007 FIFA U-20 World Cup, hosted by Canada. After a 0–0 draw in the debut with the Czech Republic, Argentina smashed Panama 6–0 and defeated North Korea 1–0 to secure qualification to the second round. In the knockout stage, Argentina eliminated Poland (3–1), followed by Mexico (1–0) and Chile (3–0) en route to the final. In the final, played on 22 July, Argentina won its sixth title after defeating the Czechs 3–1. Sergio Agüero, the top scorer of the championship with six goals, was also awarded the Golden Ball as best player. Other notable players on the squad were goalkeeper Sergio Romero, midfielders Éver Banega and Maxi Moralez and forwards Ángel Di María, Mauro Zárate and Pablo Piatti.

=== Since 2009: Struggle ===
Argentina's successful performances could not be repeated at the following seven U-20 World Cups. The team failed to qualify twice (2009, 2013) and was eliminated from the group stage on two occasions (2015, 2017).

== Competitive record ==
=== FIFA U-20 World Cup ===
Year	Round	Position	GP	W	D*	L	GS	GA
(Tunisia) 1977	Did not qualify							
(Japan) 1979	Champions	1st	6	6	0	0	20	2
(Australia) 1981	First round	9th	3	1	1	1	3	3
(Mexico) 1983	Runners-up	2nd	6	5	0	1	13	2
(Soviet Union) 1985	Did not qualify							
(Chile) 1987	Did not qualify							
(Saudi Arabia) 1989	Quarter-Finals	7th	4	1	0	3	3	4
(Portugal) 1991	First round	14th	3	0	1	2	2	6
(Australia) 1993	Disqualified							
(Qatar) 1995	Champions	1st	6	5	0	1	12	3
(Malaysia) 1997	Champions	1st	7	6	0	1	15	7
(Nigeria) 1999	Second round	16th	4	1	1	2	2	5
(Argentina) 2001	Champions	1st	7	7	0	0	27	4
(United Arab Emirates) 2003	Fourth Place	4th	7	5	0	2	12	8
(Netherlands) 2005	Champions	1st	7	6	0	1	12	5
(Canada) 2007	Champions	1st	7	6	1	0	16	2
(Egypt) 2009	Did not qualify							
(Colombia) 2011	Quarter-Finals	8th	5	3	2	0	6	1
(Turkey) 2013	Did not qualify							
(New Zealand) 2015	First round	20th	3	0	2	1	4	5
(South Korea) 2017	First round	17th	3	1	0	2	6	5
(Poland) 2019	Round of 16	12th	4	2	1	1	10	6
(Argentina) 2023	Round of 16	9th	4	3	0	1	10	3
(Chile) 2025	Runners-up	2nd	7	6	0	1	15	4
(Azerbaijan) (Uzbekistan) 2027	To be determined							
(Armenia) (Georgia (country)) 2029	To be determined							
Total	18/24	6 titles	93	64	9	20	188	75

=== South American Championship U-20 Record ===
Year	Round	GP	W	D^{1}	L	GS	GA
(Venezuela) 1954	Did not participate						
(Chile) 1958	Runners-up	5	2	2	1	16	10
(Colombia) 1964	Sixth Place	6	1	2	3	4	5
(Paraguay) 1967	Champions	6	2	3	1	9	7
(Paraguay) 1971	Third Place	5	3	0	2	7	3
(Chile) 1974	Fourth Place	5	1	2	2	3	5
(Peru) 1975	Third Place	5	2	2	1	7	6
(Venezuela) 1977	Sixth Place	4	0	2	2	3	5
(Uruguay) 1979	Runners-up	6	3	2	1	10	1
(Ecuador) 1981	Third Place	6	3	1	2	11	12
(Bolivia) 1983	Third Place	7	5	1	1	17	10
(Paraguay) 1985	Fifth Place	4	1	2	1	5	3
(Colombia) 1987	Third Place	6	3	1	2	9	9
(Argentina) 1988	Third Place	8	6	0	2	13	5
(Venezuela) 1991	Runners-up	7	3	3	1	12	10
(Colombia) 1992	Disqualified						
(Bolivia) 1995	Runners-up	7	5	1	1	10	3
(Chile) 1997	Champions	9	5	3	1	18	7
(Argentina) 1999	Champions	9	8	0	1	21	3
(Ecuador) 2001	Runners-up	9	5	3	1	13	6
(Uruguay) 2003	Champions	9	6	2	1	15	5
(Colombia) 2005	Third Place	9	5	4	0	19	4
(Paraguay) 2007	Runners-up	9	3	5	1	15	8
(Venezuela) 2009	Sixth Place	9	1	5	3	10	13
(Peru) 2011	Third Place	9	6	1	2	15	9
(Argentina) 2013	Seventh Place	4	1	1	2	6	7
(Uruguay) 2015	Champions	9	7	1	1	24	7
(Ecuador) 2017	Fourth Place	9	3	4	2	15	14
(Chile) 2019	Runners-up	9	5	1	3	10	6
(Colombia) 2023	Eighth place	4	1	0	3	3	6
(Venezuela) 2025	Runners-up	9	5	3	1	18	9
Total	29/31	203	101	57	45	338	198

^{1}Draws include knockout matches decided on penalty kicks.

== Individual awards ==
In addition to team victories, Argentine players have won many individual awards at FIFA World Youth Cups.

Year	Golden Ball	Golden Boot
1979	Diego Maradona	Ramón Díaz
2001	Javier Saviola	Javier Saviola
2005	Lionel Messi	Lionel Messi
2007	Sergio Agüero	Sergio Agüero

== Current squad ==
The following players were called up for the 2025 FIFA U-20 World Cup, played between 27 September – 19 October 2025.

Caps and goals correct as of 1 October 2025, after the match against Australia.

No.	Pos.	Player	Date of birth (age)	Caps	Goals	Club
1	GK	Santino Barbi	14 June 2005 (age 21)	10	0	(Argentine Football Association) Talleres
12	GK	Álvaro Busso	11 October 2006 (age 20)	0	0	(Argentine Football Association) Vélez Sarsfield
21	GK	Alain Gómez	3 March 2007 (age 19)	0	0	(Royal Spanish Football Federation) Valencia
2	DF	Tobías Ramírez	11 November 2006 (age 19)	15	0	(Argentine Football Association) River Plate
3	DF	Julio Soler	16 February 2005 (age 21)	13	0	(The Football Association) Bournemouth
4	DF	Dylan Gorosito	3 February 2005 (age 21)	10	0	(Argentine Football Association) Boca Juniors
6	DF	Juan Villalba	15 March 2006 (age 20)	9	0	(Argentine Football Association) Gimnasia y Esgrima
13	DF	Valente Pierani	22 February 2006 (age 20)	5	0	(Argentine Football Association) Estudiantes de La Plata
14	DF	Santiago Fernández	30 March 2005 (age 21)	1	0	(Argentine Football Association) Talleres
16	DF	Teo Rodríguez Pagano	12 October 2005 (age 20)	9	1	(Argentine Football Association) San Lorenzo
5	MF	Milton Delgado	16 June 2005 (age 21)	15	1	(Argentine Football Association) Boca Juniors
8	MF	Valentino Acuña	27 January 2006 (age 20)	12	0	(Argentine Football Association) Newell's Old Boys
10	MF	Álvaro Montoro	17 April 2007 (age 19)	3	0	(Brazilian Football Confederation) Botafogo
15	MF	Tomás Pérez	26 August 2005 (age 21)	4	1	(Portuguese Football Federation) Porto
18	MF	Tobías Andrada	2 February 2007 (age 19)	2	0	(Argentine Football Association) River Plate
7	FW	Maher Carrizo	19 February 2006 (age 20)	14	6	(Royal Dutch Football Association) Ajax
9	FW	Alejo Sarco	6 January 2006 (age 20)	2	3	(German Football Association) Bayer Leverkusen
11	FW	Ian Subiabre	1 January 2007 (age 19)	10	5	(Argentine Football Association) River Plate
17	FW	Mateo Silvetti	14 January 2006 (age 20)	4	1	(United States Soccer Federation) Inter Miami
19	FW	Santino Andino	25 October 2005 (age 20)	11	2	(Hellenic Football Federation) Panathinaikos
20	FW	Gianluca Prestianni	31 January 2006 (age 20)	1	0	(Portuguese Football Federation) Benfica

== Top goalscorers ==
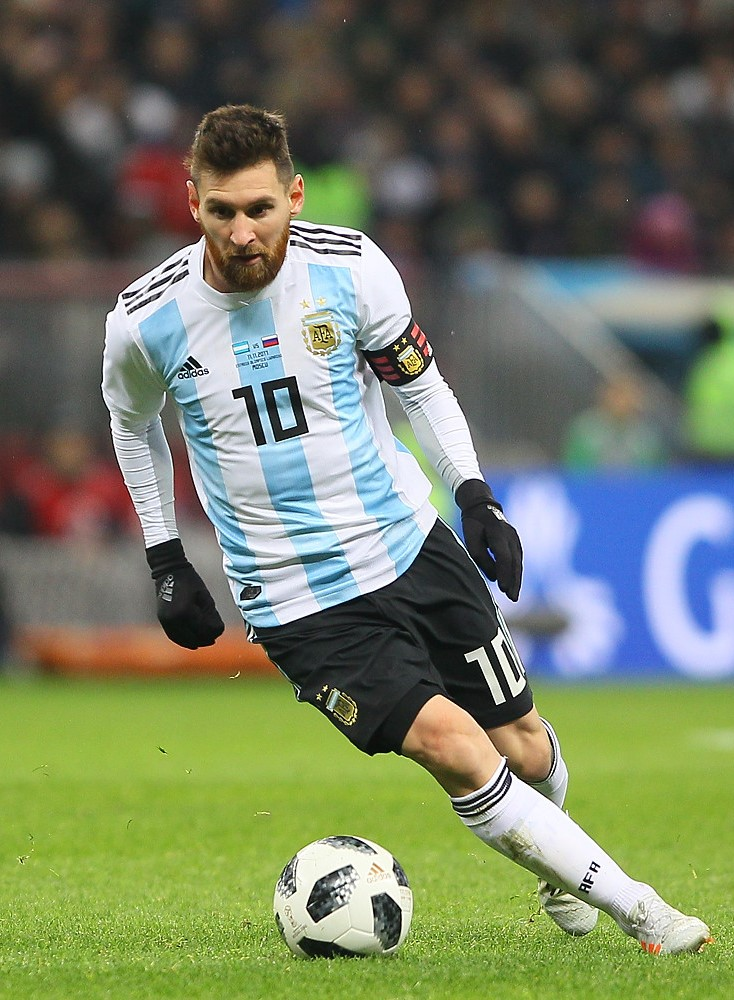
Lionel Messi is the all-time top goalscorer of Argentina U-20 national team with 14 goals

Rank	Player	Year(s)	Total Goals
1	Lionel Messi	2004–05	14
2	Fernando Cavenaghi	2003	12
3	Javier Saviola	2001	11
4	Luciano Galletti	1999	10
4	Giovanni Simeone	2015	10
5	Ramón Díaz	1979	8
5	Bernardo Romeo	1997	8
6	Diego Maradona	1979	7
6	Juan Esnáider	1991	7
6	Juan Román Riquelme	1997	7
6	Pablo Aimar	1997–99	7
6	Marcelo Torres	2017	7
6	Lautaro Martínez	2017	7
7	Leonardo Biagini	1995	6
7	Sergio Agüero	2007	6
7	Ángel Correa	2016	6
7	Claudio Echeverri	2025	6

== Honours ==
- FIFA U-20 World Cup
  - (gold) Champions (6): 1979, 1995, 1997, 2001, 2005, 2007
  - (silver) Runners-up (2): 1983, 2025
- CONMEBOL Sub 20
  - (gold) Champions (5): 1967, 1997, 1999, 2003, 2015
  - (silver) Runners-up (8): 1958, 1979, 1991, 1995, 2001, 2007, 2019, 2025
  - (bronze) Third Place (8): 1971, 1975, 1981, 1983, 1987, 1988, 2005, 2011
- Pan American Games
  - (gold) Gold Medal (1): 2003 (Note: CONMEBOL teams (included Argentina) played that tournament with their U-20 squads.)
- Toulon Tournament
  - (gold) Champions (2): 1975, 1998
  - (silver) Runners-up (2): 1983, 1999
  - (bronze) Third Place (2): 2003, 2009
- Granatkin Memorial
  - (gold) Champions (1): 2019

== Former squads ==
=== FIFA World Cup ===
- 2023
- 2019
- 2017
- 2015
- 2011
- 2007
- 2005
- 2003
- 2001
- 1999
- 1997
- 1995
- 1991
- 1989
- 1983
- 1981
- 1979

== Head-to-head record ==
The following table shows Argentina's head-to-head record in the FIFA U-20 World Cup.

Opponent	Pld	W	D	L	GF	GA	GD	Win %
Algeria	1	1	0	0	5	0	+5	100.00
Australia	3	1	0	2	8	7	+1	33.33
Austria	2	1	1	0	3	0	+3	50.00
Brazil	6	3	0	3	6	4	+2	50.00
Cameroon	2	2	0	0	3	0	+3	100.00
Canada	1	1	0	0	2	1	+1	100.00
Chile	1	1	0	0	3	0	+3	100.00
China	2	2	0	0	7	1	+6	100.00
Colombia	3	2	0	1	4	3	+1	66.67
Croatia	1	0	1	0	0	0	+0	0.00
Cuba	1	1	0	0	3	1	+2	100.00
Czech Republic	3	2	1	0	4	1	+3	66.67
England	4	1	2	1	3	5	−2	25.00
Egypt	4	4	0	0	13	3	+10	100.00
Finland	1	1	0	0	2	0	+2	100.00
France	1	1	0	0	3	1	+2	100.00
Germany	1	1	0	0	1	0	+1	100.00
Ghana	3	1	0	2	5	4	+1	33.33
Guatemala	1	1	0	0	3	0	+3	100.00
Guinea	1	1	0	0	5	0	+5	100.00
Honduras	1	1	0	0	4	2	+2	100.00
Hungary	1	1	0	0	3	0	+3	100.00
Indonesia	1	1	0	0	5	0	+5	100.00
Iraq	1	0	0	1	0	1	−1	0.00
Italy	1	1	0	0	1	0	+1	100.00
Jamaica	1	1	0	0	5	1	+4	100.00
Kazakhstan	1	1	0	0	1	0	+1	100.00
Korea	1	0	0	1	0	1	−1	0.00
Mali	2	1	1	0	5	3	+2	50.00
Mexico	4	3	0	1	5	4	+1	75.00
Morocco	1	0	0	1	0	2	−2	0.00
Netherlands	2	2	0	0	3	1	+2	100.00
New Zealand	1	1	0	0	5	0	+5	100.00
Nigeria	3	2	0	1	6	3	+3	66.67
North Korea	2	2	0	0	4	0	+4	100.00
Norway	1	1	0	0	2	0	+2	100.00
Panama	2	1	1	0	8	2	+6	50.00
Paraguay	1	1	0	0	5	0	+5	100.00
Poland	3	3	0	0	8	2	+6	100.00
Portugal	4	1	1	2	2	4	−2	25.00
Republic of Ireland	2	1	1	0	3	2	+1	50.00
South Africa	1	1	0	0	5	2	+3	100.00
South Korea	2	0	0	2	2	4	−2	0.00
Soviet Union	1	1	0	0	3	1	+2	100.00
Spain	4	3	0	1	9	4	+5	75.00
United States	2	1	0	1	2	2	+0	50.00
Uruguay	2	2	0	0	4	1	+3	100.00
Uzbekistan	2	2	0	0	4	2	+2	100.00
Yugoslavia	1	1	0	0	1	0	+1	100.00
Total	93	64	9	20	188	75	+113	68.82

== See also ==
- Argentina national under-17 football team
- Argentina national under-15 football team
- Argentina Olympic football team
- Argentina national football team
- Argentina national futsal team

== Bibliography ==
- World Youth Cup (U-20) Overview (with links to each tournament) at RSSSF
