= Robin Rae =

Scottish footballer

Personal information
- Date of birth: 18 January 1964 (age 62)
- Place of birth: Musselburgh, Scotland
- Position: Goalkeeper

Youth career
- Musselburgh Windsor

Senior career*
| Years | Team | Apps | (Gls) |
| 1981–1985 | Hibernian | 13 | (0) |
| 1985–1986 | Greenock Morton | 11 | (0) |
| 1986 | Hamilton Academical | 2 | (0) |
- Ormiston Primrose
- Bonnyrigg Rose Athletic
| 1991–1992 | Berwick Rangers | 2 | (0) |
- Bonnyrigg Rose Athletic
| Total | | 28 | (0) |
Medal record
Scotland
UEFA European U-18 Championship
| Winner | 1982 Finland | Team competition |
- * Club domestic league appearances and goals

Robin Rae (born 18 January 1964, in Musselburgh) is a Scottish former football goalkeeper, who played for Hibernian, Morton, Hamilton and Berwick in the Scottish Football League. Rae also represented Scotland at youth international level and he played in the team that won the UEFA European Under-18 Football Championship in 1982.

Rae also played as a centre forward in junior football.
