= Jim Dobbin (footballer) =

Scottish footballer

Personal information
- Full name: James Dobbin
- Date of birth: 17 September 1963 (age 63)
- Place of birth: Dunfermline, Scotland
- Height: 5 ft 9 in (1.75 m)
- Position: Midfielder

Youth career
- Whitburn Boys Club

Senior career*
Years	Team	Apps	(Gls)
1980–1984	Celtic	12	(4)
1984	→ Motherwell (loan)	2	(0)
1984–1986	Doncaster Rovers	64	(13)
1986–1991	Barnsley	129	(12)
1991–1996	Grimsby Town	164	(21)
1996–1997	Rotherham United	19	(0)
1997–1998	Doncaster Rovers	31	(0)
1998	Scarborough	1	(0)
1998–1999	Grimsby Town	6	(0)
1998–1999	→ Southport (loan)	3	(0)
1999	Gainsborough Trinity		
1999	Boston United	1	(0)
1999–2000	Whitby Town		
Total		428	(50)

International career
- Scotland under-18
Medal record
Scotland
UEFA European U-18 Championship
Winner	1982 Finland	Team competition
- * Club domestic league appearances and goals

James Dobbin (born 17 September 1963) is a Scottish former professional footballer, who played as a midfielder from 1980 until 2000.

He played for Celtic, Barnsley and Grimsby Town. He also played for Motherwell, Doncaster Rovers, Rotherham United, Scarborough, Southport, Gainsborough Trinity, Boston United and Whitby Town.

== Career ==
A schoolboy international, Dobbin started his career at Celtic. In 1982, he was part of the Scotland under-18 squad which won the European Under-18 Championship, although he missed out due to injury. He played in the FIFA World Youth Championship held in Mexico the following year, and scored twice in a 2–0 win against South Korea. Dobbin's chances at Celtic were limited and he made only a handful of league appearances, with a similar return from a loan spell at Motherwell.

In March 1984, Dobbin left Scotland and moved to Doncaster Rovers, signing alongside Scotland under-18 colleague John Philliben. Dobbin spent two and a half years at Belle Vue before moving to Barnsley in 1986. Spending five years at Oakwell, Dobbin featured in over 100 league matches for The Tykes, before beginning the first of two spells with Grimsby Town in 1991. Dobbin's £200,000 move saw him go on to make over 150 league appearances for Grimsby before his release at the end of the 1995–96 season. From here, Dobbin spent a year with Rotherham United, appearing in around half of the club's matches before re-joining Doncaster for the 1997–98 season. A regular during this season, Doncaster were struggling at the bottom and released Dobbin before the end of the season, allowing him to join Scarborough. After just one match, Dobbin returned to Grimsby, featuring twice in the remainder of the season. He played another four matches at the start of the following season before being loaned to Southport for the latter part. In 1999-00, Dobbin spent time with three part-time clubs, turning out for Gainsborough Trinity, Boston United and Whitby Town before retiring at the end of the season.

== Personal life ==
After his retirement from football, Dobbin worked on a building site, and as a gas engineer for Npower. He also covers Barnsley home games for Opta. His daughter Beth Dobbin is an athlete who broke the Scottish women's 200m record in 2018 and represented Great Britain and Northern Ireland at the 2018 Athletics World Cup.

== Masters football ==
Since his retirement he has played in three Masters football tournaments for Celtic once and twice for Barnsley.

== Honours ==
=== Scotland ===
- European Under-18 Championship: 1982

=== Grimsby Town ===
- Football League Trophy: Winners: 1998
- Football League Division Two: Play-off winners: 1998
