= Bolesław Błaszczyk =

Polish footballer

Personal information
- Full name: Bolesław Błaszczyk
- Date of birth: 28 June 1964 (age 62)
- Place of birth: Gdynia, Poland
- Height: 1.76 m (5 ft 9 1/2 in)
- Position: Forward

Youth career
- 1975–1976: Arka Gdynia
- 1976–1980: Lechia Gdańsk

Senior career*
| Years | Team | Apps | (Gls) |
| 1980–1982 | Lechia Gdańsk | 22 | (6) |
| 1983–1984 | Bałtyk Gdynia | 38 | (5) |
| 1985 | Śląsk Wrocław | 0 | (0) |
| 1985 | Chrobry Głogów | 7 | (1) |
| 1986–1989 | Bałtyk Gdynia | 54 | (11) |
| Total | | 121 | (23) |

International career
| 1980 | Poland U17 | | |
| 1983 | Poland U20 | | |
Medal record
Men's football
Representing Poland
FIFA World Youth Championship
| Third place | 1983 Mexico |
- * Club domestic league appearances and goals

Bolesław Błaszczyk (born 28 June 1964) is a Polish former professional footballer who played as a forward.

== Biography ==
Błaszczyk started his career in the youth teams of Arka Gdynia and Lechia Gdańsk. Błaszczyk made his first team debut in the Polish Cup in a 0–0 draw with Zawisza Bydgoszcz aged 16 years, 2 months, and 13 days, making his league debut 3 days later against Stoczniowiec Gdańsk. During his time at Lechia, he played in the early stages of the III liga win and the 1982–83 Polish Cup win.

In January 1983, Błaszczyk moved to Bałtyk Gdynia, playing a total of 38 games scoring 5 goals over the span of 2 years. During his time at Bałtyk he played in the 1983 under-20's World Cup, being part of the squad that finished in third place.

In January 1985 Błaszczyk moved to the Silesia region as part of his military service and joined Śląsk Wrocław as a result. During his time at Śląsk, he played for the reserves.

After failing to make a first team appearance for Śląsk, he joined Chrobry Głogów for the rest of his military service, playing 7 league games for the team. After his military service, Błaszczyk moved back to Bałtyk Gdynia. His playing career ended at the age of 25 due to injury.

== Honours ==
Lechia Gdańsk

- III liga, group II: 1982–83
- Polish Cup: 1982–83

Poland U20

- FIFA World Youth Championship third place: 1983
