= Jarosław Bako =

Polish footballer (born 1964)

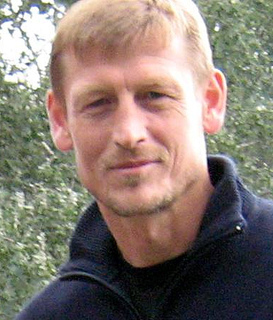
- Bako in 2007

Personal information
- Full name: Jarosław Bako
- Date of birth: 12 August 1964 (age 62)
- Place of birth: Olsztyn, Poland
- Height: 1.99 m (6 ft 6 in)
- Position: Goalkeeper

Senior career*
Years	Team	Apps	(Gls)
1981–1982	Stomil Olsztyn		
1982–1985	ŁKS Łódź	69	(0)
1985–1986	Olimpia Złocieniec		
1986–1987	Legia Warsaw	0	(0)
1987–1989	ŁKS Łódź	77	(0)
1989–1991	Zagłębie Lubin	49	(0)
1991–1993	Beşiktaş	52	(0)
1993–1994	Lech Poznań	11	(0)
1994–1996	Hapoel Tel Aviv	85	(0)
1996–1997	Hapoel Jerusalem	26	(0)
1997–2000	Stomil Olsztyn	43	(0)
2000	Jeziorak Iława	5	(0)
2003	GKS Stawiguda		
2003–2004	Tęcza Biskupiec		

International career
- Poland U20
1988–1993	Poland	35	(0)

Managerial career
- 2010–2012: Polonia Warsaw (goalkeeping coach)
- 2012–2013: Polonia Warsaw (assistant)
- 2013–2014: Jagiellonia Białystok (goalkeeping coach)
- 2014–2017: Zagłębie Lubin (goalkeeping coach)
- 2018–2021: Lechia Gdańsk (goalkeeping coach)
- 2022–2024: Zagłębie Lubin (goalkeeping coach)
- 2024: Zagłębie Lubin (youth) (goalkeeping coach)
Medal record
Men's football
Representing Poland
FIFA World Youth Championship
Third place	1983 Mexico
- * Club domestic league appearances and goals

Jarosław Bako (born 12 August 1964) is a Polish former professional footballer who played as a goalkeeper. He was most recently the goalkeeping coach for Zagłębie Lubin's junior teams. Bako was also a member of the Poland national team in the early 1990s and was capped 35 times.

== Career statistics ==
Appearances and goals by national team and year
National team	Year	Apps	Goals
Poland	1988	1	0
Poland	1989	9	0
Poland	1990	10	0
Poland	1991	5	0
Poland	1992	6	0
Poland	1993	4	0
Total		35	0

== Honours ==
Zagłębie Lubin

- Ekstraklasa: 1990–91

Beşiktaş

- Süper Lig: 1991–92

Poland U20

- FIFA World Youth Championship third place: 1983
