= Mauricinho =

Brazilian footballer

Personal information
- Full name: Maurício Poggi Villela
- Date of birth: December 29, 1963 (age 62)
- Place of birth: Ribeirão Preto, SP, Brazil
- Position: Striker

Senior career*
Years	Team	Apps	(Gls)
1981–1983	Comercial (Ribeirão Preto)		
1984–1988	Vasco		
1989	Palmeiras		
1989	Espanyol	4	(0)
1990–1991	Louletano	16	(4)
1991	Vasco		
1992	Bragantino		
1993	Remo		
1994	Ponte Preta		
1994	Botafogo		
1995	Kyoto Purple Sanga		
1996	Botafogo		
1997–1999	Vasco		
2000	Comercial (Ribeirão Preto)		

International career
1983	Brazil U-20		
Medal record
Men's football
Representing Brazil
Pan American Games
Silver medal – second place	1983 Caracas	Team
- * Club domestic league appearances and goals

Maurício Poggi Villela (born 29 December 1963), commonly known as Mauricinho, is a former football striker who played professionally in Brazil, Japan, Portugal and Spain.

== Career ==
Born in Ribeirão Preto, Mauricinho began playing football with local side Comercial Futebol Clube. He appeared in more than 100 Campeonato Brasileiro matches while playing for CR Vasco da Gama, Clube Atlético Bragantino, Clube do Remo and Botafogo de Futebol e Regatas.

In September 1989, Mauricinho signed with RCD Espanyol, where he would only make four Segunda División appearances before the club released him in December 1989.

Mauricinho played for the Brazil team which won the 1983 FIFA World Youth Championship in Mexico. He was named in the team of the tournament. Later that year, Mauricinho made an appearance for Brazil at the 1983 Pan American Games.
