= Geovani Silva =

Brazilian footballer (1964–2026)

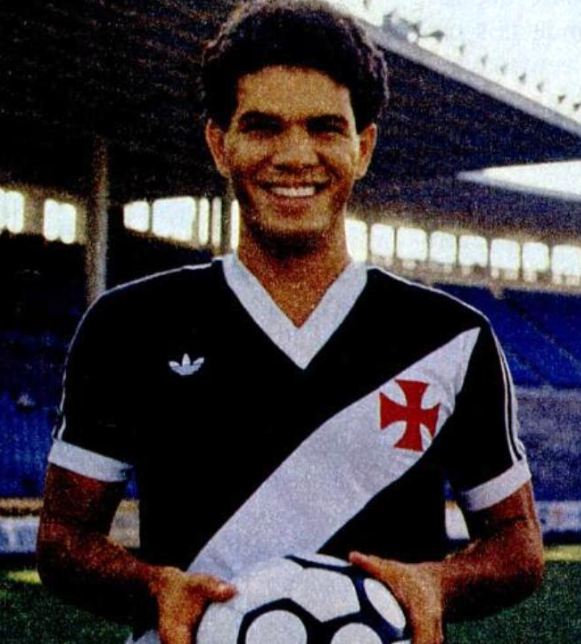
- Geovani in 1988

Personal information
- Full name: Geovani Faria da Silva
- Date of birth: 6 April 1964
- Place of birth: Vitória, Espírito Santo, Brazil
- Date of death: 18 May 2026 (aged 62)
- Place of death: Vila Velha, Espírito Santo, Brazil
- Position: Midfielder

Senior career*
Years	Team	Apps	(Gls)
1981–1983	Desportiva Ferroviária	9	(0)
1983–1989	Vasco da Gama	94	(12)
1989–1990	Bologna	27	(2)
1990–1991	Karlsruher SC	17	(3)
1992–1993	Vasco da Gama	23	(2)
1993–1994	Tigres UANL	26	(1)
1995–1996	Vasco da Gama	10	(0)
1997	Desportiva Capixaba		
1998	Linhares		
1999	Serra FC		
2000	Desportiva Capixaba		
2001	Rio Branco		
2001–2002	Tupy		

International career
1983	Brazil U20	-	(6)
1988	Brazil U23	5	(1)
1985–1991	Brazil	23	(5)
Medal record
Men's football
Representing Brazil
Olympic Games
Silver medal – second place	1988 Seoul	Team competition
Copa América
First place	1989 Brazil	National team
FIFA U-20 World Cup
First place	1983 Mexico	U-20 team
- * Club domestic league appearances and goals

Geovani Faria da Silva (6 April 1964 – 18 May 2026), referred to simply as Geovani Silva or Geovani, was a Brazilian professional footballer who played as a midfielder.

== Career ==
Geovani began his career at 16 in Desportiva Ferroviária. In 1983, he was transferred to Vasco da Gama, where he became famous, playing alongside the likes of Romário and Roberto Dinamite. He represented Brazil at the 1983 FIFA World Youth Championship, where he became the top scorer, and was also elected as the best player of the tournament. He scored the only goal in the final, where Brazil beat Argentina 1–0.

He received 24 senior international caps from May 1985 to September 1991 and captained Brazil at the 1988 Summer Olympics, winning a silver medal. He was also a member of the 1989 Copa América-winning Brazilian squad.

Between 1989 and 1991 he played in Europe at Bologna and Karlsruher SC, before moving back to Vasco da Gama. For the rest of his career he played for various Brazilian clubs, with a brief stint at Tigres UANL in Mexico. He ended his career in 2002.

In 2006, he was elected as State Deputy of the state of Espírito Santo.

== Death ==
Geovani died on 18 May 2026, at the age of 62, after suffering a cardiorespiratory arrest.

== Honours ==
Desportiva Ferroviária

- Campeonato Capixaba: 1980, 1981, 2000

Vasco da Gama

- Campeonato Carioca: 1982, 1987, 1988, 1992, 1993

Serra FC

- Campeonato Capixaba: 1999

Brazil

- Summer Olympics runner-up: 1988
- Copa América: 1989
- FIFA U-20 World Cup: 1983

Individual

- FIFA U-20 World Cup Golden Ball: 1983
- FIFA U-20 World Cup Golden Shoe: 1983
- South American Player of the Year (El Mundo) third place: 1988
- South American Team of the Year: 1988
