= Shin Yon-ho =

South Korean footballer

Personal information
- Full name: Shin Yon-ho
- Date of birth: 8 May 1964 (age 62)
- Place of birth: Yeosu, Jeonnam, South Korea
- Height: 1.76 m (5 ft 9 1/2 in)
- Positions: Striker; midfielder

College career
Years	Team	Apps	(Gls)
1983–1986	Korea University		

Senior career*
Years	Team	Apps	(Gls)
1987–1994	Hyundai Horang-i	155	(11)

International career
1982–1983	South Korea U20	6	(4)
1983–1984	South Korea	12	(5)

Managerial career
- 2002–2006: Honam University
- 2005: South Korea Universiade
- 2007: Daegu FC (assistant)
- 2009–2020: Dankook University
- 2021–: Korea University
Medal record
Representing South Korea
Men's football
AFC Youth Championship
Gold medal – first place	1982 Thailand	Team
- * Club domestic league appearances and goals

Shin Yon-ho (Korean: 신연호; born 8 May 1964) is a South Korean footballer. He is currently manager of Korea University.

== Playing career ==
While playing as a striker for South Korean under-20 team in the 1983 FIFA World Youth Championship, Shin attracted attention by scoring three goals including two goals in the quarter-final match against Uruguay. He played for senior national team in the 1984 Summer Olympics qualification after the World Youth Championship. However, he changed his role to a midfielder after suffering from arthritis during his university days.

== Honours ==
Korea University

- Korean National Championship: 1985

Hyundai Horang-i

- Korean National Championship runner-up: 1989
- Korean League Cup runner-up: 1993

Hyundai Horang-i B

- Korean President's Cup runner-up: 1990

South Korea U20

- AFC Youth Championship: 1982
