= Julio Gaona =

Argentine footballer

Personal information
- Full name: Julio César Gaona
- Date of birth: 10 July 1973 (age 53)
- Place of birth: Misiones, Argentina
- Height: 1.88 m (6 ft 2 in)
- Position: Goalkeeper

Senior career*
Years	Team	Apps	(Gls)
1992–1994	Sol de América		
1995–1996	Sportivo Luqueño		
1996–1998	Quilmes	26	(0)
1998–1999	Arsenal de Sarandí	1	(0)
1999–2001	Atlético Rafaela	27	(0)
2001–2002	Olimpo	21	(0)
2002	Junior		
2003–2004	Rosario Central	49	(0)
2004–2005	Olimpo	31	(0)
2006	Unión Española	26	(0)
2008	3 de Febrero	20	(0)
2009–2014	Crucero del Norte	165	(0)
2014	Sol de América Formosa	2	(0)
2019	Deportivo Itapuense		

Managerial career
- 2016: Caaguazú (assistant)
- 2016: Crucero del Norte (gk coach)
- 2018: Caaguazú
- * Club domestic league appearances and goals

Julio César Gaona (born 10 June 1973) is an Argentine former association football goalkeeper.

== Teams ==
- (Paraguay) Sol de América 1992–1994
- (Paraguay) Sportivo Luqueño 1995–1996
- (Argentina) Quilmes 1996–1998
- (Argentina) Arsenal de Sarandí 1998–1999
- (Argentina) Atlético Rafaela 1999–2001
- (Argentina) Olimpo 2001–2002
- (Colombia) Junior 2002
- (Argentina) Rosario Central 2003–2004
- (Argentina) Olimpo 2004–2005
- (Chile) Unión Española 2006
- (Paraguay) 3 de Febrero 2008
- (Argentina) Crucero del Norte 2009–2014
- (Argentina) Sol de América de Formosa 2014
- (Paraguay) Deportivo Itapuense 2019

== Coaching career ==
Gaona served as assistant of Derlis Soto in Caaguazú in 2016. In the second half of the same year, he joined the technical staff of Miguel Salinas as goalkeeping coach in Crucero del Norte.

In 2018, Gaona returned to Caaguazú as head coach.
