= FC Hiré =

Ivorian football club

- Full name: FC Hiré
- Founded: 1996
- Ground: Stade Municipal d'Abidjan; Abidjan, Ivory Coast
- Capacity: 20,000
- League: Côte d'Ivoire Premier Division

FC Hiré is an Ivorian football club. In 2010, they were relegated from the highest level of football in the country. The team represents the town of Hiré.
