= Witold Wenclewski =

Polish footballer

Personal information
- Date of birth: 14 April 1964
- Place of birth: Łódź, Poland
- Date of death: 28 July 2014 (aged 50)
- Height: 1.87 m (6 ft 2 in)
- Position: Defender

Senior career*
Years	Team	Apps	(Gls)
1982–1991	ŁKS Łódź	218	(6)
1992–1993	Sokół Pniewy		
1993	Cracovia Chicago		

International career
- Poland U20
1987–1988	Poland	5	(0)
Medal record
Men's football
Representing Poland
FIFA World Youth Championship
Third place	1983 Mexico
- * Club domestic league appearances and goals

Witold Piotr Wenclewski (14 April 1964 – 28 July 2014) was a Polish footballer. He played in five matches for the Poland national team from 1987 to 1988.

== Honours ==
Poland U20

- FIFA World Youth Championship third place: 1983
