= Ally Dick =

Scottish footballer (born 1965)

Personal information
- Full name: Alastair John Dick
- Date of birth: 25 April 1965 (age 61)
- Place of birth: Stirling, Scotland
- Position: Midfielder

Youth career
- Stirling Boys Club

Senior career*
Years	Team	Apps	(Gls)
1981–1986	Tottenham Hotspur	17	(2)
1986–1988	Ajax	11	(1)
1989	Frankston Pines	27	(9)
1990	Morwell Falcons	10	(4)
1991–1993	Heidelberg United	10	(4)
1995–1996	Seven Stars		
1996–1997	Alloa Athletic	1	(0)
Total		53	(11)

International career
1982	Scotland U18		
1983	Scotland U19		
Medal record
Scotland
UEFA European U-18 Championship
Winner	1982 Finland	Team competition
- * Club domestic league appearances and goals

Alastair John Dick (born 25 April 1965) is a Scottish former professional footballer who played in the position of midfielder for clubs including Tottenham Hotspur in England and Ajax in the Netherlands. He later went on to play in South Africa and Australia. Dick also represented Scotland at schoolboy and youth level.

== Football career ==
Having come to wide attention with his performances for Scotland Schoolboys in 1980, Dick joined Tottenham Hotspur as an apprentice and played in 17 league matches and scored two goals between 1981 and 1986. He had the distinction of becoming the youngest first team player in Spurs' history up to that time, appearing at the age of 16 years and 301 days when he made his debut at White Hart Lane against Manchester City on 20 February 1982. Although John Bostock broke the record as a substitute in 2008, Dick remains the youngest to have started a match. One of the highlights of his Spurs spell was an appearance as a substitute in the second leg of the 1984 UEFA Cup Final at White Hart Lane, with several more experienced squad members unavailable through injury or suspension; however, he was himself injured during the match but played on, with the problem (torn knee ligaments) requiring an operation and causing him problems later in his career.

Johan Cruijff signed Dick for Ajax in 1986, having been alerted to his talents by Scottish club Rangers, who had decided against bringing him to Glasgow in what would have been a notable departure from their 'no Catholics' signing policy of the time, but recommended him as an option to Ajax when the Dutch club enquired about Davie Cooper and media reporting on the player failed to mention his name and focused only his religion. Part of a hugely talented Ajax squad which included Dennis Bergkamp, Aron Winter, Frank Rijkaard and Marco van Basten, Dick initially held down a place in the team but at the end of 1986 was badly injured in a European Cup Winners' Cup match against Olympiacos. Having missed the rest of the season, he featured again in the next European campaign, including playing against FC Porto in the first leg of the 1987 European Super Cup at its start, and being an unused sub in the 1988 European Cup Winners' Cup Final defeat against Belgian club KV Mechelen at its end, but the injuries had cost him the pace that was a large part of his playing style, and he fell out of favour. Dick later reflected that he had not found Cruijff's managerial style beneficial due to the contrast in their personalities, but that he could have done more in approaching the manager for guidance when he had the opportunity.

Following short periods at Wimbledon and Brighton and Hove Albion without making any League appearances for either, he went on to play in Australia for clubs including Frankston Pines, Morwell Falcons and Heidelberg, winning the National League Cup in 1992.

He also for Seven Stars (now Ajax Cape Town) in South Africa before injury ended his career at Scottish club Alloa Athletic in 1997 at the age of 32.

== After football ==
Dick worked for Associated Newspapers (Daily Mail and Mail on Sunday). He also holds a UEFA 'B' coaching licence. In 2011, he was appointed as one of the head coaches in Stirling Albion's youth academy, and also worked as a coach at Stirling University.

== Honours ==
Tottenham Hotspur

- UEFA Cup: 1984

Ajax

- UEFA Cup Winners' Cup runner-up: 1988
- UEFA Super Cup runner-up: 1987

Heidelberg United

- National Soccer League Cup: 1993

Scotland Youth

- UEFA under-18 Championship : 1982
- Victory Shield: 1980
- Dentyne Trophy: 1980
