= Ian Westwater =

English footballer (born 1963)

Personal information
- Date of birth: 8 November 1963 (age 62)
- Place of birth: Loughborough, England
- Position: Goalkeeper

Senior career*
Years	Team	Apps	(Gls)
1979–1985	Hearts	2	(0)
1985–1991	Dunfermline	192	(0)
1991–1994	Falkirk	67	(0)
1994	Dundee	0	(0)
1994–2000	Dunfermline	111	(0)
2000–2004	Hibernian	0	(0)
Total		372	(0)
Medal record
Scotland
UEFA European U-18 Championship
Winner	1982 Finland	Team competition
- * Club domestic league appearances and goals

Ian Westwater (born 8 November 1963) is a Scottish former professional footballer who played as a goalkeeper, spending the majority of his career with Scottish side Dunfermline Athletic.

== Playing career ==
Westwater was born in Loughborough, England. He started his career with Scottish Premier Division side Hearts, making his debut for the Tynecastle side at just 16 years of age. He went on to play only one other game for the side, before being signed by Dunfermline Athletic for £4,000 in March 1985. It was with Dunfermline that Westwater would be most prosperous, playing in over 190 games in his first spell at the club. His debut came against Stranraer in April 1985.

Westwater moved to local rivals Falkirk in a player swap deal in August 1991, where in his first season he helped the club gain promotion to the Scottish Premier Division. After being relegated in 1993, he again helped the side in 1994 in their promotion winning season before moving on a short-term deal to Dundee.

After playing no games for Dundee, Westwater moved back to Dunfermline Athletic for his second spell with the club, signing for £15,000. He stayed with the Pars, helping them achieve promotion to the Scottish Premier Division in 1996. He played in over 110 league games in his second spell but towards the end of his Dunfermline career, he was ousted by younger goalkeepers. He made the short move across the River Forth to Easter Road side Hibernian in 2000, where he would fail to play any matches before hanging up his gloves in 2004.

== Coaching career ==
During his spell with Hibernian, Westwater was the goalkeeping coach for the Leith side. He had to retire from football completely in 2005 due to injury and was replaced by Gordon Marshall as Hibs' goalkeeping coach.

== Honours ==
Dunfernline Athletic

- Scottish First Division: 1988–89, 1995–96
- Scottish Second Division: 1985–86

Falkirk

- Scottish Challenge Cup: 1993–94

Scotland U18

- UEFA European Under-18 Championship: 1982
