= Brian Rice (footballer) =

Scottish footballer (born 1963)

Personal information
- Date of birth: 11 October 1963 (age 63)
- Place of birth: Bellshill, Scotland
- Position: Midfielder

Team information
- Current team: Livingston (Head of Football Operations)

Senior career*
Years	Team	Apps	(Gls)
1980–1985	Hibernian	84	(11)
1985–1991	Nottingham Forest	92	(9)
1986	→ Grimsby Town (loan)	4	(0)
1989	→ West Bromwich Albion (loan)	3	(0)
1991	→ Stoke City (loan)	18	(0)
1991–1995	Falkirk	101	(8)
1995–1997	Dunfermline Athletic	10	(0)
1997–1999	Clyde	49	(2)
2000	Greenock Morton	1	(0)
Total		362	(30)

International career
1984	Scotland U21	1	(0)

Managerial career
- 2019–2021: Hamilton Academical
- 2022–2023: Alloa Athletic
Medal record
Scotland
UEFA European U-18 Championship
Winner	1982 Finland	Team competition
- * Club domestic league appearances and goals

Brian Rice (born 11 October 1963) is a Scottish football coach and former player, who is currently first team coach to David Martindale at Scottish Premiership club Livingston.

Rice played for Hibernian, Nottingham Forest, Grimsby Town, West Bromwich Albion, Stoke City, Falkirk, Dunfermline Athletic, Clyde and Greenock Morton.

Since his retirement from playing, Rice has worked as a coach for Greenock Morton, Airdrieonians, Falkirk, Hibernian, Inverness Caledonian Thistle, St Mirren and Livingston. He has also managed Hamilton Academical and Alloa Athletic.

== Playing career ==
Born in Bellshill, Rice began his career with Hibernian. He made 98 appearances for Hibs in five seasons at Easter Road, scoring 12 goals. During his time at Hibs, Rice won the 1982 European Under-18 Championship with Scotland.

He was signed by Nottingham Forest manager Brian Clough for £175,000 in August 1985. During his time there, Forest won the Football League Cup twice, in 1989 and 1990. He scored a memorable winning goal in the sixth round of the FA Cup against Arsenal in 1988, and became a 'cult hero' with the fans due to his lack of pace.

Whilst a Forest player, Rice had loan spells at Grimsby (making four appearances), West Bromwich Albion (making three appearances) and Stoke City (making 18 appearances in 1990–91). He made 115 appearances for Forest scoring 12 goals.

In August 1991 he returned to Scotland and signed for Falkirk, playing for them until the early part of the 1995–96 season. He then moved to Dunfermline followed by Clyde for two seasons each, and left Clyde at the end of the 1998–99 season.

== Coaching career ==
In 2000, Rice was appointed assistant manager to Ian McCall at Greenock Morton, making one appearance as a player. Rice was then assistant manager to McCall at Airdrieonians, but the club went out of business in 2002. McCall and Rice then both moved to similar positions at Falkirk. McCall eventually moved on to Dundee United, while Rice continued at Falkirk, assisting John Hughes. He helped the club win the First Division in 2005 and reach the 2009 Scottish Cup Final.

Rice followed Hughes in returning to Hibernian when Hughes was appointed manager there in June 2009. Rice also left the club when John Hughes departed as manager by mutual consent in October 2010. As of June 2015, Rice was coaching Al Khor in the Qatar Stars League. He left Al Khor in July 2015 to work for John Hughes at Inverness Caledonian Thistle. Rice continued as assistant manager at Inverness after Richie Foran succeeded Hughes as manager, and then when John Robertson replaced Foran.

Rice left Inverness in June 2018 to take the assistant manager position at St Mirren, working for Alan Stubbs.

Rice took a lead coaching role for the first time in January 2019, when he was appointed head coach of Hamilton Academical. During January 2020, Rice admitted that he had a gambling addiction. He was banned from working on the touchline for ten matches (five of which were suspended) by the Scottish Football Association because he had regularly bet on football. This led to a wider debate in Scottish football about a perceived gambling culture, and sponsorship of clubs and competitions by gambling companies. He resigned from Hamilton in August 2021.

He was appointed Alloa Athletic manager in February 2022. Rice left this position in November 2023 to become first team coach at Livingston.

== Career statistics ==
=== Player ===
Appearances and goals by club, season and competition
Club	Season	League			FA Cup		League Cup		Other (Note: Includes Football League Trophy, Full Members Cup, Mercantile Credit Centenary Trophy and Scottish Challenge Cup.)		Total	
Club	Season	Division	Apps	Goals	Apps	Goals	Apps	Goals	Apps	Goals	Apps	Goals
Hibernian	1980–81	Scottish First Division	1	0	0	0	0	0	0	0	1	0
Hibernian	1981–82	Scottish Premier Division	1	0	0	0	1	0	0	0	2	0
Hibernian	1982–83	Scottish Premier Division	22	2	1	0	0	0	0	0	23	2
Hibernian	1983–84	Scottish Premier Division	25	5	1	0	7	1	0	0	33	6
Hibernian	1984–85	Scottish Premier Division	35	4	1	0	2	0	0	0	38	4
Hibernian	Total		84	11	3	0	11	1	0	0	98	12
Nottingham Forest	1985–86	First Division	19	3	0	0	3	2	0	0	22	5
Nottingham Forest	1986–87	First Division	3	1	0	0	1	0	0	0	4	0
Nottingham Forest	1987–88	First Division	30	2	4	1	3	0	1	0	38	3
Nottingham Forest	1988–89	First Division	20	1	0	0	5	0	1	0	26	1
Nottingham Forest	1989–90	First Division	18	2	0	0	3	0	2	0	23	2
Nottingham Forest	1990–91	First Division	1	0	0	0	0	0	0	0	1	0
Nottingham Forest	Total		92	9	4	1	15	2	4	0	115	12
Grimsby Town (loan)	1986–87	Second Division	4	0	0	0	0	0	0	0	4	0
West Bromwich Albion (loan)	1986–87	Second Division	3	0	0	0	0	0	0	0	3	0
Stoke City (loan)	1990–91	Third Division	18	0	0	0	0	0	0	0	18	0
Falkirk	1991–92	Scottish Premier Division										
Falkirk	1992–93	Scottish Premier Division										
Falkirk	1993–94	Scottish First Division										
Falkirk	1994–95	Scottish Premier Division										
Falkirk	1995–96	Scottish Premier Division										
Falkirk	Total		101	8	0	0	0	0	0	0	101	8
Dunfermline Athletic	1995–96	Scottish Premier Division	6	0	0	0	0	0	0	0	6	0
Dunfermline Athletic	1996–97	Scottish Premier Division	4	0	1	0	2	0	0	0	7	0
Dunfermline Athletic	Total		10	0	1	0	2	0	0	0	13	0
Clyde	1997–98	Scottish Second Division	31	2	1	0	1	0	1	0	34	2
Clyde	1998–99	Scottish Second Division	18	0	4	0	0	0	0	0	22	0
Clyde	Total		49	2	5	0	1	0	1	0	56	2
Greenock Morton	1999–2000	Scottish First Division	1	0	0	0	0	0	0	0	1	0
Career total			362	30	13	1	29	3	5	0	409	34

=== Managerial record ===
As of match played 4 November 2023

Managerial record by team and tenure
Team	Nat	From	To	Record						Ref
Team	Nat	From	To	G	W	D	L	Win %		Ref
Hamilton Academical	(Scotland)	31 January 2019	11 August 2021	94	23	24	47	24.47		
Alloa Athletic	(Scotland)	21 February 2022	9 November 2023	73	32	12	29	43.84		
Career Total				167	55	36	76	32.93	—	

== Honours ==
Falkirk

- Scottish Challenge Cup: 1993–94

Scotland Youth

- UEFA European Under-18 Championship: 1982
