= Dušan Horváth =

Czech footballer

Personal information
- Date of birth: 31 October 1964 (age 61)
- Position: Forward

Senior career*
Years	Team	Apps	(Gls)
1982–1983	Baník Ostrava		
1983–1984	Dukla Prague		
1985–1991	Baník Ostrava		
1988	→ ZVL Žilina (loan)		
1991–1992	Fomei Hradec Králové		
1992–1994	EPA Larnaca		
1994–1995	Karviná		
1996–1997	Alemannia Aachen		
1997–2002	Bonner SC		

International career
- Czechoslovakia U20
- * Club domestic league appearances and goals

Dušan Horváth (born 31 October 1964) is a retired Czech football striker.
