= Kim Chong-kon (footballer) =

South Korean footballer

Personal information
- Full name: Kim Chong-kon
- Date of birth: March 29, 1964 (age 62)
- Place of birth: South Korea
- Height: 1.68 m (5 ft 6 in)
- Position: Midfielder

Senior career*
Years	Team	Apps	(Gls)
1983–1984	Seoul FC		
1985–1991	Hyundai Horangi	101	(12)
1991–1992	Ilhwa Chunma	8	(0)

International career^{‡}
1982–1983	South Korea U-20	6	(1)
1984–1988	South Korea	7	(2)
- * Club domestic league appearances and goals as of 27 December 2007 ‡ National team caps and goals as of 27 December 2007

Kim Chong-kon (Korean: 김종건, born March 29, 1964, in South Korea, also romanised as Kim Jong-kun) is a South Korean footballer.

== International career ==
He was in the squad of the 1983 FIFA World Youth Championship and the 1988 Summer Olympics.
