= Vladimir Demidov =

Russian footballer

Personal information
- Full name: Vladimir Aleksandrovich Demidov
- Date of birth: 19 January 1964 (age 62)
- Place of birth: Moscow, Russian SFSR
- Height: 1.81 m (5 ft 11 1/2 in)
- Position: Defender

Youth career
- 1981–1983: Dynamo Moscow

Senior career*
Years	Team	Apps	(Gls)
1984–1988	Dynamo Moscow	42	(0)
1989–1991	Dinamo Minsk	46	(0)
1992–1994	Kiruna FF	34	(3)
- * Club domestic league appearances and goals

Vladimir Aleksandrovich Demidov (Russian: Владимир Александрович Демидов; born 19 January 1964) is a former Russian professional footballer.

== Club career ==
He made his professional debut in the Soviet Top League in 1984 for FC Dynamo Moscow. He played 1 game in the UEFA Cup 1987–88 for FC Dynamo Moscow.

== Honours ==
- Soviet Top League runner-up: 1986.
- Soviet Cup winner: 1984.
