= Rafał Stroiński =

Polish footballer

Personal information
- Date of birth: 17 June 1964 (age 62)
- Place of birth: Poznań, Poland
- Height: 1.77 m (5 ft 10 in)
- Position: Defender

Senior career*
| Years | Team | Apps | (Gls) |
| 1981 | Warta Poznań | | |
| 1981–1986 | Lech Poznań | 46 | (3) |
| 1986–1988 | Olimpia Poznań | 29 | (0) |

International career
- Poland U19
- Poland U20
Medal record
Men's football
Representing Poland
FIFA World Youth Championship
| Third place | 1983 Mexico |
- * Club domestic league appearances and goals

Rafał Stroiński (born 17 June 1964) is a Polish former professional footballer who played as a defender. He was a squad member for the Poland U20 team at the 1983 FIFA World Youth Championship.

== Honours ==
Lech Poznań

- Ekstraklasa: 1982–83, 1983–84
- Polish Cup: 1983–84

Poland U20

- FIFA World Youth Championship third place: 1983
