= Oscar Vanemerak =

Argentine footballer

Óscar Vanemerak
Personal information
- Full name: Oscar Alberto Vanemerak Bernal
- Date of birth: August 19, 1989 (age 37)
- Place of birth: Buenos Aires, Argentina
- Height: 1.72 m (5 ft 8 in)
- Position: Forward

Team information
- Current team: Bogotá F.C.

Youth career
- Millonarios

Senior career*
Years	Team	Apps	(Gls)
2007–2008	Millonarios	20	(1)
2008	Provincial Osorno	9	(5)
2009	Boyacá Chicó F.C.	6	(0)
2010–present	Bogotá F.C.		
- * Club domestic league appearances and goals

Oscar Alberto Vanemerak Bernal (born August 19, 1989, in Buenos Aires, Argentina) is an Argentine footballer, who currently plays for Bogotá F.C. in the Categoría Primera B.

== Career ==
The Argentina-born footballer began his career for the Colombian club Millonarios. After earning 20 professional caps with Millonarios, he left to sign with the Chilean club Provincial Osorno in the Liga Chilena de Fútbol: Primera División. He played the 2008 season for Provincial Osorno and scored five goals in only nine games, then returned to Colombia to sign with Boyacá Chicó F.C. After six games for Boyacá Chicó F.C., he signed in January 2010 with Bogotá F.C. of the Categoría Primera B, where he plays today.
