= Wiesław Wraga =

Polish association football player

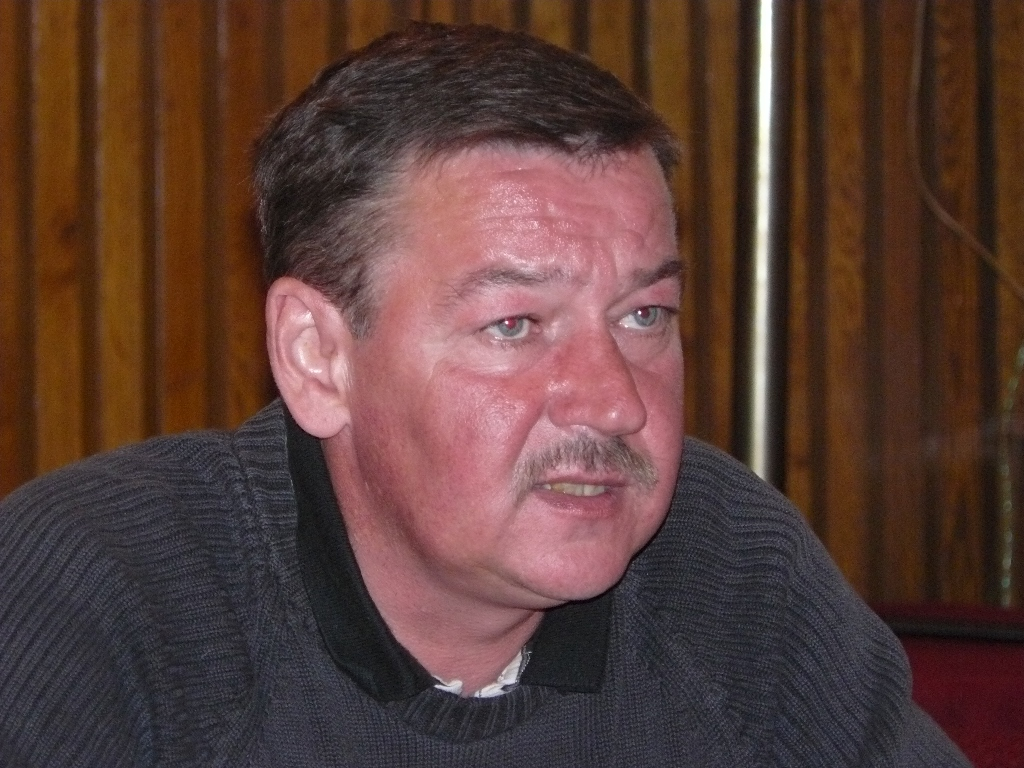
- Wiesław Wraga in 2008

Personal information
- Date of birth: 14 August 1963 (age 63)
- Place of birth: Stargard Szczeciński, Poland
- Height: 1.67 m (5 ft 5 1/2 in)
- Position: Forward

Senior career*
Years	Team	Apps	(Gls)
–1982	Błękitni Stargard		
1982-1990	Widzew Łódź	165	(12)
1990–1991	OTP	47	(9)
1992	OPS	23	(7)
1993–1994	Ślęza Wrocław		
1994–1995	RKS Radomsko		

International career
- Poland U20
1986	Poland	1	(0)
Medal record
Men's football
Representing Poland
FIFA World Youth Championship
Third place	1983 Mexico
- * Club domestic league appearances and goals

Wiesław Wraga (born 14 August 1963) is a Polish former professional footballer who played as a forward.

== Honours ==
Widzew Łódź

- Polish Cup: 1984–85

Poland U20

- FIFA World Youth Championship third place: 1983
