= Claudio García =

Argentine footballer and manager

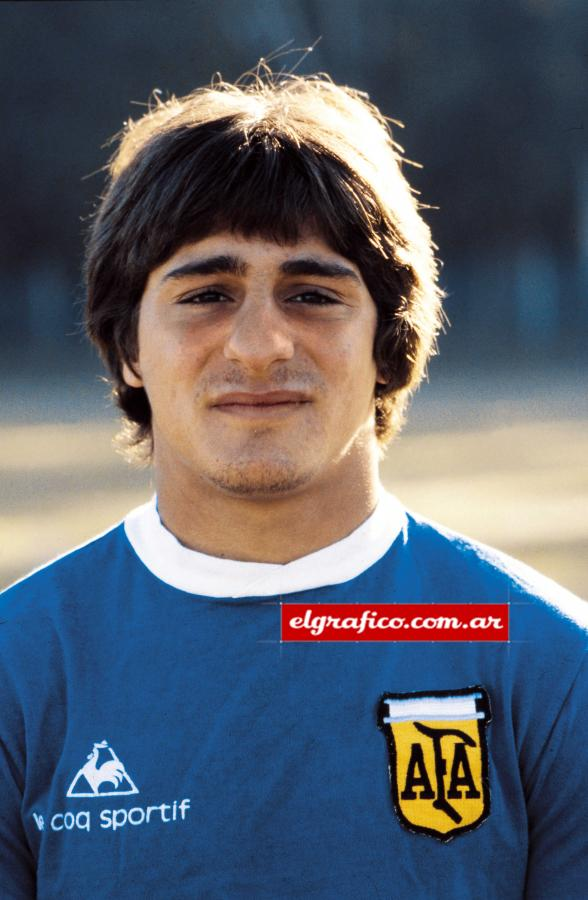
- García with the Argentina U20 team in 1981

Personal information
- Full name: Claudio Omar García
- Date of birth: 24 August 1963 (age 63)
- Place of birth: Buenos Aires, Argentina
- Position: Right winger

Senior career*
Years	Team	Apps	(Gls)
1980–1986	Huracán	202	(40)
1986–1988	Vélez Sársfield	73	(19)
1988–1990	Lyon	57	(15)
1991–1995	Racing Club	129	(26)
1995–1996	Colón de Santa Fe	30	(4)
1996–1998	Huracán	49	(11)
1998–1999	All Boys	20	(3)
1999–2000	Independiente Rivadavia	11	(1)
2000–2001	Chacarita Juniors	30	(4)
2001	Real Jaen	0	(0)

International career
1981–1983	Argentina U20	9	(1)
1991–1994	Argentina	13	(3)

Managerial career
- Defensores Unidos
- Independiente Rivadavia
- Talleres (RE)
- * Club domestic league appearances and goals

Claudio Omar Turco García (born 24 August 1963) is an Argentine former professional footballer who played as a right winger. He made 13 appearances for the Argentine national team, scoring three goals.

== Playing career ==
Born in Buenos Aires, Argentina, García started his professional career in 1980 with Club Atlético Huracán in Buenos Aires. He stayed with the club until their relegation from the Argentine Primera at the end of the 1985–1986 season.

García joined Vélez Sársfield where he played until 1988, then signed for Lyon in France, who were promoted from the 2nd to 1st Division in 1989–90, with Garcia making 57 appearances and scoring 15 goals.

In 1991 García returned to Argentine football to join Racing Club de Avellaneda. He was also given his debut for the Argentina national team in 1991. He was part of two Copa América winning campaigns in 1991 and 1993.

García played over 100 games for Racing Club between 1991 and his departure in 1995. He joined Colón de Santa Fe where he spent one season before returning to Huracán in 1996. By the end of his second spell at Huracán he had made 251 appearances, scoring 51 goals.

Towards the end of his playing days he spent time with All Boys and Independiente Rivadavia in the Argentine 2nd Division and Chacarita Juniors. In 2001, he joined Spanish lower league side Real Jaen.

== Coaching career ==
Since his retirement as a player García has worked as a football manager on a couple of occasions, with Defensores Unidos and Independiente Rivadavia. Currently, he is the manager of Talleres (RE).

== Reality shows career ==
Year	Title	Role	Status	Notes
2020	MasterChef Celebrity Argentina	Contestant	8th eliminated	45 episodes
2022	El Hotel de los Famosos	Contestant	11th eliminated	15 episodes
2023	MasterChef Argentina	Contestant special guest		1 episode
2023	Pasaplatos Edición Famosos	Contestant	13th eliminated	
2023	Bailando 2023	Contestant special guest		1 episode
2025	MasterChef Celebrity Argentina	Special guest		1 episode

== Honours ==
=== Player ===
Lyon

- Ligue 2: 1988–89

==== International ====
Argentina Youth

- South American Games: 1982

Argentina

- Copa América: 1991, 1993
- FIFA Confederations Cup: 1992
