= Pavel Karoch =

Czech footballer

Personal information
- Date of birth: 2 November 1963 (age 62)
- Place of birth: Czech Republic
- Position: Midfielder

Senior career*
Years	Team	Apps	(Gls)
-1991	FK Dukla Prague		
1982-1984	FK Mladá Boleslav→(loan)		
1983-1984	VTJ Tábor→(loan)		
1985-1987	SK Dynamo České Budějovice		
1991-1992	Liga Deportiva Alajuelense		
- * Club domestic league appearances and goals

Pavel Karoch (born 2 November 1963 in the Czech Republic) is a Czech retired footballer.
