= Jorge Luis Gabrich =

Argentine footballer

Personal information
- Full name: Jorge Luis Gabrich Luján
- Date of birth: 14 October 1963 (age 63)
- Place of birth: Chovet, Santa Fe, Argentina
- Position: Forward

Senior career*
Years	Team	Apps	(Gls)
1982–1983	Newell's Old Boys		
1983–1987	FC Barcelona	2	(0)
1985	→ Vélez Sársfield (loan)		
1986	→ Instituto (loan)		
1986–1987	→ Stade de Reims (loan)	11	(2)
1988–1989	Newell's Old Boys	4	(1)
1989–1990	Irapuato FC	38	(22)
1990–1992	Veracruz	74	(28)
1992–1994	Tecos	67	(19)

International career
1983	Argentina U20	6	(4)
- * Club domestic league appearances and goals

Jorge Luis Gabrich (born October 14, 1963) is an Argentine former professional footballer who played in the 1983 FIFA World Youth Championship and won second place in the tournament he also received the Bronze Boot award for his performance.

== Career ==
Born in Chovet, Santa Fe, Gabrich began playing professional football with local side Newell's Old Boys at age 16.

Following his performance at the 1983 youth championship, Gabrich signed for Spanish La Liga side FC Barcelona. However, due to limits on the number of foreign players in the squad, he began playing for the "B" side and would make only two La Liga appearances for the club following an injury to Diego Maradona.

Gabrich would later play in the French league and then in Mexico before returning to Argentina to play for Newell's again. He retired at age 32.

== Honours ==
UAG

- Mexican First Division: 1993–94

Argentina Youth

- South American Games: 1982
