= Martín Reyna =

Mexican footballer and manager (born 1961)

Personal information
- Full name: Martín Reyna Osorio
- Date of birth: 5 December 1961 (age 64)
- Place of birth: State of Mexico, Mexico
- Height: 1.74 m (5 ft 8 1/2 in)
- Position: Midfielder

Senior career*
Years	Team	Apps	(Gls)
1981–1984	UNAM	39	(4)
1984–1985	Oaxtepec	20	(3)
1986–1987	León	7	(0)
1986–1987	Tampico Madero	2	(0)

Managerial career
- 2003: Puebla (Assistant)
- 2007–2014: UNAM Reserves and Academy
- 2014: Toluca Reserves and Academy
- 2015–2017: Zacatepec (Assistant)
- 2018: Halcones de Morelos
- 2018–2019: Ciervos (Assistant)
- 2019: Alebrijes de Oaxaca (Assistant)
- 2020–2022: Venados (Assistant)
- 2023–2024: Oaxaca (Assistant)
- * Club domestic league appearances and goals

Martín Reyna Osorio (born 5 December 1961) is a Mexican football manager and former player.
