= Fabián Basualdo =

Argentine footballer

Personal information
- Full name: Fabián Armando Basualdo
- Date of birth: 26 February 1964 (age 62)
- Place of birth: Rosario, Argentina
- Position: Right back

Senior career*
Years	Team	Apps	(Gls)
1982–1988	Newell's Old Boys	300 (total)	(4)
1988–1993	River Plate	160	(1)
1993–1996	Newell's Old Boys	(see above)	
1997–1998	Godoy Cruz		
1998–1999	Almirante Brown		
1999–2000	Platense		

International career
1983	Argentina U20	6	(0)
1991–1993	Argentina	29	(0)
Medal record
Men's football
Representing Argentina
Copa América
Winner	1991 Chile
Winner	1993 Ecuador
FIFA Confederations Cup
Winner	1992 Saudi Arabia
- * Club domestic league appearances and goals as of May 2007

Fabián Basualdo (born 26 February 1964 in Rosario, Santa Fe) is a retired Argentine football defender who played for a number of clubs in Argentina and the Argentina national football team.

Basualdo started his career with Newell's Old Boys in 1982 and remains 5th on the all-time appearances list for the club with 300 appearances. He also helped the team to win the 1987–88 league title.

After the successful league campaign of 1987–88 he was signed by Argentine giants River Plate where he won a further 3 league titles.

In 1991 Basualdo was part of the triumphant Argentina squad that won the Copa América.

In 1993 Basualdo rejoined Newell's where he played until 1996. He then moved down a division where he played for Godoy Cruz, Almirante Brown and Club Atlético Platense before he retired in 2000.

== Honours ==
=== Club ===
Newell's Old Boys

- Primera Division Argentina: 1987–88

River Plate

- Primera Division Argentina: 1989–90, Apertura 1991, Apertura 1993

=== International ===
Argentina Youth

- South American Games: 1982, 1986

Argentina

- Copa América: 1991, 1993
- FIFA Confederations Cup: 1992
