= John Philliben =

Scottish footballer and manager

Personal information
- Full name: John Philliben
- Date of birth: 14 March 1964 (age 62)
- Place of birth: Stirling, Scotland
- Height: 5 ft 10 in (1.78 m)
- Position: Defender

Senior career*
Years	Team	Apps	(Gls)
1980–1984	Stirling Albion	109	(1)
1984–1987	Doncaster Rovers	71	(1)
1986	→ Cambridge United (loan)	6	(0)
1986–1998	Motherwell	302	(7)
1998–2000	Stirling Albion	39	(0)
Total		527	(9)

International career
- Scotland U18

Managerial career
- 1998–2000: Stirling Albion
Medal record
Scotland
UEFA European U-18 Championship
Winner	1982 Finland	Team competition
- * Club domestic league appearances and goals

John Philliben (born 14 March 1964) is a Scottish former professional football player and manager.

== Career ==
A schoolboy international, Philliben started his career at Stirling Albion. In 1982, he was part of the Scotland under-18 side which won the European Under-19 Championship, scoring in the final. He earned a £70,000 transfer to Doncaster Rovers in March 1984, becoming the club's record signing and went on to spend three years there, spending some time on loan to Cambridge United in 1986.

Philliben returned to Scotland in 1987 with Motherwell, where he spent ten years. In 1991, he helped them on their way to victory in the Scottish Cup. In 1998, Philliben left Motherwell and returned to first club Stirling Albion as player/manager, although he returned to Motherwell on 25 July 2008 for his testimonial match against West Ham United. Philliben spent two years in charge at Forthbank but could only guide the side to mid-table finishes and was sacked at the end of the 1999–2000. After returning to Motherwell as coach, Philliben was placed temporarily in charge with Miodrag Krivokapic after Billy Davies' sacking. Although then chief executive Pat Nevin said he had "not harmed his chances" of being appointed on a permanent basis, Eric Black was appointed instead.

As of May 2005, Philliben was working outside of football as a driving instructor in his native Stirling.

== Honours ==
=== Player ===
Doncaster Rovers

- Fourth Division promoted: 1983–84

Motherwell

- Scottish Cup: 1990–91
- Premier Division runner-up: 1994–95
- Tennents' Sixes runner-up: 1988

Scotland

- European Under-18 Championship: 1982

=== Manager ===
Stirling Albion

- Stirlingshire Cup: 1998–99
