= Oscar Acosta (footballer) =

Argentine footballer

Personal information
- Full name: Oscar Román Acosta
- Date of birth: 18 October 1964 (age 62)
- Place of birth: Rosario, Argentina
- Position: Midfielder

Youth career
- 1980–1982: Ferro Carril Oeste

Senior career*
Years	Team	Apps	(Gls)
1982–1989	Ferro Carril Oeste	?	(?)
1989–1990	Servette	?	(?)
1990–1991	Vélez Sársfield	28	(6)
1991	ANA SC	12	(0)
1992	River Plate	12	(2)
1992–1993	San Martín de Tucumán	30	(3)
1993–1994	Banfield	32	(0)
1994	Gimnasia y Esgrima de Jujuy	18	(1)
1995	Universidad de Chile	10	(1)
1995–1996	Argentinos Juniors	14	(1)
1996	Coquimbo Unido	?	(?)
1997	Barcelona Sporting Club	?	(?)
1998–1999	Banfield	?	(?)
2000–2001	Ferro Carril Oeste	0	(0)

International career
1987	Argentina	1	(0)
- * Club domestic league appearances and goals as of October 2008

Oscar Román Acosta (born 18 October 1964 in Rosario) is a retired Argentine football midfielder who won two Primera División Argentina titles with Ferro Carril Oeste.

Acosta joined Ferro Carril Oeste at the age of 16, in 1982 he was part of the squad that won the club's first ever league title; Nacional 1982. He was also part of the team that won the Nacional in 1984. He played for the club until 1989.

Acosta was selected to join the Argentina squad for Copa América 1987 but he only ever played in one game for his national team.

Acosta also played for Vélez Sársfield, River Plate, San Martín de Tucumán, Banfield, Gimnasia y Esgrima de Jujuy and Argentinos Juniors in the Argentine Primera.

Nicknamed "Bocha" Acosta played abroad for Servette of Switzerland, ANA SC of Japan, Universidad de Chile and Coquimbo Unido of Chile and Barcelona Sporting Club of Ecuador.

== Honours ==
=== Club ===
Ferro Carril Oeste

- Primera División Argentina (2): 1982, 1984

Universidad de Chile

- Primera División de Chile (1): 1995

Argentina Youth

- South American Games: 1982, 1986
