= Mario Vanemerak =

Argentine footballer and manager

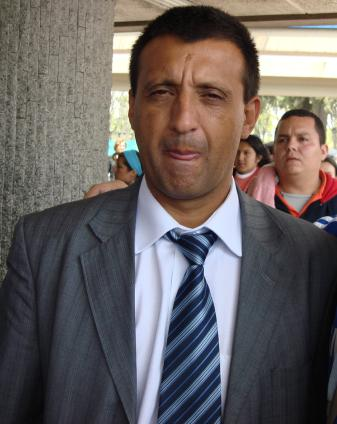

Personal information
- Full name: Mario Alberto Vanemerak
- Date of birth: October 21, 1963 (age 63)
- Place of birth: Firmat, Argentina
- Position: Midfielder

Senior career*
| Years | Team | Apps | (Gls) |
| 1982–1987 | Vélez Sársfield | 179 | (21) |
| 1987–1989 | Millonarios | | |
| 1989–1990 | Racing Club | | |
| 1990–1991 | Millonarios | | |
| 1991 | Quilmes | 17 | (0) |
| 1992 | Deportivo Quito | | |
| 1993 | Chaco For Ever | | |
| 1994 | Deportivo Quito | | |
| 1995–1996 | Provincial Osorno | 49 | (8) |

International career
| 1983 | Argentina U20 | 6 | (1) |

Managerial career
- 2004: Boyacá Chicó (Assistant)
- 2005: Boyacá Chicó
- 2007–2008: Millonarios
- 2008: Provincial Osorno
- * Club domestic league appearances and goals as of 10 January 2008

Mario Alberto Vanemerak (born October 21, 1963, in Firmat) is an Argentine football manager and former footballer.

In his club career that started in 1982, Vanemerak played for Vélez Sársfield, Millonarios, Racing Club, Quilmes, Deportivo Quito and Provincial Osorno.

Mario was a midfielder emerged from the divisions Vélez Sársfield. He made his debut in the first team of Vélez Sársfield in the year 1982 with only 19 years old. Between 1982 and 1987, Vanemerak played 175 games and made 20 goals. In the 1987 Vanemerak was transferred to Millonarios in Colombia. In Millonarios Vanemerak won the Championship in 1987 and 1988.

== Honours ==
Millonarios

- Categoría Primera A:1987, 1988

Argentina Youth

- South American Games: 1982
