= 2021 South American U-20 Championship =

CONMEBOL Sudamericano Sub-20 Venezuela 2021

Tournament details
- Host country: Venezuela
- Dates: Cancelled
- Teams: 10 (from 1 confederation)
- Venues: 2 (in 2 host cities)

The 2021 South American U-20 Championship was originally going be the 30th edition of the South American U-20 Championship (Spanish: CONMEBOL Sudamericano Sub-20, Portuguese: CONMEBOL Sul-Americano Sub-20), the biennial international youth football championship organised by CONMEBOL for the men's under-20 national teams of South America. It was scheduled to be held in Colombia between 2 and 27 February 2021, before its suspension and subsequent cancellation due to the COVID-19 pandemic.

On 22 December 2020 CONMEBOL announced that the tournament would be rescheduled to the second half of 2021 if FIFA decided to cancel the 2021 FIFA U-20 World Cup, which was confirmed two days later. On 28 December 2020, CONMEBOL confirmed the rescheduling of the tournament, despite the fact that the Colombian Football Federation had announced its cancellation. On 16 April 2021, CONMEBOL chose to relocate the tournament to Venezuela while Colombia would instead host the 2023 edition. Eventually, CONMEBOL decided to cancel the tournament during a meeting of its council held on 3 August 2021.

As the 2021 FIFA U-20 World Cup was canceled due to the COVID-19 pandemic, this tournament would not have served as qualifier for any FIFA U-20 World Cup. Originally the top four teams would have qualified as the CONMEBOL representatives.

Ecuador would be the defending champions.

== Teams ==
All ten CONMEBOL member national teams were eligible to enter the tournament.

Team	Appearance	Previous best performance
Argentina	28th	Champions (5 times, most recent 2015)
Bolivia	25th	Fourth place (2 times, most recent 1983)
Brazil	29th	Champions (11 times, most recent 2011)
Chile	30th	Runners-up (1 time, 1975)
Colombia	28th	Champions (3 times, most recent 2013)
Ecuador (holders)	25th	Champions (1 time, 2019)
Paraguay	28th	Champions (1 time, 1971)
Peru	29th	Third place (2 times, most recent 1971)
Uruguay	29th	Champions (8 times, most recent 2017)
Venezuela (hosts)	26th	Third place (2 times, most recent 2017)

== Venues ==
Colombia was originally chosen as host country of the tournament during the CONMEBOL Council virtual meeting held on 6 August 2020, with Armenia, Pereira, Manizales and Ibagué as the potential host cities. After the postponement and rescheduling of the tournament, Venezuela was named as the new host country during the CONMEBOL Council meeting held on 16 April 2021, with Valencia and Puerto Cabello as the host cities.

== Squads ==
Players born on or after 1 January 2001 are eligible to compete.
