= 2019 South American U-20 Championship =

CONMEBOL Sudamericano Sub-20 “Juventud de America” Chile 2019
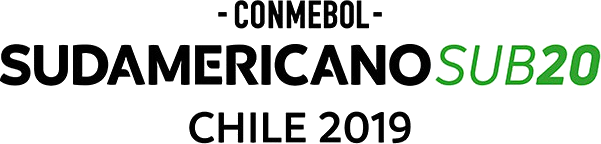

Tournament details
- Host country: Chile
- Dates: 17 January – 10 February
- Teams: 10 (from 1 confederation)
- Venue: 3 (in 3 host cities)

Final positions
- Champions: Ecuador (1st title)
- Runners-up: Argentina
- Third place: Uruguay
- Fourth place: Colombia

Tournament statistics
- Matches played: 35
- Goals scored: 60 (1.71 per match)
- Top scorer: (Ecuador) Leonardo Campana (6 goals)

The 2019 South American U-20 Championship was the 29th edition of the South American U-20 Championship (Spanish: CONMEBOL Sudamericano Sub-20, Portuguese: CONMEBOL Sul-Americano Sub-20), the biennial international youth football championship organised by CONMEBOL for the men's under-20 national teams of South America. It was held in Chile between 17 January and 10 February 2019.

The top four teams qualified for the 2019 FIFA U-20 World Cup in Poland as the CONMEBOL representatives. The top three teams qualified for the 2019 Pan American Games men's football tournament, in addition to Peru who had automatically qualified as hosts. However, due to the re-introduction of the CONMEBOL Pre-Olympic Tournament in 2020, the tournament was not used for qualifying for the 2020 Summer Olympics men's football tournament.

Ecuador won their first title. Argentina finished second, defending champions Uruguay finished third, while Colombia finished fourth.

== Teams ==
All ten CONMEBOL member national teams entered the tournament.

Team	Appearance	Previous best performance
Argentina	27th	Champions (5 times, most recent 2015)
Bolivia	24th	Fourth place (2 times, most recent 1983)
Brazil	28th	Champions (11 times, most recent 2011)
Chile (hosts)	29th	Runners-up (1 time, 1975)
Colombia	27th	Champions (3 times, most recent 2013)
Ecuador	24th	Runners-up (1 time, 2017)
Paraguay	27th	Champions (1 time, 1971)
Peru	28th	Third place (2 times, most recent 1971)
Uruguay (holders)	28th	Champions (8 times, most recent 2017)
Venezuela	25th	Third place (2 times, most recent 2017)

== Venues ==
According to ANFP sources, Chile was named as host country of the tournament during the CONMEBOL Executive Committee meeting held on 12 May 2015 at CONMEBOL headquarters in Luque, Paraguay. Estadio El Teniente in Rancagua, Estadio La Granja in Curicó and Estadio Fiscal in Talca were the venues chosen by CONMEBOL and ANFP.

Rancagua	Curicó	Talca
Estadio El Teniente	Estadio La Granja	Estadio Fiscal
Capacity: 13,489	Capacity: 8,278	Capacity: 16,000
34.177764°S 70.737719°W	34.974444°S 71.229722°W	35.419722°S 71.673889°W

== Squads ==
Players born on or after 1 January 1999 were eligible to compete. Each team registered a squad of 23 players (three of whom must be goalkeepers).

== Match officials ==
The referees were:

- (Argentina) Fernando Rapallini
  - Assistant Referee 1: Ezequiel Brailovsky
  - Assistant Referee 2: Gabriel Chade
- (Bolivia) Gery Vargas
  - Assistant Referee 1: José Antelo
  - Assistant Referee 2: Edwar Saavedra
- (Brazil) Raphael Claus
  - Assistant Referee 1: Kléber Lúcio Gil
  - Assistant Referee 2: Bruno Pires
- (Chile) Piero Maza
  - Assistant Referee 1: Claudio Ríos
  - Assistant Referee 2: José Retamal
- (Colombia) Nicolás Gallo
  - Assistant Referee 1: John Alexander León
  - Assistant Referee 2: Wílmar Navarro
- (Ecuador) Carlos Orbe
  - Assistant Referee 1: Juan Carlos Macías
  - Assistant Referee 2: Ricardo Barén
- (Paraguay) Mario Díaz de Vivar
  - Assistant Referee 1: Roberto Cañete
  - Assistant Referee 2: Darío Gaona
- (Peru) Joel Alarcón
  - Assistant Referee 1: Víctor Ráez
  - Assistant Referee 2: Michael Orué
- (Uruguay) Leodán González
  - Assistant Referee 1: Richard Trinidad
  - Assistant Referee 2: Carlos Barreiro
- (Venezuela) Alexis Herrera
  - Assistant Referee 1: Carlos Alexander López
  - Assistant Referee 2: Jorge Urrego

Support Referees

- (Argentina) Facundo Tello (First stage)
- (Bolivia) Ivo Méndez (Final stage)
- (Chile) Cristian Garay
  - Assistant Referee: Claudio Urrutia (Final stage)
  - Assistant Referee: Alejandro Molina (Final stage)
- (Paraguay) Arnaldo Samaniego (Final stage)
- (Peru) Diego Haro (Final stage)

== Draw ==
The draw of the tournament was held on 6 November 2018, 14:15 CLST (UTC−3), at the Teatro Municipal de Rancagua in Rancagua. The ten teams were drawn into two groups of five. The hosts Chile and the defending champions Uruguay were seeded into Group A and Group B respectively and assigned to position 1 in their group, while the remaining teams were placed into four "pairing pots" according to their results in the 2017 South American U-20 Championship (shown in brackets).

Seeded	Pot 1	Pot 2	Pot 3	Pot 4
Chile (9) (Hosts, assigned to A1); Uruguay (1) (Title holders, assigned to B1)	Ecuador (2); Venezuela (3)	Argentina (4); Brazil (5)	Colombia (6); Paraguay (7)	Bolivia (8); Peru (10)

== First stage ==
The top three teams in each group advanced to the final stage.

All times local, CLST (UTC−3).

=== Group A ===
Pos	Team	Pld	W	D	L	GF	GA	GD	Pts	Qualification
1	Venezuela	4	3	0	1	5	3	+2	9	Final stage
2	Brazil	4	2	1	1	3	2	+1	7	Final stage
3	Colombia	4	2	1	1	2	1	+1	7	Final stage
4	Chile (H)	4	1	1	2	3	4	−1	4	
5	Bolivia	4	0	1	3	1	4	−3	1	

Source: CONMEBOL
(H) Hosts
17 January 2019
17:10

Venezuela	1–0	Colombia
Sosa 68'	Report

Estadio El Teniente, Rancagua
Referee: Fernando Rapallini (Argentina)
17 January 2019
19:30

Chile	1–1	Bolivia
L. Alarcón 61'	Report	Vaca 5'

Estadio El Teniente, Rancagua
Referee: Leodán González (Uruguay)

19 January 2019
17:10

Colombia	0–0	Brazil
	Report

Estadio El Teniente, Rancagua
Referee: Leodán González (Uruguay)
19 January 2019
19:30

Chile	1–2	Venezuela
T. Alarcón 3' (pen.)	Report	Vargas 8'; Yriarte 50'

Estadio El Teniente, Rancagua
Referee: Mario Díaz de Vivar (Paraguay)

21 January 2019
17:10

Colombia	1–0	Bolivia
Angulo 62'	Report

Estadio El Teniente, Rancagua
Referee: Joel Alarcón (Peru)
21 January 2019
19:30

Brazil	2–1	Venezuela
Rodrygo 39', 80'	Report	Sosa 90'

Estadio El Teniente, Rancagua
Referee: Facundo Tello (Argentina)

23 January 2019
17:10

Bolivia	0–1	Venezuela
	Report	Vargas 19'

Estadio El Teniente, Rancagua
Referee: Carlos Orbe (Ecuador)
23 January 2019
19:30

Chile	1–0	Brazil
Morales 40'	Report

Estadio El Teniente, Rancagua
Referee: Leodán González (Uruguay)

25 January 2019
17:10

Brazil	1–0	Bolivia
Lincoln 25' (pen.)	Report

Estadio El Teniente, Rancagua
Referee: Facundo Tello (Argentina)
25 January 2019
19:30

Chile	0–1	Colombia
	Report	Cuesta 90+5'

Estadio El Teniente, Rancagua
Referee: Mario Díaz de Vivar (Paraguay)

=== Group B ===
Pos	Team	Pld	W	D	L	GF	GA	GD	Pts	Qualification
1	Ecuador	4	3	0	1	8	4	+4	9	Final stage
2	Argentina	4	2	1	1	3	2	+1	7	Final stage
3	Uruguay	4	2	0	2	4	3	+1	6	Final stage
4	Paraguay	4	1	1	2	2	5	−3	4	
5	Peru	4	1	0	3	2	5	−3	3	

Source: CONMEBOL
18 January 2019
17:10

Ecuador	3–0	Paraguay
Rezabala 9', 44'; Alvarado 57' (pen.)	Report

Estadio Fiscal, Talca
Referee: Gery Vargas (Bolivia)
18 January 2019
19:30

Uruguay	0–1	Peru
	Report	Pacheco 52' (pen.)

Estadio Fiscal, Talca
Referee: Nicolás Gallo (Colombia)

20 January 2019
17:10

Paraguay	1–1	Argentina
Ñamandú 45'	Report	Romero 29'

Estadio La Granja, Curicó
Referee: Alexis Herrera (Venezuela)
20 January 2019
19:30

Uruguay	3–1	Ecuador
Dávila 30', 45+3'; Schiappacasse 90+3'	Report	Campana 34'

Estadio La Granja, Curicó
Referee: Raphael Claus (Brazil)

22 January 2019
17:10

Argentina	0–1	Ecuador
	Report	Alvarado 54'

Estadio Fiscal, Talca
Referee: Gery Vargas (Bolivia)
22 January 2019
19:30

Paraguay	1–0	Peru
Ojeda 52'	Report

Estadio Fiscal, Talca
Referee: Piero Maza (Chile)

24 January 2019
17:10

Peru	1–3	Ecuador
Mora 24'	Report	Rezabala 8'; Alvarado 18'; Campana 58'

Estadio La Granja, Curicó
Referee: Raphael Claus (Brazil)
24 January 2019
20:45

Uruguay	0–1	Argentina
	Report	Maroni 67'

Estadio La Granja, Curicó
Referee: Alexis Herrera (Venezuela)

26 January 2019
17:10

Argentina	1–0	Peru
Romero 90+4' (pen.)	Report

Estadio Fiscal, Talca
Referee: Piero Maza (Chile)
26 January 2019
19:30

Uruguay	1–0	Paraguay
Schiappacasse 28'	Report

Estadio Fiscal, Talca
Referee: Raphael Claus (Brazil)

== Final stage ==
Pos	Team	Pld	W	D	L	GF	GA	GD	Pts	Qualification
1	Ecuador (C)	5	3	1	1	6	2	+4	10	2019 FIFA U-20 World Cup & 2019 Pan American Games
2	Argentina	5	3	0	2	7	4	+3	9	2019 FIFA U-20 World Cup & 2019 Pan American Games
3	Uruguay	5	2	2	1	6	5	+1	8	2019 FIFA U-20 World Cup & 2019 Pan American Games
4	Colombia	5	1	2	2	2	2	0	5	2019 FIFA U-20 World Cup
5	Brazil	5	1	2	2	3	5	−2	5	
6	Venezuela	5	1	1	3	3	9	−6	4	

Source: CONMEBOL
(C) Champions
29 January 2019
17:30

Brazil	0–0	Colombia
	Report

Estadio El Teniente, Rancagua
Referee: Joel Alarcón (Peru)
29 January 2019
19:50

Ecuador	2–1	Argentina
Campana 37'; Cifuentes 73'	Report	Almada 26'

Estadio El Teniente, Rancagua
Referee: Arnaldo Samaniego (Paraguay)
29 January 2019
22:10

Venezuela	1–1	Uruguay
Makoun 8'	Report	Acevedo 76'

Estadio El Teniente, Rancagua
Referee: Piero Maza (Chile)

1 February 2019
17:30

Argentina	1–0	Colombia
Álvarez 42'	Report

Estadio El Teniente, Rancagua
Referee: Diego Haro (Peru)
1 February 2019
19:50

Ecuador	0–1	Uruguay
	Report	Batista 61' (pen.)

Estadio El Teniente, Rancagua
Referee: Gery Vargas (Bolivia)
1 February 2019
22:10

Venezuela	2–0	Brazil
Hurtado 22', 87'	Report

Estadio El Teniente, Rancagua
Referee: Mario Díaz de Vivar (Paraguay)

4 February 2019
17:30

Brazil	2–3	Uruguay
Lincoln 68'; Luan Cândido 83'	Report	Gómez 58'; Schiappacasse 65' (pen.); García 90+1'

Estadio El Teniente, Rancagua
Referee: Diego Haro (Peru)
4 February 2019
19:50

Ecuador	1–0	Colombia
Campana 90+4'	Report

Estadio El Teniente, Rancagua
Referee: Piero Maza (Chile)
4 February 2019
22:10

Venezuela	0–3	Argentina
	Report	Gaich 58', 64', 82'

Estadio El Teniente, Rancagua
Referee: Gery Vargas (Bolivia)

7 February 2019
17:30

Argentina	2–1	Uruguay
Moreno 24'; Maroni 46'	Report	Schiappacasse 90+3'

Estadio El Teniente, Rancagua
Referee: Arnaldo Samaniego (Paraguay)
7 February 2019
19:50

Ecuador	0–0	Brazil
	Report

Estadio El Teniente, Rancagua
Referee: Ivo Méndez (Bolivia)
7 February 2019
22:10

Venezuela	0–2	Colombia
	Report	Reyes 26'; Angulo 56'

Estadio El Teniente, Rancagua
Referee: Mario Díaz de Vivar (Paraguay)

10 February 2019
17:30

Colombia	0–0	Uruguay
	Report

Estadio El Teniente, Rancagua
Referee: Diego Haro (Peru)
10 February 2019
19:50

Venezuela	0–3	Ecuador
	Report	Campana 2' (pen.), 31'; Segura 90'

Estadio El Teniente, Rancagua
Referee: Arnaldo Samaniego (Paraguay)
10 February 2019
22:10

Brazil	1–0	Argentina
Lincoln 39' (pen.)	Report

Estadio El Teniente, Rancagua
Referee: Piero Maza (Chile)

== Winners ==
2019 South American U-20 champions

Ecuador
1st title

== Goalscorers ==
There were 60 goals scored in 35 matches, for an average of 1.71 goals per match.

6 goals

- (Ecuador) Leonardo Campana

4 goals

- (Uruguay) Nicolás Schiappacasse

3 goals

- (Argentina) Adolfo Gaich
- (Brazil) Lincoln
- (Ecuador) Alexander Alvarado
- (Ecuador) Jordan Rezabala

2 goals

- (Argentina) Gonzalo Maroni
- (Argentina) Maximiliano Romero
- (Brazil) Rodrygo
- (Colombia) Iván Angulo
- (Uruguay) Agustín Dávila
- (Venezuela) Jan Carlos Hurtado
- (Venezuela) Samuel Sosa
- (Venezuela) Jesús Vargas

1 goal

- (Argentina) Thiago Almada
- (Argentina) Julián Álvarez
- (Argentina) Aníbal Moreno
- (Bolivia) Ramiro Vaca
- (Brazil) Luan Cândido
- (Chile) Lucas Alarcón
- (Chile) Tomás Alarcón
- (Chile) Iván Morales
- (Colombia) Carlos Cuesta
- (Colombia) Andrés Reyes
- (Ecuador) José Cifuentes
- (Ecuador) Daniel Segura
- (Paraguay) Marcelino Ñamandú
- (Paraguay) Braian Ojeda
- (Peru) Oslimg Mora
- (Peru) Fernando Pacheco
- (Uruguay) Nicolás Acevedo
- (Uruguay) Facundo Batista
- (Uruguay) Pablo García
- (Uruguay) Emiliano Gómez
- (Venezuela) Christian Makoun
- (Venezuela) Jorge Yriarte

== Tournament best XI ==
The best XI team was a squad consisting of the eleven most impressive players at the tournament.

Pos.	Player
GK	(Colombia) Kevin Mier
DF	(Ecuador) Diego Palacios
DF	(Ecuador) Jackson Porozo
DF	(Uruguay) Maximiliano Araújo
MF	(Argentina) Santiago Sosa
MF	(Brazil) Marcos Bahia
MF	(Ecuador) Gonzalo Plata
MF	(Venezuela) Samuel Sosa
FW	(Argentina) Julián Álvarez
FW	(Ecuador) Leonardo Campana
FW	(Uruguay) Nicolás Schiappacasse

== Qualification for international tournaments ==
=== Qualified teams for FIFA U-20 World Cup ===
The following four teams from CONMEBOL qualified for the 2019 FIFA U-20 World Cup.

Team	Qualified on	Previous appearances in FIFA U-20 World Cup^{1}
Argentina	7 February 2019	15 (**1979**, 1981, 1983, 1989, 1991, **1995**, **1997**, 1999, **2001**, 2003, **2005**, **2007**, 2011, 2015, 2017)
Uruguay	10 February 2019	14 (1977, 1979, 1981, 1983, 1991, 1993, 1997, 1999, 2007, 2009, 2011, 2013, 2015, 2017)
Ecuador	10 February 2019	3 (2001, 2011, 2017)
Colombia	10 February 2019	9 (1985, 1987, 1989, 1993, 2003, 2005, 2011, 2013, 2015)

^{1} Bold indicates champions for that year. Italic indicates hosts for that year.

=== Qualified teams for Pan American Games ===
The following four teams from CONMEBOL qualified for the 2019 Pan American Games men's football tournament, including Peru which qualified as hosts.

Team	Qualified on	Previous appearances in Pan American Games^{2}
Peru	11 October 2013	1 (2015)
Argentina	7 February 2019	14 (**1951**, **1955**, **1959**, 1963, 1967, **1971**, 1975, 1979, 1983, 1987, **1995**, **2003**, 2007, 2011)
Uruguay	10 February 2019	6 (1963, 1975, **1983**, 1999, 2011, **2015**)
Ecuador	10 February 2019	3 (1995, **2007**, 2011)

^{2} Bold indicates champions for that year. Italic indicates hosts for that year.

== Broadcasting rights ==
=== South America ===
The tournament was broadcast by the following TV companies in South America.

Country	Broadcaster	Ref.
Argentina	TyC Sports	
Bolivia	Tigo Sport	
Brazil	SporTV	
Chile	Canal 13 (only Chile matches), Canal del Fútbol (all matches)	
Colombia	Caracol Televisión (only Colombia matches), Caracol HD2 (rest of matches)	
Ecuador	CNT Sports	
Paraguay	RPC, Unicanal	
Peru	Movistar Deportes (all matches), Latina Televisión (only Peru matches)	
Uruguay	VTV (only Uruguay matches), VeraTV (all matches)	
Venezuela	La Tele Tuya	
