= Ecuador national under-20 football team =

Ecuador U-20
- Nickname: 'La Tricolor'
- Association: Ecuadorian Football Federation (Federación Ecuatoriana de Fútbol)
- Confederation: CONMEBOL (South America)
- Head coach: Gonzalo Ferrea
- Captain: José Cifuente
- Home stadium: Estadio Rodrigo Paz Delgado; Quito, Ecuador
- FIFA code: ECU
First colours	Second colours

FIFA U-20 World Cup
- Appearances: 5 (first in 2001)
- Best result: Third place (2019)

South American Youth Football Championship
- Appearances: 26 (first in 1954)
- Best result: Champions (2019)

The Ecuadorian national under-20 football team represents Ecuador in international under-20 football competitions and is controlled by the Ecuadorian Football Federation.

== History ==
The development of Ecuador's national football team has historically relied on the emergence of talented youth players. At the 2001 FIFA World Youth Championship, several members of the Ecuador U-20 team, including Segundo Castillo, Félix Borja, and Franklin Salas, later became established internationals. Ecuador qualified for the FIFA U-20 World Cup again in 2011, marking the country's first appearance in the tournament since 2001.

In the 2019 FIFA U-20 World Cup, the U-20 team achieved Ecuador's best participation in a FIFA World Cup of any category, obtaining third place after defeating Italy in the third place match.

== Competitive record ==
=== FIFA U-20 World Cup ===
Year	Round	GP	W	D	L	GS	GA
(Tunisia) 1977	Did not qualify						
(Japan) 1979	Did not qualify						
(Australia) 1981	Did not qualify						
(Mexico) 1983	Did not qualify						
(Soviet Union) 1985	Did not qualify						
(Chile) 1987	Did not qualify						
(Saudi Arabia) 1989	Did not qualify						
(Portugal) 1991	Did not qualify						
(Australia) 1993	Did not qualify						
(Qatar) 1995	Did not qualify						
(Malaysia) 1997	Did not qualify						
(Nigeria) 1999	Did not qualify						
(Argentina) 2001	Round of 16	4	1	1	2	3	4
(United Arab Emirates) 2003	Did not qualify						
(Netherlands) 2005	Did not qualify						
(Canada) 2007	Did not qualify						
(Egypt) 2009	Did not qualify						
(Colombia) 2011	Round of 16	4	1	1	2	4	4
(Turkey) 2013	Did not qualify						
(New Zealand) 2015	Did not qualify						
(South Korea) 2017	Group stage	3	0	2	1	4	5
(Poland) 2019	Third place	7	4	1	2	8	5
(Indonesia) ~~2021~~	Cancelled due to the COVID-19 pandemic						
(Argentina) 2023	Round of 16	4	2	0	2	13	5
(Chile) 2025	Did not qualify						
(Azerbaijan) (Uzbekistan) 2027	To be determined						
(Armenia) (Georgia (country)) 2029	To be determined						
Total	Third place	22	8	5	9	32	23

=== CONMEBOL Sub20 ===
Year	Round	GP	W	D	L	GS	GA
(Venezuela) 1954	First round	3	0	1	2	2	6
(Chile) 1958	Did not enter						
(Colombia) 1964	Did not enter						
(Paraguay) 1967	First round	4	1	0	3	4	7
(Paraguay) 1971	Did not enter						
(Chile) 1974	First round	3	0	0	3	0	5
(Peru) 1975	Did not enter						
(Venezuela) 1977	Did not enter						
(Uruguay) 1979	First round	3	0	0	3	0	12
(Ecuador) 1981	First round	4	1	2	1	7	6
(Bolivia) 1983	First round	4	1	0	6	3	10
(Paraguay) 1985	First round	4	1	1	2	5	7
(Colombia) 1987	First round	3	1	1	1	2	3
(Argentina) 1988	First round	4	1	1	2	3	11
(Venezuela) 1991	First round	4	1	2	1	6	6
(Colombia) 1992	Fourth place	6	1	2	3	6	9
(Bolivia) 1995	Fourth place	7	3	1	3	8	10
(Chile) 1997	First round	4	0	1	3	1	4
(Argentina) 1999	First round	4	0	0	4	3	9
(Ecuador) 2001	First round	9	2	3	4	7	9
(Uruguay) 2003	First round	9	2	0	7	8	21
(Colombia) 2005	First round	4	0	0	4	3	20
(Paraguay) 2007	First round	4	1	1	2	5	5
(Venezuela) 2009	First round	4	1	3	0	4	3
(Peru) 2011	Fourth place	9	4	3	2	8	5
(Argentina) 2013	Final round	9	1	2	6	9	16
(Uruguay) 2015	Final round	4	2	0	2	9	8
(Ecuador) 2017	Runner-up	9	4	2	3	18	14
(Chile) 2019	Champion	9	6	1	2	14	6
(Venezuela) ~~2021~~	Cancelled due to the COVID-19 pandemic						
(Colombia) 2023	Fourth place	9	2	3	4	8	11
(Venezuela) 2025	First round	4	1	1	2	4	5

== Current squad ==
Ecuador's squad for the FIFA U-20 World Cup Argentina 2023

No.	Pos.	Player	Date of birth (age)	Club
1	GK	Cristhian Loor	9 March 2006 (aged 18)	(Ecuadorian Football Federation) Independiente del Valle
3	DF	Deinner Ordóñez	29 October 2009 (aged 15)	(Ecuadorian Football Federation) Independiente del Valle
4	DF	Davis Bautista	16 February 2005 (aged 19)	(German Football Association) Eintracht Frankfurt
5	MF	Ronny Borja	10 June 2005 (aged 19)	(Ecuadorian Football Federation) Emelec
6	DF	Elkin Ruiz	27 May 2006 (aged 18)	(Ecuadorian Football Federation) Independiente del Valle
7	MF	Keny Arroyo	14 February 2006 (aged 18)	(Ecuadorian Football Federation) Independiente del Valle
8	MF	Jeremy Arévalo	19 March 2005 (aged 19)	(Royal Spanish Football Federation) Racing Santander
9	FW	Michael Bermúdez	13 January 2006 (aged 19)	(Football Association of Serbia) OFK Beograd
10	MF	Kendry Páez	4 May 2007 (aged 17)	(Ecuadorian Football Federation) Independiente del Valle
11	FW	Allen Obando	13 June 2006 (aged 18)	(Ecuadorian Football Federation) Barcelona
12	GK	Jhafets Reyes	16 September 2006 (aged 18)	(Royal Spanish Football Federation) Cartagena
13	DF	Fricio Caicedo	17 April 2008 (aged 16)	(Ecuadorian Football Federation) LDU Quito
14	DF	Maikel Caicedo	12 March 2005 (aged 19)	(Ecuadorian Football Federation) LDU Quito
15	MF	Juan Sebastián Rodríguez	27 March 2006 (aged 18)	(Ecuadorian Football Federation) LDU Quito
16	MF	Justin Lerma	5 May 2008 (aged 16)	(Ecuadorian Football Federation) Independiente del Valle
17	FW	Bruno Caicedo	15 January 2005 (aged 20)	(Canadian Soccer Association) Vancouver Whitecaps FC
18	MF	Dary García	24 March 2005 (aged 19)	(Ecuadorian Football Federation) Independiente del Valle
19	FW	Elián Caicedo	6 March 2005 (aged 19)	(Ecuadorian Football Federation) Mushuc Runa
20	MF	Elkin Muñoz	29 June 2005 (aged 19)	(Ecuadorian Football Federation) Emelec
21	MF	Gipson Preciado	4 June 2005 (aged 19)	(Ecuadorian Football Federation) Independiente Juniors
22	GK	Miguel Peralta	26 April 2008 (aged 16)	(Ecuadorian Football Federation) Independiente del Valle
23	DF	Luis Moreno	28 February 2005 (aged 19)	(Ecuadorian Football Federation) Universidad Católica

== Head-to-head record ==
The following table shows Ecuador's head-to-head record in the FIFA U-20 World Cup.

Opponent	Pld	W	D	L	GF	GA	GD	Win %
Australia	1	0	1	0	1	1	+0	0.00
Costa Rica	2	1	0	1	3	1	+2	50.00
Ethiopia	1	1	0	0	2	1	+1	100.00
Fiji	1	1	0	0	9	0	+9	100.00
France	1	0	0	1	0	1	−1	0.00
Ghana	1	0	0	1	0	1	−1	0.00
Italy	2	1	0	1	1	1	+0	50.00
Japan	1	0	1	0	1	1	+0	0.00
Mexico	1	1	0	0	1	0	+1	100.00
Netherlands	1	0	1	0	1	1	+0	0.00
Saudi Arabia	1	0	0	1	1	2	−1	0.00
Senegal	1	0	1	0	0	0	+0	0.00
Slovakia	1	1	0	0	2	1	+1	100.00
South Korea	2	0	0	2	2	4	−2	0.00
Spain	1	0	0	1	0	2	−2	0.00
United States	3	1	1	1	5	5	+0	33.33
Uruguay	1	1	0	0	3	1	+2	100.00
Total	22	8	5	9	32	23	+9	36.36

== Honours ==
- FIFA U-20 World Cup
  - Third Place (1): 2019
- CONMEBOL Sub20
  - Champions (1): 2019
  - Runners-up (1): 2017
- South American Games
  - Silver medal (4): 1978, 1982, 1990, 2010
- Bolivarian Games
  - Gold medal (1): 1985

Friendly

- L'Alcúdia International Football Tournament
  - Champions (1) 2010

== See also ==
- Ecuador national football team
