= Venezuela national under-20 football team =

National association football team

Venezuela Under 20
- Nicknames: La Vinotinto (The Burgundy); Los Llaneros (The Plainsmen)
- Association: Venezuelan Football Federation (Federación Venezolana de Fútbol)
- Confederation: CONMEBOL (South America)
- Head coach: Juan Domingo Tolisano
- Captain: Renné Rivas
- Home stadium: Estadio José Antonio Anzoátegui; Puerto La Cruz
- FIFA code: VEN
First colours	Second colours

Biggest win
- 8-0 Vs. Tahiti in 2009 FIFA U-20 World Cup

FIFA U-20 World Cup
- Appearances: 2 (first in 2009)
- Best result: Runners-up (2017)

CONMEBOL Sub20
- Appearances: 27 (first in 1954)
- Best result: Third place (1954, 2017)

The Venezuela national under-20 football team represents Venezuela in international men's football competitions such as the South American Youth Football Championship (CONMEBOL Sub20). The team became runners-up in the 2017 FIFA U-20 World Cup.

== 2009 South American Youth Championship ==
Venezuela was able to qualify for the 2009 FIFA U-20 World Cup after finishing fourth in the hexagonal final, beating teams such as Colombia and Argentina, champions of previous editions of the tournament.

== Competitive record ==
=== FIFA U-20 World Cup ===
Year	Round	GP	W	D*	L	GS	GA
(Tunisia) 1977	Did not qualify						
(Japan) 1979	Did not qualify						
(Australia) 1981	Did not qualify						
(Mexico) 1983	Did not qualify						
(Soviet Union) 1985	Did not qualify						
(Chile) 1987	Did not qualify						
(Saudi Arabia) 1989	Did not qualify						
(Portugal) 1991	Did not qualify						
(Australia) 1993	Did not qualify						
(Qatar) 1995	Did not qualify						
(Malaysia) 1997	Did not qualify						
(Nigeria) 1999	Did not qualify						
(Argentina) 2001	Did not qualify						
(United Arab Emirates) 2003	Did not qualify						
(Netherlands) 2005	Did not qualify						
(Canada) 2007	Did not qualify						
(Egypt) 2009	Round of 16	4	2	0	2	10	5
(Colombia) 2011	Did not qualify						
(Turkey) 2013	Did not qualify						
(New Zealand) 2015	Did not qualify						
(South Korea) 2017	Runners-up	7	5	1	1	14	3
(Poland) 2019	Did not qualify						
(Argentina) 2023	Did not qualify						
(Chile) 2025	Did not qualify						
(Azerbaijan) (Uzbekistan) 2027	To be determined						
(Armenia) (Georgia (country)) 2029	To be determined						
Total	2/26	11	7	1	3	24	8

=== CONMEBOL Sub20 ===
CONMEBOL Sub20 record
Year	Round	Position	GP	W	D*	L	GS	GA	+/–	%
(Venezuela) 1954	Third place	3rd	3	1	0	2	3	6	−3	33.33
(Chile) 1958	Group Stage	6th	5	0	2	3	6	17	−11	0.00
(Colombia) 1964	Group Stage	7th	6	0	3	3	3	6	−3	0.00
(Paraguay) 1967	Group Stage	9th	3	1	0	2	4	8	−4	33.33
(Paraguay) 1971	Group Stage	6th	4	1	2	1	7	10	−3	25.00
(Chile) 1974	Group Stage	7th	4	1	1	2	3	8	−5	25.00
(Peru) 1975	Did not participate									
(Venezuela) 1977	Group Stage	8th	4	0	2	2	1	5	−4	0.00
(Uruguay) 1979	Did not participate									
(Ecuador) 1981	Group Stage	9th	3	0	0	3	1	12	−11	0.00
(Bolivia) 1983	Group Stage	10th	4	1	0	3	2	15	−13	25.00
(Paraguay) 1985	Group Stage	10th	4	0	1	3	1	12	−11	0.00
(Colombia) 1987	Did not participate									
(Argentina) 1988	Group Stage	11th	5	0	0	5	3	12	−9	0.00
(Venezuela) 1991	Group Stage	10th	4	1	0	3	7	17	−10	25.00
(Colombia) 1992	Did not participate									
(Bolivia) 1995	Group Stage	9th	4	0	0	4	2	10	−8	0.00
(Chile) 1997	Final Round	5th	9	3	2	4	23	23	+0	33.33
(Argentina) 1999	Group Stage	7th	4	1	0	3	5	14	−9	25.00
(Ecuador) 2001	Group Stage	10th	4	0	2	2	4	7	−3	0.00
(Uruguay) 2003	Group Stage	8th	4	1	0	3	1	4	−3	25.00
(Colombia) 2005	Final Round	6th	9	1	1	7	9	17	−8	11.11
(Paraguay) 2007	Group Stage	9th	4	1	0	3	3	11	−8	25.00
(Venezuela) 2009	Final Round	4th	9	3	4	2	11	12	−1	33.33
(Peru) 2011	Group Stage	9th	4	0	3	1	4	6	−2	0.00
(Argentina) 2013	Group Stage	8th	4	1	1	2	3	4	−1	25.00
(Uruguay) 2015	Group Stage	8th	4	1	0	3	1	5	−4	25.00
(Ecuador) 2017	Final Round	3rd	9	2	5	2	9	7	+2	22.22
(Chile) 2019	Final Round	6th	9	4	1	4	11	5	+6	44.44
(Colombia) 2023	Final Round	5th	9	2	2	5	6	15	−9	22.22
(Venezuela) 2025	Group Stage	7th	4	2	0	2	6	3	+3	50.00
Total	27/31	Third Place	139	28	32	79	139	271	−132	20.14

== Current status ==
=== Recent and forthcoming matches ===
Matches from the past 12 months as well as any future scheduled matches.

May 20, 2017 2017 U-20 WC	Venezuela	2 - 0	Germany	Daejeon, South Korea
14:00 KST (UTC+9:00)	Peña 51'; Córdova 54'			Stadium: Daejeon World Cup Stadium; Attendance: 5,049; Referee: Ghead Grisha (Egypt)

May 23, 2017 2017 U-20 WC	Venezuela	7 - 0	Vanuatu	Daejeon, South Korea
17:00 KST (UTC+9:00)	Velásquez 30'; Córdova 42' 73'; Peñaranda 46'; Faríñez 56' (pen.); Hurtado 82'; Sosa 89'			Stadium: Daejeon World Cup Stadium; Referee: Kim Jong-hyeok (South Korea)

May 26, 2017 2017 U-20 WC	Mexico	0 - 1	Venezuela	Suwon, South Korea
17:00 KST (UTC+9:00)			Córdova 33'	Stadium: Suwon World Cup Stadium; Referee: Jonas Eriksson (Sweden)

May 30, 2017 2017 U-20 WC	Venezuela	1 - 0 (a.e.t.)	Japan	Daejeon, South Korea
17:00 KST (UTC+9:00)	Herrera 108'			Stadium: Daejeon World Cup Stadium; Referee: Björn Kuipers (Netherlands)

June 4, 2017 2017 U-20 WC	Venezuela	2 - 1 (a.e.t.)	United States	Jeonju, South Korea
15:00 KST (UTC+9:00)	Peñaranda 97'; N. Ferraresi 115'		Jeremy Ebobisse 117'	Stadium: Jeonju World Cup Stadium; Attendance: 2,671; Referee: Jonas Eriksson (Sweden)

June 8, 2017 2017 U-20 WC	Uruguay	1-1	Venezuela	Daejeon, South Korea
17:00 KST (UTC+9:00)		Report		Stadium: Daejeon World Cup Stadium

Win Draw Loss

== Current squad ==
The following players were selected for the 2022 Maurice Revello Tournament between 29 May – 12 June 2022.

Stats and goals correct as of 27 May 2022.

No.	Pos.	Player	Date of birth (age)	Caps	Goals	Club
	GK	Frankarlos Benítez	3 May 2004 (age 22)	0	0	(Venezuelan Football Federation) Caracas
	GK	Samuel Rodríguez	5 May 2003 (age 23)	0	0	(Royal Spanish Football Federation) Atlético Madrid
	DF	Jon Aramburu	23 July 2002 (age 24)	0	0	(Venezuelan Football Federation) Deportivo La Guaira
	DF	Luis Casiani	20 July 2001 (age 25)	0	0	(Uruguayan Football Association) Cerro Largo
	DF	Óscar Conde	6 June 2002 (age 24)	0	0	(Venezuelan Football Federation) Academia Puerto Cabello
	DF	Adrián Cova	13 February 2001 (age 25)	0	0	(Royal Spanish Football Federation) Granada
	DF	Alejandro Cova	19 May 2003 (age 23)	0	0	(Royal Spanish Football Federation) Rayo Vallecano
	DF	Andrés Ferro	2 August 2001 (age 25)	0	0	(Venezuelan Football Federation) Metropolitanos
	DF	Jesús Paz	13 May 2001 (age 25)	0	0	(Venezuelan Football Federation) Zulia
	DF	Renne Rivas	21 March 2003 (age 23)	0	0	(Venezuelan Football Federation) Caracas
	MF	Abraham Bahachille	8 March 2001 (age 25)	0	0	(Venezuelan Football Federation) Academia Puerto Cabello
	MF	Jesús Castellano	22 March 2004 (age 22)	0	0	(United States Soccer Federation) New York Red Bulls
	MF	Bryant Ortega	28 February 2003 (age 23)	0	0	(Venezuelan Football Federation) Caracas
	MF	Andrés Romero	7 March 2003 (age 23)	0	0	(Venezuelan Football Federation) Monagas
	MF	Emerson Ruíz	1 March 2003 (age 23)	0	0	(Venezuelan Football Federation) Mineros de Guayana
	MF	Telasco Segovia	2 April 2003 (age 23)	0	0	(Italian Football Federation) Sampdoria
	FW	Yerson Chacón	4 June 2003 (age 23)	0	0	(Venezuelan Football Federation) Deportivo Táchira
	FW	Jeriel De Santis	18 June 2002 (age 24)	0	0	(Portuguese Football Federation) Boavista
	FW	Matías Lacava	10 October 2002 (age 24)	0	0	(Portuguese Football Federation) Tondela
	FW	Daniel Pérez	17 January 2002 (age 24)	0	0	(Royal Belgian Football Association) Club Brugge
	FW	Manuel Sulbarán	8 October 2002 (age 24)	0	0	(Venezuelan Football Federation) Caracas

== Former squads ==
- 2009 FIFA under-20 World Cup squads - Venezuela
- 2017 FIFA under-20 World Cup squads - Venezuela

== Head-to-head record ==
The following table shows Venezuela's head-to-head record in FIFA U-20 World Cup.

Opponent	Pld	W	D	L	GF	GA	GD	Win %
England	1	0	0	1	0	1	−1	0.00
Germany	1	1	0	0	2	0	+2	100.00
Japan	1	1	0	0	1	0	+1	100.00
Mexico	1	1	0	0	1	0	+1	100.00
Nigeria	1	1	0	0	1	0	+1	100.00
Spain	1	0	0	1	0	3	−3	0.00
Tahiti	1	1	0	0	8	0	+8	100.00
United Arab Emirates	1	0	0	1	1	2	−1	0.00
United States	1	1	0	0	2	1	+1	100.00
Uruguay	1	0	1	0	1	1	+0	0.00
Vanuatu	1	1	0	0	7	0	+7	100.00
Total	11	7	1	3	24	8	+16	63.64

== Honours ==
- FIFA U-20 World Cup
  - Runners-up: 2017
- CONMEBOL Sub20
  - Third place (2): 1954, 2017
- Central American and Caribbean Games
  - Gold medal (1): 1998
  - Silver medal (3): 2006, 2014, 2018

Friendly

- L'Alcúdia International Football Tournament
  - Runners-up: 2009

== See also ==
- Venezuela national under-23 football team
- Venezuela national under-17 football team
- South American Youth Championship
- Venezuela national football team
- Venezuela national futsal team
