= 1981 South American U-20 Championship =

1981 South American Youth Championship
Tournament details
- Host country: Ecuador
- Dates: 15 February – 8 March
- Teams: 9

Final positions
- Champions: Uruguay (7th title)
- Runners-up: Brazil
- Third place: Argentina
- Fourth place: Bolivia

The South American Youth Championship 1981 was held in Guayaquil and Quito, Ecuador. It also served as qualification for the 1981 FIFA World Youth Championship.

== Teams ==
The following teams entered the tournament:

- Argentina
- Bolivia
- Brazil
- Chile
- Colombia
- Ecuador (host)
- Paraguay
- Uruguay
- Venezuela

(Peru withdrew due to the Paquisha War)

== First round ==
=== Group A ===
Teams	Pld	W	D	L	GF	GA	GD	Pts
Uruguay	4	2	1	1	8	5	+3	5
Bolivia	4	1	3	0	4	3	+1	5
Ecuador	4	1	2	1	7	6	+1	4
Paraguay	4	1	2	1	6	6	0	4
Colombia	4	0	2	2	3	8	–5	2

15 February	Colombia	1–1	Paraguay
	Uruguay	1–1	Bolivia
18 February	Bolivia	2–1	Paraguay
	Ecuador	3–1	Colombia
20 February	Bolivia	1–1	Ecuador
	Paraguay	2–1	Uruguay
22 February	Colombia	0–0	Bolivia
	Uruguay	2–1	Ecuador
25 February	Uruguay	4–1	Colombia
	Ecuador	2–2	Paraguay

=== Group B ===
Teams	Pld	W	D	L	GF	GA	GD	Pts
Brazil	3	2	1	0	7	2	+5	5
Argentina	3	2	1	0	7	2	+5	5
Chile	3	1	0	2	5	4	+1	2
Venezuela	3	0	0	3	1	12	–11	0

15 February	Argentina	3–1	Chile
17 February	Brazil	5–1	Venezuela
19 February	Argentina	3–0	Venezuela
22 February	Brazil	1–0	Chile
26 February	Chile	4–0	Venezuela
	Brazil	1–1	Argentina

== Final round ==
Teams	Pld	W	D	L	GF	GA	GD	Pts
Uruguay	3	3	0	0	9	3	+6	6
Brazil	3	1	1	1	6	3	+3	3
Argentina	3	1	0	2	4	10	–6	2
Bolivia	3	0	1	2	3	6	–3	1

1 March	Argentina	3–1	Bolivia
	Uruguay	2–1	Brazil
5 March	Brazil	4–0	Argentina
	Uruguay	2–1	Bolivia
8 March	Brazil	1–1	Bolivia
	Uruguay	5–1	Argentina

1981 South American Youth Championship

Uruguay
Seventh title

== Qualification to World Youth Championship ==
The two best performing teams qualified directly for the 1981 FIFA World Youth Championship.

- Brazil
- Uruguay

Argentina also qualified, after winning an intercontinental play-off against New Zealand and Israel. Matches were played in Buenos Aires, Argentina.

Teams	Pld	W	D	L	GF	GA	GD	Pts
Argentina	4	4	0	0	7	0	+7	8
New Zealand	4	1	1	2	2	5	–3	3
Israel	4	0	1	3	1	5	–4	1

18 March	New Zealand	0–0	Israel
20 March	Argentina	1–0	Israel
22 March	Argentina	1–0	New Zealand
25 March	Israel	1–2	New Zealand
27 March	Argentina	3–0	New Zealand
29 March	Argentina	2–0	Israel
