= 1995 South American U-20 Championship =

1995 South American Youth Championship
Tournament details
- Host country: Bolivia
- Dates: 10–29 January
- Teams: 9

Final positions
- Champions: Brazil (7th title)
- Runners-up: Argentina
- Third place: Chile
- Fourth place: Ecuador

The South American Youth Championship 1995 was held in Cochabamba, La Paz and Santa Cruz, Bolivia. It also served as qualification for the 1995 FIFA World Youth Championship.

== Teams ==
The following teams entered the tournament:

- Argentina
- Bolivia (host)
- Brazil
- Chile
- Colombia
- Ecuador
- Paraguay
- Peru
- Venezuela

(Uruguay were banned by the FIFA due to misbehaviour at the previous World Youth Championship)

== Venues ==
- Estadio Hernando Siles, La Paz
- Estadio Félix Capriles, Cochabamba
- Estadio Jesús Bermúdez, Oruro
- Estadio Ramón Tahuichi Aguilera, Santa Cruz de la Sierra

== First round ==
=== Group A ===
Teams	Pld	W	D	L	GF	GA	GD	Pts
Argentina	4	3	1	0	5	0	+5	10
Ecuador	4	3	0	1	7	2	+5	9
Bolivia	4	2	1	1	4	2	+2	7
Peru	4	1	0	3	4	7	–3	3
Venezuela	4	0	0	4	1	10	–9	0

Bolivia	2–0	Venezuela
Peru	0–2	Argentina
Ecuador	0–1	Argentina
Peru	1–2	Bolivia
Argentina	2–0	Venezuela
Peru	1–2	Ecuador
Venezuela	1–2	Peru
Bolivia	0–1	Ecuador
Ecuador	4–0	Venezuela
Argentina	0–0	Bolivia

=== Group B ===
Teams	Pld	W	D	L	GF	GA	GD	Pts
Brazil	3	2	0	1	8	4	+4	6
Chile	3	1	1	1	7	7	0	4
Colombia	3	1	1	1	4	4	0	4
Paraguay	3	0	2	1	4	8	–4	2

Brazil	5–1	Paraguay
Chile	2–3	Colombia
Chile	2–2	Paraguay
Brazil	1–0	Colombia
Colombia	1–1	Paraguay
Brazil	2–3	Chile

== Final round ==
Teams	Pld	W	D	L	GF	GA	GD	Pts
Brazil	3	3	0	0	9	0	+9	9
Argentina	3	2	0	1	5	3	+2	6
Chile	3	0	1	2	2	6	–4	1
Ecuador	3	0	1	2	1	8	–7	1

Argentina	3–1	Chile
Brazil	5–0	Ecuador
Argentina	2–0	Ecuador
Brazil	2–0	Chile
Chile	1–1	Ecuador
Brazil	2–0	Argentina

1995 South American Youth Championship

Brazil
Seventh title

== Qualification to World Youth Championship ==
The three best performing teams qualified for the 1995 FIFA World Youth Championship.

- Argentina
- Brazil
- Chile
