= 1985 South American U-20 Championship =

1985 South American Youth Championship
Tournament details
- Host country: Paraguay
- Dates: 8–30 January
- Teams: 10

Final positions
- Champions: Brazil (3rd title)
- Runners-up: Paraguay
- Third place: Colombia
- Fourth place: Uruguay

The South American Youth Championship 1985 was held in Asunción, Paraguay. It also served as qualification for the 1985 FIFA World Youth Championship.

== Teams ==
The following teams entered the tournament:

- Argentina
- Bolivia
- Brazil
- Chile
- Colombia
- Ecuador
- Paraguay (host)
- Peru
- Uruguay
- Venezuela

== First round ==
=== Group A ===
Teams	Pld	W	D	L	GF	GA	GD	Pts
Paraguay	4	3	1	0	14	2	+12	7
Uruguay	4	3	1	0	8	2	+6	7
Ecuador	4	1	1	2	5	7	–2	3
Peru	4	0	2	2	2	7	–5	2
Venezuela	4	0	1	3	1	12	–11	1

8 January	Ecuador	1–1	Peru
9 January	Paraguay	6–0	Venezuela
11 January	Uruguay	2–0	Peru
13 January	Paraguay	4–1	Ecuador
14 January	Uruguay	3–0	Venezuela
16 January	Paraguay	3–0	Peru
17 January	Uruguay	2–1	Ecuador
19 January	Peru	1–1	Venezuela
20 January	Paraguay	1–1	Uruguay
22 January	Ecuador	2–0	Venezuela

=== Group B ===
Teams	Pld	W	D	L	GF	GA	GD	Pts
Brazil	4	3	1	0	6	1	+5	7
Colombia	4	2	2	0	6	2	+4	6
Argentina	4	1	2	1	5	3	+2	4
Chile	4	0	2	2	0	4	–4	2
Bolivia	4	0	1	3	1	8	–7	1

8 January	Brazil	3–0	Bolivia
9 January	Argentina	0–0	Chile
11 January	Colombia	2–1	Bolivia
13 January	Brazil	1–0	Chile
14 January	Colombia	1–1	Argentina
16 January	Chile	0–0	Bolivia
17 January	Brazil	0–0	Colombia
19 January	Argentina	3–0	Bolivia
20 January	Colombia	3–0	Chile
22 January	Brazil	2–1	Argentina

== Final round ==
Paraguay finished second in this group based on a better performance in the first round.

Teams	Pld	W	D	L	GF	GA	GD	Pts
Brazil	3	3	0	0	5	2	+3	6
Paraguay	3	1	1	1	6	4	+2	3
Colombia	3	1	1	1	6	4	+2	3
Uruguay	3	0	0	3	2	9	–7	0

25 January	Brazil	1–0	Uruguay
	Paraguay	1–1	Colombia
27 January	Brazil	2–1	Colombia
	Paraguay	4–1	Uruguay
30 January	Brazil	2–1	Paraguay
	Colombia	4–1	Uruguay

1985 South American Youth Championship

Brazil
Third title

== Qualification to World Youth Championship ==
The three best performing teams qualified for the 1985 FIFA World Youth Championship.

- Brazil
- Colombia
- Paraguay
