= 1997 South American U-20 Championship =

1997 South American Youth Championship
Tournament details
- Host country: Chile
- Dates: 16 January – 7 February
- Teams: 10

Final positions
- Champions: Argentina (3rd title)
- Runners-up: Brazil
- Third place: Paraguay
- Fourth place: Uruguay

Tournament statistics
- Top scorer: (Brazil) Adaílton (8 goals)

The South American Youth Championship 1997 was held in Coquimbo, Iquique and La Serena, Chile. It also served as qualification for the 1997 FIFA World Youth Championship.

== Teams ==
The following teams entered the tournament:

- Argentina
- Bolivia
- Brazil
- Chile (host)
- Colombia
- Ecuador
- Paraguay
- Peru
- Uruguay
- Venezuela

== Venues ==
- Estadio Nacional Julio Martínez, Santiago
- Estadio Municipal Presidente Salvador Allende, Calama
- Estadio La Portada, La Serena
- Estadio Francisco Sánchez Rumoroso, Coquimbo
- Estadio Tierra de Campeones, Iquique

== First round ==
=== Group 1 ===
Teams	Pld	W	D	L	GF	GA	GD	Pts
Brazil	4	4	0	0	17	4	+13	12
Venezuela	4	2	1	1	9	15	–6	7
Chile	4	2	0	2	8	8	0	6
Peru	4	0	2	2	3	7	–4	2
Ecuador	4	0	1	3	1	4	–3	1

Brazil	10–2	Venezuela
Chile	3–1	Peru
Brazil	2–1	Ecuador
Chile	3–4	Venezuela
Ecuador	0–1	Venezuela
Brazil	2–0	Peru
Venezuela	2–2	Peru
Chile	1–0	Ecuador
Peru	0–0	Ecuador
Chile	1–3	Brazil

=== Group 2 ===
Teams	Pld	W	D	L	GF	GA	GD	Pts
Uruguay	4	3	1	0	7	3	+4	10
Argentina	4	2	1	1	8	5	+3	7
Paraguay	4	2	0	2	8	8	0	6
Colombia	4	1	2	1	6	8	–2	5
Bolivia	4	0	0	4	5	10	–5	0

Colombia	4–3	Bolivia
Argentina	5–2	Paraguay
Uruguay	3–1	Paraguay
Argentina	1–1	Colombia
Argentina	2–1	Bolivia
Uruguay	1–1	Colombia
Paraguay	2–0	Bolivia
Argentina	0–1	Uruguay
Colombia	0–3	Paraguay
Uruguay	2–1	Bolivia

== Final round ==
Teams	Pld	W	D	L	GF	GA	GD	Pts
Argentina	5	3	2	0	10	2	+8	11
Brazil	5	2	2	1	9	6	+3	8
Paraguay	5	2	2	1	5	6	–1	8
Uruguay	5	1	3	1	7	5	+2	6
Venezuela	5	1	1	3	7	11	–4	4
Chile	5	0	2	3	5	13	–8	2

Argentina	3–0	Venezuela
Brazil	3–0	Paraguay
Chile	2–2	Uruguay
Paraguay	2–1	Venezuela
Argentina	1–1	Uruguay
Chile	2–4	Brazil
Venezuela	0–3	Uruguay
Argentina	2–0	Brazil
Chile	0–0	Paraguay
Brazil	2–2	Venezuela
Uruguay	1–2	Paraguay
Chile	0–3	Argentina
Uruguay	0–0	Brazil
Argentina	1–1	Paraguay
Chile	1–4	Venezuela

1997 South American Youth Championship

Argentina
Second title

== Qualification to World Youth Championship ==
The four best performing teams qualified for the 1997 FIFA World Youth Championship.

- Argentina
- Brazil
- Paraguay
- Uruguay

== Broadcasting rights ==
=== Americas ===
- Chile: UCV Televisión, Universidad Católica de Chile Televisión, Megavisión and La Red (some matches); VTR, Metrópolis Intercom, Cable Express, TeleRed, Metrópolis TV Cable, TV Cable Intercom & Multicanal (all matches)
- Brazil: Rede Bandeirantes
