= 1991 South American U-20 Championship =

1991 South American Youth Championship
Tournament details
- Host country: Venezuela
- Dates: 1–17 February
- Teams: 10

Final positions
- Champions: Brazil (5th title)
- Runners-up: Argentina
- Third place: Uruguay
- Fourth place: Paraguay

The South American Youth Championship 1991 was held in Puerto Ordaz and San Cristóbal, Venezuela. It also served as qualification for the 1991 FIFA World Youth Championship.

== Teams ==
The following teams entered the tournament:

- Argentina
- Bolivia
- Brazil
- Chile
- Colombia
- Ecuador
- Paraguay
- Peru
- Uruguay
- Venezuela (host)

== First round ==
=== Group A ===
Teams	Pld	W	D	L	GF	GA	GD	Pts
Brazil	4	3	1	0	11	3	+8	7
Argentina	4	2	1	1	7	6	+1	5
Chile	4	1	1	2	7	9	–2	3
Colombia	4	1	1	2	5	10	–5	3
Bolivia	4	1	0	3	5	7	–2	2

2 February	Bolivia	3–0	Colombia
	Argentina	3–2	Chile
4 February	Brazil	3–0	Bolivia
	Colombia	1–1	Chile
6 February	Brazil	1–1	Argentina
	Chile	3–2	Bolivia
8 February	Brazil	3–1	Chile
	Colombia	3–2	Argentina
10 February	Brazil	4–1	Colombia
	Argentina	1–0	Bolivia

=== Group B ===
Teams	Pld	W	D	L	GF	GA	GD	Pts
Paraguay	4	3	0	1	14	7	+7	6
Uruguay	4	2	2	0	10	3	+7	6
Ecuador	4	1	2	1	6	6	0	4
Peru	4	0	2	2	4	8	–4	2
Venezuela	4	1	0	3	7	17	–10	2

1 February	Uruguay	3–0	Paraguay
	Venezuela	2–1	Peru
3 February	Uruguay	1–1	Peru
	Ecuador	4–3	Venezuela
5 February	Peru	0–0	Ecuador
	Paraguay	7–1	Venezuela
7 February	Paraguay	5–2	Peru
	Uruguay	1–1	Ecuador
9 February	Uruguay	5–1	Venezuela
	Paraguay	2–1	Ecuador

== Final round ==
Teams	Pld	W	D	L	GF	GA	GD	Pts
Brazil	3	1	2	0	4	2	+2	4
Argentina	3	1	2	0	5	4	+1	4
Uruguay	3	1	2	0	3	2	+1	4
Paraguay	3	0	0	3	4	8	–4	0

13 February	Brazil	0–0	Uruguay
	Argentina	3–2	Paraguay
15 February	Brazil	1–1	Argentina
	Uruguay	2–1	Paraguay
17 February	Argentina	1–1	Uruguay
	Brazil	3–1	Paraguay

1991 South American Youth Championship

Brazil
Fifth title

== Qualification to World Youth Championship ==
The three best performing teams qualified for the 1991 FIFA World Youth Championship.

- Argentina
- Brazil
- Uruguay
