= 2001 South American U-20 Championship =

2001 Sudamericano Sub-20

Tournament details
- Host country: Ecuador
- Dates: 12 January – 4 February
- Teams: 10 (from 1 confederation)
- Venue: 7 (in 7 host cities)

Final positions
- Champions: Brazil (8th title)
- Runners-up: Argentina
- Third place: Paraguay
- Fourth place: Chile

Tournament statistics
- Matches played: 35
- Top scorer(s): (Brazil) Adriano (Brazil) Ewerthon (6 goals)

The 2001 South American U-20 Championship (Sudamericana sub-20) was a football competition contested by all ten U-20 national football teams of CONMEBOL. The tournament was held in Ecuador between 12 January and 4 February 2003, it was the 20th time the competition has been held and the 2nd to take place in Ecuador. Brazil won their 8th trophy.

The teams are separated in two groups of five, and each team plays four matches in a pure round-robin stage. The three top competitors advance to a single final group of six, wherein each team plays five matches. The top four teams in the final group qualify to the 2001 FIFA World Youth Championship.

== Squads ==
For a list of all the players in the final tournament, see 2001 South American U-20 Championship squads.

The following teams entered the tournament:

- Argentina
- Bolivia
- Brazil
- Chile
- Colombia
- Ecuador (host)
- Paraguay
- Peru
- Uruguay
- Venezuela

== First group stage ==
When teams finish level of points, the final order determined according to:

1. superior goal difference in all matches
2. greater number of goals scored in all group matches
3. better result in matches between tied teams
4. drawing of lots

All match times are in local Ecuador time (UTC−05:00).

=== Group A ===
Team	Pts	Pld	W	D	L	GF	GA
Paraguay	8	4	2	2	0	6	3
Brazil	7	4	2	1	1	6	3
Ecuador	5	4	1	2	1	3	2
Peru	4	4	1	1	2	5	9
Venezuela	2	4	0	2	2	4	7

==== Results ====
12 January
15:00

Brazil	4–1	Peru

Latacunga
13 January
19:00

Ecuador	0–0	Venezuela

Riobamba

15 January
18:30

Paraguay	1–0	Brazil

Ambato
15 January
20:40

Peru	0–2	Ecuador

Ambato

17 January
18:00

Venezuela	2–3	Peru

Riobamba
17 January
20:10

Ecuador	1–1	Paraguay

Riobamba

19 January
18:00

Peru	1–1	Paraguay

Riobamba
19 January
20:10

Brazil	1–1	Venezuela

Riobamba

21 January
10:00

Venezuela	1–3	Paraguay

Riobamba
21 January
12:10

Ecuador	0–1	Brazil

Riobamba

=== Group B ===
Teams	Pld	W	D	L	GF	GA	GD	Pts
Argentina	4	3	1	0	8	2	+6	10
Chile	4	2	0	2	6	5	+1	6
Colombia	4	2	0	2	4	6	−2	6
Uruguay	4	1	1	2	4	6	−2	4
Bolivia	4	1	0	3	4	7	−3	3

14 January	Uruguay	0–1	Colombia
	Bolivia	0–2	Argentina
16 January	Uruguay	2–1	Chile
	Argentina	4–1	Colombia
18 January	Colombia	1–0	Bolivia
	Argentina	1–0	Chile
20 January	Chile	2–1	Colombia
	Uruguay	1–3	Bolivia
22 January	Chile	3–1	Bolivia
	Argentina	1–1	Uruguay

== Final round ==
Teams	Pld	W	D	L	GF	GA	GD	Pts
Brazil	5	4	1	0	15	2	+13	13
Argentina	5	2	2	1	5	4	+1	8
Paraguay	5	1	3	1	7	6	+1	6
Chile	5	1	2	2	5	12	−7	5
Ecuador	5	1	1	3	4	7	−3	4
Colombia	5	1	1	3	3	8	−5	4

24 January	Ecuador	0–1	Argentina
	Paraguay	3–1	Colombia
	Brazil	6–0	Chile
26 January	Brazil	4–1	Colombia
	Paraguay	1–1	Ecuador
	Argentina	2–2	Chile
28 January	Ecuador	0–1	Colombia
	Paraguay	1–2	Chile
	Brazil	1–0	Argentina
31 January	Paraguay	1–1	Brazil
	Argentina	1–0	Colombia
	Chile	1–3	Ecuador
4 February	Paraguay	1–1	Argentina
	Brazil	3–0	Ecuador
	Colombia	0–0	Chile

2001 South American Youth Championship

Brazil
Eighth title

== Qualification to World Youth Championship ==
Excluding Argentina, who had qualified automatically as host, the four best performing teams qualified for the 2001 FIFA World Youth Championship.

- Brazil
- Chile
- Ecuador
- Paraguay
