= Luis Musrri =

Chilean footballer (born 1969)

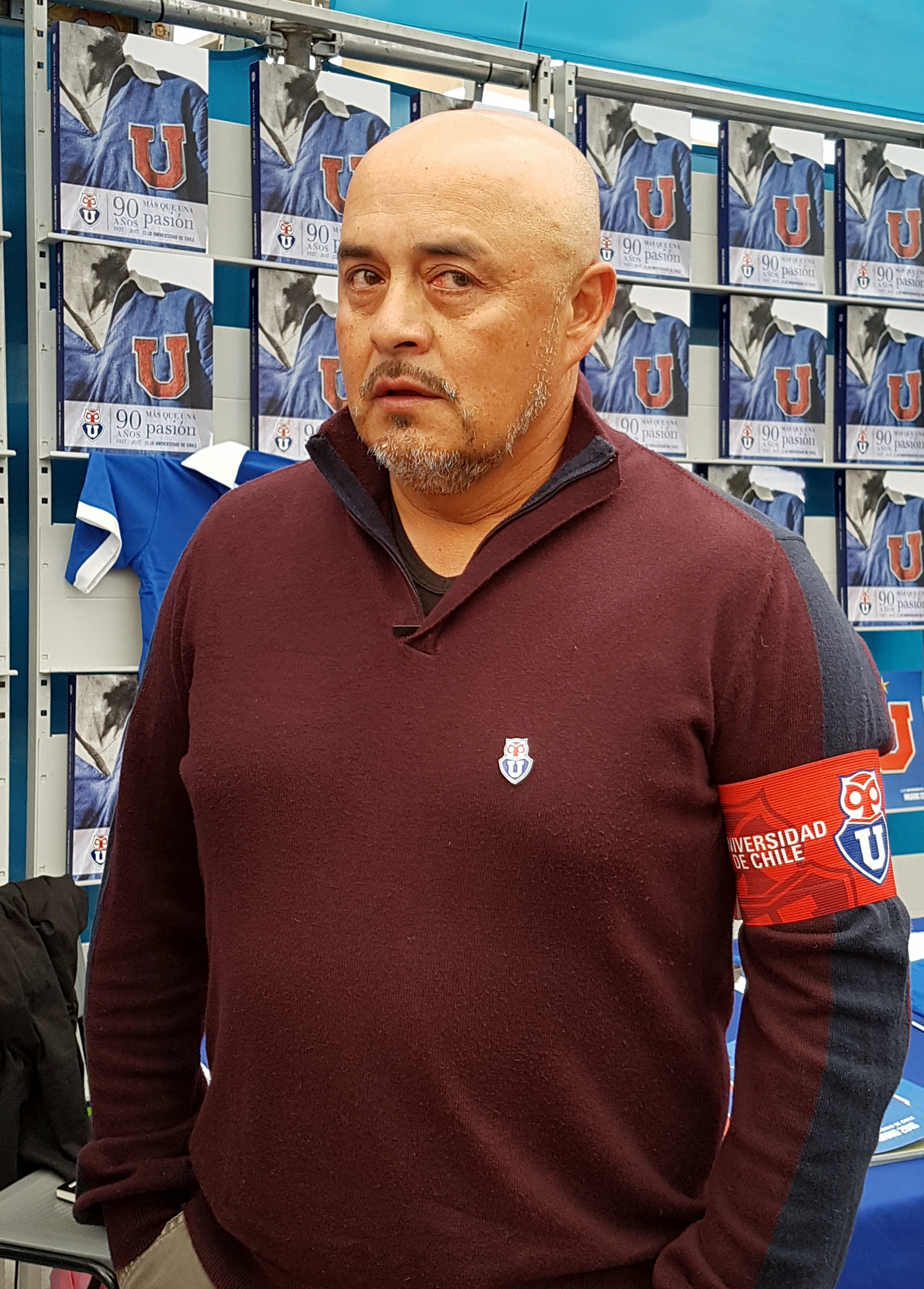
- Musrri in 2017

Personal information
- Full name: Luis Eduardo Musrri Saravia
- Date of birth: 24 December 1969 (age 56)
- Place of birth: Mallarauco (Melipilla, Chile)
- Height: 1.73 m (5 ft 8 in)
- Position: Defensive midfielder

Team information
- Current team: Unión Compañías (manager)

Youth career
- Universidad de Chile

Senior career*
Years	Team	Apps	(Gls)
1987–2000	Universidad de Chile	338	(10)
2001	Yunnan Hongta	27	(0)
2002–2004	Universidad de Chile	63	(0)
Total		428	(10)

International career
1987–1988	Chile U20		
1991–1998	Chile	28	(0)

Managerial career
- 2004–2005: Deportivo Luis Musrri
- 2006–2007: Deportes Melipilla
- 2007–2009: Palestino
- 2010–2012: Cobresal
- 2012–2013: Coquimbo Unido
- 2014–2015: San Antonio Unido
- 2015–2016: Deportes La Serena
- 2016: Universidad de Chile (assistant)
- 2017: Universidad de Chile (youth)
- 2018: San Marcos
- 2018: Deportes Iquique
- 2019–2020: Independiente Cauquenes
- 2021: Deportes Iquique
- 2022–2023: San Antonio Unido
- 2023–2024: UCEN
- 2024: El Dínamo
- 2025–: Unión Compañías
- * Club domestic league appearances and goals

Luis Eduardo Musrri Saravia (born 24 December 1969) is a Chilean football coach and former player who coaches Unión Compañías in the Chilean Tercera B. He was born in Mallarauco, Melipilla.

== Club career ==
Musrri played mostly for Universidad de Chile as well as one season in Yunnan Hongta. He was captain of "the Blue squad" for over 10 years, played alongside other players such as Marcelo Salas, Sergio Vargas, Pedro González, among others.

== International career ==
Musrri represented Chile U20 in both the 1987 and the 1988 South American Championships as well as the 1987 FIFA World Youth Championship, where Chile reached fourth place.

Musrri was member of the Chilean squad that finished 4th at 1987 FIFA World Youth Championship. He was also selected for 1998 FIFA World Cup in France and played 28 times for Chile national football team.

== Coaching career ==
Musrri started his career with Deportivo Luis Musrri from Mallarauco in the Chilean Tercera División.

After coaching the team of Universidad Central de Chile and club El Dínamo during 2024, both in La Serena, Musrri was appointed as manager of Unión Compañías in the Chilean Tercera B.

== Personal life ==
Musrri married Fabiola Pardo, a former Chile international basketball player.

His son, Luis Musrri Pardo, is a basketball player who has represented Chile at under-15 and under-17 level.

== Other works ==
Musrri has performed as a football commentator for Radio Montecarlo from La Serena.

== Honours ==
Universidad de Chile

- Segunda División de Chile: 1989
- Primera División de Chile: 1994, 1995, 1999, 2000, 2004–A
- Copa Chile: 1998, 2000
