= 1988 South American U-20 Championship =

1988 South American Youth Championship
Tournament details
- Host country: Argentina
- Dates: 2–22 May
- Teams: 11

Final positions
- Champions: Brazil (4th title)
- Runners-up: Colombia
- Third place: Argentina
- Fourth place: Paraguay

The South American Youth Championship 1988 was held in Buenos Aires, Argentina. It also served as qualification for the 1989 FIFA World Youth Championship.

== Teams ==
The following teams entered the tournament:

- Argentina (host)
- Bolivia
- Brazil
- Chile
- Colombia
- Ecuador
- Israel (invited)
- Paraguay
- Peru
- Uruguay
- Venezuela

== First round ==
=== Group A ===
Teams	Pld	W	D	L	GF	GA	GD	Pts
Argentina	5	5	0	0	10	1	+9	10
Paraguay	5	3	0	2	10	6	+4	6
Israel	5	3	0	2	6	4	+2	6
Peru	5	2	1	2	5	7	–2	5
Chile	5	1	1	3	5	10	–5	3
Venezuela	5	0	0	5	4	12	–8	0

2 May	Chile	1–1	Peru
	Argentina	1–0	Venezuela
	Israel	1–0	Paraguay
4 May	Chile	2–1	Venezuela
	Paraguay	2–0	Peru
	Argentina	2–0	Israel
6 May	Paraguay	6–2	Venezuela
	Argentina	3–1	Chile
	Peru	2–1	Israel
10 May	Israel	1–0	Venezuela
	Paraguay	2–1	Chile
	Argentina	2–0	Peru
12 May	Peru	2–1	Venezuela
	Argentina	2–0	Paraguay
	Israel	3–0	Chile

=== Group B ===
Teams	Pld	W	D	L	GF	GA	GD	Pts
Colombia	4	3	1	0	6	1	+5	7
Brazil	4	3	0	1	11	1	+10	6
Ecuador	4	1	1	2	3	11	–8	3
Uruguay	4	0	2	2	2	4	–2	2
Bolivia	4	1	0	3	4	9	–5	2

3 May	Uruguay	1–1	Ecuador
	Brazil	3–0	Bolivia
5 May	Ecuador	2–1	Bolivia
	Colombia	1–0	Brazil
9 May	Bolivia	2–1	Uruguay
	Colombia	2–0	Ecuador
11 May	Brazil	7–0	Ecuador
	Uruguay	0–0	Colombia
13 May	Colombia	3–1	Bolivia
	Brazil	1–0	Uruguay

== Final round ==
Teams	Pld	W	D	L	GF	GA	GD	Pts
Brazil	3	2	1	0	3	1	+2	5
Colombia	3	1	1	1	3	2	+1	3
Argentina	3	1	0	2	3	4	–1	2
Paraguay	3	1	0	2	1	3	–2	2

16 May	Colombia	2–0	Paraguay
	Brazil	2–1	Argentina
19 May	Brazil	0–0	Colombia
	Paraguay	1–0	Argentina
22 May	Argentina	2–1	Colombia
	Brazil	1–0	Paraguay

1988 South American Youth Championship

Brazil
Fourth title

== Qualification to World Youth Championship ==
The three best performing teams qualified for the 1989 FIFA World Youth Championship.

- Argentina
- Brazil
- Colombia
