= 1974 South American U-20 Championship =

1974 South American Youth Championship
Tournament details
- Host country: Chile
- Dates: 1–24 March
- Teams: 9

Final positions
- Champions: Brazil (1st title)
- Runners-up: Uruguay
- Third place: Paraguay
- Fourth place: Argentina

The South American Youth Championship 1974 was held in Arica, Concepción and Santiago, Chile.

== Teams ==
The following teams entered the tournament:

- Argentina
- Brazil
- Chile (host)
- Colombia
- Ecuador
- Paraguay
- Peru
- Uruguay
- Venezuela

== Group stage ==
=== Group A ===
Teams	Pld	W	D	L	GF	GA	GD	Pts
Paraguay	3	2	1	0	5	1	+4	5
Argentina	3	1	2	0	3	2	+1	4
Peru	3	1	1	1	2	2	0	3
Ecuador	3	0	0	3	0	5	–5	0

8 March	Argentina	1–0	Ecuador
	Paraguay	1–0	Peru
10 March	Argentina	1–1	Paraguay
13 March	Peru	1–0	Ecuador
16 March	Paraguay	3–0	Ecuador
17 March	Argentina	1–1	Peru

=== Group B ===
Teams	Pld	W	D	L	GF	GA	GD	Pts
Brazil	4	3	1	0	14	2	+12	7
Uruguay	4	2	1	1	7	4	+3	5
Chile	4	1	1	2	4	6	–2	3
Venezuela	4	1	1	2	3	8	–5	3
Colombia	4	1	0	3	4	12	–8	2

1 March	Uruguay	3–1	Colombia
	Chile	1–1	Venezuela
6 March	Brazil	4–0	Venezuela
	Chile	3–0	Colombia
10 March	Uruguay	2–0	Chile
	Brazil	6–1	Colombia
13 March	Brazil	1–1	Uruguay
	Colombia	2–0	Venezuela
16/17 March	Venezuela	2–1	Uruguay
	Brazil	3–0	Chile

== Semifinals ==
22 March 1974

Brazil	2 – 0	Argentina

Santiago
22 March 1974

Uruguay	3 – 0	Paraguay

Santiago

== Third place match ==
24 March 1974

Argentina	0 – 1	Paraguay

Santiago

== Final ==
24 March 1974

Brazil	2 – 1	Uruguay

Santiago

1974 South American Youth Championship

Brazil
First title
