= 1954 South American U-20 Championship =

1954 South American Youth Championship
Tournament details
- Host country: Venezuela
- Dates: 22 March – 13 April
- Teams: 9

Final positions
- Champions: Uruguay (1st title)
- Runners-up: Brazil
- Third place: Venezuela
- Fourth place: Peru

Tournament statistics
- Matches played: 19
- Goals scored: 64 (3.37 per match)
- Top scorer: (Paraguay) Juan Agüero (7)

The South American Youth Championship 1954 was held in Caracas, Venezuela. It was the first time the tournament was organised.

== Teams ==
The following teams entered the tournament:

- Brazil
- Chile
- Colombia
- Ecuador
- Panama
- Paraguay
- Peru
- Uruguay
- Venezuela (host)

Argentina did not participate in this tournament. They were the only non-European team to play in the 1954 FIFA Youth Tournament Under-18.

== First round ==
Host Venezuela automatically qualified for the final round.

=== Group A ===
| Teams | Pld | W | D | L | GF | GA | GD | Pts |
|---|---|---|---|---|---|---|---|---|
| Uruguay | 3 | 2 | 1 | 0 | 7 | 2 | +5 | 5 |
| Colombia | 3 | 1 | 2 | 0 | 3 | 2 | +1 | 4 |
| Chile | 3 | 0 | 2 | 1 | 2 | 4 | –2 | 2 |
| Ecuador | 3 | 0 | 1 | 2 | 2 | 6 | –4 | 1 |

| 22 March | Colombia | 1–1 | Uruguay |
| 23 March | Chile | 1–1 | Ecuador |
| 25 March | Uruguay | 4–1 | Ecuador |
| 26 March | Chile | 1–1 | Colombia |
| 29 March | Colombia | 1–0 | Ecuador |
| 30 March | Uruguay | 2–0 | Chile |

=== Group B ===
| Teams | Pld | W | D | L | GF | GA | GD | Pts |
|---|---|---|---|---|---|---|---|---|
| Brazil | 3 | 2 | 1 | 0 | 10 | 3 | +7 | 5 |
| Peru | 3 | 1 | 2 | 0 | 7 | 5 | +2 | 4 |
| Paraguay | 3 | 1 | 1 | 1 | 12 | 5 | +7 | 3 |
| Panama | 3 | 0 | 0 | 3 | 4 | 20 | –16 | 0 |

| 23 March | Brazil | 7–1 | Panama |
| | Paraguay | 2–2 | Peru |
| 26 March | Paraguay | 9–1 | Panama |
| 27 March | Brazil | 1–1 | Peru |
| 31 March | Peru | 4–2 | Panama |
| | Brazil | 2–1 | Paraguay |

=== Second-place play-off ===
2 April 1954

| Peru | 1 – 0 | Colombia |
|---|---|---|
| Natteri 20' | Report |

Caracas

== Final round ==
| Teams | Pld | W | D | L | GF | GA | GD | Pts |
|---|---|---|---|---|---|---|---|---|
| Uruguay | 3 | 2 | 1 | 0 | 7 | 2 | +5 | 5 |
| Brazil | 3 | 1 | 2 | 0 | 4 | 2 | +2 | 4 |
| Venezuela | 3 | 1 | 0 | 2 | 3 | 6 | –3 | 2 |
| Peru | 3 | 0 | 1 | 2 | 2 | 6 | –4 | 1 |

| 3 April | Brazil | 2–0 | Venezuela |
| 5 April | Uruguay | 3–0 | Peru |
| 7 April | Uruguay | 3–1 | Venezuela |
| 9 April | Brazil | 1–1 | Peru |
| 11 April | Venezuela | 2–1 | Peru |
| 13 April | Brazil | 1–1 | Uruguay |

1954 South American Youth Championship

Uruguay
First title
