= Robin Ramírez =

Paraguayan footballer (born 1989)

Robin Ramirez
Personal information
- Full name: Robin Ariel Ramirez Gonzalez
- Date of birth: 11 November 1989 (age 37)
- Place of birth: Ciudad del Este, Paraguay
- Height: 1.71 m (5 ft 7 in)
- Position: Forward

Team information
- Current team: Sportivo Iteño

Youth career
- 2004–2009: Libertad

Senior career*
Years	Team	Apps	(Gls)
2009–2013	Libertad	24	(5)
2010–2011	→ Rubio Ñu (loan)	49	(15)
2012	→ Deportes Tolima (loan)	51	(23)
2013	UNAM	28	(3)
2014	→ Deportivo Cali (loan)	14	(3)
2015	→ Deportes Tolima (loan)	29	(8)
2016	Nacional	21	(3)
2016–2017	Atlético de Rafaela	13	(0)
2017	Deportivo Pasto	18	(4)
2018–2019	Deportes Tolima	23	(1)
2019–2020	River Plate Asunción	46	(6)
2021-	Sportivo Iteño	--	(--)

International career
2008–2009	Paraguay U-20	15	(10)
2011	Paraguay	5	(1)
- * Club domestic league appearances and goals as of 10:10, 20 December 2020 (UTC)

Robin Ariel Ramírez González (Note: In this Spanish name, the first or paternal surname is Ramírez and the second or maternal family name is González.) (born 11 November 1989), also known as Robin Ramírez, is a Paraguayan footballer who plays as forward for Sportivo Iteño in the Paraguay División Intermedia.

== Career ==
It started in the club's training Club Libertad at the age of 14, and went through all the categories with much success. In 2005, aged 15, Ramírez alternated in the Under-16, Under-17 and Under-18 squads, being champion in all competitions. The following year he was taken into account for the Under-19, Under-20 and some games of the Reserve, with equal success. He was dubbed "El Niño Maravilla" meaning "The Kid Wonder" Forward, moving, devilish, with movements similar to those of Pippin Nelson Cuevas, perhaps without much dribbling but with a physique similar, Robin began to also noteworthy for its versatility. Net striker could act, bullet, flyer with arrival or even by right winger, giving many options to their coaches.

Just his moves without the ball, positioning, their diagonal triangulations and finding gaps are its greatest virtues. Also stands out as a player sacrificed, that brings in the brand and puts pressure on opposing defenders. However, despite their mere 1.71 meters, a very young Robin has had a special romance with the goal. With 17 years was top scorer at the U-19 in the year 2007, with 23 victories. In 2008 alternated between the Under-19, Under-20 and Reserve. In January 2010 was transferred to Rubio Nu in search of greater opportunities to play. He scored his first goal in Paraguayan Primera División on 30 July 2010 to Olimpia, in the framework of the 3rd date of 2010 Paraguayan Primera División season. In June 2011, after becoming the scorer albiverde with 12 goals during the Apertura was the scorer of the tournament. Team returned to its original owner tab, Freedom. In January 2012 military enters the ranks of the Deportes Tolima which was opening scorer with 13 goals. In December 2012 he was sold to Universidad Nacional Autonoma de Mexico of Mexico at 1.5 million dollars.

In 2021, Ramirez joined Sportivo Iteño for the División Intermedia season.

== National team ==
The 2009 South American U-20 Championship of Venezuela, played between January and February 2009, marked the debut of Robin Ramirez all the Paraguay national under-20 football team in official matches since no previous integrated payroll for U-15 tournaments and U-17.

After scoring against Uruguay national under-20 football team in his second appearance, Robin caught the attention, with three goals scored to Bolivia national under-20 football team on the fourth day of the first phase. And plus he scored a Venezuela national under-20 football team, and by the decisive stage, accumulated his fifth target with which eventually became one of the scorers tournament, in which his team was also runner-up.

Later, in September, Robin was called again, this time to compete in the 2009 FIFA U-20 World Cup.
