= 1977 South American U-20 Championship =

1977 South American Youth Championship
Tournament details
- Host country: Venezuela
- Dates: 16 April – 6 May
- Teams: 9

Final positions
- Champions: Uruguay (5th title)
- Runners-up: Brazil
- Third place: Paraguay
- Fourth place: Chile

The South American Youth Championship 1977 was held in Caracas, Mérida and Valencia, Venezuela. It also served as qualification for the 1977 FIFA World Youth Championship.

== Teams ==
The following teams entered the tournament:

- Argentina
- Bolivia
- Brazil
- Chile
- Colombia
- Paraguay
- Peru
- Uruguay
- Venezuela (host)

== First round ==
=== Group A ===
Teams	Pld	W	D	L	GF	GA	GD	Pts
Brazil	3	3	0	0	9	1	+8	6
Chile	3	2	0	1	5	4	+1	4
Colombia	3	1	0	2	2	5	–3	2
Bolivia	3	0	0	3	1	7	–6	0

16 April	Colombia	2–1	Bolivia
18 April	Chile	2–0	Colombia
21 April	Brazil	3–0	Bolivia
24 April	Chile	2–0	Bolivia
	Brazil	2–0	Colombia
27 April	Brazil	4–1	Chile

=== Group B ===
Teams	Pld	W	D	L	GF	GA	GD	Pts
Paraguay	4	3	1	0	8	4	+4	7
Uruguay	4	2	2	0	6	2	+4	6
Peru	4	1	1	2	7	9	–2	3
Argentina	4	0	2	2	3	5	–2	2
Venezuela	4	0	2	2	1	5	–4	2

16 April	Paraguay	5–3	Peru
	Argentina	1–1	Uruguay
18 April	Paraguay	2–1	Argentina
	Peru	1–1	Venezuela
21 April	Peru	2–1	Argentina
	Uruguay	3–0	Venezuela
24 April	Uruguay	0–0	Paraguay
	Argentina	0–0	Venezuela
27 April	Uruguay	2–1	Peru
	Paraguay	1–0	Venezuela

== Final round ==
Teams	Pld	W	D	L	GF	GA	GD	Pts
Uruguay	3	2	1	0	5	0	+5	5
Brazil	3	2	1	0	4	1	+3	5
Paraguay	3	0	1	2	2	5	–3	1
Chile	3	0	1	2	1	6	–5	1

30 April	Chile	1–1	Paraguay
	Brazil	0–0	Uruguay
4 May	Brazil	1–0	Chile
	Uruguay	1–0	Paraguay
6 May	Brazil	3–1	Paraguay
	Uruguay	4–0	Chile

1977 South American Youth Championship

Uruguay
Fifth title

== Qualification to World Youth Championship ==
The three best performing teams qualified for the 1977 FIFA World Youth Championship.

- Brazil
- Paraguay
- Uruguay
