= Samuel Sosa =

Venezuelan footballer (born 1999)

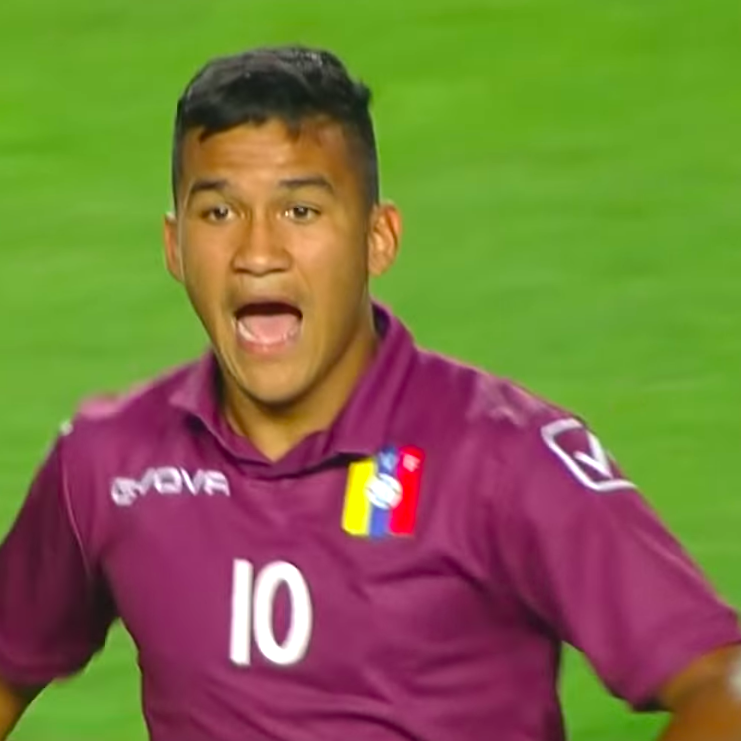
- Sosa with Venezuela U20s in 2019

Personal information
- Full name: Samuel Alejandro Sosa Cordero
- Date of birth: 17 December 1999 (age 26)
- Place of birth: Valencia, Venezuela
- Height: 1.77 m (5 ft 9 1/2 in)
- Position: Winger

Team information
- Current team: Universidad Central
- Number: 10

Youth career
- –2016: Deportivo Táchira

Senior career*
Years	Team	Apps	(Gls)
2016–2017	Deportivo Táchira	36	(8)
2018–2025	Talleres	5	(1)
2019–2021	→ Alcorcón (loan)	50	(2)
2022	→ Academia Puerto Cabello (loan)	28	(9)
2023	→ Emelec (loan)	17	(2)
2024	→ Querétaro (loan)	27	(4)
2025	→ Universidad Central (loan)	31	(7)
2026–	Universidad Central	6	(2)

International career^{‡}
2017–2019	Venezuela U20	15	(4)
2019–	Venezuela	7	(0)
- * Club domestic league appearances and goals as of 10 March 2026 ‡ National team caps and goals as of 22 November 2023

Samuel Alejandro Sosa Cordero (born 17 December 1999) is a Venezuelan footballer who plays as a winger for Universidad Central and the Venezuela national team.

== Club career ==
Sosa represented Deportivo Táchira and Talleres de Córdoba. On 29 July 2019, he moved to Europe and joined Spanish Segunda División side AD Alcorcón on loan for one year. On 27 August of the following year, his loan was extended for a further season.

== International career ==
Sosa was called up to the Venezuela under-20 side for the 2017 FIFA U-20 World Cup. He scored the seventh goal in his side's 7–0 victory over Vanuatu.

Sosa took part in his side's run to the final, particularly scoring an injury-time equalizer against Uruguay through a spectacular free-kick as his side beat their fellow South American rivals on penalties to advance to the final, with Sosa scoring his attempt.

He made his Venezuela national football team debut on 1 June 2019, in a friendly against Ecuador, as a half-time substitute for Adalberto Peñaranda.

== Career statistics ==
=== Club ===
As of 31 July 2019

Club performance		League		Cup		Continental		Total	
Club	Season	Apps	Goals	Apps	Goals	Apps	Goals	Apps	Goals
Deportivo Táchira	2016	14	1	0	0	1	0	15	1
Deportivo Táchira	2017	22	7	0	0	2	0	24	7
Deportivo Táchira	Total	36	8	0	0	3	0	39	8
Talleres	2017–18	1	0	1	0	0	0	2	0
Talleres	2018–19	4	1	0	0	0	0	4	1
Talleres	Total	5	1	1	0	0	0	6	1
Career total		41	9	1	0	3	0	45	9

=== International ===
As of match played 01 June 2019.

National team	Year	Apps	Goals
Venezuela	2019	1	0
Total		1	0

== Honours ==
Venezuela

- FIFA U-20 World Cup runner-up: 2017

Individual

- South American U-20 Championship Team of the Tournament: 2019
