= 1992 South American U-20 Championship =

1992 South American Youth Championship
Tournament details
- Host country: Colombia
- Dates: 16–30 August
- Teams: 8

Final positions
- Champions: Brazil (6th title)
- Runners-up: Uruguay
- Third place: Colombia
- Fourth place: Ecuador

The South American Youth Championship 1992 was held in Medellín, Colombia. It also served as qualification for the 1993 FIFA World Youth Championship.

== Teams ==
The following teams entered the tournament:

- Bolivia
- Brazil
- Chile
- Colombia (host)
- Ecuador
- Paraguay
- Peru
- Uruguay

(Argentina were banned by the FIFA due to misbehaviour at the previous World Youth Championship)

== First round ==
=== Group A ===
Teams	Pld	W	D	L	GF	GA	GD	Pts
Colombia	3	2	1	0	4	1	+3	5
Uruguay	3	2	1	0	4	1	+3	5
Chile	3	1	0	2	2	2	0	2
Peru	3	0	0	3	2	8	–6	0

Colombia	3–1	Peru
Uruguay	1–0	Chile
Uruguay	3–1	Peru
Colombia	1–0	Chile
Chile	2–0	Peru
Colombia	0–0	Uruguay

=== Group B ===
Teams	Pld	W	D	L	GF	GA	GD	Pts
Brazil	3	3	0	0	4	0	+4	6
Ecuador	3	1	1	1	5	4	+1	3
Paraguay	3	1	1	1	3	2	+1	3
Bolivia	3	0	0	3	1	7	–6	0

Paraguay	1–1	Ecuador
Brazil	1–0	Bolivia
Paraguay	2–0	Bolivia
Brazil	2–0	Ecuador
Ecuador	4–1	Bolivia
Brazil	1–0	Paraguay

== Final round ==
Teams	Pld	W	D	L	GF	GA	GD	Pts
Brazil	3	2	1	0	3	0	+3	5
Uruguay	3	1	2	0	3	1	+2	4
Colombia	3	0	2	1	0	1	–1	2
Ecuador	3	0	1	2	1	5	–4	1

Colombia	0–0	Ecuador
Brazil	0–0	Uruguay
Brazil	2–0	Ecuador
Colombia	0–0	Uruguay
Colombia	0–1	Brazil
Uruguay	3–1	Ecuador

1992 South American Youth Championship

Brazil
Sixth title

== Qualification to World Youth Championship ==
The three best performing teams qualified for the 1993 FIFA World Youth Championship.

- Brazil
- Colombia
- Uruguay
