= 1979 South American U-20 Championship =

1979 South American Youth Championship
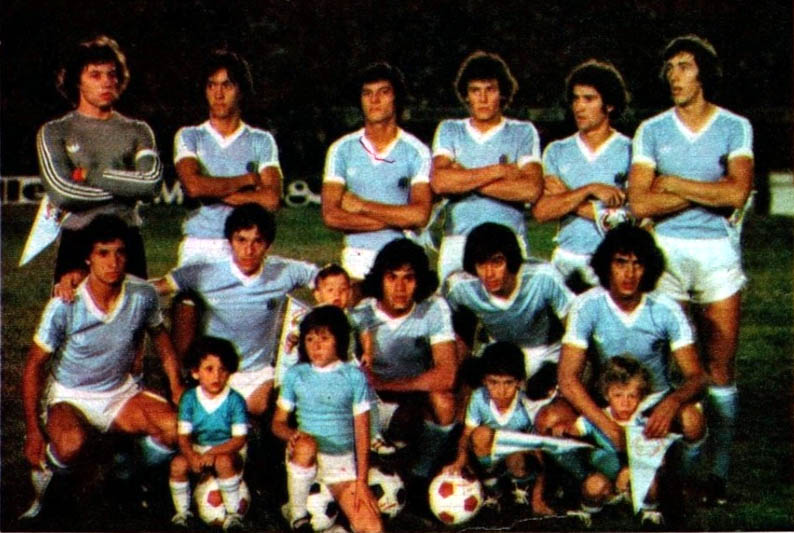
- Uruguay, champions

Tournament details
- Host country: Uruguay
- Dates: 12–31 January
- Teams: 9

Final positions
- Champions: Uruguay (6th title)
- Runners-up: Argentina
- Third place: Paraguay
- Fourth place: Brazil

The South American Youth Championship 1979 was held in Montevideo and Paysandú, Uruguay. It also served as qualification for the 1979 FIFA World Youth Championship.

== Teams ==
The following teams entered the tournament:

- Argentina
- Bolivia
- Brazil
- Chile
- Colombia
- Ecuador
- Paraguay
- Peru
- Uruguay (host)

== First round ==
=== Group A ===
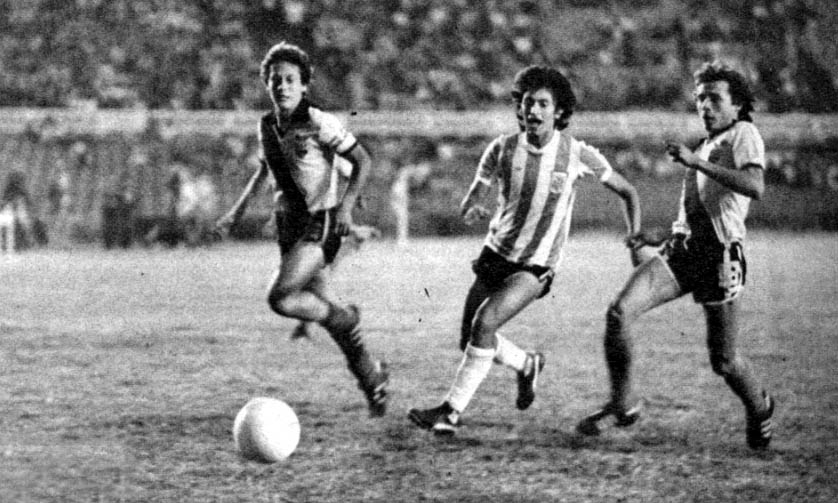
Ramón Díaz scoring for Argentina v Ecuador

Pos	Team	Pld	W	D	L	GF	GA	GD	Pts	Qualification
1	Uruguay	3	3	0	0	9	0	+9	6	Advance to Final round
2	Argentina	3	2	0	1	9	1	+8	4	Advance to Final round
3	Peru	3	1	0	2	2	7	−5	2	
4	Ecuador	3	0	0	3	0	12	−12	0	

Source: RSSSF

12 January	Uruguay	5–0	Ecuador
13 January	Argentina	4–0	Peru
18 January	Argentina	5–0	Ecuador
	Uruguay	3–0	Peru
22 January	Peru	2–0	Ecuador
	Uruguay	1–0	Argentina

=== Group B ===
Pos	Team	Pld	W	D	L	GF	GA	GD	Pts	Qualification
1	Paraguay	4	3	1	0	13	1	+12	7	Advance to Final round
2	Brazil	4	2	1	1	4	3	+1	5	Advance to Final round
3	Chile	4	2	0	2	7	8	−1	4	
4	Colombia	4	2	0	2	7	9	−2	4	
5	Bolivia	4	0	0	4	2	12	−10	0	

Source: RSSSF

12 January	Paraguay	6–0	Chile
	Colombia	2–1	Brazil
14 January	Colombia	5–1	Bolivia
	Brazil	1–0	Chile
17 January	Paraguay	5–0	Colombia
	Brazil	1–0	Bolivia
19 January	Chile	2–0	Colombia
	Paraguay	1–0	Bolivia
22 January	Chile	5–1	Bolivia
	Brazil	1–1	Paraguay

=== Fifth-place match ===
Chile	3 – 1	Peru

== Final round ==
=== Standings ===
Pos	Team	Pld	W	D	L	GF	GA	GD	Pts	Qualification
1	Uruguay	3	2	1	0	3	1	+2	5	Qualification for 1979 FIFA Youth World Cup
2	Argentina	3	1	2	0	1	0	+1	4	Qualification for 1979 FIFA Youth World Cup
3	Paraguay	3	1	1	1	3	3	0	3	Advance to Inter-continental qualification
4	Brazil	3	0	0	3	1	4	−3	0	

Source: RSSSF

=== Matches ===
Final round
25 Jan
Match 1

Argentina	0–0	Paraguay

25 Jan
Match 1

Uruguay	1–0	Brazil

28 Jan
Match 2

Paraguay	2–1	Brazil

28 Jan
Match 2

Uruguay	0–0	Argentina

31 Jan
Match 3

Argentina	1–0	Brazil
Albes (pen.)

31 Jan
Match 3

Uruguay	2–1	Paraguay
Roo; Viera		Caballero 73'

== Winner ==
1979 South American Youth Championship

Uruguay
Sixth title

== Inter-continental qualification ==
The two best performing teams qualified directly for the 1979 FIFA World Youth Championship.

- Argentina
- Uruguay

Paraguay also qualified, after winning an intercontinental play-off against Israel and Australia. Matches were played in Asunción, Paraguay.

Pos	Team	Pld	W	D	L	GF	GA	GD	Pts	Qualification
1	Paraguay	4	4	0	0	10	1	+9	8	Qualification for 1979 FIFA World Youth Championship
2	Israel	4	0	2	2	1	5	−4	2	
3	Australia	4	0	2	2	0	5	−5	2	

Source: RSSSF

7 February	Paraguay	2–0	Australia
9 February	Israel	0–0	Australia
11 February	Paraguay	3–0	Israel
14 February	Australia	0–0	Israel
16 February	Paraguay	3–0	Australia
18 February	Paraguay	2–1	Israel
