= Enrique Wolff =

Argentine footballer and journalist

Quique Wolff
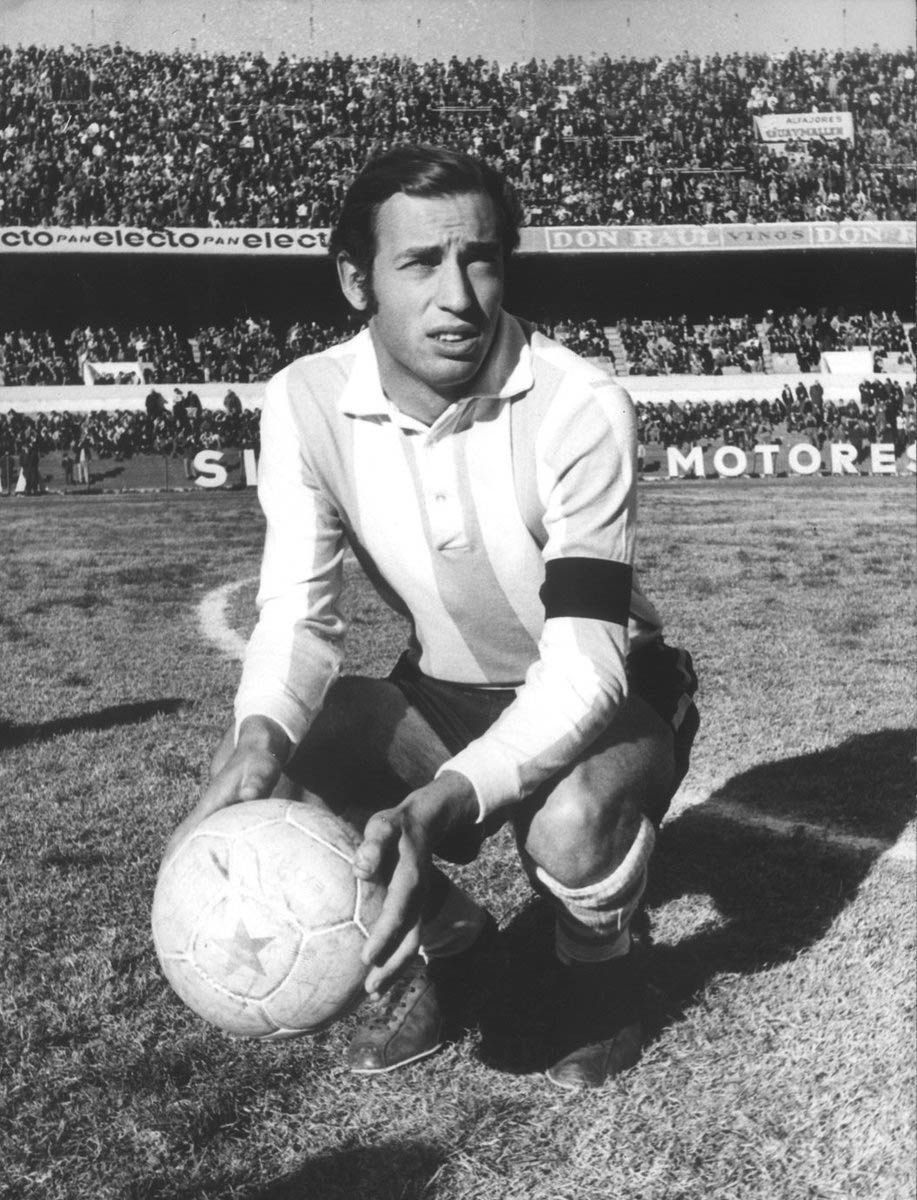
- Quique Wolff at Racing Club in 1972

Personal information
- Full name: Enrique Ernesto Wolff Dos Santos
- Date of birth: 21 February 1949 (age 77)
- Place of birth: Victoria, Buenos Aires, Argentina
- Height: 1.75 m (5 ft 9 in)
- Position: Defender

Senior career*
Years	Team	Apps	(Gls)
1967–1972	Racing Club	165	(31)
1973–1974	Club Atlético River Plate	37	(6)
1974–1977	Las Palmas	93	(7)
1977–1979	Real Madrid	68	(4)
1979	Argentinos Juniors	8	(0)
1981	Tigre	7	(0)
Total		378	(48)

International career
1972–1974	Argentina	27	(1)
- * Club domestic league appearances and goals as of 1 January 2007

Enrique Ernesto "Quique" Wolff (born 21 February 1949) is an Argentine journalist and former football defender. He represented Argentina at the 1974 World Cup.

== Playing career ==
Wolff, born in Victoria, Buenos Aires, began his career with Racing Club in 1967. He played for the club until he was transferred to River Plate in 1972.

In 1974 Wolff was transferred to UD Las Palmas in Spain, and 3 years later he joined Spanish giants Real Madrid where he was part of the championship winning sides of 1977-1978 and 1978–1979.

Wolff returned to Argentina in 1979 to play for Argentinos Juniors, but he only managed 8 appearances before retiring. Two years after his retirement Wolff turned out for Club Atlético Tigre in the Argentine 2nd division.

== Sports Caster ==
In 1992, he started a football-related television show named Simplemente Fútbol (Just football) in Argentina, which first aired locally, then moved to the Telefe network, where it was transmitted from 1993 to 1996. In 1998, the program moved to Fox Sports Americas. Since 2000, Simplemente Fútbol airs on ESPN Latin America.

Enrique Quique Wolff is it anchor announcers of SportsCenter on ESPN (South Cone) with Enrique Sacco in First Edition of SportsCenter (South Cone) from Monday to Friday at 13:00 (Local Time from Buenos Aires) at 11:00 (Local Time from Bogotá) and the 11:30 (Local Time from Caracas) live on ESPN +.

Due to the layoffs that is suffering the channel network, on May 30, 2024, was released, ending 32 years in the channel and with this his TV program, Simplemente Fútbol, practically disappear.

== Honours ==
Racing Club

- Intercontinental Cup: 1967

Real Madrid

- Liga de Primera División: 1977–78, 1978–79
- Copa del Rey runner-up: 1978–79

Argentina Youth

- U-20 South American Championship: 1967
