= 1967 South American U-20 Championship =

1967 South American Youth Championship
Tournament details
- Host country: Paraguay
- Dates: 3–29 March
- Teams: 9

Final positions
- Champions: Argentina (1st title)
- Runners-up: Paraguay

The South American Youth Championship 1967 was held in Asunción, Paraguay.

== Teams ==
The following teams entered the tournament:

- Argentina
- Brazil
- Chile
- Colombia
- Ecuador
- Paraguay (host)
- Peru
- Uruguay
- Venezuela

== Group stage ==
=== Group A ===
Teams	Pld	W	D	L	GF	GA	GD	Pts
Paraguay	3	2	0	1	8	4	+4	4
Argentina	3	1	1	1	5	5	0	3
Colombia	3	1	1	1	5	5	0	3
Venezuela	3	1	0	2	4	8	–4	2

5 March	Paraguay	4–0	Venezuela
6 March	Argentina	1–1	Colombia
8 March	Venezuela	3–1	Colombia
12 March	Paraguay	3–1	Argentina
19 March	Colombia	3–1	Paraguay
	Argentina	3–1	Venezuela

==== Tie-breaker ====
22 March 1967

Argentina	0–0	Colombia

?, Asunción

Note:Argentina qualified after the result was decided by tossing a coin

=== Group B ===
Teams	Pld	W	D	L	GF	GA	GD	Pts
Brazil	4	3	0	1	7	3	+4	6
Peru	4	2	1	1	8	5	+3	5
Chile	4	2	0	2	5	7	–2	4
Uruguay	4	1	1	2	5	7	–2	3
Ecuador	4	1	0	3	4	7	–3	2

3 March	Peru	2–2	Uruguay
6 March	Ecuador	2–1	Brazil
8 March	Peru	3–1	Chile
11 March	Brazil	3–1	Uruguay
	Peru	3–1	Ecuador
14 March	Uruguay	1–0	Ecuador
	Brazil	2–0	Chile
17 March	Chile	2–1	Ecuador
18 March	Brazil	1–0	Peru
19 March	Chile	2–1	Uruguay

== Semifinals ==
26 March 1967

Argentina	2–0	Brazil

Asunción
26 March 1967

Paraguay	2–1	Peru

Asunción

== Final ==
1967 South American U-20 Championship Final
29 March 1967

Paraguay	2–2 (a.e.t.)	Argentina
Yugovich 59'; Ramírez 60'	Report 1 Report 2	Pasternak 50'; Ricciardi 67'

Estadio Manuel Ferreira, Asunción
Referee: César Orozco (Peru)

Note: Argentina won the championship after the result was decided by tossing a coin.

Team details

Paraguay
Argentina

GK	Rubén Melgarejo
DF	Vidal Carvallo
DF	Gerardo Laterza
DF	Ángel Adorno
DF	Néstor García (captain)
MF	Julio Mendieta	(substituted off) 82'
MF	Alcibiades Francia
MF	Joaquín Yugovich	(substituted off) 73'
FW	Gabriel Lezcano
FW	Augusto Ramírez
FW	Carlos Mendiola
Substitutes:
	Pedro Cíbils	(substituted on) 73'
	Adalberto Escobar	(substituted on) 82'
Manager:
(Paraguay) Luis Benítez Chilavert

GK	José Pérez
DF	Jorge Dominichi
DF	José Gómez
DF	Carlos Siciliano
DF	Jorge Teijón
MF	José Martínez
MF	Héctor Martínez	(substituted off) 67'
MF	Antonio Ameijenda
FW	Marcos Ricciardi
FW	José Pasternak	(substituted off) 78'
FW	Carlos García Cambón	(substituted off) 42'
Substitutes:
FW	Miguel Converti	(substituted on) 42'
FW	Francisco Cibeyra	(substituted on) 67'
DF	Enrique Wolff	(substituted on) 78'
Manager:
(Argentina) Juan Carlos Giménez

== Squads ==
=== Argentina ===
José Alberto Pérez (River Plate), Jorge D'Alessandro (San Lorenzo), Jorge Eduardo Dominici (River Plate), José Gómez (Gimnasia y Esgrima LP), Horacio Tocalini (Chacarita Juniors), Carlos Siciliano (Racing Club), Eduardo Commisso (River Plate), Jorge Teijón (Deportivo Morón), Marcos Ricciardi (Chacarita Juniors), José Martínez (San Lorenzo), Francisco Cibeyra (River Plate), Héctor Martínez (Racing Club), José Pasternak (Gimnasia y Esgrima LP), Antonio García (San Lorenzo), Enrique Wolff (Racing Club), Juan Loyola (Chacarita Juniors), Miguel Converti (Banfield), Carlos García Cambón (Chacarita Juniors)
Managers: Juan Carlos Giménez and Mario Imbelloni.

1967 South American Youth Championship

Argentina
First title
