= Pablo Pedraza =

Bolivian footballer (born 1995)

Personal information
- Full name: Pablo Elías Pedraza Bustos
- Date of birth: 10 March 1995 (age 31)
- Place of birth: Santa Cruz de la Sierra, Bolivia
- Height: 1.87 m (6 ft 2 in)
- Position: Centre-back

Team information
- Current team: The Strongest
- Number: 3

Youth career
- 2008–2012: Blooming

Senior career*
| Years | Team | Apps | (Gls) |
| 2012–2016 | Blooming | 64 | (1) |
| 2015–2016 | → Real Potosí (loan) | 38 | (2) |
| 2016–2017 | The Strongest | 5 | (0) |
| 2017–2019 | Bolívar | 55 | (0) |
| 2020–2021 | Barnechea | 47 | (5) |
| 2022 | Atlético Palmaflor | 44 | (4) |
| 2023 | The Strongest | 14 | (1) |
| 2024 | Al-Quwa Al-Jawiya | | |
| 2025– | The Strongest | 24 | (1) |

International career^{‡}
| 2013–2015 | Bolivia U20 | 8 | (0) |
| 2013– | Bolivia | 2 | (0) |
- * Club domestic league appearances and goals as of 30 December 2025 ‡ National team caps and goals as of 17 January 2015

Pablo Elías Pedraza Bustos (born 10 March 1995) is a Bolivian professional footballer who plays for The Strongest.

== Club career ==
In 2008 Pedraza began his career at the youth sector of Club Blooming. During 2011 he started training with the first team, and made his top flight debut the following year. In July 2015, he was hoping to get more playing time; he transferred to Real Potosí as he was unable to secure a place on the first team due to his inexperience.

In 2023, Pedraza had his second stint with The Strongest, winning the Bolivian league title. The next year, he moved to Iraq and joined Al-Quwa Al-Jawiya.

In 2025, Pedraza returned to The Strongest on a two-year deal.

== International career ==
Pedraza was summoned for the Bolivian U-20 team to play in the 2015 South American Youth Football Championship. He was the team captain in the four matches that Bolivia played in the first round of the tournament.

He was named in Bolivia's senior squad for a 2018 FIFA World Cup qualifier against Ecuador in October 2015.
