= Oslimg Mora =

Peruvian footballer (born 1999)

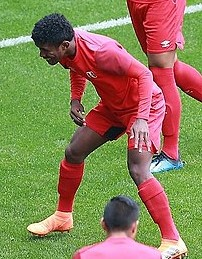
- Mora in 2018

Personal information
- Full name: Oslimg Roberto Mora Pasache
- Date of birth: 2 June 1999 (age 27)
- Place of birth: Pisco, Peru
- Height: 1.73 m (5 ft 8 in)
- Position: Right-back

Team information
- Current team: Sport Boys
- Number: 24

Youth career
- Alianza Lima

Senior career*
Years	Team	Apps	(Gls)
2019–2022	Alianza Lima	63	(3)
2019	→ USMP (loan)	29	(1)
2023–2024	Atlético Grau	37	(3)
2025–	Sport Boys	61	(1)

International career^{‡}
2018–2019	Peru U20	5	(1)
2021–	Peru	7	(0)
- * Club domestic league appearances and goals as of 19 September 2026 ‡ National team caps and goals as of 14 November 2026

Oslimg Roberto Mora Pasache (born 2 June 1999) is a Peruvian professional footballer who plays as a right-back for Peruvian Primera División club Sport Boys and has been a member of the Peru national team since 2021.

== Club career ==
=== Alianza Lima ===
Mora is a product of Alianza Lima. In 2016, he was named the best player of the year by the Peruvian newspaper La Nueve. Mora was promoted to Alianza's first team for the 2018 season but however, he continued to play with the club's reserve team.

He was loaned out to Universidad San Martín for the 2019 season, where he made his break through in Peruvian football, playing 29 games, scoring one goal and three assist on the right winger position.

After returning for the 2020 season following a successful loan spell at San Martín, he signed a new 3-year deal with Alianza. He got his official debut on 1 February 2020 in the first game of the year against Alianza Universidad as a starter. Mora also played the following four games from start and also became the player with most dribble attempts in the 2020 Copa Libertadores.

At the end of April 2020 Mora revealed, that he years ago was forced to reject a trial at Real Madrid because his family couldn't afford to pay for the visa.

=== Atlético Grau ===
On 8 December 2022 Atlético Grau confirmed, that Mora had joined the club, signing a deal until the end of 2023.

In February 2024, in a match against ADT, Mora had an unfortunate accident and tore his ACL, which kept him out for the rest of the year.

=== Sport Boys ===
In late November 2024, ahead of the 2025 season, it was confirmed that Mora was moving to Sport Boys.

== International career ==
In 2017, Mora was a part of the Peruvian U18 national team. In November 2018 he made his debut for the Peruvian U20 national team in a friendly game against Ecuador. He was later called up for the 2019 South American U-20 Championship where he played in all four group games.

He made his debut for the Peru national football team on 10 October 2021 in a World Cup qualifier against Bolivia.

== Career statistics ==
=== Club ===
As of match played on 19 September 2026

Appearances and goals by club, season and competition
Club	Season	League			Cup		League Cup		Continental		Total	
Club	Season	Division	Apps	Goals	Apps	Goals	Apps	Goals	Apps	Goals	Apps	Goals
USMP	2019	Liga 1	29	1	4	0	—		—		33	1
Alianza Lima	2020	Liga 1	23	2	—		—		6	0	29	2
Alianza Lima	2021	Liga 1	24	1	1	0	—		—		25	1
Alianza Lima	2022	Liga 1	16	0	—		—		3	0	19	0
Alianza Lima	Total		63	3	1	0	—		9	0	73	3
Atlético Grau	2023	Liga 1	32	0	—		—		—		32	0
Atlético Grau	2024	Liga 1	5	0	—		—		—		5	0
Atlético Grau	Total		37	0	—		—		—		37	0
Sport Boys	2025	Liga 1	34	0	—		—		—		34	0
Sport Boys	2026	Liga 1	27	1	—		2	0	—		29	1
Sport Boys	Total		61	1	—		2	0	—		63	1
Career total			190	5	5	0	2	0	9	0	206	5

=== International ===
As of match played 13 November 2026

Appearances and goals by national team and year
National team	Year	Apps	Goals
Peru	2021	1	0
Peru	2022	2	0
Peru	2026	4	0
Total		7	0

== Honours ==
Alianza Lima

- Liga 1: 2021, 2022
