= 1983 South American U-20 Championship =

1983 South American Youth Championship
Tournament details
- Host country: Bolivia
- Dates: 22 January – 13 February
- Teams: 10

Final positions
- Champions: Brazil (2nd title)
- Runners-up: Uruguay
- Third place: Argentina
- Fourth place: Bolivia

The South American Youth Championship 1983 was held in Cochabamba, La Paz and Santa Cruz, Bolivia. It also served as qualification for the 1983 FIFA World Youth Championship.

== Teams ==
The following teams entered the tournament:

- Argentina
- Bolivia (host)
- Brazil
- Chile
- Colombia
- Ecuador
- Paraguay
- Peru
- Uruguay
- Venezuela

== First round ==
=== Group A ===
Teams	Pld	W	D	L	GF	GA	GD	Pts
Brazil	4	4	0	0	10	1	+9	8
Uruguay	4	3	0	1	8	7	+1	6
Chile	4	1	0	3	4	6	–2	2
Ecuador	4	1	0	3	6	10	–4	2
Colombia	4	1	0	3	5	9	–4	2

22 January	Colombia	2–1	Chile
	Brazil	3–0	Ecuador
24 January	Uruguay	1–0	Chile
	Brazil	3–0	Colombia
26 January	Chile	3–2	Ecuador
	Uruguay	3–2	Colombia
28 January	Ecuador	2–1	Colombia
	Brazil	3–1	Uruguay
31 January	Uruguay	3–2	Ecuador
	Brazil	1–0	Chile

=== Group B ===
Teams	Pld	W	D	L	GF	GA	GD	Pts
Argentina	4	4	0	0	9	2	+7	8
Bolivia	4	2	0	2	9	7	+2	4
Paraguay	4	2	0	2	7	6	+1	4
Peru	4	1	0	3	11	9	+2	2
Venezuela	4	1	0	3	2	14	–12	2

22 January	Argentina	2–0	Peru
	Bolivia	4–0	Venezuela
24 January	Argentina	2–0	Paraguay
	Bolivia	3–1	Peru
26 January	Paraguay	4–2	Peru
	Argentina	2–1	Venezuela
28 January	Peru	8–0	Venezuela
	Paraguay	3–1	Bolivia
31 January	Venezuela	1–0	Paraguay
	Argentina	3–1	Bolivia

== Final round ==
Teams	Pld	W	D	L	GF	GA	GD	Pts
Brazil	3	2	1	0	6	2	+4	5
Uruguay	3	1	2	0	6	5	+1	4
Argentina	3	1	1	1	8	8	0	3
Bolivia	3	0	0	3	4	9	–5	0

5 February	Brazil	3–0	Bolivia
6 February	Argentina	3–3	Uruguay
9 February	Brazil	0–0	Uruguay
	Argentina	3–2	Bolivia
13 February	Uruguay	3–2	Bolivia
	Brazil	3–2	Argentina

1983 South American Youth Championship

Brazil
Second title

== Qualification to World Youth Championship ==
The three best performing teams qualified for the 1983 FIFA World Youth Championship.

- Argentina
- Brazil
- Uruguay
