= Abraham Bahachille =

Venezuelan footballer (born 2001)

Personal information
- Full name: Abraham Bahachille García
- Date of birth: 8 March 2001 (age 25)
- Place of birth: Caracas, Venezuela
- Height: 1.93 m (6 ft 4 in)
- Position: Midfielder

Team information
- Current team: Carabobo
- Number: 6

Youth career
- Metropolitanos

Senior career*
Years	Team	Apps	(Gls)
2018–2021	Metropolitanos	50	(2)
2023	Deportivo Miranda		
2023–2024	Academia Puerto Cabello	29	(0)
2025	Recreativo Huelva	9	(0)
2025–	Carabobo	4	(0)

International career
2019	Venezuela U20		
2022	Venezuela U21	3	(0)
2023	Venezuela U23	1	(0)
- * Club domestic league appearances and goals as of 14:30, 11 October 2025 (UTC)

Abraham Bahachille García (born 8 March 2001) is a Venezuelan footballer who plays as a midfielder for Carabobo.

== Club career ==
=== Metropolitanos ===
Bahachille joined Metropolitanos FC at the age of 13. Already in 2017, when he was 16 years old, he was training with the clubs first team.

After having been on the bench for two games in October 2018, he got his official debut for the club on 3 March 2019, when he started on the bench against Zulia FC, before replacing Yonder Silva in the 88th minute. Bahachille played 17 games throughout the season, 11 of them in the Venezuelan Primera División.

After a total of four goals in 63 games, Bahachille left Metropolitanos at the end of 2021, as his contract expired.

=== Later career ===
After leaving Metropolitanos, he was linked with a move to American club Portland Timbers. On 26 January 2022, he was also invited to go on a training camp with the club in Tucson, Arizona, which he did. Here he also played a few games, but he was never offered a contract.

After a failed move to MLS, Bahachille appeared on Deportivo Miranda's team sheet. On 20 June 2023, Bahachille joined Venezuelan Primera División side Academia Puerto Cabello.

On 3 January 2025, Bahachille joined Spanish Primera Federación club Recreativo Huelva until 2026. He made his league debut on February 15, 2025 against Algeciras CF.

In August 2025, Bahachille returned to Venezuela, joining Carabobo FC.

== International career ==
In September & November 2019, Bahachille was called up for the Venezuela U20 squad and once again in February 2020.

In June 2021, Bahachille was summoned to the Venezuela national U20 team as one out of 15 'emergency players' after two positive COVID-19 case in the Venezuelan 2021 Copa América squad, since all the members of the original team had to be isolated. In June 2023, he took part in the Maurice Revello Tournament in France with Venezuela.

== Personal life ==
Abraham's family is Basque Venezuelan's.
