= 1964 South American U-20 Championship =

1964 South American Youth Championship
Tournament details
- Host country: Colombia
- Dates: 12 January – 2 February
- Teams: 7
- Venue: 4 (in 4 host cities)

Final positions
- Champions: Uruguay (3rd title)
- Runners-up: Paraguay
- Third place: Colombia
- Fourth place: Chile

Tournament statistics
- Matches played: 21
- Goals scored: 40 (1.9 per match)
- Top scorer: (Chile) Jaime Bravo (5)

The South American Youth Championship 1964 was held in Barranquilla, Bogotá, Cali and Medellín, Colombia.

== Teams ==
The following teams entered the tournament:

- Argentina
- Chile
- Colombia (host)
- Paraguay
- Peru
- Uruguay
- Venezuela

== Matches ==
Teams	Pld	W	D	L	GF	GA	GD	Pts
Uruguay	6	4	1	1	8	5	+3	9
Paraguay	6	3	1	2	6	4	+2	7
Colombia	6	2	3	1	6	5	+1	7
Chile	6	2	3	1	6	6	0	7
Peru	6	2	1	3	7	9	–2	5
Argentina	6	1	2	3	4	5	–1	4
Venezuela	6	0	3	3	3	6	–3	3

12 January	Argentina	0–1	Paraguay
	Chile	1–1	Uruguay
	Colombia	1–1	Venezuela
15 January	Argentina	2–0	Chile
	Uruguay	2–1	Venezuela
	Colombia	2–1	Peru
19 January	Argentina	0–1	Uruguay
	Colombia	0–0	Paraguay
	Chile	2–1	Peru
22 January	Argentina	0–0	Venezuela
	Chile	2–1	Paraguay
	Peru	2–1	Uruguay
26 January	Colombia	2–1	Argentina
	Paraguay	2–0	Peru
	Chile	0–0	Venezuela
29 January	Colombia	1–1	Chile
	Uruguay	2–1	Paraguay
	Peru	2–1	Venezuela
2 February	Argentina	1–1	Peru
	Paraguay	1–0	Venezuela
	Uruguay	1–0	Colombia

1964 South American Youth Championship

Uruguay
Third title
