= Nathaniel Revetria =

Mexican-Uruguayan footballer and coach (born 1981)

Personal information
- Full name: Nathaniel Revetria Soñora
- Date of birth: 29 June 1981 (age 45)
- Place of birth: Tampico, Mexico
- Height: 1.82 m (6 ft 0 in)
- Position: Striker

Senior career*
Years	Team	Apps	(Gls)
2001–2002	Defensor Sporting		
2002–2003	Juventud		
2004	San Luis		
2005	Defensor Sporting		
2006	Cultural Leonesa		
2007	Alcorcón		
2007–2009	River Plate Montevideo	19	(1)
2009–2010	Sport Ancash	5	(0)

Managerial career
- 2017: Fénix (assistant)
- 2017–2018: Fénix
- 2020: Cerro
- * Club domestic league appearances and goals

Nathaniel Revetria Soñora (born June 29, 1981, in Tampico, Mexico), is a retired Mexican-Uruguayan footballer. He is currently the head coach of Centro Atlético Fénix.

== Career ==
Nathaniel started his career in Defensor Sporting, a team based in Montevideo, Uruguay. Since 2001 until 2002 he took part in Uruguay First Division playing for the before-mentioned team. He also played for Juventud until 2003 and then returned to Mexico to play for San Luis F.C. in Liga MX México Primera División during 2004.

During 2006, Nathaniel played for Cultural Leonesa and participated in the Spanish Segunda División B (the third level of football in Spain).

== Personal ==
Revetria's father, Hebert, is a former Uruguay international footballer.
