= 1987 South American U-20 Championship =

1987 South American Youth Championship
Tournament details
- Host country: Colombia
- Dates: 23 January – 8 February
- Teams: 9

Final positions
- Champions: Colombia (1st title)
- Runners-up: Brazil
- Third place: Argentina
- Fourth place: Uruguay

The South American Youth Championship 1987 was held in Armenia, Manizales and Pereira, Colombia. It also served as qualification for the 1987 FIFA World Youth Championship.

== Teams ==
The following teams entered the tournament:

- Argentina
- Bolivia
- Brazil
- Chile
- Colombia (host)
- Ecuador
- Paraguay
- Peru
- Uruguay

== First round ==
=== Group A ===
Teams	Pld	W	D	L	GF	GA	GD	Pts
Argentina	3	2	1	0	4	2	+2	5
Brazil	3	2	0	1	7	2	+5	4
Ecuador	3	1	1	1	2	3	–1	3
Peru	3	0	0	3	4	10	–6	0

23 January	Brazil	2–0	Ecuador
24 January	Argentina	3–2	Peru
26 January	Argentina	0–0	Ecuador
28 January	Ecuador	2–1	Peru
30 January	Argentina	1–0	Brazil
1 February	Brazil	5–1	Peru

=== Group B ===
Teams	Pld	W	D	L	GF	GA	GD	Pts
Uruguay	4	4	0	0	10	3	+7	8
Colombia	4	2	0	2	8	2	+6	4
Chile	4	2	0	2	9	9	0	4
Paraguay	4	2	0	2	7	9	–2	4
Bolivia	4	0	0	4	4	15	–11	0

24 January	Chile	3–1	Bolivia
25 January	Colombia	0–1	Uruguay
27 January	Paraguay	3–1	Bolivia
	Uruguay	2–1	Chile
29 January	Chile	5–3	Paraguay
	Colombia	5–0	Bolivia
31 January	Bolivia	2–4	Uruguay
	Colombia	0–1	Paraguay
2 February	Uruguay	3–0	Paraguay
	Colombia	3–0	Chile

== Final round ==
Teams	Pld	W	D	L	GF	GA	GD	Pts
Colombia	3	2	1	0	3	0	+3	5
Brazil	3	1	2	0	4	2	+2	4
Argentina	3	1	0	2	5	7	–2	2
Uruguay	3	0	1	2	3	6	–3	1

4 February	Colombia	2–0	Argentina
	Uruguay	1–1	Brazil
6 February	Colombia	1–0	Uruguay
	Brazil	3–1	Argentina
8 February	Argentina	4–2	Uruguay
	Colombia	0–0	Brazil

1987 South American Youth Championship

Colombia
First title

== Qualification to World Youth Championship ==
The two best performing teams qualified for the 1987 FIFA World Youth Championship.

- Brazil
- Chile (host)
- Colombia
