= South American Youth Football Championship =

CONMEBOL Sub 20
- Organizer(s): CONMEBOL
- Founded: 1954; 72 years ago
- Region: South America
- Teams: 10
- Qualifier for: FIFA U-20 World Cup; Pan American Games
- Related competitions: CONMEBOL Sub 20 Femenina; CONMEBOL Sub 17; CONMEBOL Sub 15
- Current champion: Brazil (13th title)
- Most championships: Brazil (13 titles)
- Website: conmebol.com/sub20
- 2027 CONMEBOL Sub 20

The South American Youth Football Championship, (Note: also known as South American U-20 Championship (Spanish: Campeonato Sudamericano Sub 20; Portuguese: Campeonato Sul-Americano Sub-20)) branded as CONMEBOL Sub 20, is a South American football tournament organized by the CONMEBOL for South American national teams of men under age of 20. This tournament also serves as qualification for the FIFA U-20 World Cup and the Pan American Games, and from 2007 to 2015, also for the Summer Olympic Games.

The first South American Youth Championship was hosted by Venezuela from 22 March to 13 April 1954. Initially played as an under-19 tournament, it became an under-20 event from 1977. Brazil has won the tournament on the most occasions (13 times).

All matches take place in the host country, and all ten U-20 national football teams of CONMEBOL compete in every edition (if none of the associations withdraw). They are separated in two groups of five, and each team plays four matches in a pure round-robin stage. The three top competitors advance to a single final group of six, wherein each team plays five matches. The results in this last pure round-robin stage determines the champion and the South American qualification to the next FIFA U-20 World Cup. Unlike most international tournaments, in South American Youth Championships there is neither final match nor third place match nor knockout stages.

== Results ==
Keys

- 1954–75: U-19 teams
- 1977–present: U-20 teams

Ed.	Year	Host	(gold) Winners	(silver) Runners-up	(bronze) Third place	Fourth place	Teams
1	1954	Venezuela	Uruguay	Brazil	Venezuela	Peru	9
2	1958	Chile	Uruguay	Argentina	Brazil	Peru	6
3	1964	Colombia	Uruguay	Paraguay	Colombia	Chile	7
4	1967	Paraguay	Argentina	Paraguay	Brazil	Peru	9
5	1971	Paraguay	Paraguay	Uruguay	Argentina	Peru	9
6	1974	Chile	Brazil	Uruguay	Paraguay	Argentina	9
7	1975	Peru	Uruguay	Chile	Argentina	Peru	6
8	1977	Venezuela	Uruguay	Brazil	Paraguay	Chile	9
9	1979	Uruguay	Uruguay	Argentina	Paraguay	Brazil	9
10	1981	Ecuador	Uruguay	Brazil	Argentina	Bolivia	9
11	1983	Bolivia	Brazil	Uruguay	Argentina	Bolivia	10
12	1985	Paraguay	Brazil	Paraguay	Colombia	Uruguay	10
13	1987	Colombia	Colombia	Brazil	Argentina	Uruguay	9
14	1988	Argentina	Brazil	Colombia	Argentina	Paraguay	11
15	1991	Venezuela	Brazil	Argentina	Uruguay	Paraguay	10
16	1992	Colombia	Brazil	Uruguay	Colombia	Ecuador	8
17	1995	Bolivia	Brazil	Argentina	Chile	Ecuador	9
18	1997	Chile	Argentina	Brazil	Paraguay	Uruguay	10
19	1999	Argentina	Argentina	Uruguay	Brazil	Paraguay	10
20	2001	Ecuador	Brazil	Argentina	Paraguay	Chile	10
21	2003	Uruguay	Argentina	Brazil	Paraguay	Colombia	10
22	2005	Colombia	Colombia	Brazil	Argentina	Chile	10
23	2007	Paraguay	Brazil	Argentina	Uruguay	Chile	10
24	2009	Venezuela	Brazil	Paraguay	Uruguay	Venezuela	10
25	2011	Peru	Brazil	Uruguay	Argentina	Ecuador	10
26	2013	Argentina	Colombia	Paraguay	Uruguay	Chile	10
27	2015	Uruguay	Argentina	Colombia	Uruguay	Brazil	10
28	2017	Ecuador	Uruguay	Ecuador	Venezuela	Argentina	10
29	2019	Chile	Ecuador	Argentina	Uruguay	Colombia	10
30	2023	Colombia	Brazil	Uruguay	Colombia	Ecuador	10
31	2025	Venezuela	Brazil	Argentina	Colombia	Paraguay	10
32	2027	Colombia					10

== Performances by countries ==
Team	Titles	Runner-up	Third place	Fourth place
Brazil	13 (1974, 1983, 1985, 1988, 1991, 1992, 1995, 2001, 2007, 2009, 2011, 2023, 2025)	7 (1954, 1977, 1981, 1987, 1997, 2003, 2005)	3 (1958, 1967, 1999)	2 (1979, 2015)
Uruguay	8 (1954, 1958, 1964, 1975, 1977, 1979, 1981, 2017)	7 (1971, 1974, 1983, 1992, 1999, 2011, 2023)	6 (1991, 2007, 2009, 2013, 2015*, 2019)	3 (1985, 1987, 1997)
Argentina	5 (1967, 1997, 1999, 2003, 2015)	8 (1958, 1979, 1991, 1995, 2001, 2007, 2019, 2025)	8 (1971, 1975, 1981, 1983, 1987, 1988, 2005, 2011)	2 (1974, 2017)
Colombia	3 (1987, 2005, 2013)	2 (1988, 2015)	5 (1964, 1985, 1992, 2023, 2025)	2 (2003, 2019)
Paraguay	1 (1971)	5 (1964, 1967, 1985, 2009, 2013)	6 (1974, 1977, 1979, 1997, 2001, 2003)	4 (1988, 1991, 1999, 2025)
Ecuador	1 (2019)	1 (2017)		4 (1992, 1995, 2011, 2023)
Chile		1 (1975)	1 (1995)	6 (1964, 1977, 2001, 2005, 2007, 2013)
Venezuela			2 (1954, 2017)	1 (2009*)
Peru				5 (1954, 1958, 1967, 1971, 1975)
Bolivia				2 (1981, 1983*)

== Top goalscorers ==
Competition	Nation	Player	Number of goals
1954	Paraguay	Juan Bautista Agüero	7
1958	Argentina	Norberto Raffo	5
1964	Chile	Jaime Bravo	5
1967	Argentina	Carlos Garcia Cambon	3
1971	Uruguay	Ricardo Islas	4
1971	Paraguay	Cristóbal Maldonado	4
1974	Uruguay	Hebert Revetria	8
1975	Uruguay	Hebert Revetria	5
1975	Brazil	Toninho Vanusa (pt)	5
1977	Uruguay	Amaro Nadal (fr)	4
1977	Brazil	Guinha	4
1979	Uruguay	Arsenio Luzardo	4
1981	Uruguay	Enzo Francescoli	5
1981	Brazil	Lela	5
1983	Uruguay	Carlos Aguilera	7
1985	Brazil	Romário	4
1987	Argentina	Alejandro Russo	4
1988	Brazil	Assís	5
1988	Paraguay	Ferreira	5
1991	Argentina	Juan Esnáider	7
1992	Uruguay	Fernando Correa	5
1995	Argentina	Leonardo Biagini	4
1997	Brazil	Adaílton	8
1999	Argentina	Luciano Galletti	9
2001	Brazil	Adriano	6
2001	Brazil	Ewerthon	6
2003	Argentina	Fernando Cavenaghi	8
2005	Colombia	Hugo Rodallega	11
2007	Uruguay	Edinson Cavani	7
2009	Paraguay	Hernán Pérez	5
2009	Paraguay	Robin Ramírez	5
2009	Uruguay	Abel Hernández	5
2009	Brazil	Walter	5
2011	Brazil	Neymar	9
2013	Uruguay	Nicolás López	6
2015	Argentina	Giovanni Simeone	9
2017	Uruguay	Rodrigo Amaral	5
2017	Ecuador	Bryan Cabezas	5
2017	Argentina	Lautaro Martínez	5
2017	Argentina	Marcelo Torres	5
2019	Ecuador	Leonardo Campana	6
2023	Brazil	Vitor Roque	6
2023	Brazil	Andrey Santos	6
2025	Colombia	Néiser Villarreal	8

Source: RSSSF.

== FIFA U-20 World Cup Performances of Qualified South American teams ==
Legend

- 1st – Champions
- 2nd – Runners-up
- 3rd – Third place
- 4th – Fourth place
- QF – Quarterfinals
- R2 – Round 2
- R1 – Round 1
- – Hosts
- Q – Qualified for upcoming tournament

Team	(Tunisia) 1977	(Japan) 1979	(Australia) 1981	(Mexico) 1983	(Soviet Union) 1985	(Chile) 1987	(Saudi Arabia) 1989	(Portugal) 1991	(Australia) 1993	(Qatar) 1995	(Malaysia) 1997	(Nigeria) 1999	(Argentina) 2001	(United Arab Emirates) 2003	(Netherlands) 2005	(Canada) 2007	(Egypt) 2009	(Colombia) 2011	(Turkey) 2013	(New Zealand) 2015	(South Korea) 2017	(Poland) 2019	(Argentina) 2023	(Chile) 2025	(Azerbaijan) (Uzbekistan) 2027	(Armenia) (Georgia (country)) 2029	Total
Argentina		1st	R1	2nd			QF	R1		1st	1st	R2	1st	4th	1st	1st		QF		R1	R1	R2	R2	2nd			18
Brazil	3rd		QF	1st	1st	QF	3rd	2nd	1st	2nd	QF	QF	QF	1st	3rd	R2	2nd	1st		2nd			QF	R1			20
Chile						4th				R1			R1		R2	3rd			QF					R2			7
Colombia					QF	R1	QF		R1					3rd	R2			QF	R2	R2		QF	QF	3rd			12
Ecuador													R2					R2			R1	3rd	R2				5
Paraguay	R1	QF			R1						R1	R2	4th	R2			R2		R2					R2			10
Uruguay	4th	3rd	QF	QF				R1	QF		2nd	4th				R2	R2	R1	2nd	R2	4th	R2	1st				16
Venezuela																	R2				2nd						2

== See also ==
- South American U-17 Championship
- South American U-15 Championship
