= 1971 South American U-20 Championship =

1971 South American Youth Championship
Tournament details
- Host country: Paraguay
- Dates: 1–25 March
- Teams: 9

Final positions
- Champions: Paraguay (1st title)
- Runners-up: Uruguay

The South American Youth Championship 1971 was held in Asunción, Paraguay.

== Teams ==
The following teams entered the tournament:

- Argentina
- Bolivia
- Brazil
- Chile
- Colombia
- Paraguay (host)
- Peru
- Uruguay
- Venezuela

== Group stage ==
=== Group A ===
Teams	Pld	W	D	L	GF	GA	GD	Pts
Argentina	4	3	0	1	6	1	+5	6
Peru	4	2	1	1	6	4	+2	5
Brazil	4	2	0	2	7	3	+4	4
Venezuela	4	1	2	1	7	10	–3	4
Colombia	4	0	1	3	2	10	–8	1

1 March	Colombia	2–2	Venezuela
	Argentina	1–0	Peru
4 March	Brazil	5–1	Venezuela
7 March	Argentina	4–0	Colombia
10 March	Venezuela	3–3	Peru
	Brazil	2–0	Colombia
14 March	Colombia	0–2	Peru
	Argentina	1–0	Brazil
17 March	Brazil	0–1	Peru
	Argentina	0–1	Venezuela

=== Group B ===
Teams	Pld	W	D	L	GF	GA	GD	Pts
Paraguay	3	2	1	0	6	2	+4	5
Uruguay	3	2	0	1	6	4	+2	4
Chile	3	1	1	1	3	4	–1	3
Bolivia	3	0	0	3	4	9	–5	0

4 March	Uruguay	2–0	Chile
7 March	Paraguay	3–1	Bolivia
13 March	Uruguay	4–2	Bolivia
	Paraguay	1–1	Chile
17 March	Bolivia	1–2	Chile
18 March	Paraguay	2–0	Uruguay

== Semifinals ==
22 March 1971

Argentina	1 – 2	Uruguay

Asunción
22 March 1971

Paraguay	3 – 1	Peru
Diarte; Aifuch; Maldonado

Asunción

== Final ==
25 March 1971

Paraguay	1 – 1 Paraguay win based on goal difference in semifinal	Uruguay
Cino		Islas 21'

Asunción

1971 South American Youth Championship

Paraguay
First title
