= 1975 South American U-20 Championship =

1975 South American Youth Championship
Tournament details
- Host country: Peru
- Dates: 9–26 August
- Teams: 6 (from 1 confederation)
- Venue: (in Lima host cities)

Final positions
- Champions: Uruguay (4th title)
- Runners-up: Chile
- Third place: Argentina
- Fourth place: Peru

Tournament statistics
- Matches played: 16
- Goals scored: 37 (2.31 per match)
- Top scorer(s): (Uruguay) Hebert Revetria (Brazil) Toninho Vanusa (5 goals each)

The South American Youth Championship 1975 was held in Lima, Peru, from August 9 to 26.

== Teams ==
The following teams entered the tournament:

- Argentina
- Bolivia
- Brazil (holders)
- Chile
- Peru (host)
- Uruguay

== Group stage ==
Teams	Pld	W	D	L	GF	GA	GD	Pts
Uruguay	5	3	2	0	8	2	+6	8
Chile	5	3	2	0	6	0	+6	8
Argentina	5	2	2	1	7	6	+1	6
Peru (H)	5	1	2	2	4	8	–4	4
Brazil	5	1	0	4	6	7	–1	2
Bolivia	5	0	2	3	4	12	–8	2

9 August

Peru	2–2	Bolivia
Zuloaga 21' (pen.) Lazón	Report	Reynaldo (pen.) Castro (o.g.)

Estadio Nacional, Lima
Referee: Oscar Scolfaro (Brazil)

10 August

Chile	1–0	Brazil
Vargas	Report

Lima
10 August

Argentina	1–1	Uruguay
Sánchez	Report	Revetria

Estadio Nacional, Lima

13 August

Brazil	5–1	Bolivia

Lima
13 August

Chile	3–0	Argentina
Palma 37' Soto 50' Romo 77'	Report

Estadio Nacional, Lima
13 August

Uruguay	3–0	Peru
Revetria Muniz Ortiz	Report

Lima

16 August

Uruguay	2–1	Bolivia
Revetria	Report

Lima
16 August

Chile	2–0	Peru
Moscoso 44', 69'	Report

Lima
16 August

Argentina	2–1	Brazil
Fortunato Brítez	Report

Estadio Nacional, Lima

19 August

Argentina	3–0	Bolivia
Fernández Fortunato Brítez	Report

Estadio Nacional, Lima
19 August

Peru	1–0	Brazil
Kulisic 41'	Report

Estadio Nacional, Lima
19 August

Chile	0–0	Uruguay

Lima

22 August

Argentina	1–1	Peru
Salinas	Report	Kulisic

Estadio Nacional, Lima

23 August

Bolivia	0–0	Chile

Lima
23 August

Uruguay	2–0	Brazil
Carrasco Revetria	Report

Lima

== Final ==
26 August 1975

Uruguay	1–1	Chile
Umpiérrez 17'	Report	González 70'
Penalties
Ortiz (penalty scored); Pierri (penalty scored); Carrasco (penalty missed); Revetria (penalty scored)	3–1	(penalty missed) Palma; (penalty missed) Vergara; (penalty missed) Wirth; (penalty scored) Bahamondes

Estadio Nacional, Lima

== Winners ==
1975 South American Youth Championship

Uruguay
Fourth title

== Top goalscorers ==
Team	Players	Goals
(Uruguay)	Hebert Revetria	5
(Brazil)	Toninho Vanusa (pt)	5
