= Hebert Revetria =

Uruguayan footballer (born 1955)

Personal information
- Full name: Hebert Carlos Revetria Acevedo
- Date of birth: 27 August 1955 (age 71)
- Place of birth: Montevideo, Uruguay
- Position: Forward

Senior career*
Years	Team	Apps	(Gls)
1972–1976	Nacional	160	(88)
1977–1978	Cruzeiro	63	(22)
1979–1981	Tampico	66	(31)
1981–1982	Deportivo Neza	40	(25)
1982–1983	Tecos	22	(3)
1983–1984	Tampico Madero	8	(3)
1984	Deportes Tolima	21	(7)
1984–1985	Peñarol	37	(8)
1986	Colo-Colo	18	(3)
1987–1988	Cobreloa	12	(2)
1989–1990	River Plate Montevideo		

International career
- Uruguay
- * Club domestic league appearances and goals

Hebert Carlos Revetria Acevedo (born 27 August 1955) known simply as Revetria, is a Uruguayan former footballer who played as a forward.

== Career ==
Revetria began playing football with Club Nacional de Football. He is known for his hat-trick, in the finals of the Campeonato Mineiro in 1977, against Atlético Mineiro with Cruzeiro EC.

From 1986 to 1987, Revetria played in Chile for Colo-Colo and Cobreloa.

At international level, Revetria made several appearances for the Uruguay national football team, seven before he was age 21, and played in the 1975 Copa América.

Now retired, he works at Tenfield.

== Personal ==
Revetria's son, Nathaniel, is also a professional footballer.
