= Bolivia national under-20 football team =

National association football team

Bolivia
- Nickname: La Verde (The Green One)
- Association: Federación Boliviana de Fútbol
- Confederation: CONMEBOL (South America)
- Head coach: Jorge Perrotta
- Captain: Pablo Pedraza
- Home stadium: Estadio Hernando Siles de La Paz
- FIFA code: BOL
First colours	Second colours

First international
- None, No years ago
- Best result: Fourth Place 2 times (1981, 1983)

Bolivia national under-20 football team represents Bolivia in international football competitions such as South American Youth Championship.

== Honours ==
- South American Games
  - Bronze medal (1): 1978
