= Paraguay national under-20 football team =

National youth association football team

Paraguay
- Nickname: Albirrojita
- Association: Asociación Paraguaya de Fútbol
- Confederation: CONMEBOL (South America)
- Head coach: (Paraguay) Antolín Alcaraz
- Captain: Gustavo Gómez
- FIFA code: PAR
First colours	Second colours

First international
- NA
- Best result: FIFA U-20 World Cup; Fourth Place, 1 time (2001); South American Youth Football Championship; Champions, 1 time (1971)

Paraguay national under-20 football team represents Paraguay in international football competitions such as FIFA U-20 World Cup and South American Youth Football Championship.

The team's most successful period was mostly during 2001 to 2003 and once again in 2006, achieving Fourth place at the 2001 FIFA World Youth Championship before winning back-to-back tournaments at the Milk Cup in 2002 and 2003 and once again in 2006. Paraguay also won the 2002 SBS Cup disputed in Shizuoka Japan.

== Overview ==
The under-20 Paraguay national football team has featured many of Paraguay's most prominent players such as Juan Bautista Agüero, Julio César Romero, Roberto Cabañas, Paulo Da Silva, Justo Villar, Salvador Cabañas and Roque Santa Cruz.

The team has participated in 10 events of the FIFA World Youth Championship and the best performance came in the 2001 World Cup held in Argentina, when Paraguay finished in the fourth place. The best performance at the South American level came in 1971 when they won the South American Youth Football Championship (also known as "Juventud de América"), along with four runners-up finishes in 1964, 1967, 1985 and 2009.

Paraguay has qualified for 2009 FIFA U-20 World Cup that was held in Egypt.

Current talents for the Paraguay squad include Hernán Pérez, Robin Ramírez, Nicolás Martínez, Federico Santander and Joel Silva.

== Tournament records ==
=== FIFA U-20 World Cup ===
FIFA U-20 World Cup
Hosts / Year	Result	GP	W	D	L	GS	GA
(Tunisia) 1977	Group stage	3	2	0	1	6	2
(Japan) 1979	Quarter-finals	4	2	1	1	8	3
(Australia) 1981	Did not qualify						
(Mexico) 1983	Did not qualify						
(Soviet Union) 1985	Group stage	3	0	1	2	3	6
(Chile) 1987	Did not qualify						
(Saudi Arabia) 1989	Did not qualify						
(Portugal) 1991	Did not qualify						
(Australia) 1993	Did not qualify						
(Qatar) 1995	Did not qualify						
(Malaysia) 1997	Group stage	3	0	2	1	5	6
(Nigeria) 1999	Round of 16	4	2	1	1	7	8
(Argentina) 2001	Fourth place	7	3	1	3	8	11
(United Arab Emirates) 2003	Round of 16	4	2	0	2	4	4
(Netherlands) 2005	Did not qualify						
(Canada) 2007	Did not qualify						
(Egypt) 2009	Round of 16	4	1	2	1	2	4
(Colombia) 2011	Did not qualify						
(Turkey) 2013	Round of 16	4	1	2	1	3	3
(New Zealand) 2015	Did not qualify						
(South Korea) 2017	Did not qualify						
(Poland) 2019	Did not qualify						
(Argentina) 2023	Did not qualify						
(Chile) 2025	Round of 16	4	1	1	2	4	5
(Azerbaijan) (Uzbekistan) 2027	To be determined						
(Armenia) (Georgia (country)) 2029	To be determined						
Total	10/26	40	14	11	15	50	52

== Current squad ==
Paraguay announced their final 21-player squad on 19 September 2025 for the 2025 FIFA U-20 World Cup.

No.	Pos.	Player	Date of birth (age)	Club
1	GK	Facundo Insfrán	4 May 2006 (aged 19)	(Paraguayan Football Association) Olimpia
2	DF	Líder Cáceres	8 February 2005 (aged 20)	(Paraguayan Football Association) Tembetary
3	DF	Axel Balbuena	10 March 2006 (aged 19)	(Argentine Football Association) Lanús
4	DF	Alexandro Maidana	26 July 2005 (aged 20)	(Paraguayan Football Association) Guaraní
5	DF	Lucas Quintana	2 January 2005 (aged 20)	(Paraguayan Football Association) Cerro Porteño
6	MF	Fabrizio Baruja	12 August 2006 (aged 19)	(Paraguayan Football Association) Olimpia
7	FW	Gabriel Aguayo	10 February 2005 (aged 20)	(Paraguayan Football Association) Cerro Porteño
8	MF	Osmar Giménez	25 March 2007 (aged 18)	(Paraguayan Football Association) General Caballero
9	FW	Tiago Caballero	27 May 2005 (aged 20)	(Paraguayan Football Association) Olimpia
10	FW	Enso González	20 January 2005 (aged 20)	(The Football Association) Wolverhampton Wanderers
11	FW	César Miño	31 May 2007 (aged 18)	(Paraguayan Football Association) Guaraní
12	GK	Víctor Rojas	1 February 2005 (aged 20)	(Paraguayan Football Association) Libertad
13	MF	Giovanni Gómez	18 October 2007 (aged 17)	(Paraguayan Football Association) Guaraní
14	DF	Tobías Morinigo	22 September 2005 (aged 20)	(Paraguayan Football Association) Olimpia
15	MF	Gadiel Paoli	1 October 2005 (aged 19)	(Argentine Football Association) Boca Juniors
16	MF	Octavio Alfonso	19 December 2005 (aged 19)	(Paraguayan Football Association) Guaraní
17	FW	Rodrigo Villalba	2 March 2006 (aged 19)	(Paraguayan Football Association) Libertad
18	MF	Lucas Guiñazú	25 August 2006 (aged 19)	(Paraguayan Football Association) Tembetary
19	FW	David Fernández	5 January 2006 (aged 19)	(Paraguayan Football Association) Sol de América
20	DF	Ezequiel Duarte	2 September 2006 (aged 19)	(Argentine Football Association) Independiente
21	GK	Francisco Hanson	16 February 2005 (aged 20)	(Paraguayan Football Association) Sportivo Luqueño

== Head-to-head record ==
The following table shows Paraguay's head-to-head record in the FIFA U-20 World Cup.

Opponent	Pld	W	D	L	GF	GA	GD	Win %
Argentina	1	0	0	1	0	5	−5	0.00
Austria	1	1	0	0	1	0	+1	100.00
Canada	1	1	0	0	3	0	+3	100.00
China	1	0	0	1	1	2	−1	0.00
Costa Rica	2	1	1	0	4	2	+2	50.00
Czech Republic	1	1	0	0	1	0	+1	100.00
England	1	0	1	0	2	2	+0	0.00
Egypt	2	1	0	1	2	2	+0	50.00
France	1	0	1	0	2	2	+0	0.00
Germany	2	1	0	1	2	4	−2	50.00
Ghana	1	0	0	1	1	2	−1	0.00
Greece	1	0	1	0	1	1	+0	0.00
Iran	1	1	0	0	2	0	+2	100.00
Iraq	2	1	0	1	4	1	+3	50.00
Italy	1	0	1	0	0	0	+0	0.00
Japan	1	0	1	0	3	3	+0	0.00
Mali	1	0	1	0	1	1	+0	0.00
Mexico	2	1	0	1	1	2	−1	50.00
Nigeria	1	1	0	0	2	1	+1	100.00
Norway	1	0	0	1	0	1	−1	0.00
Panama	1	1	0	0	3	2	+1	100.00
Portugal	1	0	0	1	0	1	−1	0.00
South Korea	4	2	1	1	4	3	+1	50.00
Soviet Union	2	0	1	1	3	4	−1	0.00
Spain	2	0	0	2	1	3	−2	0.00
Trinidad and Tobago	1	0	1	0	0	0	+0	0.00
Ukraine	2	1	0	1	3	3	+0	50.00
United States	1	0	0	1	1	3	−2	0.00
Uruguay	1	0	1	0	2	2	+0	0.00
Total	39	14	11	14	50	51	−1	35.90

== See also ==
- Paraguay national football team
- Paraguay national under-23 football team
- Paraguay national under-17 football team
- Paraguay women's national under-20 football team
- Football in Paraguay
