= List of killings by law enforcement officers in the United States, March 2021 =

This is a list of people reported killed by non-military law enforcement officers in the United States in March 2021, whether in the line of duty or not, and regardless of reason or method. The listing documents the occurrence of a death, making no implications regarding wrongdoing or justification on the part of the person killed or officer involved. Killings are arranged by date of the incident that caused death. Different death dates, if known, are noted in the description. The table below lists 57 people.

== March 2021 ==
Date	Name (age) of deceased	Race	State (city)	Description
2021-03-31	Jeffrey Ely (40)	White	New Hampshire (Claremont)	According to the New Hampshire Attorney General office, Claremont police and New Hampshire State Police SWAT responded to a "barricaded male" and gunfire was exchanged, killing Ely and injuring no others.
2021-03-31	Ivan Cuevas (27)	Hispanic	California (Visalia)	
2021-03-31	Willie Roy Allen (57)	Black	Georgia (Lithonia)	
2021-03-31	Aaron Christopher Pouche (35)	Unknown race	Missouri (Independence)	
2021-03-31	Lance Montgomery Powell (60)	White	California (Barstow)	
2021-03-31	Anthony Alvarez (22)	Hispanic	Illinois (Chicago)	According to the Chicago Police Department, an officer shot Alvarez during a foot chase when Alvarez pulled out a gun. Alvarez needed a tourniquet and CPR on scene and was transported to the Advocate Illinois Masonic Medical Center where he died.
2021-03-30	Jonathen Kohler (31)	White	Virginia (Bristol)	Responding to reports of gunshots, police arrived at a motel where they met Kohler in his car. Initially, the Virginia State Police said that Kohler had attempted to hit an officer with his vehicle, causing police to shoot. In a later news release, State Police said Kohler was actually attempting to leave the parking lot when he was shot. On May 4, Bristol Police officer Jonathan Brown was charged with murder.
2021-03-29	Adam Toledo (13)	Hispanic	Illinois (Chicago)	In the Little Village neighborhood of Chicago, officers responded to a ShotSpotter report and encountered Toledo, who police say was armed and fled from police with a known gang member. Toledo was shot and police released a photo of a gun allegedly recovered from the scene. Police bodycam footage showed that Toledo was not holding a weapon when he was shot, and was raising his hands in the air.
2021-03-27	Donovon W. Lynch (25)	Black	Virginia (Virginia Beach)	Lynch was shot and killed by a Virginia Beach police officer. According to the officers involved, Lynch had a handgun. Lynch was the cousin of Pharrell Williams.
2021-03-26	Eric Leach (36)	White	Massachusetts (Quincy)	Leach was shot and killed by police after an armed robbery, standoff, and chase.
2021-03-25	Travon Chadwell (18)	Unknown race	Illinois (Chicago)	
2021-03-24	Tony Smith Jr. (35)	Unknown	Illinois (Forest Park)	After police received calls of a man who dropped a pistol on the floor of a Jimmy John's, a patrol officer and sergeant arrived at the scene and fired shots at Smith, who was pronounced dead at Loyola University Medical Center.
2021-03-24	Joshua James Gloria (34)	Hispanic	California (Fremont)	A person was shot and killed by a Fremont police officer on SR 84. Police said the person was in possession of a firearm.
2021-03-21	Eduardo Parra (24)	Hispanic	Ohio (Sylvania Township)	Parra was unarmed when he was shot three times and killed by police.
2021-03-20	Mykel Dexter Jenkins (29)	White	Tennessee (Chattanooga)	Chattanooga Police responded to a report of a domestic disorder where Jenkins was destroying a room. Police allege Jenkins exhibited erratic and agitated behavior, and did not respond to multiple attempts at de-escalation. Jenkins was shot when he "produced a deadly weapon fashioned to look and function as a knife".
2021-03-18	Leonard Popa (79)	White	Maryland (Pasadena)	Popa was shot twice and killed by officer Tyler Brennan after police responded to a report that Popa was threatening to take his own life.
2021-03-16	Jorge Armando Cerda (36)	Hispanic	California (Los Angeles)	
2021-03-16	Joseph Spencer (22)	White	Utah (Provo)	
2021-03-15	Stephen James Hughes (62)	White	Pennsylvania (Temple)	
2021-03-14	Marvin Scott (26)	Black	Texas (McKinney)	Scott died in law enforcement custody at a corrections facility. An independent autopsy determined the cause of death as asphyxiation by physical restraint.
2021-03-14	David Ordaz Jr. (34)	Unknown	California (East Los Angeles)	Police responded to reports that Ordaz was holding a knife. After being hit with non lethal rounds, Ordaz stumbled towards family and sheriff's deputies, and deputies fired. According to the county coroner, 12 shots were fired in total, and all except two hit him in the back. In 2022 a deputy who shot Ordaz as he was lying on the ground, having already been shot by other deputies, was charged with assault with a semiautomatic firearm and assault under color of authority.
2021-03-14	Christopher Ruffin (28)	Black	Florida (Palm Bay)	
2021-03-14	Ryan White Mountain-Soft (30)	Native American	South Dakota (McLaughlin)	
2021-03-14	Angel B. Degollado (21)	Hispanic	Texas (Laredo)	
2021-03-13	Dustin Black (24)	White	Arkansas (Austin)	
2021-03-13	Douglas Stroble (25)	White	Alaska (Wasilla)	
2021-03-13	Kelly Shannon Bowen (51)	White	Georgia (Reidsville)	
2021-03-13	Charles Ray Phillips (51)	Black	Texas (Monahans)	
2021-03-12	Timothy Jonas Johnson (33)	Unknown race	Missouri (Kimberling City)	
2021-03-12	Benjamin Price Cotton (24)	White	Ohio (Dayton)	
2021-03-12	Nika Nicole Holbert (31)	Black	Tennessee (Nashville)	
2021-03-12	Raymond Tarbox II (43)	White	Georgia (Valdosta)	
2021-03-11	Tyrell Wilson (32)	Black	California (Danville)	Wilson was being investigated for throwing rocks onto a highway. Bodycam video showed an officer repeatedly tell Wilson to "come here", and when the officer approached Wilson he walked away, holding a knife in his hand. The officer took out his gun and instructed Wilson three times to drop his knife, and when Wilson stepped toward the officer he was shot. Numerous rocks were found in Wilson's pocket. The officer involved had been involved in a separate shooting in 2018, for which he was charged with voluntary manslaughter in April 2021.
2021-03-11	William Anthony Morris II (50)	White	Texas (Galveston)	
2021-03-11	Christopher Lefande (49)	White	Florida (Cape Coral)	
2021-03-10	Martin Louis Douglas Jr. (30)	White	Indiana (Columbus)	
2021-03-10	Michael Laduca (42)	White	Louisiana (Coushatta)	
2021-03-10	Tyshon Jones (29)	Black	New York (Rochester)	
2021-03-10	Ivan Gutzalenko (47)	White	California (Richmond)	
2021-03-09	Jehlani Black (19)	Black	California (Riverside)	
2021-03-09	Jim Wright (67)	White	Kansas (Minneola)	
2021-03-09	David Robert Ruozi Jr. (30)	White	Oregon (Reedsport)	
2021-03-09	Joshua Montague (25)	White	Florida (Tampa)	
2021-03-08	David Kahler (30)	White	California (Burbank)	
2021-03-07	Howayne Gayle (35)	Black	Florida (Lakeland)	
2021-03-07	Joel R. Weldon (43)	White	Arkansas (Sparkman)	
2021-03-06	Jessie Peter (27)	White	Alaska (Fairbanks)	
2021-03-06	Anita Benz (45)	Unknown race	Kansas (Topeka)	
2021-03-05	Justin Lynn (44)	White	Texas (Midland)	
2021-03-05	Andrew Teague (43)	Black	Ohio (Columbus)	
2021-03-05	Gregory Williams (32)	Unknown race	Florida (Gainesville)	
2021-03-04	Judson Albahm (17)	White	New York (Jamesville)	Police shot and killed Albahm after he allegedly pointed an object at them. Police have not stated what the object Albahm was holding was.
2021-03-03	Dwight Brown (41)	Black	Louisiana (Abbeville)	Brown was shot and killed after firing a shotgun at police who arrived at his apartment.
2021-03-03	Broderick Woods (33)	Black	Texas (Houston)	
2021-03-03	Jonathan Levi Allen (28)	White	Indiana (Muncie)	
2021-03-01	Chandra Moore (55)	Black	Michigan (Detroit)	
2021-03-01	Adam Cunningham (46)	White	Alaska (Ozark)	

== See also ==
- Death in custody § United States
- Henry A. Wallace Police Crime Public Database
- List of cases of police brutality
- List of countries with annual rates and counts for killings by law enforcement officers
- List of law enforcement officers killed in the line of duty in the United States
- List of law enforcement officers convicted for an on-duty killing in the United States
- List of shootings by US immigration agents
- List of police reforms related to the George Floyd protests
- List of unarmed African Americans killed by law enforcement officers in the United States
- Lists of killings by law enforcement officers
- Police brutality in the United States
- Police misconduct § United States
- Police riot § United States
- Police use of deadly force in the United States
