= Mario González =

Mario González may refer to:

== Sports ==
- Mario González (cyclist) (born 1992), Spanish cyclist
- Mário Gonzalez (golfer) (1922–2019), Brazilian professional golfer
- Mario González (footballer, born 1950), Uruguayan footballer
- Mario González (footballer, born 1996), Spanish footballer
- Mario González (footballer, born 1997), Salvadoran footballer
- Mario González (judoka) (born 1971), Mexican judoka
- Mario González (Mexican boxer) (born 1969), Mexican Olympic boxer
- Mario González (swimmer) (born 1975), Cuban Olympic swimmer
- Mario González (Uruguayan boxer) (born 1901), Uruguayan Olympic boxer
- Mario González (wrestler) (born 1983), Mexican professional wrestler
- Mario Tovar González (1933–2011), Mexican wrestler

== Others ==
- Mario González, brother of Chihuahua state's Attorney General Patricia Gonzalez, connected with Operation Fast and Furious
- Mario Gonzalez (1994/1995 – 2021), man killed during police arrest in Alameda, California
- Mario Gonzales Benites (1937–2022), Peruvian footballer and manager naturalized Paraguayan
