= Manuel Mayorga =

Peruvian footballer (born 1943)

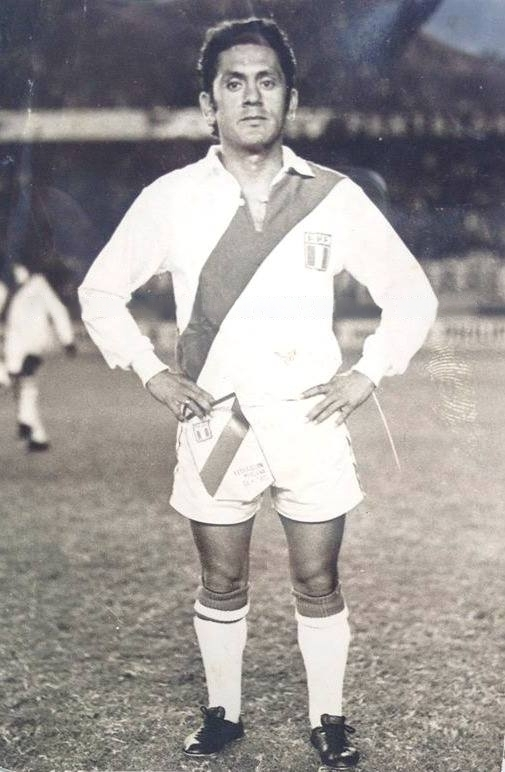
- Mayorga playing for Peru

Personal information
- Full name: Manuel Jesús Mayorga Paniccia
- Date of birth: 2 January 1943 (age 83)
- Place of birth: Callao, Peru
- Height: 1.78 m (5 ft 10 in)
- Position: Midfielder

Senior career*
Years	Team	Apps	(Gls)
1962	Atlético Barrio Frigorífico		
1964–1967	Sport Boys	91	(9)
1968	KDT Nacional	1	
1969–1970	Defensor Arica	27	(13)
1971–1975	Alianza Lima	118	(17)
1976	Carlos A. Mannucci	29	(3)

International career
1972–1973	Peru	15	(1)

Managerial career
- 1985: Peru U-20
- 1986: Peru
- 1989: Deportivo AELU
- 1990: Carlos A. Mannucci
- 1991–1992: Sport Boys
- 1994: Alcides Vigo
- * Club domestic league appearances and goals

Manuel Jesús Mayorga Paniccia (born 2 January 1943) is a Peruvian retired association football player and manager. Nicknamed El búfalo, he played as a midfielder and played in the Brazil Independence Cup.

== Club career ==
Playing as a midfielder since his youth, Mayorga's first major club accomplishment in the 1966 Torneo Descentralizado where his club, Sport Boys would reach second place and qualify for the 1967 Copa Libertadores. Around this period, he would meet with Brazilian World Cup player Zózimo with both playing in the same club until Mayorga was transferred to KDT Nacional for the 1968 season. He later played for Defensor Arica in the 1969 and 1970 seasons until he was transferred to Alianza Lima where he would be part of the winning squad of the 1975 Torneo Descentralizado.

In his first season within Alianza Lima, he would score 3 goals in 24 matches with the next year scoring 7 goals. The following year, he would score 2 goals and despite making less appearances for the 1974 season, Mayorga would score an extra-3 goals. During the 1974 and 1975 seasons, he would form an exceptional duo with Javier Castillo which made a significant contribution for the team to win the 1975 Torneo Descentralizado. His final season as a player would occur in 1976 as he would sign up and play for Carlos A. Mannucci before retiring in the same year.

== International career ==
During the 1972 season with Alianza Lima, the goals scored within would make him eligible to begin playing for Peru. His debut would be against Bolivia on 11 June 1972 during the Brazil Independence Cup. His last match would be on 27 July 1973 during the Copa Mariscal Ramón Castilla against Argentina.

== Managerial career ==
Mayorga would serve as an interim manager for Peru in April 1986 under retired footballer and president of the FPF, Oswaldo Ramírez. His only match would be a friendly match against Brazil at São Luís which would end in a 4–0 loss for Peru.

In 1989, he would assume management of Deportivo AELU for the upcoming 1989 Torneo Descentralizado. In 1991, Mayorga would replace Miguel Company as manager of Sport Boys where he would direct the team to reach runners-up of the 1991 Torneo Descentralizado and qualify for the 1991 Copa Libertadores. Other clubs he would manage include Carlos A. Mannucci in 1990 and Alcides Vigo in 1994.

== Career statistics ==
Club	Division	Season	League^{(1)}			National Cups^{(2)}			International Tournaments^{(3)}			Total			Median Goals^{(4)}
Club	Division	Season	Matches	Goals	Assists	Matches	Goals	Assists	Matches	Goals	Assists	Matches	Goals	Assists	Median Goals^{(4)}
Sport Boys; Peru
Sport Boys; Peru	Primera División	1964	21	1	-	-	-	-	-	-	-	21	1	-	0.0
Sport Boys; Peru	Primera División	1965	22	3	-	-	-	-	-	-	-	22	3	-	0.0
Sport Boys; Peru	Primera División	1966	22	2	-	-	-	-	-	-	-	22	2	-	0.33
Sport Boys; Peru	Primera División	1967	26	3	-	-	-	-	7	1	-	33	4	-	0.33
Sport Boys; Peru	Total Record		91	9	-	-	-	-	7	1	-	98	10	-	0.0
KDT; Peru
KDT; Peru	Primera División	1968	1	?	-	-	-	-	-	-	-	1	?	-	0.0
KDT; Peru	Total Record		1	?	-	-	-	-	-	-	-	1	?	-	0.0
Defensor Arica; Peru
Defensor Arica; Peru	Primera División														
Defensor Arica; Peru	Primera División	1969	?	4	-	-	-	-	-	-	-	?	4	-	0.0
Defensor Arica; Peru	Primera División	1970	27	6	-	2	0	-	6	0	-	35	6	-	0.33
Defensor Arica; Peru	Total Record		27	13	-	2	0	-	6	0	-	35	13	-	0.0
Alianza Lima; Peru
Alianza Lima; Peru	Primera División	1971	24	3	-	-	-	-	-	-	-	24	3	-	0.6
Alianza Lima; Peru	Primera División	1972	27	7	-	-	-	-	2	0	-	29	7	-	0.4
Alianza Lima; Peru	Primera División	1973	28	2	-	-	-	-	-	-	-	28	2	-	0.4
Alianza Lima; Peru	Primera División	1974	32	3	-	-	-	-	-	-	-	32	3	-	0.5
Alianza Lima; Peru	Primera División	1975	12	1	-	-	-	-	-	-	-	12	1	-	0.5
Alianza Lima; Peru	Total Record		118	17	-	-	-	-	2	0	-	120	17	-	0.44
Carlos A. Mannucci; Peru
Carlos A. Mannucci; Peru	Primera División	1976	29	3	-	-	-	-	-	-	-	29	3	-	0.1
Carlos A. Mannucci; Peru	Total Record		29	3	-	-	-	-	-	-	-	29	3	-	0.1
Total Career			265	42	-	2	0	-	15	1	-	282	43	-	0.45
^{(1)} Includes dates of definitive instances. ^{(2)} Includes dates of the Copa Presidente de la República (1970). ^{(3)} Includes dates of the Copa Libertadores de América (1967–1972). ^{(4)} Excludes goals from friendly matches

=== International goals ===
No	Date	Venue	Opponent	Score	Result	Competition
1.	26 February 1973	Estadio Nacional, Lima, Peru	Panama	4–0	4–0	Friendly
