= Carlos Flores (footballer, born 1974) =

Peruvian footballer (1974–2019)

Personal information
- Full name: Carlos Antonio Flores Murillo
- Date of birth: 4 August 1974
- Place of birth: Callao, Peru
- Date of death: 17 February 2019 (aged 44)
- Place of death: San Miguel, Lima, Peru
- Position: Midfielder

Senior career*
Years	Team	Apps	(Gls)
1991-1994	Sport Boys	53	(16)
1995	Universitario de Deportes	11	(3)
1996	Asociación Deportiva San Agustín	9	(0)
1996–1997	Al-Hilal	18	(6)
1998	Sport Boys	29	(4)
1998–1999	Aris	21	(2)
1999	Alianza Lima	10	(1)
2000	Sport Boys	11	(2)
2000	Clube Atlético Paranaense		
2001	Sport Boys	9	(0)
2001	Belgrano	1	(0)
2002	Juan Aurich	24	(7)
2002	Sport Boys	8	(2)
2003	Unión Huaral	7	(1)
2004	Sport Boys	6	(0)
2004	Deportivo Wanka	12	(5)
2005	Universitario de Deportes	11	(2)
2007	Sport Áncash	16	(2)
2008	Deportivo Pereira	3	(0)
2008	Sport Boys	18	(1)
2008-2009	Sport Áncash	17	(4)
2009	CNI	12	(1)
2010	Sport Boys	3	(0)
2012	Cobresol FBC	4	(0)

International career
1998–2000	Peru	2	(0)
- * Club domestic league appearances and goals

Carlos "Kukín" Flores Murillo (4 August 1974 – 17 February 2019) was a Peruvian footballer who played as a midfielder.

== Early childhood ==
Carlos Flores was born in Los Barracones in Callao, Peru, and during his childhood he lived in Chucuito, Castilla, La Perla, Ciudad del Pescador, Atahualpa and the human settlement Canada. He was the youngest of 11 brothers and since he was five years old he had the need to clean cars to be able to watch for himself. About this, Flores commented that he is proud about the work he did with cars as a kid. He thought about it as an honorable job. He even told a story about how he looked after Julio Cesar Uribe’s car some time before Spain’s World Cup in 1982. He also said that he got a tip (he did not remember how much), but said that the best tip he got was that Julio Cesar Uribe was crucial in Peru’s qualification for the world cup.

On a Peruvian TV show called "El Valor de la Verdad" (The Value of Truth in English), Flores told Beto Ortiz, the host of the show, that he and his ten brothers were abandoned by their parents when he was very young. It was his oldest sister, Rosario, who took care of the family. According to "Kukin", she played the part of both a father and a mother for him and the rest of his brothers. He also mentioned that she was living in Chile at the time the show was broadcast (2004).

Furthermore, he said that one day police officers arrived at the house where he used to live with his brothers to inform them that their parents had sold the house and that they had twenty-four hours to evacuate the place. It was true, they had documents signed by both his parents that proved it. When asked if he knows why his parents did the things they did, he replied no. His father died in the early 1990s. About his mother, he said she was still alive during the time of this interview and that he loved her very much. “I don’t want to judge her”, he said.

== Youth Soccer ==
Despite not having a long Youth Soccer career, given that he made his professional soccer debut with Sport Boys Association aged 16, it was transcendental for his development as both a person and soccer player. According to a chronicle written by María del Carmen Irigoyen and published by El Comercio, one of Peru's most important newspapers, Academia Deportiva Cantolao was kind of a second family for Flores.

Cesar Gonzales, who trained Flores both in Academia Deportiva Cantolao and Sport Boys Association, told the author that the other kid's parents used to take care of him, for example, giving him money for him to be able to fly for the team's international tours. Academia Deportiva Cantolao also matriculated Flores to the Liceo Naval Almirante Guise, a School located in the San Borja district in Lima. However, as Gonzales explained he didn't last long, Flores didn't like rules nor systems. The same thing happened with soccer and tactics. "You just gave him a jersey and he would do whatever he wanted. [...]. It was all his ideas, his magic", Gonzales said.

== Club career ==
Flores has played for a number of clubs in Peru, including Alianza Lima, Universitario de Deportes and Sport Boys. He had also had a spell with Aris in the Super League Greece during the 1998-99 season. However, the club where he spent the most time was Sport boys.

== International career ==
Flores appeared twice for the senior Peru national football team, making his debut in a friendly against the Netherlands on 10 October 1998. His last match was a qualifier for the 2002 FIFA World Cup. This game was Against the Colombia National Football Team in the year 2000. Peru's National Football Team lost the game 1-0 (goalscorer: Juan Pablo Angel), and Flores played the last thirty minutes of the game. According to El Comercio, Flores' performance was good enough for Francisco Maturana, who was Peru's trainer at the time, to put his as a starter in the next game against Uruguay. However, the next training session Flores claimed he injured himself during an exercise. After the team's doctor made some tests, it was clear that Flores's injury was not a soccer injury. It is reported by El Comercio that after investigating the incident it was discovered that Flores had been involved in a street fight and was never summoned for Peru's National Team again.

== Scandals ==
Flores’ career was marked by a high number of scandals off the pitch. Besides the one previously mentioned, where he got injured during a street fight after the 2002 World Cup Qualifiers match against Colombia, there are some incidents that Peruvians may remember. During 2004 he was found lying on the street half-naked. A video went viral where a woman could be seen trying to help him. During this scandal Flores was smiling and not responsive. He then said that while he was home he saw a woman's ghost and run to the streets to ask for help. Another scandal Kukin starred was when he felt down 4 stories from his apartment window. According to witnesses, he tried to enter through the window after he forgot his keys.

Flores was also known for the use of recreational drugs, more precisely cocaine. During the previously mentioned interview in Beto Ortiz's TV show ‘El Valor de la Verdad’, he revealed that he used cocaine while being a soccer player. When asked about how he hid his drug using (professional soccer players are randomly tested for drug use after games), he said that he had a way to beat the test. However, he said he was not going to reveal his trick in order not to foment the use of drugs in kids and athletes.

== Trivia ==
On 8 January 2009 it was reported that Flores claimed he was being chased by ghosts. He eventually admitted that he had been "engaging with dirty ladies" and that he manufactured the ghost story to try to hide the truth from his wife.
