= Juan Carlos Cabanillas =

Peruvian footballer (born 1963)

Personal information
- Full name: Juan Carlos Cabanillas Mendoza
- Date of birth: 2 May 1963 (age 63)
- Place of birth: Callao, Peru
- Position: Midfielder

Youth career
- Sport Boys

Senior career*
Years	Team	Apps	(Gls)
1981–1985	Sport Boys		
1986	Universitario		
1986–1987	Santa Fe		
1988	Montevideo Wanderers		
1990–1991	Unión Huaral		
1992	UTC		
1992–1993	Canton Invaders (indoor)	3	(0)
1993	Deportivo Municipal		
1994–1995	Sport Boys		
1996	Guardia Republicana		
1997	Indiana Twisters (indoor)	24	(10)
1998–1999	Baltimore Blast (indoor)	3	(0)

International career
1984–1988	Peru	6	(0)

Managerial career
- 2000–2001: Peru U17 (assistant)
- 2004: Atlético Grau
- 2005: Sport Boys
- 2006: UTC
- 2007: La Peña Sporting
- 2009: Sport Boys
- 2013: Walter Ormeño
- 2015–2016: Carlos A. Mannucci
- 2017–2018: Carlos Stein
- 2020–2021: Cantolao (assistant)
- 2024: Deportivo Coopsol (assistant)
- 2025: Deportivo Coopsol (assistant)
- 2025: Sport Boys
- * Club domestic league appearances and goals

Juan Carlos Cabanillas Mendoza (born 2 May 1963) is a Peruvian football manager and former player who played as a midfielder.

== Club career ==
After making his first team debut with Sport Boys in 1981, Cabanillas helped the side to win the 1984 Torneo Descentralizado before playing a friendly tournament with Peñarol in late 1985. In the following year, he joined Universitario, but moved to Santa Fe shortly after.

In 1988, Cabanillas switched teams and countries again, after signing for Montevideo Wanderers in Uruguay. He returned to his home country in 1990 with Unión Huaral, and had one-year spells at UTC and Deportivo Municipal (aside from a short period playing indoor soccer at Canton Invaders) before returning to Sport Boys in 1994.

Cabanillas played for Guardia Republicana in 1996, and subsequently returned to the United States in the following year, back to indoor soccer at Indiana Twisters. He then spent the 1998–99 season at Baltimore Blast, and subsequently retired.

== International career ==
Cabanillas made his full international debut with the Peru national team on 19 September 1984, in a 2–0 loss to Uruguay. He featured in a further five matches for the national side until 1988.

== Managerial career ==
After retiring, Cabanillas began his managerial career as an assistant of César González at the Peru national under-17 team in the 2001 Bolivarian Games. In 2004, he became the manager of Atlético Grau, and returned to his first club Sport Boys in the following year, now as manager.

Cabanillas subsequently managed UTC and La Peña Sporting before being named at the helm of the Boys ahead of the 2009 campaign. He lasted 14 matches before being sacked from the latter. In March 2013, he took over Walter Ormeño.

On 13 September 2015, Cabanillas was announced as manager of Carlos A. Mannucci. On 4 October of the following year, despite being in the first position of the Segunda División, he left by mutual consent.

In 2017, Cabanillas took over Carlos Stein, but left the club in July of the following year. In October 2020, he joined Jorge Espejo's staff at Cantolao, as his assistant. He remained in the role in two stints at Deportivo Coopsol, both under Willy Laya.

On 26 August 2025, Cabanillas returned to Sport Boys after being appointed manager of the club. On 15 December, he left as his contract was due to expire.
