= Peru national under-20 football team =

National association football team

Peru
- Nickname(s): La Bicolor (The Bicolour); La Blanquirroja (The White and Red); La Rojiblanca (The Red and White)
- Association: Peruvian Football Federation
- Confederation: CONMEBOL (South America)
- Head coach: Thiago Kosloski
- Captain: Anderson Villacorta
- Home stadium: Estadio Nacional
- FIFA code: PER
| First colours | Second colours |

First international
- Peru 2–2 Paraguay (Caracas, Venezuela; May 23, 1954)

Biggest win
- Peru 8–0 Venezuela (Bolivia; January 28, 1983)

Biggest defeat
- Brazil 9–0 Peru (Belém, Brazil; November 16, 2026)

South American Youth Championship
- Appearances: 30 (first in 1954)
- Best result: 4th Place (1954, 1958, 1967, 1971, 1975)
Medal record
Bolivarian Games
| Bronze medal – third place | 1985 Cuenca | NA |
Men's South American Games
| Gold medal – first place | 1990 Lima | NA |
| Bronze medal – third place | 1982 Rosario | NA |
| Bronze medal – third place | 2026 Rosario | NA |

Peru national under-20 football team represents Peru in international competitions and is under the supervision of the Peruvian Football Federation. The Peruvians have finished in fourth place at the South American Youth Championship on five occasions, but they have never managed to qualify for the World Cup.

Teams managed by Juan Carlos Oblitas in 1999, by Daniel Ahmed in 2013, and by Víctor Rivera in 2015 have been the most successful teams until 2015. The three of them reached the 5th place. In other appearances, Peru was almost always eliminated in Group Stage.

== History ==
The Peru National Under-20 football team was founded in the 1950s and made their debut at the 1954 South American U-20 Championship. Peru placed Fourth in the tournament and again in 1958. The youth team's most successful period was in the 1950s to 70s, placing fourth in five of the seven South American Youth Championships. Some of the Peruvian players of these tournaments went on to play for the senior team, which qualified and performed well at the 1970 FIFA World Cup and won the 1975 Copa América. Despite the team's good performance, they failed to qualify for the inaugural 1977 FIFA World Youth Championship. Despite this setback, the Peruvians managed to beat Maradona's Argentina 2–1 on the occasion of the 1977 South American U-20 Championship. To date, this is Peru's only victory over Argentina in the tournament.

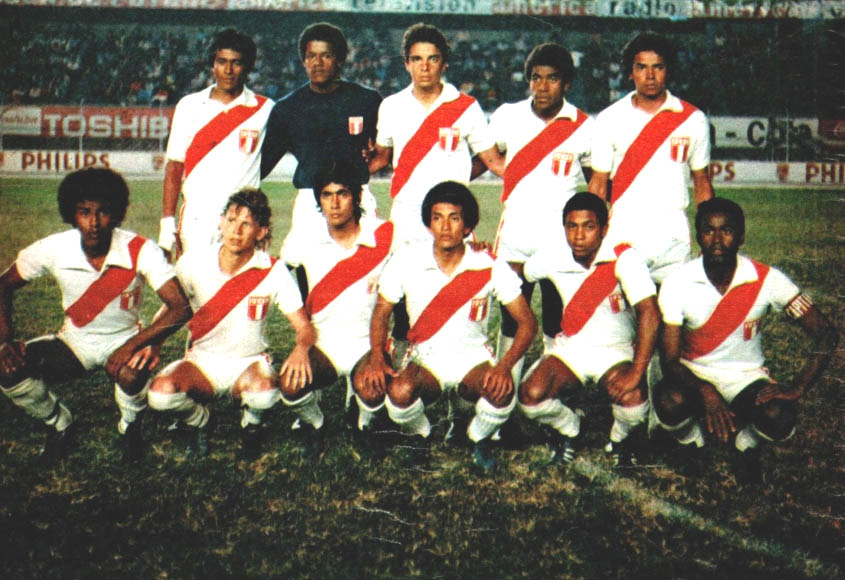
Peru U20 team of 1979

In 1981, Peru declined participation for that years Youth Championship and did not enter to the World Cup.

Much like the senior team, the youth team faced a decline in performance, not advancing past the First Round in any Youth Championship from 1983 to 2011. It wasn't until 2013 where Peru reached the Final Round of the 2013 South American Youth Football Championship, for the first time since 1975, notably by eliminating Brazil 2–0.

Peru placed fifth in the tournament and reached the final round again in 2015 and 2019. Around the same time, the senior team qualified for the 2018 FIFA World Cup for the first time in 36 years and reaching the 2019 Copa América final. Players such as Claudio Pizarro and Jefferson Farfán would go on to the senior team, helping Peru achieve these feats. Peru was set to host the 2025 South American U-20 Championship in Arequipa, but CONMEBOL stripped the country of hosting rights due to instability within the Peruvian Football Federation.

On November 16, 2026, during a friendly match against Brazil in Belém, Peru U20 was thrashed 9–0—the worst defeat in its history.

== Competitive record ==
=== FIFA U-20 World Cup ===
| Year | Round | GP | W | D* | L | GS | GA |
|---|---|---|---|---|---|---|---|
| (Tunisia) 1977 | Did not qualify | | | | | | |
| (Japan) 1979 | Did not qualify | | | | | | |
| (Australia) 1981 | Did not enter | | | | | | |
| (Mexico) 1983 | Did not qualify | | | | | | |
| (Soviet Union) 1985 | Did not qualify | | | | | | |
| (Chile) 1987 | Did not qualify | | | | | | |
| (Saudi Arabia) 1989 | Did not qualify | | | | | | |
| (Portugal) 1991 | Did not qualify | | | | | | |
| (Australia) 1993 | Did not qualify | | | | | | |
| (Qatar) 1995 | Did not qualify | | | | | | |
| (Malaysia) 1997 | Did not qualify | | | | | | |
| (Nigeria) 1999 | Did not qualify | | | | | | |
| (Argentina) 2001 | Did not qualify | | | | | | |
| (United Arab Emirates) 2003 | Did not qualify | | | | | | |
| (Netherlands) 2005 | Did not qualify | | | | | | |
| (Canada) 2007 | Did not qualify | | | | | | |
| (Egypt) 2009 | Did not qualify | | | | | | |
| (Colombia) 2011 | Did not qualify | | | | | | |
| (Turkey) 2013 | Did not qualify | | | | | | |
| (New Zealand) 2015 | Did not qualify | | | | | | |
| (South Korea) 2017 | Did not qualify | | | | | | |
| (Poland) 2019 | Did not qualify | | | | | | |
| (Argentina) 2023 | Did not qualify | | | | | | |
| (Chile) 2025 | Did not qualify | | | | | | |
| (Azerbaijan) (Uzbekistan) 2027 | To be determined | | | | | | |
| (Armenia) (Georgia (country)) 2029 | To be determined | | | | | | |
| (India) 2031 | To be determined | | | | | | |
| Total | – | – | – | – | – | – | – |

=== South American Youth Championship ===
South American Youth Championship record
| Years | Round | Gp | W | D* | L | GS | GA |
|---|---|---|---|---|---|---|---|
| (Venezuela) 1954 | Fourth place | 7 | 2 | 3 | 2 | 10 | 11 |
| (Chile) 1958 | Fourth place | 5 | 2 | 2 | 1 | 13 | 13 |
| (Colombia) 1964 | First round | 6 | 2 | 1 | 3 | 7 | 9 |
| (Paraguay) 1967 | Fourth place | 5 | 2 | 1 | 2 | 9 | 7 |
| (Paraguay) 1971 | Fourth place | 5 | 2 | 1 | 2 | 7 | 7 |
| (Chile) 1974 | First round | 3 | 1 | 1 | 1 | 2 | 2 |
| (Peru) 1975 | Fourth place | 5 | 1 | 2 | 2 | 4 | 8 |
| (Venezuela) 1977 | First round | 4 | 1 | 1 | 2 | 7 | 9 |
| (Uruguay) 1979 | First round | 4 | 1 | 0 | 3 | 3 | 10 |
| (Ecuador) 1981 | Did not participate | | | | | | |
| (Bolivia) 1983 | First round | 4 | 1 | 0 | 3 | 11 | 9 |
| (Paraguay) 1985 | First round | 4 | 0 | 2 | 2 | 2 | 7 |
| (Colombia) 1987 | First round | 3 | 0 | 0 | 3 | 4 | 10 |
| (Argentina) 1988 | First round | 5 | 2 | 1 | 2 | 5 | 7 |
| (Venezuela) 1991 | First round | 4 | 1 | 2 | 1 | 4 | 8 |
| (Colombia) 1992 | First round | 3 | 0 | 0 | 3 | 2 | 8 |
| (Bolivia) 1995 | First round | 4 | 1 | 0 | 3 | 4 | 7 |
| (Chile) 1997 | First round | 4 | 0 | 2 | 2 | 3 | 7 |
| (Argentina) 1999 | Final round | 9 | 3 | 2 | 4 | 8 | 22 |
| (Ecuador) 2001 | First round | 4 | 1 | 1 | 2 | 4 | 5 |
| (Uruguay) 2003 | First round | 4 | 0 | 0 | 4 | 3 | 13 |
| (Colombia) 2005 | First round | 4 | 0 | 1 | 3 | 1 | 11 |
| (Paraguay) 2007 | First round | 4 | 0 | 0 | 4 | 4 | 11 |
| (Venezuela) 2009 | First round | 4 | 0 | 0 | 4 | 3 | 8 |
| (Peru) 2011 | First round | 4 | 1 | 1 | 2 | 4 | 5 |
| (Argentina) 2013 | Final round | 9 | 3 | 3 | 3 | 13 | 13 |
| (Uruguay) 2015 | Final round | 9 | 3 | 1 | 5 | 11 | 21 |
| (Ecuador) 2017 | First round | 4 | 0 | 2 | 2 | 2 | 6 |
| (Chile) 2019 | First round | 4 | 1 | 0 | 3 | 2 | 5 |
| (Venezuela) ~~2021~~ | Cancelled due to the COVID-19 pandemic | | | | | | |
| (Colombia) 2023 | First round | 4 | 0 | 0 | 4 | 1 | 7 |
| (Venezuela) 2025 | First round | 4 | 0 | 0 | 4 | 3 | 11 |
| (Colombia) 2027 | To be determined | | | | | | |
| Total | Fourth place | 142 | 30 | 30 | 82 | 157 | 279 |

=== Bolivarian Games ===
Bolivarian Games record
| Year | Result | Pld | W | D | L | GF | GA |
|---|---|---|---|---|---|---|---|
| (Colombia) 1938 | See A team | | | | | | |
| From 1947 to 1981 | Disputed by amateur teams | | | | | | |
| (Ecuador) 1985 | Bronze medal | 4 | 0 | 0 | 4 | 0 | 9 |
| (Venezuela) 1989 | No tournament held | | | | | | |
| Since 1993 | See U-17 team | | | | | | |
| Total | Bronze medal | 4 | 0 | 0 | 4 | 0 | 9 |

=== South American Games ===
South American Games record
| Year | Result | Pld | W | D | L | GF | GA |
|---|---|---|---|---|---|---|---|
| (Bolivia) 1978 | Did not enter | | | | | | |
| (Argentina) 1982 | Bronze medal | 3 | 0 | 1 | 2 | 2 | 4 |
| (Chile) 1986 | Group stage | 3 | 1 | 0 | 2 | 4 | 6 |
| (Peru) 1990 | Gold medal | 2 | 1 | 1 | 0 | 2 | 1 |
| (Venezuela) 1994 | See U-17 team | | | | | | |
| From 1998 to 2006 | Futsal tournament | | | | | | |
| From 2010 to 2014 | See U-17 team | | | | | | |
| (Bolivia) 2018 | Did not enter | | | | | | |
| (Paraguay) 2022 | Group stage | 3 | 0 | 2 | 1 | 2 | 8 |
| (Argentina) 2026 | Bronze medal | 5 | 3 | 0 | 2 | 6 | 5 |
| Total | Gold medal | 16 | 5 | 4 | 7 | 16 | 24 |

== Current squad ==
The following players were called up for the 2025 South American U-20 Championship.

| No. | Pos. | Player | Date of birth (age) | Caps | Goals | Club |
|---|---|---|---|---|---|---|
| | GK | William Falcón | 27 April 2005 (age 21) | | | (Peruvian Football Federation) UCV |
| | GK | Paolo Doneda | 18 May 2007 (age 19) | | | (Italian Football Federation) AC Milan |
| | GK | Jhefferson Rodriguez | 13 March 2006 (age 20) | | | (Peruvian Football Federation) Universitario |
| | DF | Alejandro Pósito | 5 August 2005 (age 21) | | | (Peruvian Football Federation) Sporting Cristal |
| | DF | Nicolás Amasifuén | 5 July 2005 (age 21) | | | (Peruvian Football Federation) Alianza Lima |
| | DF | Anderson Villacorta (captain) | 25 July 2005 (age 21) | | | (Mexican Football Federation) Mineros de Zacatecas |
| | DF | Julinho Astudillo | 7 January 2005 (age 21) | | | (Peruvian Football Federation) Universitario |
| | DF | Brian Arias | 2 September 2006 (age 20) | | | (Peruvian Football Federation) Alianza Lima |
| | DF | Jussepi García | 6 July 2007 (age 19) | | | (Peruvian Football Federation) Alianza Lima |
| | DF | Fabrizio Lora | 30 August 2005 (age 21) | | | (Peruvian Football Federation) Sporting Cristal |
| | DF | Mateo Arakaki | 1 July 2008 (age 18) | | | (Peruvian Football Federation) Alianza Lima |
| | DF | Axel Cabellos | 18 November 2006 (age 20) | | | (Argentine Football Association) Racing Club |
| | MF | Sebastián Cornejo | 8 May 2006 (age 20) | | | (Peruvian Football Federation) USMP |
| | MF | Ian Wisdom | 14 September 2005 (age 21) | | | (Peruvian Football Federation) Sporting Cristal |
| | MF | Esteban Cruz | 12 February 2006 (age 20) | | | (Peruvian Football Federation) Universitario |
| | MF | Álvaro Rojas | 12 March 2005 (age 21) | | | (Peruvian Football Federation) Universitario |
| | MF | Homali Ruiz | 12 March 2006 (age 20) | | | (Peruvian Football Federation) USMP |
| | MF | Sebastián Sánchez | 7 December 2005 (age 20) | | | (Peruvian Football Federation) Sporting Cristal |
| | FW | Víctor Guzmán | 25 March 2006 (age 20) | | | (Peruvian Football Federation) Alianza Lima |
| | FW | Juan Pablo Goicochea | 12 January 2005 (age 21) | | | (Argentine Football Association) Platense |
| | FW | Bassco Soyer | 17 October 2006 (age 20) | | | (Peruvian Football Federation) Alianza Lima |
| | FW | Rodrigo Dioses | 20 February 2005 (age 21) | | | (Peruvian Football Federation) Universitario |
| | FW | Maxloren Castro | 8 December 2007 (age 18) | | | (Peruvian Football Federation) Sporting Cristal |

== Coaching history ==
Source consulted: RSSSF

- (Peru) Raúl Chappell (1954)
- (Hungary) György Orth (1958)
- (Brazil) Marinho Rodrigues (1964)
- (Brazil) José Gomes Nogueira (1967)
- (Peru) Alejandro Heredia (1971)
- (Peru) Mario Gonzales (1974)
- (Peru) Luis Zacarías (1975)
- (Peru) Marcos Calderón (1977)
- (Peru) José Chiarella (1979)
- (Peru) Luis Roth (1983–1985)
- (Peru) Juan Carlos Oblitas (1987)
- (Peru) Percy Rojas (1988)
- (Peru) César Gonzales (1990–1991)
- (Peru) Titín Drago (1992)
- (Socialist Federal Republic of Yugoslavia) Dragan Miranović (1995)
- (Peru) Rafael Castillo (1997)
- (Peru) Juan Carlos Oblitas (1999)
- (Peru) Julio César Uribe (2001)
- (Peru) César Gonzales (2003)
- (Peru) Julio García Ruiz (2003)
- (Argentina) José Luis Pavoni (2007)
- (Peru) Tito Chumpitaz (2008–2009)
- (Uruguay) Gustavo Ferrín (2010–2011)
- (Argentina) Daniel Ahmed (2012–2013)
- (Peru) Víctor Rivera (2014–2015)
- (Argentina) Daniel Ahmed (2016–2019)
- (Peru) Carlos Silvestri (2020–2021)
- (Peru) Víctor Reyes (2021)
- (Uruguay) Gustavo Roverano (2022)
- (Peru) Jaime Serna (2022–2023)
- (Peru) José del Solar (2024–2025)
- (Brazil) Thiago Kosloski (2026–)

== Famous previous players ==
- Wilmer Aguirre
- Piero Alva
- Sandro Baylón
- Marko Ciurlizza
- Erick Delgado
- Jefferson Farfán
- Jean Ferrari
- George Forsyth
- Luis Guadalupe
- Martín Hidalgo
- Damián Ísmodes
- Abel Lobatón
- Flavio Maestri
- Paolo Maldonado
- Manuel Marengo
- Andrés Mendoza
- Claudio Pizarro
- Ámilton Prado
- Alberto Rodríguez
- Junior Ross
- Guillermo Salas
- Nolberto Solano
- Juan Vargas
- Walter Vílchez
- Junior Viza
- Carlos Zambrano
- Reimond Manco

== Honours ==
- South American Games
  - (gold) Gold Medalists (1): 1990
  - (bronze) Bronze Medalists (2): 1982, 2026
- Bolivarian Games
  - (bronze) Bronze Medalists (1): 1985
