= Sport Boys =

Association football club in Peru

Sport Boys Association
- Nicknames: Boys; Los Rosados; Los Porteños; La Misilera; Los Olímpicos de Berlín; La Academia Porteña; La Nube Rosada
- Founded: 1927
- Stadium: Estadio Miguel Grau
- Chairman: Johan Vásquez
- Manager: Carlos Desio
- League: Liga 1
- 2025: Liga 1, 14th of 19
- Website: www.sportboys.com.pe
Home colours	Away colours	Third colours

The Sport Boys Association, commonly referred to as the Sport Boys or simply the Boys, is a Peruvian association football club based in Callao, Peru. The club currently participates in the Peruvian Primera División, the top tier of Peruvian football, and are based in Estadio Miguel Grau alongside two other clubs in Callao, Academia Cantolao and Universidad de San Martín de Porres. Their biggest rivalry is with Atlético Chalaco, known among fans as the Clásico Porteño.

Founded on 28 July 1927, the Sport Boys are historically considered the fourth most prominent club of Peruvian football with 6 national titles and the most continental appearances after the capital Lima's big three clubs, Alianza Lima, Cristal y la u de Lima Their most recent title was in 1984, where they beat Colegio Nacional Iquitos to qualify for the 1985 Copa Libertadores. This was the first title in the professional era of Peru's top flight.

The Boys' original uniform had red and yellow stripes before they switched to the current pink and black color scheme. They are also the first football club in Peru to feature cheerleading.

== History ==
=== Foundation ===
The Sport Boys was founded on 28 July 1927 by a group of young football fans in Callao, who wanted to help one Gualberto Lizárraga start his own club. The day before Independence Day in Peru, 27 July, the group held a meeting, sang the national anthem and at midnight proclaimed the club's foundation, with Lizárraga as president.

=== Golden age ===
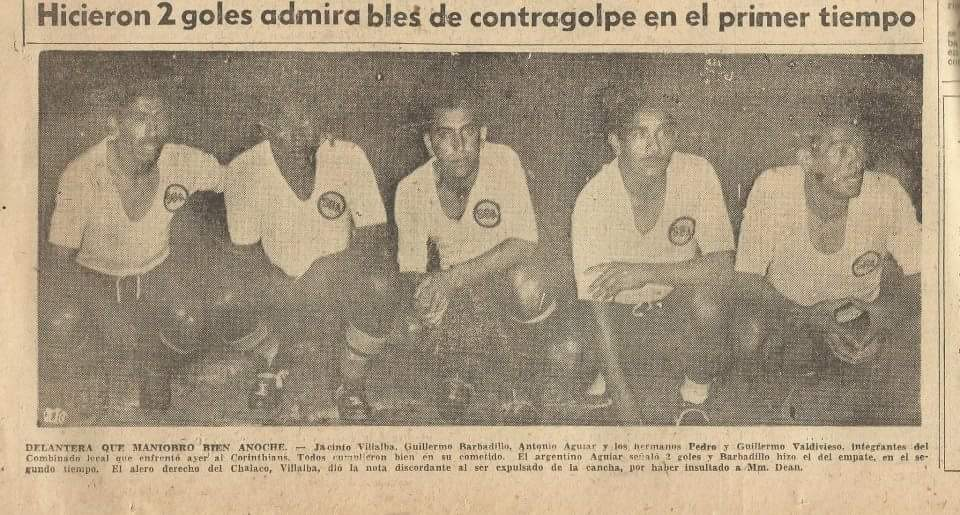
The Sport Boys in 1950

The Sport Boys participated in the Provincial League of Lima and Callao from 1929 to 1932 (finishing third in 1930 and runners-up in both 1931 and the 1932 Intermediate Division), managing to ascend to the first category of national football, called the Honor Division at that time. A few years after being promoted to the Peruvian Primera División, they won their first national title, winning the 1935 Peruvian Primera División undefeated, eight points ahead of their closest competitor. Two years later, the club won the First Division again in 1937 and the year after became runners-up after losing to Universitario. They went trophyless until 1942 with yet another league title.

In 1951, after having finished second the year before, the Sport Boys won their first national league title in the professional era and their fourth overall. In 1958, Marcos Calderón became their as head coach. He would bring the Boys to win their fifth title in 1958 and eventually led the Peruvian national team to win the 1975 Copa América.

After finishing second place in the 1966 Torneo Descentralizado, the Sport Boys qualified for the newly-created Copa Libertadores in 1967 but were eliminated in the first round. The club won their most recent title in 1984. Before 1984, they came second in the First Division five times, in 1952, 1959, 1960, 1966 and 1976. After winning the 1985 Torneo Descentralizado, the Boys qualified for the Copa Libertadores once again in 1985 and reached the quarter-finals, a feat they previously achieved in 1977 after becoming runners-up of the 1976 Torneo Descentralizado.

=== Downfall ===
The Sport Boys was going through an economic crisis and a long drought of titles. The club was relegated to the Peruvian Segunda División in 1987 and stayed for two years, until they won the 1989 tournament and got promoted back to the First Division. They won the Torneo Regional in 1990 and qualified for the 1991 Copa Libertadores. The Sport Boys qualified for the next edition as well. They were eliminated in the first round in both editions.

=== Recent years ===
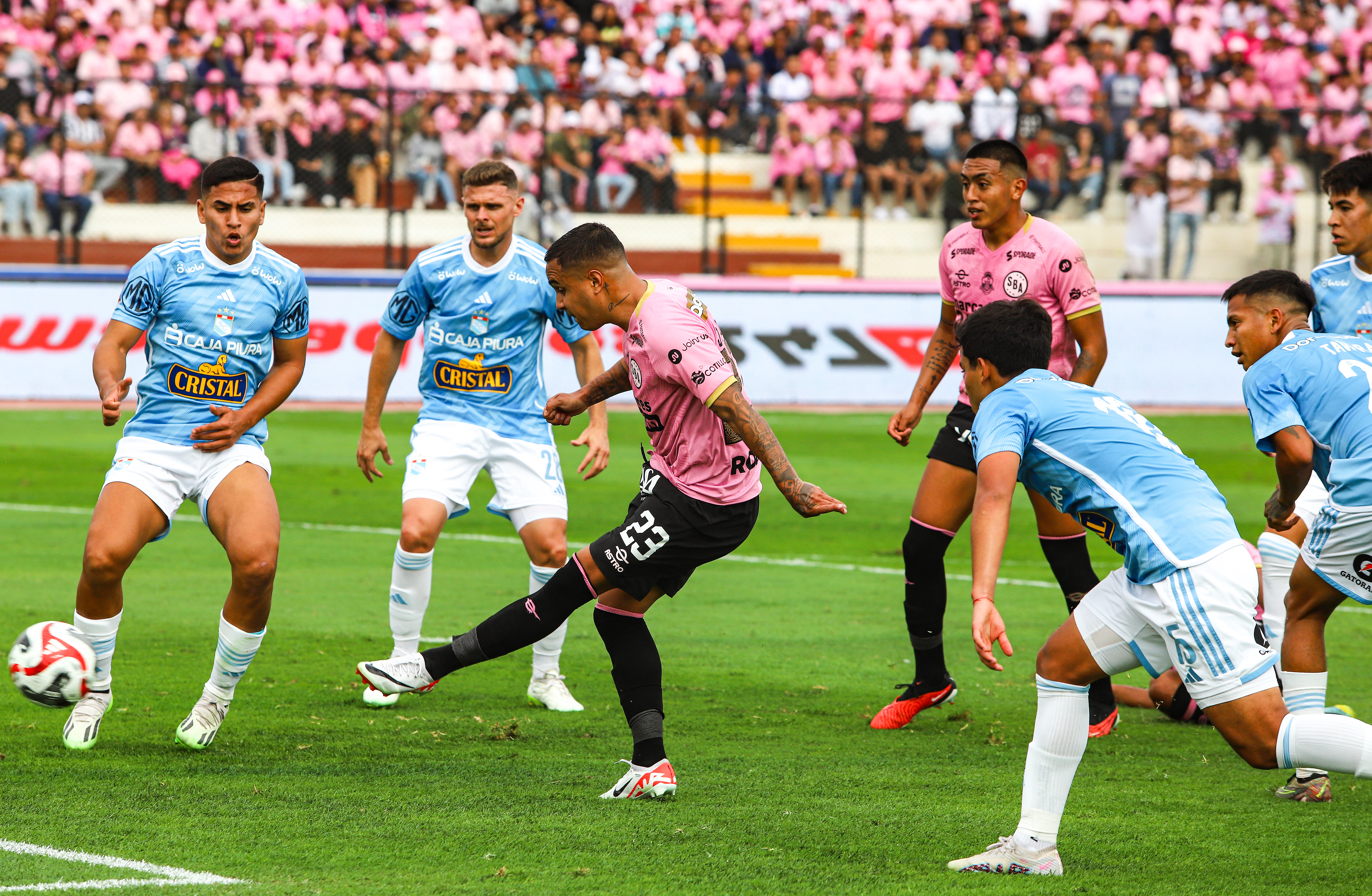
Sport Boys against Sporting Cristal in 2023

The last time the Boys became champions of the Primera División Peruana was 1984. Since then they have had a rollercoaster of ups and downs. Some of the ups have been being runners-up in the 1990 and 1991 First Division after having won the Segunda División Peruana to gain promotion. In 1999, the Boys qualified for the Copa CONMEBOL, and in 2001 for the 2001 Copa Libertadores. Since then that team has had more downs than ups by avoiding relegation to the Segunda División Peruana by winning an end of season playoff match that went down to a penalty shootout against José Gálvez in the 2006 season. During 2008 their campaign was worse than the 2007 campaign leaving the Sport Boys in the bottom of the standings for most of the Apertura tournament. Financial issues were also haunting the club in 2008, so severe that they have not been able to pay their players from March 2008. Some players like midfielder Montenegro have had to do taxi work at night to be able to support their families. That year they were relegated to the Segunda División Peruana but were promoted the following year where it played for three seasons before been inundated with economical problems, and then finishing 15th during the 2012 season which relegated them back to the Peruvian Segunda Division.

The Boys returned to the Peruvian Primera División after winning the 2017 Peruvian Segunda División. They placed 14th on the aggregate table on the brink of Relegation but were ahead of the relegation zone by 11 points and again in 2019. The club qualified for the 2022 Copa Sudamericana, their first participation in the tournament. They did not advance past the First Round.

== Kit and crest ==
The pink shirt is perhaps the most characteristic symbol of the Sport Boys of Callao. After the club was founded, back in 1927, it was decided that the Boys' shirt would have red and yellow vertical stripes. However, in 1929, after the first championship in which the club participated – a children's tournament organized by the Raimondi Intellectual Club of La Victoria – it was decided to change the color of the uniform, adopting the pink jacket. And it has never been changed since then. However, the model of the shirt changed over the years, but not the colors that represent the club. The year 1981 was characterized by the club wearing a completely pink outfit, a uniform that was also used in some games in 1973, 1986, 2009 and 2010.

Due to the peculiarity of the shirt color, the club has rarely used an alternate jersey. In 1989 against Juventud Progreso, who also wore pink, they used an alternative yellow shirt for the first time. Then in 2004 they wore a black uniform in some games as a protest for having been stripped of the third place in the Copa Libertadores. They also wore black in 2010. In 2008 and 2014 they wanted to remember the club's original colors and adopted, as an alternative shirt, one with yellow and red vertical stripes that was used for the only time on matchday 16 of the Second Division. 2014 in Huacho against the Pacific, because both clubs have the starting uniform of the same color.

Current logo

== Stadium ==
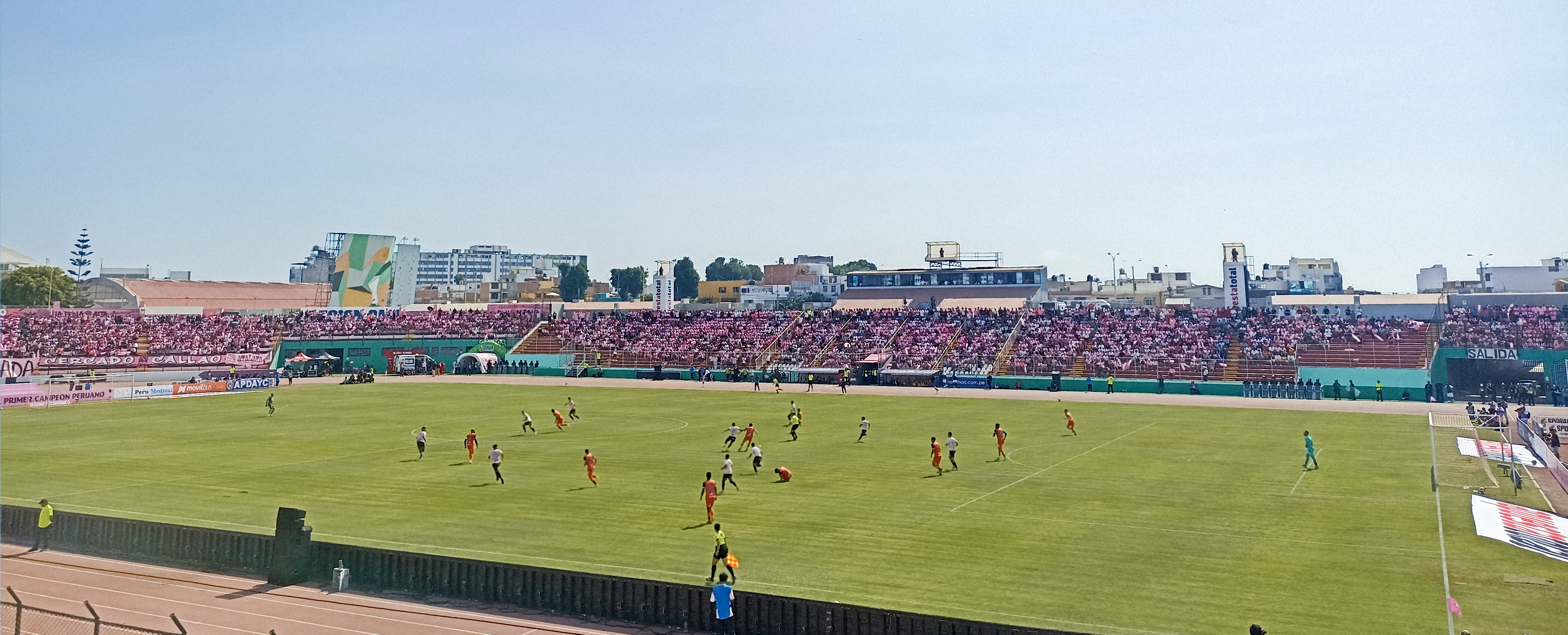
Estadio Miguel Grau.

The Sport Boys plays its home games at the Estadio Miguel Grau. It has a capacity of 17,000 seats. The stadium is named after the Peruvian war hero of the War of the Pacific, Miguel Grau Seminario. The stadium shares the same name as another, larger stadium in Piura, the birthplace of Miguel Grau Seminario. The Boys shares it stadium with the Academia Cantolao, Deportivo Municipal, and the Club Universidad de San Martín de Porres.

Before this stadium was built, they had to use the 5,000-spectator capacity, Estadio Telmo Carbajo, a stadium that was in bad condition and unfit to host football matches. It was the first stadium constructed in Callao. The Sport Boys were forced to play their games in the Estadio Nacional, where they would be far away from their fans.

== Supporters ==
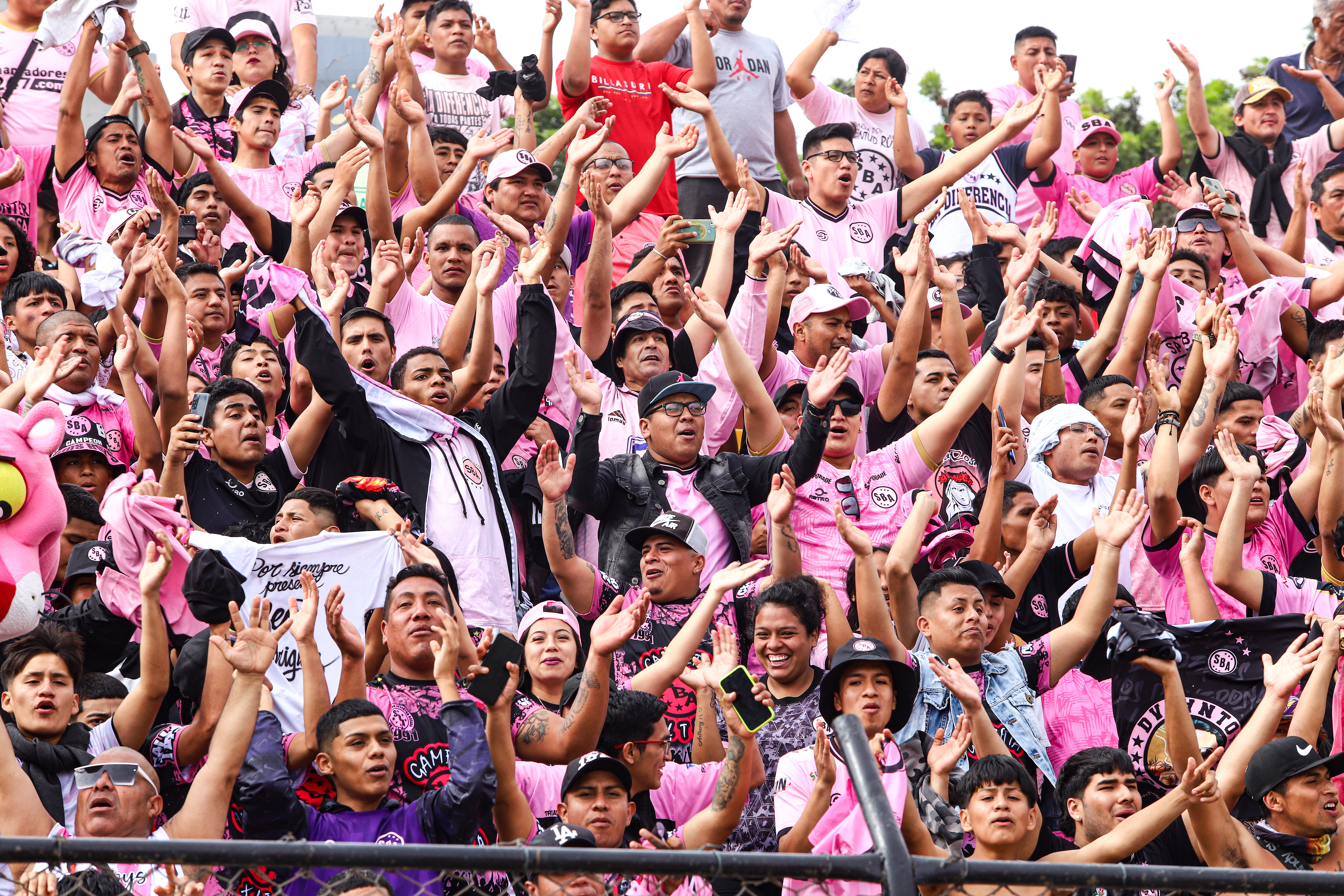
Sport Boys fans at Estadio Miguel Grau.

The pink team's ''barras'' had their formal beginning in 1966 when, at the initiative of Isaac Lastres after a championship match, a group of fans decided to group together forming the "Vamos Boys" barra. This barra was traditionally located in the west stand of stadiums. Some time later a group of fans separated from it, creating the team's second bar called "Somos Boys", which was located in the east stand.

The third barra of the pink team is called "Juventud Rosada", formed by the new generation of the Sport Boys fans. It was founded on 20 August 1991 at the initiative of a group of twenty boys, gathered in the Isabel la Católica park, near the municipality of Bellavista. Following the tradition marked by the "Vamos Boys" bar, it is also characteristic of the "Pink Youth" to be very well organized, encourage the team for 90 minutes without stopping and accompany them to their presentations in the provinces. Its traditional location is in the south popular tribune. The club is among the most popular in Callao and competes for supporters with rivals Atlético Chalaco and Deportivo Municipal.

== Rivalries ==
=== Clasico Porteño ===
The Clasico Porteño, or Clasico Chalaco, is the most important classic in Callao and is played between the two most important clubs in the Constitutional Province of Callao, Atlético Chalaco and the Sport Boys. This derby was played regularly in the Peruvian Primera División, until Atlético Chalaco was relegated to the Copa Perú. The first official match was played on 6 June 1937, by the Amateur Tournament (ANA), Sport Boys and Atlético Chalaco. The game corresponded to the second date of the Division of Honor, which was the name that the highest division took from that year on. Since 1932, León Porteño had only participated in the Callao League and after winning it in 1935 it was invited, along with runner-up Telmo Carbajo, to be part of the aforementioned Honor Division of 1937 (in 1936 there was no tournament due to Peruvian participation in the Berlin Summer Olympics). In that tournament, among other teams that came from the First Division, there was the Sport Boys, champion of 1935, whom they had not faced before because La Misilera debuted in the highest category only in 1933.

=== Clásicos Lima-Callao ===
Other historical rivalries of the Sport Boys are those with Universitario and Alianza Lima, with whom they dispute the so-called Lima-Callao Classics, which were also extended to the clubs Deportivo Municipal and Universidad de San Martín de Porres of Callao, and Sporting Cristal of Lima.

== Current squad ==
As of 24 September 2026

Note: Flags indicate national team as defined under FIFA eligibility rules; some limited exceptions apply. Players may hold more than one non-FIFA nationality.

No.	Pos.	Nation	Player
3	DF	PER	Carlos Zambrano
4	DF	ARG	Renzo Alfani
5	MF	ARG	Federico Illanes
6	MF	PER	Leonel Solís
8	MF	ARG	Hernán Da Campo
10	FW	PER	Jostin Alarcón
11	FW	URU	Luis Urruti
12	GK	PER	Sebastian Oblitas
13	DF	PER	Mathías Llontop (on loan from Melgar)
14	FW	PER	Rolando Díaz
16	DF	PER	Sebastián Aranda
17	DF	PLE	Emilio Saba (on loan from Melgar)
21	FW	PER	Alexis Huamán
22	GK	URU	Diego Melián

No.	Pos.	Nation	Player
24	DF	PER	Oslimg Mora
26	DF	PER	Hansell Riojas (Captain)
28	MF	PER	Erick Gonzales
29	DF	PER	Nilson Loyola
30	FW	PER	Percy Liza (on loan from Melgar)
32	FW	ARG	Pablo Erustes
33	FW	PER	José Davey
36	MF	PER	Nicolas Paz
47	DF	PER	Miguel Trauco
55	DF	PER	Gustavo Dulanto (on loan from Universitario Deportes)
61	GK	PER	Jeferson Nolasco
77	MF	PER	Yuriel Celi (on loan from Universitario Deportes)
99	MF	PER	Christian Cueva (on loan from ADC Juan Pablo II College)

=== Out on loan ===
Note: Flags indicate national team as defined under FIFA eligibility rules; some limited exceptions apply. Players may hold more than one non-FIFA nationality.

No.	Pos.	Nation	Player
—	DF	PER	Renzo Salazar (at Cienciano)
—	DF	PER	Sebastián Aranda (at Auda)
—	DF	PER	Anghelo Flores (at Alianza Universidad)

== Honours ==
=== Senior titles ===
Keys

- Record
- ^{(s)} Shared record

Type	Competition	Titles	Runner-up	Winning years	Runner-up years
National (League)	Primera División	6	9	1935, 1937, 1942, 1951, 1958, 1984	1938, 1950, 1952, 1959, 1960, 1966, 1976, 1990, 1991
National (League)	Segunda División	3	—	1989, 2009, 2017	—
Half-year / Short tournament (League)	Torneo Apertura	—	2	—	1998, 2000
Half-year / Short tournament (League)	Torneo Regional	1	1	1990–I	1991–I
Half-year / Short tournament (League)	Torneo Descentralizado	1	—	1984	—
Half-year / Short tournament (League)	Torneo Zona Metropolitana	—	3	—	1990–II, 1991–I, 1991–II
Half-year / Short tournament (League)	Campeonato de Apertura (ANA)	3	—	1952, 1959, 1960	—
National (Cups)	Supercopa Movistar	—	1	—	2018
Regional (League)	División Intermedia	—	1	—	1932
Regional (League)	Segunda División Provincial de Lima	1	—	1931	—
Regional (League)	Tercera División Provincial de Lima	2	—	1928 Liga Chalaca, 1930 Zona Callao	—

=== Friendlies ===
Type	Competition	Titles	Runner-up	Winning years	Runner-up years
National (Cups)	Torneo Relámpago	3	3	1943, 1949, 1950	1946–II, 1947–II, 1956
National (Cups)	Noche Rosada	6	1	2010, 2011, 2013, 2015, 2017, 2024, 2025	2012

=== Youth team ===
Type	Competition	Titles	Runner-up	Winning years	Runner-up years
National (League)	Torneo Equipos de Reserva	—	1	—	1948

== Performance in CONMEBOL competitions ==
- Copa Libertadores: 6 appearances

1967: First round
1977: Quarter-finals
1985: Quarter-finals
1991: First round
1992: First round
2001: First round

- Copa Sudamericana: 1 appearance

2022: First round

- Copa CONMEBOL: 1 appearance

1999: Quarter-finals

== Women’s football ==
Type	Competition	Titles	Runner-up	Winning years	Runner-up years
National (League)	Liga Femenina	—	4	—	2001, 2002, 2003, 2004
Half-year / Short tournament (League)	Torneo Apertura	—	1	—	2002
Half-year / Short tournament (League)	Torneo Clausura	1	—	2002	—
Regional (League)	Liga Departamental del Callao	2	—	2024, 2025	—

== Notable players ==
- (Argentina) Fernando Martinuzzi
- (Brazil) Cláudio Adão
- (Italy) Vincenzo Gianneo
- (Peru) Armando "Tuta" Agurto
- (Peru) Jorge "Campolo" Alcalde
- (Peru) Teodoro "Prisco" Alcalde
- (Peru) Enrique Aróstegui
- (Peru) Gerónimo "Patrulla" Barbadillo
- (Peru) Alfredo Carmona
- (Peru) Jose Chacon
- (Peru) Paolo de la Haza
- (Peru) Carlos Flores
- (Peru) Mario Flores
- (Peru) Jorge Hirano
- (Peru) Valeriano López
- (Peru) Julio Meléndez
- (Peru) Juan José Muñante
- (Peru) Oswaldo "Cachito" Ramírez
- (Peru) Santiago Salazar
- (Peru) Jhonny Vegas
- (Uruguay) Waldemar Victorino

== Managers ==
- (Peru) Víctor Alcalde (1930s)
- (Peru) Raúl Chappell (1940–1942)
- (Chile) Abelardo Robles (1943–1944)
- (Peru) Enrique Aróstegui (1945–1946)
- (Peru) Telmo Carbajo
- (Peru) Miguel Rostaing (1946)
- (Peru) José Arana (1948)
- (Peru) Alfonso Huapaya (1950–1952)
- (Peru) Jorge Alcalde (1953)
- (Greece) Dan Georgiadis (1957–1958)
- (Peru) Marcos Calderón (1958–1962)
- (Brazil) José Gomes Nogueira (1964)
- (Peru) José Chiarella (1966)
- (Peru) Roberto Drago (1966)
- (Peru) César Brush (1967)
- (Peru) Diego Agurto (1968)
- (Peru) José Chiarella (1969)
- (Peru) Juan Honores (1970)
- (Brazil) Zózimo (1971)
- (Uruguay) Juan Hohberg (1972)
- (Brazil) Djalma Santos (1973)
- (Peru) Walter Milera (1973)
- (Peru) Moisés Barack (1974)
- (Peru) Diego Agurto (1974)
- (Brazil) Zózimo (1975–1976)
- (Paraguay) César Cubilla (1977)
- (Peru) José Chiarella (1978)
- (Peru) Luis Roth (1979)
- (Peru) Eloy Campos (1979–1980)
- (Peru) José Chiarella (1980–1981)
- (Peru) Walter Milera (1983)
- (Peru) Marcos Calderón (1984)
- (Uruguay) Juan Hohberg (1985)
- (Peru) Walter Milera (1986–1987)
- (Peru) Gustavo Merino (1987)
- (Peru) Augusto Palacios (1987)
- (Chile) Jaime Ramírez (1988)
- (Argentina) Vito Andrés "Sabino" Bártoli (1989)
- (Chile) Miguel Ángel Arrué (1990)
- (Peru) Miguel Company (1990)
- (Brazil) Fred (1990)
- (Peru) Miguel Company (1991)
- (Peru) Manuel Mayorga (1991)
- (Brazil) Edu (1992)
- (Peru) Hernán Saavedra (1992)
- (Peru) Manuel Mayorga (1992)
- (Peru) Roberto Challe (1993)
- (Peru) César Gonzales (1993–1994)
- (Peru) Luis Roth (1994)
- (Peru) Carlos Solís (1994)
- (Peru) Moisés Barack (1994)
- (Peru) César Gonzales (1994)
- (Brazil) José Carlos Amaral (1995)
- (Chile) Miguel Ángel Arrué (1996)
- (Brazil) Cláudio Adão (1997)
- (Paraguay) César Cubilla (1997)
- (Peru) César Gonzales (1998)
- (Serbia) Ivica Brzić (1999)
- (Peru) César Gonzales (1999)
- (Peru) Ramón Mifflin (2000)
- (Peru) Teddy Cardama (2000)
- (Peru) Ramón Mifflin (2001)
- (Peru) César Gonzales (2001)
- (Peru) Ramón Mifflin (2002)
- (Argentina) Jorge Sampaoli (2002–2003)
- (Argentina) Fernando Zamácola (2004)
- (Peru) Eusebio Salazar (2004)
- (Peru) Franco Navarro (2004–2005)
- (Peru) Juan Carlos Cabanillas (2005)
- (Peru) Eusebio Salazar (2005)
- (Peru) Roberto Mosquera (2006)
- (Argentina) Raúl Márcovich (2006)
- (Peru) César Gonzales (2006–2007)
- (Peru) Moisés Barack (2007)
- (Paraguay) Jacinto Rodríguez (2008)
- (Peru) Eusebio Salazar (2008)
- (Peru) Juan Carlos Cabanillas (2009)
- (Peru) Titín Drago (2009–2010)
- (Peru) Miguel Company (2010–2011)
- (Peru) Agustín Castillo (2011)
- (Uruguay) Claudio Techera (2012)
- (Peru) Jorge Espejo (2012–2013)
- (Uruguay) Pablo Bossi (2013)
- (Peru) Rivelino Carassa (2014)
- (Peru) Paul Cominges (2014–2015)
- (Peru) Rivelino Carassa (2015–)
- (Peru) Rainer Torres (2016)
- (Uruguay) Mario Viera (2017)
