= Killing of Anthony Alvarez =

2021 police killing of a Latino man in Chicago, Illinois, United States

- Part of United States racial unrest (2020–2023)
- Location of the incident in Portage Park.
- Date: March 31, 2021
- Time: 12:18 a.m. CDT
- Location: Portage Park, Chicago, Illinois, U.S.
- Type: Shooting
- Deaths: Anthony Alvarez

On March 31, 2021, Anthony Alvarez, a 22-year-old Latino man, was shot and killed by a Chicago Police Department officer in the Portage Park neighborhood on the Northwest Side of Chicago. Police body camera footage of Alvarez' death was released on April 28, showing Alvarez being shot in the back while fleeing from police with a firearm in his hand. The footage of Alvarez' death was the third high-profile release of footage showing police killing a young Latino in the month of April 2021, following Adam Toledo and Mario Gonzalez.

== People involved ==
=== Anthony Alvarez ===
Anthony Alvarez was a 22-year-old Latino man from Chicago. He was a father.

=== Evan Solano ===
Evan Solano also a Latino was identified as the officer who shot Alvarez. He has been an officer for the Chicago Police Department since 2015.

== Investigations and legal proceedings ==
The Civilian Office of Police Accountability has launched an investigation into the incident. A spokesperson for the organization recommended that Solano should "be relieved of police powers during the pendency of this investigation." The Cook County State's Attorney’s office announced on March 15, 2022 that Solano and his partner “created the conditions" which necessitated the use of deadly force, but that the office would not file charges in the shooting.

== Incident ==
In body cam footage of Alvarez' death, Solano can be seen pursuing Alvarez on Laramie Avenue, after what Mayor Lightfoot described as a minor traffic violation. On the sidewalk of Laramie and Eddy, Solano sees a gun in Alvarez's hand, Solano shouted "Drop the gun! Drop the gun!" before immediately firing five shots in quick succession at Alvarez' back. Alvarez final words are "Why are you shooting me?" to which Solano replies "You had a gun." Alvarez was later pronounced dead at the hospital.

== Reactions ==
=== Family ===
Alvarez's father said “I can't believe he is gone. I really miss my son. I just want some answers; why did they do this to Anthony?” At a protest for Alvarez, his aunt stated, "He didn't deserve to get killed this way. What these cops did to him, it's not right. They murdered my nephew. They killed him and they killed a part of me, a part of our family. We’re never going to be the same."

=== Protests ===
On May 1, about a hundred people marched through Portage Park in Chicago from West Irving Park Road and North Central Avenue to the site of Alvarez' death. Alvarez' family was amongst the protestors; his daughter held a sign reading "I miss my daddy." Protestors chanted "Hands up, don’t shoot" and “If Anthony don't get no justice, then they don't get no peace.” Activists stated, "We want that cop charged. We want the police defunded and that money put back into the communities."

=== Institutions ===
In response to Alvarez' death, the ACLU released a statement, saying, "Chicago communities also suffer trauma with each of these releases – especially Latino communities, which once again see how police respond to people from their neighborhoods... Chicago residents deserve meaningful changes to policing. They deserve a new policy on foot pursuits that is informed by community voices and driven by community needs – and one that actually results in changes in how police officers treat human beings."

=== Public officials ===
Chicago mayor Lori Lightfoot stated in a press conference prior to the video's release, "We can't live in a world where a minor traffic offense results in someone being shot and killed. That's not acceptable to me, and it shouldn't be acceptable to anyone." Ald. George Cardenas stated, "The guy didn't look like he was a threat to the officer. If he faces the officer with the gun, then maybe that's a reason to kind of react... But if he's not facing you, you've got to give him time to get on his knees, put his hands behind his back. The whole thing was, 'Drop the gun. Drop the gun.' Then, pow, pow, pow... The situation is not good." Cardenas also said that Illinois state law "allows you to carry a gun, so a lot of people are gonna have guns in their hands. That's not a reason to shoot anybody.”

U.S. House Representative Jesús "Chuy" García wrote on twitter, "Whether it's a 13yo or a 22yo, police encounters shouldn't end in death. The killings of Adam Toledo & Anthony Alvarez aren't isolated, rather the tip of an iceberg revealing a system tilted against Black & Brown communities. Whatever the circumstances, the killings must end."

Illinois State Representative Will Guzzardi said, "There's nothing you can do, no record on your background, no affiliations, no history, nothing you can do to deserve being shot in the back while you run. Let me repeat that. There is nothing Anthony could have done to deserve the fate that befell him. This is not an indictment of any bad apples. But rather of the very role that we have given to law enforcement, a role that they didn't ask for and that they don't want, and a role that leads inexorability to the kind of tragedy that we mourn yet again today."

== Aftermath ==
=== Foot pursuits ===
In the aftermath of both Alvarez' and Toledo's shootings, Mayor Lori Lightfoot and Chicago Police Superintendent David Brown said that changes to the city's foot-pursuit policy would be in place by the end of the summer of 2021. The city's practice has been under scrutiny since 2017, when a Department of Justice report called foot pursuits "'inherently dangerous' because officers can experience fatigue or adrenaline, which can compromise their ability to make sound judgments or use less force as the threat diminishes."

The city's police is currently under a federal consent decree, which requires the department to make reforms to its policing practices. In 2020, a civil rights lawsuit forced Chicago to retrain its officers on foot pursuit tactics, but the court-mandated independent monitoring team has warned that officers don't have "the requisite buy-in" on the reforms, because "There is a sense that these concepts go against the culture of the organization."

== See also ==
- List of homicides in Illinois
- Lists of killings by law enforcement officers in the United States
- Police violence against Mexican Americans
