= Raúl Chappell =

Peruvian footballer (1911-1977)

Personal information
- Full name: Raúl Chappell Morales
- Date of birth: 23 July 1911
- Place of birth: Callao, Peru
- Date of death: May 1977 (aged 65)
- Place of death: U.S.
- Position: Defender

Youth career
- Unión Buenos Aires
- Sport Boys

Senior career*
Years	Team	Apps	(Gls)
1928–1930	Sport Boys		
1931–1932	Alianza Callao		
1933–1939	Sport Boys		

International career
1938–1939	Peru	7	(0)

Managerial career
- 1943: Sport Boys
- 1954: Peru U-20
Medal record
Representing Peru
Association football
Bolivarian Games
Gold medal – first place	Colombia 1938
Copa América
Gold medal – first place	Peru 1939
- * Club domestic league appearances and goals

Raúl Chappell Morales (23 July 1911 in Callao, Peru – May 1977 in the United States) was a Peruvian football player. He is best known for having played in Club Sport Boys of Peru and for the Peru national football team. He was part of Peru's squad at the 1936 Summer Olympics, but he did not play in any matches. He also became a coach after the end of his career as a player.
