= Fabrizio Lora =

Peruvian footballer (born 2005)

Personal information
- Full name: Fabián Fabrizio Lora Saavedra
- Date of birth: 30 August 2005 (age 21)
- Place of birth: Callao, Peru
- Height: 1.72 m (5 ft 8 in)
- Position: Right-back

Team information
- Current team: Sporting Cristal
- Number: 37

Senior career*
Years	Team	Apps	(Gls)
2023–	Sporting Cristal	3	(0)

International career^{‡}
2024–	Peru U20	7	(1)
- * Club domestic league appearances and goals as of 28 February 2026 ‡ National team caps and goals as of 29 January 2025

Fabián Fabrizio Lora Saavedra (born 30 August 2005), better known as Fabrizio Lora, is a Peruvian professional footballer who plays as a right-back for Peruvian Primera División club Sporting Cristal and the Peru national under-17.
