= Rivelino Carassa =

Peruvian footballer and coach (born 1974)

Personal information
- Full name: Elso Rivelino Carassa La Rosa
- Date of birth: 21 September 1974 (age 52)
- Place of birth: Callao, Peru
- Height: 1.91 m (6 ft 3 in)
- Position: Defender

Team information
- Current team: Sport Boys (assistant manager)

Youth career
- 1989–1992: Alianza Lima

Senior career*
Years	Team	Apps	(Gls)
1993–1997	Sport Boys		
1998	Deportivo Pesquero		
1999	Deportivo Municipal		
2000	Deportivo Wanka	21	(0)
2000–2001	Sport Boys	23	(2)
2001–2002	Deportivo Wanka		
2002	Sport Boys		
2003–2004	FC Spartak Vladikavkaz	5	(0)
2005–2009	FBC Melgar		
2010	Sport Boys	7	(0)

Managerial career
- 2014: Sport Boys
- 2015–: Sport Boys (assistant)
- * Club domestic league appearances and goals

Elso Rivelino Carassa La Rosa (born 21 September 1974 in Callao) is a Peruvian football coach and a former player. He is an assistant manager with Sport Boys.
