= Vincenzo Gianneo =

Italian former association footballer

Personal information
- Date of birth: 25 December 1985 (age 40)
- Place of birth: Italy
- Position: Midfielder

Senior career*
Years	Team	Apps	(Gls)
2003–2004	Roccaravinda		
2005	Siracusa		
2005–2006	Muggia		
2006–2007	Sevegliano		
2007–2008	San Sergio		
2008	Sport Boys		
2009	Sport Áncash		
2010	Clodiense		
2011	Ponziana		
2011–2013	Manzanese		
- * Club domestic league appearances and goals

Vincenzo Gianneo (born 25 December 1985) is an Italian former footballer who is last known to have played as a midfielder for Manzanese. Besides Italy, he has played in Peru.

== Early life ==
Gianneo was born in 1985 in Trieste, Italy, before living in Aurisina, Italy, where he began playing football at a young age.

== Playing career ==
In 2008, he signed for Peruvian top flight side Sport Boys, where he wore the number eight jersey, became a fan favorite and was nicknamed "Gattuso" after the Italian international, but suffered relegation to the Peruvian second tier. He aimed to establish himself as an important player in the Peruvian leagues and got a tattoo of Sport Boys on his back to show his dedication to the club.

However, he eventually left Sport Boys due to lack of payments, before signing for Peruvian top flight side Sport Áncash, where his playing performance was regarded as poor. Altogether, he made twenty-four appearances for both Peruvian sides combined before trialing for Chilean side San Marcos de Arica. After that, he signed for Italian side Ponziana, before signing for Italian side Manzanese.

== Style of play ==
Gianneo mainly operated as an offensive midfielder. He is known for his physical ability.

== Post-playing career ==
After retiring from professional football, Gianneo owned a football academy with Argentina international Walter Silváni. He also worked as a model.

== Television career ==
After retiring from professional football, Gianneo also participated in Peruvian reality teelvion show Combate, where he was part of the 'Air' team with Diana Sánchez, Israel Dreyfus, and Korina Rivadeneira, among other people, and was known for being rejected on live television by Darlene Rosas.

== Managerial career ==
After retiring from professional football, Gianneo worked as a youth manager in Peru and Croatia. After that, he worked as manager of the Juventus Academy in Argentina. After that, he was appointed youth manager of Chilean side Audax Italiano.

== Personal life ==
Gianneo has a sister. He has family in Trieste, Italy. He is a Christian.
