= Mario Gonzales Benites =

Peruvian footballer and manager (1937–2022)

Personal information
- Date of birth: 19 January 1937
- Place of birth: Lima, Peru
- Date of death: 28 October 2022 (aged 85)
- Place of death: Lima, Peru

Youth career
- Alianza Lima

Senior career*
Years	Team	Apps	(Gls)
- Mariscal Sucre
- Deportivo Municipal

Managerial career
- 1970: Carlos A. Mannucci
- 1971: Deportivo SIMA
- 1971–1972: Nacional Asunción
- 1973: Melgar
- 1974: Peru U20
- 1974: Barcelona SC
- 1975: Deportivo Junín
- 1975: Cerro Porteño
- 1976: León de Huánuco
- 1977: Alianza Lima
- 1978: Deportivo Municipal
- 1978: Juventud La Palma
- 1979: Nacional Asunción
- 1979–1980: Sol de América
- 1981: Tembetary
- 1983: River Plate Asunción
- 1984: Portuguesa
- 1985–1986: Carlos A. Mannucci
- 1987: Deportivo Saprissa
- 1988: Deportivo Junín
- 1989: Nacional Asunción
- 1990: Olimpia (reserves)
- 1993: Unión Minas
- 1995: Nacional Asunción
- 2000: Nacional Asunción
- * Club domestic league appearances and goals

Mario Gonzales Benites (19 January 1937 – 28 October 2022), nicknamed La Foca (the seal), is a Peruvian football manager and former player. He was naturalized as a Paraguayan.

He is one of the iconic coaches of Club Nacional (Paraguay), which he managed five times and with which he won two second division championships in 1979 and 1989.

== Biography ==
Having come through the ranks at Alianza Lima, Mario Gonzales had the opportunity to play for Mariscal Sucre and then Deportivo Municipal. He prematurely ended his playing career to pursue coaching. In 1970, he managed Carlos A. Mannucci, followed by Deportivo SIMA the following year. After several stints with provincial clubs (FBC Melgar, Deportivo Junín, and León de Huánuco), he took over as manager of Alianza Lima in 1977. Just as he was about to win the league title, he was dismissed by the Alianza management a few matches before the end of the season (replaced by Uruguayan Juan Hohberg, who would go on to win the title at the end of the season).

In 1978, he won his first coaching title with Juventud La Palma, leading them to the Copa Perú. But it was in Paraguay that Mario Gonzales would truly distinguish himself. After winning the second division title with Club Nacional in 1979, he led Sol de América to the final of the 1979 Paraguayan championship against Olimpia, a match they narrowly lost (0–1, 0–0). He would have the opportunity to manage Club Nacional again, notably securing a second second division title in 1989.

Besides Peru and Paraguay, he also managed Barcelona S.C. (Ecuador), Deportivo Saprissa (Costa Rica), and Portuguesa F.C. (Venezuela).

Having retired from football, he died on 28 October 2022 in Lima.

== Honours ==
=== Manager ===
Juventud La Palma

- Copa Perú: 1978

Club Nacional

- APF División Intermedia (2): 1979, 1989
