= South American Youth Championships =

South American Youth Championships may refer to:

- South American Youth Football Championship
- South American Youth Handball Championship
- South American U18 Championships in Athletics, formerly known as the South American Youth Championships in Athletics
