= Killing of Mario Gonzalez =

2021 in-custody death of a Latino man in Alameda, California, United States

- Part of United States racial unrest (2020–2023)
- Location of the incident in Alameda.
- Date: April 19, 2021
- Time: 10:45 a.m.
- Location: Alameda, California, U.S.
- Deaths: Mario Gonzalez

On April 19, 2021, Mario Gonzalez, an unarmed 26-year-old Latino man, died while under police custody by the Alameda, California Police Department. In their initial report of the incident, the department reported that Gonzalez died after a "scuffle" and "physical altercation" resulting in a "medical emergency." The Gonzalez family's attorney called the police's descriptions of his death "misinformation."

In body cam footage released on April 27, Gonzalez could be seen being pinned to the ground for more than five minutes while officers stated, "Please stop resisting us." At one point, Gonzalez told the officers, "Please don't do this to me," before eventually becoming unresponsive. He was later pronounced dead at a hospital. His death was ruled a homicide.

== People involved ==
Mario Arenales Gonzalez (December 24, 1994 – April 19, 2021) was a 26-year-old man from Oakland, California. He was a father and was the primary caretaker of his mother and brother, who has autism. He worked as a chef and construction worker.

The officers involved with Gonzalez's death were identified as Eric McKinley, who has been on the force for three years, Cameron Leahy, who has been on the force for three years, and James Fisher, who has been on the force for 10 years. The three men have been placed on paid administrative leave.

== Incident ==
Police body camera footage of the death (59 m 08 s)

Officer McKinley approached Gonzalez at a park after police said they were responding to reports of a man who was believed to be intoxicated and suspected of theft. Audio from the 9-1-1 call showed the complaint stated Gonzalez was "not doing anything wrong" but "just scaring my wife." Gonzalez was in the park with two Walgreens baskets and two open alcohol bottles. He spoke with the officers calmly before they requested his identification, which he did not or could not produce. An officer said, "Please put your hand behind your back ... please stop resisting us." The officers pushed Gonzalez facedown into mulch, placing a knee on his back and holding him down with their arms for four minutes as Gonzalez gasped for air and said, "I didn't do nothing" and "Please don't do this." One officer said they "have no weight on his chest." Gonzalez lost consciousness, at which point the officers rolled him over, performed CPR, and delivered Narcan. He was pronounced dead later in hospital.

== Investigation and legal proceedings ==
The incident is under investigation by the Alameda County Sheriff's Department, the Alameda County district attorney's office, and Louise Renne, a former San Francisco city attorney, who was hired to conduct an independent investigation. City officials stated they are "committed to full transparency and accountability in the aftermath of Mr. Gonzalez's death."

Alameda's interim police chief stated it was unclear whether officers used justifiable action, or excessive force and that the investigation was ongoing. Both the Gonzalez family's attorney and the department stated they were waiting for the autopsy and toxicology reports.

=== Autopsy ===
On May 7, the Alameda County Sheriff’s office requested outside agencies to assist in reviewing Gonzalez autopsy, citing the need for "public trust."

An autopsy report was issued on December 10, 2021, naming Gonzalez's death a homicide, with methamphetamine toxicity as the leading cause. Attorneys for his family dispute this, stating that Gonzalez would not have died were it not for being restrained in a prone position, with multiple officers on his back, for over five minutes.

=== Civil rights lawsuit ===
On April 30, the Gonzalez family's lawyer announced the family would be filing a civil rights lawsuit against the Alameda Police Department. The family stated Gonzalez complied with the officers, and the actions of the police violated his rights.

=== Calls for FBI investigation ===
On April 30, the League of United Latin American Citizens (LULAC) sent a letter to U.S. Attorney General Merrick Garland asking for an FBI investigation. LULAC president Domingo Garcia wrote, "We understand that the Alameda County Sheriff, the Alameda County District Attorney, and the City of Alameda are conducting independent investigations. We expect that those investigations will focus on the Use of Force by those officers in a criminal context. This is a request for an investigation into whether Mr. Gonzalez’ Civil Rights were violated by these officers. In the aftermath of George Floyd’s murder and in consideration of the Georgia Sheriff who was recently indicted April 27, 2021 on use of unreasonable force found in an FBI Civil Rights Violation investigation. We urge you to complete an investigation into the matter of Mario Gonzalez as soon as practicable.”

== Reactions ==
=== Family ===
Gonzalez's brother stated, "Everything we saw in that video was unnecessary and unprofessional. The police killed my brother in the same manner that they killed George Floyd." Gonzalez's mother said, "He's a lovely guy. He's respectful, all the time. They broke my family for no reason." The family also blamed the police for Gonzalez's death, saying the "police escalated what should have been a minor, peaceful encounter" with an unarmed man. Julia Sherwin, a lawyer representing the Gonzalez family, stated, "His death was completely avoidable and unnecessary. Drunk guy in a park doesn't equal a capital sentence."

=== Protests ===
Protests occurred in Alameda, where activists marched in the same neighborhood where Gonzalez died. The group of activists hoped to “wake up” the neighborhood and demand "white people stop calling the police on Black and brown people." Activists released a statement saying, "Your irrational fear — which is truly about power, control, and domination — stole Mario’s life from his son, his brothers, his mother." On May 3, around a hundred students from Oakland Technical High School marched in honor of Gonzalez; the students began at Oscar Grant Plaza and ended at the Alameda Police Department.

=== Experts ===
Geoffrey Alpert, a professor of criminology at the University of South Carolina criticized the officers' actions as "the worst thing that could have happened," he stated, "Once they're controlling him, as we learned from the Floyd trial with all those medical experts, this position or compression is deadly. Obviously he's in some sort of mental crisis, and what's the goal? What are they trying to do with him? Was he a danger?"

Ed Obayashi, a Northern California sheriff's deputy and police trainer, stated, "There is going to be a very intensive inquiry on this. It is rare that a non-threatening, non-belligerent person ends up dying like this. What was the officers' justification for detaining him? This individual was not a threat to the officers. This is another tragic incident of compression asphyxia." Seth Stoughton, a former-Florida police officer and a USC professor of law, stated "the dangers of positional asphyxia" were well-known with policemen, and compared the tactic to a "boa constrictor killing its prey by depriving it of oxygen."

John Burris, an Oakland lawyer who specializes in police abuse cases and represented Rodney King in his civil rights lawsuit, stated it is "common knowledge" within law enforcement departments that pinning people down has "inherent" risk. He stated, "But they still do it. Why do they still do it? It's the rush of business. People get caught up."

=== Institutions ===
CURYJ Executive Director George Galvis stated, "We have seen this play out time and time again. Police come up with a false narrative until footage is revealed and the truth comes out. They did this to 13-year-old Adam Toledo, and they would have done it to George Floyd if there wasn't community recording."

Jennifer Stark, an attorney with Disability Rights California, stated, "This was a tragic and avoidable incident that once again demonstrates the danger of involving law enforcement and interactions with people experiencing mental health crises and substance-use issues. This is not a violent person. There were no safety issues raised. There were some concerns potentially about mental health issues. And this is one of those cases where it would have been perfectly appropriate to involve mental health professionals to come in to speak with Mario and to de-escalate the situation. There was no crisis, until the law enforcement got involved."

=== Public officials ===
Alameda mayor Marilyn Ezzy Ashcraft stated, "I'm just heartsick. This is a young man. This shouldn't have happened."

On Twitter, former-Housing and Urban Development Secretary Julian Castro wrote, "Police in Alameda, CA wrote in a report that Mario Gonzalez was violent before his arrest and died in the hospital after a 'medical emergency.' Body cam footage shows he was calm and peaceful. He died on-site after they knelt on his back for 5 minutes."

U.S. House Representative Pramila Jayapal wrote, "This makes me sick, heartbroken, disgusted, frustrated. Everything. Mario Arenales Gonzalez goes from living to dead at the hands of police. He was afraid of being handcuffed for nothing — afraid he would be killed. And he was. There must be justice." Former-Congresswoman Debbie Mucarsel-Powell wrote, "Something is wrong when you're a person of color & as a parent you have to worry literally every time they step out the door. There's no freedom in American when you are murdered bc of the color of your skin. #NoMas."

== Aftermath ==
The footage of Gonzalez's death has been compared to the murder of George Floyd by Derek Chauvin, who was convicted of murder on the day after Gonzalez's death.

=== Proposed reforms ===
In the aftermath of Gonzalez' death, the Alameda City Council planned a special session to discuss immediate police reforms, including the creation of a civilian police oversight board, a revision of the department's use of force policies, and new requirement for a "non-police response" to certain types of 9-1-1 calls. In March 2021, Alameda voted to pursue a long-term program to send mental health professionals to some 9-1-1 calls, rather than police. Michael Lawlor, an associate professor of criminal justice at the University of New Haven, suggested that a program such as Oregon's CAHOOTS would connect people to health services rather than simply incarcerating them.

On the state level, some have called for the passage of Democratic Assemblyman Mike Gipson's Assembly Bill 490 which would outlaw "positional asphyxia," a form of apprehension that compresses an individual's airways and reduces their ability to breathe regularly. Assemblyman Gibson stated, "This does not mean that a police officer can no longer restrain anyone when they need to for public safety, but it would mean that they cannot keep anyone from breathing/losing oxygen when restraining them."
