= Miguel Company =

Peruvian football manager (born 1945)

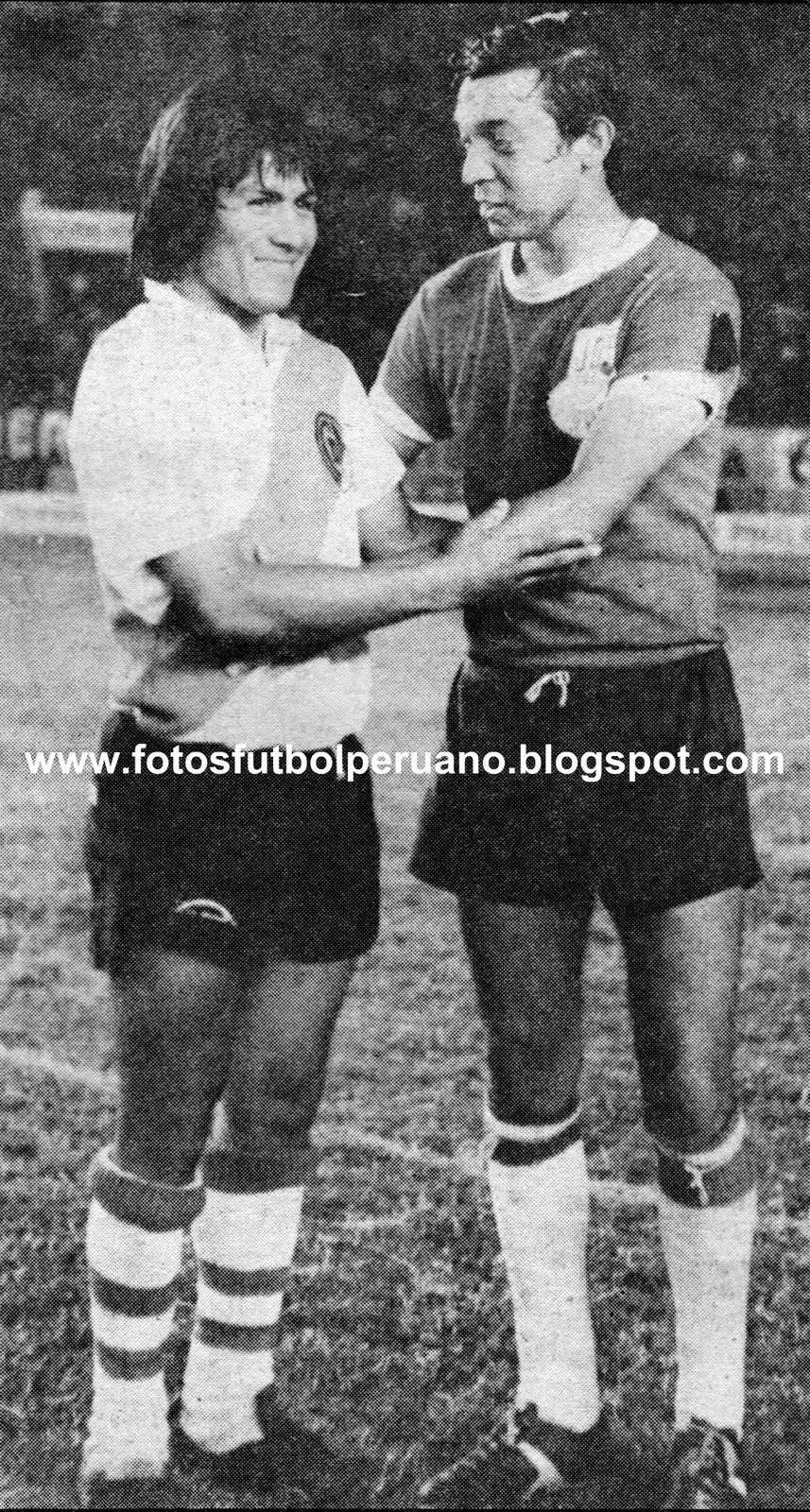
- Company with Hugo Sotil in 1973

Personal information
- Full name: Miguel Alejandro Company Chumpitazi
- Date of birth: 12 January 1945 (age 81)
- Place of birth: Lima, Peru
- Position: Defender

Senior career*
| Years | Team | Apps | (Gls) |
| 1965–1969 | Juan Aurich | | |
| 1970–1973 | José Gálvez | | |

Managerial career
- 1985: ADT
- 1985: Juventud La Joya
- 1985: Colegio Nacional Iquitos
- 1986: Hungaritos Agustinos
- 1986: Unión Huaral
- 1987–1988: Sporting Cristal
- 1989: Alianza Lima
- 1990–1991: Sport Boys
- 1991: Peru
- 1992–1993: Deportivo Cali
- 1993: Veracruz
- 1994–1995: Peru
- 1997–1998: Honduras
- 1999: Universitario
- 2000: Saprissa
- 2000–2004: Cuba
- 2010–2011: Sport Boys
- 2012: Sport Huancayo
- * Club domestic league appearances and goals

Miguel Alejandro Company Chumpitazi (born 12 January 1945) is a Peruvian football coach, former player (1965–1973), and sports reporter.

== Playing career ==
Company did not have a great track record during his playing days. He did manage to play for notable teams such as Chiclayo based club Juan Aurich and José Gálvez FBC of Chimbote around the 1970s.

== Managerial career ==
In the early 1980s Company contributed to Peruvian magazine Ovación by interviewing football figures such as César Luis Menotti. Then in 1985 he would start his managerial career with Asociación Deportiva Tarma in the 1985 Torneo Descentralizado season. In his first two years as a manager he coached several clubs in a very short time such as Juventud La Joya, Colegio Nacional de Iquitos, Hungaritos Agustinos, and Unión Huaral.

Then in 1987 Company had his first experience in charge of a big Peruvian club, Sporting Cristal. Lasting only one year and a half, he was in charge of the Celestes for the 1987 Torneo Descentralizado which extended into early 1980 and left before the start of the 1988 Torneo Descentralizado. He did however manage to win his first trophy with Sporting Cristal in the 1988 Marlboro Cup tournament.

Company then went on to have a short spell with Alianza Lima in the 1989 Torneo Descentralizado. He helped the club to a strong start to the season but then later struggled in the second half. Then he was in charge of Sport Boys for 1990 Torneo Descentralizado and led the club to a Copa Libertadores groupstage place by winning the Liguilla Final. He left right after and came back for the 1991 season only to leave again a few months later.

Company then managed the Peru national team in two Copa America tournaments (1991 and 1995). In both editions of the Copa America, he could not lead Peru out of the first group stage. During the 1991 edition he had physical altercations with a journalist and later with his player, Andrés Gonzales, who refused to play against Paraguay. Gonzales was later banned from playing for Peru for two years.

He was also in charge of the Honduras national team in 1997 and 1998, and the Cuba national team from 2000 to 2004. In terms of national clubs, he led the Peruvian team Universitario de Deportes to a Torneo Apertura cup in 1999.

=== Manager ===
Sporting Cristal

- 1988 Marlboro Cup

Universitario de Deportes

- Torneo Apertura: 1999
