= Killing of Adam Toledo =

2021 police killing in Chicago, Illinois, US

- Part of 2020–2023 United States racial unrest
- Bodycam video still image of Adam Toledo immediately before he was shot
- Location of the incident in Little Village
- Date: March 29, 2021
- Time: 2:38 a.m. (CDT)
- Location: South Lawndale, Chicago, Illinois, U.S.; 41°50′53.7″N 87°42′25.2″W
- Type: Police killing, shooting
- Participants: Eric Stillman
- Deaths: Adam Toledo
- Charges: None

On March 29, 2021, Adam Toledo, a 13-year-old Latino American boy, was shot and killed by Chicago Police Department (CPD) officer Eric Stillman in the Little Village neighborhood on the West Side of Chicago at 2:38 a.m. local time.

On April 10, during a proffer reading in court for criminal charges filed against the adult who gave Toledo the handgun involved in the incident, a Cook County assistant prosecutor falsely told the judge that Toledo was holding the gun at the time Toledo was shot; the assistant prosecutor was later placed on administrative leave for this statement. On April 15, Stillman's body cam video recording was released, showing Toledo running away and dropping a handgun before he turned towards Stillman and raised his empty hands. According to the Chicago Police Department, Stillman shot at the boy less than a second after he dropped the gun. An area resident who said she witnessed the shooting from her apartment window across the street said that Toledo was complying with the officer's requests when he was shot.

The release of the body cam video sparked protests in Chicago and around the country. Toledo was one of the youngest people killed by the police in the state of Illinois in years. His death has been connected by some analysts to a broader pattern of disproportionate police violence against Latinos and other children of color. It also occurred as the United States was grappling with several high-profile cases of police killing unarmed people of color.

In May 2021, the First Assistant State's Attorney who had reviewed the inaccurate proffer was forced to resign. In March 2022, authorities announced there would be no criminal charges brought against the officer involved in the killing of Toledo. The Assistant State's Attorney who gave the inaccurate proffer later became a judicial candidate in 2023.

== People involved ==
=== Adam Toledo ===
Adam Toledo (May 26, 2007 – March 29, 2021) was Mexican American. At the time of his death, he was a seventh-grader in the special-education program at Gary Elementary School from the Little Village neighborhood in Chicago. He had no prior criminal record and was 13 years old when he was killed.

=== Ruben Roman ===
Ruben Roman is a 21-year-old who was with Toledo. He was arrested by the CPD at the scene. He is alleged to have ties to the Latin Kings criminal gang.

=== Eric Stillman ===
Eric Stillman is the 34-year-old police officer who shot Toledo. He has worked for the CPD since 2015. He was placed on administrative leave for 30 days following the incident. On May 6, 2021, it was announced Stillman had not returned to the CPD, though his routine leave had already ended.

On March 15, 2022, Kim Foxx’s office announced Stillman would not be charged for killing Toledo, due to insufficient evidence to file criminal charges. In April 2023, disciplinary charges alleging multiple rule violations in relation to Toledo's shooting were filed against Stillman, and the Department recommended that Stillman be fired. The decision regarding Stillman would be decided by the Chicago Police Board.

== Incident ==
=== Initial reports ===
1 Stillman exits vehicle, pursues Toledo
2 Stillman shoots Toledo

External videos
- Raw footage of the shooting from Stillman's body camera on Vimeo (9 m 56 s).

Prosecutors alleged that at around 2:30 a.m., Toledo and Roman were walking toward 24th Street when Roman fired multiple rounds as a vehicle passed. Police ShotSpotter detector technology registered shots fired and a squad car arrived at the scene. According to a statement from prosecutors, Toledo ran away from the officers that arrived, was chased into an alleyway, turned back to the officers with a gun in his hand, and was then shot by officer Eric Stillman in the chest. The police said that a handgun was recovered at the scene from behind a fence.

Around 5:00 a.m., a CPD spokesman tweeted "one subject fled on foot which resulted in an armed confrontation." Around 4:00 p.m., the department released an official press release stating, "One armed offender fled from the officers. A foot pursuit ensued which resulted in a confrontation". Several days later, Cook County prosecutor James Murphy issued a statement in court alleging that Toledo was armed when he was killed. Following the public release of body cam footage, Murphy was placed on administrative leave over the statements, and the Cook County State's Attorney opened an internal investigation into the matter, including into whether or not Murphy had access to the footage at the time he made them. On May 5, 2021, Murphy's supervisor, First Assistant State's Attorney Jennifer Coleman, was forced to resign when it was determined that she failed to prepare Murphy correctly with late minute additions to what material facts were known at the time.

=== Body cam footage ===
Body cam footage of Toledo's shooting, released on April 15, 2021, showed that Toledo was unarmed at the moment he was shot. The video shows officer Stillman chasing Toledo into the alleyway and yelling at him to stop. Toledo slows down and stops as Stillman catches up to him. In footage taken from another angle, Toledo appears to throw a pistol behind a fence just before turning to face the officer (body cam footage shows a pistol being recovered behind the fence two minutes after the shooting). Stillman yells "Show me your fucking hands" and "drop it" while flashing a strobe flashlight at him. Toledo turns around with his empty hands in the air, and Stillman then shoots Toledo as he does so.

According to the CPD, there were 838 milliseconds (0.838 or ^{5}/_{6} of a second) "between gun shown in hand and single shot".

After shooting Toledo, officer Stillman called for medical assistance and began to perform CPR on him. Toledo was pronounced dead at the scene.

== Investigations and legal proceedings ==
Chicago Mayor Lori Lightfoot called for reforms to how police pursue individuals on foot and called for a "thorough, expeditious" investigation.

=== Autopsy ===
On May 6, a Chicago medical examiner concluded Adam was killed by "a single bullet which entered the left side of his chest and exited the right side of his back".

=== Stillman investigation ===
On April 19, 2021, it was reported that Stillman had been interviewed by Cook County prosecutors as a part of their review of Toledo's death. That same day, it was reported Stillman had been listed as a victim on an incident report, which one law-enforcement expert said was a tactic used to shift the "focus of culpability and blame onto the actual victim of the police deadly-force incident, i.e., the person who the police killed." Stillman was ultimately not charged for the killing.

=== Roman charges ===
Ruben Roman, the 21-year-old who was arrested on the night of Toledo's death, was charged with felony counts of child endangerment, aggravated unlawful use of a weapon and reckless discharge of a firearm. He was released on bail on April 19, 2021, after the Chicago Community Bond Fund paid his bond. A representative of the organization stated, “We are aware that the city will continue to use him as a scapegoat for the killing of Adam Toledo, which was committed by the Chicago Police Department.” In 2022, Roman was acquitted on the weapons charges.

=== State's Attorney investigation ===
On April 17, 2021, Kim Foxx, the Cook County State's Attorney, announced an investigation into why prosecutor's earlier descriptions of the shooting of Adam Toledo hadn't matched the video. Later that day, Foxx's office announced James Murphy, the prosecutor who had provided the "misleading" description of the video, would be placed on administrative leave. During a press conference on April 22, Foxx addressed the investigation, saying, "This is about the expectation of law enforcement to be forthright and transparent. There is no sacrificial lamb here. This is about making sure that we get it right and when we don't get it right, owning it doing what we need to do to make sure that it doesn't happen again."

After Foxx admitted that she had neither watched the full video nor reviewed Murphy's statements prior to the court hearing, individuals such as a former-Representative Luis Gutierrez criticized her office. Gutierrez stated, "I would’ve spoken out earlier. I would've reached out. But you know what I thought? I said, the kid had a gun. He pointed it at the police officer. And then I saw the video. I didn't see a gun. What I saw was a frightened 13-year-old kid getting shot by a police officer."

On May 5, Foxx' office announced it had concluded its investigation, stating that Murphy "did not intend to give the impression that Adam Toledo was holding a gun when shot," that he had returned to his assignment, and was no longer on leave. First Assistant State's Attorney Jennifer Coleman announced she would resign following the office's investigation.

=== Calls for DOJ investigation ===
On April 20, 2021, a group of Latino law associations, including the Hispanic Lawyers Association of Illinois, the American Bar Association's Commission on Hispanic Legal Rights & Responsibilities, the Pilsen Law Center, and the Puerto Rican Bar Association of Illinois, called on the Department of Justice to launch a formal investigation into Toledo's death. The founder of the Pilsen Law Center stated, "Faith and trust in the police department are in short supply in the Latino community. An objective investigation conducted by the Justice Department would send a message to our community that this time is different." A DOJ investigation was not ultimately opened regarding the killing.

== Reactions ==
=== Protests ===
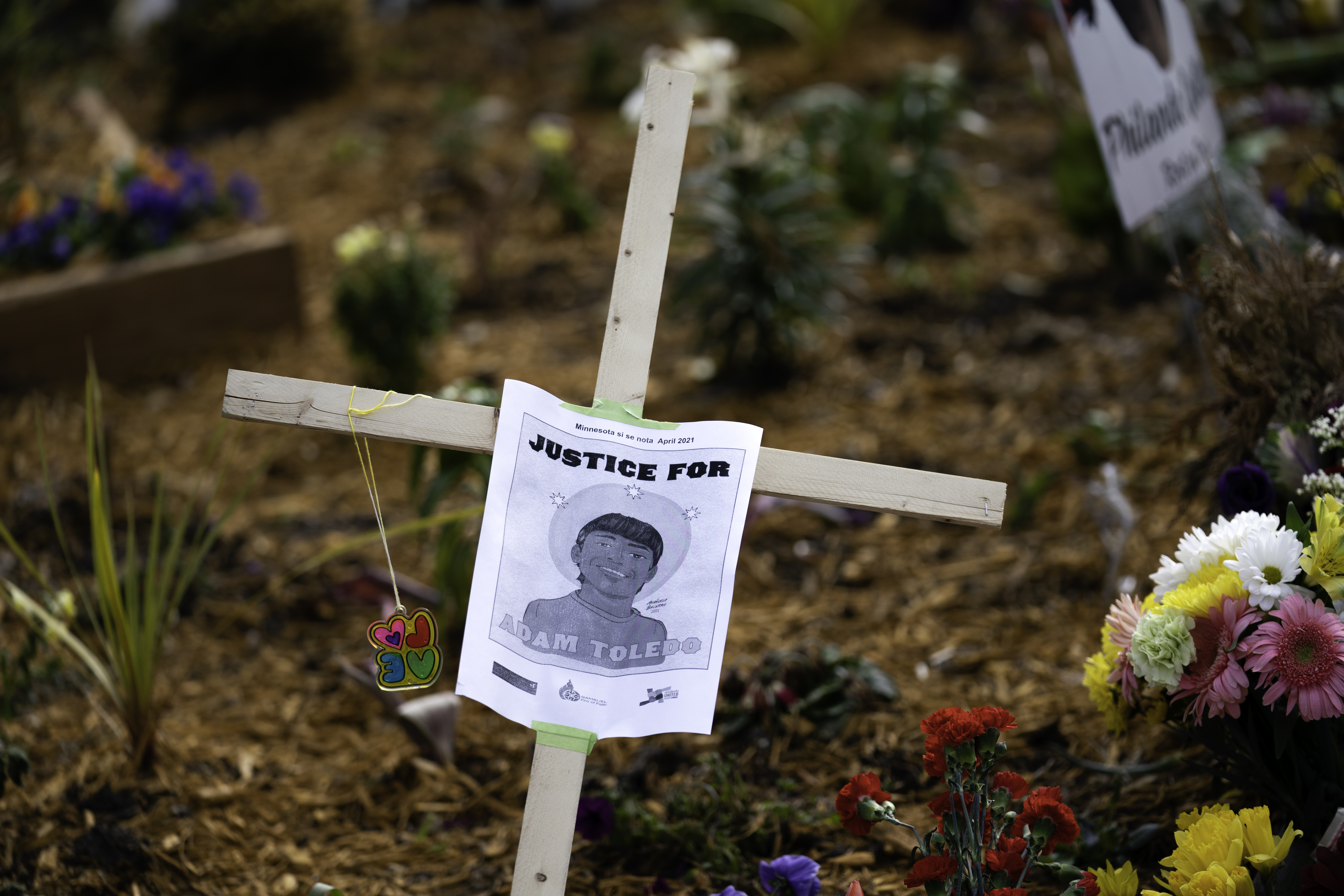
Justice for Adam Toledo sign at George Floyd Square in Minneapolis

Protests erupted in Chicago in the days following Toledo's death.

In the lead up to the release of the body cam footage, all Chicago police officers' days off were cancelled to "ensure public safety". During the press conference releasing the body cam footage, Mayor Lightfoot stated that the city would be putting into place plans to prepare for unrest.

In Chicago, protests in response to the video were peaceful. On April 15, several protests took place following the release of the body cam footage, one of which shut down traffic on northbound Michigan Avenue, and another of which occurred at Union Park. On April 16, protests of thousands of people were reported in Logan Square. Protestors chanted slogans like "Hands Up, Don't Shoot", "No justice, no peace", "Justice for Adam Toledo", and "Stop Racist Police Terror". Protestors called for Stillman's arrest, and for Lightfoot's resignation, citing her slow response to release information about the incident publicly. Lightfoot announced she would not resign. Protests and vigils for Toledo spread to other major cities in the United States.

=== Family ===
The Toledo family released a statement on April 16 that implored "everyone who gathers in Adam's name to remain peaceful, respectful and nonviolent and to continue to work constructively and tirelessly for reform." Toledo's mother also said, "Adam was a sweet and loving boy. He would not want anyone else to be injured or die in his name." Toledo's older brother said Adam "wasn't a bad kid like everyone says he was. Us being little kids, we all made mistakes ... kids will be kids and will make mistakes, but will learn from them – something my little brother didn't get the chance to do." The Toledo family's lawyer, Adeena Weiss-Ortiz, said "The last time his mother saw him, she was putting him to bed in the room that he shared with his 11-year-old brother. And the next time she saw him, he was in the morgue."

=== Media ===
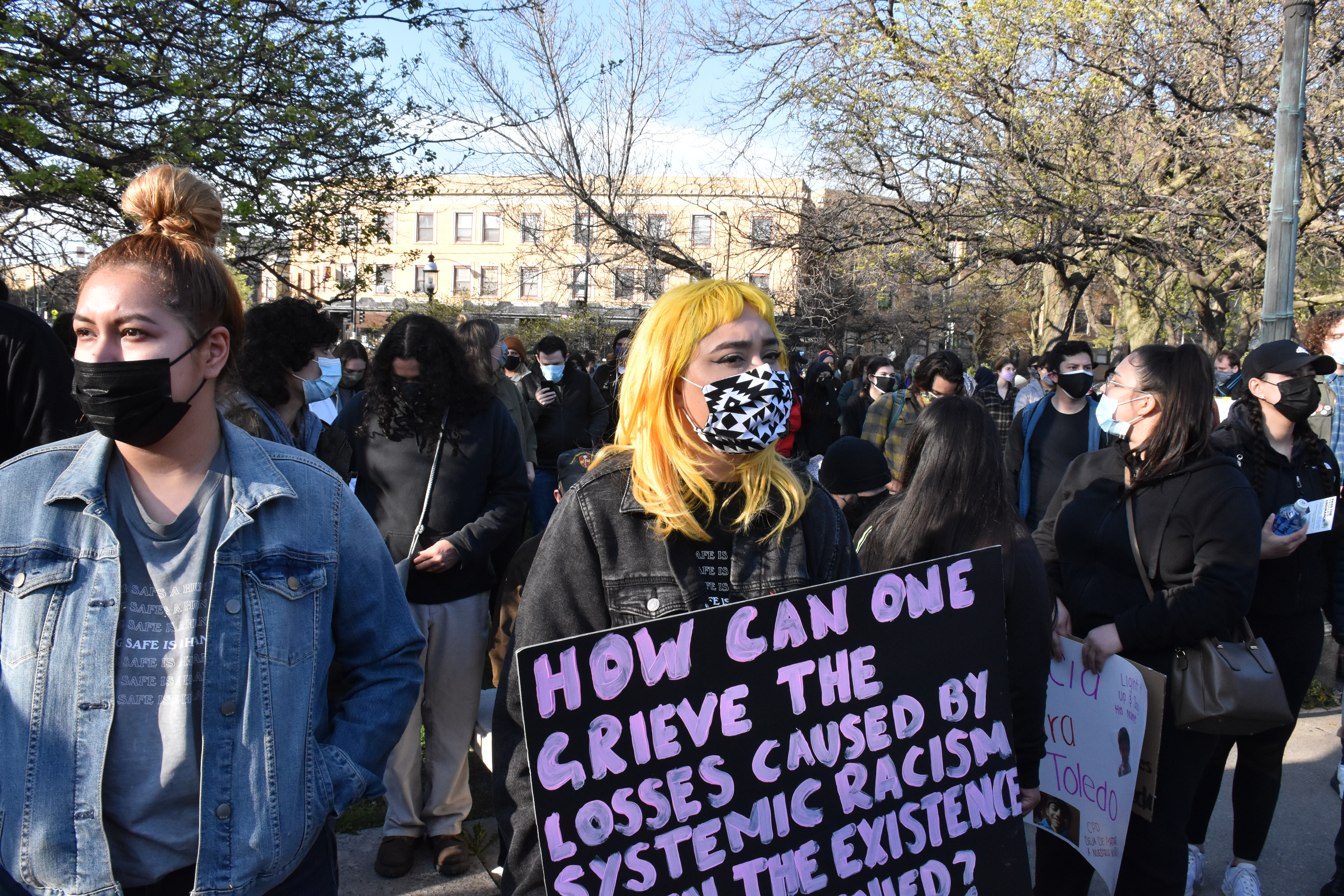
Rally for Adam Toledo, 4-16-21

In the aftermath of the shooting, Toledo and his family became targets of criticism by some commentators. In an interview with CNN, a police union representative described Toledo as a gang member and his killer as "heroic". Some attacked Toledo's mother. After implications were made that Toledo was a street kid, his family stated, “We want to correct the hurtful and false mischaracterization of Adam as a lonely child of the street who had no one to turn to. This is simply not true.” Eddie Bocanegra, of READI Chicago, criticized those attacking Toledo's mother, telling The New Yorker, “It's bullshit... People ask, ‘What was he doing out at two-thirty,’ or they talk shit about his mom. Everyone's so quick to judge."

Some media commentators, such as John Oliver, criticized Chicago's changing characterizations of the shooting; Oliver stated, "We couldn't even finish writing about what happened to Daunte Wright before the city of Chicago released video of one of their officers killing a 13-year-old unarmed child, Adam Toledo—footage which clearly contradicted the picture of an armed confrontation painted by the police and the mayor, as well as a prosecutor who said Toledo had a gun in his hand when he was shot, which he did not."

Columnist Eric Zorn wrote an op-ed in the Chicago Tribune on April 6, 2021, saying it was "too early to say with confidence" what happened and thus Toledo should not be portrayed as a "martyr" until more facts come out. His comments were received with outrage. Days later in another op-ed, Zorn wrote that the "less supportive response" to his comments "took fair exception to my chilly, analytical tone ... I regret that tone. In focusing on details and marshaling evidence and arguments, I can neglect the emotional resonance in situations, as though I’ve forgotten or don't care that a child who was loved has died ... I should have done better."

In a CNN op-ed, the attorney Raul A. Reyes wrote, "Much of what we know so far is unacceptable... There has been a disproportionate focus on the circumstances surrounding the shooting, rather than on the fact that a police officer killed an unarmed child. Sadly, this kind of violence is familiar to Latino communities – and that should disturb all Americans."

=== Public officials ===
Avatar of Julian Castro

Julian Castro
(@JulianCastro)
tweeted:

Chicago PD shot Adam Toledo with his hands in the air instantaneously after ordering him to do so—then lied about it. They executed Adam, a boy who was not yet in high school. Indict this officer, then pass a national use of force standard immediately.

Apr 15, 2021

Congressman Joaquin Castro wrote on Twitter, "Adam Toledo was 13-years-old. He complied and had his hands up. Chicago police killed him with a shot to the chest and then lied that he posed an imminent threat. The Toledo family deserves justice and accountability." His brother, former-Secretary Julian Castro, wrote, "Chicago PD shot Adam Toledo with his hands in the air instantaneously after ordering him to do so—then lied about it. They executed Adam, a boy who was not yet in high school. Indict this officer, then pass a national use of force standard immediately."

Former-U.S. Secretary of Labor Robert Reich wrote, "Sean Hannity called Adam Toledo a '13-year-old man'. On Hannity's show, Pam Bondi called Kyle Rittenhouse a 'little boy'. This tells you everything you need to know about the state of white supremacy in this country."

Senator Elizabeth Warren wrote on Twitter, "My heart goes out to the loved ones of Adam Toledo and Daunte Wright and everyone who's reeling from these horrifying killings. We must reimagine our criminal justice system and root systemic racism out of every institution." Senate Majority Leader Chuck Schumer wrote, "Adam Toledo was just 13 years old. He was a child. This is heartbreaking. He deserves justice. His family deserves justice."

Lori Lightfoot, mayor of Chicago, made an emotional call for peace after a video of Toledo's death was released on April 15. Illinois state Rep. Edgar Gonzalez, whose district includes Little Village, stated on the capitol floor on April 16, "If you put your hands up, they shoot. If you put your hands down, they shoot. If you walk, you run, you hide, you sleep, you do exactly as they say, they still shoot. What are we supposed to do?"

Illinois Governor J. B. Pritzker held a press conference about Toledo's death, stating it was “abundantly clear that our entire system failed Adam,” and that authorities need to move to “investigate and adjudicate what happened that night in Little Village in the interest of justice and accountability.” On Twitter, Illinois senator Tammy Duckworth wrote, "If we're to truly be the Land of the Free, every single American must feel safe, must be able to live."

White House Press Secretary Jen Psaki stated in a press conference, "I will say for those of us who did watch that video, it is certainly chilling. And a reminder that across the country there are far too many communities where there is violence that is impacting... that too often in this country law enforcement uses unnecessary force, too often resulting in the death of Black and brown Americans.”

=== Public figures and institutions ===
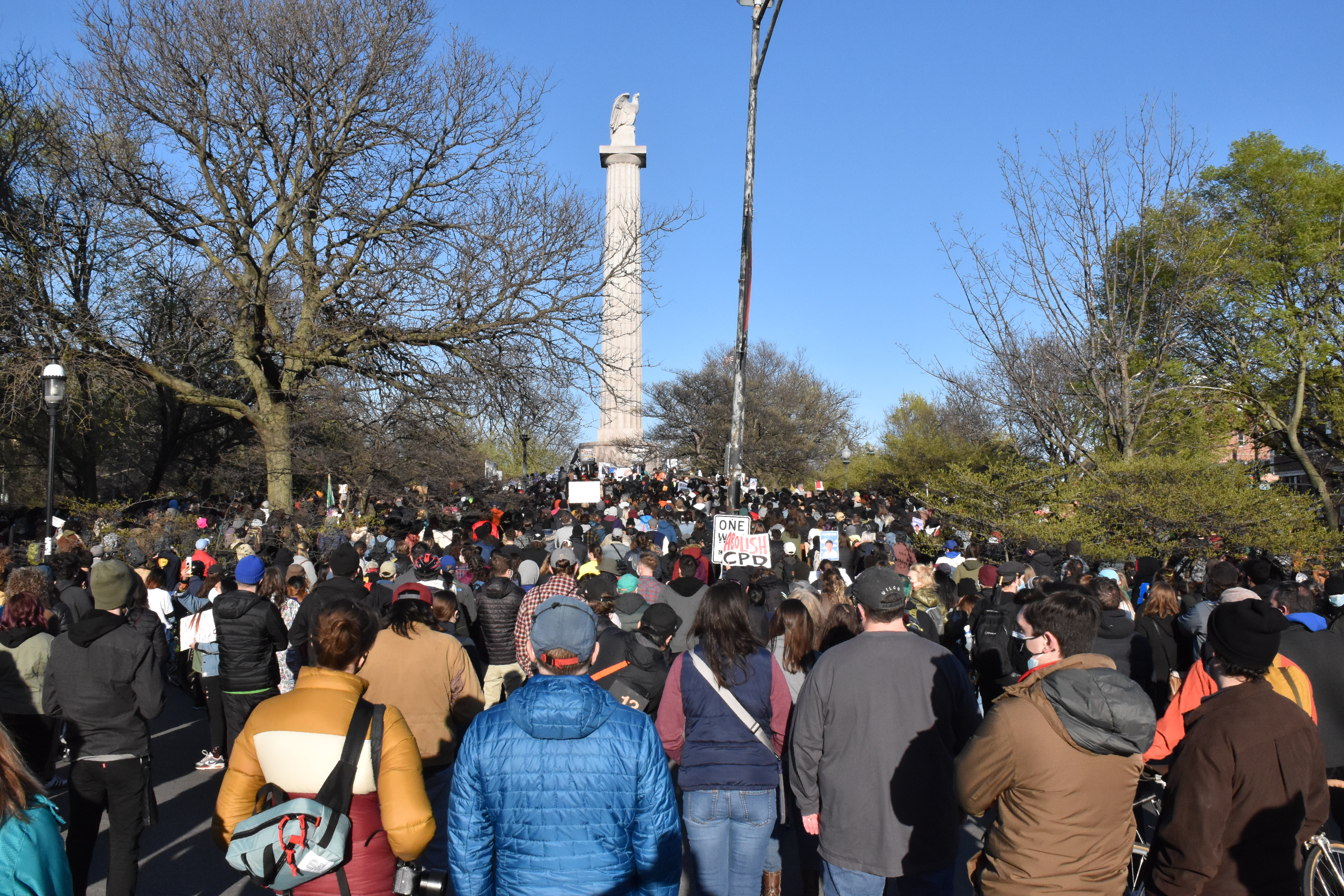
Protesters gather in Logan Square, the day after footage is released.

Domingo García, the president of LULAC, stated, “Words promising disciplinary action or possible court justice are not sufficient. Fire this officer now and make it clear that it is not open season on Latinos! This is a bad cop who acted out of anger and wanted to get even while Adam, barely a teenager, turned around and was trying to obey the officer's orders to show his hands. The video shows an execution, nothing less. LULAC demands accountability and anything short of that is unacceptable.”

Referring to controversy surrounding Chicago's foot pursuit policy, the American Civil Liberties Union released a statement saying, "The anger and frustration expressed by many in viewing the video is understandable and cannot be ignored. Now is a moment to truly embrace impacted communities in a critical discussion about needed changes to policing – including the adoption of a long-overdue foot chase policy that emerges from true, face-to-face community dialogue."

Access Living, a disability rights organization in Chicago, released a statement, saying, "We continue to see the lives of people of color being the target of our criminal system. A high proportion of people involved... with law enforcement are people of color; of these, many are also disabled. Adam's young life was another example of how we must continue to push for change and transparency within the systems that are failing us. All students of color with disabilities like Adam, deserve safety and full support from our society."

=== Chicago Police Department ===
On April 1, 2021, the CPD alerted its officers that Latin Kings gang members were allegedly instructed to open fire at unmarked police cruisers to retaliate for the shooting of Toledo.

== Aftermath ==
=== Comparisons to other cases ===
Toledo's death was compared to the 2014 murder of 17-year-old Laquan McDonald by Chicago police officer Jason Van Dyke as McDonald was walking away from police during a foot pursuit. Others compared the shooting to the 2012 killing of 22-year-old Rekia Boyd, who was shot in the back of the head by off-duty Chicago Police Officer Dante Servin (Servin claimed he thought he saw a gun, though it turned out to have been a cellphone). Toledo's death was also compared to other police killings of Black and Latino children and youth in the United States, including 12-year-old Tamir Rice, 7-year-old Aiyana Stanley-Jones, 13-year-old Andy Lopez, and 18-year-old Andrés Guardado. Toledo's death lastly drew comparisons to the killing of Anthony Alvarez, a 22-year-old Latino man who was killed in a foot pursuit by CPD two days after Toledo.

=== Impact on the Latino community ===
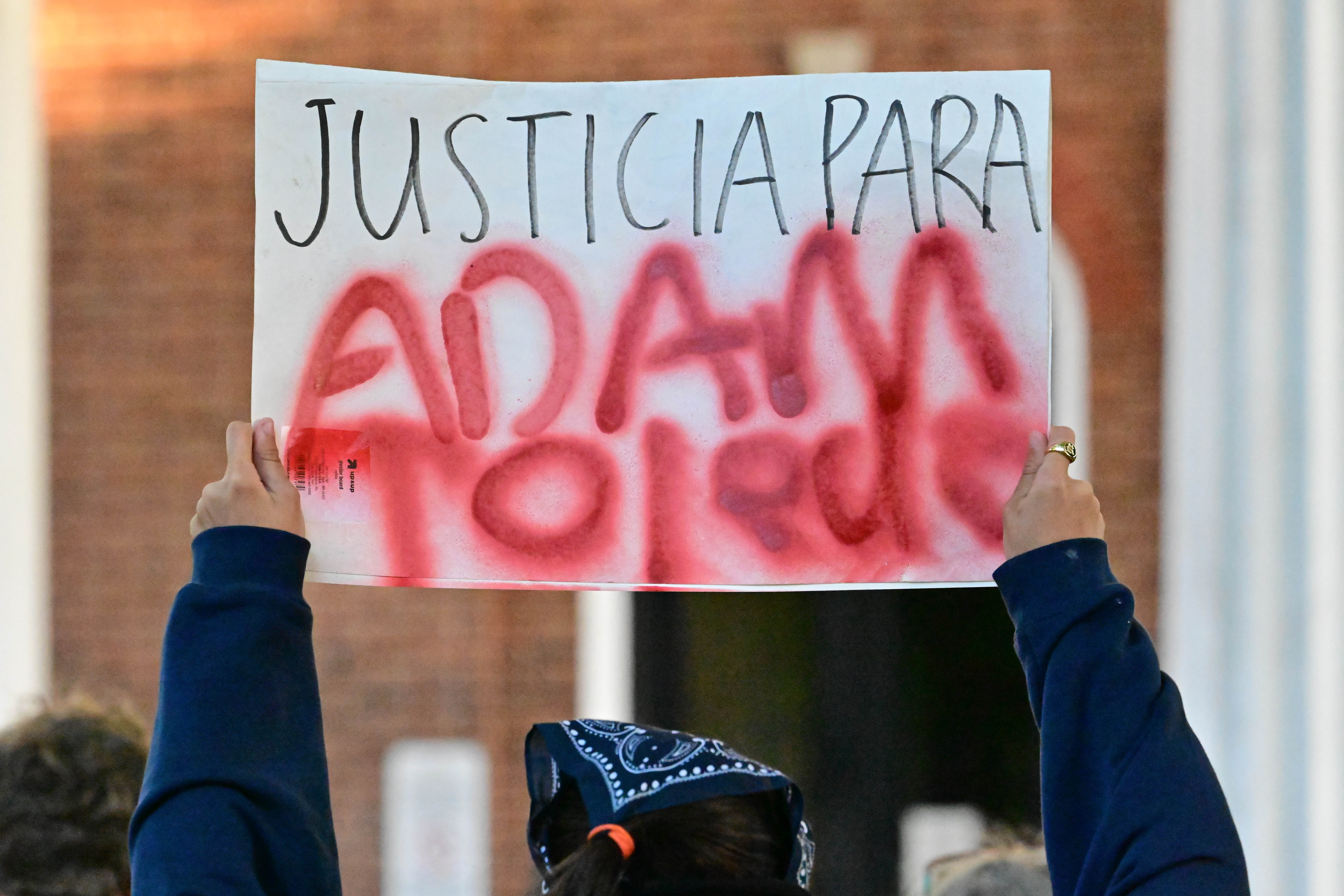
Sign reading "Justicia para Adam Toledo" in Hillsborough, North Carolina

Toledo's death sparked discussion within the Latino community about police brutality, a major yet under-discussed issue affecting U.S. Latino communities. According to Roberto Rodríguez, a professor of Mexican-American studies at the University of Arizona, many people in the Latino community still saw police violence as an African American issue, stating, "It's like, when you think about Latinos, it's immigration, and if we’re gonna talk about police brutality, law enforcement abuse, we’re talking about the African-American community". Patrisia Macias-Rojas, a professor at the University of Illinois at Chicago further stated, “there's a real opportunity here to link up what's been happening in Latino communities around immigration and the criminalization of youth with what's happening around Black Lives Matter.”

==== Little Village ====
In Toledo's hometown of Little Village, some noted a generational divide between older and younger Latinos in their attitudes toward police in response to the shooting. In an interview with the Chicago Tribune, Doris Hernandez, a mother who lost her son to violence in 2012, said many older Latino immigrants and refugees in Little Village "come from rural towns with strong conservative values that are reflected in their opinions about religion and policing." In the same interview, Hernandez commended younger Latinos for trying to change the narrative for their parents and elders. According to Dolores Castañeda, a community organizer in Little Village, fears of intra-community violence sometimes led to a failure "to focus on the root causes of crime, such as a lack of investment in the community, discriminatory policing and police brutality." Others also noted the complexity of the issues facing the Latino community surrounding immigration status and language, in addition to stressors related to police brutality and poverty. Some in the community also expressed fears the CPD had stopped responding to calls in the neighborhood in retaliation for protests against Toledo's shooting; one resident stated, "The police used to take a while before they showed up when people called them for anything. Now they won't show up at all."

=== Reform proposals ===
After the release of the video, Illinois state Rep. La Shawn Ford, the co-sponsor of a bill titled the Law Enforcement Accountability Act of 2021, called for a revamp of foot chase policies and the end of qualified immunity. Some community organizers in Chicago, meanwhile, called to "defund the police and invest in our communities.”

Students in the Chicago School District called for the removal of armed officers from public schools. One student stated, “After I saw what happened to Adam, it made me feel more strongly. It makes you kind of nervous to be in school. It makes you think whether you should go to school."

==== Foot pursuits ====
Toledo's death led to a call from the mayor's office for a review of Chicago's foot pursuit practices. Lightfoot and Chicago Police Superintendent David Brown said that changes to the city's foot-pursuit policy would be in place by the end of the summer of 2021.

In response to these proposed policy changes, Latino community activists called for an immediate moratorium on foot pursuits in Chicago, the development of procedures outlining when an officer can engage in a chase, when lethal force may be used, and what disciplinary action should be taken for violations.

==== Consent decree ====
At the time of the shooting, the CPD was operating under a court-ordered consent decree, which required the city to implement hundreds of reforms to its policing practices. Because consent decrees are monitored by the U.S. Department of Justice, a group of Latino law associations called on the DOJ to open an investigation into Toledo's death, with a focus on three potential areas of reform: establish clear procedures about foot pursuits, develop oversight on how officers interact with children, and establish policies on how officers engage in car chases in densely populated neighborhoods. A federal investigation was never opened.

==== Police video ====
In response to the wide circulation of Stillman's body camera footage, the American journalist Allissa Richardson called for an amendment to the Broadcast Decency Enforcement Act of 2005 to ban such video from being circulated on television and online without the victim's family consent. Richardson wrote, "I now believe that circulating videos of Black and brown death at the hands of police reinforces white supremacy. It does not deter it. These videos are no longer exposing a corrupt police system. They are a reminder of a social hierarchy that privileges police with qualified immunity, rewards racist vigilantes with internet fame and money, and punishes communities of color with death if they question that order."

== See also ==
- List of homicides in Illinois
- Killing of Anthony Alvarez
- Lists of killings by law enforcement officers in the United States
- Police violence against Mexican Americans
