= César Gonzales (Peruvian footballer) =

Peruvian footballer and manager (born 1956)

Personal information
- Full name: César Carlos Gonzales Hurtado
- Date of birth: 17 July 1956 (age 70)
- Place of birth: Lima, Peru
- Position: Defender

Senior career*
Years	Team	Apps	(Gls)
1977–1981	Alianza Lima		
1982–1983	Sporting Cristal		

Managerial career
- 1990–1991: Peru U20
- 1993–1994: Sport Boys
- 1994: Sport Boys
- 1995: Sport Boys
- 1996: Guardia Republicana
- 1998: Sport Boys
- 1999: Sport Boys
- 2001: Sport Boys
- 2001: Peru U17
- 2003: Peru U20
- 2003: Estudiantes de Medicina
- 2005: Unión Huaral
- 2006–2007: Sport Boys
- 2008: Deportivo Municipal
- 2009: La Peña Sporting
- 2009–2010: CNI
- 2010: Sport Victoria
- 2011: UTC
- 2012: Alfonso Ugarte (Puno)
- 2013: Pacífico FC
- * Club domestic league appearances and goals

César Carlos "Chalaca" Gonzales (born 17 July 1956) is a Peruvian football coach and former player.

== Playing career ==
A former central defender, he is known for his bicycle kicks, and for them received the nickname "Chalaca", which is the Peruvian Spanish term for the bicycle kick. Gonzales retired from playing at the age 27, having played for Alianza Lima and Sporting Cristal.

== Managerial career ==
Chalaca Gonzales has extensive experience as a youth coach. As the coach of Peru's U17 and U20 national teams, he is one of the founders of Academia Cantolao, a renowned institution in Peru for discovering and developing young talent.

However, his name remains most closely associated with Sport Boys of Callao, which he managed on several occasions in the 1990s and with which he came close to winning the Peruvian championship in 1998.

In 2012, he reached the Copa Perú final with Alfonso Ugarte de Puno, but his team lost to UTC in two sets (0–2 and 3–2).

== Honours ==
=== Player ===
Alianza Lima

- Torneo Descentralizado: 1977, 1978

Sporting Cristal

- Torneo Descentralizado: 1983

=== Manager ===
Peru U20

- South American Games: 1990

Peru U17

- Bolivarian Games: 2001
