= 2026 Maurice Revello Tournament =

52ème Festival International "Espoirs" – Tournoi Maurice Revello (in French)

Tournament details
- Host country: France
- Dates: 31 May – 13 June 2026
- Teams: 10 (from 5 confederations)
- Venues: 3 (in 3 host cities)

Final positions
- Champions: Portugal (4th title)
- Runners-up: Tunisia
- Third place: Ivory Coast
- Fourth place: DR Congo

Tournament statistics
- Matches played: 22
- Goals scored: 68 (3.09 per match)
- Top scorer: (Portugal) João Rego (5 goals)
- Best player: (Portugal) João Rego
- Best goalkeeper: (Tunisia) Anas Khardani

The 2026 Maurice Revello Tournament (officially French: 52ème Festival International "Espoirs" – Tournoi Maurice Revello), was the 52nd edition of the Maurice Revello Tournament, an annual, international, age-restricted football tournament. The previous champions, France, were not invited to defend their title.

Portugal won their fourth title after defeating Tunisia 2–0 in the final.

== Participants ==
Ten participating teams were announced on 2 April 2026.

AFC

- China
- Japan
- Saudi Arabia

CAF

- Ivory Coast
- DR Congo
- Tunisia

CONCACAF

- Canada

CONMEBOL

- Colombia
- Venezuela

UEFA

- Portugal

== Venues ==
A total of three cities host the tournament.

Avignon	Aubagne	Toulon
Parc des Sports	Stade de Lattre-de-Tassigny	Stade Bon Rencontre
43.929655°N 4.843322°E	43.2939695°N 5.5623227°E	43.1257°N 5.9304°E
Capacity: 17,518	Capacity: 1,000	Capacity: 8,200

== Group stage ==
The ten teams were drawn into two groups of five.

=== Group A ===
Pos	Team	Pld	W	D	L	GF	GA	GD	Pts	Qualification
1	Tunisia	4	2	1	1	7	3	+4	7	Advance to final
2	DR Congo	4	2	1	1	7	5	+2	7	Advance to third place playoff
3	Saudi Arabia	4	2	0	2	8	7	+1	6	
4	China	4	2	0	2	2	6	−4	6	
5	Colombia	4	0	2	2	5	8	−3	2	

Source: Maurice Revello Tournament

All times are local CEST

31 May 2026
15:00

China	1–0	Saudi Arabia
Dahal 12' (o.g.)	Report

Parc des Sports, Avignon
Referee: Natálie Čampišová (Czech Republic)
31 May 2026
18:30

DR Congo	0–3	Tunisia
	Report	Ben Ali 26' (pen.), 64'; Brik 45'

Parc des Sports, Avignon
Referee: Daichi Shiino (Japan)

2 June 2026
15:00

China	0–3	DR Congo
	Report	Bayanginisa 58'; Makala 62'; Balumene 83'

Stade de Lattre-de-Tassigny, Aubagne
Referee: Natálie Čampišová (Czech Republic)
2 June 2026
18:30

Saudi Arabia	5–3	Colombia
Al-Ghumayl 1', 90+8'; Haqawi 23'; Haroun 35'; Housa 48'	Report	Pajaro 31'; Palacios 45'; Solarte 62'

Stade de Lattre-de-Tassigny, Aubagne
Referee: Aaron O'Dowd (Ireland)

5 June 2026
15:00

Colombia	0–1	China
	Report	Liu 1'

Parc des Sports, Avignon
Referee: Florian Exner (Germany)
5 June 2026
18:30

Saudi Arabia	3–1	Tunisia
Al-Ghumayl 20'; Housa 78'; Meherzi 83' (o.g.)	Report	Ben Ali 12'

Parc des Sports, Avignon
Referee: Aaron O'Dowd (Ireland)

7 June 2026
15:00

DR Congo	2–2	Colombia
Kabwit 34'; Ahoka 46'	Report	Arrechea 66'; García 90+4'

Stade de Lattre-de-Tassigny, Aubagne
Referee: Daichi Shiino (Japan)
7 June 2026
18:30

China	0–3	Tunisia
	Report	Chtai-Telamio 13'; Dhouib 50'; Dhaou 90+2'

Stade de Lattre-de-Tassigny, Aubagne
Referee: Olivia Tschon (Austria)

10 June 2026
13:30

DR Congo	2–0	Saudi Arabia
Ahoka 27'; Kabwit 56'	Report

Stade Bon Rencontre, Toulon
Referee: Olivia Tschon (Austria)
10 June 2026
19:00

Colombia	0–0	Tunisia
	Report

Stade Bon Rencontre, Toulon
Referee: Daichi Shiino (Japan)

=== Group B ===
Pos	Team	Pld	W	D	L	GF	GA	GD	Pts	Qualification
1	Portugal	4	3	1	0	13	3	+10	10	Advance to final
2	Ivory Coast	4	2	2	0	8	5	+3	8	Advance to third place playoff
3	Japan	4	2	1	1	6	7	−1	7	
4	Canada	4	1	0	3	4	9	−5	3	
5	Venezuela	4	0	0	4	2	9	−7	0	

Source: Maurice Revello Tournament

All times are local CEST

1 June 2026
15:00

Japan	3–3	Ivory Coast
Asada 61', 62'; McGhee 81'	Report	Ta Bi 20'; Zabi 46'; Konaté 75'

Parc des Sports, Avignon
Referee: Gerard Cokaj (Albania)
1 June 2026
18:30

Venezuela	0–2	Canada
	Report	Guboglo 20'; Evans 43'

Parc des Sports, Avignon
Referee: Florian Exner (Germany)

3 June 2026
15:00

Japan	1–4	Portugal
Matsumoto 72'	Report	Rego 30', 45' (pen.); Nogueira 57'; Balde 60'

Stade de Lattre-de-Tassigny, Aubagne
Referee: Gerard Cokaj (Albania)
3 June 2026
18:30

Ivory Coast	3–1	Venezuela
Ta Bi 35'; Doue 84'; Kamagate 90+6'	Report	Diaz 70'

Stade de Lattre-de-Tassigny, Aubagne
Referee: Daichi Shiino (Japan)

6 June 2026
15:00

Japan	1–0	Canada
Yamashita 89'	Report

Parc des Sports, Avignon
Referee: Natálie Čampišová (Czech Republic)
6 June 2026
18:30

Portugal	0–0	Ivory Coast
	Report

Parc des Sports, Avignon
Referee: Gerard Cokaj (Albania)

8 June 2026
15:00

Ivory Coast	2–1	Canada
Ta Bi 14', 79'	Report	Graham-Roache 72'

Stade de Lattre-de-Tassigny, Aubagne
Referee: Bert Verbeke (Belgium)
8 June 2026
18:30

Venezuela	1–3	Portugal
Claut 8' (pen.)	Report	Sampaio 58'; Rego 68' (pen.); Gonçalves 90+1'

Stade de Lattre-de-Tassigny, Aubagne
Referee: Maika Vanderstichel (France)

11 June 2026
13:30

Venezuela	0–1	Japan
	Report	Asada 16'

Stade Bon Rencontre, Toulon
Referee: Bert Verbeke (Belgium)
11 June 2026
19:00

Portugal	6–1	Canada
Rego 9', 13'; De Carvalho 12'; Couto 55'; Andrade 58', 75'	Report	Kozlovskiy 51'

Stade Bon Rencontre, Toulon
Referee: Maika Vanderstichel (France)

== Final stage ==
=== Third place playoff ===
13 June 2026
13:30

Ivory Coast	3–1	DR Congo
Konaté 17', 48'; Wola-Wetshay 55' (o.g.)	Report	Kakou 75' (o.g.)

Stade Bon Rencontre, Toulon
Referee: Maika Vanderstichel (France)

=== Final ===
13 June 2026
19:00

Portugal	2–0	Tunisia
Baldé 23'; Nel 90+6'	Report

Stade Bon Rencontre, Toulon
Referee: Bert Verbeke (Belgium)
