= Colombia national under-20 football team =

National association football team

Colombia under-20
- Nickname: Los Cafeteros (The Coffee Growers) La Tricolor (The Tricolors)
- Association: Federación Colombiana de Fútbol (FCF)
- Confederation: CONMEBOL (South America)
- Head coach: César Torres
- FIFA code: COL
First colours	Second colours

First international
- Colombia 1–1 Uruguay (Caracas, Venezuela; 22 March 1954)

Biggest win
- Colombia 7–0 Netherlands Antilles (Cartagena, Colombia; 16 July 2006)

Biggest defeat
- Brazil 6–0 Colombia (Tbilisi, Soviet Union; 1 September 1985)

FIFA U-20 World Cup
- Appearances: 12 (first in 1985)
- Best result: Third place (2003, 2025)

South American U-20 Championship
- Appearances: 29 (first in 1954)
- Best result: Champions: (1987, 2005, 2013)
Medal record
Bolivarian Games
Silver medal – second place	1985 Ecuador	Team
South American Games
Bronze medal – third place	1990 Lima	Team
Bronze medal – third place	2018 Cochabamba	Team
Central American and Caribbean Games
Gold medal – first place	2006 Cartagena	Team
Gold medal – first place	2018 Barranquilla	Team

The Colombia national under-20 football team represents Colombia in international men's football at under-20 level and is overseen by the Colombian Football Federation (FCF). It contests the FIFA U-20 World Cup, the South American U-20 Championship and invitational and multi-sport tournaments such as the Maurice Revello Tournament and the regional games; because the age limits of some of those events differ, the federation has also entered under-19 squads, as it did at the 2026 Maurice Revello Tournament.

Colombia has qualified for the FIFA U-20 World Cup 12 times, first in 1985. The team finished third at the 2003 tournament in the United Arab Emirates and again at the 2025 tournament in Chile, and also reached the quarter-finals in 1985, 1989, 2011 (as hosts), 2019 and 2023. In South America, Colombia has won the U-20 championship three times: 1987 and 2005, both as hosts, and 2013 in Argentina, the only title won away from home.

Colombia has also won the Maurice Revello Tournament, known until 2020 as the Toulon Tournament, three times: in 1999, 2000 and 2011. The team also won the football tournament at the 2006 and 2018 Central American and Caribbean Games. The team has been coached since 2025 by César Torres, who led it to the bronze medal in Chile.

== History ==
=== Early years (1954–1984) ===
Colombia contested the first South American Youth Championship, held in Caracas in 1954, and took part in most editions thereafter; the tournament doubled as the qualifying route to the FIFA World Youth Championship from that competition's creation in 1977. The team's first podium finish came in 1964, when it finished third as host, but Colombia missed each of the first four World Youth Championships.

=== First World Youth Championships (1985–1993) ===
Colombia reached a World Youth Championship for the first time in 1985, coached by Luis Alfonso Marroquín, after finishing third at the South American qualifier in Paraguay. In the Soviet Union the team drew with Bulgaria and Hungary, beat Tunisia 2–1 with goals by John Edison Castaño and John Jairo Tréllez, and reached the quarter-finals, where Brazil, the eventual champions, won 6–0, still Colombia's heaviest defeat.

Colombia won its first continental title in 1987, hosting the South American championship in Armenia, Manizales and Pereira under José Finot Castaño, with players such as Miguel Guerrero, Wílmer Cabrera and Wilson Pérez. At the 1987 World Youth Championship in Chile the team beat Bahrain 1–0, lost to East Germany and drew its third match, and went out in the first round. A runners-up finish at the 1988 South American championship in Argentina qualified Colombia for the 1989 edition in Saudi Arabia, where it beat Syria 2–0, lost to Costa Rica and the Soviet Union, and as second in its group lost 1–0 to Portugal, the eventual champions, in the quarter-finals. The squad included Óscar Córdoba, Miguel Calero, Jorge Bermúdez and Iván Valenciano, all of whom went on to play for the senior team.

Colombia qualified for the 1993 tournament in Australia under Carlos Restrepo, but Reinaldo Rueda took charge for the finals, where the team beat Cameroon but lost to Russia and the hosts and did not advance from the group; Henry Zambrano was the tournament's top scorer with three goals.

=== Rueda and the 2003 bronze medal (2003–2009) ===
After a ten-year absence, Colombia returned to the World Youth Championship in 2003, coached by Rueda and led on the pitch by Fredy Guarín and Abel Aguilar. In the United Arab Emirates the team came through a group with Egypt, Japan and England, beat the Republic of Ireland 3–2 on a golden goal in the round of 16, and beat the hosts 1–0 in the quarter-finals. Spain, with Andrés Iniesta, won the semi-final 1–0, and Colombia took the bronze medal by beating Argentina 2–1 in the third-place match, the team's best result until 2025.

Colombia hosted the 2005 South American U-20 Championship, again in Armenia, Manizales and Pereira, and won it under Eduardo Lara, who succeeded Rueda when the latter was promoted to the senior team; the side included Radamel Falcao, Fredy Guarín, Hugo Rodallega, Juan Camilo Zúñiga, Dayro Moreno, Cristián Zapata and Abel Aguilar. At the 2005 World Youth Championship in the Netherlands Colombia won its group with a perfect record, but lost 2–1 to Argentina, featuring Lionel Messi and the eventual champions, in the round of 16. Colombia then missed the 2007 and 2009 tournaments.

=== Home World Cup and Restrepo's title (2011–2017) ===
As hosts of the 2011 FIFA U-20 World Cup, Colombia qualified automatically and, under Lara, won all three group matches, including a 4–1 win over France in which Luis Muriel scored twice. A 3–2 win over Costa Rica in the round of 16, with goals from Muriel, Pedro Franco and James Rodríguez, was followed by a 3–1 defeat to Mexico in the quarter-finals at El Campín on 13 August, a game Mexico took after a first-half penalty. The same squad, won the 2011 Toulon Tournament.

Carlos Restrepo coached the team to its third South American title in Argentina in 2013, where Colombia won the final round with 12 points, finishing with a 2–1 win over Paraguay on 3 February; Juan Fernando Quintero scored five goals. At the 2013 FIFA U-20 World Cup in Turkey Colombia won its group unbeaten, and Quintero scored three goals, but the team lost a round-of-16 penalty shoot-out 8–7 to South Korea after a 1–1 draw.

A second-place finish at the 2015 South American championship in Uruguay took Colombia to the 2015 FIFA U-20 World Cup and to the 2016 Olympic football tournament, its first Olympic qualification in 24 years. In New Zealand the team, which included Álvaro Montero, Davinson Sánchez and Rafael Santos Borré, beat Qatar 1–0, drew with Senegal and lost to Portugal 3–1, then lost 1–0 to the United States in the round of 16. Restrepo left in February 2017 after 49 matches in charge, of which 22 were wins, and Colombia finished sixth at the 2017 South American championship and missed that year's World Cup.

=== Quarter-finals in 2019 and 2023 ===
Under Arturo Reyes, Colombia finished fourth at the 2019 South American championship in Chile and qualified for the World Cup in Poland, where the squad of Kevin Mier, Carlos Cuesta, Johan Carbonero, Luis Sinisterra and Cucho Hernández beat Poland and Tahiti in its group. Colombia beat New Zealand on penalties in the round of 16 and lost 1–0 in the quarter-finals to Ukraine, who went on to win the title. As hosts of the 2023 South American championship, Colombia finished third and qualified for the 2023 World Cup in Argentina, where, coached by Héctor Cárdenas, it beat Slovakia 5–1 in the round of 16 and lost 3–1 to Italy in the quarter-finals.

=== Torres and the 2025 bronze medal (2025–present) ===
Coached by César Torres, Colombia finished third at the 2025 South American U-20 Championship in Venezuela, which qualified the team for the 2025 World Cup in Chile. In Talca, Óscar Perea scored the only goal of a 1–0 win over Saudi Arabia in the opening match, and after draws with Norway and Nigeria, Colombia won Group F, ahead of Norway on the fair-play tiebreaker. Néiser Villarreal scored twice in a 3–1 win over South Africa in the round of 16 and a hat-trick in a 3–2 quarter-final win over Spain, and Argentina then won the semi-final 1–0. Perea's goal after two minutes beat France 1–0 in the third-place match on 18 October, and Colombia's second bronze medal came 22 years after the first. Villarreal finished with five goals, level with two others, but lost the Golden Boot on the assists tiebreaker.

Colombia's 2026 youth tournaments, contested with under-19 squads, were less successful. The team finished bottom of its group at the 2026 Maurice Revello Tournament, with two draws and two defeats, and finished fourth in the football tournament at the 2026 Central American and Caribbean Games in Santo Domingo, losing the semi-final 1–0 to Venezuela and the bronze-medal match to Panama on penalties. In September the team ended its South American Games campaign in Rosario with a 3–2 defeat to Chile, a match in which Alam García and Miguel Marulanda scored after Colombia trailed by two goals.

== Competitive record ==
*Draws include knockout matches decided on penalty kicks. **Gold background colour indicates that the tournament was won. ***Red border colour indicates tournament was held on home soil.

Champions Runners-up Third place Fourth place

=== FIFA U-20 World Cup ===
Year	Round	Position	Pld	W	D*	L	GF	GA
(Tunisia) 1977	Did not qualify							
(Japan) 1979	Did not qualify							
(Australia) 1981	Did not qualify							
(Mexico) 1983	Did not qualify							
(Soviet Union) 1985	Quarter-finals	8th	4	1	2	1	5	10
(Chile) 1987	First round	9th	3	1	1	1	4	5
(Saudi Arabia) 1989	Quarter-finals	8th	4	1	0	3	3	5
(Portugal) 1991	Did not qualify							
(Australia) 1993	First round	12th	3	1	0	2	5	7
(Qatar) 1995	Did not qualify							
(Malaysia) 1997	Did not qualify							
(Nigeria) 1999	Did not qualify							
(Argentina) 2001	Did not qualify							
(United Arab Emirates) 2003	Third place	3rd	7	4	2	1	10	5
(Netherlands) 2005	Round of 16	9th	4	3	0	1	7	2
(Canada) 2007	Did not qualify							
(Egypt) 2009	Did not qualify							
(Colombia) 2011	Quarter-finals	5th	5	4	0	1	11	6
(Turkey) 2013	Round of 16	9th	4	2	2	0	6	2
(New Zealand) 2015	Round of 16	15th	4	1	1	2	3	5
(South Korea) 2017	Did not qualify							
(Poland) 2019	Quarter-finals	7th	5	2	1	2	9	4
(Indonesia) 2021	Cancelled							
(Argentina) 2023	Quarter-finals	6th	5	3	1	1	11	7
(Chile) 2025	Third place	3rd	7	4	2	1	9	5
(Azerbaijan) (Uzbekistan) 2027	To be determined							
(Armenia) (Georgia (country)) 2029	To be determined							
Total	Third place	12/26	55	27	12	16	83	63

=== South American U-20 Championship ===
Year	Round	Position	Pld	W	D*	L	GF	GA
(Venezuela) 1954	First round	5th	3	1	2	0	3	2
(Chile) 1958	Did not enter							
(Colombia) 1964	Third place	3rd	6	2	3	1	6	5
(Paraguay) 1967	First round	6th	4	1	2	1	5	5
(Paraguay) 1971	First round	8th	4	0	1	3	2	10
(Chile) 1974	First round	8th	4	1	0	3	4	12
(Peru) 1975	Did not enter							
(Venezuela) 1977	First round	7th	3	1	0	2	2	5
(Uruguay) 1979	First round	6th	4	2	0	2	7	10
(Ecuador) 1981	First round	8th	4	0	2	2	3	8
(Bolivia) 1983	First round	8th	4	1	0	3	5	9
(Paraguay) 1985	Third place	3rd	7	3	3	1	12	6
(Colombia) 1987	Champions	1st	7	4	1	2	11	2
(Argentina) 1988	Runners-up	2nd	7	4	2	1	9	3
(Venezuela) 1991	First round	7th	4	1	1	2	5	10
(Colombia) 1992	Third place	3rd	6	2	3	1	4	2
(Bolivia) 1995	First round	6th	3	1	1	1	4	4
(Chile) 1997	First round	7th	4	1	2	1	6	8
(Argentina) 1999	First round	8th	4	1	0	3	4	8
(Ecuador) 2001	Sixth place	6th	9	3	1	5	6	13
(Uruguay) 2003	Fourth place	4th	9	5	1	3	16	10
(Colombia) 2005	Champions	1st	9	7	2	0	20	6
(Paraguay) 2007	Sixth place	6th	9	3	1	5	7	15
(Venezuela) 2009	Fifth place	5th	9	3	3	3	10	10
(Peru) 2011	Sixth place	6th	9	1	3	5	8	16
(Argentina) 2013	Champions	1st	9	6	0	3	16	8
(Uruguay) 2015	Runners-up	2nd	9	4	3	2	12	5
(Ecuador) 2017	Sixth place	6th	9	2	3	4	8	11
(Chile) 2019	Fourth place	4th	9	4	3	2	4	3
(Colombia) 2023	Third place	3rd	9	5	3	1	11	5
(Venezuela) 2025	Third place	3rd	9	6	1	2	16	7
Total	3 titles	29/31	186	75	47	64	226	218

== Managers ==
The following coaches have led Colombia at the FIFA U-20 World Cup.

Tournament	Manager	Result
1985	Luis Alfonso Marroquín	Quarter-finals
1987	José Finot Castaño	First round
1993	Reinaldo Rueda	First round
2003	Reinaldo Rueda	Third place
2005	Eduardo Lara	Round of 16
2011	Eduardo Lara	Quarter-finals
2013	Carlos Restrepo	Round of 16
2015	Carlos Restrepo	Round of 16
2019	Arturo Reyes	Quarter-finals
2023	Héctor Cárdenas	Quarter-finals
2025	César Torres	Third place

== Players ==
=== Recent squad ===
The following players were called up for the 2026 Maurice Revello Tournament, played from 31 May to 13 June 2026.

No.	Pos.	Player	Date of birth (age)	Club
1	GK	Juan Covilla	21 September 2008 (aged 17)	(Colombian Football Federation) Deportes Tolima
2	DF	Antonio Simancas	12 April 2007 (aged 19)	(Colombian Football Federation) Alianza Valledupar
3	DF	Leandro Solarte	9 March 2007 (aged 19)	(Argentine Football Association) Racing Club
4	DF	Jhon Tenorio	17 August 2007 (aged 18)	(Colombian Football Federation) Independiente Santa Fe
5	DF	Carlos Pérez	7 September 2007 (aged 18)	(Colombian Football Federation) Junior
6	MF	Edmilson Herazo	19 September 2008 (aged 17)	(Colombian Football Federation) Barranquilla FC
7	FW	Duvan Mina Aponza	10 October 2008 (aged 17)	(Colombian Football Federation) América de Cali
8	MF	Juan David Aponza	24 May 2008 (aged 18)	(Colombian Football Federation) América de Cali
9	FW	Jesús Chinchia	3 March 2007 (aged 19)	(Colombian Football Federation) Atlético Nacional
10	MF	Juan Rosa	4 July 2007 (aged 18)	(Colombian Football Federation) Atlético Nacional
11	FW	Cristian Uribe	7 October 2007 (aged 18)	(Colombian Football Federation) Atlético Nacional
12	GK	Matías Lozano	23 June 2007 (aged 18)	(Colombian Football Federation) Atlético Nacional
13	DF	Santiago Arrechea Cardenas	20 January 2007 (aged 19)	(Colombian Football Federation) Orsomarso
14	MF	Robinho Quinto	20 November 2007 (aged 18)	(Argentine Football Association) River Plate
15	DF	Jaidinson Córdoba	12 December 2007 (aged 18)	(Colombian Football Federation) Independiente Medellín
	FW	Geronimo Mancilla	29 December 2008 (aged 17)	(Colombian Football Federation) Independiente Medellín
16	MF	Matias Orozco	1 December 2007 (aged 18)	(Colombian Football Federation) Deportivo Cali
17	MF	Carlos Londoño	10 January 2007 (aged 19)	(Colombian Football Federation) Águilas Doradas
18	MF	Jimmy Martínez	20 March 2007 (aged 19)	(Colombian Football Federation) Independiente Santa Fe
19	FW	Alan García	8 August 2007 (aged 18)	(Colombian Football Federation) Independiente Yumbo
20	MF	Juan Palacios	10 October 2007 (aged 18)	(Colombian Football Federation) Independiente Yumbo
21	DF	Miguel Solarte	11 January 2008 (aged 18)	(Football Association of the Czech Republic) Slavia Prague
22	DF	Junior Mosquera	26 March 2007 (aged 19)	(Colombian Football Federation) Internacional de Palmira

== Results ==
Win Draw Loss

=== 2025 FIFA U-20 World Cup ===
29 September World Cup GS	Colombia	1–0	Saudi Arabia	Estadio Fiscal, Talca
20:00	Perea 64'	Report		Attendance: 6,482; Referee: Youcef Gamouh (Algeria)

2 October World Cup GS	Colombia	0–0	Norway	Estadio Fiscal, Talca
17:00		Report		Attendance: 6,932; Referee: Katia Itzel García (Mexico)

5 October World Cup GS	Nigeria	1–1	Colombia	Estadio Fiscal, Talca
20:00	Bameyi 86' (pen.)	Report	González 51'	Attendance: 6,172; Referee: Nazmi Nasaruddin (Malaysia)

8 October World Cup R16	Colombia	3–1	South Africa	Estadio Fiscal, Talca
16:30	Canchimbo 7'; Villarreal 63', 90+6'	Report	Vilakazi 49' (pen.)	Attendance: 6,420; Referee: Khalid Al-Thurais (Saudi Arabia)

11 October World Cup QF	Spain	2–3	Colombia	Estadio Fiscal, Talca
17:00	Belaid 56'; Virgili 59'	Report	Villarreal 38', 64', 89'	Attendance: 10,326; Referee: Joe Dickerson (United States)

15 October World Cup SF	Argentina	1–0	Colombia	Estadio Nacional Julio Martínez Prádanos, Santiago
20:00	Silvetti 72'	Report		Attendance: 41,354; Referee: João Pinheiro (Portugal)

18 October World Cup TPP	Colombia	1–0	France	Estadio Nacional Julio Martínez Prádanos, Santiago
16:00	Perea 2'	Report		Attendance: 21,053; Referee: Omar Artan (Somalia)

=== 2026 Maurice Revello Tournament ===
2 June Maurice Revello Tournament	Saudi Arabia	5–3	Colombia	Stade de Lattre-de-Tassigny, Aubagne
18:30	Al-Ghumayl 1', 90+8'; Haqawi 23'; Haroun 35'; Housa 48'	Report	Pajaro 31'; Palacios 45'; Solarte 62'	Referee: Aaron O'Dowd (Ireland)

5 June Maurice Revello Tournament	Colombia	0–1	China	Parc des Sports, Avignon
15:00		Report	Liu 1'	Referee: Florian Exner (Germany)

7 June Maurice Revello Tournament	DR Congo	2–2	Colombia	Stade de Lattre-de-Tassigny, Aubagne
15:00	Kabwit 34'; Ahoka 46'	Report	Arrechea 66'; García 90+4'	Referee: Daichi Shiino (Japan)

10 June Maurice Revello Tournament	Colombia	0–0	Tunisia	Stade Bon Rencontre, Toulon
19:00		Report

=== Other recent matches ===
Date	Opponent	Score	Colombia scorers	Venue	Occasion
4 June 2025	Saudi Arabia	2–1	Amaya 88', Montaño 90'	Petrosport Stadium, New Cairo	Friendly
6 June 2025	South Korea	1–0	Montaño 90+1'	Petrosport Stadium, New Cairo	Friendly
8 June 2025	Iceland	3–1	Palacios 39', Perea 43', Amaya 65'	Petrosport Stadium, New Cairo	Friendly
10 June 2025	United States	0–1	–	Petrosport Stadium, New Cairo	Friendly
27 July 2025	Panama	0–0	–	Estadio Olímpico Pascual Guerrero, Cali	Friendly
30 July 2025	Panama	1–0	Aristizábal 79'	Estadio Olímpico Pascual Guerrero, Cali	Friendly
17 September 2025	Paraguay	1–1	Canchimbo 72'	Estadio CARFEM, Ypané	Friendly
23 September 2025	Mexico	3–2	Rentería 40', 52', Benítez 78'	Estadio CARFEM, Ypané	Friendly
26 May 2026	Costa Rica	1–0	García 19'	Sede Deportiva FCF, Barranquilla	Friendly
28 May 2026	Costa Rica	2–1	Aponzá 30', García 67'	Sede Deportiva FCF, Barranquilla	Friendly
5 August 2026	Venezuela	0–1	–	Santo Domingo, Dominican Republic	2026 Central American and Caribbean Games, semi-final
6 August 2026	Panama	(a.e.t.) (penalties lost)	–	Santo Domingo	2026 Central American and Caribbean Games, third-place match
20 September 2026	Chile	2–3	García 54', Marulanda 69'	Estadio Marcelo Bielsa, Rosario	2026 South American Games, group stage

== Head-to-head record ==
The following table shows Colombia's head-to-head record in the FIFA U-20 World Cup.

Opponent	Pld	W	D	L	GF	GA	GD	Win %
Argentina	3	1	0	2	3	4	−1	33.33
Australia	2	0	1	1	2	3	−1	0.00
Bahrain	1	1	0	0	1	0	+1	100.00
Brazil	1	0	0	1	0	6	−6	0.00
Bulgaria	1	0	1	0	1	1	+0	0.00
Cameroon	1	1	0	0	3	2	+1	100.00
Canada	1	1	0	0	2	0	+2	100.00
Costa Rica	2	1	0	1	3	3	+0	50.00
East Germany	1	0	0	1	1	3	−2	0.00
El Salvador	1	1	0	0	3	0	+3	100.00
Egypt	1	0	1	0	0	0	+0	0.00
England	1	0	1	0	0	0	+0	0.00
France	2	2	0	0	5	1	+4	100.00
Hungary	1	0	1	0	2	2	+0	0.00
Israel	1	1	0	0	2	1	+1	100.00
Italy	2	1	0	1	3	3	+0	50.00
Japan	2	2	0	0	6	2	+4	100.00
Mali	1	1	0	0	2	0	+2	100.00
Mexico	1	0	0	1	1	3	−2	0.00
New Zealand	1	0	1	0	1	1	+0	0.00
Nigeria	1	0	1	0	1	1	+0	0.00
Norway	1	0	1	0	0	0	+0	0.00
Poland	1	1	0	0	2	0	+2	100.00
Portugal	2	0	0	2	1	4	−3	0.00
Qatar	1	1	0	0	1	0	+1	100.00
Republic of Ireland	1	1	0	0	3	2	+1	100.00
Russia	1	0	0	1	1	3	−2	0.00
Saudi Arabia	1	1	0	0	1	0	+1	100.00
Scotland	1	0	1	0	2	2	+0	0.00
Senegal	3	0	2	1	2	4	−2	0.00
Slovakia	1	1	0	0	5	1	+4	100.00
South Africa	1	1	0	0	3	1	+2	100.00
South Korea	2	1	1	0	2	1	+1	50.00
Soviet Union	1	0	0	1	1	3	−2	0.00
Spain	2	1	0	1	3	3	+0	50.00
Syria	2	2	0	0	4	0	+4	100.00
Tahiti	1	1	0	0	6	0	+6	100.00
Tunisia	1	1	0	0	2	1	+1	100.00
Turkey	1	1	0	0	1	0	+1	100.00
Ukraine	1	0	0	1	0	1	−1	0.00
United Arab Emirates	1	1	0	0	1	0	+1	100.00
United States	1	0	0	1	0	1	−1	0.00
Total	55	27	12	16	83	63	+20	49.09

== Honours ==
- FIFA U-20 World Cup
  - Third place (2): 2003, 2025
- South American U-20 Championship
  - Winners (3): 1987, 2005, 2013
  - Runners-up (2): 1988, 2015
  - Third place (5): 1964, 1985, 1992, 2023, 2025
  - Fourth place (2): 2003, 2019
- Maurice Revello Tournament
  - Winners (3): 1999, 2000, 2011
  - Runners-up (2): 2001, 2013
  - Fourth place (1): 2022
- Bolivarian Games
  - Runners-up (1): 1985 Ecuador
- Central American and Caribbean Games
  - Winners (2): 2006 Cartagena, 2018 Barranquilla
- Pan American Games
  - Fourth place (1): 2003 Santo Domingo
- South American Games
  - Third place (3): 1990 Lima, 2018 Cochabamba, 2022 Asunción

== See also ==
- Colombia national football team
- Colombia national under-23 football team
- Colombia national under-17 football team
- Colombia national under-15 football team
- Colombia women's national under-20 football team
- Colombia national futsal team
