= Japan national under-20 football team =

National association football team

Japan Under-20
- Nickname(s): サムライ・ブルー (Samurai Blue)
- Association: JFA
- Confederation: AFC
- Sub-confederation: EAFF
- Head coach: Yuzo Funakoshi
- Most caps: Koki Ogawa (36)
- Top scorer: Koki Ogawa (23)
- FIFA code: JPN
First colours	Second colours

First international
- Japan 4–0 Singapore (Kuala Lumpur, Malaysia; 19 April 1959)

Biggest win
- Japan 26–0 Guam (Bangkok, Thailand; 31 October 2011)

Biggest defeat
- Malaysia 6–0 Japan (Kuala Lumpur, Malaysia; 22 April 1959)

FIFA U-20 World Cup
- Appearances: 12 (first in 1979)
- Best result: Runners-up (1999)

AFC U-20 Asian Cup
- Appearances: 39 (first in 1959)
- Best result: Champions (2016)

The Japan national under-20 football team (Japanese: U-20サッカー日本代表) is a national association football team of Japan and is controlled by the Japan Football Association. The year before the FIFA U-20 World Cup, the national team was renamed the Japan national under-19 football team, and the year before that, the national team was renamed the Japan national under-18 football team.

== Results and fixtures ==
Legend

Win Draw Lose Fixture

=== 2026 ===
==== U-19 ====
25 March Friendly	Uzbekistan	0–1	Japan	Tashkent, Uzbekistan
15:00 UTC+5		Report		Stadium: New Tashkent Stadium

30 March Friendly	Uzbekistan	1–1 (4–3 p)	Japan	Tashkent, Uzbekistan
14:00 UTC+5		Report		Stadium: New Tashkent Stadium

1 June 2026 Maurice Revello Tournament	Japan	3–3	Ivory Coast	Avignon, France
15:00 UTC+2	Asada 61', 62'; McGhee 81'	Report	Ta Bi 20'; Zabi 46'; Konaté 75'	Stadium: Parc des Sports; Referee: Gerard Cokaj (Albania)

3 June 2026 Maurice Revello Tournament	Japan	1–4	Portugal	Aubagne, France
15:00 UTC+2	Matsumoto 72'	Report	Rego 30', 45' (pen.); Nogueira 57'; Balde 60'	Stadium: Stade de Lattre-de-Tassigny; Referee: Gerard Cokaj (Albania)

5 June Friendly	Mexico	1–3	Japan	Veracruz, Mexico
20:00 UTC−6		Report		Stadium: Estadio Luis "Pirata" Fuente

6 June 2026 Maurice Revello Tournament	Japan	1–0	Canada	Avignon, France
15:00 UTC+2	Yamashita 89'	Report		Stadium: Parc des Sports; Referee: Natálie Čampišová (Czech Republic)

10 June Friendly	United States	5–2	Japan	Atlanta, USA
11:00 UTC−4		Report		Stadium: US Soccer National Training Center

11 June 2026 Maurice Revello Tournament	Venezuela	0–1	Japan	Toulon, France
13:30 UTC+2		Report	Asada 16'	Stadium: Stade Bon Rencontre; Referee: Bert Verbeke (Belgium)

31 August 2027 AFC U-20 Asian Cup qualification	Japan	4–0	Kuwait	Phnom Penh, Cambodia
	Fuji 15'; Hamasaki 35' (pen.); Tokuda 40', 42'	Report		Stadium: Olympic Stadium; Referee: Resul Mämmedow (Turkmenistan)

3 September 2027 AFC U-20 Asian Cup qualification	Cambodia	0–8	Japan	Phnom Penh, Cambodia
		Report	Schmidt 26'; Tokuda 44'; Kidera 68'; Tokumura 74'; Fujita 78'; Vattana 80' (o.g.); Osa 89'; Phan 90+3' (o.g.)	Stadium: Olympic Stadium; Referee: Hasan Akrami (Iran)

6 September 2027 AFC U-20 Asian Cup qualification	Japan	4–0	Yemen	Phnom Penh, Cambodia
16:00	Tokuda 10', 30'; Asada 27'; Tokumura 87'	Report		Stadium: Olympic Stadium; Referee: Resul Mämmedow (Turkmenistan)

30 September Friendly	Moldova	v	Japan	Gabala, Azerbaijan
16:00 UTC+4		Report		Stadium: Gabala City Stadium

6 October Friendly	Azerbaijan	v	Japan	Gabala, Azerbaijan
16:00 UTC+4		Report		Stadium: Gabala City Stadium

- Fixtures & Results (U-19 2026), JFA.jp

==== U-18 ====
12 March J-Village Cup U-18	Japan	2–0	(Japan) Nagoya Grampus	Hirono and Naraha, Japan
12:45 UTC+9		Report		Stadium: J-Village Stadium

13 March J-Village Cup	Japan	4–1	(Japan) Kashima Antlers	Hirono and Naraha, Japan
11:45 UTC+9		Report		Stadium: J-Village Stadium Pitch 3

14 March J-Village Cup	Japan	2–0	(Japan) Kamimura Gakuen HS	Hirono and Naraha, Japan
11:45 UTC+9		Report		Stadium: J-Village Stadium

15 March J-Village Cup	Japan	2–0	(Japan) U-17 High School Selection	Hirono and Naraha, Japan
09:30 UTC+9		Report		Stadium: J-Village Stadium

- Fixtures & Results (U-18 2026), JFA.jp

=== 2025 ===
==== U-18 ====
18 December 2025 SBS Cup	Shizuoka U-18 Selection (Japan)	0–3	Japan	Fujieda, Japan
18:30 UTC+9		Report		Stadium: Fujieda Soccer Stadium

20 December 2025 SBS Cup	Japan	2–4	Spain	Fujieda, Japan
13:30 UTC+9		Report		Stadium: Fujieda Soccer Stadium

21 December 2025 SBS Cup	Japan	2–0	Australia	Fujieda, Japan
11:00 UTC+9		Report		Stadium: Fujieda Soccer Stadium

- Fixtures & Results (U-18 2025), JFA.jp

== Coaching staff ==
=== Current staff ===
As of 24 September 2026.

Role	Name
Head coach	(Japan) Satoshi Yamaguchi
Assistant coaches	(Japan) Daisuke Sugawara (Japan) Michifumi Shiraishi
Goalkeeping coach	(Japan) Toshiyasu Takahara
Fitness coach	(Japan) Keisuke Otsuka
Technical staff	(Japan) Tomoki Takeuchi

== Players ==
=== Current U-19 squad - September and October ===
The following players were called up on 24 September 2026 for a friendly tour in Azerbaijan, facing Moldova and Azerbaijan.

No.	Pos.	Player	Date of birth (age)	Club
1	GK	Shun Matsuda	22 May 2007 (age 19)	(Japan Football Association) Fagiano Okayama
12	GK	Matthew Watanabe	24 April 2008 (age 18)	(Japan Football Association) FC Tokyo
3	DF	Harumu Kubo	18 June 2007 (age 19)	(Japan Football Association) Nagoya Grampus
4	DF	Haruto Nakano	6 May 2007 (age 19)	(Japan Football Association) Iwaki FC
5	DF	Yugo Okawa	14 July 2007 (age 19)	(Japan Football Association) Kashima Antlers
15	DF	Hideaki Matsumura	19 June 2008 (age 18)	(Japan Football Association) Shonan Bellmare
2	MF	Sora Masuda	13 January 2008 (age 18)	(Japan Football Association) Júbilo Iwata
6	MF	Haruto Nakano	30 November 2007 (age 18)	(Japan Football Association) University of Tsukuba
7	MF	Shimpei Ogura	20 February 2007 (age 19)	(Japan Football Association) Kyoto Sangyo University
8	MF	Yuta Sugawara	7 September 2007 (age 19)	(Japan Football Association) FC Tokyo
11	MF	Rea Ishizuka	17 December 2007 (age 18)	(Japan Football Association) Júbilo Iwata
13	MF	Daigo Hirashima	17 June 2008 (age 18)	(Japan Football Association) Kashima Antlers
16	MF	Matthew Edward	21 July 2008 (age 18)	(Japan Football Association) RB Omiya Ardija
18	MF	Ryu Nakamura	11 July 2008 (age 18)	(Japan Football Association) Shonan Bellmare
19	MF	Kanata Hirano	23 September 2008 (age 18)	(Japan Football Association) Yokohama F. Marinos
20	MF	Kaiji Chonan	7 April 2009 (age 17)	(Japan Football Association) Kashiwa Reysol
9	FW	Shion Shinkawa	6 August 2007 (age 19)	(Royal Belgian Football Association) Sint-Truiden
10	FW	Rento Takaoka	12 March 2007 (age 19)	(Royal Belgian Football Association) Patro Eisden
14	FW	Naru Nakatsumi	19 December 2007 (age 18)	(Japan Football Association) Gamba Osaka
17	FW	Minato Yoshida	15 July 2008 (age 18)	(Japan Football Association) Kashima Antlers

=== Current U-19 squad - August and September ===
The following players were called up on 20 August 2026 for the 2027 AFC U-20 Asian Cup qualification. Haruto Nakano and Makoto Himeno were replaced by Takezo Fujikawa and Noriharu Kan, sidelined due to injury.

No.	Pos.	Player	Date of birth (age)	Club
1	GK	Hiroaki Hagi	12 June 2007 (age 19)	(Japan Football Association) Nagoya Grampus
12	GK	Ethan Scally	8 June 2008 (age 18)	(United States Soccer Federation) Los Angeles FC
23	GK	Hiroto Matsuura	21 September 2008 (age 18)	(Japan Football Association) Albirex Niigata
2	DF	Katsuma Fuse	11 March 2007 (age 19)	(Japan Football Association) University of Tsukuba
3	DF	Shota Fujii	11 August 2008 (age 18)	(Japan Football Association) Yokohama F. Marinos
4	DF	Takezo Fujikawa	29 July 2008 (age 18)	(Japan Football Association) Avispa Fukuoka
5	DF	Reon Tanaka	1 February 2007 (age 19)	(Japan Football Association) Tokai University
22	DF	Asuto Fujita	2 November 2008 (age 18)	(Japan Football Association) Kawasaki Frontale
6	MF	Nick Schmidt	12 September 2007 (age 19)	(German Football Association) St. Pauli
7	MF	Kaito Konomi	27 February 2007 (age 19)	(Japan Football Association) Consadole Sapporo
8	MF	Tokumo Kawai	3 March 2007 (age 19)	(Japan Football Association) Júbilo Iwata
10	MF	Kento Hamasaki	16 June 2007 (age 19)	(Japan Football Association) Vissel Kobe
11	MF	Futa Tokumura	26 November 2007 (age 18)	(Japan Football Association) Machida Zelvia
14	MF	Noriharu Kan	11 April 2007 (age 19)	(Japan Football Association) Kawasaki Frontale
15	MF	Kaede Suzuki	5 June 2007 (age 19)	(Japan Football Association) FC Tokyo
16	MF	Shimon Kobayashi	23 January 2008 (age 18)	(Japan Football Association) Sanfrecce Hiroshima
17	MF	Ryuki Osa	13 October 2007 (age 19)	(Japan Football Association) Kawasaki Frontale
19	MF	Taiga Seguchi	10 January 2008 (age 18)	(Japan Football Association) Vissel Kobe
20	MF	Hiroto Ogawa	9 December 2008 (age 17)	(Japan Football Association) Kawasaki Frontale
21	MF	Sunao Kidera	12 September 2008 (age 18)	(Japan Football Association) RB Omiya Ardija
9	FW	Hiroto Asada	16 January 2008 (age 18)	(Japan Football Association) Yokohama F. Marinos
13	FW	Homare Tokuda	18 February 2007 (age 19)	(Japan Football Association) Kashima Antlers
18	FW	Jelani McGhee	24 December 2008 (age 17)	(Japan Football Association) RB Omiya Ardija

=== Current U-18 squad ===
The following players were called up on 9 March 2026 for the J-Village Cup. Ryu Nakamura and Sunao Kidera were replaced by Minato Hara and Asuto Fujita due to fitness issues.

No.	Pos.	Player	Date of birth (age)	Club
1	GK	Ibuki Vincent Jr. Ejike	31 December 2008 (age 17)	(Japan Football Association) Sagan Tosu
12	GK	Matthew Watanabe	24 April 2008 (age 18)	(Japan Football Association) FC Tokyo
3	DF	Simon Yu Mendy	29 November 2008 (age 17)	(Japan Football Association) RKU Kashiwa High School
4	DF	Harim Zeidam Oda	29 April 2008 (age 18)	(Japan Football Association) Kiryu Daiichi High School
5	DF	Shota Fujii	11 August 2008 (age 18)	(Japan Football Association) Yokohama F. Marinos
7	DF	Asuto Fujita	22 November 2008 (age 17)	(Japan Football Association) Kawasaki Frontale
13	DF	Takezo Fujikawa	29 July 2008 (age 18)	(Japan Football Association) Avispa Fukuoka
2	MF	Minato Hara	1 July 2008 (age 18)	(Japan Football Association) Sanfrecce Hiroshima
6	MF	Hiroto Ogawa	9 December 2008 (age 17)	(Japan Football Association) Kawasaki Frontale
8	MF	Taiga Seguchi	10 January 2008 (age 18)	(Japan Football Association) Vissel Kobe
10	MF	Shimon Kobayashi	23 January 2008 (age 18)	(Japan Football Association) Sanfrecce Hiroshima
15	MF	Matthew Edward	21 July 2008 (age 18)	(Japan Football Association) RB Omiya Ardija
16	MF	Sora Masuda	13 January 2008 (age 18)	(Japan Football Association) Júbilo Iwata
18	MF	Rui Onuki	9 April 2008 (age 18)	(Japan Football Association) Kashima Antlers
19	MF	Kanata Hirano	23 September 2008 (age 18)	(Japan Football Association) Yokohama F. Marinos
9	FW	Jelani McGhee	24 December 2008 (age 17)	(Japan Football Association) RB Omiya Ardija
11	FW	Hikaru Maeda	25 October 2008 (age 18)	(Japan Football Association) Avispa Fukuoka
14	FW	Takayuki Hiraoka	23 July 2008 (age 18)	(Japan Football Association) Hannan University High School
17	FW	Kaiki Kato	25 February 2008 (age 18)	(Japan Football Association) Yokohama F. Marinos
20	FW	Mibuki Kasai	12 February 2008 (age 18)	(Japan Football Association) Shonan Bellmare

=== Previous squads ===
FIFA U-20 World Cup

- 1979 FIFA World Youth Championship
- 1995 FIFA World Youth Championship
- 1997 FIFA World Youth Championship
- 1999 FIFA World Youth Championship
- 2001 FIFA World Youth Championship
- 2003 FIFA World Youth Championship
- 2005 FIFA World Youth Championship
- 2007 FIFA U-20 World Cup
- 2017 FIFA U-20 World Cup
- 2019 FIFA U-20 World Cup

== Records ==
As of 14 June 2023
Players in bold are still active, at least at club level.
Caps and goals is calculated by all national team level include U18, U19, and U20.

=== Most capped player ===
#	Name	Caps	Goals	Pos	Career
1	Koki Ogawa	36	23	FW	2015–2017
2	Yuta Nakayama	30	0	DF	2015–2017
3	Takehiro Tomiyasu	28	1	DF	2016–2017
4	Ryosuke Yamanaka	25	0	DF	2011–2012
5	Ritsu Doan	24	8	MF	2016–2017
6	Koji Miyoshi	23	5	MF	2013–2017
7	Isa Sakamoto	21	12	FW	2021–2023
8	Sota Kitano	19	6	FW	2022–2023
9	Yuya Kubo	18	15	FW	2010–2012
10	Naohiro Takahara	16	16	FW	1998–1999

=== Top goalscorers ===
#	Name	Goals	Caps	Ratio	Career
1	Koki Ogawa	23	36	0.64	2015–2017
2	Naohiro Takahara	16	16	1	1998–1999
3	Yuya Kubo	15	18	0.83	2010–2012
4	Isa Sakamoto	12	21	0.57	2021–2023
5	Kanta Chiba	11	4	2.75	2021–2022
6	**Kento Shiogai**	9	9	1	2023–
7	Ritsu Doan	8	24	0.33	2016–2017
7	Naoki Kumata	8	13	0.62	2022–2023
9	Sota Kitano	6	19	0.32	2022–2023
9	Hidetoshi Nakata	6	12	0.5	1994–1995
9	Taisei Miyashiro	6	11	0.55	2018–2020
9	Kensuke Nagai	6	11	0.55	2007–2011

== Honours ==
=== Intercontinental ===
- FIFA U-20 World Cup

Runners-Up (1): 1999

=== Continental ===
AFC U-19 Championship

- Winners (1): 2016

Runners-Up (6): 1973, 1994, 1998, 2000, 2002, 2006

== Competitive record ==
=== FIFA U-20 World Cup ===
Year	Result	Pld	W	D*	L	GS	GA
(Tunisia) 1977	Did not qualify						
(Japan) 1979	Group stage	3	0	2	1	1	2
(Australia) 1981	Did not qualify						
(Mexico) 1983	Did not qualify						
(Soviet Union) 1985	Did not qualify						
(Chile) 1987	Did not qualify						
(Saudi Arabia) 1989	Did not qualify						
(Portugal) 1991	Did not qualify						
(Australia) 1993	Did not qualify						
(Qatar) 1995	Quarter-finals	4	1	1	2	6	6
(Malaysia) 1997	Quarter-finals	5	2	1	2	12	9
(Nigeria) 1999	Runners-up	7	4	1	2	11	9
(Argentina) 2001	Group stage	3	1	0	2	4	4
(United Arab Emirates) 2003	Quarter-finals	5	3	0	2	6	10
(Netherlands) 2005	Round of 16	4	0	2	2	3	5
(Canada) 2007	Round of 16	4	2	2	0	6	3
(Egypt) 2009	Did not qualify						
(Colombia) 2011	Did not qualify						
(Turkey) 2013	Did not qualify						
(New Zealand) 2015	Did not qualify						
(South Korea) 2017	Round of 16	4	1	1	2	4	6
(Poland) 2019	Round of 16	4	1	2	1	4	2
(Argentina) 2023	Group stage	3	1	0	2	3	4
(Chile) 2025	Round of 16	4	3	0	1	7	1
(Azerbaijan) (Uzbekistan) 2027	To be determined						
(Armenia) (Georgia (country)) 2029	To be determined						
Total	12/26	50	19	12	19	67	61

*Denotes draws which includes knockout matches decided on penalty shootouts.

FIFA U-20 World Cup matches
Year	Round	Result		Opponent
1979	Group stage			
1979	Group stage	L	0-1	Spain
1979	Group stage	D	0-0	Algeria
1979	Group stage	D	1-1	Mexico
1995	Group stage			
1995	Group stage	D	2-2	Chile
1995	Group stage	L	1-2	Spain
1995	Group stage	W	2-0	Burundi
1995	Quarterfinals			
1995	Quarterfinals	L	1-2	Brazil
1997	Group stage			
1997	Group stage	L	1-2	Spain
1997	Group stage	L	6-2	Costa Rica
1997	Group stage	L	3-3	Paraguay
1997	Round of 16			
1997	Round of 16	W	1-0	Australia
1997	Quarterfinals			
1997	Quarterfinals	L	1-2	Ghana
1999	Group stage			
1999	Group stage	L	1-2	Cameroon
1999	Group stage	W	3-1	United States
1999	Group stage	W	2-0	England
1999	Round of 16			
1999	Round of 16	D	1-1	Portugal
1999	Quarterfinals			
1999	Quarterfinals	W	2-0	Mexico
1999	Semifinals			
1999	Semifinals	W	2-1	Uruguay
1999	Finals			
1999	Finals	L	0-4	Spain
2001	Group stage			
2001	Group stage	L	0-2	Australia
2001	Group stage	L	1-2	Angola
2001	Group stage	W	3-0	Czech Republic
2003	Group stage			
2003	Group stage	W	1-0	England
2003	Group stage	L	1-4	Colombia
2003	Group stage	W	1-0	Egypt
2003	Round of 16			
2003	Round of 16	W	2-1	South Korea
2003	Quarterfinals			
2003	Quarterfinals	L	1-5	Brazil
2005	Group stage			
2005	Group stage	L	1-2	Netherlands
2005	Group stage	D	1-1	Benin
2005	Group stage	D	1-1	Australia
2005	Round of 16			
2005	Round of 16	L	0-1	Morocco
2007	Group stage			
2007	Group stage	W	3-1	Scotland
2007	Group stage	W	1-0	Costa Rica
2007	Group stage	D	0-0	Nigeria
2007	Round of 16			
2007	Round of 16	D	2-2	Czech Republic
2017	Group stage			
2017	Group stage	W	2-1	South Africa
2017	Group stage	L	0-2	Uruguay
2017	Group stage	D	2-2	Italy
2017	Round of 16			
2017	Round of 16	L	0-1	Venezuela
2019	Group stage			
2019	Group stage	D	1-1	Ecuador
2019	Group stage	W	3-0	Mexico
2019	Group stage	D	0-0	Italy
2019	Round of 16			
2019	Round of 16	L	0-1	South Korea
2023	Group stage			
2023	Group stage	W	1-0	Senegal
2023	Group stage	L	1-2	Colombia
2023	Group stage	L	1-2	Israel
2025	Group stage			
2025	Group stage	W	2-0	Egypt
2025	Group stage	W	2-0	Chile
2025	Group stage	W	3-0	New Zealand
2025	Round of 16			
2025	Round of 16	L	0-1	France

=== AFC U-20 Asian Cup ===
Year	Result	Pld	W	D	L	GF	GA
(Malaysia) 1959	Third place	4	2	0	2	12	11
(Malaysia) 1960	Third place	4	2	1	1	10	11
(Thailand) 1961	Group stage	4	0	1	3	4	8
(Thailand) 1962	Group stage	4	1	0	3	4	9
(Malaysia) 1963	Group stage	5	1	1	3	8	13
(South Vietnam) 1964	Group stage	3	0	1	2	1	4
(Japan) 1965	Group stage	4	2	0	2	8	4
(Philippines) 1966	Group stage	4	0	0	4	2	13
(Thailand) 1967	Group stage	3	0	0	3	2	6
(South Korea) 1968	Group stage	3	0	1	2	0	6
(Thailand) 1969	Quarterfinals	3	1	0	2	5	11
(Philippines) 1970	Fourth place	6	2	1	3	5	13
(Japan) 1971	Fourth place	6	4	1	1	13	2
(Thailand) 1972	Quarterfinals	5	2	2	1	12	5
(Iran) 1973	Runners-up	5	1	2	2	5	6
(Thailand) 1974	Quarterfinals	4	2	0	2	9	4
(Kuwait) 1975	Group stage	4	2	0	2	10	5
(Thailand) 1976	Tie-breaker play-off	4	1	2	1	2	4
(Iran) 1977	Fourth place	5	1	2	2	8	6
(Bangladesh) 1978	Group stage	4	1	2	1	8	6
(Thailand) 1980	Final tournament	4	2	0	2	4	5
(Thailand) 1982	Didn't qualify						
(United Arab Emirates) 1985	Didn't qualify						
(Saudi Arabia) 1986	Didn't qualify						
(Qatar) 1988	Group stage	3	0	0	3	3	7
(Indonesia) 1990	Group stage	3	1	1	1	5	4
(United Arab Emirates) 1992	Third place	5	3	0	2	8	4
(Indonesia) 1994	Runners-up	6	4	0	2	9	4
(South Korea) 1996	Fourth place	6	3	1	2	12	6
(Thailand) 1998	Runners-up	6	3	1	2	18	10
(Iran) 2000	Runners-up	6	3	1	2	15	8
(Qatar) 2002	Runners-up	6	4	1	1	11	4
(Malaysia) 2004	Third place	6	3	3	0	10	3
(India) 2006	Runners-up	6	3	2	1	12	6
(Saudi Arabia) 2008	Quarterfinals	4	2	1	1	10	6
(China) 2010	Quarterfinals	4	3	0	1	11	4
(United Arab Emirates) 2012	Quarterfinals	4	1	1	2	2	4
(Myanmar) 2014	Quarterfinals	4	2	1	1	7	5
(Bahrain) 2016	Champions	6	4	2	0	13	0
(Indonesia) 2018	Semifinals	5	4	0	1	15	5
(Uzbekistan) 2023	Semifinals	5	4	1	0	11	4
(China) 2025	Semifinals	5	1	3	1	7	6
(China) 2027	Qualified						
Total	39/42	178	75	36	67	311	242

== Head-to-head record ==
The following table shows Japan's head-to-head record in the FIFA U-20 World Cup and AFC U-20 Asian Cup.

=== In FIFA U-20 World Cup ===
Opponent	Pld	W	D	L	GF	GA	GD	Win %
Algeria	1	0	1	0	0	0	+0	0.00
Angola	1	0	0	1	1	2	−1	0.00
Australia	3	1	1	1	2	3	−1	33.33
Benin	1	0	1	0	1	1	+0	0.00
Brazil	2	0	0	2	2	7	−5	0.00
Burundi	1	1	0	0	2	0	+2	100.00
Cameroon	1	0	0	1	1	2	−1	0.00
Chile	2	1	1	0	4	2	+2	50.00
Colombia	2	0	0	2	2	6	−4	0.00
Costa Rica	2	2	0	0	7	2	+5	100.00
Czech Republic	2	1	1	0	5	2	+3	50.00
Ecuador	1	0	1	0	1	1	+0	0.00
Egypt	2	2	0	0	3	0	+3	100.00
England	2	2	0	0	3	0	+3	100.00
France	1	0	0	1	0	1	−1	0.00
Ghana	1	0	0	1	1	2	−1	0.00
Israel	1	0	0	1	1	2	−1	0.00
Italy	2	0	2	0	2	2	+0	0.00
Mexico	3	2	1	0	6	1	+5	66.67
Morocco	1	0	0	1	0	1	−1	0.00
Netherlands	1	0	0	1	1	2	−1	0.00
New Zealand	1	1	0	0	3	0	+3	100.00
Nigeria	1	0	1	0	0	0	+0	0.00
Paraguay	1	0	1	0	3	3	+0	0.00
Portugal	1	0	1	0	1	1	+0	0.00
Scotland	1	1	0	0	3	1	+2	100.00
Senegal	1	1	0	0	1	0	+1	100.00
South Africa	1	1	0	0	2	1	+1	100.00
South Korea	2	1	0	1	2	2	+0	50.00
Spain	4	0	0	4	2	9	−7	0.00
United States	1	1	0	0	3	1	+2	100.00
Uruguay	2	1	0	1	2	3	−1	50.00
Venezuela	1	0	0	1	0	1	−1	0.00
Total	50	19	12	19	67	61	+6	38.00

=== In AFC U-20 Asian Cup ===
Opponent	Pld	W	D	L	GF	GA	GD	Win %
Afghanistan	1	1	0	0	6	1	+5	100.00
Australia	1	0	0	1	0	2	−2	0.00
Bahrain	4	2	1	1	7	5	+2	50.00
Bangladesh	2	2	0	0	4	0	+4	100.00
Brunei	2	2	0	0	12	1	+11	100.00
China	6	2	1	3	8	8	+0	33.33
Chinese Taipei	4	2	0	2	7	5	+2	50.00
Hong Kong	7	2	3	2	14	8	+6	28.57
India	6	4	1	1	11	5	+6	66.67
Indonesia	3	2	0	1	6	4	+2	66.67
Iran	11	2	2	7	11	20	−9	18.18
Iraq	7	3	1	3	19	10	+9	42.86
Israel	2	0	0	2	1	4	−3	0.00
Jordan	2	2	0	0	5	0	+5	100.00
Kuwait	4	3	0	1	6	3	+3	75.00
Kyrgyzstan	1	1	0	0	3	0	+3	100.00
Malaysia	8	3	2	3	13	19	−6	37.50
Myanmar	7	2	0	5	8	17	−9	28.57
Nepal	1	1	0	0	3	0	+3	100.00
North Korea	7	3	3	1	11	7	+4	42.86
Oman	1	0	1	0	2	2	+0	0.00
Philippines	2	1	1	0	7	2	+5	50.00
Qatar	5	3	1	1	11	1	+10	60.00
Saudi Arabia	9	5	3	1	15	9	+6	55.56
Singapore	9	5	0	4	20	12	+8	55.56
South Korea	24	2	6	16	20	46	−26	8.33
Sri Lanka	3	3	0	0	9	3	+6	100.00
Syria	5	1	3	1	9	8	+1	20.00
Tajikistan	2	2	0	0	8	0	+8	100.00
Thailand	14	4	3	7	17	21	−4	28.57
United Arab Emirates	7	3	2	2	11	7	+4	42.86
Uzbekistan	1	0	1	0	1	1	+0	0.00
Vietnam	8	5	1	2	18	11	+7	62.50
Yemen	2	2	0	0	8	0	+8	100.00
Total	178	75	36	67	311	242	+69	42.13

== See also ==
Japan
Men's

- International footballers
- National football team (Results (2020–present))
- National under-23 football team
- National under-20 football team
- National under-17 football team
- National futsal team
- National under-20 futsal team
- National beach soccer team

Women's

- International footballers
- National football team (Results)
- National under-20 football team
- National under-17 football team
- National futsal team
