= 1998 Toulon Tournament =

Tournament details
- Host country: France
- Dates: 14–23 May
- Teams: 8 (from 4 confederations)
- Venue(s): Arles, Aubagne, Cannes, La Seyne-sur-Mer, Lorgues, Mallemort, Manosque, Nîmes, Six-Fours-les-Plages, Toulon

Final positions
- Champions: Argentina (2nd title)
- Runners-up: France
- Third place: Portugal
- Fourth place: China

Tournament statistics
- Matches played: 18
- Goals scored: 58 (3.22 per match)
- Top scorer(s): (Argentina) Guerrero (England) Emile Heskey (3 goals each)
- Best player: (Argentina) Juan Román Riquelme
- Best goalkeeper: (Portugal) Nuno Santos

The 1998 Toulon Tournament was the 26th edition of the Toulon Tournament. The competition took place between 14 May and 23 May 1998 mostly in the Provence-Alpes-Côte d'Azur region of South Eastern France. Argentina achieved their second title, beating France 2–0 in the Final.

== Participants ==
- France (hosts)
- Argentina
- Brazil
- China
- England
- Germany
- Portugal
- South Africa

== Venues ==
The matches were played in these communes:

- Arles
- Aubagne
- Cannes
- La Seyne-sur-Mer
- Lorges
- Mallemort
- Manosque
- Nîmes
- Six-Fours-les-Plages
- Toulon

== Results ==
=== Group A ===
| Team | Pld | W | D | L | GF | GA | GD | Pts | Qualification |
|---|---|---|---|---|---|---|---|---|---|
| Argentina | 3 | 2 | 0 | 1 | 3 | 3 | 0 | 6 | Advance to Semi-final |
| France | 3 | 1 | 2 | 0 | 4 | 1 | +3 | 5 | Advance to Semi-final |
| England | 3 | 1 | 1 | 1 | 4 | 4 | 0 | 4 | |
| South Africa | 3 | 0 | 1 | 2 | 1 | 4 | −3 | 1 | |

Source: TT
14 May 1998

| Argentina | 1–0 | South Africa |
|---|---|---|
| Guerrero |

14 May 1998

| France | 1–1 | England |
|---|---|---|
| Saha | | Heskey |

16 May 1998

| England | 3–1 | South Africa |
|---|---|---|
| Lampard; Heskey | | Salmon |

16 May 1998

| France | 3–0 | Argentina |
|---|---|---|
| Moreira; Saha; Dabo |

18 May 1998

| Argentina | 2–0 | England |
|---|---|---|
| Quintana; Guerrero |

18 May 1998

| France | 0–0 | South Africa |

=== Group B ===
| Team | Pld | W | D | L | GF | GA | GD | Pts | Qualification |
|---|---|---|---|---|---|---|---|---|---|
| Portugal | 3 | 2 | 0 | 1 | 2 | 1 | +1 | 6 | Advance to Semi-final |
| China | 3 | 1 | 2 | 0 | 3 | 2 | +1 | 5 | Advance to Semi-final |
| Brazil | 3 | 1 | 1 | 1 | 4 | 3 | +1 | 4 | |
| Germany | 3 | 0 | 1 | 2 | 2 | 5 | −3 | 1 | |

Source: TT

All times local (CEST)

15 May 1998

| Germany | 1–1 | China |
|---|---|---|
| Hertzsch | | Sui Dongliang |

15 May 1998

| Portugal | 1–0 | Brazil |
|---|---|---|
| Boa Morte |

17 May 1998

| China | 1–0 | Portugal |
|---|---|---|
| Li Jinyu |

17 May 1998

| Brazil | 3–1 | Germany |
|---|---|---|
| Eriberto; Adailton | | Sidney (o.g.) |

19 May 1998

| Brazil | 1–1 | China |
|---|---|---|
| Leandro | | Ma Yongkang |

19 May 1998

| Portugal | 1–0 | Germany |
|---|---|---|
| Jose Antonio |

== Knockout stage ==
=== Semi-finals ===
21 May 1998

| Argentina | 1–0 | China |
|---|---|---|
| Galletti 91' |

Lorgues

21 May 1998

| France | 0–0 | Portugal |
Penalties
| Dabo (penalty scored); Henin (penalty scored); Silvestre (penalty scored); Delhommeau (penalty scored) | 4–1 | Delfim (penalty scored) |

Cannes

=== Third place play-off ===
21 May 1998

| Portugal | 2–0 | China |
|---|---|---|
| Boa Morte; Delfim | Report |

Toulon

=== Final ===
23 May 1998

| Argentina | 2–0 | France |
|---|---|---|
| F. Guerrero 48'; W. Samuel 69' |
