= Padilla Municipality =

Padilla Municipality may refer to:

- Padilla Municipality, Chuquisaca, in Chuquisaca Department Bolivia
- Padilla Municipality, Tamaulipas, Mexico
- Padilla Municipality, Cauca, Colombia
