= Miguel Nogueira =

Portuguese footballer

Personal information
- Full name: João Miguel da Costa Nogueira
- Date of birth: 27 February 2005 (age 21)
- Place of birth: Felgueiras, Portugal
- Height: 1.82 m (6 ft 0 in)
- Position: Right winger

Team information
- Current team: Vitória de Guimarães
- Number: 17

Youth career
- 2012–2014: Felgueiras
- 2014–2017: CB Póvoa Lanhoso
- 2017–2019: Benfica
- 2019–2024: Vitória de Guimarães

Senior career*
Years	Team	Apps	(Gls)
2024–2026	Vitória de Guimarães B	48	(16)
2025–	Vitória de Guimarães	23	(1)

International career^{‡}
2025–2026	Portugal U20	9	(1)
- * Club domestic league appearances and goals as of 16:43, 24 September 2026 (UTC) ‡ National team caps and goals as of 16:43, 24 September 2026 (UTC)

João Miguel da Costa Nogueira (born 27 February 2005) is a Portuguese footballer who plays as a right winger for Vitória de Guimarães.

== Club career ==
Born in Felgueiras in the Porto District, Nogueira began playing as a youth for hometown club F.C. Felgueiras before joining CB Póvoa Lanhoso and then the academy of Benfica. He moved back to the north in 2019, joining Vitória de Guimarães. In June 2024, after playing twice for the reserve team in the fourth-tier Campeonato de Portugal, he signed a contract until 2028.

In 2024–25, Vitória B won promotion, but lost the final on a penalty shootout to Lusitano Évora, after Nogueira had missed a chance to put his team 2–0 up with a header against the crossbar. The following season, he was one of several B-team players called up to the first team by manager Luís Pinto, and scored his first Primeira Liga goal in a 5–0 home win over Tondela on 3 April 2026. Pedro Morais of national sports newspaper Record remarked in May that Nogueira was now the first choice on the right side of the attack.

== International career ==
Nogueira was called up for the Portugal under-20 team at the 2026 Maurice Revello Tournament, and scored in a 4–1 opening win over Japan as his team went on to win the title.
