= 1984 Toulon Tournament =

Toulon Youth Festival

Tournament details
- Host country: France
- Dates: 5 May – 13 May
- Teams: 8 (from 3 confederations)

Final positions
- Champions: France (2nd title)
- Runners-up: Soviet Union
- Third place: Czechoslovakia
- Fourth place: Netherlands

Tournament statistics
- Top scorer: (Algeria) Zaghini
- Best player: (Soviet Union) Rusaiev

The 1984 Toulon Tournament was the 12th edition of the Toulon Tournament and began on 5 May and ended on 13 May 1984. France won the tournament, defeating the Soviet Union in the final.

== Participant teams ==
- France
- Algeria
- Bulgaria
- Czechoslovakia
- Ivory Coast
- Mexico
- Portugal
- Soviet Union

== Results ==
=== Group A ===
Team	Pld	W	D	L	GF	GA	GD	Pts	Qualification
France	3	3	0	0	8	2	+6	6	Advance to Final
Czechoslovakia	3	1	1	1	6	3	+3	3	Advance to Third place match
Ivory Coast	3	1	0	2	1	5	−4	2	
Mexico	3	0	1	2	2	7	−5	1	

5 May 1984

Czechoslovakia	1–1	Mexico
Bilek 20'		Torre 35'

Marseille
Attendance: 3,500
Referee: Dante (Portugal)

5 May 1984

France	1–0	Ivory Coast
, 88' (o.g.)

7 May 1984

Czechoslovakia	4–0	Ivory Coast
Víger (pen.) (pen.); Kukleta

Marseille

7 May 1984

France	5–1	Mexico

Toulon

10 May 1984

France	2–1	Czechoslovakia
Pascal 19'; Fournier 70'		Dostál 59'

Toulon
Attendance: 2,000
Referee: Van Langenhove (Belgium)

10 May 1984

Ivory Coast	1–0	Mexico

=== Group B ===
Team	Pld	W	D	L	GF	GA	GD	Pts	Qualification
Soviet Union	3	2	1	0	8	0	+8	5	Advance to Final
Netherlands	3	2	1	0	3	1	+2	5	Advance to Third place match
Algeria	3	1	0	2	7	5	+2	2	
Bulgaria	3	0	0	3	2	14	−12	0	

=== Third place match ===
13 May 1984

Czechoslovakia	2–0	Netherlands
Dostál 59'; Kukleta 80'

Attendance: 4,000
Referee: Dante (Portugal)

=== Final ===
13 May 1984

France	1–1 (a.e.t.)	Soviet Union
Fournier 18'		Rusaiev 24'
Penalties
	4–3
