= Stanislav Dostál (footballer, born 1963) =

Czechoslovak footballer (born 1963)

Personal information
- Date of birth: 7 November 1963 (age 62)
- Positions: Midfielder; striker

Senior career*
Years	Team	Apps	(Gls)
1982–1986	Vítkovice		
1986	Dukla Banská Bystrica		
1987–1992	Vítkovice		
1992–1993	Altay Izmir		
1993–1996	Zlín	58	(2)

International career
1983–1985	Czechoslovakia U21	20	(7)
1986–1988	Czechoslovakia Olympic	2	(1)
- * Club domestic league appearances and goals

Stanislav Dostál (born 7 November 1963) is a Czech former footballer who played as a midfielder and striker. With a career spanning the era of the Czechoslovak First League and the Czech First League, he made a total of 297 domestic top-flight appearances, scoring 37 goals.

Dostál played in the 1984 Toulon Tournament, scoring for Czechoslovakia U21 in their 2–1 group stage loss to France. He scored his second goal of the tournament in the third place match against the Netherlands, which resulted in a 2–0 Czechoslovakia win.

Dostál was part of the title-winning Vítkovice side in the 1985–86 Czechoslovak First League. He played in the 1987–88 UEFA Cup, scoring twice in 8 appearances for Vítkovice, who reached the quarter finals after defeating Swedish side AIK Fotboll, Dundee United of Scotland and Portugal's Vitória. Dostál scored his first goal of the competition in the first round second leg match, away against AIK, which resulted in a 2–0 Vítkovice win. Three weeks later he scored the winning goal in the 78th minute of the second round first leg game, away against Dundee United, which Vítkovice won 2–1.
