= Franck Chaumin =

French footballer (born 1969)

Personal information
- Date of birth: 2 November 1969 (age 56)
- Place of birth: Blois, France
- Height: 1.85 m (6 ft 1 in)
- Position: Goalkeeper

Youth career
- 1987–1989: INF Clairefontaine

Senior career*
Years	Team	Apps	(Gls)
1989–1991	Quimper CFC		
1991–1993	Gazélec Ajaccio	68	(0)
1993–1995	Sochaux	0	(0)
1995–1998	Mulhouse	80	(0)
1998–1999	Amicale de Lucé		

International career
1987	France U18		
1990	France U21	1	(0)
- * Club domestic league appearances and goals

Franck Chaumin (born 2 November 1969) is a French former footballer.

== Career statistics ==
=== Club ===
Appearances and goals by club, season and competition
Club	Season	League			Cup		League Cup		Other		Total	
Club	Season	Division	Apps	Goals	Apps	Goals	Apps	Goals	Apps	Goals	Apps	Goals
Quimper CFC	1989–90	Division 2	20	0	0	0	0	0	0	0	20	0
Gazélec Ajaccio	1991–92	Division 2	34	0	0	0	0	0	0	0	34	0
Gazélec Ajaccio	1992–93	Division 2	34	0	3	0	0	0	0	0	37	0
Gazélec Ajaccio	Total		68	0	3	0	0	0	0	0	71	0
Sochaux	1993–94	Division 1	0	0	0	0	0	0	0	0	0	0
Sochaux	1994–95	Division 1	0	0	0	0	0	0	0	0	0	0
Sochaux	Total		0	0	0	0	0	0	0	0	0	0
Mulhouse	1995–96	Division 2	23	0	0	0	2	0	0	0	25	0
Mulhouse	1996–97	Division 2	26	0	0	0	1	0	0	0	27	0
Mulhouse	1997–98	Division 2	31	0	1	0	1	0	0	0	33	0
Mulhouse	Total		80	0	1	0	4	0	0	0	85	0
Career total			168	0	4	0	4	0	0	0	176	0

== Honours ==
Individual

- Toulon Tournament Best Goalkeeper: 1989
