= Ourique DC =

Portuguese sports club

- Full name: Ourique Desportos Clube
- Founded: 1937

Ourique Desportos Clube is a Portuguese sports club from Ourique.

The men's football team played in the Terceira Divisão, then the fourth tier of Portuguese football, from 1997 to 2002. In 2011–12 the team finished 7th of 13 in the I league of AF Beja, disappearing after that.

== Notable players ==
- (Portugal) João Rego (youth)
