= Jelani McGhee =

Japanese footballer (born 2008)

Personal information
- Full name: Jelani Ren McGhee Makinose
- Date of birth: December 24, 2008 (age 17)
- Place of birth: Chatan, Okinawa, Japan
- Height: 1.86 m (6 ft 1 in)
- Position: Forward

Team information
- Current team: RB Omiya Ardija
- Number: 49

Youth career
- FC Ryukyu
- FC Ichikawa
- FC Ryukyu

Senior career*
Years	Team	Apps	(Gls)
2026–	RB Omiya Ardija	4	(0)

International career^{‡}
2025	Japan U17	5	(1)
2026–	Japan U20	7	(1)
- * Club domestic league appearances and goals as of 26 September 2026 ‡ National team caps and goals as of 3 October 2026

Jelani Ren McGhee Makinose (マギージェラニー 蓮, Mcghee Jelani Ren; born December 24, 2008) is a Japanese professional footballer who plays as a forward for RB Omiya Ardija.

== Club career ==
McGhee played for the FC Ryukyu U-18 team.

On January 7, 2026, FC Ryukyu announced they signed McGhee to a professional contract, after which they simultaneously transferred him to RB Omiya Ardija.

== International career ==
McGhee was born to an African-American father and a Japanese mother, which made him eligible to represent the United States and Japan at an international level.

In October 2025, McGhee was named to the Japan U-17 squad for the 2025 FIFA U-20 World Cup. In the round of 16 match against North Korea, he scored the opening goal with a header, helping Japan advance to the quarterfinals.

McGhee was part of the Japan U-20 squad for the 2026 Maurice Revello Tournament.

== Style of play ==
McGhee is considered a striker-type forward with a combination of strength and speed, making most of his physique. He cited Belgian footballer Romelu Lukaku as his role model.
