= Zé António =

Portuguese footballer

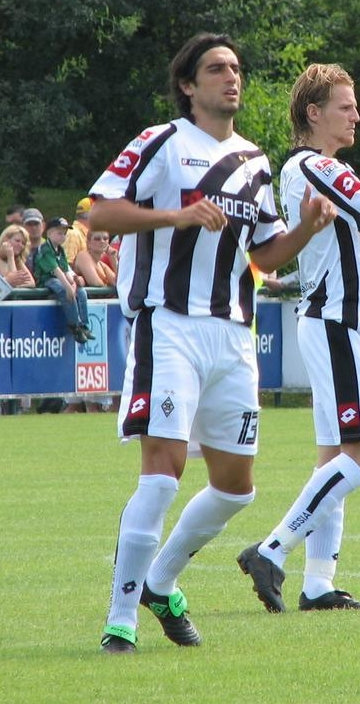
- Zé António with Borussia Mönchengladbach in 2006

Personal information
- Full name: José António dos Santos Silva
- Date of birth: 14 March 1977 (age 49)
- Place of birth: Torres Vedras, Portugal
- Height: 1.86 m (6 ft 1 in)
- Position: Centre-back

Youth career
- 1987–1994: Torreense

Senior career*
Years	Team	Apps	(Gls)
1994–1998	Torreense	100	(14)
1998–2000	Porto	0	(0)
1998–1999	→ Leça (loan)	13	(0)
1999–2000	→ Alverca (loan)	0	(0)
2000–2002	Alverca	50	(2)
2002–2003	Varzim	15	(5)
2003–2005	Académica	67	(2)
2005–2008	Borussia Mönchengladbach	64	(3)
2008	→ Manisaspor (loan)	13	(1)
2008–2009	Racing Santander	0	(0)
2010–2011	União Leiria	43	(1)
2012–2015	Porto B	86	(5)
Total		451	(33)

International career
1997–1998	Portugal U20	8	(2)
1998–1999	Portugal U21	7	(0)
- * Club domestic league appearances and goals

José António dos Santos Silva (born 14 March 1977), known as Zé António, is a Portuguese former professional footballer who played as a central defender.

He amassed Primeira Liga totals of 175 games and ten goals over eight seasons, representing in the competition Alverca, Varzim, Académica and União de Leiria. He added 145 matches and 12 goals in the Segunda Liga, in a 21-year senior career.

Zé António also played in Germany, Turkey and Spain.

== Club career ==
Born in Torres Vedras, Lisbon District, Zé António began playing football for hometown's S.C.U. Torreense, being acquired in 1998 by Primeira Liga club FC Porto. However, he never represented the latter officially, going on to have loan spells at Leça F.C. and F.C. Alverca and being definitively sold to Alverca in summer 2000.

After another top-division campaign, with Varzim SC (ended in relegation), Zé António joined Académica de Coimbra and played there from 2003 to 2005, forming an interesting defensive partnership with Tonel – later of Sporting CP – in his first year.

Avoiding relegation with Académica at the end of 2004–05, Zé António took advantage of his expiring contract to sign for Borussia Mönchengladbach in the German Bundesliga, on an initial two-year deal. An undisputed starter throughout the 2005–06 campaign, he opened his scoring account in his fourth league match, heading the winner in a 2–1 home win over MSV Duisburg on 10 September; Borussia suffered relegation in 2007.

In January 2008, having made no appearances in 2007–08 (2. Bundesliga), Zé António moved on loan to Turkey's Vestel Manisaspor for six months. At the end of June, he switched to Spain and signed a two-year contract with La Liga side Racing de Santander.

In early December 2009, after having appeared only in one Copa del Rey match for the Cantabrians, against Real Murcia CF, his spell also including a demotion to the B team and legal action undertaken by the player, Zé António terminated his link. He returned to his country in January 2010, joining U.D. Leiria on a one-and-a-half-year deal.

Zé António only missed one game in the 2010–11 season, as Leiria once again managed to retain their top-division status. In June 2011 the 34-year-old left the club, returning to action after one year out of football with Porto's reserves in the Segunda Liga.

== International career ==
Aged 29, Zé António received his first callup for the Portugal national team, being selected by Luiz Felipe Scolari for UEFA Euro 2008 qualifiers against Azerbaijan and Poland. He eventually failed to earn a full cap, but did represent the under-20s at the 1998 Toulon Tournament, scoring in the 1–0 group-stage win over Germany in a third-place finish.
