= Jhojan Amaya =

Colombian footballer (born 2006)

Personal information
- Full name: Jhojan Camilo Amaya Lucumí
- Date of birth: 1 April 2006 (age 20)
- Place of birth: Padilla, Cauca, Colombia
- Position: Winger

Team information
- Current team: Atlético Nacional
- Number: 42

Youth career
- Incauca
- 2023–2024: Atlético Nacional

Senior career*
| Years | Team | Apps | (Gls) |
| 2024– | Atlético Nacional | 2 | (0) |

International career
| 2022 | Colombia U17 | 1 | (0) |
- * Club domestic league appearances and goals as of 23:04, 13 February 2024 (UTC)

Jhojan Camilo Amaya Lucumí (born 1 April 2006) is a Colombian footballer currently playing as a winger for Atlético Nacional.

== Club career ==
Born in Padilla in the Cauca Department of Colombia, Amaya began his career with Incauca, where in 2022 he scored 33 goals in 36 games, earning him a call up to the Colombia under-17 side. These performances caught the eye of Categoría Primera A side Atlético Nacional, who would go on to sign Amaya the following year. After first-choice striker Dorlan Pabón was diagnosed with a virus, Amaya was drafted in to replace him in the squad for a first division match against Águilas Doradas, and he made his debut in Atlético Nacional's 3–0 win, coming on as a late substitute for Daniel Mantilla.

== International career ==
Having been called up to Colombia's under-17 squad while at Incauca, Amaya made his debut in a 2–0 win against Chile in August 2022.

== Career statistics ==
=== Club ===
As of 13 February 2024.

Appearances and goals by club, season and competition
| Club | Season | League | | | Cup | | Continental | | Other | | Total | |
| Club | Season | Division | Apps | Goals | Apps | Goals | Apps | Goals | Apps | Goals | Apps | Goals |
|---|---|---|---|---|---|---|---|---|---|---|---|---|
| Atlético Nacional | 2024 | Categoría Primera A | 2 | 0 | 0 | 0 | – | | 0 | 0 | 2 | 0 |
| Career total | | | 2 | 0 | 0 | 0 | 0 | 0 | 0 | 0 | 2 | 0 |
