= Jules Ahoka =

Democratic Republic of the Congo footballer (born 2006)

- Ahoka in 2026

Personal information
- Full name: Jules "Busquets" Ahoka
- Date of birth: 8 May 2006 (age 20)
- Place of birth: Peterlee, DR Congo
- Height: 1.91 m (6 ft 3 in)
- Position: Midfielder

Team information
- Current team: Sunderland
- Number: 29

Youth career
- AC Normands

Senior career*
Years	Team	Apps	(Gls)
2023–2025	AC Normands		
2025–2026	Royal Antwerp	4	(0)
2026–	Sunderland	2	(0)

International career^{‡}
2025–	DR Congo U20	4	(0)
2026–	DR Congo U23	6	(2)
- * Club domestic league appearances and goals as of 8 November 2026 ‡ National team caps and goals as of 13 June 2026

Jules Ahoka (born 8 May 2006) is a Congolese professional footballer who plays as a midfielder for Premier League club Sunderland.

== Club career ==
Ahoka began his career playing for Linafoot Ligue 2 side AC Normands in the Democratic Republic of the Congo.

In September 2025, Ahoka signed for Royal Antwerp from AC Normands.

On 24 August 2026, he joined Premier League club Sunderland for a reported transfer fee of €10 million. On 15 October 2026, in match week two of the Europa League, Ahoka netted his first Sunderland goal with a headed equaliser against Torreense in the 67th minute. Sunderland would go on to win the game 2–1.

== International career ==
Ahoka has represented the DR Congo under-20's, scoring two goals at the 2026 Maurice Revello Tournament.

== Style of play ==
Ahoka plays as a midfielder. He is known for his vision.Ahoka played his first full premier league game for Sunderland against Chelsea 8th November 2026 where we went on to win the man of the match award.

== Career statistics ==
=== Club ===
As of match played 28 October 2026

Appearances and goals by club, season and competition
Club	Season	League			National cup		League Cup (Note: Includes EFL Cup)		Europe		Other		Total	
Club	Season	Division	Apps	Goals	Apps	Goals	Apps	Goals	Apps	Goals	Apps	Goals	Apps	Goals
Royal Antwerp	2025–26	Belgian Pro League	2	0	0	0	—		—		0	0	2	0
Royal Antwerp	2026–27	Belgian Pro League	2	0	—		—		—		—		2	0
Royal Antwerp	Total		4	0	0	0	—		—		0	0	4	0
Sunderland	2026–27	Premier League	1	0	0	0	2	0	2 (Note: Appearances in UEFA Europa League)	1	—		5	1
Career total			5	0	0	0	2	0	2	1	0	0	9	1
