= Oumar Konaté =

Ivorian footballer (born 2007)

Personal information
- Date of birth: 5 May 2007 (age 19)
- Place of birth: Abidjan, Ivory Coast
- Position: Forward

Team information
- Current team: Laval (on loan from Monaco)
- Number: 9

Youth career
- –2018: Sésame Academy FC
- 2018–2023: JEK FC

Senior career*
| Years | Team | Apps | (Gls) |
| 2023 | JEK FC | | |
| 2023 | → ASI Abengourou (loan) | | |
| 2023–2025 | SOL FC | | |
| 2025– | Monaco | 1 | (0) |
| 2026– | → Laval (loan) | 2 | (0) |

International career^{‡}
- Ivory Coast U16
- Ivory Coast U20
| 2026– | Ivory Coast U23 | 4 | (3) |
- * Club domestic league appearances and goals as of 22:26, 13 November 2026 (UTC) ‡ National team caps and goals as of 22:26, 13 November 2026 (UTC)

Oumar Konaté (born 5 May 2007) is an Ivorian professional footballer who plays as a forward for Ligue 2 club Laval, on loan from Ligue 1 club Monaco.

== Club career ==
Early in his career, Konaté was a youth player at Sésame Academy FC in Abobo, Abidjan. In 2018, after undergoing several trials, he joined JEK FC, an academy created by Jean Evrard Kouassi. Although initially positioned as a left-back, he was later moved to forward. In January 2023, at 15 years old, he was loaned out to ASI Abengourou, where he played in the Ivorian Ligue 1. After joining SOL FC in Abobo, Konaté regularly played in the Ivorian Ligue 1, coming to be named the best young player of the 2024–25 season with 12 league goals to his tally.

On 9 July 2025, aged 18, Konaté signed for French Ligue 1 club Monaco on a professional contract, initially joining the youth academy. In the 2025–26 season, he made nine appearances for the club's youth teams, scoring six goals and providing two assists across all competitions. On 20 August 2026, Konaté made his professional debut for Monaco in the UEFA Conference League play-off round against Górnik Zabrze (3–2 win). He made his Ligue 1 debut three days later in a 1–0 win over Le Havre. On 15 October 2026, he was loaned out to Ligue 2 club Laval until the end of the season.

== International career ==
In 2023, Konaté finished as the top scorer in the Montaigu Tournament, scoring seven for the Ivory Coast under-16s, including six goals against New Caledonia. In 2024, he recorded an assist against France and a goal against Mexico in the Ivory Coast under-20s' run to the Maurice Revello Tournament final, where they lost to Ukraine.

== Honours ==
Ivory Coast U20

- Maurice Revello Tournament runner-up: 2024

Individual

- Montaigu Tournament top goalscorer: 2023
- Ivory Coast Ligue 1 Young Player of the Year: 2024–25
