= Jocelin Ta Bi =

Ivorian footballer (born 2005)

- Ta Bi with Sunderland in 2026

Personal information
- Date of birth: 9 February 2005 (age 21)
- Place of birth: Attécoubé, Ivory Coast
- Height: 1.75 m (5 ft 9 in)
- Position: Winger

Team information
- Current team: Sunderland
- Number: 37

Youth career
- JC Abidjan
- 2023–2024: Beitar Nes Tubruk

Senior career*
Years	Team	Apps	(Gls)
2024–2026	Maccabi Netanya	0	(0)
2024–2026	→ Hapoel Petah Tikva (loan)	39	(7)
2026–	Sunderland	3	(0)

International career^{‡}
2026–	Ivory Coast U20	4	(4)
- * Club domestic league appearances and goals as of 10 October 2026 ‡ National team caps and goals as of 13 June 2026

Jocelin Ta Bi (born 9 February 2005) is an Ivorian professional footballer who plays as a winger for Premier League club Sunderland.

== Club career ==
=== Youth career ===
Jocelin Ta Bi was born on 9 February 2005 and he began at the academy of JC Abidjan in the Ivory Coast before joining Beitar Nes Tubruk in 2023.

=== Maccabi Netanya ===
He joined Israeli Premier League club Maccabi Netanya on 1 August 2024. He made no appearances for the club between 2024 and 2026.

==== Loan to Haopel Petah Tikva ====
Ta Bi was loaned out to Liga Leumit club Hapoel Petah Tikva for the 2024–25 season. He debuted on 26 August 2024 during the 3–2 victory against Hapoel Kfar Saba, and he scored his first goal for the club on 25 October 2024 during the 2–0 victory against Hapoel Rishon LeZion. He was part of the team which finished second in the Liga Leumit to secure promotion.

In the 2025–26 season, his loan was extended at Hapoel Petah Tikva, where he featured 12 times in the Israeli Premier League, scoring twice and providing two assists.

=== Sunderland ===
Ta Bi signed for Premier League club Sunderland on a four-and-a-half year contract on 16 January 2026. He made his first team debut on 15 February 2026 as a substitute in an FA Cup fourth round win against Oxford United.

== International career ==
Ta Bi has represented the Ivory Coast under-20's, scoring four goals at the 2026 Maurice Revello Tournament.

== Career statistics ==
=== Club ===
As of match played 28 October 2026

Appearances and goals by club, season and competition
Club	Season	League			National cup (Note: Includes Israel State Cup, FA Cup)		League cup (Note: Includes EFL Cup)		Europe		Total	
Club	Season	Division	Apps	Goals	Apps	Goals	Apps	Goals	Apps	Goals	Apps	Goals
Maccabi Netanya	2024–25	Israeli Premier League	—		—		0	0	—		0	0
Hapoel Petah Tikva (loan)	2024–25	Liga Leumit	27	5	1	0	—		—		28	5
Hapoel Petah Tikva (loan)	2025–26	Israeli Premier League	12	2	0	0	—		—		12	2
Hapoel Petah Tikva (loan)	Total		39	7	1	0	—		—		40	7
Sunderland	2025–26	Premier League	1	0	1	0	—		—		2	0
Sunderland	2026–27	Premier League	1	0	0	0	2	0	0	0	3	0
Sunderland	Total		2	0	1	0	2	0	0	0	5	0
Career total			41	7	2	0	2	0	0	0	45	7

== Honours ==
Hapoel Petah Tikva

- Liga Leumit: runner-up 2024–25
