= Dhirar Brik =

Personal information
- Date of birth: 13 October 2007 (age 19)
- Place of birth: Rovereto, Italy
- Height: 1.83 m (6 ft 0 in)
- Position: Defensive midfielder

Team information
- Current team: Südtirol
- Number: 46

Youth career
- 2022–2025: Südtirol

Senior career*
Years	Team	Apps	(Gls)
2025–	Südtirol	9	(0)

International career^{‡}
2024–	Tunisia U23	4	(0)
- * Club domestic league appearances and goals as of 8 November 2026 ‡ National team caps and goals as of 8 November 2026

Dhirar Brik (Arabic: ضرار بريك; born 13 October 2007) is a professional footballer who plays as a defensive midfielder for Serie B club FC Südtirol. Born in Italy, he represents Tunisia at the youth international level.

== Club career ==
Brik developed through the youth ranks of the FC Südtirol academy, representing the club at the youth levels in the Primavera league. On September 18, 2024, he signed a professional contract with the senior squad through 30 June 2027. He made his professional and Serie B debut during the 2025–26 season, making 4 substitute appearances. He expanded his senior role during the 2026–27 campaign, earning his first professional starts and featuring in both league play and the Coppa Italia.

== International career ==
Brik is a youth international for Tunisia. He has been capped for the Tunisia U23 national team, participating in international fixtures against teams such as the DR Congo and Ivory Coast, as well as the Maurice Revello Tournament.
