= Ma Yongkang =

Chinese footballer

Personal information
- Date of birth: 9 March 1977 (age 49)
- Place of birth: Qingdao, Shandong, China
- Height: 1.83 m (6 ft 0 in)
- Position: Defender

Senior career*
Years	Team	Apps	(Gls)
1995–2006	Qingdao Jonoon	161	(3)
2007	Shanghai Stars	12	(0)
Total		173	(3)

International career
1998	China U21		
1998	China	1	(0)

Managerial career
- 2010: Qingdao Jonoon (assistant)
- 2012-2015: China Women (assistant)
- 2016: China U22 (assistant)
- 2017–2020: Wuhan Zall (assistant)
- 2019: China U22 (assistant)
- 2024: Qingdao Red Lions (assistant)
- 2024–2025: Qingdao Red Lions
Medal record
Men's football
Representing China
Asian Games
Bronze medal – third place	1998 Bangkok	Football
- * Club domestic league appearances and goals

Ma Yongkang (simplified Chinese: 马永康; traditional Chinese: 馬永康; pinyin: Mǎ Yǒngkāng; born 9 March 1977) is a Chinese former footballer who played as a defender, being capped once for the China national football team.

== Career statistics ==
=== Club ===
Club	Season	League			Cup		Continental		Other		Total	
Club	Season	Division	Apps	Goals	Apps	Goals	Apps	Goals	Apps	Goals	Apps	Goals
Qingdao Jonoon	1995	Jia-A	3	0	0	0	–		0	0	3	0
Qingdao Jonoon	1996	Jia-B	–									
Qingdao Jonoon	1997	Jia-A	0	0	0	0	–		0	0	0	0
Qingdao Jonoon	1998	Jia-A	12	0	0	0	–		0	0	12	0
Qingdao Jonoon	1999	Jia-A	24	2	0	0	–		0	0	24	2
Qingdao Jonoon	2000	Jia-A	25	0	0	0	–		0	0	25	0
Qingdao Jonoon	2001	Jia-A	24	0	0	0	–		0	0	24	0
Qingdao Jonoon	2002	Jia-A	24	1	0	0	–		0	0	24	1
Qingdao Jonoon	2003	Jia-A	20	0	0	0	–		0	0	20	0
Qingdao Jonoon	2004	Chinese Super League	13	0	0	0	–		0	0	13	0
Qingdao Jonoon	2005	Chinese Super League	16	0	0	0	–		0	0	16	0
Qingdao Jonoon	2006	Chinese Super League	0	0	0	0	–		0	0	0	0
Qingdao Jonoon	Total		161	3	0	0	0	0	0	0	161	3
Shanghai Stars	2007	China League One	12	0	0	0	–		0	0	12	0
Career total			173	3	0	0	0	0	0	0	173	3

=== International ===
National team	Year	Apps	Goals
China	1998	1	0
Total		1	0
