= Stade de Lattre-de-Tassigny =

Football stadium in Aubagne, France

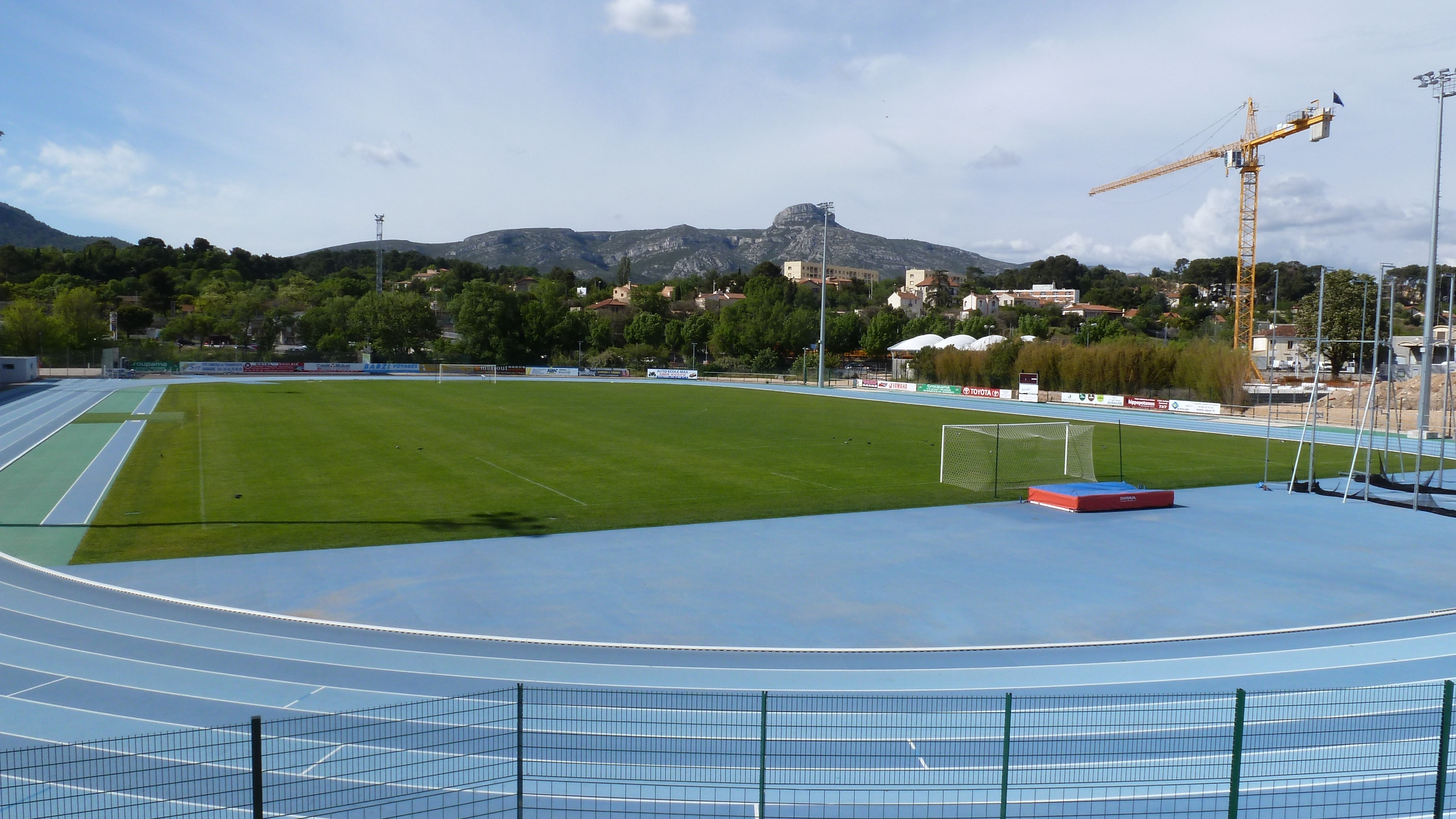
- Interactive map of Stade de Lattre-de-Tassigny
- Location: Avenue Simon Lagunas, Aubagne, France
- Coordinates: 43.294004°N 5.562333°E
- Owner: City of Aubagne
- Capacity: 1,200 (963 seated)
- Surface: Grass

Construction
- Opened: 1989
- Renovated: 2011, 2024

Tenant
- Aubagne Air Bel

Stade de Lattre-de-Tassigny is a multi-use stadium located in Aubagne, in the Bouches-du-Rhône department of southern France. Opened in 1989, it takes its name from French marshal Jean de Lattre de Tassigny, who is credited with liberating Aubagne during World War II. The stadium is used for both football and athletics, and serves as the home ground of SC Aubagne Air Bel.

The stadium forms part of the wider Complexe de Lattre-de-Tassigny / Bras d'Or sports complex, which also includes a meeting room, massage and physiotherapy facilities, a medical room, and a car park. The complex is situated at the entrance to Aubagne town centre, close to the town's bus and rail stations.

The stadium has a capacity of 1,200, including 963 seated, all covered by a single stand running the length of the pitch. A notable feature of the ground is a pedestrian footbridge on the Avenue Simon-Lagunas that overlooks the stadium, from which passers-by can watch matches for free. The athletics track is well regarded, and is known locally for its distinctive blue surface.

Several matches of the France national under-21 football team and other international youth sides have been held at the stadium as part of the Toulon Tournament, with notable players such as Zinedine Zidane, Alan Shearer, Thierry Henry, Juan Román Riquelme, David Ginola, Hristo Stoichkov, Djibril Cissé and Cristiano Ronaldo having played there.

== 2024 Paris Olympics ==
The stadium served as a training base for football teams competing at the 2024 Summer Olympics, which held its football matches at the nearby Stade Vélodrome in Marseille. In October 2023, the Paris 2024 organising committee confirmed the stadium as one of 620 training sites across France, with 34 located in the Bouches-du-Rhône department.

== Renovations ==
=== 2011 renovation ===
In 2010–11, the stadium underwent a renovation. The athletics track was completely rebuilt to Olympic standards, enabling it to host high-level competitions. Four floodlight masts were also installed, giving the stadium a level 3 lighting certification, meaning it can host evening matches at national level.

=== 2024 renovation ===
At the end of the 2023–24 season, Aubagne Football Club (renamed Sporting Club Aubagne Air-Bel in May 2025 following a merger with a Marseille-based club) was promoted to the Championnat National for the first time in its history. The stadium met the requirements for third-division football in all areas except lighting. A new lighting system was therefore installed during the summer of 2024, and was commissioned on 23 October 2024 for the club's first ever match at National level, against Rouen.

=== Controversy ===
Due to the stadium's location below the Avenue Simon-Lagunas footbridge, spectators are able to watch matches free of charge from the bridge, which offers an excellent view of the pitch. This situation has frustrated club officials due to the resulting loss of revenue, potential safety concerns, and reduced atmosphere inside the ground. Approximately one third of the crowd at each match watches from outside the stadium, an unusual situation at this level of French football. The club has called for the construction of a new stadium to match its ambitions of eventually reaching Ligue 2.
