= Maurice Revello Tournament =

Annual football tournament in France

- Founded: 1967; 59 years ago
- Region: France
- Teams: 12
- Related competitions: FIFA U-20 World Cup
- Current champions: Portugal (2026)
- Most championships: France (14 titles)
- Website: tournoimauricerevello.com
- 2026 Maurice Revello Tournament

The Maurice Revello Tournament (officially French: the Festival International "Espoirs" – Tournoi Maurice Revello), previously known as the Toulon Tournament, is a football tournament which traditionally features invited national teams composed of youth players from U-17 to U-23 level. Although the first tournament in 1967 featured club teams, it has been limited to national teams since 1975 (except in 1986 and 1989 when INF Vichy was invited). The tournament is held around Provence-Alpes-Côte d'Azur, with the final usually being held in Toulon. The tournament was renamed in honour of Maurice Revello, who started the tournament in 1967 and died in 2016.

== History ==
Toulon Tournament is a tournament not run under the supervision of FIFA or an individual national association. It is deemed the most prestigious of all friendly tournaments involving youth teams, and was considered an unofficial world championship before FIFA introduced the official World Youth Cup in 1977. Despite the establishment of the FIFA U-20 World Cup and later, FIFA U-17 World Cup, the Toulon Tournament remains important for youth football teams.

== Rules ==
The Toulon Tournament usually was played with two 40-minute halves. Many felt this to be weird so in 2019 they changed it to two periods of 45 minutes each. In a match, every team has eleven named substitutes and the maximum number of substitutions permitted is four.

In the knockout stage, if a game is tied at the end of regulation time, extra time is not played and a penalty shoot-out is used to determine the winner.

== Results ==
Edition	Year	Teams	Winners	Score	Runners-up	Third place	Score	Fourth place
1	1967 (Note: The 1967 edition was the first, and only, tournament not to feature national sides)	6	(Belgium) Anderlecht	1–0	(Czechoslovakia) Slovan Bratislava	No third place match		
2	1974	8	Poland	1–1*	Hungary	Czechoslovakia	3–2*	Brazil
3	1975 (Note: The 1975 edition was the first tournament to feature only national sides, which became the current format)	8	Argentina	1–0	France	Italy	2–0	Mexico
4	1976	8	Bulgaria	3–2	France	Mexico	2–1	Portugal
5	1977	8	France	1–0	Bulgaria	Netherlands	3–1	Hungary
6	1978	8	Hungary	4–3	France	Netherlands	2–1	Mexico
7	1979	8	Soviet Union	2–0	Netherlands	Hungary	2–0	France
8	1980	8	Brazil	2–1	France	Czechoslovakia	1–1	Soviet Union
9	1981	8	Brazil	2–0	Czechoslovakia	Soviet Union	0–0	France
10	1982	8	Yugoslavia	2–2	Czechoslovakia	Netherlands	1–1	East Germany
11	1983	8	Brazil	1–1	Argentina	France	0–0 (a.e.t.) (4–3 p)	Germany
12	1984	8	France	1–1	Soviet Union	Czechoslovakia	2–0	Netherlands
13	1985	8	France	3–1	England	Spain	1–0	Cameroon
14	1986	8	Bulgaria	1–0	France	Soviet Union	2–1	Portugal
15	1987	8	France	1–1	Bulgaria	Brazil	1–0	Soviet Union
16	1988	8	France	4–2	England	Bulgaria	1–1 (a.e.t.) (5–4 p)	Soviet Union
17	1989	8	France	3–0	Bulgaria	United States	2–0	England
18	1990	8	England	2–1	Czechoslovakia	Brazil	2–1	Portugal
19	1991	8	England	1–0	France	No third place match		
20	1992	8	Portugal	2–1	Yugoslavia	No third place match		
21	1993	8	England	1–0	France	No third place match		
22	1994	8	England	2–0	Portugal	No third place match		
23	1995	8	Brazil	1–0	France	No third place match		
24	1996	10	Brazil	1–1	France	No third place match		
25	1997	10	France	2–1	Portugal	No third place match		
26	1998	8	Argentina	2–0	France	Portugal	2–0	China
27	1999	8	Colombia	1–1 (a.e.t.) (6–5 p)	Argentina	France	3–2	Mexico
28	2000	8	Colombia	1–1 (asdet) (3–1 p)	Portugal	Italy	1–0	Ivory Coast
29	2001	8	Portugal	2–1	Colombia	France	2–0	Netherlands
30	2002	10	Brazil	2–0	Italy	Japan	0–0 (a.e.t.) (5–4 p)	England
31	2003	10	Portugal	3–1	Italy	Argentina	1–0	Mexico
32	2004	8	France	1–0	Sweden	China	1–0	Brazil
33	2005	8	France	4–1	Portugal	England	1–1 (a.e.t.) (3–2 p)	Mexico
34	2006	8	France	0–0 (a.e.t.) 5(5–3 p)	Netherlands	Portugal	1–0	China
35	2007	8	France	3–1	China	Ivory Coast	0–0 (a.e.t.) (5–4 p)	Portugal
36	2008	8	Italy	1–0	Chile	Ivory Coast	2–2 (a.e.t.) (4–3 p)	Japan
37	2009	8	Chile	1–0	France	Argentina	1–0	Netherlands
38	2010	8	Ivory Coast	3–2	Denmark	France	2–1	Chile
39	2011	8	Colombia	1–1 (a.e.t.) (3–1 p)	France	Italy	1–1 (a.e.t.) (5–4 p)	Mexico
40	2012	8	Mexico	3–0	Turkey	Netherlands	3–2	France
41	2013	10	Brazil	1–0	Colombia	France	2–1	Portugal
42	2014	10	Brazil	5–2	France	Portugal	1–0	England
43	2015	10	France	3–1	Morocco	United States	2–1	England
44	2016	10	England	2–1	France	Portugal	1–1 (a.e.t.) (4–2 p)	Czech Republic
45	2017	12	England	1–1 (a.e.t.) (5–3 p)	Ivory Coast	Scotland	3–0	Czech Republic
46	2018	12	England	2–1	Mexico	Turkey	0–0 (a.e.t.) (5–3 p)	Scotland
47	2019	12	Brazil	1–1 (a.e.t.) (5–5 p)	Japan	Mexico	0–0 (a.e.t.) (4–3 p)	Republic of Ireland
—	2020	Cancelled due to the COVID-19 pandemic in France. (Note: The 2020 tournament was scheduled to be held from 1 to 14 June but it was indefinitely postponed in April and cancelled on 24 October.) (Note: The 2021 tournament was scheduled to be held from 30 May to 13 June but it was indefinitely postponed in April and cancelled in November.)						
—	2021	Cancelled due to the COVID-19 pandemic in France.						
48	2022	12	France	2–1	Venezuela	Mexico	2–0	Colombia
49	2023	12	Panama	4–1	Mexico	Australia	2–0	France
50	2024	10	Ukraine	2–2 (5–4 p)	Ivory Coast	Italy	1–0	France
51	2025	8	France	3–1	Saudi Arabia	Denmark	2–1	Mexico
52	2026	10	Portugal	2–0	Tunisia	Ivory Coast	3–1	DR Congo

== Statistics ==
=== Performance by country ===
Team	Titles	Runners-up	Third place	Fourth place	Total
France	14 (1977, 1984, 1985, 1987, 1988, 1989, 1997, 2004, 2005, 2006, 2007, 2015, 2022, 2025)	14 (1975, 1976, 1978, 1980, 1986, 1991, 1993, 1995, 1996, 1998, 2009, 2011, 2014, 2016)	5 (1983, 1999, 2001, 2010, 2013)	5 (1979, 1981, 2012, 2023, 2024)	38
Brazil	9 (1980, 1981, 1983, 1995, 1996, 2002, 2013, 2014, 2019)		2 (1987, 1990)	2 (1974, 2004)	13
England	7 (1990, 1991, 1993, 1994, 2016, 2017, 2018)	2 (1985, 1988)	1 (2005)	4 (1989, 2002, 2014, 2015)	14
Portugal	4 (1992, 2001, 2003, 2026)	4 (1994, 1997, 2000, 2005)	4 (1998, 2006, 2014, 2016)	5 (1976, 1986, 1990, 2007, 2013)	17
Colombia	3 (1999, 2000, 2011)	2 (2001, 2013)		1 (2022)	6
Bulgaria	2 (1976, 1986)	3 (1977, 1987, 1989)	1 (1988)		6
Argentina	2 (1975, 1998)	2 (1983, 1999)	2 (2003, 2009)		6
Hungary	2 (1974*, 1978)		1 (1979)	1 (1977)	4
Italy	1 (2008)	2 (2002, 2003)	4 (1975, 2000, 2011, 2024)		7
Mexico	1 (2012)	2 (2018, 2023)	3 (1976, 2019, 2022)	7 (1975, 1978, 1999, 2003, 2005, 2011, 2025)	13
Soviet Union	1 (1979)	1 (1984)	2 (1981, 1986)	3 (1980, 1987, 1988)	7
Ivory Coast	1 (2010)	1 (2017, 2024)	3 (2007, 2008, 2026)	1 (2000)	6
Chile	1 (2009)	1 (2008)		1 (2010)	3
Serbia (Note: Includes Yugoslavia)	1 (1982)	1 (1992)			2
Poland	1 (1974*)				1
Belgium	1 (1967)				1
Panama	1 (2023)				1
Ukraine	1 (2024)				1
Czech Republic (Note: Includes Czechoslovakia)		4 (1967, 1981, 1982, 1990)	3 (1974, 1980, 1984)	2 (2016, 2017)	9
Netherlands		2 (1979, 2006)	4 (1977, 1978, 1982, 2012)	3 (1984, 2001, 2009)	9
China		1 (2007)	1 (2004)	2 (1998, 2006)	4
Japan		1 (2019)	1 (2002)	1 (2008)	3
Turkey		1 (2012)	1 (2018)		2
Denmark		1 (2010)	1 (2025)		2
Sweden		1 (2004)			1
Morocco		1 (2015)			1
Venezuela		1 (2022)			1
Saudi Arabia		1 (2025)			1
Tunisia		1 (2026)			1
United States			2 (1989, 2015)		2
Scotland			1 (2017)	1 (2018)	2
Spain			1 (1985)		1
Australia			1 (2023)		1
Germany (Note: Includes West and East Germany)				2 (1982, 1983)	2
Cameroon				1 (1985)	1
Republic of Ireland				1 (2019)	1
DR Congo				1 (2026)	1

=== Performance by confederation ===
Confederation	Titles	Runners-up
UEFA	31 (1974, 1976–1979, 1982, 1984–1994, 1997, 2001, 2003–2008, 2015–2018, 2022, 2024–2025)	36 (1967, 1975–1982, 1984–1998, 2000, 2002–2006, 2009–2012, 2014, 2016)
CONMEBOL	15 (1975, 1980–1981, 1983, 1995–1996, 1998–2000, 2002, 2009, 2011, 2013–2014, 2019)	6 (1983, 1999, 2001, 2008, 2013, 2022)
CONCACAF	2 (2012, 2023)	2 (2018, 2023)
CAF	1 (2010)	3 (2015, 2017, 2024)
AFC		3 (2007, 2019, 2025)

== Awards ==
Year	Top Goalscorer	Player of the Tournament	Best Goalkeeper
1967	(Czechoslovakia) Jozef Čapkovič (Note: Playing for Slovan Bratislava)	(Belgium) Jacques Teugels (Note: Playing for Anderlecht)	(Czechoslovakia) Augustín Ivančík
1974	(Hungary) József Sipőcz (4)	(Hungary) Tibor Nyilasi	(England) John Turner (Note: Playing for Derby County)
1975	(Hungary) András Törőcsik (2)	(Italy) Roberto Antonelli	(Hungary) József Kollár
1976	(Bulgaria) Radoslav Zdravkov (4)	(Bulgaria) Krasimir Manolov	(Bulgaria) Boris Manolkov
1977	(France) Gérard Soler (4)	(France) Gérard Soler	(Bulgaria) Boris Manolkov
1978	(Hungary) László P. Nagy (4)	(France) Henri Zambelli	(Mexico) Alberto Aguilar
1979	(Argentina) Sergio Fortunato (Netherlands) Roger Schouwenaar (3)	(Hungary) László Gyimesi	(Soviet Union) Valeri Novikov
1980	(Czechoslovakia) Lubomír Pokluda (4)	(France) José Touré	(Czechoslovakia) Luděk Mikloško
1981	(Italy) Sauro Fattori (3)	(Soviet Union) Vazha Zhvania	(Brazil) Marolla
1982	(Czechoslovakia) Stanislav Griga (France) Laurent Paganelli (4)	(East Germany) Rainer Ernst	(Czechoslovakia) Luděk Mikloško
1983	(Republic of Ireland) Eamonn O'Keefe (4)	(Brazil) Luvanor	(Soviet Union) Stanislav Rudenko
1984	(Algeria) Meziane Zaghzi (5)	(Soviet Union) Mikhail Rusiaev	(Soviet Union) Aleksandr Zhidkov
1985	(France) Jean-Pierre Papin (3)	(Cameroon) François Omam-Biyik	(France) Jean-Claude Nadon
1986	(Hungary) József Zvara (3)	(France) Jean-Luc Ribar	(Bulgaria) Ivko Ganchev
1987	(Bulgaria) Lyuboslav Penev (3)	(France) David Ginola	(Brazil) Taffarel
1988	(France) David Zitelli (6)	(England) Michael Thomas	(England) Nigel Martyn
1989	(Bulgaria) Petar Mihtarski (5)	(Bulgaria) Radko Kalaydzhiev	(France) Franck Chaumin (Note: Playing for INF Vichy)
1990	(England) Mark Robins (6)	(Czechoslovakia) Radim Nečas	(Czechoslovakia) Tomáš Bernady
1991	(England) Alan Shearer (7)	(England) Alan Shearer	(England) David James
1992	(Portugal) Rui Costa (4)	(Portugal) Rui Costa	(Socialist Federal Republic of Yugoslavia) Željko Cicović
1993	(France) Florian Maurice (4)	(France) Florian Maurice	(England) Paul Gerrard
1994	(Belgium) Bob Peeters (3)	(Belgium) Régis Genaux	(France) Grégory Coupet
1995	(France) Franck Histilloles (5)	(France) Vikash Dhorasoo	(Brazil) Fábio Noronha
1996	(Brazil) Adaílton (Portugal) Nuno Gomes (5)	(Brazil) Adaílton	(Brazil) Fábio Noronha
1997	(Colombia) Gustavo Victoria (France) Thierry Henry (Portugal) Carlitos (United States) Josh Wolff (3)	(France) Thierry Henry	(Portugal) Nuno Santos
1998	(Argentina) Francisco Guerrero (England) Emile Heskey (3)	(Argentina) Juan Román Riquelme	(Portugal) Nuno Santos
1999	(France) Peguy Luyindula (5)	(Argentina) Guillermo Pereyra	(Argentina) Sebastián Saja
2000	(Colombia) Tressor Moreno (5)	(Colombia) Tressor Moreno	(Portugal) Sérgio Leite
2001	(France) Djibril Cissé (Portugal) Lourenço (3)	(Colombia) Felipe Chará	(Colombia) Neco Martínez
2002	(Italy) Alessandro Pellicori (Japan) Satoshi Nakayama (3)	(Brazil) Pinga	(Brazil) Rubinho
2003	(Argentina) Germán Herrera (Italy) Francesco Ruopolo (Portugal) Lourenço (3)	(Argentina) Javier Mascherano	(Portugal) Bruno Vale
2004	(France) Bryan Bergougnoux (4)	(France) Rio Mavuba	(France) Jérémy Gavanon
2005	(Portugal) Vaz Tê (3)	(France) Arnold Mvuemba	(France) Steve Mandanda
2006	(France) David Gigliotti (3)	(France) Ricardo Faty	(France) Hugo Lloris
2007	(France) Kevin Gameiro (5)	(France) Kevin Gameiro	(Ivory Coast) Ibrahim Koné
2008	(Ivory Coast) Sekou Cissé (4)	(Italy) Sebastian Giovinco	(Italy) Davide Bassi
2009	(Argentina) Diego Buonanotte (Chile) Gerson Martínez (4)	(Argentina) Diego Buonanotte	(Argentina) Agustín Marchesín (Chile) Cristopher Toselli
2010	(Denmark) Nicki Bille Nielsen (5)	(Ivory Coast) Serges Déblé	(Denmark) Mikkel Andersen
2011	(France) Steeven Joseph-Monrose (5)	(Colombia) James Rodríguez	(France) Franck L'Hostis
2012	(Mexico) Marco Fabián (7)	(Mexico) Héctor Herrera	(Netherlands) Nick Marsman (Turkey) Ertuğrul Taşkıran
2013	(Brazil) Vinícius Araújo (Mexico) José Abella (Portugal) Aladje (3)	(Brazil) Yuri Mamute	(France) Zacharie Boucher
2014	(France) Jean-Christophe Bahebeck (4)	(Brazil) Rodrigo Caio	(France) Paul Nardi
2015	(France) Enzo Crivelli (Morocco) Achraf Bencharki (4)	(Morocco) Walid El Karti	(Morocco) Badreddine Benachour
2016	(England) Lewis Baker (4)	(England) Ruben Loftus-Cheek	(Portugal) Joel Pereira
2017	(Angola) Chico Banza (England) Harvey Barnes (England) George Hirst (4)	(England) David Brooks	(Wales) Luke Pilling
2018	(Mexico) Eduardo Aguirre (7)	(Mexico) Diego Lainez	(England) Freddie Woodman
2019	(Brazil) Matheus Cunha (4)	(Brazil) Douglas Luiz	(China) Chen Wei
2022	(France) Sékou Mara (5)	(Venezuela) Telasco Segovia	(Japan) Ryoya Kimura
2023	(France) Mathys Tel (Japan) Hisatsugu Ishii (Panama) Ángel Orelien (3)	(France) Eliesse Ben Seghir	(Ivory Coast) Mohamed Koné
2024	(Japan) Kento Shiogai (5)	(Ukraine) Maksym Khlan	(Ivory Coast) Yvann Konan
2025	(France) Steve Ngoura (5)	(France) Steve Ngoura	(Saudi Arabia) Osama Al-Mermesh
2026	(Portugal) João Rego (5)	(Portugal) João Rego	(Tunisia) Anas Khardani

== See also ==
- Sud Ladies Cup
- Montaigu Tournament
- Lafarge Foot Avenir
- Torneo di Viareggio
- Granatkin Memorial
- Valeriy Lobanovskyi Memorial Tournament
- Under-20 Four Nations Tournament
- Under 20 Elite League
- UEFA Youth League
- Premier League International Cup
- NextGen Series
- Under-20 Intercontinental Cup
- U-20 Copa Libertadores
- Granatkin Memorial
- Valeriy Lobanovskyi Memorial Tournament
- Ramón de Carranza Trophy
- Inter-Cities Fairs Cup
- UEFA Amateur Cup
- Telki Cup - (CRO M U17)
- CIS Cup - (RUS M U21)
- Garuda Championship Series - (INA M U17)
- Srikandi Merdeka Cup - (INA W U17)
- UEFA Under-16 Development Tournament
- UEFA Under-19 Development Tournament
- UEFA Women's Under-16 Development Tournament
- UEFA Women's Under-19 Development Tournament
- United Tournament
- Channel One Cup (football)
- Panda Cup
- UEFA Regions' Cup
- International Norte Alentejano Tournament
- Youth Development Cup (Belarus)
- International Kuban Spring Women U-19 Tournament
- "Coppa delle Nazioni - Wikipedia". it.wikipedia.org.
- Torneo delle Nazioni
- Vlatko Marković International Tournament
- U-16 International Dream Cup
