= Padilla, Cauca =

Coordinates: 3°14′N 76°19′W

- Municipality and town
- Flag Coat of arms

- Location of the municipality and town of Padilla, Cauca in the Cauca Department of Colombia.
- Country: Colombia
- Department: Cauca Department

Area
  - Municipality and town: 100 km^{2} (39 sq mi)
- Elevation: 849 m (2,785 ft)

Population (2018)
  - Municipality and town: 9,937
  - Density: 99/km^{2} (260/sq mi)
  - Urban: 4,111
- Time zone: UTC-5 (Colombia Standard Time)
- Climate: Am
- Website: padilla-cauca.gov.co

Padilla is a town and municipality in the Cauca Department, in Southwestern Colombia. Tourist attractions in and around the area include San Antonio gardens.
