= João Rego =

Portuguese footballer

Personal information
- Full name: João Pedro Seno Luís Rego
- Date of birth: 20 June 2005 (age 21)
- Place of birth: Ourique, Portugal
- Height: 1.83 m (6 ft 0 in)
- Position: Attacking midfielder

Team information
- Current team: Casa Pia (on loan from Benfica)
- Number: 70

Youth career
- 2012–2018: Ourique
- 2018–2023: Benfica

Senior career*
Years	Team	Apps	(Gls)
2023–	Benfica B	60	(7)
2024–	Benfica	12	(1)
2026–	→ Casa Pia (loan)	2	(0)

International career^{‡}
2021–2022	Portugal U17	7	(1)
2022–2023	Portugal U18	9	(2)
2023–2024	Portugal U19	11	(3)
2024–	Portugal U20	15	(7)
2025–	Portugal U21	1	(0)
- * Club domestic league appearances and goals as of 6 September 2026 ‡ National team caps and goals as of 13 June 2026

João Pedro Seno Luís Rego (born 20 June 2005) is a Portuguese professional footballer who plays as an attacking midfielder for Primeira Liga club Casa Pia on loan from Benfica.

== Club career ==
Rego is a youth product of Ourique, before moving to Benfica's youth academy in 2018. On 18 February 2021, he signed his first professional contract with Benfica at the age of 16. On 8 May 2023, he extended his contract with the club and was promoted to their reserves. He made his professional debut with Benfica B as a late substitute in a 1–1 Liga Portugal 2 tie with Leixões on 3 September 2023. On 27 September 2023, he signed his first professional contract with Benfica until 2028.

== International career ==
Rego is a youth international for Portugal. He has played up to the Portugal U19s.

== Career statistics ==
=== Club ===
As of match played 28 January 2026

Appearances and goals by club, season and competition
Club	Season	League			Taça de Portugal		Taça da Liga		Europe		Other		Total	
Club	Season	Division	Apps	Goals	Apps	Goals	Apps	Goals	Apps	Goals	Apps	Goals	Apps	Goals
Benfica B	2023–24	Liga Portugal 2	26	2	—		—		—		—		26	2
Benfica B	2024–25	Liga Portugal 2	18	4	—		—		—		—		18	4
Benfica B	2025–26	Liga Portugal 2	4	0	—		—		—		—		4	0
Benfica B	Total		48	6	—		—		—		—		48	6
Benfica	2023–24	Primeira Liga	1	0	0	0	0	0	0	0	0	0	1	0
Benfica	2024–25	Primeira Liga	3	0	3	1	1	0	4 (Note: Appearances in UEFA Champions League)	0	2 (Note: Appearances in FIFA Club World Cup)	0	13	1
Benfica	2025–26	Primeira Liga	8	1	3	0	1	0	2	0	0	0	14	1
Benfica	Total		12	1	6	1	2	0	6	0	2	0	28	2
Career total			60	7	6	1	2	0	6	0	2	0	76	8

== Honours ==
Benfica

- Taça da Liga: 2024–25
