= Stade de Bon Rencontre =

Stadium in Toulon, France

- Location within France
- Address: Stade Bon Rencontre; 3, avenue Aristide-Briand; 83000 Toulon
- Coordinates: 43.126°N 5.902°E
- Capacity: 8,200

Tenants
- Sporting Toulon Var

The Bon Rencontre stadium is the second stadium of Toulon behind the Mayol Stadium. It seats 8,200 seated spectators and is currently used by the football club Sporting Toulon Var.

The stadium of Bon Rencontre has three stands: stand Mouraille, stand Depallens and stand Borrelli.

Each stand hosts supporter groups: respectively the Indomitable Toulon 1993 at D block of the grandstand Mouraille, the TNT and the Association of Supporters at blocks D and C of the stand Depallens and Fedelissimi Toulon 1998 in the Borrelli stand. The stadium also has a parking lot for the opposing fans lying behind the goals (former South grandstand), which has no steps and is composed of clay.

== The main achievements carried out between 2002 and 2005 ==
=== The achievements made in 2002 ===
- Repair of floors of the western grandstand
- Water supply works
- Paintings
- Depallens grandstand seats (1^{re} slice)

=== The achievements made in 2003 ===
- Compliance of irrigation system
- Paintings entrances, portals and other
- Scoreboard
- Depallens grandstand seats (2 slice)

=== The achievements made in 2004 ===
- North Stand Emergency control
- Depallens grandstand seats (continued)
- Demolition of the South Gallery + pylon
- Installing new sound system
- Paint work
- Masonry work (fixing cracked walls)
- Sealing work

=== The achievements made in 2005 ===
- VMC works (mechanical ventilation) in the locker room of players
- Safety work, including portals
- Visitors locker room work (1^{re} slice)
- Depallens stand seats in the grandstand (end)

=== The achievements made in 2008-2009 ===
- Borrelli grandstand seats, enlargement of the lower stairs
- Grandstand seats for Mouraille stand
- Construction of Depallens stand refreshment booth.
