= 2019–20 Atlético de Rafaela season =

Atlético de Rafaela
2019–20 season
- President: Eduardo Gays
- Manager: Walter Otta
- Stadium: Estadio Nuevo Monumental
- Top goalscorer: League: Lucas Blondel (2); All: Lucas Blondel (2)

The 2019–20 season is Atlético de Rafaela's 3rd consecutive season in the second division of Argentine football, Primera B Nacional.

The season generally covers the period from 1 July 2019 to 30 June 2020.

== Review ==
=== Pre-season ===
Three departures were confirmed before 25 June, as Mauro Albertengo, Gastón Suso, Matías Quiroga and Nicolás Toloza left for Agropecuario, Platense, Defensores de Belgrano and Defensores Unidos respectively. Numerous loans from the past campaign officially ended on/around 30 June. Atlético de Rafaela confirmed the signings of eight new players on 3 July: Joaquín Quinteros (Mitre), Renso Pérez (Central Córdoba), Júnior Mendieta (Lanús), Ijiel Protti (Villa Dálmine), Franco Racca (Chacarita Juniors), Ignacio Liporace (Brown), Leonardo Acosta (Almagro) and Alan Bonansea (Lanús). Goalkeeper Ramiro Macagno and winger Marco Borgnino departed on loan on 5/8 July, moving to Newell's Old Boys and Nacional. Abel Masuero was signed by Quilmes on 9 July.

On 13/16 July, Rafaela played friendly matches with Unión Santa Fe Reserves and River Plate Reserves, going unbeaten as they gained three victories. They, on 17 July, announced a trio of incomings in Alexis Niz (centre-back), Maximiliano Paredes (right-back - loan) and Nereo Fernández (goalkeeper) from Tigre, Chacarita Juniors and Unión Santa Fe respectively. Marcelo Guzmán headed off to Santamarina on 16 July. Ezequiel Montagna went to Tigre on 17 July. Consecutive draws were played out with Newell's Old Boys on 20 July. Rafaela lost back-to-back to newly-promoted Primera B Nacional team Estudiantes of Río Cuarto; a day after an encounter with Atlético San Jorge was cancelled. Also on 24 July, Reinaldo Alderete departed for Agropecuario.

Facundo Soloa completed a loan move to Guillermo Brown on 25 July. Rafaela failed to gain a victory across two friendlies with Torneo Federal A's Sportivo Belgrano on 27 July. 30 July saw Denis Stracqualursi sign from Aldosivi. On 1 August, Rafaela held a rematch with Estudiantes (RC) - this time in Río Cuarto, where they'd win by three goals to zero. Facundo Britos and Stefano Brundo were revealed as new signings on 12 August.

=== August ===
Rafaela travelled to Adrogué on 17 August to face Brown in Primera B Nacional, coming away with a point after Alan Bonansea had given them the lead. Rafaela fell to defeat in game two in the league, as Tigre took away the points from the Estadio Nuevo Monumental on 23 August. Rafaela and Defensores de Belgrano played out a 2–2 tie in Buenos Aires on 31 August, with Lucas Blondel scoring for the second match running.

== Squad ==
Squad No.	Nationality	Name	Position(s)	Date of birth (age)	Signed from
Goalkeepers
	Argentina	Nereo Fernández	GK	13 April 1979 (age 47)	Unión Santa Fe
	Argentina	Nahuel Pezzini	GK	13 November 1996 (age 29)	Academy
	Argentina	Matías Tagliamonte	GK	19 February 1998 (age 28)	Academy
Defenders
	Argentina	Tomás Baroni	CB	25 May 1995 (age 31)	Academy
	Argentina	Lucas Blondel	RB	14 September 1996 (age 30)	Academy
	Argentina	Stefano Brundo	CB	19 May 1993 (age 33)	Gimnasia y Esgrima
	Argentina	Nazareno Fernández Colombo	CB	12 January 1997 (age 29)	Platense
	Argentina	Ignacio Liporace	LB	10 April 1992 (age 34)	Brown
	Argentina	Alexis Niz	CB	15 May 1988 (age 38)	Tigre
	Argentina	Maximiliano Paredes	RB	26 March 1991 (age 35)	Chacarita Juniors (loan)
	Argentina	Franco Racca	DF	15 January 1992 (age 34)	Chacarita Juniors (loan)
	Argentina	Roque Ramírez	LB	16 August 1999 (age 27)	Academy
	Uruguay	Sergio Rodríguez	CB	5 January 1985 (age 41)	Independiente Rivadavia
Midfielders
	Argentina	Reinaldo Alderete	CM	17 January 1983 (age 43)	Agropecuario
	Argentina	Enzo Bertero	MF	31 May 1996 (age 30)	Ben Hur
	Argentina	Facundo Britos	CM	5 June 1996 (age 30)	Unión Santa Fe
	Argentina	Mateo Castellano	DM	12 March 1996 (age 30)	Ben Hur
	Argentina	Enzo Copetti	RW	16 January 1996 (age 30)	Academy
	Argentina	Gianfranco Ferrero	AM	6 June 1995 (age 31)	Academy
	Argentina	Enzo Gaggi	RM	14 January 1998 (age 28)	Academy
	Argentina	Yoel Holhman	MF	11 March 1999 (age 27)	Academy
	Argentina	Ángelo Martino	MF	5 June 1998 (age 28)	Academy
	Argentina	Júnior Mendieta	MF	13 June 1993 (age 33)	Lanús
	Argentina	Diego Meza	AM	27 April 1999 (age 27)	Academy
	Uruguay	Agustín Nadruz	CM	29 June 1996 (age 30)	Boston River
	Argentina	Lautaro Navas	CM	30 April 1996 (age 30)	Academy
	Argentina	Renso Pérez	RM	24 December 1987 (age 38)	Central Córdoba
	Argentina	Luciano Pogonza	LM	20 March 1999 (age 27)	Academy
	Argentina	Alfredo Pussetto	AM	2 October 1994 (age 32)	Academy
	Uruguay	Emiliano Romero	MF	30 September 1992 (age 34)	Juventud
	Argentina	Matías Valdivia	MF	21 September 1996 (age 30)	Academy
Forwards
	Argentina	Leonardo Acosta	FW	17 April 1989 (age 37)	Almagro
	Argentina	Alan Bonansea	FW	6 May 1996 (age 30)	Lanús
	Argentina	Juan Cruz Esquivel	FW	22 August 2000 (age 26)	Academy
	Argentina	Matías Godoy	FW	10 January 2002 (age 24)	Academy
	Argentina	Mauro Marconato	LW	30 May 1996 (age 30)	Colón
	Argentina	Federico Ortíz	FW	24 February 1999 (age 27)	Academy
	Argentina	Ijiel Protti	CF	31 January 1995 (age 31)	Villa Dálmine
	Argentina	Joaquín Quinteros	LW	11 March 1992 (age 34)	Mitre
	Argentina	Denis Stracqualursi	CF	20 October 1987 (age 39)	Aldosivi
Out on loan					Loaned to
	Argentina	Marco Borgnino	LW	25 October 1997 (age 29)	Nacional
	Argentina	Ramiro Macagno	GK	18 March 1997 (age 29)	Newell's Old Boys
	Argentina	Facundo Soloa	CM	4 November 1996 (age 30)	Guillermo Brown

== Transfers ==
Domestic transfer windows:
3 July 2019 to 24 September 2019
20 January 2020 to 19 February 2020.

=== Transfers in ===
Date from	Position	Nationality	Name	From	Ref.
3 July 2019	LW	Argentina	Joaquín Quinteros	Mitre	
3 July 2019	RM	Argentina	Renso Pérez	Central Córdoba	
3 July 2019	MF	Argentina	Júnior Mendieta	Lanús	
3 July 2019	CF	Argentina	Ijiel Protti	Villa Dálmine	
3 July 2019	LB	Argentina	Ignacio Liporace	Brown	
3 July 2019	FW	Argentina	Leonardo Acosta	Almagro	
3 July 2019	FW	Argentina	Alan Bonansea	Lanús	
16 July 2019	CB	Argentina	Alexis Niz	Tigre	
16 July 2019	GK	Argentina	Nereo Fernández	Unión Santa Fe	
24 July 2019	CM	Argentina	Reinaldo Alderete	Agropecuario	
30 July 2019	CF	Argentina	Denis Stracqualursi	Aldosivi	
12 August 2019	CM	Argentina	Facundo Britos	Unión Santa Fe	
12 August 2019	CB	Argentina	Stefano Brundo	Gimnasia y Esgrima	

=== Transfers out ===
Date from	Position	Nationality	Name	To	Ref.
3 July 2019 (Note: Deal agreed on 11 June 2019)	FW	Argentina	Mauro Albertengo	Agropecuario	
3 July 2019 (Note: Deal agreed on 14 June 2019)	CB	Argentina	Gastón Suso	Platense	
3 July 2019 (Note: Deal agreed on 17 June 2019)	CF	Argentina	Matías Quiroga	Defensores de Belgrano	
3 July 2019 (Note: Deal agreed on 24 June 2019)	FW	Argentina	Nicolás Toloza	Defensores Unidos	
9 July 2019	CB	Argentina	Abel Masuero	Quilmes	
16 July 2019	CM	Argentina	Marcelo Guzmán	Santamarina	
17 July 2019	LW	Argentina	Ezequiel Montagna	Tigre	

=== Loans in ===
Start date	Position	Nationality	Name	From	End date	Ref.
3 July 2019	DF	Argentina	Franco Racca	Chacarita Juniors	30 June 2020	
16 July 2019	RB	Argentina	Maximiliano Paredes	Chacarita Juniors	30 June 2020	

=== Loans out ===
Start date	Position	Nationality	Name	To	End date	Ref.
5 July 2019	GK	Argentina	Ramiro Macagno	Newell's Old Boys	30 June 2020	
8 July 2019	LW	Argentina	Marco Borgnino	Nacional	30 June 2020	
25 July 2019	CM	Argentina	Facundo Soloa	Guillermo Brown	30 June 2020	

== Friendlies ==
=== Pre-season ===
Atlético de Rafaela had a friendly with Primera División side Newell's Old Boys scheduled on 27 June. Before that, they'd face the reserve teams of Primera División duo Unión Santa Fe and River Plate. Friendlies with Sportivo Belgrano and an as yet unknown opponent, later revealed as Estudiantes (RC), were also scheduled.

Win Draw Loss

13 July 2019 Friendly	Atlético de Rafaela	2–0	Unión Santa Fe Reserves	Rafaela, Argentina
	F. Racca; R. Pérez	Atlético de Rafaela; Mundo Ascenso; 45 min. match		Stadium: Estadio Nuevo Monumental

13 July 2019 Friendly	Atlético de Rafaela	1–0	Unión Santa Fe Reserves	Rafaela, Argentina
	L. Acosta	Atlético de Rafaela; Mundo Ascenso; 45 min. match		Stadium: Estadio Nuevo Monumental

16 July 2019 Friendly	Atlético de Rafaela	1–0	River Plate Reserves	San Jorge, Argentina
	A. Bonansea	Atlético de Rafaela; Mundo Ascenso; 45 min. match		Stadium: Estadio Parque 23 de Junio

16 July 2019 Friendly	Atlético de Rafaela	0–0	River Plate Reserves	San Jorge, Argentina
		Atlético de Rafaela; Mundo Ascenso; 45 min. match		Stadium: Estadio Parque 23 de Junio

20 July 2019 Friendly	Newell's Old Boys	0–0	Atlético de Rafaela	Rosario, Argentina
		Atlético de Rafaela; Diario La Opinión; 60 min. match		Stadium: Centro de Entrenamiento Jorge Griffa

20 July 2019 Friendly	Newell's Old Boys	1–1	Atlético de Rafaela	Rosario, Argentina
	A. Rodríguez	Atlético de Rafaela; Diario La Opinión	M. Godoy	Stadium: Centro de Entrenamiento Jorge Griffa

23 July 2019 Friendly	Atlético de Rafaela	Cancelled	Atlético San Jorge	Rafaela, Argentina

24 July 2019 Friendly	Atlético de Rafaela	0–1	Estudiantes (RC)	Rafaela, Argentina
		Atlético de Rafaela; Mundo D - La Voz; 70 min. match	I. Hesar	Stadium: Estadio Nuevo Monumental

24 July 2019 Friendly	Atlético de Rafaela	0–2	Estudiantes (RC)	Rafaela, Argentina
		Atlético de Rafaela; Mundo D - La Voz; 70 min. match	F. Pérez; J. Ferreira	Stadium: Estadio Nuevo Monumental

27 July 2019 Friendly	Atlético de Rafaela	0–0	Sportivo Belgrano	Rafaela, Argentina
		Atlético de Rafaela; El Periódico		Stadium: Autódromo Ciudad de Rafaela

27 July 2019 Friendly	Atlético de Rafaela	0–1	Sportivo Belgrano	Rafaela, Argentina
		Atlético de Rafaela; El Periódico	E. Avaro	Stadium: Autódromo Ciudad de Rafaela

1 August 2019 Friendly	Estudiantes (RC)	0–3	Atlético de Rafaela	Río Cuarto, Argentina
		Atlético de Rafaela; Mundo D - La Voz	I. Protti 3'; A. Bonansea 49'; M. Godoy 73'	Stadium: Estadio Antonio Candini; Referee: Federico Drubi (Argentina)

== Competitions ==
=== Primera B Nacional ===
==== Results summary ====
Overall								Home						Away					
Pld	W	D	L	GF	GA	GD	Pts	W	D	L	GF	GA	GD	W	D	L	GF	GA	GD
2	0	1	1	2	3	−1	1	0	0	1	1	2	−1	0	1	0	1	1	0

Last updated: 24 August 2019.
Source: Soccerway

==== Matches ====
The fixtures for the 2019–20 league season were announced on 1 August 2019, with a new format of split zones being introduced. Atlético de Rafaela were drawn in Zone B.

Win Draw Loss

17 August 2019 1	Brown	1–1	Atlético de Rafaela	Adrogué, Argentina
12:00 GMT-3	A. Stegman 82'	Brown; Grupo La Provincia; Soccerway	A. Bonansea 45'	Stadium: Estadio Lorenzo Arandilla; Referee: Julio Barraza (Argentina)

23 August 2019 2	Atlético de Rafaela	1–2	Tigre	Rafaela, Argentina
19:05 GMT-3	L. Blondel 73'	Atlético de Rafaela; Grupo La Provincia; Soccerway	I. Canuto 45+1'; W. Montillo 61'	Stadium: Estadio Nuevo Monumental; Referee: Jorge Baliño (Argentina)

31 August 2019 3	Defensores de Belgrano	2–2	Atlético de Rafaela	Buenos Aires, Argentina
15:30 GMT-3	M. Quiroga 9'; E. Aguirre 90+6' (pen.)	Atlético de Rafaela; Diario La Opinión; Soccerway	L. Blondel 79'; J. Quinteros 90+1'	Stadium: Estadio Juan Pasquale; Referee: Maximiliano Ramírez (Argentina)

9 September 2019 4	Atlético de Rafaela	–	Quilmes	Rafaela, Argentina
21:05 GMT-3				Stadium: Estadio Nuevo Monumental

== Squad statistics ==
=== Appearances and goals ===
No.	Pos.	Nationality	Name	League		Cup		League Cup		Continental		Other		Total		Discipline		Ref
No.	Pos.	Nationality	Name	Apps	Goals	Apps	Goals	Apps	Goals	Apps	Goals	Apps	Goals	Apps	Goals	Yellow card	Red card	Ref
–	GK	Argentina	Nereo Fernández	3	0	—		—		—		0	0	3	0	0	0	
–	GK	Argentina	Ramiro Macagno	0	0	—		—		—		0	0	0	0	0	0	
–	GK	Argentina	Nahuel Pezzini	0	0	—		—		—		0	0	0	0	0	0	
–	GK	Argentina	Matías Tagliamonte	0	0	—		—		—		0	0	0	0	0	0	
–	CB	Argentina	Tomás Baroni	0	0	—		—		—		0	0	0	0	0	0	
–	RB	Argentina	Lucas Blondel	3	2	—		—		—		0	0	3	2	2	0	
–	CB	Argentina	Stefano Brundo	0	0	—		—		—		0	0	0	0	0	0	
–	CB	Argentina	Nazareno Fernández Colombo	0	0	—		—		—		0	0	0	0	0	0	
–	LB	Argentina	Ignacio Liporace	3	0	—		—		—		0	0	3	0	0	0	
–	CB	Argentina	Alexis Niz	0(1)	0	—		—		—		0	0	0(1)	0	0	0	
–	RB	Argentina	Maximiliano Paredes	1	0	—		—		—		0	0	1	0	0	0	
–	DF	Argentina	Franco Racca	3	0	—		—		—		0	0	3	0	1	0	
–	LB	Argentina	Roque Ramírez	0	0	—		—		—		0	0	0	0	0	0	
–	CB	Uruguay	Sergio Rodríguez	3	0	—		—		—		0	0	3	0	2	0	
–	CM	Argentina	Reinaldo Alderete	0(1)	0	—		—		—		0	0	0(1)	0	0	0	
–	MF	Argentina	Enzo Bertero	0	0	—		—		—		0	0	0	0	0	0	
–	CM	Argentina	Facundo Britos	0	0	—		—		—		0	0	0	0	0	0	
–	DM	Argentina	Mateo Castellano	0	0	—		—		—		0	0	0	0	0	0	
–	RW	Argentina	Enzo Copetti	1	0	—		—		—		0	0	1	0	0	0	
–	AM	Argentina	Gianfranco Ferrero	0	0	—		—		—		0	0	0	0	0	0	
–	RM	Argentina	Enzo Gaggi	0	0	—		—		—		0	0	0	0	0	0	
–	MF	Argentina	Yoel Holhman	0	0	—		—		—		0	0	0	0	0	0	
–	MF	Argentina	Júnior Mendieta	1	0	—		—		—		0	0	1	0	0	0	
–	MF	Argentina	Ángelo Martino	3	0	—		—		—		0	0	3	0	1	0	
–	AM	Argentina	Diego Meza	0	0	—		—		—		0	0	0	0	0	0	
–	CM	Uruguay	Agustín Nadruz	0	0	—		—		—		0	0	0	0	0	0	
–	CM	Argentina	Lautaro Navas	0	0	—		—		—		0	0	0	0	0	0	
–	RM	Argentina	Renso Pérez	3	0	—		—		—		0	0	3	0	0	0	
–	LM	Argentina	Luciano Pogonza	0	0	—		—		—		0	0	0	0	0	0	
–	AM	Argentina	Alfredo Pussetto	0	0	—		—		—		0	0	0	0	0	0	
–	MF	Uruguay	Emiliano Romero	3	0	—		—		—		0	0	3	0	1	0	
–	CM	Argentina	Facundo Soloa	0	0	—		—		—		0	0	0	0	0	0	
–	MF	Argentina	Matías Valdivia	0	0	—		—		—		0	0	0	0	0	0	
–	FW	Argentina	Juan Cruz Esquivel	0	0	—		—		—		0	0	0	0	0	0	
–	FW	Argentina	Leonardo Acosta	0	0	—		—		—		0	0	0	0	0	0	
–	FW	Argentina	Alan Bonansea	3	1	—		—		—		0	0	3	1	0	0	
–	LW	Argentina	Marco Borgnino	0	0	—		—		—		0	0	0	0	0	0	
–	FW	Argentina	Matías Godoy	0(2)	0	—		—		—		0	0	0(2)	0	0	0	
–	LW	Argentina	Mauro Marconato	0(1)	0	—		—		—		0	0	0(1)	0	0	0	
–	FW	Argentina	Federico Ortíz	0	0	—		—		—		0	0	0	0	0	0	
–	CF	Argentina	Ijiel Protti	3	0	—		—		—		0	0	3	0	0	0	
–	LW	Argentina	Joaquín Quinteros	0(3)	1	—		—		—		0	0	0(3)	1	0	0	
–	CF	Argentina	Denis Stracqualursi	0(1)	0	—		—		—		0	0	0(1)	0	0	0	
Own goals				—	0	—		—		—		—	0	—	0	—	—	—

Statistics accurate as of 3 September 2019.

=== Goalscorers ===
Rank	Pos	No.	Nat	Name	League	Cup	League Cup	Continental	Other	Total	Ref
1	RB	–	Argentina	Lucas Blondel	2	0	—	—	0	2	
2	FW	–	Argentina	Alan Bonansea	1	0	—	—	0	1	
2	LW	–	Argentina	Joaquín Quinteros	1	0	—	—	0	1	
Own goals					0	0	—	—	0	0	
Totals					4	0	—	—	0	4	—
