= Lautaro Navas =

Argentine footballer

Personal information
- Date of birth: 30 April 1996 (age 30)
- Place of birth: Rafaela, Argentina
- Position: Midfielder

Youth career
- Atlético de Rafaela

Senior career*
Years	Team	Apps	(Gls)
2017–2020	Atlético de Rafaela	10	(0)
2019–2020	→ Sportivo Las Parejas (loan)	7	(0)
2021–2022	Estudiantes Unidos		
- * Club domestic league appearances and goals as of 20:44, 25 September 2020 (UTC)

Lautaro Navas (born 30 April 1996) is an Argentine professional footballer who plays as a midfielder.

== Career ==
Navas started his career in the ranks of Atlético de Rafaela. He was an unused substitute in the club's final match of the 2016–17 Argentine Primera División against fellow relegated team Sarmiento, which preceded his professional debut arriving in Primera B Nacional on 18 February 2018 during a victory away to Ferro Carril Oeste. Navas was selected three more times in the 2017–18 campaign. Navas spent 2019–20 out on loan in Torneo Federal A with Sportivo Las Parejas. Nine total appearances followed.

In November 2020, 24-year old Navas decided to retire, due to alleged personal reasons and "lack of happiness" when playing, which led him to "hang up his boots." However, in October 2021, Navas returned to the pitch, after signing with Argentine amateur club Estudiantes Unidos de Bariloche.

== Career statistics ==
As of 25 November 2018.

Club statistics
Club	Season	League			Cup		League Cup		Continental		Other		Total	
Club	Season	Division	Apps	Goals	Apps	Goals	Apps	Goals	Apps	Goals	Apps	Goals	Apps	Goals
Atlético de Rafaela	2016–17	Primera División	0	0	0	0	—		—		0	0	0	0
Atlético de Rafaela	2017–18	Primera B Nacional	3	0	0	0	—		—		1 (Note: Appearance(s) in the Primera B Nacional play-offs)	0	4	0
Atlético de Rafaela	2018–19	Primera B Nacional	7	0	1	0	—		—		0	0	8	0
Atlético de Rafaela	2019–20	Primera B Nacional	0	0	0	0	—		—		0	0	0	0
Atlético de Rafaela	Total		10	0	1	0	—		—		1	0	12	0
Sportivo Las Parejas (loan)	2019–20	Torneo Federal A	7	0	2	0	—		—		0	0	9	0
Career total			17	0	3	0	—		—		1	0	21	0
