= Gaggi =

Gaggi may refer to:

== People ==
- Alice Gaggi (born 1987), Italian mountain runner
- Anthony Gaggi (1925–1988), American criminal
- Enzo Gaggi (born 1998), Argentinian football player

== Places ==
- Gaggi, Sicily, Italy
