= Ignacio Pussetto =

Argentine footballer

Personal information
- Full name: Ignacio Pussetto
- Date of birth: 21 December 1995 (age 30)
- Place of birth: Cañada Rosquín, Santa Fe, Argentina
- Height: 1.80 m (5 ft 11 in)
- Positions: Winger; forward

Team information
- Current team: Huracán (on loan from Independiente)
- Number: 23

Youth career
- Juventud Unida
- 2011–2013: Atlético de Rafaela

Senior career*
Years	Team	Apps	(Gls)
2013–2016	Atlético de Rafaela	44	(4)
2016–2018	Huracán	42	(11)
2018–2020	Udinese	47	(5)
2020–2023	Watford	8	(0)
2020–2022	→ Udinese (loan)	39	(7)
2022–2023	→ Sampdoria (loan)	5	(0)
2023–2024	Huracán	30	(11)
2024–2025	UNAM	32	(8)
2025–	Independiente	22	(1)
2026–	→ Huracán (loan)	9	(1)
- * Club domestic league appearances and goals as of 16:48, 12 August 2026 (UTC)

Ignacio Pussetto (born 21 December 1995) is an Argentine professional footballer who plays as a winger or forward for Argentine Primera División club Huracán, on loan from Independiente.

== Club career ==
=== Atlético de Rafaela ===
Born in Cañada Rosquín, Santa Fe, Argentina, Pussetto began his career in the youth ranks of local club Juventud Unida before joining Atlético de Rafaela in 2011. In 2013, Pussetto made his professional debut for Atlético de Rafaela in the Argentine Primera División. On 1 June 2015, Pussetto scored his first goal with Rafaela in a 3–2 loss to Huracán. On 30 August 2015, Pussetto scored the lone goal for Rafaela in a 1–0 victory over Sarmiento de Junin.

=== Huracán ===
On 18 July 2016, Pussetto was sold to fellow Argentine side Huracán for $1.4 million, after rejecting offers from Atlético Vélez Sarsfield and Unión de Santa Fe. On 29 October 2016, Pussetto scored his first goal for Huracán in a 1–1 draw with Rosario Central. On 11 September 2017, Pussetto led his club to a 1–0 victory over Newell's Old Boys, scoring the lone goal of the match. The following week, on 18 September, Pussetto scored two goals for Huracán in a 3–1 victory over Gimnasia y Esgrima La Plata at Estadio Juan Carmelo Zerillo, the first victory for Huracán in that venue in 31 years.

=== Udinese ===
On 17 July 2018, Pussetto moved to Italy, signing with Serie A club Udinese for a fee of around €8 million.

=== Watford ===
On 14 January 2020, Pussetto signed a four-and-a-half-year deal with English Premier League side Watford for £7 million.

On 5 October 2020, Pussetto returned to Udinese on a season-long loan. On 30 June 2021, the loan to Udinese was extended for the 2021–22 season.

On 1 September 2022, Pussetto joined fellow Italian side Sampdoria on a season-long loan deal with an obligation to buy. He also signed a provisional contract with Sampdoria until 2026, which would have been in effect if Sampdoria exercised their purchase option.

On 16 August 2023, Watford terminated Pussetto's contract by mutual agreement.

=== Pumas UNAM ===
On 18 July 2024, Pussetto signed for Mexican club Pumas UNAM from Huracán, where he had previously resigned for after leaving Watford in 2023.

=== Independiente ===
On 10 July 2025, Pussetto returned to Argentina to sign for Independiente, signing a contract until 2027.

== Personal life ==
Pussetto's older brother, Alfredo, is also a professional footballer.

== Career statistics ==
As of match played 22 May 2022

Appearances and goals by club, season and competition
Club	Season	League			National cup (Note: Includes Copa Argentina, Supercopa Argentina)		Continental (Note: Includes Copa Libertadores, Copa Sudamericana)		Total	
Club	Season	Division	Apps	Goals	Apps	Goals	Apps	Goals	Apps	Goals
Atlético de Rafaela	2012–13	Argentine Primera División	—		1	0	—		1	0
Atlético de Rafaela	2013–14	Argentine Primera División	11	0	0	0	—		11	1
Atlético de Rafaela	2014	Argentine Primera División	3	0	0	0	—		3	0
Atlético de Rafaela	2015	Argentine Primera División	19	2	2	0	—		21	2
Atlético de Rafaela	2016	Argentine Primera División	11	2	1	0	—		12	2
Atlético de Rafaela	Total		44	4	4	0	—		48	4
Huracán	2016–17	Argentine Primera División	15	2	3	0	3	0	21	2
Huracán	2017–18	Argentine Primera División	27	9	1	0	—		28	9
Huracán	Total		42	11	4	0	3	0	49	11
Udinese	2018–19	Serie A	35	4	1	0	—		36	4
Udinese	2019–20	Serie A	12	1	2	0	—		14	1
Udinese	Total		47	5	3	0	—		50	5
Watford	2019–20	Premier League	7	0	0	0	—		7	0
Watford	2020–21	Championship	1	0	1	0	—		2	0
Watford	Total		8	0	1	0	—		9	0
Udinese (loan)	2020–21	Serie A	11	3	2	1	—		13	4
Udinese (loan)	2021–22	Serie A	28	4	3	2	—		31	6
Udinese (loan)	Total		39	7	5	3	—		44	10
Career total			180	27	17	3	3	0	200	30
