= Juan Esquivel =

Juan Esquivel may refer to:

- Juan Esquivel Barahona (c. 1560 – after 1625), Spanish composer of the Renaissance
- Juan de Esquivel (d. 1523), Spanish Governor of Jamaica, 1510–1514
- Juan Bautista Esquivel Lobo (b. 1980), Costa Rican footballer
- Juan García Esquivel (1918–2002), Mexican band leader, pianist, and film composer
- Juan Cruz Esquivel (b. 2000), Argentine footballer
