= Marconato =

Marconato is an Italian surname. Notable people with the surname include:

- Denis Marconato (born 1975), Italian basketball player
- Mauro Marconato (born 1996), Argentine footballer
