= Luciano Pogonza =

Argentine footballer

Personal information
- Full name: Luciano Gabriel Pogonza
- Date of birth: 20 March 1999 (age 27)
- Place of birth: Pinto, Argentina
- Position: Midfielder

Team information
- Current team: Ben Hur

Youth career
- 2007–2009: Sagrado Corazón
- 2009–2019: Atlético de Rafaela

Senior career*
Years	Team	Apps	(Gls)
2019–2021	Atlético de Rafaela	11	(0)
2020	→ 9 de Julio (loan)		
2021	9 de Julio		
2022–	Ben Hur		
- * Club domestic league appearances and goals as of 12:42, 4 October 2020 (UTC)

Luciano Gabriel Pogonza (born 1999) is an Argentine professional footballer who plays as a midfielder for Ben Hur.

== Career ==
Pogonza started out in the youth set-up of Sagrado Corazón in Rosario, prior to going to Atlético de Rafaela in 2009. The latter gave Pogonza his start in senior football. His bow in the professional game arrived in February 2019, with Juan Manuel Llop selecting him to start an eventual 0–1 loss in Primera B Nacional at the Estadio Nuevo Monumental versus Villa Dálmine. After twelve appearances in all competitions, Pogonza was loaned out to 9 de Julio. He returned to Rafaela after training had resumed following the COVID-19 pandemic, though picked up an injury soon after.

== Career statistics ==
As of 4 October 2020.

Club statistics
Club	Season	League			Cup		League Cup		Continental		Other		Total	
Club	Season	Division	Apps	Goals	Apps	Goals	Apps	Goals	Apps	Goals	Apps	Goals	Apps	Goals
Atlético de Rafaela	2018–19	Primera B Nacional	11	0	1	0	—		—		0	0	12	0
Atlético de Rafaela	2019–20	Primera B Nacional	0	0	0	0	—		—		0	0	0	0
Career total			11	0	1	0	—		—		0	0	12	0
