= Alan Bonansea =

Argentine footballer (born 1996)

Personal information
- Full name: Alan Leonel Bonansea
- Date of birth: 6 May 1996 (age 30)
- Place of birth: Villa Gobernador Gálvez, Argentina
- Height: 1.91 m (6 ft 3 in)
- Position: Forward

Team information
- Current team: Colón

Youth career
- Lanús

Senior career*
| Years | Team | Apps | (Gls) |
| 2016–2021 | Lanús | 0 | (0) |
| 2016 | → Central Norte (loan) | 3 | (0) |
| 2017–2018 | → Almagro (loan) | 21 | (7) |
| 2018–2019 | → Mitre (loan) | 17 | (5) |
| 2019–2020 | → Atlético Rafaela (loan) | 20 | (4) |
| 2020 | → Rosario Central (loan) | 3 | (0) |
| 2021 | Lokomotiva Zagreb | 4 | (0) |
| 2021 | Chacarita Juniors | 14 | (1) |
| 2022 | Mushuc Runa | 3 | (0) |
| 2022 | Santamarina | 16 | (1) |
| 2023 | Albion | 25 | (5) |
| 2024 | Estudiantes RC | 10 | (2) |
| 2024–2026 | Patronato | 48 | (15) |
| 2026– | Colón | 3 | (1) |
- * Club domestic league appearances and goals as of 19:10, 20 March 2026 (UTC)

Alan Leonel Bonansea (born 6 May 1996) is an Argentine professional footballer who plays as a forward for Colón in the Primera Nacional.

== Career ==
Bonansea started his career with Argentine Primera División side Lanús. In 2016, he departed on loan to sign for Central Norte of Torneo Federal B. He made three appearances for Central Norte before returning to Lanús. On 1 September 2017, Bonansea joined Primera B Nacional's Almagro on loan. He made his professional debut on 16 September in a home defeat to Brown, prior to scoring his first career goal two appearances later against Independiente Rivadavia. He netted seven times in total for them. A third loan away from Lanús was confirmed in July 2018, with Bonansea joining Mitre.

For Mitre, Bonansea scored five goals across seventeen appearances for the club as they placed eleventh in 2018–19. For the subsequent season, Bonansea spent a year on loan with Atlético de Rafaela; again, in the second tier. He scored in games against Brown, ex-club Almagro, Sarmiento and Gimnasia y Esgrima before the season's curtailment due to the COVID-19 pandemic. October 2020 saw Bonansea again depart Lanús on temporary terms, this time he headed to fellow Primera División outfit Rosario Central.

In late March 2021, the Croatian team NK Lokomotiva announced they signed Bonansea as a free agent. However, he returned to Argentina in July, signing with Chacarita Juniors. In January 2022, Bonansea joined Ecuadorian Serie A club Mushuc Runa. In March 2022, according to media reports, a loud argument broke out between Bonansea and the club's headcoach Geovanny Cumbicus. On 12 March 2022, the club announced that Bonansea had left the club "for personal reasons". Bonansea returned to his homeland, after leaving Mushuc Runa, and on 2 June 2022, he signed with Primera Nacional club Santamarina.

== Career statistics ==
As of 29 October 2020.

Club statistics
| Club | Season | League | | | Cup | | League Cup | | Continental | | Other | | Total | |
| Club | Season | Division | Apps | Goals | Apps | Goals | Apps | Goals | Apps | Goals | Apps | Goals | Apps | Goals |
|---|---|---|---|---|---|---|---|---|---|---|---|---|---|---|
| Lanús | 2016–17 | Primera División | 0 | 0 | 0 | 0 | — | | 0 | 0 | 0 | 0 | 0 | 0 |
| Lanús | 2017–18 | Primera División | 0 | 0 | 0 | 0 | — | | 0 | 0 | 0 | 0 | 0 | 0 |
| Lanús | 2018–19 | Primera División | 0 | 0 | 0 | 0 | 0 | 0 | 0 | 0 | 0 | 0 | 0 | 0 |
| Lanús | 2019–20 | Primera División | 0 | 0 | 0 | 0 | 0 | 0 | 0 | 0 | 0 | 0 | 0 | 0 |
| Lanús | 2020–21 | Primera División | 0 | 0 | 0 | 0 | 0 | 0 | 0 | 0 | 0 | 0 | 0 | 0 |
| Lanús | Total | | 0 | 0 | 0 | 0 | 0 | 0 | 0 | 0 | 0 | 0 | 0 | 0 |
| Central Norte (loan) | 2016–17 | Torneo Federal B | 3 | 0 | 0 | 0 | — | | — | | 0 | 0 | 3 | 0 |
| Almagro (loan) | 2017–18 | Primera B Nacional | 21 | 7 | 0 | 0 | — | | — | | 2 (Note: Appearance(s) in the Primera B Nacional play-offs) | 0 | 23 | 7 |
| Mitre (loan) | 2018–19 | Primera B Nacional | 17 | 5 | 0 | 0 | — | | — | | 0 | 0 | 17 | 5 |
| Atlético de Rafaela (loan) | 2019–20 | Primera B Nacional | 20 | 4 | 0 | 0 | — | | — | | 0 | 0 | 20 | 4 |
| Rosario Central (loan) | 2020–21 | Primera División | 2 | 0 | 0 | 0 | 0 | 0 | — | | 0 | 0 | 0 | 0 |
| Career total | | | 61 | 16 | 0 | 0 | 0 | 0 | 0 | 0 | 2 | 0 | 63 | 16 |
