= Joaquín Quinteros =

Argentine footballer

Personal information
- Date of birth: 11 March 1992 (age 34)
- Place of birth: San Miguel de Tucumán, Argentina
- Height: 1.75 m (5 ft 9 in)
- Position: Forward

Team information
- Current team: Mitre

Senior career*
Years	Team	Apps	(Gls)
- Vélez Sarsfield SR
2013–2014	Instituto Deportivo Santiago		
2014	San Jorge		
2015	Juventud Antoniana	11	(1)
2016	Instituto Deportivo Santiago		
2016–2019	Mitre	60	(12)
2019–2020	Atlético de Rafaela	13	(1)
2020–2021	Gimnasia Jujuy	23	(1)
2021–	Mitre	4	(0)
- * Club domestic league appearances and goals as of 19:28, 15 June 2022 (UTC)

Joaquín Quinteros (born 11 March 1992) is an Argentine professional footballer who plays as a forward for Mitre.

== Career ==
Quinteros' career began with Vélez Sarsfield, before he appeared for Instituto Deportivo Santiago in Torneo Argentino B in 2013–14. After departing at the conclusion of the aforementioned competition, Quinteros spent the rest of 2014 with San Jorge. In 2015, Quinteros joined Juventud Antoniana of Torneo Federal A. After scoring one goal, against Unión Sunchales, in fourteen fixtures for Juventud Antoniana, the forward sealed a return to Instituto Deportivo Santiago in January 2016. Six months later, Quinteros made the move back to tier three to join Mitre. He netted five goals as they were promoted.

Quinteros then scored seven goals in his first campaign in professional football, notably notching a brace against Boca Unidos in March 2018 as the club went on to finish thirteenth in 2017–18. Quinteros left Mitre in July 2019, subsequently spending a season with Atlético de Rafaela. August 2020 saw Quinteros join fellow Primera B Nacional team Gimnasia y Esgrima. Mitre

In January 2022, Quinteros joined Mitre.

== Career statistics ==
As of 7 September 2020.

Club statistics
Club	Season	League			Cup		League Cup		Continental		Other		Total	
Club	Season	Division	Apps	Goals	Apps	Goals	Apps	Goals	Apps	Goals	Apps	Goals	Apps	Goals
Juventud Antoniana	2015	Torneo Federal A	11	1	0	0	—		—		3 (Note: Appearance(s) in the Torneo Federal A play-offs)	0	14	1
Mitre	2016–17	Torneo Federal A	15	1	2	1	—		—		5	3	22	5
Mitre	2017–18	Primera B Nacional	22	7	2	0	—		—		0	0	24	7
Mitre	2018–19	Primera B Nacional	23	4	0	0	—		—		0	0	23	4
Mitre	Total		60	12	4	1	—		—		5	3	69	16
Atlético de Rafaela	2019–20	Primera B Nacional	13	1	0	0	—		—		0	0	13	1
Gimnasia y Esgrima	2020–21	Primera B Nacional	0	0	0	0	—		—		0	0	0	0
Career total			84	14	4	1	—		—		8	3	96	18
