= Margarita, Santa Fe =

Municipality in Argentina

Coordinates: 29.692°S 60.252°W

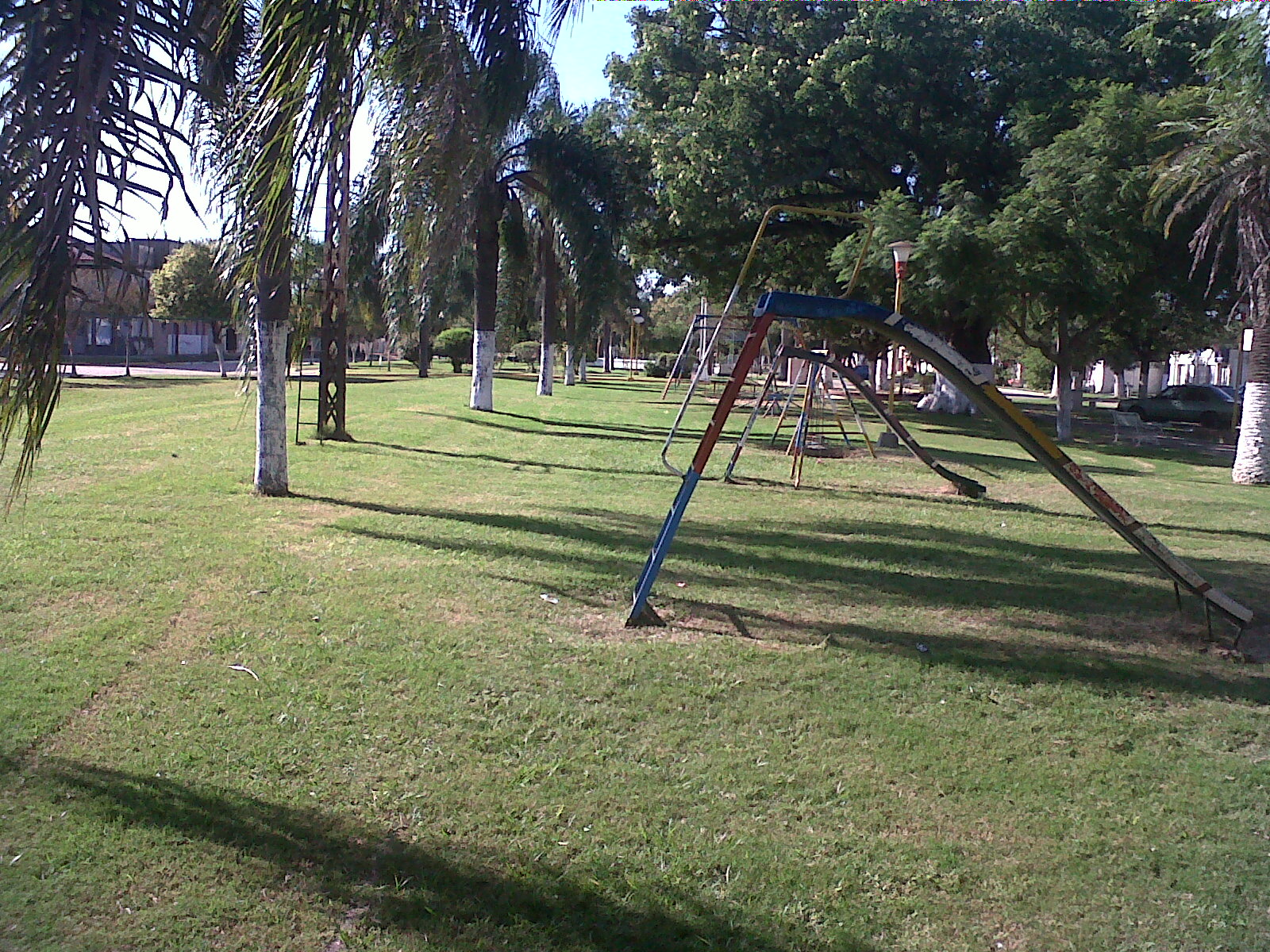
Margarita (Santa Fe)

Margarita is a municipality in Vera Department, Santa Fe Province, Argentina. The municipality was created on January 31, 1899. It is located 229 km from the provincial capital, Santa Fe de la Vera Cruz. As of 2010, the town of Margarita has 5,100 residents.

== Notable residents ==
- Emir Faccioli, football player of the first division the boliviana.
- Marcos Maidana, ex boxer
- Roque Ramírez, football player
