= Juan Cruz Esquivel =

Argentine footballer (born 2000)

Personal information
- Date of birth: 22 August 2000 (age 26)
- Place of birth: Cañada Rosquín, Argentina
- Height: 1.75 m (5 ft 9 in)
- Position: Left winger

Team information
- Current team: San Martín Tucumán (on loan from Tigre)
- Number: 11

Youth career
- Juventud Unida Rosquín
- Atlético de Rafaela

Senior career*
Years	Team	Apps	(Gls)
2019–2021	Atlético de Rafaela	26	(6)
2021–2023	Talleres	15	(0)
2022	→ Platense (loan)	20	(2)
2023	→ Patronato (loan)	20	(4)
2023–	Tigre	20	(1)
2024	→ Gimnasia de La Plata (loan)	6	(0)
2025–	→ San Martín Tucumán (loan)	22	(5)
- * Club domestic league appearances and goals as of 18:33, 16 August 2025 (UTC)

Juan Cruz Esquivel (born 22 August 2000) is an Argentine professional footballer who plays as a left winger for San Martín Tucumán, on loan from Tigre.

== Career ==
Esquivel began in the senior ranks of Atlético de Rafaela, after joining from Juventud Unida Rosquín. Having been an unused substitute on the bench in a Primera B Nacional home loss to Villa Dálmine on 1 February 2019, the midfielder appeared for his professional bow under manager Juan Manuel Llop three weeks later versus Defensores de Belgrano; he was subbed on for the final twenty-two minutes in place of Matías Quiroga.

== Career statistics ==
As of 24 November 2021.

Appearances and goals by club, season and competition
Club	Season	League			Cup		Continental		Other		Total	
Club	Season	Division	Apps	Goals	Apps	Goals	Apps	Goals	Apps	Goals	Apps	Goals
Atlético de Rafaela	2018–19	Primera B Nacional	3	0	0	0	—		0	0	3	0
Atlético de Rafaela	2019-20	Primera B Nacional	4	0	1	0	—		0	0	5	0
Atlético de Rafaela	2021	Primera B Nacional	19	6	0	0	—		0	0	19	6
Talleres de Córdoba	2021	Argentine Primera División	10	0	0	0	—		0	0	10	0
Career total			36	6	1	0	—		0	0	37	6
