= Enzo Gaggi =

Argentine footballer (born 1998)

Personal information
- Full name: Enzo Gaggi
- Date of birth: 14 January 1998 (age 28)
- Place of birth: Rafaela, Argentina
- Height: 1.74 m (5 ft 9 in)
- Position: Winger

Team information
- Current team: Gimnasia Mendoza

Youth career
- Atlético de Rafaela

Senior career*
Years	Team	Apps	(Gls)
2017–2020	Atlético de Rafaela	29	(0)
2019–2020	→ Central Norte (loan)	15	(4)
2020–2021	Central Norte	4	(1)
2021–2022	Defensores de Belgrano	12	(0)
2022–2023	Chaco For Ever	25	(3)
2023	Volos	15	(1)
2023–2024	Godoy Cruz	4	(0)
2024–2025	Delfín	13	(1)
2025–	Gimnasia Mendoza	9	(0)
- * Club domestic league appearances and goals as of 17:48, 11 January 2026 (UTC)

Enzo Gaggi (born 14 January 1998) is an Argentine professional footballer who plays as a midfielder for Gimnasia Mendoza

== Career ==
Gaggi began his career with Atlético de Rafaela. He made his professional debut on 28 May 2017 during an Primera División match with Belgrano, which was the first of five league appearances for the club in 2016–17 as they were relegated to Primera B Nacional. Gaggi subsequently appeared fifteen times across the 2018–19 Primera B Nacional campaign. For 2019–20, Gaggi was loaned to Torneo Federal A with Central Norte. He scored four goals in fifteen appearances for them. He returned to Rafaela on 30 June 2020, amid a conflict with Central Norte over unpaid income.

== Career statistics ==
As of 11 January 2026.

Club statistics
Club	Division	League			Cup		Continental		Total	
Club	Division	Season	Apps	Goals	Apps	Goals	Apps	Goals	Apps	Goals
Atlético de Rafaela	Primera División	2016–17	5	0	2	0	—		7	0
Atlético de Rafaela	Primera B Nacional	2017–18	15	0	1	0	—		16	0
Atlético de Rafaela	Primera B Nacional	2018–19	9	0	—		—		9	0
Atlético de Rafaela	Total		29	0	3	0	0	0	32	0
Central Norte	Torneo Federal A	2019–20	19	5	2	0	—		21	5
Defensores de Belgrano	Primera B Nacional	2021	12	0	—		—		12	0
Chaco For Ever	Primera B Nacional	2022	25	3	—		—		25	3
Volos	Super League Greece	2022–23	15	1	1	0	—		16	1
Godoy Cruz	Primera División	2023	4	0	—		—		4	0
Delfín S.C.	Serie A	2024	13	1	1	0	5	0	19	1
Gimnasia Mendoza	Primera Nacional	2025	9	0	—		—		9	0
Career total			126	10	7	0	5	0	138	10
