= Matías Godoy =

Argentine footballer (born 2002)

Personal information
- Full name: Matías Emanuel Godoy
- Date of birth: 10 January 2002 (age 24)
- Place of birth: Ceres, Argentina
- Height: 1.72 m (5 ft 8 in)
- Position: Forward

Team information
- Current team: Aldosivi (on loan from Estudiantes)
- Number: 21

Youth career
- 2006–2011: Central Argentino Olímpico
- 2011–2018: Atlético de Rafaela

Senior career*
Years	Team	Apps	(Gls)
2018–2021	Atlético de Rafaela	7	(1)
2020	→ Dinamo Zagreb II (loan)	3	(0)
2020–2021	→ Argentinos Juniors (loan)	0	(0)
2021–2023	Argentinos Juniors	0	(0)
2021	→ Instituto (loan)	11	(2)
2022	→ Talleres (loan)	34	(1)
2023–	Estudiantes	22	(2)
2024	→ Central Córdoba SdE (loan)	28	(1)
2025	→ Instituto (loan)	11	(0)
2025	→ Central Córdoba SdE (loan)	7	(0)
2026	→ Colón (loan)	8	(0)
2026–	→ Aldosivi (loan)	9	(0)

International career^{‡}
- Argentina U15
2018–2019	Argentina U17	17	(6)
Medal record
Men's football
Representing Argentina
South American U-15 Championship
Winner	2017 Argentina
South American U-17 Championship
Winner	2019 Peru
- * Club domestic league appearances and goals as of 17:49, 6 November 2026 (UTC) ‡ National team caps and goals as of 13:55, 16 October 2020 (UTC)

Matías Emanuel Godoy (born 10 January 2002) is an Argentine professional footballer who plays as a forward for Aldosivi, on loan from Estudiantes de La Plata.

== Club career ==
=== Early years ===
Godoy's career began with Club Central Argentino Olímpico, before he was signed by Atlético de Rafaela in 2011.

=== Atlético de Rafaela ===
He was moved in their senior squad in April 2018 at the age of sixteen, subsequently being selected for his professional debut by interim manager Víctor Bottaniz on 16 April during a home defeat to Quilmes in Primera B Nacional; he was substituted on in place of Jorge Velázquez with twenty-two minutes remaining. Godoy netted his first goal in April 2019 against Independiente Rivadavia.

==== Dinamo Zagreb loan ====
On 12 February 2020, Godoy joined Prva HNL club Dinamo Zagreb on loan. He never appeared competitively for their first-team, instead featuring for their reserve team in the second tier. Godoy made appearances against Orijent 1919, Hrvatski Dragovoljac and Sesvete–all off the bench–before the season's early end due to the COVID-19 pandemic.

==== Argentinos Juniors ====
In September 2020, Godoy completed a six-month loan move to Argentine Primera División side Argentinos Juniors with a purchase option. He was later bought free from Rafaela in the beginning of 2021. On 19 August 2021, Godoy was loaned out to Primera Nacional club Instituto until the end of the year. In February 2022, he joined Talleres de Córdoba on a one-year loan deal.

==== Estudiantes de La Plata ====
On 26 December 2022, Godoy was transferred to Estudiantes de La Plata in exchange for $700,000 for 50% of his contract, Argentinos Juniors kept the other 50% of his contract in the case of a future sale. Godoy debuted with Estudiantes on 28 January 2023, against Club Atlético Tigre in a 2–1 loss in which he played all 90 minutes. His first goal with Estudiantes was in the 9th minute of Matchday 2 against Arsenal de Sarandí on 4 February 2023, which ended in a 1–1 tie.

== International career ==
Godoy represented Argentina's U15s at the 2017 South American Championship, scoring four goals as Argentina won the tournament. In 2018, Godoy was called up to the Argentina U17s for a tournament in Mexico City with Chile, Mexico and the United States. He featured for sixty-eight minutes and scored the opening goal of a 2–1 victory over the United States on 4 October. Godoy made Pablo Aimar's squad in March 2019 for the South American U-17 Championship in Peru, before being selected by Diego Placente for the 2019 Granatkin Memorial months later. He'd play five times and score once, versus Iran, as they won the cup.

In October 2019, Godoy was called up for the 2019 FIFA U-17 World Cup in Brazil. He scored on his second tournament appearance against Cameroon at the Estádio Kléber Andrade on 31 October.

== Career statistics ==
As of 16 October 2020.

Club statistics
Club	Season	League			Cup		League Cup		Continental		Total	
Club	Season	Division	Apps	Goals	Apps	Goals	Apps	Goals	Apps	Goals	Apps	Goals
Atlético de Rafaela	2017–18	Primera B Nacional	1	0	0	0	—		—		1	0
Atlético de Rafaela	2018–19	Primera B Nacional	1	1	0	0	—		—		1	1
Atlético de Rafaela	2019–20	Primera B Nacional	5	0	0	0	—		—		5	0
Atlético de Rafaela	2020–21	Primera B Nacional	0	0	0	0	—		—		0	0
Atlético de Rafaela	Total		7	1	0	0	—		—		7	1
Dinamo Zagreb II (loan)	2019–20	Druga HNL	3	0	—		—		—		3	0
Argentinos Juniors (loan)	2020–21	Primera División	0	0	0	0	0	0	—		0	0
Career total			10	1	0	0	0	0	0	0	10	1

== Honours ==
Central Córdoba (SdE)

- Copa Argentina: 2024

Argentina U15

- South American U-15 Championship: 2017

Argentina U17

- South American U-17 Championship: 2019

Argentina U18

- Granatkin Memorial: 2019
