= Alfredo Pussetto =

Argentine footballer (born 1994)

Personal information
- Date of birth: 2 October 1994 (age 32)
- Place of birth: Cañada Rosquín, Argentina
- Height: 1.74 m (5 ft 8 1/2 in)
- Position: Midfielder

Team information
- Current team: Città di Sant'Agata
- Number: 24

Youth career
- 2013–2017: Atlético de Rafaela

Senior career*
Years	Team	Apps	(Gls)
2017	Atlético de Rafaela	2	(1)
2018	Deportes Temuco	0	(0)
2018–2019	Atlético de Rafaela	1	(0)
2019–2020	Unión de Santa Fe	0	(0)
2021	Deportivo Maipú	3	(0)
2022	Unión de Sunchales	26	(5)
2023	Central Norte	14	(1)
2024	Canicattì	10	(1)
2024	Fasano	3	(0)
2024–	Città di Sant'Agata	8	(2)
- * Club domestic league appearances and goals as of 17 November 2024

Alfredo Pussetto (born 2 October 1994) is an Argentine professional footballer who plays as a midfielder for Italian Serie D club Città di Sant'Agata.

== Career ==
Pussetto began his career with Atlético de Rafaela, with the midfielder being promoted into their first-team squad under manager Juan Manuel Llop in 2016–17. His professional debut arrived on 22 June 2017 against Tigre, prior to Pussetto netting his first goal during his second appearance three days after versus Sarmiento. His first campaign with Rafaela ended with relegation to Primera B Nacional. In January 2018, Pussetto completed a move to Chilean Primera División side Deportes Temuco. He rejoined Rafaela six months later without featuring for the Chileans, though had been an unused sub once in the Copa Sudamericana.

In mid-2019, Pussetto joined Argentine Primera División outfit Unión Santa Fe.

On 20 July 2024, Pussetto signed with Fasano in Italian Serie D.

== Personal life ==
Pussetto is the brother of fellow professional footballer Ignacio Pussetto.

== Career statistics ==
As of 29 June 2020.

Club statistics
Club	Season	League			Cup		League Cup		Continental		Other		Total	
Club	Season	Division	Apps	Goals	Apps	Goals	Apps	Goals	Apps	Goals	Apps	Goals	Apps	Goals
Atlético de Rafaela	2016–17	Argentine Primera División	2	1	0	0	—		—		0	0	2	1
Atlético de Rafaela	2017–18	Primera B Nacional	0	0	0	0	—		—		0	0	0	0
Atlético de Rafaela	Total		2	1	0	0	—		—		0	0	2	1
Deportes Temuco	2018	Chilean Primera División	0	0	0	0	—		0	0	0	0	0	0
Atlético de Rafaela	2018–19	Primera B Nacional	1	0	0	0	—		—		0	0	1	0
Unión Santa Fe	2019–20	Argentine Primera División	0	0	0	0	0	0	0	0	0	0	0	0
Career total			3	1	0	0	0	0	0	0	0	0	3	1
