= Diego Meza =

Argentine footballer

Personal information
- Full name: Diego Ezequiel Meza
- Date of birth: 28 April 1999 (age 27)
- Place of birth: Resistencia, Argentina
- Position: Midfielder

Youth career
- Atlético de Rafaela

Senior career*
Years	Team	Apps	(Gls)
2017–2021	Atlético de Rafaela	19	(1)
2020	→ Unión Sunchales (loan)	7	(0)
- * Club domestic league appearances and goals as of 13:52, 10 July 2020 (UTC)

Diego Ezequiel Meza (born 28 April 1999) is an Argentine professional footballer who plays as a midfielder.

== Career ==
Meza's career started with Atlético de Rafaela. He made his professional football bow during a 2016–17 Argentine Primera División fixture with Tigre on 22 June 2017, in a campaign which ended with relegation to Primera B Nacional. Three appearances followed in 2017–18, with the midfielder netting his first senior goal in the process against Villa Dálmine in April 2018. In January 2020, Meza was loaned for twelve months to Unión Sunchales of Torneo Federal A.

== Career statistics ==
As of 10 July 2020.

Club statistics
Club	Season	League			Cup		League Cup		Continental		Other		Total	
Club	Season	Division	Apps	Goals	Apps	Goals	Apps	Goals	Apps	Goals	Apps	Goals	Apps	Goals
Atlético de Rafaela	2016–17	Primera División	1	0	0	0	—		—		0	0	1	0
Atlético de Rafaela	2017–18	Primera B Nacional	3	1	0	0	—		—		0	0	3	1
Atlético de Rafaela	2018–19	Primera B Nacional	9	0	1	0	—		—		0	0	10	0
Atlético de Rafaela	2019–20	Primera B Nacional	0	0	0	0	—		—		0	0	0	0
Atlético de Rafaela	Total		13	1	1	0	—		—		0	0	14	1
Unión Sunchales (loan)	2019–20	Torneo Federal A	7	0	2	0	—		—		0	0	9	0
Career total			20	1	3	0	—		—		0	0	23	1
