= Emir Faccioli =

Argentine footballer

Personal information
- Full name: Emir Saúl Faccioli
- Date of birth: August 5, 1989 (age 37)
- Place of birth: Margarita, Santa Fe, Argentina
- Height: 1.85 m (6 ft 1 in)
- Position: Centre-back

Team information
- Current team: Defensores de Belgrano

Youth career
- Lanús

Senior career*
Years	Team	Apps	(Gls)
2007–2013	Lanús	33	(1)
2010–2011	→ Frosinone (loan)	2	(0)
2011	→ Godoy Cruz (loan)	7	(1)
2011–2012	→ Olimpo (loan)	0	(0)
2012–2013	→ Colón (loan)	1	(0)
2013–2016	Defensa y Justicia	60	(1)
2016	Unión de Santa Fe	3	(0)
2016–2018	All Boys	57	(3)
2018–2019	Brown (A)	9	(0)
2019	Guabirá	17	(0)
2020–2021	Gimnasia (J)	40	(0)
2022–	Defensores (N)	14	(0)
- * Club domestic league appearances and goals as of 16:09, 14 July 2022 (UTC)

Emir Faccioli (born 5 August 1989 in Margarita) is an Argentine footballer, who plays as a centre-back for Defensores de Belgrano in the Primera Nacional.

== Career ==
He is known in South America as an up-and-coming player and has received positive comments from players such as Diego Maradona and Diego Simeone. He has also played for Argentine youth teams as a youngster.

In February 2010, Faccioli was strongly linked with Italian club Palermo, but in July he was loaned to Frosinone Calcio.
