= Franco Racca =

Argentine footballer (born 1992)

Personal information
- Full name: Franco Emiliano Racca
- Date of birth: 15 January 1992 (age 34)
- Place of birth: Leones, Argentina
- Height: 1.84 m (6 ft 0 in)
- Position: Centre-back

Senior career*
Years	Team	Apps	(Gls)
2011–2014	Sarmiento	32	(3)
2013–2014	→ Chacarita Juniors (loan)	22	(0)
2014–2020	Chacarita Juniors	16	(1)
2016–2019	→ Deportivo Morón (loan)	45	(1)
2019–2020	→ Atlético de Rafaela (loan)	16	(3)
Total		131	(8)
- * Club domestic league appearances and goals

Franco Emiliano Racca (born 15 January 1992) is an Argentine former professional footballer who played as a centre-back.

== Career ==
Racca's career started with local club Sarmiento. He featured thirty-two times and scored three goals across the 2011–12 and 2012–13 seasons in Torneo Argentino B. In June 2013, Racca was signed on loan by Primera B Metropolitana's Chacarita Juniors. Twenty-six appearances followed, which preceded the club signing him permanently on 30 June 2014. He subsequently scored his first goal for them, netting during a draw with Villa Dálmine on 23 September in a campaign which ended with promotion to Primera B Nacional. After nineteen months in tier two, Racca was loaned to Deportivo Morón in 2016.

He made his debut for Deportivo Morón on 30 August in the Copa Argentina against Newell's Old Boys, before scoring for the first time during a Primera B Metropolitana fixture with Platense as they went on to win the 2016–17 title. Racca remained with Morón until June 2019. Upon returning to Chacarita, Racca was immediately loaned back out again to Atlético de Rafaela. He made sixteen appearances and scored three goals; versus Santamarina, Instituto and Quilmes. Racca's loan with Rafaela expired in June 2020, with the defender subsequently announcing his retirement from professional football.

== Career statistics ==
Club statistics
Club	Season	League			Cup		League Cup		Continental		Other		Total	
Club	Season	Division	Apps	Goals	Apps	Goals	Apps	Goals	Apps	Goals	Apps	Goals	Apps	Goals
Chacarita Juniors (loan)	2013–14	Primera B Metropolitana	22	0	4	0	—		—		0	0	26	0
Chacarita Juniors	2014	Primera B Metropolitana	10	1	0	0	—		—		0	0	10	1
Chacarita Juniors	2015	Primera B Nacional	1	0	0	0	—		—		0	0	0	1
Chacarita Juniors	2016	Primera B Nacional	5	0	0	0	—		—		0	0	0	5
Chacarita Juniors	2016–17	Primera B Nacional	0	0	0	0	—		—		0	0	0	0
Chacarita Juniors	2017–18	Primera División	0	0	0	0	—		—		0	0	0	0
Chacarita Juniors	2018–19	Primera B Nacional	0	0	0	0	—		—		0	0	0	0
Chacarita Juniors	2019–20	Primera B Nacional	0	0	0	0	—		—		0	0	0	0
Chacarita Juniors	Total		38	1	4	0	—		—		0	0	42	1
Deportivo Morón (loan)	2016–17	Primera B Metropolitana	25	1	3	0	—		—		0	0	28	1
Deportivo Morón (loan)	2017–18	Primera B Nacional	8	0	4	0	—		—		0	0	12	0
Deportivo Morón (loan)	2018–19	Primera B Nacional	12	0	0	0	—		—		0	0	12	0
Deportivo Morón (loan)	Total		45	1	7	0	—		—		0	0	52	1
Atlético de Rafaela (loan)	2019–20	Primera B Nacional	16	3	0	0	—		—		0	0	16	3
Career total			99	5	11	0	—		—		0	0	110	5

== Honours ==
Deportivo Morón

- Primera B Metropolitana: 2016–17
