= Tomás Baroni =

Argentine footballer (born 1995)

Personal information
- Full name: Tomás Martin Baroni
- Date of birth: 25 May 1995 (age 31)
- Place of birth: San Justo, Argentina
- Height: 1.85 m (6 ft 1 in)
- Position: Centre-back

Team information
- Current team: Atlético de Rafaela

Youth career
- Colón de San Justo
- 2013–2016: Unión Santa Fe

Senior career*
Years	Team	Apps	(Gls)
2016–	Atlético de Rafaela	19	(0)
2020	→ Lorca Deportiva (loan)	15	(0)
- * Club domestic league appearances and goals as of 20:29, 18 December 2020 (UTC)

Tomás Martin Baroni (born 25 May 1995) is an Argentine professional footballer who plays as a centre-back for Atlético de Rafaela.

== Career ==
Baroni spent his early career years in Santa Fe with clubs Colón de San Justo and Unión Santa Fe. In 2016, he departed to join Argentine Primera División team Atlético de Rafaela. His first appearance on a Rafaela first-team teamsheet came when he was an unused substitute in the Copa Argentina versus Ferro Carril Oeste on 3 June 2016. Exactly one year later, Baroni made his top-flight professional debut in a match against Godoy Cruz, coming on as a substitute for Mathías Abero. His next two appearances came in Rafaela's final two fixtures of the 2016–17 campaign, a season that ended in relegation.

On 19 January 2020, Baroni joined Spanish Tercera División club Lorca Deportiva on loan until June 2021. He made his debut on 26 January in a win away to Muleño, which preceded a further seven appearances as Lorca were promoted; following the COVID-19 curtailment. He'd appear seven times in Segunda División B, before departing on 18 December 2020 after terminating his loan early. Baroni was sent off on three occasions during his time there, including twice across his final three games; versus UCAM Murcia and Numancia respectively, though did score against the latter in the Copa del Rey defeat.

== Career statistics ==
As of 18 December 2020.

Club statistics
Club	Season	League			Cup		League Cup		Continental		Other		Total	
Club	Season	Division	Apps	Goals	Apps	Goals	Apps	Goals	Apps	Goals	Apps	Goals	Apps	Goals
Atlético de Rafaela	2016–17	Primera División	3	0	0	0	—		—		0	0	3	0
Atlético de Rafaela	2017–18	Primera B Nacional	4	0	0	0	—		—		0	0	4	0
Atlético de Rafaela	2018–19	Primera B Nacional	12	0	2	0	—		—		0	0	14	0
Atlético de Rafaela	2019–20	Primera B Nacional	0	0	0	0	—		—		0	0	0	0
Atlético de Rafaela	2020	Primera B Nacional	0	0	0	0	—		—		0	0	0	0
Atlético de Rafaela	Total		19	0	2	0	—		—		0	0	21	0
Lorca Deportiva (loan)	2019–20	Tercera División	8	0	0	0	—		—		0	0	8	0
Lorca Deportiva (loan)	2020–21	Segunda División B	7	0	1	1	—		—		0	0	8	1
Lorca Deportiva (loan)	Total		15	0	1	1	—		—		0	0	16	1
Career total			34	0	3	1	—		—		0	0	37	1
