= Mateo Castellano =

Argentine footballer (born 1996)

Personal information
- Date of birth: 12 March 1996 (age 30)
- Place of birth: Rafaela, Argentina
- Position: Midfielder

Team information
- Current team: Unión de Sunchales

Senior career*
Years	Team	Apps	(Gls)
2012–2014	Ben Hur	24	(1)
2014–2019	Atlético de Rafaela	13	(0)
2017–2018	→ Estudiantes SL (loan)	11	(0)
2019–2020	Unión de Sunchales	18	(3)
2020–2021	Central Norte	10	(0)
2022–	Atlético de Rafaela	4	(0)
- * Club domestic league appearances and goals as of 17:56, 16 June 2022 (UTC)

Mateo Castellano (born 12 March 1996) is an Argentine footballer who plays for Atlético de Rafaela as a midfielder.
