= Federico Ortíz =

Argentine professional footballer

Personal information
- Date of birth: 24 February 1999 (age 27)
- Place of birth: San Francisco, Argentina
- Position: Forward

Team information
- Current team: Atlético de Rafaela

Youth career
- River Plate
- Newell's Old Boys
- Belgrano
- Atlético de Rafaela

Senior career*
Years	Team	Apps	(Gls)
2019–	Atlético de Rafaela	1	(0)
- * Club domestic league appearances and goals as of 04:29, 20 April 2019 (UTC)

Federico Ortíz (born 24 February 1999) is an Argentine professional footballer who plays as a forward for Atlético de Rafaela.

== Career ==
Ortíz had stints in the academies of River Plate, Newell's Old Boys, Belgrano and Atlético de Rafaela. It was Atlético de Rafaela who gave Ortíz his start in senior football. He was picked for his professional bow on 19 April 2019 by manager Juan Manuel Llop, who selected him off the substitutes bench in place of Mauro Albertengo after thirty-five minutes; the Primera B Nacional fixture ended drawn at 1–1.

== Career statistics ==
As of 20 April 2019.

Appearances and goals by club, season and competition
Club	Season	League			Cup		League Cup		Continental		Other		Total	
Club	Season	Division	Apps	Goals	Apps	Goals	Apps	Goals	Apps	Goals	Apps	Goals	Apps	Goals
Atlético de Rafaela	2018–19	Primera B Nacional	1	0	0	0	—		—		0	0	1	0
Career total			1	0	0	0	—		—		0	0	1	0
