= Ijiel Protti =

Argentine footballer

Personal information
- Full name: Ijiel César Protti
- Date of birth: 31 January 1995 (age 31)
- Place of birth: Arteaga, Argentina
- Height: 1.75 m (5 ft 9 in)
- Position: Forward

Team information
- Current team: Rafaela

Youth career
- 2008–2015: Rosario

Senior career*
Years	Team	Apps	(Gls)
2015–2018	Rosario	4	(0)
2016–2017	→ Talleres (loan)	0	(0)
2017–2018	→ Chacarita (loan)	6	(0)
2018–2019	Dálmine	24	(9)
2019–2020	Rafaela	20	(7)
2020–2025	Tigre	76	(9)
2025–	Rafaela	10	(1)
- * Club domestic league appearances and goals as of 18:36, 27 March 2026 (UTC)

Ijiel César Protti (born 31 January 1995) is an Argentine professional footballer who plays as a forward for Atlético Rafaela.

== Career ==
Protti joined Rosario Central in 2008, before beginning his senior career with the club in June 2015. Protti was selected as a substitute for an Primera División match with Independiente on 7 June, he was subbed on for the last fourteen minutes of a 1–1 draw. That was his sole appearance in 2015, which preceded four appearances in the following campaign of 2016. In August 2016, Protti signed for Talleres of the Primera División on loan. He returned to Rosario Central a year later without featuring in a first-team fixture for Talleres. On 23 August 2017, Protti joined Chacarita Juniors on loan.

Primera B Nacional's Villa Dálmine completed the capture of Protti in July 2018. He scored three goals in his first two league appearances, including a brace on debut versus Instituto. A total of nine goals were netted by Protti for the club across 2018–19. July 2019 saw Protti head across the division to Atlético de Rafaela. He netted seven times for them, the first and last of which were scored against All Boys. In August 2020, Protti signed for Tigre.

== Personal life ==
He is the nephew of former professional footballer Sergio Protti.

== Career statistics ==
As of 4 September 2020.

Club statistics
Club	Season	League			Cup		League Cup		Continental		Other		Total	
Club	Season	Division	Apps	Goals	Apps	Goals	Apps	Goals	Apps	Goals	Apps	Goals	Apps	Goals
Rosario Central	2015	Primera División	1	0	0	0	—		—		0	0	1	0
Rosario Central	2016	Primera División	3	0	0	0	—		1 (Note: Appearance(s) in the Copa Libertadores)	0	0	0	4	0
Rosario Central	2016–17	Primera División	0	0	0	0	—		—		0	0	0	0
Rosario Central	2017–18	Primera División	0	0	0	0	—		0	0	0	0	0	0
Rosario Central	Total		4	0	0	0	—		1	0	0	0	5	0
Talleres (loan)	2016–17	Primera División	0	0	0	0	—		—		0	0	0	0
Chacarita Juniors (loan)	2017–18	Primera División	6	0	0	0	—		—		0	0	6	0
Villa Dálmine	2018–19	Primera B Nacional	24	9	1	0	—		—		0	0	25	9
Atlético de Rafaela	2019–20	Primera B Nacional	20	7	0	0	—		—		0	0	20	7
Tigre	2020–21	Primera B Nacional	0	0	0	0	—		—		0	0	0	0
Career total			54	16	1	0	—		1	0	0	0	56	16
