= Facundo Britos =

Argentine footballer (born 1996)

Personal information
- Full name: Facundo Britos
- Date of birth: 5 June 1996 (age 30)
- Place of birth: Gualeguay, Argentina
- Height: 1.80 m (5 ft 11 in)
- Position: Midfielder

Youth career
- Club Barrio Norte
- Tiro Federal
- Unión-SF

Senior career*
Years	Team	Apps	(Gls)
2016–2019	Unión-SF	1	(0)
2019–2020	Rafaela	0	(0)
2020–2021	Armenio	13	(0)
2021	Talleres RE	1	(0)
- * Club domestic league appearances and goals as of 18:58, 15 June 2022 (UTC)

Facundo Britos (born 5 June 1996) is an Argentine professional footballer who plays as a midfielder.

== Career ==
Britos played youth football for Club Barrio Norte, Tiro Federal and Unión Santa Fe. His senior footballing career began in 2016 with Unión Santa Fe of the Argentine Primera División. He was an unused sub on 8 November versus Atlético Tucumán, prior to making his professional debut a month later during a 2–0 victory over Rosario Central. It was his sole appearance in the 2016–17 Argentine Primera División, though he did feature in a Copa Argentina tie with Nueva Chicago in June 2017.

== Career statistics ==
As of 26 May 2018.

Club statistics
Club	Season	League			Cup (Note: Includes the Copa Argentina)		League Cup		Continental		Other		Total	
Club	Season	Division	Apps	Goals	Apps	Goals	Apps	Goals	Apps	Goals	Apps	Goals	Apps	Goals
Unión Santa Fe	2016–17	Primera División	1	0	1	0	—		—		0	0	2	0
Unión Santa Fe	2017–18	Primera División	0	0	0	0	—		—		0	0	0	0
Career total			1	0	1	0	—		—		0	0	2	0
