= Agustín Nadruz =

Uruguayan footballer (born 1996)

Personal information
- Full name: Agustín Nadruz Blanco
- Date of birth: 29 June 1996 (age 30)
- Place of birth: Montevideo, Uruguay
- Height: 1.82 m (5 ft 11 1/2 in)
- Position: Midfielder

Team information
- Current team: Sarmiento Junín
- Number: 17

Youth career
- Rocha de Cilindro
- 2009–2017: Peñarol
- 2016–2017: → Boston River (loan)

Senior career*
Years	Team	Apps	(Gls)
2017–2018	Boston River	34	(1)
2018–2019	Atlético Rafaela	10	(0)
2019–2021	Boston River	47	(2)
2021–2023	Curicó Unido	62	(5)
2024	Deportes Iquique	28	(5)
2025	Unión Española	17	(0)
2026	Cobresal	17	(2)
2026–	Sarmiento Junín	2	(0)

International career
2010–2011	Uruguay U15	23	(0)
2011	Uruguay U17	6	(1)
- * Club domestic league appearances and goals as of 18:08, 10 November 2026 (UTC)

Agustín Nadruz Blanco (born 29 June 1996) is an Uruguayan professional footballer who plays as a midfielder for Argentine club Sarmiento de Junín.

== Career ==
=== Club ===
Nadruz began his career with Rocha de Cilindro's academy, before being signed by Peñarol. Fellow Uruguayan Primera División side Boston River signed Nadruz on loan in July 2016, which preceded a permanent move a year later. He was an unused substitute in February 2017 against Racing Club, before making his professional debut in the league on 18 March during a defeat away to Cerro. His first senior goal arrived versus Racing Club in the 2018 Uruguayan Primera División season, a campaign which saw Nadruz depart Boston River midway to join Atlético de Rafaela of Primera B Nacional.

In 2024, Nadruz joined Deportes Iquique from Curicó Unido. The next year, he switched to Unión Española.

On 3 January 2026, Nadruz joined Cobresal. He moved to Argentina with Sarmiento de Junín for the second half of the year.

=== International ===
Nadruz represented Uruguay at U15 and U17 level. He won twenty-three caps for the U15s from 2010, prior to featuring six times and scoring once for the U17s in 2011.

== Career statistics ==
As of 25 November 2018.

Club statistics
Club	Season	League			Cup (Note: Includes the Copa Argentina)		League Cup		Continental (Note: Includes the Copa Sudamericana)		Other		Total	
Club	Season	Division	Apps	Goals	Apps	Goals	Apps	Goals	Apps	Goals	Apps	Goals	Apps	Goals
Boston River	2017	Primera División	15	0	—		—		1 (Note: One appearance in the 2017 Copa Sudamericana)	0	0	0	52	0
Boston River	2018	Primera División	19	1	—		—		3 (Note: Three appearances in the 2018 Copa Sudamericana)	0	0	0	22	1
Boston River	Total		34	1	—		—		4	0	0	0	38	1
Atlético de Rafaela	2018–19	Primera B Nacional	6	0	2	0	—		—		0	0	8	0
Career total			40	1	2	0	—		4	0	0	0	46	1
