= Emiliano Romero (footballer, born 1992) =

Uruguayan footballer

Personal information
- Full name: Emiliano Romero Clavijo
- Date of birth: 30 September 1992 (age 34)
- Place of birth: Santa Lucía, Uruguay
- Height: 1.80 m (5 ft 11 in)
- Position: Midfielder

Team information
- Current team: Atlético de Rafaela

Youth career
- Juventud

Senior career*
Years	Team	Apps	(Gls)
2012–2016	Juventud	84	(1)
2016	→ Atlético de Rafaela (loan)	27	(0)
2017–	Atlético de Rafaela	79	(1)
2021	→ Belgrano (loan)	22	(0)
- * Club domestic league appearances and goals as of 19:19, 15 June 2022 (UTC)

Emiliano Romero Clavijo (born 30 September 1992) is a Uruguayan professional footballer who plays as a midfielder for Atlético de Rafaela.

== Career ==
Romero's career began in 2012 with Uruguayan Primera División club Juventud, he made his debut for Juventud in a league match on 25 August 2012 against River Plate. Seven matches later, against Montevideo Wanderers, Romero received his first red card of his career. Ten months later he scored his first goal, in a Primera División game against Defensor Sporting. In January 2016, Romero left Uruguayan football to join Argentine Primera División side Atlético de Rafaela on loan. He subsequently made fifty-one appearances between joining and June 2017; during which the club signed Romero permanently. On 24 March 2021, Romero joined fellow league club Belgrano on a loan deal for the rest of the year.

== Career statistics ==
As of 11 September 2018.

Club statistics
Club	Season	League			Cup (Note: Includes the Copa Argentina)		League Cup		Continental (Note: Includes the Copa Libertadores and Copa Sudamericana)		Other		Total	
Club	Season	Division	Apps	Goals	Apps	Goals	Apps	Goals	Apps	Goals	Apps	Goals	Apps	Goals
Juventud	2012–13	Uruguayan Primera División	26	0	—		—		—		0	0	26	0
Juventud	2013–14	Uruguayan Primera División	17	1	—		—		—		0	0	17	1
Juventud	2014–15	Uruguayan Primera División	28	0	—		—		—		0	0	28	0
Juventud	2015–16	Uruguayan Primera División	13	0	—		—		4 (Note: Four appearances in 2015 Copa Sudamericana)	0	0	0	17	0
Juventud	2016	Uruguayan Primera División	0	0	—		—		—		0	0	0	0
Juventud	Total		84	1	—		—		4	0	0	0	88	1
Atlético de Rafaela (loan)	2016	Argentine Primera División	5	0	0	0	—		—		0	0	5	0
Atlético de Rafaela (loan)	2016–17	Argentine Primera División	22	0	1	0	—		—		0	0	23	0
Atlético de Rafaela	2017–18	Primera B Nacional	23	0	1	0	—		—		1 (Note: One appearance in 2017–18 Primera B Nacional play-offs)	0	25	0
Atlético de Rafaela	2018–19	Primera B Nacional	0	0	2	0	—		—		0	0	2	0
Atlético de Rafaela	Total		50	0	4	0	—		—		1	0	55	0
Career total			134	1	4	0	—		4	0	1	0	142	1
