= Gianfranco Ferrero =

Argentine footballer (born 1995)

Personal information
- Date of birth: 6 June 1995 (age 31)
- Place of birth: Alicia, Argentina
- Height: 1.76 m (5 ft 9 in)
- Position: Left-back

Team information
- Current team: Racing Córdoba

Youth career
- Atlético de Rafaela

Senior career*
Years	Team	Apps	(Gls)
2016–2019	Atlético de Rafaela	19	(0)
2019–2020	AD Oliveirense	22	(2)
2020–2021	Central Norte	28	(0)
2022–	Racing Córdoba	90	(5)
- * Club domestic league appearances and goals as of 17:19, 15 August 2025 (UTC)

Gianfranco Ferrero (born 6 June 1995) is an Argentine professional footballer who plays as an attacking midfielder for Racing Córdoba.

== Career ==
Ferrero began in Primera División side Atlético de Rafaela's youth teams, before being promoted into the club's first-team in 2016 and subsequently making his debut on 29 November in a Primera División game versus San Martín; Rafaela won 0–3 with Ferrero assisting the third goal. Three more appearances followed, prior to Rafaela suffering relegation to Primera B Nacional. After seventeen appearances in the following two seasons, Ferrero departed to Portugal with AD Oliveirense in June 2019. He scored on debut against AR São Martinho on 25 August, with another goal coming a month later versus Maria da Fonte.

September 2020 saw Ferrero return to his homeland with Torneo Federal A side Central Norte.

== Career statistics ==
As of 16 December 2020.

Club statistics
Club	Season	League			Cup		League Cup		Continental		Other		Total	
Club	Season	Division	Apps	Goals	Apps	Goals	Apps	Goals	Apps	Goals	Apps	Goals	Apps	Goals
Atlético de Rafaela	2016–17	Primera División	4	0	0	0	—		—		0	0	4	0
Atlético de Rafaela	2017–18	Primera B Nacional	5	0	0	0	—		—		0	0	5	0
Atlético de Rafaela	2018–19	Primera B Nacional	10	0	2	0	—		—		0	0	12	0
Atlético de Rafaela	Total		19	0	2	0	—		—		0	0	21	0
AD Oliveirense	2019–20	Campeonato de Portugal	22	2	0	0	—		—		0	0	22	2
Central Norte	2020	Torneo Federal A	2	0	0	0	—		—		0	0	2	0
Career total			43	2	2	0	—		—		0	0	45	2
