= Nereo Fernández =

Argentine footballer (born 1979)

Personal information
- Full name: Nereo Ariel Fernández
- Date of birth: 13 April 1979 (age 47)
- Place of birth: Santa Fe, Argentina
- Height: 1.95 m (6 ft 5 in)
- Position: Goalkeeper

Youth career
- Unión Santa Fe

Senior career*
Years	Team	Apps	(Gls)
2001–2004	Unión Santa Fe	54	(0)
2004–2006	Gimnasia LP	10	(0)
2006–2007	Unión Santa Fe	0	(0)
2007–2009	Gimnasia (J)	32	(0)
2010	Palestino	13	(0)
2010–2011	Boca Unidos	34	(0)
2011–2014	Argentinos Juniors	41	(0)
2014–2019	Unión Santa Fe	126	(0)
2019–2020	Rafaela	15	(0)
- * Club domestic league appearances and goals

Nereo Fernández (born April 13, 1979, in Santa Fe, Argentina) is a retired Argentine footballer.
