= Roque Ramírez =

Argentine footballer

Personal information
- Date of birth: 16 August 1999 (age 27)
- Place of birth: Margarita, Argentina
- Height: 1.76 m (5 ft 9 in)
- Position: Left-back

Team information
- Current team: Atlético Rafaela

Youth career
- Atlético de Rafaela

Senior career*
Years	Team	Apps	(Gls)
2019–2023	Atlético de Rafaela	24	(0)
2022–2023	→ River Plate (loan)	5	(0)
2024	Nueva Chicago	28	(1)
2025–	Atlético Rafaela	7	(1)
- * Club domestic league appearances and goals as of 17:03, 6 June 2025 (UTC)

Roque Ramírez (born 16 August 1999) is an Argentine professional footballer who plays as a left-back for Nueva Chicago.

== Career ==
Ramírez began his career with Atlético de Rafaela. Juan Manuel Llop picked the midfielder for his professional bow on 1 February 2019, he played the full duration of a loss to Villa Dálmine in Primera B Nacional.

== Career statistics ==
As of 13 February 2022.

Club statistics
Club	League			Cup		Continental		Other		Total	
Club	Division	Apps	Goals	Apps	Goals	Apps	Goals	Apps	Goals	Apps	Goals
Atlético de Rafaela	Primera B Nacional	25	0	0	0	0	0	0	0	26	0
River Plate	Primera División Uruguaya	1	0	0	0	0	0	0	0	1	0
Career total		26	0	0	0	0	0	0	0	26	0
