= Nazareno Fernández =

Argentine footballer (born 1997)

Personal information
- Full name: Nazareno Gabriel Fernández Colombo
- Date of birth: 12 January 1997 (age 29)
- Place of birth: Barrio Beliera, Argentina
- Position: Defender

Team information
- Current team: Los Andes

Senior career*
Years	Team	Apps	(Gls)
2016–2018	Platense	12	(0)
2018–2019	Atlético de Rafaela	1	(0)
2021–2023	Real Pilar	68	(0)
2023–	Los Andes	99	(0)
- * Club domestic league appearances and goals as of 17:13, 29 April 2026 (UTC)

Nazareno Gabriel Fernández Colombo (born 12 January 1997) is an Argentine professional footballer who plays as a defender for Los Andes.

== Career ==
=== Club ===
Platense was Fernández's first club. He was promoted into their senior squad by manager Juan Carlos Kopriva during the 2016–17 Primera B Metropolitana campaign, with the defender making his professional debut during a goalless draw away to Defensores de Belgrano on 24 September 2016. He subsequently made eight more appearances that season, before being selected four times in 2017–18. On 4 July 2018, Fernández Colombo joined Atlético de Rafaela of Primera B Nacional.

=== International ===
In 2017, Fernández was selected to train with the Argentina U20s.

== Career statistics ==
As of 22 November 2018.

Club statistics
Club	Season	League			Cup (Note: Includes the Copa Argentina)		League Cup		Continental		Other		Total	
Club	Season	Division	Apps	Goals	Apps	Goals	Apps	Goals	Apps	Goals	Apps	Goals	Apps	Goals
Platense	2016–17	Primera B Metropolitana	8	0	0	0	—		—		1 (Note: One appearance in the 2016–17 Primera B Metropolitana play-offs)	0	9	0
Platense	2017–18	Primera B Metropolitana	4	0	0	0	—		—		0	0	4	0
Platense	Total		12	0	0	0	—		—		1	0	13	0
Atlético de Rafaela	2018–19	Primera B Nacional	0	0	0	0	—		—		0	0	0	0
Career total			12	0	0	0	—		—		1	0	13	0

== Honours ==
Platense

- Primera B Metropolitana: 2017–18
