= Sergio Rodríguez (footballer, born January 1985) =

Uruguayan footballer

Personal information
- Full name: Sergio Gonzalo Rodríguez Budes
- Date of birth: 5 January 1985 (age 41)
- Place of birth: Montevideo, Uruguay
- Height: 1.84 m (6 ft 0 in)
- Position: Centre-back

Youth career
- Danubio

Senior career*
Years	Team	Apps	(Gls)
2005–2009	Danubio	112	(5)
2005	→ Maccabi Tel Aviv (loan)	10	(0)
2010	Quilmes	17	(0)
2010–2011	Rosario Central	12	(1)
2011	Baniyas SC	0	(0)
2011–2012	Montevideo Wanderers	17	(2)
2012–2014	Belgrano	30	(1)
2014	Atlético Tucumán	3	(0)
2015–2016	Instituto	54	(3)
2016–2019	Independiente Rivadavia	52	(2)
2019–2020	Atlético de Rafaela	20	(0)
2020–2021	Danubio	27	(2)
- * Club domestic league appearances and goals

Sergio Gonzalo Rodríguez Budes (born 5 January 1985) is an Uruguayan former footballer.
