= Renso Pérez =

Argentine footballer

Personal information
- Full name: Renso Pérez
- Date of birth: 24 December 1987 (age 38)
- Place of birth: Bolívar, Argentina
- Height: 1.78 m (5 ft 10 in)
- Position: Midfielder

Team information
- Current team: Empleados de Comercio
- Number: 8

Senior career*
Years	Team	Apps	(Gls)
2007–2010	Sportivo Barracas	108	(19)
2010–2011	Atlético Policial	20	(2)
2011–2018	Villa Dálmine	142	(27)
2013–2014	→ Ferro Carril Oeste (loan)	26	(1)
2016–2017	→ Arsenal de Sarandí (loan)	19	(1)
2018–2019	Central Córdoba SdE	21	(0)
2019–2020	Atlético de Rafaela	20	(0)
2020–2021	Agropecuario	25	(0)
2022	Guillermo Brown	35	(6)
2023	Villa Dálmine	24	(1)
2024	Guillermo Brown	28	(1)
2025	Ciudad Bolívar	26	(1)
2026–	Empleados de Comercio		
- * Club domestic league appearances and goals as of 13:27, 11 February 2026 (UTC)

Renso Pérez (born 24 December 1987) is an Argentine professional footballer who plays as a midfielder for Empleados de Comercio in the Liga Deportiva de Bolívar of Argentina.

== Career ==
Pérez's career started with Primera D club Sportivo Barracas, who he remained with for three years before joining Torneo Argentino B side Atlético Policial. His stay with Atlético Policial lasted just a season as he was soon on the move again as he completed a transfer to Primera C team Villa Dálmine. He won the 2011–12 Primera C Metropolitana title in his debut season with the club. He scored eight goals in thirty-six appearances in his next season for Villa Dálmine in the 2012–13 Primera B Metropolitana before he departed in 2013 to join Primera B Nacional side Ferro Carril Oeste on loan.

He scored his first goal for Ferro in his third match, versus Atlético Tucumán. In total, he played in twenty-six league games. Pérez returned to Villa Dálmine and went on to play eighty-five times and score sixteen goals for them, including three goals in twenty-four appearances in their 2014 promotion-winning season. In July 2016, Pérez joined Argentine Primera División team Arsenal de Sarandí on loan. He made his Arsenal and top-flight debut on 27 August against Sarmiento. In his next game, on 13 September, he scored his first goal versus Atlético Tucumán; the same opponents he scored his first Ferro goal for.

Central Córdoba completed the signing of Pérez in June 2018. He netted in his opening appearance, scoring as the club eliminated Primera División team Vélez Sarsfield out of the Copa Argentina.

For the 2025 season, he joined Ciudad de Bolívar in the Torneo Federal A, having come from Guillermo Brown.

In February 2026, he signed with Empleados de Comercio in the Liga Deportiva de Bolívar.

== Career statistics ==
As of 6 September 2018.

Club statistics
Club	Season	League			Cup (Note: Includes the Copa Argentina)		League Cup		Continental		Other		Total	
Club	Season	Division	Apps	Goals	Apps	Goals	Apps	Goals	Apps	Goals	Apps	Goals	Apps	Goals
Central Córdoba	2018–19	Primera B Nacional	2	0	2	1	—		—		0	0	4	1
Career total			2	0	2	1	—		—		0	0	4	1

== Honours ==
Villa Dálmine

- Primera C Metropolitana: 2011–12

Ciudad Bolívar

- Torneo Federal A : 2025
