= Ramiro Macagno =

Argentine footballer

Personal information
- Date of birth: 18 March 1997 (age 29)
- Place of birth: Alicia, Argentina
- Height: 1.85 m (6 ft 1 in)
- Position: Goalkeeper

Team information
- Current team: Independiente Rivadavia (on loan from Levadiakos)
- Number: 12

Youth career
- Atlético Rafaela

Senior career*
Years	Team	Apps	(Gls)
2015–2021	Atlético Rafaela	51	(0)
2019–2021	→ Newell's Old Boys (loan)	10	(0)
2021–2025	Newell's Old Boys	50	(0)
2023	→ Platense (loan)	39	(0)
2025–	Levadiakos	6	(0)
2026–	→ Independiente Rivadavia (loan)	1	(0)
- * Club domestic league appearances and goals as of 16:27, 11 July 2026 (UTC)

Ramiro Jesús Macagno (born 18 March 1997) is an Argentine professional footballer who plays as a goalkeeper for Primera División club Independiente Rivadavia, on loan from Greek Super League side Levadiakos.

== Career statistics ==
As of 31 January 2024.

Club statistics
Club	Division	League			Cup		Continental		Total	
Club	Division	Season	Apps	Goals	Apps	Goals	Apps	Goals	Apps	Goals
Atlético Rafaela	Primera División	2015	0	0	0	0	—		0	0
Atlético Rafaela	Primera División	2016	0	0	0	0	—		0	0
Atlético Rafaela	Primera División	2016-17	5	0	1	0	—		6	0
Atlético Rafaela	Primera B Nacional	2017-18	22	0	3	0	—		25	0
Atlético Rafaela	Primera B Nacional	2018-19	24	0	1	0	—		25	0
Atlético Rafaela	Total		51	0	5	0	0	0	56	0
Newell's Old Boys	Primera División	2020-21	10	0	1	0	—		11	0
Newell's Old Boys	Primera División	2021	8	0	0	0	0	0	8	0
Newell's Old Boys	Primera División	2022	14	0	0	0	—		14	0
Newell's Old Boys	Primera División	2024	0	0	2	0	0	0	2	0
Newell's Old Boys	Total		32	0	3	0	0	0	35	0
Platense	Primera División	2023	22	0	18	0	—		40	0
Career total			105	0	26	0	0	0	131	0
