= Mauro Marconato =

Argentine footballer

Personal information
- Date of birth: 30 May 1996 (age 30)
- Place of birth: Rosario, Argentina
- Height: 1.86 m (6 ft 1 in)
- Position: Forward

Team information
- Current team: Virtus Francavilla
- Number: 32

Senior career*
| Years | Team | Apps | (Gls) |
| –2017 | Colón | 0 | (0) |
| 2014 | → Sportivo Las Parejas (loan) | 1 | (0) |
| 2016–2017 | → Patronato (loan) | 4 | (0) |
| 2017–2020 | Atletico de Rafaela | 15 | (0) |
| 2020–2021 | Lorca Deportiva | 18 | (1) |
| 2021–2022 | ASD Ugento | | |
| 2022–2023 | Francavilla | 33 | (2) |
| 2023–2024 | Barletta | 16 | (1) |
| 2024 | Casarano | 16 | (0) |
| 2024– | Virtus Francavilla | 11 | (0) |
- * Club domestic league appearances and goals as of 17 November 2024

Mauro Marconato (born 30 May 1996) is an Argentine footballer who plays for Italian Serie D club Virtus Francavilla as a forward.
