= Estadio Nuevo Monumental =

Football stadium in Rafaela, Argentina

Nuevo Monumental Stadium
- Estadio Nuevo Monumental

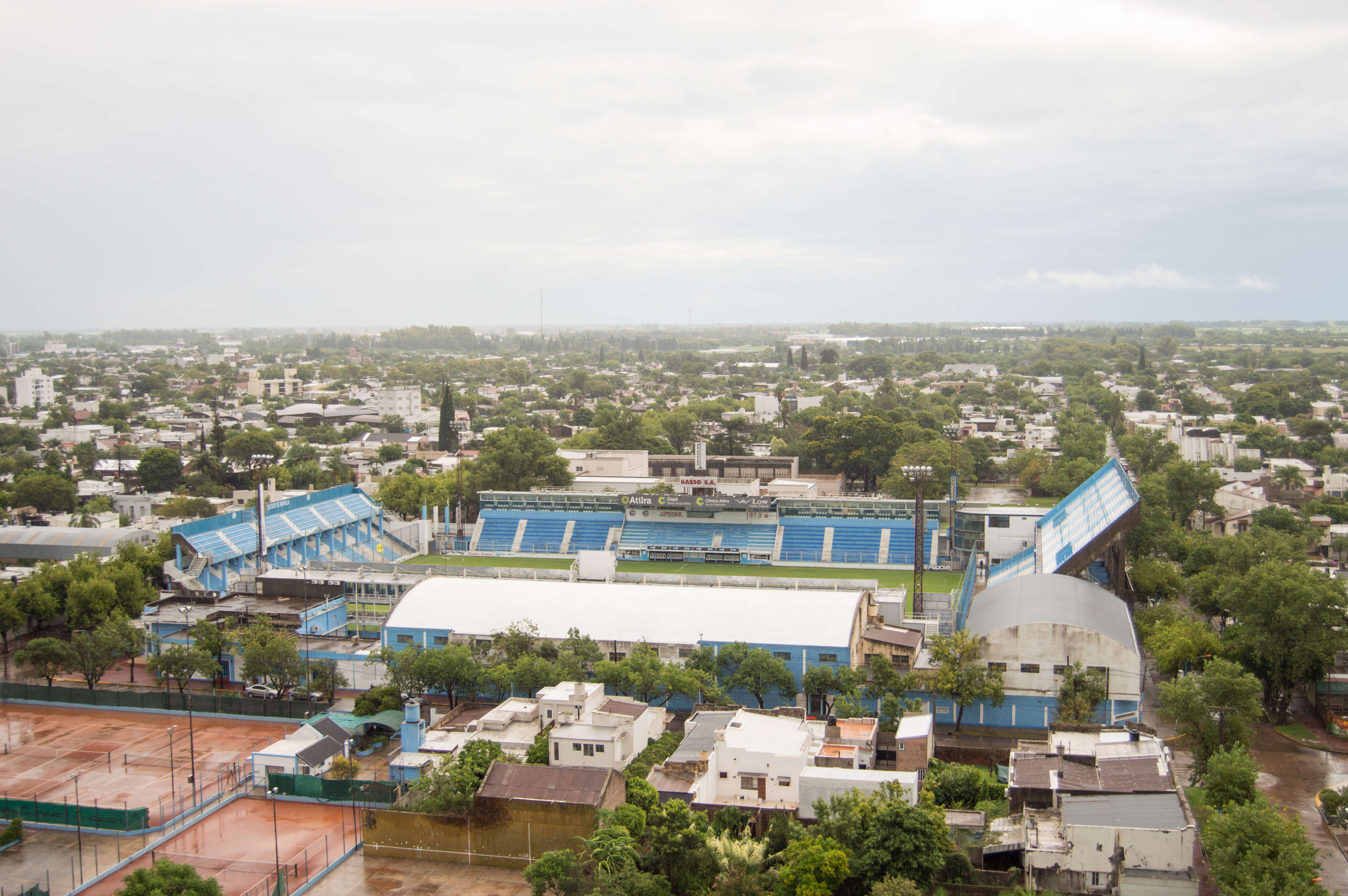
- Aerial view of the stadium in 2016
- Interactive map of Nuevo Monumental Stadium
- Former names: Estadio Monumental (–2003)
- Address: Urquiza y Primera Junta; Rafaela; Argentina
- Owner: Atlético de Rafaela
- Capacity: 14,660
- Type: Stadium
- Surface: Grass
- Field size: 96,70 x 65,45 m

Construction
- Opened: 12 October 1953; 72 years ago
- Renovated: 2003, 2011

Website
- atleticorafaela.com.ar/instalaciones

Estadio Nuevo Monumental is a football stadium located in the city of Rafaela of Santa Fe Province, Argentina. The stadium is owned and operated by club Atlético de Rafaela. The stadium has a capacity of 14,660 spectators and was inaugurated in 1953. The venue changed its name to "Nuevo Monumental" after being refurbished to host Primera División matches in 2003.

== History ==
The first venue of Atlético Rafaela was a field on Santa Fe and Belgrano streets, it had 100 x 70 m. The club rented it during two years for m$n 5 per month. In 1914, the club rented another stadium, remaining there four years for $ 10 a month.

In 1921 the club made a proposal to acquire the land on the block bounded by Urquiza, Primera Junta, Víctor Manuel and Dentesano streets. The offer was accepted, and both parts agreed a first payment of m$n10,000. As Atlético Rafaela only had m$n7,600 funds, the rest of the money was got from benefits raffles and loans from the Municipality of Rafaela and the provincial government.

The land was fenced in 1921, and one year later, a small grandstand was built. The Banco Provincial de Santa Fe (Santa Fe Provincial Bank) granted the club a mortgage loan of $35,000 that allowed Atlético de Rafaela to make the notarial recording, becoming the official owner of that land. Once the land was acquired, the club built the stadium, with goal posts placed on Urquiza and Víctor Manuel streets. A concrete grandstand was built on the north side of the venue. Besides, a basketball court was built on Dentesano street.

The stadium was officially inaugurated on 12 October 1953 in a friendly match v Platense won by the Calamar 5–3. In 1965 the venue inaugurated its lighting system in a friendly match v Atlanta, which won 5–2. President of Atlanta León Kolbowski kicked off the match.

After Atlético de Rafaela promoted to Primera División when the squad won the 2002–03 Primera B Nacional championship, the stadium was refurbished in order to fulfil the AFA requirements for top-division venues. The stadium was re-inaugurated under the name "Nuevo Monumental" on 24 August 2023 in the Atlético Rafaela vs Colón match of 2003–04 Argentine Primera División. When Atlético made a new return to Primera División after winning their second B Nacional tournament in 2011, the club built VIP boxes in the stadium and expanded the measurements of the pitch.

In March 2023, Atlético de Rafaela announced the construction of a new stadium located on the north side of the city with a capacity of 15,000 spectators. The reason to move the venue is based on Nuevo Monumental Stadium is located on a densely populated area that limits its use in professional matches. The project also includes the construction of a multi purpose indoor stadium.
