= Cañada Rosquín =

- Town
- Location of Cañada Rosquín in Argentina
- Coordinates: 32°03′S 61°36′W
- Country: Argentina
- Province: Santa Fe
- Department: San Martín

Government
  - Presidenta comunal: María Eugenia Racciatti (Primero Cañada – Compromiso Real)

Area
  - Total: 309 km^{2} (119 sq mi)

Population (2010)
  - Total: 6,985
  - Density: 22.6/km^{2} (58.5/sq mi)
- Time zone: UTC−3 (ART)
- CPA base: S2454
- Dialing code: +54 3401

Cañada Rosquín is a small town (comuna) in the province of Santa Fe, Argentina. It is located in the San Martín Department, 138 km (86 mi) from the provincial capital (Santa Fe). It has a population of 6985 inhabitants (2010 census [INDEC]).

The town was founded in 1891 by Rafael Escriña. As of the 2023 election, the Communal President is María Eugenia Racciatti.

== Economy ==
The region's economy is predominantly agricultural and livestock farming, with a high production of soya beans. There are some important companies, among them the current soap factory Cooperativa De Trabajo Jabonera Cañada Rosquín Limitada, formerly Sociedad Argentina Grasos y Derivados SA, which deserves a special comment: as a result of bad management by its former owners, this factory was plunged into a state of bankruptcy that seemed to have no return. However, the employees, severely affected by this situation, decided to save this source of work and create a cooperative that took over the business. There is also an insulin company that is the only one in the country and one of only three in the world.

There are also dulce de leche factories such as El Rosquinense and cheese factories such as Alloa lácteos.

== Notable people ==
- León Gieco - well-known musician and singer-songwriter
- Belén Potassa - Argentine footballer, plays professionally for FF La Solana in Spain
