= Rafaela =

- City
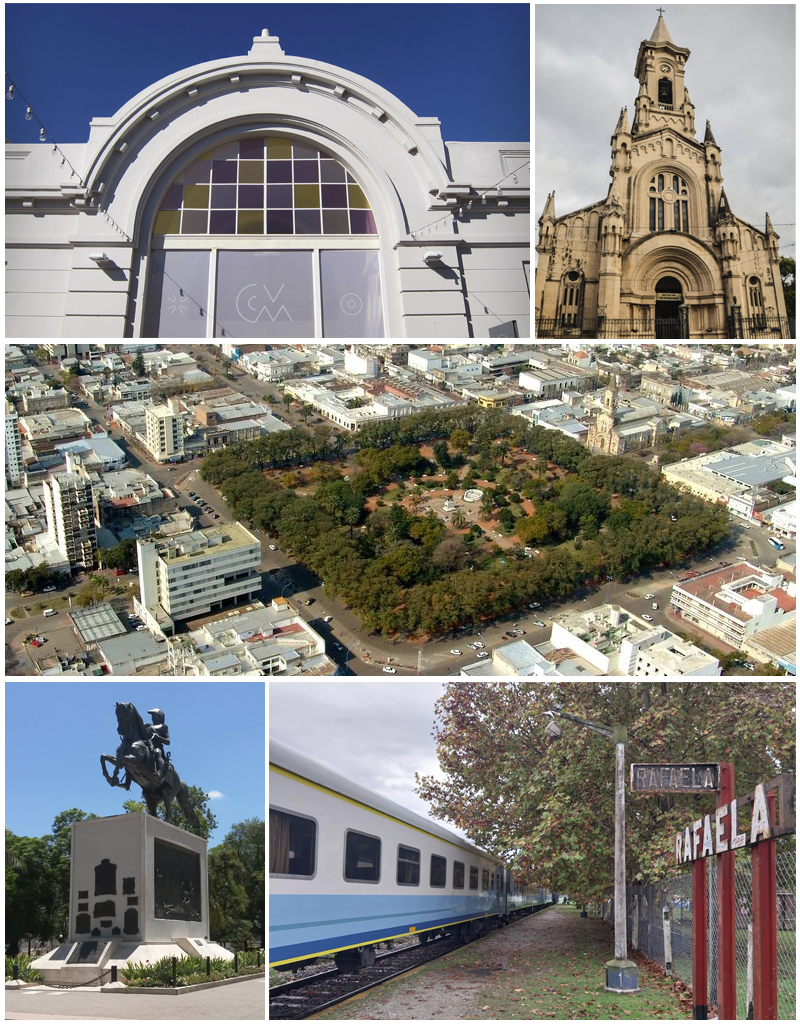
- From left to right and top to bottom: the Municipal Museum of Art Dr. Urbano Poggi, the San Rafael Cathedral, the Plaza 25 de Mayo, the Monument to San Martín, and the Rafaela Station.

- Coat of arms
- Nickname: La Perla del Oeste
- Location of Rafaela in Argentina Rafaela (Argentina)
- Coordinates: 31°16′S 61°29′W
- Country: Argentina
- Province: Santa Fe
- Department: Castellanos
- Established: 1881
- Founder: Guillermo Lehmann

Government
  - Intendant: Leonardo Viotti (UCR)

Area
  - Total: 156 km^{2} (60 sq mi)
- Elevation: 90 m (300 ft)

Population (2023)
  - Total: 110,709
  - Density: 710/km^{2} (1,840/sq mi)
- Demonym: rafaelino/a
- Time zone: UTC−3 (ART)
- CPA base: S2300
- Dialing code: +54 3492
- Website: Official website

Rafaela is a city in Argentina, located in the central-west region of the Santa Fe Province. It serves as the head of the Castellanos Department and is the third most populous and significant urban center in the province, following Rosario and the provincial capital, Santa Fe. The city is known as "The Pearl of the West" due to its natural, cultural, and architectural beauty. According to the socio-economic survey report by ICEDeL, the city's statistical institute, Rafaela had an estimated population of 111,000 in 2022.

The city was named by its founder, Guillermo Lehmann, in honor of Rafaela Rodríguez de Egusquiza, the wife of his friend and business partner, Félix Egusquiza, who were the original owners of the area.

Rafaela is located in the central-western part of Santa Fe province, along National Route 34. It is situated 96 km northwest of Santa Fe city, 234 km from Rosario, 292 km from Córdoba, and 530 km from Buenos Aires. Additionally, its strategic location facilitates trade routes to the ports of the Pacific Ocean due to its proximity to National Route 19.

Economically, Rafaela stands out for its metalworking and dairy industry, being at the heart of the country's largest and richest dairy basin, making it a principal economic capital. The city is considered a "Gateway to the World" due to its industrial connections with most American, European, Far Eastern, and Asia Minor countries.

Culturally, Rafaela is known as the "Capital of Theater" because of its numerous historic theaters such as the Centro Ciudad de Rafaela, with its Juan B. Lasserre Hall dating back to 1932, and the Sociedad Italiana. It also hosts cultural centers like Centro Cultural La Máscara, established in 1996, amphitheaters, and exhibition halls. Most notably, Rafaela is renowned for its traditional and acclaimed Theater Festival, held annually since 2005.

== Architecture and Urban Landscape ==
Rafaela maintains a profile of low-rise houses and a marked contrast of styles across its neighborhoods. The first areas to develop, such as the main square "25 de Mayo," still show traces of the earliest houses. Additionally, older neighborhoods like San Martín (the oldest in the city), 9 de Julio, Sarmiento, Villa Rosas, and Alberdi were among the first to form.

Currently, the city has over 15 towers exceeding 10 stories, along with several other tall buildings. On Mitre Avenue, the two tallest towers in the city can be found: Torre Piamonte and Torre Mitre, both standing at 20 stories and 65 meters high.

Cobblestone streets are still present on the four main avenues and surrounding streets. The presence of these stones as a street covering generates ongoing debate about whether they should remain or be removed. The municipality regularly maintains them, and there are areas in perfect condition.

The quadrant bounded by Tucumán Street, Brasil Avenue, Aconcagua Avenue, and Santa Fe Boulevard, which encloses the neighborhoods of Alberdi, Sarmiento, and Villa Rosas, is the only area in the city where the streets run diagonally compared to the rest of the city. According to a historical account published by the local magazine "El Satélite," this layout dates back to the arrival of the railway, which required construction parallel to the rail lines, resulting in the current street pattern.

== Neighborhoods of the City ==
The following is an alphabetical list of the 42 neighborhoods that make up the city:

- 17 de Octubre
- 2 de Abril
- 30 de Octubre
- 9 de Julio
- Alberdi
- Amancay
- Antártida Argentina
- Barranquitas
- Barrio 42
- Belgrano
- Brigadier General Estanislao López
- Central Córdoba
- El Bosque
- Fátima
- Guillermo Lehmann
- Ilolay
- Independencia
- Italia
- Jardín
- Juan de Garay
- La Cañada
- Los Arces
- Los Nogales
- Luis Fasoli
- Malvinas Argentinas
- Martín Fierro
- Martín Güemes
- Monseñor V. F. Zazpe
- Mora
- Mosconi
- Nuestra Señora del Luján
- Pablo Pizzurno
- San José
- San Martín
- Sarmiento
- Villa Aero Club
- Villa del Parque
- Villa Dominga
- Villa Los Álamos
- Villa Podio
- Villa Rosas
- Virgen del Rosario

== Geography ==
According to the Municipality of Rafaela, the city has a population of 103,000 inhabitants, with 46.5% of the population being under 30 years old. It is located in the central-west region of the Santa Fe province, 96km from the city of Santa Fe, 234km from Rosario, 292km from Córdoba, and 530km from Buenos Aires (the capital city of Argentina).

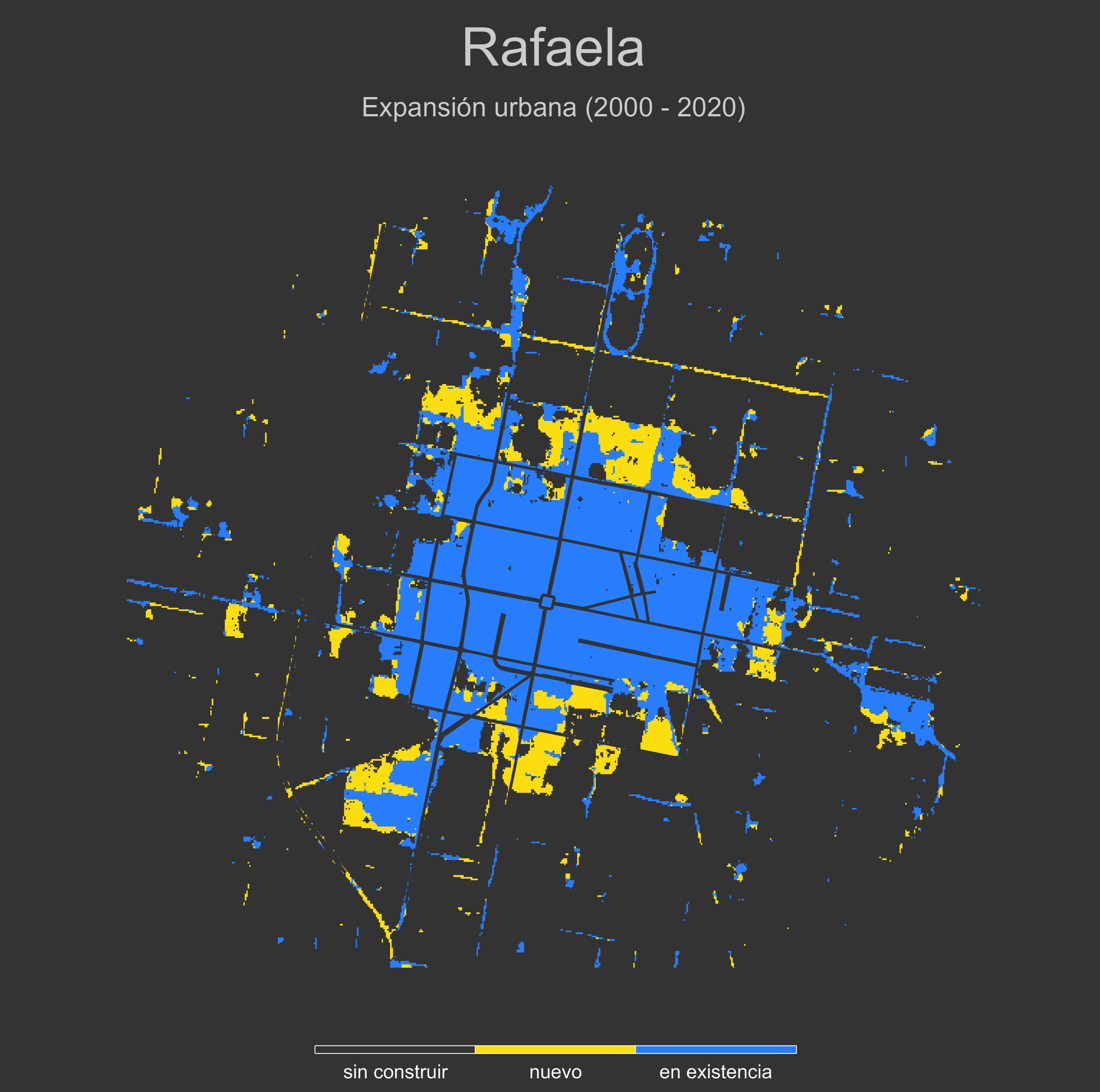
Expansion of the urban area of Rafaela 2000 - 2020

In general terms, the urban area extends across the Pampean plain, in what is known as the depressed pampas. The central terrain of the city is higher than the surrounding areas, with the slope decreasing towards the north and south. These depressions are the natural slopes through which water flows eastward, part of the Salado basin. For this reason, canals have been constructed on both sides of the city, running west-east. The southern canal has been buried along almost its entire length through the urban area.

The city's layout is in a grid pattern with a central square that covers four blocks and four boulevards that originate from it. The urban geography is homogeneous, except in the northwest area where the streets run diagonally. This abrupt change is due to Bartolomé Mitre Avenue, which was built to shorten the path to the train stations when the railway arrived in Rafaela in the 19th century. This has given a different character to a large part of the city.

The city borders Susana to the south (12 km), Lehmann to the north (12 km), Presidente Roca to the west (12 km), and Bella Italia to the east (12 km) from its main square, 25 de Mayo, forming the Rafaela Metropolitan Area. It has 37 neighborhoods and a microcenter. The National Route 34 has been restructured as it passes through the city, turning it into an avenue with central medians along its entire length, connecting the neighborhoods located to the west.

Unlike many other Argentine cities of similar size, Rafaela is not located on a coast or riverbank, sharing this characteristic with its neighboring city, San Francisco.

=== Role of citizen participation in planning ===
In 2008 the municipality of Rafaela created the Department of Administration and Participation (Secretaria de Gestión y Participación, SGP) and after that the government started implementing a process of Participatory budgeting, based on the successful case of Porto Alegre. The main goal of this process is to consolidate and strengthen the importance of citizen participation in the public agenda. The government of the city has implemented the method for three consecutive years. The first one in 2009 was completed; the one for 2010 is now in the stage of implementing the public works that resulted from the participation process; and the third project is in process (SGP, Municipalidad de Rafaela, 2011).

=== Climate ===
Rafaela has a humid subtropical climate typical of the region—with precipitation typically at its most frequent in summer, and least in winter, with warm to hot summers and mild winters with occasional cold nights.

Climate data for Rafaela (1961–1990, extremes 1970–present)
Month	Jan	Feb	Mar	Apr	May	Jun	Jul	Aug	Sep	Oct	Nov	Dec	Year
Record high °C (°F)	42.0 (107.6)	42.0 (107.6)	39.5 (103.1)	36.9 (98.4)	34.6 (94.3)	30.8 (87.4)	32.4 (90.3)	37.2 (99.0)	39.0 (102.2)	41.7 (107.1)	39.1 (102.4)	42.0 (107.6)	42.0 (107.6)
Mean daily maximum °C (°F)	32.1 (89.8)	30.9 (87.6)	28.1 (82.6)	24.7 (76.5)	21.7 (71.1)	17.9 (64.2)	18.1 (64.6)	20.0 (68.0)	22.2 (72.0)	25.3 (77.5)	28.2 (82.8)	30.7 (87.3)	25.0 (77.0)
Daily mean °C (°F)	24.7 (76.5)	23.7 (74.7)	21.4 (70.5)	17.9 (64.2)	15.2 (59.4)	11.4 (52.5)	11.4 (52.5)	12.7 (54.9)	14.8 (58.6)	18.2 (64.8)	21.0 (69.8)	23.6 (74.5)	18.0 (64.4)
Mean daily minimum °C (°F)	18.0 (64.4)	17.4 (63.3)	16.0 (60.8)	12.7 (54.9)	9.7 (49.5)	6.4 (43.5)	6.1 (43.0)	6.8 (44.2)	8.5 (47.3)	11.8 (53.2)	14.6 (58.3)	16.8 (62.2)	12.1 (53.8)
Record low °C (°F)	7.0 (44.6)	5.5 (41.9)	3.0 (37.4)	−1.1 (30.0)	−5.9 (21.4)	−6.4 (20.5)	−8.3 (17.1)	−5.4 (22.3)	−4.0 (24.8)	−0.7 (30.7)	0.0 (32.0)	5.4 (41.7)	−8.3 (17.1)
Average precipitation mm (inches)	121.1 (4.77)	130.1 (5.12)	150.5 (5.93)	82.0 (3.23)	42.0 (1.65)	24.0 (0.94)	23.6 (0.93)	24.6 (0.97)	57.1 (2.25)	82.8 (3.26)	102.8 (4.05)	118.8 (4.68)	959.4 (37.77)
Average precipitation days (≥ 0.1 mm)	8	7	9	7	5	4	5	5	6	8	8	8	80
Average relative humidity (%)	70	74	79	80	81	81	80	77	74	74	73	71	76
Mean monthly sunshine hours	288.3	240.1	229.4	210.0	186.0	159.0	173.6	204.6	216.0	244.9	276.0	291.4	2,719.3
Percentage possible sunshine	66.8	64.8	60.5	62.3	57.0	51.9	54.1	60.1	61.0	61.8	67.2	66.4	61.2
Source 1: NOAA, Oficina de Riesgo Agropecuario (record highs and lows)
Source 2: Servicio Meteorológico Nacional (precipitation days), Instituto Nacional de Tecnología Agropecuaria (sun, 1961–1990)

== Economy ==
Rafaela is notable for its metalworking and dairy industries. It is located in the heart of the dairy basin, the largest in South America, making it the principal dairy capital of the region.

Additionally, other significant activities include agriculture and livestock farming. Rafaela has an active industrial park, which has recently expanded with the creation of the Parque de Actividades Económicas de Rafaela (PAER), where the Instituto Tecnológico Rafaela (ITEC) is located.

== Education ==
=== Educational Institutions ===
==== Primary Schools ====
- School No. 21 Libertador General San Martín (adult education)
- School No. 475 Bernardino Rivadavia
- School No. 476 Juan Bautista Alberdi
- School No. 477 Domingo Faustino Sarmiento
- School No. 478 Villa Rosas
- School No. 479 Cristóbal Colón
- School No. 480 Mariano Moreno
- School No. 481 Bartolomé Mitre
- School No. 482 Manuel Belgrano
- School No. 652 Villa Podio
- School No. 851 Ángela de la Casa
- School No. 886 Brigadier General Estanislao López
- School No. 1136 Paul Harris
- School No. 1186 Dr. Lisandro de la Torre
- School No. 1247 Centenario de Rafaela
- School No. 1287 Juan Domingo Perón
- School No. 1316 Don Tomás
- School No. 1343 Amancay
- School No. 1351 Madre Teresa de Calcuta
- School No. 1359 Juan Bautista Languier
- School No. 1361 Ángela Peralta Pino
- School No. 1393 Barrio 2 de Abril
- School No. 6393 Pablo Pizzurno
- School No. 6405 Gabriela Mistral
- Private School No. 1025 Nuestra Señora de la Misericordia
- Private School No. 1075 25 de Mayo
- Private School No. 1108 San José
- Escuela No. 1331 De la Plaza

==== Secondary Schools ====
- Secondary School No. 204 Domingo de Oro
- Secondary School No. 376 Joaquín Dopazo
- Secondary School No. 428 Luisa Raimondi de Barreiro
- Secondary School No. 429 Mario Vecchioli
- Secondary School No. 505 Mahatma Gandhi
- Secondary School No. 613 Alicia Cattáneo
- Secondary School No. 615 Luis Alberto Spinetta
- Secondary School for Adults No. 1007 Libertad
- Technical Secondary School No. 460 Guillermo Lehmann
- Technical Secondary School No. 495 Malvinas Argentinas
- Technical Secondary School No. 654 Dr. Nicolás Avellaneda
- Private Secondary School No. 3091 De la Plaza
- Private Secondary School No. 3128 25 de Mayo
- Private Secondary School No. 8022 Nuestra Señora de la Misericordia
- Private Secondary School No. 8140 San José

==== Special Education Schools and Centers ====
- Special School No. 2079 for the Hearing Impaired
- Special School No. 1260 A.P.A.D.I.R.
- Special School No. 2027 Melvin Jones
- Special School No. 2107 for the Visually Impaired Prof. Susana Crespo
- Fundación Espacios de Aprendizaje y Capacitación
- Fundación para el Aprendizaje y Trabajo del Discapacitado (FAD) / Camino de Luz Protected Workshop
- Centro Especial La Huella
- Special School No. 2082 for Vocational Training
- Special School No. 2129 for the Mentally Disabled

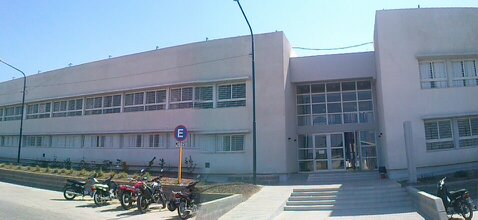
Instituto No. 2 de Rafaela

Tertiary Institutions

- Instituto Superior del Profesorado No. 2 Joaquín V. González (ISP2)
- School of Nursing - Rafaela Branch
- Instituto Tecnológico Rafaela (ITEC)

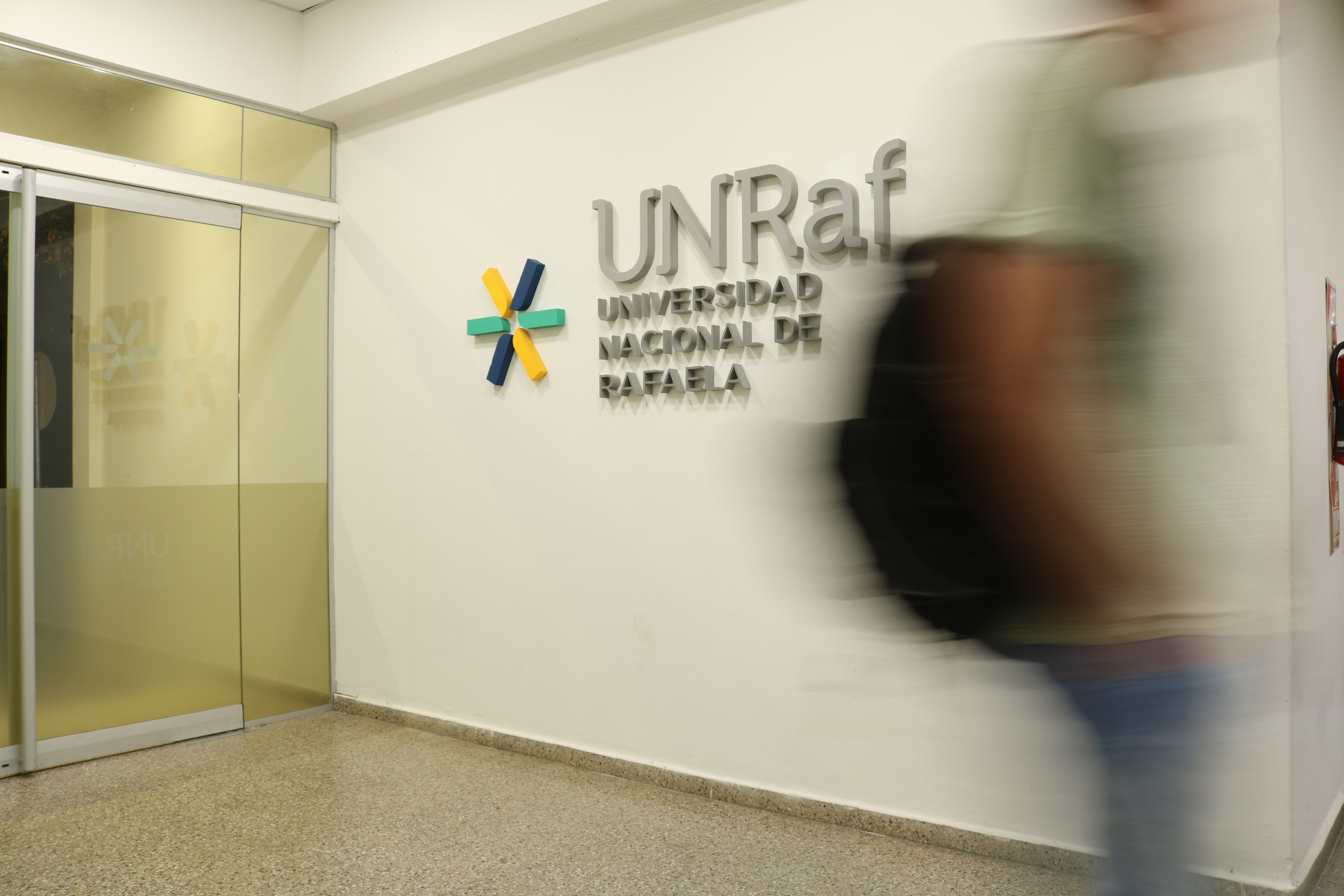
National University of Rafaela

==== Universities ====
- National University of Rafaela (UNRAF)
- National Technological University (UTN) - Rafaela Regional Faculty
- University of Business and Social Sciences (UCES) - Rafaela Campus
- Catholic University of Santiago del Estero (UCSE) - Rafaela Academic Department
- Catholic University of Santa Fe (UCSF) - Rafaela Campus

== Sports ==
=== Football ===
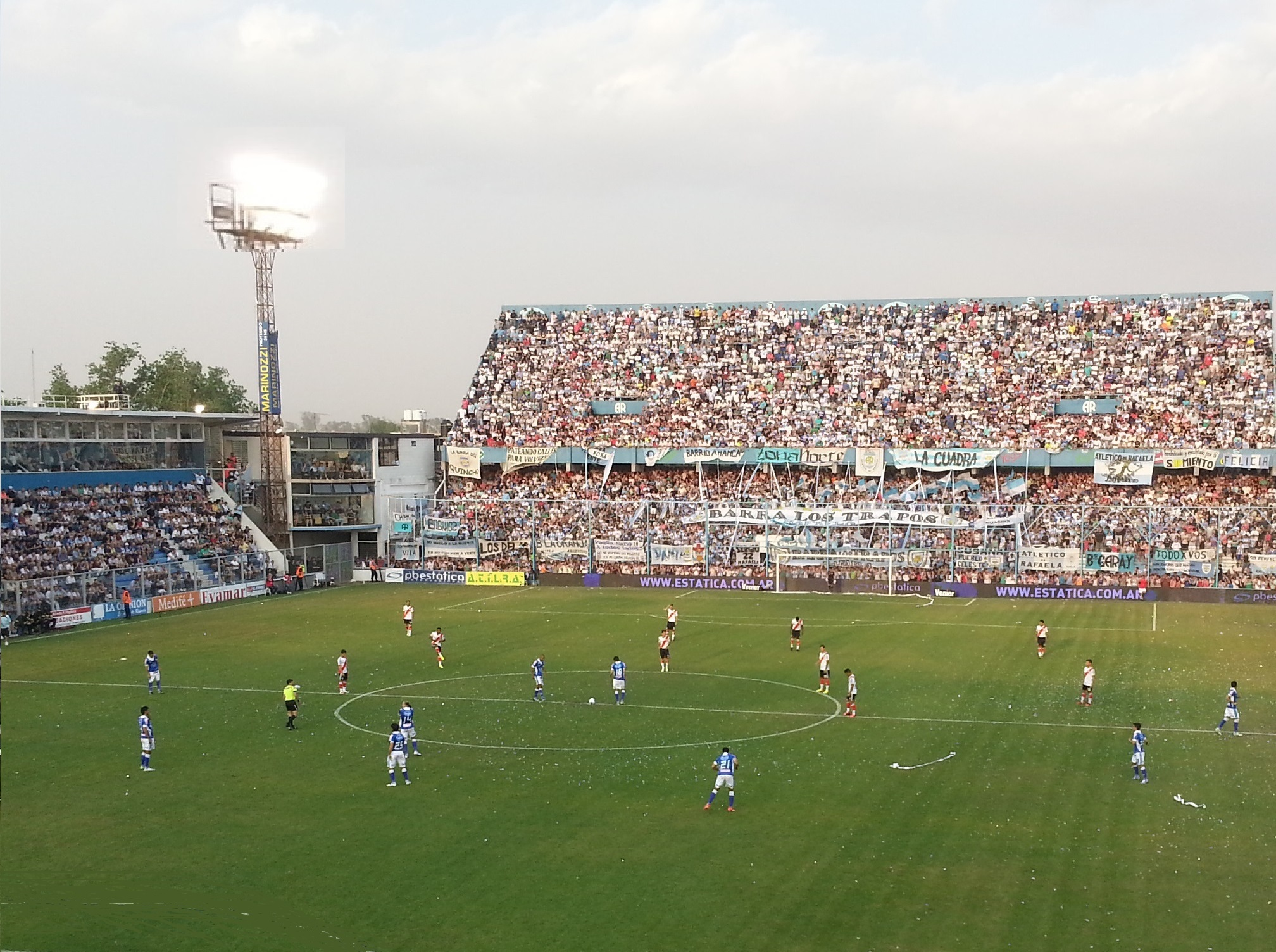
Estadio Club Atlético de Rafaela

As in most of the country, football is the most popular sport in Rafaela, drawing the largest crowds.

The main football teams in the city are:

- Atlético de Rafaela, which played in the Argentine Primera División during the 2003/2004 season, ascended again in 2011, and was relegated to the Primera B Nacional in 2017.
- Club Sportivo Ben Hur, which participated in the Primera B Nacional between 2005 and 2008, currently competing in the Torneo Regional Federal Amateur.
- Club Atlético 9 de Julio, which competes in the Torneo Federal A.

Club	Foundation	League	Stadium	Capacity
Atlético de Rafaela	1907	Primera B Nacional	Nuevo Monumental	20,660
Club Atlético 9 de Julio	1904	Torneo Federal A	Germán Solterman	8,000
Club Sportivo Ben Hur	1940	Torneo Regional Federal Amateur	Néstor Zenklusen	11,500
Club Peñarol	1936	Torneo Regional Federal Amateur	República de Villa Rosas	2,000
Club Sportivo Norte	1931	Torneo Regional Federal Amateur	Sportivo Norte	1,400
Club Atlético Ferrocarril del Estado	1939	Torneo Regional Federal Amateur	Los Nogales	
Club Atlético Argentino Quilmes	1916	Liga Rafaelina	Agustín Giuliani	4,000
Club Atlético Juventud	1905	Liga Rafaelina		

Similar to other cities, Rafaela has its own football league, the Liga Rafaelina de Fútbol, which includes clubs from Rafaela and Sunchales as well as teams from nearby towns. The league is divided into three categories: Primera A, Primera B (split into North and South zones), and Primera C.

=== Basketball ===
In basketball, Ben Hur stood out by competing in the first division of the Liga Nacional de Básquet, where it won a championship and the title of champion in the South American Basketball League.

=== Motorsports ===
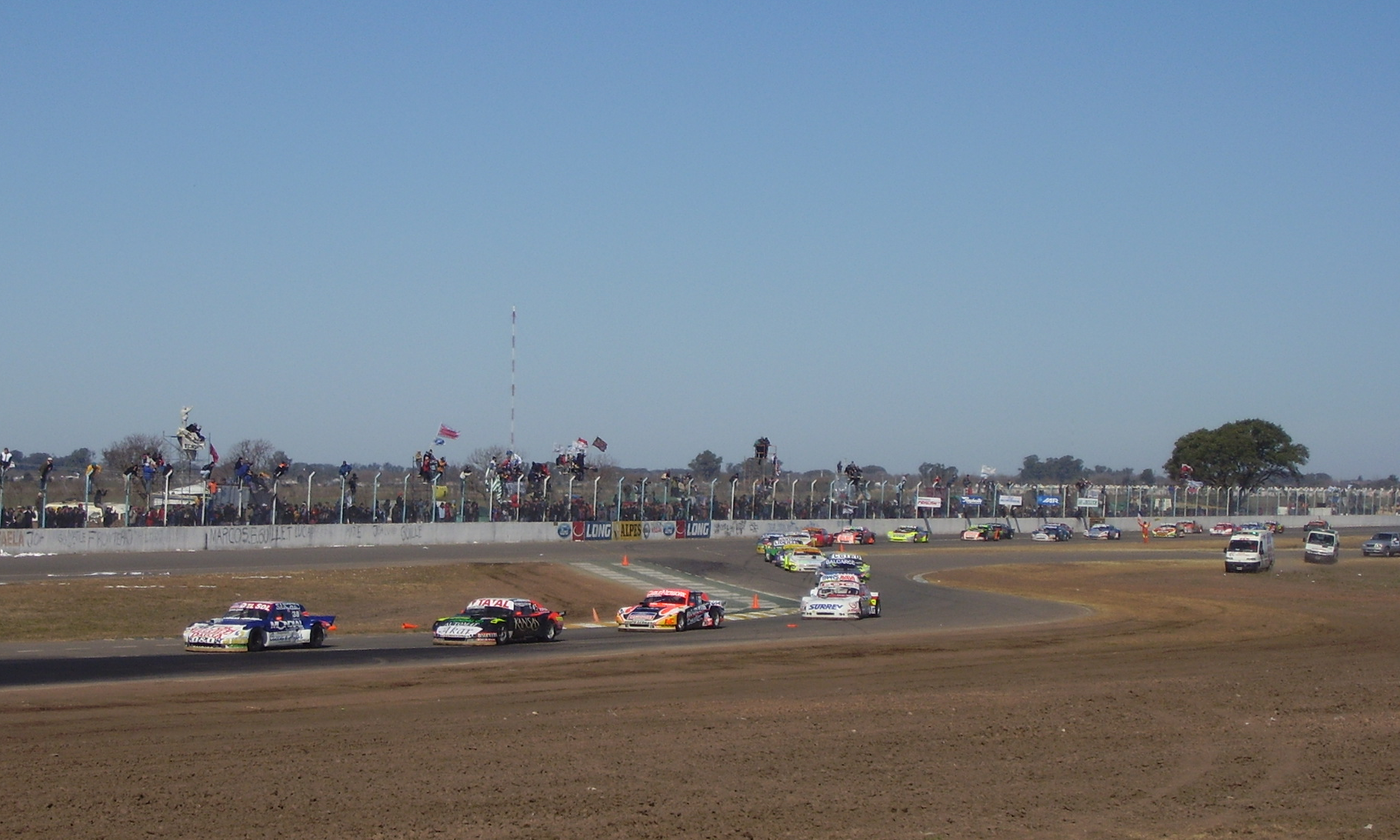
Autódromo Ciudad de Rafaela during a Turismo Carretera race in 2007.

The Atlético de Rafaela club has organized motorsport races since 1919. The 500 Millas Argentinas races were held there from 1954 to 1975. The club inaugurated the Autódromo Ciudad de Rafaela in 1953, which has hosted competitions such as Turismo Carretera and TC 2000.

The track is popularly known as "the temple of speed" due to its characteristic oval shape, where the Argentine speed record was set. Gabriel Ponce de León, driving a Honda Civic (STC2000 category), reached 306.38 km/h in 2012.

=== Rugby and Hockey ===
The city also has a rugby team called Círculo Rafaelino de Rugby (CRAR). Additionally, within the same institution, the various categories of the hockey team, both female and male, and the women's rugby team are notable. It has produced three Pumas players: Hugo Berra, Mayco Vivas, and Pedro Rubiolo.

=== Cycling ===
Rafaela has a velodrome called "Héctor Cassina" at the Club Ciclista de Rafaela, inaugurated in 1991. The city already had a rich history in road cycling, and since then, it has also fostered track cycling, achieving many national and international successes.

== Culture ==
=== Cinemas and Theaters ===
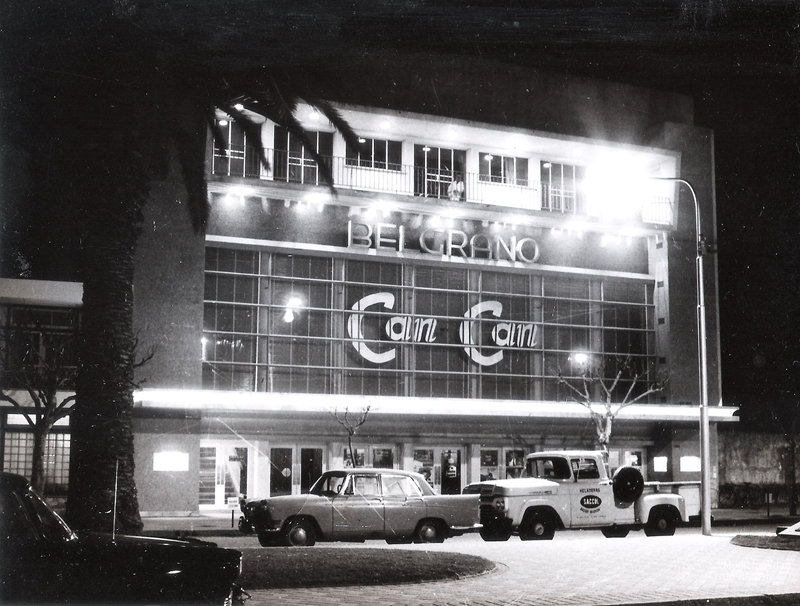
Cine Teatro Municipal Manuel Belgrano

Rafaela boasts modern cinemas featuring the latest releases. The city's theater offers a continuous variety of theatrical and musical performances recognized locally, provincially, nationally, and internationally.

- Anfiteatro Alfredo Williner
- Teatro Juan Lasserre
- Cine Teatro Municipal Manuel Belgrano
- Cine Las Tipas
- Centro Cultural La Máscara
- Centro Cultural Municipal - Sociedad Italiana Víctor Manuel II

=== Museums ===
The city has 11 museums showcasing various cultural and historical aspects.

Some of the most important museums include:

- Museo Histórico Municipal
- Museo Municipal de Arte Dr. Urbano Poggi: Founded in 1969, it is an exponent of Rafaela's art and also hosts exhibitions that usually tour the country.
- Museo Municipal Usina del Pueblo
- Museo de la Fotografía: Founded in 1987, it is one of the first photography museums in the country with proper facilities, including a specialized library, laboratory, temporary exhibition hall, and archive.
- Museo Ferroviario de Rafaela: Created by the Association of Ferromodelists and Friends of the Railway.
- Museo de la Música y el Sonido: Located at Hipólito Yrigoyen 1653, created and directed by musician Sergio Grazioli.

=== Libraries ===
- Biblioteca Municipal "Lermo Rafael Balbi"
- Biblioteca Popular "Arco iris"
- Biblioteca Popular "Domingo Faustino Sarmiento"
- Biblioteca Popular "Dr. Ricardo Gutiérrez"
- Biblioteca Popular "José Manuel Estrada"
- Biblioteca Popular "Monseñor Antonio Brasca"

== Notable Personalities ==
Rafaela has been the birthplace of numerous notable individuals across various fields:

- Hermes Binner †: Twice mayor of Rosario and former governor of Santa Fe province.
- Javier Frana: Professional tennis player.
- Ricardo Lorenzetti: Former President of the Argentine Supreme Court of Justice.
- Sebastián Porto: Former professional motorcycle racer.
- María Emilia Salerni: Professional tennis player.
- Lucas Aveldaño: Professional soccer player.
- Silvia Bertolaccini: Former LPGA professional golf player and current ESPN announcer for Latin America.
- Denis Stracqualursi: Professional soccer player.
- Grillo Demo: Contemporary artist.
- Axel Werner: Professional footballer.
- Alejandro Donatti
- Ángelo Martino
- Fabricio Fontanini
- Facundo Colidio
- Florencia Molinero
- Mayco Vivas
- Melisa Gretter
- Tomás Pochettino

== Sister Cities ==
Rafaela is twinned with the following cities around the world:

- Sigmaringendorf, Germany (since 1994)
- Fossano, Italy (since 1997)
- Carcabuey, Spain (since 2013)
