= 2019–20 Primera Nacional =

35th season of the second-tier football league in Argentina

Primera Nacional
- Season: 2019–20
- Dates: 15 August 2019 – 28 April 2020
- Champions: None; abandoned
- Matches: 333
- Goals: 691 (2.08 per match)
- Top goalscorer: Pablo Magnín (15 goals)

The 2019–20 Argentine Primera B Nacional, also known as the 2019–20 Primera Nacional, was the 35th season of the Primera B Nacional, the second tier of Argentine football. The season began on 15 August 2019 and was scheduled to end in May 2020. Thirty-two teams compete in the league, twenty-one returning from the 2018–19 season, four teams that were relegated from Primera División, two teams promoted from Federal A and five from B Metropolitana.

Due to the COVID-19 pandemic, the Argentine Football Association suspended the tournament on 17 March 2020. On 28 April 2020 AFA announced the abandonment of the competition as well as the culmination of the 2019–20 season in all of its leagues, with no clubs promoted or relegated. AFA also announced that a decision on a suitable method for promotion from the Primera Nacional and lower tiers would be reached in due time.

== Club information ==
=== Stadia and locations ===
Locations of the 2019–20 Primera B Nacional teams outside Greater Buenos Aires.
Locations of the 2019–20 Primera B Nacional teams within Greater Buenos Aires.

Club	City	Stadium
Agropecuario Argentino	Carlos Casares	Ofelia Rosenzuaig
All Boys	Buenos Aires	Islas Malvinas
Almagro	José Ingenieros	Tres de Febrero
Alvarado	Mar del Plata	José María Minella
Atlanta	Buenos Aires	Don León Kolbowsky
Atlético de Rafaela	Rafaela	Nuevo Monumental
Belgrano	Córdoba	Julio César Villagra
Barracas Central	Buenos Aires	Claudio Chiqui Tapia
Brown	Adrogué	Lorenzo Arandilla
Chacarita Juniors	Villa Maipú	Chacarita Juniors
Defensores de Belgrano	Buenos Aires	Juan Pasquale
Deportivo Morón	Morón	Nuevo Francisco Urbano
Deportivo Riestra	Buenos Aires	Guillermo Laza
Estudiantes	Caseros	Ciudad de Caseros
Estudiantes	Río Cuarto	Antonio Candini
Ferro Carril Oeste	Buenos Aires	Arquitecto Ricardo Etcheverry
Gimnasia y Esgrima	Jujuy	23 de Agosto
Gimnasia y Esgrima	Mendoza	Víctor Legrotaglie
Guillermo Brown	Puerto Madryn	Raúl Conti
Independiente Rivadavia	Mendoza	Bautista Gargantini
Instituto	Córdoba	Presidente Perón
Mitre	Santiago del Estero	Doctores José y Antonio Castiglione
Nueva Chicago	Buenos Aires	Nueva Chicago
Platense	Florida Este	Ciudad de Vicente López
Quilmes	Quilmes	Centenario
San Martín	San Juan	Ingeniero Hilario Sánchez
San Martín	San Juan	Estadio del Bicentenario
San Martín	Tucumán	La Ciudadela
Santamarina	Tandil	Municipal Gral. San Martín
Sarmiento	Junín	Eva Perón
Temperley	Temperley	Alfredo Beranger
Tigre	Victoria	José Dellagiovanna
Villa Dálmine	Campana	Villa Dálmine

== Zone A ==
Pos	Team	Pld	W	D	L	GF	GA	GD	Pts
1	Atlanta	20	11	5	4	33	20	+13	38
2	Estudiantes (RC)	21	10	7	4	29	19	+10	37
3	Estudiantes (BA)	21	11	3	7	31	25	+6	36
4	Temperley	21	8	8	5	22	19	+3	32
5	Deportivo Morón	21	9	5	7	19	18	+1	32
6	Ferro Carril Oeste	21	9	4	8	20	20	0	31
7	Platense	21	9	3	9	22	25	−3	30
8	Agropecuario Argentino	21	8	5	8	23	19	+4	29
9	San Martín (SJ)	21	7	7	7	19	22	−3	28
10	Belgrano	21	5	12	4	26	25	+1	27
11	Alvarado	21	7	5	9	27	28	−1	26
12	Guillermo Brown	21	6	7	8	18	21	−3	25
13	Independiente Rivadavia	20	6	6	8	26	28	−2	24
14	Barracas Central	21	5	6	10	19	26	−7	21
15	Mitre (SdE)	21	3	8	10	11	19	−8	17
16	Nueva Chicago (Note: Nueva Chicago were deducted one point as punishment for crowd disturbances in their home match against Temperley.)	21	2	11	8	16	27	−11	16

Source: AFA
Rules for classification: 1) points; 2) play-off (only for deciding promotion or relegation); 3) goal difference; 4) goals scored; 5) head-to-head points; 6) head-to-head goal difference; 7) head-to-head goals scored.

=== Results ===
Home \ Away	AGA	ALV	ATL	BAC	BEL	DMO	EBA	ERC	FCO	GBR	IND	MIT	NCH	PLA	SMA	TEM
Agropecuario Argentino	—	1–0	2–2	2–0	1–0	0–1	0–1	1–2	—	3–0	—	2–0	—	0–2	0–0	
Alvarado	1–2	—	1–2	2–0	—	2–4	4–2	3–2	—	0–0	0–3	2–0	—	2–0	—	0–2
Atlanta	—	—	—	1–1	4–2	—	—	1–2	2–1	2–1	4–1	1–0	2–0	—	3–1	1–1
Barracas Central	1–0	2–2	—	—	2–3	—	3–4	—	0–0	1–1	1–0	—	2–1	—	2–0	0–1
Belgrano	1–1	2–2	—	1–0	—	1–0	—	—	2–2	—	2–2	1–1	1–1	1–1	1–1	3–1
Deportivo Morón	—	1–0	1–0	1–0	1–1	—	1–0	1–3	—	1–0	—	—	0–0	0–1	1–1	—
Estudiantes (BA)	1–0	—	1–2	2–0	0–0	1–0	—	0–1	—	1–1	—	3–2	—	1–2	5–3	2–2
Estudiantes (RC)	—	—	1–0	0–0	1–1	—	—	—	2–1	3–1	3–1	0–0	—	3–2	0–1	3–0
Ferro Carril Oeste	0–1	1–0	0–2	—	—	1–0	1–0	2–1	—	—	1–0	0–0	2–1	0–2	—	—
Guillermo Brown	—	—	0–0	0–2	2–1	1–2	—	—	2–0	—	1–0	0–1	2–0	1–1	0–0	0–1
Independiente Rivadavia	1–1	3–2	—	—	—	2–1	0–2	0–0	3–2	0–0	—	—	4–1	4–1	—	—
Mitre (SdE)	2–1	—	0–1	4–2	—	1–1	0–1	0–0	0–1	—	0–0	—	—	0–1	0–1	0–1
Nueva Chicago	1–3	0–1	2–2	—	—	0–0	2–1	1–1	1–1	—	1–1	0–0	—	1–1	—	1–1
Platense	—	0–2	2–1	1–0	1–0	—	—	3–1	0–3	1–2	—	—	0–1	—	0–1	0–1
San Martín (SJ)	3–2	1–1	—	0–0	0–1	0–2	0–1	—	1–0	—	3–1	0–0	1–0	—	—	1–2
Temperley	0–0	0–0	—	—	1–1	3–0	1–2	0–0	0–1	1–3	2–0	—	1–1	—	—	—

Source: AFA
Legend: Blue = home team win; Yellow = draw; Red = away team win.

== Zone B ==
Pos	Team	Pld	W	D	L	GF	GA	GD	Pts
1	San Martín (T)	21	13	5	3	33	13	+20	44
2	Defensores de Belgrano	21	11	8	2	25	13	+12	41
3	Sarmiento (J)	20	9	7	4	31	21	+10	34
4	Deportivo Riestra	21	8	9	4	15	14	+1	33
5	Tigre	20	8	4	8	24	21	+3	28
6	Atlético de Rafaela	21	7	7	7	27	30	−3	28
7	Gimnasia y Esgrima (M)	20	7	6	7	20	20	0	27
8	Villa Dálmine	21	7	5	9	19	18	+1	26
9	Instituto	21	6	7	8	26	24	+2	25
10	Brown	21	5	9	7	18	22	−4	24
11	Quilmes	21	5	9	7	19	24	−5	24
12	Chacarita Juniors	21	6	6	9	15	26	−11	24
13	Almagro	21	5	8	8	13	20	−7	23
14	All Boys	21	5	7	9	17	23	−6	22
15	Santamarina	20	4	8	8	15	19	−4	20
16	Gimnasia y Esgrima (J)	21	4	7	10	13	22	−9	19

Source: AFA
Rules for classification: 1) points; 2) play-off (only for deciding promotion or relegation); 3) goal difference; 4) goals scored; 5) head-to-head points; 6) head-to-head goal difference; 7) head-to-head goals scored.

=== Results ===
Home \ Away	ALL	ALM	ATR	BRO	CHA	DBE	DRI	GEJ	GEM	INS	QUI	SMT	SAN	SAR	TIG	VDA
All Boys	—	—	2–1	0–3	1–1	0–1	2–0	—	—	—	1–0	1–1	1–1	—	2–1	0–1
Almagro	1–0	—	—	—	0–0	—	0–2	—	0–1	—	2–1	0–1	1–0	0–0	0–3	0–0
Atlético de Rafaela	3–2	3–1	—	2–0	2–0	1–3	—	2–0	1–5	3–2	0–0	—	—	1–1	1–2	—
Brown	2–1	1–1	1–1	—	0–1	0–0	—	0–1	1–1	0–3	—	1–0	0–0	1–1	—	—
Chacarita Juniors	0–0	1–2	—	—	—	—	1–1	0–0	1–0	1–0	1–0	2–2	0–3	—	0–3	1–0
Defensores de Belgrano	0–2	1–1	2–2	—	2–1	—	—	3–2	1–0	1–1	2–0	—	1–0	3–0	2–1	—
Deportivo Riestra	—	1–0	1–0	1–0	—	0–0	—	2–1	0–0	0–0	—	0–1	1–0	2–2	—	1–1
Gimnasia y Esgrima (J)	0–0	0–0	—	1–1	2–1	0–1	0–1	—	—	3–0	0–0	—	—	1–3	0–0	—
Gimnasia y Esgrima (M)	0–0	1–0	1–2	—	—	0–0	—	2–0	—	2–1	0–0	0–3	1–0	—	—	3–1
Instituto	1–1	2–1	—	1–1	1–0	—	0–0	—	—	—	1–1	—	2–0	2–3	3–0	1–2
Quilmes	3–1	—	1–1	1–1	—	1–0	1–1	1–0	2–2	—	—	1–4	0–0	—	2–1	1–2
San Martín (T)	—	1–1	3–0	2–0	0–1	0–0	2–0	2–0	—	1–1	—	—	—	2–0	—	1–0
Santamarina	—	—	1–1	2–1	2–1	1–2	0–1	0–0	—	—	—	1–3	—	1–1	—	2–1
Sarmiento (J)	1–0	0–1	—	—	5–1	—	—	—	4–1	2–1	3–1	3–1	0–0	—	1–1	1–0
Tigre	2–0	—	2–0	1–2	—	—	0–0	3–1	1–0	0–3	1–2	0–1	1–1	—	—	1–0
Villa Dálmine	—	1–1	0–0	1–2	—	0–0	3–0	0–1	2–0	2–0	—	1–2	—	1–0	—	—

Source: AFA
Legend: Blue = home team win; Yellow = draw; Red = away team win.

== Season statistics ==
=== Top scorers ===
Rank	Player	Club	Goals
1	(Argentina) Pablo Magnín	Sarmiento (J)	15
2	(Argentina) Pablo Vegetti	Belgrano	14
3	(Argentina) Luciano Pons	San Martín (T)	12
4	(Argentina) Germán Rivero	Alvarado	11
5	(Argentina) Luis Eduardo López	Atlanta	10
6	(Argentina) Martín Comachi	Agropecuario Argentino	9
6	(Argentina) Mateo Bajamich	Instituto	9
8	(Argentina) Emanuel Dening	Tigre	8
9	(Argentina) Ijiel Protti	Atlético de Rafaela	7
9	(Argentina) Francisco González	Estudiantes (BA)	7
9	(Argentina) Bruno Sepúlveda	Estudiantes (RC)	7
9	(Argentina) Gonzalo Castillejos	Gimnasia y Esgrima (J)	7
9	(Argentina) Leandro González	Quilmes	7
9	(Argentina) Nicolás Messiniti	Temperley	7

== See also ==
- 2019–20 Argentine Primera División
- 2019–20 Torneo Federal A
- 2019–20 Copa Argentina
