= 2019–20 Aldosivi season =

Aldosivi
2019–20 season
- President: José Moscuzza
- Manager: Gustavo Álvarez
- Stadium: Estadio José María Minella
- Top goalscorer: League: Nazareno Solís (2); All: Nazareno Solís (2)

The 2019–20 season is Aldosivi's 2nd consecutive season in the top division of Argentine football. In addition to the Primera División, the club are competing in the Copa Argentina and Copa de la Superliga.

The season generally covers the period from 1 July 2019 to 30 June 2020.

== Review ==
=== Pre-season ===
On 13 June 2019, Aldosivi announced the signing of Leandro Maciel, who would join officially in July on loan from Lanús. Days after, the signings of defenders Marcos Miers and Fernando Evangelista were revealed by the club. 14 June saw Jefferson Mena join Rionegro Águilas. Their first outgoing was publicised in the preceding May, with goalkeeper Matías Vega agreeing a move to Primera B Nacional's Deportivo Riestra. Estudiantes' Gastón Gil Romero was snapped up on loan on 24 June, while Manuel Capasso did the opposite as he was loaned out to Platense. Cain Fara, a centre-back from Ferro Carril Oeste, joined on 25 June. Luciano Perdomo became their third departure on 26 June to Chacarita Juniors. Jonatan Benedetti returned from loan on 30 June.

Players who were in on loan last campaign returned to their parent clubs on and around 30 June. Left-back Lucas Kruspzky signed for Santamarina on 1 July. Juan Galeano moved away from Aldosivi on 2 July, penning a contract with newly-promoted Primera División outfit Central Córdoba; Ismael Quílez did likewise on 4 July. A sixth new signing was confirmed on 2 July, as Nazareno Solís was loaned from Boca Juniors. Consecutive 2–2 draws were played out in friendlies with Temperley on 6 July. Cristian Chávez was sold on 8 July, with fellow Primera División team Independiente buying him. Sebastián Rincón came in on loan from Vitória Guimarães of the Primeira Liga on 10 July. Aldosivi met Ferro Carril Oeste in matches on 10 July, losing both times.

Also on 10 July, Matías Pisano agreed to head to Colombia with América de Cali. Federico Andrada was next through the door for Aldosivi, as the centre-forward penned terms from Unión Santa Fe. They suffered a 4–0 defeat away to Independiente on 13 July. Juan Silva was captured by Villa San Carlos on 15 July, while Hernán Burbano arrived from Atlas later that day. Dardo Miloc went off to Patronato on 16 July. Román Martínez joined from San Lorenzo on 18 July, as Lucas Villalba made his loan spell permanent. Jonatan Benedetti headed back out on loan on 18 July, linking with All Boys. Quilmes beat Aldosivi in two friendlies on 20 July. Francisco Grahl, a player most recently with San Martín, secured a permanent deal with Aldosivi on 22 July.

Facundo Bertoglio, coming from Greece's Lamia, penned a contract with Aldosivi on 23 July.

=== July ===
Aldosivi's Primera División season started with a loss away to Estudiantes, with Jonathan Schunke condemning them to defeat on 29 July. On 30 July, Denis Stracqualursi headed to Atlético de Rafaela. On the same day, Estudiantes revealed a loan deal had been agreed with Aldosivi for Nicolás Bazzana; medical dependant. 31 July saw Bazzana officially join.

=== August ===
Gonzalo Verón completed a loan move from Independiente on 1 August. Argentinos Juniors visited Aldosivi's Estadio José María Minella in the Primera División on 3 August, subsequently taking a point away following a goalless tie. Gonzalo Verón gave Aldosivi a friendly victory over Atlético Camioneros on 9 August, though it was followed by a 1–2 defeat to the same opponents hours later. On 16 August, Super League Greece 2 side Apollon Smyrnis communicated the signing of Javier Iritier. Aldosivi failed to win any of their first three league fixtures, after extending their streak on 18 August with a defeat at La Bombonera to Boca Juniors. Aldosivi got their opening three points on the board on 26 August, as they thrashed Atlético Tucumán by three goals at home in Mar del Plata.

=== September ===
Aldosivi lost away to Talleres in the Primera División on 1 September, despite Nazareno Solís putting them ahead within the first minute.

== Squad ==
Squad No.	Nationality	Name	Position(s)	Date of birth (age)	Signed from
Goalkeepers
1	Argentina	Luciano Pocrnjic	GK	4 August 1981 (age 45)	Newell's Old Boys
31	Argentina	Luis Ingolotti	GK	14 January 2000 (age 26)	Academy
35	Argentina	Fabián Assmann	GK	23 March 1986 (age 40)	Agropecuario
Defenders
2	Argentina	Cain Fara	CB	6 March 1994 (age 32)	Ferro Carril Oeste
6	Argentina	Leonel Galeano	CB	2 August 1991 (age 35)	Godoy Cruz
16	Argentina	Leonardo Sánchez	CB	2 August 1986 (age 40)	Unión Santa Fe
19	Paraguay	Marcos Miers	CB	24 March 1990 (age 36)	Deportivo Lara
20	Argentina	Fernando Evangelista	LB	21 October 1991 (age 35)	Estudiantes
21	Argentina	Emanuel Iñiguez	CB	16 September 1996 (age 30)	Academy
23	Argentina	Lucas Villalba	LB	19 August 1994 (age 32)	Independiente
26	Argentina	Leandro Sapetti	LB	30 January 1989 (age 37)	Villa Dálmine
27	Argentina	Nicolás Bazzana	CB	23 February 1996 (age 30)	Estudiantes (loan)
Midfielders
5	Argentina	Gastón Gil Romero	CM	6 May 1993 (age 33)	Estudiantes (loan)
8	Uruguay	Federico Gino	CM	26 February 1993 (age 33)	All Boys
7	Argentina	Nazareno Solís	AM	22 April 1994 (age 32)	Boca Juniors (loan)
9	Argentina	Alan Ruiz	AM	19 August 1993 (age 33)	Sporting CP (loan)
11	Colombia	Hernán Burbano	AM	5 March 1988 (age 38)	Atlas
15	Argentina	Román Martínez	DM	27 March 1983 (age 43)	San Lorenzo
17	Argentina	Ramiro Garay	MF	6 March 1997 (age 29)	Academy
18	Argentina	Facundo Bertoglio	AM	30 June 1990 (age 36)	Lamia
25	Argentina	Nahuel Yeri	RM	12 September 1991 (age 35)	Banfield
32	Argentina	Jonathan Farías	MF	27 March 1998 (age 28)	Club Brugge
33	Argentina	Leandro Maciel	CM	29 December 1995 (age 30)	Lanús (loan)
36	Argentina	Joaquín Indacoechea	MF	8 September 2000 (age 26)	Academy
39	Argentina	Yoel Juárez	MF	20 March 2002 (age 24)	Academy
87	Argentina	Ezequiel Videla	DM	15 January 1988 (age 38)	Guaraní
	Argentina	Fernando Godoy	CM	1 May 1990 (age 36)	Talleres
	Argentina	Francisco Grahl	AM	5 March 1992 (age 34)	San Martín
Forwards
10	Argentina	Federico Andrada	CF	3 March 1994 (age 32)	Unión Santa Fe
14	Colombia	Sebastián Rincón	CF	14 January 1994 (age 32)	Vitória Guimarães (loan)
29	Argentina	Gonzalo Verón	CF	24 December 1989 (age 36)	Independiente (loan)
30	Argentina	Franco Pérez	CF	4 January 1998 (age 28)	Academy
	Argentina	Francisco Leonardo	FW	12 April 1996 (age 30)	Academy
Out on loan					Loaned to
	Argentina	Jonatan Benedetti	FW	26 March 1997 (age 29)	All Boys
	Argentina	Manuel Capasso	CB	19 April 1996 (age 30)	Platense
	Argentina	Lucas Di Yorio	CF	22 November 1996 (age 29)	L.D.U. Portoviejo

== Transfers ==
Domestic transfer windows:
3 July 2019 to 24 September 2019
20 January 2020 to 19 February 2020.

=== Transfers in ===
Date from	Position	Nationality	Name	From	Ref.
1 July 2019	CB	Argentina	Cain Fara	Ferro Carril Oeste (Note: Released by Ferro Carril Oeste on 30 June.)	
3 July 2019 (Note: Deal agreed on 13 June 2019)	CB	Paraguay	Marcos Miers	Deportivo Lara	
3 July 2019 (Note: Deal agreed on 14 June 2019)	LB	Argentina	Fernando Evangelista	Estudiantes	
11 July 2019	CF	Argentina	Federico Andrada	Unión Santa Fe	
15 July 2019	AM	Colombia	Hernán Burbano	Atlas	
18 July 2019	DM	Argentina	Román Martínez	San Lorenzo	
18 July 2019	LB	Argentina	Lucas Villalba	Independiente	
22 July 2019	AM	Argentina	Francisco Grahl	San Martín	
23 July 2019	AM	Argentina	Facundo Bertoglio	Lamia	

=== Transfers out ===
Date from	Position	Nationality	Name	To	Ref.
3 July 2019 (Note: Deal agreed on 31 May 2019)	GK	Argentina	Matías Vega	Deportivo Riestra	
3 July 2019 (Note: Deal agreed on 26 June 2019)	CM	Argentina	Luciano Perdomo	Chacarita Juniors	
3 July 2019 (Note: Deal agreed on 1 July 2019)	LB	Argentina	Lucas Kruspzky	Santamarina	
3 July 2019 (Note: Deal agreed on 2 July 2019)	CM	Argentina	Juan Galeano	Central Córdoba	
4 July 2019	RB	Argentina	Ismael Quílez	Central Córdoba	
8 July 2019 (Note: Deal agreed on 14 June 2019)	RB	Colombia	Jefferson Mena	Rionegro Águilas	
8 July 2019	LW	Argentina	Cristian Chávez	Independiente	
10 July 2019	RW	Argentina	Matías Pisano	América de Cali	
15 July 2019	DM	Argentina	Juan Silva	Villa San Carlos	
16 July 2019	CM	Argentina	Dardo Miloc	Patronato	
30 July 2019	CF	Argentina	Denis Stracqualursi	Atlético de Rafaela	
16 August 2019	AM	Argentina	Javier Iritier	Apollon Smyrnis	

=== Loans in ===
Start date	Position	Nationality	Name	From	End date	Ref.
3 July 2019 (Note: Deal agreed on 12 June 2019)	CM	Argentina	Leandro Maciel	Lanús	30 June 2018	
3 July 2019 (Note: Deal agreed on 24 June 2019)	CM	Argentina	Gastón Gil Romero	Estudiantes	30 June 2018	
3 July 2019 (Note: Deal agreed on 2 July 2019)	AM	Argentina	Nazareno Solís	Boca Juniors	30 June 2018	
10 July 2019	CF	Colombia	Sebastián Rincón	Vitória Guimarães	30 June 2018	
31 July 2019	CB	Argentina	Nicolás Bazzana	Estudiantes	30 June 2020	
1 August 2019	CF	Argentina	Gonzalo Verón	Independiente	30 June 2020	

=== Loans out ===
Start date	Position	Nationality	Name	To	End date	Ref.
3 July 2019 (Note: Deal agreed on 24 June 2019)	CB	Argentina	Manuel Capasso	Platense	30 June 2020	
18 July 2019	FW	Argentina	Jonatan Benedetti	All Boys	30 June 2020	

== Friendlies ==
=== Pre-season ===
Primera B Nacional's Quilmes scheduled pre-season friendlies with Aldosivi on 20 June 2019, with the matches set for 20 July in Mar del Plata. Aldosivi announced a slate of three friendlies on 24 June, as fixtures were set against Temperley (6 July), Independiente (13 July) and an opponent to be named (17 July) - though the latter was cancelled. Ferro Carril Oeste set a game with Aldosivi on 1 July.

Win Draw Loss

6 July 2019 Friendly	Aldosivi	2–2	Temperley	Mar del Plata, Argentina
	N. Solís; J. Galeano	Aldosivi; La Capital MdP; 60 min. match	A. Vega 5'; F. Ayunta	Referee: Daniel Luján (Argentina)

6 July 2019 Friendly	Aldosivi	2–2	Temperley	Mar del Plata, Argentina
	F. Tobares; Y. Juárez	Aldosivi; La Capital MdP	N. Messiniti; T. Reinhart

10 July 2019 Friendly	Aldosivi	0–1	Ferro Carril Oeste	Mar del Plata, Argentina
		Grupo La Provincia	E. Díaz	Stadium: Campo Deportivo de Aldosivi

10 July 2019 Friendly	Aldosivi	0–2	Ferro Carril Oeste	Mar del Plata, Argentina
		Grupo La Provincia	B. Barranco; N. Maidana	Stadium: Campo Deportivo de Aldosivi

13 July 2019 Friendly	Independiente	4–0	Aldosivi	Avellaneda, Argentina
	P. Hernández; F. Pizzini; C. Domínguez; M. Benítez	Aldosivi; TyC Sports; 60 min. match		Stadium: Estadio Libertadores de América

17 July 2019 Friendly	Aldosivi	Cancelled	TBA	Argentina

20 July 2019 Friendly	Aldosivi	0–0	Quilmes	Mar del Plata, Argentina
		Aldosivi; 0223		Stadium: Predio Punta Mogotes; Referee: Claudio Comerci (Argentina)

20 July 2019 Friendly	Aldosivi	0–2	Quilmes	Mar del Plata, Argentina
		Aldosivi; 0223	F. Fernández; C. Machado	Stadium: Predio Punta Mogotes

=== Mid-season ===
Two friendlies with Atlético Camioneros were scheduled for 9 August. Aldosivi would travel to face Defensa y Justicia on 7 September.

Win Draw Loss

9 August 2019 Friendly	Aldosivi	1–0	Atlético Camioneros	Mar del Plata, Argentina
	G. Verón			Stadium: Campo Deportivo de Aldosivi; Referee: Osvaldo Buckmeier (Argentina)

9 August 2019 Friendly	Aldosivi	1–2	Atlético Camioneros	Mar del Plata, Argentina
	J. Indacoechea		F. Salinas; E. Chamorro	Stadium: Campo Deportivo de Aldosivi

7 September 2019 Friendly	Defensa y Justicia	–	Aldosivi	Florencio Varela, Argentina

== Competitions ==
=== Primera División ===
==== League table ====
Pos	Team	Pld	W	D	L	GF	GA	GD	Pts
20	Patronato	23	5	8	10	22	34	−12	23
21	Huracán	23	5	7	11	17	27	−10	22
22	Aldosivi	23	6	4	13	20	35	−15	22
23	Colón	23	5	3	15	17	39	−22	18
24	Godoy Cruz	23	6	0	17	22	46	−24	18

Source: AFA
Rules for classification: 1) points; 2) play-off (only if needed to decide championship); 3) goal difference; 4) goals scored; 5) head-to-head points; 6) head-to-head goal difference; 7) head-to-head goals scored.

==== Relegation table ====
Pos	Team	2017–18 Pts	2018–19 Pts	2019–20 Pts	Total Pts	Total Pld	Avg	Relegation
15	Argentinos Juniors	41	22	9	72	57	1.263	
16	Estudiantes (LP)	36	29	6	71	57	1.246	
17	Aldosivi	—	33	4	37	30	1.233	
18	Patronato	33	26	10	69	57	1.211	
19	Newell's Old Boys	29	29	9	67	56	1.196	

Source: AFA

==== Results summary ====
Overall								Home						Away					
Pld	W	D	L	GF	GA	GD	Pts	W	D	L	GF	GA	GD	W	D	L	GF	GA	GD
5	1	1	3	4	5	−1	4	1	1	0	3	0	+3	0	0	3	1	5	−4

Last updated: 2 September 2019.
Source: Soccerway

==== Matches ====
The fixtures for the 2019–20 campaign were released on 10 July.

Win Draw Loss

28 July 2019 1	Estudiantes	1–0	Aldosivi	La Plata, Argentina
11:00 GMT-3	J. Schunke 44'	Aldosivi; Infobae; Soccerway		Stadium: Estadio Ciudad de La Plata; Referee: Fernando Espinoza (Argentina)

3 August 2019 2	Aldosivi	0–0	Argentinos Juniors	Mar del Plata, Argentina
13:15 GMT-3		Aldosivi; Infobae; Soccerway		Stadium: Estadio José María Minella; Referee: Diego Abal (Argentina)

17 August 2019 3	Boca Juniors	2–0	Aldosivi	Buenos Aires, Argentina
20:00 GMT-3	C. Tevez 34'; E. Salvio 78'	Aldosivi; Infobae; Soccerway		Stadium: La Bombonera; Referee: Mauro Vigliano (Argentina)

26 August 2019 4	Aldosivi	3–0	Atlético Tucumán	Mar del Plata, Argentina
19:00 GMT-3	G. Acosta 59' (o.g.); N. Solís 66'; A. Ruiz 90+4' (pen.)	Infobae; Soccerway		Stadium: Estadio José María Minella; Referee: Silvio Trucco (Argentina)

1 September 2019 5	Talleres	2–1	Aldosivi	Córdoba, Argentina
13:15 GMT-3	N. Bustos 17'; Jony 37'	Aldosivi; Infobae; Soccerway	N. Solís 1'	Stadium: Estadio Mario Alberto Kempes; Referee: Andrés Merlos (Argentina)

6	Aldosivi	–	Patronato	Mar del Plata, Argentina
				Stadium: Estadio José María Minella

=== Copa Argentina ===
Win Draw Loss

	–
00:00 GMT-3

=== Copa de la Superliga ===
Win Draw Loss

	–
00:00 GMT-3

== Squad statistics ==
=== Appearances and goals ===
No.	Pos.	Nationality	Name	League		Cup		League Cup		Continental		Total		Discipline		Ref
No.	Pos.	Nationality	Name	Apps	Goals	Apps	Goals	Apps	Goals	Apps	Goals	Apps	Goals	Yellow card	Red card	Ref
1	GK	Argentina	Luciano Pocrnjic	5	0	0	0	0	0	—		5	0	0	0	
2	CB	Argentina	Cain Fara	0	0	0	0	0	0	—		0	0	0	0	
5	CM	Argentina	Gastón Gil Romero	3	0	0	0	0	0	—		3	0	1	0	
6	CB	Argentina	Leonel Galeano	5	0	0	0	0	0	—		5	0	1	0	
7	AM	Argentina	Nazareno Solís	5	2	0	0	0	0	—		5	2	1	0	
8	CM	Uruguay	Federico Gino	5	0	0	0	0	0	—		5	0	1	0	
9	AM	Argentina	Alan Ruiz	0(2)	1	0	0	0	0	—		0(2)	1	0	0	
10	CF	Argentina	Federico Andrada	1(2)	0	0	0	0	0	—		1(2)	0	0	0	
11	AM	Colombia	Hernán Burbano	0(2)	0	0	0	0	0	—		0(2)	0	0	0	
14	CF	Colombia	Sebastián Rincón	2(1)	0	0	0	0	0	—		2(1)	0	0	0	
15	DM	Argentina	Román Martínez	4	0	0	0	0	0	—		4	0	0	0	
16	CB	Argentina	Leonardo Sánchez	0	0	0	0	0	0	—		0	0	0	0	
17	MF	Argentina	Ramiro Garay	0	0	0	0	0	0	—		0	0	0	0	
18	AM	Argentina	Facundo Bertoglio	3	0	0	0	0	0	—		3	0	0	0	
19	CB	Paraguay	Marcos Miers	3	0	0	0	0	0	—		3	0	1	0	
20	LB	Argentina	Fernando Evangelista	0	0	0	0	0	0	—		0	0	0	0	
21	CB	Argentina	Emanuel Iñiguez	5	0	0	0	0	0	—		5	0	0	0	
22	AM	Argentina	Francisco Grahl	0(3)	0	0	0	0	0	—		0(3)	0	0	0	
23	LB	Argentina	Lucas Villalba	5	0	0	0	0	0	—		5	0	1	0	
25	RM	Argentina	Nahuel Yeri	1(1)	0	0	0	0	0	—		1(1)	0	0	0	
26	LB	Argentina	Leandro Sapetti	0	0	0	0	0	0	—		0	0	0	0	
27	CB	Argentina	Nicolás Bazzana	2(1)	0	0	0	0	0	—		2(1)	0	1	0	
29	RW	Argentina	Gonzalo Verón	3(1)	0	0	0	0	0	—		3(1)	0	0	0	
30	CF	Argentina	Franco Pérez	4	0	0	0	0	0	—		4	0	0	0	
31	GK	Argentina	Luis Ingolotti	0	0	0	0	0	0	—		0	0	0	0	
32	MF	Argentina	Jonathan Farías	0	0	0	0	0	0	—		0	0	0	0	
33	CM	Argentina	Leandro Maciel	0(1)	0	0	0	0	0	—		0(1)	0	0	0	
35	GK	Argentina	Fabián Assmann	0	0	0	0	0	0	—		0	0	0	0	
36	MF	Argentina	Joaquín Indacoechea	0	0	0	0	0	0	—		0	0	0	0	
39	MF	Argentina	Yoel Juárez	0	0	0	0	0	0	—		0	0	0	0	
87	DM	Argentina	Ezequiel Videla	0	0	0	0	0	0	—		0	0	0	0	
–	FW	Argentina	Jonatan Benedetti	0	0	0	0	0	0	—		0	0	0	0	
–	CB	Argentina	Manuel Capasso	0	0	0	0	0	0	—		0	0	0	0	
–	CF	Argentina	Lucas Di Yorio	0	0	0	0	0	0	—		0	0	0	0	
–	CM	Argentina	Fernando Godoy	0	0	0	0	0	0	—		0	0	0	0	
–	FW	Argentina	Francisco Leonardo	0	0	0	0	0	0	—		0	0	0	0	
Own goals				—	0	—	0	—	0	—		—	0	—	—	—
Players who left during the season
18	AM	Argentina	Javier Iritier	0	0	0	0	0	0	—		0	0	0	0	
–	CF	Argentina	Denis Stracqualursi	0	0	0	0	0	0	—		0	0	0	0	

Statistics accurate as of 2 September 2019.

=== Goalscorers ===
Rank	Pos	No.	Nat	Name	League	Cup	League Cup	Continental	Total	Ref
1	AM	7	Argentina	Nazareno Solís	1	0	0	–	1	
1	AM	9	Argentina	Alan Ruiz	1	0	0	–	1	
Own goals					1	0	0	–	1	
Totals					3	0	0	–	3	—
