= List of people with given name Wilson =

Wilson is a male first name. Notable people with the name include:

== People ==
=== A ===
- Wilson Ruffin Abbott (c. 1801–1876), American-born Canadian businessman and landowner
- Wilson Akakpo (born 1992), Ghanaian-born Togolese footballer
- Wilson Asinobi Ake (born 1955), Nigerian former politician
- Wilson Alcorro (born 1974), Colombian former boxer
- Wilson Alegre (born 1984), Angolan former footballer
- Wilson Altamirano (born 1998), Argentine footballer
- Wilson Álvarez (born 1970), Venezuelan former Major League Baseball pitcher
- Wilson Alvarez (American football) (born 1957), Bolivian former National Football League player
- Wilson Francisco Alves (1927–1998), aka Wilson (footballer, born 1927), Brazilian manager and defender
- Wilson Antônio (born 1982), Brazilian footballer
- Wilson Aparecido Xavier Júnior (born 1984), Brazilian footballer
- Wilson Arbogast (1851–?), American co-founder of meat packing plant Arbogast & Bastian
- Wilson Armas (born 1958), Ecuadorian football manager and former player
- Wilson Armistead (1819–1868), English businessman, abolitionist, and writer
- Wilson Ávila (born 1960), Bolivian footballer

=== B ===
- Wilson Baker (1900–2002), English organic chemist
- Wilson K. Barnes (1907–1997), American judge
- Wilson Barrett (1846–1904), English actor, theater manager, and playwright
- Wilson Bell (1897–1947), American politician
- Wilson Benge (1875–1955), English actor
- Wilson Bentley (1865–1931), American photographer and meteorologist
- Wilson Betemit (born 1981), Dominican former Major League Baseball player
- Wilson Bethel (born 1984), American actor and producer
- Wilson Bigaud (1931–2010), Haitian painter
- Wilson Bii (born 1986), Kenyan visually-impaired runner
- Wilson Bikram Rai, Nepalese comedian, actor, singer, dancer, and film producer
- Wilson S. Bissell (1847–1903), American politician
- Wilson Bombarda (born 1930), Brazilian former basketball player
- Wilson Borja (1952–2024), Colombian trade unionist and politician
- Wilson G. Bradshaw (born 1949), American university president
- Wilson Braga (1931–2020), Brazilian politician, lawyer, and businessman
- Wilson Brown (disambiguation)
- Wilson Bugembe (born 1984), Ugandan pastor and gospel singer
- Wilson Bryant Burtt (1875–1957), American Army brigadier general during World War I
- Wilson Busienei (born 1981), Ugandan long-distance runner
- Wilson Buzzone (1938–2023), Brazilian footballer

=== C ===
- Wilson Cain (1887–1969), Canadian politician
- Wilson Caldwell (1841–1898), American university officer
- Wilson Callan (1939–2022), Canadian politician
- Wilson Cañizales (born 1964), Colombian retired sprinter
- Wilson Carlile (1847–1942), English priest and Christian evangelist
- Wilson Carvalho (born 1993), Portuguese former footballer
- Wilson Miles Cary (1733–1817), American politician
- Wilson Casey (born 1954), American columnist, book author, political humorist, entertainer, speaker, and record holder
- Wilson Cepeda (born 1980), Colombian former road racing cyclist
- Wilson Chandler (born 1987), American former National Basketball Association player
- Wilson Charlton (1907–1953), British Royal Air Force officer during the Second World War
- Wilson Chebet (born 1985), Kenyan long-distance runner
- Wilson Chimeli (born 1989), Paraguayan footballer
- Wilson Chinn, African-American 19th-century escaped slave
- Wilson Choperena (1923–2011), Colombian composer and singer
- Wilson Chouest (born 1951), American convicted murderer
- Wilson Hart Clark (1820–1887), American lawyer and politician
- Wilson Cleveland (born 1974), American actor, producer, and writer
- Wilson Seymour Conger (1804–1864), Canadian merchant and politician
- Wilson Clyde (1934–2019), Northern Irish politician
- Wilson Coleman (1873–1940), British actor
- Wilson Collins (1889–1941), American Major League Baseball player
- Wilson Collison (1893–1941), American writer and playwright
- Wilson Contreras (born 1967), Chilean former footballer
- Wilson Cooke (1819–1887), American politician, minister, and businessman
- Wilson A. Crockett, Canadian politician
- Wilson Cruz (born 1973), American actor
- Wilson Cuero (born 1992), Colombian footballer

=== D ===
- Wilson da Silva, Brazilian-born Australian feature writer, science journalist, editor, and documentary filmmaker
- Wilson Deodato da Silva, birth name of Tatico (born 1981), Brazilian footballer
- Wilson das Neves (1936–2017), Brazilian percussionist and singer
- Wilson de Freitas (1910–1945), Brazilian rower
- Wilson Delgado (born 1972), Dominican former Major League Baseball player
- Wilson dos Santos (?–1991), Angolan politician and murder victim
- Wilson dos Santos (athlete) (born 1958), Brazilian sprinter
- Wilson Roberto dos Santos, aka Wilson (footballer, born 1975), Brazilian centre-back
- Wilson Duff (1925–1976), Canadian archaeologist, cultural anthropologist, and museum curator

=== E ===
- Wilson V. Eagleson (1920–2006), American Army Air Force officer and fighter pilot
- Wilson Earnshaw (1867–1941), English cricketer
- Wilson C. Edsell (1814–1900), American politician
- Wilson Eduardo (born 1990), Portuguese footballer
- Wilson Homer Elkins (1908–1994), American educator and university administrator
- Wilson Elso Goñi (1938–2009), Uruguayan politician
- Wilson C. Ely (1873–1959), American co-owner of architectural firm John H. & Wilson C. Ely
- Wilson Escalante (born 1977), Bolivian football manager and former player
- Wilson Eyre (1858–1944), American architect, teacher, and writer

=== F ===
- Wilson Fairweather (1924–1989), Scottish footballer
- Wilson Fallin (born c. 1942), American historian and professor emeritus
- Wilson Faumuina (1954–1986), American NFL player
- Wilson Ferreira Aldunate (1919–1988), Uruguayan politician
- Wilson L. Fewster (c. 1926–2014), American college lacrosse player and college multi-sport coach
- Wilson Filho (born 1989), Brazilian politician
- Wilson Fittipaldi Júnior (1943–2024), Brazilian racing driver
- Wilson Fitts (1915–2005), American NBL player
- Wilson Flagg (1938–2001), United States Navy rear admiral killed during 9/11
- Wilson C. Flake (1906–1977), American diplomat
- Wilson G. Flint (?–1867), American politician
- Wilson Lee Flores, Filipino writer, entrepreneur, educator, poet, philanthropist, and political-economic analyst
- Wilson Folleco (born 1989), Ecuadorian footballer
- Wilson Follett (1887–1963), American writer
- Wilson Fonseca (1912–2002), Brazilian maestro, composer, conductor, and writer
- Wilson P. Foss Jr. (c. 1891–1957), American art collector, art dealer, and businessman
- Wilson Fox (1831–1887), English physician
- Wilson Frost (1925–2018), American lawyer and politician

=== G ===
- Wilson Gale-Braddyll (1756–1818), British Member of Parliament
- Wilson Gaspar (born 1990), Portuguese-born Angolan footballer
- Wilson S. Geisler, American vision scientist and neuroscientist
- Wilson D. Gillette (1880–1951), American politician
- Wilson Godoy (born 1987), Guatemalan footballer
- Wilson Gómez (born 1995), Argentine footballer
- Wilson Goode (born 1938), American politician and former mayor
- Wilson Gottardo (born 1963), Brazilian former footballer and current coach
- Wilson Gouveia (born 1978), Brazilian retired mixed martial artist
- Wilson Gray (1813–1875), Irish-born barrister, Australian politician, and New Zealand district judge
- Wilson Greatbatch (1919–2011), American engineer and inventor
- Wilson Grosset (born 1981), French association footballer
- Wilson Gunaratne (born 1949), Sri Lankan comedian and actor
- Wilson Gutiérrez (born 1971), Colombian football manager and former player

=== H ===
- Wilson H. Hamilton (1877–1949), American Supreme Court justice
- Wilson Hall (rugby league) (1900–?), New Zealand rugby league footballer
- Wilson Haro (born 1998), Ecuadorian road cyclist
- Wilson Harris (1921–2018), Guyanese writer
- Wilson Harris (journalist) (1883–1955), English editor and non-fiction writer
- Wilson Harris (soccer) (born 1999), American soccer player
- Wilson Godfrey Harvey (1866–1932), American politician and businessman
- Wilson A. Head (1914–1993), American-Canadian sociologist, professor, and community planner
- Wilson Heredia (born 1972), Dominican former Major League Baseball pitcher
- Wilson Jermaine Heredia (born 1971), American actor
- Wilson R. Herron (1830–1895), American postmaster and county supervisor
- Wilson Hicks (1896/1897–1970), American journalist and author
- Wilson Hicks (politician), African-American 19th-century politician
- Wilson S. Hill (1863–1921), American lawyer and politician
- Wilson Hirschfeld (1916–1974), American journalist and managing editor
- Wilson W. Hoover (c. 1849–1926), American jurist and attorney
- Wilson Humphries (1928–1992), Scottish footballer and manager
- Wilson Hungerford (1884–1969), Northern Irish politician
- Wilson Price Hunt (1783–1842), American pioneer and explorer

=== I ===
- Wilson Inia (1908–1983), Fijian educator and politician
- Wilson Irvine (1869–1936), American Impressionist landscape painter
- Wilson Isidor (born 2000), French-born English footballer

=== J ===
- Wilson Jameson (1885–1962), Scottish medical doctor
- Wilson Roosevelt Jerman (1929–2020), American butler who served in the White House
- Wilson Jones (disambiguation)

=== K ===
- Wilson Chisala Kalumba (c. 1964–2018), Zambian politician
- Wilson Kamavuaka (born 1990), German-born Republic of the Congo \footballer
- Wilson Kaoma, Zambian boxer
- Wilson Karunaratne (1942–2022), Sri Lankan film actor and stunt director
- Wilson Katiyo (1947–2003), Zimbabwean novelist
- Wilson Kebenei (born 1980), Kenyan long-distance runner
- Wilson S. Kennon (1826–1895), American politician
- Wilson Bryan Key (1925–2008), American author
- Wilson Khumbula (born 1937), Zimbabwean politician and businessman
- Wilson T. King, English multi-instrumentalist, songwriter, and producer
- Wilson Kipketer (born 1972), Danish former middle-distance runner
- Wilson Boit Kipketer (born 1973), Kenyan middle- and long-distance runner
- Wilson Kiprop (born 1987), Kenyan long-distance runner
- Wilson Kiprugut (1938–2022), Kenyan sprinter and middle-distance runner
- Wilson Kiprotich (disambiguation)
- Wilson Kirwa (1974), Finnish middle-distance runner, municipal politician, writer, and entrepreneur
- Wilson Kitara (born 1971), Ugandan Anglican bishop
- Wilson Kneeshaw (born 1994), English footballer
- Wilson Ko (1960–2014/2015), American surgeon and professor
- Wilson Kokalari (1936–2014), Albanian-American aerospace engineer
- Wilson Ugak Kumbong (born 1962), Malaysian politician

=== L ===
- Wilson Lalín (born 1985), Guatemalan footballer
- Wilson Lauder (born 1948), Scottish former international rugby union player, and current power plant engineer
- Wilson Law (1806–1876), Irish-American Mormon journalist
- Wilson Leite Passos (1926–2016), Brazilian politician
- Wilson Lewis (1873–after 1898), English professional footballer
- Wilson Li (born 1975), Hong Kong politician
- Wilson Lima (born 1976), Brazilian politician and journalist
- Wilson Litole (?–2016), Kenyan politician
- Wilson Livingood (born 1936), American Secret Service veteran
- Wilson Lloyd (1835–1908), English iron founder and politician
- Wilson Lloyd Bevan (1866–1935), American historian
- Wilson Lo (born 1991), Canadian politician
- Wilson R. Lourenço, French-Brazilian arachnologist
- Wilson Lowry (1762–1824), English engraver
- Wilson Loyanae Erupe, birth name of Oh Joo-han (born 1988), Kenyan-born Korean long-distance runner
- Wilson Lumpkin (1783–1870), American planter, attorney, and politician

=== M ===
- Wilson MacDonald (1880–1967), Canadian poet
- Wilson Macías (born 1965), Ecuadorian footballer
- Wilson Manafá (born 1994), Portuguese professional footballer
- Wilson Mannon (1928–1992), American murder victim
- Wilson Mano (born 1964), Brazilian former footballer
- Wilson "Saoko" Manyoma (?–2025), Colombian past member of salsa group Fruko y sus Tesos
- Wilson Masilingi (born 1956), Tanzanian politician and diplomat
- Wilson Martins (disambiguation)
- Wilson Mazarello (born 1946), Indian singer, writer, playwright, and politician
- Wilson Mbadi (born 1962), Ugandan military officer
- Wilson Mbomio (born 2002), English actor
- Wilson McCandless (1810–1882), American district judge
- Wilson McCarthy (1884–1956), American attorney, jurist, and railroad executive
- Wilson McCoy (1902–1961), American illustrator and painter
- Wilson McEwan (1830–1885), Scottish-born Australian cricketer
- Wilson McGhee (1892–1948), Scottish footballer
- Wilson McLean (born 1937), Scottish illustrator and artist
- Wilson Carey McWilliams (1933–2005), American political scientist
- Wilson Méndez (born 1982), Paraguayan former footballer
- Wilson Meneses (born 1981), Colombian cyclist
- Wilson Messer (1876–1958), American farmer, businessman, and politician
- Wilson Miao (born 1987), Canadian politician
- Wilson Milam, American theatre director
- Wilson Mills (1882–1955), Canadian farmer and politician
- Wilson Plumer Mills (1883–1959), American missionary and humanitarian
- Wilson Minuci (born 1969), Brazilian former professional basketball player
- Wilson D. Miscamble (born 1953), Australian-born American Catholic priest and professor of history
- Wilson Mizner (1876–1933), American playwright, raconteur, and entrepreneur
- Wilson Abraham Moncayo Jalil (1944–2012), Ecuadorian Roman Catholic bishop
- Wilson Moreira (1936–2018), Brazilian sambista
- Wilson Morelo (born 1987), Colombian footballer
- Wilson Morrison (c. 1851–1882), New Zealand cricketer
- Wilson Moses (1881–1953), Australian politician
- Wilson Jeremiah Moses (1942–2024), African-American historian and professor
- Wilson Mudau (born 1961), South African politician
- Wilson Mukama (born 1949), Tanzanian politician
- Wilson Muñoz (born 1975), Costa Rican former professional footballer
- Wilson Muruli Mukasa (born 1952), Ugandan politician
- Wilson Mutebi (born 1937), Ugandan Anglican bishop
- Wilson Mutekede, Zimbabwean football manager
- Wilson Myers (1906–1992), American jazz double-bassist, baritone- and bass saxophonist, vocalist, bandleader, and arranger

=== N ===
- Wilson Ndolo Ayah (1932–2016), Kenyan politician
- Wilson Nesbitt (1781–1861), American politician
- Wilson Ngcobo, South African politician
- Wilson Cary Nicholas (1761–1820), American politician and governor
- Wilson Noble (1854–1917), English barrister and politician
- [[]] (born 1969), Angolan former footballer
- Wilson Nqose (born c. 1943), South African former army general
- Wilson Nyabong Ijang (born 1959), Malaysian politician

=== O ===
- Wilson Odobert (born 2004), French professional footballer
- Wilson Omwoyo (born 1965), Kenyan retired long-distance runner
- Wilson Onsare (born 1976), Kenyan former long-distance runner
- Wilson Or (born 1973), Hong Kong politician
- Wilson Oruma (born 1976), Nigerian former footballer
- Wilson Gonzalez Ochsenknecht (born 1990), German actor

=== P ===
- Wilson Palacios (born 1984), Honduran former footballer
- Wilson Parasiuk (born 1943), Canadian businessman and former politician
- Wilson Parker (1909–?), English professional footballer
- Wilson Peña (born 1998), Colombian cyclist
- Wilson Pérez (born 1967), Colombian retired footballer
- Wilson Raj Perumal (born 1965), Singaporean match-fixer and bookmaker
- Wilson Piazza (born 1943), Brazilian former footballer
- Wilson Pickett (1941–2006), American singer and songwriter
- Wilson Pineda (born 1993), Guatemalan professional footballer
- Wilson Pinheiro (?–1980), Brazilian socialist who was assassinated
- Wilson Pires de Carvalho, full name of Liliu (futsal player) (born 1979), Brazilian-born Belgian futsal player
- Wilson Pittoni (born 1985), Paraguayan professional footballer
- Wilson Popenoe (1892–1975), American botanist and agronomist
- Wilson Potter (?–1936), American architect

=== Q ===
- Wilson Quiñonez (born 1988), Paraguayan footballer

=== R ===
- Wilson Ramos (born 1987), Venezuelan former Major League Baseball player
- Wilson Rathborne (1748–1831), British Royal Navy captain
- Wilson Rawls (1913–1984), American writer of children's novels
- Wilson Redus (1905–1979), American Negro league baseball player
- Wilson Reilly (1811–1885), American politician
- Wilson Reis (born 1985), Brazilian mixed martial artist
- Wilson Gaines Richardson (1825–1886), American classicist, minister, and American Civil War veteran
- Wilson Riles (1917–1999), American educator and politician
- Wilson Roberts (1770–1853), English politician
- Wilson Enrique Rodríguez (born 1994), Colombian cyclist
- Wilson Rodrigues Fonseca, aka Wilson (footballer, born 1985), Brazilian forward
- Wilson Rodrigues de Moura Júnior, aka Wilson (footballer, born 1984), Brazilian goalkeeper

=== S ===
- Wilson Sabiya (1938–2004), Nigerian politician
- Wilson Sanches Leal (born 1985), Portuguese footballer
- Wilson Sánchez (born 1978), Colombian-Salvadoran retired footballer
- Wilson Santamaría (born 1981), Bolivian lawyer, politician, and sociologist
- Wilson Santiago (born 1957), Brazilian politician
- Wilson G. Sarig (1874–1936), American politician and educator
- Wilson Savoy (born 1982), American accordionist, keyboard player, fiddler, and singer
- Wilson Sawyer (1917–1979), American composer, arranger, and musician
- Wilson Scheidemantel (born 1949), Brazilian sports shooter
- Wilson Seneme (born 1970), Brazilian football referee
- Wilson Severino (born 1980), Argentine former footballer
- Wilson Shannon (1802–1877), American attorney and politician
- Wilson Shieh (born 1970), Hong Kong artist
- Wilson Allen Shoffner (1938–2014), American Army lieutenant general
- Wilson Sibbett (1948–2024), Northern Irish physicist and professor
- Wilson Siewari (born 1973), Nigerian freestyle wrestler
- Wilson Simonal (1938–2000), Brazilian singer
- Wilson Sitshebo (1952–2008), Zimbabwean Anglican bishop
- Wilson Small (1810–1886), American tradesman, businessman, politician, and public servant
- Wilson Smith (disambiguation)
- Wilson Somers, American jazz- and vocal music instructor, composer, and performer
- Wilson W. Sorensen (1916–2009), American college president
- Wilson Sossion (born 1969), Kenyan legislator and teacher
- Wilson Soto, Puerto Rican politician and former mayor
- Wilson Reiff Stearly (1869–1941), American Episcopal bishop
- Wilson Stone
- Wilson Surubim (born 1980), Brazilian footballer
- Wilson Sutherland (1935–2019), British mathematician
- Wilson Cary Swann (1806–1876), American physician, philanthropist, and social reformer

=== T ===
- Wilson Edgar Terry (1874–1968), American military officer
- Wilson Tiago (born 1983), Brazilian former footballer
- Wilson Tucker (disambiguation)
- Wilson Tuckey (born 1935), Australian politician

=== V ===
- Wilson Valdez (born 1978), Dominican former MLB player
- Wilson Vance (1845–1911), American Civil War Union Army soldier, author, journalist, and editor

=== W ===
- Wilson Waigwa (born 1949), Kenyan long- and middle-distance runner
- Wilson Dallam Wallis (1886–1970), American anthropologist
- Wilson Wang (1918–1998), Hong Kong businessman and school proprietor and supervisor
- Wilson Warlick (1892–1978), American district judge
- Wilson Washington (born 1955), American former NBA player and former college assistant coach
- Wilson D. Watson (1922–1994), American Marine Corps private during World War II
- Wilson Waweru (born 2000), Irish footballer
- Wilson Weddington (1847–1923), American postmaster, businessman, and landowner
- Wilson Whineray (1935–2012), New Zealand business executive and rugby union player
- Wilson Whitley (1955–1992), American National Football League player
- Wilson Dobie Wilson (1803–1838), Scottish author, editor, and traveler
- Wilson Wood (disambiguation)
- Wilson Worsdell (1850–1920), English locomotive engineer
- Wilson W. Wyatt (1905–1996), American politician

=== Y ===
- Wilson Yip (born 1964), Hong Kong filmmaker and actor

=== Z ===
- Wilson Zhang (born 1979), Chinese-born Canadian table tennis player

== Fictional characters ==
- Wilson Edwards, fictional Swiss biologist
- Wilson Fisk, in the US comic books Marvel Comics
- Wilson Loewen, in the US prison drama TV series Oz, played by Tom Atkins
- Wilson P. Higgsbury, in the survival video game Don't Starve
- Wilson the Volleyball, in the 2000 US survival drama film Cast Away
- Wilson White, in the US comedy-drama TV series Studio 60 on the Sunset Strip, played by Edward Asner
- Wilson Wilson Jr., in the US sitcom TV series Home Improvement, played by Earl Hindman

== See also ==
- List of people with surname Wilson
- Wilson (name)
- Wilson (disambiguation)
