= Facundo Tobares =

Argentine professional footballer

Personal information
- Date of birth: 23 March 2000 (age 26)
- Place of birth: Puerto Santa Cruz, Argentina
- Position: Striker

Team information
- Current team: Aldosivi

Youth career
- CA Santa Cruz
- 2014–2019: Aldosivi

Senior career*
Years	Team	Apps	(Gls)
2019–	Aldosivi	4	(0)
- * Club domestic league appearances and goals as of 14:56, 20 March 2022 (UTC)

Facundo Tobares (born 23 March 2000) is an Argentine professional footballer who plays as a striker for Aldosivi.

== Career ==
Tobares' career got underway with Aldosivi, after he had signed in December 2014 from local club CA Santa Cruz. Gustavo Álvarez promoted the striker into Aldosivi's first-team in September 2019, ahead of a Primera División fixture with Unión Santa Fe. His professional debut subsequently arrived in the aforementioned match on 27 September, as Tobares replaced Facundo Bertoglio after thirty-five minutes of a home defeat.

== Career statistics ==
As of 28 September 2019.

Appearances and goals by club, season and competition
Club	Season	League			Cup		League Cup		Continental		Other		Total	
Club	Season	Division	Apps	Goals	Apps	Goals	Apps	Goals	Apps	Goals	Apps	Goals	Apps	Goals
Aldosivi	2019–20	Primera División	1	0	0	0	0	0	—		0	0	1	0
Career total			1	0	0	0	0	0	—		0	0	1	0
