= Lucas Di Yorio =

Argentine professional footballer

Personal information
- Full name: Lucas Gabriel Di Yorio
- Date of birth: 22 November 1996 (age 29)
- Place of birth: Mar del Plata, Argentina
- Height: 1.92 m (6 ft 4 in)
- Position: Forward

Team information
- Current team: Santos Laguna
- Number: 9

Youth career
- 2000–2010: Talleres
- 2010–2015: Kimberley
- 2015–2016: Aldosivi

Senior career*
Years	Team	Apps	(Gls)
2016–2021	Aldosivi	11	(0)
2019	→ LDU Portoviejo (loan)	34	(14)
2021	Cerro Largo	13	(9)
2022–2023	Pachuca	15	(2)
2022	→ Everton (loan)	13	(7)
2022–2023	→ León (loan)	35	(11)
2024–2025	Athletico Paranaense	16	(7)
2025	→ Universidad de Chile (loan)	27	(12)
2026–	Santos Laguna	15	(7)
- * Club domestic league appearances and goals as of 23 December 2025

Lucas Gabriel Di Yorio (born 22 November 1996) is an Argentine professional footballer who plays as a forward for Liga MX club Santos Laguna.

== Career ==
Di Yorio's youth career started at the age of four when he joined the ranks at Talleres, he remained with them until 2010 when he moved to join Kimberley's youth team. A further five years later he departed to join Argentine Primera División club Aldosivi's reserves. He was promoted into Aldosivi's first-team a year later in 2016 and made his debut on 10 April against Racing Club, he played thirty-four minutes and picked up a card in the process. One more league appearance and one in the Copa Argentina followed for Di Yorio in 2016. He didn't make a first-team appearance in 2016–17 as Aldosivi were relegated to the second tier.

On 6 March 2019, Di Yorio signed for Ecuadorian Serie B side L.D.U. Portoviejo on loan. He scored his first senior goal with the club, converting a penalty in a 1–0 win over Independiente Juniors on 6 April. Di Yorio netted a hat-trick over Clan Juvenil on 17 August.

After playing for Universidad de Chile on loan from Brazilian club Athletico Paranaense during 2025, Di Yorio moved to Mexico and signed with Santos Laguna.

== Career statistics ==
As of 23 October 2019

Club statistics
Club	Season	League			National Cup		League Cup		Continental		Other		Total	
Club	Season	Division	Apps	Goals	Apps	Goals	Apps	Goals	Apps	Goals	Apps	Goals	Apps	Goals
Aldosivi	2016	Primera División	2	0	1	0	—		—		0	0	3	0
Aldosivi	2016–17	Primera División	0	0	0	0	—		—		0	0	0	0
Aldosivi	2017–18	Primera B Nacional	2	0	0	0	—		—		0	0	2	0
Aldosivi	2018–19	Primera División	0	0	0	0	0	0	—		0	0	0	0
Aldosivi	2019–20	Primera División	0	0	0	0	0	0	—		0	0	0	0
Aldosivi	Total		4	0	1	0	0	0	—		0	0	5	0
L.D.U. Portoviejo (loan)	2019	Serie B	28	11	2	1	—		—		0	0	30	12
Career total			32	11	2	1	1	0	—		0	0	35	12

== Honours ==
Aldosivi

- Primera B Nacional: 2017–18

León

- CONCACAF Champions League: 2023

Athletico-PR

- Campeonato Paranaense: 2024
