= Leandro Maciel =

Argentine footballer

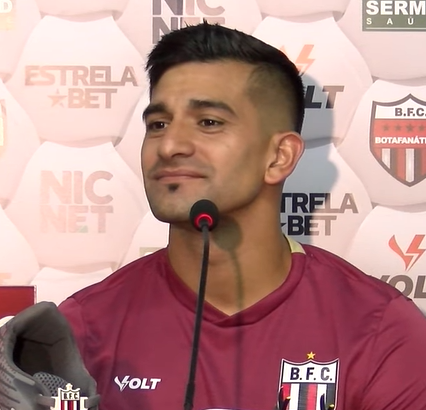
- Maciel in 2024

Personal information
- Full name: Leandro Isaac Maciel
- Date of birth: 29 December 1995 (age 30)
- Place of birth: Rosario, Argentina
- Height: 1.77 m (5 ft 9 1/2 in)
- Position: Midfielder

Team information
- Current team: Botafogo-SP

Youth career
- Lanús

Senior career*
| Years | Team | Apps | (Gls) |
| 2016–2020 | Lanús | 31 | (1) |
| 2019–2020 | → Aldosivi (loan) | 16 | (0) |
| 2020–2022 | Aldosivi | 71 | (5) |
| 2023 | Central Córdoba | 36 | (4) |
| 2024– | Botafogo-SP | 93 | (11) |
- * Club domestic league appearances and goals as of 18 November 2026

Leandro Isaac Maciel (born 29 December 1995) is an Argentine professional footballer who plays as a midfielder for Brazilian club Botafogo-SP.

== Career ==
Maciel began his career with Argentine Primera División side Lanús, featuring for the club's U20s at the 2016 U-20 Copa Libertadores where he scored and was sent off as Lanús finished fourth. He made his professional debut for the first-team during their final league fixture of 2016, playing the last twenty-two minutes of a 1–3 defeat to Huracán on 22 May. His first senior goal came in a 1–5 defeat to River Plate on 28 December 2018. In June 2019, Maciel was loaned to Aldosivi for the 2019–20 season. After seventeen appearances in all competitions, Maciel was signed permanently by Aldosivi in August 2020.

== Career statistics ==
As of 27 September 2020.

Club statistics
| Club | Season | League | | | Cup | | League Cup | | Continental | | Other | | Total | |
| Club | Season | Division | Apps | Goals | Apps | Goals | Apps | Goals | Apps | Goals | Apps | Goals | Apps | Goals |
|---|---|---|---|---|---|---|---|---|---|---|---|---|---|---|
| Lanús | 2016 | Primera División | 1 | 0 | 0 | 0 | — | | — | | 0 | 0 | 1 | 0 |
| Lanús | 2016–17 | Primera División | 5 | 0 | 0 | 0 | — | | 1 (Note: Appearance(s) in the Copa Libertadores) | 0 | 0 | 0 | 6 | 0 |
| Lanús | 2017–18 | Primera División | 12 | 0 | 0 | 0 | — | | 2 | 0 | 0 | 0 | 14 | 0 |
| Lanús | 2018–19 | Primera División | 13 | 1 | 1 | 0 | 0 | 0 | 2 (Note: Appearance(s) in the Copa Sudamericana) | 0 | 0 | 0 | 16 | 1 |
| Lanús | 2019–20 | Primera División | 0 | 0 | 0 | 0 | 0 | 0 | 0 | 0 | 0 | 0 | 0 | 0 |
| Lanús | Total | | 31 | 1 | 1 | 0 | 0 | 0 | 5 | 0 | 0 | 0 | 37 | 1 |
| Aldosivi (loan) | 2019–20 | Primera División | 16 | 0 | 1 | 0 | 0 | 0 | — | | 0 | 0 | 17 | 0 |
| Aldosivi | 2020–21 | Primera División | 0 | 0 | 0 | 0 | 0 | 0 | — | | 0 | 0 | 0 | 0 |
| Aldosivi | Total | | 16 | 0 | 1 | 0 | 0 | 0 | — | | 0 | 0 | 17 | 0 |
| Career total | | | 47 | 1 | 2 | 0 | 0 | 0 | 5 | 0 | 0 | 0 | 54 | 1 |

== Honours ==
Lanús

- Argentine Primera División: 2016
