= Nicolás Tauber =

Argentine-Israeli footballer

Nicolás Tauber ניקולאס טאובר
Personal information
- Full name: Nicolás Tauber
- Date of birth: August 20, 1980 (age 46)
- Place of birth: La Plata, Argentina
- Height: 1.82 m (6 ft 0 in)
- Position: Goalkeeper

Team information
- Current team: Villa San Carlos

Senior career*
Years	Team	Apps	(Gls)
1999–2003	Estudiantes de La Plata	73	(0)
2003–2004	Maccabi Netanya	27	(0)
2004–2005	Unión Santa Fe	32	(0)
2005–2008	Almagro	110	(0)
2008–2013	Chacarita Juniors	139	(0)
2013–2016	Nueva Chicago	41	(0)
2016–2017	Tristán Suárez	36	(0)
2017–2018	Deportivo Laferrere	35	(0)
2018–2020	Villa San Carlos	62	(0)
- * Club domestic league appearances and goals

Nicolás Tauber (Hebrew: ניקולאס טאובר; born August 20, 1980) is a retired Argentine-Israeli footballer.

He was born in La Plata, Argentina.

== Playing career ==
During 2003 the former Maccabi Netanya manager, Gili Landau, spotted Nicolás during a scouting tour of Argentina. After discovering that Tauber was in fact Jewish and eligible for Israeli citizenship under the Law of Return, he convinced him to move to Israel and join Maccabi Netanya.

On September 13, 2003, Tauber made his league debut in an away fixture against Bnei Yehuda Tel Aviv. He gave up two goals and Netanya lost their first match of the season. Tauber eventually returned to Argentina.

== See also ==
- List of select Jewish association football (soccer) players
