= America on Wheels =

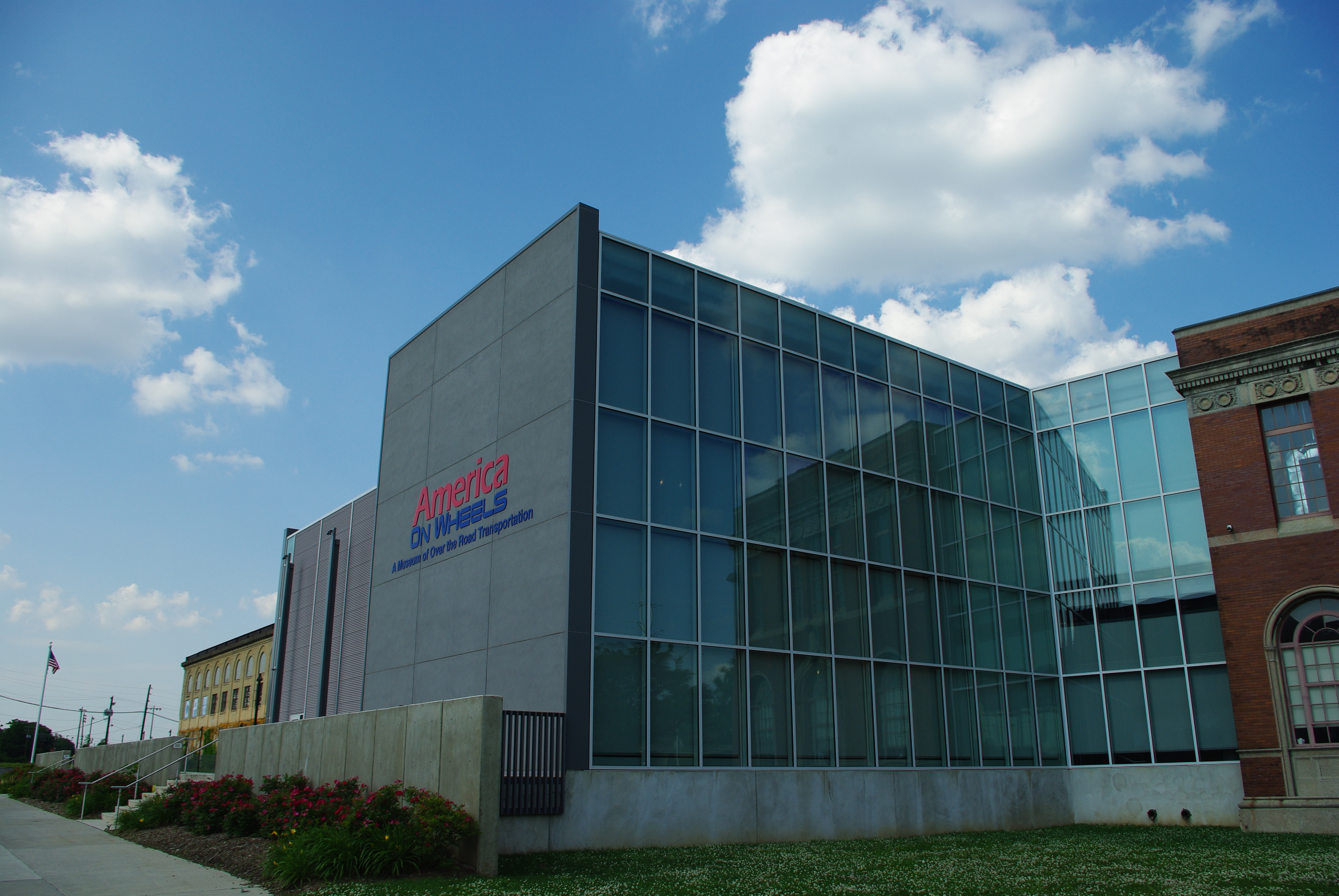
- America on Wheels museum in June 2009
- Established: April 12, 2008; 18 years ago
- Location: 5 N. Front Street; Allentown, Pennsylvania 18102
- Coordinates: 40.615646°N 75.452814°W
- Type: Transportation museum
- Director: Al Ruozzi
- Curator: Monica Ziobro
- Public transit access: LANta bus: 107, 220 (at 2nd and Hamilton streets)
- Website: http://www.americaonwheels.org

America on Wheels is an over-the-road transportation museum in Allentown, Pennsylvania, United States.

The 43,000 square feet (4,000 m^{2}) museum offers over 23,000 square feet (2,100 m^{2}) of exhibit space divided into three main galleries and several smaller exhibits. The museum houses rotating exhibits on the second floor. Also on the second floor is the HubCap Cafe, and a vehicle art gallery featuring the work of artists.

The museum's collection features over 75 bicycles, motorcycles, automobiles and trucks in exhibits telling the story of people and products on the move from the days of the carriage to the vehicles of tomorrow.

The museum also houses the archives of Mack Trucks.

== History ==
=== 20th century ===
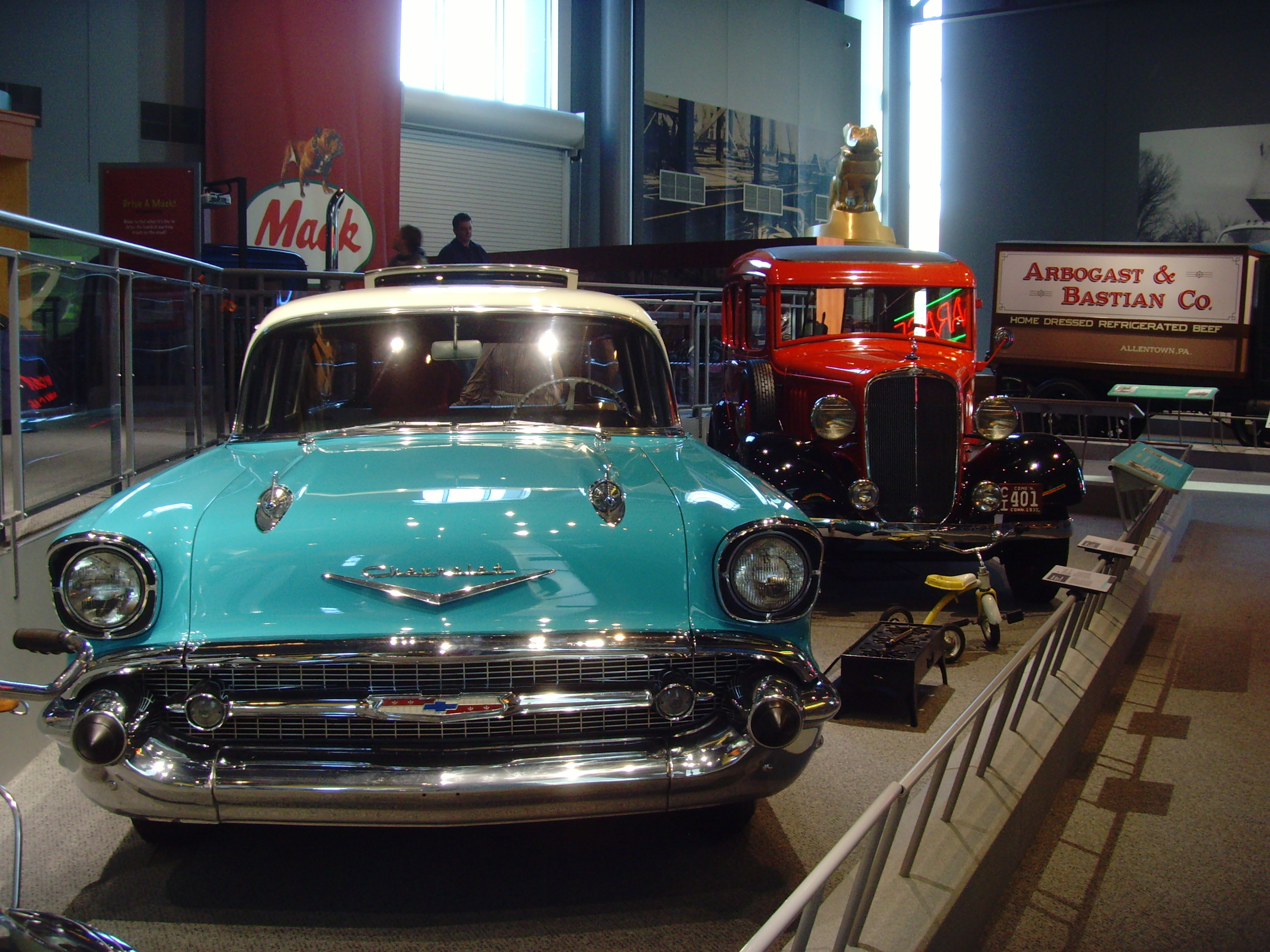
Classic cars on display at the America on Wheels museum in December 2010

In 1989, Allentown city officials had announced plans to revitalize an old industrial area, which included the abandoned Arbogast & Bastian meat packing plant, along the Lehigh River. This redevelopment, which was to be known as "Lehigh Landing," was to include a museum, a brewery, walking trails, a footbridge across the river, and a promenade for festivals.

=== 21st century ===
Development was hindered by fundraising problems, environmental remediation issues, and even a national debate on pork barrel government spending.

After three separate groundbreakings in 2001, 2004 and 2005, the museum, which cost over $17 million to build, was officially opened to the public on April 12, 2008.

== Collection and exhibits ==
=== 1889 Nadig Gas-Powered Carriage ===
A historically important part of the museum's collection is the 1889 Nadig Gas-Powered Car, the first gas-powered vehicle driven in the United States.

Henry Nadig, a Rhineland-born vineyard owner who sold it all to come to America with his family. He became a mechanist and opened up a shop with his sons in Allentown, Henry completed his gas-powered carriage in 1889, two years before Charles E. Duryea's first gas-powered automobile and also had finished his project car in 1889 2 years prior to the Ohio business man John Lambert. Henry tested and drove the vehicle at night, because the carriage scared the horses. He was sighted by local police officers for this incident in Allentown, PA. The vehicle was dedicated by family to keep from rusting and then was slightly restored and placed in the museum for preservation. Family stories will tell that Nadig was approached by Henry Ford in hopes to create a business partnership.

=== General collection ===
The collection of the America on Wheels is minimal as the majority of the vehicles on display are on loan. The West Gallery changes every six months based on a new theme. A number of the vehicles are on loan from the Mack Truck Museum in Allentown, Pennsylvania.

In 2024-2025, many changes took place, including the advent of the Battle of the Car Clubs, whereby several car clubs exhibit a few of their members' best vehicles and guests vote for the best. The newest change is a permanent exhibit called World of Transportation presented by PennLUG (LEGO Users Group). Housed in the Long Haul room on the second floor, the entire room is dedicated to a world made of LEGO bricks, including a train depot, beach, shopping community, and more. It is an interactive exhibit in that there are buttons to initiate train, plane, and helicopter movements by visitors. The exhibit is now open to the public and is expected to be completed by the end of 2025.

Also new in 2025 was the introduction of seminars, free to members and available to non-members for a suggested donation, on topics of interest to the automotive community. Memberships were also offered for the first time.

== See also ==
- List of automobile museums
- List of historic places in Allentown, Pennsylvania
