= Leandro Sapetti =

Argentine footballer

Personal information
- Full name: Leandro Sapetti
- Date of birth: 30 January 1989 (age 37)
- Place of birth: La Plata, Argentina
- Height: 1.76 m (5 ft 9 1/2 in)
- Position: Left-back

Senior career*
Years	Team	Apps	(Gls)
2010–2015	Gimnasia y Esgrima	20	(0)
2013–2014	→ Villa San Carlos (loan)	36	(4)
2014–2015	→ Instituto (loan)	42	(3)
2016–2017	Temperley	7	(1)
2017–2018	Villa Dálmine	22	(0)
2018–2019	Aldosivi	2	(0)
2020	Brown de Adrogué	3	(0)
- * Club domestic league appearances and goals as of 17:51, 24 March 2020 (UTC)

Leandro Sapetti (born 30 January 1989) is an Argentine professional footballer who plays as a left-back.

== Career ==
Sapetti was promoted into the first-team of Gimnasia y Esgrima in 2010. He made eighteen appearances in his first season, including his professional debut on 6 November against Quilmes. Over the course of the following two campaigns, in Primera B Nacional following relegation in 2010–11, Sapetti was selected to appear just twice. In June 2013, Villa San Carlos of Primera B Nacional loaned Sapetti. He netted his first senior career goal in his seventh appearance for the club, during a tie with Patronato on 6 October. In total, Sapetti appeared in thirty-seven games and scored four times as Villa San Carlos were relegated.

He returned to Gimnasia y Esgrima in June 2014, but was immediately loaned to a second tier team again - Instituto. Sapetti remained with Instituto for two seasons, 2014 and 2015, and scored three goals in forty-five matches. After leaving Instituto, he also left Gimnasia y Esgrima permanently in 2016 by joining Argentine Primera División side Temperley. He scored in his second appearance, versus Atlético de Rafaela, but would only make eight appearances in two seasons with the club. July 2017 saw Sapetti make the move to Primera B Nacional's Villa Dálmine, which preceded a change to Aldosivi a year later.

== Career statistics ==
As of 9 September 2018.

Club statistics
Club	Season	League			Cup (Note: Includes the Copa Argentina)		League Cup		Continental (Note: Includes the Copa Sudamericana)		Other		Total	
Club	Season	Division	Apps	Goals	Apps	Goals	Apps	Goals	Apps	Goals	Apps	Goals	Apps	Goals
Gimnasia y Esgrima	2010–11	Primera División	18	0	0	0	—		—		0	0	18	0
Gimnasia y Esgrima	2011–12	Primera B Nacional	2	0	1	0	—		—		0	0	3	0
Gimnasia y Esgrima	2012–13	Primera B Nacional	0	0	0	0	—		—		0	0	0	0
Gimnasia y Esgrima	2013–14	Primera División	0	0	0	0	—		—		0	0	0	0
Gimnasia y Esgrima	2014	Primera División	0	0	0	0	—		0	0	0	0	0	0
Gimnasia y Esgrima	2015	Primera División	0	0	0	0	—		—		0	0	0	0
Gimnasia y Esgrima	Total		20	0	1	0	—		0	0	0	0	21	0
Villa San Carlos (loan)	2013–14	Primera B Nacional	36	4	1	0	—		—		0	0	37	4
Instituto (loan)	2014	Primera B Nacional	13	0	0	0	—		—		0	0	13	0
Instituto (loan)	2015	Primera B Nacional	29	3	1	0	—		—		2 (Note: Two appearances in 2015 Primera B Nacional play-offs)	0	32	3
Instituto (loan)	Total		42	3	1	0	—		—		2	0	45	3
Temperley	2016	Primera División	7	1	1	0	—		—		0	0	8	1
Temperley	2016–17	Primera División	0	0	0	0	—		—		0	0	0	0
Temperley	Total		7	1	1	0	—		—		0	0	8	1
Villa Dálmine	2017–18	Primera B Nacional	22	0	0	0	—		—		1 (Note: One appearance in 2017–18 Primera B Nacional play-offs)	0	23	0
Aldosivi	2018–19	Primera División	0	0	0	0	—		—		0	0	0	0
Career total			127	8	4	0	—		0	0	3	0	134	8
