= Samuel Portillo =

Association football player

Personal information
- Full name: Samuel Portillo Gómez
- Date of birth: 2 May 1994 (age 32)
- Place of birth: Asunción, Paraguay
- Height: 1.75 m (5 ft 9 in)
- Position: Striker

Team information
- Current team: Deportivo Capiatá

Senior career*
Years	Team	Apps	(Gls)
2019–2022	Villa San Carlos	21	(3)
2021	→ Deportivo Riestra (loan)	16	(0)
2022–2026	Deportivo Riestra	16	(1)
2024–2025	→ Almirante Brown (loan)	27	(5)
2026–	Deportivo Capiatá	5	(0)
- * Club domestic league appearances and goals as of 17:02, 4 October 2026 (UTC)

Samuel Portillo Gómez (Note: In this Spanish name, the first or paternal surname is Portillo and the second or maternal family name is Gómez.) (born 2 May 1994) is an Argentine-Paraguayan professional footballer who plays as a striker for Paraguayan club Deportivo Capiatá.

== Career ==
=== Early life ===
Originally from Itaguá in Paraguay, Portillo migrated to Argentina, where he became a painter. His brother contracted him to work in the city of La Plata. In Argentina, Portillo played in the Liga Platense playing for Club Comunidad Rural, where he was twice leading goal scorer and champion - before passing to Villa San Carlos.

=== Villa San Carlos ===
Portillo joined Villa San Carlos for the 2018–19 season. In his first season with Villa San Carlos, he achieved promotion from the Primera C to the Primera B, noting six goals. In 2019, Portillo came off of the bench in the second half to score a double in a home victory against Dock Suck in the league's reduced semi-final. In February 2021, Argentina's TyC Sports reported that Gimnasia La Plata were interested in Portillo. Portillo mentioned the negotiations with Gimnasia LP fell through.

=== Deportivo Riestra ===
On 15 February 2021, Portillo joined Primera B Nacional side Deportivo Riestra on loan until 31 December. His loan runs until January 2022. Portillo arrived at the club with the option to be bought. He was eyed by Estudiantes de Caseros and Almirante Brown before signing with Deportivo Riestra. Portillo was still to find in Riestra during 2022.

== Style of play ==
In 2021, Portillo told Paraguayan newspaper Cronica that as an attacker, he always watches videos of Paraguayan strikers Roque Santa Cruz and Nelson Haedo Valdez.
