= Angel Luna =

Argentine footballer (born 1989)

Personal information
- Full name: Angel Emanuel Luna
- Date of birth: 30 January 1989 (age 37)
- Place of birth: Buenos Aires, Argentina
- Height: 1.69 m (5 ft 7 in)
- Position: Forward

Team information
- Current team: Ituzaingó (on loan from Villa San Carlos)

Youth career
- 2004–2009: San Lorenzo

Senior career*
Years	Team	Apps	(Gls)
2009	San Lorenzo II		
2009–2011	River Plate II		
2011–2012	Flandria	23	(3)
2013–2015	Sud América	66	(11)
2016	Villa Dálmine	9	(1)
2016–2017	Cerro	24	(0)
2017	Liverpool Montevideo	10	(1)
2018–	Villa San Carlos	27	(4)
2018–2019	→ UAI Urquiza (loan)	35	(2)
2020–	→ Ituzaingó (loan)	0	(0)
- * Club domestic league appearances and goals as of 22:17, 24 March 2020 (UTC)

Angel Emanuel Luna (born 30 January 1989) is an Argentinian professional footballer who plays for Club Atlético Ituzaingó, on loan from Club Atlético Villa San Carlos.

== Career ==
=== Youth ===
Luna excelled in the youth divisions of the Argentine Football Association, which were called the 'Argentine Baby Football League'. He was discovered in 2003 by Nestor Ariel Valenzuela, a former player of the Argentine Youth National Team. Luna was playing in the 9th Division at Villa Olimpica at Vélez Sársfield where he was awarded the title of 'Outstanding Forward' in an AFA-Organised tournament.

In 2004, San Lorenzo de Almagro officially signed Luna to the club where he progressed from the 8th to the 4th division within the club's system. Luna contributed to the team's victory in a youth national championship and finished as the top scorer in the 6th Division. Luna was called up to debut with the reserve team of the First Division where he scored a goal against Argentinos Juniors. He was also promoted to the U18 and U20 Pre-National Teams under manager Hugo Tocalli.

=== Professional ===
Luna signed a professional contract with Club Atlético River Plate where he continued to play in the reserve team.

He commenced his career at Club Atlético River Plate in the 4th division, but the club quickly signed him as a professional for three seasons in order to begin playing in their reserve team under Ernesto Corti and under the coaching staff headed by Leonardo Astrada and Hernán Díaz.

in early 2011, Luna progressed and played in the First Division. In addition, he was placed on loan for a period to San Martín de Tucumán who played in the Argentine Second Division (National B). Luna excelled and was highlighted in local media. However, the club had only one position available and decided to bring in a more experienced attacking midfielder.

Luna was compared to former Argentinian strikers Carlos Tevez, Sergio Agüero, and Ezequiel Lavezzi. This comparison led to the nickname "Pocho" after Lavezzi during his time at San Lorenzo de Almagro. Luna is more commonly known as "Bebu".
