= Wilson Wood =

Wilson Wood may refer to:

- Wilson Wood (actor) (1915–2004), American character actor
- Wilson Wood (footballer) (born 1943), Scottish footballer
