= Wilson Gómez =

Argentine footballer

Personal information
- Date of birth: 25 January 1995 (age 31)
- Place of birth: Chabas, Argentina
- Position: Forward

Team information
- Current team: Villa San Carlos

Youth career
- Huracán de Chabás
- 2007–2016: Independiente
- 2016–2017: Villa San Carlos

Senior career*
Years	Team	Apps	(Gls)
2017–	Villa San Carlos	49	(9)
2018	→ Chacarita Juniors (loan)	7	(0)
2019	→ Comunicaciones (loan)	7	(0)

International career
- Argentina U20
- * Club domestic league appearances and goals as of 00:53, 24 March 2020 (UTC)

Wilson Gómez (born 25 January 1995) is an Argentine professional footballer who plays as a forward for Villa San Carlos.

== Club career ==
Gómez played for the academies of Huracán de Chabás and, from 2007, Independiente. In 2016, Gómez completed a move to Primera B Metropolitana's Villa San Carlos. He made ten appearances in his first season, 2016–17, as he also scored the first goals of his career, netting in matches against Excursionistas and UAI Urquiza. After seven goals in twenty-eight matches in 2017–18 as Villa San Carlos were relegated, Gómez was signed on loan by Chacarita Juniors of Primera B Nacional on 12 July 2018. His debut arrived on 1 September versus Platense. He returned to his parent club at the end of the year.

In January 2019, Gómez was loaned to third tier side Comunicaciones.

== International career ==
In 2014, Gómez was called up to represent the Argentina U20s in Spain at the Copa del Atlántico; a tournament they won.

== Career statistics ==
As of 13 May 2019.

Club statistics
Club	Season	League			Cup (Note: Includes the Copa Argentina)		League Cup		Continental		Other		Total	
Club	Season	Division	Apps	Goals	Apps	Goals	Apps	Goals	Apps	Goals	Apps	Goals	Apps	Goals
Villa San Carlos	2016–17	Primera B Metropolitana	10	2	0	0	—		—		0	0	10	2
Villa San Carlos	2017–18	Primera B Metropolitana	28	7	0	0	—		—		0	0	28	7
Villa San Carlos	2018–19	Primera C Metropolitana	0	0	0	0	—		—		0	0	0	0
Villa San Carlos	Total		38	9	0	0	—		—		0	0	38	9
Chacarita Juniors (loan)	2018–19	Primera B Nacional	7	0	0	0	—		—		0	0	7	0
Comunicaciones (loan)	2018–19	Primera B Metropolitana	7	0	0	0	—		—		0	0	7	0
Career total			45	9	0	0	—		—		0	0	45	9
