= Wilson Kiprotich =

Wilson Kiprotich may refer to:

- Wilson Kiprotich Kebenei (born 1980), Kenyan long-distance runner and World Road Running Championships medallist
- Wilson Kipsang Kiprotich (born 1982), Kenyan long-distance road runner and Frankfurt marathon winner
