= Wilson Tucker =

Wilson Tucker may refer to:

- Wilson Tucker (politician) (born 1984), Australian politician
- Wilson Tucker (writer) (1914–2006), American science fiction writer
