= Ramiro Garay =

Argentine footballer

Personal information
- Full name: Ramiro Nicolás Garay
- Date of birth: 6 March 1997 (age 29)
- Place of birth: Castelli, Argentina
- Height: 1.72 m (5 ft 7 1/2 in)
- Position: Midfielder

Youth career
- Deportivo de Castelli

Senior career*
Years	Team	Apps	(Gls)
2016–2020	Aldosivi	4	(0)
2020–2021	Círculo Deportivo	24	(0)
2022	Argentino de Quilmes	13	(1)
- * Club domestic league appearances and goals as of 18:30, 20 March 2025 (UTC)

Ramiro Nicolás Garay (born 6 March 1997) is an Argentine professional footballer who plays as a midfielder.

== Career ==
Garay began his career in the youth ranks of Deportivo de Castelli before joining Argentine Primera División club Aldosivi in 2016. He made his competitive Aldosivi debut on 24 February in a defeat against Estudiantes in the 2016 Argentine Primera División, during the 2016 season he was named in Aldosivi's matchday squad on five occasions but only came off the bench twice. Three appearances followed within the next two campaigns with the last ending in relegation to Primera B Nacional.

== Career statistics ==
As of 24 May 2018.

Club statistics
Club	Season	League			Cup (Note: Includes the Copa Argentina)		League Cup		Continental (Note: Includes the Copa Libertadores and Copa Sudamericana)		Other		Total	
Club	Season	Division	Apps	Goals	Apps	Goals	Apps	Goals	Apps	Goals	Apps	Goals	Apps	Goals
Aldosivi	2016	Argentine Primera División	2	0	0	0	—		—		0	0	2	0
Aldosivi	2016–17	Argentine Primera División	2	0	0	0	—		—		0	0	2	0
Aldosivi	2017–18	Primera B Nacional	0	0	0	0	—		—		0	0	0	0
Career total			4	0	0	0	—		—		0	0	4	0
