= Wilson T. King =

English musician

Wilson T. King is the alias of multi-instrumentalist/songwriter and producer Tim Wilson.

He is the main exponent of the musical style he referred as "future blues" in his Blues Matters interview in May 2010. His debut album, Follow Your First Mind and his second release "Last of the Analogues" have received world-wide critical acclaim in publications as Classic Rock, Guitar Player, Total Guitar, Blues Matters and Blues Rock Magazine. Wilson has sparked debate amongst some in the blues/guitar community with his remarks about the state of modern blues, particularly his criticism of what he refers to as "karaoke blues" artists.

In an interview with Alternative Magazine Online and a BBC Radio interview, Wilson adopted an aggressive stance against "karaoke blues" artists, considering them nothing more than merchants of parody and pastiche.

== Sound and style ==
His main guitar influences stylistically would seem to be Jimi Hendrix, Jeff Beck, Dave Gilmour, Albert King and Duane Allman, while his voice takes a modern laid-back approach, eschewing the typical blues sound.

His compositions vary from simplistic to near avant-garde while maintaining a modern feel with the bass lines tending to be crucial to the minimalist approach.

Lyrically, he has mentioned in frequent interviews, the influence of the poet Charles Bukowski.

== Recordings ==
Follow Your First Mind was released in February 2010 via 19 Miles High and distributed through Interscope Digital Distribution. The album was recorded in Manhattan and in Wilson's home town of Newark-on-Trent, England, and mastered at Abbey Road Studios by Christian Wright. Wilson has stated via his Facebook page that he is in the final stages of recording his second album with an intended release date of mid-2011.

Last of the Analogues http://wilsontking.bandcamp.com was released in October 2012 to universal critical acclaim. The album was recorded in the US and UK and featured Josh Lattanzi of Norah Jones on bass and Dan Whitley brother of the late Blues Great Chris Whitley on Harmonica as guest players. Grammy award winner Brian Lucey famed for his work with Dr John and the Black Keys mastered the record. Reviews included Classic Rock Magazine 8/10, Blues Rock Magazine 8/10 and part of their best of 2012, Guitar Player Magazine March 2013 " A psychedelic tour de force", Blues Matters "Probably Album of the year" as well as on-line reviews such as Music News 5/5, Blues Rock Review 9/10. Metal Discovery 10/10, Rock Guitar Daily "Blade Runner Blues". Wilson was featured artist again in Guitar Player 20edition of 13 March as well as Blues Matters.

In the Guitar Player March 2013 interview Wilson mentioned that this record was more widescreen with more focus on song writing and production.

== Future blues ==
According to an interview with Wilson in the December 2010 issue of Guitar Player Magazine, he is trying to push the blues in new directions by creating records that are void of the typical blues cliches. Lyrically and sonically adventurous, while still deeply embedded within the blues form, he calls the blues the DNA of his recordings.

== Reviews for Follow Your First Mind Released 2010 ==
Classic Rock Magazine ...
"Both Hendrix and Beck would approve of the visionary guitar work of Wilson's debut. There's talent here..."

Guitar Player Magazine ...
"A startlingly deep, raw and stark recording that breathes fresh life into the blues genre ...in keeping with his penchant for pushing the blues envelope in fresh and exciting directions."

Blues Matters Magazine ...
"A stunning guitarist, this album is a real revelation. Vigilante man is epic, this is a man who is obviously in love with the sound of the electric guitar but he is also one of those rare souls who can make music with it ...
There are ghosts all over this album but they are standing and applauding a man who plays blues in the classic manner but with a modern head-i can't help but join them..."

Total Guitar Magazine ...
"While King takes inspiration from the fiery styles of Hendrix and Beck, his aggressive legato style still manages to sound fresh in a seriously crowded genre. Follow Your First Mind remains a standout blues-rock guitar release."

Guitar and Bass Magazine...
"This record is testament to King's desire to make the blues an essential art form once again. It's dark, loud – but never dull.”

Guitar International ...
"Follow Your First Mind, the latest release by Wilson T. King, is an energetic, genuinely original record that seamlessly blends blues and rock influences. If you're a fan of the blues and haven't yet heard Wilson T. King's soulful sounds, you're sincerely missing out.

The many tricks that Wilson T. King pulls out of his bag are seemingly endless; the bluesy howls, the serene legato passages, the Hendrix-like hypnosis he seems to go into, the slide guitars and the dynamic and temporal extremes; this record has a lot to offer a wide range of blues-rock fans.

Although no tour dates are evident as of now, it won't be long before fans demand live performances and even a world tour from Wilson T. King; this kind of magic can't stay bottled up for long, nor should it.

Follow Your First Mind earns and A− for an originality, something that is far too scarce these days in any genre, while at the same time displaying an uncanny ability in the art of tasteful mimicry that pays homage to the greats like Hendrix, SRV, B.B. King, and many others. This record is a must-hear for fans of any genre of guitar music."

== Reviews for Last of the Analogues ==
Classic Rock Magazine ...

8/10 "Have we found the 4th King ? "

Guitar Player Magazine ...

"A Psychedelic Tour De Force"

Rock Guitar Daily

"Blade Runner Blues" Album of the Year LIst 2012"

Music-News 5/5

"He is saying things that I have simply not heard before."

Blues Rock Magazine

Best of 2012, 8/10 "King is a mind blowing guitar player, take this man seriously. The blues genres needs its mavericks to survive, and right about now, Wilson T King might be the best rule breaker out there."

BluesRock Review 9/10

"Every genre has its movers and shakers, and Wilson T. King may be one of the most important revolutionaries of modern blues – The Last of the Analogues proves this."

Blues Matters

"Probably the landmark Album of 2012"

Alternative Magazine on line 8.5/10

Hidden Track

"Like Bukowski, King is breathing new life into an old form "

Metal Discovery 10/10

"here we have Hendrix's attitude reborn in a guitarist who not only transcends established expectations of blues music but is, indubitably, also set to redefine the genre's parameters and what it means to be a genuinely innovative blues player in the twenty-first century"
