= Wilson Filho =

Brazilian politician (born 1989)

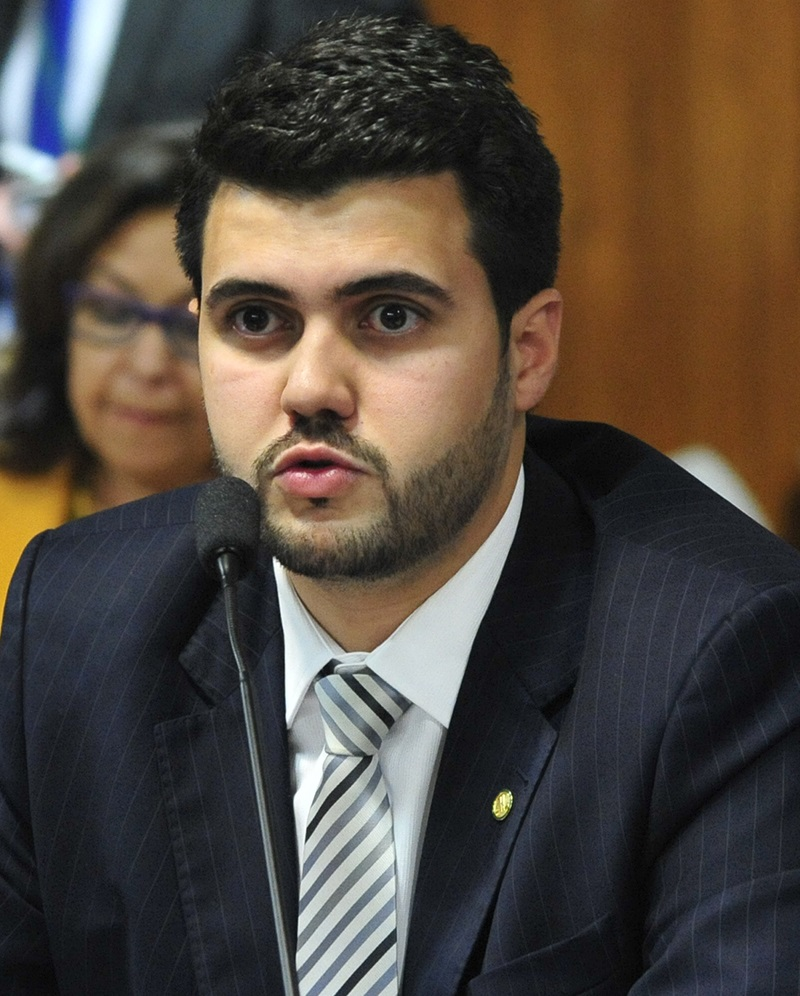

Member of the Chamber of Deputies
- In office 1 February 2011 – 31 January 2019
- Constituency: Paraíba

Personal details
- Born: 10 August 1989 (age 37)
- Party: Republicans (since 2022)
- Parent: Wilson Santiago (father)

José Wilson Santiago Filho (born 10 August 1989) is a Brazilian politician serving as secretary of education of Paraíba since 2024. From 2011 to 2019, he was a member of the Chamber of Deputies. He is the son of Wilson Santiago.
