= Wilson Jones =

Wilson Jones may refer to:

- Wilson Jones (footballer, born 1914) (1914–1986), Welsh professional footballer
- Wilson Jones (footballer, born 1934) (1934–2021), Spanish professional footballer
- Wilson Jones (billiards player) (1922–2003), Indian billiards player
- Wilson W. Jones, California Gold Rush pioneer settler
- Wilson Jones (politician), British minister of parliament for Denbigh Boroughs, 1835–1841

== See also ==
- Anna Wilson-Jones, British actress
