= Wilson Brown =

Wilson Brown may refer to:

- Wilson Brown (admiral) (1882–1957), American World War I and II naval commander
- Wilson Brown (Medal of Honor) (1841–1900), American Civil War sailor
- Wilson Brown (politician) (1804–1855), Missouri lieutenant governor, 1853–1855
- Wilson W. Brown (1837–1916), American soldier and recipient of the Medal of Honor
