= Luciano Pocrnjic =

Argentine footballer

Personal information
- Date of birth: 4 August 1981 (age 45)
- Place of birth: Santa Fe, Argentina
- Height: 1.92 m (6 ft 4 in)
- Position: Goalkeeper

Youth career
- Newell's Old Boys

Senior career*
Years	Team	Apps	(Gls)
2002–2006	Newell's Old Boys	3	(0)
2006	Antofagasta	20	(0)
2007	Huracán TA	15	(0)
2007–2008	Unión	0	(0)
2008–2015	San Martín SJ	152	(0)
2015–2018	Newell's Old Boys	57	(0)
2018–2021	Aldosivi	65	(0)
- * Club domestic league appearances and goals

Luciano Pocrnjic (Croatian: Luciano Pocrnjić; born 4 August 1981) is a retired Argentine professional footballer who played as a goalkeeper for Primera División club Aldosivi.
