= Wilson Santiago =

Brazilian politician (born 1957)

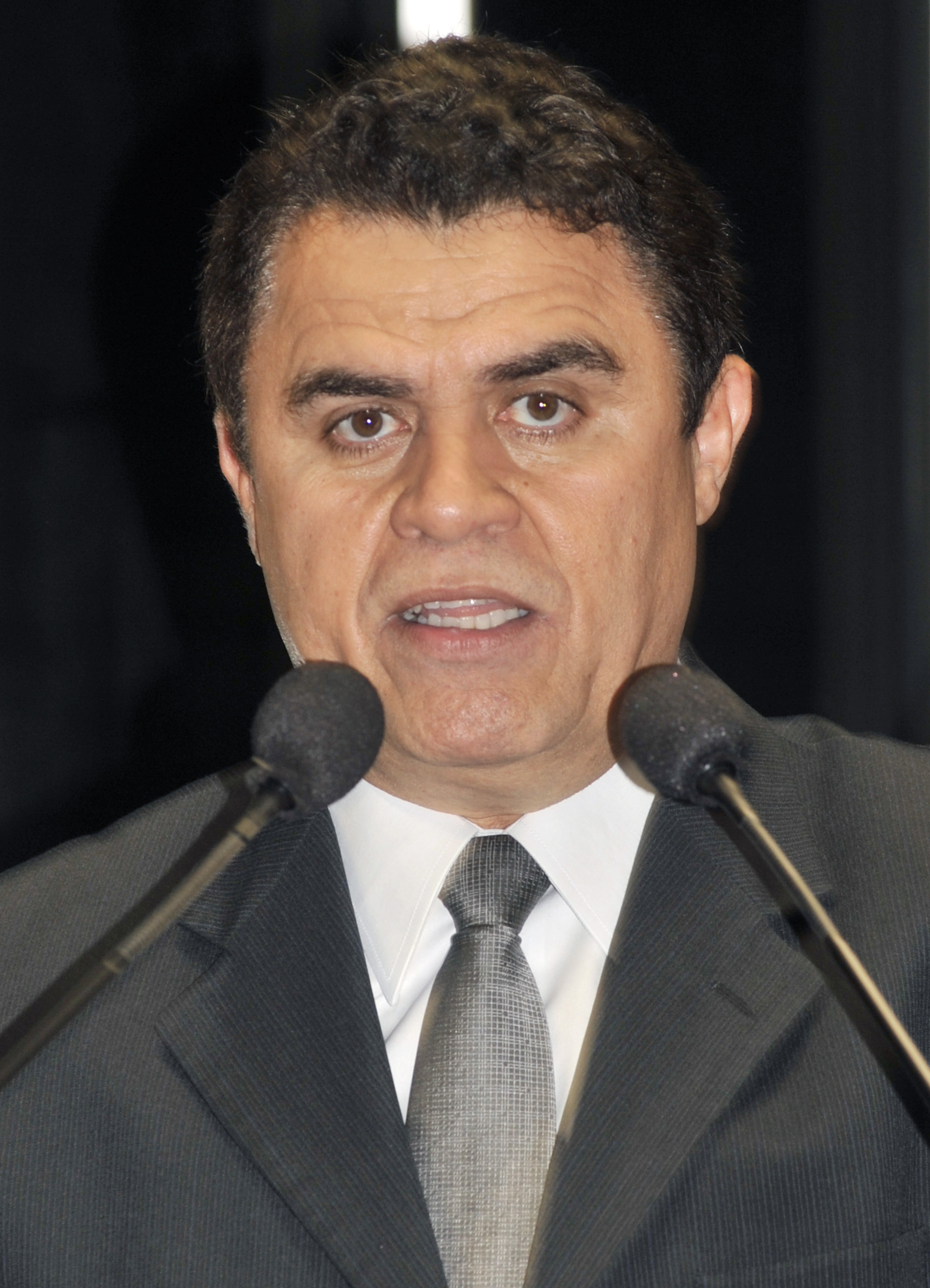
- Santiago in 2011

Member of the Chamber of Deputies
- Incumbent
- Assumed office 1 February 2019
- Constituency: Paraíba
- In office 1 February 2003 – 1 February 2011
- Constituency: Paraíba

Senator for Paraíba
- In office 1 February 2011 – 7 November 2011

Personal details
- Born: José Wilson Santiago; 10 June 1957 (age 69) Uiraúna, Paraíba, Brazil
- Party: Republicanos (since 2022)
- Other political affiliations: PMDB (1980–1990); PDT (1990–1997); PSDB (1997–2001); PMDB (2001–2013); PTB (2013–2022)
- Children: Wilson Filho
- Profession: Lawyer, public servant

José Wilson Santiago (born 10 June 1957) is a Brazilian politician. He has been a member of the Chamber of Deputies since 2019, having previously served from 2003 to 2011. In 2011, he was a member of the Federal Senate. He is the father of Wilson Filho.
