= Javier Iritier =

Argentine footballer

Personal information
- Full name: Javier Eduardo Iritier
- Date of birth: 20 December 1994 (age 31)
- Place of birth: Gregorio de Laferrère, Argentina
- Height: 1.69 m (5 ft 6 1/2 in)
- Position: Left winger

Team information
- Current team: San Telmo

Youth career
- Huracán

Senior career*
| Years | Team | Apps | (Gls) |
| 2016 | Huracán | 5 | (0) |
| 2017 | Estudiantes | 0 | (0) |
| 2017–2018 | Tigre | 9 | (1) |
| 2018–2019 | Aldosivi | 15 | (1) |
| 2019–2020 | Apollon Smyrnis | 8 | (1) |
| 2020–2023 | Aldosivi | 41 | (0) |
| 2023–2025 | Chaco For Ever | 46 | (2) |
| 2025– | San Telmo | 16 | (0) |
- * Club domestic league appearances and goals as of 16:55, 6 May 2026 (UTC)

Javier Eduardo Iritier (born 20 December 1994) is an Argentine professional footballer who plays as a left winger for San Telmo.

== Career ==
Iritier started his senior career in 2016 with Huracán. He made his debut in the Argentine Primera División on 29 October in a 1–1 draw with Rosario Central, prior to making four further appearances throughout 2016–17 before being released in December 2016. In February 2017, Iritier joined fellow Primera División team Estudiantes. His first appearance for the club came during the 2017 Copa Libertadores group stage in a 2–1 defeat to Botafogo on 14 March, which was followed on Matchday 4 with Iritier scoring his first career goal in a 4–1 loss to Atlético Nacional. Iritier left in August 2017 without making a league appearance.

On 16 August 2017, Iritier joined Tigre of the Argentine Primera División. His Tigre debut arrived on 10 September versus Chacarita Juniors. A move to Aldosivi was completed in July 2018. One goal in fifteen games occurred for them. On 16 August 2019, Iritier went abroad to join Super League Greece 2 side Apollon Smyrnis. He made his first appearance against Ergotelis on 29 September, before netting his sole goal for the club on 20 December versus Panachaiki. In September 2020, following eight matches for the Greek outfit as they won promotion, Iritier returned to Aldosivi.

== Career statistics ==
As of 6 September 2020.

Club statistics
| Club | Season | League | | | Cup | | League Cup | | Continental | | Other | | Total | |
| Club | Season | Division | Apps | Goals | Apps | Goals | Apps | Goals | Apps | Goals | Apps | Goals | Apps | Goals |
|---|---|---|---|---|---|---|---|---|---|---|---|---|---|---|
| Huracán | 2016–17 | Primera División | 5 | 0 | 0 | 0 | — | | 0 | 0 | 0 | 0 | 5 | 0 |
| Estudiantes | 2016–17 | Primera División | 0 | 0 | 0 | 0 | — | | 3 (Note: Appearance(s) in the Copa Libertadores) | 1 | 0 | 0 | 3 | 1 |
| Estudiantes | 2017–18 | Primera División | 0 | 0 | 0 | 0 | — | | 1 (Note: Appearance(s) in the Copa Sudamericana) | 0 | 0 | 0 | 1 | 0 |
| Estudiantes | Total | | 0 | 0 | 0 | 0 | — | | 4 | 1 | 0 | 0 | 4 | 1 |
| Tigre | 2017–18 | Primera División | 9 | 1 | 0 | 0 | — | | — | | 0 | 0 | 9 | 1 |
| Aldosivi | 2018–19 | Primera División | 15 | 1 | 0 | 0 | 2 | 1 | — | | 0 | 0 | 17 | 2 |
| Apollon Smyrnis | 2019–20 | Super League 2 | 8 | 1 | 0 | 0 | — | | — | | 0 | 0 | 8 | 1 |
| Aldosivi | 2020–21 | Primera División | 0 | 0 | 0 | 0 | 0 | 0 | — | | 0 | 0 | 0 | 0 |
| Career total | | | 37 | 3 | 0 | 0 | 2 | 1 | 4 | 1 | 0 | 0 | 43 | 5 |
