= Emanuel Iñiguez =

Argentine footballer

Personal information
- Full name: Emanuel Iñiguez
- Date of birth: 16 September 1996 (age 30)
- Place of birth: General Pirán, Argentina
- Height: 1.77 m (5 ft 10 in)
- Position: Right-back

Team information
- Current team: Deportivo Morón

Youth career
- Aldosivi

Senior career*
Years	Team	Apps	(Gls)
2017–2026	Aldosivi	144	(6)
2025	→ Monagas (loan)	22	(0)
2026–	Deportivo Morón	11	(2)
- * Club domestic league appearances and goals as of 17:30, 3 October 2026 (UTC)

Emanuel Iñiguez (born 16 September 1996) is an Argentine professional footballer who plays as a right-back for Deportivo Morón.

== Career ==
Iñiguez started his career with Aldosivi. He was moved into the club's first-team squad during their promotion winning 2017–18 Primera B Nacional campaign, making his professional debut on 2 April 2018 as Aldosivi beat Villa Dálmine 1–0; he had previously been an unused substitute six times in all competitions.

== Career statistics ==
As of 9 October 2018.

Club statistics
Club	Season	League			Cup (Note: Includes the Copa Argentina)		League Cup		Continental		Other		Total	
Club	Season	Division	Apps	Goals	Apps	Goals	Apps	Goals	Apps	Goals	Apps	Goals	Apps	Goals
Aldosivi	2017–18	Primera B Nacional	6	0	0	0	—		—		0	0	6	0
Aldosivi	2018–19	Primera División	7	0	1	0	—		—		0	0	8	0
Career total			13	0	1	0	—		—		0	0	14	0

== Honours ==
Aldosivi

- Primera B Nacional: 2017–18
