= Matías Vega =

Argentine footballer

Personal information
- Full name: Matías Alejandro Vega
- Date of birth: 20 November 1995 (age 30)
- Place of birth: Rosario, Argentina
- Height: 1.91 m (6 ft 3 in)
- Position: Goalkeeper

Team information
- Current team: Juan Pablo II College
- Number: 23

Youth career
- San Lorenzo

Senior career*
Years	Team	Apps	(Gls)
2008–2011	San Lorenzo	0	(0)
2008–2009	→ Platense (loan)	25	(0)
2010–2011	→ Tiro Federal (loan)	34	(0)
2011–2013	Instituto	4	(0)
2013–2014	Atlanta	41	(0)
2014–2018	Aldosivi	34	(0)
2019–	Deportivo Riestra	79	(0)
- * Club domestic league appearances and goals as of 19:11, 16 July 2022 (UTC)

Matías Alejandro Vega (born 18 April 1986) is an Argentine professional footballer who plays as a goalkeeper for Juan Pablo II College.

== Career ==
San Lorenzo were Vega's first club. After coming through the club's youth ranks, he was promoted into the first-team in 2008 and remained with San Lorenzo for three years but left in 2011 after not making an appearance for the club. His spell with San Lorenzo included two loan spells, the first was with Platense while the second was with Tiro Federal. After 25 appearances for the former and 34 for the latter, he returned to San Lorenzo and subsequently joined Instituto on a permanent transfer. Despite spending two seasons with Instituto, he made just four league appearances and left the club in July 2013.

Upon departing Instituto, he completed a move to Primera B Metropolitana club Atlanta. He went onto make 41 Primera B Metropolitana appearances for Atlanta in 2013–14. 2014 saw Vega move up a division as he completed a move to Primera B Nacional side Aldosivi. He made 6 appearances in his debut season for Aldosivi as the club won promotion into the 2015 Argentine Primera División. However, two years later Aldosivi were relegated back to Primera B Nacional; Vega had made nineteen appearances during the 2016–17 season. On 31 May 2019, Vega agreed a move to Deportivo Riestra ahead of the 2019–20 season.

== Career statistics ==
As of 1 June 2019.

Club statistics
Club	Season	League			Cup		League Cup		Continental		Other		Total	
Club	Season	Division	Apps	Goals	Apps	Goals	Apps	Goals	Apps	Goals	Apps	Goals	Apps	Goals
San Lorenzo	2008–09	Primera División	0	0	0	0	—		0	0	0	0	0	0
San Lorenzo	2009–10	Primera División	0	0	0	0	—		0	0	0	0	0	0
San Lorenzo	2010–11	Primera División	0	0	0	0	—		—		0	0	0	0
San Lorenzo	Total		0	0	0	0	—		0	0	0	0	0	0
Platense (loan)	2008–09	Primera B Nacional	25	0	0	0	—		—		0	0	25	0
Tiro Federal (loan)	2010–11	Primera B Nacional	34	0	0	0	—		—		0	0	34	0
Instituto	2011–12	Primera B Nacional	2	0	0	0	—		—		0	0	2	0
Instituto	2012–13	Primera B Nacional	2	0	0	0	—		—		0	0	2	0
Instituto	Total		4	0	0	0	—		—		0	0	4	0
Atlanta	2013–14	Primera B Metropolitana	41	0	1	0	—		—		0	0	42	0
Aldosivi	2014	Primera B Nacional	6	0	0	0	—		—		0	0	6	0
Aldosivi	2015	Primera División	0	0	0	0	—		—		0	0	0	0
Aldosivi	2016	Primera División	8	0	0	0	—		—		0	0	8	0
Aldosivi	2016–17	Primera División	19	0	0	0	—		—		0	0	19	0
Aldosivi	2017–18	Primera B Nacional	1	0	0	0	—		—		0	0	1	0
Aldosivi	2018–19	Primera División	0	0	0	0	—		—		0	0	0	0
Aldosivi	Total		34	0	0	0	—		—		0	0	34	0
Career total			138	0	1	0	—		0	0	0	0	139	0

== Honours ==
Aldosivi

- Primera B Nacional: 2017–18
