= Nicolás Bazzana =

Argentine footballer

Personal information
- Full name: Nicolás Bazzana
- Date of birth: 23 February 1996 (age 30)
- Place of birth: La Plata, Argentina
- Height: 1.83 m (6 ft 0 in)
- Position: Centre-back

Team information
- Current team: Douglas Haig

Youth career
- ADAFI
- 2003–2017: Estudiantes LP

Senior career*
Years	Team	Apps	(Gls)
2017–2021	Estudiantes LP	13	(1)
2019–2020	→ Aldosivi (loan)	12	(0)
2021	→ Sarmiento (loan)	30	(0)
2022	Delfín	18	(0)
2023	San Martín Tucumán	6	(0)
2024	Guillermo Brown	36	(1)
2025–	Douglas Haig	3	(0)
- * Club domestic league appearances and goals as of 17:24, 15 June 2025 (UTC)

Nicolás Bazzana (born 23 February 1996) is an Argentine professional footballer who plays as a centre-back for Douglas Haig.

== Career ==
Bazzana initially started in the youth system of ADAFI, prior to joining Estudiantes' ranks. After fourteen years in their system, he made his professional debut for the club on 25 May 2017 during a Copa Libertadores match against Botafogo; having previously been an unused substitute four times in all competitions in 2017. His Argentine Primera División debut arrived on 23 February 2018 versus Huracán. Bazzana scored the first goal of his career in Estudiantes' 2017–18 league finale with Rosario Central on 14 May.

On 25 January 2022, Bazzana moved to Ecuadorian Serie A side Delfín SC.

== Career statistics ==
As of 21 May 2018.

Club statistics
Club	Season	League			Cup (Note: Includes the Copa Argentina)		League Cup		Continental (Note: Includes the Copa Libertadores)		Other		Total	
Club	Season	Division	Apps	Goals	Apps	Goals	Apps	Goals	Apps	Goals	Apps	Goals	Apps	Goals
Estudiantes	2016–17	Primera División	0	0	0	0	—		1 (Note: One appearance in 2017 Copa Libertadores)	0	0	0	1	0
Estudiantes	2017–18	Primera División	2	1	0	0	—		0	0	0	0	2	1
Career total			2	1	0	0	—		1	0	0	0	3	1
