= Arbogast & Bastian =

American meat packing plant

- Company type: Private
- Industry: Meat packing industry
- Founded: 1887; 139 years ago
- Founder: Wilson Arbogast, Morris C. Bastian
- Defunct: January 9, 1985; 41 years ago
- Fate: Bankruptcy
- Headquarters: 25 Hamilton Street, Allentown, Pennsylvania, U.S.

Arbogast & Bastian, also known as A&B Meats, was the name of a slaughter-house and meat packing plant located in Allentown, Pennsylvania. Once a national leader in hog slaughtering, the company had the capacity to process most of the 850,000 hogs raised annually in Pennsylvania for slaughtering. In its heyday, Arbogast & Bastian slaughtered an average of 4,000 hogs daily.

Arbogast & Bastian was founded in 1887. The company operated for nearly a century prior to filing for Chapter 11 bankruptcy in 1984, citing cash flow issues brought about by market turmoil and labor disputes. The following year, in 1985, the company filed Chapter 7 bankruptcy.

With the exception of the company's offices and the storage building, the Arbogast & Bastian plant was demolished in the late 1990s.

The surviving offices were later incorporated into the America on Wheels museum, which was opened on the site of the former Arbogast & Bastian plant in 2008. The storage building was redeveloped, and became RB Collection: Ruozzi Brothers Collection, a trading and restoration center for classic and vintage automobiles, and Palazzo Reale, a residential complex with seven luxury residences. Both buildings, RB Collection and the America on Wheels museum, form what is called the Automobile Corner of America.

== History ==
=== 19th century ===
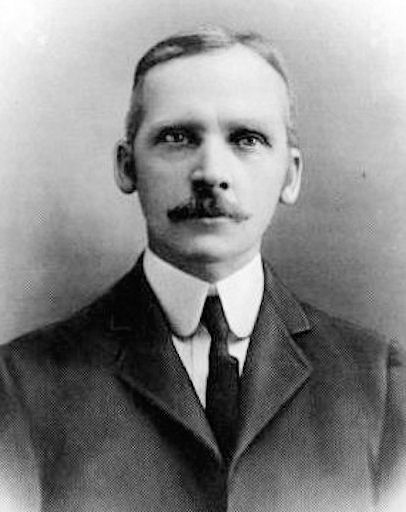
Wilson Arbogast, a co-founder of the company

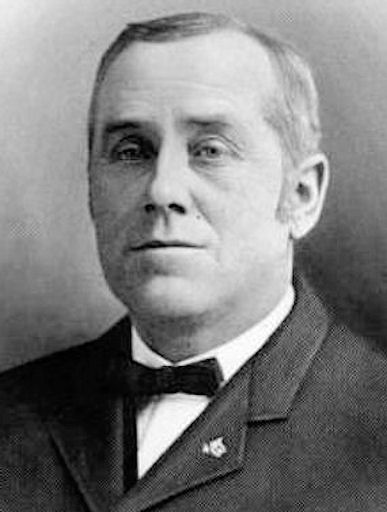
Morris Clinton Bastian, a co-founder of the company

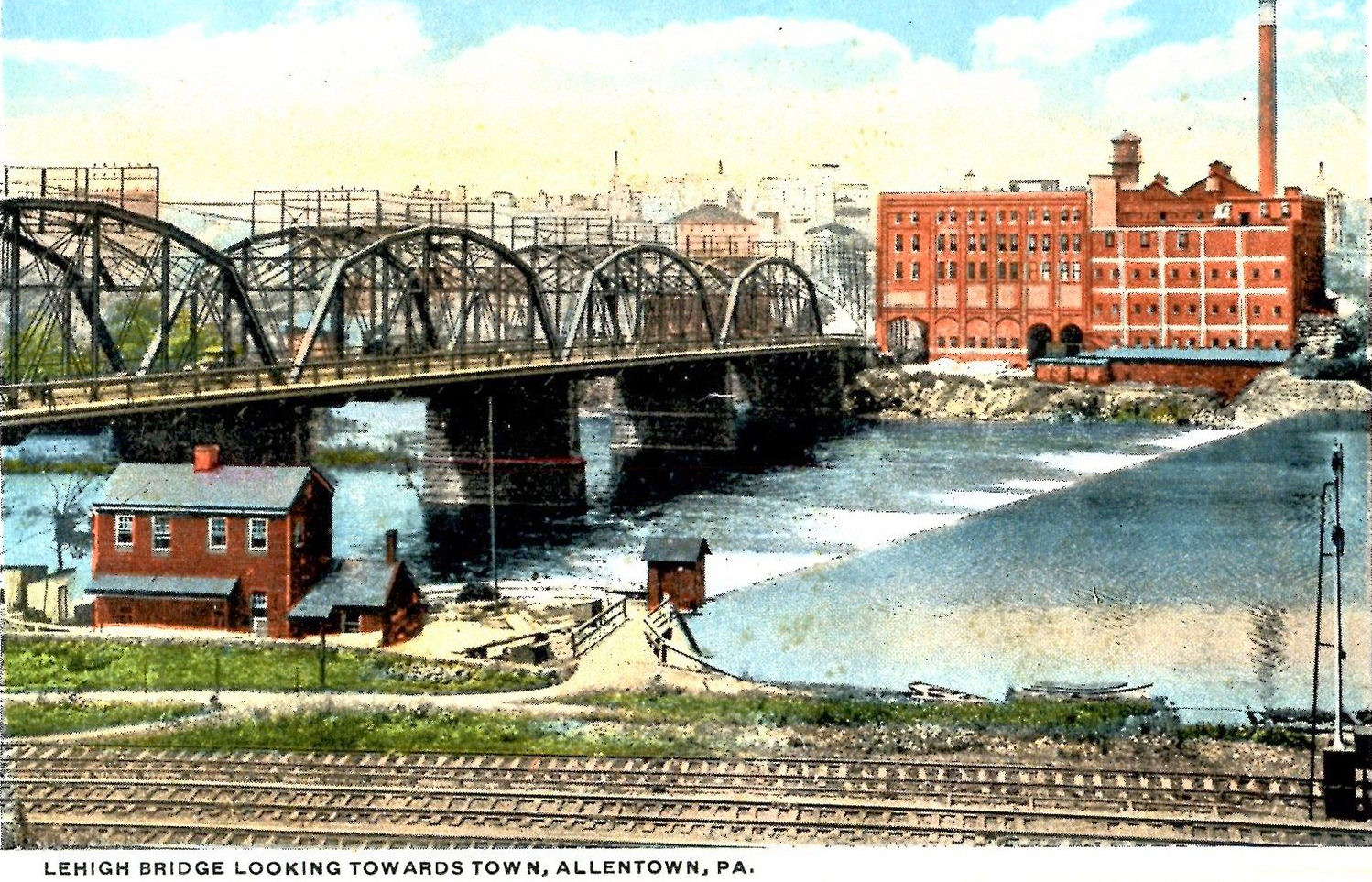
A 1910 illustration of Arbogast & Bastian's facility by the Hamilton Street Bridge and Dam on the Lehigh River

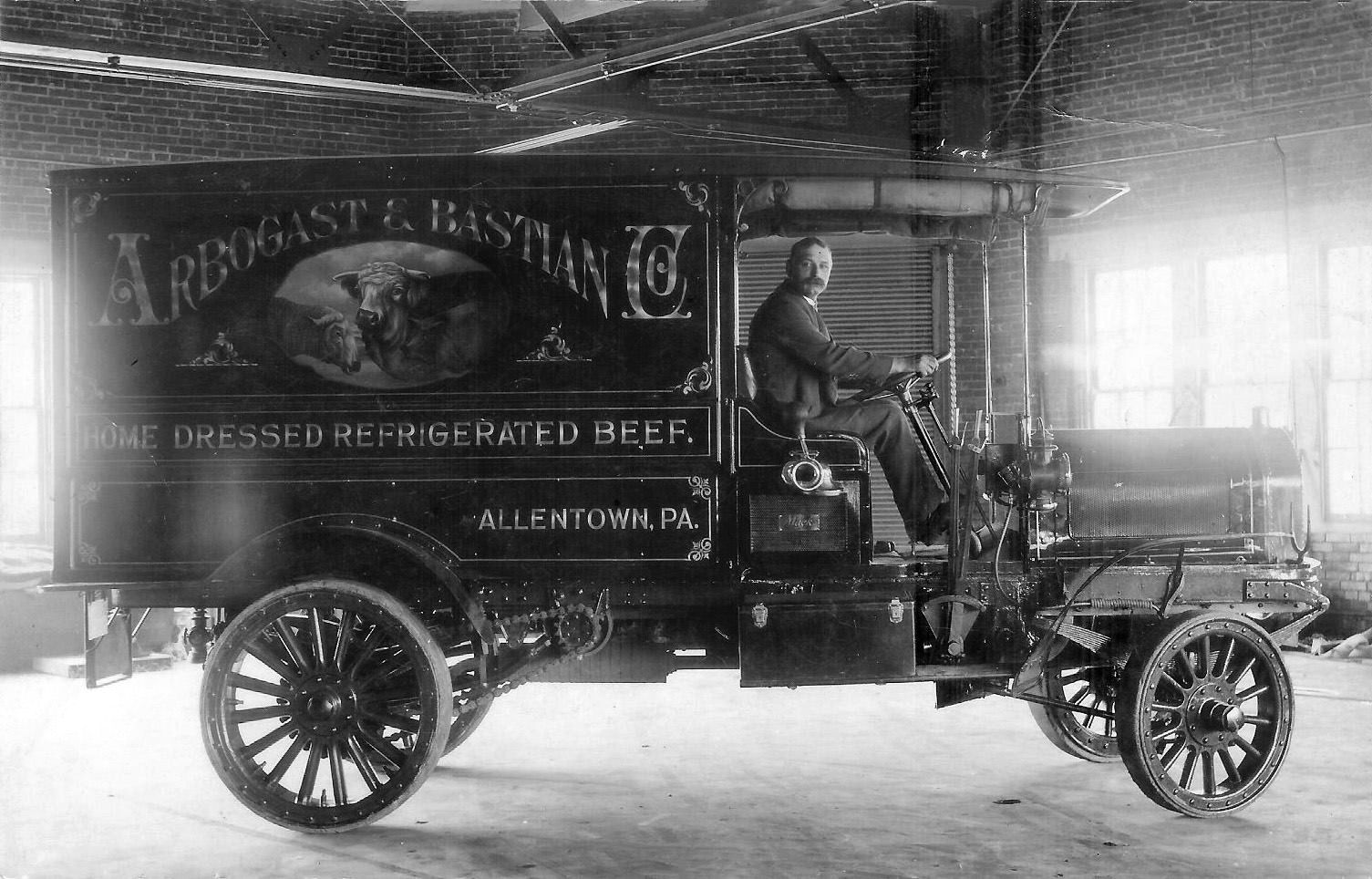
An Arbogast & Bastian Co. truck delivering home dressed refrigerated beef in a Mack Truck, c. 1915

The Arbogast & Bastian Company was founded in 1887 by Wilson Arbogast and Morris Clinton Bastian. Arbogast, who was born in Freeburg, Pennsylvania, in 1851, was a school teacher by training who entered the wholesale provisioning business in the early 1880s in Phillipsburg, New Jersey. Bastian, who was born in Lower Macungie Township, Pennsylvania, in 1859, operated a general store in Allentown.

The two partners built a two-story building and stable at 25 Hamilton Street, in Center City Allentown, purchased two horses, and started supplying provisions and lard to local businesses and distributors. They used their building as a smoke house, and offered freshly-smoked hams and bacon that were prepared using meat purchased ready-cured from other suppliers. Ready-cured meat is meat that, after slaughter and butchery, has been treated by curing in order to prevent the growth of bacteria and to reduce the opportunity for botulism to grow, allowing for safer transport and storage. This grew into a strong business for Arbogast & Bastian, since these goods previously had to be imported from New York City and Philadelphia, and suffered in freshness and quality because of the time required to get the finished product to Allentown.

In 1890, the company added a hog slaughtering department, in order to offer fresh pork and sausages to their customers. The capacity of the plant increased from 150 hogs per week at inception, to over 1,500 hogs per week in 1905. Pork brands offered included "Pure Home Rendered Lard" and "Old Dutch" hams and bacon.

Following their successful pork venture, Arbogast & Bastian expanded into beef, lamb, and mutton, first purchasing ready-cured meat from suppliers in the West, and ultimately building their own full-scale abattoir and cold-storage facilities on-site.

=== 20th century ===
By 1905, the company was processing over 150 head of cattle, and a similar number of lambs and sheep, weekly.

Arbogast & Bastian Company was formally incorporated in Pennsylvania, with $200,000 in capital ($7.44 million in 2025 dollars, adjusted for inflation.), on June 19, 1902. The additional capital raised by the corporation was used to purchase more land and build larger refrigeration facilities and a power plant. By 1905, Arbogast & Bastian's revenues exceeded $1 million per year, amounting to $35.83 million in 2025 dollars, adjusted for inflation.

The large Arbogast & Bastian facility occupied a prominent location along the Lehigh River at Hamilton and Front streets in Allentown, Pennsylvania. . The facility received livestock and transported goods via tracks run to the plant by the Lehigh Valley Railroad.

On July 14, 1905, a large fire destroyed the original Arbogast & Bastian plant, and the company rebuilt a larger, more modern facility. It was the first reinforced concrete meat-packing plant in the United States.

The Arbogast & Bastian plant, which allowed for more sanitary and safer operations, was designed and built in direct response to the unsanitary conditions in Chicago's meat-packing plants exposed by Upton Sinclair in his book, The Jungle, which led to the passage of the Meat Inspection Act and the Pure Food and Drug Act of 1906.

During World War II, 70 percent of Arbogast & Bastian's output went to the U.S. Armed Forces and through the Lend-Lease program to the United Kingdom, the Soviet Union, China, France, and other Allied nations.

By 1973, Arbogast & Bastian had 700 employees processing 160 million pounds (73 million kg) of meat a year, and the company had the capacity to butcher 7,200 hogs and 1,000 cattle weekly.

On May 11, 1984, Arbogast & Bastian filed for Chapter 11 bankruptcy, citing cash flow issues brought about by "two years of turbulent market conditions in the pork industry," a labor dispute with the Teamsters labor union and the recent shutdown of A&B's slaughtering operations. The bankruptcy was immediately triggered because one of the company's customers had issued a stop-payment on $800,000 worth of checks paid to Arbogast & Bastian.

The firm's financial woes were further worsened by four large meat packing companies, Pork Cutters, Inc., Rotches Pork Packers, Inc., Otto Doerrer and Son, Inc. and Crissman, Inc., which collectively failed to pay for nearly $5 million worth of pork carcasses and meat products purchased from Arbogast & Bastian in 1983 and 1984, according to the U.S. Department of Agriculture. About 380 workers lost their jobs.

Months after filing for bankruptcy, Purity Bacon Products Corp., one of A&B's most profitable divisions, was sold for $1 million to an investor group led by Richard A. Strouce, president of Arbogast & Bastian at the time it filed for bankruptcy.

The corporation filed for Chapter 7 liquidation on January 9, 1985.

With the closure of Arbogast & Bastian, only two major meat-processing facilities operate in Pennsylvania, Hatfield Quality Meats in Hatfield, Pennsylvania, and Martins Abattoir & Wholesale Meats, Inc., headquartered in Godwin, North Carolina.

== Legacy ==
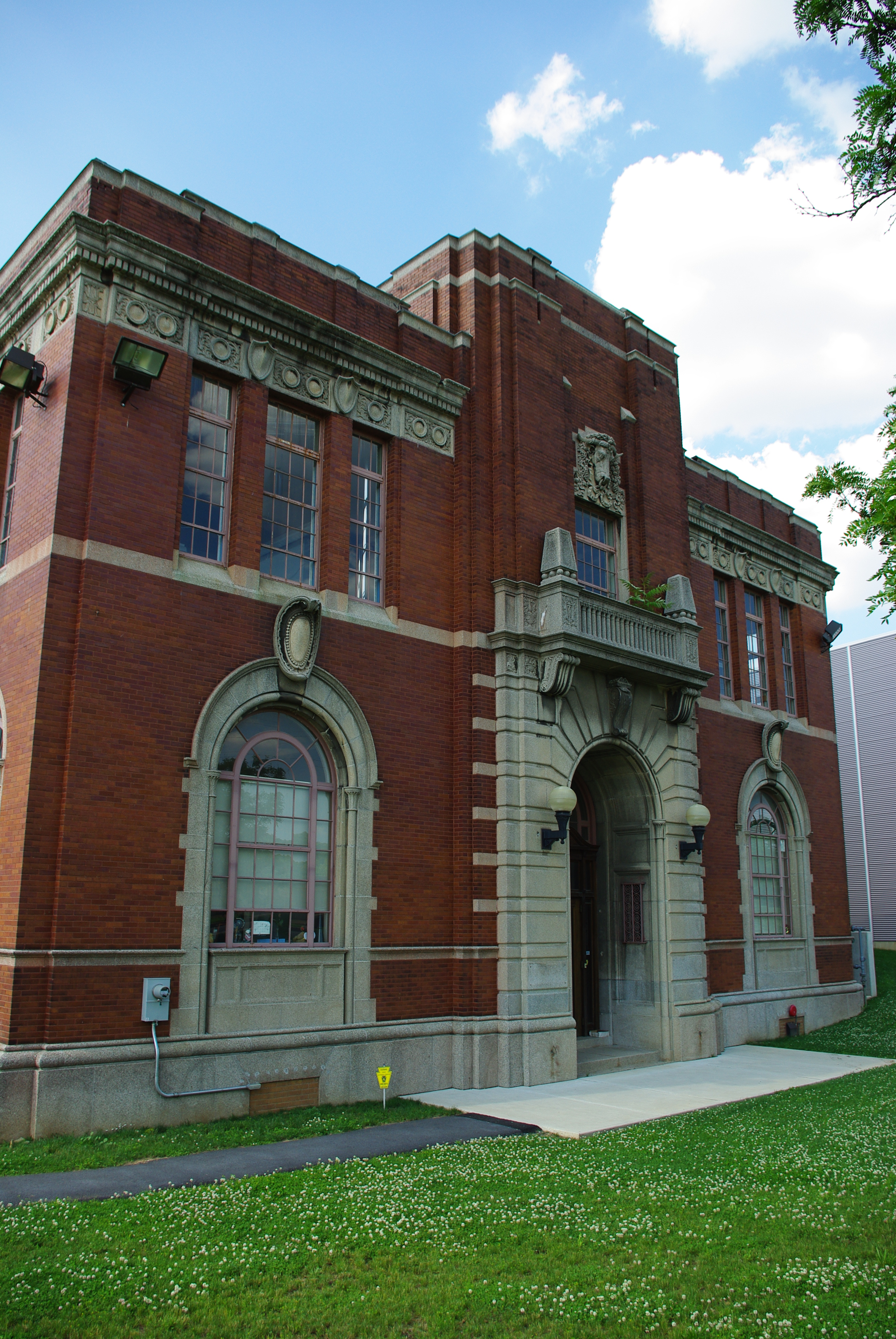
The former offices of Arbogast & Bastian, now the administrative office of America on Wheels museum

In 1989, city officials in Allentown announced plans to revitalize brownfield land along the Lehigh River, which included the abandoned Arbogast & Bastian plant.

The redevelopment, which was called "Lehigh Landing," was originally designed to include a museum, a brewery, walking trails, a footbridge across the river, and a promenade for festivals. Allentown businessman Raymond E. Holland, former president of Holiday Hair Fashions, purchased the abandoned Arbogast & Bastian plant for $250,000 in 1985 and, in 1990, gave it to the Allentown Economic Development Corp. as a charitable contribution. Development of "Lehigh Landing" was hindered by fundraising problems, environmental remediation issues, and even a national debate on pork barrel government spending.

The Arbogast & Bastian plant in Allentown remained vacant for over a decade, and was the subject of various episodes of vandalism and unresolved and suspicious fires.

The plant was dismantled in late 1990s. On June 30, 1998, the company's large heart-shaped sign, long a fixture of the Allentown skyline, was taken down.

The offices of Arbogast & Bastian, had not been torn down and were later incorporated into the America on Wheels museum, which was opened on the site of the former Arbogast & Bastian plant in 2008 and RB Collection-Ruozzi Brothers Collection / Palazzo Reale, occupying the redeveloped storage building.

Both buildings, the RB Collection and America on Wheels Museum, now form what is known as the Automobile Corner of America in Allentown.

== Bibliography ==
- Historic Homes And Institutions And Genealogical And Personal Memoirs Of The Lehigh Valley, Pennsylvania. Volume II, New York: Lewis Publishing, 1905.
- Lesley, Robert W. (1928), Concrete Factories: An illustrated review of the principles of construction of reinforced concrete buildings, New York: Bruce & Banning.
- List of Charters of Corporations Enrolled in the Office of the Secretary of the Commonwealth, June 1, 1901 – June 1, 1903, Harrisburg: Commonwealth of Pennsylvania, 1903.
- Roberts, Charles Rhoads; Stoudt, Rev. John Baer; Krick, Rev. Thomas H.; Dietrich, William J. (1914), History of Lehigh County Pennsylvania and a Genealogical and Biographical Records of its Families, vol. 2, Lehigh Valley Publishing Company
