= Wilson Stone =

Wilson Stone may refer to:

- Wilson Stone (politician) (1952–2022), American politician from Kentucky
- Wilson Stone (scientist) (1907–1968), American geneticist and zoologist
- The Braxton County Rune Stone, an artifact in the West Virginia State Museum
