= Juan Silva (footballer, born 1997) =

Argentine footballer

Personal information
- Full name: Juan Ignacio Silva
- Date of birth: 9 September 1997 (age 29)
- Place of birth: Berisso, Argentina
- Height: 1.77 m (5 ft 9 1/2 in)
- Position: Midfielder

Team information
- Current team: Guillermo Brown

Senior career*
Years	Team	Apps	(Gls)
2015–2018	Gimnasia LP	2	(0)
2018–2019	Aldosivi	0	(0)
2019–2021	Villa San Carlos	33	(0)
2022–	Guillermo Brown	18	(0)
- * Club domestic league appearances and goals as of 20:24, 24 July 2022 (UTC)

Juan Ignacio Silva (born 9 September 1997) is an Argentine professional footballer who plays as a midfielder for Guillermo Brown.

== Career ==
Silva began with Argentine Primera División side Gimnasia y Esgrima. He was twice an unused substitute during 2015 in games against Estudiantes and Huracán, prior to making his professional debut on 11 May 2015 in a goalless draw against Sarmiento. Silva joined Aldosivi, a fellow Primera División team, on 16 July 2018.

== Career statistics ==
As of 9 September 2018.

Club statistics
Club	Season	League			Cup (Note: Includes the Copa Argentina)		League Cup		Continental (Note: Includes the Copa Sudamericana)		Other		Total	
Club	Season	Division	Apps	Goals	Apps	Goals	Apps	Goals	Apps	Goals	Apps	Goals	Apps	Goals
Gimnasia y Esgrima	2015	Primera División	1	0	0	0	—		—		0	0	1	0
Gimnasia y Esgrima	2016	Primera División	0	0	0	0	—		—		0	0	0	0
Gimnasia y Esgrima	2016–17	Primera División	1	0	0	0	—		0	0	0	0	1	0
Gimnasia y Esgrima	2017–18	Primera División	0	0	0	0	—		—		0	0	0	0
Gimnasia y Esgrima	Total		2	0	0	0	—		0	0	0	0	2	0
Aldosivi	2018–19	Primera División	0	0	1	0	—		—		0	0	1	0
Career total			2	0	1	0	—		0	0	0	0	3	0
