= Jonatan Benedetti =

Argentine professional footballer

Personal information
- Full name: Jonatan Nahuel Benedetti
- Date of birth: 26 March 1997 (age 29)
- Place of birth: Mar del Plata, Argentina
- Height: 1.80 m (5 ft 11 in)
- Position: Forward

Team information
- Current team: Círculo Deportivo

Youth career
- Aldosivi

Senior career*
Years	Team	Apps	(Gls)
2017–2020	Aldosivi	6	(0)
2018–2019	→ San Telmo (loan)	48	(10)
2019–2020	→ All Boys (loan)	5	(0)
2020	Paternò	2	(0)
2021–	Círculo Deportivo	0	(0)
- * Club domestic league appearances and goals as of 21:09, 12 February 2021 (UTC)

Jonatan Nahuel Benedetti (born 26 March 1997) is an Argentine professional footballer who plays as a forward for Círculo Deportivo.

== Career ==
Benedetti started his professional career in 2017 with hometown club Aldosivi. His debut came in the Primera División on 7 May, coming on as a substitute in a 0–3 defeat to Huracán. His first start came in the Copa Argentina on 12 June against Central Córdoba as he scored the winning goal to send Aldosivi into the next round. In January 2018, Benedetti completed a loan move to Primera B Metropolitana side San Telmo. He scored on his debut for the club in a 2–1 win over Deportivo Español on 28 January. Benedetti spent the 2019–20 campaign on loan in Primera B Nacional with All Boys. He appeared five times, all of the bench.

In mid-2020, Benedetti had trials in European football with Italian Serie D outfit Licata and Bulgarian First League team Etar. In October, Benedetti penned terms in Italy's fourth tier with Paternò. After just two appearances in Serie D, Benedetti headed back to his homeland with Círculo Deportivo of Torneo Federal A.

== Career statistics ==
As of 12 February 2021.

Club statistics
Club	Season	League			Cup		League Cup		Continental		Other		Total	
Club	Season	Division	Apps	Goals	Apps	Goals	Apps	Goals	Apps	Goals	Apps	Goals	Apps	Goals
Aldosivi	2016–17	Primera División	5	0	1	1	—		—		0	0	6	1
Aldosivi	2017–18	Primera B Nacional	1	0	0	0	—		—		0	0	1	0
Aldosivi	Total		6	0	1	1	—		—		0	0	7	1
San Telmo (loan)	2017–18	Primera B Metropolitana	17	5	0	0	—		—		0	0	17	5
San Telmo (loan)	2018–19	Primera B Metropolitana	31	5	0	0	—		—		0	0	31	5
San Telmo (loan)	Total		48	10	0	0	—		—		0	0	48	10
All Boys (loan)	2019–20	Primera B Nacional	5	0	0	0	—		—		0	0	5	0
Paternò	2020–21	Serie D	2	0	0	0	0	0	—		0	0	2	0
Círculo Deportivo	2021	Torneo Federal A	0	0	0	0	—		—		0	0	0	0
Career total			61	5	1	1	0	0	—		0	0	62	6
