= Yoel Juárez =

Argentine footballer (born 2002)

Personal information
- Full name: Yoel Gustavo Juárez
- Date of birth: 20 March 2002 (age 24)
- Place of birth: Buenos Aires, Argentina
- Position: Forward

Team information
- Current team: Aldosivi

Youth career
- Independiente Mar del Plata
- Aldosivi

Senior career*
Years	Team	Apps	(Gls)
2019–	Aldosivi	3	(0)
2021	→ Santamarina (loan)	13	(1)
2023–2024	→ Circulo Deportivo (loan)	13	(1)

International career
2019	Argentina U17	3	(0)
- * Club domestic league appearances and goals as of 19:15, 15 January 2025 (UTC)

Yoel Gustavo Juárez (born 20 March 2002) is an Argentine professional footballer who plays as a forward for Aldosivi.

== Club career ==
Juárez was produced by the Independiente Mar del Plata and Aldosivi academies. At the age of sixteen, on 15 March 2019, Juárez made the move into senior football under manager Gustavo Álvarez, who selected the forward as a substitute for a Primera División match with Colón. He was subsequently subbed on in place of Alan Ruiz, featuring for the final twenty-four minutes of a 3–0 victory.

On 31 January 2021, Juárez was sent out on loan to Santamarina for the 2021 season.

== International career ==
In July 2017, Juárez was called up by Diego Placente to train with the Argentina U15s. Two years later, Juárez represented Argentina under Placente at U17 level in Russia at the 2019 Granatkin Memorial. He made three appearances as they won the competition, beating the hosts in the final.

== Career statistics ==
As of 14 June 2019.

Appearances and goals by club, season and competition
Club	Season	League			Cup		League Cup		Continental		Other		Total	
Club	Season	Division	Apps	Goals	Apps	Goals	Apps	Goals	Apps	Goals	Apps	Goals	Apps	Goals
Aldosivi	2018–19	Primera División	2	0	1	0	0	0	—		0	0	3	0
Career total			2	0	1	0	0	0	—		0	0	3	0

== Honours ==
Argentina U17

- Granatkin Memorial: 2019
