= Gastón Gil Romero =

Argentine footballer

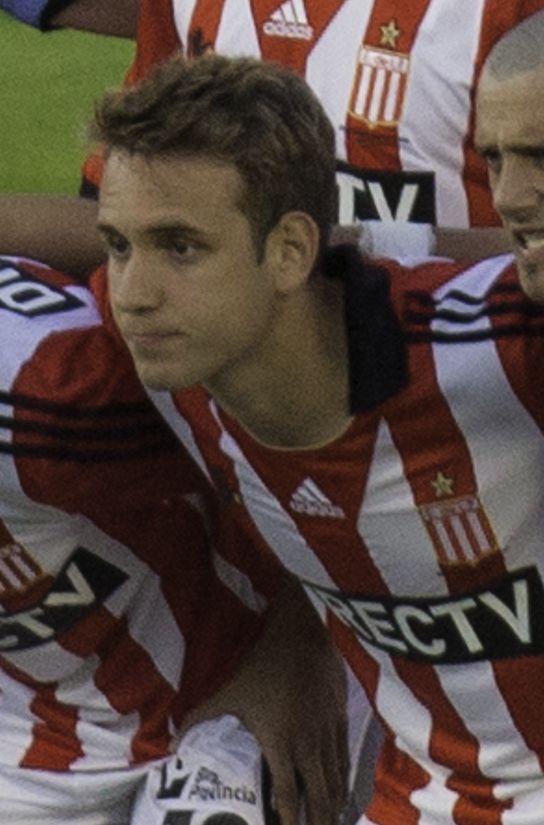
- Gil Romero with Estudiantes in 2014

Personal information
- Full name: Gastón Gil Romero
- Date of birth: 6 May 1993 (age 33)
- Place of birth: General Roca, Argentina
- Height: 1.77 m (5 ft 10 in)
- Position: Defensive midfielder

Team information
- Current team: Godoy Cruz

Youth career
- Estudiantes

Senior career*
Years	Team	Apps	(Gls)
2012–2019	Estudiantes	85	(1)
2016	→ Rosario Central (loan)	5	(0)
2017	→ Universidad Católica (loan)	36	(0)
2018	→ Patronato (loan)	12	(0)
2018	→ Belgrano (loan)	9	(0)
2019	→ Patronato (loan)	6	(0)
2019–2021	Aldosivi	50	(0)
2022	Atlético Tucumán	21	(0)
2023	Guaraní	31	(0)
2024	Independiente Rivadavia	15	(1)
2024–2026	Audax Italiano	27	(0)
2026–	Godoy Cruz	1	(0)
- * Club domestic league appearances and goals as of 19:00, 18 March 2026 (UTC)

Gastón Gil Romero (born 6 May 1993) is an Argentine professional footballer who plays as a defensive midfielder for Primera Nacional club Godoy Cruz.

== Career ==
Gil Romero made his debut in the 2011–12 season. He scored his first professional goal at 8 August 2013 against All Boys. It was the only goal in a home win.

In the second half of 2024, Gil Romero moved to Chile and joined Audax Italiano from Independiente Rivadavia.
