= Wilson Altamirano =

Argentine footballer

Personal information
- Full name: Wilson Iván Altamirano
- Date of birth: 7 April 1998 (age 28)
- Place of birth: Villa Allende, Argentina
- Height: 1.88 m (6 ft 2 in)
- Position: Midfielder

Youth career
- Quilmes de Villa Allende
- –2017: Belgrano

Senior career*
Years	Team	Apps	(Gls)
2017–2021	Belgrano	3	(0)
2017	→ Las Palmas (loan)	15	(0)
2019–2020	→ Villa San Carlos (loan)	16	(0)
2020	→ Gimnasia Jujuy (loan)	2	(0)
2022	Argentino Peñarol		
- * Club domestic league appearances and goals as of 30 June 2020

Wilson Iván Altamirano (born 7 April 1998) is an Argentine professional footballer who plays as a midfielder.

== Career ==
Altamirano's senior career started with Belgrano, having been signed from Quilmes de Villa Allende. In 2017, Altamirano was loaned to Torneo Federal B club Las Palmas. Fifteen appearances followed. Back with Belgrano in 2018, Lucas Bernardi moved the midfielder into his first-team squad for the 2018–19 Argentine Primera División campaign, selecting him as an unused substitute in a league win over Estudiantes on 24 August. Altamirano made his professional debut two months later, on 22 October, during a 1–1 draw with Banfield.

In January 2022, Altamirano joined Argentino Peñarol.

== Career statistics ==
As of 2 November 2018

Appearances and goals by club, season and competition
Club	Season	League			National Cup		League Cup		Continental		Other		Total	
Club	Season	Division	Apps	Goals	Apps	Goals	Apps	Goals	Apps	Goals	Apps	Goals	Apps	Goals
Belgrano	2017–18	Primera División	0	0	0	0	—		—		—		0	0
Belgrano	2018–19	Primera División	3	0	0	0	0	0	—		—		3	0
Belgrano	2019–20	Primera B Nacional	0	0	0	0	—		—		—		0	0
Belgrano	Total		3	0	0	0	0	0	0	0	0	0	3	0
Las Palmas (loan)	2017	Torneo Federal B	15	0	—		—		—		—		15	0
Villa San Carlos (loan)	2019–20	Primera B Metropolitana	16	0	0	0	—		—		—		16	0
Career total			34	0	0	0	0	0	0	0	0	0	34	0
