= Wilson Hicks (politician) =

Mississippi politician

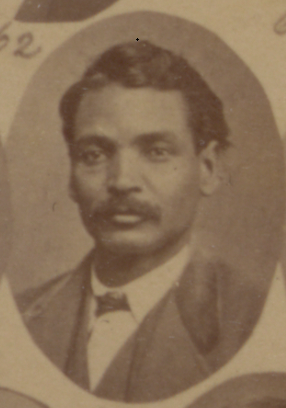

Wilson Hicks was a state legislator in Mississippi. He represented Rankin County, Mississippi in the Mississippi House of Representatives in 1874 and 1875. He was a Republican and was of the last generation of African-Americans to be elected to state office in Mississippi prior to what was then called "the end to Republican reconstruction" in Mississippi.

He had a wife and children. His 6 year-old son reportedly shot himself while handling a pistol.

In 1876, Hicks was reported to be a "mail rider". In 1896 he was chosen to serve as a commissioner for the "Negro Department" of the Tennessee Centennial.

== See also ==
- African American officeholders from the end of the Civil War until before 1900
- History of Mississippi
