= Francisco Leonardo =

Argentine footballer

Personal information
- Full name: Francisco Leonardo
- Date of birth: 12 April 1996 (age 30)
- Place of birth: Mar del Plata, Argentina
- Height: 1.74 m (5 ft 8 1/2 in)
- Position: Forward

Team information
- Current team: Círculo Deportivo

Senior career*
Years	Team	Apps	(Gls)
2016–2018	Aldosivi	5	(0)
2019–	Círculo Deportivo	12	(4)
- * Club domestic league appearances and goals as of 17:11, 24 December 2019 (UTC)

Francisco Leonardo (born 12 April 1996) is an Argentine professional footballer who plays as a forward for Torneo Federal A side Club Círculo Deportivo.

== Career ==
Leonardo began with Aldosivi of the Argentine Primera División in 2016, making two appearances in the first half of the 2016–17 season; coming on as a substitute in games against Tigre and Patronato respectively. He made one more appearance in the season that ended with relegation to Primera B Nacional.

== Career statistics ==
As of 10 May 2018.

Club statistics
Club	Season	League			Cup (Note: Includes the Copa Argentina.)		League Cup		Continental		Other		Total	
Club	Season	Division	Apps	Goals	Apps	Goals	Apps	Goals	Apps	Goals	Apps	Goals	Apps	Goals
Aldosivi	2016–17	Primera División	3	0	0	0	—		—		0	0	3	0
Aldosivi	2017–18	Primera B Nacional	2	0	0	0	—		—		0	0	2	0
Career total			5	0	0	0	—		—		0	0	5	0

== Honours ==
Aldosivi

- Primera B Nacional: 2017–18
