= Leonardo Sánchez =

Argentine footballer

Personal information
- Full name: Leonardo Agustín Sánchez
- Date of birth: 2 August 1986 (age 40)
- Place of birth: La Plata, Buenos Aires, Argentina
- Height: 1.91 m (6 ft 3 in)
- Position: Centre back

Senior career*
Years	Team	Apps	(Gls)
2007–2008	Estudiantes		
2008–2010	San Martín-SJ	67	(5)
2010–2011	Chacarita Juniors	35	(1)
2011–2012	Independiente Rivadavia	25	(0)
2012–2013	Instituto	19	(0)
2013	Argentinos Juniors	5	(0)
2013–2015	Unión	62	(6)
2016	FC Zürich	11	(0)
2016–2018	Unión	24	(2)
2018–2019	Aldosivi	4	(0)
- * Club domestic league appearances and goals as of 3 June 2016 ‡ National team caps and goals as of 10 January 2016

Leonardo Agustín Sánchez (born 2 August 1986) is an Argentinean footballer who plays as a defender.
