= Jonathan Farías =

Argentine footballer

Jonathan Farias
Personal information
- Full name: Jonathan Leonardo Farías
- Date of birth: 27 March 1998 (age 28)
- Place of birth: Buenos Aires, Argentina
- Height: 1.78 m (5 ft 10 in)
- Position: Midfielder

Team information
- Current team: Agropecuario

Youth career
- 2016–2017: Boca Juniors
- 2017–2018: Cercle Brugge

Senior career*
Years	Team	Apps	(Gls)
2018–2019	Cercle Brugge	1	(0)
2019	Aldosivi	0	(0)
2020–2021	Defensa y Justicia	0	(0)
2021–	Agropecuario	27	(3)
- * Club domestic league appearances and goals as of 22:41, 22 May 2022 (UTC)

Jonathan Leonardo Farías (born 27 March 1998) is an Argentine footballer currently playing as a midfielder for Agropecuario.

== Career ==
Farias left Cercle Brugge and on 1 February 2019 it was confirmed, that Farias had signed with Aldosivi, but at the beginning would play with the reserve squad. He left the club at the end of 2019.

== Career statistics ==
=== Club ===
As of 6 May 2018.

Club	Season	League			Cup		Continental		Other		Total	
Club	Season	Division	Apps	Goals	Apps	Goals	Apps	Goals	Apps	Goals	Apps	Goals
Cercle Brugge	2017–18	Belgian First Division B	1	0	0	0	–		0	0	1	0
Aldosivi	2018–19	Argentine Primera División	0	0	0	0	–		0	0	0	0
Aldosivi	2019–20	Argentine Primera División	0	0	0	0	–		0	0	0	0
Aldosivi	Total		0	0	0	0	0	0	0	0	0	0
Defensa y Justicia	2020–21	Argentine Primera División	0	0	0	0	–		3 (Note: Appearances in the Copa de la Liga Profesional)	0	3	0
Agropecuario	2021	Primera Nacional	22	3	0	0	–		0	0	22	3
Agropecuario	2022	Primera Nacional	5	0	1 (Note: Appearances in the Copa Argentina)	0	–		0	0	6	0
Agropecuario	Total		27	3	1	0	0	0	0	0	28	3
Career total			28	3	1	0	0	0	3	0	32	3
