= Wilson Smith (disambiguation) =

Wilson Smith may refer to:

- Wilson Smith (1897–1965), British physician, virologist, and immunologist
- Wilson Smith (Medal of Honor) (1841–1901), American Civil War Union Army corporal awarded the Medal of Honor
- Wilson Smith (musician), American past member of the surf band Royale Monarchs
- Wilson G. Smith (1855–1929), American composer and writer
