= Cain Fara =

Argentine professional footballer

Personal information
- Full name: Cain Jair Fara
- Date of birth: 6 March 1994 (age 32)
- Place of birth: Rosario, Argentina
- Height: 1.84 m (6 ft 1/2 in)
- Position: Centre back

Team information
- Current team: Universitario de Deportes
- Number: 2

Youth career
- Rosario Central

Senior career*
Years	Team	Apps	(Gls)
2016–2017	Rosario Central	0	(0)
2016–2017	→ Juventud Antoniana (loan)	8	(0)
2017–2018	Estudiantes	23	(3)
2018–2019	Ferro Carril Oeste	6	(0)
2019–2020	Aldosivi	9	(0)
2020	Sol de América	1	(0)
2021	Tigre	5	(0)
2022	Aucas	21	(0)
2023	Emelec	12	(0)
2024–2025	Atlanta	36	(0)
2026-	Universitario de Deportes	14	(2)
- * Club domestic league appearances and goals as of 16:38, 20 July 2025 (UTC)

Cain Jair Fara (born 6 March 1994) is an Argentine professional footballer who plays as a centre back for Universitario de Deportes.

== Career ==
Fara began with Rosario Central. On 30 November 2011, Fara joined Juventud Antoniana on loan. He made his debut in December against San Jorge, which was the first of eleven appearances. He terminated his Rosario contract in 2017, before joining Primera B Metropolitana's Estudiantes. Fara scored his first senior goal during a match against Tristán Suárez on 4 November. Two further goals came as Estudiantes placed second. On 2 July 2018, Fara moved to Primera B Nacional with Ferro Carril Oeste. He was sent off in his sixth game, which was his fifth career red card in just forty-three fixtures.

== International career ==
On 21 May 2026, it was reported that Fara will be called up to the Palestinian national football team.

== Career statistics ==
As of 30 December 2018.

Club statistics
Club	Season	League			Cup		Continental		Other		Total	
Club	Season	Division	Apps	Goals	Apps	Goals	Apps	Goals	Apps	Goals	Apps	Goals
Rosario Central	2016–17	Primera División	0	0	0	0	—		0	0	0	0
Juventud Antoniana (loan)	2016–17	Torneo Federal A	8	0	0	0	—		3 (Note: Appearance(s) in the Torneo Federal A play-offs)	0	11	0
Estudiantes	2017–18	Primera B Metropolitana	23	3	0	0	—		3 (Note: Appearance(s) in the Primera B Metropolitana play-offs)	0	26	3
Ferro Carril Oeste	2018–19	Primera B Nacional	6	0	0	0	—		0	0	6	0
Career total			37	3	0	0	—		6	0	43	3

== Honours ==
Club Atlético Tigre

- 2021 Primera Nacional

Aucas

- Ecuadorian Serie A: 2022
