= Club Atlético Villa San Carlos =

Argentine association football club

Villa San Carlos
- Full name: Club Atlético Villa San Carlos
- Nickname: Villeros
- Founded: 25 April 1925; 100 years ago
- Ground: Estadio Gennasio Salice, Berisso
- Capacity: 2,000
- Chairman: Alejandro Colombo
- Manager: Jorge Vivaldo
- League: Primera B Metropolitana
Home colours	Away colours

Club Social y Deportivo Villa San Carlos is an Argentine football club based in the city of Berisso (nearly La Plata) in Buenos Aires Province. The team currently plays in the Primera B Metropolitana, the regionalised third level of the Argentine football league system.

== History ==
On May 25, 2013, San Carlos won the Primera B Metropolitana championship therefore promoting to Primera B Nacional. The squad beat Barracas Central by 1–0.

== Players ==
=== Current squad ===
As of 24 March 2020

Note: Flags indicate national team as defined under FIFA eligibility rules; some limited exceptions apply. Players may hold more than one non-FIFA nationality.

No.	Pos.	Nation	Player
—	GK	ARG	Rodrigo Benítez
—	GK	ARG	Nicolás Tauber
—	DF	ARG	Ezequil Aguimcer
—	DF	ARG	Alejo Lloyaiy
—	DF	ARG	Adrián Lugones
—	DF	ARG	Luciano Machín
—	DF	ARG	Manuel Molina
—	DF	ARG	Agustín Prida
—	DF	ARG	Germán Ré
—	DF	ARG	Juan Saborido
—	DF	ARG	Federico Slezack
—	MF	ARG	Alexis Alegre
—	MF	ARG	Wilson Altamirano (on loan from Belgrano)
—	MF	ARG	Maximiliano Badell
—	MF	ARG	Matías Catena

No.	Pos.	Nation	Player
—	MF	ARG	Matías Grasso
—	MF	ARG	Ignacio Guerrico
—	MF	ARG	Iván Massi
—	MF	ARG	Ignacio Oroná
—	MF	ARG	Gonzalo Raverta
—	MF	ARG	Juan Ignacio Silva
—	MF	ARG	Matías Sproat
—	FW	ARG	Tomás Bolzicco
—	FW	ARG	Lucas Calderón (on loan from Belgrano)
—	FW	ARG	Wilson Gómez
—	FW	ARG	Nahuel Luna (on loan from Estudiantes)
—	FW	ARG	Pablo Miranda
—	FW	PAR	Samuel Portillo
—	FW	ARG	Siro Ramírez
—	FW	ARG	Bryan Schmidt

=== Out on loan ===
Note: Flags indicate national team as defined under FIFA eligibility rules; some limited exceptions apply. Players may hold more than one non-FIFA nationality.

No.	Pos.	Nation	Player
—	MF	ARG	Angel Emanuel Luna (at Ituzaingó until 30 June 2020)
—	FW	ARG	Matías Brianese (at Sportivo Italiano until 31 December 2020)

== Notable coaches ==
- (Argentina) Marcelo Javier Zuleta
- (Argentina) Julián Camino

== Honours ==
- Primera B: 2012–13
- Primera C: 2008–09
- Primera D: 1992–93, 2001–02
