= 2019–20 Guillermo Brown de Puerto Madryn season =

Association football season

Guillermo Brown
2019–20 season
- President: Carlos Eliceche
- Manager: Marcelo Broggi
- Stadium: Estadio Raúl Conti

The 2019–20 season is Guillermo Brown's 6th consecutive season in the second division of Argentine football, Primera B Nacional.

The season generally covers the period from 1 July 2019 to 30 June 2020.

== Review ==
=== Pre-season ===
Ascenso MX side Atlante signed Federico Rasmussen on 6 June 2019, as the centre-back became Guillermo Brown's first departure of 2019–20. Youngster Elvio Gelmini followed Rasmussen out the door as he agreed to join Defensores de Belgrano on 10 June. A triple signing was made by the club on 13 June, with Franco Agüero (GK, Sansinena), Kevin Ceceri (LB, Unattached - most recently with Linense) and Mateo Ramírez (MF, Gimnasia y Esgrima (M) putting pen to paper on contracts. A loan for Lautaro Parisi was confirmed on 25 June, with the forward set to spend the campaign with Arsenal de Sarandí of the Primera División. Experienced midfielder Jorge Velázquez left on 27 June, making a move to Barracas Central. He was matched in going by Sebastián Giovini.

Mateo Acosta officially returned from his previous season loan at Gimnasia y Esgrima (M) on 30 June. On 4 July, Guillermo Brown completed the loan signing of Matías Ruíz Díaz from Estudiantes (LP). Acassuso communicated the signing of Julián Bartolo hours later. Mauro Osores was loaned from Primera División team Atlético Tucumán on 19 July. Julián Bonetto, who spent the past season in Torneo Federal A with Alvarado, arrived to Guillermo Brown on 20 July. Abel Méndez and Rodrigo Depetris completed moves in on 23 July, a day prior to the arrivals of Diego Herner, César Taborda and Braian Maya. On 24 July, Guillermo Brown contested their first pre-season game against Sol de Mayo - with a two-goal loss being followed by a goalless draw in Puerto Madryn.

25 July saw Facundo Soloa join on loan from Atlético de Rafaela, with Estudiantes' Mauricio Vera doing likewise on 2 August. Days before, Guillermo Brown beat Gaiman 3–0 in an exhibition fixture on 30 July. Then, on 3 August, they and Chacarita Juniors shared victories in friendlies; with new signing Abel Méndez sealing Guillermo Brown's win. On 5 August, Temperley were defeated in a friendly thanks to goals from Joel Martínez (2) and Méndez; in the day's secondary encounter, their opponents reversed the scoreline for a victory. Guillermo Brown failed to beat Atlanta in pre-season encounters on 7 August, with the newly-promoted Primera B Nacional team winning and drawing. In the week after, Leandro Lugarzo, Facundo Pumpido and Ezequiel Ávila joined.

=== August ===
On 18 August, Barracas Central visited the Estadio Raúl Conti and took away all three points in each club's first 2019–20 fixture in Primera B Nacional. A second straight defeat came on 24 August, with Deportivo Morón running out one-nil winners in Buenos Aires.

=== September ===
September opened with a home loss to Temperley for Guillermo Brown, with Enzo Baglivo netting the game's sole goal on 1 September - making it three consecutive defeats for Marcelo Broggi.

== Squad ==
Squad No.	Nationality	Name	Position(s)	Date of birth (age)	Signed from
Goalkeepers
	Argentina	Franco Agüero	GK	24 March 1993 (age 33)	Sansinena
	Argentina	Mateo Grasso	GK	6 December 1995 (age 30)	CAI
	Argentina	Gonzalo Laborda	GK	13 January 1995 (age 31)	Academy
	Argentina	Braian Maya	GK	18 September 1992 (age 34)	J.J. Moreno
	Argentina	César Taborda	GK	23 January 1984 (age 42)	Central Córdoba
Defenders
	Uruguay	Juan Alsina	DF	15 November 1989 (age 36)	Liverpool
	Argentina	Mauro Bazán	RB	27 April 1993 (age 33)	Atlanta
	Argentina	Kevin Ceceri	LB	2 February 1996 (age 30)	Linense
	Argentina	Christian Cepeda	CB	5 February 1991 (age 35)	UAI Urquiza
	Argentina	Matías Cupayolo	DF	19 December 1997 (age 28)	Academy
	Argentina	Guillermo Ferracuti	LB	11 February 1991 (age 35)	Sarmiento
	Argentina	Diego Herner	CB	31 July 1983 (age 43)	Alvarado
	Argentina	Leandro Lugarzo	CB	20 July 1990 (age 36)	Almagro
	Argentina	Mauro Osores	CB	20 February 1997 (age 29)	Atlético Tucumán (loan)
	Argentina	Fabrizio Romero	DF	30 May 1999 (age 27)	Academy
	Argentina	Matías Ruíz Díaz	RB	9 September 1996 (age 30)	Estudiantes (LP) (loan)
	Argentina	Luciano Sánchez	CB	15 September 1994 (age 32)	Sportivo Italiano
Midfielders
	Argentina	Ezequiel Ávila	LM	30 May 1994 (age 32)	Cipolletti
	Argentina	Lucas Bossio	DM	6 March 1990 (age 36)	San Martín (T)
	Argentina	Elian Coronas	MF	30 April 2000 (age 26)	Academy
	Argentina	Mauro Cortéz	MF	28 July 1999 (age 27)	Academy
	Argentina	Rodrigo Depetris	RW	5 May 1990 (age 36)	Alvarado
	Argentina	Cristian García	MF	22 July 1996 (age 30)	CAI
	Argentina	Fabián Monserrat	RM	25 June 1992 (age 34)	Atlanta
	Argentina	Emanuel Moreno	LM	19 March 1990 (age 36)	Los Andes
	Argentina	Cristian Muga	MF		CAI
	Argentina	Mateo Ramírez	MF	18 January 1995 (age 31)	Gimnasia y Esgrima (M)
	Argentina	Facundo Soloa	CM	4 November 1996 (age 30)	Atlético de Rafaela (loan)
	Argentina	Lucas Urdininea	MF	6 July 2000 (age 26)	Academy
	Argentina	Mauricio Vera	AM	8 May 1997 (age 29)	Estudiantes (loan)
Forwards
	Argentina	Mateo Acosta	FW	22 September 1992 (age 34)	Almagro
	Argentina	Hernán Altolaguirre	FW	19 February 1993 (age 33)	Rivadavia
	Argentina	Julián Bonetto	FW	10 June 1994 (age 32)	Alvarado
	Argentina	Sergio González	CF	5 April 1995 (age 31)	Lanús (loan)
	Argentina	Joel Martínez	CF	10 April 1996 (age 30)	Lanús (loan)
	Argentina	Abel Méndez	FW	27 October 1992 (age 34)	Crucero del Norte
	Argentina	Facundo Pumpido	CF	21 October 1988 (age 38)	Deportivo Morón
	Uruguay	Max Rauhofer	FW	28 October 1990 (age 36)	Deportivo Maldonado
Out on loan					Loaned to
	Argentina	Lautaro Parisi	FW	22 March 1994 (age 32)	Arsenal de Sarandí

== Transfers ==
Domestic transfer windows:
3 July 2019 to 24 September 2019
20 January 2020 to 19 February 2020.

=== Transfers in ===
Date from	Position	Nationality	Name	From	Ref.
3 July 2019 (Note: Deal agreed on 13 June 2019)	GK	Argentina	Franco Agüero	Sansinena	
3 July 2019 (Note: Deal agreed on 13 June 2019)	LB	Argentina	Kevin Ceceri	Unattached (Note: Previously played for Linense (2018).)	
3 July 2019 (Note: Deal agreed on 13 June 2019)	MF	Argentina	Mateo Ramírez	Gimnasia y Esgrima (M)	
20 July 2019	FW	Argentina	Julián Bonetto	Alvarado	
23 July 2019	FW	Argentina	Abel Méndez	Crucero del Norte	
23 July 2019	RW	Argentina	Rodrigo Depetris	Alvarado	
24 July 2019	CB	Argentina	Diego Herner	Alvarado	
24 July 2019	GK	Argentina	César Taborda	Central Córdoba	
24 July 2019	GK	Argentina	Braian Maya	J.J. Moreno	
10 August 2019	CB	Argentina	Leandro Lugarzo	Almagro	
12 August 2019	CF	Argentina	Facundo Pumpido	Deportivo Morón	
14 August 2019	LM	Argentina	Ezequiel Ávila	Cipolletti	

=== Transfers out ===
Date from	Position	Nationality	Name	To	Ref.
6 June 2019	CB	Argentina	Federico Rasmussen	Atlante	
3 July 2019 (Note: Deal agreed on 10 June 2019)	DF	Argentina	Elvio Gelmini	Defensores de Belgrano	
3 July 2019 (Note: Deal agreed on 27 June 2019)	LM	Argentina	Jorge Velázquez	Barracas Central	
3 July 2019 (Note: Deal agreed on 28 June 2019)	GK	Argentina	Sebastián Giovini	Defensores de Belgrano	
4 July 2019	LM	Argentina	Julián Bartolo	Acassuso	

=== Loans in ===
Start date	Position	Nationality	Name	From	End date	Ref.
4 July 2019	RB	Argentina	Matías Ruíz Díaz	Estudiantes (LP)	30 June 2020	
19 July 2019	CB	Argentina	Mauro Osores	Atlético Tucumán	30 June 2020	
25 July 2019	CM	Argentina	Facundo Soloa	Atlético de Rafaela	30 June 2020	
2 August 2019	AM	Argentina	Mauricio Vera	Estudiantes	30 June 2020	

=== Loans out ===
Start date	Position	Nationality	Name	To	End date	Ref.
3 July 2019 (Note: Deal agreed on 25 June 2019)	FW	Argentina	Lautaro Parisi	Arsenal de Sarandí	30 June 2020	

== Friendlies ==
=== Pre-season ===
Win Draw Loss

24 July 2019 Friendly	Guillermo Brown	0–2	Sol de Mayo	Puerto Madryn, Argentina
15:00 GMT-3		Diario Río Negro; 60 min. match	D. Galván; J. Elordi	Stadium: Estadio Raúl Conti

24 July 2019 Friendly	Guillermo Brown	0–0	Sol de Mayo	Puerto Madryn, Argentina
		Diario Río Negro; 30 min. match		Stadium: Estadio Raúl Conti

30 July 2019 Friendly	Guillermo Brown	3–0	Gaiman	Puerto Madryn, Argentina
15:30 GMT-3	F. Soloa; J. Martínez; J. Bonetto	El Diario de Madryn		Stadium: Villa Deportiva

3 August 2019 Friendly	Chacarita Juniors	2–3	Guillermo Brown	Buenos Aires, Argentina
09:39 GMT-3	M. Casa 39'; L. Cano 43' (pen.)	Chacarita Juniors; Diario Jornada	J. Martínez 3'; E. Moreno 31'; A. Méndez 66'	Stadium: Estadio Chacarita Juniors

3 August 2019 Friendly	Chacarita Juniors	2–1	Guillermo Brown	Buenos Aires, Argentina
	E. Alderete 65', 76'	Chacarita Juniors; Diario Jornada	E. Tourville 89'	Stadium: Estadio Chacarita Juniors

5 August 2019 Friendly	Guillermo Brown	3–0	Temperley	Ezeiza, Argentina
	J. Martínez; A. Méndez	El Chubut; 70 min. match		Stadium: Complejo Deportivo de Ezeiza

5 August 2019 Friendly	Guillermo Brown	0–3	Temperley	Ezeiza, Argentina
		El Chubut	K. Ceceri (o.g.); M. González; N. Messiniti	Stadium: Complejo Deportivo de Ezeiza

7 August 2019 Friendly	Atlanta	2–0	Guillermo Brown	Villa Celina, Argentina
	F. Pedrozo (pen.); W. Mazzantti	Diario Jornada; 80 min. match		Stadium: Predio Antonio Carbone

7 August 2019 Friendly	Atlanta	0–0	Guillermo Brown	Villa Celina, Argentina
		Diario Jornada		Stadium: Predio Antonio Carbone

== Competitions ==
=== Primera B Nacional ===
==== Results summary ====
Overall								Home						Away					
Pld	W	D	L	GF	GA	GD	Pts	W	D	L	GF	GA	GD	W	D	L	GF	GA	GD
3	0	0	3	0	4	−4	0	0	0	2	0	3	−3	0	0	1	0	1	−1

Last updated: 3 September 2019.
Source: Soccerway

==== Matches ====
The fixtures for the 2019–20 league season were announced on 1 August 2019, with a new format of split zones being introduced. Guillermo Brown were drawn in Zone A.

Win Draw Loss

18 August 2019 1	Guillermo Brown	0–2	Barracas Central	Puerto Madryn, Argentina
15:05 GMT-3		Diario Jornada; Soccerway	M. Matos 42'; C. Valenzuela 70'	Stadium: Estadio Raúl Conti; Referee: Diego Ceballos (Argentina)

24 August 2019 2	Deportivo Morón	1–0	Guillermo Brown	Morón, Argentina
15:30 GMT-3	E. Ciaccheri 82'	EL CHUBUT; Soccerway		Stadium: Estadio Nuevo Francisco Urbano; Referee: Andrés Gareano (Argentina)

1 September 2019 3	Guillermo Brown	0–1	Temperley	Puerto Madryn, Argentina
15:00 GMT-3		El Patagónico; Soccerway	E. Baglivo 65'	Stadium: Estadio Raúl Conti; Referee: Fabricio Llobet (Argentina)

8 September 2019 4	Platense	–	Guillermo Brown	Florida Este, Argentina
16:00 GMT-3				Stadium: Estadio Ciudad de Vicente López

== Squad statistics ==
=== Appearances and goals ===
No.	Pos.	Nationality	Name	League		Cup		League Cup		Continental		Other		Total		Discipline		Ref
No.	Pos.	Nationality	Name	Apps	Goals	Apps	Goals	Apps	Goals	Apps	Goals	Apps	Goals	Apps	Goals	Yellow card	Red card	Ref
–	GK	Argentina	Franco Agüero	0	0	—		—		—		0	0	0	0	0	0	
–	GK	Argentina	Mateo Grasso	0	0	—		—		—		0	0	0	0	0	0	
–	GK	Argentina	Gonzalo Laborda	0	0	—		—		—		0	0	0	0	0	0	
–	GK	Argentina	Braian Maya	0	0	—		—		—		0	0	0	0	0	0	
–	GK	Argentina	César Taborda	3	0	—		—		—		0	0	3	0	0	0	
–	DF	Uruguay	Juan Alsina	0	0	—		—		—		0	0	0	0	0	0	
–	RB	Argentina	Mauro Bazán	3	0	—		—		—		0	0	3	0	0	0	
–	LB	Argentina	Kevin Ceceri	0	0	—		—		—		0	0	0	0	0	0	
–	CB	Argentina	Christian Cepeda	0	0	—		—		—		0	0	0	0	0	0	
–	DF	Argentina	Matías Cupayolo	0	0	—		—		—		0	0	0	0	0	0	
–	LB	Argentina	Guillermo Ferracuti	3	0	—		—		—		0	0	3	0	0	0	
–	CB	Argentina	Diego Herner	0	0	—		—		—		0	0	0	0	0	0	
–	CB	Argentina	Leandro Lugarzo	2	0	—		—		—		0	0	2	0	1	0	
–	CB	Argentina	Mauro Osores	1	0	—		—		—		0	0	1	0	0	0	
–	DF	Argentina	Fabrizio Romero	0	0	—		—		—		0	0	0	0	0	0	
–	RB	Argentina	Matías Ruíz Díaz	0(1)	0	—		—		—		0	0	0(1)	0	0	0	
–	CB	Argentina	Luciano Sánchez	3	0	—		—		—		0	0	3	0	1	0	
–	LM	Argentina	Ezequiel Ávila	0	0	—		—		—		0	0	0	0	0	0	
–	DM	Argentina	Lucas Bossio	0	0	—		—		—		0	0	0	0	0	0	
–	MF	Argentina	Elian Coronas	0	0	—		—		—		0	0	0	0	0	0	
–	MF	Argentina	Mauro Cortéz	0	0	—		—		—		0	0	0	0	0	0	
–	RW	Argentina	Rodrigo Depetris	0	0	—		—		—		0	0	0	0	0	0	
–	MF	Argentina	Cristian García	3	0	—		—		—		0	0	3	0	3	0	
–	RM	Argentina	Fabián Monserrat	0	0	—		—		—		0	0	0	0	0	0	
–	LM	Argentina	Emanuel Moreno	2	0	—		—		—		0	0	2	0	0	0	
–	MF	Argentina	Cristian Muga	0	0	—		—		—		0	0	0	0	0	0	
–	MF	Argentina	Mateo Ramírez	1(2)	0	—		—		—		0	0	1(2)	0	0	0	
–	CM	Argentina	Facundo Soloa	3	0	—		—		—		0	0	3	0	2	0	
–	MF	Argentina	Lucas Urdininea	0	0	—		—		—		0	0	0	0	0	0	
–	AM	Argentina	Mauricio Vera	0	0	—		—		—		0	0	0	0	0	0	
–	FW	Argentina	Mateo Acosta	3	0	—		—		—		0	0	3	0	0	0	
–	FW	Argentina	Hernán Altolaguirre	0	0	—		—		—		0	0	0	0	0	0	
–	FW	Argentina	Julián Bonetto	3	0	—		—		—		0	0	3	0	2	0	
–	CF	Argentina	Sergio González	0	0	—		—		—		0	0	0	0	0	0	
–	CF	Argentina	Joel Martínez	3	0	—		—		—		0	0	3	0	0	0	
–	FW	Argentina	Lautaro Parisi	0	0	—		—		—		0	0	0	0	0	0	
–	FW	Argentina	Abel Méndez	0(3)	0	—		—		—		0	0	0(3)	0	0	0	
–	CF	Argentina	Facundo Pumpido	0(2)	0	—		—		—		0	0	0(2)	0	0	0	
–	FW	Uruguay	Max Rauhofer	0	0	—		—		—		0	0	0	0	0	0	
Own goals				—	0	—		—		—		—	0	—	0	—	—	—

Statistics accurate as of 3 September 2019.
