= Matías Cupayolo =

Argentine footballer

Personal information
- Full name: Matías Daniel Cupayolo
- Date of birth: 19 December 1997 (age 28)
- Place of birth: San Rafael, Argentina
- Height: 1.78 m (5 ft 10 in)
- Position: Right-back

Team information
- Current team: CAI

Youth career
- Guillermo Brown

Senior career*
| Years | Team | Apps | (Gls) |
| 2018–2019 | Guillermo Brown | 6 | (0) |
| 2019 | JJ Moreno | | |
| 2020– | CAI | 3 | (0) |
- * Club domestic league appearances and goals as of 13:20, 14 October 2020 (UTC)

Matías Daniel Cupayolo (born 19 December 1997) is an Argentine professional footballer who plays as a right-back for CAI.

== Career ==
Cupayolo began his career with Guillermo Brown. His first taste of senior football came in the Copa Argentina, with Cupayolo being an unused substitute for ties with Deportivo Madryn, CAI and Chacarita Juniors between 2014 and 2017. He made his professional bow in Primera B Nacional on 18 March 2018 during a scoreless draw versus Los Andes. He started a further five matches throughout the 2017–18 campaign. He was released in June 2019, prior to signing for Torneo Patagónico team JJ Moreno. In January 2020, Cupayolo joined CAI in Torneo Regional Federal Amateur.

== Career statistics ==
As of 14 October 2020.

Club statistics
| Club | Season | League | | | Cup | | League Cup | | Continental | | Other | | Total | |
| Club | Season | Division | Apps | Goals | Apps | Goals | Apps | Goals | Apps | Goals | Apps | Goals | Apps | Goals |
|---|---|---|---|---|---|---|---|---|---|---|---|---|---|---|
| Guillermo Brown | 2014 | Torneo Federal A | 0 | 0 | 0 | 0 | — | | — | | 0 | 0 | 0 | 0 |
| Guillermo Brown | 2015 | Primera B Nacional | 0 | 0 | 0 | 0 | — | | — | | 0 | 0 | 0 | 0 |
| Guillermo Brown | 2016 | Primera B Nacional | 0 | 0 | 0 | 0 | — | | — | | 0 | 0 | 0 | 0 |
| Guillermo Brown | 2016–17 | Primera B Nacional | 0 | 0 | 0 | 0 | — | | — | | 0 | 0 | 0 | 0 |
| Guillermo Brown | 2017–18 | Primera B Nacional | 6 | 0 | 0 | 0 | — | | — | | 0 | 0 | 6 | 0 |
| Guillermo Brown | 2018–19 | Primera B Nacional | 0 | 0 | 0 | 0 | — | | — | | 0 | 0 | 0 | 0 |
| Guillermo Brown | Total | | 6 | 0 | 0 | 0 | — | | — | | 0 | 0 | 6 | 0 |
| CAI | 2020 | Torneo Amateur | 3 | 0 | 0 | 0 | — | | — | | 0 | 0 | 3 | 0 |
| Career total | | | 9 | 0 | 0 | 0 | — | | — | | 0 | 0 | 9 | 0 |
