= Jorge Velázquez =

Argentine footballer

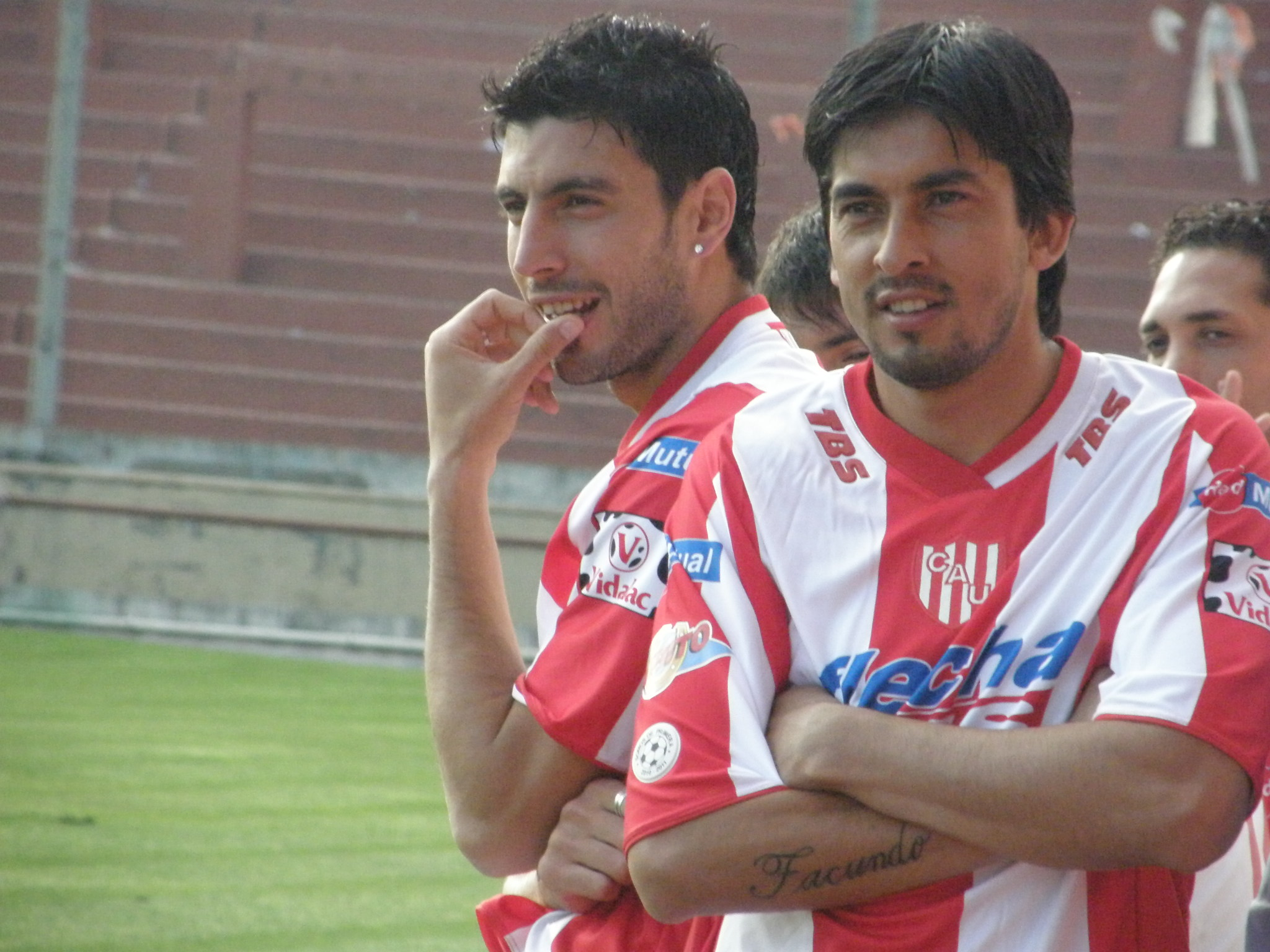
- Jorge Luis Velázquez

Personal information
- Full name: Jorge Luis Velázquez
- Date of birth: 7 September 1982 (age 44)
- Place of birth: Vera, Argentina
- Height: 1.82 m (5 ft 11 1/2 in)
- Position: Midfielder

Youth career
- Huracán de Vera

Senior career*
Years	Team	Apps	(Gls)
2004–2005	Germinal	20	(2)
2005–2008	Guillermo Brown	75	(17)
2008–2010	Aldosivi	64	(7)
2010–2012	Unión Santa Fe	69	(11)
2012–2017	Belgrano	154	(20)
2017–2018	Atlético de Rafaela	23	(4)
2018–2019	Guillermo Brown	24	(0)
2019–2020	Barracas Central	7	(1)
- * Club domestic league appearances and goals as of 23:11, 23 September 2020 (UTC)

Jorge Luis Velázquez (born 7 September 1982) is an Argentine professional footballer who plays as a midfielder.

== Career ==
Velázquez had a youth spell with Huracán de Vera before he got his senior career started in 2004 with a spell in Torneo Argentino B with Germinal, he then moved to Guillermo Brown of Torneo Argentino A a year later. In 2008, Velázquez joined Primera B Nacional team Aldosivi. He made sixty-four appearances and scored seven goals for the club prior to departing in 2010. His next career move was to Unión Santa Fe, also of Primera B Nacional. Eight goals in thirty-three games followed in his debut season as the club won promotion into the 2011–12 Argentine Primera División. In the top-flight, he scored three goals in thirty-six matches.

On 5 July 2012, Velázquez completed a transfer to fellow Primera División side Belgrano. He made his debut for Belgrano in an away win at the Estadio Monumental Antonio Vespucio Liberti against River Plate. In his first five seasons with the team, Velázquez participated in one hundred and thirty-two games and scored nineteen times. On 26 July 2017, Velázquez joined Primera B Nacional team Atlético de Rafaela. He scored a goal on his debut in a Copa Argentina defeat versus Banfield. He made his 400th career appearance on 22 September against Los Andes. Velázquez secured a return to Guillermo Brown in July 2018.

== Career statistics ==
As of 9 September 2018.

Club statistics
Club	Season	League			Cup (Note: Includes the Copa Argentina)		League Cup		Continental (Note: Includes the Copa Sudamericana)		Other		Total	
Club	Season	Division	Apps	Goals	Apps	Goals	Apps	Goals	Apps	Goals	Apps	Goals	Apps	Goals
Germinal	2004–05	Torneo Argentino B	20	2	0	0	—		—		0	0	20	2
Guillermo Brown	2005–06	Torneo Argentino A	36	8	0	0	—		—		0	0	36	8
Guillermo Brown	2006–07	Torneo Argentino A	37	9	0	0	—		—		0	0	37	9
Guillermo Brown	2007–08	Torneo Argentino A	2	0	0	0	—		—		0	0	2	0
Guillermo Brown	Total		75	17	0	0	—		—		0	0	75	17
Aldosivi	2008–09	Primera B Nacional	30	1	0	0	—		—		0	0	30	1
Aldosivi	2009–10	Primera B Nacional	34	6	0	0	—		—		0	0	34	6
Aldosivi	Total		64	7	0	0	—		—		0	0	64	7
Unión Santa Fe	2010–11	Primera B Nacional	33	8	0	0	—		—		0	0	33	8
Unión Santa Fe	2011–12	Primera División	36	3	0	0	—		—		0	0	36	3
Unión Santa Fe	Total		69	11	0	0	—		—		0	0	69	11
Belgrano	2012–13	Primera División	37	5	0	0	—		—		0	0	37	5
Belgrano	2013–14	Primera División	35	4	0	0	—		2 (Note: Two appearances in 2013 Copa Sudamericana)	0	0	0	37	4
Belgrano	2014	Primera División	17	2	1	0	—		—		0	0	18	2
Belgrano	2015	Primera División	27	5	1	0	—		2 (Note: Two appearances in 2015 Copa Sudamericana)	1 (Note: One goal in 2015 Copa Sudamericana)	0	0	30	6
Belgrano	2016	Primera División	16	3	0	0	—		—		0	0	16	3
Belgrano	2016–17	Primera División	22	1	5	1	—		4 (Note: Four appearances in 2016 Copa Sudamericana)	0	0	0	31	2
Belgrano	Total		154	20	7	1	—		8	1	0	0	163	22
Atlético de Rafaela	2017–18	Primera B Nacional	23	4	1	1	—		—		0	0	24	5
Guillermo Brown	2018–19	Primera B Nacional	2	0	0	0	—		—		0	0	2	0
Career total			407	61	8	2	—		8	1	0	0	423	64

== Honours ==
Guillermo Brown

- Torneo Argentino A: 2006–07 Clausura
