= Luciano Sánchez =

Luciano Sánchez may refer to:

- Vavá II, Spanish retired forward
- Luciano Sánchez (footballer, born January 1994), Argentine defender
- Luciano Sánchez (footballer, born September 1994), Argentine defender
