= Cristian Canan =

Argentine professional footballer

Personal information
- Full name: Cristian Adrián Canan
- Date of birth: 3 November 1995 (age 31)
- Place of birth: Hurlingham, Argentina
- Height: 1.72 m (5 ft 8 in)
- Position: Midfielder

Team information
- Current team: Los Andes

Youth career
- Boca Juniors

Senior career*
Years	Team	Apps	(Gls)
2015–2019	Almirante Brown	94	(2)
2019–2021	Almirante Brown	2	(0)
2022–	Los Andes	8	(0)

International career
2016	Argentina U23		
- * Club domestic league appearances and goals as of 17:05, 7 August 2022 (UTC)

Cristian Adrián Canan (born 3 November 1995) is an Argentine professional footballer who plays as a midfielder for Los Andes.

== Club career ==
Canan started in the youth ranks of Boca Juniors, prior to signing with Almirante Brown. He made his professional debut for the Primera B Metropolitana team on 21 August 2015, featuring for sixty-four minutes of a 1–0 victory over Atlanta. He made six appearances in each of his first two seasons, prior to appearing over twenty-five times in each of the following two. In the latter, 2017–18, Canan scored his opening senior goals against Comunicaciones and Tristán Suárez respectively.

In June 2019, Canan departed Almirante Brown with the intention of playing abroad. However, in the succeeding November, he resigned with the club to replace Luis Arias who suffered a knee-ligament injury. In his first match back, a reserve game with JJ Urquiza, Canan picked up a similar serious injury. In February 2022, Canan joined Los Andes.

== International career ==
In 2016, Canan represented Argentina at U23 level in India at the Sait Nagjee Trophy.

== Career statistics ==
As of 7 July 2020.

Appearances and goals by club, season and competition
Club	Season	League			Cup		League Cup		Continental		Other		Total	
Club	Season	Division	Apps	Goals	Apps	Goals	Apps	Goals	Apps	Goals	Apps	Goals	Apps	Goals
Almirante Brown	2015	Primera B Metropolitana	6	0	0	0	—		—		0	0	6	0
Almirante Brown	2016	Primera B Metropolitana	6	0	0	0	—		—		0	0	6	0
Almirante Brown	2016–17	Primera B Metropolitana	31	0	0	0	—		—		0	0	31	0
Almirante Brown	2017–18	Primera B Metropolitana	26	2	0	0	—		—		0	0	26	2
Almirante Brown	2018–19	Primera B Metropolitana	25	0	0	0	—		—		0	0	25	0
Career total			94	2	0	0	—		—		0	0	94	2
