= Luís Arias =

Luís Arias may refer to:

- Luis Arias (alpine skier) (1930–1970), Spanish alpine skier
- Luís Arias (boxer) (born 1990), Cuban-American amateur boxer
- Luis Arias (footballer) (born 1991), Argentine defender
- Luis Carlos Arias (born 1985), Colombian footballer
- Luis Arias Graziani (1926–2020), Peruvian military officer and politician
- Luis Arias (volleyball) (born 1989), Venezuelan volleyball player
