= Emanuel Moreno =

Argentine footballer

Personal information
- Full name: Emanuel Rubén Moreno
- Date of birth: 19 March 1990 (age 36)
- Place of birth: Paraná, Argentina
- Height: 1.82 m (5 ft 11 1/2 in)
- Position: Midfielder

Team information
- Current team: Guillermo Brown

Youth career
- 1995–2006: Argentino Juniors
- 2006–2009: Sarmiento
- 2009–2010: Unión Santa Fe

Senior career*
Years	Team	Apps	(Gls)
2010–2014	Unión Santa Fe	47	(2)
2014–2015	Douglas Haig	37	(2)
2016–2017	Los Andes	52	(2)
2018–2020	Guillermo Brown	54	(5)
2020–2022	Quilmes	57	(4)
2023–2024	Agropecuario	59	(2)
2025–2026	Patronato	18	(0)
2026–	Guillermo Brown	0	(0)
- * Club domestic league appearances and goals as of 21:59, 14 March 2026 (UTC)

Emanuel Rubén Moreno (born 19 March 1990) is an Argentine professional footballer who plays as a midfielder for Torneo Federal A club Guillermo Brown.

== Career ==
Moreno started his career with local club with Argentino Juniors, where he remained for eleven years until he joined for Sarmiento. 2009 saw Unión Santa Fe sign Moreno, with his professional bow arriving in the following year during a 2–2 draw at home to Instituto in Primera B Nacional on 8 May 2010. That sole appearance in 2009–10 was followed by three participations in 2010–11 as they won promotion to the Primera División. They returned to tier two two years later, with Moreno then netting his opening senior goals versus Instituto and Boca Unidos respectively. On 3 July 2014, Moreno joined Douglas Haig. Thirty-nine matches followed.

A further move to Los Andes was completed in January 2016, with Moreno subsequently appearing fifty-two times and scoring twice. Guillermo Brown of Primera B Nacional signed Moreno on 7 January 2018. Twelve games occurred in the rest of 2017–18, with his last one of the campaign being a goalless draw in April against Almagro. He left the club following the expiration of his contract on 30 June 2020. In August 2020, Moreno signed with Quilmes until the end of 2022.

== Career statistics ==
As of 11 July 2020.

Club statistics
Club	Season	League			Cup		Continental		Other		Total	
Club	Season	Division	Apps	Goals	Apps	Goals	Apps	Goals	Apps	Goals	Apps	Goals
Unión Santa Fe	2009–10	Primera B Nacional	1	0	0	0	—		0	0	1	0
Unión Santa Fe	2010–11	Primera B Nacional	3	0	0	0	—		0	0	3	0
Unión Santa Fe	2011–12	Primera División	3	0	1	0	—		0	0	4	0
Unión Santa Fe	2012–13	Primera División	14	0	1	0	—		0	0	15	0
Unión Santa Fe	2013–14	Primera B Nacional	26	2	1	0	—		0	0	27	2
Unión Santa Fe	Total		47	2	3	0	—		0	0	50	2
Douglas Haig	2014	Primera B Nacional	17	0	1	0	—		0	0	18	0
Douglas Haig	2015	Primera B Nacional	20	2	1	0	—		0	0	21	2
Douglas Haig	Total		37	2	2	0	—		0	0	39	2
Los Andes	2016	Primera B Nacional	18	1	0	0	—		0	0	18	1
Los Andes	2016–17	Primera B Nacional	34	1	0	0	—		0	0	34	1
Los Andes	Total		52	2	0	0	—		0	0	52	2
Guillermo Brown	2017–18	Primera B Nacional	12	1	0	0	—		0	0	12	1
Guillermo Brown	2018–19	Primera B Nacional	22	0	1	0	—		0	0	23	0
Guillermo Brown	2019–20	Primera B Nacional	20	4	0	0	—		0	0	20	4
Guillermo Brown	Total		54	5	1	0	—		0	0	55	5
Career total			190	11	6	0	—		0	0	196	11
