= Martín Rolle =

Argentine footballer

Personal information
- Full name: Diego Martín Rolle
- Date of birth: 2 February 1985 (age 41)
- Place of birth: La Plata, Buenos Aires, Argentina
- Height: 1.66 m (5 ft 5 1/2 in)
- Position: Attacking midfielder

Team information
- Current team: Guillermo Brown

Youth career
- 2001–2003: Guillermo Brown

Senior career*
Years	Team	Apps	(Gls)
2003–2009	C.A.I.	85	(6)
2009–2012	Olimpo	108	(25)
2012–2015	San Lorenzo	14	(0)
2012–2014	→ Arsenal de Sarandí (loan)	49	(5)
2014–2015	→ Asteras Tripolis (loan)	31	(4)
2016	Unión de Santa Fe	26	(0)
2017	O'Higgins	25	(3)
2017–2018	Kerkyra	13	(1)
2018–2019	Asteras Tripolis	13	(0)
2019–2020	Gozzano	23	(1)
2020–2021	Ionikos	27	(5)
2021–	Guillermo Brown	30	(2)
- * Club domestic league appearances and goals as of 20:33, 24 July 2022 (UTC)

Diego Martín Rolle (born 2 February 1985) is an Argentine professional footballer who plays as an attacking midfielder for Guillermo Brown.

On 16 July 2019, he joined the Italian Serie C club Gozzano.

On 18 August 2020, he joined theGreek Super League 2 club Ionikos.
