= Mateo Acosta =

Argentine footballer (born 1992)

Personal information
- Full name: Mateo Agustín Acosta
- Date of birth: 22 September 1992 (age 34)
- Place of birth: Buenos Aires, Argentina
- Height: 1.90 m (6 ft 3 in)
- Position: Forward

Team information
- Current team: Ferro Carril Oeste

Senior career*
Years	Team	Apps	(Gls)
2013–2014	Tiro Federal Morteros	24	(13)
2014	Libertad de Sunchales	10	(5)
2015	Juventud Unida	23	(0)
2016	Guillermo Brown	14	(3)
2016	Alianza Petrolera	10	(0)
2017	Almagro	12	(1)
2017–2019	Guillermo Brown	35	(7)
2018–2019	→ Gimnasia de Mendoza (loan)	16	(0)
2020	Deportivo Madryn	7	(1)
2020–2022	Brown de Adrogué	57	(16)
2023	Huachipato	10	(2)
2023–2024	San Martín Tucumán	15	(2)
2024–2026	Estudiantes BA	47	(18)
2026–	Ferro Carril Oeste	6	(0)
- * Club domestic league appearances and goals as of 18:36, 11 April 2026 (UTC)

Mateo Agustín Acosta (born 22 September 1992) is an Argentine professional footballer who plays for Ferro Carril Oeste.

== Career ==
Acosta's career got underway with a 2013–14 spell with Tiro Federal in Torneo Argentino B, where the forward netted thirteen goals in twenty-four matches. Libertad of Torneo Federal A signed him in June 2014, prior to Acosta completing a move to professional football with Juventud Unida on 3 January 2015. His first appearance came against Douglas Haig, with his second match ending with an eighty-ninth minute red card versus Estudiantes. Acosta switched to Guillermo Brown for the 2016 Primera B Nacional, a competition in which he scored in fixtures with Boca Unidos, Los Andes and Gimnasia y Esgrima (J) as they finished in eighth place.

On 7 July 2016, Acosta was signed by Colombia's Alianza Petrolera. He made ten appearances for the Categoría Primera A club, five of which were starts with his final game being an away victory versus Rionegro Águilas on 29 October. In the succeeding February, having terminated his contract in December 2016, Acosta returned to Argentina with Almagro in Primera B Nacional. One goal in thirteen fixtures followed. Guillermo Brown resigned Acosta in August 2017. He bettered his previous season with the club, netting five times across twenty-four matches in 2017–18. July 2018 saw Acosta join Gimnasia y Esgrima on loan.

January 2020 saw Acosta join Deportivo Madryn in Torneo Federal A. His first goal arrived in a win over Deportivo Maipú on 9 February, having made his debut against Atlético Camioneros weeks prior. A move back to the second tier was completed in August as he agreed terms with Brown.

In the second half of 2023, Acosta joined San Martín de Tucumán from Chilean club Huachipato.

== Personal life ==
His father was Gustavo Jorge Acosta, "Cepillo", a professional football player identified with Ferro Carril Oeste, but also played in Germany, Spain, Switzerland and Colombia.

== Career statistics ==
As of 12 October 2020.

Club statistics
Club	Season	League			Cup		Continental		Other		Total	
Club	Season	Division	Apps	Goals	Apps	Goals	Apps	Goals	Apps	Goals	Apps	Goals
Tiro Federal	2013–14	Torneo Argentino B	24	13	0	0	—		0	0	24	13
Libertad	2014	Torneo Federal A	10	5	0	0	—		2 (Note: Appearance(s) in the Torneo Federal A play-offs)	0	12	5
Juventud Unida	2015	Primera B Nacional	23	0	0	0	—		0	0	23	0
Guillermo Brown	2016	Primera B Nacional	14	3	0	0	—		0	0	14	3
Alianza Petrolera	2016	Categoría Primera A	10	0	0	0	—		0	0	10	0
Almagro	2016–17	Primera B Nacional	12	1	1	0	—		0	0	13	1
Guillermo Brown	2017–18	Primera B Nacional	23	5	1	0	—		0	0	24	5
Guillermo Brown	2018–19	Primera B Nacional	0	0	0	0	—		0	0	0	0
Guillermo Brown	2019–20	Primera B Nacional	12	2	0	0	—		0	0	12	2
Guillermo Brown	Total		35	7	1	0	—		0	0	36	7
Gimnasia y Esgrima (loan)	2018–19	Primera B Nacional	16	0	1	0	—		0	0	17	0
Deportivo Madryn	2019–20	Torneo Federal A	7	1	2	0	—		0	0	9	1
Brown	2020–21	Primera B Nacional	0	0	0	0	—		0	0	0	0
Career total			151	30	5	0	—		2	0	158	30
