= Christian Cepeda =

Argentine professional footballer

Personal information
- Full name: Christian Enrique Cepeda
- Date of birth: 5 February 1991 (age 35)
- Place of birth: Posadas, Argentina
- Height: 1.84 m (6 ft 1/2 in)
- Position: Defender

Team information
- Current team: Deportes Recoleta

Youth career
- Progreso Rowing
- 2006–2011: Arsenal de Sarandí

Senior career*
Years	Team	Apps	(Gls)
2011–2013	Arsenal de Sarandí	0	(0)
2012–2013	→ Deportivo Merlo (loan)	16	(0)
2013–2014	Once Tigres	25	(2)
2014–2018	UAI Urquiza	123	(4)
2018–2019	Guillermo Brown	19	(2)
2019-2020	Ferro General Pico	4	(0)
2020–2021	Los Andes	32	(1)
2022	Cumbayá	15	(2)
2022	Royal Pari	11	(1)
2023	Unión San Felipe	28	(1)
2024–	Deportes Recoleta	0	(0)
- * Club domestic league appearances and goals as of 26 December 2023

Christian Enrique Cepeda (born 5 February 1991) is an Argentine professional footballer who plays as a defender for Chilean club Deportes Recoleta .

== Career ==
=== Club ===
Cepeda had youth stints with Club Progreso Rowing and Arsenal de Sarandí. He failed to appear in Arsenal's first-team, though was an unused substitute in August 2011 for a Primera División fixture with Atlético de Rafaela. July 2012 saw Cepeda join Deportivo Merlo of Primera B Nacional on loan. Sixteen appearances followed as they were relegated to Primera B Metropolitana. Cepeda subsequently moved Torneo Argentino B on 30 June 2013 by agreeing to sign for Once Tigres. In June 2014, Cepeda joined UAI Urquiza. He remained for five seasons, featuring in one hundred and twenty-nine games whilst netting four.

Primera B Nacional side Guillermo Brown became Cepeda's fifth career club in 2018. He scored goals against Atlético de Rafaela and Villa Dálmine in his opening eleven fixtures for them.

For the 2024 season, he joined Deportes Recoleta from Unión San Felipe in the Primera B de Chile.

=== International ===
Whilst with Arsenal de Sarandí, Cepeda received a call-up to the Argentina U20s.

== Career statistics ==
As of 20 January 2019.

Club statistics
Club	Season	League			Cup		Continental		Other		Total	
Club	Season	Division	Apps	Goals	Apps	Goals	Apps	Goals	Apps	Goals	Apps	Goals
Arsenal de Sarandí	2010–11	Primera División	0	0	0	0	—		0	0	0	0
Arsenal de Sarandí	2011–12	Primera División	0	0	0	0	0	0	0	0	0	0
Arsenal de Sarandí	2012–13	Primera División	0	0	0	0	0	0	0	0	0	0
Arsenal de Sarandí	Total		0	0	0	0	0	0	0	0	0	0
Deportivo Merlo (loan)	2012–13	Primera B Nacional	16	0	0	0	—		0	0	16	0
Once Tigres	2013–14	Torneo Argentino B	25	2	0	0	—		0	0	25	2
UAI Urquiza	2014	Primera B Metropolitana	15	0	0	0	—		0	0	15	0
UAI Urquiza	2015	Primera B Metropolitana	33	1	1	0	—		0	0	34	1
UAI Urquiza	2016	Primera B Metropolitana	17	0	0	0	—		0	0	17	0
UAI Urquiza	2016–17	Primera B Metropolitana	34	3	0	0	—		0	0	34	3
UAI Urquiza	2017–18	Primera B Metropolitana	24	0	0	0	—		5 (Note: Appearance(s) in the Primera B Metropolitana play-offs)	0	29	0
UAI Urquiza	Total		123	4	1	0	—		5	0	129	4
Guillermo Brown	2018–19	Primera B Nacional	12	2	1	0	—		0	0	13	2
Career total			176	8	2	0	0	0	5	0	183	8
