= Kevin Ceceri =

Argentine professional footballer

Personal information
- Full name: Kevin Alejandro Ceceri
- Date of birth: 2 February 1996 (age 30)
- Place of birth: Olavarría, Argentina
- Height: 1.83 m (6 ft 0 in)
- Position: Left-back

Team information
- Current team: San Miguel

Youth career
- Gimnasia LP

Senior career*
Years	Team	Apps	(Gls)
2016–2018	Gimnasia LP	6	(0)
2018	Linense	0	(0)
2019	Guillermo Brown	0	(0)
2020	San José	11	(0)
2020	Al-Hussein		
2021	Desamparados	4	(0)
2022–2023	Unión San Felipe	9	(0)
2023	San Telmo	18	(0)
2023–2024	Steaua București	9	(1)
2024	Pacific FC	11	(0)
2025–2026	GV San José	14	(0)
2026–	San Miguel	11	(1)
- * Club domestic league appearances and goals as of 17:51, 5 May 2026 (UTC)

Kevin Alejandro Ceceri (born 2 February 1996) is an Argentine professional footballer who plays as a left-back for San Miguel.

== Career ==
Ceceri started his Gimnasia y Esgrima senior career in 2016, making his professional debut in the Argentine Primera División on 10 April during a defeat to Belgrano. That was one of four appearances for Ceceri with Gimnasia y Esgrima in 2016, prior to two more during 2016–17. On 4 July 2018, Ceceri completed a move to Segunda División B side Linense of Spain. Despite regularly featuring in pre-season friendlies, notably against the likes of Cádiz, Córdoba and Mallorca, the defender didn't appear in competitive action; he was an unused substitute for a fixture with UCAM Murcia on 26 August, but his contract was terminated soon after.

In June 2019, after a number of months without a club, Ceceri returned to Argentine football with Guillermo Brown of Primera B Nacional. In January 2020, Ceceri signed with Bolivian club Club San José. He made 11 appearances for the club before the league was suspended due to the COVID-19 pandemic. In October 2020 it was confirmed, that Ceceri had joined Jordanian club Al-Hussein. He made his debut for the club on 19 November 2020. At the end of March 2021, Ceceri returned to his homeland, after signing with Sportivo Desamparados. In January 2022, he joined Unión San Felipe.

== Career statistics ==
As of 21 June 2019.

Club statistics
Club	Season	League			Cup		League Cup		Continental		Other		Total	
Club	Season	Division	Apps	Goals	Apps	Goals	Apps	Goals	Apps	Goals	Apps	Goals	Apps	Goals
Gimnasia y Esgrima	2016	Primera División	4	0	1	0	—		—		0	0	5	0
Gimnasia y Esgrima	2016–17	Primera División	2	0	0	0	—		0	0	0	0	2	0
Gimnasia y Esgrima	2017–18	Primera División	0	0	0	0	—		—		0	0	0	0
Gimnasia y Esgrima	Total		6	0	1	0	—		0	0	0	0	7	0
Linense	2018–19	Segunda División B	0	0	0	0	0	0	—		0	0	0	0
Guillermo Brown	2019–10	Primera B Nacional	0	0	0	0	—		—		0	0	0	0
Career total			6	0	1	0	0	0	0	0	0	0	7	0
