= Facundo Pumpido =

Argentine footballer

Personal information
- Full name: Facundo Pumpido
- Date of birth: 21 October 1988 (age 38)
- Place of birth: Olivos, Argentina
- Height: 1.85 m (6 ft 1 in)
- Position: Forward

Team information
- Current team: Temperley

Senior career*
Years	Team	Apps	(Gls)
2008–2009	Tigre	1	(0)
2009–2010	Independiente Rivadavia	6	(1)
2011	Huracán Tres Arroyos	?	(4)
2012–2016	Acassuso	86	(18)
2015	→ San Martín San Juan (loan)	14	(3)
2016	→ Racing Santander (loan)	15	(3)
2016–2017	Nueva Chicago	24	(4)
2017–2018	Brown de Adrogué	9	(3)
2018–2019	Deportivo Morón	25	(4)
2019–2020	Guillermo Brown	16	(1)
2020–2021	Comunicaciones	4	(2)
2021–	Temperley	35	(5)
- * Club domestic league appearances and goals as of 19:53, 24 July 2022 (UTC)

Facundo Pumpido (born 21 October 1988) is an Argentinian footballer who plays for Temperley as a forward.

== Club career ==
Born in Olivos, Buenos Aires, Pumpido did not appear for any youth setups due to his studying responsibilities. His first senior club was Tigre, in Primera División.

Pumpido made his professional debut on 16 May 2009, coming on as a late substitute for Carlos Luna in a 2–1 home win against Colón; it was his maiden appearance for the club. He subsequently moved to Primera B Nacional side Independiente Rivadavia, scoring his first professional goal while at the club.

In 2011 Pumpido joined Huracán de Tres Arroyos in Torneo Argentino A, after being rarely used. On 5 January of the following year he agreed to a contract at Acassuso in Primera B Metropolitana, being a regular starter during his time at the club.

On 24 January 2015 Pumpido was loaned to San Martín de San Juan in the top tier, for one year. On 7 January of the following year he moved abroad for the first time in his career, after agreeing to a six-month deal with Spanish Segunda División B side Racing de Santander.

== Personal life ==
Pumpido's uncle, Nery was also a footballer: a goalkeeper, he was an international with Argentina on more than 30 occasions, having been world champion with the Albiceleste in 1986.
