= Mateo Grasso =

Argentine professional footballer

Personal information
- Full name: Mateo Emiliano Grasso
- Date of birth: 6 December 1995 (age 30)
- Place of birth: Córdoba, Argentina
- Height: 1.87 m (6 ft 2 in)
- Position: Goalkeeper

Team information
- Current team: College 1975
- Number: 13

Youth career
- Talleres
- Newell's Old Boys
- Boca Juniors
- Ferro Carril Oeste

Senior career*
| Years | Team | Apps | (Gls) |
| 2016–2018 | CAI | 28 | (0) |
| 2018 | → Mons Calpe (loan) | 16 | (0) |
| 2018–2019 | Guillermo Brown | 1 | (0) |
| 2019–2023 | CAI | 4 | (0) |
| 2023– | College 1975 | 17 | (0) |
- * Club domestic league appearances and goals as of 13:02, 13 April 2024 (UTC)

Mateo Emiliano Grasso (born 6 December 1995) is an Argentine professional footballer who plays as a goalkeeper for College 1975.

== Career ==
Grasso passed through the youth academies of Talleres, Newell's Old Boys, Boca Juniors and Ferro Carril Oeste. He began his senior career with CAI, as the goalkeeper played twenty-eight times between 2016 and 2017 in Torneo Federal B. In January 2018, Grasso joined Gibraltar Premier Division side Mons Calpe on loan. Grasso, who is of Italian descent, returned to Argentina with Guillermo Brown of Primera B Nacional seven months later. After going unused on the bench five times in 2018–19, he made his debut on 21 April 2019 during a 3–1 loss away to Sarmiento. He left the club in June 2019.

A return to CAI, of Torneo Regional Federal Amateur, was completed in late-2019.

== Career statistics ==
As of 12 October 2020.

Appearances and goals by club, season and competition
| Club | Season | League | | | Cup | | League Cup | | Continental | | Other | | Total | |
| Club | Season | Division | Apps | Goals | Apps | Goals | Apps | Goals | Apps | Goals | Apps | Goals | Apps | Goals |
|---|---|---|---|---|---|---|---|---|---|---|---|---|---|---|
| Guillermo Brown | 2018–19 | Primera B Nacional | 1 | 0 | 0 | 0 | — | | — | | 0 | 0 | 1 | 0 |
| CAI | 2020 | Torneo Amateur | 4 | 0 | 0 | 0 | — | | — | | 0 | 0 | 4 | 0 |
| Career total | | | 5 | 0 | 0 | 0 | — | | — | | 0 | 0 | 5 | 0 |
