= Juan Alsina =

Uruguayan footballer (born 1989)

Personal information
- Full name: Juan Ramón Alsina Klingler
- Date of birth: 15 November 1989 (age 36)
- Place of birth: Montevideo, Uruguay
- Height: 1.88 m (6 ft 2 in)
- Position: Centre-back

Senior career*
Years	Team	Apps	(Gls)
2007–2010	Huracán Buceo	12	(0)
2010–2018	Sud América	89	(2)
2016–2017	→ Villa Dálmine (loan)	56	(0)
2018	Liverpool	6	(0)
2018–2019	Guillermo Brown	18	(1)
2019	Borneo	17	(1)
2020–2021	Alvarado	38	(0)

International career
- Uruguay U20
- * Club domestic league appearances and goals as of 17:59, 14 June 2022 (UTC)

Juan Ramón Alsina Klingler (born 15 November 1989) is a Uruguayan professional footballer who plays as a centre-back.

== Club career ==
Alsina began his career in his homeland with Huracán Buceo, making twelve appearances in three years from 2007; initially in the Segunda División, before relegation in the 2008–09 campaign. In 2010, Sud América completed the signing of Alsina. After three seasons in the second tier, they won promotion to the Primera División as champions in 2012–13. His first top-flight match arrived on 30 November 2013 during a 1–1 draw versus Defensor Sporting. Thirty appearances later, in January 2016, Alsina moved to Primera B Nacional on loan with Villa Dálmine. His stint lasted the 2016 and 2016–17 seasons, appearing fifty-seven times.

Having gone back to Sud América, he appeared for the club for the rest of the 2017 Primera División season as they suffered relegation to the Segunda División. Top tier Liverpool subsequently signed Alsina, with the defender participating in the first of six fixtures in February versus Cerro. On 8 August 2018, Alsina returned to Argentina by agreeing a move to Guillermo Brown. He made his debut in a loss to Brown on 26 August. Alsina scored his first goal for them on 31 March 2019 against Deportivo Morón. After eighteen games for Guillermo Brown, Alsina headed off to Indonesia in August 2019 to join Liga 1 side Borneo.

During his time in Asia, Alsina scored one goal (versus Persija) in seventeen league matches for Borneo. In early 2020, Alsina returned to Argentina with Alvarado.

== International career ==
Alsina represented Uruguay at U20 level, including in a friendly against Mexico on 15 May 2008.

== Career statistics ==
As of 17 September 2020.

Club statistics
Club	Season	League			Cup		League Cup		Continental		Other		Total	
Club	Season	Division	Apps	Goals	Apps	Goals	Apps	Goals	Apps	Goals	Apps	Goals	Apps	Goals
Sud América	2013–14	Primera División	10	0	—		—		—		0	0	10	0
Sud América	2014–15	Primera División	12	0	—		—		—		0	0	12	0
Sud América	2015–16	Primera División	9	0	—		—		—		0	0	9	0
Sud América	2016	Primera División	0	0	—		—		—		0	0	0	0
Sud América	2017	Primera División	14	0	—		—		—		3 (Note: Appearance(s) in the Primera División play-offs)	0	17	0
Sud América	Total		45	0	—		—		—		3	0	48	0
Villa Dálmine (loan)	2016	Primera B Nacional	17	0	0	0	—		—		0	0	17	0
Villa Dálmine (loan)	2016–17	Primera B Nacional	39	0	1	0	—		—		0	0	40	0
Villa Dálmine (loan)	Total		56	0	1	0	—		—		0	0	57	0
Liverpool	2018	Primera División	6	0	—		—		—		0	0	6	0
Guillermo Brown	2018–19	Primera B Nacional	18	1	0	0	—		—		0	0	18	1
Borneo	2019	Liga 1	17	1	0	0	—		—		0	0	17	1
Alvarado	2019–20	Primera B Nacional	6	0	0	0	—		—		0	0	6	0
Career total			148	2	1	0	—		—		3	0	152	2

== Honours ==
Sud América

- Segunda División: 2012–13
