= Facundo Soloa =

Argentine footballer

Personal information
- Date of birth: 4 November 1996 (age 30)
- Place of birth: La Colonia, Argentina
- Height: 1.75 m (5 ft 9 in)
- Position: Midfielder

Team information
- Current team: Atlético de Rafaela

Youth career
- Atlético de Rafaela

Senior career*
Years	Team	Apps	(Gls)
2016–	Atlético de Rafaela	151	(2)
2019–2020	→ Guillermo Brown (loan)	20	(0)
2024–2025	→ A.E. Kifisia (loan)	20	(0)
- * Club domestic league appearances and goals as of 18:19, 27 March 2026 (UTC)

Facundo Soloa (born 4 November 1996) is an Argentine professional footballer who plays as a midfielder for Atlético de Rafaela.
