= Gonzalo Laborda =

Argentine footballer

Personal information
- Full name: Jorge Gonzalo Laborda
- Date of birth: 13 January 1995 (age 31)
- Place of birth: Saladillo, Argentina
- Height: 1.94 m (6 ft 4 in)
- Position: Goalkeeper

Team information
- Current team: Racing de Córdoba

Youth career
- 2008–2013: Independiente
- 2013–2015: Banfield
- 2015–2016: Sarmiento
- 2016–2017: Guillermo Brown

Senior career*
Years	Team	Apps	(Gls)
2017–2019	Guillermo Brown	3	(0)
2020	Bangor City	8	(0)
2020–2021	Sambenedettese	2	(0)
2021–2022	Atletico Racale		(0)
2023–2024	Germinal	38	(0)
2025-	Ciudad Bolívar	21	(0)
2026-	→ Racing de Córdoba (loan)		(0)
- * Club domestic league appearances and goals as of 06 Jan 2026

Jorge Gonzalo Laborda (born 13 January 1995) is an Argentine professional footballer who plays as a goalkeeper for Racing de Córdoba in the Primera Nacional of Argentina on loan from Ciudad Bolívar.

== Career ==
Laborda began his youth career with Independiente at the age of thirteen, which preceded further stints with Banfield and Sarmiento. Guillermo Brown signed the goalkeeper on 31 July 2016. He was an unused substitute for fixtures with Douglas Haig, Villa Dálmine and Atlético Paraná in mid-June 2017, prior to making his professional bow on 24 June versus Brown after coming on at the interval for Andrés Mehring. Another appearance followed a month later against Boca Unidos as they placed third; missing promotion by two points. In January 2020, Laborda headed to Wales to sign with Cymru North side Bangor City.

In August 2020, after eight months with Bangor, Laborda left to sign terms with Sambenedettese of Italy's Serie C. After appearing as an unused substitute for twenty-five matches in all competitions across the next six months, Laborda eventually made his debut for Samb in Serie C on 21 February by playing the full duration of a 4–1 away loss against Modena. He featured again a week later in a 4–0 defeat at home to Südtirol; he replaced Tommaso Nobile, who had been sent off at 0–0.

For the 2026 season, he became a player for Racing de Córdoba, on loan from Ciudad Bolívar.

== Career statistics ==
As of 27 February 2021.

Club statistics
Club	Season	League			Cup		Continental		Other		Total	
Club	Season	Division	Apps	Goals	Apps	Goals	Apps	Goals	Apps	Goals	Apps	Goals
Guillermo Brown	2016–17	Primera B Nacional	2	0	0	0	—		0	0	2	0
Guillermo Brown	2017–18	Primera B Nacional	0	0	0	0	—		0	0	0	0
Guillermo Brown	2018–19	Primera B Nacional	0	0	0	0	—		0	0	0	0
Guillermo Brown	Total		2	0	0	0	—		0	0	2	0
Sambenedettese	2020–21	Serie C	2	0	0	0	—		0	0	2	0
Career total			4	0	0	0	—		0	0	4	0

== Honours ==
Ciudad Bolívar

- Torneo Federal A : 2025
