= Mateo Ramírez =

Argentine footballer (born 1995)

Personal information
- Full name: Mateo Ramírez Montenegro
- Date of birth: 18 January 1995 (age 31)
- Place of birth: Pilar, Argentina
- Height: 1.86 m (6 ft 1 in)
- Position: Midfielder

Team information
- Current team: Colegiales

Youth career
- Vélez Sarsfield

Senior career*
| Years | Team | Apps | (Gls) |
| 2016–2017 | Boca Unidos | 27 | (0) |
| 2017–2019 | Gimnasia Mendoza | 19 | (2) |
| 2019 | Guillermo Brown | 11 | (0) |
| 2020 | Fénix de Pilar | 7 | (0) |
| 2020–2022 | JJ Urquiza | 34 | (3) |
| 2022–2023 | Los Andes | 26 | (0) |
| 2023–2024 | Deportivo Merlo | 24 | (2) |
| 2024–2025 | Carlos Stein | 8 | (1) |
| 2025–2026 | Deportivo Riestra | 13 | (0) |
| 2026– | Colegiales | 6 | (0) |
- * Club domestic league appearances and goals as of 16:56, 4 October 2026 (UTC)

Mateo Ramírez Montenegro (born 18 January 1995) is an Argentine professional footballer who plays as a midfielder for Colegiales.

== Career ==
Ramírez had a stint in the youth system of Vélez Sarsfield. Primera B Nacional's Boca Unidos signed Ramírez ahead of the 2016 campaign. Having been an unused substitute for a match with Brown, the midfielder played the second half of a home defeat to Guillermo Brown on 28 February 2016. His first start came in 2016–17 versus All Boys, which preceded a total of twenty-five appearances that campaign. On 23 August 2017, Ramírez joined Gimnasia y Esgrima of Torneo Federal A. He netted against Deportivo Maipú and Juventud Unida Universitario in season one, on the way to promotion to the tier two for 2018–19.

== Career statistics ==
As of 15 April 2019.

Appearances and goals by club, season and competition
| Club | Season | League | | | Cup | | Continental | | Other | | Total | |
| Club | Season | Division | Apps | Goals | Apps | Goals | Apps | Goals | Apps | Goals | Apps | Goals |
|---|---|---|---|---|---|---|---|---|---|---|---|---|
| Boca Unidos | 2016 | Primera B Nacional | 2 | 0 | 0 | 0 | — | | 0 | 0 | 2 | 0 |
| Boca Unidos | 2016–17 | Primera B Nacional | 25 | 0 | 0 | 0 | — | | 0 | 0 | 25 | 0 |
| Boca Unidos | Total | | 27 | 0 | 0 | 0 | — | | 0 | 0 | 27 | 0 |
| Gimnasia y Esgrima | 2017–18 | Torneo Federal A | 18 | 2 | 4 | 1 | — | | 1 (Note: Appearance(s) in the Torneo Federal A play-offs) | 0 | 23 | 3 |
| Gimnasia y Esgrima | 2018–19 | Primera B Nacional | 1 | 0 | 0 | 0 | — | | 0 | 0 | 1 | 0 |
| Gimnasia y Esgrima | Total | | 19 | 2 | 4 | 1 | — | | 1 | 0 | 24 | 3 |
| Career total | | | 46 | 2 | 4 | 1 | — | | 1 | 0 | 51 | 3 |
