= Guillermo Ferracuti =

Argentine professional footballer

Personal information
- Full name: Guillermo Ferracuti
- Date of birth: 11 February 1991 (age 35)
- Place of birth: Soldini, Argentina
- Height: 1.79 m (5 ft 10 1/2 in)
- Positions: Left-back; centre-back

Team information
- Current team: Nueva Chicago

Youth career
- 2005–2011: Newell's Old Boys

Senior career*
Years	Team	Apps	(Gls)
2011–2014	Newell's Old Boys	16	(0)
2013–2014	→ Patronato (loan)	10	(0)
2014–2015	Colón	7	(0)
2016–2017	Sarmiento	14	(0)
2017–2021	Guillermo Brown	71	(1)
2022–2024	Deportivo Maipú	69	(0)
2024–2025	San Martín Tucumán	22	(0)
2025–2026	Atlanta	32	(0)
2026–	Nueva Chicago	6	(0)
- * Club domestic league appearances and goals as of 17:03, 13 April 2026 (UTC)

Guillermo Ferracuti (born 11 February 1991) is an Argentine professional footballer who plays as a left-back or centre-back for Nueva Chicago.

== Career ==
Ferracuti started in Newell's Old Boys' ranks in 2005. He was promoted into their senior squad at the back end of the 2010–11 Primera División season, starting matches against San Lorenzo, Olimpo and Colón as they secured a seventh-place finish overall. Fifteen appearances followed up until July 2013, when the defender left on loan to Patronato in Primera B Nacional. He was selected eleven times by them. Ferracuti stayed in the second tier for the 2014 season, after departing Newell's Old Boys permanently to sign with Colón. The club won promotion to the Primera División in his first campaign; though just two matches followed for him.

Ahead of January 2016, Ferracuti joined Sarmiento. He made his bow on 13 February during an encounter with San Lorenzo, which was one of fifteen matches he played in for Sarmiento across two seasons; the last, 2016–17, concluded with relegation from the top-flight. On 15 August 2017, Guillermo Brown signed Ferracuti. In January 2022, Ferracuti joined Deportivo Maipú.

== Career statistics ==
As of 20 January 2019.

Club statistics
Club	Season	League			Cup		Continental		Other		Total	
Club	Season	Division	Apps	Goals	Apps	Goals	Apps	Goals	Apps	Goals	Apps	Goals
Newell's Old Boys	2010–11	Primera División	3	0	0	0	0	0	0	0	3	0
Newell's Old Boys	2011–12	Primera División	12	0	1	0	—		0	0	13	0
Newell's Old Boys	2012–13	Primera División	1	0	1	0	0	0	0	0	2	0
Newell's Old Boys	2013–14	Primera División	0	0	0	0	0	0	0	0	0	0
Newell's Old Boys	Total		16	0	2	0	0	0	0	0	18	0
Patronato (loan)	2013–14	Primera B Nacional	10	0	1	0	—		0	0	11	0
Colón	2014	Primera B Nacional	5	0	1	0	—		0	0	6	0
Colón	2015	Primera División	2	0	0	0	—		0	0	2	0
Colón	Total		7	0	1	0	—		0	0	8	0
Sarmiento	2016	Primera División	6	0	0	0	—		0	0	6	0
Sarmiento	2016–17	Primera División	8	0	1	0	—		0	0	9	0
Sarmiento	Total		14	0	1	0	—		0	0	15	0
Guillermo Brown	2017–18	Primera B Nacional	19	0	1	0	—		0	0	20	0
Guillermo Brown	2018–19	Primera B Nacional	3	0	1	0	—		0	0	4	0
Guillermo Brown	Total		22	0	2	0	—		0	0	24	0
Career total			69	0	7	0	0	0	0	0	76	0

== Honours ==
Newell's Old Boys

- Primera División: 2012–13 Torneo Final
