= Alan Espeche =

Argentine professional footballer

Personal information
- Full name: Alan Joaquín Espeche
- Date of birth: 4 September 1999 (age 27)
- Place of birth: Pilar, Argentina
- Height: 1.69 m (5 ft 7 in)
- Position: Midfielder

Team information
- Current team: Los Andes (on loan from All Boys)

Youth career
- All Boys

Senior career*
Years	Team	Apps	(Gls)
2018–	All Boys	59	(2)
2022–	→ Los Andes (loan)	8	(1)
- * Club domestic league appearances and goals as of 14:59, 6 June 2022 (UTC)

Alan Joaquín Espeche (born 4 September 1999) is an Argentine professional footballer who plays as a midfielder for Los Andes, on loan from All Boys.

== Career ==
Espeche began his career with All Boys. He was selected for his professional debut on 14 April 2018, with the midfielder starting a goalless draw at home to Gimnasia y Esgrima in the 2017–18 Primera B Nacional; which concluded with relegation. Espeche scored for the first time in Primera B Metropolitana, netting the sole goal in a win away to Deportivo Riestra on 8 April 2019. In January 2022, Espeche joined Los Andes on a one-year loan deal with a purchase option.

== Career statistics ==
As of 12 April 2019.

Appearances and goals by club, season and competition
Club	Season	League			Cup		Continental		Other		Total	
Club	Season	Division	Apps	Goals	Apps	Goals	Apps	Goals	Apps	Goals	Apps	Goals
All Boys	2017–18	Primera B Nacional	2	0	0	0	—		0	0	2	0
All Boys	2018–19	Primera B Metropolitana	16	1	1	0	—		0	0	17	1
Career total			18	1	1	0	—		0	0	19	1
