= Matías Ruiz Díaz =

Argentine footballer

Personal information
- Full name: Matías Lautaro Ruiz Díaz
- Date of birth: 9 September 1996 (age 30)
- Place of birth: La Plata, Argentina
- Height: 1.79 m (5 ft 10 1/2 in)
- Position: Right-back

Team information
- Current team: Estudiantes RC
- Number: 21

Youth career
- Fívica de Gonnet
- Deportivo de City Bell
- Estudiantes LP

Senior career*
Years	Team	Apps	(Gls)
2017–2024	Estudiantes LP	7	(0)
2019–2021	→ Guillermo Brown (loan)	47	(2)
2022	→ Central Córdoba SdE (loan)	3	(0)
2022	→ Quilmes (loan)	9	(1)
2023	→ Patronato (loan)	25	(0)
2024–2025	Independiente Rivadavia	20	(0)
2025–	Estudiantes RC	33	(1)
- * Club domestic league appearances and goals as of 17:20, 11 May 2026 (UTC)

Matías Lautaro Ruiz Díaz (born 9 September 1996) is an Argentine professional footballer who plays as a right-back for Estudiantes RC.

== Career ==
Ruiz Díaz started his senior career with Estudiantes, following youth spells with Fívica de Gonnet and Deportivo de City Bell. After first appearing as an unused substitute for a 2017 Copa Sudamericana match with Nacional Potosí on 13 July 2017, Ruíz Díaz made his professional debut in the following December during a league win away to Talleres. He made five further appearances during the 2017–18 season.

On 4 July 2019, Ruiz Díaz was loaned out to Guillermo Brown for the 2019–20 season. The loan was later extended until the end of 2021. In January 2022, he was loaned out to Central Córdoba SdE until the end of 2022. Due to lack of playing time, the loan spell was terminated on 11 June 2022, and Ruíz Díaz was instead sent out on loan at Primera Nacional side Quilmes for the rest of the year.

== Career statistics ==
As of 30 September 2018.

Club statistics
Club	Season	League			Cup (Note: Includes the Copa Argentina)		League Cup		Continental (Note: Includes the Copa Libertadores and Copa Sudamericana)		Other		Total	
Club	Season	Division	Apps	Goals	Apps	Goals	Apps	Goals	Apps	Goals	Apps	Goals	Apps	Goals
Estudiantes	2017–18	Primera División	6	0	0	0	—		0	0	0	0	6	0
Estudiantes	2018–19	Primera División	1	0	0	0	—		0	0	0	0	1	0
Career total			7	0	0	0	—		0	0	0	0	7	0
