= Federico Rasmussen =

Argentine footballer

Personal information
- Date of birth: 4 March 1992 (age 34)
- Place of birth: Coronel Dorrego, Argentina
- Height: 1.91 m (6 ft 3 in)
- Position: Centre-back

Team information
- Current team: Colón (on loan from Godoy Cruz)

Youth career
- Independiente de Dorrego
- 2007–2013: Lanús

Senior career*
Years	Team	Apps	(Gls)
2013–2014	Lanús	0	(0)
2013–2014	→ Flandria (loan)	9	(0)
2015	Tiro Federal (BB)	21	(1)
2016	Mitre	0	(0)
2016	Independiente de Dorrego		
2016–2017	Villa Mitre	23	(1)
2017–2021	Guillermo Brown	27	(1)
2019–2020	→ Atlante (loan)	24	(1)
2020	→ Querétaro (loan)	0	(0)
2021–2023	Sarmiento	30	(0)
2023–	Godoy Cruz	102	(0)
2026–	→ Colón (loan)	4	(0)

International career
2009	Argentina U17	2	(0)
2012	Argentina U20	1	(0)
- * Club domestic league appearances and goals as of 18:24, 20 March 2026 (UTC)

Federico Rasmussen (born 4 March 1992) is an Argentine professional footballer who plays as a centre-back for Colón, on loan from Godoy Cruz.

== Club career ==
Rasmussen's first club was Independiente de Dorrego, who he left for Lanús in 2007. He didn't play, though did spend a season out on loan with Flandria in 2013–14; where he made nine appearances in Primera B Metropolitana. January 2015 saw Rasmussen complete a move to Tiro Federal (BB) of Torneo Federal A. He made his debut on 22 March against Alianza, before scoring his first senior goal in June versus Deportivo Madryn. He stayed in tier three with Mitre in January 2016 but soon left to rejoin Independiente de Dorrego. In mid-2016, Rasmussen moved to Villa Mitre. One goal and twenty-three came.

Guillermo Brown signed Rasmussen in August 2017. His bow came against ex-club Mitre in the following December. On 6 June 2019, Rasmussen agreed a move abroad for the first time after penning loan terms with Ascenso MX side Atlante. He debuted during a goalless draw at home to Mineros de Zacatecas on 2 August, which preceded a further twenty-four appearances; he also scored once, in a win over Leones Negros on 27 September. On 18 June 2020, Rasmussen headed out on loan to Liga MX club Querétaro. However, due to foreign player limits, he quickly returned to his parent club.

At the end of July 2021, Rasmussen joined Sarmiento.

== International career ==
In 2009, Rasmussen was called up to represent Argentina at the FIFA U-17 World Cup in Nigeria. He won two caps at the tournament versus the hosts and continent counterparts Colombia; who eliminated them. He played for the U20s in December 2012. Sansinena

== Career statistics ==
As of 16 December 2020

Club statistics
Club	Season	League			National cup		League cup		Continental		Other		Total	
Club	Season	Division	Apps	Goals	Apps	Goals	Apps	Goals	Apps	Goals	Apps	Goals	Apps	Goals
Lanús	2013–14	Primera División	0	0	0	0	—		0	0	0	0	0	0
Lanús	2014	Primera División	0	0	0	0	—		0	0	0	0	0	0
Lanús	Total		0	0	0	0	—		0	0	0	0	0	0
Flandria (loan)	2013–14	Primera B Metropolitana	9	0	0	0	—		—		0	0	9	0
Tiro Federal	2015	Torneo Federal A	21	1	0	0	—		—		0	0	21	1
Mitre	2016	Torneo Federal A	0	0	0	0	—		—		0	0	0	0
Villa Mitre	2016–17	Torneo Federal A	23	1	0	0	—		—		5 (Note: Appearance(s) in the Torneo Federal A play-offs)	0	28	1
Guillermo Brown	2017–18	Primera B Nacional	6	0	0	0	—		—		0	0	6	0
Guillermo Brown	2018–19	Primera B Nacional	21	1	1	0	—		—		0	0	22	1
Guillermo Brown	2019–20	Primera B Nacional	0	0	0	0	—		—		0	0	0	0
Guillermo Brown	2020	Primera B Nacional	0	0	0	0	—		—		0	0	0	0
Guillermo Brown	Total		27	1	1	0	—		—		0	0	28	1
Atlante (loan)	2019–20	Ascenso MX	24	1	1	0	—		—		0	0	25	1
Querétaro (loan)	2020–21	Liga MX	0	0	0	0	—		—		0	0	0	0
Career total			104	4	2	0	—		0	0	5	0	111	4
