= Hernán Altolaguirre =

Argentine footballer (born 1993)

Personal information
- Date of birth: February 19, 1993 (age 33)
- Place of birth: Santa Rosa, La Pampa, Argentina
- Height: 1.82 m (6 ft 0 in)
- Position: Forward

Senior career*
Years	Team	Apps	(Gls)
2012–2016	Newell's Old Boys	1	(0)
2014	→ Cobreloa (loan)	7	(0)
2015	→ Jorge Newbery Junín (loan)	5	(2)
2015–2016	→ Evian TG (loan)	8	(0)
2015–2016	→ Evian TG II (loan)	11	(2)
2016	Alianza Universidad	14	(4)
2017–2018	Rivadavia	22	(10)
2018–2019	Guillermo Brown	21	(1)
2019–2020	Cipolletti	12	(3)
2020–2021	Flandria	14	(1)
2021–2022	Atletico Uri	28	(9)
2022–2023	Ilvamaddalena	32	(6)
2023–2024	All Boys SR	4	(1)
Medal record
First place	Argentine Primera División	2013
- * Club domestic league appearances and goals

Hernán Alexis Altolaguirre (born February 19, 1993) is an Argentine former footballer who played as a forward.

== Career ==
Altolaguirre began his career with Newell's Old Boys. He was sent out to Cobreloa, Jorge Newbery de Junín and on a one-year loan to Ligue 2's Thonon Evian Grand Genève FC in August 2015. After leaving Newell's, Altolaguirre would play in the lower levels of Argentine and Peruvian football. His best season would come in the Torneo Federal A with Club Rivadavia, before he signed for Primera Nacional side Guillermo Brown de Puerto Madryn. After a poor season with Guillermo Brown, Altolaguirre joined Federal A side Club Cipolletti.

After stints with Serie D clubs Atletico Uri and Ilvamaddalena, Altolaguirre returned to his homeland in 2023 and played for All Boys de Santa Rosa. He announced his retirement in April 2024.

== Titles ==
- Newell's Old Boys 2013 (Torneo Final Primera División Argentina Championship)
