= Cristian García (footballer, born 1996) =

Argentine footballer

Personal information
- Full name: Cristian Gabriel García
- Date of birth: 22 July 1996 (age 30)
- Place of birth: General Alvear, Argentina
- Height: 1.86 m (6 ft 1 in)
- Position: Midfielder

Team information
- Current team: Delfín S.C.

Senior career*
Years	Team	Apps	(Gls)
2015–2018	CAI	38	(1)
2018–2023	Guillermo Brown	59	(2)
2021	→ Delfín (loan)	25	(0)
2023–	Delfín	5	(0)
- * Club domestic league appearances and goals as of 19:45, 24 July 2022 (UTC)

Cristian Gabriel García (born 22 July 1996) is an Argentine professional footballer who plays as a midfielder for Delfín.

== Career ==
García began his career with CAI. He made twelve appearances in the 2015 Torneo Federal A campaign, in which he was sent off three times including in the relegation play-off against Gutiérrez on 30 October as the club were relegated to Torneo Federal B. He then made twenty-seven appearances and scored once in the fourth tier across three seasons. On 30 June 2018, García joined Primera B Nacional side Guillermo Brown. His professional league debut subsequently arrived during a home defeat to Brown in August, having made his club bow in the Copa Argentina over Tigre in the prior month.

== Career statistics ==
As of 23 January 2019.

Club statistics
Club	Season	League			Cup		Continental		Other		Total	
Club	Season	Division	Apps	Goals	Apps	Goals	Apps	Goals	Apps	Goals	Apps	Goals
CAI	2015	Torneo Federal A	11	0	0	0	—		1 (Note: Appearance(s) in the Torneo Federal A play-offs)	0	12	0
Guillermo Brown	2018–19	Primera B Nacional	8	0	1	0	—		0	0	9	0
Career total			19	0	1	0	—		1	0	21	0
