= César Taborda =

Argentine footballer

Personal information
- Full name: César Omar Taborda
- Date of birth: January 23, 1984 (age 42)
- Place of birth: Villa Constitución, Santa Fe, Argentina
- Height: 1.89 m (6 ft 2 in)
- Position: Goalkeeper

Team information
- Current team: Nueva Chicago

Youth career
- 1991–2000: San Lorenzo (VC)
- 2000–2002: Club Duchini
- 2002–2005: Estudiantes LP

Senior career*
Years	Team	Apps	(Gls)
2005–2011	Estudiantes LP	7	(0)
2006–2007	→ Defensa y Justicia (loan)	31	(0)
2009	→ O'Higgins (loan)	19	(0)
2011–2013	Independiente Rivadavia	36	(0)
2013–2014	Aldosivi	6	(0)
2014–2016	Chacarita Juniors	35	(0)
2016–2017	San Martín Tucumán	59	(0)
2017–2019	Central Córdoba SdE	54	(0)
2019–2020	Guillermo Brown	21	(0)
2020–2021	Central Córdoba SdE	5	(0)
2022–	Nueva Chicago	7	(0)
- * Club domestic league appearances and goals as of 09:38, 26 March 2022 (UTC)

César Omar Taborda (born January 23, 1984) is an Argentine football goalkeeper who plays for Nueva Chicago.

== Career ==
Taborda played youth football for Estudiantes de La Plata from 2002 to 2004, when he signed his first professional contract. Before making any appearance for the first team, he was loaned to second division side Defensa y Justicia for the 2006–07 season, where he played 31 games. Upon his return to Estudiantes, he was relegated to third choice goalkeeper behind Mariano Andújar and Damián Albil.

In 2009, Taborda had a 6-month period on loan at O'Higgins in Chile, where he played 18 games. After his second return to Estudiantes, he played his first game for the team replacing Albil in the 16th minute of the first half of a 0–1 defeat to Argentinos Juniors, for the 2009 Apertura. The following fixture, he had his first start in a 1–1 draw with Lanús. With this participation, Taborda became the first goalkeeper from Estudiantes' youth divisions to start for the team since Nicolás Tauber in 2002.

Taborda was Albil's substitute in Estudiantes' 2009 FIFA Club World Cup runner-up participation, and was Agustín Orión's substitute in the team's 2010 Apertura winning campaign. In the latter, he played four games, two as a starter and two coming on as a substitute for an injured Orión. He also started in the two games of the 2010 Recopa Sudamericana, due to Orión being suspended.

== Honours ==
Estudiantes

- Argentine Primera División (1): 2010 Apertura
