= Mauricio Vera =

Argentine footballer

Personal information
- Full name: Mauricio Andrés Vera
- Date of birth: 8 May 1998 (age 28)
- Place of birth: Juan José Paso, Buenos Aires, Argentina
- Height: 1.78 m (5 ft 10 in)
- Position: Midfielder

Team information
- Current team: Bhayangkara Presisi
- Number: 28

Youth career
- River Plate

Senior career*
Years	Team	Apps	(Gls)
2016–2017	River Plate	0	(0)
2017–2021	Estudiantes LP	0	(0)
2019–2020	→ Guillermo Brown (loan)	29	(2)
2021	San Martín SJ	19	(1)
2022–2023	San Luis	56	(0)
2024–2025	Boston River	58	(0)
2026	Deportes Concepción	2	(0)
2026	→ Nacional (loan)	5	(0)
2026–	Bhayangkara Presisi	1	(0)
- * Club domestic league appearances and goals as of 5 September 2026

Mauricio Andrés Vera (born 8 May 1998) is an Argentine professional footballer who plays as a midfielder for Super League club Bhayangkara Presisi.

== Career ==
Born in Juan José Paso, Buenos Aires, Argentina, Vera was trained at River Plate. In 2017, he switched to Estudiantes de La Plata and was loaned out to Guillermo Brown in August 2019.

In 2021, Vera joined San Martín de San Juan in the Primera B Nacional.

In January 2022, Vera moved abroad and signed with Chilean club San Luis de Quillota.

After two seasons with San Luis, Vera moved to Uruguay to play for Boston River in 2024 and 2025.

Back to Chile, Vera signed with Deportes Concepción for the 2026 season. In February of the same year, he moved to Uruguayan club Nacional on loan with an option to buy. After ending his loan with Nacional, he ended his contract with Deportes Concepción on 17 July 2026.

In August 2026, Vera completed a transfer to Super League club Bhayangkara Presisi.
