= Nery Pumpido =

Argentine footballer (born 1957)

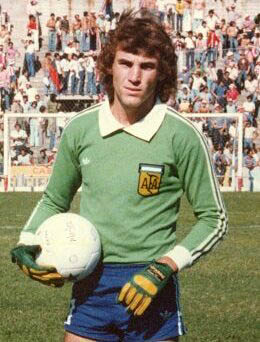
- Pumpido playing for the Argentina national team.

Personal information
- Full name: Nery Alberto Pumpido
- Date of birth: 30 July 1957 (age 69)
- Place of birth: Monje, Santa Fe, Argentina
- Height: 1.82 m (6 ft 0 in)
- Position: Goalkeeper

Senior career*
Years	Team	Apps	(Gls)
1976–1981	Unión Santa Fe	137	(0)
1981–1983	Vélez Sársfield	78	(0)
1983–1988	River Plate	121	(0)
1988–1990	Real Betis	67	(0)
1991–1992	Unión Santa Fe	37	(0)
1993	Lanús	0	(0)
Total		440	(0)

International career
1982–1990	Argentina	36	(0)

Managerial career
- 1999–2001: Unión Santa Fe
- 2001–2003: Olimpia
- 2003–2004: Tigres UANL
- 2005–2007: Newell's Old Boys
- 2007: Veracruz
- 2008: Al Shabab
- 2010–2011: Olimpia
- 2012: Godoy Cruz
- 2012–2013: Unión Santa Fe
Medal record
Men's football
Representing Argentina
FIFA World Cup
Winner	1986 Mexico
Runner-up	1990 Italy
Copa América
Third place	1989 Brazil
- * Club domestic league appearances and goals

Nery Alberto Pumpido (born 30 July 1957) is an Argentine football coach and former goalkeeper who played for Argentina in two World Cups. After retirement, Pumpido moved into club management. His nephew Facundo Pumpido is also a professional footballer.

== Club career ==
Pumpido began his career at his home city side Unión de Santa Fe. After a brief stint for Vélez Sársfield, where his form saw him called up for the 1982 FIFA World Cup squad, he moved to Club Atlético River Plate to replace the departing national 'keeper Ubaldo Fillol. Here, he became part of the side that won the Argentine Primera División as well as the Copa Libertadores for the first time in its history in 1986 under manager Héctor Veira. In 1988, he transferred to Spanish club Real Betis where, in 1989, he almost lost a finger during a training session when his wedding ring caught on a nail in the crossbar of the goal. He returned to Argentina to his first club, Union in 1991. His last season before retirement from football was at the Lanus Athletic Club in 1993.

== International career ==
Although chosen by Argentina national team coach César Luis Menotti as the third goalkeeper of the Argentina national team in the 1982 World Cup, he did not play in the tournament. Pumpido eventually made his international debut against Paraguay the following year. He was the starting goalkeeper during Argentina's victorious 1986 World Cup campaign, playing in all seven games, conceding just five goals in 630 minutes of football, and keeping three clean sheets.

At the 1990 World Cup, Pumpido was at fault for Cameroon's winning goal, fumbling François Omam-Biyik's header into the net as the African nation shocked the defending champions at the tournament's opening game in Milan, winning by a goal to nil. Pumpido then broke his leg in the eleventh minute of Argentina's second game against the USSR, which the Argentines won two goals to nil. He was replaced by substitute Sergio Goycochea (also his understudy at River Plate), who had not played a game in eight months. Goycochea eventually became key to Argentina's run to the final, saving penalty shoot-out kicks in the quarter-final win over Yugoslavia and the semi-final victory over hosts Italy.

== Coaching career ==
After retiring as a player, Pumpido went into management. After several seasons at Unión de Santa Fe he took over at Paraguayan side Olimpia de Asunción, winning the Copa Libertadores in 2002. After resigning from Olimpia due to a "lack of support from the president", he then became coach of UANL Tigres in Mexico, reaching the final of the 2003–04 Primera División de México championship. Between October 2005 and July 2006, Pumpido coached Argentinian Primera División club Newell's Old Boys, followed by brief stints at Mexican club side CD Veracruz and Saudi club Al Shabab, before his return to Olimpia, Paraguay's most successful football club and winner of three Libertadores cups, as well as one Intercontinental cup. On 23 December 2011, he was hired as coach of the Argentinian club Godoy Cruz. On 3 September 2012, he returned to Unión de Santa Fe for a second spell as manager.

== Honours ==
=== Player ===
Unión Santa Fe

- Liga Santafesina de Fútbol: 1979

River Plate

- Primera División: 1985–86
- Intercontinental Cup: 1986
- Copa Libertadores: 1986
- Copa Interamericana: 1986

Real Betis

- Segunda División runner-up: 1989–90

Argentina

- FIFA World Cup: 1986; runner-up:1990

Individual

- South American Team of the Year: 1986

=== Manager ===
Unión Santa Fe

- Liga Santafesina de Fútbol: Apertura 2000

Olimpia

- Copa Libertadores: 2002
