= Mauro Bazán =

Argentine footballer (born 1993)

Personal information
- Date of birth: 27 April 1993 (age 33)
- Place of birth: Lomas de Zamora, Argentina
- Position: Right back

Senior career*
Years	Team	Apps	(Gls)
2020-2022	Club Atlético Brown	36	(0)
2018-2020	Guillermo Brown	34	(0)
2016-2017	Douglas Haig	28	(0)
2013-2014	Racing Club	1	(0)
- * Club domestic league appearances and goals

Mauro Ezequiel Bazán (born 27 April 1993 in Lomas de Zamora, Argentina) is an Argentine footballer who plays right back. He first played for Racing Club, in the Argentina Primera Division, and later played for Guillermo Brown de Puerto Madryn, in the Primera B Nacional.

While playing for Racing Club, Bazán was part of the team that won the Torneo Transición in 2014.
