= Leandro Lugarzo =

Argentine footballer

Personal information
- Date of birth: 20 July 1990 (age 36)
- Place of birth: Avellaneda, Argentina
- Height: 1.86 m (6 ft 1 in)
- Position: Centre-back

Team information
- Current team: Los Andes

Youth career
- Lanús

Senior career*
Years	Team	Apps	(Gls)
2012–2013	Arsenal de Sarandí	0	(0)
2012–2013	→ Excursionistas (loan)	24	(0)
2013–2015	Dock Sud	56	(1)
2016–2018	Deportivo Español	58	(1)
2018–2019	Almagro	5	(0)
2019–2020	Guillermo Brown	8	(0)
2020–2021	Comunicaciones	6	(0)
2021–	Los Andes	40	(3)
- * Club domestic league appearances and goals as of 18:29, 24 July 2022 (UTC)

Leandro Lugarzo (born 20 July 1990) is an Argentine professional footballer who plays as a centre-back for Los Andes.

== Career ==
Lugarzo played in the youth of Lanús and Arsenal de Sarandí. In 2012, Lugarzo was loaned to Primera C Metropolitana's Excursionistas, remaining for the 2012–13 campaign which allowed the defender to make twenty-four appearances. Fellow fourth tier team Dock Sud signed Lugarzo permanently on 30 June 2013, which preceded one goal in fifty-six matches over two years for the club. January 2016 saw Lugarzo complete a move to Deportivo Español of Primera B Metropolitana. His first appearance was also his professional debut, with Lugarzo featuring for the full duration of a draw with Tristán Suárez on 21 February.

Having made sixty-one appearances and scoring once, in September 2017 versus San Telmo, Lugarzo departed Deportivo Español to join Almagro on 22 July 2018. He made his bow on 6 October against Brown. Lugarzo spent the 2019–20 campaign in Primera B Nacional with Guillermo Brown, appearing in a total of eight matches. On 18 September 2020, Lugarzo joined third tier outfit Comunicaciones. In February 2021, Lugarzo joined Los Andes.

== Career statistics ==
As of 27 September 2020.

Club statistics
Club	Season	League			Cup		League Cup		Continental		Other		Total	
Club	Season	Division	Apps	Goals	Apps	Goals	Apps	Goals	Apps	Goals	Apps	Goals	Apps	Goals
Arsenal de Sarandí	2012–13	Primera División	0	0	0	0	—		—		0	0	0	0
Excursionistas (loan)	2012–13	Primera C Metropolitana	24	0	0	0	—		—		0	0	24	0
Deportivo Español	2016	Primera B Metropolitana	14	0	0	0	—		—		0	0	14	0
Deportivo Español	2016–17	Primera B Metropolitana	24	0	0	0	—		—		3 (Note: Appearance(s) in the Primera B Metropolitana play-offs)	0	27	0
Deportivo Español	2017–18	Primera B Metropolitana	20	1	0	0	—		—		0	0	20	1
Deportivo Español	Total		58	1	0	0	—		—		3	0	61	1
Almagro	2018–19	Primera B Nacional	5	0	0	0	—		—		0	0	5	0
Guillermo Brown	2019–20	Primera B Nacional	8	0	0	0	—		—		0	0	8	0
Comunicaciones	2020–21	Primera B Metropolitana	0	0	0	0	—		—		0	0	0	0
Career total			95	1	0	0	—		—		3	0	98	1
