= Estadio Raúl Conti =

Football stadium in Puerto Madryn, Argentina

Coordinates: 42°46′41″S 65°2′18″W

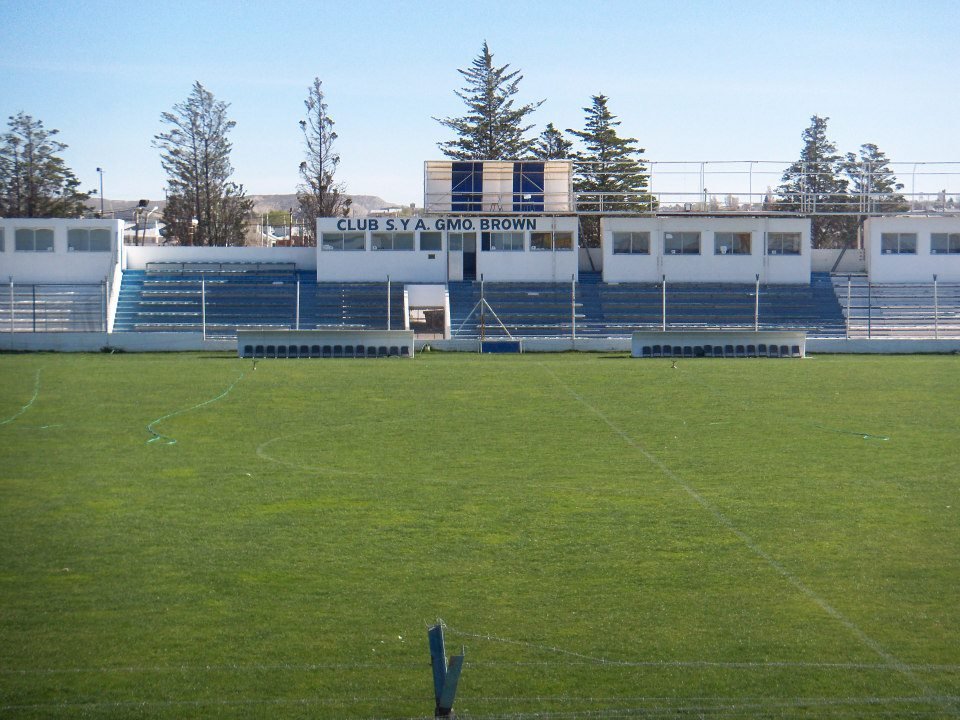
- View of the stadium in 2018
- Interactive map of Estadio Raúl Conti
- Address: Puerto Madryn; Argentina
- Owner: Club Guillermo Brown
- Capacity: 15,000
- Field size: 102 x 72 m

Construction
- Opened: 25 May 1967; 59 years ago

Tenants
- Club Guillermo Brown (1967–present); Deportivo Madryn (temporarily)

Estadio Raúl Conti is a stadium in Puerto Madryn, Argentina. Inaugurated on May 25, 1967, it is the home venue of local club Guillermo Brown. The stadium has a capacity for 15,000 spectators.

It is also used for rugby union matches of local clubs such as Puerto Madryn Rugby Club. The Argentina national rugby team played at the ground in 2006, winning 27–25 against Wales. It was the first time Argentina played a test match in Puerto Madryn.

The stadium is one of the three stadiums with higher capacity in the region, along with Estadio Cayetano Castro (Racing de Trelew) and El Fortín (Germinal de Rawson). It was named after Raúl Conti, an executive of Club Guillermo Brown that promoted its construction.

== History ==
In May 1961, the Secretary of the Navy of Argentina gave Club Guillermo Brown a land after arrangements made by club presidents Norberto Rico and Salustiano Sebastián Eguillor during their respective tenures. The land had an estimated surface of 50,000 m2. The stadium was inaugurated on May 25, 1967, after three years of construction. The venue also had running and horse racing tracks. It had a cement grandstand with a capacity for 500 people, and three changing rooms (for the home team, visitor and referees), and a broadcast booth.

Under the presidency of Carlos Eliceche, in 2000 the grass pitch was inaugurated. Years later, the capacity was increased from 8,000 to 15,000 people on the occasion of the unprecedented Los Pumas vs Wales test match, in June 2006. The stadium was at its full capacity for that test match.
