= Luciano Sánchez (footballer, born September 1994) =

Argentine footballer

Personal information
- Full name: Luciano Federico Lautaro Sánchez
- Date of birth: 15 September 1994 (age 32)
- Place of birth: Argentina
- Height: 1.82 m (6 ft 0 in)
- Position: Centre-back

Team information
- Current team: Talleres RdE

Senior career*
Years	Team	Apps	(Gls)
2015–2016	El Porvenir	37	(2)
2016–2017	General Lamadrid	25	(3)
2017–2018	Sportivo Italiano	36	(0)
2018–2020	Guillermo Brown	27	(0)
2020–2022	Deportivo Camioneros	63	(1)
2023	UAI Urquiza	24	(0)
2024–	Talleres RdE	51	(1)
- * Club domestic league appearances and goals as of 18:02, 21 August 2025 (UTC)

Luciano Federico Lautaro Sánchez (born 15 September 1994) is an Argentine professional footballer who plays as a centre-back for Talleres RdE.

== Career ==
Sánchez's career began in Primera D Metropolitana with El Porvenir. Two goals in thirty-seven fixtures followed across the 2015 and 2016 campaigns. For the following season, Sánchez completed a move to fellow fifth tier outfit General Lamadrid. After making twenty-five appearances and netting twice for Villa Devoto club, Sánchez went up to Primera C Metropolitana with Sportivo Italiano in 2017 to play thirty-six times. A year later, Sánchez joined Primera B Nacional side Guillermo Brown. He made his debut against Tigre in the Copa Argentina in July 2018, which preceded his professional league bow on 30 September versus Olimpo.

== Career statistics ==
As of 21 January 2019.

Club statistics
Club	Season	League			Cup		Continental		Other		Total	
Club	Season	Division	Apps	Goals	Apps	Goals	Apps	Goals	Apps	Goals	Apps	Goals
General Lamadrid	2016–17	Primera D Metropolitana	25	3	0	0	—		0	0	25	3
Sportivo Italiano	2017–18	Primera C Metropolitana	36	0	0	0	—		0	0	36	0
Guillermo Brown	2018–19	Primera B Nacional	2	0	1	0	—		0	0	3	0
Career total			63	0	1	0	—		0	0	64	0

== Honours ==
El Porvenir

- Primera D Metropolitana: 2016
