= Luis Arias (footballer) =

Argentine professional footballer (born 1991)

Personal information
- Full name: Luis Alberto Arias
- Date of birth: 19 April 1991 (age 35)
- Place of birth: Isidro Casanova, Argentina
- Height: 1.81 m (5 ft 11 in)
- Position: Defender

Youth career
- Almirante Brown

Senior career*
Years	Team	Apps	(Gls)
2012–2014	Almirante Brown	7	(0)
2014–2015	Vélez Sarsfield	12	(0)
2015	San Martín	8	(0)
2016	Atlético Camioneros	1	(0)
2017	El Porvenir	16	(2)
2018–2021	Almirante Brown	12	(0)
- * Club domestic league appearances and goals as of 17:28, 8 June 2022 (UTC)

Luis Alberto Arias (born 19 April 1991) is an Argentine professional footballer who plays as a defender.

== Career ==
Arias played the early years of his senior career with Almirante Brown. He made his debut in a Primera B Nacional fixture on 10 June 2012 versus Guillermo Brown, taking the place of Diego Cisterna after eighty-five minutes. Arias didn't appear in the 2012–13 season, though returned in 2013–14 to make six appearances; five of which as a starter, as the club were relegated to Primera B Metropolitana. Arias left soon after, joining Vélez Sarsfield in Torneo Federal B. Twelve appearances followed as they won promotion to the 2015 Torneo Federal A. He left midway through that subsequent campaign to San Martín.

After stints with Atlético Camioneros and El Porvenir de San Clemente, where he scored his first two senior goals, Arias completed a return to Almirante Brown on 20 July 2018. His secondary debut came on 25 August in a 1–0 victory over Barracas Central.

== Career statistics ==
As of 26 April 2019.

Appearances and goals by club, season and competition
Club	Season	League			Cup		League Cup		Continental		Other		Total	
Club	Season	Division	Apps	Goals	Apps	Goals	Apps	Goals	Apps	Goals	Apps	Goals	Apps	Goals
Almirante Brown	2011–12	Primera B Nacional	1	0	0	0	—		—		0	0	1	0
Almirante Brown	2012–13	Primera B Nacional	0	0	0	0	—		—		0	0	0	0
Almirante Brown	2013–14	Primera B Nacional	6	0	1	0	—		—		0	0	7	0
Almirante Brown	Total		7	0	1	0	—		—		0	0	8	0
Vélez Sarsfield	2014	Torneo Federal B	12	0	1	0	—		—		0	0	13	0
Vélez Sarsfield	2015	Torneo Federal A	0	0	0	0	—		—		0	0	0	0
Vélez Sarsfield	Total		12	0	1	0	—		—		0	0	13	0
San Martín	2015	Torneo Federal B	8	0	0	0	—		—		0	0	8	0
El Porvenir de San Clemente	2017	Torneo Federal B	16	2	0	0	—		—		0	0	16	2
Almirante Brown	2018–19	Primera B Metropolitana	5	0	0	0	—		—		0	0	5	0
Career total			48	2	2	0	—		—		0	0	50	2
