= Comisión de Actividades Infantiles =

Argentine football club

C.A.I.
- Full name: Comisión de Actividades Infantiles
- Nicknames: Azzuro; La CAI (The Cai)
- Founded: 1984; 41 years ago
- Ground: Estadio Municipal, Comodoro Rivadavia, Chubut, Argentina
- Capacity: 10,000
- Chairman: Carlos Anibal Peralta
- Manager: Nicolás Segura
- League: Torneo Argentino B
- Torneo Argentino B 2017: 22nd (Torneo Argentino A relegated via playoff)
- Website: www.caicr.com.ar
Home colours

Comisión de Actividades Infantiles (English: Committee on Children's Activities), also known simply as CAI, is an Argentine football club located in the city of Comodoro Rivadavia, of Chubut Province. The team plays in Torneo Argentino A.

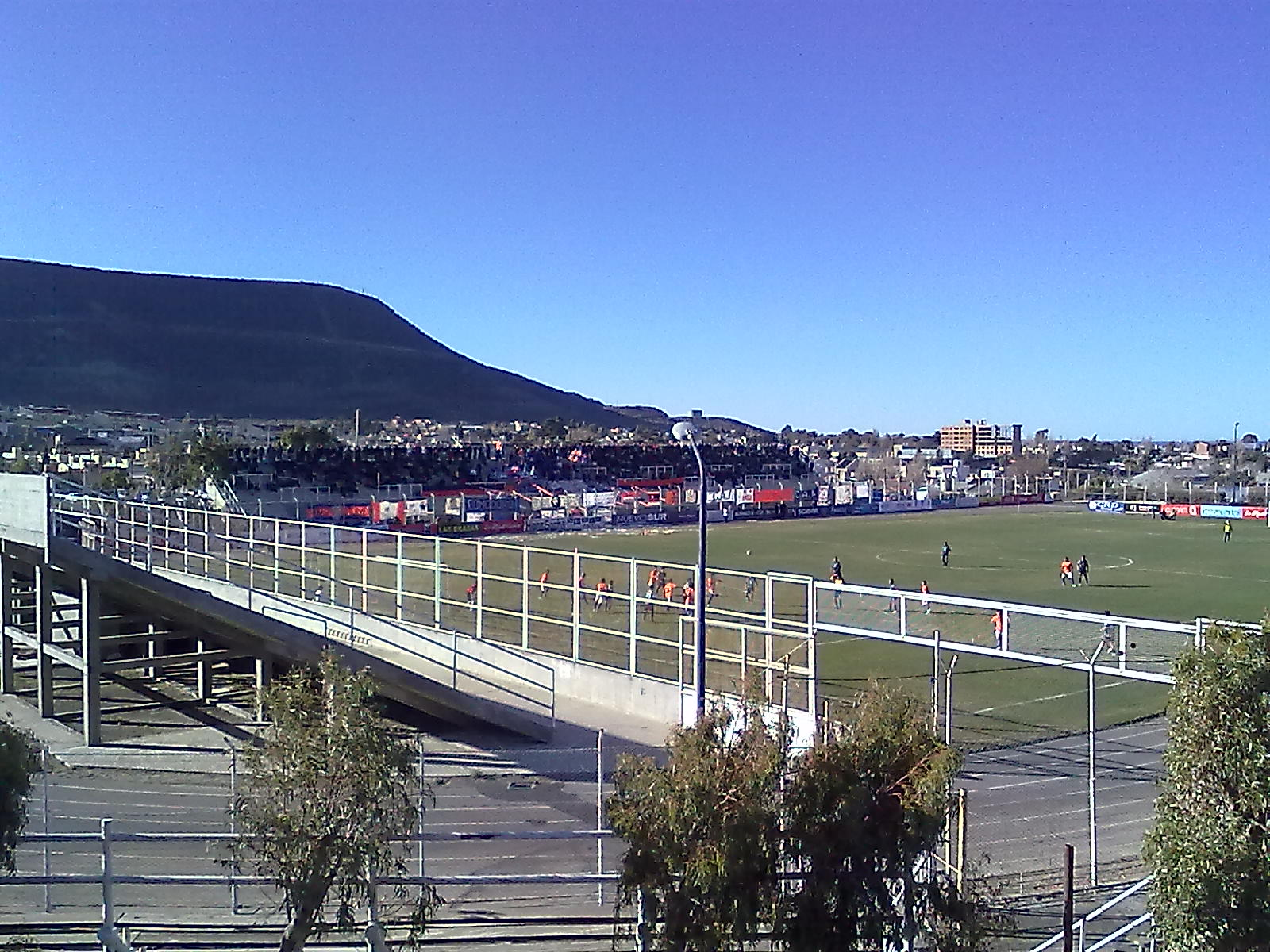
The Stade Municipal de Comodoro Rivadavia in a game where CAI faced Defensa y Justicia

The club was founded on 1 January 1984, as a sports club for young people, though by 1989 the activity focused only on football. The team currently plays in the Primera B division of the Argentine league (which is equivalent to the second division). Home games are played at the Estadio Municipal de Comodoro Rivadavia, which has a capacity of approximately 10,000 seats. The club focuses primarily on the development of players from its youth divisions.

== Current squad ==
As of November 2017.

Note: Flags indicate national team as defined under FIFA eligibility rules; some limited exceptions apply. Players may hold more than one non-FIFA nationality.

No.	Pos.	Nation	Player
1	GK	ARG	Mateo Grasso
2	DF	ARG	Sebastián Leguiza
11	FW	ARG	Fernando Pasquale

== National honours ==
- Torneo Argentino A: 1

2001/02

== See also ==
- List of football clubs in Argentina
- Argentine football league system
