= Club Atlético Los Andes =

Coordinates: 34°45′28″S 58°25′12″W

Los Andes
- Full name: Club Atlético Los Andes
- Nickname: Mil Rayitas
- Founded: 1 January 1917; 109 years ago
- Ground: Estadio Eduardo Gallardón, Lomas de Zamora
- Capacity: 36,542
- Chairman: Omar Plaini
- Manager: Leonardo Lemos
- League: Primera Nacional
- 2025: Primera Nacional Zone A, 14th of 18
- Website: losandesoficial.com
Home colours	Away colours

Club Atlético Los Andes is an Argentine sports club based in the Lomas de Zamora district of Greater Buenos Aires. The football team currently plays in the Primera Nacional, the second division of the Argentine football league system.

The club was founded by a group of young people in 1917, and its name was chosen to commemorate the first balloon flight across the Andes mountain range, which was undertaken in 1916 by Eduardo Bradley.

Los Andes has had three runs in the Argentine Primera División: the first was in 1961, the second time was between the 1968 and 1971 Metropolitano championships. Los Andes best ever final position was an 8° position overall in 1968 Nacional.

The third run in Primera División was in 2000–01 and lasted only one season: Los Andes finished 19th out of 20 teams and was relegated to Primera B Nacional with the worst points average in the division.

After some seasons in the lower divisions, in 2014 Los Andes returned to B Nacional after winning a championship of the Primera B Metropolitana, but be relegated in the 2018–19 season.

== Current squad ==
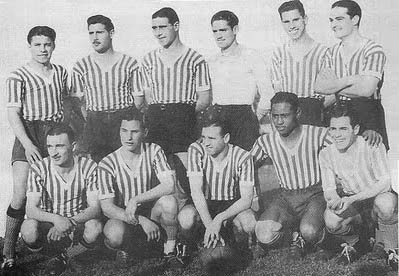
The 1938 team, which achieved the Primera C championship that year

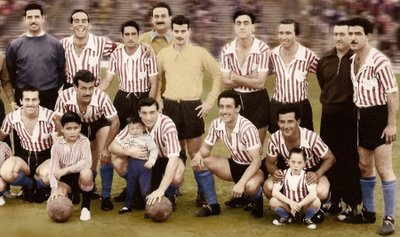
Los Andes team in 1957, which obtained the Primera C title

As of 7 August 2022

Note: Flags indicate national team as defined under FIFA eligibility rules; some limited exceptions apply. Players may hold more than one non-FIFA nationality.

No.	Pos.	Nation	Player
—	GK	ARG	Lucas Di Grazia
—	GK	ARG	Leonardo Romero
—	GK	ARG	Martín Soria
—	DF	ARG	Facundo Ardiles
—	DF	ARG	Emanuel Del Bianco (loan from Ferro)
—	DF	ARG	Nicolás Digiano (loan from Montevideo City)
—	DF	ARG	Mariano Gancedo
—	DF	ARG	Tomás Leuzzi
—	DF	ARG	Leandro Lugarzo
—	DF	ARG	Gabriel Pereyra
—	DF	ARG	Matías Presentado
—	DF	ARG	Luciano Vargas
—	MF	ARG	Gastón Ada
—	MF	ARG	Cristian Canan
—	MF	ARG	Gianluca Caruso
—	MF	ARG	Francesco Celeste
—	MF	ARG	Pablo Cortizo

No.	Pos.	Nation	Player
—	MF	ARG	Diego Galeano
—	MF	ARG	Matías González
—	MF	ARG	Agustín Guiffrey
—	MF	ARG	Pablo Medina (loan from Almirante Brown)
—	MF	ARG	Gabriel Moreno
—	MF	PAR	César Peralta
—	MF	ARG	Luis Miguel Pérez
—	MF	ARG	Mateo Ramírez
—	MF	ARG	Tobías Rusch
—	FW	ARG	Iván Arbello (loan from Almirante Brown)
—	FW	ARG	Alan Espeche (loan from All Boys)
—	FW	ARG	Agustín Mansilla
—	FW	ARG	Jonatan Morán
—	FW	ARG	Nazareno Pompei
—	FW	ARG	Rodrigo Trejo

== Honours ==
- Primera B Metropolitana (2): 1960, 2014
- Primera C (3): 1926, 1938, 1957
