= Guillermo Brown de Puerto Madryn =

Argentine sports club

Guillermo Brown
- Full name: Club Social y Atlético Guillermo Brown
- Nicknames: La Banda; Capo Del Sur; La Banda del Sur
- Founded: January 14, 1945; 81 years ago
- Ground: Estadio Raúl Conti, Puerto Madryn; Chubut, Argentina
- Capacity: 15,000
- Chairman: Mariano Eliceche
- Manager: Emanuel Trípodi
- League: Torneo Federal A
- 2023: Primera Nacional Zone A, 16th
Home colours	Away colours	Third colours

Club Social y Atlético Guillermo Brown, mostly known as Guillermo Brown or Brown de Puerto Madryn, is an Argentine sports club from Puerto Madryn in Chubut Province. The football team currently plays in the Torneo Federal A.

== History ==
The club was named in honour of Guillermo Brown who was the Irish-born first admiral of Argentina in the mid 19th Century.

Brown finished at the top of their group in the 2006 Clausura for the Torneo Argentino A, but failed in the next stage, after being defeated by San Martín de Tucumán in the playoff series with scores of 0–3 and 2–2.

On May 19, 2012, Brown achieved its greatest professional achievement in football, managing a 2–2 draw at Estadio Monumental with a last minute goal from Hernán Zanni against a River Plate squad with notable players such as David Trezeguet, Fernando Cavenaghi, Lucas Ocampos, and Alejandro Dominguez.

== Current squad ==
As of 24 July 2022

Note: Flags indicate national team as defined under FIFA eligibility rules; some limited exceptions apply. Players may hold more than one non-FIFA nationality.

No.	Pos.	Nation	Player
—	GK	ARG	Martín Perafán (loan from Quilmes)
—	GK	ARG	Facundo Perrone
—	DF	ARG	Agustín Pereyra
—	DF	ARG	Agustín Sandona
—	DF	ARG	Facundo Rodríguez
—	DF	ARG	Nicolás Herranz
—	DF	ARG	José Villegas
—	DF	ARG	Federico Mancinelli
—	DF	ARG	Gastón Benedetti (loan from Estudiantes)
—	DF	ARG	Juan Ignacio Rodríguez (loan from Banfield)
—	DF	ARG	Rodrigo González (on loan from Rosario Central)
—	MF	ARG	Cristian García
—	MF	ARG	Juan Silva

No.	Pos.	Nation	Player
—	MF	ARG	Ezequiel González (loan from Belgrano)
—	MF	ARG	Agustín Colazo (loan from Belgrano)
—	MF	ARG	Renso Pérez
—	MF	ARG	Esteban Obregón (loan from Estudiantes)
—	MF	ARG	Martín Rolle
—	MF	URU	Gabriel Navarro
—	FW	ARG	Mauro Fernández
—	FW	ARG	Franco Torres (loan from Gimnasia LP)
—	FW	ARG	Sergio González
—	FW	ARG	Flavio Ciampichetti
—	FW	ARG	Gonzalo Urquijo
—	FW	ARG	Santiago Gómez

=== Out on loan ===
Note: Flags indicate national team as defined under FIFA eligibility rules; some limited exceptions apply. Players may hold more than one non-FIFA nationality.

No.	Pos.	Nation	Player
—	MF	ARG	Sebastián Medina (at Patronato until 31 December 2022)
—	FW	ARG	Samuel Hernández (at Juventud Antoniana until 31 December 2022)

== Titles ==
- Torneo Argentino A: 2

Clausura 2007, 2010–11

- Torneo Argentino B: 1

2002–03

- Liga del Valle: 13

Regional 1947, Oficial 1954, Preparación 1962, Preparación 1963, Preparación 1967, Oficial 1967,
Apertura 1996, Clausura 1999, Clausura 2000, Apertura 2001, Clausura 2002, Apertura 2005, Apertura 2013
