= 2019–20 Estudiantes de La Plata season =

Estudiantes
2019–20 season
- President: Juan Sebastián Verón
- Manager: Gabriel Milito
- Stadium: Estadio Ciudad de La Plata
- Top goalscorer: League: Jonathan Schunke (1); Ángel González; Diego García; Enzo Kalinski; Federico González; All: Federico González (2)

The 2019–20 season is Estudiantes' 26th consecutive season in the top division of Argentine football. In addition to the Primera División, the club are competing in the Copa Argentina and Copa de la Superliga.

The season generally covers the period from 1 July 2019 to 30 June 2020.

== Review ==
=== Pre-season ===
Three players agreed departures from Estudiantes in June 2019, with Ezequiel Miranda heading to Deportivo Paraguayo while Nicolás Talpone and Fernando Evangelista joined Atlanta and Aldosivi respectively. Daniel Sappa and Gastón Gil Romero were both loaned out, to Arsenal de Sarandí and Aldosivi, on 24 June - the former having an optional six-month recall clause. Carlo Lattanzio completed a loan move to Estudiantes' Caseros namesakes on 27 June. On that same day, the club announced a transfer agreement had been reached with Godoy Cruz for midfielder Ángel González; subject to contract terms and a medical. After terminating his deal, Emiliano Ozuna left for Mexico's Celaya on 27 June. They beat and drew with their reserves in 29 June friendlies.

Numerous players who had loan stints out last season, including Gastón Campi and Juan Cascini, returned on and around 30 June. Federico González was signed from recently relegated Tigre on 2 July, having had a relegation clause in his contract. A scheduled friendly with Estrella de Berisso for 10 July was cancelled on 2 July, with Cambaceres visiting City Bell instead. Ignacio Bailone joined Chacarita Juniors on 3 July, while Matías Ruíz Díaz was loaned out to Guillermo Brown on 4 July. Ángel González's transaction from Godoy Cruz was confirmed on 6 July, the same date that they beat Uruguay's Fénix in pre-season friendlies. Days later they went six exhibition matches undefeated after a 2–0 win and a 0–0 draw with Cambaceres of Primera D Metropolitana.

Estudiantes, on 12 July, revealed an agreement with Boston River for the transfer of Diego García; subject to a medical and personal terms. They drew in a friendly with San Lorenzo on 13 July, which was followed by a 3–2 loss later in the day. García's incoming was made official on 15 July. Nahuel Luna went on loan to Villa San Carlos on the same day. Estudiantes gave Gastón Campi permission, on 15 July, to travel to Turkey to finalize a move to Trabzonspor. Young defender Juan Ignacio Saborido left for Villa San Carlos on 16 July. Campi formally departed for Trabzonspor on 19 July.

=== July ===
Estudiantes played their first official fixture of 2019–20 on 20 July, subsequently eliminating Primera B Nacional's Mitre from the Copa Argentina after netting two unanswered goals at the Estadio Coloso del Ruca Quimey in Cutral Có. Matías Pellegrini, who had scored in the aforementioned cup tie, agreed terms for a departure on 23 July as the left midfielder penned a deal with new Major League Soccer franchise Inter Miami. However, he was loaned back to Estudiantes until the year's end. An incoming was confirmed on 24 July in Chilean Juan Fuentes from O'Higgins. A goal from Jonathan Schunke won Estudiantes the points in their league opener against Aldosivi on 28 July. On 30 July, Estudiantes revealed Nicolás Bazzana would go to Aldosivi on loan; subject to a medical.

Nicolás Bazzana's move to Aldosivi was officially completed on 31 July.

=== August ===
Mauricio Vera joined Guillermo Brown on 2 August. Estudiantes suffered a defeat on matchday two in the Primera División, as Banfield narrowly beat them at the Estadio Florencio Sola on 4 August. Two days later, goals from Mateo Retegui and Francisco Apaolaza helped them beat their academy in an exhibition match; intended for the players who didn't feature against Banfield. Estudiantes met Cambaceres in a friendly for the third time in 2019–20 on 10 August, with Ángel González netting in a 2–0 win; as he did on 10 July. Instituto loaned Francisco Apaolaza from Estudiantes on 15 August. Bautista Cejas signed for Quilmes on 17 August. Estudiantes took their points tally to six on 19 August, as they scored three at the Estadio Ciudad de La Plata in a win over Independiente.

Despite winning back-to-back at home in the Primera División, Estudiantes didn't win in two away games after allowing Godoy Cruz to gain their first victory of the season on 25 August. Estudiantes lost for the third time in four fixtures on 30 August, as Lucas Robertone's goal condemned them to defeat versus Vélez Sarsfield.

=== September ===
Juan Cascini terminated his contract with Estudiantes on 2 September.

== Squad ==
Squad No.	Nationality	Name	Position(s)	Date of Birth (age)	Signed from
Goalkeepers
1	Argentina	Jerónimo Pourtau	GK	23 January 2000 (age 26)	Academy
12	Argentina	Emiliano González	GK	29 May 1998 (age 28)	Academy
21	Argentina	Mariano Andújar	GK	30 July 1983 (age 43)	Napoli
Defenders
3	Argentina	Iván Erquiaga	LB	26 March 1998 (age 28)	Academy
5	Argentina	Facundo Mura	RB	23 March 1999 (age 27)	Academy
6	Argentina	Jonathan Schunke	CB	22 February 1987 (age 39)	Ferro Carril Oeste
15	Argentina	Nazareno Colombo	CB	20 March 1999 (age 27)	Academy
18	Chile	Gonzalo Jara	CB	29 August 1985 (age 41)	Universidad de Chile
26	Argentina	Juan Ignacio Díaz	LB	26 May 1998 (age 28)	Academy
29	Argentina	Mauricio Rosales	RB	10 March 1992 (age 34)	Academy
30	Chile	Juan Fuentes	CB	21 March 1995 (age 31)	O'Higgins
Midfielders
4	Argentina	Iván Gómez	CM	28 February 1997 (age 29)	Academy
7	Argentina	Matías Pellegrini	LM	11 March 2000 (age 26)	Inter Miami (loan)
8	Argentina	Ángel González	RM	16 May 1994 (age 32)	Godoy Cruz
11	Argentina	Franco Sivetti	DM	30 May 1998 (age 28)	Academy
14	Argentina	Facundo Sánchez	RM	7 March 1990 (age 36)	Tigre
17	Uruguay	Manuel Castro	RW	27 September 1995 (age 31)	Montevideo Wanderers
20	Uruguay	Diego García	AM	29 December 1996 (age 29)	Boston River
22	Argentina	David Ayala	MF	26 July 2002 (age 24)	Academy
23	Argentina	Enzo Kalinski	CM	10 March 1987 (age 39)	Banfield
24	Argentina	Nahuel Estévez	AM	14 November 1995 (age 30)	Comunicaciones
25	Argentina	Andrés Ayala	DM	13 March 2000 (age 26)	Academy
26	Argentina	Darío Sarmiento	MF	29 March 2003 (age 23)	Academy
	Argentina	Leonardo Areal	MF	13 December 1996 (age 29)	Academy
Forwards
9	Argentina	Federico González	CF	6 January 1987 (age 39)	Tigre
10	Argentina	Gastón Fernández	RW	12 October 1983 (age 43)	Grêmio
19	Argentina	Mateo Retegui	CF	29 April 1999 (age 27)	Boca Juniors (loan)
28	Colombia	Edwar López	CF	9 March 1995 (age 31)	Atlético Huila
	Argentina	Mariano Pavone	CF	27 May 1982 (age 44)	Vélez Sarsfield
Out on loan					Loaned to
2	Argentina	Nicolás Bazzana	CB	23 February 1996 (age 30)	Aldosivi
16	Argentina	Francisco Apaolaza	CF	19 June 1997 (age 29)	Instituto
	Argentina	Gastón Gil Romero	CM	6 May 1993 (age 33)	Aldosivi
	Argentina	Carlo Lattanzio	LW	25 July 1997 (age 29)	Estudiantes (BA)
	Argentina	Nahuel Luna	FW	14 February 1996 (age 30)	Villa San Carlos
	Argentina	Lucas Rodríguez	LM	27 April 1997 (age 29)	D.C. United
	Argentina	Matías Ruíz Díaz	RB	9 September 1996 (age 30)	Guillermo Brown
	Argentina	Daniel Sappa	GK	9 February 1995 (age 31)	Arsenal de Sarandí
	Argentina	Mauricio Vera	AM	8 May 1997 (age 29)	Guillermo Brown
	Argentina	Fernando Zuqui	RM	27 November 1991 (age 34)	Colón

== Transfers ==
Domestic transfer windows:
3 July 2019 to 24 September 2019
20 January 2020 to 19 February 2020.

=== Transfers in ===
Date from	Position	Nationality	Name	From	Ref.
3 July 2019 (Note: Deal agreed on 2 July 2019)	CF	Argentina	Federico González	Tigre	
6 July 2019	RM	Argentina	Ángel González	Godoy Cruz	
15 July 2019	AM	Uruguay	Diego García	Boston River	
24 July 2019	CB	Chile	Juan Fuentes	O'Higgins	

=== Transfers out ===
Date from	Position	Nationality	Name	To	Ref.
27 June 2019	LM	Argentina	Emiliano Ozuna	Celaya	
3 July 2019 (Note: Deal agreed on 4 June 2019)	FW	Argentina	Ezequiel Miranda	Deportivo Paraguayo	
3 July 2019 (Note: Deal agreed on 12 June 2019)	AM	Argentina	Nicolás Talpone	Atlanta	
3 July 2019 (Note: Deal agreed on 14 June 2019)	LB	Argentina	Fernando Evangelista	Aldosivi	
3 July 2019	LB	Argentina	Ignacio Bailone	Chacarita Juniors	
16 July 2019	DF	Argentina	Juan Ignacio Saborido	Villa San Carlos	
19 July 2019	CB	Argentina	Gastón Campi	Trabzonspor	
23 July 2019	LM	Argentina	Matías Pellegrini	Inter Miami	
17 August 2019	LW	Argentina	Bautista Cejas	Quilmes	
2 September 2019	CM	Argentina	Juan Cascini	Released	

=== Loans in ===
Start date	Position	Nationality	Name	From	End date	Ref.
23 July 2019	LM	Argentina	Matías Pellegrini	Inter Miami	31 December 2019	

=== Loans out ===
Start date	Position	Nationality	Name	To	End date	Ref.
3 July 2019 (Note: Deal agreed on 24 June 2019)	GK	Argentina	Daniel Sappa	Arsenal de Sarandí	30 June 2020	
3 July 2019 (Note: Deal agreed on 24 June 2019)	CM	Argentina	Gastón Gil Romero	Aldosivi	30 June 2020	
3 July 2019 (Note: Deal agreed on 27 June 2019)	LW	Argentina	Carlo Lattanzio	Estudiantes (BA)	30 June 2020	
4 July 2019	RB	Argentina	Matías Ruíz Díaz	Guillermo Brown	30 June 2020	
15 July 2019	FW	Argentina	Nahuel Luna	Villa San Carlos	30 June 2020	
31 July 2019	CB	Argentina	Nicolás Bazzana	Aldosivi	30 June 2020	
2 August 2019	AM	Argentina	Mauricio Vera	Guillermo Brown	30 June 2020	
15 August 2019	CF	Argentina	Francisco Apaolaza	Instituto	30 June 2020	

== Friendlies ==
=== Pre-season ===
On 22 June 2019, Estudiantes confirmed pre-season friendlies with Estudiantes Reserves (29 June), Estrella de Berisso (10 July) and San Lorenzo (13 July); with a fourth opponent (6 July) to be revealed; later announced as Uruguay's Fénix. All fixtures were originally scheduled at the Country Club in City Bell, though the San Lorenzo and Fénix encounters were moved to the Estadio Pedro Bidegain in Buenos Aires and the Estadio Ciudad de La Plata in La Plata. The friendly with Estrella de Berisso was cancelled on 2 July, with an encounter against Cambaceres being set in its place. A match in City Bell with Temperley was also scheduled for 13 July, though was later cancelled due to bad weather.

Win Draw Loss

29 June 2019 Friendly	Estudiantes	0–0	Estudiantes Reserves	City Bell, Argentina
		Estudiantes; Infocielo; 40 min. match		Stadium: Country Club

29 June 2019 Friendly	Estudiantes	2–0	Estudiantes Reserves	City Bell, Argentina
	E. López	Estudiantes; Infocielo; 40 min. match		Stadium: Country Club

6 July 2019 Friendly	Estudiantes	3–1	Fénix	La Plata, Argentina
	M. Pellegrini 13'; J. Schunke 23'; M. Retegui 33'	Estudiantes; Infocielo; 50 min. match	E. Mozzone 12'	Stadium: Estadio Ciudad de La Plata

6 July 2019 Friendly	Estudiantes	2–1	Fénix	La Plata, Argentina
	M. Castro 14', 43'	Estudiantes; Diario El Día; 50 min. match	I. Pereira 39'	Stadium: Estadio Ciudad de La Plata

10 July 2019 Friendly	Estudiantes	Cancelled	Estrella de Berisso	City Bell, Argentina
		Estudiantes		Stadium: Country Club

10 July 2019 Friendly	Estudiantes	2–0	Cambaceres	City Bell, Argentina
10:00 GMT-3	F. González 14'; Á. González 20'	Estudiantes; Diagonales; 40 min. match		Stadium: Country Club; Referee: Martín Giampaolo (Argentina)

10 July 2019 Friendly	Estudiantes	0–0	Cambaceres	City Bell, Argentina
		Estudiantes; Diagonales; 40 min. match		Stadium: Country Club; Referee: Martín Giampaolo (Argentina)

13 July 2019 Friendly	Estudiantes	Cancelled	Temperley	City Bell, Argentina
		Temperley		Stadium: Country Club

13 July 2019 Friendly	San Lorenzo	0–0	Estudiantes	Buenos Aires, Argentina
		Estudiantes; AS		Stadium: Estadio Pedro Bidegain; Referee: Francisco López (Argentina)

13 July 2019 Friendly	San Lorenzo	3–2	Estudiantes	Buenos Aires, Argentina
	M. Pittón 3'; N. Barrios 15'; N. Reniero 45'	Estudiantes; AS; 60 min. match	N. Estévez 30+3'; D. García 57'	Stadium: Estadio Pedro Bidegain; Referee: Francisco López (Argentina)

=== Mid-season ===
After facing their academy on 6 August, Estudiantes would then play Cambaceres in a friendly, as they did in July, on 10 August.

Win Draw Loss

6 August 2019 Friendly	Estudiantes	2–0	Estudiantes Academy	City Bell, Argentina
	M. Retegui; F. Apaolaza			Stadium: Country Club

10 August 2019 Friendly	Estudiantes	2–0	Cambaceres	City Bell, Argentina
10:00 GMT-3	N. Colombo 10'; Á. González 28'	Estudiantes; El Día; 60 min. match		Stadium: Country Club; Referee: Tomás Diulio (Argentina)

== Competitions ==
=== Primera División ===
==== League table ====
Pos	Team	Pld	W	D	L	GF	GA	GD	Pts
11	Arsenal	23	9	7	7	37	32	+5	34
12	Talleres (C)	23	10	4	9	34	30	+4	34
13	Estudiantes (LP)	23	8	6	9	23	22	+1	30
14	Independiente	23	8	5	10	27	25	+2	29
15	Atlético Tucumán	23	7	8	8	22	25	−3	29

Source: AFA
Rules for classification: 1) points; 2) play-off (only if needed to decide championship); 3) goal difference; 4) goals scored; 5) head-to-head points; 6) head-to-head goal difference; 7) head-to-head goals scored.

==== Relegation table ====
Pos	Team	2017–18 Pts	2018–19 Pts	2019–20 Pts	Total Pts	Total Pld	Avg	Relegation
14	Lanús	29	34	10	73	57	1.281	
15	Argentinos Juniors	41	22	9	72	57	1.263	
16	Estudiantes (LP)	36	29	6	71	57	1.246	
17	Aldosivi	—	33	4	37	30	1.233	
18	Patronato	33	26	10	69	57	1.211	

Source: AFA

==== Results summary ====
Overall								Home						Away					
Pld	W	D	L	GF	GA	GD	Pts	W	D	L	GF	GA	GD	W	D	L	GF	GA	GD
5	2	0	3	5	4	+1	6	2	0	1	4	1	+3	0	0	2	1	3	−2

Last updated: 31 August 2019.
Source: Soccerway

==== Matches ====
The fixtures for the 2019–20 campaign were released on 10 July.

Win Draw Loss

28 July 2019 1	Estudiantes	1–0	Aldosivi	La Plata, Argentina
11:00 GMT-3	J. Schunke 44'	Estudiantes; Infobae; Soccerway		Stadium: Estadio Ciudad de La Plata; Referee: Fernando Espinoza (Argentina)

4 August 2019 2	Banfield	1–0	Estudiantes	Banfield, Argentina
15:30 GMT-3	N. Bertolo 45' (pen.)	Banfield; Infobae; Soccerway		Stadium: Estadio Florencio Sola; Referee: Nazareno Arasa (Argentina)

19 August 2019 3	Estudiantes	3–0	Independiente	La Plata, Argentina
20:00 GMT-3	A. González 47'; D. García 72'; E. Kalinski 83'	Estudiantes; Infobae; Soccerway		Stadium: Estadio Ciudad de La Plata; Referee: Néstor Pitana (Argentina)

25 August 2019 4	Godoy Cruz	2–1	Estudiantes	Mendoza, Argentina
11:00 GMT-3	S. García 57'; F. Henríquez 65'	Estudiantes; Infobae; Soccerway	F. González 14'	Stadium: Estadio Malvinas Argentinas; Referee: Pablo Echavarría (Argentina)

30 August 2019 5	Estudiantes	0–1	Vélez Sarsfield	La Plata, Argentina
21:10 GMT-3		Estudiantes; Infobae; Soccerway	L. Robertone 6'	Stadium: Estadio Ciudad de La Plata; Referee: Patricio Loustau (Argentina)

6	Boca Juniors	–	Estudiantes	Buenos Aires, Argentina
				Stadium: La Bombonera

=== Copa Argentina ===
The Estadio Coloso del Ruca Quimey in Cutral Có would serve as the setting for Estudiantes' round of thirty-two tie in the Copa Argentina against Mitre - at Alianza's home venue, therefore neutral for both sides on 20 July - as is customary.

Win Draw Loss

20 July 2019 R32	Mitre	0–2	Estudiantes	Cutral Có, Argentina
13:10 GMT-3		Estudiantes; Infobae; Soccerway	M. Pellegrini; F. González	Stadium: Estadio Coloso del Ruca Quimey; Referee: Jorge Baliño (Argentina)

=== Copa de la Superliga ===
Win Draw Loss

	–
00:00 GMT-3

== Squad statistics ==
=== Appearances and goals ===
No.	Pos.	Nationality	Name	League		Cup		League Cup		Continental		Total		Discipline		Ref
No.	Pos.	Nationality	Name	Apps	Goals	Apps	Goals	Apps	Goals	Apps	Goals	Apps	Goals	Yellow card	Red card	Ref
1	GK	Argentina	Jerónimo Pourtau	0	0	0	0	0	0	—		0	0	0	0	
2	CB	Argentina	Nicolás Bazzana	0	0	0	0	0	0	—		0	0	0	0	
3	LB	Argentina	Iván Erquiaga	1	0	1	0	0	0	—		2	0	0	0	
4	CM	Argentina	Iván Gómez	4	0	1	0	0	0	—		5	0	0	0	
5	RB	Argentina	Facundo Mura	3	0	0	0	0	0	—		3	0	1	0	
6	CB	Argentina	Jonathan Schunke	5	0	1	0	0	0	—		6	0	1	0	
7	LM	Argentina	Matías Pellegrini	1	0	1	1	0	0	—		2	1	0	0	
8	RM	Argentina	Ángel González	5	1	1	0	0	0	—		6	1	1	0	
9	CF	Argentina	Federico González	5	1	1	1	0	0	—		6	2	1	0	
10	RW	Argentina	Gastón Fernández	0(3)	0	0(1)	0	0	0	—		0(4)	0	0	0	
11	DM	Argentina	Franco Sivetti	0	0	0	0	0	0	—		0	0	0	0	
12	GK	Argentina	Emiliano González	0	0	0	0	0	0	—		0	0	0	0	
14	RM	Argentina	Facundo Sánchez	5	0	1	0	0	0	—		6	0	0	0	
15	CB	Argentina	Nazareno Colombo	1(2)	0	1	0	0	0	—		2(2)	0	2	0	
16	CF	Argentina	Francisco Apaolaza	0	0	0	0	0	0	—		0	0	0	0	
17	RW	Uruguay	Manuel Castro	3(2)	0	0(1)	0	0	0	—		3(3)	0	0	0	
18	CB	Chile	Gonzalo Jara	3	0	0	0	0	0	—		3	0	1	0	
19	CF	Argentina	Mateo Retegui	0(1)	0	0	0	0	0	—		0(1)	0	0	0	
20	CM	Uruguay	Diego García	3(2)	1	0(1)	0	0	0	—		3(3)	1	0	0	
21	GK	Argentina	Mariano Andújar	5	0	1	0	0	0	—		6	0	1	0	
22	MF	Argentina	David Ayala	0	0	0	0	0	0	—		0	0	0	0	
23	CM	Argentina	Enzo Kalinski	5	1	0	0	0	0	—		5	1	2	0	
24	AM	Argentina	Nahuel Estévez	3(2)	0	1	0	0	0	—		4(2)	0	1	0	
25	DM	Argentina	Andrés Ayala	0	0	0	0	0	0	—		0	0	0	0	
26	MF	Argentina	Darío Sarmiento	0	0	0	0	0	0	—		0	0	0	0	
28	CF	Colombia	Edwar López	0(2)	0	1	0	0	0	—		1(2)	0	0	0	
29	RB	Argentina	Mauricio Rosales	1	0	0	0	0	0	—		1	0	0	0	
30	AM	Chile	Juan Fuentes	2(1)	0	0	0	0	0	—		2(1)	0	0	0	
–	MF	Argentina	Leonardo Areal	0	0	0	0	0	0	—		0	0	0	0	
–	LB	Argentina	Juan Ignacio Díaz	0	0	0	0	0	0	—		0	0	0	0	
–	CM	Argentina	Gastón Gil Romero	0	0	0	0	0	0	—		0	0	0	0	
–	LW	Argentina	Carlo Lattanzio	0	0	0	0	0	0	—		0	0	0	0	
–	FW	Argentina	Nahuel Luna	0	0	0	0	0	0	—		0	0	0	0	
–	CF	Argentina	Mariano Pavone	0	0	0	0	0	0	—		0	0	0	0	
–	LM	Argentina	Lucas Rodríguez	0	0	0	0	0	0	—		0	0	0	0	
–	RB	Argentina	Matías Ruíz Díaz	0	0	0	0	0	0	—		0	0	0	0	
–	GK	Argentina	Daniel Sappa	0	0	0	0	0	0	—		0	0	0	0	
–	AM	Argentina	Mauricio Vera	0	0	0	0	0	0	—		0	0	0	0	
–	RM	Argentina	Fernando Zuqui	0	0	0	0	0	0	—		0	0	0	0	
Own goals				—	0	—	0	—	0	—		—	0	—	—	—
Players who left during the season
–	LW	Argentina	Bautista Cejas	0	0	0	0	0	0	—		0	0	0	0	
–	CM	Argentina	Juan Cascini	0	0	0	0	0	0	—		0	0	0	0	

Statistics accurate as of 31 August 2019.

=== Goalscorers ===
Rank	Pos	No.	Nat	Name	League	Cup	League Cup	Continental	Total	Ref
1	CF	9	Argentina	Federico González	1	1	0	—	2	
2	LM	8	Argentina	Matías Pellegrini	0	1	0	—	1	
2	CB	6	Argentina	Jonathan Schunke	1	0	0	—	1	
2	RM	8	Argentina	Ángel González	1	0	0	—	1	
2	AM	20	Uruguay	Diego García	1	0	0	—	1	
2	CM	23	Argentina	Enzo Kalinski	1	0	0	—	1	
Own goals					0	0	0	—	0	
Totals					5	2	0	—	7	—
