= Gaspar Di Pizio =

Argentine professional footballer

Personal information
- Full name: Gaspar Di Pizio
- Date of birth: 23 February 2000 (age 26)
- Place of birth: La Plata, Argentina
- Height: 1.78 m (5 ft 10 in)
- Position: Centre-forward

Youth career
- Escuela El Potrero
- 2012–2020: Estudiantes

Senior career*
Years	Team	Apps	(Gls)
2020–2021	Estudiantes	6	(0)
2021	→ Barnechea (loan)	18	(1)
2022	Juan Aurich	7	(0)
2023	San Lorenzo VC	3	(2)
- * Club domestic league appearances and goals as of 13:01, 23 November 2020 (UTC)

Gaspar Di Pizio (born 23 February 2000) is an Argentine professional footballer who plays as a centre-forward.

== Career ==
Di Pizio started out at Escuela de El Potrero, before signing with Estudiantes at the end of 2012. Eight years later, in 2020, he was promoted into their first-team under caretaker manager Leandro Desábato. Di Pizio made his senior debut on 22 November 2020 in a Copa de la Liga Profesional home defeat to Aldosivi, as he replaced Darío Sarmiento with twenty-six minutes remaining.

In 2022, Di Pizio moved to Peru and joined Juan Aurich.

== Career statistics ==
As of 23 November 2020.

Appearances and goals by club, season and competition
Club	Season	League			Cup		League Cup		Continental		Other		Total	
Club	Season	Division	Apps	Goals	Apps	Goals	Apps	Goals	Apps	Goals	Apps	Goals	Apps	Goals
Estudiantes	2020–21 (Note: Soccerway counts Copa de la Liga Profesional appearances as league appearances.)	Primera División	1	0	0	0	0	0	—		0	0	1	0
Career total			1	0	0	0	0	0	—		0	0	1	0
