= Francisco Apaolaza =

Argentine footballer

Personal information
- Full name: Juan Francisco Apaolaza
- Date of birth: 19 June 1997 (age 29)
- Place of birth: Magdalena, Argentina
- Height: 1.86 m (6 ft 1 in)
- Position: Forward

Team information
- Current team: Carabobo
- Number: 9

Youth career
- 2012–2018: Estudiantes

Senior career*
Years	Team	Apps	(Gls)
2018–2022	Estudiantes	45	(6)
2019	→ Patronato (loan)	2	(0)
2019–2020	→ Instituto (loan)	13	(1)
2020	→ Atenas (loan)	3	(1)
2022	→ Arsenal Sarandí (loan)	27	(1)
2023–	Carabobo	28	(4)
- * Club domestic league appearances and goals as of 19:21, 6 June 2023 (UTC)

Juan Francisco Apaolaza (born 19 June 1997) is an Argentine professional footballer who plays as a forward for Carabobo.

== Career ==
After joining the Estudiantes system in 2012, Apaolaza was promoted into their first-team squad in April 2018. He made his professional debut on 21 April during a home defeat to Belgrano in the Primera División, which preceded him signing a contract until June 2020 on 4 May. Three months later, Apaolaza scored the first goal of his senior career in a Copa Libertadores encounter with Gremio. On 18 January 2019, having scored twice in seventeen matches in 2018–19, Apaolaza was loaned to Patronato. He appeared thrice. In August 2019, Apaolaza headed to Instituto on loan. He scored one goal, versus Villa Dálmine.

In October 2020, Apaolaza headed to Uruguay with Atenas. He made three Segunda División appearances for the club, notably netting in his sole home match on 23 October against Albion. He returned to Estudiantes on 16 December.

At the end of January 2022, Apaolaza joined Arsenal de Sarandí on loan for the rest of the year. In January 2023, Apaolaza joined Venezuelan club Carabobo.

== Career statistics ==
As of 3 January 2021.

Club statistics
Club	Season	League			Cup		League Cup		Continental		Other		Total	
Club	Season	Division	Apps	Goals	Apps	Goals	Apps	Goals	Apps	Goals	Apps	Goals	Apps	Goals
Estudiantes	2017–18	Primera División	3	0	0	0	—		0	0	0	0	3	0
Estudiantes	2018–19	Primera División	12	1	3	0	0	0	2 (Note: Appearance(s) in the Copa Sudamericana)	1	0	0	17	2
Estudiantes	2019–20	Primera División	0	0	0	0	0	0	—		0	0	0	0
Estudiantes	Total		15	1	3	0	0	0	2	1	0	0	20	2
Patronato (loan)	2018–19	Primera División	2	0	0	0	1	0	—		0	0	3	0
Instituto (loan)	2019–20	Primera B Nacional	13	1	0	0	—		—		0	0	13	1
Atenas (loan)	2020	Segunda División	3	1	0	0	—		—		0	0	3	1
Career total			33	3	3	0	1	0	2	1	0	0	39	4
