= Christian Alemán =

Ecuadorian footballer (born 1996)

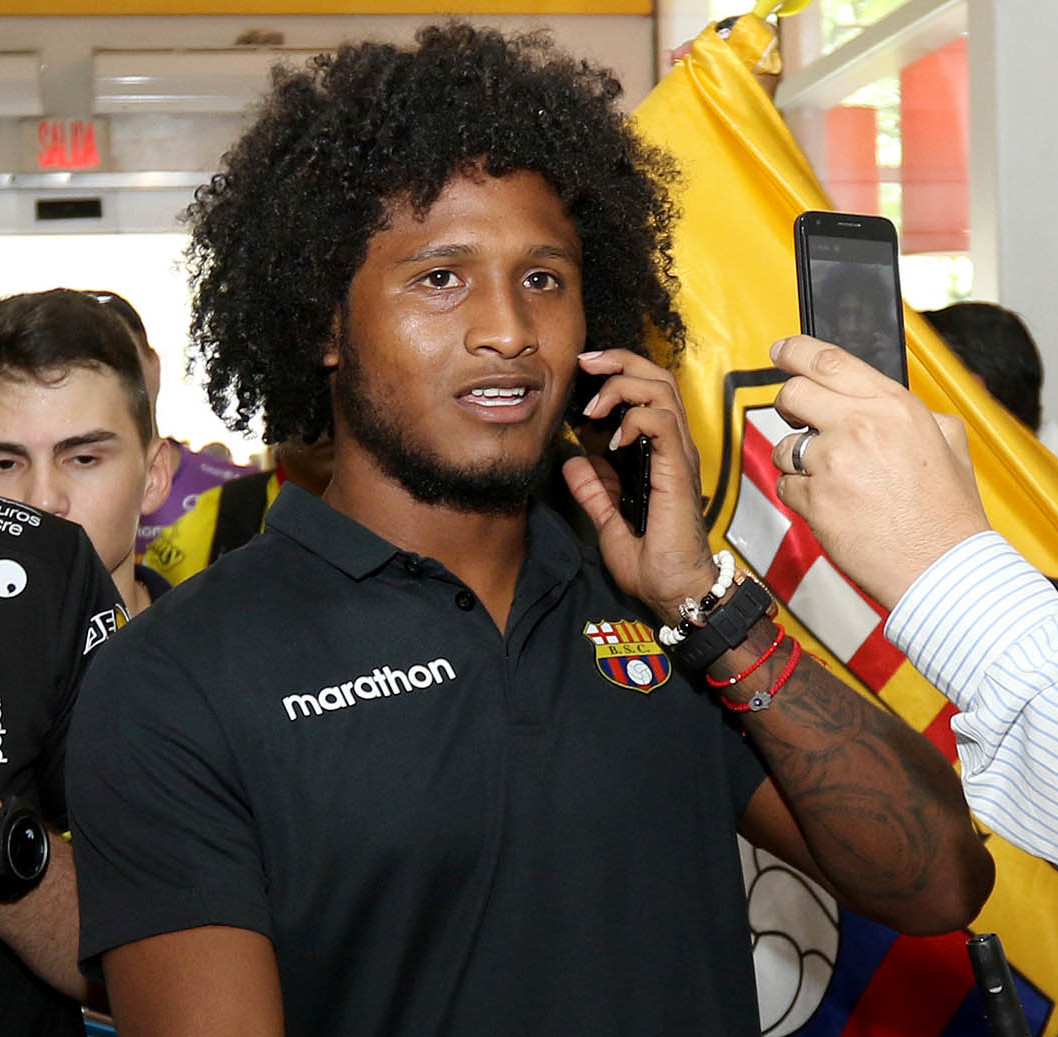

Personal information
- Full name: Christian Fernando Alemán Alegría
- Date of birth: 5 February 1996 (age 30)
- Place of birth: Guayaquil, Ecuador
- Height: 1.70 m (5 ft 7 in)
- Position: Attacking midfielder

Youth career
- 2001–2013: Emelec

Senior career*
Years	Team	Apps	(Gls)
2013–2014	Emelec	11	(0)
2015	Técnico Universitario	4	(0)
2015	→ Manta (loan)	14	(5)
2016	Deportivo Quito	16	(9)
2016–2020	Barcelona SC	63	(10)
2017–2018	→ Estudiantes (loan)	4	(1)
2020	Guayaquil City	9	(0)
2021–2022	Arka Gdynia	55	(7)
2023	Aucas	1	(0)
2023–2024	GKS Katowice	15	(1)
2024–2025	Manta	42	(11)
2026	Bolívar	2	(0)
- * Club domestic league appearances and goals as of 23:11, 20 June 2026 (UTC)

Christian Fernando Alemán Alegría (born 5 February 1996) is an Ecuadorian professional footballer who plays as an attacking midfielder.

== Career ==
Emelec were Alemán's first club, he joined their youth system at the age of 5 and went on to play senior football for them from 2013 to 2014 and made eleven appearances in the Ecuadorian Serie A. His senior debut for Emelec arrived on 19 June 2013 against Manta, a team he would go on to join in July 2015. Prior to joining Manta, Alemán signed for Técnico Universitario of the Ecuadorian Serie B. He featured four times before leaving for Manta, also of Serie B. For Manta, he scored five goals, including two in an 8–0 win over Deportivo Azogues on 28 November, in fourteen games as they finished 6th.

January 2016 saw him join Deportivo Quito in Serie B, but he left eight months later to play for Ecuadorian Serie A team Barcelona SC. He made his Barcelona debut on 21 August 2016 in a 5–1 victory over Fuerza Amarilla. Twenty-one further appearances came during 2016 and 2017, before Alemán departed Ecuadorian football for the first time to move to Argentine Primera División side Estudiantes. He scored on his debut for Estudiantes, netting the winning goal against Arsenal de Sarandí on 28 August 2017. He left after six appearances in June 2018, subsequently scoring ten goals in three seasons back with Barcelona.

In September 2020, Alemán headed to fellow Ecuadorian Serie A club Guayaquil City. Nine appearances followed. On 20 December 2020, Alemán agreed a free transfer to Poland with I liga side Arka Gdynia; with his one-and-a-half-year contract commencing in January 2021.

On 21 December 2022, it was announced he would return to Ecuador to join the 2022 season champions Aucas in 2023. After making only three appearances across all competitions in nine months, Alemán left Aucas in early September 2023.

Shortly after, Alemán returned to Poland, and on 20 September he signed a one-year contract with an option for another season with second division side GKS Katowice. Alemán scored once in 15 league appearances as GKS won promotion to the Ekstraklasa after finishing the season as runners-up. On 17 June 2024, it was announced Alemán would leave GKS at the end of his contract.

On 5 August 2024, he re-joined Ecuadorian Serie B club Manta.

== Personal life ==
Alemán is the half-brother of fellow footballer Javier Charcopa.

== Career statistics ==
As of 28 May 2024

Appearances and goals by club, season and competition
Club	Season	League			National cup (Note: Includes Polish Cup)		League cup		Continental		Other		Total	
Club	Season	Division	Apps	Goals	Apps	Goals	Apps	Goals	Apps	Goals	Apps	Goals	Apps	Goals
Emelec	2013	Serie A	10	0	—		—		0	0	0	0	10	0
Emelec	2014	Serie A	1	0	—		—		0	0	0	0	1	0
Emelec	Total		11	0	—		—		0	0	0	0	11	0
Técnico Universitario	2015	Serie B	4	0	—		—		—		0	0	4	0
Manta (loan)	2015	Serie B	14	5	—		—		—		0	0	14	5
Deportivo Quito	2016	Serie B	16	9	—		—		—		0	0	16	9
Barcelona SC	2016	Serie A	8	0	—		—		0	0	0	0	8	0
Barcelona SC	2017	Serie A	14	0	—		—		4 (Note: Appearance(s) in Copa Libertadores)	1	0	0	18	1
Barcelona SC	2018	Serie A	16	4	—		—		0	0	0	0	16	4
Barcelona SC	2019	Serie A	21	6	0	0	—		2	0	0	0	23	6
Barcelona SC	2020	Serie A	4	0	0	0	—		1	0	0	0	5	0
Barcelona SC	Total		63	10	0	0	—		7	1	0	0	70	11
Estudiantes (loan)	2017–18	Primera División	4	1	0	0	—		2 (Note: Appearance(s) in Copa Sudamericana)	0	0	0	6	1
Guayaquil City	2020	Serie A	9	0	0	0	—		—		0	0	9	0
Arka Gdynia	2020–21	I liga	14	1	2	0	—		—		—		16	1
Arka Gdynia	2021–22	I liga	30	6	3	1	—		—		—		33	7
Arka Gdynia	2022–23	I liga	11	0	1	0	—		—		—		12	0
Arka Gdynia	Total		55	7	6	1	—		—		—		61	8
Aucas	2023	Serie A	1	0	0	0	—		1	0	1 (Note: Appearance in Supercopa Ecuador)	0	3	0
GKS Katowice	2023–24	I liga	15	0	1	0	—		—		—		16	0
Manta	2024	Serie B	0	0	0	0	—		—		—		0	0
Career total			192	32	7	1	—		10	1	1	0	210	34

== Honours ==
Emelec

- Ecuadorian Serie A: 2013, 2014

Barcelona SC

- Ecuadorian Serie A: 2016
