= Darío Sarmiento =

Argentine footballer (born 2003)

Personal information
- Full name: Darío Ariel Sarmiento
- Date of birth: 29 March 2003 (age 23)
- Place of birth: Florencio Varela, Argentina
- Height: 1.67 m (5 ft 6 in)
- Position: Winger

Team information
- Current team: Colón (on loan from Tigre)

Youth career
- Defensores de Bosques
- Independiente
- 2009–2019: Estudiantes

Senior career*
Years	Team	Apps	(Gls)
2019–2021	Estudiantes	18	(0)
2021–2024	Manchester City	0	(0)
2021–2022	→ Girona (loan)	9	(0)
2022	→ Montevideo City Torque (loan)	0	(0)
2024–	Tigre	11	(0)
2025	→ RFC Liège (loan)	13	(1)
2026–	→ Colón (loan)	1	(0)

International career
	Argentina U16	6	(4)
- Argentina U17
2020–2022	Argentina U20		
- * Club domestic league appearances and goals as of 19:00, 20 March 2026 (UTC)

Darío Ariel Sarmiento (born 29 March 2003) is an Argentine professional footballer who plays as a winger for Colón, on loan from Tigre.

== Club career ==
=== Estudiantes ===
Sarmiento joined Estudiantes in 2009, after spells with Defensores de Bosques and Independiente. He made his debut in senior football at the age of sixteen, after manager Gabriel Milito promoted him into Estudiantes' first-team squad during the 2019–20 campaign. After going unused on the substitute's bench for Primera División fixtures with Patronato and Arsenal de Sarandí in September, Sarmiento's bow arrived on 5 October 2019 in a goalless draw at home to Huracán; replacing Diego García after sixty-seven minutes to become the club's second youngest debutant. Seven more appearances came in his breakthrough season.

On 31 December 2020, Estudiantes vice president Martín Gorostegui confirmed that transfer negotiations were underway with Premier League club Manchester City for Sarmiento, two days after the player had renewed his contract through to 31 December 2021.

=== Manchester City ===
On 30 April 2021, Estudiantes announced that Sarmiento would join Manchester City on 1 July, for a reported initial fee of £5.2million.

==== Girona (loan) ====
On 30 July 2021, Sarmiento was loaned to Spanish club Girona, also owned by the City Football Group, for one year.

==== Montevideo City Torque (loan) ====
In July 2022, Sarmiento was loaned to Uruguayan Primera División side Montevideo City Torque for six months. Because of injuries, he never played and returned to Manchester City for his rehabilitation.

=== Tigre ===
On 24 July 2024, he returned to Argentina, joining Tigre permanently, signing a contract until 2026.

==== RFC Liège (loan) ====
On 30 August 2025, Sarmiento was loaned to Challenger Pro League side RFC Liège for a year, with an option to buy.

==== Colón (loan) ====
In early 2026 he joined Primera Nacional club Colón on loan, making his debut on 16 March in a 1–0 win against Acassuso.

== International career ==
Sarmiento regularly featured for the Argentina U16s, including at the Montaigu Tournament and Torneo de Desarrollo; winning both competitions. He also appeared for the U17s under Pablo Aimar. In December 2020, Sarmiento received a call-up from the U20s.

== Career statistics ==
As of 24 January 2021.

Appearances and goals by club, season and competition
Club	Season	League			Cup		League Cup		Continental		Other		Total	
Club	Season	Division	Apps	Goals	Apps	Goals	Apps	Goals	Apps	Goals	Apps	Goals	Apps	Goals
Estudiantes	2019–20	Primera División	5	0	3	0	0	0	—		0	0	8	0
Estudiantes	2020–21 (Note: Soccerway counts Copa de la Liga Profesional appearances as league appearances.)	Primera División	9	0	0	0	1	0	—		0	0	10	0
Career total			14	0	3	0	1	0	—		0	0	18	0

== Honours ==
Argentina U16

- Montaigu Tournament: 2019
- Torneo de Desarrollo: 2019
