= 2017–18 Estudiantes de La Plata season =

Estudiantes de La Plata
2017–18 season
- Chairman: Juan Sebastián Verón
- Manager: Gustavo Matosas (until 19 September 2017); Leandro Benítez (int.) (from 19 September 2017 to 26 September 2017); Lucas Bernardi (from 26 September 2017)
- Stadium: Estadio Ciudad de La Plata
- Primera División: 13th
- Copa Argentina: Round of 64
- Copa Sudamericana: Round of 16
- Copa Libertadores: Group stage
- Top goalscorer: League: Two players (2); All: Mariano Pavone (3)

The 2017–18 season is Estudiantes de La Plata's 24th consecutive season in the top-flight of Argentine football. The season covers the period from 1 July 2017 to 30 June 2018.

== Current squad ==
As of 3 September 2017.

Note: Flags indicate national team as defined under FIFA eligibility rules; some limited exceptions apply. Players may hold more than one non-FIFA nationality.

No.	Pos.	Nation	Player
1	GK	ARG	Jerónimo Pourtau
2	DF	ARG	Leandro Desábato
3	DF	ARG	Lucas Diarte
4	DF	ARG	Iván Gómez
6	DF	ARG	Jonathan Schunke
7	FW	COL	Juan Ferney Otero
8	MF	ARG	Israel Damonte
10	MF	ARG	Lucas Rodríguez
12	GK	ARG	Daniel Sappa
14	MF	ARG	Facundo Sánchez
17	MF	ARG	Bautista Cejas
19	DF	ARG	Sebastián Dubarbier
21	GK	ARG	Mariano Andújar
22	MF	ARG	Rodrigo Braña
23	MF	ARG	Juan Perotti
25	FW	ARG	Ignacio Bailone

No.	Pos.	Nation	Player
26	FW	ARG	Elías Umere
27	FW	ARG	Facundo Quintana
28	MF	ARG	Bautista Cascini
31	DF	ARG	Nicolás Bazzana
32	MF	ARG	Nicolás Talpone
—	MF	ECU	Christian Alemán (on loan from Barcelona)
—	MF	ARG	Fernando Zuqui
—	MF	ARG	Gabriel Graciani
—	DF	ARG	Gastón Campi
—	FW	ARG	Gastón Fernández
—	FW	ARG	Lucas Melano (on loan from Portland Timbers)
—	FW	ARG	Marco Borgnino (on loan from Atlético de Rafaela)
—	FW	ARG	Mariano Pavone
—	DF	ARG	Matías Catalán (on loan from San Luis)
—	MF	ARG	Nahuel Estévez
—	FW	ARG	Pablo Lugüercio

=== Out on loan ===
Note: Flags indicate national team as defined under FIFA eligibility rules; some limited exceptions apply. Players may hold more than one non-FIFA nationality.

No.	Pos.	Nation	Player
—	MF	ARG	Emiliano Ozuna (at Temperley until 30 June 2018)
—	FW	ARG	Facundo Bruera (at Independiente Rivadavia until 30 June 2018)
—	DF	ARG	Julián Marchioni (at Patronato until 30 June 2018)

No.	Pos.	Nation	Player
—	DF	ARG	Mauricio Rosales (at Olimpo until 30 June 2018)
—	DF	ARG	Rodrigo Ayala (at Villa San Carlos until 30 June 2018)

== Transfers ==
=== In ===
Date	Pos.	Name	From	Fee
1 July 2017	DF	(Argentina) Gastón Campi	(Argentina) Racing Club	Undisclosed
1 July 2017	FW	(Argentina) Mariano Pavone	(Argentina) Vélez Sarsfield	Undisclosed
1 July 2017	FW	(Argentina) Pablo Lugüercio	(Argentina) Aldosivi	Undisclosed
20 July 2017	MF	(Argentina) Nahuel Estévez	(Argentina) Comunicaciones	Undisclosed
7 August 2017	FW	(Argentina) Gastón Fernández	(Brazil) Grêmio	Undisclosed
23 August 2017	MF	(Argentina) Fernando Zuqui	(Argentina) Boca Juniors	Undisclosed

=== Out ===
Date	Pos.	Name	To	Fee
5 July 2017	FW	(Argentina) Javier Toledo	(Argentina) Sol de América	Undisclosed
5 July 2017	DF	(Uruguay) Matías Aguirregaray	(Mexico) Tijuana	Undisclosed
6 July 2017	MF	(Argentina) David Barbona	(Argentina) Atlético Tucumán	Undisclosed
27 July 2017	MF	(Argentina) Leonardo Gil	(Argentina) Rosario Central	Undisclosed
4 August 2017	MF	(Argentina) Javier Iritier	(Argentina) Tigre	Undisclosed
9 August 2017	GK	(Argentina) Facundo Andújar	(Argentina) Deportivo Español	Undisclosed
13 August 2017	FW	(Argentina) Lucas Viatri	(Uruguay) Peñarol	Undisclosed
15 August 2017	DF	(Argentina) Luciano Vargas	(Argentina) Rivadavia	Undisclosed
21 August 2017	MF	(Argentina) Santiago Ascacíbar	(Germany) VfB Stuttgart	Undisclosed
29 August 2017	DF	(Argentina) Juan Foyth	(England) Tottenham Hotspur	Undisclosed
2 September 2017	GK	(Argentina) Nahuel Losada	(Argentina) All Boys	Undisclosed

=== Loan in ===
Date from	Date to	Pos.	Name	From
20 July 2017	30 June 2018	FW	(Argentina) Marco Borgnino	(Argentina) Atlético de Rafaela
27 July 2017	30 June 2018	FW	(Argentina) Lucas Melano	(United States) Portland Timbers
6 August 2017	30 June 2018	DF	(Argentina) Matías Catalán	(Mexico) San Luis
6 August 2017	30 June 2018	MF	(Ecuador) Christian Alemán	(Ecuador) Barcelona

=== Loan out ===
Date from	Date to	Pos.	Name	To
20 July 2017	30 June 2018	DF	(Argentina) Julián Marchioni	(Argentina) Patronato
31 July 2017	30 June 2018	DF	(Argentina) Rodrigo Ayala	(Argentina) Villa San Carlos
1 August 2017	30 June 2018	DF	(Argentina) Mauricio Rosales	(Argentina) Olimpo
28 August 2017	30 June 2018	FW	(Argentina) Facundo Bruera	(Argentina) Independiente Rivadavia

== Friendlies ==
Win Draw Loss

=== Pre-season ===
9 August 2017 Friendly	Peñarol (Uruguay)	0–0	(Argentina) Estudiantes	Montevideo, Uruguay
20:30		Report		Stadium: Estadio Campeón del Siglo

16 August 2017 Friendly	Estudiantes (Argentina)	0–0	(Argentina) Vélez Sarsfield	La Plata, Argentina
		Report		Stadium: Estadio Ciudad de La Plata

16 August 2017 Friendly	Estudiantes (Argentina)	1–0	(Argentina) Vélez Sarsfield	La Plata, Argentina
	J. Otero	Report		Stadium: Estadio Ciudad de La Plata

=== Mid-season ===
2 September 2017 Friendly	Estudiantes (Argentina)	2–0	(Argentina) Temperley	La Plata, Argentina
	M. Pavone 34'; C. Alemán	Report		Stadium: City Bell Country Club

2 September 2017 Friendly	Estudiantes (Argentina)	5–1	(Argentina) Temperley	La Plata, Argentina
	L. Melano 27', 38'; J. Otero 37'; M. Borgnino 47'; B. Cejas 61'	Report	Goal	Stadium: City Bell Country Club

== Primera División ==
=== League table ===
Pos	Team	Pld	W	D	L	GF	GA	GD	Pts
14	Vélez Sarsfield	27	10	8	9	31	32	−1	38
15	Atlético Tucumán	27	8	12	7	29	26	+3	36
16	Estudiantes (LP)	27	10	6	11	25	26	−1	36
17	Banfield	27	9	8	10	27	24	+3	35
18	San Martín (SJ)	27	9	6	12	30	36	−6	33

Source: AFA
Rules for classification: 1) points; 2) play-off (only if needed to decide championship); 3) goal difference; 4) goals scored; 5) head-to-head points; 6) head-to-head goal difference; 7) head-to-head goals scored.

=== Results by matchday ===
Matchday	1	2	3	4	5	6	7	8	9	10	11	12	13	14	15	16	17	18	19	20	21	22	23	24	25	26	27
Ground	H	H	A	H	A	H	A	H	A	H	A	H	A														
Result	W	L	D	L	W	D	L	W	L	W	W	L															
Position	8	13	15	20	12	17	18	15	18	14	10	13															

Updated to match(es) played on 12 December 2017. Source: Soccerway
A = Away; H = Home; W = Win; D = Draw; L = Loss

28 August 2017 1	Estudiantes (Argentina)	2–1	(Argentina) Arsenal de Sarandí	La Plata, Argentina
21:05	L. Melano 80'; C. Alemán 86'	Report	R. Contreras 39'	Stadium: Estadio Ciudad de La Plata; Referee: Silvio Trucco (Argentina)

9 September 2017 2	Estudiantes (Argentina)	0–1	(Argentina) Defensa y Justicia	La Plata, Argentina
16:05		Report	F. Márquez 83'	Stadium: Estadio Ciudad de La Plata; Referee: Fernando Espinoza (Argentina)

15 September 2017 3	Colón (Argentina)	0–0	(Argentina) Estudiantes	Santa Fe, Argentina
21:05		Report		Stadium: Estadio Brigadier General Estanislao López; Referee: Pedro Argañaraz (Argentina)

25 September 2017 4	Estudiantes (Argentina)	1–3	(Argentina) San Lorenzo	La Plata, Argentina
21:05	M. Pavone 50'	Report	F. Belluschi 12', 89'; N. Blandi 80'	Stadium: Estadio Ciudad de La Plata; Referee: Ariel Penel (Argentina)

30 September 2017 5	Temperley (Argentina)	0–3	(Argentina) Estudiantes	Turdera, Argentina
16:05		Report	J. Otero 2'; P. Lugüercio 4'; G. Fernández 17'	Stadium: Estadio Alfredo Beranger; Referee: Fernando Echenique (Argentina)

14 October 2017 6	Estudiantes (Argentina)	1–1	(Argentina) Banfield	La Plata, Argentina
16:15	P. Lugüercio 81'	Report	P. Mouche 38'	Stadium: Estadio Ciudad de La Plata; Referee: Andrés Merlos (Argentina)

28 October 2017 7	San Martín (Argentina)	1–0	(Argentina) Estudiantes	San Juan, Argentina
16:10	L. Ardente 17' (pen.)	Report		Stadium: Estadio Ingeniero Hilario Sánchez; Referee: Nicolás Lamolina (Argentina)

5 November 2017 8	Estudiantes (Argentina)	1–0	(Argentina) Argentinos Juniors	Quilmes, Argentina
14:05	J. Schunke 47'	Report		Stadium: Estadio Centenario Dr. José Luis Meiszner; Referee: Pablo Echavarría (Argentina)

19 November 2017 9	Tigre (Argentina)	2–0	(Argentina) Estudiantes	Buenos Aires, Argentina
17:00	M. Pérez García 27' (pen.); I. Gómez 65' (o.g.)	Report		Stadium: Estadio José Dellagiovanna; Referee: Andrés Merlos (Argentina)

26 November 2017 10	Estudiantes (Argentina)	1–0	(Argentina) Atlético Tucumán	Quilmes, Argentina
17:00	B. Cejas 88'	Report		Stadium: Estadio Centenario Dr. José Luis Meiszner; Referee: Silvio Trucco (Argentina)

3 December 2017 11	Talleres (Argentina)	0–1	(Argentina) Estudiantes	Córdoba, Argentina
17:30		Report	L. Melano 16'	Stadium: Estadio Mario Alberto Kempes; Referee: Diego Abal (Argentina)

10 December 2017 12	Estudiantes (Argentina)	0–1	(Argentina) Boca Juniors	Quilmes, Argentina
21:30		Report	W. Barrios 76'	Stadium: Estadio Centenario Dr. José Luis Meiszner; Referee: Fernando Espinoza (Argentina)

January 2018 13	Independiente (Argentina)	–	(Argentina) Estudiantes	Avellaneda, Argentina
		Report		Stadium: Estadio Libertadores de América

== Copa Argentina ==
Win Draw Loss

–

== Copa Sudamericana ==
Win Draw Loss

=== Second stage ===
13 July 2017 First leg	Nacional Potosí (Bolivia)	0–1	(Argentina) Estudiantes	Potosí, Bolivia
19:15		Report	L. Rodríguez 79'	Stadium: Estadio Víctor Agustín Ugarte; Referee: Wilmar Roldán (Colombia)

3 August 2017 Second leg	Estudiantes (Argentina)	2–0 (agg: 3–0)	(Bolivia) Nacional Potosí	La Plata, Argentina
19:15	M. Pavone 45+1' (pen.), 71'	Report		Stadium: Estadio Ciudad de La Plata; Referee: Leodán González (Uruguay)

=== Round of 16 ===
23 August 2017 First leg	Nacional Asunción (Paraguay)	1–0	(Argentina) Estudiantes	Asunción, Paraguay
21:45	L. Caballero 59'	Report		Stadium: Estadio Defensores del Chaco; Referee: Wilson Lamouroux (Colombia)

19 September 2017 Second leg	Estudiantes (Argentina)	0–1 (agg: 0–2)	(Paraguay) Nacional Asunción	La Plata, Argentina
19:15		Report	M. Jacquet 65'	Stadium: Estadio Ciudad de La Plata; Referee: Raphael Claus (Brazil)

== Copa Libertadores ==
Win Draw Loss

–
