= Matías Pellegrini =

Argentine footballer

Personal information
- Date of birth: 11 March 2000 (age 26)
- Place of birth: Magdalena, Argentina
- Height: 1.76 m (5 ft 9 1/2 in)
- Position: Left winger

Team information
- Current team: Velez Sarsfield
- Number: 11

Youth career
- CRIM de Magdalena
- Estudiantes

Senior career*
Years	Team	Apps	(Gls)
2018–2019	Estudiantes	15	(3)
2019–2022	Inter Miami	19	(1)
2019	→ Estudiantes (loan)	6	(1)
2021	→ Fort Lauderdale CF (loan)	0	(0)
2021–2022	→ Estudiantes (loan)	33	(3)
2022	→ New York City FC (loan)	4	(0)
2023	New York City FC	24	(1)
2024–	Vélez Sarsfield	61	(4)
- * Club domestic league appearances and goals as of 16:56, 16 June 2026 (UTC)

Matías Pellegrini (born 11 March 2000) is an Argentine professional footballer who plays as a left winger for Argentine Primera División club Velez Sarsfield.

== Club career ==
=== Estudiantes ===
Pellegrini began with Estudiantes, who signed him from CRIM de Magdalena. He was moved into the senior squad under manager Leandro Benítez during 2018–19, who selected him for his professional debut in a Copa Argentina tie with Central Córdoba on 24 July 2018. After featuring in the 2018 Copa Libertadores versus Grêmio, Pellegrini made his first appearance in the Primera División on 12 August during a defeat to Godoy Cruz. In his next match a week later, also in the league, he scored the first senior goal in a 2–0 victory over Boca Juniors. Overall, Pellegrini ended his first campaign with four goals in twenty-three fixtures.

=== Inter Miami ===
On 23 July 2019, Pellegrini agreed a transfer to Major League Soccer's Inter Miami, and he was immediately loaned back to Estudiantes until January 2020. The transfer fee was reported to be "between $6 million and $9 million."

On 16 April 2021, Inter Miami removed Pellegrini from their roster to meet MLS requirements. He was loaned to Fort Lauderdale CF, Inter Miami's USL League One affiliate.

On 2 August 2021, Inter Miami loaned Pellegrini to his former club Estudiantes until June 2022 with an option to buy. Estudiantes did not exercise their purchase option at the end of the loan, however, and Inter Miami subsequently waived Pellegrini so that he could join another MLS club on a free outside of the transfer window.

=== New York City FC ===
On 19 August 2022, MLS club New York City FC claimed Pellegrini off waivers. NYCFC announced on October 23, 2023, that the club declined Pellegrini's option, thus making him a free agent.

== International career ==
Pellegrini was called up to train with the Argentina U17s in November 2016. Two years later, in 2018, he was selected by the U20s.

== Career statistics ==
As of match played 15 December 2024

Appearances and goals by club, season and competition
Club	Season	League			National cup		League cup		Continental		Other		Total	
Club	Season	Division	Apps	Goals	Apps	Goals	Apps	Goals	Apps	Goals	Apps	Goals	Apps	Goals
Estudiantes	2018–19	Primera División	15	3	3	0	3	1	2 (Note: Appearance(s) in the Copa Libertadores)	0	—		23	4
Estudiantes	2019–20	Primera División	0	0	1	1	0	0	—		—		1	1
Estudiantes	Total		15	3	4	1	3	1	2	0	—		24	5
Inter Miami	2020	Major League Soccer	19	1	—		—		—		1	0	20	1
Estudiantes (loan)	2019–20	Primera División	6	1	—		—		—		—		6	1
Estudiantes (loan)	2021	Primera División	18	2	—		—		—		—		18	2
Estudiantes (loan)	2022	Primera División	15	1	—		—		9	1	—		24	2
Estudiantes (loan)	Total		33	3	—		—		9	1	—		42	4
New York City FC	2022	Major League Soccer	4	0	—		—		—		2	0	6	0
New York City FC	2023	Major League Soccer	24	1	0	0	—		—		3	0	27	1
New York City FC	Total		28	1	0	0	—		—		5	0	33	1
Vélez Sarsfield	2024	Primera División	26	1	5	0	—		—		1	0	32	1
Career total			127	10	9	1	3	1	11	1	7	0	157	13

== Honours ==
New York City FC

- Campeones Cup: 2022

Vélez Sarsfield

- Argentine Primera División: 2024
- Supercopa Internacional: 2024
