= Juan Perotti =

Argentine footballer (born 1992)

Personal information
- Date of birth: 12 January 1992 (age 34)
- Place of birth: carhue, Argentina
- Height: 1.73 m (5 ft 8 in)
- Position: Midfielder

Team information
- Current team: Olimpo

Senior career*
Years	Team	Apps	(Gls)
2014–2018	Estudiantes	1	(0)
2014–2015	→ Villa San Carlos (loan)	17	(1)
2016	→ Tiro Federal (BB) (loan)	17	(0)
2018	Racing de Carhué		
2019–2020	Liniers	15	(3)
2020–	Olimpo	50	(4)
- * Club domestic league appearances and goals as of 18:57, 7 August 2022 (UTC)

Juan Perotti (born 12 January 1992) is an Argentine professional footballer who plays as a midfielder for Olimpo.

== Career ==
Perotti began with Estudiantes of the Argentine Primera División. Prior to making his Estudiantes senior debut, Perotti spent four seasons out on loan to Villa San Carlos and Tiro Federal (BB) respectively. For Villa San Carlos, he scored once (versus Platense on 29 August 2014) in seventeen matches over two seasons in Primera B Metropolitana. For Tiro Federal, he played ten fixtures in Torneo Federal A as Tiro Federal were relegated to Torneo Federal B where he featured seven times. He returned to Estudiantes ahead of 2016–17 and eventually made his first-team debut on 23 April 2017 against Huracán.

In February 2018, Perotti terminated his contract with Estudiantes. He subsequently, via a trial with Chilean team Santiago Morning, joined regional Argentine club Racing de Carhué. In January 2019, Perotti signed with Liniers. He'd remain for two seasons, scoring three goals in fifteen appearances in the Torneo Regional Federal Amateur. He also featured for them at regional level in Liga del Sur, notably netting fifteen goals in 2019 as they were crowned champions. On 9 September 2020, Perotti completed a move to Torneo Federal A's Olimpo.

== Career statistics ==
As of 23 September 2020.

Club statistics
Club	Season	League			Cup		League Cup		Continental		Other		Total	
Club	Season	Division	Apps	Goals	Apps	Goals	Apps	Goals	Apps	Goals	Apps	Goals	Apps	Goals
Estudiantes	2014	Primera División	0	0	0	0	—		0	0	0	0	0	0
Estudiantes	2015	Primera División	0	0	0	0	—		0	0	0	0	0	0
Estudiantes	2016	Primera División	0	0	0	0	—		0	0	0	0	0	0
Estudiantes	2016–17	Primera División	1	0	0	0	—		0	0	0	0	1	0
Estudiantes	2017–18	Primera División	0	0	0	0	—		0	0	0	0	0	0
Estudiantes	Total		1	0	0	0	—		0	0	0	0	1	0
Villa San Carlos (loan)	2014	Primera B Metropolitana	15	1	0	0	—		—		0	0	15	1
Villa San Carlos (loan)	2015	Primera B Metropolitana	2	0	0	0	—		—		0	0	2	0
Villa San Carlos (loan)	Total		17	1	0	0	—		—		0	0	17	1
Tiro Federal (BB) (loan)	2016	Torneo Federal A	10	0	0	0	—		—		0	0	10	0
Tiro Federal (BB) (loan)	2016 (C)	Torneo Federal B	7	0	0	0	—		—		0	0	7	0
Tiro Federal (BB) (loan)	Total		17	0	0	0	—		—		0	0	17	0
Olimpo	2020–21	Torneo Federal A	0	0	0	0	—		—		0	0	0	0
Career total			35	1	0	0	—		0	0	0	0	35	1

== Honours ==
Liniers

- Liga del Sur: 2019
