= Marco Borgnino =

Argentine footballer (born 1997)

Personal information
- Date of birth: 25 October 1997 (age 29)
- Place of birth: Rafaela, Argentina
- Height: 1.76 m (5 ft 9 in)
- Position: Left winger

Team information
- Current team: Giugliano
- Number: 30

Youth career
- –2016: Atlético de Rafaela

Senior career*
Years	Team	Apps	(Gls)
2016–2023	Atlético de Rafaela	63	(12)
2017–2018	→ Estudiantes (loan)	8	(0)
2019–2020	→ Nacional (loan)	5	(1)
2020–2021	→ Unión Santa Fe (loan)	7	(0)
2023	Farul Constanța	8	(0)
2024	Cobreloa	20	(3)
2025	Alvarado	19	(0)
2026	Beroe Stara Zagora	11	(1)
2026–	Giugliano	1	(0)
- * Club domestic league appearances and goals as of 28 August 2026

Marco Borgnino (born 25 October 1997) is an Argentine professional footballer who plays as a left winger for Serie C Group C club Giugliano.

== Career ==
Borgnino started in the youth ranks of Argentine Primera División side Atlético de Rafaela, before making his first-team debut on 3 June 2016 in a Copa Argentina match against Ferro Carril Oeste. Borgnino made his league debut on 28 August against Atlético Tucumán, coming on as a second-half substitute in a 1–0 defeat. Two Primera División matches later, he scored his first professional goal in an away win versus Gimnasia y Esgrima. He scored three goals in sixteen league appearances for Rafaela as they were relegated to Primera B Nacional. In July 2017, Borgnino joined top-flight Estudiantes on loan.

He made his Estudiantes debut on 29 August versus Arsenal de Sarandí. Borgnino returned to Rafaela in June 2018, subsequently netting eight times across sixteen games in the 2018–19 Primera B Nacional. On 8 July 2019, Borgnino was loaned to Portuguese outfit Nacional of LigaPro. His first appearance came in a goalless draw against Mafra on 25 August, prior to the winger scoring his one and only goal for Nacional in a win over Penafiel on 21 September. Borgnino returned to Rafaela in June 2020 after five appearances in Portugal. In the succeeding August, Borgnino was loaned to Unión Santa Fe.

In June 2023, Borgnino signed for Romanian Liga I Champions Farul Constanța. For the 2024 season, he returned to South America and signed with Chilean Primera División club Cobreloa.

== Career statistics ==
As of 5 December 2023.

Club statistics
Club	Season	League			Cup		League Cup		Continental		Other		Total	
Club	Season	Division	Apps	Goals	Apps	Goals	Apps	Goals	Apps	Goals	Apps	Goals	Apps	Goals
Atlético de Rafaela	2016	Primera División	0	0	1	0	—		—		0	0	1	0
Atlético de Rafaela	2016–17	Primera División	16	3	1	0	—		—		0	0	17	3
Atlético de Rafaela	2018–19	Primera B Nacional	15	7	1	1	—		—		0	0	16	8
Atlético de Rafaela	2019–20	Primera B Nacional	0	0	0	0	—		—		0	0	0	0
Atlético de Rafaela	2022	Primera B Nacional	31	2	0	0	—		—		—		31	2
Atlético de Rafaela	2023	Primera B Nacional	1	0	0	0	—		—		—		1	0
Atlético de Rafaela	Total		63	12	3	1	—		—		0	0	66	13
Estudiantes (loan)	2017–18	Primera División	8	0	0	0	—		0	0	0	0	8	0
Nacional (loan)	2019–20	LigaPro	5	1	0	0	0	0	—		0	0	5	1
Unión Santa Fe (loan)	2021	Primera División	7	0	0	0	8	1	—		0	0	15	1
Farul Constanța	2023–24	Liga I	8	0	2	0	—		2	0	1	0	13	0
Cobreloa	2024	Chilean Primera División	0	0	0	0	—		—		—		0	0
Career total			91	13	5	1	8	1	2	0	1	0	107	15

== Honours ==
Farul Constanța

- Supercupa României runner-up: 2023
