= Nahuel Luna =

Argentine footballer

Personal information
- Full name: Luis Nahuel Luna
- Date of birth: 14 February 1996 (age 30)
- Place of birth: San Miguel de Tucumán, Argentina
- Height: 1.82 m (5 ft 11 1/2 in)
- Position: Forward

Team information
- Current team: Villa San Carlos (on loan from Estudiantes)

Youth career
- 2010–2016: Estudiantes

Senior career*
Years	Team	Apps	(Gls)
2016–	Estudiantes	1	(0)
2017	→ San Jorge (loan)	6	(0)
2018	→ Orsomarso (loan)	4	(0)
2019	→ Temperley (loan)	0	(0)
2019–	→ Villa San Carlos (loan)	2	(0)
- * Club domestic league appearances and goals as of 21:58, 24 March 2020 (UTC)

Luis Nahuel Luna (born 14 February 1996) is an Argentine professional footballer who plays as a forward for Villa San Carlos, on loan from Estudiantes.

== Career ==
Luna started his career with Estudiantes, who he signed for in 2010. He made his professional debut in a 2016 Argentine Primera División fixture with Huracán on 5 March. Torneo Federal A side San Jorge loaned Luna in June 2017. Six appearances followed for the club during 2017–18. On 10 February 2018, Luna joined Categoría Primera B side Orsomarso on loan. His first appearance arrived on 17 February against Universitario Popayán, which was one of four appearances for Orsomarso before he returned to Estudiantes in July. Luna was loaned to Temperley in January 2019.

== Career statistics ==
As of 1 February 2019.

Club statistics
Club	Season	League			Cup		Continental		Other		Total	
Club	Season	Division	Apps	Goals	Apps	Goals	Apps	Goals	Apps	Goals	Apps	Goals
Estudiantes	2016	Primera División	1	0	0	0	—		0	0	1	0
Estudiantes	2016–17	Primera División	0	0	0	0	0	0	0	0	0	0
Estudiantes	2017–18	Primera División	0	0	0	0	0	0	0	0	0	0
Estudiantes	2018–19	Primera División	0	0	0	0	0	0	0	0	0	0
Estudiantes	Total		1	0	0	0	0	0	0	0	1	0
San Jorge (loan)	2017–18	Torneo Federal A	6	0	0	0	—		0	0	6	0
Orsomarso (loan)	2018	Primera B	4	0	—		—		0	0	4	0
Temperley (loan)	2018–19	Primera B Nacional	0	0	—		—		0	0	0	0
Career total			11	0	0	0	0	0	0	0	11	0
