= Emiliano Ozuna =

Argentine footballer

Personal information
- Full name: Emiliano Ariel Ozuna
- Date of birth: 9 February 1996 (age 30)
- Place of birth: Magdalena, Argentina
- Height: 1.72 m (5 ft 7 1/2 in)
- Position: Left midfielder

Team information
- Current team: Ferro Carril Oeste

Youth career
- 2009–2015: Estudiantes

Senior career*
Years	Team	Apps	(Gls)
2015–2019	Estudiantes	3	(0)
2017–2018	→ Temperley (loan)	34	(2)
2018–2019	→ Aldosivi (loan)	10	(1)
2019–2021	Celaya	42	(2)
2021–2023	Sol de América	40	(3)
2023–2026	Deportivo Maipú	68	(2)
2026–	Ferro Carril Oeste	7	(0)
- * Club domestic league appearances and goals as of 17:39, 11 April 2026 (UTC)

Emiliano Ariel Ozuna (born 9 February 1996) is an Argentine professional footballer who plays as a left midfielder for Ferro Carril Oeste.

== Career ==
Ozuna joined the Estudiantes youth ranks in 2009. Six years later, he made his professional debut for the club on 20 July 2015 in a victory away to Crucero del Norte. Two more appearances came Ozuna's way during 2015. After failing to feature for Estudiantes between 2016 and 2017, Ozuna departed in February 2017 to join fellow Primera División side Temperley on loan. His first league appearance for Temperley arrived on 12 March against Tigre, while his first goal came on 30 June versus Sportivo Las Parejas in the Copa Argentina. He returned to Estudiantes in July 2018, which preceded an immediate loan to Aldosivi.

On 27 June 2019, having mutually ended his contract with Estudiantes, Ozuna moved abroad to Ascenso MX outfit Celaya.

== Career statistics ==
As of 28 June 2019.

Club statistics
Club	Season	League			Cup		League Cup		Continental		Other		Total	
Club	Season	Division	Apps	Goals	Apps	Goals	Apps	Goals	Apps	Goals	Apps	Goals	Apps	Goals
Estudiantes	2015	Primera División	3	0	0	0	—		0	0	0	0	3	0
Estudiantes	2016	Primera División	0	0	0	0	—		0	0	0	0	0	0
Estudiantes	2016–17	Primera División	0	0	0	0	—		0	0	0	0	0	0
Estudiantes	2017–18	Primera División	0	0	0	0	—		0	0	0	0	0	0
Estudiantes	2018–19	Primera División	0	0	0	0	—		0	0	0	0	0	0
Estudiantes	Total		3	0	0	0	—		0	0	0	0	3	0
Temperley (loan)	2016–17	Primera División	15	0	1	1	—		—		0	0	16	1
Temperley (loan)	2017–18	Primera División	19	2	1	0	—		—		0	0	20	2
Temperley (loan)	Total		34	2	2	1	—		—		0	0	36	3
Aldosivi (loan)	2018–19	Primera División	10	1	1	0	—		—		0	0	11	1
Celaya	2019–20	Ascenso MX	15	0	4	0	—		—		0	0	19	0
Career total			62	3	7	1	—		0	0	0	0	69	4
