= Nicolás Talpone =

Argentine footballer

Personal information
- Full name: Nicolás Talpone
- Date of birth: 9 April 1996 (age 30)
- Place of birth: La Plata, Argentina
- Height: 1.65 m (5 ft 5 in)
- Position: Midfielder

Team information
- Current team: Estudiantes RC (on loan from Colón)
- Number: 19

Youth career
- Círculo Tolosano
- ADAFI
- –2016: Estudiantes

Senior career*
Years	Team	Apps	(Gls)
2016–2019	Estudiantes	8	(0)
2018–2019	→ Agropecuario (loan)	15	(1)
2019–2021	Atlanta	21	(0)
2021–2024	Estudiantes RC	98	(7)
2024–	Colón	67	(4)
2026–	→ Estudiantes RC	21	(0)
- * Club domestic league appearances and goals as of 17:45, 8 November 2026 (UTC)

Nicolás Talpone (born 9 April 1996) is an Argentine professional footballer who plays as a midfielder for Estudiantes RC, on loan from Colón.

== Career ==
Talpone spent his youth career with Círculo Tolosano, ADAFI and Estudiantes. He made his senior professional debut for Argentine Primera División side Estudiantes on 11 April 2016, he was subbed on for Augusto Solari with seven minutes to play in a 3–2 victory over Atlético Tucumán. His first start for the club arrived on 7 April 2017 during a 1–4 win away to Aldosivi, which was one of three appearances in 2016–17. Talpone was loaned out in July 2018 to Agropecuario in Primera B Nacional.

In May 2019, Estudiantes informed him that it would not renew his contract and he was free to act.

In June 2019 he arrived in Atlanta, where he played until 2021. From 2021 to 2024 he was a member of the Estudiantes de Rio Cuarto team.

In January 2024 he signs a 3-year contract with Colón of Argentina's Primera Nacional.

== Career statistics ==
As of 6 September 2018.

Club statistics
Club	Season	League			Cup (Note: Includes the Copa Argentina)		League Cup		Continental (Note: Includes the Copa Libertadores and Copa Sudamericana)		Other		Total	
Club	Season	Division	Apps	Goals	Apps	Goals	Apps	Goals	Apps	Goals	Apps	Goals	Apps	Goals
Estudiantes	2016	Primera División	1	0	0	0	—		0	0	0	0	1	0
Estudiantes	2016–17	Primera División	3	0	0	0	—		0	0	0	0	3	0
Estudiantes	2017–18	Primera División	4	0	0	0	—		0	0	0	0	4	0
Estudiantes	2018–19	Primera División	0	0	0	0	—		0	0	0	0	0	0
Estudiantes	Total		8	0	0	0	—		0	0	0	0	8	0
Agropecuario (loan)	2018–19	Primera B Nacional	2	0	1	0	—		0	0	0	0	3	0
Career total			10	0	1	0	—		0	0	0	0	11	0
