= Carlo Lattanzio =

Argentine footballer

Personal information
- Full name: Carlo María Lattanzio
- Date of birth: 25 July 1997 (age 29)
- Place of birth: La Plata, Argentina
- Height: 1.78 m (5 ft 10 in)
- Position: Forward

Team information
- Current team: San Martín SJ

Youth career
- Estudiantes

Senior career*
Years	Team	Apps	(Gls)
2015–2024	Estudiantes	30	(0)
2019–2020	→ Estudiantes BA (loan)	13	(1)
2021	→ Central Córdoba SdE (loan)	26	(2)
2022	→ Platense (loan)	4	(0)
2023	→ Quilmes (loan)	24	(1)
2024–2025	Atlanta	24	(0)
2025–2026	Almagro	23	(0)
2026–	San Martín SJ	4	(0)
- * Club domestic league appearances and goals as of 19:07, 19 March 2026 (UTC)

Carlo María Lattanzio (born 25 July 1997, in La Plata, Argentina) is an Argentine professional footballer who plays for San Martín SJ.

== Career statistics ==
As of 16 May 2025

Club	Division	League			Cup		Continental		Total	
Club	Division	Season	Apps	Goals	Apps	Goals	Apps	Goals	Apps	Goals
Estudiantes	Primera División	2015	1	0	0	0	0	0	1	0
Estudiantes	Primera División	2017-18	11	0	0	0	7	0	18	0
Estudiantes	Primera División	2018-19	5	0	0	0	0	0	5	0
Estudiantes	Primera División	2022	10	0	1	1	3	0	14	1
Estudiantes	Total		27	0	1	1	10	0	38	1
Estudiantes BA	Primera B Nacional	2019-20	17	1	4	0	0	0	21	1
Central Córdoba SdE	Primera División	2021	18	0	8	2	0	0	26	2
Platense	Primera División	2022	4	0	0	0	0	0	4	0
Quilmes	Primera B Nacional	2023	24	1	0	0	0	0	24	1
Atlanta	Primera B Nacional	2024	24	0	0	0	0	0	24	0
Almagro	Primera B Nacional	2025	9	0	0	0	0	0	9	0
Career total			123	2	13	3	10	0	146	5
