= Diego García (footballer, born 29 December 1996) =

Uruguayan professional footballer

Personal information
- Full name: Diego Gonzalo García Cardozo
- Date of birth: 29 December 1996 (age 29)
- Place of birth: Salto, Uruguay
- Height: 1.68 m (5 ft 6 in)
- Position: Attacking midfielder

Team information
- Current team: Peñarol
- Number: 50

Youth career
- Sol De América
- 2010–2012: Ceibal (Salto)
- 2012–2014: Salto Nuevo FC
- 2014–2015: Liverpool Montevideo
- 2015: Juventud

Senior career*
Years	Team	Apps	(Gls)
2015–2019	Juventud	52	(8)
2017	→ Tacuarembó (loan)	14	(4)
2019	Boston River	0	(0)
2019	→ Juventud (loan)	15	(2)
2019–2023	Estudiantes	26	(2)
2021	→ Talleres (loan)	18	(1)
2022	→ Patronato (loan)	15	(1)
2022–2023	→ Emelec (loan)	39	(2)
2024	Liverpool Montevideo	37	(5)
2025–	Peñarol	29	(3)
- * Club domestic league appearances and goals as of 1 October 2025

Diego Gonzalo García Cardozo (born 29 December 1996) is a Uruguayan professional footballer who plays as an attacking midfielder for Peñarol.

== Career ==
García's career began in his homeland with Juventud. He made the breakthrough into senior football in 2015–16, initially as an unused substitute for a Primera División draw away to Sud América on 21 November 2015. His professional debut arrived in the succeeding February, appearing for seventy-one minutes of a win on the road against Liverpool. A total of twenty-seven appearances came for García in three seasons, prior to his departure on loan midway through 2017 to Tacuarembó. Goals against Villa Teresa, Oriental, Cerrito and Central Español occurred in the Segunda División. He went back to Juventud at the end of the year.

Juventud were relegated while García was at Tacuarembó, with the attacking midfielder subsequently netting eight times for Juventud in the second tier as they won promotion back to the Primera División for 2019. Ahead of the aforementioned campaign, in February 2019, García was signed by top-flight club Boston River; though immediately returned to Juventud on loan. Two goals in fifteen games followed in four months. On 15 July 2019, García completed a transfer to Argentine Primera División side Estudiantes. He made his bow in the Copa Argentina on 20 July versus Mitre.

== Personal life ==
In September 2018, García and Juventud publicly apologised to left-back Roger Bastos after the Brazilian was racially abused; after García allegedly called Bastos "a monkey" and offered him a banana, though he claimed his intentions were not racist.

== Career statistics ==
As of 23 July 2019.

Appearances and goals by club, season and competition
Club	Season	League			Cup		League Cup		Continental		Other		Total	
Club	Season	Division	Apps	Goals	Apps	Goals	Apps	Goals	Apps	Goals	Apps	Goals	Apps	Goals
Juventud	2015–16	Uruguayan Primera División	9	0	—		—		0	0	0	0	9	0
Juventud	2016	Uruguayan Primera División	8	0	—		—		—		0	0	8	0
Juventud	2017	Uruguayan Primera División	10	0	—		—		—		0	0	10	0
Juventud	2018	Segunda División	25	8	—		—		—		0	0	25	8
Juventud	Total		52	8	—		—		0	0	0	0	52	8
Tacuarembó (loan)	2017	Segunda División	14	4	—		—		—		0	0	14	4
Boston River	2019	Uruguayan Primera División	0	0	—		—		—		0	0	0	0
Juventud (loan)	2019	Uruguayan Primera División	15	2	—		—		—		0	0	15	2
Estudiantes	2019–20	Argentine Primera División	0	0	1	0	0	0	—		0	0	1	0
Career total			81	14	1	0	0	0	0	0	0	0	82	14
