= Enzo Kalinski =

Argentine footballer

Personal information
- Full name: Enzo Maximiliano Kalinski Martínez
- Date of birth: 10 March 1987 (age 39)
- Place of birth: Santiago del Estero, Argentina
- Height: 1.83 m (6 ft 0 in)
- Position: Midfielder

Team information
- Current team: Fundación Amigos

Youth career
- Atlético Güemes
- Central Córdoba SdE
- Quilmes

Senior career*
Years	Team	Apps	(Gls)
2007–2011	Quilmes	65	(3)
2011–2016	San Lorenzo	125	(4)
2016–2017	Universidad Católica	24	(4)
2017	Tijuana	5	(0)
2018	Banfield	24	(3)
2019–2021	Estudiantes	28	(1)
2021–2022	Argentinos Juniors	12	(0)
2022–2024	Central Córdoba SdE	55	(1)
2024–2026	Quilmes	29	(1)
2026–	Fundación Amigos	0	(0)
- * Club domestic league appearances and goals as of 19:31, 12 March 2026 (UTC)

Enzo Maximiliano Kalinski Martínez (born 10 March 1987) is an Argentine professional footballer who plays for Torneo Federal A club Fundación Amigos.

== Personal life ==
Born in Argentina, Kalinski is of Polish descent.

== Honours ==
San Lorenzo

- Argentine Primera División: 2013 Inicial
- Copa Libertadores: 2014
- Supercopa Argentina: 2015

Universidad Catolica

- Chilean Primera División: Apertura 2016-17
- Supercopa de Chile: 2016
