= Ángel González (footballer, born May 1994) =

Argentinian association football player

Personal information
- Date of birth: 16 May 1994 (age 32)
- Place of birth: Godoy Cruz, Argentina
- Height: 1.69 m (5 ft 7 in)
- Position: Right winger

Team information
- Current team: Ferro Carril Oeste

Youth career
- 2011–2014: Godoy Cruz

Senior career*
Years	Team	Apps	(Gls)
2014–2019	Godoy Cruz	94	(11)
2019–2022	Estudiantes	42	(3)
2021–2022	→ Lanús (loan)	38	(5)
2022–2025	LDU Quito	6	(0)
2023–2024	→ Peñarol (loan)	21	(0)
2025–2026	Almagro	30	(2)
2026–	Ferro Carril Oeste	6	(0)
- * Club domestic league appearances and goals as of 17:43, 11 April 2026 (UTC)

Ángel González (born 16 May 1994) is an Argentine professional footballer who plays as a right winger for Ferro Carril Oeste.

== Career ==
González joined Godoy Cruz in 2011. He was promoted into the club's first-team in 2014, appearing on the substitutes bench twice during the 2014 Primera División season for matches versus Estudiantes and Olimpo. In April 2015, González made his professional debut during a 2–2 draw with Vélez Sarsfield. Eleven more appearances followed in 2015. He scored his first Godoy Cruz goal on 21 February 2016 in a 4–1 home victory against Colón. On 27 June 2019, Estudiantes announced a deal had been agreed for González; pending contract terms and a medical.

On 14 July 2021, González joined Lanús on a 12-months loan deal with a purchase option. In July 2022, González was sent out on a new loan deal, this time to Ecuadorian club LDU Quito for one year, also with a purchase option.

== Career statistics ==
As of 7 June 2019.

Club statistics
Club	Season	League			Cup		League Cup		Continental		Other		Total	
Club	Season	Division	Apps	Goals	Apps	Goals	Apps	Goals	Apps	Goals	Apps	Goals	Apps	Goals
Godoy Cruz	2014	Primera División	0	0	0	0	—		0	0	0	0	0	0
Godoy Cruz	2015	Primera División	12	0	0	0	—		—		0	0	12	0
Godoy Cruz	2016	Primera División	11	1	0	0	—		—		1 (Note: Appearance(s) in the Primera División play-offs)	0	12	
Godoy Cruz	2016–17	Primera División	26	1	3	1	—		5 (Note: Appearance(s) in the Copa Libertadores)	3	0	0	34	5
Godoy Cruz	2017–18	Primera División	25	4	3	0	—		2	0	0	0	27	4
Godoy Cruz	2018–19	Primera División	20	5	2	0	3	0	5	1	0	0	30	6
Career total			94	11	8	1	3	0	12	4	1	0	118	16
