= Mauricio Rosales =

Argentine footballer (born 1992)

Personal information
- Full name: Pablo Mauricio Rosales
- Date of birth: 10 March 1992 (age 34)
- Place of birth: La Plata, Argentina
- Height: 1.83 m (6 ft 0 in)
- Position: Right-back

Team information
- Current team: Central Norte

Youth career
- Estudiantes

Senior career*
Years	Team	Apps	(Gls)
2012–2020	Estudiantes	46	(0)
2016–2017	→ Atlético Tucumán (loan)	8	(0)
2017–2018	→ Olimpo (loan)	5	(0)
2020–2022	Agropecuario	26	(1)
2022–2023	Temperley	30	(0)
2023–2024	Brown Adrogué	33	(1)
2024–2025	Atlanta	32	(0)
2025–2026	Chaco For Ever	20	(0)
2026–	Central Norte	8	(0)
- * Club domestic league appearances and goals as of 17:14, 24 April 2026 (UTC)

Pablo Mauricio Rosales (born 10 March 1992) is an Argentine professional footballer who plays as a midfielder for Central Norte.

== Career ==
Rosales' career began with Estudiantes of the Argentine Primera División. In 2012, Rosales was on the bench three times during the 2012–13 season prior to making his first-team debut on 24 July 2013 in a Copa Argentina match against Quilmes. He made his professional league debut on 4 November in an away win versus River Plate. He went onto make forty appearances in his first four seasons with Estudiantes. In August 2016, Rosales joined fellow Primera División side Atlético Tucumán on loan. His Atlético Tucumán debut came against Atlético de Rafaela on 28 August.

In August 2017, Rosales completed a loan move to Olimpo. He made his debut in the Copa Argentina against Racing Club on 1 September. A total of five further appearances followed, before he returned to Estudiantes on 16 May 2018. He appeared eight times across the next two seasons, before departing in August 2020 to Primera B Nacional's Agropecuario.

On 20 December 2021, Rosales joined Temperley on a deal until the end of 2022.

== Career statistics ==
As of 24 October 2020.

Club statistics
Club	Season	League			Cup		League Cup		Continental		Other		Total	
Club	Season	Division	Apps	Goals	Apps	Goals	Apps	Goals	Apps	Goals	Apps	Goals	Apps	Goals
Estudiantes	2012–13	Primera División	0	0	0	0	—		—		0	0	0	0
Estudiantes	2013–14	Primera División	14	0	1	0	—		—		0	0	15	0
Estudiantes	2014	Primera División	10	0	0	0	—		5 (Note: Appearance(s) in the Copa Sudamericana)	0	0	0	15	0
Estudiantes	2015	Primera División	15	0	1	0	—		4 (Note: Appearance(s) in the Copa Libertadores)	0	0	0	20	0
Estudiantes	2016	Primera División	1	0	0	0	—		—		0	0	1	0
Estudiantes	2016–17	Primera División	0	0	0	0	—		0	0	0	0	0	0
Estudiantes	2017–18	Primera División	0	0	0	0	—		0	0	0	0	0	0
Estudiantes	2018–19	Primera División	3	0	0	0	1	0	—		0	0	4	0
Estudiantes	2019–20	Primera División	3	0	1	0	0	0	—		0	0	4	0
Estudiantes	Total		46	0	3	0	1	0	9	0	0	0	59	0
Atlético Tucumán (loan)	2016–17	Primera División	8	0	0	0	—		3	0	0	0	11	0
Olimpo (loan)	2017–18	Primera División	5	0	1	0	—		—		0	0	6	0
Agropecuario	2020–21	Primera B Nacional	0	0	0	0	—		—		0	0	0	0
Career total			59	0	4	0	1	0	12	0	0	0	76	0
