= Franco Sivetti =

Argentine footballer

Personal information
- Full name: Franco Nicolás Sivetti
- Date of birth: 30 May 1998 (age 28)
- Place of birth: General Madariaga, Argentina
- Height: 1.79 m (5 ft 10 1/2 in)
- Position: Midfielder

Team information
- Current team: Gimnasia y Tiro

Youth career
- Club América de General Pirán
- Estudiantes de La Plata

Senior career*
Years	Team	Apps	(Gls)
2018–2022	Estudiantes de La Plata	9	(0)
2021	→ Guillermo Brown (loan)	31	(1)
2022–2024	Almagro	38	(0)
2024–2025	Defensores Unidos	24	(0)
2025–	Gimnasia y Tiro	32	(0)
- * Club domestic league appearances and goals as of 18:08, 28 April 2026 (UTC)

Franco Nicolás Sivetti (born 30 May 1998) is an Argentine professional footballer who plays as a midfielder for Gimnasia y Tiro.

== Career ==
Sivetti's senior career began with Argentine Primera División side Estudiantes in 2018, he joined them from Club América de General Piran years prior. He was selected in their senior squad for the 2018–19 season by manager Leandro Benítez, with the midfielder's first inclusion occurring during a Copa Argentina match with San Lorenzo on 3 October; he was an unused substitute as Estudiantes lost 1–3. Sivetti made his professional debut days later in a league defeat to Tigre, he was substituted off for Mariano Pavone on sixty-four minutes. In February 2021, Sivetti was loaned out to Guillermo Brown until the end of the year.

On 8 December 2021 Club Almagro confirmed, that Sivetti had signed a deal with the club until the end of 2023.

== Career statistics ==
As of 1 November 2018.

Club statistics
Club	Season	League			Cup (Note: Includes the Copa Argentina)		League Cup		Continental (Note: Includes the Copa Libertadores)		Other		Total	
Club	Season	Division	Apps	Goals	Apps	Goals	Apps	Goals	Apps	Goals	Apps	Goals	Apps	Goals
Estudiantes	2018–19	Primera División	3	0	0	0	—		0	0	0	0	3	0
Career total			3	0	0	0	—		0	0	0	0	3	0
