= Facundo Sánchez =

Argentine footballer

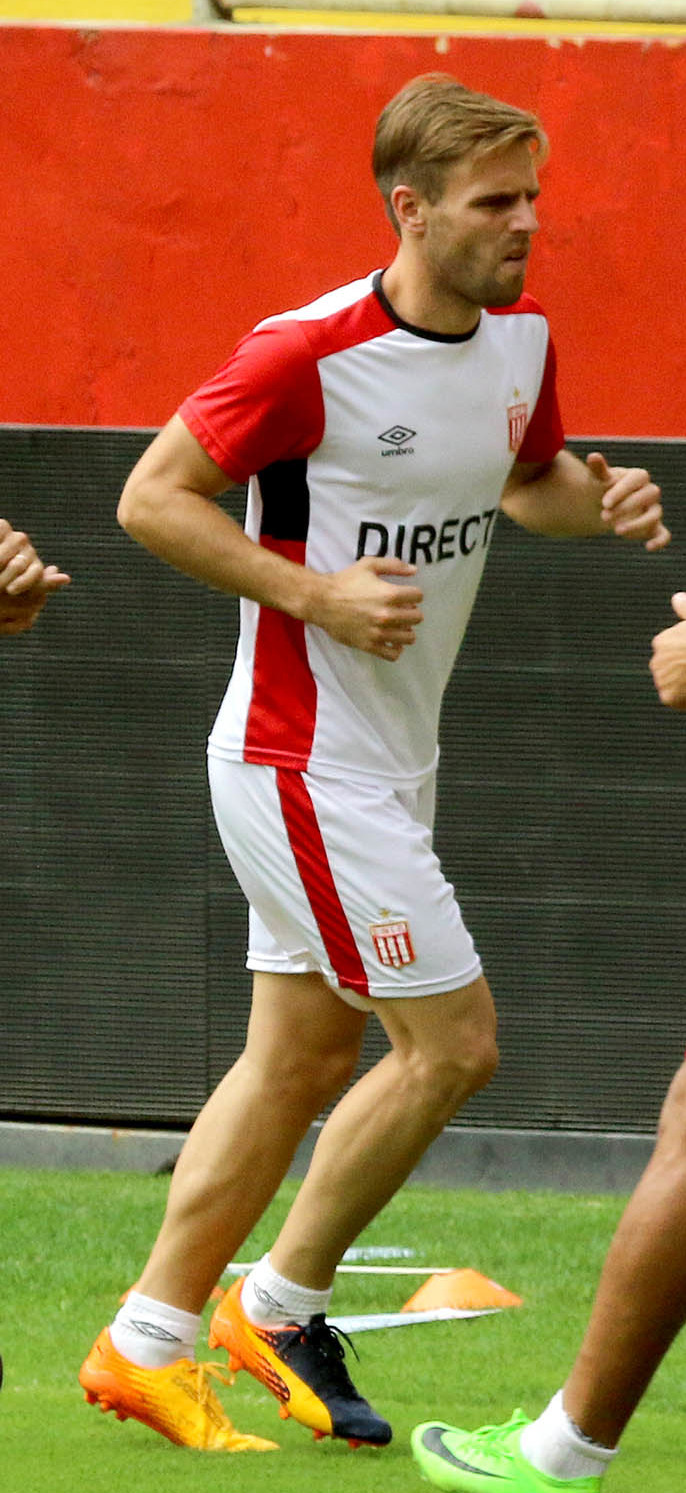

Personal information
- Date of birth: March 7, 1990 (age 36)
- Place of birth: Sa Pereira, Argentina
- Height: 1.75 m (5 ft 9 in)
- Position: Right back

Team information
- Current team: Colón
- Number: 4

Senior career*
Years	Team	Apps	(Gls)
2009–2011	Colón	4	(0)
2011–2013	Defensa y Justicia	47	(2)
2013–2016	Tigre	57	(6)
2016–2020	Estudiantes	109	(6)
2020–2023	Panathinaikos	56	(2)
2023–2024	AEK Larnaca	23	(1)
2025–	Colón	13	(0)
- * Club domestic league appearances and goals as of 17:35, 14 June 2025 (UTC)

Facundo Sánchez (born 7 March 1990) is an Argentine professional footballer who plays as a right back for Colón.

== Honours ==
Panathinaikos

- Greek Cup: 2021–22
