= Jonathan Schunke =

Argentine footballer

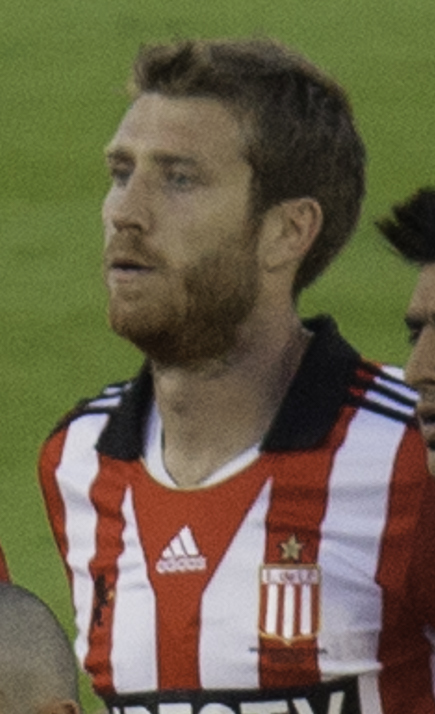

Personal information
- Full name: Jonathan Cristian Schunke
- Date of birth: 22 February 1990 (age 36)
- Place of birth: Misiones, Argentina
- Height: 1.94 m (6 ft 4 in)
- Position: Centre-back

Youth career
- 2004–2005: Jorge Gibson Brown

Senior career*
Years	Team	Apps	(Gls)
2005–2007	Guaraní Antonio Franco	49	(7)
2007	Real Arroyo Seco	14	(1)
2008	Almagro	18	(1)
2008	Godoy Cruz	0	(0)
2009	Almagro	19	(1)
2009–2010	Ferro Carril Oeste	36	(2)
2010–2011	Almirante Brown	37	(2)
2011–2012	Ferro Carril Oeste	38	(1)
2012–2021	Estudiantes	204	(11)
2020–2021	→ Aldosivi (loan)	22	(1)
2021	Sportivo Luqueño	8	(0)
- * Club domestic league appearances and goals as of 20:54, 1 April 2022 (UTC)

Jonathan Cristian Schunke (born 22 February 1987) is an Argentine footballer who plays as a centre-back.
